= The Hellacopters discography =

Discography of The Hellacopters between the years 1994 and 2008

- Studio albums: 9
- Extended plays: 6
- Singles: 31
- Split albums: 2
- Split singles: 12

This is the discography of The Hellacopters, a Swedish rock band active between 1994 and 2008. The band was formed by Nicke Andersson (vocals and guitar), Dregen (guitar), Robban Eriksson (drums) and Kenny Håkansson (bass guitar). The band released their Swedish Grammis-winning debut album in 1996. Soon the band recruited The Diamond Dogs guitarist Anders Lindström to play keyboard shortly before being the opening act to Kiss With the success of the band's second album Andersson was able to leave his other band Entombed to focus full-time on The Hellacopters. During the tour in support of the album, guitarist Dregen chose to leave the band to focus his time on his other band The Backyard Babies; to fulfill their touring responsibilities the band recruited Danne Andersson and Mattias Hellberg to fill in during the remaining dates of the tour. With Hellberg and Lindström taking the place of Dregen during the recording of the band's third album, the band changed their sound from their dirtier garage rock and garage punk sound to a more classic 1970s rock sound. The band then hired Robert Dahlqvist as a full-time guitarist, solidifying the band's lineup until its breakup. With Dahlqvist on board the band released three more studio albums and a cover album, with many EPs and limited edition releases as well. The Hellacopters disbanded amicably in 2008 so the members could move on to other projects.

== Studio albums ==
Year	Album details	Peak chart positions			Certifications (sales thresholds)
Year	Album details	SWE	FIN	NOR	Certifications (sales thresholds)
1996	Supershitty to the Max!: Released: 1 June 1996; Label: Man's Ruin White Jazz Toy's Factory; Format: CD, LP	39	—	—	
1997	Payin' the Dues: Released: 1 October 1997; Label: White Jazz Toy's Factory Sub Pop; Format: CD, LP	19	29	—	
1999	Grande Rock: Released: 17 May 1999; Label: White Jazz Toy's Factory Sub Pop; Format: CD, LP	10	30	—	
2000	High Visibility: Released: 16 October 2000; Label: Polar Universal; Format: CD, LP	5	35	—	SWE: 1 x Gold
2002	By the Grace of God: Released: 18 September 2002; Label: Universal Liquor and Poker; Format: CD, LP	2	8	13	SWE: Gold
2005	Rock & Roll Is Dead: Released: 6 June 2005; Label: Universal Wild Kingdom Liquor and Poker; Format: CD(+DVD), LP	3	20	25	
2008	Head Off: Released: 18 April 2008; Label: Wild Kingdom Toy's Factory Sound Pollution; Format: CD, LP	4	13	12	
2022	Eyes of Oblivion: Released: 1 April 2022; Label: Nuclear Blast; Format: CD, LP	1	4	28	
2025	Overdriver: Released: 31 January 2025; Label: Nuclear Blast; Format: CD, LP	1	7	—	

== Compilation albums ==
Year	Album details	Peak chart positions	
Year	Album details	SWE	FIN
2002	Cream of the Crap! Vol. 1: Released: 23 January 2002; Label: Universal Polar; Format: CD	31	28
2004	Cream of the Crap! Vol. 2: Released: 25 February 2004; Label: White Jazz Toy's Factory; Format: CD	31	—
2006	Air Raid Serenades: Released: 21 August 2006; Label: Universal Wild Kingdom; Format: CD, LP	13	39
2026	Cream of the Crap! Collected Non-Album Works Vol. 3: Released: 13 February 2026; Label: Warner Music Nuclear Blast; Format: CD, 2×LP	5	5

== Split albums ==
Year	Album details	Peak chart positions
Year	Album details	SWE
1997	Respect the Rock: Released: August 1, 1997; Label: White Jazz; Format: 10", Mini-CD	49
2001	White Trash Soul: Released: 15 January 2001; Label: Bad Afro Records; Format: 10", CD	—

== Split singles ==
Year	Title	Notes
1997	Electric Frankenstein vs The Hellacopters: Released: August 13, 1997; Label: Frank Records; Format: 7"	A split along with Electric Frankenstein, The Hellacopters recorded two songs, one of which was the April Stevens song "I Want a Lip".
1998	Rock & Roll Jihad: Released: 1998; Label: Rocketdog Records; Format: 7"	Recorded along with Dutch punk band The Nitwitz, with whom Nicke later formed The Hydromatics.
1999	New Bomb Turks / The Hellacopters: Released: February, 1999; Label: Anyway Records; Format: 7"	Besides recording Lowered Pentangles (Anything at All), Nicke and Dregen also recorded guitars with the New Bomb Turks.
1999	The Hellacopters / Powder Monkeys: Released: 1999; Label: Safety Pin Records; Format: 7"	A two-song single of The Dictators covers recorded with the Powder Monkeys.
1999	Check This Action: Released: 1999; Label: Butchers Hook; Format: 7"	Another Powder Monkeys split, The Hellacopters recorded the Love cover "A House is not a Motel".
1999	Blå Tåget / The Hellacopters: Released: July, 1999; Label: Format: 7"	Recorded along with the Swedish progg band Blå Tåget for the Swedish festival "Gränslösafestivalen" against racism.
1999	Gearhead Magazine #10: Released: September, 1999; Label: —; Format: 7"	A split with Rocket from the Crypt, distributed with car/punk rock magazine Gearhead Magazine, also features guest appearances by Euroboy and Anders Moller.
1999	Quadracopters / Hellajets: Released: October, 1999; Label: Estrus Records; Format: 7"	A two-song single recorded with mixed line ups of The Hellacopters and The Quadrajets.
2001	The Hellacopters / Adam West: Released: March 2001; Label: Fandango Records; Format: 7"	First split with Adam West, contains two Damned covers.
2003	Pack of Lies: Released: 2003; Label: Wild Kingdom; Format: 7"	Recorded with Swedish rock band The Nomads.
2004	The Hellacopters / Adam West: Released: 15 March 2004; Label: People Like You Records; Format: 7"	The second split with Adam West, the split contained four songs, two of which were cover of one of the other bands songs.
2005	The Hellacopters / The Doits: Released: September 2005; Label: Wild Kingdom; Format: 7"	Released as limited tour edition along with The Doits, The Hellacopters recorded the Alice Cooper cover I'm Eighteen.

== Extended plays ==
Year	Title
1998	Disappointment Blues: Released: 1998; Label: White Jazz Toy's Factory Au-Go-Go; Format: 10", Mini-CD
1999	Doggone Your Bad-Luck Soul: Released: March 3, 1999; Label: Man's Ruin; Format: 10"
1999	Move Right Out Of Here: Released: October 4, 1999; Label: White Jazz; Format: 7"
2001	Geekstreak: Released: 7 November 2001; Label: Universal; Format: Mini-CD
2004	Strikes Like Lightning: Released: 30 November 2004; Label: Universal, Sweet Nothing; Format: CD, 7" singles box-set
2007	Same Lame Story: Released: 26 June 2007; Label: Bootleg Booze Records; Format: 7"
2016	My Mephistophelean Creed: Released: 3 June 2016; Label: Psychout; Format: 12"

== Singles ==
List of singles, with selected chart positions
Year	Title	Peak chart positions	
Year	Title	SWE	FIN
1995	"Killing Alan"	—	—
1995	"1995"	—	—
1996	"Now"	—	—
1996	"(Gotta Get Some Action) Now!"	—	—
1996	"Misantropic High"	—	—
1997	"What Are You"	—	—
1997	"Riot on the Rocks"	—	—
1997	"What Are You"	—	—
1997	"Soul Seller"	36	—
1998	"City Slang"	—	—
1998	"Like No Other Man"	—	—
1998	"Looking at Me"	—	—
1998	"Hey"	53	—
1999	"Dirty Women"	—	—
1999	"Twist Action in New York"	—	—
1999	"Down Right Blue"	—	—
1999	"The Devil Stole the Beat from the Lord"	50	—
1999	"Twist Action Over America"	—	—
1999	"Move Right Out of Here"	49	—
1999	"Scott Morgan and the Hellacopters"	—	—
2000	"Twist Action in 2000"	—	—
2000	"It's Not a Long Way Down"	—	—
2000	"Toys and Flavours"	36	—
2000	"Hopeless Case of a Kid in Denial"	—	—
2001	"No Song Unheard"	40	—
2002	"By the Grace of God"	13	—
2002	"Carry Me Home"	—	—
2005	"Everything's on T.V."	33	—
2005	"I'm in the Band"	32	—
2007	"The Same Lame Story"	16	4
2008	"In the Sign of the Octopus"	57	—
2008	"Darling Darling"	42	—
2023	"En valsmelodi" (with Thåström)	51	—
2025	"Melody" / "My Obsession" (with Spiders)	53	—
"—" denotes releases that did not chart or were not released in that country.

== Music videos ==
- "(Gotta Get Some Action) Now!" (1996)
- "Soulseller" (1997)
- "The Devil Stole the Beat from the Lord" (1999)
- "Toys and Flavours" (2000)
- "Hopeless Case of a Kid in Denial" (2000)
- "No Song Unheard" (2001)
- "Carry Me Home" (2002)
- "By the Grace of God" (2002)
- "Everything's on T.V." (2005)
- "I'm in the Band" (2005)
- "Bring It on Home" (2006)
- "The Same Lame Story" (2007)
- "In the Sign of the Octopus" (2008)
- "Darling Darling" (2008)

== Other appearances ==
Year	Title	Notes
1996	Frank wants you to join the 1996 Punk Rock'n'Roll Horrorshow: Released: August, 1996; Label: Frank Records; Format: 10" vinyl	The Hellacopters recorded a cover of the Kiss song "All American Man".
1997	Hell on Earth: A Tribute to the Misfits: Released: Label: Cleopatra Records; Format: CD	The band recorded a cover version of "Bullet" for this Misfits tribute.
1999	Flattery - A Tribute to Radio Birdman: Released: September, 1999; Label: Fandango Records; Format: CD	The band recorded "Time to Fall" on this Radio Birdman tribute.
2002	Nationalsånger - Hymner från Vågen och EPAs torg: Released: Label: National; Format: CD	The band recorded "Sent en Lördagskväll" for this tribute to progg band Nationalteatern, this is the band's only recording with Swedish lyrics.
2002	The Song Ramones the Same: Released: 15 April 2002; Label: White Jazz Records; Format: CD	The band recorded "What'd You Do" for this Ramones tribute.
2004	St. Valentines Killers: Released: Label: Butcher's Hook; Format: 12" vinyl	A compilation containing the a version of the Smokey Robinson song "Little Miss Sweetness".
2007	Ge Fan I Våra Vatten: Released: 18 May 2007; Label: Format: CD	The band recorded "A View From Nowhere" for this charity album, which raises money to help save the northern pike and the atlantic salmon.

== DVDs ==
Year	Title
2003	Goodnight Cleveland: Released: 29 November 2003; Label: 8th Grade Films; Format: DVD
TBA	Upcoming live DVD: Released: TBA; Label: -; Format: DVD
