= List of The Hellacopters members projects =

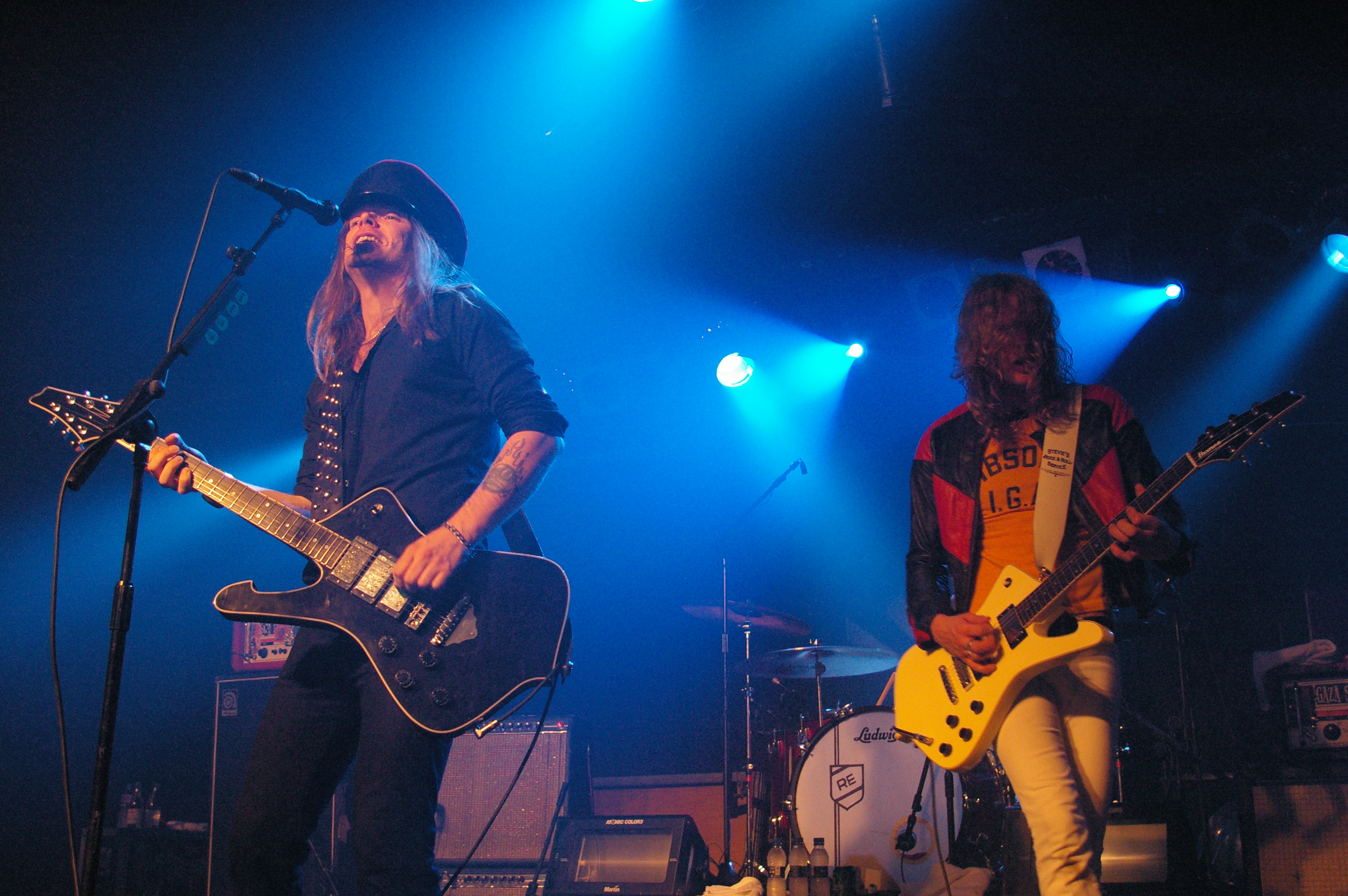
Nicke Andersson and Robert Dahlqvist onstage in Barcelona during The Tour Before the Fall in 2008, shortly before the band's break up in October the same year.

The Hellacopters are a Swedish rock band, active between 1994 and 2008 and again since 2016. The band was formed by vocalist and guitarist Nicke Andersson, guitarist Dregen, bassist Kenny Håkansson and drummer Robban Eriksson, later keyboard player Anders Lindström joined the band. In 1997 guitarist Dregen left the band in order to focus fully on his other band The Backyard Babies, the band quickly recruited Danne Andersson and later Mattias Hellberg as temporary replacements in order to complete the band's European and American tour. After recording the band's third album Robert Dahlqvist was hired as a full-time replacement for Dregen and solidified the band's line up. Besides recording prolifically with seven studio albums, six Ep's, two compilations of rarities and non album material as well as numerous other releases and collaborations the band's members have been active in various other side projects.

== Cold Ethyl ==
Cold Ethyl was formed during The Tour Before the Fall by Nicke Andersson along with Thomas Eriksson, Tobias Egge and Dolf De Borst from The Datsuns who opened up for The Hellacopters during the last leg of the tour. The band claims to have no interest in recording or releasing any original material and considers itself to be more of a house band than a recording and touring band. The band played their first show at Debaser Stockholm January 30, 2009, with set consisting mostly of 1970s rock songs.

Members:

- Nicke Andersson - lead vocals, guitar
- Tobias Egge - lead vocals, guitar
- Dolf De Borst - lead vocals, bass
- Thomas Eriksson - drums

== Daemon ==
Daemon was formed by Anders Lundemark of the Danish metal band Konkhra and Nicke Andersson and released their debut album Seven Deadly Sins in 1996. The album was a concept album with one song based around the theme of each sins and an eight instrumental song called "Eight Sin" and part of the film Seven incorporated into the music. After the release of the band's debut album Andersson left the band to focus fully on The Hellacopters and Entombed which he at that point was still a member in. Since the band has released two more album, The Second Coming in 1999 and Eye for an Eye in 2002.

Members

- Anders Lundmark - vocals, guitar
- Thomas Fagerlind - bass
- Gene Hoglan - drums

Former members

- Nicke Andersson - drums
- Frank Hellmet - drums

== Death Breath ==
Death Breath was formed in 2005 by Nicke Andersson and Robert Pehrsson, the band plays what they consider to be old school death metal without modern elements such as keyboards and seven string guitars. Soon after the band was put together enough material to fill three albums was written, along with Jörgen Sandström, Fred Estby and other friends the band started recording material. The band released a self-titled 7" single in 2006 which was followed by their debut album Stinking Up the Night the same year and the Ep Let It Stink the following year.

Members

- Nicke Andersson - drums, guitar, bass
- Robert Pehrsson - vocals, guitar

Other contributors

- Fred Estby - vocals
- Jörgern Sandström - vocals
- Erik Sahlström - vocals
- Scott Carlsson - vocals, bass
- Erik Wallin - guitar
- Mange Hedqvist - bass

== Dundertåget ==
Dunder Tåget was originally formed in 2004 under the name Thunder Express taken from an MC5 song. The band released two records under that name before changing their name to Dunder Tåget, a rough Swedish translation of Thunder Express. With the help of Swedish singer/songwriter Stefan Sundström who wrote the majority of the Swedish lyrics the band released their debut album Skaffa Ny Frisyr in 2009. April 21, 2010 the band will release their second album Dom Feta Åren är Förbi.

Members:

- Robert Dahlqvist - lead vocals, guitar
- Robert Pehrsson - backing vocals, guitar
- Jens Lagergren - bass
- Jesper karlsson - drums

Other contributors:

- Stefan Sundström - songwriting
- Mattias Hellberg - harmonica

== Kurt-Sunes med Helveteshundarna ==
Kurt-Sunes med Helveteshundarna (Kurt-Sunes with the hell hounds) was formed by Nicke Andersson and Johan Johansson from The Diamond Dogs, KSMB and Strindbergs. The band's first and so far only release came in 2004 with the single "(Komma Ut Ur Matchen) NU!", a Swedish version of the Supershitty to the Max! opening track "(Gotta Get Some Action) NOW". A newly recorded version with new lyrics of the KSMB's song "8 PM" was also included as a b-side to the single.

Members:

- Nicke Andersson - vocals, guitar
- Johan Johansson - vocals, bass, drums

Other contributors:

- Sulo - vocals
- Dregen - guitar
- Anders Lindström - piano
- Stefan Björk - bass
- Peter Ampull - guitar
- Lutten - drums

== Supershit 666 ==
Supershit 666 was a short-lived supergroup formed by Dregen and Nicke Andersson from The Hellacopters, along with producer Thomas Skogsberg and David "Ginger" Walls from The Wildhearts. The group's only release was their self-titled EP from 1999. While Dregen has expressed interest in recording with the group again, no new material has been written since the EP was released.

Members:

- Ginger - vocals, guitar
- Dregen - guitar
- Thomas Skogsberg - bass
- Nicke Andersson - drums

== The Bitter Twins ==
The Bitter Twins was formed by Anders Lindström and Sören "Sulo" Karlsson in 2007. The two had previously played together in The Diamond Dogs which Lindström left in 1996 to join The Hellacopters. The original idea for the band was to play the depressive type of rock the two started playing twenty years earlier, but the direction of the music changed to a sound more inspired by The Clash circa 1978 to 1982. The two have also enlisted the help of other high profiled musicians such as Papa Dee, Anders Hernestam, Stefan Björk, Mattias Bärjed, Brian Robertson and Nicke Andersson to record their debut album Global Panic.

Members:

- Sören " Sulo" Karlsson - vocals
- Anders Lindström - guitar, keyboard

Other contributors

- Papa Dee - toasting
- Nicke Andersson - lead guitar, vocals
- Brian Robertson - lead guitar
- Stefan Björk - bass
- Robert Eriksson - |drums
- Magnus Carlson - backing vocals
- Ola Nyström - slide guitar
- Magic - horns
- Henrik Widén - moog
- Anders Härnestam - drums
- Micke Borg - guitar

== The Hydromatics ==
The Hydromatics was formed by Nicke Andersson and Tony Slug of Amsterdam punk band Nitwitz, the two had long planned to record a number of Sonic's Rendezvous Band covers. During The Hellacopters second visit to Detroit the duo got in contact with original Sonic's Rendezvous Band vocalist Scott Morgan, who accepted the invitation to record with the group. in 1999 the three meet up in Amsterdam and along with Theo Brouwer the group recorded their debut album Part Unknown and toured through Europe which resulted in the six track live album Fluid Drive. After the tour Andersson left the band due to his commitments with The Hellacopters, the band however has continued to occasionally record and tour to this day.

Members:

- Scott Morgan - lead vocals, guitar, harmonica
- Tony Slug - guitar
- Ries Doms - drums
- Theo Brouwer - bass guitar
- Kent Steedman - guitar

Previous members:

- Nicke Andersson - drums, percussion, backing vocals
- Laurent Ciron - bass guitar
- Andy Frost - drums

== The Solution ==
The Solution was after Nicke Anderssons departure from The Hydromatics, Andersson and Scott Morgan kept in touch and in 2004 Morgan traveled to Sweden to record the debut album of Soulmover, during the recording the name was however changed to The Solution. The band's debut album Communicate! was released the same year and contained original material written by both Morgan and Andersson as well as covers from Curtis Mayfield, Tony Joe White. The follow-up was released in 2007 and besides original work contained covers of Albert King, Staple Singers and Loretta Lynn.

Members:

- Scott Morgan - lead vocals, guitar, harmonica
- Nicke Andersson - drums, percussion, guitar, backing vocals
- Henke "The Duke of Honk" Wilden - piano, organ
- Jim Heneghan - bass guitar
- Mattias Hellberg - rhythm guitar, lead guitar
- Linn Segolson - backing vocals
- Clarisse Muvemba - backing vocals
- Cecilia Gärding - backing vocals
- Jennifer Strömberg - backing vocals
- Linnea Sporre - backing vocals
- Gustav Bendt - saxophone
- Emil Strandberg - trumpet

Other contributors:

- Robert Dahlqvist - lead guitar on Soulmover

== Thunder Express ==
Thunder Express was started as a side project by Robert Dahlqvist along with Robert Pehrsson, Jens Langren and Jesper Karlsson. The band describes their music as inspired by The Rolling Stones, Cheap Trick, The Faces and early material from ZZ Top. The band released their debut album We Play for Pleasure in 2004, which was followed up with Republic Disgrace in 2007. While Dahlqvist still was playing with The Hellacopters he considered Thunder Express to be a side project, after the breakup of The Hellacopters the Swedish language incarnation of the band - Dunder Tåget - to be his main focus.

Members:

- Robert Dahlqvist - guitar and vocals
- Robert Pehrsson - guitar and harmonies
- Jens Lagergren - bass
- Jesper Karlsson - drums

Other contributors;

- Ebbot Lundberg - songwriting
- Nathan Larson - songwriting
- Kenny Håkansson - songwriting
- Anders Osborne - songwriting
- Martin Hederos - piano, organ
- Henrik Widen - piano
- Magnus Jonsson - trumpet
- Mattias Hellberg - harmonica
- Jaqee - vocals

== Tramp ==
Tramp was formed by Robban Eriksson along with members from Swedish rock bands Henry Fiats Open Sore and Captain Murphy. The currently unsigned band describes their music as more dramatic than The Hellacopters and more similar to the early works of Alice Cooper.

== Urrke T & the Midlife Crisis ==
Urrke T & the Midlife Crisis is a semiactive punkband formed by Robban Eriksson and Dregen along with Urrke T from Maryslim and Måns P Månsson from the Maggots. The band released a three-song single in 2004 consisting of covers of old punk songs. The single was followed up in 2007 with a 7" vinyl single with another set of punk covers.

Members:

- Urrke T - vocals, bass
- Dregen - guitar, backing vocals
- Robban Eriksson - drums
- Måns P Månsson - guitar

== Wild Kings ==
Wild Kings was formed in 2003 as part of a tribute show held by the record company Wild Kingdom for the Swedish rock band The Nomads. The band has since become that house band consisting of Robban Eriksson, producer Chips Kiesbye and a revolving line up of other members.

Members:

- Chips Kiesbye - vocals, guitar
- Robban Eriksson - drums

Other contributors:

- Nicke Andersson - vocals guitar
- Dregen - vocals, guitar
- Maria Andersson - vocals, guitar
- Pelle Almqvist - vocals
