= Psychout Records =

Swedish record label

- Founded: 1995
- Founder: Nicke Andersson
- Genre: Rock, punk, power pop
- Country of origin: Sweden
- Location: Stockholm

Psychout Records is an independent record label founded by Nicke Andersson primarily to release material with his band The Hellacopters.

== History ==
The idea to start his own label came after experiencing problems with record labels during his time as the drummer of the heavy metal band Entombed which made four years pass between Wolverine Blues from 1993 and its follow up DCLXVI: To Ride, Shoot Straight and Speak the Truth from 1997. While the label mostly has been used for Hellacopters releases other artist such as The Robots who released a tribute single to the Swedish Formula One driver Ronnie Peterson, as well as the Neil Leyton, Dregen and Nicke Anderssons collaboration The Point.

== Discography ==
Year	Artist	Release	Catalog Number	Ref
1995	The Hellacopters	"Killing Allan"	PSYCH001	
1996	The Robots	"Go, Go, Go"	PSYCH002	
1999	The Hellacopters	Grande Rock	PSYCH005	
2001	The Hellacopters, Adam West	The Hellacopters / Adam West	PSYCH006	
2002	The Hellacopters	Cream Of The Crap Vol. 1	-	
2004	The Hellacopters	Cream Of The Crap Vol. 2	-	
2006	The Hellacopters	Air Raid Serenades	-	
2007	The Hellacopters	Same Lame Story	PSYCH009	
2007	The Solution	Will Not Be Televised	-	
2009	The Point	TBA	-	
