= Joe Talbot =

Joe Talbot may refer to:

- Joe Talbot (filmmaker) (b. 1990), American filmmaker
- Joe Talbot (singer) (b. 1984), Welsh singer and songwriter, lead singer of the punk rock band Idles

== See also ==
- Joe Talbott, director of the 2000 film Eat Me!
