= Where the Action Is (disambiguation) =

Where the Action Is is an American music-based television variety show.

Where the Action Is may also refer to:

- Where the Action Is (Steve Alaimo album), 1965
- Where the Action Is (The Waterboys album), 2019
- "Where the Action Is" (song), a 1977 song by John Paul Young
- Where the Action Is! Los Angeles Nuggets: 1965–1968, a 2009 box set
- Where the Action Is Tour, a tour featuring Swedish rock bands
- Where the Action Is, a 2001 book by Paul Dourish
