= Psych-Out (disambiguation) =

Psych-Out is a 1968 counterculture film.

Psych Out, Psychout, or Psyche-Out may also refer to:

- "Psych Out" (NCIS), an episode of NCIS
- Psychout Records, a Swedish independent record label
- Psyche-Out, a character from the G.I. Joe franchise
