= Eat Me! (2000 film) =

2000 American comedy film

- Directed by: Joe Talbott
- Written by: Kevin McMahon; Joe Talbott
- Starring: Waleed Zuaiter; Ron Jeremy; Rhea Seehorn
- Release date: 2000
- Country: United States
- Language: English

Eat Me! is a 2000 comedy film directed by Joe Talbott and starring Waleed Zuaiter, Ron Jeremy and Rhea Seehorn.

== Plot ==
An eclectic group of bachelors share a house in Washington, D.C., and find that life past the Generation-X years doesn't get any easier. Gary is the den mother, who presides over director Mike, Sean the druggie and doctor Barrie. Together with Glynna they take on everyone from utility companies to drug dealers.

== Cast ==
- Kris Arnold as Sean
- Jack Daniel as Gary
- Andy Rapoport as Mike
- Waleed Zuaiter as Barry
- Rhea Seehorn as Glynna
- Christopher Walker as D.D.
- Ron Hyatt as Porno Jack
- Bill Delaney as Daryl
- Claiborne Lashley as Puck
- Steve Carpenter as Loan Officer
- Kimberly Skyrme as Susan
- Jimmy Gallagher as Banker
- Chris Lane as Porno Actor
- Jon Sherman as Annoying Guy
- Shari Lewis as Tidy Girl
- Anthony Agnew as Police Officer
- Ian LeValley as Dave
- Kerri Rambow

== Release ==
The film was screened at the American Paviliaon of the Cannes Film Festival and in sidebar screenings in Park City at the Sundance Film Festival.

== Awards ==
- Washington Film and Video Council - Best Original Screenplay

== Soundtrack ==
The soundtrack included music by the bands Kingface, Peter Hayes Condition, Citizen Cope and many others.

- Peter Hayes Condition - "Am On"
- Lu Bango - "Any Day"
- Citizen Cope - "Daughters Of The Stage"
- Peter Hayes Condition - "Get A Little Closer"
- Adam West - "Haunted"
- Con - "Heaven 1999"
- Sampson - "House Of Ruth"
- Kingface - "I Believe"
- Johnny Nash - "I Can See Clearly"
- The Space Cossacks - "Journey To The Stars"
- Dana Cerick - "Last Match"
- Kingface - "Learn To Love The Leash"
- Cosmos Factor - "Maya"
- Sam Spencer - "Our Time In The World"
- Sam Spencer - "Pass Down"
- Mike Shupp - "River To The Sea"
- Citizen Cope - "Shotguns"
- Adam West - "Speedbump"
- Boomslang - "Suitcase"
- James Brown - "Superbad, Pts. 1 & 2"
- Sam Spencer - "Tell Me"
- Coppershop - "That Was Me Yesterday"
- Tuscadero - "The Game Song"
- Eric Brace and Last Train Home - "True North"
