= Mattias Hellberg =

Swedish musician (born 1973)

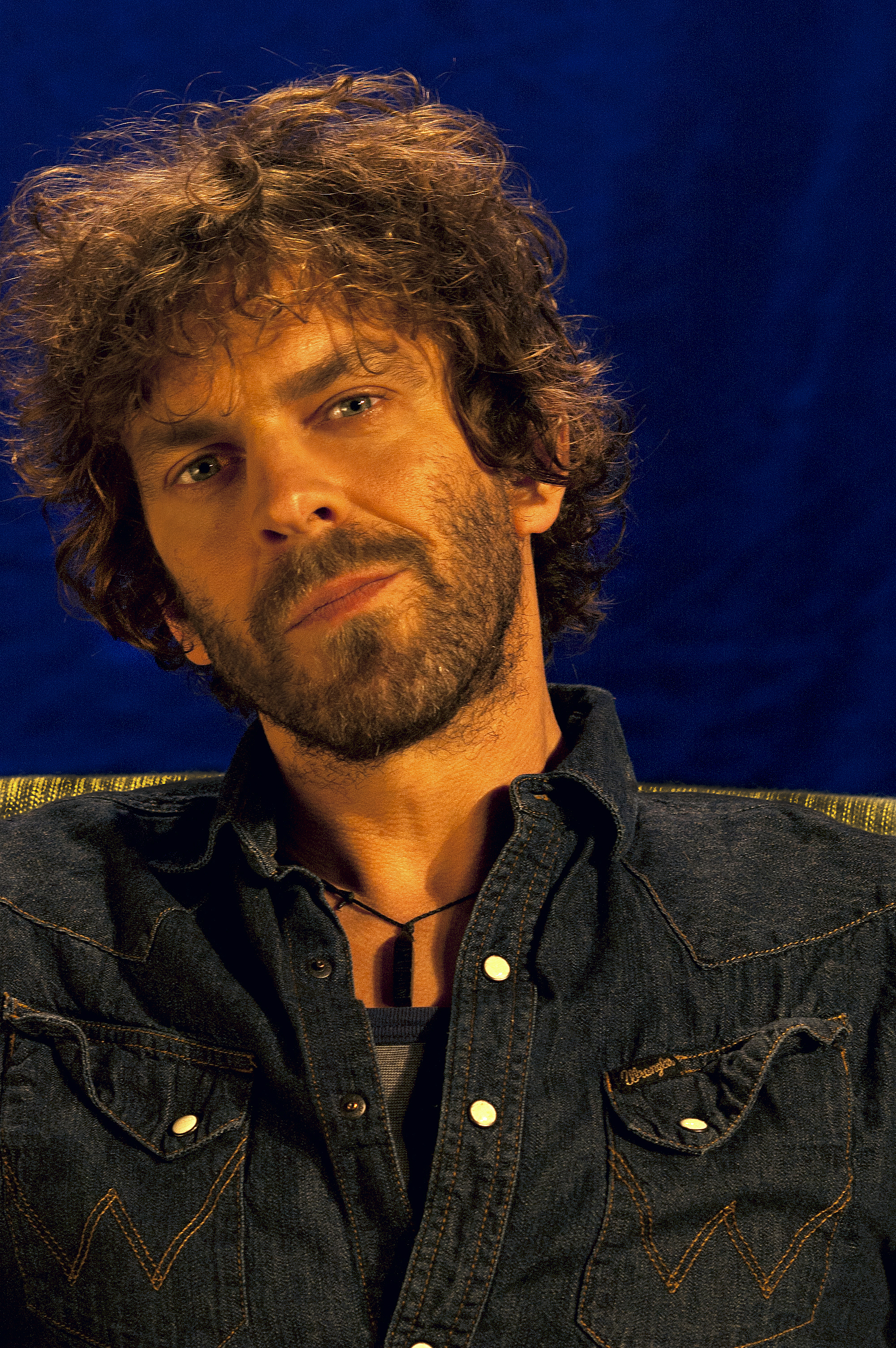
- Hellberg in 2013

Background information
- Born: Mattias Hellberg; 13 June 1973 (age 53)
- Genres: Garage rock, punk rock, garage punk, blues, blues rock, punk blues, reggae, progg, soul, blue-eyed soul
- Occupations: Musician, songwriter
- Instruments: Vocals, guitar, harmonica, bass, flute, percussion, banjo
- Labels: Silence, Help Records, Gravitation, Fargo Records, Gabel Recordings, Ramblin Records, Playground Music, Devil Duck records, Kning disk
- Website: matthiashellberg.com

Mattias Hellberg (born 13 June 1973) is a Swedish musician. Hellberg has worked with a variety of Swedish bands and artists in different genres, both as a permanent member and as guest or session member.

== Recording career ==
Hellberg's career started when his band Nymphet Noodlers was discovered and later produced by Ebbot from The Soundtrack of our Lives. Wayne Kramer of the MC5 once said that the Nymphet Noodlers was one of his favorite bands. Nymphet Noodlers broke up in 1996, but was reunited for a concert at Way out West August 2011. Former Nymphet colleagues Hederos and Hellberg recorded 8 cover songs meant to be a demo to get gigs in bars in 1996. Old friend Niclas Stenholm released the songs on the album M. Hederos M. Hellberg in 2000. Hederos & Hellberg turned out to be a totally unexpected success. Ryan Adams discovered the duo when he was playing his first concert in Gothenburg, and he brought them with him on a European tour as Hederos & Hellberg's second album, "Together in the darkness" was released in 2001. January 2003 they did a last performance in a sold out Gothenburg Concert House. After Dregen's departure from The Hellacopters Hellberg was drafted as a live member before Robert Dahlqvist joined as a full-time guitarist. Hellberg later worked with Hellacopters front man Nick Royale and Scott Morgan's soul band The Solution and guitarist Robert Dahlqvist solo effort Thunder Express. When the legendary Swedish progg band Nationalteatern reunited in the 1990s Hellberg was brought on board as their new vocalist. He also performed live with the band's former vocalist Totta Näslund as a backup due to Näslund's health problems. In 2000 the band Kanzeon was formed the band release a self-titled album in 2007 with a number of guest vocalists. In 2004 he worked with singer/songwriter Stefan Sundström's album "Fula gubben Hitler" and also went on tour to support the album.

== Selected discography ==
Here is a list of albums Hellberg has written or played music on as a session musician or as a full-time member.

- Nymphet Noodlers – Going Abroad (1994)
- Allimony – Bottomless (1999)
- The Hellacopters – Grande Rock (1999)
- Hederos & Hellberg – Hederos & Hellberg (2000)
- Hederos & Hellberg – Together in the Darkness (2001)
- The Hellacopters – Cream of the Crap Vol. 1 (2002)
- Ossler – Den siste som kom ut (2002)
- The Hellacopters – By the Grace of God (2002)
- Marit Bergman – 3.00 am. Serenades (2003)
- Solowork – Mattias Hellberg (2004)
- Stefan Sundström – Fula gubben Hitler (2004)
- The Solution – Communicate! (2004)
- The Soundtrack of Our Lives – Origin Vol. 1 (2005)
- Nationalteatern – Nationalteatern Rockorkester LIVE (2006)
- Nikola Šarčević – Rock Roll And Flee (2006)
- Thunder Express – Republic Disgrace (2007)
- Jaqee – Nouvelle d'amour (2007)
- Kanzeon – 'Kanzeon (2007)
- Mattias Hellberg & The White Moose – Out of the frying pan, into the woods (2008)
- The Solution – Will Not Be Televised (2008)
- Dunder Tåget – Skaffa ny frisyr (2009)
