= Demons (band) =

Swedish punk rock band

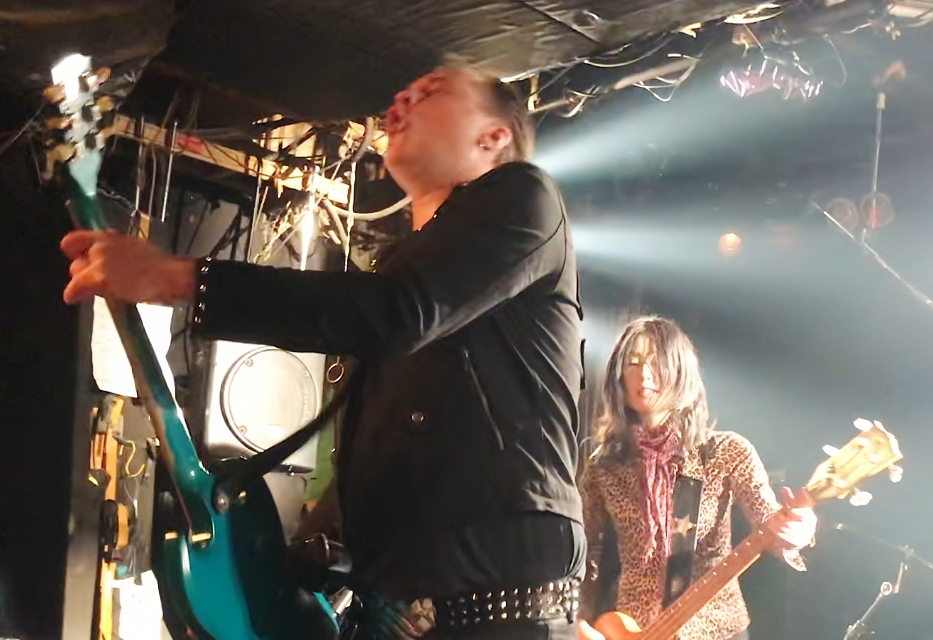
- "Demons" live in Japan 2020

Background information
- Origin: Stockholm, Sweden
- Genres: Rock, garage rock, garage punk, garage rock revival, punk rock, hard rock, power pop
- Years active: 1994/1995–present
- Labels: Alaska Productions, Glunk Records, Gearhead, Steer, Ruff Nite, Savage Magic Records, Ghost Highway Recordings, Retro Vox Records, RYOW-Ken Records, Lux Noise Records, Tornado Ride Records, Vitriola Recordings, Orible Records Dragstrip Riot
- Members: Mathias "Hep Cat Matt" Carlsson; Micke Jacobsson; Tomo Sukenobu
- Website: Official Facebook

"Demons" are a punk rock/garage punk group from Sweden. The band includes quotation marks in their name to differentiate themselves from other bands with a similar name. Their music has been described as "punk 'n' roll", but the band claims it should only be described as high-energy rock. Their musical style relies heavily on the energy derived from punk rock. Influences include 1960s garage rock bands such as The Sonics, The Standells and Shadows of Knight, The Velvet Underground, The Stooges and New York Dolls; and punk rock bands such as The Damned, Misfits, The Heartbreakers and The Saints; and early hardcore punk bands such as Black Flag, Bad Brains and Dead Kennedys. "Demons" has often been compared to contemporary groups like New Bomb Turks, The Hellacopters and Electric Frankenstein.

The band established themselves in the mid-1990s Swedish punk/garage rock scene with releases such as Electrocute and "Demons"... Come Bursting Out!. "Demons" initially gained more popularity in the United States than in their homeland, and thus much of their music has been released on American record labels, most notably Gearhead Records based in Oakland, California. They have completed several US and European tours, including two appearances at SXSW as well as two tours of Japan.

The Hellacopters recorded a cover version of Electrocute for their final album Head Off in 2008.

During "Demons" existence, other groups have used the same name. Actions have been taken to prevent the issue.

== Band history ==
In the late 1980s, Mathias Carlsson and Stefan Jonsson, both just thirteen years old at the time, formed the band Jawbation with school friends. Drummer Mikael Jacobsson joined later. Jawbation slowly disintegrated and morphed into a new band in 1994, which they named "Demons" on the advice of Lux Interior and Poison Ivy from The Cramps.

A session was recorded in 1995 which was supposed to be the band's debut album. It was never released but used as a promotion cassette called Strings for Hanging and Twanging. In the mid-to-late-1990s, "Demons" tracks appeared on multiple compilation releases such as Another Real Cool Time – Distorted Sounds from the North and released their debut singleElectrocute on Ruff Nite Records. Their six-track EP "Demons"... Come Bursting Out! was released in 1998. The album was recorded in Sunlight Studio with Tomas Skogsberg (known for his work with The Hellacopters as well as several notable Swedish death metal bands such as Entombed). The band signed with Gearhead Records in 1999, and released their debut album Riot Salvation in 2000.

After the release of Scarcity Rock and its following tour in 2011 the band took a break. They resurfaced for a show in 2015 and recordings followed. In 2016 the Electrocute single was reissued for Record Store Day. In March 2017 the brand new single Kids are Gonna Cry was released by Alaska Productions. It had a strong anti fascist message. The next single was a split with UK's The Hip Priests, a collaboration with Savage Magic Records and Cracking Stuff Records. It was released in March 2018. After that "Demons" put out ...Was Here on Ghost Highway Recordings. The band also appeared on the festivals Drenched in Beer and Gutter Island Garage Rock Festival.

Several more records was released in 2018 as well as appearances with material in films, on soundtracks, compilations and split singles. On April 30, 2019 the band's first full-length in nine years, Kiss Off was released. It was highly anticipated and got great reviews.

In January 2020 "Demons" did a short tour of Japan to prepare for what was going to be their 25th anniversary as a band. When the pandemic hit their whole anniversary tour was cancelled and no shows were played. Even so, the band decided to release a couple of archival albums starting with No Loitering - Burn Down the Club! recorded live at the Crocodile Cafe, Seattle, USA in 2004.

During the pandemic "Demons" recorded several sessions which eventually resulted in the album Rock & Roll with the Punches. It was marketed as a 25 year anniversary project and contained new versions of older material. Several guests appeared from groups like The Dragons, The Robots, The Bronx, The Vanjas, and The Hip Priests among others. The album was finally released in December 2022.

== Albums and tours ==
In September 2001, "Demons" embarked on their first American tour. They were part of a package including The Nomads and The Fleshtones. The Nomads resigned from the tour following the September 11 attacks on World Trade Center. In March 2002, the band went on their second US tour. They began recording their follow up album Stockholm Slump with Tomas Skogsberg shortly after the tour ended. Before the album was mixed, "Demons" headed out to play the Scandinavian Gearfests (music festival coordinated by Gearhead Records) held in Stockholm, Helsinki and Oslo. After the album's release, they embarked on another coast-to-coast US tour, with the New Bomb Turks, co headlining the American Gearfest festival in Austin, Texas. "Demons" performed extensively throughout Europe in 2003. They toured the US again in 2004 after the release of Demonology – If You Can't Join Us Beat Us, a collection of tracks from compilations and other rare recordings. In 2006, the band toured Scandinavia, Italy, Slovenia and Croatia.

Following the release of the critically acclaimed album Ace In The Hole, the band joined The Hellacopters for twelve shows on their farewell tour The Tour Before The Fall. Some shows also included New Zealand band The Datsuns. The Hellacopters also covered the "Demons" song Electrocute on the album Head Off. "Demons" continued to promote Ace In The Hole on tours in Sweden and Italy throughout 2009. A single My Bleeding Heart was lifted off the album for release and came out on the Italian label Tornado Ride.

At the end of 2010 "Demons" released the album Scarcity Rock which was more experimental than earlier releases. The band recorded most of it themselves on a portable studio in their rehearsal space. It was self-released on red vinyl with a free CD inside. Tours in Italy and Germany followed. After this the band took a four-year break and resurfaced with a show, the reissue of Electrocute and the new singles Kids are Gonna Cry, "DEMONS"/The Hip Priests and ... Was Here as well as a collaboration album, On the Streets and In Our Hearts with punk rock legend Jeff Dahl.

In April 2019 the band released the full-length album Kiss Off on Glunk Records and Alaska Productions. The album was greatly received and voted one of the best album of 2019 by several publications. The magazine Classic Rock gave the album eight out of ten and called it "a veritable orgy of hard core rock'n'roll".

In January 2020 the band went back to Japan for a tour. They announced their 25th anniversary starting with a couple of archival releases including a live album called No Loitering - Burn Down the Club! recorded 2004 at the Crocodile Cafe in Seattle, USA.

During the pandemic the band recorded the anniversary album Rock & Roll with the Punches but hasn't been touring since 2020.

== Other projects ==
=== Jawbation ===
Mathias Carlsson and Stefan Jonsson's first band, Rabieshundarna was formed on a rooftop by high school friends in the late 80s. The band eventually evolved into Jawbation in the early 1990s. Jawbation spearheaded the early Scandirock and Action Rock movements bridging the garage rock sounds from the 80s with a rougher edge found in raw 70s rock, original punk rock and hardcore. The band morphed into an early incarnation of "Demons" in 1994. Jawbation never released anything but are now featured with the song Defacer on one volume of Sal Canzoineri's (of Electric Frankenstein) A Fistful More of Rock & Roll. Defacer was originally from the group's third session and recorded and mixed in early 1992.

=== The Crypt Kicker Five ===
In 1995, Carlsson formed the acoustic group The Crypt Kicker Five (also called The Crypt Kicker 5 and CK5) with Odd Ahlgren from The Robots and Vejde Gustavsson from Mazarine Street. Inspired by street music, primitive folk music, rhythm and blues and artists such as Dr John, they used a one-string acoustic guitar and homemade instruments to achieve a sound that mixed blues, gospel and country-inspired acoustic punk. Later additions to the group were Joakim Ericson from The Nomads, Anders Graham Paulsson formerly with Atomic Swing, and Gustav Bendt from Monster and Moneybrother on saxophone. As a six-piece, they have released two singles, and evolved a unique style, with Ahlgren as a confrontational front man and the band performing their street corner brand of voodoo blues.

=== Matching Numbers ===
In the late 1990s, Carlsson formed the garage band Matching Numbers with Odd Ahlgren (The Robots), Jocke Ericson (The Nomads), and Björn Grunner. In 1998, they recorded a version of Suzi Quatro's "Daytona Demon" for the compilation Swedish Sins '99, released by White Jazz Records. The band later included Anders Paulsson (Atomic Swing) on bass. Matching Numbers also appeared on the Spanish compilation Riot On The Rocks Vol 2 released by Safety Pin Records, and a split single with The Immortal Lee County Killers before disbanding in the early 2000s (decade).

=== More ===
Carlsson has also worked with Belinda Kordic (formerly with STABB), on her solo project, Killing Mood. On her debut album "Just Another Love Song" he contributed with guitar, slide guitar, harmonica and arrangements on several tracks.

Tristan Jeanneau who played bass with the band between 2004 and 2017 was also a member of The Vanjas.

Current bass player Tomo Sukenobu has played with numerous garage punk bands in Stockholm as well as being a member of Japanese band Macaroni.

== Band members ==
=== Current ===
- Mathias "Hep Cat Matt" Carlsson – guitars, lead vocals
- Micke Jacobsson – drums, backing vocals
- Tomoko Sukenobu – bass

=== Former ===
- Stefan Jonsson – guitar (years 1995–2005)
- "Muffins" Brink – bass (years 1995–2004)
- Tristan "TJ" Jeanneau – bass (years 2004–2017)

== Discography ==
=== Full-length albums ===
- Riot Salvation (Gearhead Records RPM 018) (LP/CD 10/00)
- Stockholm Slump (Gearhead Records RPM 032) (LP/CD 9/02)
- Demonology-If You Can't Join Us Beat Us (Gearhead Records RPM 042) (CD 3/04)
- R!ot in Japan (Ryow-Ken Record FZCY-9001/2) (2CD 4/04)
- Ace in the Hole (Alaska Productions ROAAR CD002) (CD/LP 09/08) – Originally scheduled for release in the Fall of 2007 by a new larger Swedish record label.
- Scarcity Rock (Alaska Productions ROAAR LP003) (LP/CD 11/10) – Album press sheet read: "Exploring dystopian subjects, the dark side of psychedelia and ugly forms of 1950s and 1960s subcultures, "Demons" has cooked up a gumbo that is Scarcity Rock." Released on vinyl with a free copy of the album in CD format. A promotional video directed by Matt Broadley was released for the opening track, "Signal Turns Red".
- On the Streets and In Our Hearts with Jeff Dahl (Ghost Highway GHR 191) (LP 10/18) – Mini album recorded together with Jeff Dahl.
- Kiss Off (Glunk Records 010) (CD 04/19) - vinyl release on Alaska Productions LP-ROAAR 007.
- No Loitering! - Burn Down the Club (Vitriola Recordings 222-A) (CD 09/20) - live document from the 2004 US tour.
- Rock & Roll with the Punches (Alaska Productions ROAAR 008) (CD 12/22) - 25 year anniversary album with guests containing new versions of older material.

=== EPs and 10" ===
- "Demons" ...Come Burst!ng Out! (Steer Records 10.001) (10" 12/98) – Re-released by Gearhead Records on CD and 12" in September 2000
- (Her Name Was) Tragedy EP (Alaska Productions/Swedish Punks RAM 001) (CD 10/06) – Stefan Jonsson left the band for personal reasons prior to recording the EP, "Demons" continued as a trio.

=== Singles and 7" ===
- "Electrocute" (Ruff Nite Records RNR 007) (7"- single 11/97) – B side contains tracks "Run Me Over" and "Some Days Are Worse Than Others". All three were written by singer/guitarist Mathias "Hep Cat Matt" Carlsson. The record was exclusively printed on black and red vinyl, with only 1,000 copies made. In 2016 the single was reissued for Record Store Day in a remastered, limited edition, coloured vinyl, hand numbered release housed in its intended original cover. It also had extensive liner notes by Carlsson.
- "My Bleeding Heart" (Tornado Ride) (7"-single 02/09) – The Swedish magazine Denimzine awarded the single a "nine out of ten".
- "Kids are Gonna Cry/Déjà Vu You" (Alaska Productions ROAAR 005) (7"- single 02/17) – Kids are Gonna Cry has a strong anti fascist message.
- "DEMONS"/The Hip Priests" (Savage Magic Records/Cracking Stuff Records SM-038, CS-002) (7"- single 03/18) – Split EP with fellow rockers The Hip Priests.
- "...Was Here" (Ghost Highway Recordings GHR 182) (7" – single 06/18) – Contains the songs Street Corner of No Return and Satellite Town
- "Bad Neighbourhood/I'd Much Rather Be With the Girls" (Lux Noise Records 19240) (7" – single 12/18)

=== Compilations ===
- Another Real Cool Time – More Distorted Sounds from the North (Fuzzbomb Records Fuzz 001) (CD 11/96)
- Hell On Earth: Hail to Misfits (Tribute Records Tr 004) (CD 2/97) (re released in USA by Cleopatra in 2000)
- Stranded in a Dolls House: A Tribute to Johnny Thunders and Jerry Nolan (Hurtin' Records 005) (CD 5/97)
- Weird, Waxed and Wired (Radio Blast Records RBO 19) (DLP 6/98)
- Swedish Sins ´99 (White Jazz Records Jazz 014) (CD 3/99)
- Flattery: A Tribute to Radio Birdman Vol 2 (NoMango Records Mark Ivb/fr-016b) (CD 2/00)
- Riot on the Rocks Vol 2 (Safety Pin Records Sprotrcd 002) (CD 9/00)
- Smash Up Derby (Gearhead Records RPM 041) (CD 2/03)
- The Thingmaker (Gearhead Records RPM 051) (CD 2/04)
- Welcome to Gearhead Country (Gearhead Records RPM 061) (CD02/06)
- A Fistful of Rock'n'roll Volume 13 (A) (Carbon 14 Magazine – #29) (CD 06/06)
- Flattery: A Tribute to Radio Birdman Vol 3 (NoMango Records Mark Ivc/fr-016c) (CD 4/07) – A "Best Of" was released on Ghost Highway Records in November 2014 it included Radios Appear Medley by "Demons" with Nicke Andersson on second guitar,
- Bootleg Series Vol 1 (Up North/Downunder) (Bootleg Booze – Booze 024) (LP 12/09)
- The Best Of Flattery A Tribute To Radio Birdman (Ghost Highway Recordings GHR 100) (DLP + 7"-single 11/14)
- Alternative Rock Mach One (Bongo Boy Records) (LP/CD 7/2018)
- Demolition Derby (Retro Vox RVX016) (10" 9/18) Contains two exclusive tracks each by "Demons", King Mastino, Black Gremlin and Scumbag Millionaire.
- Ginge Knievil's Top of the Pops 2018 (GKTOTP GK001) (DCD 12/2018) Charity CD for mental Health Matters Wales.
- A Fistful More of Rock & Roll Volume 4 (AFMORR) (1/2019) "Demons" and Jeff Dahl are featured with the song Lisa's World
- A Fistful More of Rock & Roll Volume 14 (AFMORR) (1/2019) "Demons" are featured with the song Mojo Rojo
- A Tribute to Dead Moon (Chaputa Records/Ghost Highway Recordings) (2x10" 05/2019) The album was released as a double vinyl ten inch in both black and white vinyl versions. "Demons" are featured with a version of Out on a Wire.
- No Heroes No Leaders No Artists No Gods (A Tribute To The New Bomb Turks) (Dragstrip Riot Records/Spaghetty Town Records/Ghost Highway Recordings GHR-230/STR-027/DRL004) (LP 5/2021) This record was released in four versions with black, white, orange and red vinyl. "Demons" contribute with a version of Pretty Lightning.
- Short & Swede (Ghost Highway Recordings GHR-277) (7" 10/2022) - 33 rpm collection of 14 Swedish bands doing a one minute song each.
