= Matz Robert Eriksson =

Robert Eriksson
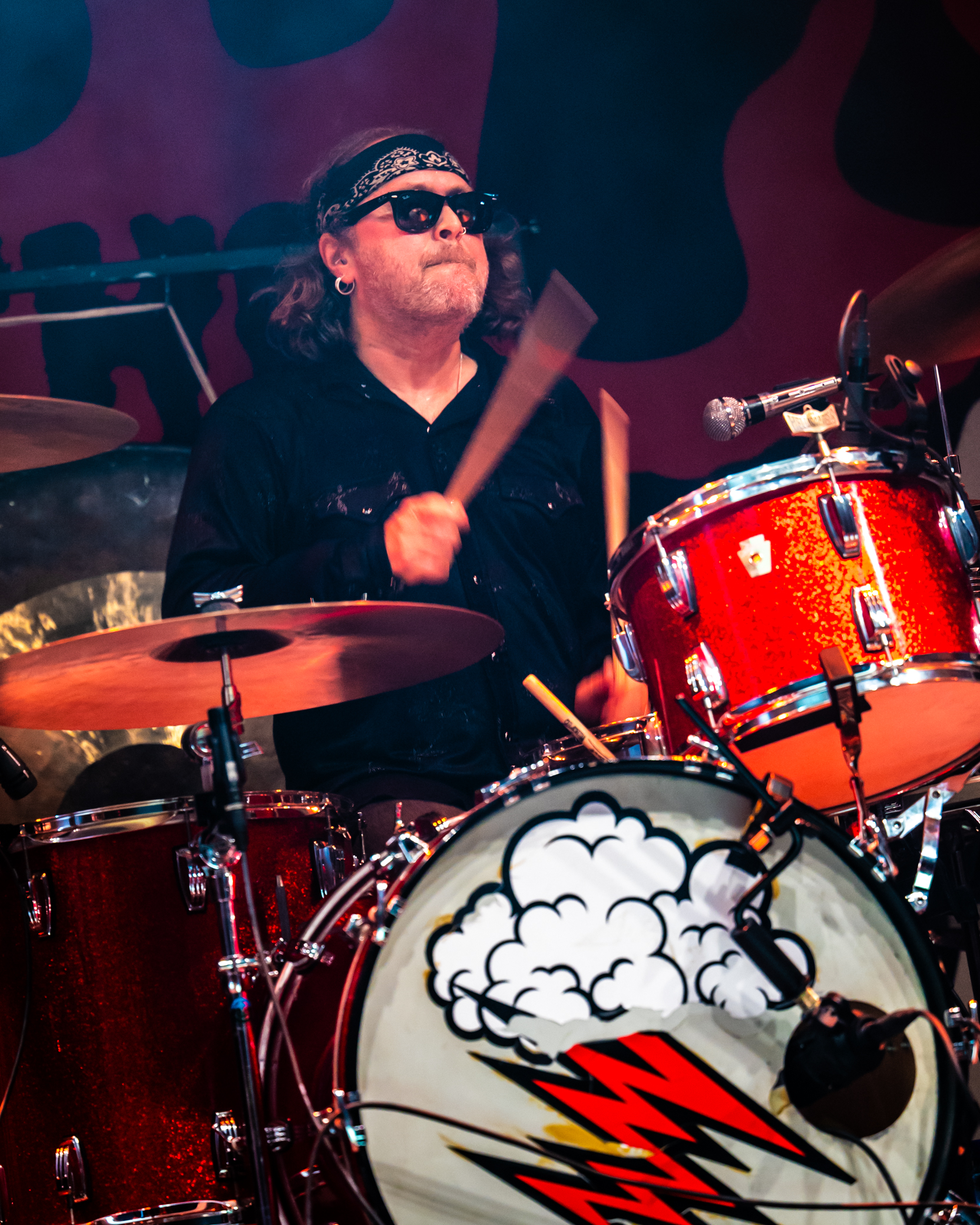
- Eriksson in 2024

Background information
- Also known as: Robban, Robert Hellacopter, Bruce Lee Hellacopter, Rockanimal
- Born: Matz Robert Eriksson; 7 March 1972 (age 54)
- Genres: Garage rock, rock, garage punk, punk rock, power pop, garage rock revival
- Occupations: Musician, songwriter
- Instruments: Drums, percussion, vocals
- Years active: 1988 - present
- Labels: Psychout Records, Mans Ruin Records, Sub Pop Records, Lookout! Records, Sweet Nothing Records, Universal Music, White Jazz Records, Gearhead Records, Bang!, Polar Music International, Bad Afro Records, Liquor and Poker Music, Wild Kingdom. Bootleg Booze Records

Robert Eriksson or simply Robban as he is often called, is best known as the drummer of Swedish rock band The Hellacopters, who were active between 1994 and 2008. Eriksson is currently playing With his new band called Tramp and recently reunited Swedish punk band Strindbergs.

== Biography ==
=== Early life and career ===
Eriksson was born in Eskilstuna and moved a few years later to Edsbyn. He got his first drumkit at the age of 13 but didn't get a hi-hat or a cymbal until the next year when he had saved up enough money. Eriksson soon started discovering bands and artists such as Elvis Presley, The Beatles, Hep Stars and The Spotnicks. Later he discovered bands such as Iron Maiden, Kiss and Saxon through a relative who worked at a Swedish booking agency. Soon Eriksson started playing drums in various punk, rock and metal bands and got to know Nicke Andersson the drummer of heavy metal band Entombed.

=== The Hellacopters ===
In 1994 Andersson approached him and offered him to play drums in his new band that he was forming with Dregen and childhood friend Kenny Håkansson. The Hellacopters went on to become one of the more important rock bands in the Nordic region and has released six albums with their own material, a cover album, two non album work compilations and a greatest hits album. The band has also toured all over the world and opened up for bands such as Kiss, The Rolling Stones and ZZ Top. In late 2007 the band announced their retirement after the release of Head Off, a collection of their favorite songs recorded by the band. The band finished with four shows in two days that were filmed and broadcast on the band's MySpace page, a double live album and a DVD is currently in the works.

=== Tramp ===
Eriksson is also working with his currently unsigned rock band Tramp, which features members from the Turpentines, Henry Fiat's Open Sore and Captain Murphy. The band is currently unsigned and have two songs released on their official MySpace, Eriksson describes the band's sound as more dramatic similar to early Alice Cooper records.

=== Other work ===
2003 Eriksson joined an all star lineup of Swedish rock musicians to pay tribute to The Nomads, the members of the band liked it so much that the Wild Kings as they called themselves, decided to start the monthly Wild Kingdom club. In 2004 Eriksson participated in a one-day project along with Dregen (Backyard Babies), Måns P. Månsson (The Maggots) and Urkke T (Mary Slim). The band which named themselves Urkke T & the Midlife Crisis released Ask Not What You Can Do For Your Country... in 2004. Currently Eriksson is also working at a youth center that focuses on keeping young people away from drugs and crime and more involved with music. In 2009, a video was posted of him playing a drum solo on a drum set made of ice at the Icehotel in Jukkasjärvi. This video has accumulated over 13.6 million views as of 2022. Later that year Eriksson performed with the reunited Swedish punk band Strindbergs.

== Kit setup ==
Eriksson owns and uses a number of different drum kits, however his main kit consists of Ludwig with Sabian cymbals.

Drums

- 22" Bass drum
- 18" Floor tom
- 16" Floor tom
- 13” Rack tom
- 14" Snare drum

Cymbals

- 14" Hi-hat
- 18" Crash
- 18" Crash
- 22" Jazz Ride

== Selected discography ==
- 1996 The Hellacopters - Supershitty to the Max! (Drums, vocals)
- 1997 The Hellacopters - Payin' the Dues (Drums, backing vocals)
- 1999 The Hellacopters - Grande Rock (Drums, backing vocals)
- 2000 The Hellacopters - High Visibility (Drums, backing vocals)
- 2002 The Hellacopters - By the Grace of God (Drums)
- 2003 Wayne Kramer - Adult World (Drums)
- 2004 Urrke T & Midlife Crisis - Ask Not What You Can Do For Your Country... (Drums)
- 2004 Stefan Sundström - Hjärtats Melodi (Drums)
- 2005 The Hellacopters - Rock & Roll Is Dead (Drums, backing vocals)
- 2008 The Hellacopters - Head Off (Drums, backing vocals)
- 2010 Tramp - Indigo (Drums)
- TBA The Hellacopters - Upcoming live album (Drums, backing vocals)
