= Goodnight Cleveland =

- Directed by: Jim Heneghan
- Starring: The Hellacopters
- Music by: The Hellacopters
- Countries of origin: United States; Sweden
- Original languages: English; Swedish

Production
- Producer: Urban Eriksson
- Cinematography: Jim Heneghan
- Editor: Jim Heneghan
- Running time: 48 minutes

Original release
- Release: November 29, 2002

Goodnight Cleveland is a documentary film directed by Jim Heneghan for 8th Grade Films chronicling The Hellacopters' North American tour in 2002 in support of their album High Visibility.

== Background ==
The film was shot with one camera and a sound person using the techniques of Direct Cinema and Cinéma vérité. Goodnight Cleveland is noted for its lack of dramatic arc which captures the boredom and tedium of touring life in a very realistic way.

The title Goodnight Cleveland is heard in the film when Hellacopters lead singer Nicke Andersson yells "goodnight Cleveland" to the audience at the end of the Agora Ballroom show, an inverted reference to the mockumentary film This Is Spınal Tap, in which bass player Derek Smalls yells, "Hello Cleveland" to an unseen audience as the band attempts to find their way to the stage, while lost in the boiler room of the theater before a concert.

== DVD release ==
The DVD was only released as DVD region 1 and the main feature runs 48 minutes and comes with four audio tracks (vintage mono mix, band commentary, stereo and Alternative Spaghetti Western Soundtrack). The DVD also includes "over an hour of never-before-seen outtakes". The DVD was sourced from an analog transfer.
