= Where the Action Is Tour =

Where the Action Is
- Genre: Rock, pop, power pop, alternative rock, indie rock, stoner rock, blues rock, punk rock, garage punk, skate punk, progg
- Dates: June - July
- Locations: Sweden touring (2004 to 2006); Stockholm, Sweden (2008 to present)
- Years active: 2004 to 2006; 2008 to present
- Founders: Luger; Live Nation
- Website: Official Website

Where the Action Is (WTAI) was a tour featuring Swedish rock bands that toured throughout Sweden between 2004 and 2006 with several high profiled Swedish bands and artists such as The Hellacopters, The Hives, The Ark, Moneybrother and many others. In 2007 the tour took a hiatus and then came back in 2008 as a one-day festival in Stora Skuggan, Stockholm. The name is taken from a song from The Hellacopters second album Payin' the Dues.

== Tour dates and lineups ==
=== 2004 tour ===
Played in Gothenburg (8/21) and Stockholm (8/25).

- The Soundtrack of Our Lives
- The Hives
- Broder Daniel
- Sahara Hotnights
- Teddybears STHLM
- Nickokick

=== 2005 tour ===
Played in Gothenburg (8/3), Malmö (8/5), Linköping (8/12), Karlskrona (8/13) and Stockholm (8/27).

- The Hellacopters
- Moneybrother
- The Ark
- Håkan Hellström
- Alf
- Marvel
- The Bones

=== 2006 tour ===
Played in Strömstad (7/27), Linköping (7/28), Örebro (7/30), Malmö (8/3), Gothenburg (8/5), Söderbärke(8/8) and Stockholm (8/9).

Asta Kask only played in Stockholm, C.AARMÉ only played in Gothenburg, The Hives only played in Stockholm and Söderbärke and The Soundtrack of Our Lives played Strömstad, Huskvarna, Linköping and Örebro.

- The Hives
- The Hellacopters
- Millencollin
- The Soundtrack of Our Lives
- Asta Kask
- Backyard Babies
- C.AARMÉ

=== 2008 festival ===
Returned as a one-day festival in Stockholm (7/14) after a one-year hiatus.

- Foo Fighters
- Queens of the Stone Age
- The Hives
- The Hellacopters
- Mando Diao
- Sahara Hotnights
- Dirty Pretty Things
- Rival Schools
- Molotov Jive
- Dinosaur Jr.
- Johnossi

=== 2009 festival ===
Scheduled for 7/12 - 7/13, WTAI will again be at Stora Skuggan

- Neil Young
- Nick Cave and the Bad Seeds
- Pixies
- The Pretenders
- Fever Ray
- Duffy
- Seasick Steve
- Jenny Wilson
- Markus Krunegård
