= The Bitter Twins =

Swedish rock band

- Origin: Sweden
- Genres: Rock, new wave music, punk-pop, alternative rock
- Years active: 2005 - present
- Labels: Wild Kingdom, Sound Pollution
- Members: Sören 'Sulo' Karlsson; Anders 'Boba' Lindström

The Bitter Twins is a Swedish rock band composed of Sören 'Sulo' Karlsson and Anders 'Boba' Lindström, the duo released their debut album Global Panic! in 2009.

== History ==
Karlsson and Lindström had been long time friends and collaborators before forming The Bitter Twins, they both formed The Diamond Dogs during the early 1990s with Karlsson on vocals and Lindström on guitar, however Lindström left the band in 1996 to join The Hellacopters. Karlsson has since continued to play with The Diamond Dogs as well as release several solo albums. However Lindström would team up with the band again to record Black River Road in 2004. In 2005 the duo formed The Bitter Twins and the Last of the Lovers with plans to release an album to record an album following year as a 20th anniversary of the two playing together, however the name was soon shortened to The Bitter Twins. The duo first intended to play the depressed type of music they played when they first met but ended up written music more similar to that of their favorite band The Clash circa 1978 to 1982 and with a lot of influences from ska, reggae and funk During the recording sessions Papa Dee, Mattias Bärjed, Brian Robertson, Nicke Andersson and several other friends and collaborators made guest appearances. The band's debut album Global Panic! containing ten songs was released April 24 and received mixed reviews. The entire album and a bonus track is also available on the band official MySpace account. The band has set out to play a number of shows throughout Sweden in support of the album.

== Band members ==
Fixed members

- Sören Karlsson - vocals
- Anders Lindström - keyboards, organ, guitar

Other contributors

- Papa Dee - toasting
- Nicke Andersson - lead guitar, vocals
- Brian Robertson - lead guitar
- Stefan Björk - bass
- Robert Eriksson - drums
- Magnus Carlson - backing vocals
- Ola Nyström - slide guitar
- Magic - horns
- Henrik Widén moog
- Anders Härnestam - drums
- Micke Borg - guitar

== Discography ==
- Global Panic! (2009)
