= By the Grace of God (album) =

Studio album by The Hellacopters
- Released: 18 September 2002
- Recorded: Polar Studios and Romarö Studio (Stockholm)
- Genre: Rock, hard rock, garage rock
- Length: 41:24
- Label: Universal/Liquor and Poker Music
- Producer: Chips K.

The Hellacopters chronology
Cream of the Crap Vol. 1 (2002)	By the Grace of God (2002)	Cream of the Crap Vol. 2 (2004)

Professional ratings
Review scores
Source	Rating
AllMusic	4/5 stars

By the Grace of God is the fifth album released by the Swedish rock band The Hellacopters. The CD version of the album came in three different combinations of the red, white and black cloud and lightning design. The design would become a trademark for the band and was used on backdrops, merchandise, different record covers and in music videos. The LP version released in Sweden had a black cover and vinyl while the European version had a white cover and vinyl. Limited edition versions of the album in Japan and America also featured "Red Lights" and the Rory Gallagher song "Big Gun" as bonus tracks. Another special American version also featured an embossed logo, a fold-up digi pack and a patch.

== Track listing ==
All tracks are written by Nicke Andersson, except where noted.

No.	Title	Writer(s)	Length
1.	"By the Grace of God"	Andersson, Håkansson	3:04
2.	"All New Low"		3:27
3.	"Down on Freestreet"		2:41
4.	"Better Than You"		2:45
5.	"Carry Me Home"		3:43
6.	"Rainy Days Revisited"		3:41
7.	"It's Good But It Just Ain't Right"		2:55
8.	"U.Y.F.S."	Bjäred, Lindström	3:58
9.	"On Time"		3:10
10.	"All I've Got"	Håkansson, Dahlqvist	2:44
11.	"Go Easy Now"		2:54
12.	"The Exorcist"		2:38
13.	"Pride"		3:33
Total length:			41:24

== Personnel ==
The Hellacopters

- Nicke Andersson – vocals guitars, piano, percussion
- Robert Dahlqvist – guitars, vocals
- Kenny Håkansson – bass guitar
- Anders Lindström – organ, piano, guitar, backing vocals
- Robert Eriksson – drums, backing vocals

Additional musicians

- Chuck Ponder – backing vocals
- Lars-Göran Petrov – backing vocals
- Martin Hederos – piano
- Mattias Bärjed – guitar
- Jörgen Wall – Timpani

Production

- Chips Kiesbye – producer
- Michael Ibert – engineer
- George Marino – mastering

== Charts ==
=== Weekly charts ===
Chart (2002)	Peak position
Finnish Albums (Suomen virallinen lista)	8
Norwegian Albums (VG-lista)	13
Swedish Albums (Sverigetopplistan)	2

=== Year-end charts ===
Chart (2002)	Position
Swedish Albums (Sverigetopplistan)	91
