= Anders Lindström =

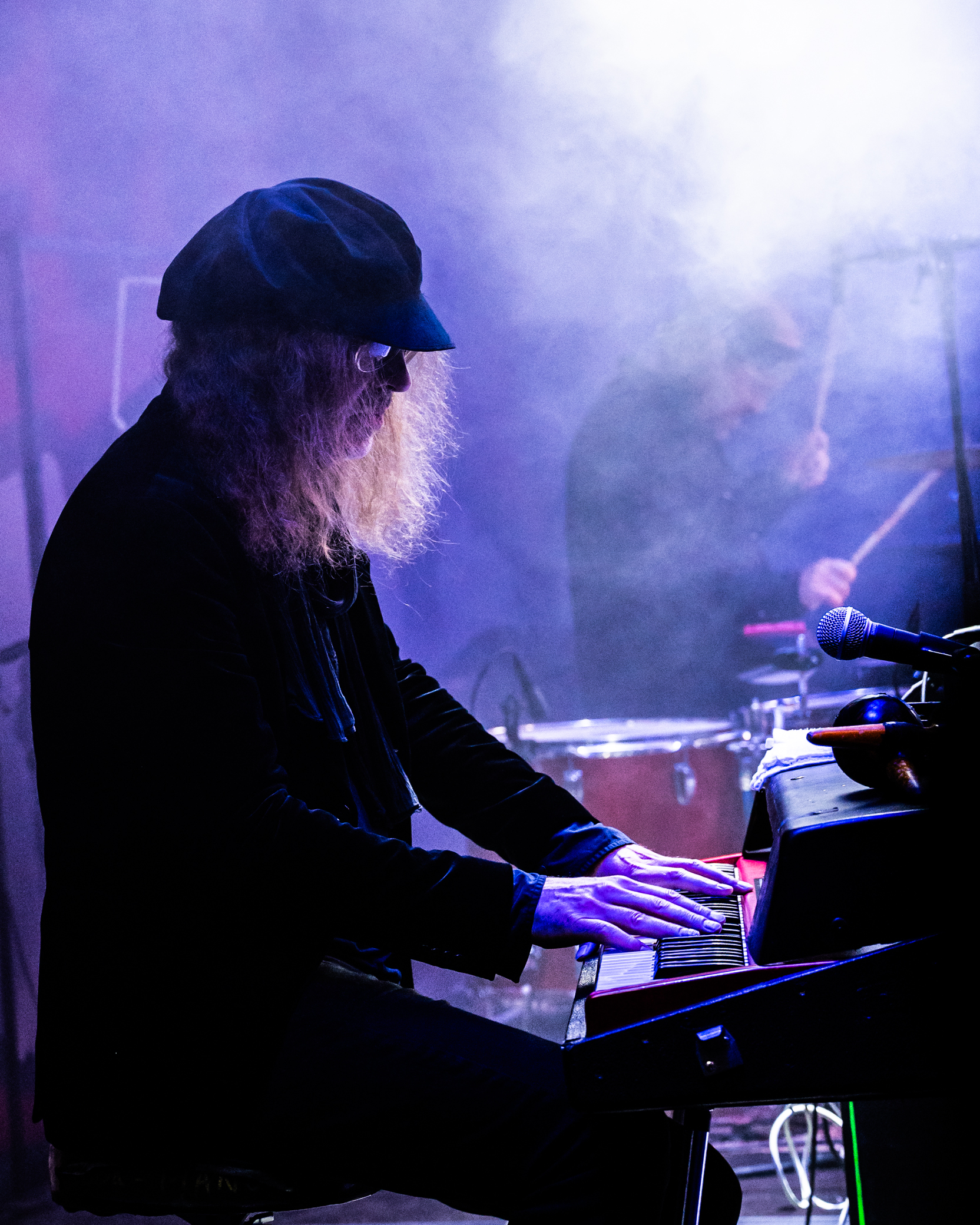
- Lindström with The Hellacopters in 2024

Background information
- Also known as: Boba, Boba Fett, Bobba Lee Fett, Bobby Lee Fett, Mr Fett, Andrew Shit
- Born: Anders Carl Lindström; 19 July 1969 (age 56)
- Genres: Garage rock, garage punk, power pop, hard rock, garage rock revival, alternative rock
- Occupations: Musician, songwriter, recording engineer
- Instruments: Keyboards, percussion, guitar, vocals
- Years active: 1987 - present
- Labels: Psychout Records, White Jazz Records, Lookout! Records, Sub Pop Records, Mans Ruin Records, Bang!

Anders Carl Lindström, or Boba Fett, as he is often called (born 19 July 1969), is a Swedish rock musician most known for being the organist and pianist of the Swedish rock band The Hellacopters and co-founder and guitarist of The Diamond Dogs.

== Life and career ==
Lindström founded The Diamond Dogs along with vocalist Sören 'Sulo' Karlsson in the early 1990s; Lindström was the band's guitarist and released four albums with the band. During this time he also worked as a recording engineer for various bands including some early Hellacopters recordings. Lindström later joined The Hellacopters after the band's grammis award-winning debut album Supershitty to the Max! to play the organ and piano. After the departure of guitarist Dregen, vocalist and guitarist Nick Royale handled lead guitar while Lindström temporarily played rhythm guitar during the recording of Grande Rock before Robert Dahlqvist joined as their full-time guitarist. During the band's hiatus after the release of the album By the Grace of God, Lindström rejoined his old band Diamond Dogs to record Black River Road in 2004.

In 2005, The Hellacopters returned with Rock & Roll Is Dead which would become their last full-length album of their own material. Lindström also formed The Bitter Twins along with former bandmate Sulo to celebrate their 20th anniversary of playing music together. The initial idea was to play the depressive type of music they originally played 20 years ago, but the music sounded more like The Clash in the late 70s and early 80s. The duo also called in guest musicians such as Papa Dee, Magnus Carlson from the Weeping Willows, Mattias Bärjed from The Soundtrack of Our Lives and Stefan Björk formerly of Wilmer X. In late 2007, The Hellacopters announced that they would be breaking up after the release of their cover album Head Off and the following "Tour Before the Fall", which ended with four gigs in two days in late October 2008. After The Hellacopters' break-up Lindström worked with front man Nicke Andersson's new band Imperial State Electric.

Lindström is also a recreational fisher and together with bands such as The Hives, Backyard Babies, Millencolin, Weeping Willows, Randy he and The Hellacopters contributed with music for the charity album Ge Fan i Våra Vatten to raise money to help save the northern pike and the Atlantic salmon. Recently Lindström worked with Weeping Willows front man Magnus Carlson on soundtracks for several Swedish film projects that have not yet been released.

== Selected discography ==
- 1993 Blue Eyes Shouldn't be Cryin - The Diamond Dogs (guitar)
- 1994 Honked - The Diamond Dogs (guitar)
- 1995 Good Time Girl - The Diamond Dogs (guitar)
- 1996 Supershitty to the Max! - The Hellacopters (lead guitar)
- 1996 Smock'n Roll - Svart Snö
- 1996 Hour of the Gate - Bloodstone (producer)
- 1996 Need of Ammunition - The Diamond Dogs (guitar)
- 1997 Necrophobic - Darkside (engineer)
- 1997 Payin' the Dues - The Hellacopters (guitar)
- 1997 Vibrion - Closed Frontiers (engineer)
- 1997 Knockouts! - Backyard Babies (producer)
- 1997 Ridin' The Tiger - Gluecifer (recording engineer)
- 1999 Grande Rock - The Hellacopters (guitar, keyboards, organ)
- 2000 High Visibility - The Hellacopters (keyboards, organ)
- 2002 By the Grace of God - The Hellacopters (keyboards, organ)
- 2003 Adult World - Wayne Kramer (keyboards)
- 2004 Black River Road - The Diamond Dogs (organ, keyboards, guitar)
- 2005 Rock & Roll Is Dead - The Hellacopters (organ, keyboards)
- 2008 Head Off - The Hellacopters (keyboards, organ)
- 2008 Communion - The Soundtrack of Our Lives (songwriting)
- 2009 Global Panic - The Bitter Twins (guitar, organ, backing vocals)
- 2010 Imperial State Electric - Imperial State Electric (guitar, keyboards)
- 2010 The Gloria Story - Ohno (production)
- 2010 En plats i solen - Kent (backing vocals)
- 2010 Death Metal - Dismember (drum recording)
- (TBA) Upcoming live album - The Hellacopters (keyboards, organ, percussion)
