= Head Off =

Studio album of cover songs by The Hellacopters
- Released: 18 April 2008
- Recorded: 2007
- Genre: Garage rock
- Label: Wild Kingdom; Backstage Alliance; Toy's Factory; Sound Pollution
- Producer: Chips K.

The Hellacopters chronology
| Air Raid Serenades (2006) | Head Off (2008) | Eyes of Oblivion (2022) |

Professional ratings
Review scores
| Source | Rating |
|---|---|
| AllMusic | 2/5 stars |

Head Off is the seventh album released by the Swedish rock band The Hellacopters. The album consists of cover songs from acts that the band felt that everyone should know about and listen to. The 2,500 units of the vinyl release all come with a poster, an additional 1,500 units were later pressed which also contained the poster. A special CD box was also available in a limited run of 6,000 copies worldwide and consists of a special CD that contains all of the music on one side that can be played as a regular CD, on the other side the bonus track "Straight Until Morning" and a special pin and patch.

== Track listing ==
| No. | Title | Writer(s) | Original artist | Length |
|---|---|---|---|---|
| 1. | "Electrocute" | Carlsson | Demons | 2:43 |
| 2. | "Midnight Angels" | Fransson, Sandstrom, Wind, Wolfbrandt, Hageras | The Peepshows | 2:48 |
| 3. | "(I'm) Watching You" | Burks, Cartwright, Drake, Fieldhouse, Silveroli | The Humpers | 2:13 |
| 4. | "No Salvation" | Andersson, Karlsson, Bjornlund | The Turpentines | 3:56 |
| 5. | "In the Sign of the Octopus" | Ahlgren, Hallgren, Klemensberger, Wawrzeniuk | The Robots | 3:05 |
| 6. | "Veronica Lake" | Davidson, Reber, Weber, Randt | New Bomb Turks | 2:41 |
| 7. | "Another Turn" | Guttormsson | The Maharajas | 1:59 |
| 8. | "I Just Don't Know About Girls" | Spittles | Asteroid B-612 | 3:28 |
| 9. | "Rescue" | Cole | Dead Moon | 3:51 |
| 10. | "Making Up for Lost Time" | Fate | The Bellrays | 2:33 |
| 11. | "Throttle Bottom" | Sims, Rick | Gaza Strippers | 2:39 |
| 12. | "Darling Darling" | Varmby, Drackes | The Royal Cream | 3:58 |

== Personnel ==
The Hellacopters

- Nicke Andersson – Lead vocals, guitars, percussion
- Robert Dahlqvist – Guitars, backing vocals
- Kenny Håkansson – Bass guitar, backing vocals
- Anders Lindström – Organ, piano, backing vocals
- Robert Eriksson – Drums, backing vocals

Production

- Chips Kiesbye – Producer, engineer
- Henrik Lipp – Engineer
- Stefan Boman – Mixing
