= Cream of the Crap! Vol. 1 =

Compilation album by The Hellacopters
- Released: 23 January 2002
- Genre: Garage rock, punk rock, garage punk
- Length: 60:00
- Label: Universal, Polar, Psychout Records

The Hellacopters chronology
High Visibility (2000)	Cream of the Crap! Vol. 1 (2002)	By the Grace of God (2002)

Cream of the Crap! Vol. 1 is the first of two compilation albums by Swedish rock band The Hellacopters, released in 2002 and comprising rare singles, B-sides, EP selections and other non-album tracks. Cream of the Crap! Vol. 2 was released two years later. It was rated 2.5 stars by AllMusic.

== Track listing ==
1. "Thanks for Nothing" (Nicke Andersson) - 2:45
  - B-side of the single "Down Right Blue"
2. "Crimson Ballroom" (Andersson) - 4:05
  - Released with punk/car magazine Gearhead Magazine #10
3. "Makes It Alright" (Andersson) - 2:18
  - Released with "Move Right Out of Here" 7' and 10' vinyl single
4. "Television Addict" (The Victims) - 3:00
  - The Victims cover, B-side of the single "Riot on the Rocks"
5. "Killing Allan" (The Hellacopters) - 3:48
  - Previously a limited-edition single
6. "Misanthropic High" (The Hellacopters) - 3:14
  - Previously a limited-edition single in three different colors
7. "Rock Hammer" (The Hellacopters) - 4:16
  - B-side of the single "Looking at Me"
8. "1995" (The Hellacopters) - 3:23
  - Previously a limited-edition single in different colors
9. "Gimme Shelter" (Mick Jagger, Keith Richards) - 4:21
  - The Rolling Stones cover, B-side of the single "Like No Other Man"
10. "Heart of the Matter" (Andersson, Kenny Håkansson) - 3:23
  - Released with "Move Right Out of Here" 7' and 10' vinyl single
11. "Tilt City" (The Hellacopters) - 1:51
  - B-side of the single "1995"
12. "Down Right Blue" (Andersson) - 4:33
  - Previously a limited-edition vinyl single
13. "I Got a Right" (Iggy Pop, James Williamson) - 3:50
  - The Stooges cover, B-side of the single "Misanthropic High"
14. "Ferrytale" (The Hellacopters) - 3:33
  - From the EP Disappointment Blues
15. "Freespeedin" (The Hellacopters) - 2:59
  - B-side of the single "1995"
16. "I Want a Lip" (Tempio) - 2:54
  - April Stevens cover, previously a limited-edition single in four different colors
17. "The Creeps" (Mike Ness) - 2:14
  - Social Distortion cover, B-side of the single "Killing Allan"
18. "Lowered Pentangles (Anything at All)" (Andersson) - 3:22
  - From the New Bomb Turks/The Hellacopters split single
