= Supershitty to the Max! =

Studio album by The Hellacopters
- Released: 1 June 1996
- Recorded: February 1996
- Genre: Garage rock, punk rock, garage punk
- Length: 57:11
- Label: White Jazz; Toys Factory; Man's Ruin
- Producer: Tomas Skogsberg

The Hellacopters chronology
Supershitty to the Max! (1996)	Payin' the Dues (1997)

Alternative cover
- Man's Ruin edition cover

Professional ratings
Review scores
Source	Rating
AllMusic	4/5 stars

Supershitty to the Max! is the debut album by the Swedish rock band The Hellacopters. It was recorded in just 26 hours during February 1996 at Sunlight Studios in Stockholm and released in June that year.

The album was initially released on 500 units of clear vinyl, followed two weeks later by a CD version. A second vinyl release was available in 1997 with 1,500 units in white vinyl, whilst Toys Factory also released the album in Japan with a cover version of the Misfits song "Bullet" as a bonus track.

== Track listing ==
All tracks written by The Hellacopters.

No.	Title	Length
1.	"(Gotta Get Some Action) NOW!"	3:16
2.	"24h Hell"	1:33
3.	"Fire, Fire, Fire"	1:31
4.	"Born Broke"	4:13
5.	"Bore Me"	3:18
6.	"Tab"	5:34
7.	"How Could I Care"	3:52
8.	"Didn't Stop Us"	1:46
9.	"Random Riot"	1:44
10.	"Fake Baby"	2:59
11.	"Ain't No Time"	2:56
12.	"Such a Blast"	2:13
13.	"Spock in My Rocket"	22:16
Total length:		57:11

- On the vinyl version, a bonus track "It's Too Late" as track 6.

== Personnel ==
The Hellacopters

- Nicke Hellacopter – lead vocals, guitar, maracas
- Åsk-Dregen – guitar, backing vocals, tambourine, lead vocals on "Didn't Stop Us"
- Kenny Hellacopter – bass, backing vocals
- Robert Hellacopter – drums, backing vocals, maracas, lead vocals on "Such a Blast"

Additional

- Boba Fett – piano
- Hans Östlund – lead guitar on "Ain't No Time"
- Nick Vahlberg – vocals on "How Could I Care"
