= Jaqee =

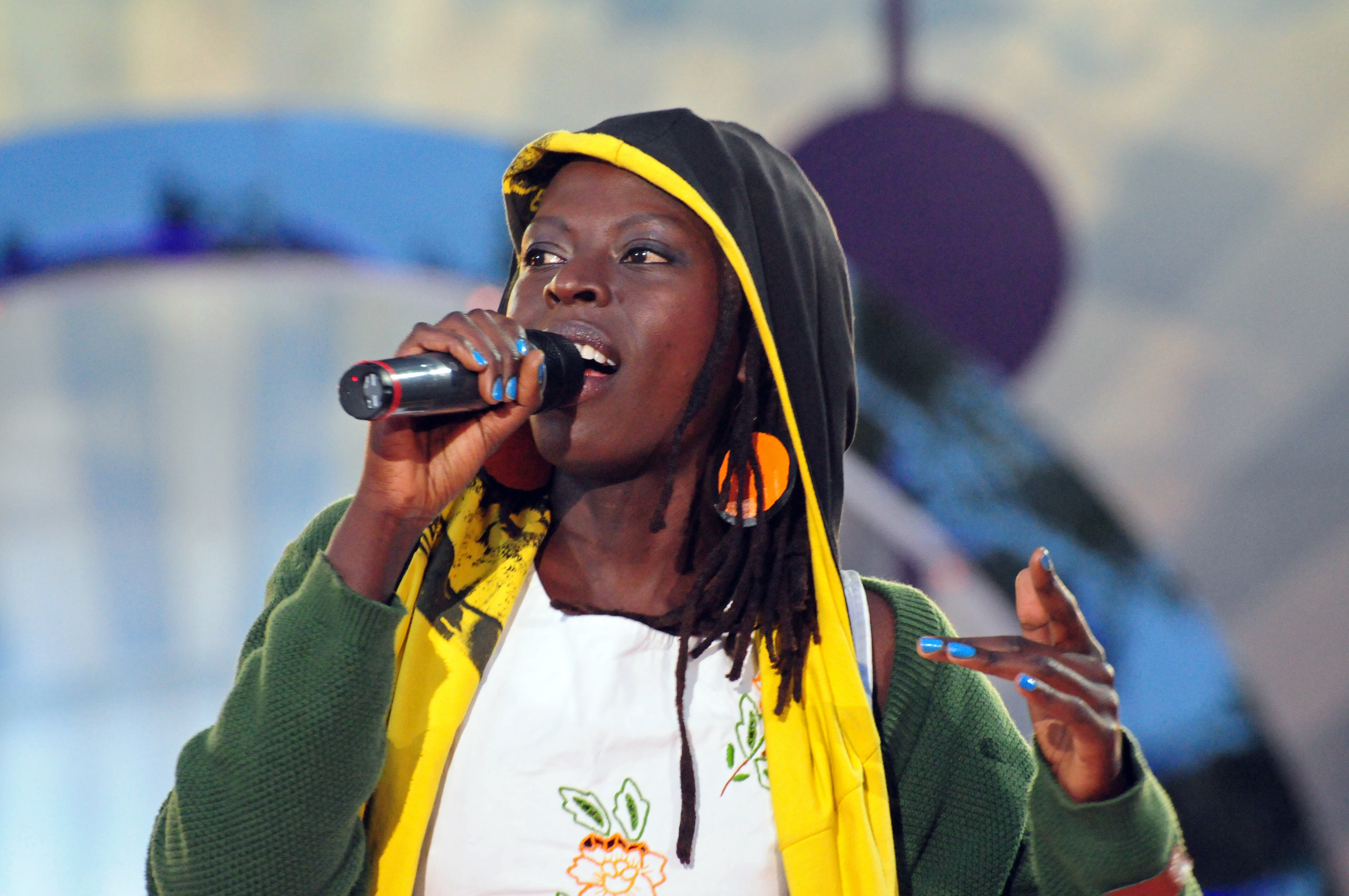
- Jaqee in 2009

Background information
- Born: Jaqueline Nakiri Nalubale; 1977 (age 47–48); Kampala, Uganda
- Origin: Gothenburg, Sweden
- Genres: Reggae, jazz, soul music
- Occupation: Singer
- Years active: 2005–present
- Labels: Makasound
- Website: www.jaqee.com

Jaqueline Nakiri Nalubale (born 1977), also known as Jaqee, is a musician born in Kampala, Uganda. In 1990, she immigrated to Sweden, where she began her musical career. She describes herself as a "musical chameleon", having no single musical style.

Jaqee speaks Luganda, Nkore, English, and Swedish, as well as "a little bit" of Spanish; she is learning German.

== Albums ==
In May 2005, she released her self-financed debut album Blaqalixious, which won the best Soul/Hip-Hop prize at ManifestGalan 2006 and included songs like "The Way You Make Me Feel", "Karma", and "Headfall". The album was nominated for a Grammis Award. The nomination surprised her, since the album was self-released; she had approached several record companies before recording the album, but none signed her. She says the album was inspired by "life, love, war, injustice and prejudice." "[It] was my direct contact to the music that a rural community in the diaspora plays", she said of the album. She has a tattoo of the album's name, which she says was a knockoff of Beyoncé's expression "bootilicious".

Jaqee's follow up album, Nouvelle d'amour, was released in October 2007. The album showed blues and rock influences. It included the songs "Sugar" and "Castara Blues". It was also nominated for a Grammis Award.

Her next release, in 2008, was not a solo project but a jazz tribute album to Billie Holiday entitled A Letter to Billie. It was presented together with one of Sweden's most active big bands, Bohuslän Big Band. She went on tour with the band to Japan and Egypt.

Jaqee's most recent album is Kokoo Girl, a return to roots reggae and ska. Released in June 2009, Kokoo Girl saw her joining forces with German-based Rootdown Records, who released "Kokoo Girl", "Take It Or Leave It", and "Land of the Free". As word spread, French record label Makasound added her to their artist roster, re-releasing her record in France as Land of the Free on International Women's Day, 8 March 2010. The French release was voted 2010 Reggae Album of the Year by iTunes France. "I grew up with African Gospel, in a sad and turbulent environment, so for me, this means I grasp and totally understand reggae and its never-ending struggle for the common man," Jaqee said.
