= Adam West (band) =

American hard rock/psychedelic rock band

- Origin: Washington D.C., USA
- Genres: Hard rock, punk
- Years active: 1991 – 2008
- Labels: Fandango Records (USA); People Like You Records (Europe)
- Past members: Jake Starr; Steve (Fisher); Jim Sciubba; Mario Trubiano; Dan-o Deckleman; Ben Brower; Steve Baise; Tom Barrick; Kevin Hoffman; Johnny May; Derrick Baranowsky; James Marlowe; Johnny Epiphone; Bill Crandall; Ray Wiley; Andy Rapoport; Phil Munds
- Website: http://fandangorecs.com/adamwest

Adam West was a Washington D.C.–based hard rock/psychedelic rock band, active from 1991 to 2008.

== History ==
The band, named after the actor, was formed in 1991 and was initially influenced by the proto-punk sounds of the Stooges and the Misfits. The initial lineup included Jake Starr (vocals), Bill Crandall and Ray Wiley (guitar), Phil Munds (bass), and Tom Barrick (drums). The band released its debut single "I Get a Sensation" on Fandango Records in 1993. There were many personnel changes in the band's early years, and Starr and Barrick were the only remaining original members by the time of their first full-length album. Mondo Royale, in 1997.

Over their career, the band released 35 non-album singles, six full-length studio albums, and three compilation albums, and made more than 40 appearances on various-artist compilations. They were nominated for several Washington Area Music Awards in the Hard Rock categories and won five times. Their later albums veered toward irreverent "snotty" humor, and their late-period sound was often compared to that of Swedish roots-rock band the Hellacopters, with whom they had toured. The final Adam West album, ESP: Extra Sexual Perception, was released in 2008 and featured the lineup of Starr, bassist Steve (Fisher), drummer Jim Sciubba, and guitarist Mario Trubiano.

They played their final concert in November 2008. A compilation album collecting many of their early one-off singles, Five the Hard Way, was released in 2011. Starr later led the garage rock band Jake Starr and the Delicious Fullness.
