= Payin' the Dues =

1997 studio album by the Hellacopters

Studio album by The Hellacopters
- Released: 1 October 1997
- Recorded: February 1997
- Studios: Sunlight Studios, Stockholm
- Length: 28:51
- Label: White Jazz
- Producers: The Hellacopters, Andrew Shit and Tomas Skogsberg

The Hellacopters chronology
Supershitty to the Max! (1996)	Payin' the Dues (1997)	Grande Rock (1999)

Payin' the Dues is the second album released by the Swedish rock band The Hellacopters and their last studio album to feature original guitarist Dregen before his departure from the band to focus full-time on his other band Backyard Babies. The album was released simultaneously on both CD and on vinyl; however, "City Slang" was only available on the vinyl edition. The initial pressings were in 2000 units of clear smoke and 2,500 units in purple vinyl. Two additional pressings were later available in two different versions of black vinyl. The Toy's Factory release also featured the bonus track "Oh Yeah Alright".

== Release and reception ==
Professional ratings
Review scores
Source	Rating
AllMusic	4.5/5 stars
Pitchfork	6.0/10
PopMatters	8/10 stars

Prior to the release of Payin' the Dues, The Hellacopters hosted a release party for the album on 21 September 1997. The album was released on 1 October 1997, on White Jazz Records where it was released on vinyl and compact disc. The first vinyl released was limited to 2000 copies on clear smokey vinyl while the second was limited to 2500 on purple vinyl. The album was released to positive reviews from critics. The band toured Scandinavia in support of the album with shows in Sweden, Denmark and Norway, and Turpentines as opening act.

Sub Pop re-released the album in the United States on 19 October 1999, with an additional disc of bonus live tracks, while the vinyl release included the additional track "City Slang". The live tracks were recorded at The Starfish Room in Vancouver on 28 May 1999, and featured Scott Morgan as a special guest.

== Track listing ==
All tracks are written by The Hellacopters.

No.	Title	Length
1.	"You Are Nothin'"	2:38
2.	"Like No Other Man"	3:14
3.	"Looking at Me"	2:04
4.	"Riot on the Rocks"	1:23
5.	"Hey!"	3:20
6.	"Soulseller"	3:12
7.	"Where the Action Is"	2:40
8.	"Twist Action"	2:03
9.	"Colapso Nervioso"	4:03
10.	"Psyched Out and Furious"	4:14
Total length:		28:51

Vinyl edition
No.	Title	Length
1.	"You Are Nothin'"	2:38
2.	"Like No Other Man"	3:14
3.	"Looking at Me"	2:04
4.	"Riot on the Rocks"	1:23
5.	"Hey!"	3:20
6.	"City Slang" (Sonic's Rendezvous Band cover)	5:54
7.	"Soulseller"	3:12
8.	"Where the Action Is"	2:40
9.	"Twist Action"	2:03
10.	"Colapso Nervioso"	4:03
11.	"Psyched Out and Furious"	4:14
Total length:		34:45

Reissue bonus disc
No.	Title	Length
1.	"Action the Grace" (live)	2:12
2.	"You Are Nothin' (live)" (live)	2:27
3.	"Disappointment Blues" (live)	4:29
4.	"Born Broke" (live)	8:47
5.	"Alright Already Now" (live)	3:18
6.	"Downright Blue" (live)	4:45
7.	"City Slang" (Sonic's Rendezvous Band live cover)	0:43
8.	"(Gotta Get Some Action) Now! (live) / Soulseller" (live)	8:53

== Personnel ==
The Hellacopters

- Nicke Hellacopter – lead vocals, rhythm guitar, lead guitar, piano, percussion
- Dregen Hellacopter – rhythm guitar, lead guitar, backing vocals, percussion
- Boba Fett – piano
- Kenny Hellacopter – bass guitar
- Robert Hellacopter – drums, cymbal, percussion
