= High Visibility =

Studio album by The Hellacopters
- Released: 16 October 2000 (20 April 2002 in North America)
- Recorded: Polar Studios, Stockholm
- Genre: Rock, garage rock
- Length: 40:22
- Label: Polar, Universal Music Group, Led Recordings, Sweet Nothing Records, Gearhead Records
- Producer: Chips Kiesbye

The Hellacopters chronology
Grande Rock (1999)	High Visibility (2000)	Cream of the Crap Vol. 1 (2002)

Professional ratings
Review scores
Source	Rating
Allmusic	4/5 stars

High Visibilityis the fourth album released by the Swedish rock band The Hellacopters and the first studio album to feature new guitarist Robert Dahlqvist. The album was released on both CD and vinyl. The first vinyl release featured the music on three sides and an etching of the band's logo on the fourth, the second was a 2×180g issue but without the etching. Both versions also contained the bonus track "No Dogs". There was also a limited edition from Gearhead Records on red vinyl without the bonus track. The Japanese version of the CD also features "A Cross for Cain" as a bonus track.

== Track listing ==
No.	Title	Writer(s)	Length
1.	"Hopeless Case of a Kid in Denial"	Andersson	3:03
2.	"Baby Borderline"	Andersson	2:49
3.	"Sometimes I Don't Know"	Andersson	2:26
4.	"Toys and Flavors"	Kiesbye, Andersson	3:32
5.	"You're Too Good (To Me Baby)"	Hargreaves, Kaplan, Love	2:27
6.	"Throw Away Heroes"	Andersson	3:18
7.	"No Song Unheard"	Andersson	4:00
8.	"Truckloads of Nothin'"	Andersson, Kiesbye	2:48
9.	"A Heart Without Home"	Håkansson, Andersson	3:50
10.	"No One's Gonna Do It for You"	Håkansson, Andersson	3:09
11.	"I Wanna Touch"	Andersson	2:31
12.	"Hurtin' Time"	Morgan, Andersson	2:28
13.	"Envious"	Andersson	4:01

== Personnel ==
The Hellacopters:

- Nicke Andersson – Vocals, guitars, clavinet, percussion
- Robert Dahlqvist – Guitars, vocals
- Kenny Håkansson – Bass guitar
- Anders Lindström – Organ, piano
- Robert Eriksson – Drums, backing vocals

Additional musicians:

- Scott Morgan – Vocals
- Biff Malibu – Vocals
- Mattias Bärjed – Guitars
- Fredrick Wennerlund – Percussion
- Karin Thyr – Backing vocals
- Charlotte Ollward – Backing vocals

Production:

- Chips Kiesbye – Producer
- Stefan Boman – Engineer
- George Marino – Mastering
