= The Hellacopters =

Swedish garage rock band

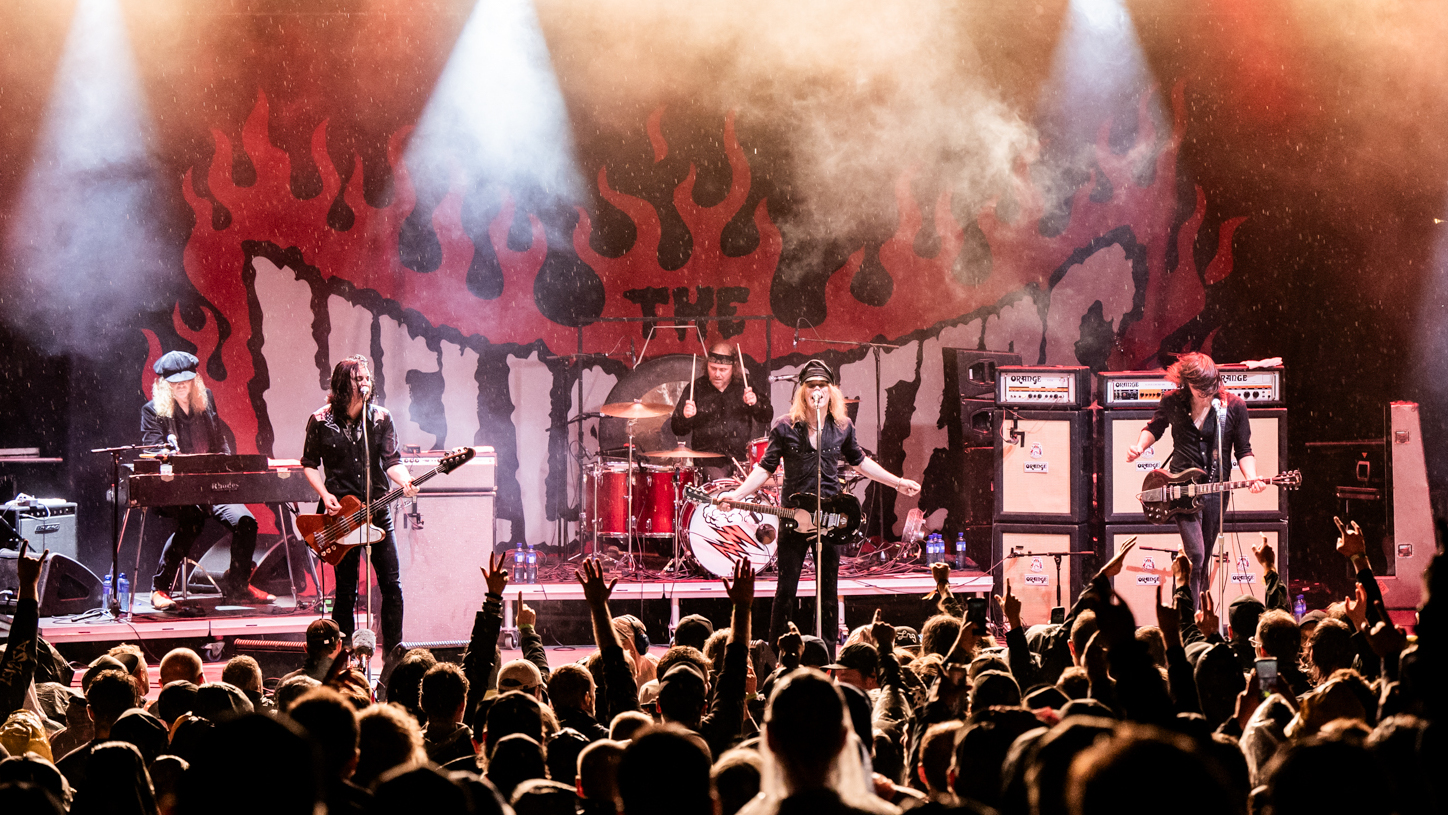
- The Hellacopters performing in 2024

Background information
- Also known as: The Copters
- Origin: Stockholm, Sweden
- Genres: Garage rock, garage punk, glam punk, hard rock
- Years active: 1994–2008, 2016–present
- Labels: Psychout, Man's Ruin, Sub Pop, Universal, Gearhead, Polar, Liquor and Poker, Nuclear Blast
- Members: Nicke Andersson; Robert Eriksson; Anders Lindström; Dolf De Borst
- Past members: Kenny Håkansson; Danne Andersson; Mattias Hellberg; Robert Dahlqvist; Sami Yaffa; Dregen
- Website: hellacopters.com

The Hellacopters are a Swedish garage rock band that was formed in 1994 by Nicke Andersson (vocals and guitar), Andreas Tyrone "Dregen" Svensson (guitar), Kenny Håkansson (bass) and Robert Eriksson (drums). Andersson (sometimes known as Nick Royale) had been the drummer for death metal band Entombed and Dregen was taking a break from his full-time band Backyard Babies. Dregen and Eriksson had been roadies for Entombed, while Håkansson was a childhood friend of Andersson's. The Hellacopters were initially conceived as a side project for Andersson and Dregen, but it eventually became the main songwriting and performance vehicle for Andersson. The band, together with The Hives, is considered one of the most important Swedish bands in the garage rock revival and one of the most influential rock bands in Sweden.

The band released their Swedish Grammi-winning debut album Supershitty to the Max! in 1996. Just before a tour opening for Kiss, the band recruited keyboardist and percussionist Anders Lindström (also known as Boba Fett or Boba) on a part-time basis; he would become a full-time member in 1999. After the album Payin' the Dues in 1998, Dregen left the band to return to Backyard Babies full-time, and Mattias Hellberg and Danne Andersson were recruited to complete the band touring responsibilities. After the release of Grande Rock, which featured additional guitar playing from both Lindström and Hellberg, Robert Dahlqvist was hired as a full-time lead guitarist in 1999. With the lineup now solidified, the band released three more studio albums and a cover album, with many EPs and limited edition releases as well. The Hellacopters disbanded amicably in 2008 so the members could move on to other projects. Eight years later, the band reassembled in 2016, initially for an exclusive performance at Sweden Rock Festival to celebrate the 20 year anniversary of their award-winning debut album Supershitty to the Max!.

In October 2021 the band announced that they had signed with the record label Nuclear Blast to release a new album in the spring of 2022. The album, Eyes of Oblivion, was released on 1 April 2022. The group's latest album, Overdriver, was released on January 31, 2025.

== Band history ==
=== Formation and Supershitty to the Max! ===
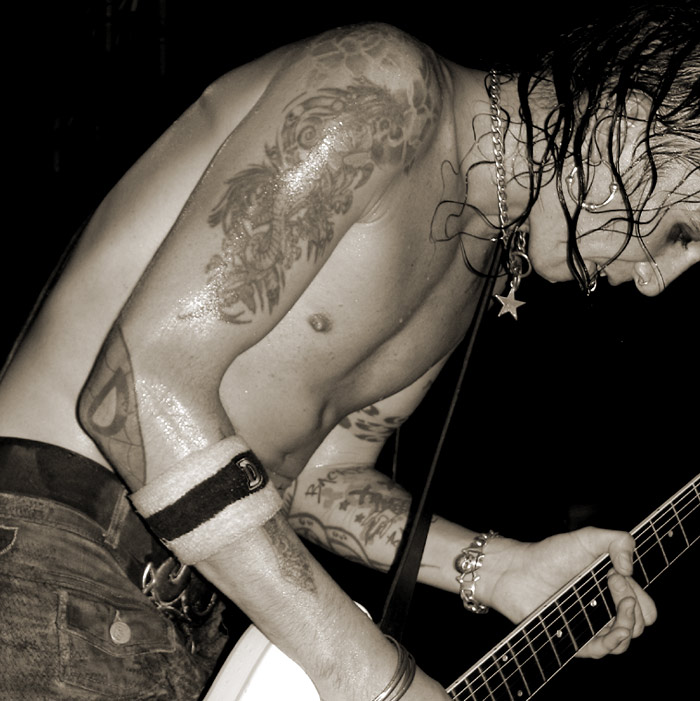
Original guitarist and founding member Dregen performing live

The band name was inspired by a magazine article discovered by Andersson and Dregen while on tour with Entombed in San Francisco. The article was about how the CIA was spying with helicopters on marijuana fields in Mexico and that the Mexicans called them "Hellacopters." The first Hellacopters rehearsal took place on 4 November 1994 as just a jam session, after two more rehearsals the band released their first single "Killing Allan" in January 1995 on their own label Psychout Records.

After releasing their second single "1995," the Hellacopters were signed by White Jazz Records and they released their debut album Supershitty to the Max! in June 1996. The album was recorded all live in only 26 hours. The band won a Swedish Grammy for the album. Anders "Boba Fett" Lindström, guitarist of the Swedish rock band The Diamond Dogs, was then recruited to play keyboards shortly before they supported Kiss on their Scandinavian dates in June 1997.

=== Payin' the Dues and Dregen's departure ===
The band recorded their follow-up album Payin' the Dues in February 1997. The record barely managed to break into the top 20 in Sweden and the top 30s in Finland. Andersson then left Entombed completely to concentrate full-time on the Hellacopters. A Swedish tour included a show at the second largest stage at the Hultsfred Festival, while the band famously played a secret gig backstage on a small makeshift stage. In 1998 the band toured Europe with Gluecifer, with whom they recorded the split album Respect the Rock. Soon after, Dregen left the band and returned to Backyard Babies.

Simply because it was too much hassle playing in two bands at the same time. Fame is not everything y´know... Our time will come. Backyard Babies has been around since 1989. I love bands doing it for life. I sure miss the Hellacopters guys a lot sometimes though..

— Dregen, on his departure from the Hellacopters.

With Dregen's departure in the middle of an extensive tour, the band recruited guitarists Chuck Pounder and Mattias Hellberg for their tours of Scandinavia and U.S./Canada, respectively. While on tour in America the band also had the opportunity to jam with legendary Detroit rockers Scott Morgan of the Sonic's Rendezvous Band and Wayne Kramer of the MC5, beginning long working relationships with both.

=== Grande Rock and Dahlqvist's debut ===
In September 1998 the band recorded their third album Grande Rock. Due to the absence of a second guitarist, Lindström and Hellberg both contributed on guitar. The album's 1970s classic rock sound was a departure from their previous albums, which featured a louder Detroit punk rock and garage rock sound. One reason for this was that the band recorded the album in an older studio from the 1970s in the Swedish woods, where they learned from an older and more experienced engineer who knew how to create the vintage seventies sound the band desired.

The recording of Grande Rock, it was so different [compared] to the other records we did, were we usually go into the studio record, go to a bar get drunk and then go to the studio next day. We actually went into the Swedish forest... There's this old hippie studio from the seventies up in the Swedish woods and there's this 50 year old guy that working there. He's been working with every sort of music from Swedish folk to Jimi Hendrix... So we figure well he was traveling with Swedish hippie bands in the seventies, he should have an idea how to create a genuine seventies rock sound. We took a few albums with us to the studio, showed the albums and he was all like, 'Yeah, I think this was the way they created the sound.' And not by the push of a button or a pedal or something, a box... The proper way of handcrafting, doing it probably the way they did do it back then...

— Kenny Håkansson, on the band's new sound.

Grande Rock became the band's first album to break into the Swedish top ten, before dropping out of the list after one week. For the ensuing tour, the band considered recruiting an American guitarist but hired Robert Dahlqvist. With Dahlqvist as a full-time replacement for Dregen the band set out on tour along with Wayne Kramer, The Nomads and Powder Monkeys.

=== High Visibility with Chips Kiesbye ===
In 2000 the band headed back into the studio to record their first album with Robert Dahlqvist who by then had earned the nickname "Strängen" or "Strings" due to all the strings he had broken during rehearsals. It was also their first time working with producer Chips Kiesbye, who had worked with artists such as Sahara Hotnights, Millencolin, Thåström, The Nomads, The Turpentines, his own band Sator, and many other Swedish rock bands. Kiesbye would become their producer of choice and he produced all of the band's subsequent studio albums. High Visibility spent twelve weeks on the Swedish charts and was certified gold in that nation. The band set out on a Scandinavian and European tour in support of the album along with the then-unknown band The Hives as their opening act. High Visibility was later released in the United States and the band's tour was chronicled in the documentary Goodnight Cleveland. The title is a reference to the mockumentary This Is Spınal Tap in which Derek Smalls yells "Hello Cleveland" to an unseen audience while the band tries to find their way onto the stage. Andersson adapted the phrase at the end of the band's show at the Agora Ballroom.

=== By the Grace of God and side projects ===
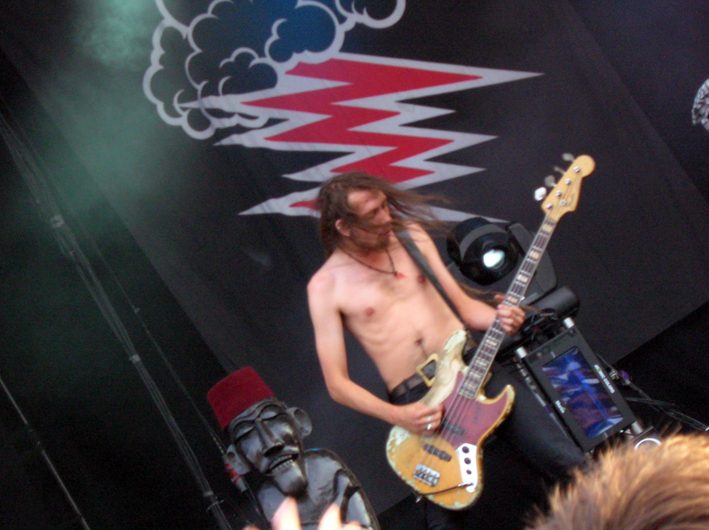
Kenny Håkansson in front of a By the Grace of God backdrop

In early 2002, the band released their first compilation of non-album tracks Cream Of The Crap Vol. 1, the CD's booklet contained one half of a poster designed by Andersson the second half of the poster was included in the second volume of the Cream of The Crap series. The band recorded 20 songs for their fifth album at Polar Studios in Stockholm, 13 of the 20 songs were included on By the Grace of God. It became the band's most commercially successful album, debuting at number two in Sweden and number eight in Finland, and the band was rewarded with another gold record in Sweden. The title track also spent seven weeks on the Swedish singles chart and gained significant airplay on radio and TV. The band also had the opportunity to be the opening act for The Rolling Stones and ZZ Top in Stockholm and Helsinki.

Before recording their next album, the band decided to take a break to find time to focus on other projects. Nicke Andersson worked on his side project The Solution with Scott Morgan, releasing the album Communicate! in 2004; he also contributed backing vocals for The Cardigans album Long Gone Before Daylight. Dahlqvist started a side project called Thunder Express, which was later renamed Dundertåget, and also recorded the album Fula Gubben Hitler with Swedish singer/songwriter Stefan Sundström; Dahlqvist was pictured on the album's cover suspended on a cross. Dahlqvist also toured along with former Hellacopters member Mattias Hellberg in support of the album.

=== Rock & Roll Is Dead ===
During the Hellacopters' break, the second compilation of non-album tracks Cream Of The Crap Vol. 2 was released. The band claims they have enough material for a Vol. 3 and a Vol. 4, but there are no plans for more parts in the Cream of the Crap series. Eriksson and Lindstrom also did a small DJ tour in Italy before joining up with the rest of the band to record and release Rock & Roll Is Dead in 2005. The name is a reference to the band's opinion about the state of the music industry.

Again it's a cool title for a rock'n'roll album, it's got rock'n'roll and dead in it. It sounds pretty good to me, looks good in print. But then again, it's the way I feel about the state of rock'n'roll today. I think it's a pity that the best big rock'n'roll today is played by 60 year olds. And they're called the Rolling Stones. I mean something's gotta be wrong, right? I love the Stones but where are all the young bands, where's the attention for them? There are exceptions, you know, The Hives, but I don't know...It seems pretty dead to me, hence the title.

— Nicke Andersson, on Rock and Roll is Dead'.

The album entered the Swedish album charts as number three and reached the top twenty in Finland. In March 2006 The Hellacopters went on their first American tour in three years, and also toured Sweden with The Hives, Millencollin, Backyard Babies and The Soundtrack of our Lives on the Where the Action Is Tour. The track "Nothing Terribly New" was also mentioned several times as one of E Street Band member Steven Van Zandt's favorite garage rock songs.

=== Head Off and break-up announcement ===
On 12 October 2007, The Hellacopters announced they would be breaking up after releasing their seventh full-length album Head Off, a collection of cover songs. According to the band, the reason for the breakup was to quit while they were still on top and not because of tension within the band. The album was originally presented as a regular Hellacopters studio album so that the fans would keep an open mind about the music. Håkansson also felt that it was fitting for the fans to get to know eleven new great bands to check out after the band's break up. The album debuted at number four in the Swedish charts and in the top 20 in Finland and Norway. The last Hellacopters shows were played at Debaser Medis in Stockholm 25 and 26 October; the concerts were filmed and streamed live on the band's MySpace page. Several friends and collaborators of the band were in the audience, including members of Sahara Hotnights, Entombed, Burst, Stefan Sundström, Texas Terri, Pernilla Andersson and "Demons" (who was the opening band for most of the dates on the tour). The band will also release a double live album, like many of their favorite bands from the 1970s did, with recordings from their entire "Tour Before the Fall."

=== Hiatus activities ===
Frontman Nicke Andersson continues to work with his other band Death Breath, originally a side project while he was with The Hellacopters, and plans to record a solo album. He also says that he would like to record and tour once again with his soul band The Solution, but due to all of the different members' involvement with other projects, finding time for everyone to record and tour is difficult. Andersson recently formed the band Cold Ethyl, but this band currently has no intentions of recording or releasing any original material. Robert Dahlqvist returned to his own band Dundertåget. Kenny Håkansson has plans to form a band with the drummer of the Danish rock band Baby Woodrose; the currently unnamed band is described as "psychedelic rock ala 1971." Robert Eriksson is working with his currently unsigned band Tramp and works at a music youth center called Black Sheep in Solna.

In March 2016, the first biography of the band, with every member participating, was released in French. The book, The Hellacopters, du kérosène dans les veines by Rudy Charis, was published by Camion Blanc and is due to be released in English in 2018. On 3 February 2017, former guitarist Robert Dahlqvist died at age 40. The band's distributor Sound Pollution stated that Dahlqvist died accidentally at home, having drowned in a bathtub following an epileptic seizure. At the time of his death, he had several concerts and appearances scheduled for the coming weeks, and had nearly completed recording a solo album under the pseudonym Strängen.

=== Supershitty to the Max! anniversary reunion ===
In April 2016, the band announced that their original lineup would be reuniting for the 20th anniversary of the release of their debut album, Supershitty to the Max!, initially playing the 2016 Sweden Rock Festival. The band also announced the release of an exclusive 12-inch vinyl record, with two tracks ("My Mephistophelean Creed" and "Don't Stop Now") written during the Supershitty to the Max! sessions but recorded in 2016. The Hellacopters went on to play several international festivals in 2016 and 2017, such as the Roskilde Festival, with (Hanoi Rocks, New York Dolls and Michael Monroe) bass player Sami Yaffa replacing original member Kenny Håkansson for the 2017 shows.

=== Eyes of Oblivion ===
On 17 December 2021 The Hellacopters announced a new studio album, Eyes of Oblivion, which was released on 1 April 2022. This marked the first time the band had released a full-length album of new material since 2008's Head Off, and the first full-length album with Dregen since 1997's Payin' the Dues. Andersson described the album as "The Beatles meets Judas Priest, or Lynyrd Skynyrd meets the Ramones, but the best way to describe this album is that it sounds like The Hellacopters today.". To promote the release of Eyes of Oblivion, the band released a seven-inch vinyl of the album's lead single, "Reap a Hurricane", on 4 February 2022. A music video for "Reap a Hurricane" was also released on the same day as the announcement.

On 17 January 2022 the band released the album's title track as its second single. This was followed by the third single, "So Sorry I Could Die", on 4 March 2022.

=== Overdriver ===
On 31 January 2025 Overdriver, the ninth album by the band was released.

== Musical style ==
Heavily influenced by early Kiss, punk and rock bands such as MC5, Ramones, Sex Pistols, The Damned, The Stooges and The Heartbreakers as well as bands such as Venom, Blue Cheer and Motörhead the band's debut album – Supershitty to the Max! – contained fast-paced songs and overdriven guitars. While the band's second album – Payin' the Dues – was in similar style as their debut album it also displayed a tighter musicianship and songwriting technique as well as keyboards by Anders Lindström. Grande Rock was the first studio album to be recorded without original guitarist Dregen and was a departure from the band's Detroit rock influenced sound to a more 1970s rock sound. The band continued to evolve their sound throughout their career, while Nicke Andersson claims that all of their music is based around three chords and a chorus the band had no interest in repeating themselves. On the band's later releases, Andersson's vocals incorporated soul influences from his and Scott Morgans side project The Solution. The Hellacopters also recorded many cover songs throughout their career of songs from bands and artist such as Radio Birdman, Misfits, Smokey Robinson, Nationalteatern, Alice Cooper, The Nomads, April Stevens, Sonic's Rendezvous Band, The Dictators, Love and others. However Andersson asserts that there is a difference between the music that inspires him and the music that has an influence on his music, Andersson has mentioned country music artist Guy Clark as an artist that inspires his songwriting without affecting the band's sound.

== Band members ==
=== Current ===
Nicke Andersson
Active: 1994–2008, 2016–present
Instruments: lead vocals, guitar, bass, clavinet, piano, percussion
Release contributions: all studio albums to date
Robert Eriksson
Active: 1994–2008, 2016–present
Instruments: drums, percussion, backing and occasional lead vocals
Release contributions: all studio albums to date
Anders Lindström
Active: 1996–2008, 2016–present (full-time from 1999)
Instruments: organ, piano, percussion, guitar, backing vocals
Release contributions: all releases from Payin' the Dues onwards
Rudolf de Borst
Active: 2018–present
Instruments: bass, backing vocals
Release contributions: Overdriver onwards
LG Valeta
Active: 2026–present
Instruments: guitar, backing vocals

==== Former touring musicians ====
LG Valeta
Active: 2024–2026
Instruments: guitar, backing vocals

=== Former ===
Kenny Håkansson
Active: 1994–2008, 2016
Instruments: bass, backing vocals
Release contributions: all studio releases until Head Off
Dregen
Active: 1994–1997, 2016–2026; inactive from touring 2024–2026
Instruments: guitar, backing and occasional lead vocals
Release contributions: from Supershitty to the Max! to Payin' the Dues, Eyes of Oblivion onwards
Danne Andersson
Active: 1997
Instruments: guitar, backing vocals
Release contributions: none
Mattias Hellberg
Active: 1997–1998
Instruments: guitar, backing vocals
Release contributions: Grande Rock and By the Grace of God
Robert Dahlqvist
Active: 1999–2008; died 2017
Instruments: guitar, backing vocals
Release contributions: all releases from High Visibility to Head Off
Sami Yaffa
Active: 2017
Instruments: bass, backing vocals
Release contributions: none

== Selected discography ==
Studio albums

- Supershitty to the Max! (1996)
- Payin' the Dues (1997)
- Grande Rock (1999)
- High Visibility (2000)
- By the Grace of God (2002)
- Rock & Roll Is Dead (2005)
- Head Off (2008)
- Eyes of Oblivion (2022)
- Overdriver (2025)

== Awards and nominations ==
Swedish Grammys

Year	Nominee / work	Award	Result
1996	Supershitty to the Max!	Best Hard Rock	Won
2006	Rock & Roll Is Dead	Best Rock Group of the Year	Nominated
2009	Head Off	Best Hard Rock	Nominated
2009	Head Off	Best Live Act	Nominated

P3 Guld

Year	Nominee / work	Award	Result
2005	Rock & Roll Is Dead	Best Rock Album of the Year	Nominated
2005	Rock & Roll Is Dead	Live Act of the Year	Nominated
2008	Head Off	Best Live Act	Nominated

Bandit Rock

Year	Nominee / work	Award	Result
2009	Head Off	Best Swedish Group	Nominated
2009	Head Off	Best Swedish Album	Nominated
2009	Head Off	Best Swedish Live Act	Nominated
2009	Head Off	Bandit Special Award	Won

Kerrang! Awards

Year	Nominee / work	Award	Result
1999	Grande Rock	Spirit of Independence	Won
Yasutora Sado
