= The Nomads (Swedish band) =

Swedish garage punk band

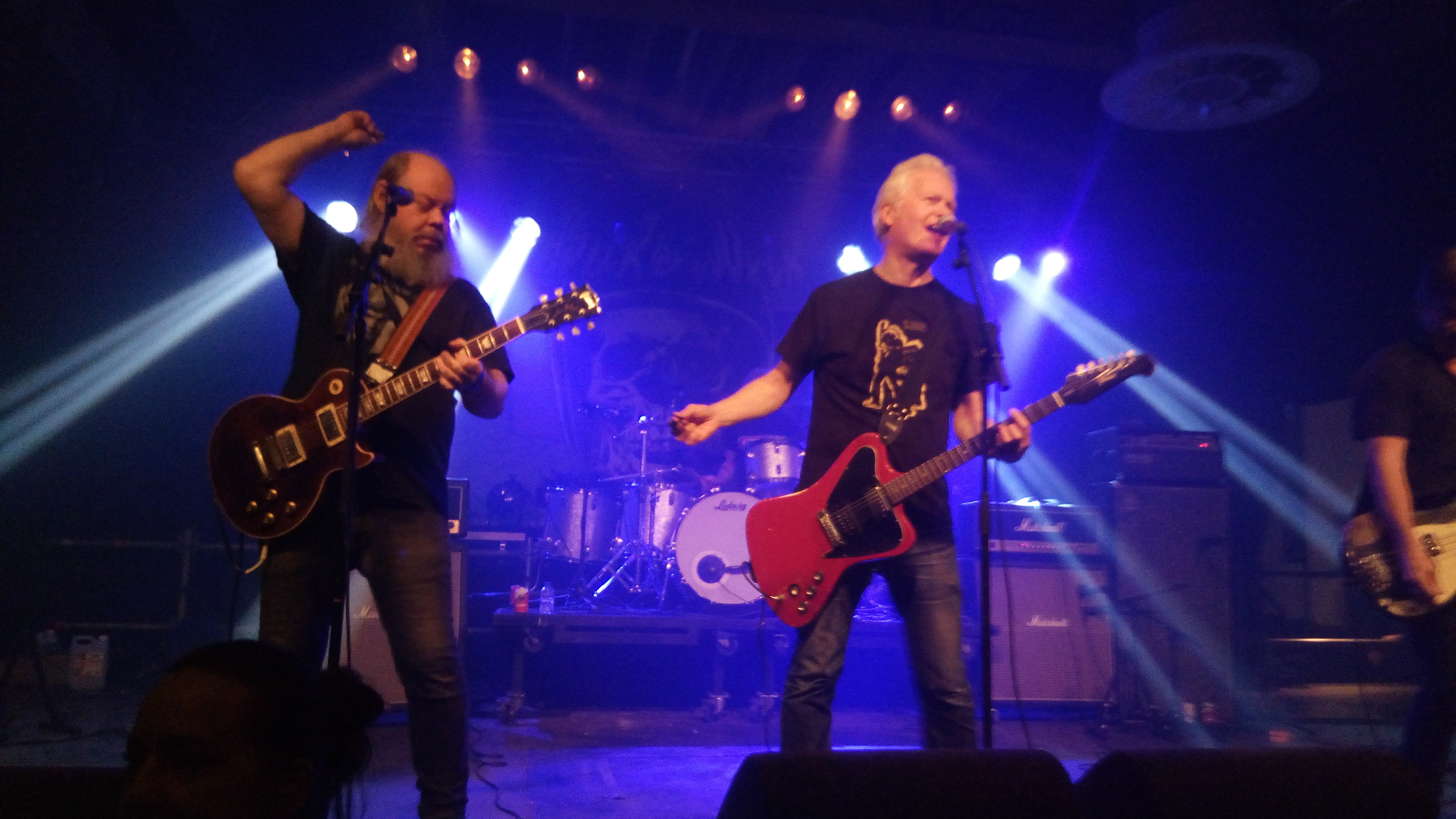
- Hans Östlund (l) & Nick Vahlberg (r) at the Faster & Louder Festival 2018 in Eindhoven, The Netherlands

Background information
- Origin: Solna, Sweden
- Genres: Garage punk
- Years active: 1981–present
- Labels: Amigo; Mans Ruin; Bad Afro Records; Safety Pin Records; White Jazz Reocords
- Members: Hans Östlund; Nick Vahlberg; Jocke Ericson; Björne Fröberg
- Past members: Joakim Tärnström; Ed Johnson; Frank Minarik; Tony Carlsson
- Website: http://www.thenomads.se

The Nomads are a Swedish garage punk band founded in 1981 by Hans Östlund, Nick Vahlberg, Joakim Tärnström, and Ed Johnson. Östlund and Vahlberg remains the only continuous members of the band.

The band's musical style is influenced by the MC5, The Stooges, Roky Erickson, The Cramps, The Ramones, New York Dolls, and other early garage rock and punk bands. The Nomads have been an influential band in the Scandinavian garage rock and punk scenes, inspiring bands such as The Hives, Hellacopters, "Demons", Gluecifer, and many others.

== Career ==
After releasing a number of records in the 1980s, the Nomads toured extensively and built a large fanbase without any significant rotation on either radio or television. In 2001, they celebrated their 20th anniversary with a gig in Stockholm that included appearances by members from Bob Hund, Sator, the Flaming Sideburns, Robert Johnson, and Punchdrunks, as well as members of the original lineup. At their gig at the Hultsfred Festival, the band once again took the opportunity to celebrate, with guest appearances by Nick Royale, Chips Kiesbye, Handsome Dick Manitoba, Ross the Boss, Jello Biafra, Chris Bailey, Odd Ahlgren, and Wayne Kramer. 20 Years Too Soon – A Tribute to the Nomads, was released in 2003, with bands like the Hellacopters, Electric Frankenstein, the Dictators, the Robots, Bob Hund, and Nitwitz contributing with their own version of their favorite Nomads songs. In 2008, the Nomads shared the stage with Roky Erickson at the Peace & Love festival in Sweden.

== Discography ==
=== Albums ===
- Where the Wolf Bane Blooms (1983)
- Temptation Pays Double (1984)
- Outburst (1984)
- Rat Fink a Boo-Boo (1987)
- Hardware (1987)
- All Wrecked Up (1989)
- Sonically Speaking (1991)
- Powerstrip (1994)
- Showdown! (1994)
- Flashback Number Nine (1995)
- Made in Japan (Recorded in Sweden) (1996)
- Raw & Rare (1996)
- The Cold Hard Facts of Life (1996)
- Big Sound 2000 (1999)
- Up-Tight (2001)
- Showdown 2-The 90's (2002)
- Nomadic Dementia (2006)
- Solna (2012)
- Demolición! Live At El Sol, Madrid (2015)

=== Singles ===
- Psycho/Come See Me (1981)
- Night Time/Boss Hoss (1982)
- Showdown (1984)
- She Pays The Rent/Nitroglycerine Shrieks (1985)
- E.S.P./Driving Sideways On A One Way Street (1985)
- Rockin' All Through The Night (1986)
- This Ain't The Summer Of Love/Out Of The Frying Pan, Into The Fire (1986) (as The Screamin' Dizbusters)
- 16 Forever/Salvation By Damnation (1987)
- The Next Big Thing/He's Waiting (1988) (as The Screamin' Dizbusters)
- Where The Wolf Bane Blooms/Rat Fink A Boo-Boo (1987)
- Fire And Brimstone/Beyond The Valley Of The Dolls (1989)
- My Deadly Game/I Have Always Been Here Before (1989)
- Red Temple Prayer (1991)
- Chinese Rocks (1991)
- Can't Keep My Mind Off You/Wasn't Born To Work (1991)
- Smooth/Showing Pictures To The Blind/Call Off Your Dogs (1991 (CD Re-issue)
- Can't Keep My Mind Off You/Wasn't Born To Work (1991) (CD Re-issue)
- Estrus Gearbox (1992)
- Primordial Ooze/Showing Pictures To The Blind/I'm Branded (1992)
- Wimp/I Remember (1993)
- Magdalena 93 (1993)
- Wasn't Born To Work/A Certain Girl/Rat Fink A Boo-Boo (1993)
- (I'm) Out Of It/Fan Club (1994)
- Kinda Crime/Dig Up the Hatchet (1994) (CD Re-issue)
- Blind Spot/(I'm) Out Of It (1994) (CD Re-issue)
- Dig Up The Hatchet/The Goodbye Look (1995)
- Wimp (live) (1995)
- Iron Dream/Edvin Medvind (1996)
- Kinda Crime (1996)
- Pack of Lies/Graveyard (1997)
- Love's Gone Bad/Leaving Here (1997)
- 16 Forever (live)(split w/ Dictators) (1997)
- I'm Gone/Ain’t Yet Dead (1999)
- She'll Always Be Mine/I'm Out Of It/I’ve Seen Better (1999)
- Trucker Speed (1999)
- The King Of Nighttrain/Top Alcohol (2000)
- The King Of Nighttrain/Top Alcohol (2000) (CD Re-issue)
- Crystal Ball/Mirrors (2001)
- Crystal Ball/Mirrors (2001) (CD -Re-issue)
- In A House Of Cards/Think Of As One (2002)
- Ain't No King Of Rock'n'Roll (2006)
- Miles Away/Something Else, Something New (2012)
- Better Off Dead (live), Wasn't Born To Work (live) (2016) (split 7-inch with Sator)
