= Cream of the Crap! Vol. 2 =

Compilation album by The Hellacopters
- Released: 25 February 2004
- Recorded: 1995–2001
- Genre: Garage rock, punk rock, garage punk
- Length: 67:13
- Label: White Jazz Records, Toy's Factory

The Hellacopters chronology
By the Grace of God (2002)	Cream of the Crap! Vol. 2 (2004)	Rock & Roll Is Dead (2005)

Cream of the Crap! Vol. 2 is the second compilation album from The Hellacopters, containing rare singles, B-sides, EP selections and other non-album tracks by the band. It was released in 2004.

== Track listing ==
1. "I Only Got the Shakes" (The Hellacopters) - 1:19
  - B-side of the single "Dirty Women"
2. "A House Is Not a Motel" (Arthur Lee) - 2:48
  - Love cover, released on split single with Powder Monkeys
3. "Geekstreak" (Nicke Andersson) - 3:31
  - From the EP Geekstreak
4. "Another Place" (The Hellacopters) - 4:30
  - B-side of the limited-edition single "What Are You"
5. "Slow Down (Take a Look)" (Scott Morgan) - 3:44
  - Sonic's Rendezvous Band cover, performed with Scott Morgan
6. "Holiday Cramps" (The Hellacopters) - 3:12
  - B-side of the single "The Devil Stole the Beat from the Lord"
7. "Lowdown" (The Hellacopters) - 2:00
  - B-side of the limited-edition single "What Are You"
8. "Be Not Content" (The Hellacopters) - 3:11
  - B-side of the single "The Devil Stole the Beat from the Lord"
9. "16 with a Bullet" (Scott Morgan) - 2:38
  - Performed with Scott Morgan
10. "Times Are Low" (The Hellacopters) - 2:45
  - From the limited edition "Rock & Roll Jihad"
11. "Low Down Shakin' Chills" (Vahleberg, Östlund, Carlsson, Johnsson) - 4:19
  - B-side of the "(Gotta Get Some Action) Now!"
12. "(It's Not a) Long Way Down" (The Hellacopters) - 3:57
  - From the vinyl single
13. "Time to Fall" (Deniz Tek) - 3:09
  - From the various artists album Flattery: A Tribute to Radio Birdman
14. "What Are You" (The Hellacopters) - 1:24
  - From the single "Whate Are You"
15. "Ain't Nothin' to Do" (Stiv Bators, Cheetah Chrome) - 2:40
  - B-side of the single "Soulseller", Dead Boys cover
16. "Kick This One Slow" (The Hellacopters) - 4:42
  - From the 10" Split with Gluecifer: "Respect The Rock"
17. "Bullet" (Glenn Danzig) - 1:34
  - From the various artists album Hell on Earth: A Tribute to the Misfits
18. "A Cross for Cain" - 2:42
  - B-side of the single "Toys and Flavors"
19. "All American Man" (Stanley, Delaney) - 3:54
  - From Frank Wants You to Join the 1996 Punk Rock 'N' Roll Horrorshow
20. "Ghoul School" (The Hellacopters) - 2:39
  - B-side of the "(Gotta Get Some Action) Now!"
21. "Master Race Rock" (Andy Shernoff) - 4:04
  - The Dictators cover, from the split single with Powder Monkeys
22. "Dirty Women" (Tony Iommi, Geezer Butler, Bill Ward, Ozzy Osbourne) - 2:19
  - Black Sabbath cover, from a vinyl single
