= Kenny Håkansson =

Swedish musician

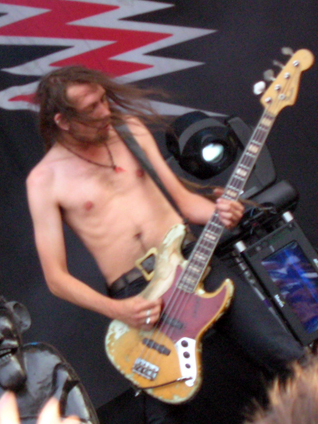
- Kenny Håkansson playing bass with the Hellacopters.

Background information
- Also known as: Kenny Hellacopter, John Lee Hellacopter
- Born: Kenny Dick Håkansson; 25 November 1972 (age 53)
- Genres: Garage rock, rock, garage punk, punk rock, garage rock revival, power pop, psychedelic rock
- Occupation(s): Musician, songwriter
- Instrument(s): Bass guitar, vocals, guitar
- Years active: 1981–present
- Labels: Psychout, White Jazz, Earache, BMG, Sub Pop, Birdsnest, Sweet Nothing, Musikexpressen, Universal, Lookout!, Columbia

Kenny Dick Håkansson is a Swedish musician, best known as the original bassist for the Hellacopters. The Hellacopters were founded by Håkansson's childhood friend Nicke Andersson as a side project to his role as a drummer in the death metal band Entombed.

== Recording career ==
During his younger years Håkansson regularly went through his father's record collection along with Andersson, and the two soon became fans of bands such as the MC5, the Ramones, Sex Pistols, the Damned and the Rolling Stones.

The Hellacopters have released six full-length albums with their own material, two non-album work compilations, and many other official releases. They have also done several tours throughout Scandinavia, Europe, the U.S.A., and Australia; they have opened for the Rolling Stones, KISS, and ZZ Top, and collaborated with artists such as Scott Morgan, the Flaming Sideburns, Backyard Babies, Quadrajets and Gluecifer. In late 2007 the band announced that they were going to break up after the release of their collection of cover songs, Head Off, and their Tour Before the Fall which ended in late October 2008.

Besides his work with the Hellacopters, Håkansson has also contributed songs for his bandmate Robert Dahlqvist's side project Thunder Express, The doits albums, as well as with lyrics for Entombed's early records. He also recorded and toured with Art-rock band Sofia Härdig and The Needles. He is now playing bass with Mary´s Kids.

Håkansson's main instrument is a highly road-worn 1969 Fender Jazz Bass with almost all its paint stripped off due to constant use. For amplification Håkansson uses an Orange OR120 amplifier head which he runs through an Ampeg 8x10 cabinet; he occasionally also uses an Ampeg head with the same cabinet.

== Selected discography ==
- 1992 Entombed - Clandestine (Lyrics)
- 1992 Entombed - Stranger Aeons (Lyrics)
- 1993 Entombed - Wolverine Blues (Lyrics)
- 1993 Entombed - Hollowman (Lyrics)
- 1996 The Hellacopters - Supershitty to the Max! (Bass)
- 1997 The Hellacopters - Payin' the Dues (Bass)
- 1999 The Hellacopters - Grande Rock (Bass)
- 2000 The Hellacopters - High Visibility (Bass)
- 2002 Wayne Kramer - Adult World (Bass)
- 2002 The Hellacopters - By the Grace of God (Bass)
- 2005 The Hellacopters - Rock & Roll Is Dead (Bass, backing vocals)
- 2007 Thunder Express - Republic Disgrace (Lyrics)
- 2008 The Hellacopters - Head Off (Bass)
