= Grande Rock =

Studio album by The Hellacopters
- Released: 17 May 1999
- Genres: Rock, hard rock, blues rock
- Length: 37:56
- Labels: White Jazz Records; Toy's Factory; Gestrichen; Sub Pop; Deaf and Dumb
- Producer: The Hellacopters

The Hellacopters chronology
Payin' the Dues (1997)	Grande Rock (1999)	High Visibility (2000)

Professional ratings
Review scores
Source	Rating
AllMusic	4/5 stars

Grande Rock is the third album released by the Swedish rock band The Hellacopters. Due to the departure of original guitarist Dregen, pianist Anders Lindström stepped in to record guitars under the pseudonym Boba Lee Fett. The record was released both on CD and on vinyl, the vinyl version was available in seven different colors depending on which country it was sold in. The Japanese release also contains the bonus tracks "Only Got The Shakes" and "Keepin' On". The Shock CD version contains "Makes It Alright", "Heart of the Matter" and "Holiday Cramp" as bonus tracks as well as two music videos on an additional CD-ROM.

On 16 February 2024, the album was re-released in a re-mixed form and the original album was given a remastering treatment. The new re-mix contains some newly recorded guitar tracks by Dregen who didn't appear on the original album.

== Track listing ==
All tracks are written by The Hellacopters.

Grande Rock track listing
No.	Title	Length
1.	"Action De Grâce"	2:17
2.	"Alright Already Now"	2:56
3.	"Move Right out of Here"	2:09
4.	"Welcome to Hell"	5:19
5.	"The Electric Index Eel"	1:52
6.	"Paul Stanley"	2:01
7.	"The Devil Stole the Beat from the Lord"	3:54
8.	"Dogday Mornings"	3:20
9.	"Venus in Force"	3:00
10.	"5 vs. 7"	5:39
11.	"Lonely"	3:07
12.	"Renvoyer"	2:22

== Personnel ==
The Hellacopters

- Nicke Andersson – vocals, guitars
- Kenny Håkansson – bass
- Anders Lindström – guitars, piano
- Robert Eriksson – drums

Additional

- Matt McHellburger – harp, vocals
- Pike McWalleye – vocals, acoustic guitar
- Zquaty – percussion
- Odd De Cologne – voice

Production

- Stefan Boman – mixing, editing
- Åsa Winzell – mastering
- Anders Lind – recording engineer

Artwork

- Ray Hill – pinstriping
- Lance Hammond – photography

== Charts ==
Chart performance for Grande Rock
Chart (1999)	Peak position
Finnish Albums (Suomen virallinen lista)	30
Swedish Albums (Sverigetopplistan)	10

2024 chart performance for Grande Rock
Chart (2024)	Peak position
UK Rock & Metal Albums (Official Charts)	35
