= Robert Dahlqvist =

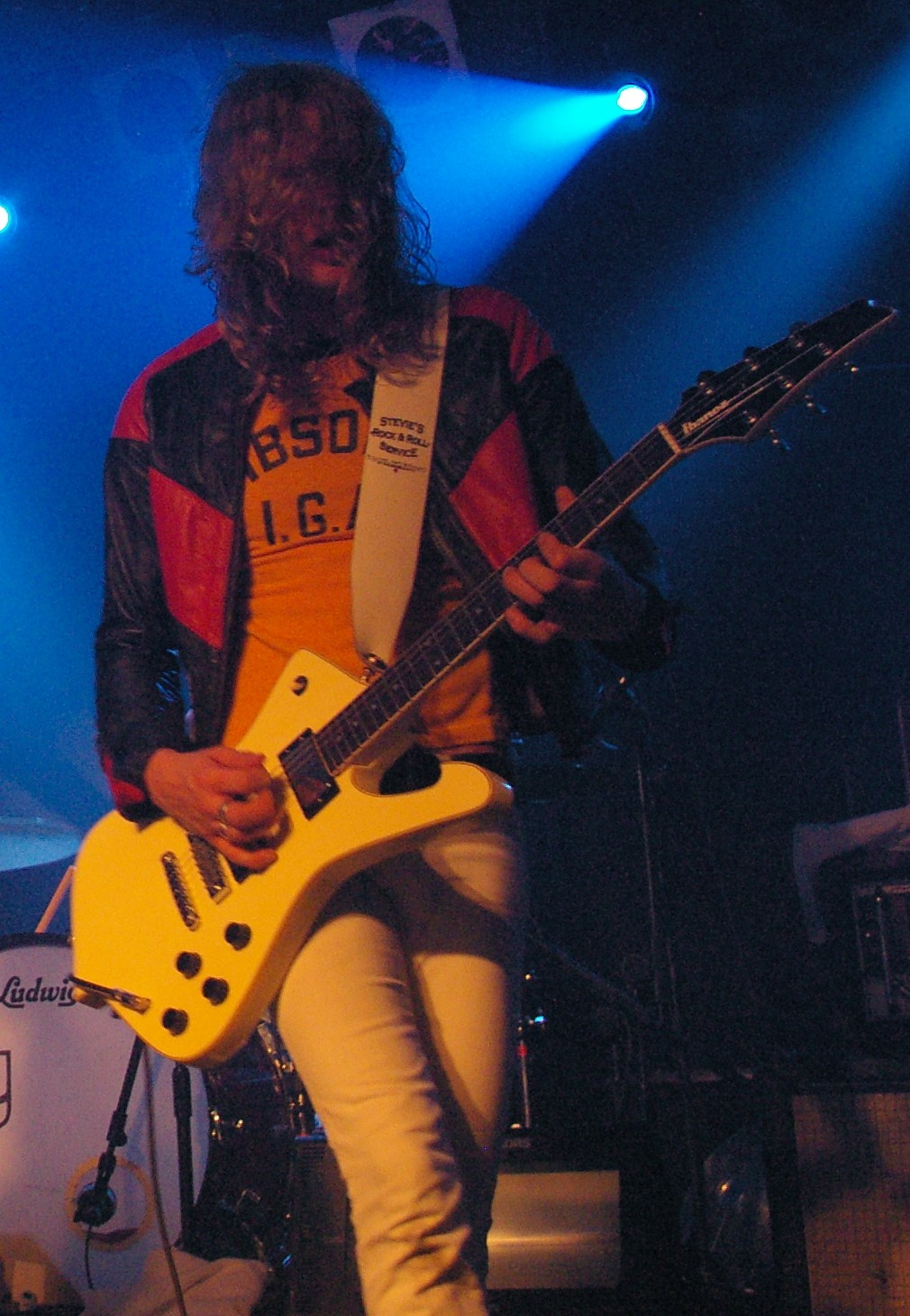
- Robert Dahlqvist performing with the Hellacopters, 2008.

Background information
- Also known as: Strängen, Strings
- Born: Jens Robert Dahlqvist; 16 April 1976; Visby, Sweden
- Died: 1 February 2017 (aged 40) Stockholm, Sweden
- Genres: Rock
- Occupations: Musician, songwriter
- Instruments: Vocals, guitar, bass
- Labels: Psychout Records, Razzia Records, White Jazz Records, BMG, Sweet Nothing Records, National, Universal Music, Wild Kingdom
- Formerly of: The Hellacopters, Thunder Express/Dundertåget, Stefan Sundström, Diamond Dogs, The Solution
- Website: Official MySpace

Robert Dahlqvist (16 April 1976 – 1 February 2017) was a Swedish guitarist and vocalist best known for his nine-year tenure with the rock band The Hellacopters. He was also the lead singer and lead guitarist for Dundertåget (first known as Thunder Express), a band originally started as a side project to his work with The Hellacopters. At the time of his death at age 40, Dahlqvist had nearly completed his second solo album, under the name Strängen.

== Career ==
=== Early life and career ===
Dahlqvist was born in Visby, Sweden but grew up in Uddevalla, Sweden, and got his first guitar at the age of ten and attended music school but quit after a month frustrated over not being allowed to play Kiss songs. At age fifteen, his mother got him an electric guitar and he started to focus more seriously on his playing. Dahlqvist soon started playing in bands and worked at a bar where he got to know members of the Swedish rock band the Hellacopters.

=== The Hellacopters ===
After losing original guitarist Dregen and utilizing temporary guitarists Chuck Pounder and Mattias Hellberg, the Hellacopters sought a new permanent guitarist to join the tour for their 1999 album Grande Rock. Hearing about this, Dahlqvist contacted the band and requested an audition, after which he joined the band full-time. His first full album with the Hellacopters was High Visibility in 2000, and by that time they had given him the nickname "Strings."

During his time in The Hellacopters, Dahlqvist was also a member of Stefan Sundström's backing band, and appeared on albums by The Solution and Diamond Dogs, both of which featured his Hellacopters bandmates. With the Hellacopters, Dahlqvist recorded four studio albums, four EPs, two split albums and many other releases. In October 2007, the Hellacopters announced they would be breaking up after releasing their last full-length album Head Off and completing their The Tour Before the Fall farewell tour. The band reconvened in 2016 but without Dahlqvist.

=== Later activities ===
Dahlqvist first formed the band Thunder Express in 2004 as a side project in conjunction with his work with the Hellacopters. They released the albums We Play for Pleasure in 2004 and Republic Disgrace in 2007. That band then switched to Swedish lyrics and renamed themselves Dundertåget (the Swedish translation of "Thunder Express"). They released the albums Skaffa ny Frisyr in 2008 and Dom Feta Åren är Förbi in 2010, before disbanding in 2011.

Dahlqvist's next project was Strängen, the Swedish translation of his nickname "Strings" from his time with the Hellacopters. He released the single "Rocken är inte död!" ("Rock Isn't Dead!") under this name, and announced a new album which would be his first full-length work in five years. According to his manager, the album was nearly finished at the time of Dahlqvist's death in February 2017, with some of the final sessions having taken place a few days earlier.

== Death ==
Dahlqvist died on 1 February 2017 at age 40. Sound Pollution, distributor for the Hellacopters, stated that Dahlqvist died accidentally at his home in Bagarmossen, having drowned in a bathtub following an epileptic seizure. At the time of his death, he had several concerts and appearances scheduled for the coming weeks.

== Musical equipment ==
Dahlqvist favoured vintage guitars, effects and amplifiers.

Guitars

- 1964 Epiphone Crestwood
- 1965 Epiphone Crestwood
- Gibson Les Paul Sunburst
- Gibson Les Paul Goldtop
- Epiphone Flying V
- Gibson Flying V
- Gibson Firebird
- Ibanez Iceman
- 1976 Fender Stratocaster
- 12-string acoustic guitar
- Resonator guitar

Effects

- VOX Wah Wah pedal
- BJF Baby Blue Overdrive
- Orange Overdrive

Amplifiers

- Orange OTR-120 amplifier
- Orange 4x12 cabinet
- VOX AC-50 amplifier
- Marshall Superlead
- Marshall JMP Superbass
- Matchless Clubsman

== Selected discography ==
- 2001 The Hellacopters/The Flaming Sideburns – White Thrash Soul (guitar)
- 2002 The Hellacopters – High Visibility (guitar, backing vocals)
- 2002 The Hellacopters – By the Grace of God (guitar, backing vocals)
- 2003 Wilmer X – Lyckliga Hundar (guitar)
- 2003 Wayne Kramer – Adult World (guitar)
- 2004 Thunder Express – We Play for Pleasure (vocals, guitar)
- 2004 Stefan Sundström – Hjärtats Melodi (guitar)
- 2004 The Diamond Dogs – Black River Road (guitar)
- 2004 The Solution – Communicate! (lead guitar)
- 2005 Stefan Sundström – Stolt Men Inte Nöjd (guitar, backing vocals)
- 2005 The Hellacopters – Rock & Roll Is Dead (guitar, backing vocals)
- 2006 Stefan Sundström – Fabler från Bällingebro (guitar)
- 2007 Thunder Express – Republic Disgrace (vocals, guitar)
- 2008 The Hellacopters – Head Off (guitar, backing vocals)
- 2009 Dundertåget – Skaffa Ny Frisyr (vocals, guitar)
- 2010 Dundertåget – Dom Feta Åren är Förbi (vocals, guitar)
- 2010 Necronaut – Necronaut (lead guitar)
- Stefan Sundström – 5 Dagar i Augusti (guitar, backing vocals)
