= Johan Forsman =

Swedish musician, singer, record producer

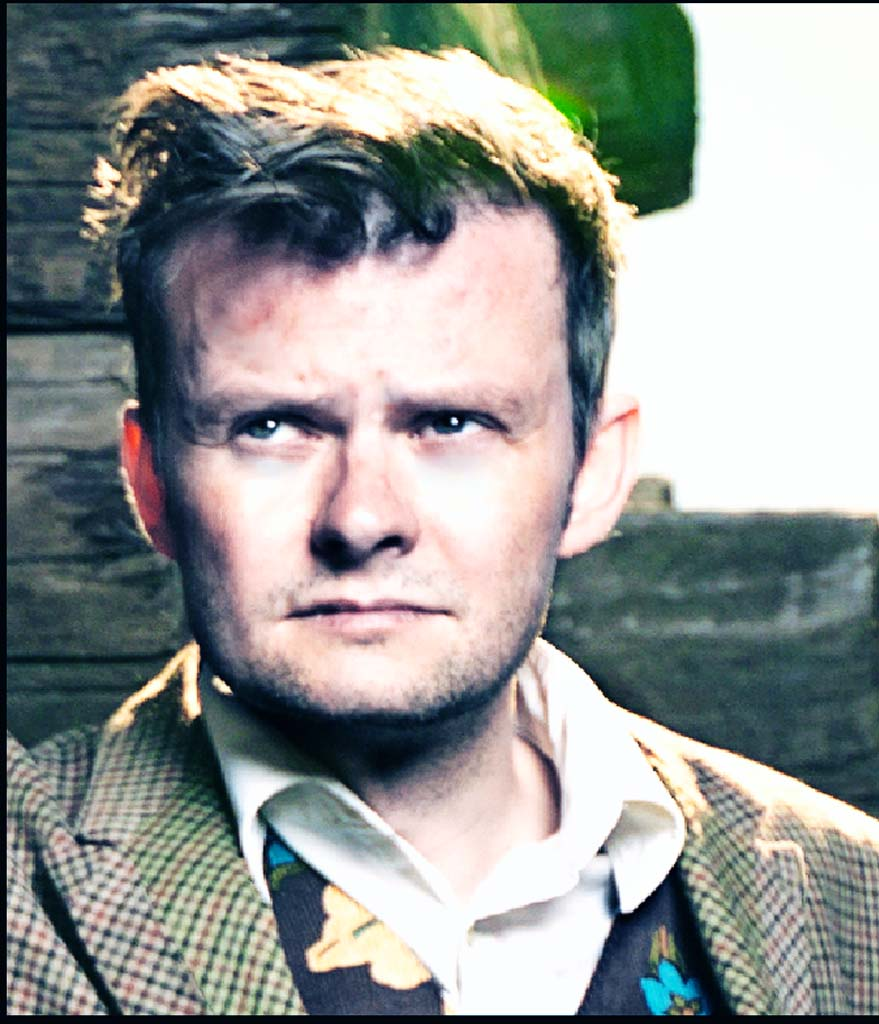
- Johan Forsman

Background information
- Born: 15 June 1968 (age 58); Gothenburg, Sweden
- Genres: Rock pop Alternative rock
- Occupations: Record producer, musician
- Instruments: Vocals, guitar, bass guitar, keyboard

Johan Forsman or Johan Forsman Löwenström (born 15 June 1968) is a Swedish musician, singer, record producer, songwriter, music arranger and engineer based in Gothenburg, Sweden. He was a member of krautrock band Hübrizine in the late eighties and psychedelic rock band The Bad Karma and The Simpkins in the early nineties. Forsman has worked with musical acts such as the Soundtrack of our lives, Caesars, Weeping Willows, Håkan Hellström, Karin Dreijer's early band Honey is Cool, Jens Lekman, Thåström, among others. Johan Forsman is still active as a record producer/engineer and is currently a member of Tapefly.

== Early career ==
Forsman began recording artists in the late eighties using simple formulas of recording. Only equipment fabricated prior to 1980 were permitted in the studio. This resulted in a non-typical sound for the late eighties era. Among the first bands that had their early recordings engineered by Forsman were Broder Daniel and psychedelic rock group Whipped cream and other delights, and Silverbullit. Eventually Forsman caught the attention of Union Carbide Productions front men Ebbot Lundberg, Björn Olsson and Ian Person as they were looking for someone to record their new band, the Soundtrack of our lives. Between 1994 and 1996 the pre-productions for TSOOL's first 2 double albums were recorded. Some of this material can be found under the name the Romelanda sessions.

== Record production ==
Forsman was involved in producing the following albums:

Year	Role	Artist	Album / Song	Notes
1998	Producer	Björn Olsson	Instrumental Music...to Submerge in...and Disappear Through	
1999		Håkan Hellström	Känn ingen sorg för mig Göteborg	Platinum selling and multiple Grammy awards
1999	Sound engineer	Thåström	Det är ni som är konstiga, det är jag som är normal	
1999	Producer, mixer	Caesars	Cherry Kicks	
1999	Producer	the Soundtrack of our lives	Behind the music	Grammy nominated and gold-selling album
2001	Co-writer	Christina Löwenström (co-writer),	Canine Prey	Became the 2008 Swedish hit För en lång lång tid, when it was re-written and re-produced into Swedish by Håkan Hellström
2001	Producer, engineer	Weeping Willows	Into the Light	Platinum selling
2001	Engineer	Caesars	Love for the Streets	The iPod launch song Jerk it out was picked by Apple
2002	Producer, engineer	Håkan Hellström	Det är så jag säger det	Co-produced with Håkan Hellström and Timo Räisänen
2002	Mixer	Thåström	Mannen som blev en gris	Gold selling album
2003	Producer, engineer	The Soundtrack of our lives	Origin	Multi grammy nominated and gold selling album
2004	Mixer	WE	Smugglers	
2004	Engineer, recording	Silverbullit	Arclight	
2005	Musician, co-producer, engineer, mixer	Håkan Hellström	Nåt lånat, nåt blått, nåt gammalt, nåt nytt	Gold selling
2006	Engineer, remixer	the Soundtrack of our lives	A Present from the Past	
2007	Mixer	Jens Lekman	Night Falls Over Kortedala	Grammy award-winning album
2008	Mixer, editor, engineer	the Soundtrack of our lives	Communion	

== Sources ==
- Tapefly The Lifting Of The Veil
- Tapefly The Lifting Of The Veil
- Expressen
- Gaffa. Recension
- Sample albums. Tapefly The Lifting Of The Veil
- Tapefly Lugn och fin
- Tapefly Trädgårn Gbg 31 mars
- Expressen
- Johan Forsman. History
- Spelningarna uppdaterade
- Marrakesh the band
- Fair field. Live från studion
