= String Theory (artist collective) =

The String Theory
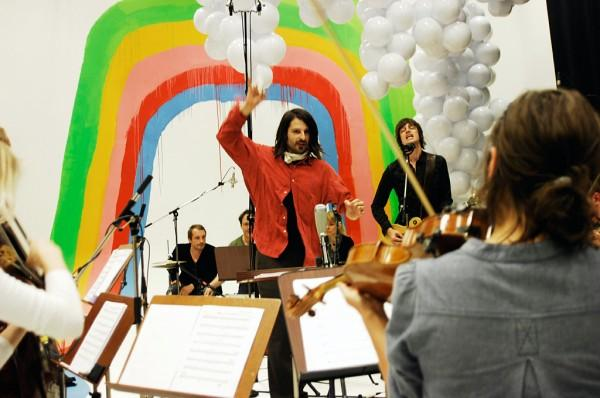
- The String Theory workshop, Gothenburg Sweden, June 2009

Background information
- Origin: Gothenburg, Sweden and Berlin, Germany
- Years active: 2006–present
- Label: Artbeat
- Website: wearethestringtheory.org

The String Theory is an international artist collective that provides a creative joint venture production platform for composers, artists, musicians and visual artists from different countries. The collective was founded in 2006. Their first project was The Berlin String Theory in 2006–2008, followed by The Göteborg String Theory in 2009–11. Since 2012 the collective's orchestra goes by the name The String Theory and has performed live with Swedish-Argentinian artist José González during a number of European and North American tours. Live recordings from those tours are featured on the double album Live in Europe. In November 2019, the ensemble were nominated for a Grammy Award 2020 in the category of Best Spoken Word Album for their collaborative album with American spoken word poet Sekou Andrews, Sekou Andrews & The String Theory.

== The Berlin String Theory 2006-2008 ==
The idea of The String Theory was born in Berlin, Germany in 2006 and developed by the musician/artist couple PC Nackt and Chérie of the band Warren Suicide, composers Ben Lauber and Nils Tegen, Party Arty curator Jan Kage and Artist Beatbox Eliot among others. Based on an idea of experimental musical development and grassroots networking outside the existing business structures, The Berlin String Theory was founded, starting out as an impromptu basement event of close friends performing their songs with a string quartet instead of electric guitars and computers, yet in the course of a couple of months developing into a high-output workshop and a major multimedia project involving more than 100 musicians, artists, producers, journalists, designers, technicians, visual artists, a documentary film team, painters and poets, culminating in a show at Berlin's Volksbühne theater on New Year's Day 2008.

== The Göteborg String Theory 2009-2010 ==
The musicians Sebastian Gäbel and Nathalie Barusta Gäbel, who participated in The Berlin String Theory, took the project idea to their hometown Gothenburg, Sweden and gathered an abundance of artists at Kokokaka filmstudio for the next leap. José González, Midaircondo, Wildbirds & Peacedrums, Studio, Jaqee, Amanda Bergman a.k.a. Jaw Lesson, Silverbullit, El Perro Del Mar, Fox Machine, Ebbot Lundberg (The Soundtrack of Our Lives), Bow & Arrow and Jmy Haze were among those who made The Göteborg String Theory happen in June 2009. Their original songs were arranged by Berlin-based The String Theory composers PC Nackt, Ben Lauber and Nils Tegen for the string quartet Qvartiett and other classical and jazz musicians. Together with the artists the new renditions were rehearsed and documented during a five-day workshop and then performed for the first time at Clandestino Festival. The documentations resulting from those days in June were subsequently released on the record label Kning Disk.

The next performance, coinciding with the album release, was at Göteborgs Konserthus the 17th of April 2010. Even more artists joined The Göteborg String Theory on this evening and premiered their songs in new arrangements: Anna von Hausswolff, Daniel “Hurricane” Gilbert (also guitarist with Håkan Hellström) and noise avantgardists The Skull Defekts featuring Daniel Higgs (Lungfish) from Baltimore. Video artists also contribute by visually interpreting the sound pieces produced during the workshop, and these visuals were included in the performance. The concert was broadcast live on Swedish National Radio and gained critical acclaim, in comparisons with Krzysztof Penderecki, Arnold Schönberg and Nico Muhly. Some of the live recordings from the show at Göteborgs Konserthus were later released as a limited edition vinyl EP on Kning Disk.

== Collaboration with José González 2011 ==
The String Theory orchestra collaborated with José González on yet another occasion – a sold-out European tour in March/April 2011, under the name The Göteborg String Theory. PC Nackt had written 11 new arrangements for González's songs and conducted the 25 person orchestra. An songsmith and world-known artist in his own right, González became a part of the ensemble, performing to audiences in 19 cities and garnering critical praise along the way. A film documentary about the performance at the Copenhagen Concert hall was produced by Danish National Television.

== The String Theory European and US tours 2017-2019 ==
The String Theory and José González continued their artistic partnership in 2017 for a concert tour through 27 European and 3 American cities. In fall 2018, coinciding with the release of the double live album José González & The String Theory – Live in Europe (Imperial Recordings), they toured Europe again, playing 23 shows in 24 days, before embarking on a North American tour in spring 2019.

== The String Theory & Sekou Andrews 2019 ==
Born during a 4-day workshop & recording session in April 2019, when The String Theory had just finished the US leg of their world tour with José González in Los Angeles, the recording of the song Good Vibes marked the beginning of the ensemble's collaboration with two-time national poetry slam champion Sekou Andrews. In June 2019, another 5 tracks were recorded between Los Angeles and Berlin. The resulting album Sekou Andrews & The String Theory was released August 30, 2019 on California Music and received a Grammy 2020 nomination. It also won in The 18th Annual Independent Music Awards for the Best Spoken Word Album, the song "Be Voiceful" won for the Best Spoken Word Song.

== Discography ==
- 2022 – Origin (Radicalis Music)
- 2020 – The Los Angeles Suite (Clouds Hill)
- 2019 – Sekou Andrews & The String Theory with Sekou Andrews (California Music)
- 2019 – Live in Europe with José González (Imperial Recordings)
- 2011 – The Göteborg String Theory – Live at the Gothenburg Concert Hall (Kning Disk, re-released 2020 by Artbeat)
- 2010 – The Göteborg String Theory Album (Kning Disk, re-released 2020 by Artbeat)
- 2008 – The Berlin String Theory Album

== Related projects ==
- 2011 The Aachen String Theory Workshop
- 2010 The Berlin Weekend
- 2009 The Göteborg String Theory
- 2006–2008 The Berlin String Theory
