= Dom kallar oss artister =

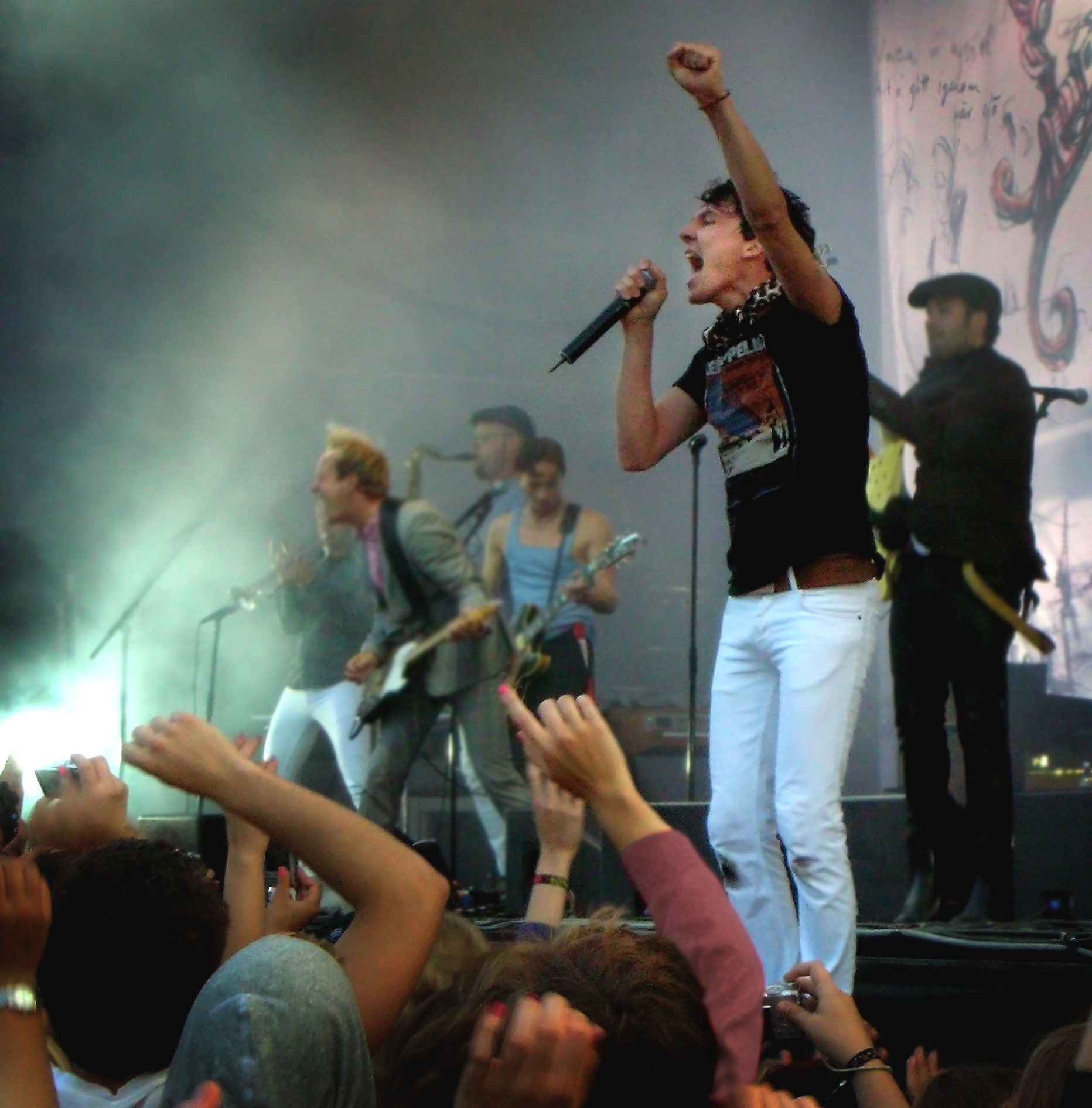
- Håkan Hellström appeared in the first episode
- Genre: documentary
- Country of origin: Sweden
- Original language: Swedish
- No. of seasons: 5
- No. of episodes: 43

Production
- Running time: 30 minutes

Original release
- Network: SVT 1
- Release: 28 October 2008 – 17 December 2014

Dom kallar oss artister (English: "They call us artists") is a television program on SVT1 in Sweden premiering on 28 October 2008. 12 olika artisters vardag följdes i 12 avsnitt.

Each half-hour episode follows a Swedish musical artist or group through such activities as busy promotion days in Los Angeles, costume tests for coming tours, hard rock camping in the mountain valleys of Slovenia, recordings in Nashville, and gigs at the home of fans in Enköping.

All episodes share standard segments in which each artist tells about the moment that made them understand that music would become their life, "I mitt arkiv"; shares their favorite music playing in their headphones, "I mina hörlurar"; and make a unique appearance with the song that they think defines them as artists, "Till sist".

The title theme is written and performed by Björn Olsson, who besides his own solo project, has played in The Soundtrack of Our Lives and produced, among others, Håkan Hellström and Mando Diao.

== Episodes ==
=== Season 1 ===
1. Håkan Hellström - Håkan shows his favorite places in Gothenburg. His musical memory is The Danny Davis Singers' "Night Train To Memphis". Håkanäs music favorites are Glasvegas, Fleet Foxes and Franska Trion. He plays "Too Late for Edelweiss" at the end of the program.
2. Per Gessle - Per Gessle in the studio in Vallarum, Skåne. His musical memory is The Kinks' album The Kink Kontroversy. Per's music favorites are Merz, Sebastien Tellier and the Nelly Furtado, and he plays "Tycker Om När Du Tar På Mig" at the end of the episode.
3. Marit Bergman - Marit goes on a house gig for a fan in Enköping.
4. In Flames - The band on tour in Slovenia and Germany.
5. Petter - A typical day with between photo sessions, interviews and office work.
6. Maia Hirasawa – Her inspirations and a recording trip to Österlen for her next album.
7. The Hives – Following Howlin' Pelle from Germany by airplane, train, and ferry ride to Gröna Lund in Stockholm and playing in all-new costumes. Howlin' Pelle sings with The Domestic Bumblebees.
8. Nina Persson - A day with Nina in her new home in Harlem, New York.
9. Jill Johnson - Jill Johnson writes songs and shows off her second hometown, Nashville.
10. Orup - Dance and costume tests for the autumn tour with Lena PH.
11. Lykke Li - A busy day in Los Angeles with performances, interviews, photo shoots, television appearances, etc.
12. The Hellacopters - Farewell tour from rehearsal before departure to the last gig at the tour bus.

=== Season 2 ===
1. Markus Krunegård - About Markus Music and inspiration, also about his hometown Norrköping
2. Björn Skifs - Björn is recording a new album.
3. Amanda Jensen - Amandas Christmas Party
4. Ralf Gyllenhammar - Touring in Finland
5. Jenny Wilson - A Gospel inspired gig at The Royal Dramatic Theatre in Stockholm
6. Titiyo - A typical day in Stockholm for Titiyo, recording and performing.
7. The Ark - Records a new album and talks about their music
8. Robyn - Following Robyn while she records her new album with Röyksopp, dancing and a photoshoot. She performs Show Me Love at Sergels torg at the end.
