= Caesars (band) =

Swedish rock band

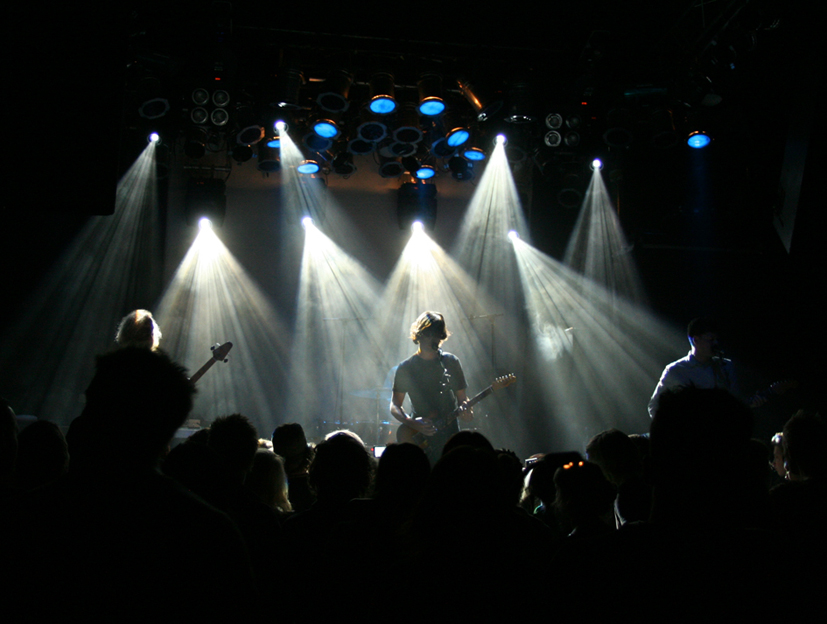
- Caesars performing in April 2008

Background information
- Also known as: Twelve Caesars (1995–1999); Caesars Palace (2000–2002)
- Origin: Stockholm, Sweden
- Genres: Indie rock; garage rock
- Years active: 1995–2012, 2017–2019
- Labels: Astralwerks; Dolores; EMI; Virgin
- Past members: Joakim Åhlund; David Lindquist; Nino Keller; César Vidal; Jens Örjenheim; Klas Åhlund

Caesars were a Swedish indie rock band from Stockholm, formed in 1995. In their native country, the band was originally known as Caesars Palace, a name which was changed to avoid conflicting with the name of the Las Vegas hotel. In the rest of Scandinavia they are known as Twelve Caesars.

== Career ==
Outside of Sweden, the band are best known for the song "Jerk It Out", which was originally featured in the snowboarding video Afterbang in 2002, as well as the Electronic Arts video games SSX 3 and FIFA Football 2004, and on the PlayStation 2 game LMA Manager 2005. The song also appeared in the Wii games Just Dance and Dance Dance Revolution SuperNova, and in the Wii version of Samba de Amigo as downloadable content. It has also been the backdrop of television advertisements for brands such as iPod (2005) and Renault (2009). The song is featured on the band's 39 Minutes of Bliss (In an Otherwise Meaningless World), Paper Tigers, and Love for the Streets albums. The song is featured in episode 2 of Super Pumped and episode 6 of Ted Lasso.

Their song "We Got to Leave" is the theme song for the television series Confessions of a Matchmaker. The song also appears in films such as John Tucker Must Die and The Benchwarmers.

The album Strawberry Weed was released in Scandinavia on 5 March 2008. The 24-track long double album was produced by Ebbot Lundberg from Soundtrack of Our Lives. A significant difference from previous albums was that guitarist Joakim Åhlund and drummer Nino Keller shared vocal duty with César Vidal.

In an interview on Sveriges Radio P3 on February 13, 2012, Joakim Åhlund said that the band is on hiatus until further notice.

In December 2017, Caesars played a surprise reunion gig in Stockholm, their first since 2009. In 2018, the band performed in Stockholm's Popaganda Festival. The band played several shows in Sweden through 2019 before entering a second hiatus.

Band member Joakim Åhlund is also a founding member of the Teddybears.

== Band members ==
Final lineup

- César Vidal – lead vocals, guitar (1995–2012, 2017–2019)
- Joakim Åhlund – guitars, backing and occasional lead vocals (1995–2012, 2017–2019)
- David Lindqvist – bass (1996–2012, 2017–2019)
- Nino Keller – drums, backing and occasional lead vocals (2000–2012, 2017–2019)

Other members

- Jens Örjenheim – drums (1998–2000)
- Klas Åhlund – keyboards, various instruments, production (1998–2002; session/touring musician)

== Discography ==
=== Albums ===
==== Studio albums ====
List of studio albums, with selected chart positions and certifications
Title	Details	Peak chart positions						Certifications
Title	Details	SWE	FRA	GER	SCO	UK	US Heat.	Certifications
Youth Is Wasted on the Young (as Twelve Caesars)	Released: 8 December 1998; Label: Dolores; Formats: CD, LP	59	—	—	—	—	—	
Cherry Kicks (as Caesars Palace)	Released: 2000; Label: Dolores, Virgin; Formats: CD, LP	14	—	—	—	—	—	
Love for the Streets (as Caesars Palace)	Released: 22 April 2002; Label: Dolores, Virgin; Formats: CD, LP	3	—	—	—	—	—	IFPI SWE: Gold
Paper Tigers	Released: 26 April 2005; Label: Astralwerks, Toshiba-EMI, Virgin; Formats: CD, LP	13	143	90	34	40	44	
Strawberry Weed	Released: 5 March 2008; Label: Dolores; Formats: CD, LP	16	—	—	—	—	—	
"—" denotes a release that did not chart or was not released in that territory

==== Compilation albums ====
Title	Details
39 Minutes of Bliss (In an Otherwise Meaningless World)	Released: 21 April 2003; Label: Astralwerks, Virgin; Formats: CD, LP

=== EPs ===
- 1995 – Shake It 3-track EP: "Shake It" / "Odd Job" / "Born Cool [7-inch Dolores]
- 1996 – Rock De Puta Mierda 7-track EP: "Phenobarbital" / "3D-TV" / "Automatic" / "Crap-thinker" / "This Man, This Monster" / "Pupo Diavolo" / "You're My Favorurite"

=== Singles ===
Title	Year	Peak chart positions										Certifications	Album
Title	Year	SWE	AUS	AUT	EUR	FRA	GER	IRE	SCO	UK	US	Certifications	Album
"(I'm Gonna) Kick You Out"	1998	—	—	—	—	—	—	—	—	—	—		Youth Is Wasted on the Young
"Sort It Out"	1998	—	—	—	—	—	—	—	—	—	—		Youth Is Wasted on the Young
"Fun 'n Games"	2000	—	—	—	—	—	—	—	—	—	—		Cherry Kicks
"From the Bughouse"	2000	—	—	—	—	—	—	—	—	—	—		Cherry Kicks
"Crackin' Up"	2000	—	—	—	—	—	—	—	—	—	—		Cherry Kicks
"Only You"	2000	—	—	—	—	—	—	—	—	—	—		Cherry Kicks
"Jerk It Out"	2002	32	—	—	—	—	—	—	76	60	—		Love for the Streets
"Over 'fore It Started"	2002	56	—	—	—	—	—	—	—	—	—		Love for the Streets
"Candy Kane"	2002	—	—	—	—	—	—	—	—	—	—		Love for the Streets
"Get Off My Cloud"	2002	—	—	—	—	—	—	—	—	—	—		Non-album single
"Jerk It Out" (re-release)	2005	—	43	51	20	26	68	37	8	8	70	BPI: Platinum; RMNZ: Platinum	Paper Tigers
"We Got to Leave"	2005	46	—	—	—	—	—	—	—	—	—		Paper Tigers
"Paper Tigers"	2005	—	—	—	—	—	—	—	—	—	—		Paper Tigers
"It's Not the Fall That Hurts"	2005	—	—	—	—	—	—	—	—	—	—		Paper Tigers
"No Tomorrow" / "Every Road Leads to Home"	2007	—	—	—	—	—	—	—	—	—	—		Strawberry Weed
"No Tomorrow" / "Every Road Leads to Home"	2007	—	—	—	—	—	—	—	—	—	—		Strawberry Weed
"Boo Boo Goo Goo"	2008	—	—	—	—	—	—	—	—	—	—		Strawberry Weed
"—" denotes a recording that did not chart or was not released in that territory.
