= Paper Tigers =

Studio album by Caesars
- Released: 26 April 2005
- Recorded: 2001–2004
- Genre: Indie rock
- Length: 47:33
- Labels: Toshiba-EMI (Japan); VJCP 68748; Virgin CDVIR219 (UK); Astralwerks ASW 60828 (US)
- Producers: Joakim Åhlund, Michael H. Brauer

Caesars chronology
39 Minutes of Bliss (In An Otherwise Meaningless World) (2003)	Paper Tigers (2005)	Strawberry Weed (2008)

Singles from Paper Tigers
- 1. "We Got to Leave" Released: 2005; 2. "It's Not the Fall That Hurts" Released: 2005; 3. "Paper Tigers" Released: 2005

Paper Tigers is the fourth studio album by Swedish band Caesars, released on 26 April 2005. The album was released on Virgin in the United Kingdom, Astralwerks in the United States and Toshiba-EMI in Japan. The album contains the re-release of the song "Jerk It Out".

== Recording ==
Recording for Paper Tigers first began in the winter of 2003 at Silence Studio. The sessions then moved to Joakim Åhlund's Decibel Studio, in Stockholm. The album was mixed in New York by Michael Brauer.

== Track listing ==
All tracks are written by Joakim Åhlund unless otherwise noted.

No.	Title	Writer(s)	Length
1.	"Spirit"	Joakim Åhlund, Nino Keller	4:51
2.	"It's Not the Fall That Hurts"		2:49
3.	"Out There"	César Vidal	3:03
4.	"Jerk It Out"		3:17
5.	"May the Rain"		3:08
6.	"My Heart Is Breaking Down"	Max Group	2:35
7.	"Paper Tigers"		3:58
8.	"Your Time Is Near"		4:49
9.	"Throwaway"	Joakim Åhlund, César Vidal	2:49
10.	"Winter Song"		3:05
11.	"We Got to Leave"		3:23
12.	"Soul Chaser"		4:13
13.	"Good and Gone"		3:02
14.	"(I'm Gonna) Kick You Out (bonus track on certain editions)"		2:50

== Personnel ==
The following people contributed to Paper Tigers:

=== Caesars ===
- César Vidal – lead vocals, guitar
- Joakim Åhlund – audio production, guitar, vocals, mixing, producer
- Nino Keller – drums, vocals
- David Lindquist – bass guitar

=== Additional personnel ===
- Hector Araya – strings
- Chris Athens – mastering
- Michael Brauer – mixing
- Lasse Mårtén – engineer
- Kristoffer Nergårdh – piano
- Pontus Olsson – engineer
- Fredrik Wennerlund – photography
- Björn Yttling – Farfisa organ, phillycorda

== Reception ==
Professional ratings
Aggregate scores
Source	Rating
Metacritic	63/100
Review scores
Source	Rating
AllMusic	2.5/5 stars
Blender	4/5 stars
Entertainment Weekly	A
The Guardian	4/5 stars
Mojo	3/5 stars
NME	6/10
Pitchfork	4.9/10
PopMatters	5/10
Q	1/5 stars
Rolling Stone	3/5 stars

Paper Tigers has received mixed to positive reviews. On the review aggregate site Metacritic, the album has a 63 out of 100, indicating "generally favorable reviews".

David Browne of Entertainment Weekly gave the album an A grade, writing that the album was "one meaty, vigorous track after another of modern-Mersey-beat pop..." Browne concluded his review with: "All retro rock should sound this good." In another positive review, The Guardian's Dave Simpson wrote that Paper Tigers "is a treasure waiting to be found by the rest of us," and called the album "simultaneously ecstatic and melancholy."

On the other hand, AllMusic's Heather Phares criticized the album, writing that beyond "Jerk It Out", "It's Not the Fall That Hurts" and "Soulchaser", there were not many other memorable songs on the album. Stephen Haag of PopMatters also criticized the album's lack of memorable tracks, writing "If folks are purchasing Paper Tigers expecting a dozen more tunes like 'Jerk It Out'... they'll soon find that Caesars is guilty of bait-and-switch." In another mixed review, Marc Hogan of Pitchfork described the album as "...one or two decent singles surrounded by a bunch of mediocre-or-worse filler."

== Singles ==
- "We Got To Leave" - released 16 February 2005.
- "Jerk It Out" - released 18 April 2005 on Virgin Records in the UK

This single has been featured on iPod shuffle advertisements, the British television series "Teachers" and on the video games "FIFA Football 2004", SSX 3, and as downloadable content for Rock Band 3.

CD DINSD274: "Jerk It Out" / "The Longer We Stay Together"
"7" DINS274: "Jerk It Out" / "Up All Night"

== Charts ==
=== Album ===
Chart (2005)	Peak position
US Heatseekers	44

=== Singles ===
Year	Song	Peak positions			
Year	Song	UK	US Alt	US Adult Top 40	European Hot 100
2005	"We Got to Leave"	—	—	—	—
2005	"Jerk It Out"	8	40	38	20
"—" denotes releases that did not chart.
