= 39 Minutes of Bliss (In an Otherwise Meaningless World) =

Compilation album by Caesars
- Released: April 21, 2003
- Recorded: 1998–2002
- Genre: Rock
- Length: 38:08
- Labels: Virgin, Astralwerks
- Producers: Johan Forsman, Joakim Åhlund, Klas Åhlund

Caesars chronology
Love for the Streets (2002)	39 Minutes of Bliss (In an Otherwise Meaningless World) (2003)	Paper Tigers (2005)

Professional ratings
Review scores
Source	Rating
AllMusic	2.5/5 stars
Pitchfork	(3.9/10)

39 Minutes of Bliss (In an Otherwise Meaningless World), first released in 2003, is a compilation album by the Swedish band Caesars created especially for the American and British markets. The name of the song "Suzy Creamcheese" comes from the artwork of the Frank Zappa album Freak Out!.

== Track listing ==
All tracks are written by Åhlund, except where noted.

No.	Title	Length
1.	"Sort It Out"	3:36
2.	"(I'm Gonna) Kick You Out"	2:50
3.	"Let's Go Parking Baby"	2:34
4.	"Jerk It Out"	3:16
5.	"Out of My Hands" (Sanders) (Originally by The Endd)	3:37
6.	"Only You"	2:32
7.	"Since You've Been Gone"	3:15
8.	"Crackin' Up" (Vidal)	3:14
9.	"You're My Favourite" (Lundqvist-Vidal-Åhlund)	2:02
10.	"Fun and Games" (Byles-Perry)	2:22
11.	"Suzy Creamcheese" (Conway-Flores-Ralston)	4:03
12.	"You Don't Mean a Thing to Me"	4:37

=== Caesars ===
- César Vidal – lead vocals, guitar
- Joakim Åhlund – audio production, guitar, mixing, producer, vocals
- Nino Keller – drums, vocals
- David Lindquist – bass guitar
