= Behind the Music (album) =

Studio album by The Soundtrack of Our Lives
- Released: 12 February 2001 (Europe); 16 January 2002 (UK); 24 September 2002 (U.S.); 24 November 2003 (Australia)
- Recorded: Svenska Grammofonstudion and Music-A-Matic, Gothenburg, Sweden, 2000–2001
- Genre: Alternative rock, neo-psychedelia
- Length: 57:33
- Label: Telegram Records (Europe); Hidden Agenda/Universal (US); In-Fidelity Recordings (Australia)
- Producer: Ebbot Lundberg with Johan Forsman

The Soundtrack of Our Lives chronology
Extended Revelation... (1998)	Behind the Music (2001)	Origin Vol. 1 (2004)

Singles from Behind the Music
- 1. "Still Aging" Released: 2001; 2. "Nevermore" Released: 2001; 3. "Sister Surround" Released: 13 May 2002 (UK); 4. "21st Century Rip Off" Released: 9 September 2002 (UK)

Professional ratings
Review scores
Source	Rating
AllMusic	4/5 stars
The Boston Phoenix	3.5/4 stars
The Guardian	4/5 stars
Los Angeles Times	3/4 stars
NME	9/10
Pitchfork	3.0/10
Q	4/5 stars
Rolling Stone	3/5 stars
Spin	9/10

Behind the Music is the third album by the Swedish rock band The Soundtrack of Our Lives. It was originally released in Europe in February 2001, and subsequently around the world over the next two years. The album was the band's breakthrough record outside of their native Sweden, and was nominated for the Best Alternative Album award at the 2003 Grammy Awards. Among their newly found fans was Noel Gallagher, who proclaimed Behind the Music to be "the best album to come out in the last six years" and invited The Soundtrack of Our Lives to join on Oasis's UK and European tour in 2002.

The front cover features alginate masks of the faces of the six band members, cast by Swedish artists Per Svensson and Anna Strid. Svensson and the group's frontman Ebbot Lundberg had previously collaborated in an experimental sound and art project called 'Audio Laboratory'.

== Track listing ==
No.	Title	Music	Length
1.	"Infra Riot"	Ebbot Lundberg, Mattias Bärjed, Kalle Gustafsson Jerneholm	4:45
2.	"Sister Surround"	Lundberg, Bärjed	3:35
3.	"In Someone Else's Mind"	Lundberg, Bärjed	2:45
4.	"Mind the Gap"	Lundberg, Ian Person	4:21
5.	"Broken Imaginary Time"	Gustafsson Jerneholm	5:14
6.	"21st Century Rip Off"	Lundberg, Person	3:56
7.	"Tonight"	Lundberg, Martin Hederos	3:42
8.	"Keep the Line Movin'"	Lundberg, Person	2:47
9.	"Nevermore"	Lundberg, Bärjed, Björn Olsson	3:21
10.	"Independent Luxury"	Lundberg, Bärjed	3:59
11.	"Ten Years Ahead"	Lundberg, Bärjed	2:51
12.	"Still Aging"	Lundberg, Person	3:52
13.	"In Your Veins"	Lundberg, Person	4:22
14.	"The Flood"	Lundberg, Person	2:47
15.	"Into the Next Sun"	Lundberg, Bärjed	5:06
Total length:			57:33

=== Bonus Future Excerpts EP ===
1. "We're Gonna Get It Right" – 4:01
2. "Can't Control Myself" – 3:18
3. "Slow Drift Away" – 2:51
4. "Hang Ten" – 4:37
5. "We'll Get By" – 1:59
- This special limited edition bonus EP came bundled with the original release, and later appeared with special tour editions of the album in some territories. All five tracks of the EP also appeared on A Present from the Past.

== Personnel ==
- Mattias Bärjed – guitar, backing vocals, slide echoes and "additional instruments that makes us too pretentious to mention"
- Kalle Gustafsson Jerneholm – bass, backing vocals, double bass violin and cembalo
- Martin Hederos – piano, Mellotron, organ, backing vocals and string arrangement
- Ebbot Lundberg – lead vocals, sitar, harmonica and dulcimer
- Ian Person – guitar, backing vocals, percussion, Spanish sound effects and space slide
- Fredrik Sandsten – drums, percussion and spiritual guidance

=== Additional personnel ===
- Arpad Carlesäter – handclaps on "Independent Luxury"
- Eva-Tea Lundberg – horns
- Martin Wingate, John Löfgren, Märja Tokkola, Sigvard Järrebring and Kajsa Ivars – string quintet
- Peter Lundberg - pipes
- Salmaan Rasa – tablas on "Can't Control Myself"
