= Air Raid Serenades =

Compilation album by The Hellacopters
- Released: 21 August 2006
- Genre: Garage rock
- Label: Universal, Psychout Records, Wild Kingdom Records

The Hellacopters chronology
Rock & Roll is Dead (2005)	Air Raid Serenades (2006)	Head Off (2008)

Air Raid Serenades is a greatest hits compilation album by the Swedish garage rock band The Hellacopters, released in August 2006. The album includes tracks from all of the band's previous albums, in addition to songs that had previously appeared on the EPs Disappointment Blues and Strikes Like Lightning and other releases.

== Track listing ==
No.	Title	Originally appears on:	Length
1.	"(Gotta Get Some Action) Now!"	Supershitty to the Max!	3:16
2.	"Ferrytale"	Disappointment Blues	3:11
3.	"Born Broke"	Supershitty to the Max!	4:10
4.	"Soulseller"	Payin' the Dues	3:12
5.	"You Are Nothing"	Payin' the Dues	2:38
6.	"Like No Other Man"	Payin' the Dues	3:13
7.	"Long Gone Losers"	Disappointment Blues	2:45
8.	"Move Right out of Here"	Grande Rock	2:09
9.	"The Devil Stole the Beat from the Lord"	Grande Rock	3:53
10.	"Venus in Force"	Grande Rock	3:00
11.	"Down Right Blue"	"Down Right Blue" single	4:32
12.	"Crimson Ballroom"	"Crimson Ballroom" single	4:05
13.	"Hopeless Case of a Kid in Denial"	High Visibility	3:02
14.	"Toys and Flavors"	High Visibility	3:33
15.	"No Song Unheard"	High Visibility	4:00
16.	"By the Grace of God"	By the Grace of God	3:04
17.	"Carry Me Home"	By the Grace of God	3:41
18.	"It's Good But It Just Ain't Right"	By the Grace of God	2:51
19.	"Turn the Wrong Key"	Strikes Like Lightning	2:24
20.	"Everything's on T.V."	Rock & Roll Is Dead	3:14
21.	"I'm in the Band"	Rock & Roll Is Dead	3:18
22.	"Bring It on Home"	Rock & Roll Is Dead	4:42

== Personnel ==
- Nicke Andersson – guitar, vocals
- Jon Average – backing vocals
- Mattias Bärjed – acoustic guitar, backing vocals
- David Bianco – mixing
- Stefan Boman – engineer, mixing
- Olle Carlsson – photography
- Robert Dahlqvist – guitar, backing vocals
- Robert Eriksson – drums, backing vocals
- Janne Hansson – engineer
- Michael Ilbert – engineer, mixing
- Henrik Jonsson – mastering
- Chips K. – producer, engineer
- Anders Lind – engineer
- Anders Møller – percussion, engineer, mixing
- Scott Morgan – guitar, vocals
- Daniel Rey – guitar, engineer, mixing
- Knut Schreiner – guitar, engineer, mixing
- Tomas Skogsberg – engineer, mixing
