= Communion (The Soundtrack of Our Lives album) =

Studio album by The Soundtrack of Our Lives
- Released: 26 November 2008
- Recorded: Sweden, 2008
- Studio: Svenska Grammofon Studion
- Genre: Alternative rock
- Length: 93:32
- Label: Akashic Records, Yep Roc
- Producer: The Soundtrack of Our Lives

The Soundtrack of Our Lives chronology
A Present from the Past (2005)	Communion (2008)	Throw It to the Universe (2012)

Professional ratings
Review scores
Source	Rating
AllMusic	4.5/5 stars
NME	8/10 stars
Spin	4/5 stars

Communion is the fifth studio album by the Swedish band The Soundtrack of Our Lives.

The album is the band's longest to date at twenty-four tracks. After the decision was made to postpone the Origin Vol. 2 project, the band wrote entirely new material and recorded it, which became Communion.

== Release ==
Communion was first released on 26 November 2008 in Europe through Akashic Records. It was later issued digitally in North America on 6 January 2009, followed by a CD release on 3 March 2009 through Yep Roc Records.

== Track listing ==
=== CD 1 ===
No.	Title	Music	Length
1.	"Babel On"	Ebbot Lundberg, Mattias Bärjed	6:24
2.	"Universal Stalker"	Lundberg, Person	4:43
3.	"The Ego Delusion"	Lundberg, Bärjed	5:04
4.	"Pineal Gland Hotel"	Lundberg, Person	0:50
5.	"Ra 88"	Lundberg, Person	4:05
6.	"Second Life Replay"	Lundberg, Bärjed	5:24
7.	"Thrill Me"	Lundberg, Person	3:12
8.	"Fly"	Nick Drake	4:33
9.	"Pictures of Youth"	Lundberg, Bärjed	4:34
10.	"Mensa's Marauders"	Lundberg, Bärjed	2:22
11.	"Just a Brother"	Lundberg, Person	3:29
12.	"Distorted Child"	Lundberg, Bärjed	3:44

=== CD 2 ===
No.	Title	Music	Length
1.	"Everything Beautiful Must Die"	Kalle Gustafsson Jerneholm	4:50
2.	"The Fan Who Wasn't There"	Ebbot Lundberg, Mattias Bärjed	2:27
3.	"Flipside"	Lundberg, Anders Lindström, Bärjed	3:24
4.	"Lost Prophets in Vain"	Lundberg, Bärjed	3:35
5.	"Songs of the Ocean"	Lundberg, Bärjed	5:54
6.	"Digitarian Riverbank"	Person	2:59
7.	"Reconnecting the Dots"	Lundberg, Person	3:54
8.	"Without Warning"	Person, Lundberg	3:15
9.	"Utopia"	Lundberg, Bärjed	4:07
10.	"Saturation Wanderers"	Lundberg, Person	3:27
11.	"Lifeline"	Lundberg, Person	2:14
12.	"The Passover"	Lundberg, Bärjed	5:02

== Personnel ==
- Mattias Bärjed – guitar, backing vocals
- Kalle Gustafsson Jerneholm – bass, backing vocals
- Martin Hederos – piano, organ, backing vocals
- Ebbot Lundberg – lead vocals, autoharp
- Ian Person – guitar, backing vocals
- Fredrik Sandsten – drums, percussion

=== Additional personnel ===
- Simon Olsson – vocals on "Everything Beautiful Must Die" and "Utopia"
- Midaircondo – intro on "Babel On" and appearances in various places
- Nicola Boruvka – strings on "Songs of the Ocean" and "Lifeline"
- Lotte Lybeck – strings on "Songs of the Ocean" and "Lifeline"
- Karin Claesson – strings on "Songs of the Ocean" and "Lifeline"
- Paula Gustaffon-Apola – strings on "Songs of the Ocean" and "Lifeline"
- Stefan Sporsén – trumpet on "Fly" and "The Fan Who Wasn't There"
