= Throw It to the Universe =

Studio album by The Soundtrack of Our Lives
- Released: 18 April 2012
- Recorded: Svenska Grammofonstudion; Impressound Studio
- Genre: Alternative rock
- Length: 46:33
- Label: Parlophone, Yep Roc
- Producer: The Soundtrack of Our Lives

The Soundtrack of Our Lives chronology
Communion (2008)	Throw It to the Universe (2012)

Professional ratings
Aggregate scores
Source	Rating
Metacritic	80/100
Review scores
Source	Rating
AllMusic	3/5 stars
The A.V. Club	B+
PopMatters	6/10 stars

Throw It to the Universe is the sixth and final studio album by the Swedish band The Soundtrack of Our Lives.

One of the founding members of The Soundtrack of Our Lives, Björn Olsson, plays guitar and sings on three songs on the album. His photo can also be seen in the album credits.

== Release ==
Throw It to the Universe was released in Sweden on 18 April 2012 through Parlophone Music Sweden. It was issued in the United States on 26 June 2012 through Yep Roc Records.

== Track listing ==
No.	Title	Music	Length
1.	"Throw It to the Universe"	Ebbot Lundberg	3:44
2.	"You Are the Beginning"	Lundberg, Mattias Bärjed	5:03
3.	"When We Fall"	Lundberg, Person	4:11
4.	"Where's the Rock?"	Lundberg, Person	2:52
5.	"Freeride"	Lundberg, Bärjed	2:44
6.	"Waiting for the Lawnmowers"	Lundberg, Bärjed	1:29
7.	"Faster Than the Speed of Light"	Lundberg, Person	3:45
8.	"Reality Show"	Lundberg, Kalle Gustafsson Jerneholm	3:12
9.	"Busy Land"	Lundberg, Björn Olsson	2:31
10.	"If Nothing Lasts Forever"	Lundberg, Person	4:17
11.	"Solar Circus"	Lundberg, Person	3:59
12.	"What's Your Story?"	Lundberg, Person	3:59
13.	"Shine On (There's Another Day After Tomorrow)"	Lundberg, Olsson	4:42
Total length:			46:33

== Personnel ==
- Mattias Bärjed – guitar, backing vocals
- Kalle Gustafsson Jerneholm – bass, backing vocals
- Martin Hederos – piano, organ, violin, backing vocals
- Ebbot Lundberg – lead vocals, autoharp
- Ian Person – guitar, backing vocals
- Fredrik Sandsten – drums, percussion, backing vocals

=== Additional personnel ===
- Björn Olsson – guitar, backing vocals (on "Throw It to the Universe", "Busy Land" and "Shine On (There's Another Day After Tomorrow)")
