= Midaircondo =

Music duo

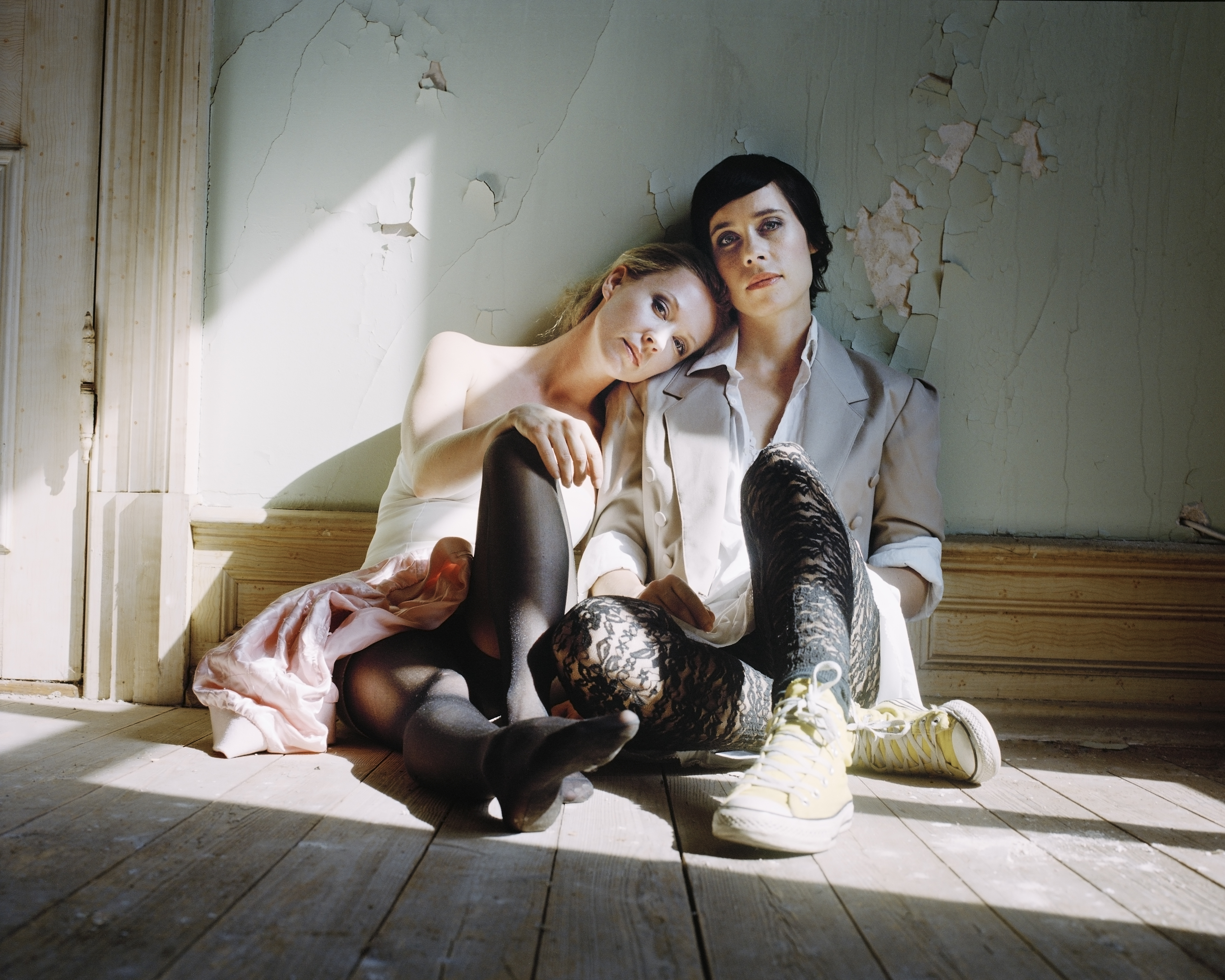

Background information
- Origin: Stockholm, Sweden
- Genres: Electronic
- Years active: 2003–2015
- Labels: Type Records; Twin Seed Recordings; Playground Scandinavia
- Members: Lisa Nordström; Lisen Rylander Löve

Midaircondo was a Swedish electronica duo consisting of Lisa Nordström and Lisen Rylander Löve, active 2003–2015.

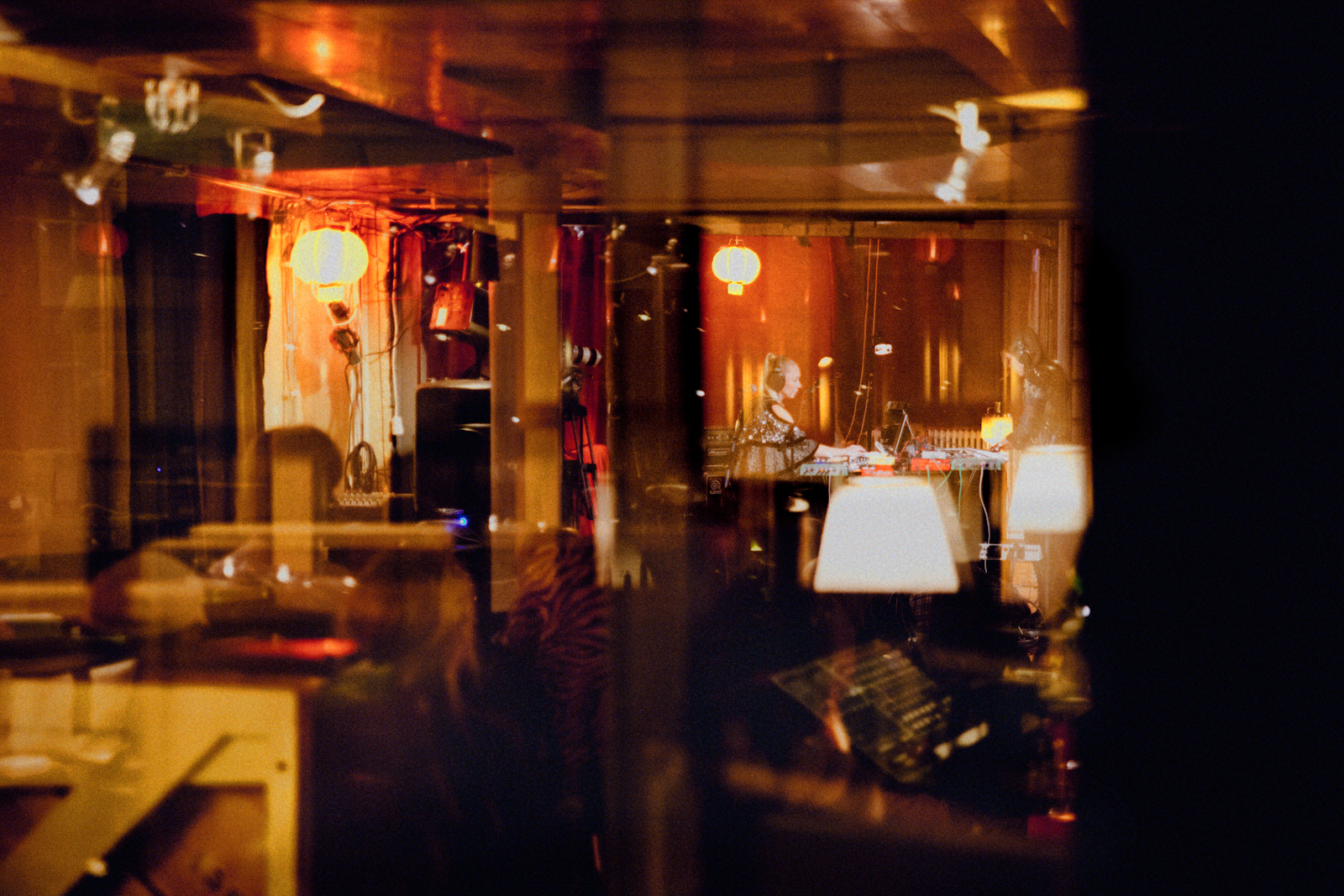

== Career ==
Since their formation in 2003, Midaircondo has released three albums, toured around Europe, Africa and South and North America. The duo has created and performed music for dance performances, theater, TV, radio and movies. Midaircondo are known for their improvised concerts with a mix of acoustic instruments, voice, electronics and video. The duo has performed at a number of international festivals such as Sónar (ES), Mutek Festival (CL), Molde Jazzfestival (NO) and Berlin Music Week (DE).

== Discography ==
=== Shopping For Images ===
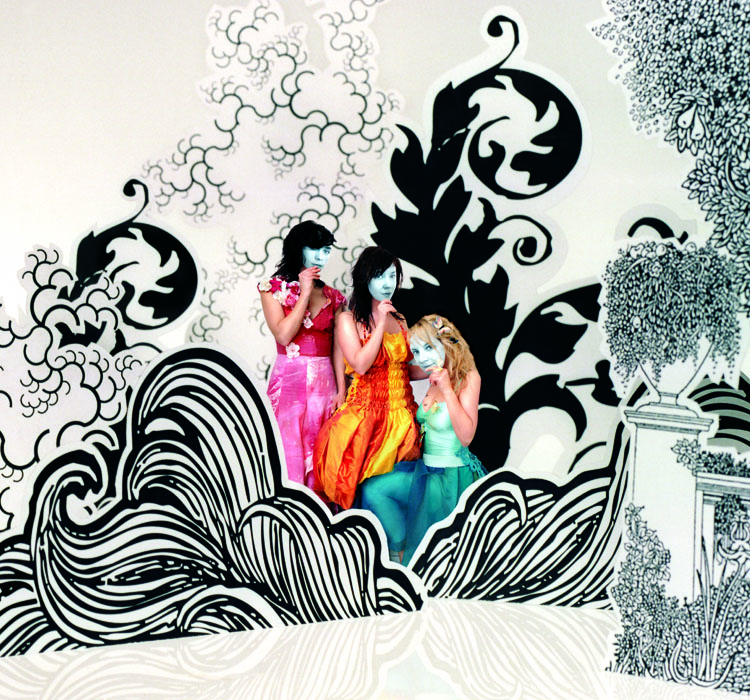

CD/2LP, Type Records, 2005

1. Eva Stern, Shake It
2. Could You Please Stop
3. Serenade
4. Coffeeshop
5. Sorry
6. Although I Heard
7. Perfect Spot
8. Who's Playing
9. Lo-Fi Love
10. She's So (LP only track)
11. Faces
12. I'll Be Waiting

==== Midaircondo ====
- Lisen Rylander – saxophone, vocals, kalimba, electronics
- Lisa Nordström – flute, vocals, kalimba, melodica, various pieces of glass and metals, electronics
- Malin Dahlström – vocals, finger cymbals, electronics

==== Additional musicians ====
- Per Störby – grand piano on Serenade
- Thomas Markusson – double bass on Could You Please Stop
- Andreas Tilliander – backing vocals on Perfect Spot
- Piano loop on Serenade from Shostakovich used with kind permission
- Recorded at Repeatle (sthlm) and REX (gbg)
- Mix by Midaircondo and Andreas Tilliander Mastered by Andreas Tilliander at Repeatle
- Nicklas Hultman – artwork
- Lisa Carlsson – cover and inside photo
- Maria Nordström – costume and concept for portrait photo
- Pontus Johansson – portrait photo of Midaircondo

=== Curtain Call ===
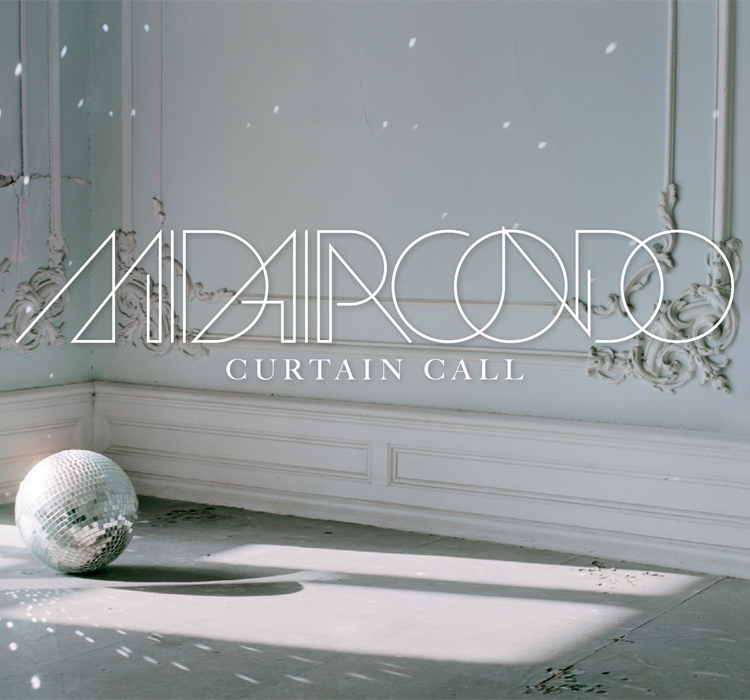

CD/LP, Twin Seed Recordings/Playground Scandinavia, 2009

1. Curtain Call
2. Come With Me
3. Reports On The Horizon
4. Below
5. Bringing Me Home
6. The Very Eye Of Night
7. Silk, Silver And Stone
8. Glowing Red
9. Stay
10. Revolve And Repeat
11. Venetian Veil

==== Midaircondo ====
- Lisa Nordström – vocals, bass flute, flute, zither, kalimba, percussion, electronics
- Lisen Rylander Löve – vocals, tenor sax, bass clarinet, kalimba, piano, percussion, electronics
- All music by Midaircondo
- Verse lyrics/melody on Silk, Silver and Stone by Ebbot Lundberg
- Ebbot Lundberg guest appearance courtesy of Akashic Records

==== Additional musicians ====
- Ebbot Lundberg – vocals (7)
- Chris Montgomery – drums (7,8)
- Livet Nord – violin (7)
- Emma Nordlund – cello (7)
- Johannes Lundberg – double bass (7)
- Petter Ericsson – double bass (3)
- Mika Takehara – drums and percussion (3,6)
- Thomas Markusson – double bass (9)
- Tracks 1, 3, 4, 5, 6, 10, 11 - recorded at Rex Studio by Midaircondo,
- Track 9 - recorded at Studio Epidemin by Johannes Lundberg,
- Tracks 2,7,8 - recorded at Rex Studio and Studio Epidemin by Midaircondo and Johannes Lundberg,
- Tracks 1, 2, 5, 6, 7, 8, 9, 10 - mixed by Christoffer Berg at My Sonic Mountain
- Tracks 3,11 - mixed by Paul Bothén at Element Studio
- Track 7 - vocal mix by Johan Forsman
- Produced by Midaircondo at Rex Studio Mastered by Andreas Tilliander at Repeatle
- Art direction and artwork – Ola Ingvarsson
- Photo – Ida Borg
- Hair and make up – Ida Andersson, Styling – Ida Borg and Ida Andersson

=== Reports On The Horizon ===
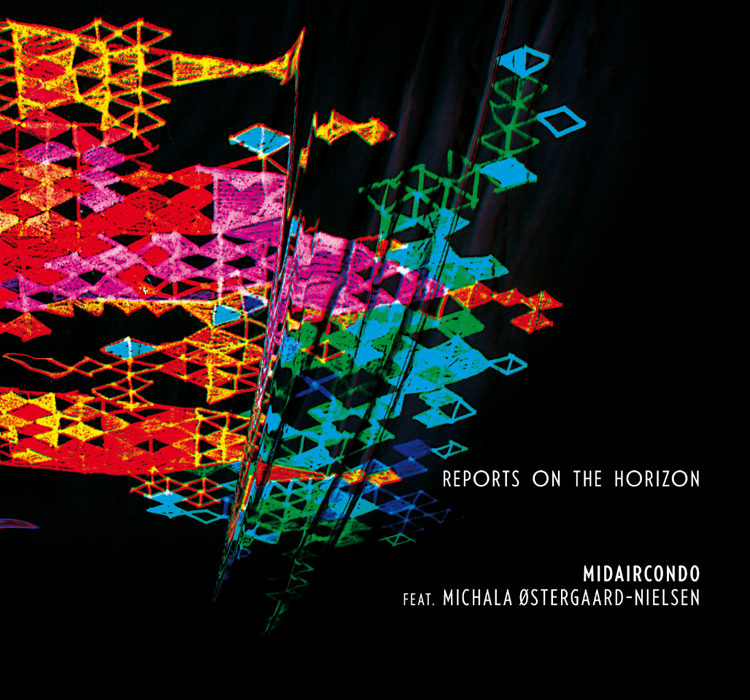

CD, Twin Seed Recordings/Playground Scandinavia, 2011

1. In The Neon Fruit Supermarket
2. The Zebra Crossing - Walking
3. The Zebra Crossing - Awaiting You
4. At The Rooftop
5. By The Rivulet
6. In A City Of Ships - Sounding
7. In A City Of Ships - At Long Last

==== Midaircondo ====
- Lisa Nordström – voice, bass flute, zither, electronics
- Lisen Rylander Löve – voice, tenor sax, bass clarinet, electronics
- Michala Østergaard-Nielsen – drums, percussion

Recorded live sessions at 2nd Long Street Studios in Göteborg, 28 Feb & 1 Mars 2011 by Petter Ericsson.

- Assistant engineer Mikael Enqvist.
- Mixed and mastered in Copenhagen by August Wanngren at We Know Music Studios.
- The Zebra Crossing mixed in Göteborg by Petter Ericsson at Studio Epidemin.
- All music by Midaircondo and Michala Østergaard-Nielsen.
- Illustration by Åsa-Hanna Carlsson
- Art work and cover design by Ola Ingvarsson

=== Appearances ===
- Monsters – Karin Inde (CD/DL, Ingrid Sounds, 2011) Midaircondo appear on the tracks Intro Of Burn and Burn.
- The Göteborg String Theory (2LP/2CD/DL Kning Disk, 2010) Midaircondo appear with the track Come With Me.
- The Soundtrack Of Our Lives – Communion (2LP/2CD, Akashic Records, 2008) Midaircondo appear on the track Babel On.
- Ström – Pausfågeln Remixad (CD, Container Recordings, 2006) Midaircondo appear with the track Rosenfink / For Scarlet.
- Do You Copy? (2CD, Mitek, 2006) Midaircondo appear with the track Talkuin2it.

== Collaborations and projects ==
Midaircondo has previously worked with artist such as Michala Østergaard-Nielsen, Adrian Belew, Ebbot Lundberg, The Göteborg String Theory, Quartiett String Quartet, brass musicians from Malmö Symfoniorkester and AlterEgo New Music Ensemble. In 2006, Swedish national TV (SVT) made a documentary about the group and Swedish Radio frequently broadcasts the group's live performances. Midaircondo has also created music for dance performances, theater, TV, radio and film. They have also toured in support of José González and The Soundtrack of our Lives.
