= Extended Revelation for the Psychic Weaklings of Western Civilization =

Extended Revelation for the Psychic Weaklings of the Western Civilization

Studio album by The Soundtrack of Our Lives
- Released: April 1998
- Recorded: Impress Sound Studio, Gothenburg, Sweden, 1997
- Genre: Alternative rock, neo-psychedelia
- Length: 61:39
- Label: Warner/Telegram
- Producer: The Soundtrack of Our Lives

The Soundtrack of Our Lives chronology
Welcome to the Infant Freebase (1996)	Extended Revelation for the Psychic Weaklings of the Western Civilization (1998)	Behind the Music (2001)

Professional ratings
Review scores
Source	Rating
Allmusic	4.5/5 stars

Extended Revelation for the Psychic Weaklings of the Western Civilization is the second studio album by the Swedish band The Soundtrack of Our Lives. It was the band's last Europe only release.

The album is made up of 50% material left over from their debut, Welcome to the Infant Freebase, and 50% new material. This record sees the band experimenting with darker and more psychedelic soundscapes.

The title of this album comes from the Rolling Stones Records' release of Brian Jones Presents the Pipes of Pan at Joujouka, where the inside liner notes state that "Western Civilization has made us such Psychic Weaklings"

== Track listing ==
No.	Title	Music	Length
1.	"Regenesis"	Kalle Gustafsson Jerneholm	2:56
2.	"Psychomantum X2000"	Ebbot Lundberg, Mattias Bärjed	6:31
3.	"Let It Come Alive"	Gustafsson Jerneholm	3:38
4.	"Interstellar Inferiority Complex"	Lundberg	1:45
5.	"Century Child"	Lundberg, Olsson	3:30
6.	"Safety Operation"	Lundberg, Olsson, Martin Hederos	2:46
7.	"Impacts & Egos"	Lundberg, Ian Person	5:36
8.	"Aqua Vera"	Olsson	1:16
9.	"From Gravity to Gold"	Lundberg, Olsson	3:53
10.	"So Far"	Lundberg, Person, Olsson	4:31
11.	"Serpentine Age Queen"	Lundberg, Person	2:24
12.	"Mega Society"	Lundberg	2:22
13.	"Black Star"	Lundberg, Olsson	5:15
14.	"Love Song # 3105"	Lundberg, Person	4:33
15.	"Jehovah Sunrise"	Lundberg, Olsson	4:28
16.	"All for Sale"	Lundberg, Olsson	6:07
Total length:			61:39

=== Bonus tracks on 2002 vinyl release ===
- "When Lighting Bugs Arrive"
- "Greatest Hit Providers"

== Singles ==
- "Black Star"

== Personnel ==
- Mattias Bärjed – guitar, backing vocals
- Kalle Gustafsson Jerneholm – bass, backing vocals
- Martin Hederos – piano, organ, backing vocals
- Ebbot Lundberg – lead vocals
- Ian Person – guitar, backing vocals
- Fredrik Sandsten – drums, percussion
