= Origin Vol. 1 =

Studio album by The Soundtrack of Our Lives
- Released: 18 October 2004 (Europe); 15 March 2005 (U.S.); 20 June 2005 (Australia)
- Recorded: Svenska Grammofon Studion, Gothenburg, Sweden, 2004
- Genre: Alternative rock
- Length: 52:14 (standard), 60:31 (US)
- Label: Telegram (Europe); Universal (U.S.); In-Fidelity (Australia)
- Producer: Johan Forsman, The Soundtrack of Our Lives

The Soundtrack of Our Lives chronology
| Behind the Music (2001) | Origin Vol. 1 (2004) | A Present from the Past (2005) |

Professional ratings
Review scores
| Source | Rating |
|---|---|
| AllMusic | 4/5 stars |
| Pitchfork Media | 4.8/10 |
| PopMatters | 6/10 |
| Rolling Stone | 2.5/5 stars |

Origin Vol. 1 (also referred to as Origin I) is an album by the Swedish band The Soundtrack of Our Lives. It was released in Europe in October 2004, and in the US in March 2005. Actor and singer Jane Birkin appears on the track "Midnight Children".

The song "Bigtime" was used as the official theme song for WrestleMania 21 and was later used in Gran Turismo 4 as part of the soundtrack. "Bigtime" was also used by Sky One in an advert for a new episode of Futurama. The song "Mother One Track Mind" was also used in Gran Turismo 4 as part of the soundtrack.

Singles from the album are "Bigtime", "Heading For a Breakdown" and "Believe I've Found".

== Album Imagery ==
The album's imagery consists of pictures of Asian ethnicities (like Turkmen and Chinese Mandarins) from the late 19th and early 20th century, with the band members' faces superimposed on top of them. These are seen on the album's front and back side, but also on some versions of the "Bigtime" single.

== Track listing ==
| No. | Title | Music | Length |
|---|---|---|---|
| 1. | "Believe I've Found" | Ebbot Lundberg, Mattias Bärjed | 3:27 |
| 2. | "Transcendental Suicide" | Lundberg, Ian Person | 6:16 |
| 3. | "Bigtime" | Lundberg, Bärjed | 4:05 |
| 4. | "Heading for a Breakdown" | Lundberg, Person | 4:02 |
| 5. | "Mother One Track Mind" | Lundberg, Bärjed | 3:44 |
| 6. | "Midnight Children" | Lundberg, Kalle Gustafsson Jerneholm | 4:39 |
| 7. | "Lone Summer Dream" | Lundberg, Person | 5:07 |
| 8. | "Royal Explosion (Part II)" | Lundberg, Bärjed | 3:19 |
| 9. | "Wheels of Boredom" | Lundberg, Bärjed | 2:52 |
| 10. | "Borderline" | Lundberg, Bärjed | 4:02 |
| 11. | "Song for the Others" | Lundberg, Martin Hederos | 3:47 |
| 12. | "Age of No Reply" | Lundberg, Bärjed, Mattias Hellberg | 6:50 |
| Total length: | | | 52:14 |

=== U.S. version bonus tracks ===
13. "To Somewhere Else" (also available on the "Heading for a Breakdown" single)
14. "World Bank" (also available on the "Bigtime" single)

== Personnel ==
- Mattias Bärjed – guitar, backing vocals
- Kalle Gustafsson Jerneholm – bass, backing vocals
- Martin Hederos – piano, organ, backing vocals
- Ebbot Lundberg – lead vocals, autoharp
- Ian Person – guitar, backing vocals
- Fredrik Sandsten – drums, percussion

=== Additional personnel ===
- Jane Birkin – vocals on "Midnight Children"
- Natacha Le Jeune – backing vocals on "Midnight Children"
- Simon Olsson – backing vocals on "Midnight Children"
- Stefan Sporsén – trumpet on "Lone Summer Dream"

== Charts ==
=== Weekly charts ===
| Chart (2004) | Peak position |
|---|---|
| Finnish Albums (Suomen virallinen lista) | 20 |
| Norwegian Albums (VG-lista) | 5 |
| Swedish Albums (Sverigetopplistan) | 1 |

=== Year-end charts ===
| Chart (2004) | Position |
|---|---|
| Swedish Albums (Sverigetopplistan) | 41 |
