= Strawberry Weed =

2008 studio album by Caesars

Studio album by Caesars
- Released: 8 March 2008
- Genre: Indie rock
- Length: 74:15
- Label: Dolores
- Producer: Ebbot Lundberg; Joakim Åhlund; N. Keller

Caesars chronology
Paper Tigers (2005)	Strawberry Weed (2008)

Professional ratings
Aggregate scores
Source	Rating
Metacritic	56/100
Review scores
Source	Rating
AllMusic	3/5 stars

Strawberry Weed is the fifth and final studio album by Swedish indie rock band Caesars. It is a double album and was released on 8 March 2008 via Dolores Recordings. The first single to be released from the record was "Boo Boo Goo Goo".

== Track listing ==
=== Disc 1 ===
1. "Fools Parade" – 3:48
2. "Waking Up" – 3:40
3. "She's Getting High" – 3:24
4. "Boo Boo Goo Goo" – 3:50
5. "Tough Luck" – 2:50
6. "Turn It Off" – 2:21
7. "You're Next" – 3:00
8. "In My Mind" – 3:08
9. "Crystal" – 2:46
10. "Every Road Leads Home" – 1:22
11. "Strawberry Weed" – 4:06
12. "Solina" – 2:59

=== Disc 2 ===
1. "New Breed" – 3:26
2. "Stuck with You" – 2:57
3. "Down Down Down" – 2:37
4. "No Tomorrow" – 3:52
5. "In Orbit" – 3:19
6. "Easy Star" – 2:59
7. "Up All Night" – 2:44
8. "Happy Happy" – 0:56
9. "Run No More" – 3:26
10. "Watching the Moon" – 3:14
11. "New Years Day" – 3:48
12. "You Nailed Me" – 4:00

== Personnel ==
- César Vidal – vocals
- Ebbot Lundberg – backing vocals, percussion
- David Lindqvist – bass
- Nino Keller – drums, vocals, keyboards
- Joakim Åhlund – guitar, vocals
- Björn Engelmann – mastering
- Jockum Nordström – artwork

== Charts ==
Chart performance for Strawberry Weed
Chart (2008)	Peak position
Swedish Albums (Sverigetopplistan)	16
