= Youth Is Wasted on the Young =

Youth Is Wasted on the Young may refer to:

- Youth Is Wasted on the Young (The Twelve Caesars album), 1998
- Youth Is Wasted on the Young (Scarlet Pleasure album), 2016
