= Jerk It Out =

2002 single by Caesars

- 2003 European single artwork

Single by Caesars

from the album Love for the Streets, Paper Tigers and 39 Minutes of Bliss
- B-side: "Crazy Chick"; "Can't Feel My Toes"; "Junebug"
- Released: 2002
- Genre: Garage rock; alternative rock
- Length: 3:16
- Label: Dolores; Virgin
- Songwriter: Joakim Åhlund
- Producer: Joakim Åhlund

Caesars singles chronology
"Fun 'n' Games" (2000)	"Jerk It Out" (2002)	"Over 'fore It Started" (2002)
"Jerk It Out" (2003)	"Jerk It Out" (2005)	"We Got to Leave" (2005)

"Jerk It Out" is a song by Swedish rock band Caesars. It was released in 2002 (when the band was known as Caesars Palace) as the lead single from their third studio album, Love for the Streets; it also appeared on the follow-up, Paper Tigers, in remixed form. The song was an international success following a re-release in 2005, reaching number eight on the UK Singles Chart and peaking at number 70 on the US Billboard Hot 100.

== Chart performance ==
The song was first released for radio airplay in Sweden in early 2002 and reached number 32 in Sweden at the start of April. The following year, the song made an appearance on the UK Singles Chart, at number 60. It was re-released on 8 April 2005 as a maxi-CD single and appeared on the band's album of that year, Paper Tigers. The re-release peaked at number eight on the UK Singles Chart, number 70 on the US Billboard Hot 100, and number 19 on the Billboard Dance/Mix Show Airplay chart.

== Track listings ==
=== 2002–2003 ===
Swedish CD single

1. "Jerk It Out"
2. "Crazy Chick"
3. "Can't Feel My Toes"
4. "Junebug"

UK 7-inch single

A. "Jerk It Out"
B. "The Cannibals"

UK CD single

1. "Jerk It Out"
2. "Out of My Hands"
3. "She's a Planet"

=== 2005 ===
UK and European CD single

1. "Jerk It Out"
2. "The Longer We Stay Together"

UK 7-inch single

A. "Jerk It Out" – 3:15
B. "Up All Night" – 3:30

Australian CD single

1. "Jerk It Out"
2. "Jerk It Out" (New Brauer mix)
3. "The Longer We Stay Together"

== Charts ==
=== Weekly charts ===
Chart (2002–2006)	Peak position
Australia (ARIA)	43
Austria (Ö3 Austria Top 40)	51
Canada Hot AC Top 30 (Radio & Records)	22
Europe (Eurochart Hot 100)	20
France (SNEP)	26
Germany (GfK)	68
Ireland (IRMA)	37
Scottish Singles Sales (Official Charts)	8
Sweden (Sverigetopplistan)	32
Switzerland (Schweizer Hitparade)	76
UK Singles (Official Charts)	8
US Billboard Hot 100	70
US Adult Pop Airplay (Billboard)	36
US Alternative Airplay (Billboard)	40
US Dance Airplay (Billboard)	19

=== Year-end charts ===
Chart (2005)	Position
UK Singles (OCC)	107

== Certifications ==
Region	Certification	Certified units/sales
New Zealand (RMNZ)	Platinum	30,000^{‡}
United Kingdom (BPI)	Platinum	600,000^{‡}
^{‡} Sales+streaming figures based on certification alone.

== Release history ==
Region	Date	Format(s)	Label(s)	Ref.
Sweden	2002	CD	Dolores; Virgin	
United Kingdom	7 April 2003	7-inch vinyl; CD	Dolores; Virgin	
United States	28 April 2003	Triple A; alternative radio	Astralwerks	
United States (re-release)	14 March 2005	Hot AC; triple A; alternative radio	Astralwerks	
Australia	11 April 2005	CD	EMI Music Australia	
United States	12 April 2005	Contemporary hit radio	Astrakwerks	
United Kingdom (re-release)	18 April 2005	7-inch vinyl; CD	Dolores; Virgin	

== Use in media ==
The song's appearance on charts was helped by prolific use in mid-2000s media, including commercials for the iPod Shuffle, Mobiltel, Nivea, and Coca-Cola (in South Africa and Indonesia), as well as a 2009 Renault Mégane spot. Furthermore, it was used in the video games Dance Dance Revolution SuperNova (arcade and PlayStation 2 versions), FIFA Football 2004, FIFA 23, Just Dance, LMA Manager, Rock Band 3 (as downloadable content), Samba de Amigo (downloadable content for the Wii version), and SSX 3.

The song was part of the soundtrack of many films, including The Benchwarmers; Captivity; Deuce Bigalow: European Gigolo; Fun with Dick and Jane; and Yours, Mine and Ours. It featured in trailers for Knight and Day, The Pink Panther, and Garfield Gets Real, while the remix of the song was used in the trailer for Clerks II.

The song was used in the car sketch in the Eddsworld short "Random Bits".

The song was included in the TV series Dawson's Creek, the CBS series Cold Case, the NBC series Las Vegas, the HBO series Entourage, NCIS, and the British series Teachers.

In 2017, it was sampled by rapper Tiggs Da Author in his song "Work It Out".

In 2020, the song was used to introduce the character Dani Rojas in episode 6 of the TV series Ted Lasso.

In 2025, the song was used in the trailer for the SpongeBob SquarePants Netflix movie, Plankton: The Movie.
