= Youth Is Wasted on the Young (The Twelve Caesars album) =

Studio album by The Twelve Caesars
- Released: 1998
- Genre: Rock
- Length: 42:23
- Label: Minty Fresh
- Producer: Klas Åhlund

The Twelve Caesars chronology
| Youth Is Wasted on the Young (1998) | Cherry Kicks (2000) |

Youth Is Wasted on the Young is the debut studio album by Swedish rock band the Twelve Caesars.

== Track listing ==
All tracks are written by Joakim Åhlund, except where noted.

| No. | Title | Writer(s) | Length |
|---|---|---|---|
| 1. | "Sort It Out" | | 3:37 |
| 2. | "Let's Go Parking Baby" | | 2:36 |
| 3. | "I'm Gonna Kick You Out" | | 2:52 |
| 4. | "You're My Favourite" | Lyrics: The Twelve Caesars; Music: Åhlund | 2:03 |
| 5. | "My Abduction Love" | | 3:50 |
| 6. | "Optic Nerve" | Lyrics: César Vidal; Music: Åhlund | 3:51 |
| 7. | "The Cannibals" | | 3:00 |
| 8. | "Anything You Want" | | 2:54 |
| 9. | "She's a Planet" | | 2:25 |
| 10. | "Suzy Creamcheese" (Originally by Teddy and His Patches) | David Conway, Teddy Flores, Jerry Ralston | 4:05 |
| 11. | "You Are My Favourite 2" | | 2:52 |
| 12. | "You Don't Mean a Thing to Me" | | 4:36 |

== Personnel ==
Personnel taken from Youth Is Wasted on the Young liner notes.

The Twelve Caesars

- César Vidal – lead vocals
- Joakim Åhlund – guitar, backing vocals
- David Lindqvist – bass
- Jens Örjenheim – drums

Guest musicians

- David Nyström – Farfisa organ
- Erik Olsson – tambourine, maracas
- Bjorn Olsson – guitar solo on "My Abduction Love"
- Klas Åhlund – all acoustic guitars (except "You Are My Favourite 2"

Production

- Klas Åhlund – production, recording, mixing
- Joakim Åhlund – co-production, mixing
- Pierre Lindsjöö – assistant engineer
- David Möllerstedt – mixing
- Jockum Nordström – cover art
- Frederick Skogqvist – photos

== Charts ==
| Chart (1998) | Peak position |
|---|---|
| Swedish Albums (Sverigetopplistan) | 59 |
