= A Present from the Past =

Compilation album by The Soundtrack of Our Lives
- Released: 7 December 2005
- Genre: Alternative rock
- Label: Telegram Records
- Producer: The Soundtrack of Our Lives

The Soundtrack of Our Lives chronology
Origin Vol. 1 (2004)	A Present from the Past (2005)	Communion (2008)

Professional ratings
Review scores
Source	Rating
AllMusic	4.5/5 stars

A Present from the Past is a compilation album of non-album tracks by the Swedish rock band The Soundtrack of Our Lives.

The album consists of tracks from B-sides and out of print EPs, as well as previously unreleased material.

== Track listing ==
=== CD 1 ===
No.	Title	Music	Length
1.	"Dog Days" (Previously unreleased)	Ebbot Lundberg, Mattias Bärjed	1:37
2.	"Galaxy Gramophone"	Lundberg, Björn Olsson	4:13
3.	"Can't Control Myself"	Lundberg, Ian Person	3:19
4.	"Infinite Zero" (Previously unreleased)	Lundberg, Johan Johansson	3:50
5.	"The New Messiah" (Previously unreleased)	Lundberg, Bärjed	3:47
6.	"Nobrainer" (Alternate version)	Lundberg, Person	5:15
7.	"Side Effects" (Previously unreleased)	Lundberg, Person	4:07
8.	"Not Kinda Worried"	Lundberg, Bärjed	2:48
9.	"It Ain't Free (Living in a Bubble)" (Alternate version)	Lundberg, Person	3:24
10.	"When Lightning Bugs Arrive"	Lundberg, Olsson, Person	4:41
11.	"To Somewhere Else" (Alternate version)	Lundberg, Bärjed	3:31
12.	"We'll Get By" (Alternate version)	Lundberg, Bärjed	2:01
13.	"Avenger Hill Street Blues" (Single version)	Lundberg, Person	3:33
14.	"News to the World"	Lundberg, Martin Hederos, Person	5:41
15.	"Playstation Bordello"	Kalle Gustafsson Jerneholm	2:50
16.	"Cleaning Session Raga"	Lundberg	1:27

=== CD 2 ===
No.	Title	Music	Length
1.	"Dow Jones Syndrome"	Lundberg, Bärjed	4:18
2.	"A Room Without a View" (Alternate version)	Lundberg, Olsson	3:28
3.	"Everyday Preacher" (Previously unreleased)	Lundberg, Gustafsson Jerneholm	3:58
4.	"Greatest Hit Providers"	Lundberg, Olsson	4:06
5.	"Blind Date" (Previously unreleased)	Lundberg, Bärjed	1:43
6.	"James Last Experience"	Lundberg, Hederos, Person	3:29
7.	"Tarde Sed Tute" (Previously unreleased)	Person	1:37
8.	"Hang Ten"	Lundberg, Person	4:38
9.	"Lost Highway"	Lundberg, Person	4:35
10.	"Pass Through Fear" (Previously unreleased)	Lundberg, Bärjed	3:47
11.	"Four Ages (Part I)"	Lundberg, Olsson	3:56
12.	"Slow Drift Away"	Lundberg, Gustafsson Jerneholm	2:52
13.	"Still Get Around" (Previously unreleased)	Lundberg, Bärjed	4:16
14.	"We're Gonna Get It Right"	Lundberg, Bärjed	4:02
15.	"World Bank"	Gustafsson Jerneholm	4:46
16.	"Retired Teenage Angst"	Lundberg, Olsson	1:38
