= No Science =

- Origin: Stockholm, Sweden
- Genres: Electronic
- Years active: 2003–present
- Labels: BLVVD
- Members: Johan Skugge; Jukka Rintamäki
- Website: noscience.se

No Science is an electronic music duo composed of Swedish producers and composers Johan Skugge and Jukka Rintamäki. They are best known for composing the soundtrack of the first-person shooter video games Battlefield 3 and Battlefield 4.

== History ==
Jukka Rintamäki is an artist who has worked as a bassist, singer and songwriter of the band Silverbullit from Gothenburg. Johan Skugge was previously in the band Yvonne. The two formed the duo No Science in 2010 and used a combination of synth, drum machine and steel guitar. They have been working together since creating the music for the computer game Battlefield 3 in 2010. They also composed the soundtrack for the sequel, Battlefield 4. The duo's debut single as No Science, Magnificent Arp was released in late 2013. In February 2015 the single "Bits" was released featuring a remix by Swedish artist Jay-Jay Johanson. No Science's first album Lucky Resident was released in March 2015, and includes an appearance by El Perro del Mar.

== Discography ==
=== Albums ===
- Lucky Resident (2015)

=== Singles ===
- "Familiar Skies" (2015)
- "Bits" (2015)
- "Magnificent Arp" (2013)
