= Love for the Streets =

Studio album by Caesars Palace
- Released: 22 April 2002
- Studio: Rub-a-Dub (Stockholm)
- Genre: Indie rock
- Length: 33:49
- Label: Virgin 7243 812203 2 0 Dolores 7243 812203 2 0
- Producer: Joakim Åhlund

Caesars Palace chronology
Cherry Kicks (2000)	Love for the Streets (2002)	39 Minutes of Bliss (In An Otherwise Meaningless World) (2003)

Love for the Streets is the third studio album by Swedish rock band Caesars Palace.

== Track listing ==
No.	Title	Writer(s)	Length
1.	"Over 'fore It Started"	Joakim Åhlund	2:50
2.	"Candy Kane"	Åhlund	2:36
3.	"Mine All of the Time"	César Vidal	2:04
4.	"Let My Freak Flag Fly"	Åhlund	2:35
5.	"Cheap Glue"	Vidal; Åhlund	2:22
6.	"Jerk It Out"	Åhlund	3:14
7.	"Burn the City Down"	Åhlund	4:09
8.	"Do-Nothing"	Vidal	2:06
9.	"I Gun for You, Part II"	Vidal	0:55
10.	"Fifteen Minutes Too Late"	Åhlund	1:53
11.	"She Don't Mind"	Vidal; Åhlund	2:10
12.	"I Gun for You"	Vidal; Åhlund	3:39
13.	"Black Heart"	Åhlund	1:28
14.	"Thousand-Mile-Stare"	Åhlund	1:41

== Credits ==
Credits taken from Love for the Streets liner notes.

Caesars Place

- César Vidal – vocals
- Joakim Åhlund – guitar, vocals
- David Lindqvist – bass
- Nino Keller – drums

Additional musicians

- Björn Yttling – Farfisa organ (1, 4, 7), Silvertone (4, 7)
- Rolf Nilsson – strings (5)
- Marcin Pospieszalski – string (5)
- Konstantin Pospieszalski – strings (5)
- Holger Koehler – tablas (14)

Technical personnel

- Joakim Åhlund – producer, mixing
- Fabian "Phat Fabe" Torsson – co-producer, mixing, additional engineer
- The Internal Dread – engineer (all except 11)
- Pierre Carnbrandt – engineer (11)
- Johan Forsman – additional engineer
- Björn Engelmann – mastering
- Jockum Nordström – sleeve concept

== Charts ==
=== Weekly charts ===
Weekly chart performance for Love for the Streets
Chart (2002)	Peak position
Swedish Albums (Sverigetopplistan)	3

=== Year-end charts ===
2002 year-end chart performance for Love for the Streets
Chart (2002)	Position
Swedish Albums (Sverigetopplistan)	36
