= Mattias Bärjed =

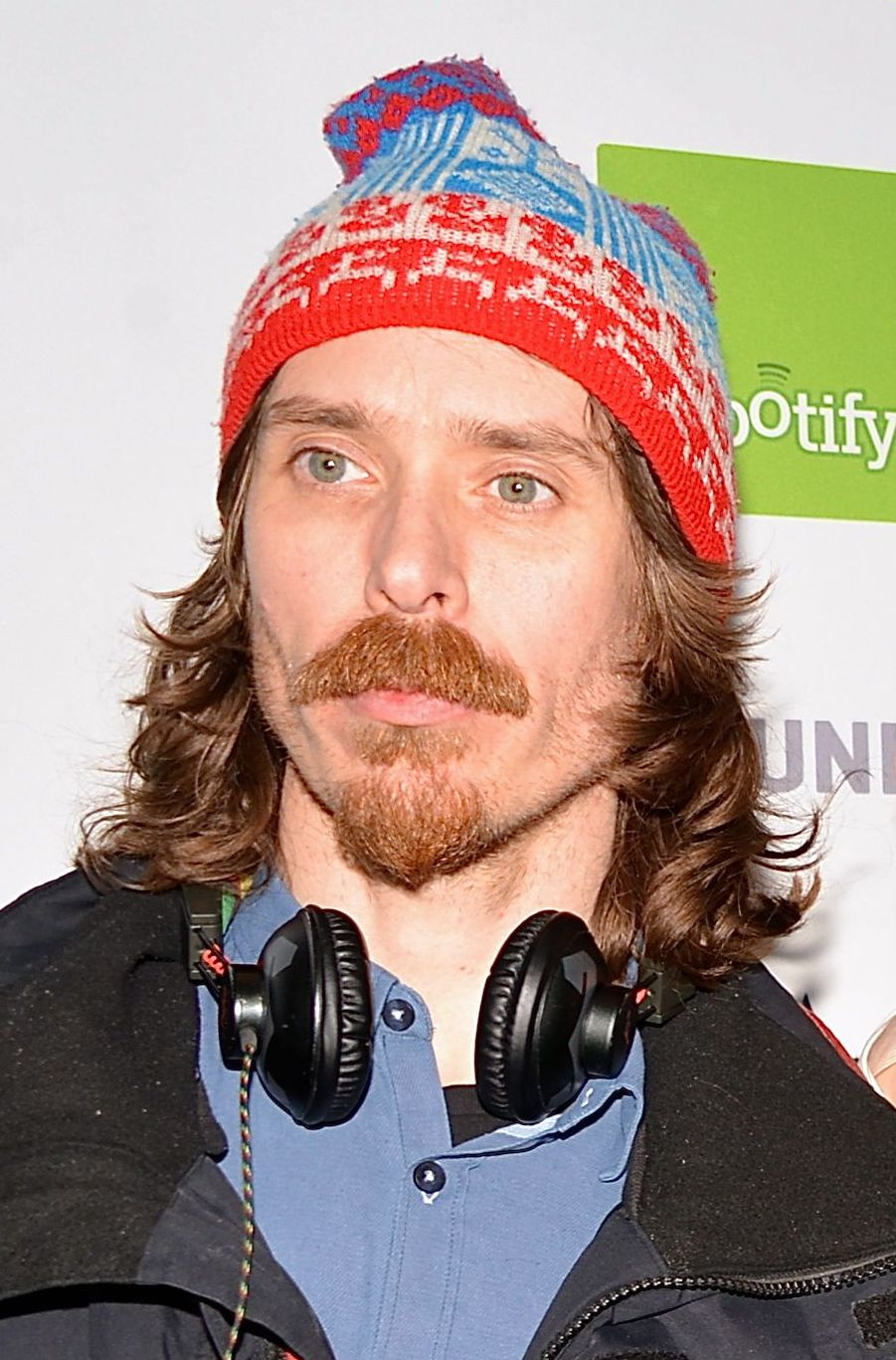
- Mattias Bärjed in 2013

Background information
- Born: 21 May 1973 (age 53); Karlstad, Sweden
- Genres: Alternative rock, psychedelic rock, garage rock, experimental music
- Occupations: Guitarist, musician, songwriter
- Years active: 1986–present
- Member of: The Soundtrack of Our Lives
- Formerly of: Free Fall, Nymphet Noodlers, Mindjive, Refused

Tore Mattias Bärjed (born 21 May 1973) is a Swedish musician, songwriter and music composer. Between 1997–2012, and again since 2023, he was a guitarist for The Soundtrack of Our Lives, co-writing many of their songs, such as "Sister Surround", "Bigtime" and "Second Life Replay". Since around 2007 Bärjed has been active as a film music composer, and in 2015 he received the Guldbaggen award for his soundtrack to the film Gentlemen.

== Biography ==
=== Background ===
When Bärjed was four or five years old, he wanted to be Randy Bachman. Before he focused on music, he played football in Råtorp's IK's junior team. During 1988–91 he drew comics in comics fanzines such as Fizzo and VälArt, collaborations with fellow cartoonist David Liljemark (who provided story lines, sometimes also inking). The fanzine Seriechock No. 5 (June 1991) published the only interview Bärjed did as a comics artist.

By then, he had already been in local bands such as Ants of the Underground (1987), Christ Couldn't Come (1989–90) and Pretty Green (1991). Later, he joined members from another Karlstad band, Ugly Jake, to form Nymphet Noodlers, which was Bärjed's first major band, which also released records. He then joined Mindjive during 1995–97.

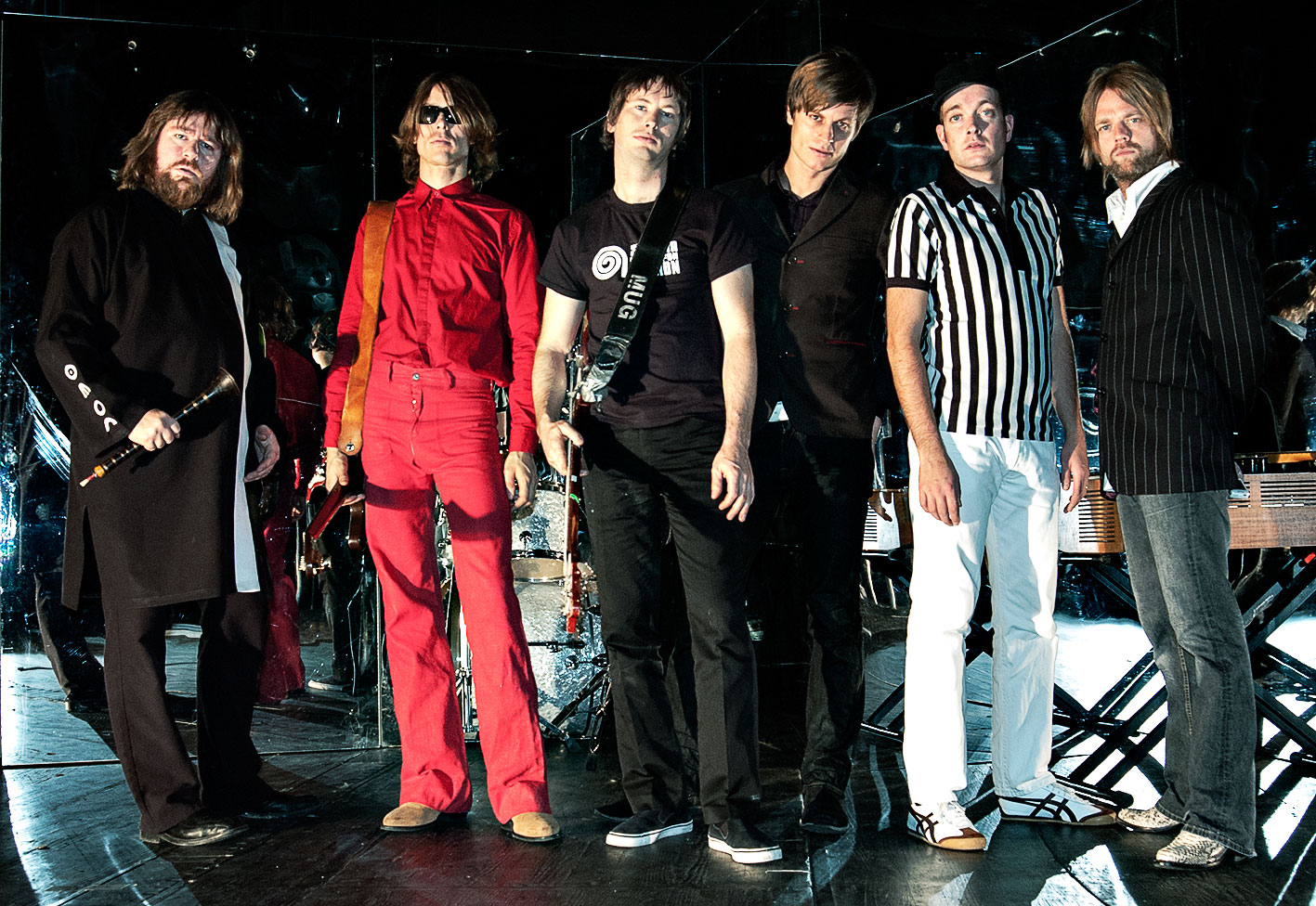
Mattias (2nd from left), as a member of The Soundtrack of Our Lives, 2004

=== Career as a guitarist ===
Mattias Bärjed is probably mostly known for being one of the guitar players of the Swedish rock band The Soundtrack of Our Lives, which he was a part of from March 1997 (replacing founding member Björn Olsson) to the band's amicable break-up in 2012.

In 2009, Bärjed started the band Free Fall with Jan Martens from Nymphet Noodlers, Ludwig Dahlberg from The (International) Noise Conspiracy and Kim Franson. Their debut single "Power And Volume" was released by Nuclear Blast in 2012, and the following year saw the European release of a full-length album by the same name. Among the main influences for Free Fall, Bärjed has mentioned "The Stooges, The Who, AC/DC, Led Zeppelin, Van Halen, Deep Purple, The Beatles, Motörhead." He has also described Free Fall's music as "Freedom rock".

Over the years Bärjed has been working as a session or concert guitarist for a whole string of Swedish rock bands and artists, including The Hellacopters and Håkan Hellström. He played guitar on Broder Daniel's last gig on 8 August 2008.

Since spring 2015, he plays guitar in the hardcore band Refused. The band broke up in 2025.

=== Composer of film music ===
In later years Mattias Bärjed has started a solo career as a film score composer. He wrote and performed most of the music to Peter Birro's television series Upp till kamp (2007), directed by Michael Marcimain. Bärjed also acted as "Anders", a member of the band featured in the film. In 2012 Bärjed composed the music to Marcimain's feature film debut Call Girl (2012).

In 2015 Bärjed and Jonas Kullhammar shared the Guldbaggen award for best soundtrack, for their work on Gentlemen, based upon the novel by Klas Östergren. The soundtrack to the film also got a nomination to the Grammis award (jazz category).

Bärjed's collaboration with Marcimain has continued with "Jakten på en mördare" (The Hunt for a Killer, 2020) and "Händelser vid vatten" (Blackwater, 2023).

=== Private life ===
Mattias Bärjed has lived in Visby since 2014 . He grew up in the Karlstad suburb Skåre, but later lived for many years in Gothenburg and Stockholm.

== Discography ==
=== Nymphet Noodlers ===
- Nymphet Noodlers – Impeccable Selection (EP, 1993)
- Nymphet Noodlers – "The Sea" (single, 1994)
- Nymphet Noodlers – Going Abroad (album, 1994. Expanded re-release as a 2-LP, 2021)

=== The Soundtrack of Our Lives ===
- The Soundtrack of Our Lives - Welcome to the Infant Freebase (album, 1996)
- The Soundtrack of Our Lives – Extended Revelation for the Psychic Weaklings of Western Civilization (album, 1998)
- The Soundtrack of Our Lives – Gimme Five (EP, 2000)
- The Soundtrack of Our Lives – Behind the Music (album, 2001)
- The Soundtrack of Our Lives – Origin Vol. 1 (album, 2004)
- The Soundtrack of Our Lives – A Present from the Past (double album, 2005. Compilation of EP tracks, B-sides and outtakes)
- The Soundtrack of Our Lives – Communion (double album, 2008)
- The Soundtrack of Our Lives – Golden Greats No. 1 (compilation, 2010)
- The Soundtrack of Our Lives – Throw It to the Universe (album, 2012)
- The Soundtrack of Our Lives – Shine On (EP, 2012)

=== Solo (film music) ===
- Mattias Bärjed – Upp till kamp (soundtrack, double album, 2007)
- Mattias Bärjed – Familjen Babajou (soundtrack, digital release, 2009)
- Mattias Bärjed – Himlen är oskyldigt blå (soundtrack, digital release, 2010)
- Mattias Bärjed – Call Girl (soundtrack, album, 2012)
- Mattias Bärjed – Gentlemen (soundtrack, double album, 2014)
- Mattias Bärjed – Gentlemen & Gangsters (soundtrack, digital release, 2016)
- Mattias Bärjed – Liberty (soundtrack, digital release, 2018)
- Mattias Bärjed – Jakten på en mördare (The Hunt For A Killer) (soundtrack, digital release, 2020)
- Mattias Bärjed – Händelser vid vatten (Blackwater) (soundtrack, digital release, 2023)

=== Free Fall ===
- Free Fall – Power And Volume (single, 2012)
- Free Fall – Power And Volume (album, 2013)

=== Refused ===
- Refused – War Music (album, 2019)
- Refused – The Malignant Fire (EP, 2020)
- Refused – Born On The Outs (EP, 2020)

=== Other ===
- Dundertåget – Skaffa ny frisyr (album, 2009. Producer)
- The Hellacopters – Grande Rock (album, 1999. Acoustic guitar and backing vocals)
- The Hellacopters – High Visibility (album, 2000. Acoustic and electric guitar)
- The Hellacopters – By the Grace of God (album, 2002. Acoustic and electric guitar)
- The Hellacopters – Rock & Roll Is Dead (album, 2005. Acoustic guitar)
- Håkan Hellström – För sent för Edelweiss (album, 2007. Guitar)
- Håkan Hellström – 2 steg från Paradise (album, 2010. Guitar)
- Mindjive – "Package Design" (single, 1996)
- Mindjive – Chemicals (album, 1996)
- Thunder Express – Republic Disgrace (album, 2007. Producer)

== Awards ==
- 2008 – Gyllene Draken (The Golden Dragon) for his soundtrack to the Upp till kamp tv series
- 2015 – The Guldbaggen award for best soundtrack, for Gentlemen. (award shared by Bärjed and Jonas Kullhammar)
