= Rock & Roll Is Dead =

Studio album by The Hellacopters
- Released: 6 June 2005
- Recorded: February 2005
- Genre: Garage rock, punk rock, garage punk
- Length: 40:22
- Label: Universal AB, Universal International, Wild Kingdom, Liquor and Poker Music, Sacred Heart Recordings
- Producer: Chips K.

The Hellacopters chronology
Cream of the Crap Vol. 2 (2004)	Rock & Roll Is Dead (2005)	Air Raid Serenades (2008)

Professional ratings
Review scores
Source	Rating
AllMusic	3.5/5 stars
Pitchfork	5.5/10 stars
The Aquarian	Positive
Rolling Stone	3/5 stars

Rock & Roll Is Dead is the sixth studio album released by the Swedish rock band The Hellacopters. The first edition of the CD came with a 25-minute bonus DVD entitled Poking at the Stiff and chronicled the second of the two weeks of recording the album. The vinyl release had seven different colors of the vinyl: brown, green, white, clear, orange, red and black. There was also picture disc from Sacred Heart Recordings available in a limited run of 200 units with the inner sleeve artwork printed on the vinyl and the songs "It Might Mean Something To You" and "Positively So Naive" as bonus tracks.

The track "I'm in the Band" is available as a bonus song in the game Guitar Hero III: Legends of Rock, while the track "Bring It on Home" is featured on the soundtrack of the game NHL 07.

== Track listing ==
All tracks are written by Nicke Andersson, except where noted.

No.	Title	Writer(s)	Length
1.	"Before the Fall"	Nicke Andersson, Kenny Håkansson	2:11
2.	"Everything's on T.V."		3:14
3.	"Monkey Boy"		2:38
4.	"No Angel to Lay Me Away"	Andersson, Robert Dahlqvist, Håkansson, Anders Lindström	3:55
5.	"Bring It On Home"		2:11
6.	"Leave It Alone"		4:00
7.	"Murder on My Mind"	Andersson, Håkansson	3:10
8.	"I'm in the Band"	Andersson, Dahlqvist	3:19
9.	"Put out the Fire"	Andersson, Håkansson	3:08
10.	"I Might Come See You Tonight"		3:24
11.	"Nothing Terribly New"		2:59
12.	"Make It Tonight"		2:44
13.	"Time Got No Time to Wait for Me"		3:28

== Personnel ==
The Hellacopters

- Nicke Andersson – Vocals guitars, piano, percussion
- Robert Dahlqvist – Guitars, vocals
- Kenny Håkansson – Bass guitar
- Anders Lindström – Organ, piano, guitar, backing vocals
- Robert Eriksson – Drums, backing vocals

Additional musicians

- Pelle Almqvist – Howl
- Linn Segolsson – Backing vocals
- Clarisse Muvemba – Backing vocals
- Mattias Bärjed – Acoustic guitar
- Johan Bååth – Hand claps

Production

- Chips Kiesbye – Producer, engineer
- Michael Ibert – Engineer
- Janne hansson – Engineer
- Henrik Johnsson – Mastering
