= Welcome to the Infant Freebase =

Studio album by The Soundtrack of Our Lives
- Released: March 1996
- Recorded: Impress Sound, Gothenburg, Sweden, summer of 1995
- Genres: Alternative rock, neo-psychedelia
- Length: 70:12
- Label: Warner/Telegram
- Producer: The Soundtrack of Our Lives

The Soundtrack of Our Lives chronology
Welcome to the Infant Freebase (1996)	Extended Revelation for the Psychic Weaklings of Western Civilization (1998)

Professional ratings
Review scores
Source	Rating
AllMusic	4/5 stars
Stereo & Video	4/5 stars

Welcome to the Infant Freebase is the debut album by the Swedish rock band The Soundtrack of Our Lives.

The album was originally conceived as a double album, but their record company disagreed.

It includes the singles "Instant Repeater '99", "Blow My Cool", "Mantra Slider", and "Firmament Vacation (A Soundtrack of Our Lives)", and the song "Instant Repeater '99" was used for the closing credits of the movie Spun.

The vinyl release of this record also includes the tracks from the Homo Habilis Blues EP.

== Track listing ==
No.	Title	Music	Length
1.	"Mantra Slider"	Ebbot Lundberg, Björn Olsson	6:38
2.	"Firmament Vacation (A Soundtrack of Our Lives)"	Lundberg, Olsson	4:39
3.	"Underground Indian"	Lundberg, Olsson	4:03
4.	"Chromosome Layer"	Lundberg	2:57
5.	"Instant Repeater '99"	Lundberg, Ian Person, Björn Olsson	4:42
6.	"Embryonic Rendezvous"	Kalle Gustafsson Jerneholm	4:12
7.	"Four Ages (Part II)"	Lundberg, Olsson	3:56
8.	"Grand Canaria"	Lundberg, Olsson	2:39
9.	"Endless Song"	Lundberg, Person	4:08
10.	"Confrontation Camp"	Lundberg, Olsson	4:55
11.	"Blow My Cool"	Lundberg, Olsson	2:31
12.	"Senior Breakdown"	Olsson	0:27
13.	"Bendover Babies"	Lundberg, Olsson	2:45
14.	"The Homo Habilis Blues"	Lundberg, Person, Olsson	3:00
15.	"For Good"	Lundberg, Olsson	2:47
16.	"Magic Muslims"	Lundberg, Olsson, Person	2:30
17.	"Rest in Piece"	Lundberg, Olsson	3:21
18.	"Retro Man"	Lundberg, Johan Johansson	5:31
19.	"Theme from Hållö"	Olsson	1:28
20.	"Legend in His Own Mind"	Lundberg, Olsson	2:53
Total length:			70:12

== Personnel ==
- Kalle Gustafsson Jerneholm – bass, backing vocals, lead vocals on "Embryonic Rendezvous"
- Martin Hederos – piano, organ, backing vocals
- Ebbot Lundberg – lead vocals
- Björn Olsson – guitar, backing vocals
- Ian Person – guitar, backing vocals
- Fredrik Sandsten – drums, percussion

=== Additional personnel ===
- Peter Lundberg – pipes on "Mantra Slider" and "Magic Muslims"
- Annika Modigh – backing vocals on "Bendover Babies"
- Julia Larsson – tambourine on "Magic Muslims"
- Marcus Westerlind – backing vocals on "Blow My Cool"
