= Cherry Kicks =

Cherry kicks

Studio album by Caesars Palace
- Released: 2000
- Genre: Noise rock
- Length: 40:06
- Label: Virgin
- Producer: Klas Åhlund, Johan Forsman & Joakim Åhlund

Caesars Palace chronology
Youth Is Wasted on the Young (1998)	Cherry kicks (2000)	Love for the Streets (2002)

Cherry Kicks is the second studio album by Swedish rock band Caesars Palace.

== Track listing ==
1. "Right About Time" – 2:50
2. "Subhuman Girl" – 2:31
3. "Crackin' Up" – 3:14
4. "One Good Night" – 4:04
5. "Spill Your Guts" – 2:47
6. "Since You've Been Gone" – 3:15
7. "Oh Yeah?" – 3:12
8. "Punkrocker" – 6:20
9. "Fun & Games" – 2:23 (Originally by Junior Byles)
10. "From the Bughouse" – 2:51
11. "Only You" – 2:33
12. "Cherry Kicks" – 4:00
