= Silverbullit =

- Origin: Gothenburg, Sweden
- Genres: Alternative rock, post-punk, noise pop
- Years active: 1995–present

Silverbullit is a Swedish rock band based in Gothenburg.

== History ==
Formed in 1995 under the name "Silverbullet", which was changed after a conflict over the rights for the name. They are known under the name Citizen Bird in the US, and toured under that name and released their album Citizen Bird as a "self-titled" LP there in order to avoid trademark confusion with an American rapper. The band plays synth-influenced rock music. Amongst others, sources of inspiration are DAF, Depeche Mode, New Order and The Stooges, as well as video game music. The group was nominated for a Grammis for Best Rock Act. Their album Arclight was announced to be the best Swedish album of 2004 by a vote of music reviewers., but have not yet made a real popular break-through.

They have done numerous festival gigs and have also toured together with The Soundtrack of Our Lives, to whom they are sometimes compared. Lead singer Simon Ohlsson is usually very wild and erratic on stage and several performances have gone awry. For example, early in the band's career, a gig in Varberg ended with Simon being dragged away by police who thought he was on drugs; and at Rookiefestivalen 2004 he jumped out into the sparse crowd and was thrown out from the venue by a security guard, while the rest of the band kept playing.

== Members ==
- Simon Ohlsson (vocals, keyboards)
- Jon Ölmeskog (keyboards)
- Andreas Nilsson (guitars)
- Jukka Rintamäki (bass, vocals)
- Anders Gustafsson (drums)

== Discography ==
=== Albums ===
- Silverbullit (1997)
- Citizen Bird (2001)
- Arclight (2004)

=== Singles ===
- "King of the line"
- "Star"
- "Magnetic city"
- "Run"
