= FIFA Football 2004 =

2003 video game

- Cover with (left to right) Juventus's Alessandro Del Piero, Arsenal's Thierry Henry and Barcelona's Ronaldinho
- Developers: EA Canada, Exient Entertainment (GBA/N-Gage)
- Publisher: EA Sports
- Series: FIFA
- Platforms: Windows Consoles: PlayStation PlayStation 2 GameCube Xbox; Handheld: Game Boy Advance N-Gage Mobile phone
- Release: PAL: 24 October 2003; NA: 4 November 2003; JP: 18 March 2004; Game Boy Advance, Windows: NA: 4 November 2003; PAL: 7 November 2003; N-Gage: PAL: 24 December 2003; NA: 14 January 2004; Mobile: NA: 13 August 2004
- Genre: Sports (football)
- Modes: Single-player, multiplayer

FIFA Football 2004, also known as FIFA Soccer 2004 in North America, is a football simulation video game developed by EA Canada and published by Electronic Arts. It was released in October 2003 with the tagline "Create Brilliance".

FIFA Football 2004 is the eleventh game in the FIFA series.

== Gameplay ==
While not adding much to the engine used in FIFA Football 2003, the biggest new inclusions were secondary divisions, which allow the player to take lower ranked teams to promotion attempts. Gameplay has a new feature dubbed "Off the ball", which allows the control of two players at the same time for greater tactical play. Another key feature was Football Fusion, which allows owners of both FIFA 2004 and Total Club Manager 2004 to play games from the management sim in FIFA. The title sequence was filmed in St James' Park, home of Newcastle United, with the opening song being Kings of Leon's European hit "Red Morning Light".

== Reception ==
Reception

Aggregate scores
Aggregator	Score						
Aggregator	GBA	GameCube	N-Gage	PC	PS	PS2	Xbox
GameRankings	84.20%	83.67%	73.60%	78%	80%	81.74%	82.50%
Metacritic	82/100	83/100	72/100	77/100	80/100	84/100	82/100

Review scores
Publication	Score						
Publication	GBA	GameCube	N-Gage	PC	PS	PS2	Xbox
Electronic Gaming Monthly	N/A	8.17/10	N/A	N/A	N/A	8.17/10	8.17/10
Eurogamer	N/A	N/A	N/A	N/A	N/A	8/10	N/A
Game Informer	N/A	8.25/10	N/A	N/A	N/A	8.5/10	N/A
GamePro	N/A	4.5/5	N/A	N/A	N/A	4.5/5	4.5/5
GameRevolution	N/A	B	N/A	N/A	N/A	B	B
GameSpot	N/A	8.4/10	6.7/10	7.8/10	N/A	8.6/10	8.4/10
GameSpy	N/A	3/5	3/5	N/A	N/A	3/5	3/5
GameZone	8/10	N/A	N/A	N/A	8/10	8.6/10	N/A
IGN	8.5/10	8.3/10	N/A	8.5/10	N/A	8.5/10	8.3/10
Nintendo Power	3.8/5	4.4/5	N/A	N/A	N/A	N/A	N/A
Official U.S. PlayStation Magazine	N/A	N/A	N/A	N/A	N/A	5/5	N/A
Official Xbox Magazine (US)	N/A	N/A	N/A	N/A	N/A	N/A	9.2/10
PC Gamer (US)	N/A	N/A	N/A	79%	N/A	N/A	N/A

The PlayStation 2 version of FIFA Football 2004 received a "Double Platinum" sales award from the Entertainment and Leisure Software Publishers Association (ELSPA), indicating sales of at least 600,000 copies in the United Kingdom.

The game was met with positive to average reception. GameRankings and Metacritic gave it a score of 84.20% and 82 out of 100 for the Game Boy Advance version; 83.67% and 83 out of 100 for the GameCube version; 82.50% and 82 out of 100 for the Xbox version; 81.74% and 84 out of 100 for the PlayStation 2 version; 80% and 80 out of 100 for the PlayStation version; 78% and 77 out of 100 for the PC version; and 73.60% and 72 out of 100 for the N-Gage version.
