= Ebbot Lundberg =

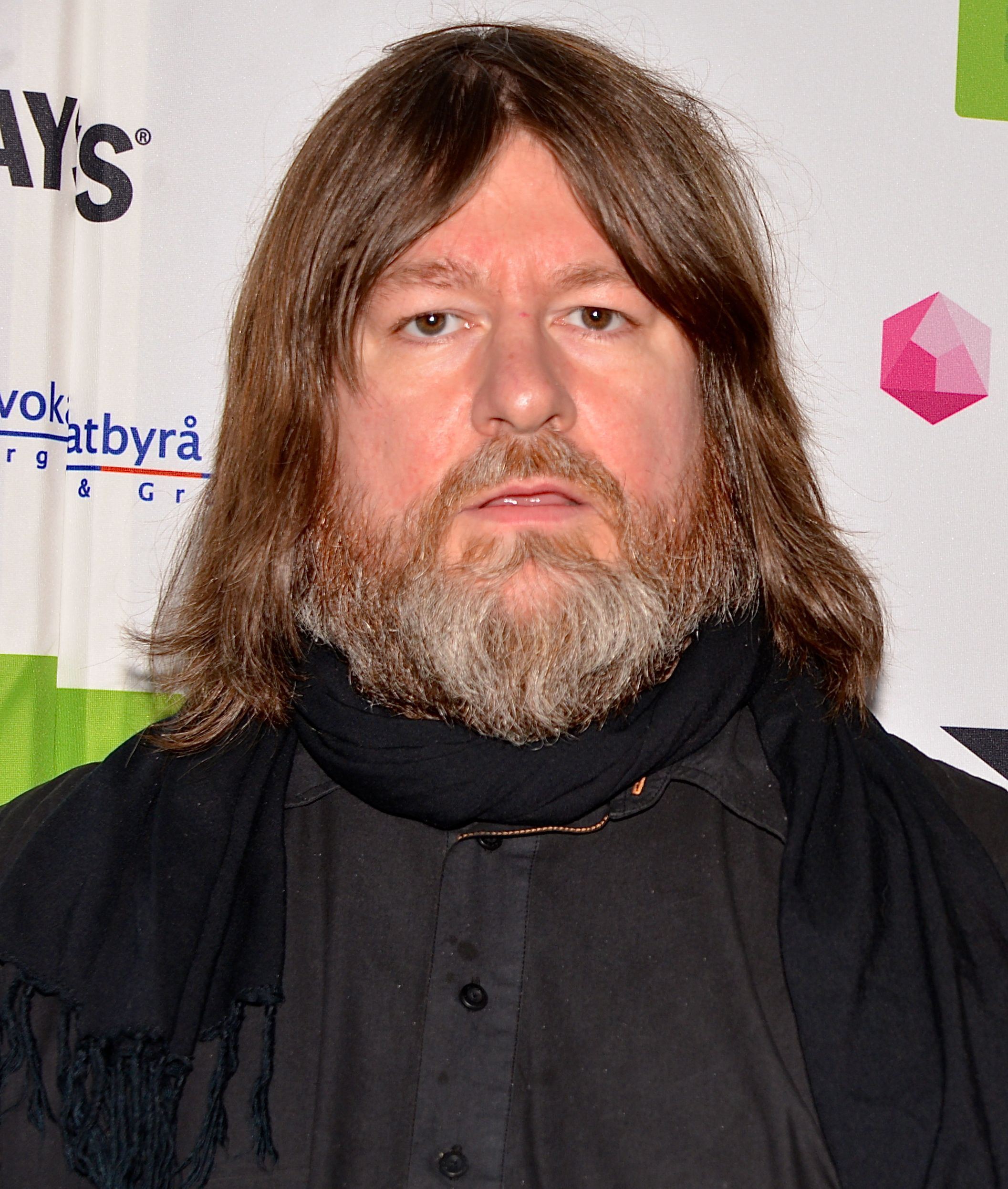
- Ebbot Lundberg

Background information
- Also known as: Ebbot
- Born: Torbjörn Lundberg; 26 February 1966 (age 59); Västerås, Sweden
- Genres: Rock; Alternative rock Psychedelic rock Garage rock Experimental music
- Occupations: Singer, musician, songwriter
- Years active: 1981–present
- Labels: Telegram Records, Universal Music, Radium 226.5, MNW, In-Fidelity Recordings

Torbjörn "Ebbot" Lundberg (born 26 February 1966 in Västerås) is a Swedish artist, songwriter and music producer who lives in Gothenburg, Sweden. From 1995 to 2012, he was the lead singer of The Soundtrack of Our Lives‚ which he co-founded with Björn Olsson and Ian Person. Lundberg was one of the founding members of the rock band Union Carbide Productions that was active 1986–1993. He has also worked as a producer a large number of bands like The Loons, Nymphet Noodlers, Nicolai Dunger, Onkel Kånkel, and Zoobox. He has made appearances or collaborated with Jane Birkin, Turbonegro, Nina Persson, The Cardigans, Teddybears, Trummor & Orgel and Olle Ljungström. He has appeared on the Late Show with David Letterman, Late Night with Conan O'Brien, Later... with Jools Holland and The Tonight Show with Jay Leno.

In 2012 he released his first solo album entitled There's Only One of Us Here. It is a 43-minute long, uninterrupted opus that was originally created in 2011 for the art project (In)Visible Dialogues organized by Per Hüttner and Elias Arnér.

== Discography ==
=== Solo albums ===
- 2012: There's Only One of Us Here (Kning Disk)
- 2013: On The Other Side Of Light (Subliminal Sounds), with The New Alchemy including artist Per Svensson. (Per Svensson)
- 2016: For the Ages to Come (Akashic Records), with The Indigo Children.

=== With The Soundtrack of Our Lives ===
- 1996: Welcome to the Infant Freebase (Telegram Records)
- 1998: Extended Revelation for the Psychic Weaklings of Western Civilization (Telegram Records)
- 2001: Behind the Music (Telegram Records)
- 2004: Origin Vol. 1 (Telegram Records)
- 2008: Communion (Telegram Records)
- 2012: Throw It to the Universe (Telegram Records)

=== With Union Carbide Productions ===
- 1987: In the Air Tonight (Radium Records)
- 1989: Financially Dissatisfied, Philosophically Trying (Radium Records)
- 1991: From Influence to Ignorance (Radium Records)
- 1992: Swing (Radium Records)

=== With 5 Billion in Diamonds ===
- 2017: 5 Billion in Diamonds (100% Records)
- 2020: Divine Accidents (Make Records)
