= Joakim Åhlund =

Swedish musician (born 1970)

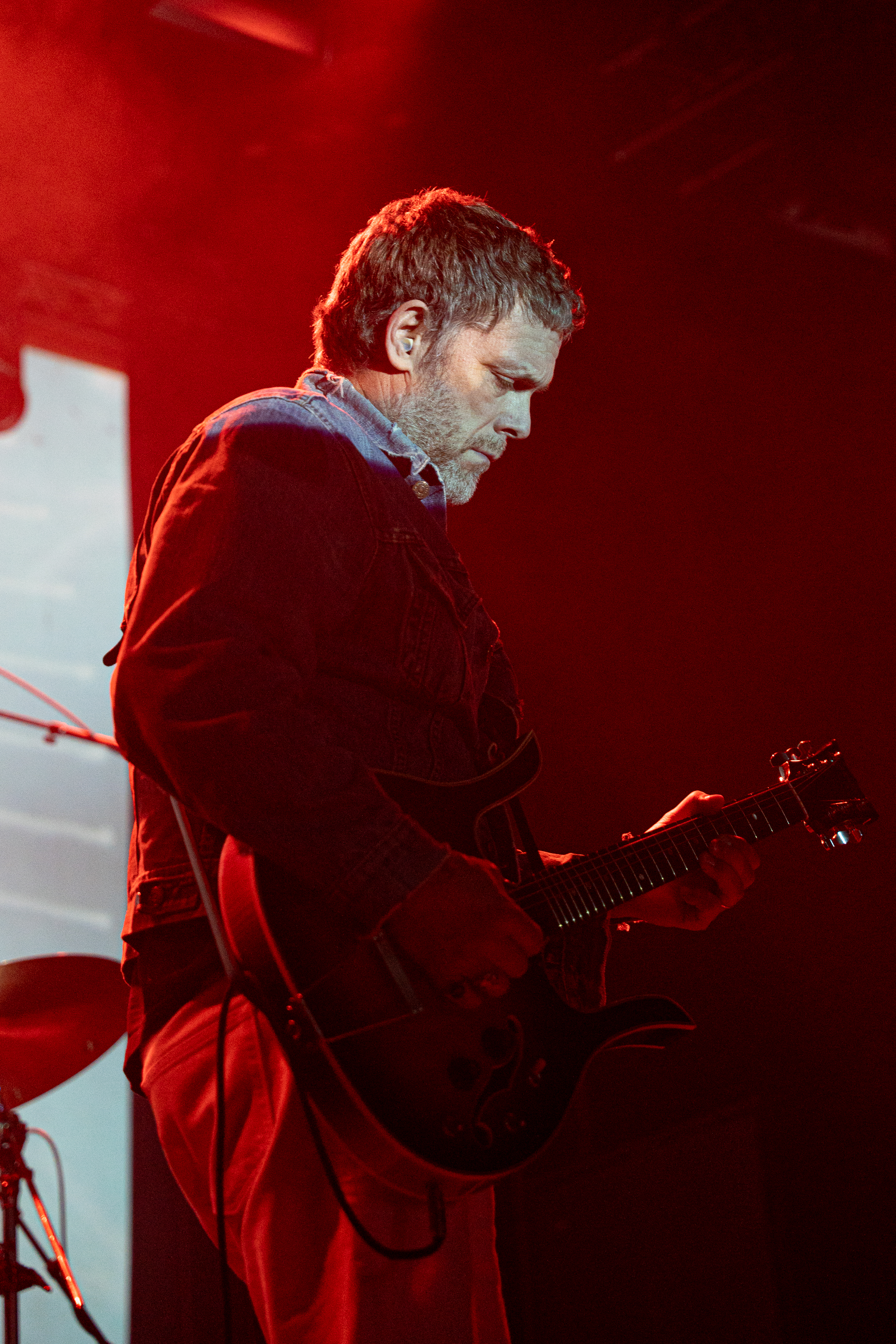
- Åhlund performing with Les Big Byrd in 2025

Background information
- Also known as: Jocke Åhlund
- Born: Frans Joakim Åhlund; 9 August 1970 (age 56); Stockholm, Sweden
- Occupations: Musician; songwriter; producer; music video director
- Instruments: Guitar; vocals
- Member of: Caesars; Teddybears; Smile; Les Big Byrd

Frans Joakim Åhlund (born 9 August 1970) is a Swedish musician, producer and music video director. He was the lead guitarist of the band Caesars and a member of the bands Teddybears, Smile and Les Big Byrd.

Åhlund is older brother of musician and Teddybears member Klas Åhlund, film producer Johannes Åhlund, and illustrator Anna Åhlund. He was raised in Bagarmossen in Stockholm.

== Producer and songwriter ==
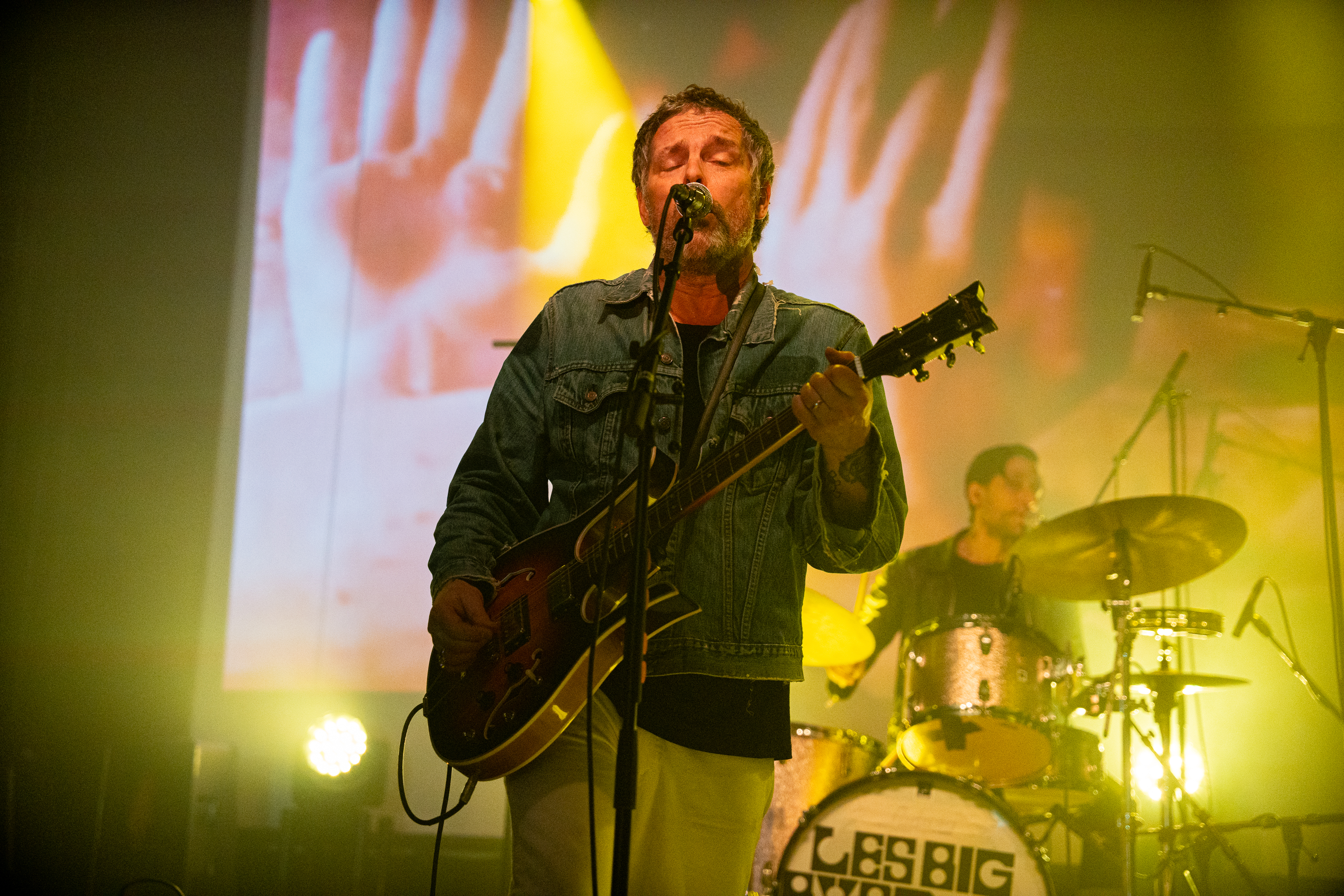
Åhlund performing with Les Big Byrd in Dresden, Germany in 2025

Aside from his artist career, Åhlund is also a songwriter and music producer. He has written and produced a number of international artists, such as Giorgio Moroder, Cheryl Cole (her UK #1 song "I Don't Care"), Charli XCX, Robyn and Petite Meller (whose debut album he produced). Other collaborations include Sia, CeeLo Green, Theophilus London, The Brian Jonestown Massacre, Iggy Pop and songwriters Bonnie McKee and Wayne Coyne. He also produced the two albums För sent för Edelweiss and 2 steg från Paradise by Swedish artist Håkan Hellström.

He collaborated with Chrissie Hynde on her 2014 debut solo album Stockholm, co-writing two of the songs with Hynde, playing guitar, producing, and providing background vocals.

Åhlund has also directed the music videos of "I'll Be Gone" and "When We Were Winning" by Broder Daniel, "New Noise" by Refused and "Black Mask" by The (International) Noise Conspiracy. He is also one of the co-founders of artist collective and record label Ingrid, with Lykke Li, Peter Bjorn & John, Christian Kalsson, and Pontus Winnberg, among others.

In 2014, Åhlund collaborated with Black Market Karma on two tracks, "Heady Ideas" and "War in the Streets", which were released as an LP in 2023, Friends In Noise.
