= The Soundtrack of Our Lives =

Swedish rock band

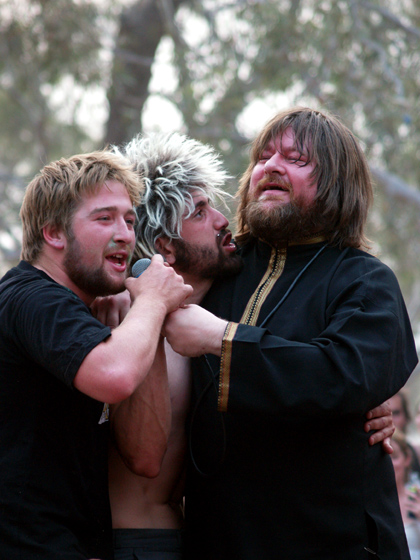
- Singer Ebbot Lundberg (right) in the crowd with two fans at the Meredith Music Festival, December 2006

Background information
- Origin: Gothenburg, Sweden
- Genres: Alternative rock, neo-psychedelia
- Years active: 1995–2012, 2023–Present
- Labels: Telegram Records (Europe); Universal Music (USA); In-Fidelity Recordings (Aus) Haldern Pop Recordings (Germany, Switzerland, Austria)
- Members: Fredrik Sandsten; Martin Hederos; Ebbot Lundberg; Mattias Bärjed; Kalle Gustafsson Jerneholm; Ian Person
- Past members: Björn Olsson
- Website: Official website

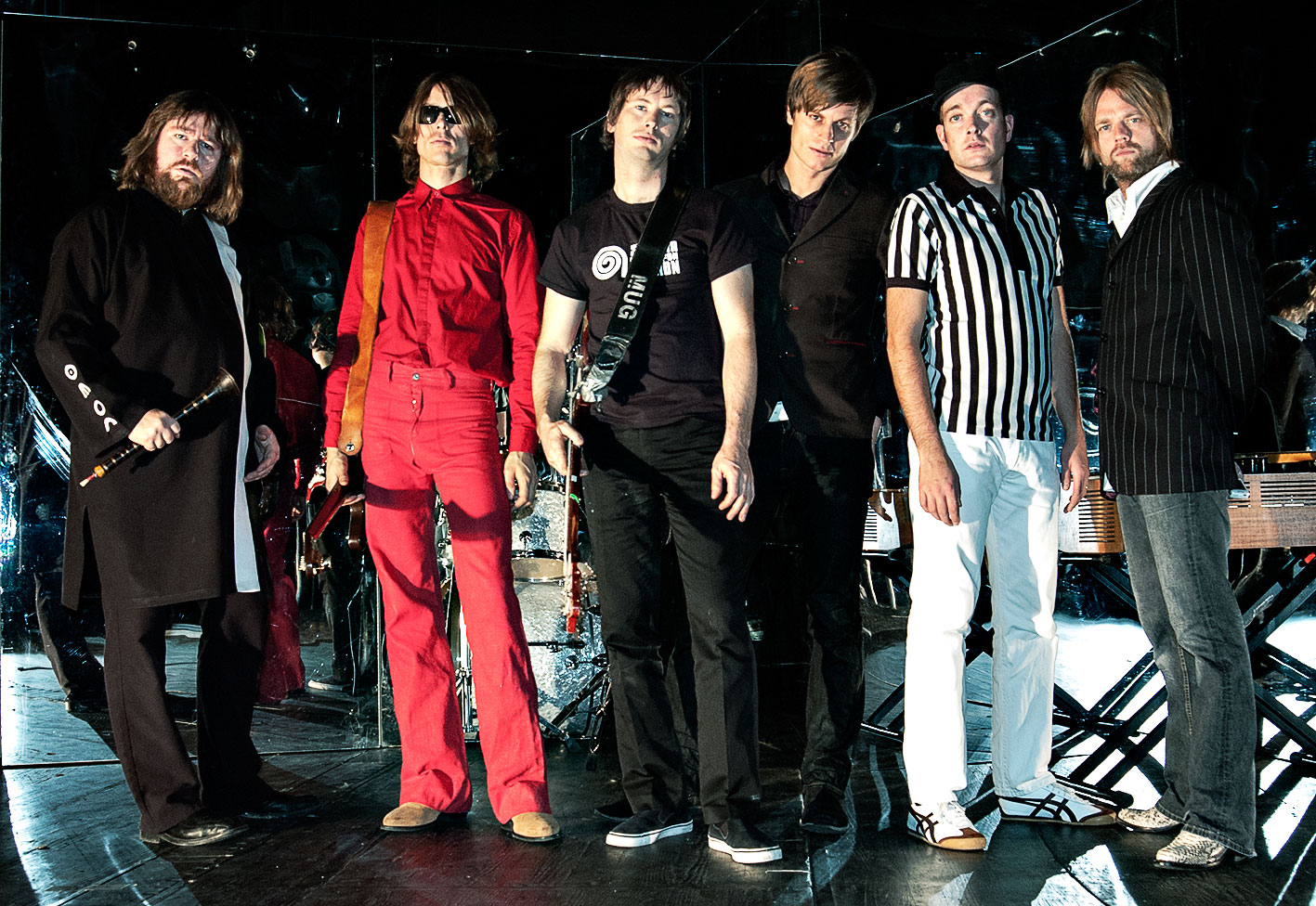
The Soundtrack Of Our Lives in 2004.

The Soundtrack of Our Lives, often abbreviated T.S.O.O.L., is a Swedish rock band that formed in Gothenburg in 1995 and disbanded in 2012, before reuniting again in 2023. The band's style draws heavily from sixties and seventies rock and punk, such as Rolling Stones and Iggy and the Stooges. Psychedelic rock is another strong influence for the band, and psychedelic and mystical references are also prominent in the band's lyrics and aesthetics. The abbreviation 'OEOC', which is featured on all their albums, refers to the phrase "as above, so below" from Hermeticism. The name of the bands own independent record label is Akashic Records.

== Formation ==
The Soundtrack of Our Lives was originally formed by Torbjörn "Ebbot" Lundberg, Björn Olsson, Ian Person, Kalle Gustafsson Jerneholm, Fredrik Sandsten and Martin Hederos. Several members, including vocalist Ebbot Lundberg, had previously played in the punk rock band Union Carbide Productions, while Jerneholm had previously released an album with Gothenburg grunge rockers Electric Eskimoes. Olsson, who as a guitarist had helped craft the band's sound, left T.S.O.O.L. after its first release, Welcome to the Infant Freebase, to pursue a solo career. He was replaced by Mattias Bärjed, who, like other members, has also engaged in solo and spinoff projects.

== Band members ==
- Mattias Bärjed – guitar, backing vocals (1997–2012, 2023–)
- Kalle Gustafsson Jerneholm – bass guitar, backing vocals (1995-2012, 2023–)
- Martin Hederos – keyboards, backing vocals (1995–2012, 2023–)
- Ebbot Lundberg – lead vocals (1995–2012, 2023–)
- Ian Person – guitar, backing vocals (1995–2012, 2023–)
- Fredrik Sandsten – drums, backing vocals (1995–2012, 2023–)

Apart from those mentioned instruments, they all played other instruments such as mellotron, dulcimer, cello, piano, sitar, cembalo and others.

Former band member:

- Björn Olsson – guitar, backing vocals (1995–1997)

== Tours and releases ==
The band found critical success in the United States in 2002, with their third album Behind the Music, released the previous year in Sweden and the rest of Europe. It was nominated for the Best Alternative Album award at the 2003 Grammy Awards. They toured the US in 2002 with Oasis, in support of their album Behind the Music.

Their double album Communion was released in November 2008. After a tour of the US the band announced that they were working on their next record Throw It Into the Universe. In October 2010, the band announced it would be releasing their first 'best of' compilation entitled Golden Greats no. 1. According to a statement on their website: "The band has spent much of the summer of 2010 in Svenska Grammofonstudion [sic] where they remastered the original recordings and in part picked up nuances that somehow went missing. With the carefully restored and remastered versions we are invited to TSOOL classics in a way we never heard them before."

In early 2012, the band announced on their website that their latest album, Throw It to the Universe, was complete. The album was released on 18 April 2012.

Lead singer Ebbot Lundberg stated in an interview with Intro Magazine that Throw It to the Universe would be the band's final album, stating that he felt it completed the band's journey. The band performed its last show on 22 December 2012 in Stockholm.

In 2023, the band reunited for a number of festival performances in Sweden, Norway, and Spain. A tour of Sweden took place in the spring of 2024, and more dates were added for summer and autumn.

== Songs featured in popular culture ==
Their track "Instant Repeater 99" is played during the closing credits of the 2002 film Spun.

Their track "Sister Surround" was included on the "jukebox" of EA Sports' MVP Baseball 2003, while "Karmageddon" is featured on EA Sports' NHL 2005 and FIFA Football 2005 video games. and in the movie Grand Theft Parsons. "Sister Surround" was also featured in an episode of Six Feet Under. Their track "Babel On" was featured in MLB 10: The Show.

Their track "Bigtime" featured as the theme of WrestleMania 21 and on the soundtrack of the PAL version of Gran Turismo 4. Their track "Mother One Track Mind" was also featured on the Gran Turismo 4 soundtrack. T.S.O.O.L.'s songs "Sister Surround" and "Ten Years Ahead" both appear on the In Good Company soundtrack as well.

The song "Second Life Replay" was featured during an episode of the fourth season of Californication and "What's Your Story" in season six.

== Discography ==
=== Studio albums ===
Year	Details	Peak chart positions				Certifications (sales thresholds)
Year	Details	SWE	FIN	UK	US	Certifications (sales thresholds)
1996	Welcome to the Infant Freebase: Released: March 1996; Label: Telegram Records	7	—	—	—	SWE: Gold
1998	Extended Revelation for the Psychic Weaklings of Western Civilization: Released: April 1998; Label: Telegram Records	16	—	—	—	
2001	Behind the Music: Released: February 2001; Label: Telegram Records	3	—	95	—	SWE: Gold
2004	Origin Vol. 1: Released: 18 October 2004; Label: Telegram Records	1	20	136	179	SWE: Gold
2008	Communion: Released: 26 November 2008; Label: Telegram Records	1	—	—	—	
2012	Throw It to the Universe: Released: 18 April 2012; Label: Telegram Records	1	—	—	—	

=== Compilation albums ===
Year	Details	Peak chart positions				Certifications (sales thresholds)
Year	Details	SWE	FIN	UK	US	Certifications (sales thresholds)
2005	A Present from the Past: Released: 7 December 2005; Label: Telegram Records	34	—	—	—	
2010	Golden Greats No. 1: Released: 24 November 2010; Label: Telegram Records	—	—	—	—	
2014	Rest in Piece 1994–2012: Released: 29 January 2014; Label: Parlophone S	—	—	—	—	

=== EPs ===
Year	Details
1996	Homo Habilis Blues: Released: 1996; Label: Telegram Records; Position: No. 23 (SWE)
2000	Gimme Five!: Released: 21 June 2000; Label: Telegram Records; Position: No. 58 (SWE)
2010	The Immaculate Convergence: Released: 2010; Label: Yep Roc
2010	Live at Lime: Released: 2010; Label: Limewire
2012	Shine On (There's Another Day After Tomorrow): Released: December 2012; Label: EMI

=== Singles ===
Year	Title	Chart positions		Album
Year	Title	SWE	UK	Album
1996	"Instant Repeater '99"	—	—	Welcome to the Infant Freebase
1997	"Blow My Cool"	—	—	Welcome to the Infant Freebase
1998	"Mantra Slider"	—	—	Welcome to the Infant Freebase
1998	"Black Star"	—	—	Extended Revelation for the Psychic Weaklings of the Western Civilization
1998	"Firmament Vacation (A Soundtrack of Our Lives)"	—	96	Welcome to the Infant Freebase
1998	"Instant Repeater '99" (remix)	—	156	Welcome to the Infant Freebase
1999	"Avenger Hill Street Blues"	—	—	Non-album single
2001	"Still Aging"	—	—	Behind the Music
2001	"Nevermore"	—	—	Behind the Music
2001	"Sister Surround"	60	80	Behind the Music
2001	"21st Century Rip Off"	—	114	Behind the Music
2004	"Bigtime"	1	78	Origin Vol. 1
2004	"Believe I've Found"	—	—	Origin Vol. 1
2005	"Heading for a Breakdown"	—	70	Origin Vol. 1
2008	"Thrill Me"	—	—	Communion
2009	"Ra 88"	—	—	Communion
2009	"Flipside"	—	—	Communion
2009	"Babel On" (radio edit)	—	—	Communion
2009	"The Ego Delusion" (radio edit)	—	—	Communion
2010	"Demophon"	—	—	non-album download-only singles
2010	"Earthmover"	—	—	non-album download-only singles
2010	"You Better Run"	—	—	non-album download-only singles
2012	"Try Again"	—	—	non-album download-only singles
2012	"What's Your Story?"	—	—	Throw It to the Universe
2012	"Throw It to the Universe" (radio edit)	—	—	Throw It to the Universe
