= Martin Hederos =

Swedish musician (born 1972)

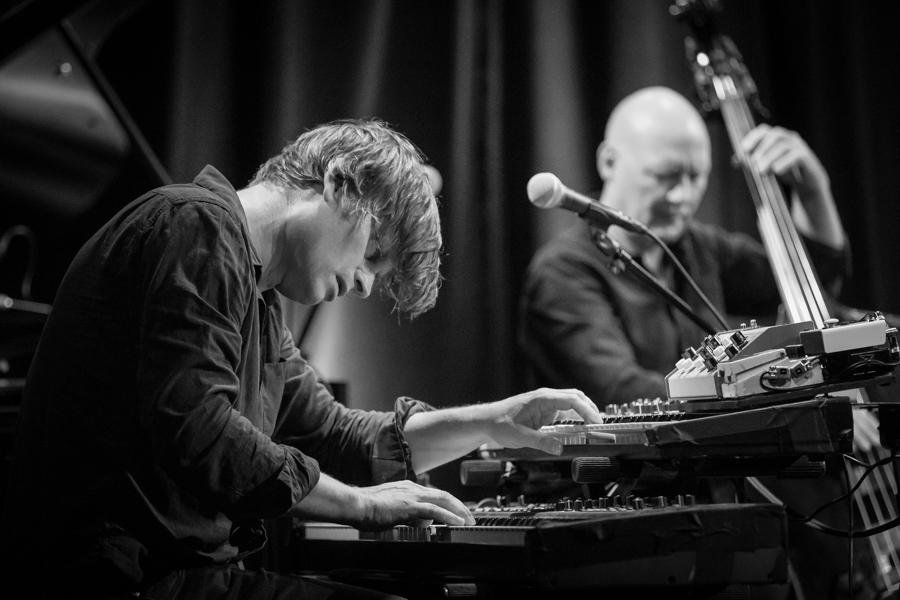
- Martin Hederos performing at the 2017 Oslo Jazz Festival

Background information
- Born: 30 June 1972 (age 54); Karlstad, Sweden
- Genre: Jazz
- Instrument: Keyboard

Martin Hederos is a founding member of Nymphet Noodlers and The Soundtrack of Our Lives. He is also a member of the duo Hederos & Hellberg together with Mattias Hellberg, as well as ex-Esbjörn Svensson Trio bassist Dan Berglund's Tonbruket collective. He has released two albums with Nino Ramsby; Visorna (2004) and Jazzen (2006).

He was born on 30 June 1972 in Karlstad, Sweden. At Riagalan, he and Irya Gmeyner won best music for a fictional programme for their score of Sisters 1968 (2018).
