= Totta Näslund =

- Birth name: Erik Torsten Näslund
- Born: April 1, 1945; Sandviken, Sweden
- Died: June 19, 2005 (aged 60); Gothenburg, Sweden
- Genres: Progg, blues, rock, jazz
- Occupation(s): Musician, singer, actor
- Instrument(s): Vocals, guitar
- Years active: 1975–2005

Erik Torsten "Totta" Näslund (1 April 1945 – 19 June 2005) was a Swedish blues musician and actor.

== Biography ==
Näslund was born in Sandviken and grew up in a small working-class town in Ångermanland in the middle of Sweden called Köpmanholmen, but moved to Gothenburg in 1970 to find work. He was working in the Gothenburg docks when he joined Nynningen, a rock group with leftist political texts and inspired by the Russian Communist poet Mayakovsky. Totta Näslund became the group's main singer.

In the mid-1970s, Nynningen fused with Nationalteatern, a musical theater ensemble with many members. Totta Näslund joined the group as singer, guitar-player and actor. Nationalteatern developed away from the theater and became a straight rock group, a rock orchestra as they called themselves. Even though Totta never wrote any own songs for the band, he was probably the most prominent member, next to Ulf Dageby.

Nationalteatern was one of the many leftist music and theater groups that came together in 1977 to form Tältprojektet, The Tent Project, a musical theater performance on the history of the Swedish working class, which toured the country that summer. Totta Näslund played the Beggar, the central story telling character of the play, and he sang some of the lead songs, like Aldrig mera krig (Never War Again) and Vi äro tusenden (We are legion). Tältprojekted, a non-profit making experiment financed by its members and supporters, was highly successful.

In the beginning of the 1980s, Nationalteatern dissolved and Totta Näslund directed his full energy to his hobby project, Totta's Bluesband with lyrics in English and several smaller tours in the U.S.

In 1995, when Totta turned 50 years old, he decided to go for a solo career and has released 8 solo albums with mostly songs written directly for him by other artists, or covers of other songs.

One of Totta Näslund's main sources for inspirations was Bob Dylan, and in May 2005 he went to Dylan's hometown Hibbing, Minnesota despite his terminal cancer, where he performed his own interpretation of Bob Dylan songs. Totta had also started making an album together with Mikael Wiehe, with Dylan songs translated to Swedish, but this was interrupted when he suddenly died.

== Death ==
Totta Näslund died on 19 June 2005 of liver cancer. He was scheduled to perform in his hometown Köpmanholmen the next day. He was 60 years old.

== Selected discography ==
With Nationalteatern

- 1976 - Kåldolmar och kalsipper
- 1978 - Barn av vår tid
- 1980 - Rövarkungens ö
- 1987 - Peter Pan

With Tottas Bluesband

- 1981 - Live at Renströmska
- 1983 - Saturday night boogie woogie
- 1985 - Combination boogie
- 1988 - Compilation boogie (1981–1986)
- 2003 - Sitting on top of the world

As a solo artist

- 1995 - Totta
- 1996 - Totta 2 - Hjärtats slutna rum
- 1999 - Totta 3 - En dåre som jag
- 2001 - Totta 4 - Duetterna
- 2002 - Totta 5 - Turnén
- 2002 - Totta 6 - Bortom månen & mars
- 2004 - Totta 7 - Soul på drift
- 2005 - Totta 8 - Greatest Hits - Bättre begagnat
- 2006 - Totta & Wiehe - Dylan, posthumous, songs by Bob Dylan translated to Swedish, together with Mikael Wiehe

== Filmography ==
- Vildängel (1997) (film)
- Blueprint (1992) (mini-series)
- Som man ropar (1987) (TV series)
- Taxibilder (1984) (mini-series)
- Tryggare kan ingen vara (1984) (TV series)
