= Tältprojektet =

Swedish musical theater project

Tältprojektet – The Tent Project (Sweden, 1977) was a musical theater performance on the history of the Swedish working class, which toured the country the summer of 1977 in a huge circus tent. The group included over 100 people, musicians, actors, and members of some of the biggest progg bands of Sweden at the time, most notable Nationalteatern. The Tent Project was a radical, leftist political movement, but it included different political groups from anarchists to different types of communists and socialists.

The story of the approximately four-hour play was on the history of the Swedish working class movement from 1879 to the present (1977), and the cast of characters included August Palm, Kata Dalström, Hjalmar Branting and Zeth Höglund. The central story telling character was the beggar, played by Totta Näslund. Another major role was played by Sven Wollter who, as the clown, was sort of the host of the show. Most of the songs performed in the Tent Project were written by Ulf Dageby.

The tour made 82 performances, and over 100,000 people went to see the show, as it toured through almost every city in Sweden and some in Denmark. Some of the songs were later released on an LP.

Some of the most notable songs from Tältprojektet are Aldrig mera krig (Never War Again) and Vi äro tusenden (We are thousands), both sung by Totta Näslund and written by Ulf Dageby.

== Cast ==
Some of the most notable of the people who performed in Tältprojektet.

- Björn Holmgren
- Sven Wollter
- Totta Näslund
- Ulf Dageby
- Christer Boustedt
- Ale Möller
- Christer Dahl
- Michael Segerström
- Anki Rahlskog
- Pale Olofsson
- Eva Remaeus
- Nicke Ström
- Sonja Lund
- Henric Holmberg
- Hans Mosesson
- Med Reventberg
- Barbro Oborg
- Johannes Brost
- Björn Granath
- Rolf Holmgren
- Yvonne Schaloske
- Paula Brandt
- Per Eggers
- Jussi Larnö
