= Nationalsånger – Hymner från Vågen och EPAs torg =

Nationalsånger - Hymner från Vågen och EPAs torg

Compilation album by Various artists
- Released: March 25, 2002
- Genre: Progg
- Label: Stockholm National

Nationalsånger – Hymner från Vågen och EPAs torg is an album recorded and released in 2002 by several of Sweden's most noteworthy artists as a tribute to the Swedish progg band Nationalteatern. The booklet also contains notes from some of the artists and others about their personal relationships with Nationalteatern's music.

== Track listing ==
- Sent En Lördagskväll
  From the 1980 release "Rövarkungens ö", performed by the rock band The Hellacopters.
- Bängen Trålar (Anders Melander)
  From "Livet är en fest" released in 1974, performed by The Soundtrack of Our Lives and Nina Persson.
- Jack The Ripper (Anders Melander)
  From the 1974 album "Livet är en fest", performed by the Backyard Babies.
- Kolla Kolla (Anders Melander)
  From the 1978 album "Barn av vår tid" and performed by The Ark.
- En Dag På Sjön (Ulf Dageby)
  From Ulf Dageby's solo album with the same name released in 1983, performed by Pelle Ossler.
- Barn Av Vår Tid (Ulf Dageby)
  From the album with the same title performed by Lennart Eriksson, Dogge Doggelito and The Diamond Dogs.
- Lägg Av! (Anders Melander)
  Released in 1974 on "Livet är en fest" and performed by hardcore band LOK.
- Hanna Från Arlöv (Ulf Dageby)
  From the 1974 album "Livet är en fest" performed by Lisa Miskovsky and Christian Kjellvander.
- Speedy Gonzales (Anders Melander)
  Released in 1974 on the album "Livet är en fest", performed by Stefan Sundström and Weeping Willows.
- Aldrig Mera Krig (Ulf Dageby, Peter Wahlqvist)
  From the tent show "Vi äro tusenden" released on record in 1977, performed by Bob Hansson and Moder Jords Massiva.
- Men Bara Om Min Älskade Väntar (Bob Dylan, Ulf Dageby)
  A translation of Bob Dylan's "Tomorrow is a long time" released on the album "Barn av vår tid", performed by Uno Svenningsson and Sophie Zelmani.
- Ut I Kylan (Ulf Dageby)
  Originally released in 1972 on the album "Ta det som ett löfte.....ta det inte som ett hot", performed by MLB & Ulf Dageby.
- Popens Mussolinis
  From the 1978 album "Barn av vår tid", performed by Regina Lund and Conny Bloom.
- Livet Är En Fest (Ulf Dageby)
  Originally released on the 1974 album with the same name, performed by Lambretta.
