= Diamond Dogs (band) =

Swedish rock band

- Origin: Sweden
- Genres: Boogie rock; glam rock; rock and roll; hard rock
- Years active: Early 1990s–2015
- Label: Smilodon
- Past members: Sören 'Sulo' Karlsson; Lars Karlsson; Henrik 'The Duke of Honk' Widén; Martin Tronsson; Johannes Nordell; Magic see members section
- Website: Official Website

The Diamond Dogs was a Swedish rock band founded in Katrineholm during the early 1990s, by vocalist Sören 'Sulo' Karlsson and guitarist Anders 'Boba' Lindström.

== History ==
The line-up has changed several times throughout the band's career and has included members from bands such as The Hellacopters, Stefan Sundströms back-up band, Wilmer X, Snatch, Dogs D'Amour, Nymphet Noodlers, Hederos & Hellberg and The Soundtrack Of Our Lives; however, the band's music has always been rooted in 1970's rock. The band has also toured extensively with bands such as Hanoi Rocks, The Damned, Nazareth, Georgia Satellites, Ian Hunter and The Cult. The band has been especially successful in Italy with crowds of up to ten thousand attending some of their concerts. In 2002, the band teamed up with the Swedish musician, Lennart Eriksson, to record a track for a tribute album to Nationalteatern along with The Latin Kings frontman Dogge Doggelito. The band recorded all of their live shows throughout Spain. The band announced their split after 25 years, on their Facebook page on September 29, 2015.

== Line up ==
=== Former members ===
- Sören 'Sulo' Karlsson - Vocals
- Lars Karlsson – Guitar
- Henrik 'The Duke of Honk' Widén – Keyboard
- Martin Tronsson – Bass
- Johannes Nordell – Drums
- Mats 'Magic' Gunnarsson - Saxophone
- Anders Lindström - Guitar
- Stevie Klasson - Guitar
- Jesper Karlsson - Drums
- Magnus Leje - Guitar
- Stefan 'Björken' Björk - Bass
- Robert Dahlqvist – Guitar
- Kent Axén - Guitar
- Fredrik Fagerlund - Guitar
- Johan Johansson - Bass
- Daniel Johansson - Drums

== Selected discography ==
=== Albums ===
- 1994: Honked
- 2001: As Your Greens Turn Brown
- 2002: Too Much is Always Better than Not Enough
- 2003: That's the Juice I'm On - alternative mixes and unreleased tracks from earlier album sessions
- 2004: Black River Road
- 2005: Bound to Ravage - Greatest Hits compilation
- 2006: Up the Rock
- 2008: Most Likely
- 2010: The Grit & The Very Soul
- 2012: Set Fire to It All
- 2015: Quitters & Complainers
- 2019: Recall Rock 'N' Roll And The Magic Soul
- 2022: Slap Bang Blue Rendezvous
- 2025: Macon Georgia Giant (with Chris Spedding)

=== EPs ===
- 2000: Among the Nonbelievers
- 2001: Shortplayer
- 2008: The Conception

=== Singles ===
- 1993: "Blue Eyes Shouldn't be Cryin'"
- 1995: "Good Time Girl"
- 1996: "Need of Ammunition"

=== Other releases ===
- 2002: contributed to tribute album Nationalsånger - Hymner från Vågen och EPAs torg
- 2004: Atlantic Crossover - Diamond Dogs vs Jeff Dahl
- 2008: Cookin - performing the music of Sam Cooke
