= Progg =

Swedish musical movement

Progg was a left-wing and anti-commercial musical movement in Sweden that began in the late 1960s and became more widespread in the 1970s. Not to be confused with the English expressions "progressive music" or "prog rock," progg is a contraction of the Swedish word for musical progressivism, progressiv musik. While there were progg bands playing progressive rock, the progg movement encompassed many different musical genres.

The political progg movement culminated around the 1975 Eurovision Song Contest, which was held in Stockholm after ABBAs victory in Brighton the year before. It was expressed that "music can't be a contest" and an "alternative festival" was held in protest. Due to this debate, Sweden did not participate in the 1976 Eurovision Song Contest.

The progg movement was closely connected to similar movements in arts, theatre and design, as well as alternative lifestyles and left-wing views. While being a political movement, some bands labelled as progg were nonetheless unaligned with any political agenda. The people playing and listening to this music came to be called proggare (literally "proggers") in Swedish.

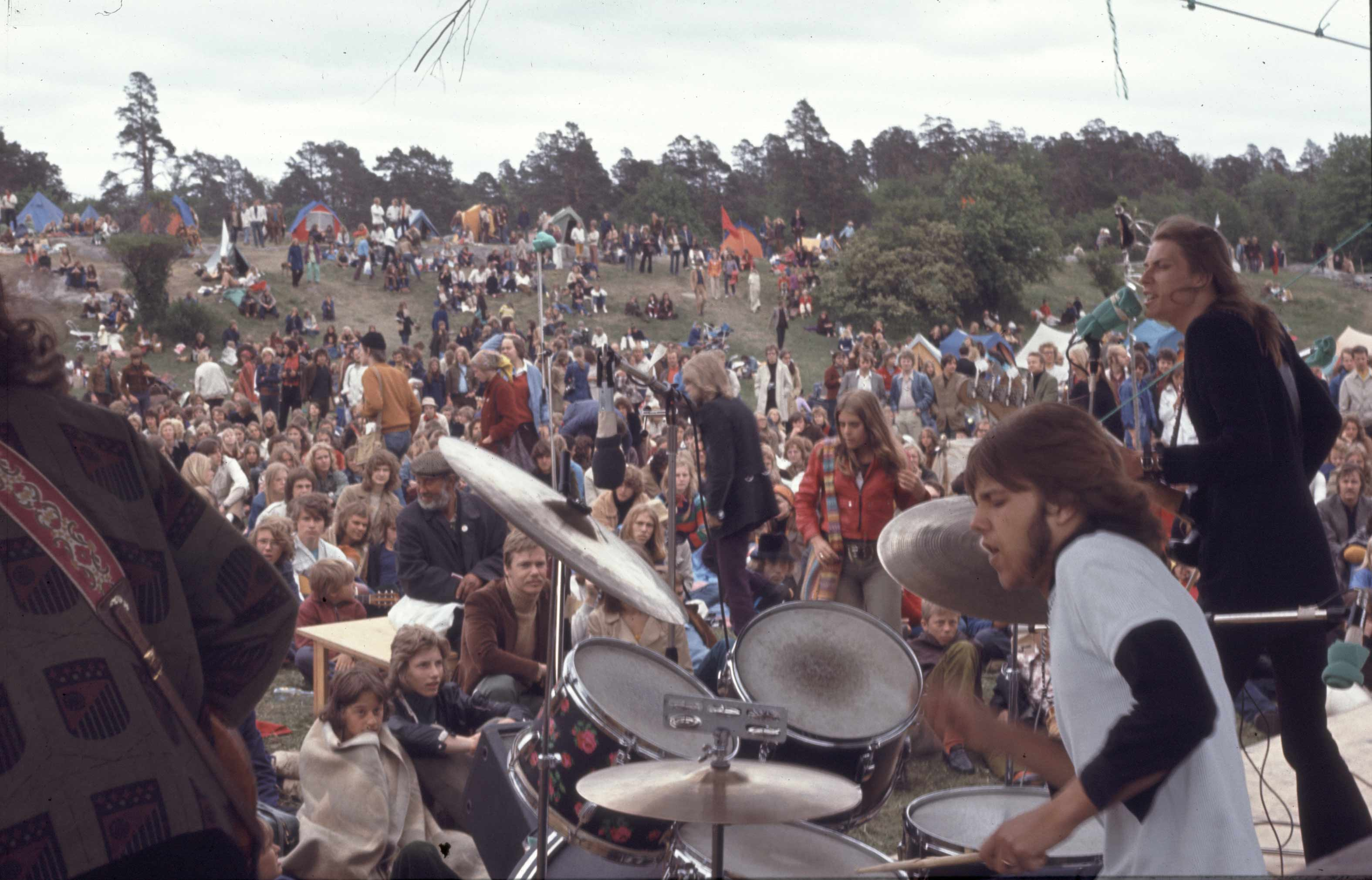
Gärdet festival 1971

== History ==
Alternative bands began to form in the late 1960s, but the movement emerged in full in the summer of 1970. A big alternative music festival was held at the field Gärdet in Stockholm between June 12 and June 14. The festival was illegal, as a permission for it had not been obtained. The new independent record company Silence released a compilation record with music from the festival as their first record, and signed some of the bands that played, including Träd, Gräs och Stenar and Gudibrallan. In 1971 MNW was formed. During this decade the progg movement had a strong position in the musical landscape of Sweden.

At the end of the 1970s, however, the movement started to decline, as many of the bands disintegrated and the music forums were closed. The left-wing ideals became less dominant among young people, and the rock and folk music also became less popular than new genres such as hard rock and electronic music.

== The movement ==
Many musicians and people working with music in the end of the 1960s were against the commercialism of pop music. Notably, the record companies Silence and MNW were formed, and started to record and release this new music. They created a new distribution company, SAM-distribution, which distributed the records of the alternative record companies, and so-called music forums, places where concerts could be held without a commercial middleman such as ordinary concert arrangers were created in many Swedish cities. In the middle of the 1970s around 75 music forums existed. The word that was generally used about the movement was musikrörelsen, which means the music movement.

== The music ==
Progg did not have a uniform sound and featured a broad spectrum of musical styles. There were a wide range of artists as well, including Bo Hansson, Kebnekajse, Södra bergens balalaikor, Blå Tåget, Hoola Bandoola Band, Nationalteatern, Dag Vag, and Jan Hammarlund. Most lyrics were in Swedish, while English was the common language for other pop and rock in Sweden at the time.

The two big progg record companies had a somewhat different musical profile.

== Opinions ==
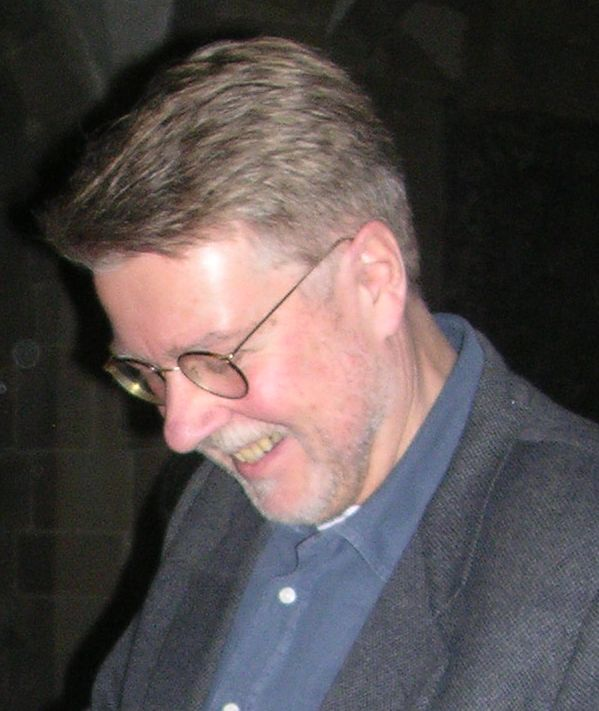
Mikael Wiehe, one of the founding members of Hoola Bandoola Band.

The progg movement took a clear stance against capitalism and commercialism, but it was by no means a homogeneous movement. The political opinions ranged from everything from anarchism and communism to less clearly pronounced general left-wing opinions. The relations with the governing Social Democratic Party were not that good, which can be exemplified by the song "Sosse" ("Social Democrat") by Gudibrallan. Few people in the movement were members of any political party, though the communist parties, the Communist Party of Sweden and 1967 Communist Party (KFML) started their own record companies which joined the movement.

The United NLF Groups were a strong movement in support of the National Liberation Front of South Vietnam, and progg bands often played at their demonstrations. Progg bands also played at other big demonstrations at the time, such as the protest that stopped the cutting down of the elms in the park Kungsträdgården in Stockholm, and the protests to stop the tennis matches against tennis players from the Pinochet-ruled Chile in Båstad 1975.

In 1977 the record company Silence moved their studio to the small village Koppom in the forests of the province of Värmland.

== Legacy ==
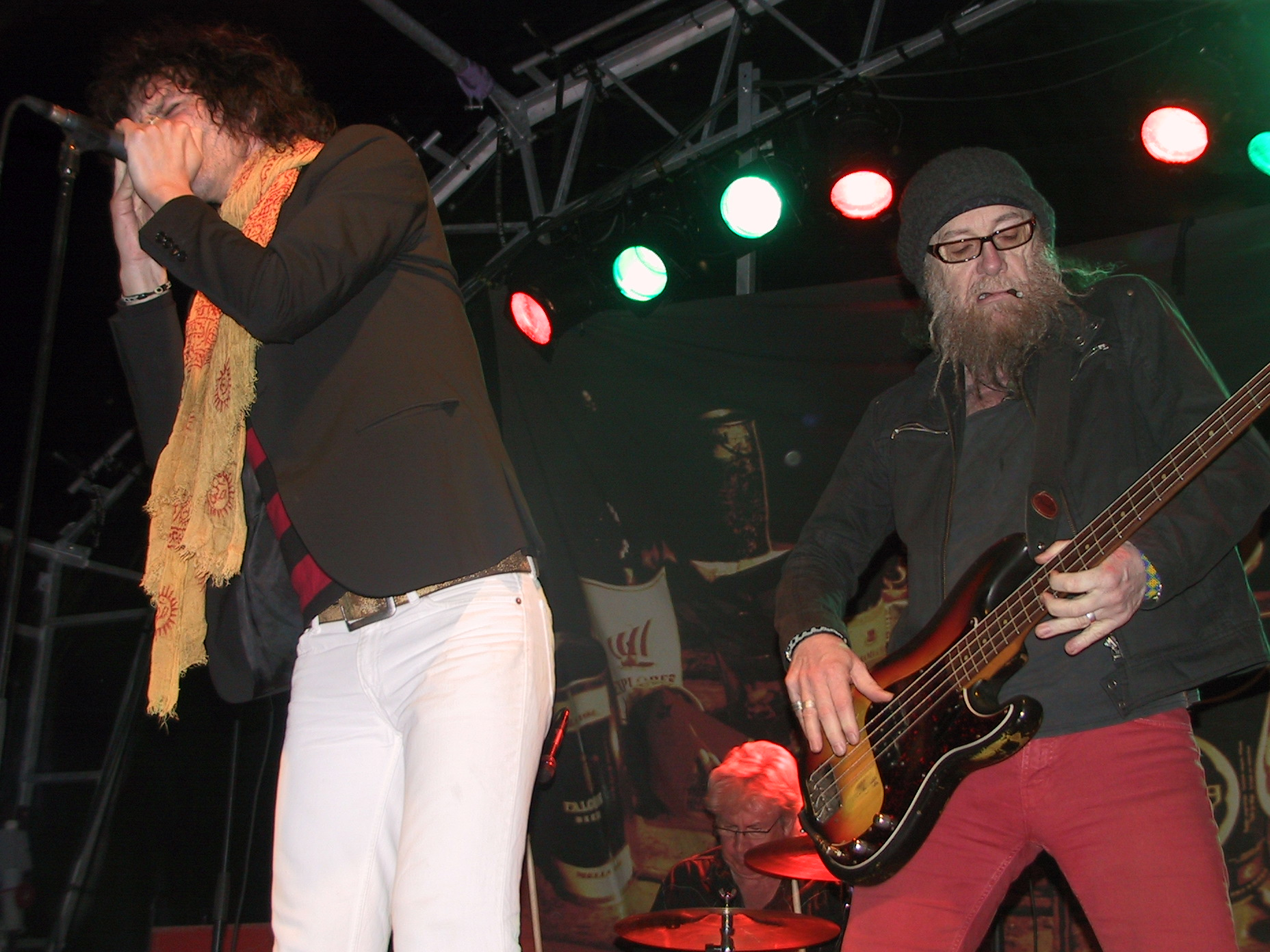
Bassplayer Nikke Ström of Nationalteatern and singer Mattias Hellberg performing live in 2007

Some of the artists from the progg movement have continued to play music and managed to remain popular over the years, for example Björn Afzelius, Mikael Wiehe, Totta Näslund and Peps Persson.

There has been a stereotypical image of progg as something out of date and spaced out from the 1970s. On the other hand, since the end of the 1990s, many progg bands have experienced some renaissance, with many old progg bands reuniting for concerts and new records, for example Träd, Gräs och Stenar and Samla Mammas Manna. Some bands, like Nationalteatern, still go on long tours in the 21st century performing their old songs for a new generation. Silence has re-released much of their catalogue from the 1970s on CD, and old LPs with progg music are sold at high prices.

There are new musicians who have references to the progg music, and are sometimes called nyprogg (new progg), for example Dungen, Hovet, Cirkus Miramar and Doktor Kosmos.

The film Together from 2000 is set in Sweden during the progg era and features much progg music.

The Swedish comics artist David Nessle created the character Den Maskerade Proggaren ("The Masked Progger") as a pastiche on both the progg movement and Silver Age superhero comics.

== List of progg bands ==
- Älgarnas Trädgård
- Andra bullar
- Arbete & Fritid
- Atlas
- Baby Grandmothers
- Blå Tåget
- Bo Hansson
- Contact
- Doktor Kosmos
- Elda med höns
- Eldkvarn
- Eld Attack Krossa (EAK)
- Ensamma hjärtan
- Fläsket Brinner
- Freedom Singers
- Fria Proteatern
- Gläns över sjö & strand
- Gudibrallan
- Gunder Hägg
- Hansson & Karlsson
- Harvester
- Häxfeber
- Hoola Bandoola Band
- International Harvester
- Kaipa
- Kebnekajse
- King George Discovery
- Knutna Nävar
- Kung Tung
- Lift
- Love Explosion
- Låt tredje örat lyssna in & tredje benet stampa takten
- Mecki Mark Men
- Mobben
- Motvind
- Mörbyligan
- Nationalteatern
- NJA-gruppen
- Norrbottens Järn
- November
- Nynningen
- Pärson Sound
- Philemon Arthur and the Dung
- Ragnarök
- Rekyl
- Risken finns
- Röda bönor
- Röda kapellet
- Röda Ropet
- Samla Mammas Manna
- Solen Skiner
- Svenska Musikrörelsen
- Södra Bergens Balalaikor
- Trettioåriga Kriget
- Träd, Gräs och Stenar
- Turid
- Vargavinter
