= Martin Aagård =

Swedish journalist, musician and literary critic

Sven Martin Aagård
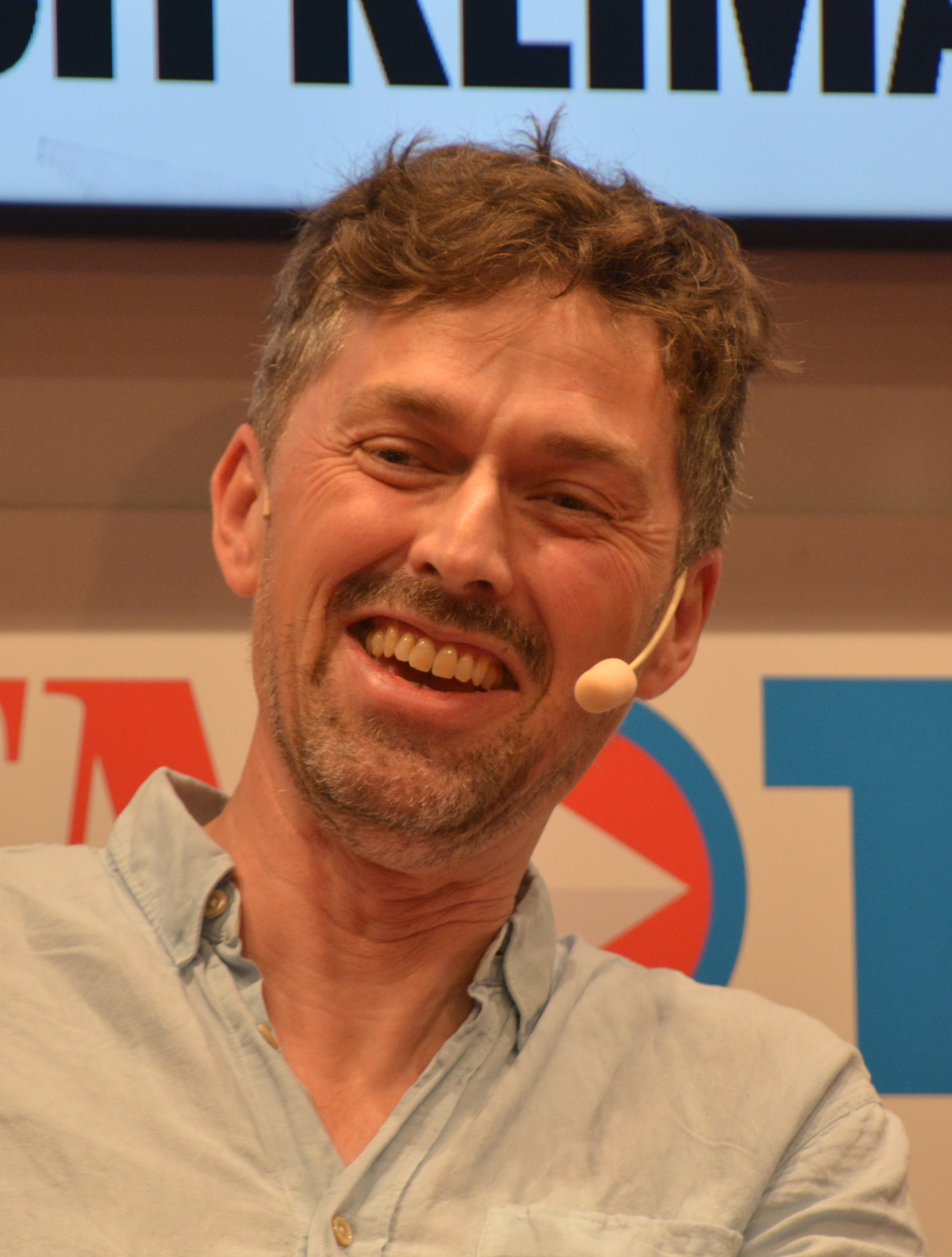
- Born: 5 March 1971 (age 55); Gävle, Sweden
- Occupations: Culture journalist, editor, musician
- Spouse: Natalia Kazmierska

Sven Martin Aagård (born 5 March 1971) is a Swedish culture journalist and newspaper and magazine editor and a member of the Swedish pop band Doktor Kosmos.

== Early life and education ==
Aagård is from Gävle, where he was educated at the elite Vasaskolan gymnasium. He later wrote about participating in hazing as a member of a men's club there, and has also said that in school he and his friends hung out with members of the Communist Youth "because they were fun" and that for a while he took part in anarchistic demonstrations with Nature and Youth Sweden.

== Career ==
=== Music ===
With his friend Uje Brandelius, Aagård played in a rockabilly band called Handsome Hank and the Hookers. In 1991, they formed the pop band Doktor Kosmos with Twiggy Pop and Miss Universum; he plays guitar, bass and synthesizer.

=== Journalism ===
Aagård has worked as a literary critic and radio columnist. He has been a culture writer for Dagens Nyheter, culture editor for Arbetarbladet and Dalarnas Tidningar, an editor of the defunct culture magazine Sex, editor-in-chief of the art magazine Konstnären, the editor of the "Under strecket" essay section in Svenska Dagbladet, and deputy culture editor at Aftonbladet under Åsa Linderborg, then acting culture editor following her departure in 2019. In 2022, he became the culture editor at Dagens ETC. He has also contributed to the magazines Arena, Neo and Filter, and the culture sections of the newspapers Expressen, Helsingborgs Dagblad and Sydsvenskan.

In 2006, he was a reporter for the investigative TV4 programme Drevet, a show where reporters were expected to clearly state their own position in their segments. Aagård produced reports on, among other things, Antifascist Action, the Plymouth Brethren, and anti-abortion activists. The segment on the Plymouth Brethren was ruled by the Broadcasting Commission to have violated the requirement for impartiality.

In 2015, Aagård and Aftonbladet were sued for 30,000 SEK by the artist Richard Herrey after Aagård called Herrey "din gamle rasist" ('you old racist') in an exchange on X. Herrey lost the case against both parties.

== Personal life ==
In 2010, Aagård married Aftonbladet journalist Natalia Kazmierska. Together they published in 2018 Popkulturens död ('The Death of Pop Culture'), a book which advances a theory of popular culture and argues that its revolutionary potential has disappeared.

== Books ==
- with Natalia Kazmierska. Popkulturens död, Stockholm: Atlas, 2018, ISBN 9789173895781 (in Swedish)
