= Stefan Sundström =

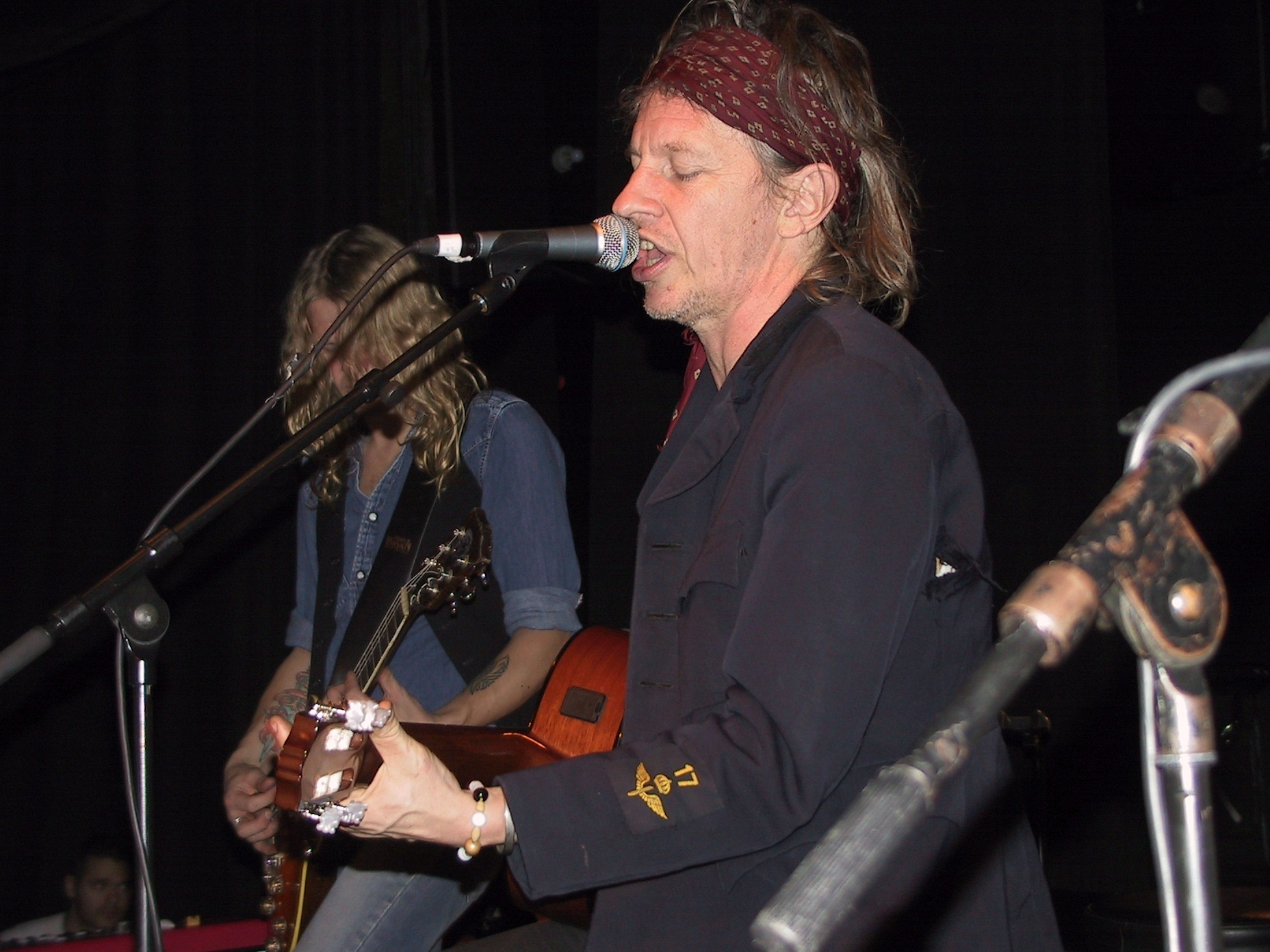

Background information
- Born: 11 May 1960 (age 65); Sweden
- Genres: Singer-songwriter, rock, progg
- Occupation(s): Musician, songwriter
- Instrument(s): Vocals, guitar
- Years active: 1974 to present
- Labels: MNW, National
- Website: stefansundstrom.se

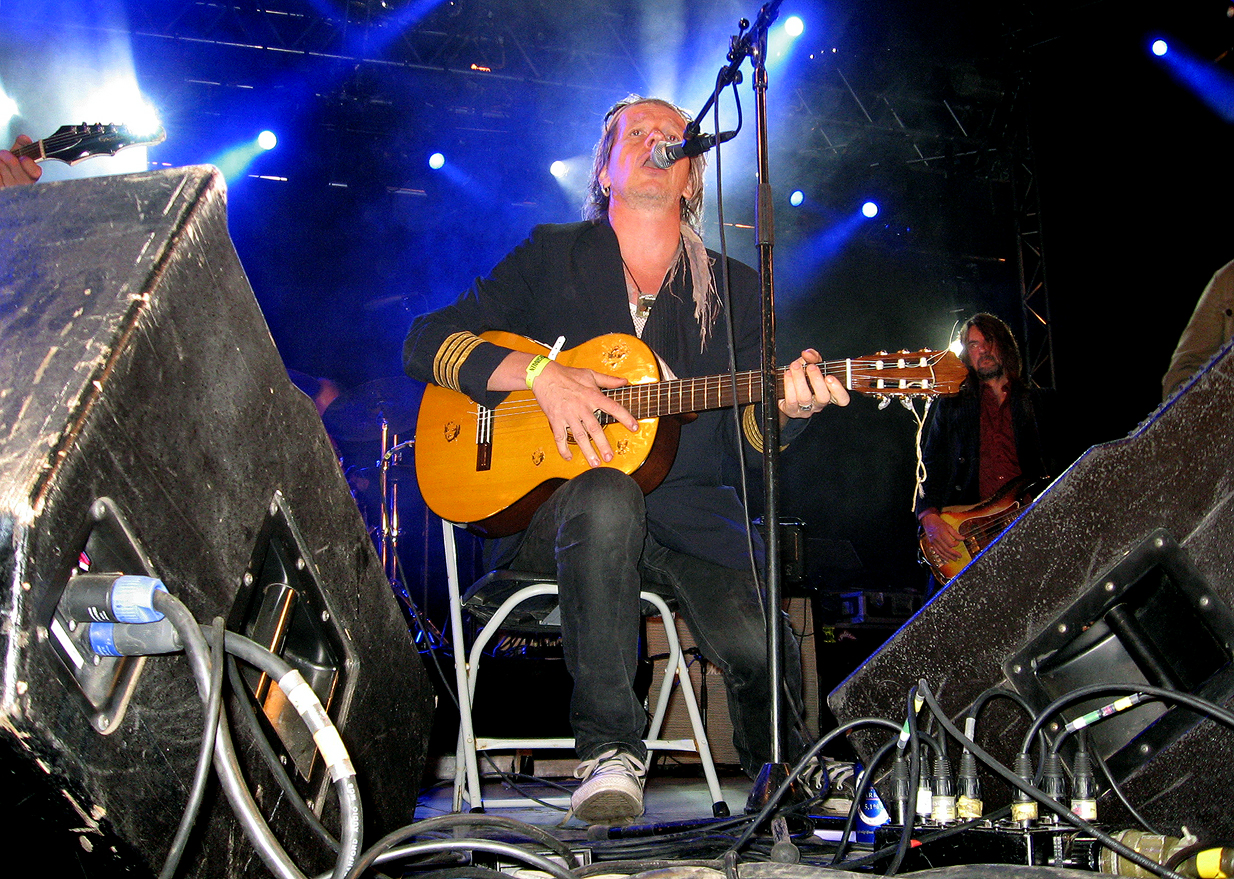
Stefan Sundström plays at The Malmö festivalen 2007

Stefan Sundström is a Swedish singer-songwriter and troubadour. After dropping out of school, he started playing in small bands such as Trots, Läppstars and Apache, which later went on to become Weeping Willows. Sundström's music often refers to other important Swedish musicians like Evert Taube, Dan Andersson, Carl Michael Bellman, Alice Tegnér, Astrid Lindgren, Ulf Dageby and Cornelis Vreeswijk.

Sundström is married to Karin Renberg and has two daughters. Renberg also plays guitar in his band.

== Discography ==
=== Albums ===
- Renjägarens visor (1989)
- En bärs med Nefertite (1990)
- Happy Hour Viser (1992)
- Hå Hå Ja Ja (1993)
- Vitabergspredikan, (1994)
- Nästan som reklam (1995)
- Babyland (1997)
- Bland skurkar, helgon och vanligt folk (1999)
- Fisk i en skål (2000)
- Sundström spelar Allan (2002)
- Pappa kom hem (2003)
- Hjärtats melodi (2004)
- Stolt men inte nöjd (2005)
- Fabler från Bällingebro (2006)
- Ingenting har hänt (2009)
- 5 dagar i augusti (2010)
- Under radarn (2013)
- Nu var det 2014 (2014)

=== Singles and EPs ===
- Vandrande vajan (1989)
- Nästan som reklam (1995)
- Allting kan vända (1995)
- Babyland (1997)
- Fläder (1997)
- Woaw Waow (1998)
- Har någon sett Sabina (2000)
- Hög kan bli låg (2000)
- Peace & love i Stockholms city (2001)
- Fredens man (2002)
- Dystervals (2002)
- Vi betalar inte (2003)
- Vissna blommor (2004)
- Somna lycklig (2004)
- Fula gubben Hitler (2004)
- En näve näring (2006)
- Nidelven (2009)
- Glöm din dröm (2009)
- Korinthierbrevet (2010)

=== Compilations and other work ===
- Golden Hits 1990–1998 (1998)
- Nationalsånger - Hymner från Vågen och EPAs torg (2002)
- Latlåtar 1991–2000 (2003)
- Framåt! – För Palestinas befrielse (2004)
- Nåt som glimta till (2005)
- Hits! (2007)
