= Röda Bönor =

Röda bönor (A Swedish pun meaning both "red beans" and "red chicks") was a feminist progg band formed in Lund in the mid 1970s. Röda bönor was one of the progg movement's first real girl bands. The lyrics and music were written mainly by the band members. Their most famous song is "Oh, Carol", a parody of Neil Sedaka's "Oh! Carol". Others include "Diskoteksjakt" ("Disco-hunt"), "Sången om sexualmyterna" ("The song of the sexual myths"), "Det ska bli slut på rumban" ("It's the end of the rumba") and "Nu har vi tröttnat" ("We have now become tired"). They are also known for exactly copying the Italian Socialist song "La Lega".

Members of the band included Charlotte Adlercreutz-Carlsson, Mona Eklund, Marianne Giselsson, Annbritt Kronlund, Kjerstin Norén, Gunilla Szemenkár, Eva Vahlne, Eva Westerberg and Kaya Ålander. Norén and Vahlne left the group after their first album. Norén and Ålander have also released solo albums. Röda bönor have recently reunited for occasional performances.

In 1981 Jan Hammarlund and Kjerstin Norén made "Tågen Till Reggio Kalabrien", a Swedish version of "I treni per Reggio Calabria", the song by Giovanna Marini about the 1972 bombings in Italy.

== Discography ==
- 1993 - Repris (rerelease, CD, MNWCD 238)
- 1978 - Sköna Skrönor (LP, MNW 89P)
- 1978 - Min søsters stemme. International kvindemusikfestival 78 (compilation, Demos 46)
- 1977 - Kvinnokulturfestivalen (compilation, Silence SRS 4647)
- 1976 - Röda Bönor (LP, MNW 74P)
