= The Crunch (band) =

Swedish power pop band

- Origin: Sweden
- Years active: 2013–present
- Members: Sören "Sulo" Karlsson; Mick Geggus; Dave Tregunna; Idde Schultz; Terry Chimes

The Crunch is a Swedish power pop band.

== Career ==
The Crunch started January 2013 after Sulo met the members when writing the book Keep Yourself Alive in 2012. The first single "Down by the Border," was released on 7" vinyl and a YouTube video on June 3, 2013, recorded at Berry Street Studio. The next single "Fire Again," was released for download and a YouTube video on October 14, 2013. The full album "Busy Making Noise" was released on October 28 (Legal Records) on CD, vinyl, and download. Their third single, a duet with Sulo and Swedish singer Idde Schultz called "A Little Bit of Grace," was released as a YouTube video on December 9, 2013.

The first gig the band did was at The Garage in London on June 5, 2013.

In 2015, the band's second album, "Brand New Brand," was released, funded through Music Pledge and distributed through Cargo Records.

== Members ==
- Sören "Sulo" Karlsson (frontman) from The Diamond Dogs
- Mick Geggus (guitar) from Cockney Rejects
- Dave Tregunna (bass) from Sham 69 and The Lords of the New Church
- Idde Schultz (Keyboard and backup vocals)
- Terry Chimes (drums) from The Clash.

== Discography ==
- Busy Making Noise - 2013 Legal Records
- Brand New Brand - 2015
