= Lars Johan Werle =

Swedish composer

Lars Johan Werle (23 June 1926 – 3 August 2001) was a Swedish modernist composer.

== Life and career ==
Werle was born in Gävle, Sweden, and taught himself how to compose, before going on to study musicology at the University of Uppsala from 1948 to 1950, and then counterpoint with Sven-Erik Bäck from 1949 to 1952 He sang in the chorus Bel Canto, was active as a jazz musician, and worked as a producer for Swedish Radio from 1958 to 1970, after which he took a professorship at the National Music Drama School, and then at the Gothenburg Music Academy starting in 1977.

Werle was known for his avant-gardist, post-Webernian composition Pentagram for string quartet that won first prize at the Gaudeamus Festival in Bilthoven in 1960. He became known for his vocal and choral music, as well as his operas, such as Drömmen om Thérèse and "Resan", the latter of which he made with psychedelic rock group Mecki Mark Men. Werle also scored the films of Ingmar Bergman Persona and Hour of the Wolf.

== Selected works ==
=== Orchestra ===
- Sinfonia da camera (1961)
- Summer Music for piano and strings (1965)
- Zodiac, ballet score (1966)
- Vaggsång för jorden (Lullaby for the Earth) (1977)

=== Chamber ===
- Pentagram for string quartet (1960)

=== Vocal ===
- Nattjakt (Night Hunt) for soprano and orchestra (1973)
- Smultronvisa for voice, flute and strings (1976)

=== Opera ===
- Drömmen om Thérèse (Dreaming about Thérèse) (1964)
- Resan (The Journey) with Mecki Mark Men (1969)
- Tintomara (1973)

== Sources ==
- Lars Johan Werle at IMDb
- Work List
