= Träd, Gräs & Stenar =

Swedish rock band

Träd, Gräs & Stenar ("Trees, Grass and Stones") is a Swedish rock band formed in 1969, from previous incarnations Pärson Sound, International Harvester and Harvester. The group was one of the front acts of the Swedish progg scene, although noticeably less political than their contemporary counterparts. Their sound has been described as raw, psych rock jam, by the writer David Pescovitz, who also notes the band would invite their audiences to improvise and collaborate.

== Background ==
=== Pärson Sound, International Harvester and Harvester ===
The band Pärson Sound was formed during the summer of 1967 by members of progg band Mecki Mark Men. Then original line up consisted of Bo Anders Persson (guitar), Thomas Tidholm (vocals, saxophone, flute), Arne Ericsson (cello), Urban Yman (violin), Torbjörn Abelli (bass) and Thomas Mera Gartz (drums). Inspired by the minimalist music of Terry Riley, the plan explored drones, heavy repetition and use of tape loops. This constellation, which were playing an experimental style of psychedelic rock never released any official records, although a collection of recordings from 1967-1968 were released as the double CD Pärson Sound (1967-68) in 2001 and as a 3 LP deluxe box set on the record label Subliminal Sounds in 2010. In August 1968 the band changed their name to "International Harvester" and later the same year their debut album Sov gott Rose-Marie was released. In 1969 the name was shortened to "Harvester", under which the album Hemåt was released. In addition to music, the band was involved with Happenings, art and theater as part of a larger group collective.

=== Träd, Gräs & Stenar ===
In the summer of 1969 the band reformed as Träd, Gräs & Stenar, now consisting of Bo Anders Persson (guitar, vocals), Torbjörn Abelli (bass, vocals), Arne Ericsson (now on keyboards and occasionally still cello) and Thomas Mera Gartz (drums, vocals); Thomas Tidholm left the band as he deemed their new material too commercial. 1970 saw the release of their self-titled debut Träd, Gräs & Stenar, sometimes called "the green album", which included cover versions of Bob Dylan's "All Along the Watchtower" and The Rolling Stones' hit song "(I Can't Get No) Satisfaction". After the release of their debut album, they were joined by guitarist and vocalist Jakob Sjöholm.

Träd, Gräs & Stenar, then consisting of Bo Anders Persson, Torbjörn Abelli, Thomas Mera Gartz, and Jakob Sjöholm, toured the United States in 2004 and 2005. Reine Fiske joined in 2008, on guitar. Abelli and Gartz died in 2010 and 2012, respectively, and were replaced by Sigge Krantz (bass, 2010) and Nisse Törnqvist (drums, 2012). Träd, Gräs & Stenar, now consisting of Jakob Sjöholm (guitar), Reine Fiske (guitar), Sigge Krantz (bass), and Hanna Österberg (drums), toured as Träden in Scandinavia and the United States in 2018.

== Personnel ==
Band names

- Pärson Sound (1967–1968)
- International Harvester (1968)
- Harvester (1969)
- Träd, Gräs & Stenar (1969–1972, 1995–2017)
- T Gås (1980–1981)
- Träden (2018– )

Current members

- Jakob Sjöholm – guitar, vocals (1970–1972, 1980–1981, 1995– )
- Reine Fiske – guitar, vocals (2008– )
- Sigge Krantz – bass, vocals (2010– )
- Hanna Österberg – drums, vocals (2017– )

Former members

- Bo Anders Persson – guitar, organ, piano, tape recorders, vocals (1967–1969, 1969–1972, 1980–1981, 1995–2008)
- Thomas Tidholm – soprano saxophone, flute, vocals (1967–1969, 1980–1981)
- Arne Ericsson – cello (1967–1969, 1969–1972, 1980–1981), keyboards (1969–1972, 1980–1981)
- Urban Yman – violin, double bass (1967–1969)
- Torbjörn Abelli – bass, vocals (1967–1969, 1969–1972, 1980–1981, 1995–2010; died 2010)
- Thomas Mera Gartz – drums, vocals (1967–1969, 1969–1972, 1980–1981, 1995–2012; died 2012)
- Kjell Westerling – violin, soprano saxophone (1968–1969)
- Nisse Törnqvist – drums (2012–2016)

== Discography ==
=== As "Pärson Sound" ===
- Pärson Sound (1967–68) (CD – 2001)
- Pärson Sound 3 LP Box Set (LP – 2010)

=== As "International Harvester" ===
- Sov gott Rose-Marie (LP – 1968)

=== As "Harvester" ===
- Hemåt (LP – 1969)

=== Träd, Gräs & Stenar ===
Sources:

- Träd, Gräs & Stenar (Trees, Gras and Stones), © 1970 Decibel Records
- Djungelns Lag (The Law of the Jungle) (live 1971), © 1972 Tall Records; reissued © 2016 Anthology Recordings with bonus tracks
- Rock för Kropp och Själ (Rock for Body and Soul), © 1972 Silence Records
- Mors Mors (Hi, How Are You) (live 1972), © 1973 Tall Records; reissued © 2016 Anthology Recordings with bonus tracks
- Gärdet 12.6.1970 (live 1970), © 1996 Subliminal Sounds
- Ajn, Schvajn, Draj (One, Two, Three) (studio 1998–2001), © 2002 Silence Records
- Hemlösa Katter (Homeless Cats) (studio 2002–07), © 2009 Gåshud/Subliminal Sounds
- Kom Tillsammans (Come Together) (live 1971–72), © 2016 Anthology Recordings; "from the same 1972 recordings as Mors Mors"
- Tack För Kaffet (So Long) (studio 2006–12), © 2017 Gåshud/Subliminal Sounds
- Träden (The Trees) (studio 2016–18), © 2018 Subliminal Sounds

== See also ==
- Träd, Gräs och Stenar's MySpace Page
- Video of live performance for the Dearraindrop art opening at the Loyal Gallery in 2006
- Träd, Gräs och Stenar's BandCamp Page
