= Blå Tåget =

Swedish progg-band

- Origin: Sweden
- Genres: Progg
- Years active: 1967–present
- Labels: MNW
- Members: Mats G Bengtsson; Torkel Rasmusson; Tore Berger; Urban Yman; Leif Nylén; Kjell Westling; Carl Johan De Geer; Roland Keijser

Blå Tåget (lit. The Blue Train) is a Swedish progg-band that used to go under the name Gunder Hägg, the name of a legendary Swedish runner, but after name conflicts occurred they changed name to Blå Tåget (which was a ride at the amusement park Gröna Lund) in 1972.

Their lyrics (mostly written by Bengtsson, Rasmusson, Berger and Nylén) cover a wide range, from marxist analysis and invitations to revolution to satire, art criticism, 1940s childhood nostalgia, images from daily life and experimental pop art works.

A recurring theme, at least in their early works, is criticism of Saltsjöbadsandan; the Swedish model of mixing capitalism with socialism through cooperation rather than conflict between government, large corporations and unions.

One song on this theme, "Den ena handen vet vad den andra gör", was covered by punk band Ebba Grön (renamed "Staten och kapitalet", with some of the lyrics omitted) and became a hit in 1980. It remains Blå Tåget's best known song today.

== Members ==
- Mats G Bengtsson - vocals, keyboard
- Torkel Rasmusson - vocals, accordion
- Tore Berger - vocals, clarinet
- Urban Yman - double bass, violin
- Leif Nylén - drums
- Kjell Westling - wind instruments, guitar, violin
- Carl Johan De Geer - trombone, accordion, vocals
- Roland Keijser - flute, saxophone

== Discography ==
As Gunder Hägg:

- 1969 Tigerkaka (Tiger cake)
- 1970 Vargatider (Tough times, literally "Wolf times")
- 1971 Glassfabriken (The icecream factory)

As Blå Tåget:

- 1972 Brustna Hjärtans Hotell (double-LP) (Heartbreak Hotel)
- 1974 Slowfox
- 1982 På Fågel Blå (live) (At the Blue Bird)
- 1988 1969-1974 (collection)
- 1999 Moderna Material (Modern Materials)
- 2004 I Tidens Rififi (In the rififi of the time)
- 2005 Inget Är Längesen 1969-2004 (collection) (Nothing is a long time ago)
