= Sov gott Rose-Marie =

Studio album by International Harvester
- Released: 1968
- Recorded: 10–12 August 1968 (side one, bonus track); September 1968 (side two)
- Venue: Nackla Aula, Stockholm (side one, bonus track); Pistolteatern, Stockholm ("I Mourn You"); Vitabergsparken, Stockholm ("How to Survive")
- Genre: Avant-garde
- Label: Love Records

Sov gott Rose-Marie (Sleep tight, Rose-Marie) is the 1968 debut album of International Harvester, the second incarnation of the Stockholm-based band Pärson Sound.

== Background ==
Pärson Sound's drone-based experimental rock sound, inspired by the Velvet Underground, Terry Riley and the Rolling Stones, was filtered through a more folky, nationally inspired sound, in hopes to "create a more temporary kind of rhythmic music that could play the same role as traditional folk music."

The push towards a national, anti-imperialist sound came with the pseudo-dystopian mindset that prevailed in the Sweden of the 1960s, something that stood in dire contrast to the 'peace and love' ethos of hippy idealism. In the mid-60s, large parts of the inner city of Stockholm, the site of many houses and homes, were bulldozed to pave way for the new architectural wave of the future: towering skyscrapers, "glass and concrete". The album, with its telling opening track of Dies Irae played on horns, aims to reflect the loss of nature in the name of human advancement. Another track, "The Runcorn Report on Western Progress", was written by the group's leader, Bo Persson, and reflects a visit to Runcorn (a suburb of Liverpool), in the summer of 1951: it hadn't rained for three months, and the pollution had turned the sky yellow, blotting out the sun. To follow this theme, the group changed its name from Pärson Sound to "International Harvester", taken from the American company that manufactured agricultural machines. To quote Swedish freelance journalist Magnus Haglund, "It meant death. Death to western culture. Death to all kinds of borders."

The first eleven pieces on the album are juxtaposition of bizarre pieces, ranging from "There Is No Other Place", which seems to take its cue from Syd Barrett-era Pink Floyd, to the slow dirges of "Sommarlåten (The Summer Song)" and "Sov Gott Rose-Marie", with tracks in between such as "Ho Chi Minh", a percussive track featuring woman chanting "Ho, Ho, Ho Chi Minh!", and the flute-based folk of "Ut Till Vänster (Out to the Left)". The remaining three tracks are live recordings of jams. "I Mourn You" once again reflects the loss of the environment in the name of western progression. The track is an ode to one of Persson's main influences, ecology philosopher and food industry researcher Georg Borgstrom. Following the more rock overtones of "I Mourn You" is the folkier, drone based "How to Survive." The bonus closing track, introduced on various reissues, clocking at nearly twenty-five minutes, "Skördetider (Harvest Times), points in the direction of the band's following release, Hemåt, under the shortened name Harvester.

== Track listing ==
Side one
No.	Title	Length
1.	"Dies Irae"	2:27
2.	"I Villande Skogen (In The Boundless Wood)"	0:47
3.	"There is No Other Place"	2:39
4.	"The Runcorn Report on Western Progress"	3:25
5.	"Statsministern"	0:18
6.	"Ho Chi Minh"	1:16
7.	"It's Only Love"	1:29
8.	"Klockan Är Mycket Nu"	3:23
9.	"Ut Till Vänster"	0:46
10.	"Sommarlåten"	2:45
11.	"Sov Gott Rose-Marie"	3:36

Side two
No.	Title	Length
12.	"I Mourn You"	12:45
13.	"How To Survive"	11:53

Bonus reissue track
No.	Title	Length
14.	"Skördetider (Harvest Times)"	24:59

== Personnel ==
- Thomas Tidholm — horns, vocals
- Bo Anders Persson — guitars, vocals
- Urban Yman — violin
- Arne Ericsson — cello
- Trobjörn Abelli — bass
- Thomas Gartz — drums

== Sources ==
- Haglund, Marcus "The History of Parson Sound – International Harvester and Harvester" found in the cd booklets of International Harvester: Sov gott Rose-Marie and Harvester: Hemat. Swedish translation at
