= Swedish Society for Nature Conservation =

Swedish non-profit environmental organization

- Naturskyddsföreningen
- Abbreviation: SSNC
- Formation: 1909; 117 years ago
- Founder: Multiple founders
- Legal status: Active
- Purpose: Creating awareness and project for environmental protection
- Location: Sweden
- Members: 230,000 (2019)
- General secretary: Karin Lexén
- Chairman: Johanna Sandahl
- Subsidiaries: Nature and Youth Sweden
- Budget: SEK 192.4 million (2012)
- Website: www.naturskyddsforeningen.se
- Formerly called: Svenska Naturskyddsföreningen

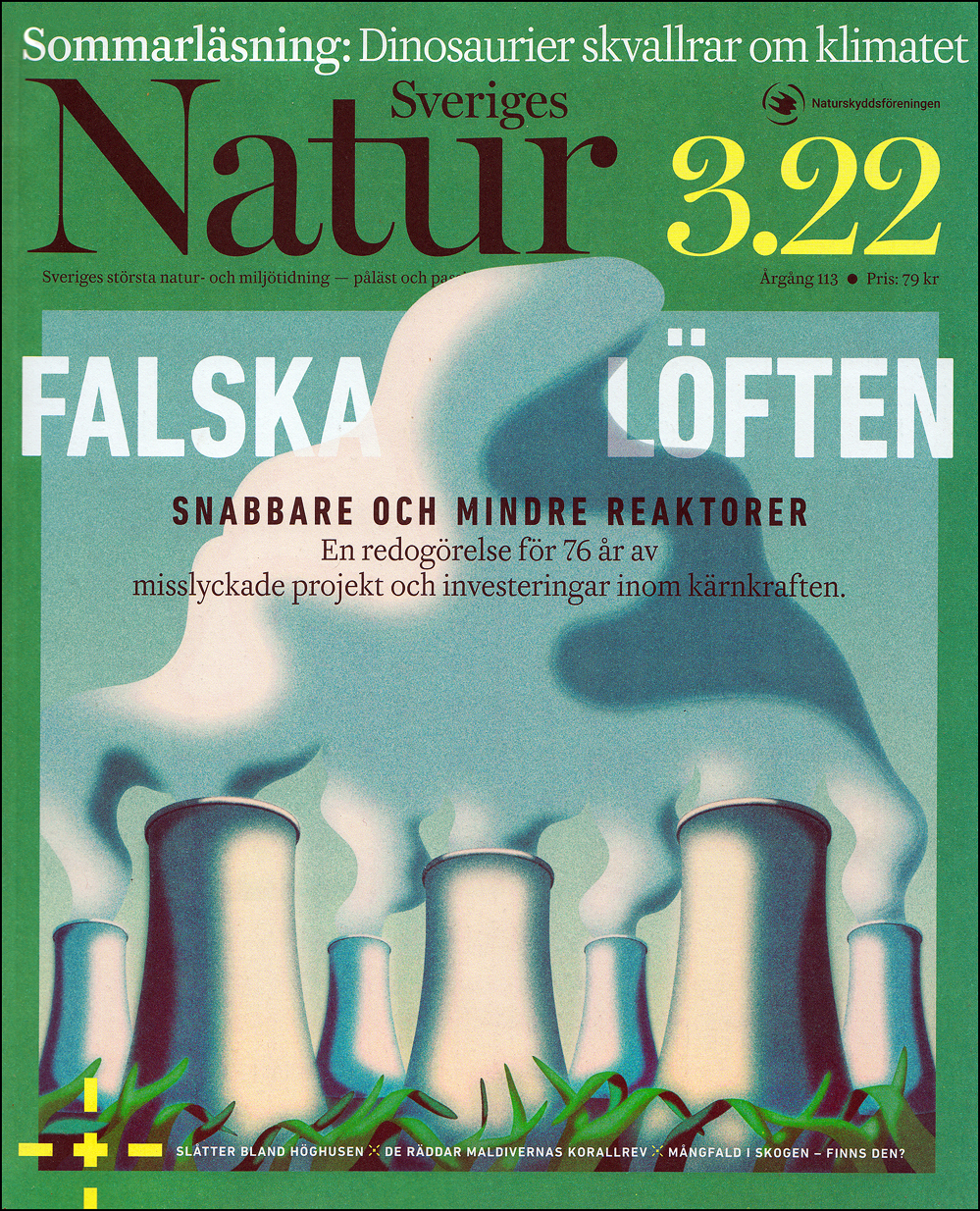
Sveriges Natur.

The Swedish Society for Nature Conservation (Swedish: Naturskyddsföreningen, previously known as Svenska Naturskyddsföreningen, SNF) is a non-profit, non-partisan, Swedish environmental organization. It is the largest and oldest environmental society in Sweden, with 24 county branches and 270 municipality subdivisions. In 2019, it had 230,000 members.

== History ==
The society was formed in 1909, by a number of professors and academics interested in natural history and environmental issues. One of the founders was botanist Rutger Sernander, who had a prominent position in the society until his death in 1944. Writer Sten Selander was chairman of the society for many years. Mikael Karlsson was chairman in 2002–2014, succeeded by Johanna Sandahl who had been vice chairman.

During the first decades, the society mainly worked with protecting selected natural sites and endangered species. It also published a journal, Sveriges natur ("Swedish nature"). As new environmental problems developed, the work of the society has changed. The organization was instrumental in establishing large parts of modern environmental legislation in Sweden, as well as forming government agencies like the Environmental Protection Agency.

== Function ==
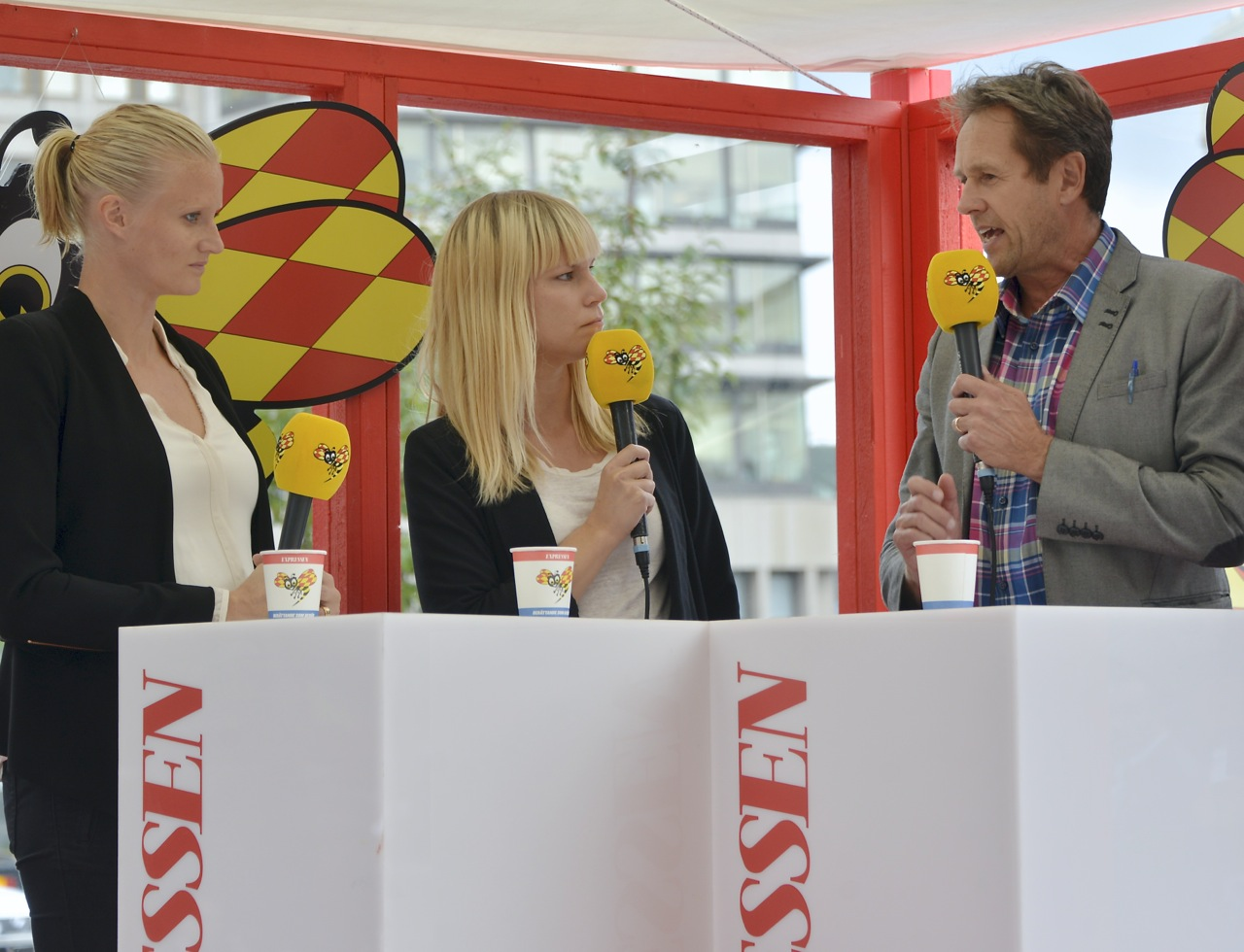
Former General Secretary Svante Axelsson and board member Carolina Klüft during the Swedish election campaign in September 2014.

The Society for Nature Conservation works strengthening public awareness for environmental issues, experiencing nature and love for nature, (Note: The Swedish expressions naturkänslan ("experiencing nature") and kärleken till naturen ("love for nature") are Swedish cultural aspects that are almost impossible to translate into other languages.) as well as influencing political decisions and interact with other international organizations. The society cooperates with other environmental organizations within the European Union and it is also twinning with organizations in the Far East, Africa and South America with support from the Swedish International Development Cooperation Agency (Sida).

The organization manages the Alvin Fund jointly with the Environmental Protection Agency and the Swedish Ornithological Society. The fund contributes to projects involved in nature protection, primarily bird protection.

A significant part of the society's work is to, through consumers, influence manufacturers and commerce to take a more active responsibility for the environment. The organization initiated the annual Miljövänliga veckan ("Eco-friendly Week") in 1990, and the ecolabels Bra Miljöval ("Good Eco-choice") and Naturens Bästa ("Nature's Best").

== Symbol ==
The symbol for the Society for Nature Conservation is a peregrine falcon, one of the species strongly affected by pollution. The society has helped save the peregrine in Sweden by contributing to breeding programs and surveillance of nests and habitats.

== Sveriges Natur ==
Sveriges Natur (Sweden's Nature) has been the Swedish Society for Nature Conservations member magazine since 1910, Erik Halkjær is the magazine's editor-in-chief and publisher. Sweden's Nature has been awarded the Guldspaden from the Swedish Association of Investigative Journalism 2017 and 2018.

== Fältbiologerna ==
The Nature and Youth Sweden (Fältbiologerna lit. Field Biologists) is an independent youth organization formed in 1947 for youth interested in nature studies and environmental protection, under the aegis of the Society for Nature Conservation. The Field Biologists have a mixed range of activities, ranging from birdwatching and lichen classes to environmental campaigns, climate and fairness actions, and forest inventory. A significant aspect of the organization is that the members themselves select and organize the activities.
