= Knutna nävar =

- Origin: Gothenburg, Sweden
- Genres: Progg
- Years active: 1970s
- Labels: Proletärkultur

Knutna nävar was a communist progg band from Gothenburg, Sweden. They were active during the 1970s.

Some of their works are Swedish renditions of classical left-wing songs such as "The Internationale" and "Whirlwinds of Danger". In addition, some of the melodies for their works are inspired by other songs with alternative lyrics such as their song "Strejken på Arendal" whose melody is inspired by the American folk song "John Hardy "

== Discography ==
- 1971 – Internationalen och andra revolutionära arbetarsånger
- 1972 – Dom ljuger
- 1972 – Vi slåss för vår framtid
- 1973 – Hör Maskinernas Sång
- 1973 – De svarta listornas folk
