= Shakane =

Former UK musical group

Force West, later known as Shakane, was an English, Bristol-based pop band of the 1960s and 1970s.

Formed in 1964, Force West was a five-piece pop band from Bristol UK. Originally created from the amalgamation of two local bands, Danny Clarke and the Jaguars and Johnny Dee and the Diatones. Original members were Charlie Dobson (aka Danny Clarke - Lead vocals), John (Sid) Phillips (Drums and Vocals), Adrian Castillo (Guitar and Vocals), John Strange (Bass Guitar and Vocals) and Mike Hewer (Guitar and Vocals). Hewer was replaced by Brian Trusler in 1965.

Eight Force West singles were released between 1965 and 1969, but no commercial success was forthcoming.

In 1969, following the release of a final single Sherry, a cover of the classic Four Seasons hit, lead vocalist Charlie Dobson decided to leave the band and venture into the world of business. The remaining four band members took the name "Shakane" and reinvented their sound and image.

Signed to Miki Dallon's Youngblood label under the management of Jim Buckingham and Kink’s manager Robert Wace, Shakane enjoyed some success with the singles Big Step and Love Machine on the European mainland but UK success passed them by. In 1972 a chance meeting at a local gig resulted in Shakane becoming the House Band at the Towns Talk night club on the Bridgewater Road in Bristol. This uncontracted engagement eventually lasted for some seventeen years. In January 1984 bass player John Strange decided to leave the band and after working their way through a number of itinerant players Shakane engaged ex Hot Dog Jackson guitarist Bob Pedrick as replacement.

Shakane finally disbanded in 2014 for health reasons - bringing to an end a musical journey that had lasted for 50 years.

== Discography ==
=== UK singles ===
Force West

- Can't Give What I Haven't Got / Why Won't She Stay (Decca F12223) 1965
- Gotta Find Another Baby / Talkin' About Our Love (Columbia DB7908) 1966
- When The Sun Comes Out (The Weather Man) / Gotta Tell Somebody (Columbia DB7963) 1966
- All The Children Sleep / Desolation (Columbia DB8174) 1967
- On A Quiet Night / The Room Revolves Around Me (as The Oscar Bicycle) (CBS 3237) 1968
- I'll Walk In The Rain / What's It To Be (CBS 3632) 1968
- Like The Tide Like The Ocean / I'll Be Moving On (CBS 3798) 1968
- Sherry / Mr. Blue (CBS 4385) 1969
- Big Step / Rhona (as Shekane [sic]) (UPC 103) 1970
- Rhona / Find The Lady (as Shakane) (UPC 110) 1970
- Love Machine / Mr. Jackson (as Shakane) (Young Blood International YB 1004) 1972
- Jenny / Gang Man (as Shakane) (Rockfield / United Artists UP 36087) 1976

=== Extended plays ===
- Split EP with Mecki Mark Men (JUKEbox, 1972)
