= Mecki Mark Men =

Swedish progressive rock group

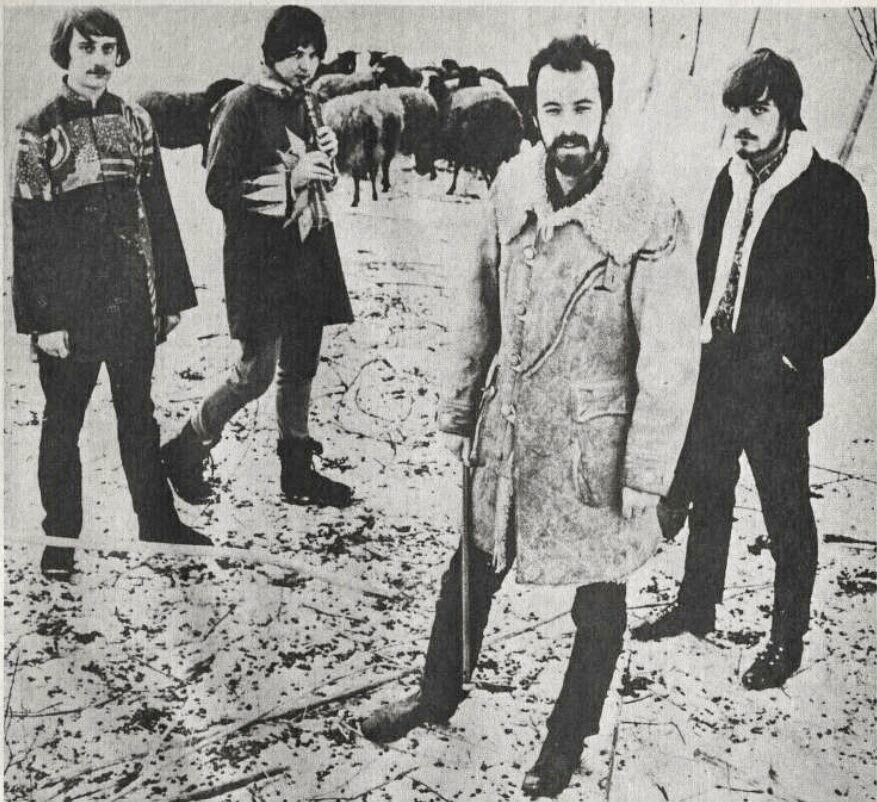

Background information
- Origin: Stockholm, Sweden
- Genres: Psychedelic rock, jazz-rock, hard rock, progressive rock, progg, rock opera
- Years active: 1967–1979; 2000; 2007; 2010
- Labels: Philips; Limelight; Sonet; Kompass; Vesper
- Past members: Mecki Bodemark; Hans Nordstrom; Anders Sjostedt; Claes Swanberg; Jan-Eric Olsson; Björn Fredholm; Thomas Gartz; Kenny Håkansson; Bella Linnarsson; Pelle Ekman; Bosse Svensson; Staffan Linros; Peter Sahlin; Janne Kullhammar; Henry Uilli; Tommy Koverhult; Anders Nilsson; Tarja Omhav; Daniel Wigstranol; Peter Sahlin; Johan Sjokvist

Mecki Mark Men (MMM for short) were a Swedish rock band fronted by keyboardist Claes "Mecki" Bodemark. The group originally formed as a dansband in the mid-1960s, then called Mecki Mark Five, before adopting elements of psychedelic rock, jazz, and experimental music. A breakthrough performance at Stockholm's Experimental Jazz Festival in July 1967 helped establish the group, placing them at the forefront of Swedish psychedelic rock and its fledgling progg subgenre.

Mecki Mark Men went on to collaborate with other artists in the genres of pop music, opera, and musical theatre, and were one of the first Swedish rock acts to tour and release records in the U.S.

== History ==
=== Origins ===
Mecki Mark Men were founded by Swedish keyboardist Claes Bodemark. Bodemark's career began after he acquired his first Hammond L-100 organ at age 17 and then landed a job as studio organist for a Stockholm television station in the early 1960s. By the middle of the decade he was known as "Mecki," a name the long-haired musician shared with the Mecki the Hedgehog, an impudent, bristle-haired, vest-wearing character who was often given to smoking opium in children's comic books and had appeared in stop motion puppet films shown to troops during World War II.

In the early 1960s Bodemark played in Stockholm groups The Adventurers and Nilla and the Blackbird, and a popular Finnish group called Savages. In 1966 he appeared on two singles by Örjan Englund's pop group Vat 66 before devoting himself as bandleader on his own Mecki Mark Five, which would become the more alliterative Mecki Mark Men (MMM).

=== First lineup: 1967–early 1968 ===
Mecki Mark Men's original 1967 lineup was a septet of two horns (Hans Nordström on tenor sax and flute, and Anders Sjostedt on trumpet), two guitars (Claes Svanberg on six-string electric and Jan-Eric Olsson on bass), two drummers (Björn Fredholm and Thomas Mera Gartz, the latter of whom also played vibraphone, bamboo flute, tenor saxophone, and sitar), and Mecki Bodemark on Hammond organ, vibraphone, flute and vocals. The group was one of the first big psych-rock bands in Sweden. MMM, along with the improvisational rock trio Baby Grandmothers, served as a house band at Stockholm's famous Filips club run by Janne Carlsson of the instrumental music duo Hansson & Karlsson. MMM first entered the studio in September 1967 to record their premiere single, "Midnight Land" b/w "Got Together," after which Sjostedt and Olsson left the group. The following month Mecki Mark Men's residual five members went into Stockholm's Philips Studios to create their eponymous debut album. A tour of the U.K. and an appearance on the BBC television program Popside soon followed.

By late 1967 the band had shrunk to the quartet of Bodemark, Nordstrom, Svanberg and Gartz for a tour of Finland with the Baby Grandmothers and Finnish singer Anki Lindqvist. In January 1968 Mecki Mark Men and Baby Grandmothers opened for the Jimi Hendrix Experience for the Swedish leg of Hendrix's European tour during a hiatus in the Electric Ladyland recording sessions. Jimi Hendrix had become acquainted with MMM on previous visits to Klubb Filips and he was regularly performing his own version of the Hansson and Karlsson tune "Tax Free." Hendrix played short sets on the tour due an injury from smashing a plate glass hotel window, but his forearm bandaged, he regularly jammed with the Mecki Mark Men when their bands were warming up for gigs. That year Mecki Mark Men also opened for Frank Zappa and the Mothers of Invention at Stockholm's Concert House. Because of Mecki Bodemark's Jimi-soundalike vocal style and his band's heavy, unpredictable and esoteric music, MMM often drew comparisons to both Hendrix and Zappa, even from those unaware of the artists' various associations.

This iteration of Mecki Mark Men soon split up, with some members going on to found other Swedish bands. Gartz, who had been MMM's secondary songwriter, formed the quintet Pärson Sound, a project that originally came together to perform Terry Riley's composition, In C. Pärson Sound soon rebranded themselves as International Harvester, and then as Harvester, before settling on the name Träd, Gräs & Stenar ("Trees, Grass and Stones"), who became a staple of Swedish progg music in the early 1970s.

=== Second lineup: late 1968–1971 ===
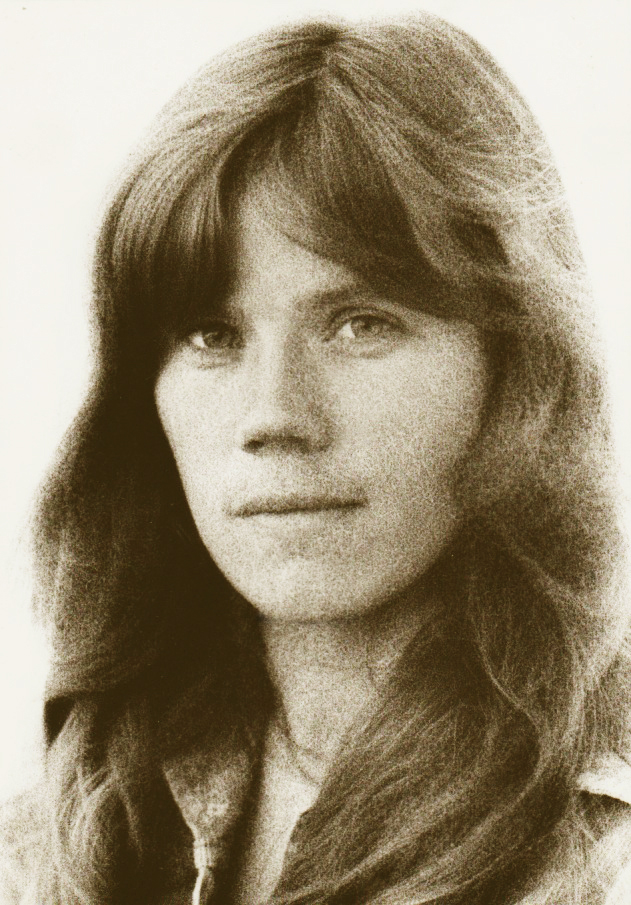
Finnish singer Anki Lindqvist who was frequently backed by the Mecki Mark Men on tours around Europe

1968 marked a big shift in Swedish youth culture as political protests erupted all over Europe. Demonstrations against the Vietnam War had started in Sweden the previous year, and future prime minister Olof Palme marched against it in his capacity as Minister of Education. Many Swedes were also involved in campaigns in support of the environment or against apartheid. On May 3 activists protested the participation of apartheid nations Rhodesia and South Africa in the international Swedish Open tennis competition held in the resort town of Båstad, resulting in a violent clash between Swedish police and demonstrators. A calmer protest at Stockholm University led students to occupy their Student Union Building at Holländargatan for four days. Amidst all this Mecki Bodemark landed a role in a mainstream reflection of activist and hippie counterculture when he, protest singer Hawkey Franzén, and the three members of Baby Grandmothers were musicians and cast members in Hår, the Swedish version of the popular musical Hair. The musical ran at Stockholm's Scalateatern from September 1968 through April 1969, playing a total of 155 shows, and the cast recorded a Swedish language version of the soundtrack with Bodemark and the others as the backing band.

During Hår's Christmas break, Bodemark and the Baby Grandmothers toured again with Finnish singer Anki Lindqvist, this time to Prague, accompanied by avant garde musician M. A. Numminen. They arrived to a city still occupied by Soviet tanks from the Warsaw Pact invasion of Czechoslovakia that had followed the Prague Spring. The band played several clubs backing Lindqvist and then playing selected songs from Hair (in English) mixed with experimental music. Their last gig in Prague was a huge concert to some 10,000 people, ending with a sing-along to "Let the Sunshine In." Before returning to Sweden, the band made appearances on Czechoslovak radio and TV as a follow-up to their concert success. Shortly after MMM's departure, Czechoslovakia's government began its campaign of Normalization. The country's mánička (the Czech term for hippie) counterculture and affiliated music was persecuted by the state and forced underground.

Meanwhile, MMM's first album had been issued in 40 countries, including an American edition released in the summer of 1968 by Mercury imprint Limelight Records. Earlier in the decade Limelight had been managed by Quincy Jones, who booked luminary jazz artists like Art Blakey, Dizzy Gillespie, Earl Hines, Milt Jackson, Gerry Mulligan, and Oscar Peterson. To keep up with the rapid shifts in the counterculture of the 1960s, Limelight's aesthetic and catalogue also shifted, expanding beyond its repertoire of hard bop and cool jazz to include Indian classical music and many European electronic and new music composers, such as Dutch experimentalists Tom Dissevelt and Kid Baltan, France's Pierre Henry and Les Percussions de Strasbourg, and Sweden's own Bengt Hambraeus. Mecki Mark Men, who sang in English about politically relevant topics such as the war in Vietnam, became the label's sole rock act.

Limelight's remixed and repackaged U.S. release of Mecki Mark Men did reasonably well for an unknown European group, selling 20,000 copies stateside. After seeing a performance of Hår, a Mercury Records A&R representative expressed interest in releasing a second Mecki Mark Men album for Limelight. Upon finishing their seven-month run with Hår, Bodemark asked the Baby Grandmothers to become his new Mecki Mark Men, and the re-dubbed quartet returned for another tour of Finland. This less jazzy-sounding band of Kenny Håkansson on guitar, Bengt Linnarsson (a.k.a. Bella Fehrlin) on bass, and Pelle Ekman on drums backed Bodemark for MMM's sophomore release, Running in the Summer Night. Recorded over the course of a few days in early 1969, the album mixes Bodemark's songs with material previously composed by the Baby Grandmothers. Critics have hailed the album, some citing it as an early work of proto-heavy metal, predating Black Sabbath's debut by one year.

Mecki Mark Men made a promotional film for the songs "Running In The Summer Night" and "Being Is More Than Life," which aired on the Swedish TV program Kram: Tema Att Lyssna in May 1969. By the fall of 1969, the band's popularity in their home country garnered them numerous TV appearances, another U.K. tour, and a collaboration with the Royal Swedish Opera on Lars Johan Werle's work Resan (translated as "Journey" or "The Trip"). Rasan's libretto by Lars Runsten depicted a suburban woman's everyday life in contrast with the fantastic world of her childhood friend, reflecting the rifts between post-war European society and the burgeoning counterculture seeping in from America and Britain. In the program notes, Werle wrote that Resan was "An opera about people of today; about the children of the welfare state; our lack of contact with one another; our loneliness and blindness and pretensions. It also depicts the difficulties we experience in visualizing existence—our own and others." For the performance, the Mecki Mark Men and various orchestral soloists were situated in illuminated cubes and fit into a larger program of classical music. In 1970 Mecki Mark Men also performed the opera with the Norrköping Symphony Orchestra.

In 1970 Mecki Mark Men were heralded as the first Swedish rock band to embark on a tour of the U.S. For three months they made the city of Chicago their home base, from which they travelled to various other cities to play festivals with Sly and the Family Stone, Jethro Tull, Pentangle, Mountain, Grand Funk Railroad, Paul Butterfield, The Byrds, Bob Seger, and Muddy Waters. The tour ended in disarray, as the band had overstayed their visas and racked up a considerable debt. The group's manager bailed them out financially by picking up the band's tab and arranging for the recording of their third album, Marathon, at Chess Studios in Chicago. Their manager also convinced Finnair to fly the band home on credit. The group had hoped that their U.S. tour would help bolster sales and maintain their record deals with Limelight and Phillips, but it didn't, and both labels dropped the group. Marathon was released by the Swedish label Sonet, which had also issued the soundtrack to Hår, and the royalties from this third Mecki Mark Men album were used to reimburse the Mecki Mark Men's manager. Ironically, Marathon's Lead track bears the title, "I've Got No Money."

In 1971 Mecki Mark Men returned for a second collaboration with pianist Lars Johan Werle and a handful of other musicians on Werle's ballet Stonehorse, which was recorded but went unreleased for nearly 40 years. Also in 1971, MMM appeared in Ingvar Kjellson's documentary about Werle, En Saga om Sinnen ("A Tale of the Senses"). The group's second lineup soon dissolved, with all but Mecki Bodemark going on to play in the folk rock progg group Kebnekajse.

=== Mecki Mark and third lineup: 1972–1980 ===
In 1972 the Swedish Jukebox label issued the first three songs from Marathon on a split 7-inch EP with the British band Shakane, the last record to be released by MMM for several years. Mecki Bodemark teamed up with members of the Swedish band Red White & Blues under the name "Mecki Mark" (dropping "men" from their moniker) but that collaboration proved short-lived. Both Bodemark and bassist Bella Linnarsson returned as collaborators in a theatrical production based on Dante's Divine Comedy. This was then adapted into the 1975 film Skärseld (Purgatory) with Bodemark playing the role of Casella and featuring music by Pink Floyd.

In 1974 MMM's original trumpeter Anders Sjöstedt returned to work with Bodemark in a new version of Mecki Mark Men, gradually forming the group with Bosse Svenssonon playing tenor sax, Staffan Linros on guitar, Peter Sahlin on bass, and Janne Kullhammar at the drum kit for the recording of the 1979 soft rock, smooth jazz, and soul-inspired album Flying High. Around the album's release, the group played concerts in protest of nuclear power. A video for the song "Fly High" was released in conjunction with the album before this third iteration of the band dissolved in 1980.

=== Reissues and reunions ===
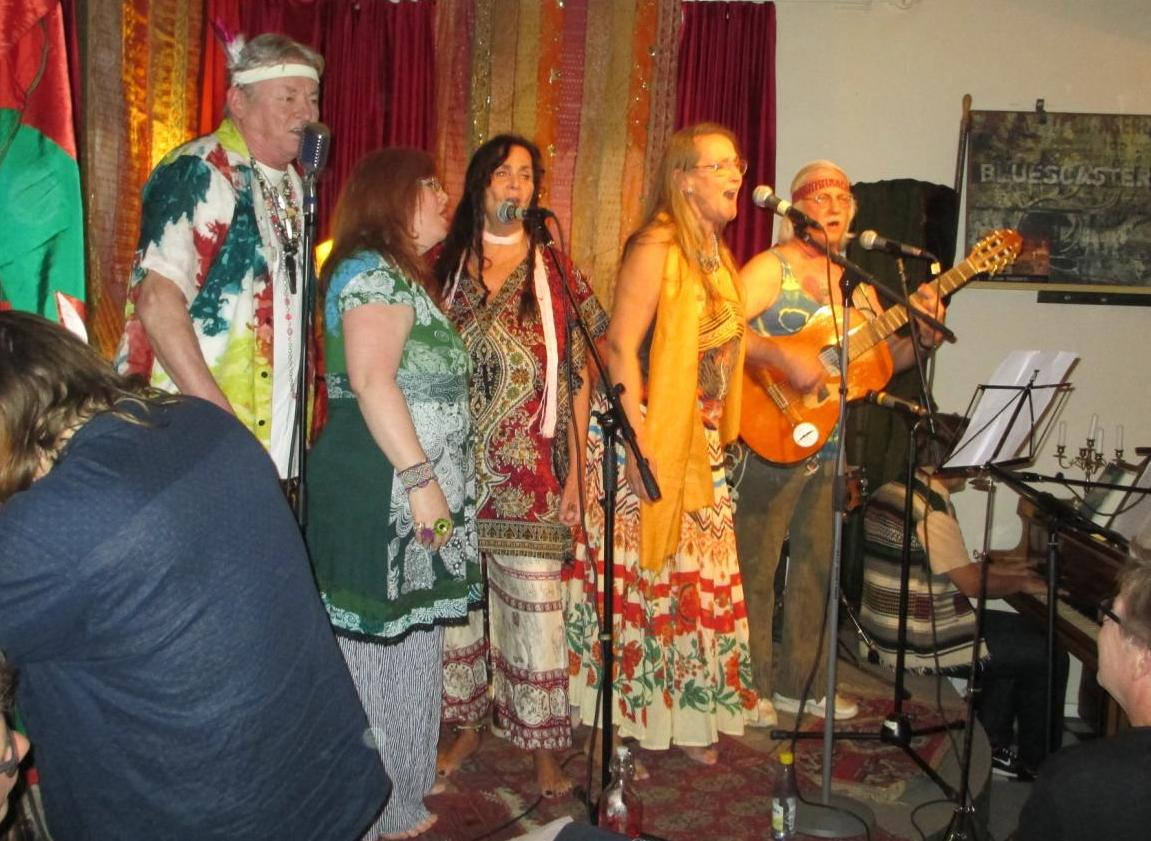
The cast for 1968's production of Hår at a reunion in 2015

Between 2004 and 2008 Universal Music reissued Mecki Mark Men's first three albums on compact disc. Universal included MMM's first single and two instrumental versions of songs with the first album, and added U.S. mixes of two songs as bonus tracks to the Swedish mix of the second album. In 2007 Bodemark and his girlfriend, Tarja Omhav, reformed a new band under the Mecki Mark Men name. The group of Henry Uilli on guitar, Peter Sahlin on bass, Tommy Koverhult on sax, Anders Nilsson on trumpet, Daniel Wigstranol on pedal steel and Johan Sjokvist on drums joined Bodemark and Omhav in the studio to record the band's fifth album, Livingroom. This lineup also took part in a day-long boat concert on the Baltic Sea between Stockholm, Sweden and Turku, Finland. Mecki Mark Men reformed again in 2010 to support the CD release of Stonehorse, MMM's 1971 collaboration with Lars Johan Werle.

In 2015 the French Record label Lumpy Gravy re-reissued MMM's first three albums on CD, keeping Universal's four bonus tracks for Mecki Mark Men, including five alternate versions of songs on Running in the Summer Night, and adding six live tracks to the release of Marathon. In 2016 much of the original 1968 cast of Hår reunited to reenact the musical in Stockholm, but no members of the Mecki Mark Men performed.

== Discography ==
Group lineups on each release indicated as follows:

^{a} First lineup (seven members)
^{a-} First lineup, minus two members
^{b} Second lineup (four members)
^{b+} Second lineup with additional musicians
^{c} 1979 lineup (six members)
^{d} 2007 lineup (eight members)

=== Albums ===
- Mecki Mark Men LP (Philips, 1967; Limelight, 1968)^{a-}
- Running in the Summer Night LP (Limelight, 1969)^{b}
- Marathon LP (Sonet, 1971)^{b}
- Flying High LP (Kompass, 1979)^{c}
- Living Room CD (Vesper, 2007)^{d}
- Stonehorse CD (Vesper, 2010)^{b+}

=== Singles ===
- "Midnight Land"/"Got Together" (Philips, 1967)^{a}
- "Sweet Movin'"/"Love Feeling" (Philips/Limelight, 1968)^{a-}
- "Get Up"/"Sweet Movin'" (Philips Japan, 1968)^{a-}

=== Extended plays ===
- Split with Shakane (Jukebox, 1972)^{b}

=== Related ===
- Hår: American Hippie-Yippie Love-In Musical LP (Sonet, 1968)^{b+}

=== Compact disc reissues ===
- Running in the Summer Night (Universal, 2004 +2 bonus tracks; Lumpy Gravy, 2015 +5 bonus tracks)^{b}
- Marathon (Universal, 2006 original track list; Lumpy Gravy, 2015 +6 live tracks)^{b}
- Mecki Mark Men +4 bonus tracks (Universal, 2008; Lumpy Gravy, 2015)^{a-/a}
