= Nikke Ström =

Swedish rock musician (1951–2026)

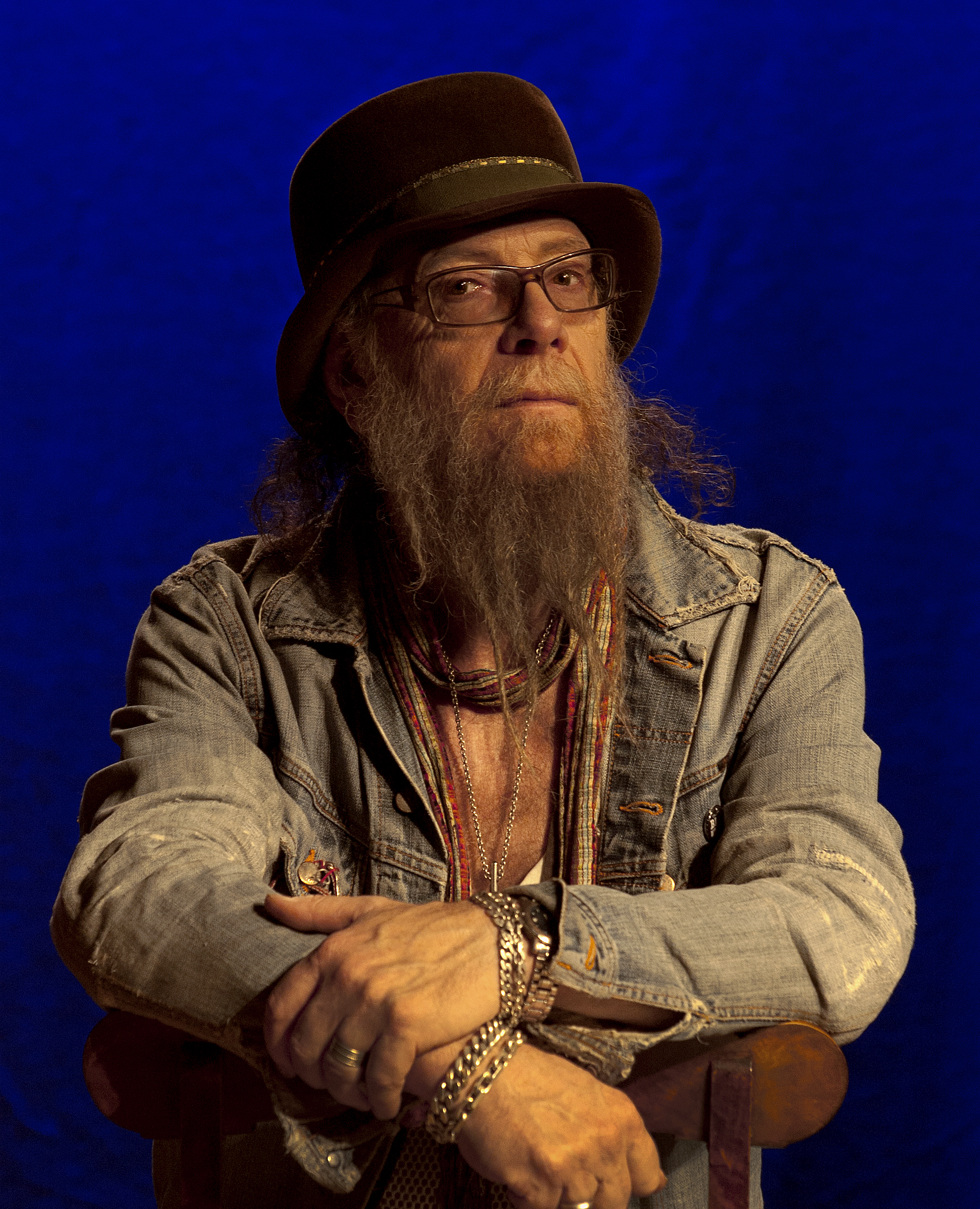
- Ström in 2013

Background information
- Born: 8 June 1951; Karlskoga, Sweden
- Died: 8 June 2026 (aged 75)
- Genres: Rock
- Occupation: Musician
- Instrument: Bass guitar
- Formerly of: Nationalteatern

Nikke Ström (8 June 1951 – 8 June 2026) was a Swedish rock musician, mostly known as the bassist in Nationalteatern.

== Life and career ==
Ström was born and raised in Karlskoga, where he played in different bands. In the beginning of 1970 he studied philosophy at Stockholm University. He became politically active in the leftist movement against the Vietnam War, and was the chairman of the FNL group in his hometown of Karlskoga.

He moved to Gothenburg in 1971 and played in different leftist progressive rock bands, including Nynningen. He participated in the Tent Project (Tältprojektet), a musical theater performance on the history of the Swedish working class, which toured the country in the summer of 1977, and the same year he joined Nationalteatern as a bass player in the "rock orchestra".

Ström died from complications from heart surgery on 8 June 2026, at the age of 75.
