= Henric Holmberg =

Swedish actor, director and scriptwriter (1946–2026)

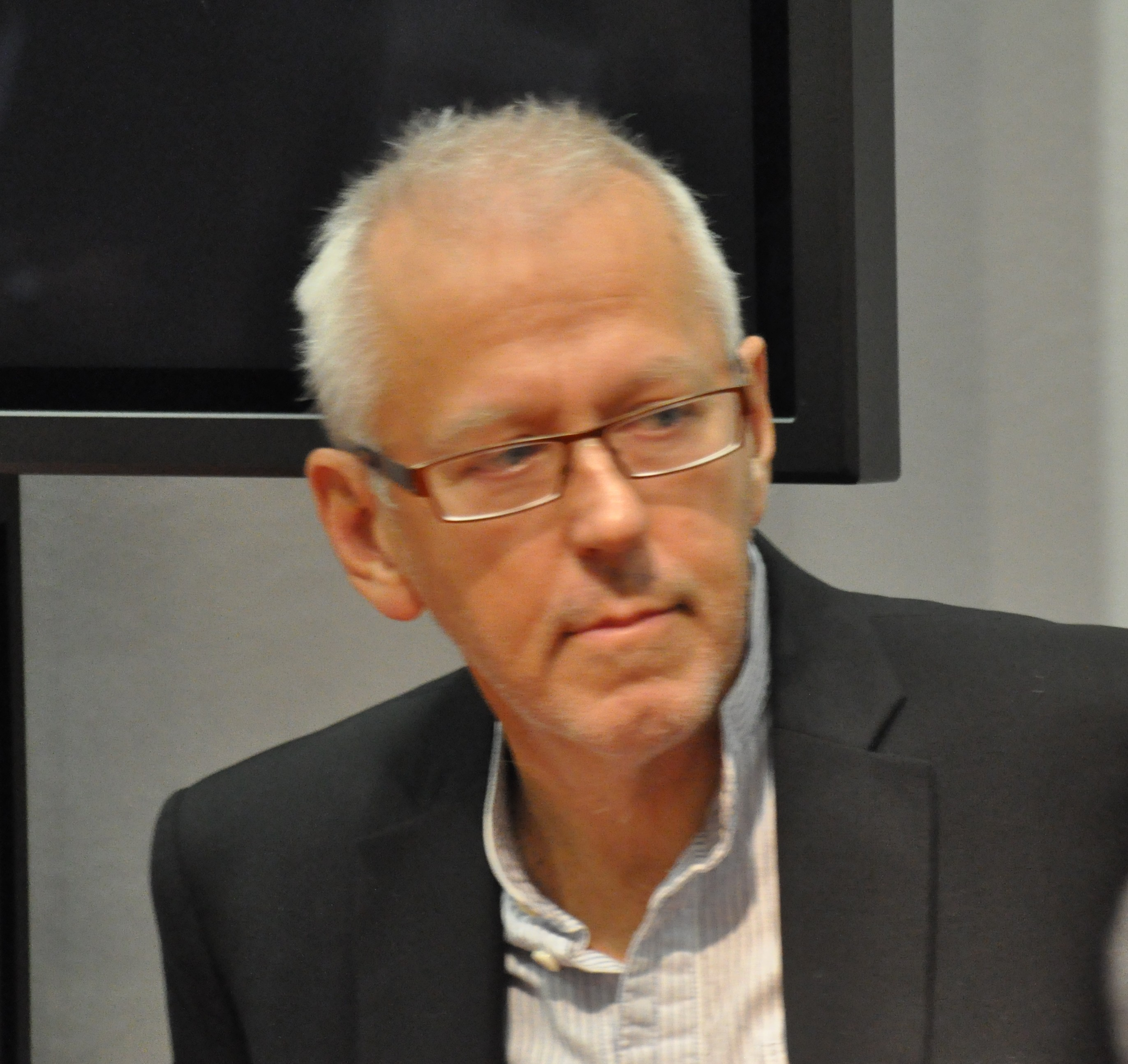
- Holmberg in 2011
- Born: Sven Martin Henrik Holmberg; 4 January 1946; Växjö, Sweden
- Other name: 10 February 2026 (aged 80)

Sven Martin Henric Holmberg (4 January 1946 – 10 February 2026) was a Swedish actor, director and scriptwriter.

== Life and career ==
He had his breakthrough role in Sven Klang's Combo (1976). Holmberg started acting in different leftist theater groups, and in 1977 he participated in the Tent Project, a musical theater performance on the history of the Swedish working class movement, in which he had played the role of the Swedish Communist leader Zeth Höglund.

He played many historical parts. He portrayed Rutger Macklean in Macklean, a 1993 drama show for Sveriges Television. Holmberg also portrayed Adolf Hitler in the play Albert Speer at Gothenburg City Theatre in 2001, which was also later aired on television.

Holmberg died on 10 February 2026, at the age of 80.

== Sources ==
- "Henric Holmberg" (in Swedish). Swedish Film Institute.
