= Med Reventberg =

Swedish actress (1948–2021)

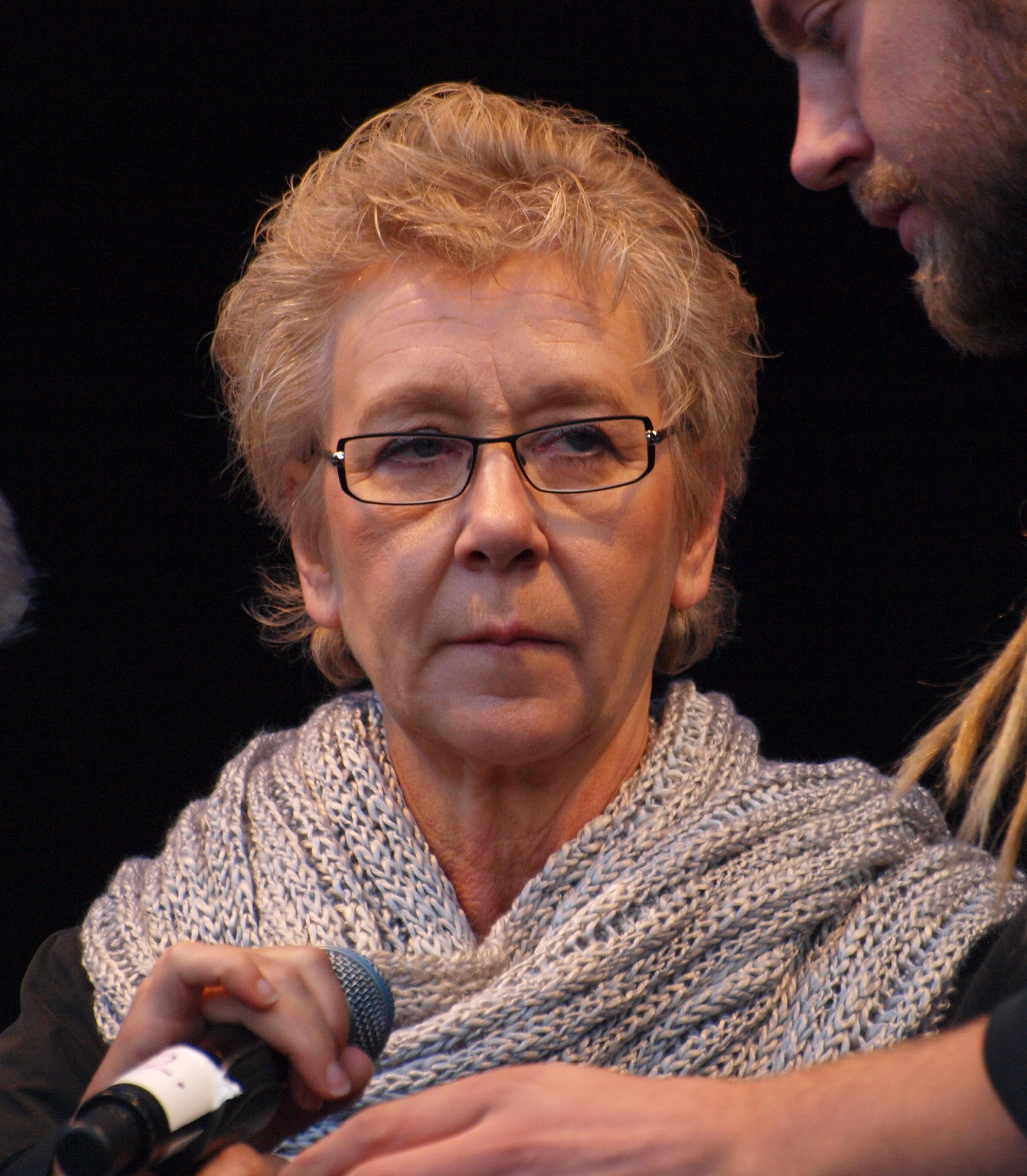
- Reventberg in 2010
- Born: Inga Margaretha Ida Reventberg; 7 June 1948; Nyköping, Sweden
- Died: June 23, 2021 (aged 73)
- Occupations: Actress; director

Inga Margaretha Ida "Med" Reventberg (7 June 1948 – 23 June 2021) was a Swedish actress and director.

Inga Margaretha Ida Reventberg was born on 7 June 1948 in Nyköping. In the 1970s, she was a founder of leftist theater and music group Nationalteatern. From 2005–2013, she was theatre and artistic director of the Västerbottensteatern.

Med Reventberg appeared in many Swedish films and television productions, mostly in minor roles.

Reventberg died on 23 June 2021, at the age of 73.
