= Hemåt =

Studio album by Harvester
- Released: 1969
- Recorded: November 1968 ("Bacon Tomorrow"); 2 February 1969 ("Nepal Boogie"); 2 June 1969 ("När Lingonen Mognar"); 6-10 May 1969 (remainder)
- Venue: Konstfackt Festival, Stockholm ("Bacon Tomorrow"); Vitabergsparken, Stockholm ("När Lingonen Mognar"); Kafé Marx, Stockholm (remainder)
- Genre: Psychedelic rock
- Length: 41:01; 48:49 (reissue)
- Label: Decibel

Hemåt is a 1969 studio album by the Swedish psychedelic rock band Harvester.

Hemåt is the band's first and only release under the name "Harvester." A year after the release of Sov gott Rose-Marie the band shortened its name from "International Harvester" to "Harvester". The album is composed by musicians Bo Anders Persson, Thomas Tidholm, Urban Yman, Kjell Westling, Arne Eriksson, Torbjörn Abelli, Thomas Gartz and Ulla. Hemåt continued its predecessor's move towards a nationalist music that was both politically and environmentally charged. The album was recorded in "Kafe Marx", a small cafe owned by the youth league of the Swedish Communist Party.

== Track listing ==
All songs written by Harvester, except "Kristallen Den Fin" and "Kuk-Polska" (traditional, arr. by Harvest), and "Everybody Needs Somebody to Love" (Bert Berns, Solomon Burke and Jerry Wexler).

1. "När Lingonen Mognar" (When the Lingonberries are Ripen) - 3:24
2. "Kristallen Den Fina" (Beautiful Crystal) - 6:28
3. "Kuk-Polska" (Cock-Polska) - 2:46
4. "Nepal Boogie" - 8:13
5. "Everybody Needs Somebody to Love" - 7:22
6. "Bacon Tomorrow" - 6:33
7. "Och Solen Går Upp" (And the Sun Rises) - 6:33
8. "Hemåt" (Homeward) - 7:47 [reissue bonus track]

== Personnel ==
Musicians

- Bo Anders Persson – guitar
- Thomas Tidholm – horns, vocals
- Arne Eriksson – cello
- Urban Yman – violin
- Kjell Westling – violin
- Torbjörn Abelli – bass
- Thomas Gartz – drums
- Ulla Berglund – small cymbals

Technical

- Anders Lind – recording engineer (at Kafé Marx)
- Bengt Göran Staaf – recording engineer (at Kafé Marx)

== Sources ==
- Haglund, Marcus "The History of Parson Sound - International Harvester and Harvester" found in the cd booklets of International Harvester: Sov gott Rose-Marie and Harvester: Hemat.
