= Sulo (singer) =

Swedish vocalist and songwriter (born 1969)

- Born: Sören Karlsson; 17 September 1969 (age 56); Katrineholm, Sweden
- Genres: Rock, garage rock, country, power pop, punk, pop
- Occupations: Musician, songwriter
- Instrument: Vocals
- Labels: Smilidon, Legal Records
- Website: Official MySpace

Sören "Sulo" Karlsson (born 17 September 1969) is a Swedish vocalist and songwriter, most known for being the frontman of the rock band Diamond Dogs. In 2013, he started the English power pop band The Crunch, together with Dave Tregunna on bass (from Sham 69 and The Lords of the New Church), Mick Geggus on guitar (from Cockney Rejects), Swedish Idde Schultz (Docenterna) and Terry Chimes on drums (original member of The Clash also played with Generation X and Black Sabbath).

== Career ==
Sulo, who was born in Katrineholm, Sweden, co-founded The Diamond Dogs in Katrineholm along with Anders Lindström, throughout the years the band's line up has changed several time and Lindström left the band in 1996 to join The Hellacopters. In 2007, Sulo reunited with Lindström with the musical project The Bitter Twins, the duo's released their debut album Global Panic in 2008, which featured many guest musicians. Besides his work with The Diamond Dogs and The Bitter Twins, Sulo has recorded as a solo artist where he has interpreted poetry by the Swedish author and poet Ernst Brunner, with the Swedish actor and author Per Ragnar, together with Swedish singer, Idde Schultz. Sulo's latest band is The Crunch, which formed in 2013.

In 2015 Sulo released (Lionheart) an album with Swedish singer Kikki Danielsson "Postcards from a Painted lady" where he has written and produced the whole album.

In 2016 Sulo released through Cargo records "Punk Rock Stories & Tabloid Tales" where he puts music to Gary Johnsons poems.

8 of April 2016 Sulo also released (Capitol Music Group) the country influenced duet album "Sulo's Brilliant Outsiders". The album is written by Sulo and English producer Kevin Porée and features duet partners Sam Gleaves, Bellamy Brothers, Chris Spedding, Terry Reid, Janis Ian, Idde Schultz, Paul Brady, Paul Young, Maria McKee, Clare Teal, Linda Gail Lewis, Rissi Palmer and Kikki Danielsson.

== Discography ==
- The Diamond Dogs – Blue Eyes Shouldn't be Cryin' (1993)
- The Diamond Dogs – Honked (1994)
- The Diamond Dogs – Good Time Girl (1995)
- The Diamond Dogs – Need of Ammunition (1996)
- Blancflor – Sånt man inte pratar om (2000)
- The Diamond Dogs – Among the Nonbelievers (2000)
- The Diamond Dogs – As Your Green Turns Brown (2001)
- The Diamond Dogs – Shortplayer (2001)
- Blanceflor – Låtsaslycklig (2001)
- The Diamond Dogs – Too Much is Always Better than Not Enough (2002)
- As a solo artist – Rough Diamonds (2003)
- The Diamond Dogs – That's the Juice I'm On (2003)
- The Diamond Dogs – Black River Road (2004)
- As a solo artist – Just Another Guy Tryin' (2005)
- The Diamond Dogs – Up The Rock (2006)
- The Diamond Dogs – Cookin (2008)
- As a solo artist – Hear Me Out (2008)
- The Diamond Dogs – Most Likely (2008)
- As a solo artist – Sulo möter Brunner (2008)
- The Bitter Twins – Global Panic (2009)
- As a solo artist – I månen på mattan (2009)
- The Sam Cook concerts – Soul Folks (2009)
- The Diamond Dogs – The Grit and the Very Soul (2010)
- Sulo & Idde – Ur ett brev (2010)
- Sulo & Idde – Kocksgatan revisited (2011)
- The Diamond Dogs – Set Fire to It All (2012)
- Sulo & Idde – Skriv ditt namn i eld (2012)
- Sulo & Idde – Diamant Hund (2012)
- Keep Yourself Alive – (2012)
- The Crunch – Busy Making Noise (2013)
- The Crunch - Brand new brand (2015)
- Kikki Danielsson - Postcard from a painted lady (2015)
- Punk Stories and Tabloid Tales (Lyrics by Garry Johnston) (2016)
- Sulo's Brilliant Outsiders (2016)
