= Baby Grandmothers =

Swedish psychedelic rock music group

Background information
- Origin: Stockholm, Sweden
- Genres: Psychedelic rock
- Years active: 1967-1968
- Label: Eteenpäin
- Spinoff of: The T-Boones
- Past members: Kenny Håkansson; Pelle Ekman; Göran Malmberg; Bengt “Bella” Linnarsson; Erik “Kapten” Dahlbäck; Mecki Bodemark

The Baby Grandmothers were a Swedish psychedelic rock band formed in Stockholm, Sweden, in 1967. Established after the dissolution of the R&B band, the T-Boones, the group enjoyed a cult following as the house band at the popular psychedelic music club Filips. Although the Baby Grandmothers rarely performed outside Sweden, the band did tour alongside Jimi Hendrix in 1968. In the same year, the group recorded an album's worth of material, which appeared years later on their eponymous album. The album is now considered an underground classic of experimental psychedelia.

== History ==
With origins traced back to the T-Boones, a R&B group formed in 1965, the band became a popular live fixture on the Swedish club circuit. Self-producing their debut single later in the year, the T-Boones released their best-known work "At the Club", which has since become a rare collector's item of Swedish garage rock. In 1966, the band was joined by Kenny Håkansson (lead vocals, lead guitar) who explained how he first encountered the group: "My group The Agents needed a new singer and when I heard rumours about the T-Boones splitting up I contacted their much talented singer and songwriter Kjell Lagerström. The T-Boones weren’t breaking up though but the contact was made and this led me to join them instead". Hakannson, along with bandmates Pelle Ekman (drums) and Göran Malmberg (bass guitar), recorded their second single "Don't You Ever Leave Me", a softer composition in comparison to their early work.

Hakansson was forced to depart the T-Boones to register for military service, during which time the band recorded an unreleased single in his absence. Upon Hakannson's return, the band recorded their final single, "I Want You", in early-1967. Also around this time, Malmberg began an interest in experimental electronics, leading him to develop the group's amplifiers, and a square-shaped bass drum made entirely of metal for Ekman. They became the residential band at clubs such as Cobalibreé and Lärkan, before moving to the prominent jazz rock venue the Golden Circle. Malmberg decided to further pursue his interest in guitar and PA systems, leaving the T-Boones in late-1967 to establish his own business. He was subsequently replaced by Bengt “Bella” Linnarsson. In August 1967, one of the earliest clubs devoted to psychedelic music, Filips, was opened and required an additional group to play along with the duo, Hansson and Karlsson. Erik “Kapten” Dahlbäck, former bandmate of Linnarsson, became the new drummer, and the group was rechristened the Baby Grandmothers.

Performing at Filips, Baby Grandmothers played mainly long-running, improvised instrumentals. According to Hakannson: "These 'songs' originally started off as being one slow number moving into a faster one. They were originally called 'Georges Slow' and 'Georges Fast'. The vocal parts, if there were any, was mainly me 'howling' the occasional melody”. Among the patrons that spectated at the band's performances was record producer M.A Numminen, who had hoped to record an album with Baby Grandmothers immediately after discovering them; yet, the project would not commence until a year later. With help from the band, Filips became a happening venue for fans of the underground music scene, hosting many other groups including Blossom Toes.

In December 1967, Filips was forced to close—four months after its opening—as a consequence of a demolition-site. Eager to support the Baby Grandmothers, club manager Bill Öhrström booked the group, along with fellow Swedish musical act the Mecki Mark Men, on a Scandinavian tour with the Jimi Hendrix Experience. Although brief, the tour is notable for an incident involving Jimi Hendrix at a hotel in Gothenburg. Hendrix was found in a pool of blood after destroying his room, an event which manager Öhrström witnessed. In March 1968, the group initiated a Finnish tour, during which time they recorded their debut single in a radio station with Numminen. The record, "Somebody Keeps Calling My Name" was described by Numminen as "so original and direct. It had a unique focus that was created between them".

Released in May 1968 on the record label Eteenpäin, "Somebody Keeps Calling My Name" was limited to 300 copies, lost today along with unreleased tracks from the same recording sessions that developed the single. When the group returned to Sweden, Mecki Bodemark, whose Mecki Mark Men had disbanded, joined Baby Grandmothers as the keyboardist. Although it was not immediate, the band became the second formation of the Mecki Mark Men, one of the first Swedish rock groups to tour the United States. The band recorded two albums in 1970 before breaking-up in the following year.

In 2007, Subliminal Records released Baby Grandmothers, an album which combines studio recorded and live material. On the subject of Swedish psychedelic rock bands, music critic Craig Hayes of PopMatters described the album as "one of the finest heavy psych reissues of the last decade, and its catacomb-echoing rawness only adds to all the intrigue. Baby Grandmothers launch into drones, avant-garde dirges, and fevered hard rockin’ wig-outs throughout the album, and the entire LP is as heavy lidded as it is heavily overblown with jams rocketing into surreal spheres".

== Discography ==
=== Single ===
- "Somebody Keeps Calling My Name" b/w "Being Is More Than Life" – Eteenpäin (Eteenpäin GN-5), 1968

=== Album ===
- Baby Grandmothers – Subliminal Sounds (SUB-TILCD23), 2007
