= Ulf Dageby =

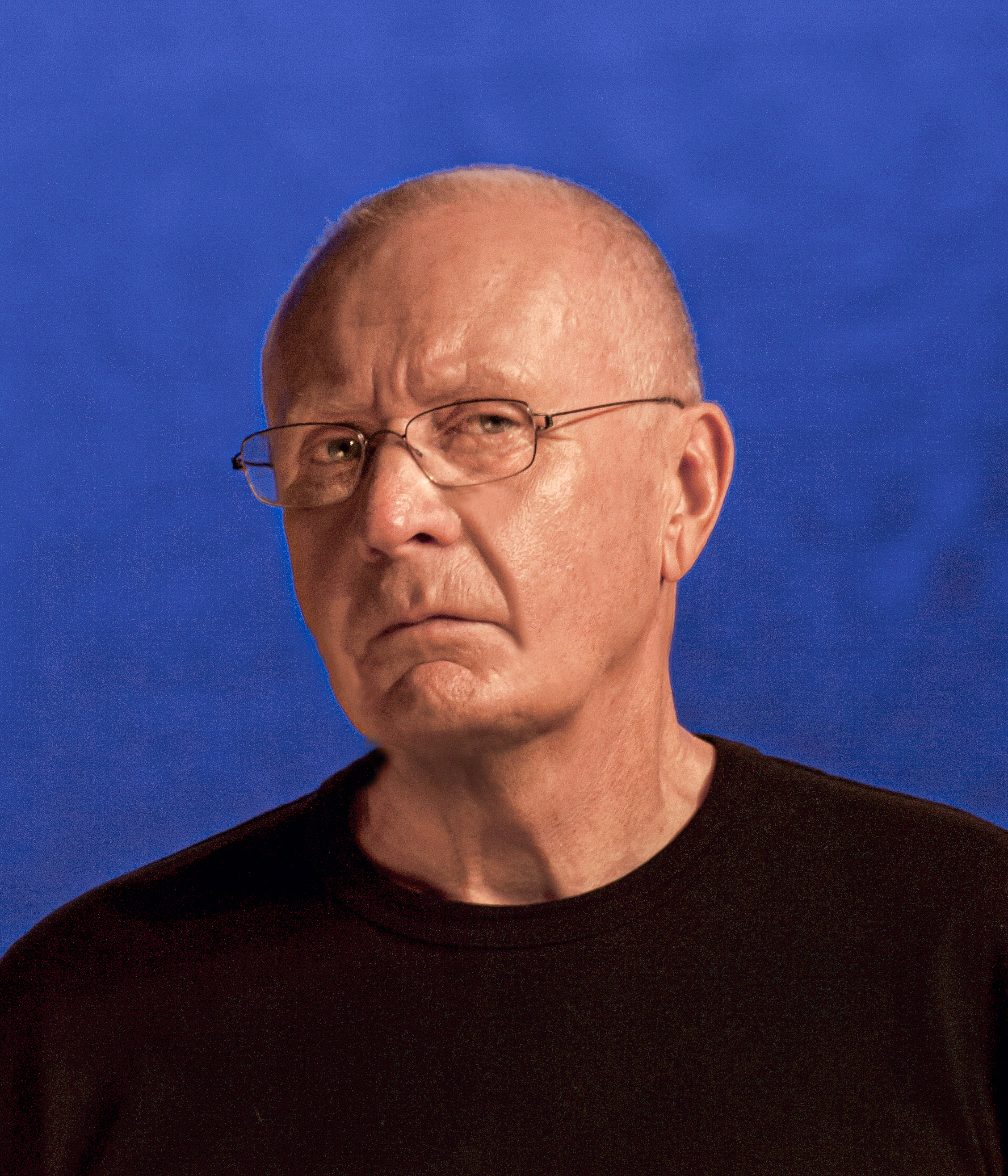
- Ulf Dageby in 2013

Background information
- Birth name: Ulf Thorbjörn Dageby
- Also known as: Sillstryparn
- Born: 10 May 1944; Gothenburg, Sweden
- Died: 16 July 2024 (aged 80)
- Genres: Progg; rock; blues
- Occupations: Musician; songwriter
- Instruments: Vocals; guitar; harmonica; percussion
- Years active: 1971–2024
- Labels: MNW; Nacksving; Bonnier; Amalthea; Amigo
- Formerly of: Nationalteatern; Tältprojektet

Ulf Thorbjörn Dageby (10 May 1944 – 16 July 2024) was a Swedish rock musician, singer and songwriter. Dageby was best known for his role in the leftist "rock orchestra" and theater ensemble Nationalteatern, which toured for the final time in 2022. At the 18th Guldbagge Awards he won the Special Achievement award.

== Biography ==
Dageby was born and grew up in Gothenburg, attended secondary school at Hvitfeldtska and early on his interest in music grew from jazz music, through Bob Dylan to a more rock’n’roll oriented sound. He joined Nationalteatern in 1971 as guitar player and soon became the leading member when it came to writing the group's songs, such as "Barn av vår tid" (Children of Our Time) and "Bara om min älskade väntar", a Swedish translation of Bob Dylan's "Tomorrow is a long time". In 1975 Dageby appeared under the pseudonym "Sillstryparn" at the "Alternativfestival" – an alternative to the Eurovision song contest – performing "Doin the omoralisk schlagerfestival" ("Doin' the Immoral Schlager festival"). He was also one of the main songwriters in Tältprojektet (The Tent Project), a musical theater performance on the history of the Swedish working class, which toured the country in mid 1977. Dageby made his debut as a solo artist in 1983 with the album En dag på sjön. In addition to his solo work and the many reunions with Nationalteatern, Dageby wrote music for Swedish film and television.

Dageby died on 16 July 2024, at the age of 80, leaving behind his wife Anki and three children.

== Discography ==
=== With Nationalteatern ===
- 1972 – Ta det som ett löfte.....ta det inte som ett hot
- 1974 – Livet är en fest
- 1976 – Kåldolmar och Kalsipper
- 1977 (with Nynningen) – Vi kommer leva igen
- 1978 – Barn av vår tid
- 1979 – Rockormen
- 1980 – Rövarkungens ö
- 1991 – Nationalteatern rockorkester LIVE
- 2006 – Nationalteatern rockorkester LIVE

=== Solo albums ===
- 1983 – En dag på sjön
- 1984 – Lata rika
- 1986 – Minnen från jorden
- 1989 – Känsliga soldater

=== Singles ===
- 1981 – Togges Gossar; Barflickans Längtan/En Hälsning Till Våren
- 1984 – Mitt Hus Är Försvunnet!/Mitt Rum
- 1989 – Barn/Underbara Rum
- 1990 – Dansar/Dansar (på en söndag)

=== Compilations ===
- 1992 – Neonskogen/soundtracks 79–92
- 1995 – Underbara Rum
- 2002 – 18 sånger – en samling

=== Film music ===
- 1979 – Ett anständigt liv
- 1985 – Själen är större än världen
- 1987 – Hotet
- 1989 – Täcknamn Coq Rouge
- 1993 – Rosenbaum. Målbrott
- 1997 – Beck
- 1997 – Beck – Mannen med ikonerna
- 1997 – Beck – Pensionat Pärlan
- 1997 – Slussen
- 1997 – Beck – Spår i mörker
- 1998 – Beck – The Money Man
- 1998 – Beck – Monstret
- 1998 – Beck – Vita nätter
- 1998 – Beck – Öga för öga
- 2001 – Kommissarie Winter – Sol och skugga
- 2003 – Om jag vänder mig om
