= Turid =

Turid is a Norwegian feminine given name. Notable people with the name include:

- Turid Balke (1921–2000), Norwegian actress, playwright and artist
- Turid Birkeland (1962–2015), Norwegian cultural executive and politician for the Labour Party
- Turid Hundstad (born 1945), Norwegian civil servant
- Turid Iversen (1934–2026), Norwegian politician for the Conservative Party
- Turid Karlsen, Norwegian operatic soprano and voice teacher who has had an active international performing career since the 1980s
- Turid Knaak (born 1991), German footballer
- Turid Leirvoll (born 1956), Norwegian and Danish politician who was Party Secretary of the Socialist Left Party from 1993 to 2001
- Turid Kjellmann Pedersen (1937–2012), Norwegian politician for the Labour Party
- Turid Rugaas, Norwegian dog trainer
- Turid Sannes (born 1942), Norwegian handball player
- Turið Sigurðardóttir (born 1946), Faroese educator, writer and translator, specializing in the history of Faroese literature
- Turid Smedsgård, Norwegian former handball goalkeeper
- Turid Thomassen (born 1965), Norwegian politician who was party leader of the Norwegian left-wing party Red from 2010 to 2012
- Turid Torkilsdottir (c. 960 – c. 1047), powerful influential woman during the Viking Age in the Faroe Islands
- Turid Dørumsgaard Varsi (born 1938), Norwegian politician for the Labour Party

== See also ==
- TURYID
- Tiurida
- Tubrid
- Turd
