= Doktor Kosmos =

Swedish pop band

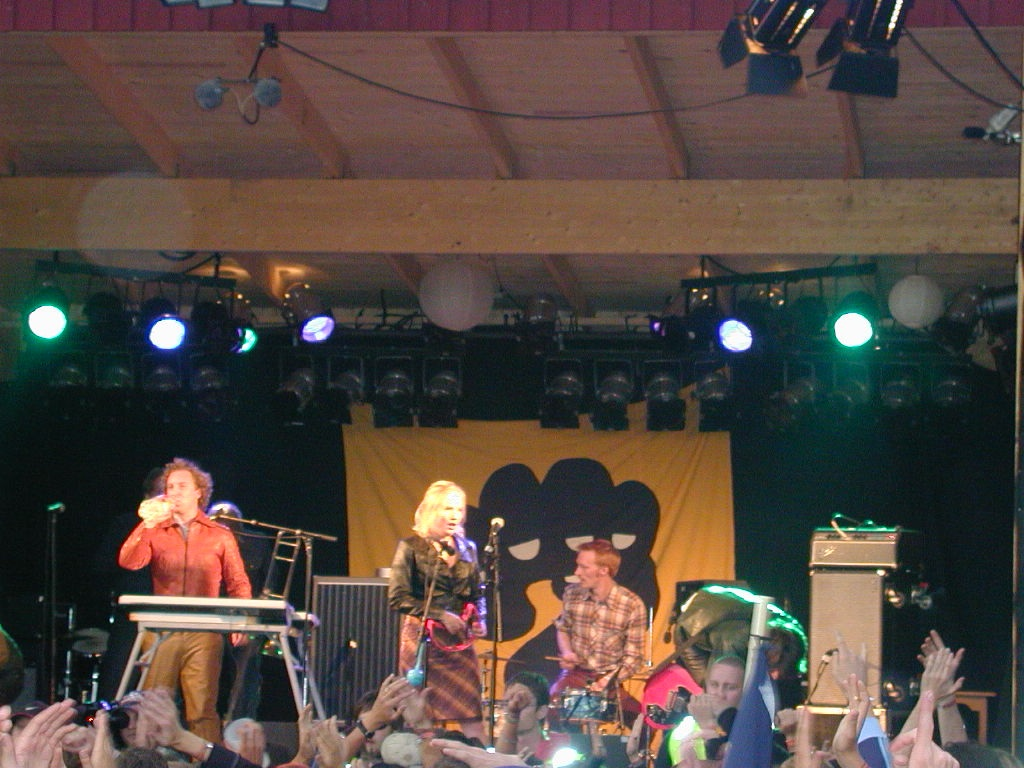
Doktor Kosmos at Emmabodafestivalen in 2001

Doktor Kosmos is a Swedish pop band best characterized by the unique style of their humorous lyrics. The lyrics often have social or political themes, and the band is socialist, although not above making fun of their own opinions.

One of the gimmicks of the band is recurring characters in their songs. One of these is "Doktor Kosmos" himself ("Doktor Kosmos" simply means "Doctor Cosmos" in Swedish). Doktor Kosmos is at the same time the stage name for the band's front man Uje Brandelius.

== History ==
Doktor Kosmos was founded in 1991 in Uppsala. The original line-up was Uje Brandelius (synth, vocals), Martin Aagård (guitar), Lina Selleby (vocals) and Catti Larson (vocals). Soon afterwards, Henrik Högberg joined the band on drums.

In 1995, the band released their first album, Socialmedicin. It was followed by Stjärnjerry in 1996. Stjärnjerry is a rock opera that tells the story of a young man, "Stjärnjerry", who gets into trouble. He owes his drug dealer money and when he can't pay, he buys a gun and shoots the dealer. The story continues in "Evas Story", in which we follow Jerry's Girlfriend, Mördarbruden Eva (The Killer Chick Eva).

After a longer period of inactivity the band released a new album for the first time in 11 years in 2019, followed by a tour in 2022.

== Members ==
- Uje Brandelius, synthesizer, vocals
- Catti Brandelius
- Lina Selleby, synthesizer, vocals
- Anders Bennysson, guitar, synthesizer
- Martin Aagård, guitar, bass guitar, synthesizer
- Henrik Svensson, drums

== Discography ==
=== Albums ===
- 1995: Socialmedicin
- 1996: Cocktail
- 1996: Stjärn Jerry - en rockopera
- 1997: Single of the Week (Together with 'Friend')
- 2000: Evas Story
- 2002: Reportage!
- 2005: Ett enkelt svar
- 2008: Hallå?
- 2019: Hej Alla Barn

=== Tapes ===
- 1994: Doktor Kosmos och Starlightorkestern
- 1998: Rymderevolution!
- 1998: For Freaks Only

=== Singles ===
- 1999: Le Punkrocker
- 2001: Jag låg med henne i Tjeckoslovakien
- 2001: Känslorna
- 2001: Jimi Tenor och Kennet Johnsson
- 2005: När min pojke går på stan
- 2006: Assburner (ep)
