= Nature and Youth Sweden =

- Fältbiologerna
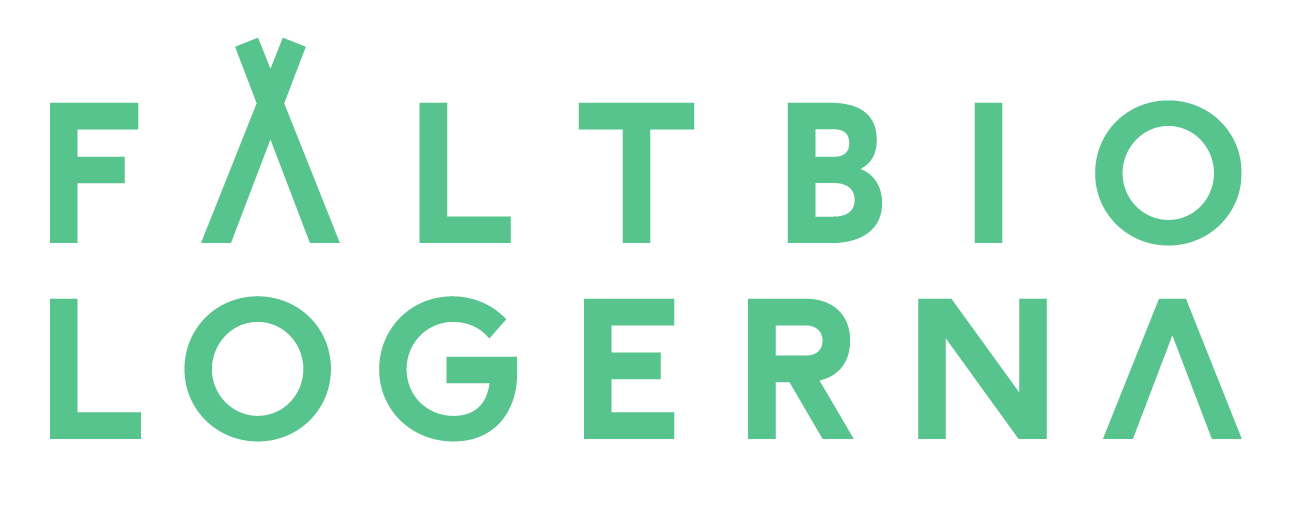
- Formation: 1947; 79 years ago
- Type: Environmental organization
- Legal status: Active
- Purpose: Educate and inspire children and young adults about environmental issues
- Location: Sweden
- Chairperson: Tobias Larsson
- Parent organization: Swedish Society for Nature Conservation
- Website: faltbiologerna.se

Nature and Youth Sweden (Swedish: Fältbiologerna, literally "the field biologists") is a Swedish organisation for youth interested in nature studies and environmental protection founded in 1947 associated with the Swedish Society for Nature Conservation.

The association works with issues related to environment, sustainability, and nature's rights, and carries out various types of activities such as excursions, inventories, discussion forums, actions and meetings. The organization operates all over Sweden, the largest district being Fältbiologerna Stockholm-Uppland-Gotland. The association is run by and aimed at young people aged 6 to 25.

== Activities ==
The members have a mixed range of activities, ranging from birdwatching and lichen classes to environmental campaigns, climate and fairness actions and forest inventory. A significant aspect of the organization is that the members themselves select and organize the activities. One of the traditional annual highlights is the National Annual Meeting (Swedish: Riksårsmöte) arranged during the first week of January, and the Öland-camp which is held in Grönhögen in southern Öland during one of the long weekends in May.

In several locations, youths also run Minifältis-operations. The operations are led by a group of organization members. The members start a club for children aged 6–12 and organize activities for them.

=== The magazine Fältbiologen ===
Nature and Youth Sweden's magazine, Fältbiologen, focuses on topics regarding nature, research, and environmental issues, and has published several important texts on topics such as forestry preservation. Fältbiologen is published with 2-3 issues a year. All members of Nature and Youth Sweden receive an issue; schools and other interested parties are also able to subscribe to the magazine, and it is available at libraries throughout Sweden. The magazine is produced by a non-profit editorial group.
