= Nationalteatern =

Swedish rock group

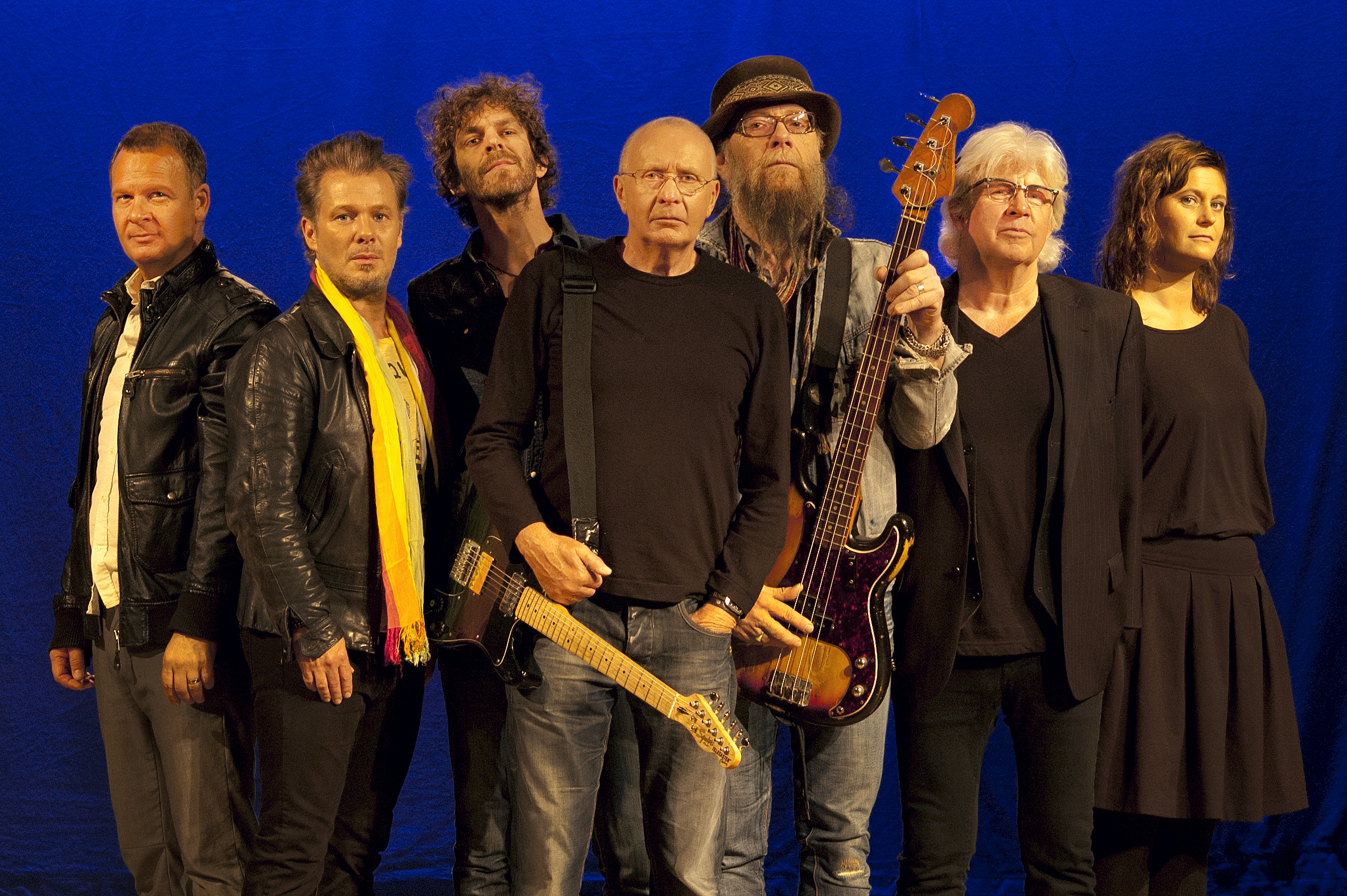
- Nationalteatern in 2013. From left to right: Ulf Stenberg, Håkan Svensson, Mattias Hellberg, Ulf Dageby, Nikke Ström, Håkan Nyberg, Matilda Sjöström.

Background information
- Origin: Gothenburg, Sweden
- Genres: Progg, rock, blues
- Years active: 1968–present
- Labels: MNW, Nacksving, Amalthea, Bonnier Amigo
- Members: Håkan Nyberg; Mattias Hellberg; Håkan Svensson; Jaqee Nakiri
- Past members: Full list
- Website: Official website

Nationalteatern is a Swedish progg rock group from the 1970s that featured leftist political lyrics. It was originally a traveling theater ensemble with many members, most notably Ulf Dageby, Anders Melander, Totta Näslund, Nikke Ström, Hans Mosesson and Pale Olofsson.

== History ==
Initially formed as a free theater group in Lund in 1969, Nationalteatern moved to Gothenburg and started to put heavy emphasis on the musical part of the plays. The leader of the group in the early days was Anders Melander, who also played most of the instruments on the group's debut album, Ta det som ett löfte...ta det inte som ett hot (Take it as a promise...don’t take it as a threat). On the second album, Livet är en fest (Life is a party), Ulf Dageby was allowed more creative room, and he later evolved into the group's driving force. The album was a more straightforward rock album than the previous one, a formula that proved very successful.

In 1977, many members of Nationalteatern played a significant part in The Tent Project. The next year saw the release of Barn av vår tid (Children of our time) – the first album featuring Totta Näslund – and still later Rövarkungens ö (The Island of the Bandit King). After 1980, the group moved away from the theatrical work and concentrated on music, calling themselves a rock orchestra. The group dissolved soon afterward, but the new millennium has seen several reunions of Nationalteatern, touring all over Sweden, even after Totta Näslund died in 2005. No new songs or albums have yet been recorded.

In 2002 a tribute album, Nationalsånger - Hymner från Vågen och EPAs torg, was released, featuring several of Sweden's most famous musicians (such as Backyard Babies, The Hellacopters, The Soundtrack of Our Lives, Lisa Miskovsky, and The Ark) performing Nationalteatern songs.

Their music, which was composed to the plays the group wrote and performed at youth community centers in Sweden, was written in a youth-in-trouble-theme, often containing an anti-drug message.

== Band members ==
=== Current members ===
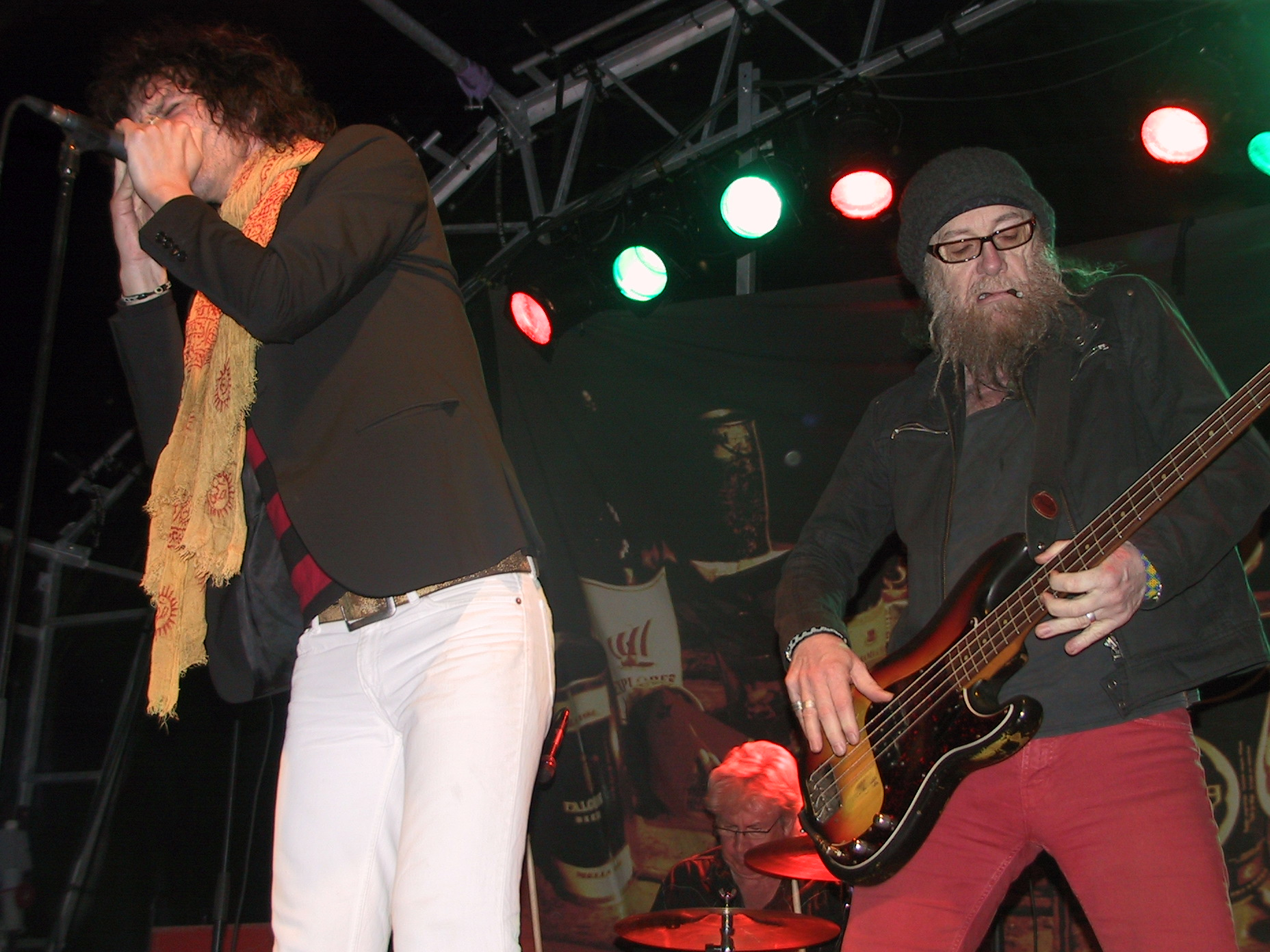
Vocalist Mattias Hellberg and bassplayer Nikke Ström performing live in 2007

- Håkan Nyberg - Drums, percussion
- Mattias Hellberg - Vocals, harmonica
- Håkan Svensson - Guitars
- Jaqee Nakiri - Vocals

=== Former members ===
- Nikke Ström
- Ulf Dageby
- Bernt Andersson
- Bengt Blomgren
- Lars-Erik Brossner
- Kurt Bünz
- Inga Edwards
- Göran Ekstrand
- Bertil Goldberg
- Maria Grahn
- Anna Guttorp
- Peter Guttorp
- Lars Jacobsson
- Jussi Larnö
- Sonja Lund
- Anders Melander
- Per Melin
- Hans Mosesson
- Totta Näslund
- Pale Olofsson
- Anki Rahlskog
- Med Reventberg
- Ulf Stenberg
- Peter Wahlqvist
- Håkan Wennberg
- Hans Wictorsson

== Discography ==
=== Albums ===
- Ta det som ett löfte.....ta det inte som ett hot (1972)
- Livet är en fest (1974)
- Kåldolmar och Kalsipper (1976)
- Vi kommer att leva igen (1977 - with Nynningen)
- Barn av vår tid (1978)
- Rockormen (1979)
- Rövarkungens ö (1980)
- Luffarrock - En lurkmusikal (1981)
- Nationalteatern rockorkester LIVE (1991)
- Nationalteatern rockorkester LIVE (2006)

=== Singles ===
- "Livet är en fest"/"Bängen trålar" (1974)
- "Doin' the omoralisk schlagerfestival" (1975)
- "Kamrater, Bodenarbetare!"/"Rädda Varven" (1978)
- "Kolla Kolla"/"Ingelas sång" (1978)

=== Compilations ===
- Nacksving – ett samlat grepp från Götet (1975)
- Alternativ Festival (1975)
- Vi äro tusenden (1977)
- Från Flykt till kamp (1978)
- Nationalteatern En samling 1972-80
- MNW-Klassiker: Nationalteatern (double CD) (2007)

=== DVDs and VHS ===
- Live -91 (1991)
- Tältet - Vem tillhör världen? (2005)
- Nationalteaterns Rockorkester - Live (2006)
