= Nynningen =

Swedish progressive rock group

Nynningen ("The Hum") is a Swedish progressive rock group founded in Gothenburg in 1970. It released five albums in the 1970s before breaking up in 1980, then three more after reuniting in 2016. After the Sverigetopplistan implementation in late 1975, two of these charted: Antlingen en ny dag, which reached #27 in 1976, and Vi kommer att leva igen, which peaked at #24 in 1977.

== Discography ==
- Man mognar med åren (1972)
- För full hals (1973)
- 1974 (1974)
- Äntligen en ny dag! (1975)
- Vi kommer att leva igen (1977) (with Nationalteatern)
- Vi kommer (2019)
- Allting börjar klarna (2020)
- Anakonda och andra låtar (2021)
