= List of bands from Gothenburg =

This is a list of bands, and in some cases musicians, from the city of Gothenburg in Sweden.

- Ace of Base
- AdorableMadness
- Air France
- Ajatus
- Amaranthe
- Anna von Hausswolff
- Antique (duo)
- Apocalypse Orchestra
- Arvingarna
- Attentat
- At the Gates
- Auto-Auto
- Avatar
- Aviana
- Bad Cash Quartet
- Barbados (band)
- Barusta
- Be The Bear
- Biscaya
- Black Ingvars
- Black River Delta
- Blue for Two
- Bombus (band)
- Broder Daniel
- cabal
- Carbon Based Lifeforms
- Cat5
- Cats and Dinosaurs
- Ceremonial Oath
- Cheap Imitation.
- Chuck Norris Experiment
- ColdTears
- Cortex
- Cosmic Overdose
- Crazy Frog
- Cthulhu
- d'Arc Marc and The Dames Delight
- Dark Tranquillity
- Days
- Dead by April
- Deceptic
- Despite
- Detektivbyrån
- Deutsch Nepal
- Dimension Zero
- DistantCity
- Dragonland
- Dream Evil
- El Perro del Mar
- Engel
- Evergrey
- Evil Dead Goofball
- Excellent Accident
- Exempt
- Fibes, Oh Fibes
- Firebreather
- Fontän
- Franke
- Freak Kitchen
- Freddie Wadling
- Gardenian
- Gabo and The Wartels
- Goatdestroyer
- Go Cat Go!
- Grass Shadows
- Gravebomb
- Graveyard
- Jennifer Brown
- Jens Lekman
- José González
- HammerFall
- Hardcore Superstar
- Headplate
- Her Majesty
- Herreys
- Holy Now
- Honey is Cool
- Horses
- Håkan Hellström
- In Flames
- jj
- Laleh
- Lillasyster
- Little Dragon
- LOK
- Lost Horizon
- Love is All
- Lucky People Center
- Luciferion
- Lugnoro
- Maia Hirasawa
- Manganas Garden
- Marionette (band)
- Mattias "IA" Eklundh
- Mental Destruction
- Mikkey Dee
- Mustasch
- My Hat, My Machete
- Mr.Artist
- Mobile Whorehouse
- Monolord
- Morlocks
- Nationalteatern
- Nostradameus
- Nåstrond
- One Without
- One Man Army And The Undead Quartet
- Oscar S.
- OSCAT!
- Passenger
- Pacific!
- Papa Dee
- Perkele
- PHAUSS
- Psychonauts
- Psychotic Youth
- Ruby Empress
- Robert Ritchiesse
- Sacramentum
- Sally and the Monkeys
- Sally Shapiro
- Sambassadeur
- Samuraj Cities
- Sator
- Scumbag Millionaire
- September Malevolence
- Skull Defekts
- Silverbullit
- Strasse
- Stonefunkers
- Studio
- Suis La Lune
- Supergroupies
- Taetre
- Tages
- Tarmvred
- T.E.M.
- The Elliots
- The Embassy
- The Exorcist GBG
- The Halo Effect
- The Haunted
- thehelpmeplease
- The Honeydrips
- The Jackpots
- The Knife
- The Leather Nun
- The Plan
- The Similou
- The Soundtrack of Our Lives
- The Spyders
- The Spotnicks
- The Tough Alliance
- Thermostatic
- Timo Räisänen
- Tross
- Twice A Man
- Union Carbide Productions
- Uran GBG
- West of Eden
- Westkust
- Wintergatan
- X-Gene
- Young Mountain
