= Jane Kitto =

Australian musical artist

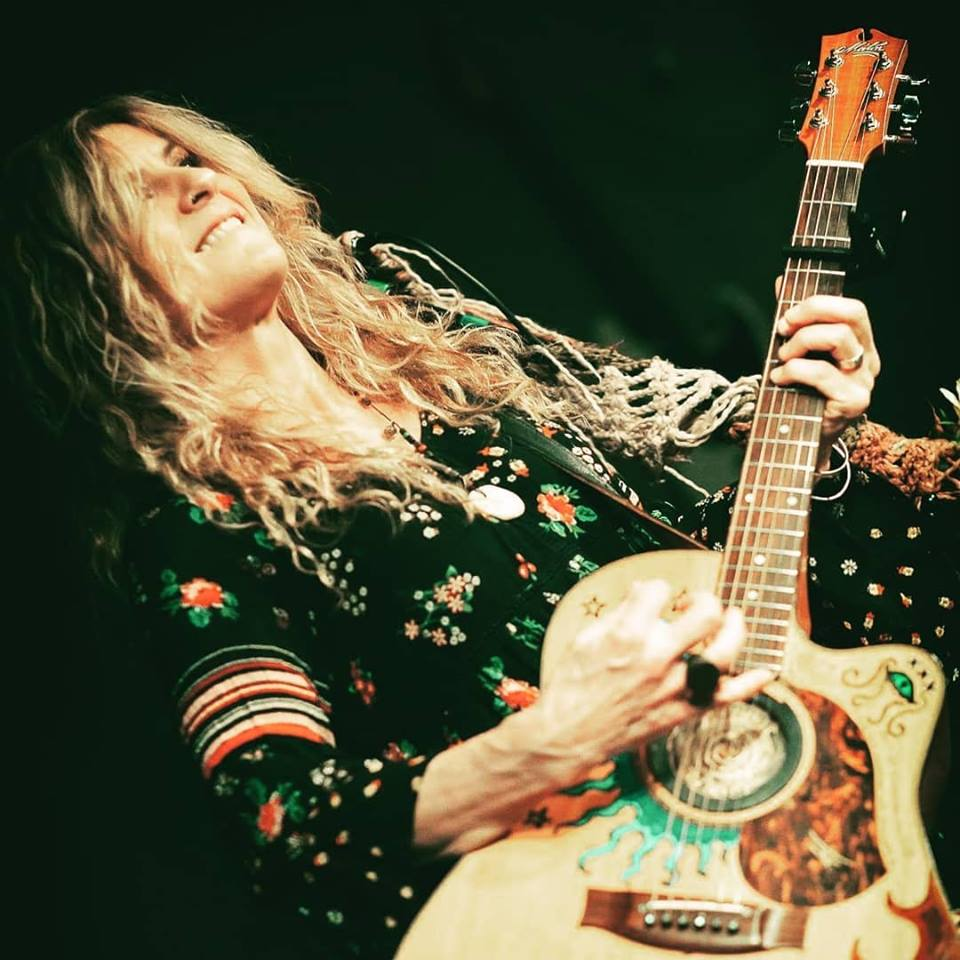
- Kitto, April 14, 2018

Background information
- Also known as: Kitto, Jane Kitto Andersson
- Born: Jane Maree Kitto
- Origin: Yarra Valley, Victoria, Australia
- Genres: Alternative rock, Psychedelic rock, Acoustic Rock
- Occupations: Music Artist, songwriter, vocalist, record producer, vocal trainer
- Instruments: Vocals, Guitar, Bass, Melotron, Percussion
- Years active: 1991 – present
- Labels: Right Recordings UK, Scarecrow Music Group Sweden, Independent owned Whosjack Music, Mushroom Records Australia
- Website: youtube.com/@JaneKittosingersongwriter

Jane Kitto is an Australian songwriter, singer and musician who is professionally known by the artist name Kitto. Her music mainly consists of alternative rock and has recorded 7 albums, 3 EP's and several compilations. She is also co-writer and vocalist together with husband Pna Andersson in their psychedelic classic rock band Perfect Blue Sky. Both reside in Cornwall, United Kingdom. Kitto began her music career when signed to Mushroom Records in 1991 and has since travelled throughout over 35 countries performing at various festivals in Europe alongside remote locations such as Svalbard North Pole, Tahiti, Robben Island and was the first Australian artist to perform live in ex-Soviet country of Belarus. Kitto has appeared on various compilations and singles, as well as live albums and soundtracks and featured in the Australian edition of 'Who's Who of Rock & roll' 1993. Alongside her own work, Kitto has recorded, written and performed with established songwriters such as Vanda & Young, Andrew McMillan and Billy Thorpe and featured as a vocalist with Big Brother and the Holding Company, She tours both as a solo performer and together with Perfect Blue Sky.

== Background and career ==
=== Childhood and early years ===
Jane Maree Kitto was raised in the Melbourne suburb of Burwood. She later grew up in the Yarra Valley region of Wandin North Victoria. Kitto began playing the guitar at the early age of seven, and participated as a contestant in a children's national television variety show Young Talent Time. At the age of 18 she performed her first paid concert for $40 and a cheese platter. In early adulthood, she joined the Royal Australian Navy, and later worked as an auto electrical mechanic. She was writing songs in her spare time and her first national airplay was an advertisement jingle 'Stepping out in Style' for Opal Menswear, which caught the attention of a Melbourne booking agent Terry Blamey.

In the late 1980s Kitto was doing session vocals and studio work for Australian bands, The Gypsies, Cattletruck and Chantoozies. Kitto also toured with Billy Miller's Gypsies Women in the kitchen for more than a year including TV appearances on the popular Australian TV show Hey Hey It's Saturday.

In 1991, she began her career as a solo rock artist when she was signed to Mushroom Records (Australia), along with John Annas, her co-writer and drummer at the time, and together they released a single, Blind Lead the Blind. She appeared in the Australian edition of Who's Who of Rock & roll (Moonlight Publishing, 1993) and her songs featured in the TV series 'Home and Away'. However, as Kitto wanted to avoid the female rock cliché and pursue her career as a freelance songwriter, it eventually led to a parting of the ways between her and Mushroom Records.

She continued her career as an independent artist with The Harbour Agency, performing at various clubs in Sydney, and also opening up for artists such as Billy Thorpe, Diesel, Ian Moss, Richard Clapton, Jon Stevens, Mark Seymour and Nathan Cavaleri.

Kitto also encountered a surprise meeting with Metallica's tour manager Tony Smith from Q-Prime Mgmt and shook hands with James Hetfield himself who had scouted two of her shows and surprised her with tickets to Metallica's Sydney concert in the summer of 1994. They both gave her a Q-Prime business card to pursue contact which she lost somewhere in her travels and had never forgotten since.

Jeff 'Skunk' Baxter (Steely Dan, Doobie Brothers) spotted her in a solo show in Sydney one evening and invited her to join him in the US to play and co-write songs. She moved to Los Angeles in 1994, and performed in various music clubs, including Whisky a Go Go and The Roxy Theatre, but when her visa expired she returned to Australia.

=== 1995–2004 ===
1995 Kitto recorded her first independent EP 20 Jacksonia. She was then invited to travel to Europe which included an appearance on a Swedish TV show, 'Good Morning Sweden' TV4 performing Jason, a song about a street musician whom she developed a friendship jamming alongside him on the streets of Sydney after her shows had finished bringing alongside her audience entourage.

Kitto began spending more time around Scandinavia under the guidance of booking agent and later manager Jörgen Wiking who had her performing at various Nordic festivals e.g. Västervik Visfestivalen, Peace and Love, Midtfyn Festival in Denmark, Puistoblues in Finland and The Scandinavian Guitar Festival. She also joined the bill with numerous touring acts such as Joey Tempest(Europe) and Wilson Pickett and also made a guest appearance on Sweden's Triple & Touch TV show. She recorded an EP titled Jane Kitto, of which her single Mary and Vimmi K received national exposure on SR Swedish radio and television.

1997–99 Kitto toured with her live shows mainly in Germany and France with her new band Baby Porcelain along with US co-writer Tim Tate and French drummer Frank Bessard. They performed at Festival De Guitar De Montauroux, Bremen Festival, Sinkkasten Frankfurt, Théâtre de Verdure Nice 10th birthday gala for Guitar Maniac, Festival Haut De Cagnes, Brianconnet Rock, Lé Reservoir Paris, La Haut Festival, Beausoleil Théâtre, Dans l'Festival, M Daner Bonson Festival, Le Mas Puget sur argens as support to Sinclair and RTL2 Radio. Baby Porcelain released the CD Umbilically Yours in 1999.

Kitto's first solo album Princess of Tragedy was launched 2002. The title single Busdriver reached number one on the Sweden's Spray Charts and gained high rotation with Australia's ABC Triple J networks and various other radio stations. 'Busdriver' was co-written and performed with saxophonist Kellie Santin.

In 2002 Kitto participated in a Swedish TV gala ABBA the Tribute (Svt), performing alongside Micke Rickfors and Mats Ronander as well as Dionne Warwick. On the show, she sang two Abba's classic songs, On and on and On and Summer Night City. Afterwards she appeared at Nice Jazz Festival supporting Jacque Higgins followed by a series of shows at Longyearbyen, a town based at the North Pole, with Swedish drummer Mårten Ronsten and Weine Johansson (Baltimoore) on bass. Kitto made a journey to Robben Island just off coast South Africa in 2004, the home of former political prisoner Nelson Mandela and performed a song titled 'Toward the sun' which she and co writer Robert Gale had written based on Mandela's book 'Long walk to freedom'. Kitto also performed the song live on Bush Radio in Cape Town.

=== 2005–2013 ===
The second album Precious Junk, was released in 2005. The single track Catalina Dreaming was collaborated alongside Andrew McMillan, the author of the book Catalina Dreaming. 'Precious Junk' featured airplay by Triple J and various radio stations throughout Australia. Later that year she was approached by John Lomax III, who invited her to perform in Nashville US, Tennessee's Australian Festival. She also held a show in New York at CBGB's then flew across to Los Angeles and performed at Cat Club in Hollywood together with Teddy 'Zigzag' Andreadis (Alice Cooper (band), Guns N' Roses).

Kitto recorded another album titled Over Sensitive in Los Angeles with producer Michael Vail Blum alongside session musicians, bassist Johnny Griparic (Slash's Snakepit), guitarist Dean Pleasants (Suicidal Tendencies) and drummer Simon Runge. Several songs were written by Kitto and long time friend South African songwriter colleague Andrew McDonald, who later went on to become her manager. The album was mixed and mastered later that year back in Sweden by a young producer, composer and guitarist for the black metal band Netherbird, Pontus (Pna) Andersson in Sweden. Entrepreneur Asher Hayley from a UK label Green Pepper Junction working together with London-based label Right Recordings signed Over Sensitive to a license deal and it was released in 2007.

The meeting with Andersson proved long lasting consequences. After Over Sensitive was completed, the two had developed such a strong working relationship so Kitto asked him to accompany her as her guitarist at Maryport Blues Festival in the UK when she was billed alongside headliner Tony Joe White. In the same year, Kitto composed a soundtrack along with author Lauren St John for a film based on St John's book The White Giraffe, called Last Place You Look, and the song was recorded under the guidance of Andersson at his studios. Andersson continued performing with Kitto and her then band as her guitarist, and ten years later in 2015 were eventually married.

2006 Kitto toured in Sweden and the UK as front vocalist for Janis Joplin's original band Big Brother and the Holding Company. She flew to San Francisco to make the audition and was greeted at the lobby of the Triton Hotel by Big Brother's guitarist Sam Andrew who came swinging Janis Joplin's own signature guitar 1964 Gibson Bluebird which Kitto used to perform the audition. Jerry Donahue Hellecasters, (Fairport Convention, Fotheringay) was also on the tour as guest guitarist. This also impacted the later collaboration with her band to come, Perfect Blue Sky.

Meantime Kitto continued on touring as a solo artist back and forth, performing on Swedish national TV and also making appearances in her homeland Australia.

Kitto recorded EP Unlearn Your Generation in 2008, featuring the singles 'Jack the Ripper' and 'Maryrose' which were produced by Chips Kiesbye, guitarist from the Swedish punk rock band Sator. Andersson featured on guitar along with bassist Anders Molin and Robban Bäck (Sabaton, Mustasch) on drums. The tracks were co-written with Kitto by both Andrew McDonald and Andrew McMillan.

Kitto headlined in 2009 Le Pacific Rock Festival in Papetee, French Polynesia, Tahiti's first rock festival event along with US guitarist Jeffrey Kollman (Chad Smith's Bombastic Meatbats), NZ bassist Billy Lang and drummer Joel Taylor. She later that year performed at the Dundee Blues Bonanza festival in Scotland, this time as a drum and guitar duo called The Blue Stripes together with Bill Bryant. Bryant's company Power FX recorded Kitto's vocals on a sample CD Extreme Rock Funk Rage, and in the promotional video Kitto duelled with Sweet Ann, the virtual vocalist. Some of the samples appear in Garageband software by Apple computers.

During the following years Kitto toured and performed across Europe at various music festivals, such as Sweden Rock, Helge Å Festival Sweden, Reiu Rock Estonia, Edinburgh Festival Scotland UK and Les Enfants Du Rock in France as well as her home country Australia. In July 2010 Les Enfants Du Rock in France 2010 both Kitto and Andersson were support to Pete Doherty who consequently made a 'no show' and the duo were shifted up to the main headline on the festival.

Kitto's fifth rock Album Crash 2011, was recorded with Kitto's then current band, Pna Andersson on guitar, Jan Johansson on drums and Anders Molin on bass. It was released, engineered and produced under Andersson's personal record label Scarecrow Recordings and rock metal distributors Sound Pollution SE.

=== 2014–2019 ===
In 2014 Kitto and Pna Andersson formed a multinational psychedelic rock band called Perfect Blue Sky. Both Kitto and Andersson are the founding members of the band and invited well-known musicians as guests to feature on both their two albums and live shows. Perfect Blue Sky's first album Emerald was released 2014. Their premier line up consisted of Dave Getz and Peter Albin (Big Brother and the Holding Company) and Danny Oakhill (Turksize) from Australia. The premier concert was in Stockholm at Stampen, followed by other shows including Puistoblues and Pieksämäki Beach Blues festivals in Finland. She also continued to tour as a solo artist, mainly throughout Scandinavia.

2015 Perfect Blue Sky performed at Darwin's Sea Breeze Festival in Australia, with guest Allen Murphy former drummer for The Village People and Australian Aboriginal band Yothu Yindi and Danny Oakhill on keyboards. This was followed later by another series of shows in Scandinavia, with Weine Johansson on bass and Bil Bryant on drums.

The second album The Eye of Tilos was released in 2017, featuring once again Dave Getz, Jerry Donahue, Frank Bessard and Danny Oakhill. Perfect Blue Sky completed BBC UK live radio tours in 2017-2018 including BBC Essex BBC Oxford, BBC Lancashire, BBC Cornwall, Metro Radio, Total Rock Radio and Phoenix FM in May 2017.

=== 2020–Present ===
In early 2021, Kitto published Atlantic Cover Sessions as an online release only. During the Covid era, both Kitto and Andersson chose to reside in Newquay, Cornwall UK and continued to write and record songs for Perfect Blue Sky with a bi-monthly slew of singles and filming music videos on their Cornish apartment block staircase. Their first Double A-side single & video Oh Pretty One and hand-sketched anime The Silver Ark was released in June 2020 and distributed via Record Union in Sweden to Spotify and Apple iTunes. More followed throughout the year with Stymie, Honest Man, Know My Enemy Well and One Starry Night, all mastered by British record producer and sound engineer John Cornfield (Muse, Oasis). Other singles that year includes Plush (Stone Temple Pilots cover) and Beat of that drum.

Later the duo emerged as one of the fortunate bands selected for The Great Estate’s ‘Gardens Gathering’ alongside Newton Faulkner in 2020 onto the Cornish festival scene under their various compilation of bands i.e. Little Orchard Festival, Leopallooza, The GreatEstate, Rattler Festival and down in Australia’s Northern Territory Nightcliff Seabreeze Festival 2024. Between 2022-2025 Kitto performed together with Andersson under the guise of all three of their bands Perfect Blue Sky, Kitto and more recent folk trio Delilah Daisies and Indie-Rock Dolores Marvelous.

In late 2024, Kitto featured two songs Last Place You Look and Pretty Pink Baby Blue in a British movie produced by Queen Bee Films led by writer and producer Deborah Hadfield The Chocolate Club.

In September 2025, Kitto made her ‘bucket list’ theatre debut together with her trio Lewis Parsons (viola) and Kalle Rantala (drums) at her idol and renowned Finnish Movie Producer Aki Kaurismäki’s studio at Kino Laika in Karkkila Finland.

To date, Kitto currently performs solo or with her trio on various tours particularly twice yearly in Finland via her agent-manager Jari Hämäläinen at Gogo Rodeo Agency based in Finland where she holds a loyal fan-base as well as Sweden, Australia and the South West of England in Cornwall where both she and Pna Andersson are domicile.

== Players ==
- Pontus ‘Pna’ Andersson – Guitar / Vocals / Producer / Co-Writer
- Anders ‘Molle’ Molin – Bass
- Daniel Robinson aka ‘Danny Krash’ – Drums
- Kalle Rantala – Drums
- Doug Corby – Drums / Vocals
- Lewis Parsons – Viola / Bass
- Gem Caley – Percussion / Vocals

=== Past and session players ===
- John Annas – Drums /Vocals / Co-Writer
- Frank Bessard – Drums / Vocals
- Bil Bryant – Drums / Producer
- Allen Murphy - Drums
- Tim Tate – Bass
- Roger McLachlan - Bass
- Kim May - Bass

== Discography ==
Albums, EP's & Singles

- Kitto – Atlantic Cover Sessions (Online Album 2021)
- Perfect Blue Sky – The Eye of Tilos (CD 2017)
- Perfect Blue Sky – Emerald (CD 2015)
- Flower Punch – Flower Punch (CD 2012)
- Kitto – Crash (CD 2011)
- Kitto – Unlearn Your Generation (EP 2009)
- Kitto – Chiltern Sessions Unreleased (CD 2007)
- Kitto – Over Sensitive (CD 2007)
- Kitto – Precious Junk (CD 2005)
- Kitto – Catalina Dreaming (Single 2004)
- Kitto – I Wonder Why (Single 2003)
- Kitto – Glorious (Single 2002)
- Kitto – Princess of Tragedy (CD 2002)
- Kitto – Umbilically Yours (CD 2000)
- Kitto – Baby Porcelain (CD 1998)
- Kitto – Jane Kitto Unreleased (EP 1996)
- Kitto – 20 Jacksonia (EP 1995)
- Kitto – Blind Lead The Blind (Single 1991)

Compilations

- Little Miss Rock N Roll Featuring The Fintones Finnish All Music & Media FAMCD-108 Finland (CD 2011)
- Power FX sample CD 'Extreme Rock Funk Rage' features Kitto vocal samples (CD 2007)
- Rock 'N Fuck CD Feat Kitto 'A Short Story'. Produced by Jerkhouse Connection – France (CD 2006)
- Essential Chillhouse Vol 4 Presents Cool Sound Music COOL07314 Spain (2007)
- Everybody's Story – Brian Kramer (2002)
- W.A.A.M Ben Antell BOX AMERICANA Riverside Records rrcd009 (2000)
- Jukka Tolonen 'Big Time' Feat Kitto on 'Hard Work Jam' and 'You sure know how to fool me' VDFCD-8004 Gazell Records AB Sweden (1997)
- Mushroom Autumn Sampler – PRD91/11 Mushroom Australia (1991)
- Cattle truck ready to believe CD 38720 Mushroom Australia (1987)
- Chantoosies 'He's gonna step on you again' Mushroom Australia (1987)
