= Perfect Blue Sky =

Musical collaboration between Pontus 'Pna' Andersson and Jane Kitto (2014–present)

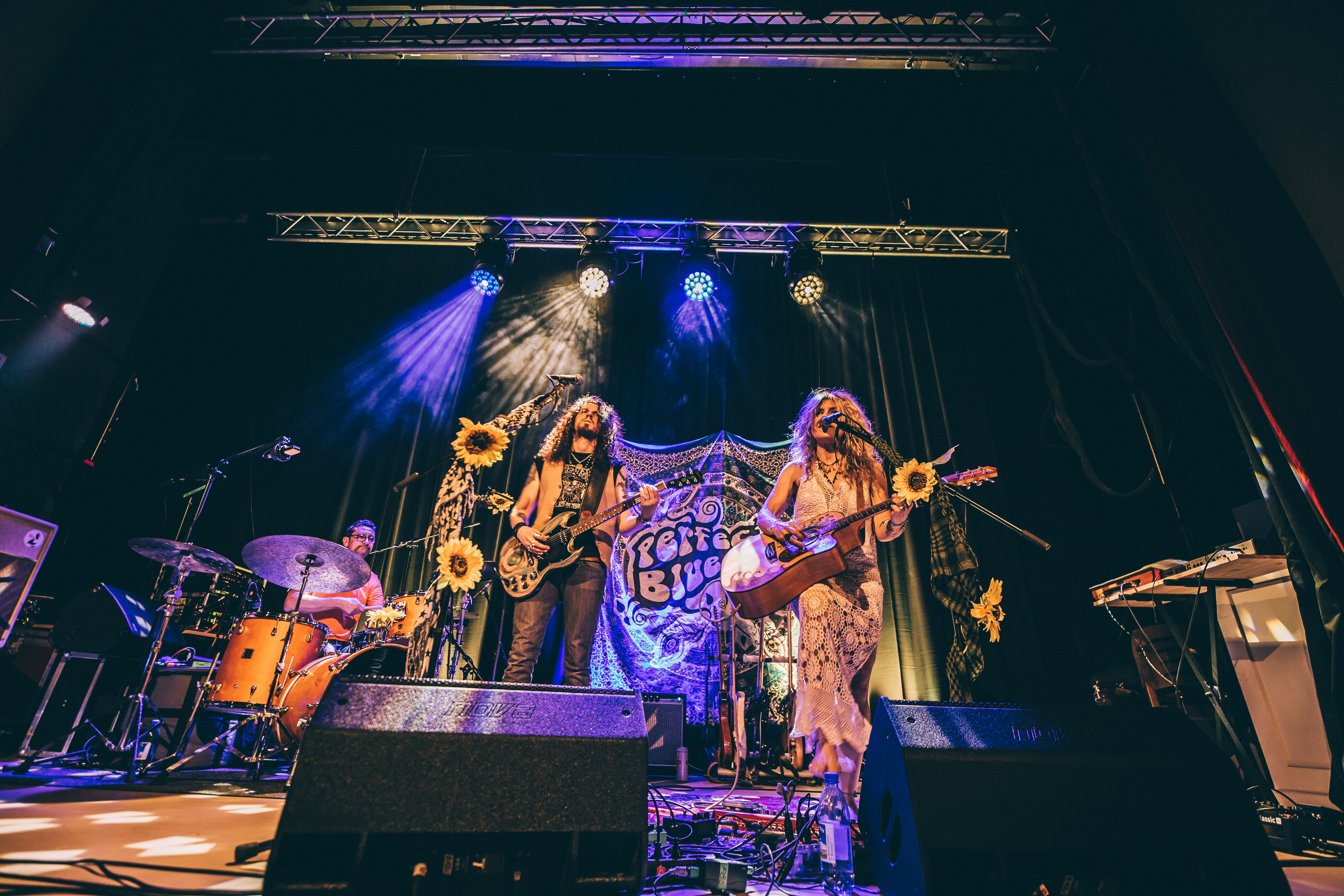
- Perfect Blue Sky in 2018

Background information
- Origin: Stockholm, Sweden; Current location Newquay, England
- Genres: Alternative, psychedelic, classic rock
- Years active: 2014–present
- Labels: Right Recordings,/Nova Universal, Scarecrow
- Members: Jane Kitto; Pontus Andersson ('Pna'); Frank Bessard; Danny Oakhill
- Website: www.youtube.com/PerfectBlueSkyRock

Perfect Blue Sky is the collaboration between Swedish black metal guitarist Pontus 'Pna' Andersson (Netherbird) and Australian alternative rock vocalist Jane Kitto. Combining their influences as songwriters, their sound is a hybrid between the 1970s psychedelic classic rock and 1990s grunge eras.

== History (2014–present) ==
Andersson and Kitto formed Perfect Blue Sky in 2014 with a premier performance at Finland's Puistoblues festival and a live performance on Radio Rock, as well as other shows in Sweden. They featured well known US musicians Dave Getz (drums) and Peter Albin (bass) of Big Brother and the Holding Company and Danny Oakhill (keyboards) from Australia to launch the band on both their live shows and the studio recordings.

In April 2015, they went on a second tour in the outback of Australia's Northern Territory with Oakhill and newcomer Allen Murphy (Yothu Yindi, Village People) on drums, and performed at the Nightcliff Sea Breeze Festival and the Humpty Doo Hotel, as well as made a live appearance on Darwin's ABC radio.

They have since performed in alternative line-ups throughout Scandinavia, France and the UK together with French drummer Frank Bessard, US drummer Bil Bryant (Machine Gun), Swedish bassist Weine Johansson, French percussionist Stephane Bébert and drummer Frank Bessard as well as a duo.

Their first single Give You My Love was released on 12 May 2017 by UK label Right Recordings/Nova Universal. The single is taken from the album The Eye of Tilos, released on 19 May 2017. The album features Jerry Donahue (guitarist for Fotheringay and Fairport Convention) and drummer Dave Getz (Big Brother and the Holding Company). Also in the line-up is Frenchman Frank Bessard (Mr. lab!, Joe Satriani, Stanley Clarke) on drums, Australian keyboardist Danny Oakhill, and British viola player Lewis Parsons.

Perfect Blue Sky completed their first UK live radio tour including BBC Essex, BBC Oxford, BBC Lancashire, Metro Radio, Total Rock Radio and Phoenix FM in May 2017.

Astronaut, the band's follow-up single for 2017, was released on 20 October and well-received onto various UK radio playlists, and supported by acoustic duo's mini-tour in November. Perfect Blue Sky appeared once again live on various radio programmes; BBC Bristol, BBC Cumbria, BBC Merseyside, BBC Humberside and BBC Lancashire, and made an interview and performance for the Children in Need 2017 campaign with BBC Lancashire presenter John Gillmore. Perfect Blue Sky also made live appearances with Alan Robson on his 'NightOwls' programme at Metro Radio in Newcastle as well as 103 The Eye and Phoenix FM. Whilst on tour, they supported John O'Leary (Savoy Brown) and SugarKane, among others. Whilst on tour in November 2017, Andersson and Kitto also joined alongside UK representative Darren Weale of Pro Music Agency and consequently moved their base to the UK.

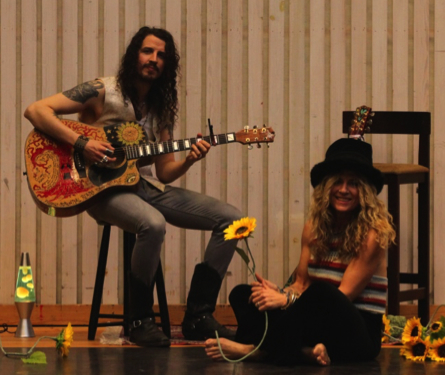
Perfect Blue Sky in 2017

In December 2017, Perfect Blue Sky supported Swedish rock band Sator at Söder Teatern in Stockholm, and in March 2018, they toured throughout Finland with yet another constellation of the band's line-up; this time with Marko Ahonen on drums and Salomon Kosunen on keyboards via Finnish booking agency Gogo Rodeo. In May, Perfect Blue Sky performed with the band's main drummer Frank Bessard at the Mailaul Festival Tartu, Estonia. During the festival they also hosted a series of workshops at Heino Eller Tartu Music College. Perfect Blue Sky released three singles consecutively 2018, Fiction Man, Wasteland and Winds Ransom, from their album The Eye of Tilos.

Andersson and Kitto relocated to the south west of England in Newquay, Cornwall during 2019 after having felt inspired by the Atlantic coast and its vibrant music culture. Perfect Blue Sky's first British line-up featured James Frost on drums and bassist Jon Middleton. However, during early 2020 with the onset of COVID-19, most of the band's performances had been cancelled until 2021. In the meantime, the duo have kept up their music presence making occasional on-line acoustic appearances, song projects, recording, and creating music videos in the staircase of their apartment block. As a result, Perfect Blue Sky's first single/video Oh Pretty Oneand The Silver Ark were released in June, 2020 and distributed to Spotify and Apple iTunes via Record Union based in Sweden. A subsequent series of singles and videos followed on throughout the year including Plush, One Starry Night, Stymie, Honest Man. Their most recent single releases in 2021 are Howl to the moon (12 March) and Double A sides Beat of That Drum, Apple Gaze (12 February), mastered by British record producer and sound engineer John Cornfield (Muse, Oasis).

During 2021 Perfect Blue Sky emerged as one of the fortunate bands selected for The Great Estate’s ‘Gardens Gathering’ alongside Newton Faulkner and made several appearances in their home county of Cornwall including The Acorn Theatre Penzance, The Great Estate Festival Scorrier House, Newquay Beer Festival, Dead Famous and Whiskers in Newquay and down in Australia’s Northern Territory Nightcliff Seabreeze Festival 2024.

Perfect Blue Sky feature their soundtrack Howl To The Moon in a 2025 release of Chinese Whispers.

== Band members ==
- Jane Kitto – guitar, vocals (2014–present)
- Pontus 'Pna' Andersson – guitar, vocals, bass (2014–present)
- Frank Bessard – drums (2016–present)
- Danny Oakhill – keyboards (2014–present)
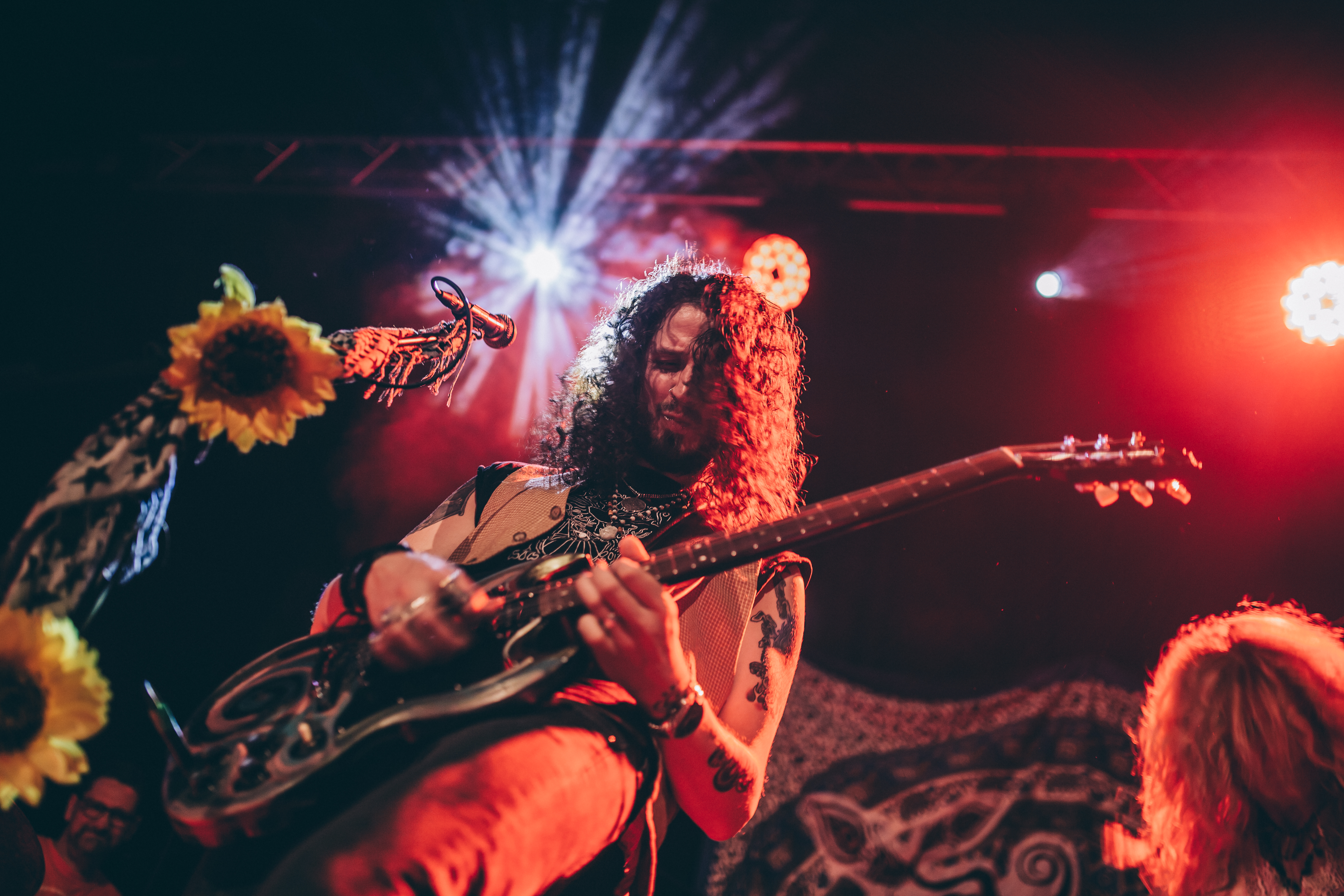
'Pna' Andersson

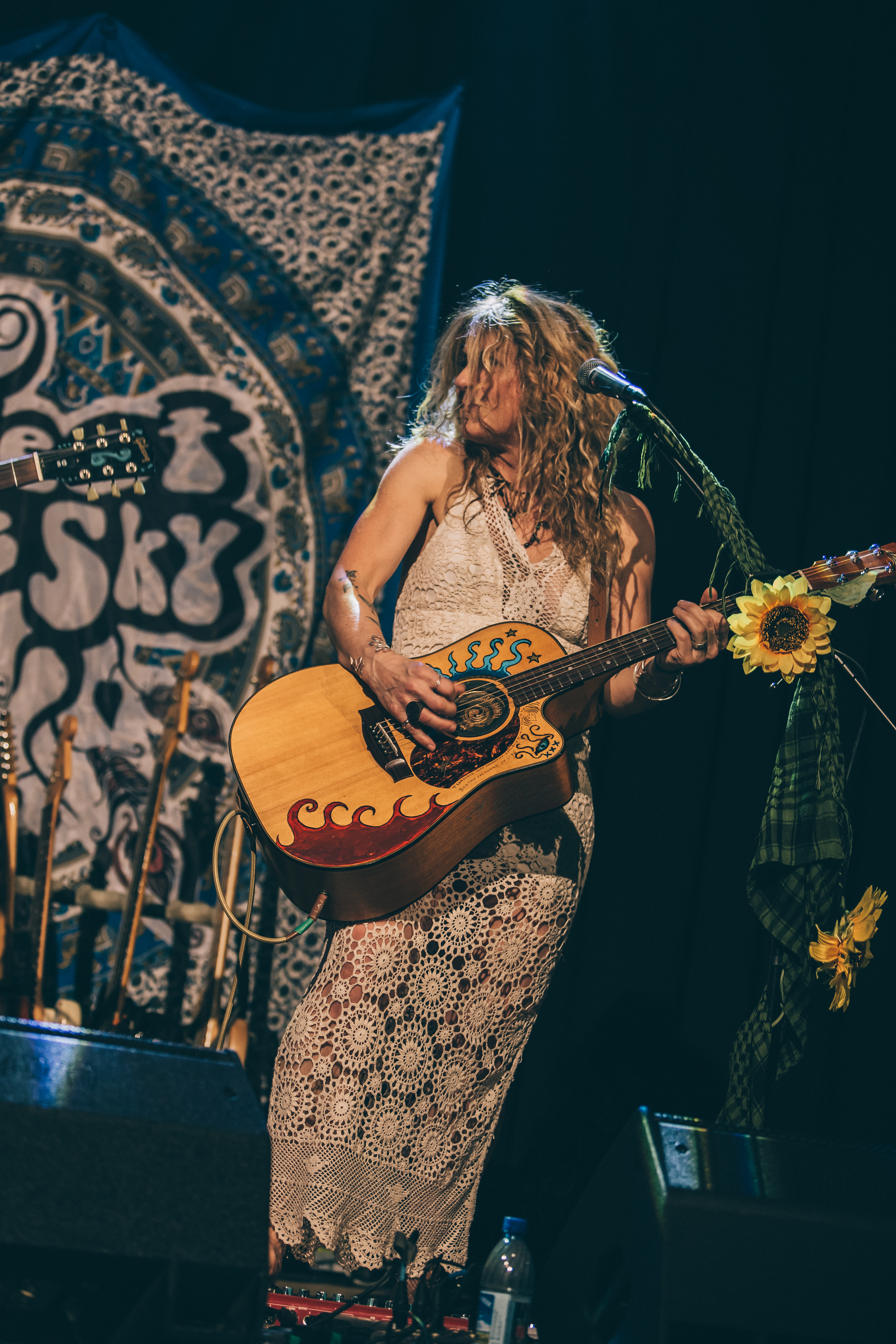
Jane Kitto

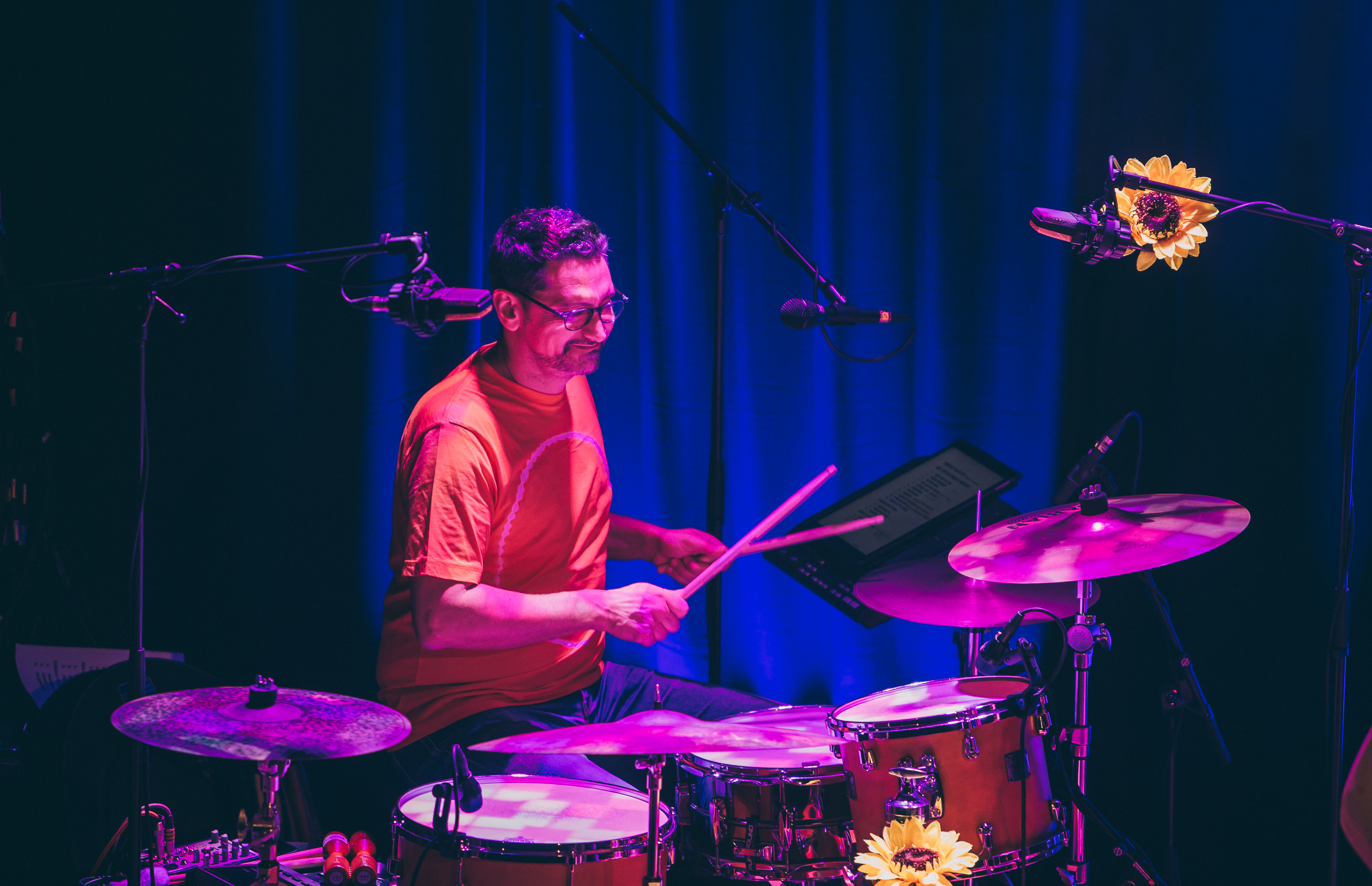
Frank Bessard

=== Past and session members ===
- Doug Corby - drums (2024–present)
- Lewis Parsons – violin (2016–present)
- Salomon Kosunen – keyboards (2018–present)
- Dave Getz – drums (2014–present)
- Allen Murphy – drums (2015–present)
- Marko Ahonen – drums (2018–present)
- Bil Bryant – drums (2015–present)
- Weine Johansson – bass (2015–present)
- Stephane Bébert – percussion (2016–present)
- Jerry Donahue – guitar (2015-2017)
- Peter Albin – bass (2014-2015)
- James Frost – drums (2020)
- Jon Middleton – bass (2020)

== Discography ==
- 2015 – Emerald (CD/LP)
- 2017 – Give You My Love (digital single)
- 2017 – The Eye of Tilos (CD/LP)
- 2017 – Astronaut (digital single)
- 2018 – Fiction Man (digital single)
- 2018 – Wasteland (digital single)
- 2018 – Winds Ransom (digital single)
- 2020 – Silver Ark (digital single)
- 2020 – Oh Pretty One (digital single)
- 2020 - Know my enemy well (digital single)
- 2020 - Mevis and the raven (digital single)
- 2020 - Plush (digital single)
- 2020 - One Starry Night (digital single)
- 2020 - Stymie (digital single)
- 2020 - Honest Man (digital single)
- 2021 - Beat of That Drum (digital single)
- 2021 - Apple Gaze (digital single)
- 2021 - Howl to the moon (digital single)
