= Rodney & the Tube Tops =

- The band, as seen on the cover of "I Hate the 90's"

Background information
- Origin: Seattle, Washington, United States
- Genres: Alternative rock
- Years active: 1996–1997
- Label: Sympathy for the Record Industry
- Members: Rodney Bingenheimer; Eric Erlandson; Thurston Moore; Pat Fear; Dave Markey

Rodney & the Tube Tops was an American alternative rock supergroup from Seattle, Washington. The band included members of Hole, Sonic Youth and White Flag and was named after frontman, DJ Rodney Bingenheimer.

== Origins and career ==
The band formed in 1996, while Eric Erlandson's band Hole were on a reported hiatus, and recorded their only single, "I Hate the 90's" at a Seattle-based recording studio in 1996. A minute-long collection of clips from the session was released by drummer Dave Markey in 2008. The single was released a year later on the indie label Sympathy for the Record Industry. The band disbanded soon afterwards.

In 2004, "I Hate The 90's" was featured as part of the soundtrack to the Rodney Bingenheimer documentary, Mayor of the Sunset Strip.

== Members ==
- Rodney Bingenheimer - vocals
- Eric Erlandson - lead guitar
- Thurston Moore - rhythm guitar
- Pat Fear - bass
- Dave Markey - drums, percussion

== Discography ==
- "I Hate the 90's" - released in 1997, b/w "Tube Tops Forever"/"Cellphone Madness"
- Mayor of the Sunset Strip OST - released in 2004
