= I Hate the 90's =

Single by Rodney & the Tube Tops
- B-side: "Tube Tops Forever"/"Cellphone Madness"
- Released: 1997
- Recorded: 1996 Tarantula Ranch Hollywood, California, United States
- Genre: Alternative rock
- Length: 3:42
- Label: Sympathy for the Record Industry
- Songwriters: Eric Erlandson, Thurston Moore, Pat Fear Dave Markey, Rodney Bingenheimer, Cameron Jamie
- Producer: Cameron Jamie

"I Hate the 90's" is a song by short-lived American alternative rock band, Rodney & the Tube Tops. The song was released as the band's debut single in 1997 on the indie label Sympathy for the Record Industry. As the band was more of a side project for members of Hole, Sonic Youth and White Flag, "I Hate the 90's" was the only release by the band.

== Recording ==
The song was recorded at Tarantula Ranch Hollywood, California at some point in 1996 along with the songs "Tube Tops Forever" and "Cellphone Madness," which were later featured as the single's b-sides. Visual artist and filmmaker Cameron Jamie, who co-wrote the song's lyrics with frontman Rodney Bingenheimer, produced, and Dave Travis engineered the recording session. A minute-long collection of clips from the recording session was released by drummer Dave Markey in 2008.

== Composition ==
"I Hate the 90's"
The lyrics of "I Hate the 90's" satirize aspects of 1990's alternative culture.

The song's lyrics, written by Bingenheimer and Jamie, primarily satirize aspects of alternative culture in the early 1990s and relates them to the former culture of punk rock. IGN Music stated that "I Hate the 90's" was a song "in which Bingenheimer extols his love of every thing before the '90s and judiciously uses his catch phrase 'Godhead.'" The lyrics make a number of references to several celebrities including Marcia Brady from The Brady Bunch, Brian Wilson, Janis Joplin and Kate Moss, trends such as fashion, body piercings, tattoos, the Internet, recreational drug use and contemporary topics and events such as the fall of the Berlin Wall, last-call return and the rise of BDSM. The final lyrics feature Bingenheimer shouting "get me to the year 2000 at once!"

Musically, "I Hate the 90's" follows a standard punk rock form. The intro consists of a rising drum beat, accompanied by bass, and FX'd guitar riffs and transcends in to a repeatative riff used throughout the verses of the song. The chorus uses barre chords and heavy use of cymbals and immediately climaxes and stops before the song's refrain "I hate the 90's!" The bridge is composed of alternative guitar tunings played in an experimental style, possibly written by Thurston Moore, as Sonic Youth are known for their use of alternate tunings.

== Release ==
The single was released the following year on Sympathy for the Record Industry. The song was featured on Beloved Records compilation album, It's a Goof, released on August 18, 1998 and was also featured in the soundtrack to Rodney Bingenheimer's 2004 documentary, Mayor of the Sunset Strip. Due to both the band and record label's underground status, the single failed to receive much attention.

== Track listing ==
All lyrics by Rodney Bingenheimer and Cameron Jamie, all music by Eric Erlandson, Thurston Moore, Pat Fear and Dave Markey.

No.	Title	Length
1.	"I Hate the 90's"	03:41
2.	"Tube Tops Forever"	03:30
3.	"Cellphone Madness"	02:49
Total length:		10:00

== Release history ==
Region	Date	Format	Featured on
United States	February 1997	7" vinyl	"I Hate the 90's"
United States	August 18, 1998	Compact disc	It's a Goof
United States	March 16, 2004	Compact disc	Mayor of the Sunset Strip

== Personnel ==
Musicians

- Rodney Bingenheimer - vocals
- Eric Erlandson - lead guitar
- Thurston Moore - rhythm guitar
- Pat Fear - bass
- Dave Markey - drums, percussion

Technical personnel

- Cameron Jamie - producer, engineer
- Dave Travis - engineer, mixing (on "Tube Tops Forever")
- Chris Carter - mixing (on "I Hate the 90's")
- Dave Markey - mixing (on "Tube Tops Forever")
- Richard Bosworth - mixing (on "I Hate the 90's")

Art personnel

- Tom Jamison - photography
