= Chips Kiesbye =

Swedish guitarist and vocalist

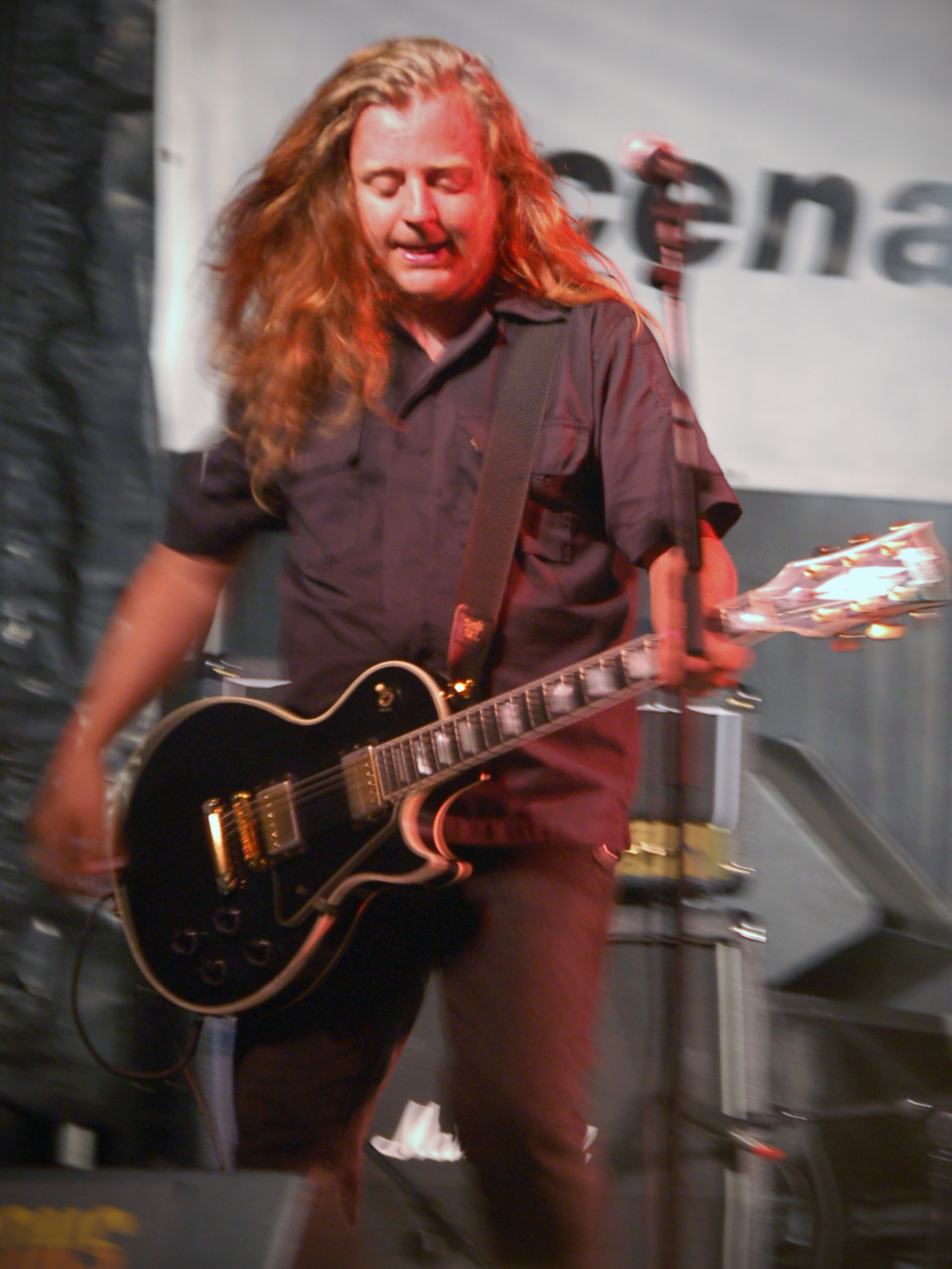
- Kiesbye performing with Sator in 2008

Background information
- Born: Mats Gerhard Tomas Kiesbye
- Genres: Garage rock, rock, garage punk, punk rock, garage rock revival, power pop, psychedelic rock, pop, skate punk
- Occupations: Musician, songwriter, record producer, recording engineer
- Instruments: Vocals, guitar
- Years active: 1981–present
- Label: Planet of Noise Records
- Member of: Sator

Chips Kiesbye is a Swedish musician and record producer. He is a guitarist and vocalist for the rock band Sator, formed in the 1980s in Borlänge. He has also worked to produce material with several of Sweden's most successful rock bands and artists such as The Hellacopters, The Nomads, Millencolin, Thåström, Sahara Hotnights, Wilmer X and many others.

== Selected discography ==
With Sator

- Wanna Start a Fire? (1986) (as Sator Codex)
- Slammer! (1988)
- Stock Rocker Nuts! (1990)
- Headquake (1992)
- Barbie-Q-Killers Vol. 1 (1994)
- Stereo (1995)
- Musical Differences (1998)
- Basement Noise (2006)
- Under the Radar (2011)

Production

- Badmouth – Heavy Metal Parking Lot (2009)
- Badmouth – Blue Ribbon Days EP (2011)
- Badmouth – To Watch the Bridges Burn ”Part three of H.A.T.E" EP (2011)
- Backyard Babies - Sliver & Gold (2019)
- Bazooka! – First Floor Second Skin (1996)
- The Billy Pilgrims – Where's the Goddamn Revolution (2009)
- The Billy Pilgrims – Stiff White Gospel (2014)
- Bo-Dogs - Bad bad dog! (2014)
- Bohemian Lifestyle - Madame Libertanah (2015)
- Bonafide- Something's Dripping (2009)
- Brain Police - Beyond the Wasteland (2006)
- Captain Murphy - Captain Murphy (2004)
- Captain Murphy - Human Cannonball (2007)
- Captain Black Beard - It's a Mouthful (2016)
- Centerfolds - Stuck in the Past (2012)
- Crucified Barbara - The Midnight Chase (2012)
- Crucified Barbara - In the Red (2014)
- The Dahlmanns - American Heartbeat (2018)
- Dozer – Call It Conspiracy (2003)
- Feast Of Fools - EP (2016)
- Graveyard - Peace (2018)
- Greybeards - For the Wilder Minds (2018)
- Hard Luck Street - Darker Days (2020)
- Hard Luck Street - Agents (2026)
- Helikoptern - One More Before We Go (2018)
- The Hellacopters – High Visibility (2000)
- The Hellacopters – By the Grace of God (2002)
- The Hellacopters – Strike Like Lightning (2004)
- The Hellacopters – Rock & Roll Is Dead (2005)
- The Hellacopters – Head Off (2008)
- The Hellacopters - Numerous singles and compilation tracks
- Nisse Hellberg - Snackbar Blues (2006)
- Nisse Hellberg - En tiger i tanken (2007)
- Nisse Hellberg - En modern man (2009)
- Nisse Hellberg - Flod av eld (2011)
- Nisse Hellberg - Vad har han i huvudet (2014)
- Nisse Hellberg - Outgivna Bitar 2000 - 2016 (2017)
- Nisse Hellberg - Numerous singles and compilation tracks
- Jönzzonligan - Rösta på idioter (2019)
- Kitto – Unlearn Your Generation (2009)
- Kung Social - EP (2003)
- La Secta - It's Gonna Be a Wild Weekend (2003)
- La Secta - Several singles
- Mascot Parade - Cause & Effect (2011)
- Michael Monroe - Blackout States (2015)
- Millencolin – Kingwood (2005)
- Millencolin – Several singles
- Mimikry - Alderland (2008)
- Misdemeanor – You're Nothing (And You Know It) (1998)
- Mutts – Mutts (1996)
- Mutts – I Need Needles EP (1996)
- Mutts – I Need You EP (1996)
- Mutts – Southpark Avenue 4 AM Single (1997)
- Naked Presidents - Naked Presidents (2017)
- The Nomads – Sonically Speaking (1991)
- The Nomads – The Cold Hard Facts of Life (1996)
- The Nomads – Big Sound 2000 (1999)
- The Nomads – Up-Tight (2001)
- The Nomads – Solna (2012)
- The Nomads – Loaded Deluxe EP (2013)
- The Nomads – Numerous singles and compilation tracks
- Oak Brigade - Creators of the World (2018)
- Paul Collins Beat - Ribbon of Gold (2008)
- Plan Nine - Generation Action (2000)
- Psychotic Youth – Some Fun (1989)
- Psychotic Youth – Juice (1993)
- Psychotic Youth – Several singles
- Republikans - Republikans (2015)
- The Ring The River - Alone at the Theatre (2017)
- Sahara Hotnights – Jennie Bomb (2001)
- Sahara Hotnights – Several singles
- Sator - Several albums and singles as producer and co-producer
- Skallbank - Grav efter grav EP (2017)
- Small Jackets - Cheap Tequila (2009)
- Sons of Cyrus - Rock & Rollercoaster (2004)
- Sons of Cyrus - Trigger-Happy (2006)
- Spiders - Killer Machine (2018)
- Strängen - Rock på svenska (2018)
- Troubled Horse - Revolution On Repeat (2017)
- The Turpentines - By Popular Demand (1999)
- Turbo - Eu Sou Spartacus (2015)
- Turbo - O Melhor Naufrágio (2017)
- Versus You - Moving On (2014)
- White Flag - Eternally Undone (1999)
- White Flag - Extraordinary Renditions (2011)
- White Flag - Various singles and compilations
- Wilmer X – 13 våningar upp (2005)
- Wilmer X – 4X4 EP (2005)
- Zoo Party - Lardass (2018)

Other studio work

- Blue for Two – Songs From A Pale & Bitter Moon (1988)
- Blue for Two – International (1993)
- Blue for Two – Earbound (1994)
- Capricorn - (Fight) Another Day / She Loves The Thunder (2019)
- Cortex - 1987 (2019)
- Destiny - Atomic Winter (1987)
- Robert Johnson and Punchdrunks – Fried on the Altar of Good Taste (2000)
- Southern Voodoo – Devil's Drive (2007)
- Thåström – Xplodera Mig 2000 (1991)
- Union Carbide Productions – Financially Dissatisfied Philosophically Trying (1989)
