= Elevator girl =

Elevator girl may refer to:

- Elevator operator
- "Elevator Girl", a 2019 song by Babymetal
- Elevator Girl, a 2010 Hallmark Channel Original Movie
- "Elevator Girl", a 1993 song by Psychotic Youth
