= Henryk Lipp =

Record producer

- Born: 2 August 1955 (age 70)
- Occupation(s): musician, songwriter
- Formerly of: Extra; Blue for Two

Henryk Lipp is a Polish-born Swedish musician, songwriter and music producer from Gothenburg, Sweden.

== Beginnings ==
He started his musical career in the late 1970s and early 1980s with the Swedish band Extra alongside Anne-Lie Rydé, among others.

== In Blue for Two ==
In 1984, he teamed up with Freddie Wadling to form the alternative rock duo Blue for Two with Wadling on vocals and Lipp as songwriter and on synthesizer. They went on to release a number of albums including with Wadling (on vocals) and Henryk Lipp as songwriter and synthesizers. They had a string of albums including Blue for Two (1986), Songs from a Pale and Bitter Moon (1988), Search & Enjoy (1992), Earbound (1994) and Moments (1997). The band became very popular and one of the main bands in the Swedish alternative scene in the 1980s. For their live performances, they were often accompanied by Sator guitarist Chips Kiesbye. The duo also made a comeback in 2012 with the album Tune the Piano, Hand Me a Razor reaching No. 18 in the Swedish Albums Chart.

== Producing ==
After the break-up of Blue for Two, Lipp concentrated on a music writing and producing career. He works through "Music A Matic Studio", established in 1982 as a partnership between producer Lipp and fellow producer Chips Kiesbye.

Among the artists Lipp has produced at various times include:

- Burst
- Dead Man
- Millencolin
- Håkan Hellström
- Sator
- Stonefunkers
- Thåström
- Union Carbide Productions

He was also a guest musician for Swedish band Destiny
