= Jean-Louis Huhta =

Swedish musician (born 1965)

Jean-Louis Patrik Huhta
- Born: 30 April 1965 (age 60); Gothenburg, Sweden
- Genres: Punk; post-punk; hardcore; art music; grindcore; funk; hip hop; go-go music
- Occupations: Musician
- Instruments: Drums, percussion
- Member of: Dungeon Acid; Audio Laboratory; Brommage Dub; High Boys; Ocsid
- Formerly of: Cortex; Anti Cimex; Texas Instruments; Lucky People Center; Stonefunkers; The Skull Defekts; Flesh Quartet; Disco 3000; 413

Jean-Louis Patrik Huhta (born 30 April 1965) is a Swedish musician. He has played in various bands going back through the mid 1980s, ranging from punk and art music to grindcore and funk.

== Career ==
Huhta began his musical career in the early 1980s as a member of Freddie Wadling's post-punk band Cortex. He later joined the hardcore band Anti Cimex, in which he played percussion between 1984 and 1987. Since then, he has participated in various groups and experimental art projects. Together with Texas Instruments, he created rhythm-based industrial noise and as a member of the art collective Lucky People Center, he found his way to contemporary dance music. He has also dabbled in funk, hip hop, and go-go music with Stonefunkers. With The Skull Defekts, he toured the United States in 2009.

== Personal life ==
Huhta's father hails from Trinidad, and his mother was from Tervola, Finland. He moved to Stockholm from Gothenburg in the 1990s and lives in Copenhagen, Denmark since 2018.

== Selected discography ==
=== As Jean-Louis Huhta ===
- Between the World and Death (2007)
- No History No Future (2015)

=== As Dungeon Acid ===
- Bliss (2012)
- Live Somewhere in NYC (2016)
- Dungeon Acid (2019)

=== With Zbigniew Karkowski and Lars Åkerlund ===
- Horology (2013)
- A Bird in the Hand Is Worth Two in the Bush (2016)
