= Bbs Paranoicos =

Chilean hardcore punk band

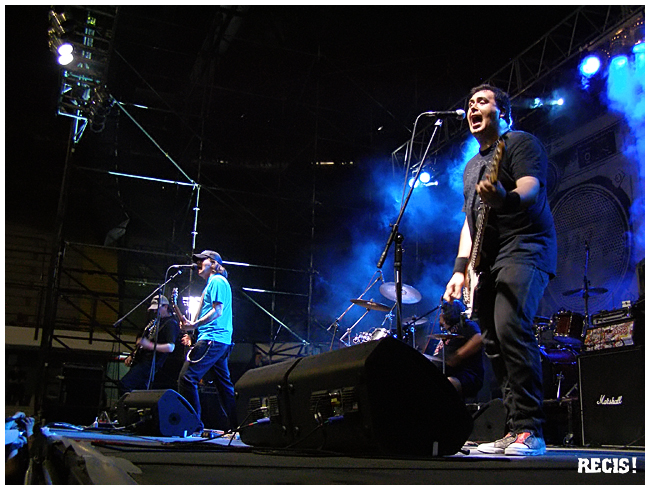
- Live at "Family Day Festival", 2008.

Background information
- Origin: Santiago, Chile
- Genres: Melodic hardcore, punk rock, hardcore punk
- Years active: 1991
- Labels: Ta Ke Sale!, Alerce, M&M, Oveja Negra, Toxic, Deifer, Alerta, Compañía Independiente Vasca
- Members: Carlos Kretchmer; Pedro López; Juan Herrera
- Past members: Alex Patiño; Daniel Tobar; Cedric Otero; Boyle; Memo; Omar Acosta †
- Website: bbsparanoicos.cl

Bbs Paranoicos is a Chilean hardcore punk band formed in 1991. They are one of the most popular punk bands in Chile.

Bands like Lagwagon, Rise Against, Alkaline Trio, No Use For A Name, Descendents, All and Bad Religion have been cited as influences by the band. The band is a staple in important punk rock concerts and festivals in the country and has opened for popular international acts such as Misfits, Circle Jerks, Dead Kennedys, No Use For A Name, Millencolin, Siniestro Total, Lagwagon, MXPX, No Fun at All, Pennywise, Green Day and Negu Gorriak, among others. BBs Paranoicos has toured extensively in Chile throughout the band's existence and has also played in Argentina, Peru, Brazil, Uruguay and Spain, with significant stakes such as "Cumbre del Rock 2009" and "Lollapalooza Chile 2012", Cosquiìn Rock and Mexico's Domination Fest 2019.

== Members ==
Current members

- Carlos Kretchmer – vocals, bass (since 1991)
- Pedro López – guitars, backing vocals (since 1991)
- Juan Herrera – drums (1991–2005, since 2009)
- Ignacio Araya – guitars (since 2022)

Former members

- Alex Patiño – lead vocals (1991–1999)
- Cedric – guitars (1994–1999)
- Boyle – drums (1991)
- Daniel Tobar – drums (2005–2009)
- Memo – drums (2003–2005)
- Omar Acosta – lead vocals, guitars (1996–2022) †

== Discography ==
Studio albums

- Incierto Final (1993, Sello Alerce)
- Fábricas Mágicas... Lápidas Tétricas (1995, Toxic)
- Hardcore Para Señoritas (1997, Ta Ke Sale!/Deifer)
- Collage (1999, Ta Ke Sale!/Alerce/Alerta)
- Algo no Anda (2000, Ta Ke Sale!/Discos Suicidas)
- Capital (2003, Alerce)
- Antídoto (2008, M&M)
- Cruces (2014, Bolchevique, Inhumano)
- Delusional (2018, Pulpa Discos, Inhumano)

Slipts

- BBS Paranoicos / E.M.S. (2001)
- BBS Paranoicos / Desperate Cry (2010)
- BBS Paranoicos / White Flag (2012)

Live albums

- La Victoria Del Perdedor (2008)

Compilation albums

- Escasos Exitos. The history of BBS Paranoicos (Paranoia Recordings, 2001)
- Cambia El Tiempo (Antología 1993 - 2003) (Alerce, 2003)

Demos

- Dulces Bebés Paranoicos (1991)

EPs

- El Ensayo (2000, Ta0KeSale!)
- Uno (2005)
- Dos (2005)
