= Stonefunkers =

Swedish music group

The Stonefunkers
- Origin: Sweden
- Genres: Funk, hip hop
- Years active: 1987–2001; 2009–
- Members: M-Rock; Top-Steen; ADL; Davono; Fredrik (Fronkpac) Jahn; Conan; Cheezo; Jean-Louis Huhta; Storm; Gonzo
- Past members: Papa Dee; MC Cane; Frenzy Jay/Frans James; Gavin Smart; Peter Towers

Stonefunkers is a Swedish funk, go-go and live hip hop band started by brothers Emrik and Torsten Larsson that was one of the first Swedish bands to play "urban"-style music.

== Career ==
Both Larssons spent a year in the US studying American culture and picking up on the soul and funk scene.

Emrik went to high school in Rochester, New York and soon found out that a lot of the hot bands usually stopped to play in Rochester. During his year he got to see artists ranging from George Clinton with Parliament, D-Train, Tyrone Brunson, to Slave and Steve Arrington and also witnessed his first hip hop performance by Double Trouble (known through the hip hop movie Wild Style).

Torsten went to Minneapolis and soon got into the rock scene but couldn't get away from that cities powerful funk movement led by Prince, The Time, André Cymone and others.

Back in Sweden they both felt the urge to start a funk band. Torsten had previously played the bass in various punk/rock bands, and Emrik had done some singing in different choirs and also had a leading part in a musical.

They recruited their old skateboard pal Christian on drums, a neighbour on bass, Emrik's friend David on Moog and Prophet synthesizers, and Torsten switched to guitar. Torsten came up with the name during a skate session.

In 1987 they became the first Swedish band to be interviewed on the Swedish radio show Soul Corner, a radio program covering African-American music.

The early Stonefunk sound was guitar-driven rock funk influenced by Jimi Hendrix, Rose Royce and Sly Stone. In 1987 they were considered one of Gothenburg’s most energetic and exciting live bands and they recorded their first single, "Turn it Up", released in May 1988 on small indie label Radium.

In autumn 1989 they started to work on their first full-length album, Hard as Kryptonite, with producer Christian Falk (later known for his work with Neneh Cherry, Blacknuss all-stars and Robyn). During the recording of the album, the group was joined by toastingstyle-rapper Papa Dee, who brought in more evident hip hop influences than there were on the two previous singles. Drummer & percussion player Jean-Louis Huhta also joined the band at this time, which resulted in more inspirations from the go-go of Washington D.C. (groups like Trouble Funk and EU).

Stonefunkers lineup 1989:

- Vocals – Emrik (M-rock) Larsson,
- Guitar – Torsten (Topsteen) Larsson,
- Moog – David (Davono) Selvert
- Keyboards - Fredrik (Fronkpac) Jahn
- Drums – Christian (Cheeze) Ekerfors
- Percussion – Jean-Louis Huhta
- Rap – Daniel (Papa Dee) Wahlgren
- Bass – Magnus (Conan) Corneliusson.

In 1990 the group switched labels to Warner, who decided to remix Hard as Kryptonite for an international release entitled Harder than Kryptonite. This remixed version of the album had a jazz-hip hop/Native Tongues direction and new added rap verses. Papa Dee also left the band and embarked on a solo career. The band decided to recruit rapper MC Cane (Marc Eastmond), with whom they recorded a brand new De La Soul-inspired new single entitled "Can U Follow". The song became a huge dance-floor hit and the video was shown on MTV Europe on a regular basis. The album Harder than Kryptonite was released all around Europe in 1991 and Stonefunkers also embarked on their first European tour, visiting the Nordic countries and Germany.

With MC Cane still the main rapper the band recorded the 12" single LPC (Lucky People Center), a celebration of percussionist Jean-Louis Huhta club nights of the same name. The actual club featured Ambient house/Trance genres of music but this single was yet another Native Tongues inspired hip hop track. The single was a hit on Swedish radio.

In 1992 they started to work on their next album with producer Henryk Lipp. By this time MC Cane had left for a career in graphic design, and today works for one of Sweden's most prestigious and award-winning advertising agencies, Forsman & Bodenfors. The band got a new rapper, ADL, brother of percussionist Jean-Louis Huhta. ADL had previously appeared in the videos for Bass Race and Can U Follow and added rap verses on two of the tracks on the Harder than Kryptonite remixes album. The album No problem ’94 (non-believers stand back!) was a huge hit in the spring of ’93 and spawned two big hit singles, "M-rock theory" and "Funkadeena".

The recording stint with Warner came to an end in 1994 and Stonefunkers were signed to Stockholm Records subsidiary Breakin’ Bread. They recorded the next album in Haarlem, the Netherlands and also toured the Benelux countries extensively. The effort made in the Netherlands came out in the form of a Material-heavy P-funk-influenced album. The album contained the singles "Wreck the show" and "Individuality" but never made an impact in Sweden. The response to the album was greater abroad and Stonefunkers embarked on yet another tour that took them to Austria, Switzerland and other countries.

In 1996 ADL left the band to work on his solo project Absent Minded, and the band decided to continue without a rapper and instead put more focus on the vocals of lead singer Emrik "M-rock" Larsson. In 1998 Stonefunkers signed a deal with Swedish label Independent Records and immediately began putting down tracks for the new album. Band member Torsten served as the project's producer and the album Outststanding was finished in August 1998.

=== Breakup and solo work ===
Torsten Larsson says, "The Poland tour around 95–96 have been our absolute low point, just a guitar, a bassynt, drums and tons of alcohol!" After a few key members left and a disastrous argument about the lack of sales, the group broke up. The band officially disbanded in 2001, but performed live for the last time in 1999.

Guitar player and leader of the group, Torsten "Topsteen" Larsson, would go on and become a successful sound engineer and producer and in following years would work with such acts as Roxette, Olle Ljungström,. The Royal Beat conspiracy and The Soundtrack of our Lives.

M-Rock/Emrik would record three solo albums experimenting with punk, soul music, folk and singer songwriter styles of music. In 2000, he and a few other members of the stonefunk crew contribute to the compilation album GAIS Rocks Da House in support of the football club GAIS under the name Stenkross.

=== Reformation ===
In 2009 the band reformed and embarked on a short Swedish tour with yet another series of concerts lined up for the summer of 2010, starting with a gig Stockholm, 23 April.

The current members are:

- Vocals and rap – M-Rock(Emrik Larsson)
- Guitar – Top-Steen (Torsten Larsson)
- Rap – ADL
- Keyboards – Davono
- Keyboards - Fredrik (Fronkpac) Jahn
- Bass – Conan
- Percussion – Cheezo
- Percussion – Jean-Louis Huhta
- Percussion – Storm
- Percussion – Gonzo

== Trivia ==
In 2010, Spanish band La calle del ritmo covered the track Can U Follow.

== Albums ==
- Hard as Kryptonite (1989)
- Harder than Kryptonite (1991)
- No problem 94 – Non-believers stand back! (1993)
- Material (1995)
- Outstanding (1998)

== Videos ==
- Can U Follow
- M-Rock Theory
- Wreck The Show
- Individuality
