= White Flag (band) =

American punk rock band

- Origin: Sunnymead, California
- Genres: Punk rock
- Years active: 1982–present
- Label: Gasatanka Records
- Members: Jello B. Afro; Mike Mess; Trace Element
- Past members: Pat Fear; Doug Graves; El Fee; Al Bum; Pick Z. Stix; Bruce Wingate; Greg Hetson; Steven Shane McDonald; Michael Scott Calhoun; Ken Dector; Ronnie Barnett; Kim Shattuck; Duke Seino; Randy Robbins; John Butler; Ken Stringfellow; Viv Vacuum; Jim Laspesa; El Swe; Victor M. Surrounded

White Flag is an American punk rock band currently based in Los Angeles. Their current lineup consists of frontman Mike Mess (guitar), Jello B. Afro (bass), and Trace Element (drums). These members have been in the band since 1982, though many have rotated in and out. White Flag has a discography that ranges from their 1982 debut R is for Rocket to 2010's Benefit For Cats.

== History ==
White Flag formed in 1982 in Sunnymead, a community in California's Inland Empire, which is now part of the city of Moreno Valley. The original core lineup, which included Pat Fear, Trace Element, Doug Graves, and El Fee, self-released their debut album S Is for Space the same year.

In contrast to other bands at the time, White Flag took an anti-drug, pro-Reagan, anti-communist, pro-Christian stance as a satirical image, with Fear dressing up as a police officer.

They played their first two shows in the summer of 1982 at keg parties, before opening a show for Black Flag. A live version of this third show was included on the 25th anniversary deluxe reissue of S Is for Space. This version of the lineup featured Al Bum on lead vocals.

In a 1983 Flipside interview, guitarist Pat Fear noted:

People give us a lot of shit for being called 'White Flag' and that we're ripping off Black Flag and all the Black Flag bros in Long Beach want to kill us — but the truth is Black Flag are our friends, Henry [Rollins] is like our biggest fan. So why are these Black Flag people trying to kick our asses? The whole reason for the name is to reintroduce anarchy back into the musical aspect of punk, because when it started out it wasn't political and it was not violent, like when Johnny Rotten said...he was not singing about anarchy, he wanted musical anarchy. Not social or government anarchy or violence and people blew it out of proportion.... So we're trying to get back to an anarchistic state of music...

In 1984, the band released the album Third Strike, which featured Social Distortion singer Mike Ness singing harmonies on the song "Middle Class Hell".

While mostly inactive in the 1990s, they released the album Eternally Undone in 1999. In 2006 White Flag toured in Italy for the first time. As a souvenir of the group's first visit, the band released a limited edition, hand numbered 8 song 10-inch vinyl album, on Roma based RARO! Records, entitled "Piangi Con Me", which is now out of print.

In 2008, the band toured Europe twice, first in March (Germany and Netherlands), and then in June–July they did 23 gigs, including two with NOFX and the Adolescents. Some gigs in the U.S. with the Germs and the Adolescents followed.

In May 2010, the band released the 7-inch e.p. "Keepers of The Purple Twilight" on Target Earth Records limited to 300 copies. 2010 also saw the release of "Benefit For Cats" on Cupcake Records.

In 2011, Strange Magic Records released White Flag and Tony Adolescent's "Live at Bohemian Grove / White Flag & Tony" 7-inch EP. That same year the band, who were big fans of 1970s seminal punk group The Runaways contributed the track "C'mon" to the controversial tribute album "Take It Or Leave It: A Tribute To The Original Queens of Noise: The Runaways". The song featured Michael Lee Smith, lead singer of the band Starz on lead vocals.

The current line-up, featured on the July 2010 vinyl only release "Benefit For Cats", performed their first Midwest shows in July 2010. With shows in Detroit, Cleveland, and Chicago, on July 15,16, and 17 respectively. The shows were record release parties for the album, as well as for the Russian release limited edition 7-inch e.p. "Two Pack", which is limited to only 100 copies, and is a split release with Russian band Citramons.

Pat Fear died on September 24, 2013. The band continued on with members Trace Element, Jello B. Afro, and Mike Mess.

== Members ==
The punk rock names of band members were chosen to parody those of Jello Biafra, Mike Ness, and Pat Smear.

=== Current lineup ===
- Jello B. Afro- bass and vocals, 1982–1984, 2007–present
- Mike Mess- guitar, bass, and vocals, 1984, ???–present
- Trace Element- drums and vocals

=== Former members ===
- Pat Fear- bass, guitar, keyboards, sitar, vocals
- Doug Graves
- El Fee
- Al Bum- lead vocals
- Pick Z. Stix- drums
- Ken Stringfellow (credited as "Kim Crimson")- bass, drums, guitar, keyboard, vocals
- Kent Crimson
- Jim Tiligiant- bass, drums, guitar, vocals
- Viv Vacuum- bass, guitar, vocals
- Eric Erlandson
- Kim Shattuck
- Ronnie Barnett
- Duke Seino
- El Swe
- Victor M. Surrounded- drums

== Discography ==
White Flag has a large discography. This is an incomplete list:

=== Studio albums ===
- R is for Rocket (1982)
- S is for Space (1983)
- Third Strike (1984)
- (WFO) (1985)
- Feeding Frenzy (1986)
- Peace (1986)
- Zero Hour (1986)
- Wild Kingdom (1987)
- Skate Across America (1995)
- Eternally Undone (2001)
- History is Fiction (2002)
- T Is For Twenty (2006)
- Benefit For Cats (2010)

=== Eps and 7-inches ===
- Suicide King (1987)
- Freedom Fighters (1988)
- R is for Rad (1989)
- Within You Without You (1990)
- Don't Give It Away (1992)
- White Rabbit (1993) (Sympathy for the Record Industry)
- 3rd Sun Mower (1993)
- Novocaine (1995)
- On The Way Down (1999)
- Piangi Con Me (2006)
- Keepers of The Purple Twilight (2010)
- Live At Bohemian Grove / White Flag & Tony (2011)

=== Splits ===
- White Flag/Adrenalin O.D. LP (1986)
- Peace cassette (1986) (split with F)
- Jail Jello! (1987) (split with Necros)
- Young Girls (1990) – White Flag & Tony Adolescent
- White Flag & Dave Nazworthy 7" (1991)
- Hot Rails to Hell (1991) (split with Tesco Vee)
- Sator Vs. White Flag (1994)
- White Flag/Baby Demons (2008)
- Two Pack Split (2010)
- Levitate The Listener (with Versus You) (2011)
- White Flag / Crise Total (2011)
- Extraordinary Renditions (with Gods of Gamble) (2011)
- Og Bo Toyy – Bbs Paranoicos and White Flag (2012)
- White Flag/Shoplifters (2013)

=== Compilation albums ===
- Sgt. Pepper (1987)
- Thru the Trash Darkly (1993)
- Step Back 10 (1996)
- R is for Rocket, U is for Unreleased (2003)
- T Is For Twenty (2006)
- Counterclockwise (2007)
- Wild Kingdom/Zero Hour/Sgt. Pepper (2008)

=== Live albums ===
- Bleedin' In Sweden (1986)
- History is Fiction (2003)

=== Albums contributed to ===
- The Sound of Hollywood 3—Copulation (Mystic Records, 1984)
- Eat Me (BCT, 1984)
- Desperate Teenage Lovedolls (1984)
- Flipside Vinyl Fanzine Volume 1 (Gasatanka, 1984)
- Mystic Sampler #3 (Mystic, 1986)
- Another Shot for Bracken (Positive Force, 1986)
- Rat Music for Rat People, Vol. 3 compilation (CD Presents, 1987)
- 4 Bands That Could Change the World (Gasatanka, 1987)
- Every Band Has a Shonen Knife Who Loves Them (Gasatanka, 1989)
- Gabba Gabba Hey: A Tribute to the Ramones (Triple X Records, 1991)
- Freedom of Choice: Yesterday's New Wave Hits As Performed By Today's Stars (1992)
- Germs (Tribute) - A Small Circle Of Friends compilation (1996)
- Short Music for Short People (1999)
- Jardim Elétrico: A Tribute to Os Mutantes (2007)
- Take It Or Leave It - A Tribute To The Queens of Noise: The Runaways (2011)
