= The Jackpots =

Swedish band

The Jackpots, originally known as the Flintstones, was a Swedish progressive-styled pop group, formed in 1964 in Gothenburg. The band's 1968 lineup was lead singer Lars Berndtsson, guitarist Lars-Erik Göransson, bassist Bo Linnell, pianist/organist Lasse Larsson and drummer Rune Conny Hagberg.

== Career highlights ==
The Jackpots released four albums, "Tic Tac Toe" in 1967, "Jack In The Box" in 1968, "Dans, Dans, Dans" in 1973 and "Våra Bästa Låtar" in 1976.

The Jackpots were popular in Sweden, Belgium and Denmark. They sang in four-part harmonies, as can heard in the "Jack In The Box" single, where backwards recording techniques were used, which for that time had an impressive sound.

== Collaborations ==
Graham Gouldman and Eric Stewart, later of 10cc, contributed with songs for the Jackpots. Perry Ford who was a member of the English pop trio, Ivy League, also contributed with Lincoln City.

== Discography ==
Date	Title (A-side/B-side)	Label	Notes
1967	"Miss Judith Lee" / "Will You Love Me Tomorrow"	Sonet UP-115	Japan
