= Freddie Wadling =

Swedish singer (1951–2016)

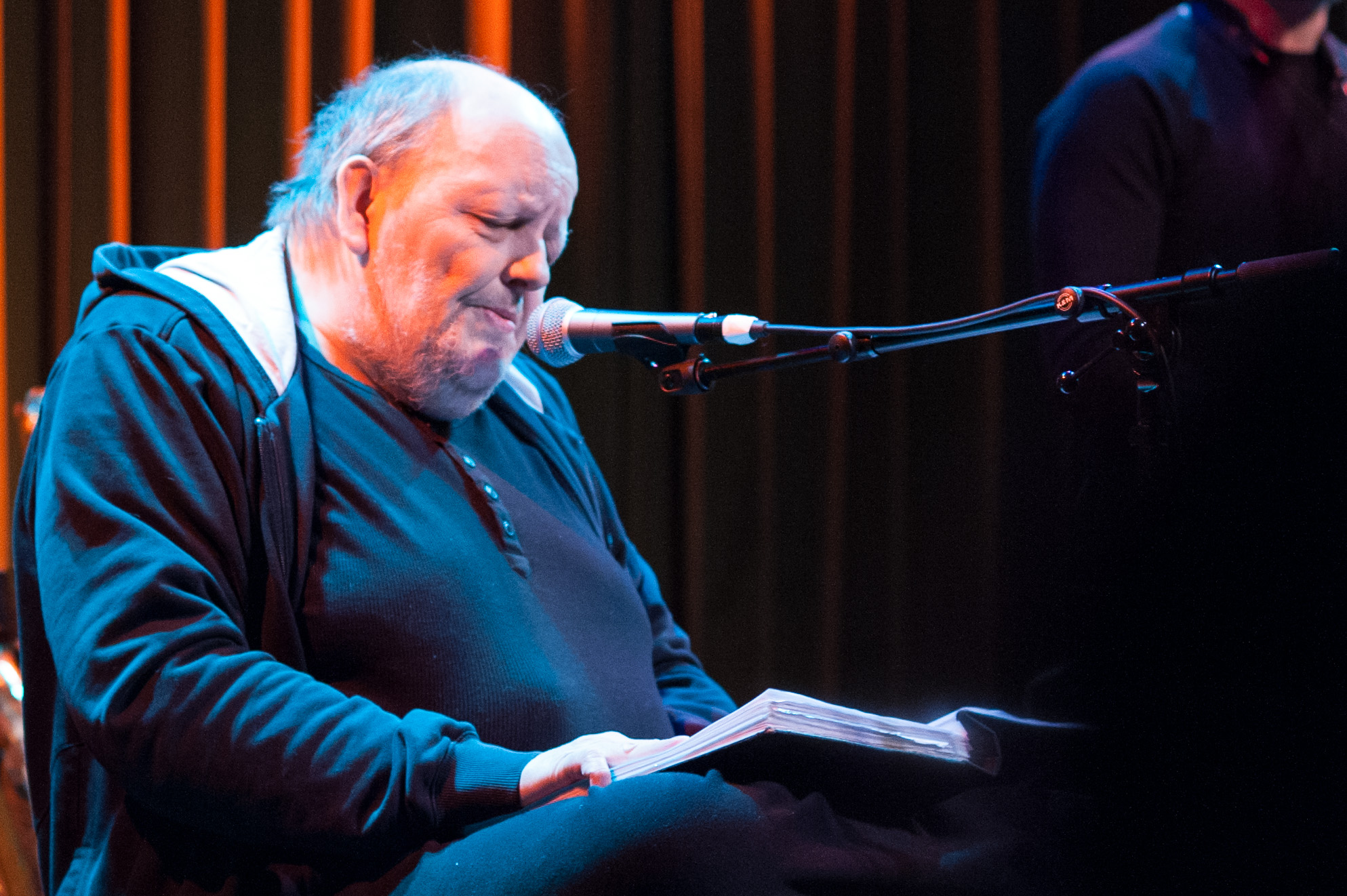
- Wadling performing in 2011

Background information
- Born: Berndt Arvid Freddie Olsson; 2 August 1951; Gothenburg, Sweden
- Died: 2 June 2016 (aged 64) Gothenburg, Sweden
- Genres: Rock, punk
- Occupations: Singer, songwriter
- Years active: 1979–2016
- Formerly of: Liket Lever; Cortex; Straitjacket; Leather Nun; Blue for Two; Fleshquartet

Berndt Arvid Freddie Wadling (2 August 1951 – 2 June 2016) was a Swedish singer born in Gothenburg, whose over-thirty-year musical career extended from punk to classical ballads.

== Band member ==
Wadling played bass in a number of bands during the 1970s and early 1980s. One notable band was Liket Lever (which translates as "the corpse lives"). In the early 1980s, he joined the cult band Cortex. During this period, Cortex released the album Spinal Injuries, in 1983. The track "The Freaks", sung by Wadling, became a signature song for him and was used in the soundtrack to Tjenare Kungen. He also played in the bands Straitjacket, Leather Nun, and Fleshquartet. Wadling was also featured in band Kingdom of Evol.

== Blue for Two ==
In the 1980s and 1990s, Wadling was the vocalist of the alternative pop/rock duo Blue for Two. The duo, which also included Henryk Lipp on synthesizers, was formed in Gothenburg in 1984. They released a string of albums, including Blue for Two (1986), Songs from a Pale and Bitter Moon (1988), Search & Enjoy (1992), Earbound (1994), and Moments (1997). For their live performances, they were often accompanied by Sator guitarist Chips Kiesbye. Blue for Two made a comeback in 2012 and released the album Tune the Piano and Hand Me a Razor, which reached No. 18 on the Swedish Albums Chart.

== Solo career ==
Wadling developed a successful solo career, releasing a large number of albums. He recorded songs by John Dowland with the Forge Players in 1998, as well as the acclaimed En skiva till kaffet (1999) and Jag är monstret (2005). The latter also contains collaborations with Thomas Öberg, Per Gessle, and Tomas Andersson Wij. He also recorded soundtracks with Magne Furuholmen and Kjetil Bjerkestrand.

He was awarded the Cornelis Vreeswijk Prize in 2005.

In 2011, Wadling released the album With a Licence to Kill, featuring songs from the James Bond franchise. It reached No. 12 on the Swedish Albums Chart. In 2016, he published Efter Regnet, which reached No. 7 on the Swedish Albums Chart.

== Death ==
Wadling died on 2 June 2016 at the age of 64.

== Discography ==
=== Albums ===
with Cortex

- Spinal Injuries (1981)
- You Can't Kill the Boogeyman (1986)

with Blue for Two

- Blue for Two (1986)
- Songs from a Pale and Bitter Moon (1988)
- Search & Enjoy (1992)
- Earbound (1994)
- Moments (1997)
- Tune the Piano and Hand Me a Razor (2012)

with Mother

- LP (2008)

Solo

- Something Wicked This Way Comes (1989)
- Picnic on a Frozen River (Compilation, 1991)
- The Dice Man (Compilation, 1991)
- A Soft-Hearted Killer Collection (Compilation, 1997)
- En skiva till kaffet (1999)
- Skillingtryck och mordballader (2000)
- Jag är monstret (2005)
- Den mörka blomman / The Dark Flower (2009)
- With a Licence to Kill (2011)
- Efter Regnet (2016)

Featured in

- Dark Passages – Nocturnal Incidents (Kingdom of Evol featuring Freddie Wadling) (2012)
