= Versus You =

- Origin: Luxembourg
- Genres: Punk-Rock, Pop-Punk
- Years active: 2005–present
- Labels: Bomber Music, Long Beach Records, Fond of Life Records, Flix Records, Noiseworks Records, Granny Records, Winged Sull Records, G Chord Records, Guerilla Asso
- Members: Eric Rosenfeld; Giordano Bruno; Dario Bruno; Jérôme Lux
- Past members: Jimmy Leen; Pit Romersa; Mike Lahier; Aloyse Weyler; Jerry Kirpach
- Website: www.versus-you.com

Versus You is a four-piece punk rock, pop-punk band from Luxembourg, founded in 2005 by Eric Rosenfeld and Giordano Bruno. In 2014, Le Quotidien described the band, with its nearly 10-year history, as an "institution in the Luxembourg rock scene" ("une institution de la scène rock locale"). The band has released four full albums plus a split album with White Flag and toured internationally.

== History ==
=== The beginning and Marathon (2006) ===
Versus You is a four-piece punk rock band from Luxembourg that was brought to life by Eric Rosenfeld and Giordano Bruno in 2005. Long-time friends, both musicians had played in a couple of bands together and it didn't take Eric, who had a bag of songs written already, a long time to convince Giordano to join his new band on bass guitar. A few weeks later they welcomed Pit Romersa on drums, who would record their first record 'Marathon' (released in 2006 by Fond Of Life Records) with them and later leave Versus You because of his main project called Eternal Tango.

=== This Is The Sinking and first Tour (2008) ===
Drummer number two, Mike Lahier joined them shortly after and recorded a second album with the band. Although the record is entitled 'This Is The Sinking' (released by Winged Skull Records in 2008), it brought people's attention to the band. Their song 'The Hotel Room' was on top of the national charts in heavy rotation. More than 900 people showed up at the release party of the album. Versus You also played at the Rock-A-Field Festival in Roeser that year.

After a first tour through Germany, Belgium, Holland and Italy, Jimmy Leen, who would later become a second songwriter for Versus You, joined the band on guitar and opening shows for No Use For A Name and the Flatliners, with whom they became fast friends, followed. At the last Flatliners gig, Mike Lahier and Versus You parted ways due to personal differences.

Aloyse Weyler joined Versus You right on time for their first tour through Eastern Europe and Russia, shows with NOFX, Propagandhi, Only Crime, White Flag and Bayside were played.

=== The Mad Ones (2009) and Levitate the Listener (2011) ===
Their third album which they recorded live with Charel Stoltz right after they came home from tour. This proves how Versus You never really take a break. The album was entitled 'The Mad Ones' (released by Granny Records in collaboration with Fond Of Life Records in 2009), a title that revealed Eric's inspiration by writer Jack Kerouac and still remains a perfect description for the band. After a second tour through Eastern Europe and Russia and countless shows (among them Rock-A-Field again), Aloyse too leaves Versus You without a drummer.

A new drummer was found with Jerry Kirpach, who had been a friend of the band and promised to break Versus You's curse and stay with them. Versus You recorded a new single called 'This War Is Like A Drug To You!' and six more songs for a split record with White Flag. That year shows with Alkaline Trio, Strike Anywhere, Dead To Me, Dear Landlord and Star Fucking Hipsters followed. 'Levitate The Listener' (released by Long Beach Records in collaboration with G Chord Records) came out 2011.

After a huge number of shows for their quite short existence, three albums, an EP and a split record, Versus You still doesn't show any sign of slowing down any time soon.

In 2011 they shared the stage with bands like Adolescents, Mike Herrera from MXPX, Dead To Me, The Casualties, Rise Against and went on a European Tour with White Flag.

In 2012 Versus You were selected out of more than 500 bands to play the Groezrock Festival. They also recorded a new single entitled 'Happy Yet?!' with long-time producer Charel Stoltz and went to Sweden to record with producer Chips Kiesbye, who has already worked with Millencolin and The Hellacopters among others, their fourth album.

In early 2013, Jimmy left the band to focus completely on his new project named Fox. He was replaced by Giordano’s younger brother Dario Bruno who previously played in bands such as Extinct, Nervous Chillin and also The Last Millennium Suckers. Shows with Strung Out, Black Flag, The Manix and Jimmy Eat World followed.

=== Moving On (2014) ===
The latest Album entitled 'Moving On' (released by Flix Records in collaboration with G Chord Records and Noiseworks Records) was released on 14 February 2014.

The song 'Be Better Than Me', in which the Swedish singer Hannah Smallbone takes care of the female vocal part was at the beginning of 2014 in the Top 50 of the Luxembourg iTunes charts and made it to #1 on the iTunes Rock Charts Luxembourg. On 15 February 2014 the release party for the fourth album 'Moving On', recorded 2012 in the 'Music-A-Matic Recording Studios' in Gothenburg, Sweden with producer Chips Kiesbye and mixed and mastered by Henryk Lipp, was celebrated at Den Atelier in Luxembourg City. The artwork of 'Moving On', as well as for the album 'Marathon' and the split album 'Levitate The Listener' was designed by Kim "The Butcher" Schreiner.

On 12 May 2014 Versus You announced on their Facebook page, that they've signed with Bomber Music UK. The album 'Moving On' was released on 21 July 2014 in England, and from 18 to 26 July Versus You played the Moving On... ...To The Uk tour.

On 5 October 2014 Versus You released the song "Sunny Afternoon" which is a cover of the British punk godfathers The Kinks on their Facebook page, the song was created a few years earlier in the rehearsal room and was recorded with a mobile phone.

Since 20 October 2014 the album 'Moving On' and other CDs of the band are available in France over the recordlabel Guerilla Asso.

In 2014, Versus You toured Germany, Austria and the UK in support of 'Moving On'.

"Pet Sematary" a Ramones cover was published on 31 March 2015 on YouTube.com. The song was recorded and mixed 2010 by Eric Rosenfeld and former guitarist Jimmy Leen. Jimmy played the drums and Eric took over guitar, bass and vocals.

In 2015 they were selected to play at the Eurosonic Festival in Groningen in the Netherlands. Another UK tour followed from 3 to 11 April 2015 and they were one of the first bands to be selected for the Punk Rock Holiday Festival in Tolmin in Slovenia in the summer of 2015.

On 10 May 2015 Versus You published on YouTube the song "Go Ahead and Cry" a cover of Sky Saxon & The Electra-Fires. The song was recorded a few years ago for a Sky Saxon tribute album that never appeared. Bill Bartell aka Pat Fear of White Flag was the initiator of this tribute album, but died on 24 September 2013.

They were lucky enough to play with the following bands: NOFX, Alkaline Trio, No Use For A Name, Propagandhi, Rise Against, Dead To Me, The Flatliners, Dear Landlord, Forgetters, Nothington, Anti-Flag, White Flag, Star Fucking Hipsters, Strike Anywhere, Bayside, Only Crime, The Unseen, Adolescents, The Casualties, MXPX, Strung Out, Black Flag, Jupiter Jones, The Manix, Jimmy Eat World, The Gamits, Dwayne...

And lucky enough to play the following festivals: Groezrock (B), Rock-A-Field (L), Zvera Festival (LV), and are booked for the following festivals: Eurosonic (NL), Punk Rock Holiday (SLO)

=== Tenth band anniversary (2015) ===
On 18 October 2015 Versus You celebrated their tenth band anniversary under the motto: VERSUS YOU "10 years later, Old & Bald" in De Gudde Wëllen (The Good Will) in Luxembourg city. Supported by the luxembourgish instrumental band The Majestic Unicorns From Hell and the luxembourgish Hip Hop duo Freshdax.

=== Rocket To Rushmore (2016) ===
On 15 July 2016 Versus You released along with the two companioned bands Killtime from Italy and The Gamits from the United States the 3 tracks including, one song from each band 7-inch Vinyl EP Rocket To Rushmore which is limited to 333 copies.

=== You Better (2016) ===
On 20 September 2016 Versus You announced on Facebook the release of their new 7-inch Vinyl Single You Better which contains two new tracks, side A: You Better and side B: Always Follow and is available from 1 December 2016, once on black vinyl and on orange vinyl. On 28 October 2016 they announced that there will be a limited 10 year anniversary re-issue of the first album Marathon, for the first time on vinyl and new merchandise designed by their long time buddy Kim "The Butcher" Schreiner.

=== Birthday Boys EP (2017) ===
Versus You announced on 26 September 2017 on Facebook the release of their new EP Birthday Boys. The first single of the new EP, which bears the name Birthday Boy, was released on 10 October 2017 at midnight on YouTube as a so-called Lyric video. On 11 November 2017 the release festival was held in Sang a Klang at the Pfaffenthal in Luxembourg City from 2 pm onwards. For these release festival Versus You were supported by the following bands: Mind Rebellion (L), Weakonstruction (L), All The Way Down (L), Cosmogon (L), Not Scientists (F), The Majestic Unicorns From Hell (L), Everwaiting Serenade (L) and Guerilla Poubelle (F).

=== Times Of War / Let's Make Love EP (2018) ===
On 1 August 2018 Versus You released a new EP Times Of War / Let's Make Love digital on Bandcamp. Which contains both the eponymous songs.

=== Worn And Loved (2019) ===
With the single Fall Apart, released on 15 January 2019, Versus You announced their sixth album Worn And Loved, released on 15 March 2019. The release party took place the same evening at the Atelier in Luxembourg City with the support of Guerrilla Poubelle and The Majestic Unicorns From Hell.

=== Lights Out & A Collection (2009–2024) (2023-2024) ===
After releasing Worn and Loved in 2019, Versus You entered a period of relative inactivity between 2020 and 2022 due to the COVID-19 pandemic, during which the band did not rehearse or perform live.

They returned in 2023 with the digital EP Lights Out, released on September 1 and featuring three new songs. In August 2024, the band released a 15-year retrospective compilation titled A Collection (2009–2024).

In December 2024, Versus You began recording a new full-length studio album at Unison Studios in Luxembourg with producer Tom Gatti. The album was mixed and mastered by Jason Livermore at The Blasting Room in Fort Collins, Colorado, and is expected to be released in winter 2025–2026. Two singles from those sessions have been released so far: "Count on Your Tears" (December 2024) and "Phoned In" (February 2025).

The band resumed touring in 2024 and 2025, performing across Luxembourg, France, Germany, and Austria.

== Style ==
Versus You indicates that their style is inspired by punk bands such as Crimpshrine, Fifteen, Jawbreaker, The Replacements, Hüsker Dü, The Broadways and many 90's punk bands. Their songwriting is also inspired by non-punk acts such as Big Star, Alex Chilton, Tom Petty & The Heartbreakers, The Kinks and Paul Westerberg.

== Side projects ==
Eric Rosenfeld is also the guitarist and singer of the bands Adoptees, Not For Sale and Communicaution. He was also active in the bands Rise Up, Broken Stars and Timesickness.

Giordano Bruno runs the Luxembourgish record labels G Chord Records and Noiseworks Records. He was also active in the bands Broken Stars & The Last Millenium Suckers.

Dario Bruno & Jerome Lux were both active in the Hardcore Punk Band Extinct.

== Band members ==
=== Present ===
- Eric Rosenfeld – lead vocals, rhythm guitar
- Giordano Bruno – bass
- Dario Bruno – lead guitar, backing vocals
- Jérôme Lux – drums

=== Past members ===
- Jimmy Leen – lead guitar, backing vocals
- Pit Romersa – drums
- Mike Lahier – drums
- Aloyse Weyler – drums
- Jerry Kirpach – drums

== Discography ==
=== Albums ===
- 2006: Marathon – (CD, Vinyl & Digital; Fond of Life Records / New Music Distribution)
- 2008: This Is The Sinking – (CD & Digital; Winged Skull Records)
- 2009: The Mad Ones – (CD & Digital; Fond of Life Records)
- 2011: Levitate the Listener – (CD, Vinyl & Digital; Split-Album with White Flag; Long Beach Records / Broken Silence)
- 2014: Moving On – (CD, Vinyl & Digital; Flix Records / G Chord Records / Noiseworks Records / Bomber Music / Guerilla Asso)
- 2019: Worn and Loved - (CD, Vinyl & Digital; G Chord Records / Noiseworks Records / Guerilla Asso)
- 2024: A Collection (2009–2024) (Retrospective compilation)

=== EPs ===
- 2014: Be Better Than Me (digital EP just on Bandcamp)
- 2016: Rocket To Rushmore (digital and as 3 track split 7-inch Vinyl with Killtime and The Gamits limited to 333 copies; G Chord Records / Noiseworks Records) )
- 2017: Birthday Boys (digital on Bandcamp and iTunes and as 12-inch Vinyl; G Chord Records / Noiseworks Records)
- 2018: Times Of War / Let's Make Love (digital on Bandcamp)
- 2023 Lights Out (digital EP)

=== Singles ===
- "This War Is Like a Drug to You" (2014)
- "You Better" (2016)
- "Birthday Boys" (2017)
- "Count on Your Tears" (2024)
- "Phoned In" (2025)

=== Covers ===
- 2014: "Sunny Afternoon" (The Kinks cover just on YouTube.com)
- 2015: Pet Sematary (Ramones cover just on YouTube.com)
- 2015: Go Ahead And Cry (Sky Saxon & The Electra-Fires cover just on YouTube.com)
- 2017: Rosie Won't You Please Come Home (The Kinks Cover just on YouTube.com)

=== Compilations (selection) ===
- 2008: Luxembourg's Finest Rock & Pop 2008
- 2008: Luxembourg's Finest: A Selection by Rockhal Volume 1
- 2008: Luxembourg's Finest: A Selection by Rockhal Volume 2
- 2009: Taste Music: Rock Pop Made in Luxembourg
- 2009: Ox-Compilation #95
- 2010: This Is Fond of Life Records Vol. 2
- 2011: Action Culturelle: SACEM Luxembourg Volume 2
- 2012: This Is Fond of Life Records Vol. 3
- 2013: 2014: The Best Is Yet to Come! New Alternative And Indie Sounds From Cargo Digital (digital on iTunes)
- 2015: It's a Bomber (digital on iTunes)
