= Cats and Dinosaurs =

Swedish swing music band

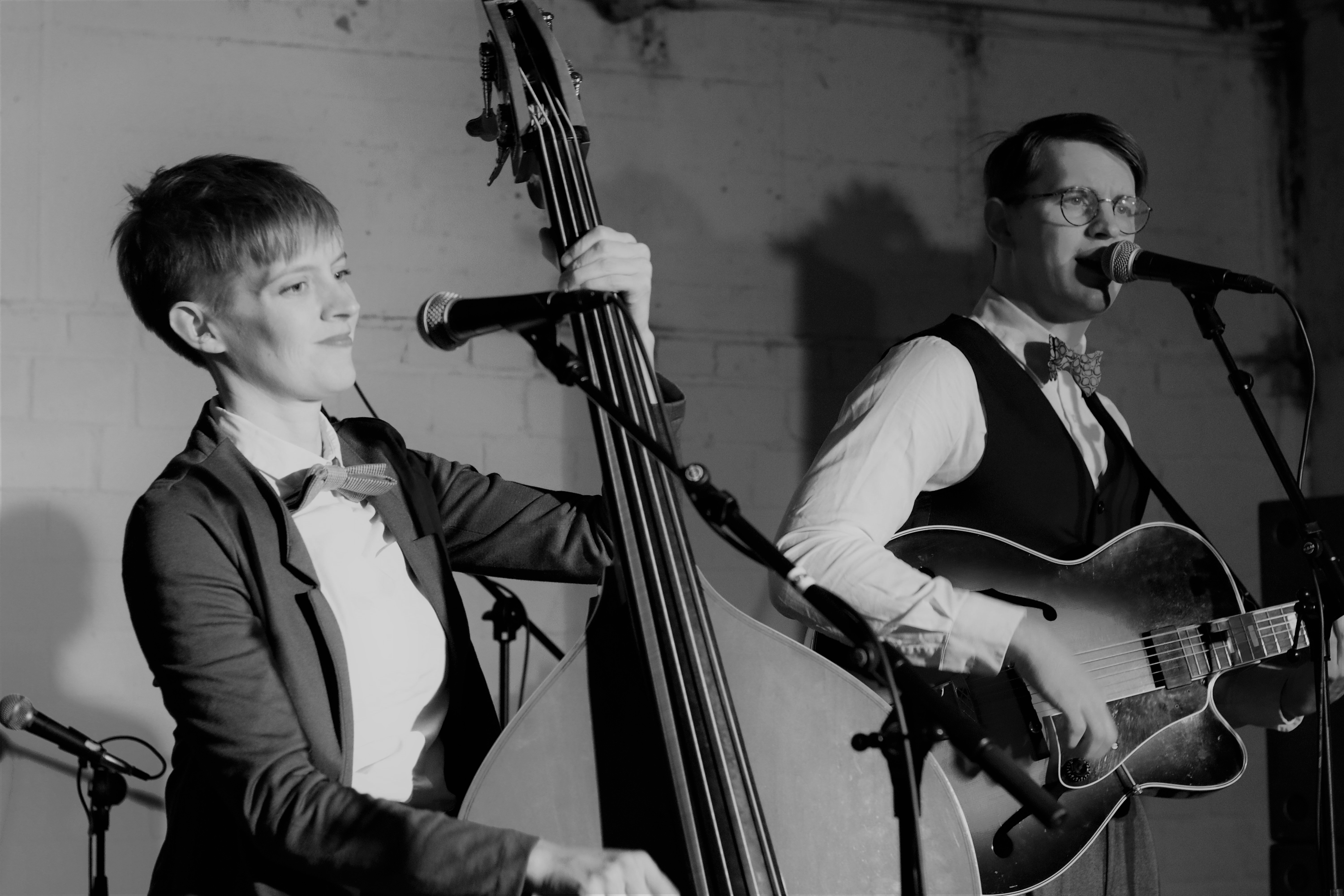
- Cats and Dinosaurs performing live in 2018

Background information
- Origin: Gothenburg, Sweden
- Genres: jazz
- Years active: 2014–
- Website: www.catsanddinosaurs.com

Cats and Dinosaurs is a Swedish swing music band from Gothenburg, with a left-wing and feminist message in their music. The band has been performing since 2014, with their main fan bases in Sweden and Germany. As of September 2024 the band consisted of nine members. The band was named by guitarist and lead vocalist and songwriter Filip Bagewits, as cats and dinosaurs are his favourite animals.

== History ==
The first band members met through sharing an apartment at various points, with them beginning to jam together. Filip Bagewitz has attributed the choice of swing music to Tove Casén Nylander dancing Lindy Hop. The band played their first gig on election day 2014 in Sweden.

The band has hosted several clubs, including Swing illegal, with the proceeds going to Ingen människa är illegal, as well as a queer Lindy club. The band arranged the world's first queer Lindy festival.

== Members ==
In 2018, the following members were reported to make up the band:

- Filip Bagewitz – vocalist, electric guitar, songwriter
- Sofia Högstadius – violin, viola
- Johan Axelsson – clarinet, baritone saxophone
- Christopher Ali Thorén – tenor saxophone
- Fia Forslund – vibraphone, marimba, percussion instruments
- David Löfberg – piano, bird whistle
- Johan Bengtsson – banjo, percussion instruments
- Tove Casén Nylander – double bass
- Julia Schabbauer – drum kit
