= Be the Bear =

Be The Bear
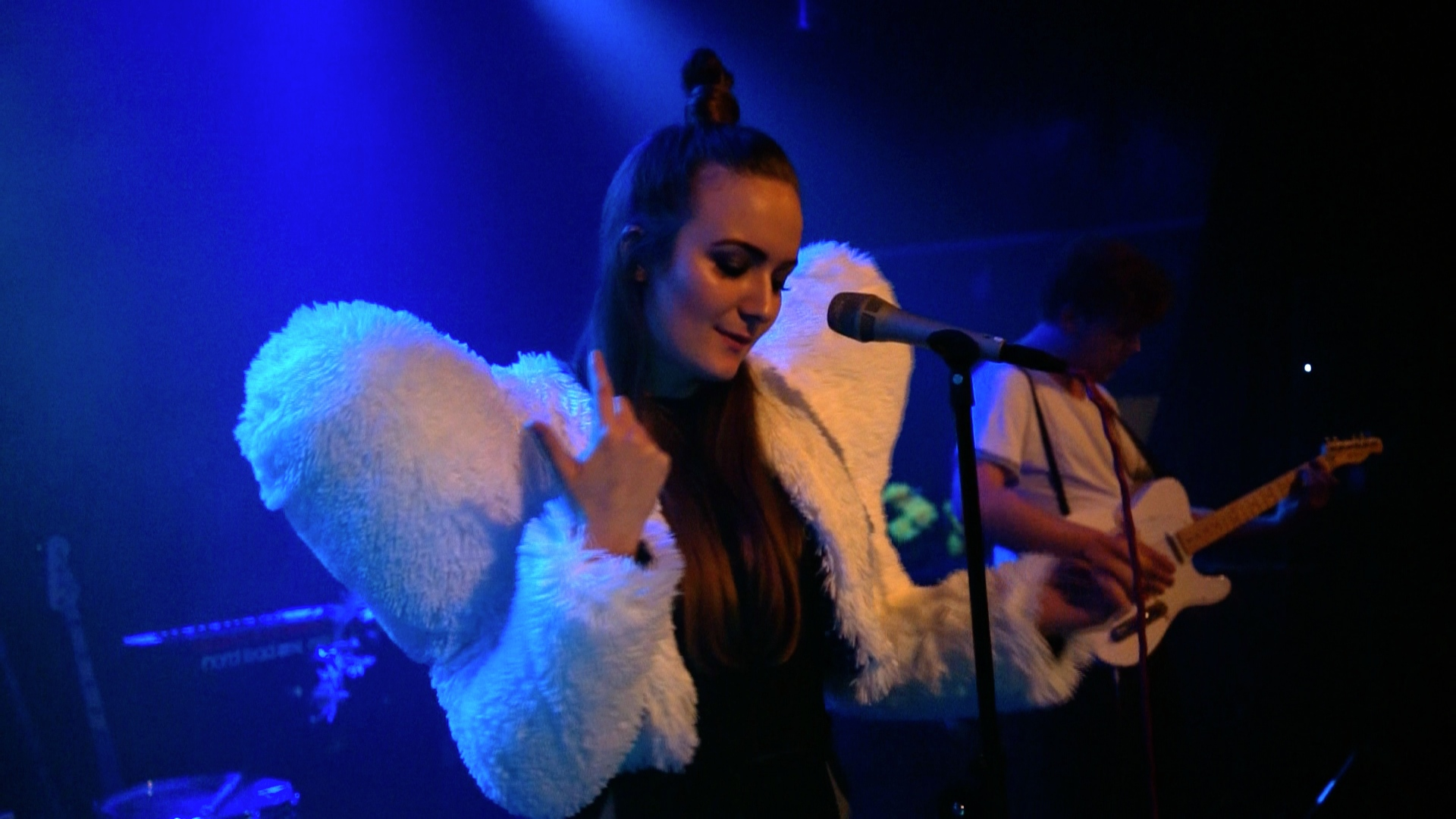
- Be The Bear live at Debaser, Sweden

Background information
- Born: Christina Julia Wehage
- Origin: Sweden
- Genres: Indie pop, electropop
- Occupations: Singer; songwriter; producer
- Years active: 2016–present
- Website: www.bethebear.se

Christina Julia Wehage, known professionally as Be The Bear, is a Swedish singer, songwriter and producer.

Previews of her two forthcoming singles, ‘’Erupt’’ and ‘’Mermaid’’, have been featured in international TV commercials. Short versions of both songs have been released on Be The Bear's YouTube channel with over 750 000 views.

== Behind the name ==
In the music press, Wehage has explained that her artist name comes from that she "used to be scared of bears. I used to dream about them every night, chasing me up old wooden staircases [...] When dreams come back again and again, I think it's because you are trying to deal with something. I wasn't facing my fears and challenging myself". "Be The Bear is like an appeal to myself to do the things that I find scary or difficult. To stand up, make noise and challenge myself and others".

=== Featured in films ===
- Det är okej att känna hopp

=== Featured in commercials ===
- Heart On A Line (Saab 9-4X)
- Barfotavisan (Blomsterlandet)
- Sparks (Volvo V70 Connected Touch)
- Song For Elliott (Volvo Family Of 60)
- Mermaid (Volvo Concept Estate)
- Erupt (Volvo Cross Country, Winter Story)
- ‘’Malibu Lover’’ (Volvo Cross Country)
