= Psychotic Youth =

Swedish punk rock band

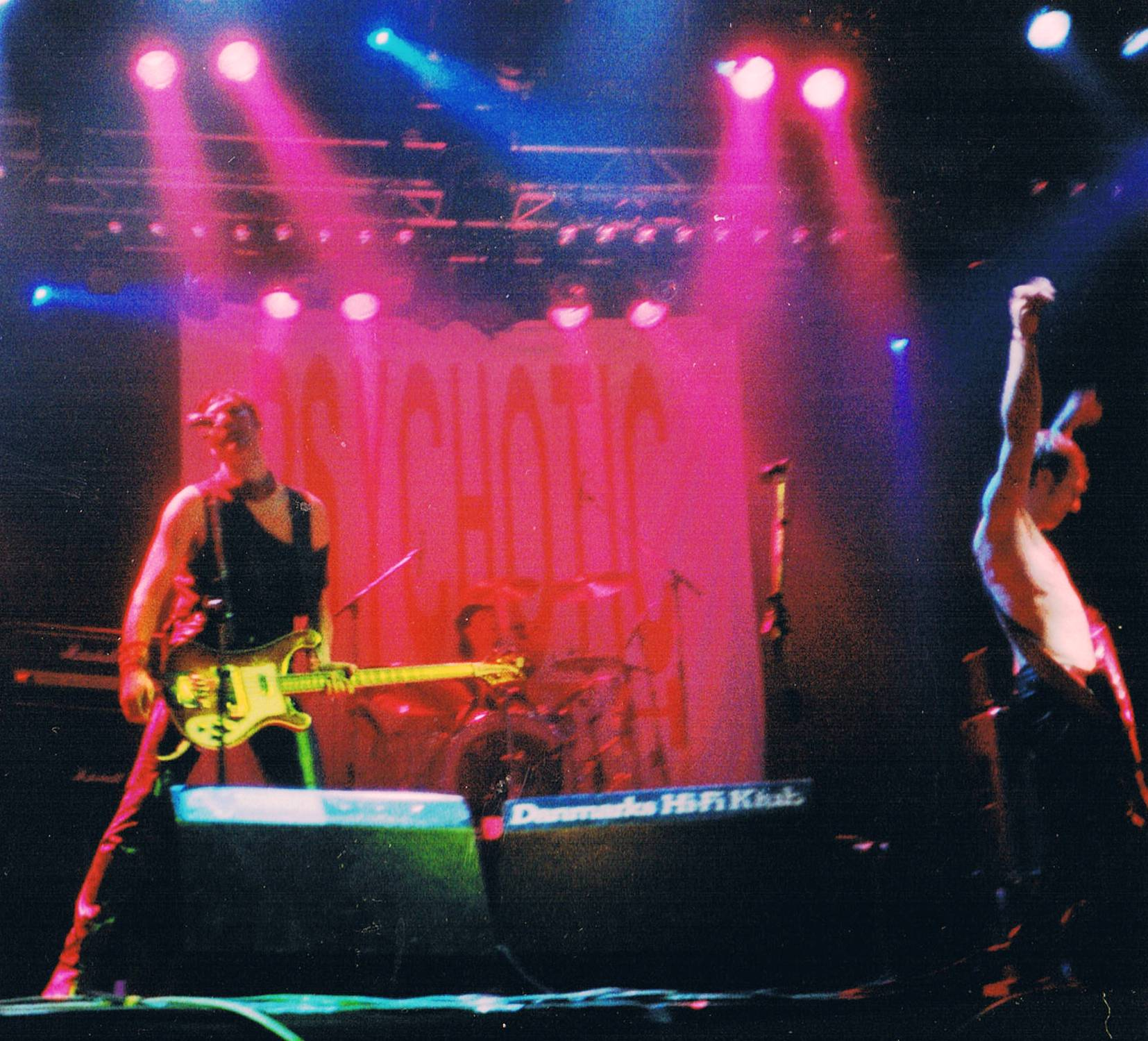
- Psychotic Youth at the Roskilde Festival 1990.

Background information
- Origin: Kramfors, Sweden
- Genres: Rock, punk rock, surf punk, rockabilly, metal, psychedelia, new wave, power pop, pop punk
- Years active: 1985 – 1999, 2015 – present
- Members: Jörgen "Red" Westman (1985-1999, 2015-); Ulf Abrahamsson (1993-1999, 2015-); Roine Lundström (2015-); Tommy Olsson (2015-); Kent Sjöholm (1985-1995, 2017-); Anders Nordstrand (1985-1988, 2017-); Gunnar Frick (1985-1995, 2015-)
- Past members: Nils Lund-Larsen (1985-1988); Magnus "Rosehip" Nyberg (1988-1993); Erik Danielsson (1988); Dennis Staaf (1995-1999); Johannes Kagelind (1995-1995); Crippa Elvis Odin (1995-1999)
- Website: Official website

Psychotic Youth is a Swedish punk rock band formed by singer, songwriter and guitarist Jörgen "Red" Westman in 1985 in Kramfors under the name Ratfink-A-Boo Boo's. The other original members besides Westman, were Kent Sjöholm on drums, Anders Nordstrand on bass, and Danish-Swede Nils Lund-Larsen on guitar. Gunnar Frick who played keyboard joined later in the year.

Psychotic Youth began as a garage rock band, influenced among others by Solna band The Nomads and the Malmö band Wilmer X. They later on incorporated various styles such as rockabilly, surf punk, metal, psychedelia and new wave / power-pop into their music.

Psychotic Youth released an initial flexi disc for Jörgen's fanzine Straight from the Grooveyard and two full-length CDs, Faster! Faster! and Anything For A Thrill with limited local success.

The band moved to Gothenburg in 1988, as a four band piece that included Jörgen Westman, Gunnar Frick, Kent Sjöholm and new recruit guitarist Magnus "Rosehip" Nyberg. For a very short time bass player Erik Danielsson joined in before quitting. After his departure, Gunnar, originally a keyboard player, became the bassist for the band.

The band released their third full-length album Some Fun in 1989 produced by Chips Kiesbye from Sator. Kiesbye also convinced the Radium 226.05 record label to sign the band. The album became a breakthrough record for the band. The single "Julie" brought in further attention to the band's music. It was followed in 1991 by another single "It Won't Be Long Before We See The Sun Shine". The band also toured substantially and performed at many music festivals finding acclaim in Sweden and to some extent internationally after gigs in Denmark, Norway, Germany, Austria and the Netherlands.

In 1992, the band released their fourth album ..Be in the Sun.. produced by Pär Edwardsson. In 1993, Magnus "Rosehip" Nyberg left to form the hardcore band Mary Beats Jane. He was replaced by guitarist Ulf Abrahamsson. The band released their fifth album Juice! produced by Chips Kiesbye resulting in two singles "Elevator Girl" and "MTV". 1994 saw the release of the 8-song Pop EP with notably a cover of Aneka's "Japanese Boy" hitting the airwaves in Sweden. In 1994, Westman established his own label Blast Records and released the full-length album Bamboozle! with a lot of materials from both Juice and Pop. The German label Wolverine Records greatly interested in Bamboozle! offered wide distribution throughout Europe. Soon after, long-time band members Kent and Gunnar left in 1995 after the German tour and were replaced by Dennis Staaf on drums and Johannes Kagelind on bass. The band was signed to MNW Records who put up a compilation album of Psychotic Youth hits in Small Wonders 1985-1996, followed by the rerelease of Faster! Faster and Anything For A Thrill in a joint release. Johannes Kagelind soon left to the United States and was replaced by veteran bassist Crippa Elvis Odin. The band's final album before their break-up, Stereoids was produced by Rune Johansson and released in 1998. The band also had two joint projects, one with Surf Trio in Splitsville in 1996 and with the Richies in Bubblepunk in 1997.

After the band disbanded in 1999, Westman formed the rockabilly band The Buckshots. In December 2005, there was a 20th anniversary reunion concert in Gothenburg and in May 2010, a 25th anniversary reunion gig in Kramfors' Folkets Park with the original members of 1985.

In 2015, Psychotic Youth reunited with partly new members by request of US artist Kurt Baker and Norwegian Morten Henriksen (The Yum Yums) to accompany them on their Scandinavian tour in April 2015. At the same time Jorgen was contacted by the Japanese label Waterslide Records who wanted to release a 30th anniversary compilation, followed by a Japan tour in February 2016. Overwhelmed by the response, the band recorded a new studio album titled The Voice of Summer which was released by the Japanese labels Waterslide/Target Earth Records in January 2017. This was followed by a number of shows and tours in Europe and added members to go alongside existing members depending on availability. The original bass player Anders Nordstrand and original drummer Kent Sjöholm are back in the band. They released their 13th studio album 21 on 25 January 2019 through Target Earth and Waterslide Records, respectively and is considered Westman’s 21st self-penned effort. On 30 October 2020, the band released a new studio album entitled Forever and Never through the Waterslide and Target Earth labels. A new joint EP (vinyl only) is to be released in autumn including the unreleased track "Silly Song". The story continues...

== Discography ==
=== Cassettes ===
- 1985: The Return of the Screaming Zombies (under the band name Ratfink-A-Boo Boo's)
- 1998: Bamboozle (Rock'n'Roller - RNR 017)

=== Albums ===
- 1986: Faster! Faster! (Rainbow Music)
- 1988: Anything For A Thrill (Garageland Records)
- 1989: Some Fun (Radium 226.05 Records)
- 1992: ...Be In The Sun... (Radium 226.05 Records)
- 1993: Juice! (Nonstop Records)
- 1994: Pop (8-track mini album on Nonstop Records)
- 1994: Bamboozle! (Nonstop Records)
- 1998: Stereoids (Blast/Wolverine Records)
- 2005: Alive on the Midnight Sun (live concert on Target Earth Records for Japanese market)
- 2017: The Voice of Summer (Waterslide/Target Earth Records)
- 2019: 21 (Waterslide/Target Earth Records)
- 2020: Forever and Never (Waterslide/Target Earth Records)
- 2023: Happy Songs (Waterslide/Target Earth Records)

Joint

- 1996: Splitsville (joint release Psychotic Youth / Surf Trio)
- 1997: Goldie Hawn/Girls Out of Reach (joint release Psychotic Youth / Richies) (Wolverine Records)
- 2000: "You Got That Uh Uh (Banana Erectors featuring Psychotic Youth) (Sympathy For The Record Industry)
- 2017: Silly Song (joint release with 3 other bands on Sigourney Records)

Compilations, and re-releases

- 1996: Small Wonders 1985-1995 (Compilation on MNW Zone)
- 1996: Faster! Faster! / Anything for a Thrill (rerelease on 1986/1988 CDs on MNW Zone)
- 1996: Juice! / Pop (rerelease on 1993/1994 album and EP on MNW Zone)
- 1999: Juicy Juice (All A and B-sides from Pop/Juice, Japanese release on Blast Beat Records)
- 1999: Juicy Pop (More A and B-side from Pop/Juice, Japanese release on Blast Beat Records)
- 2000: Stereoids (rerelease with extra 5 live tracks on BOMP Records)
- 2005: Stereoids (rerelease with 8 bonus rare recordings on Target Earth Records for Japanese market)
- 2005: Bamboozle! (10th anniversary edition with live concert included on Wolverine Records for German distribution)
- 2015: Power Pop To Die For (30 tracks for the 30th anniversary compilation released by Waterslide/Target Earth Records in Japan)

=== EPs ===
- 1986: Devils Train (4-track EP on Garageland Records)
- 2000: Leaving The 20th Century Alive (4-track EP on Gonna Puke label)

=== Singles ===
- 1985: "Johnny Too Bad" (a flexi-single on the fanzine "Straight From The Grooveyard")
- 1988: "Just Like Me" (only in France and Spain)
- 1989: "Some Fun" / "Good Times Are Gone" (Radium 226.05)
- 1989: "Julie" / "I Want It Now" (Radium 226.05)
- 1991: "It Won't Be Long Before We See The Sun Shine" (Radium 226.05)
- 1993: "Elevator Girl" (Nonstop Records)
- 1993: "MTV" (Nonstop Records)
- 1994: "Japanese Boy"
