= Blue for Two =

- Origin: Gothenburg, Sweden
- Genre: Alternative rock
- Years active: 1984–1998; 2012–2016
- Members: Freddie Wadling; Henryk Lipp

Blue for Two was a Swedish alternative pop / rock duo that started in Gothenburg in 1984 of Freddie Wadling (vocals) and Henryk Lipp (songwriter, synthesizers etc.).

== Career ==
The debut album was the self-titled Blue for Two (1986). The band became very popular and one of the main bands in the Swedish alternative scene in the 1980s. For their live performances, they were often accompanied by Sator guitarist Chips Kiesbye. The band was most active in the 1980s and the 1990s.

Blue for Two made a comeback with the album Tune the Piano, Hand Me a Razor in 2012 reaching No. 18 in the Swedish Albums Chart.

== Discography ==
=== Albums ===
Year	Album	Peak chart positions
Year	Album	SWE
1986	Blue for Two	–
1988	Songs from a Pale and Bitter Moon	43
1992	Search & Enjoy	23
1994	Earbound	–
1997	Moments	59
2012	Tune the Piano and Hand Me a Razor	18
