= Lucky People Center =

Swedish electronic music collective

Lucky People Center was a Swedish artistic collective, best known for their electronic music, which falls roughly in the ambient house/trance/sound collage genres.

The collective started as an underground illegal nightclub in Gothenburg. It moved its base to Stockholm in the early 1990s, forming a multimedia and musical collective. Lucky People Center were sporadically on tour from 1994 to 1997, and were playing some major events around Europe during this time. The collective also produced the documentary/collage films, Information is Free and Lucky People Center International.

== Members ==
Lucky People Center is supposed to be more of a loose constellation than a group, and the projects done under the name has various members. The member list is in the sleeve-notes of the album Interspecies Communication listed as David Österberg, Jean-Louis Huhta, Johan Söderberg and Skander Chand, while the film Lucky People Center International is credited to Söderberg and Erik Pauser.

== Discography ==
=== Singles ===
- "It's Still Cloudy in Saudi-Arabia", 1991
- "Rodney King" / "Live in the World", 1992
- "Ubuuntu", 1994
- "Sundance", 1995
- "To the Space", 1996
- "What Is It?", 1998
- "International", 1999

=== Albums ===
- Welcome to Lucky People Center, 1993
- Interspecies Communication, 1995
- Interference, 1999
