= Netherbird =

Swedish black metal band

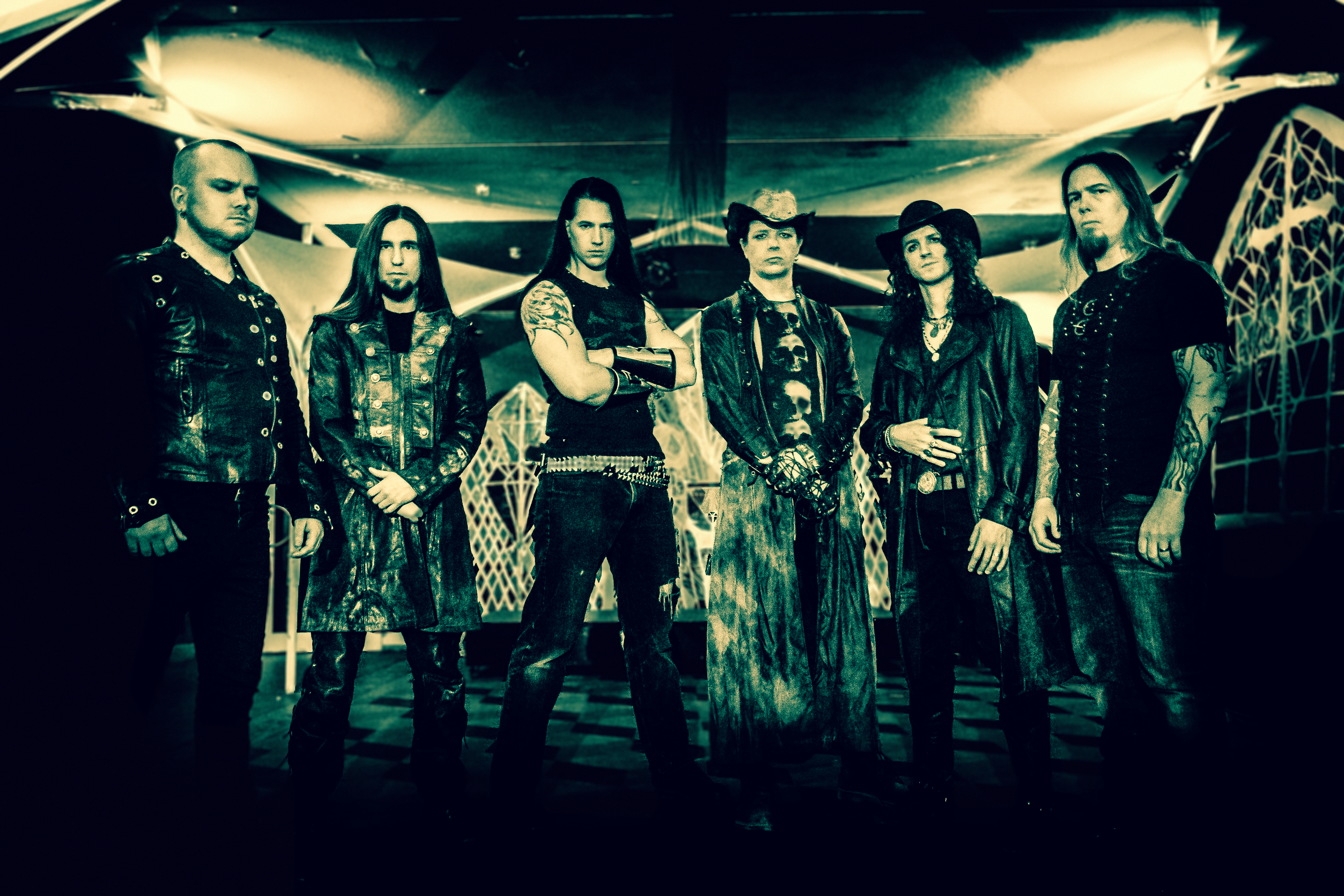
- Netherbird in 2016: Tobias Jakobsson, Johan Nord, Micke André, Nephente, Bizmark, Fredrik Andersson

Background information
- Origin: Stockholm, Sweden
- Genres: Black metal, hard rock
- Years active: 2004–2014, 2016–2023
- Labels: Eisenwald Tonschmiede, Black Lodge, Pulverised, Scarecrow
- Members: Nephente; Bizmark ("PNA"); Johan Nord; Tobias Jakobsson; Micke André; Fredrik Andersson
- Website: netherbird.com

Netherbird was a Swedish metal band from Stockholm. Their signature sound was heavily influenced by the early 1990s Scandinavian black and death metal, as well as elements of doom, gothic and heavy metal present.

== History ==
=== Early years, 2004–2009 ===
The band logo

Netherbird was formed in Stockholm, Sweden in 2004 by lyricist/vocalist Johan "Nephente" Fridell, composer/guitarist Pontus "Bizmark" Andersson and guitarist Torbjörn "Grim" Jacobsson. Their collaboration was already from the formative sessions which focused on writing harsh yet melodic metal to be recorded without any set line-up but instead utilizing session members.

Netherbird's first single, Boulevard Black was followed up by the EPs Blood Orchid and Lighthouse Eternal (Laterna Magika). At this time, they remained strictly as a studio band and distributed their songs freely via the internet resulting in a fast growing following online. Consequently, they landed a record contract with Pulverised Records based in Singapore releasing the debut album The Ghost Collector in 2008.

During this period Grim stepped down from the line-up and drummer Adrian Erlandsson (Paradise Lost, Cradle of Filth, At the Gates) joined as a permanent member. Session members included Brice LeQlerc (Nightrage, Dissection), Janne Saarenpää (The Crown), Daniel "Mojjo" Moilanen (Katatonia, Lord Belial), Jonas "Skinny" Kangur (Deathstars) and Kitty Saric (Decadence).

As a tribute to some of the bands who had influenced Netherbird's song craft Netherbird released the online EP entitled Covered in Darkness in 2009 which include renditions of songs by Paradise Lost, Sentenced and Annihilator.

=== 2010–2014 ===
The second full-length album Monument Black Colossal was released in 2010 and the last recording session with Erlandsson on drums. Netherbird made their first live performance later the same year, now with a full line up featuring Nephente – vocals, Bizmark – guitar/keyboards, Johan Nord – guitar/vocals, Tobias Gustafsson (Eucharist) – bass/vocals and drummer Erik Röjås (Sterbhaus, Ondskapt).

In 2011 Netherbird spurned two EPs entitled Shadows and Snow and Abysmal Allure, revealing a distinctly more analogue and raw soundscape with less keyboards.

Over the years that followed Netherbird made an increasing number of live shows including two tours throughout central and Eastern Europe in 2012–2014 along with a short tour in Russia.

Their third album The Ferocious Tides of Fate was released in 2013. By the end of 2014, the band held a final 10-year celebration concert in Stockholm, Sweden at Kraken and simultaneously announced a hiatus on their live activity.

=== 2016–present ===
After a two-year break, Netherbird returned with a new single/video Windwards followed by the single/lyric video for Pillars of the Sky. The fourth album The Grander Voyage was released by label Black Lodge Records (Sound Pollution) at the end of October 2016. As many of their songs from the early days had only been released digitally and on limited edition CD's, Black Lodge Records released the compilation album Hymns from Realms Yonder in 2017. Around the same time The Ghost Collector was re-issued.

More recently, Netherbird has appeared on festival stages including Norway's Inferno Metal Festival in 2017 and Gamrocken Metal Festival in Sweden 2018.

The 2018 line-up consists of Nephente (vocals), Bizmark (lead guitar), Johan Nord (guitar/vocals), Tobias Jakobsson (lead guitar), Micke André (bass) and Fredrik Andersson (Ex-Amon Amarth; drums).

== Members ==
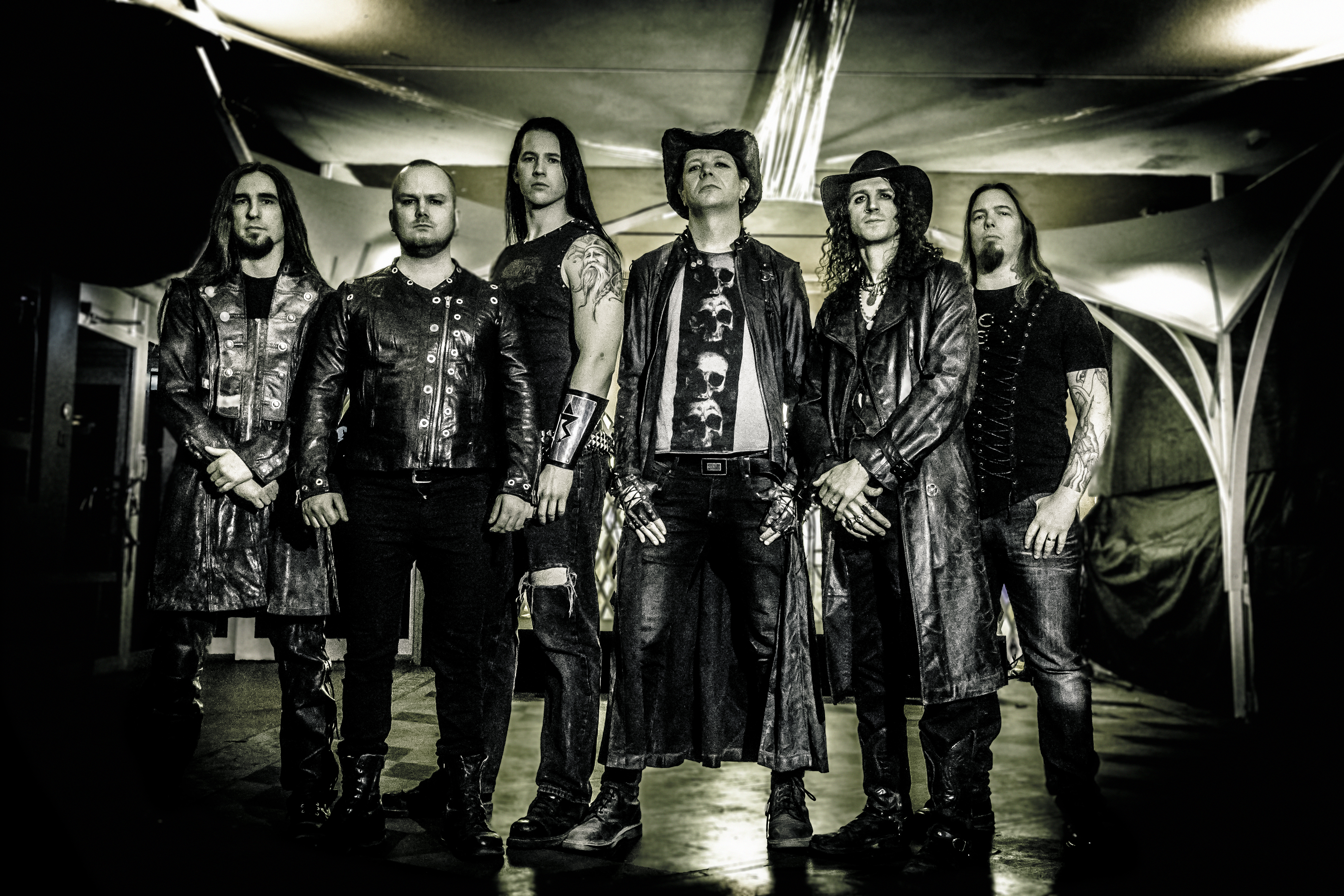
Netherbird in 2016

=== Band members ===
- Nephente (Johan Fridell) – vocals (2004–2014, 2016– )
- Bizmark (Pontus Andersson, a.k.a. "PNA") – guitar, keyboards, vocals (2004–2014, 2016– )
- Tobias Jakobsson – bass (2012–2014), lead guitar (2016– )
- Micke André – bass, vocals (2016– )
- Fredrik Andersson – drums (2016– )

=== Previous members ===
- Grim (Torbjörn Jacobsson) – guitar (2004–2008)
- Adrian Erlandsson – drums (2007–2010)
- Tobias Gustafsson – bass (2009–2012)
- Erik Röjås – drums (2010–2012)
- Nils Fjellström – drums (2012–2014)
- Stark (a.k.a. "Sev") – drums (2014)
- Johan Nord – guitar, vocals (2009–2014, 2016–2020)

=== Session members ===
- Erik Molnar – bass (2011–2012)
- Tinitus (Tobias Jacobsson) – bass (2012)
- Ljusebring (Ibrahim Stråhlman) – drums (2012)
- Robert Bäck – drums (2013)

== Discography ==
=== Albums ===
- Arete (2021)
- Into the Vast Uncharted (2019)
- The Grander Voyage (2016)
- The Ferocious Tides of Fate (2013)
- Monument Black Colossal (2010)
- The Ghost Collector (2008)

=== Collection albums ===
- Hymns from Realms Yonder (2017)

=== EPs ===
- Boulevard Black / Blood Orchid (2012)
- Shadows and Snow (2011)
- Abysmal Allure (2011)
- Covered in Darkness (2009)
- Blood Orchid (2007)
- Lighthouse Eternal (Laterna Magika) (2007)

=== Singles ===
- "Boulevard Black Single" (2006)
- "Elegance and Sin" (2013)
- "Windwards" (2016)
- "Pillars of the Sky" (2016)
- "Saturnine Ancestry " (2019)
- "Lunar Pendulum" (2019)
- "Mercury Skies" (2019)
- "Towers of the Night" (2021)
- "Void Dancer" (2021)
