= Sator (band) =

Swedish rock band

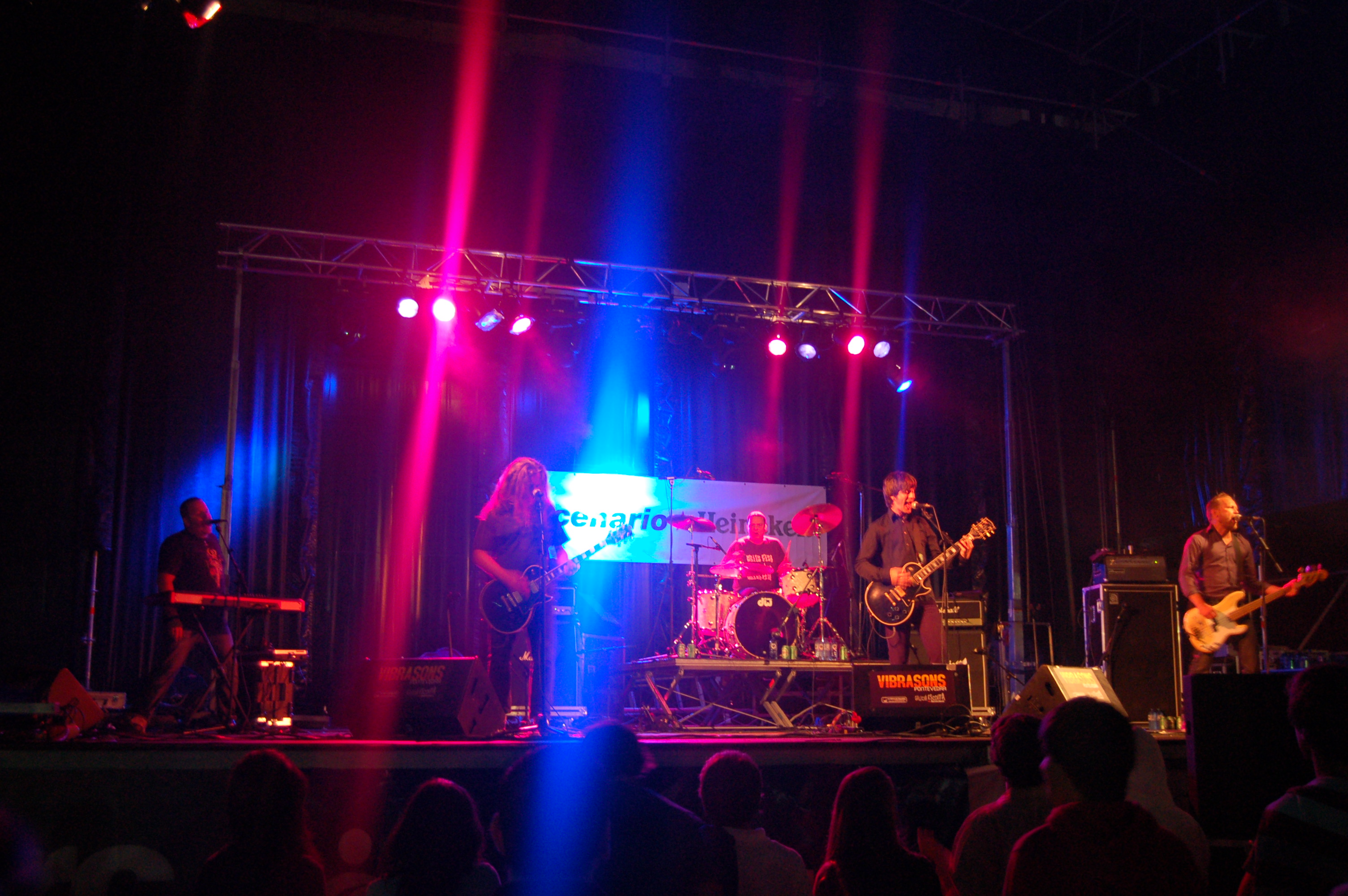
- Sator performing in Pontevedra, Spain, in 2008

Background information
- Also known as: Sator Codex (1981–1987)
- Origin: Borlänge, Sweden
- Genre: Rock
- Years active: 1981–2026
- Members: Kent Norberg; Hans Gäfvert; Chips Kiesbye; Heikki Kiviaho; Michael Solén
- Past members: Björn Clarin
- Website: http://www.sator.se

Sator was a Swedish rock band formed in Borlänge in 1981. Originally known as Sator Codex, the band released one album and three singles before shortening their name in 1987, continuing without their previous lead singer Björn Clarin and changing their sound. Chips Kiesbye is also a successful producer and has worked with The Hellacopters, Sahara Hotnights, Millencolin and several other rock bands.

== Members ==
- Kent Norberg: lead vocals, guitar
- Chips Kiesbye: lead vocals, guitar
- Hans Gäfvert: keyboards, samples
- Heikki Kiviaho: bass, backing vocals
- Michael Solén: drums

== Discography ==
=== Albums ===
- Wanna Start a Fire? (1986) (as Sator Codex)
- Slammer! (1988)
- Stock Rocker Nuts! (1990)
- Headquake (1992)
- Barbie-Q-Killers Vol. 1 (1994)
- Stereo (1995)
- Musical Differences (1998)
- Basement Noise (2006)
- Under the Radar (2011)
- Return of the Barbie-Q-Killers (2022) – No. 14 Sweden

=== Singles ===
- "Howling" (1984) (as Sator Codex)
- "Leech" (1985) (as Sator Codex)
- "Scales to Skin" / "Crusade (Gonna Start a Fire)" (1986) (as Sator Codex)
- "Oh Mama" (1988) – Lili & Susie cover
- "World" (1990)
- "Restless Again" (1990)
- "Hello Hello! (I'm Back Again)" (1990) – Gary Glitter cover
- "We're Right, You're Wrong" (1992)
- "I Wanna Go Home" (1992)
- "Ring Ring" (1993) – ABBA cover
- "I'd Rather Drink Than Talk" (1993)
- "No Solution" (1994) – The Nuns cover
- "I'll Wait" (1994) – The Suicide Commandos cover
- "Nothing Hurts" (1994)
- "Out of the Void" (1995)
- "This Is My Life" (1995) – Gasolin' cover
- "Even as We Speak" (1995)
- "It Really Doesn't Matter Now" (1995)
- "I'm Gone" (1995)
- "Everybody's Making Plans" (1998)
- "Love MF" (1998)
- "TV-Night" (1999)
- "Droppin' Out!" (1999)
- Leksands EP:n (2009)
- "I Wanna Go Home (Twenty-Ten)" (2010)
- "World Keeps Turning" (2013)
- "When You Lie Down with Dogs" (2014)

=== Split single ===
- Sator vs White Flag (1994)
- Sator / Gangbangers (1996)

=== DVDs ===
- Live at Sticky Fingers 2006 (2007)

=== Other recordings ===
- "Ring Ring" – ABBA cover from 1992 Swedish ABBA tribute album "ABBA: The Tribute", released on the Polar Music label
