= Kim Hiorthøy =

Norwegian musician and graphic designer (born 1973)

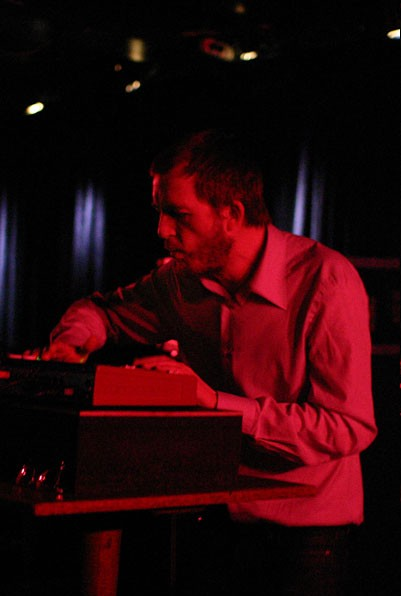
- Born: March 17, 1973 (age 53); Trondheim, Norway
- Education: Trondheim Academy of Fine Art (1991–1996); Royal Danish Academy of Fine Arts (1999–2000); School of Visual Arts (1994)
- Occupations: Musician; graphic designer; illustrator; filmmaker; writer
- Years active: 2000–present

Kim Hiorthøy (born 17 March 1973) is a Norwegian electronic musician, graphic designer, illustrator, filmmaker, and writer.

== Biography ==
Hiorthøy was born and raised in Trondheim, Norway. He studied at the Trondheim Academy of Fine Art from 1991 to 1996 and at the Royal Danish Academy of Fine Arts in Copenhagen in 1999 and 2000. During his tenure at the Trondheim Academy of Fine Art, Hiorthøy spent a year abroad in 1994, attending the School of Visual Arts in New York. There, he worked extensively with cinematographer Mott Hupfel. He lives and works in Berlin, Germany. A fictionalized version of Hiorthøy is a character in Erlend Loe's novel L.

== Career ==
=== Music ===
Hiorthøy began making music while attending the Trondheim Academy of Fine Art; he worked in the academy's sound studio until he left school and purchased his own equipment. After various "collaborations and accidents", his music was eventually introduced to Joakim Haugland of the Smalltown Supersound record label. Haugland asked Hiorthøy to work with the label, and in 2001 Hiorthøy released his debut album, "Hei". He has subsequently released several albums, EPs, and 7-inch records with Smalltown Supersound.

Hiorthøy's musical style is difficult to classify; the Smalltown Supersound website offers the following description: "On his records Kim Hiorthøy combines weird beats, lo-fi/leftfield electronics, field recordings, electro-acoustic sounds and samples, resulting in a sound all his own." His live sets, however, differ from his recordings, with louder, faster beats and a techno undertone.

=== Graphic design and film ===
While exploring music at the Trondheim Academy of Fine Art, Hiorthøy also began working in graphic design. He started publishing fanzines and designing record sleeves for local bands, and over time, he began working more seriously across a variety of creative media. To date, Hiorthøy has released several collections of photography, drawing, and design, and has provided cover artworks for such record labels as Rune Grammofon, Smalltown Supersound, Smalltown Superjazzz, and the rock group Motorpsycho. He is represented by STANDARD, an Oslo-based gallery that promotes contemporary Norwegian artists. Some of his other creative achievements include film directing, film photography, and illustration for children's books.

In a 2004 interview with KultureFlash.com, Hiorthøy described the relationship between graphic design and music: "I regard them as very different things, even though the place in my head that decides if something works or not is the same for both".

== Bibliography ==
- "Tree Weekend", 2000, Die Gestalten Verlag
- "Alt Fins", 2001, self-published
- "Du kan ikke svikte din beste venn og bli god til å synge samtidig", 2002, Oktober
- "Katalog", 2003, Smalltown Superbooks
- "Alt Fins" (Japanese edition), 2006, Afterhours
- "Tago Mago", 2007, Bergen Kunsthall on the occasion of the exhibition

=== Illustrations ===
- Erlend Loe – Fisken, 1994
- Motorpsycho – Timothy's Monster, 1994
- Sissel Lie – Pusegutten en en drittsekk!, 1995
- Erlend Loe – Kurt blir grusom, 1995
- Sissel Lie – Pusegutten og den lille gule, 1996
- Erlend Loe – Den store røde hunden, 1996
- Motorpsycho – Blissard, 1996
- Sissel Lie – Pusegutten er eldst og tykkest, 1997
- Bjørn Sortland – Den solbrente mammaen som blei bytta mot ti kamelar, 1997
- Motorpsycho – Angels and Daemons at Play, 1997
- Erlend Loe – Kurt for alle, 1998
- Erlend Loe – Kurt quo vadis?, 1998
- Lunde, Stein Erik – Eggg, 1998
- Motorpsycho – Trust Us, 1998
- Sissel Lie – Pusegutter tåler nesten alt, 1999
- Tore Renberg – Hando Kjendo : søndag, 1999
- Bjørn Sortland – Den solbrente mammaen som kledde seg naken for å bli kunst, 1999
- Kim Fupz Aakeson – Da gud fikk en hobby, 1999
- Tore Renberg – Hando Kjendo : torsdag, 2000
- Motorpsycho – Let Them Eat Cake, 2000
- Erlend Loe – Kurt 3, 2001
- Motorpsycho – Phanerothyme, 2001
- Motorpsycho – It's a Love Cult, 2002
- Erlend Loe – Kurt koker hodet, 2003
- Jaga Jazzist – What We Must, 2005
- Motorpsycho – Black Hole/Blank Canvas, 2006
- Motorpsycho – Little Lucid Moments, 2008
- Motorpsycho – Child of the Future, 2009
- Motorpsycho – Heavy Metal Fruit, 2010
- Motorpsycho – The Death Defying Unicorn, 2012
- Motorpsycho – Still Life with Eggplant, 2013
- Motorpsycho – Behind the Sun, 2014
- Motorpsycho – Here Be Monsters, 2016

=== Photography ===
- Lindstrøm – Where You Go I Go Too, 2008

== Discography ==
=== Albums ===
- Hei, 2000 (CD), Smalltown Supersound
- Melke (compilation), 2001 (CD), Smalltown Supersound
- For the Ladies, 2004 (CD), Smalltown Supersound
- My Last Day, 2007 (CD), Smalltown Supersound
- Dogs, 2014 (CD, 12"), Smalltown Supersound
- Ghost Note, 2025 (12"), Blickwinkel

=== EPs ===
- Hopeness [EP], 2004 (CD), Smalltown Supersound
- Live Shet [EP], 2004 (CD), Smalltown Supersound

=== Singles ===
- "This Record Can Not Set Me on Fire", 2006 (12"), Smalltown Supersound
- "I'm This, I'm That", 2006 (7"), Smalltown Supersound
