= Kingdom of Oblivion =

Studio album by Motorpsycho
- Released: April 16, 2021
- Genre: Psychedelic rock, progressive rock, alternative rock
- Length: 70:11
- Label: Stickman Records; Rune Grammofon
- Producer: Bent Sæther

Motorpsycho chronology
The All Is One (2020)	Kingdom of Oblivion (2021)	Ancient Astronauts (2022)

Professional ratings
Aggregate scores
Source	Rating
Metacritic	(81/100)
Review scores
Source	Rating
AllMusic	4/5 stars
Sputnikmusic	4/5 stars

Kingdom of Oblivion is a studio album by Norwegian rock band Motorpsycho, released on April 16, 2021, through Stickman Records and Rune Grammofon. The album is available as a double vinyl, CD and digital download.

== Track listing ==
All lyrics are written by Bent Sæther, except "The Watcher" by Ian Kilmister; all music is composed by Sæther, except where noted.

No.	Title	Writer(s)	Length
1.	"The Waning (Pt. 1 & 2)"		7:21
2.	"Kingdom of Oblivion"	Hans Magnus Ryan, Sæther	6:56
3.	"Lady May"	Ryan, Sæther	3:21
4.	"The United Debased"		9:03
5.	"The Watcher" (Hawkwind cover)	Kilmister; featuring "The Crimson Eye" by Tomas Järmyr, Ryan, Sæther	5:03
6.	"Dreamkiller"		5:15
7.	"Atet"		2:16
8.	"At Empire's End"		8:35
9.	"The Hunt"		5:45
10.	"After the Fair"	Ryan, Sæther	1:57
11.	"The Transmutation of Cosmoctopus Lurker"	Järmyr, Ryan, Sæther	10:55
12.	"Cormorant"		3:37
Total length:			70:11

Vinyl version

- Side A: 1–3
- Side B: 4–6
- Side C: 7–9
- Side D: 10–12

== Personnel ==
Per the album liner notes:

Motorpsycho

- Bent Sæther – lead vocals (1, 3–6, 8, 9, 11), vocals (2), bass (1–8, 11–12), acoustic guitar (1, 4, 6–10), electric guitar (1, 6, 12), Mellotron (1–6, 8–12), percussion (3, 6, 9, 12), synthesizer (6), piano (8)
- Hans Magnus Ryan – lead vocals (2), vocals (1, 3, 4, 6, 8, 9, 11), electric guitars (1, 2, 4, 5, 7, 8, 11, 12), acoustic guitars (3, 9, 10), saxomophone (9), drums (12)
- Tomas Järmyr – drums (1, 2, 4, 5, 8, 11), percussion (1, 2, 4, 8, 11), electric piano (2)

Additional musicians

- Reine Fiske – electric guitar (1, 2, 4, 11), acoustic guitar (1)
- Ola Kvernberg – percussion (9)
- Tos Nieuwenhuizen – guitar (cosmic wah) (11)

Technical

- Peter Deimel – engineer
- Etienne Clauzel – assistant engineer
- Andrew Scheps – mixing
- Helge Sten – mastering
- Håvard Gjelseth – cover design, layout
