= Demon Box (album) =

Studio album by Motorpsycho
- Released: February 1993
- Recorded: Dec 1992/Jan 1993
- Genre: Rock
- Length: 71:58 (CD); 89:23 (LP)
- Label: Voices of Wonder; Rune Grammofon
- Producer: Motorpsycho, Deathprod

Motorpsycho chronology
8 Soothing Songs for Rut (1992)	Demon Box (1993)	The Tussler – Original Motion Picture Soundtrack (1994)

Demon Box is the third full-length studio album by Norwegian rock-band Motorpsycho. Released on double vinyl and single CD formats (the original CD-edition omitting the tracks "Mountain", "Gutwrench" and "Mr. Who?") in February 1993, it saw the band earn their name as one of the most important bands in Norway.

== LP track listing ==
All tracks are written by Bent Sæther, except where noted.

Side A
No.	Title	Writer(s)	Length
1.	"Waiting for the One"		2:50
2.	"Nothing to Say"		5:18
3.	"Feedtime"	Håkon Gebhardt, Hans Magnus Ryan, Sæther	5:15
4.	"Gutwrench"	Gebhardt, Ryan, Sæther	4:45
5.	"Sunchild"		4:05

Side B
No.	Title	Writer(s)	Length
1.	"Mountain"	Gebhardt, Lars Lien, Ryan, Helge Sten, Sæther	11:12
2.	"Tuesday Morning"	Ryan, Sæther	4:22
3.	"All Is Loneliness"	Moondog	5:08

Side C
No.	Title	Writer(s)	Length
1.	"Come On In"		2:40
2.	"Step Inside Again"		3:39
3.	"Demon Box"	Gebhardt, Ryan, Sten, Sæther	17:06

Side D
No.	Title	Writer(s)	Length
1.	"Babylon"		2:30
2.	"Mr. Who?"	Gebhardt, Ryan, Sæther	1:46
3.	"Junior"		4:34
4.	"Plan #1"	Ryan, Sæther, Matt Burt	7:39
5.	"Sheer Profoundity"	Gebhardt, Ryan, Sæther	3:37
6.	"The One Who Went Away"		3:13

The first pressing of 500 copies have sides A and D on one record and sides B and C on the other.

== CD track listing ==
1. "Waiting for the One"
2. "Nothing to Say"
3. "Feedtime"
4. "Sunchild"
5. "Tuesday Morning"
6. "All Is Loneliness"
7. "Come On In"
8. "Step Inside Again"
9. "Demon Box"
10. "Babylon"
11. "Junior"
12. "Plan #1"
13. "Sheer Profoundity"
14. "The One Who Went Away"

The tracks "Gutwrench", "Mountain" and "Mr. Who" were omitted from the CD edition in order to fit the album onto one disc.

== 2014 reissue ==
Demon Box was reissued on both vinyl and CD in 2014 on Norwegian label Rune Grammofon. The vinyl edition was issued in a limited transparent vinyl edition, as well as regular, non-limited black vinyl edition. The CD version is a non-limited extended 5-disc issue, containing the original album in its entirety for the first time on CD, including the 1993 "Mountain EP" and the 1994 "Another Ugly EP", as well as outtakes, alternate versions and live tracks. The fifth disc is a video recording of a show at the Vera club in Groningen, the Netherlands on 19 September 1993.

== Personnel ==
- Bent Sæther: vocals, bass, guitars, organ bass, synth bass, percussion, taurus, cymbals, toy piano
- Hans Magnus Ryan: guitars, vocals, sitar, mandolin, flutes, violin, drums, taurus
- Håkon Gebhardt: drums, percussion, guitars, ARP Axxe, vocals

with:

- Lars Lien: piano, hammond organ, mellotron, vocals
- Helge Sten (Deathprod): samples, echomachines, synth bass, taurus, "various machines making lotsa noise"
- Vegard Moen: sitar (on "All is Loneliness")
- Winifried & Arvid Ryan: piano & violin in a vintage recording from 1966 (on "Demon Box")
- Matt Burt: narration (on "Plan #1")
