= Little Lucid Moments =

Studio album by Motorpsycho
- Released: March 28/31, 2008
- Recorded: 2007
- Genre: Psychedelic rock, hard rock
- Length: 59:23
- Label: Stickman Records; Rune Grammofon (Scandinavia, UK, France and USA)
- Producer: Bent Sæther, Deathprod

Motorpsycho chronology
Black Hole/Blank Canvas (2006)	Little Lucid Moments (2008)	Child of the Future (2009)

Little Lucid Moments is the twelfth full-length studio album by the Norwegian band Motorpsycho that was released on March 31, 2008, by Rune Grammofon Records in Scandinavia, the UK, the United States and France and on March 28, 2008, by Stickman Records in Germany and the rest of Europe. It is available on CD and double vinyl. The four songs featured on the album are extremely long, each between 11 and 21 minutes.

This was the first album recorded with new drummer Kenneth Kapstad. It was once again co-produced by long-time collaborateur Helge Sten a.k.a. Deathprod.

As with most Motorpsycho albums, the cover art was created by Kim Hiorthøy.

== Track listing ==
No.	Title	Writer(s)	Length
1.	"Suite: Little Lucid Moments" i. "Lawned (Consciousness Causes Collapse)" ii. "A Hoof to the Head" iii. "Hallucifuge (Hyperrealistically Speaking...)" iv. "Sweet Oblivion / Perfect Sense"	Bent Sæther; Hans Magnus Ryan, Sæther; Kenneth Kapstad, Ryan, Sæther; Ryan, Sæther	21:05; 6:10; 4:19; 9:18; 1:14
2.	"Year Zero (a damage report)"	Ryan	11:26
3.	"She Left on the Sun Ship" (featuring confusion is kjeks & (I think) I feel better now...)	Kapstad, Ryan, Sæther	14:25
4.	"The Alchemyst" (a discourse on transmutation, pennies dropping & the luminiferous aether)	Sæther	12:27

== Personnel ==
- Bent Sæther: vocals, bass guitar, guitars, keyboards etc.
- Hans Magnus Ryan: guitars, vocals, keyboards etc.
- Kenneth Kapstad: drums
