= The Gaia II Space Corps =

Studio album by Motorpsycho
- Released: 27 February 2026
- Studios: Amper Studio, Ye Olde Cheese Factory
- Genres: Psychedelic rock, hard rock
- Length: 36:21
- Label: Det Nordenfjeldske Grammofonselskab
- Producers: Motorpsycho, Deathprod, Bent Sæther

Motorpsycho chronology
| Ahsol Caravan (2025) | The Gaia II Space Corps (2026) |

Professional ratings
Aggregate scores
| Source | Rating |
|---|---|
| Metacritic | 70/100 |
Review scores
| Source | Rating |
| AllMusic | 3.5/5 stars |
| Sputnikmusic | 3.8/5 |
| Ondarock | 6.5/10 |

The Gaia II Space Corps is a studio album by Norwegian rock band Motorpsycho, released on 27 February 2026, through Det Nordenfjeldske Grammofonselskab. The album is available in CD, vinyl and digital download formats.

== Musical style ==
On this album, their shortest as of yet, Motorpsycho has a much more concise guitar sound than the latest years, that tended to progrock. For this album they found their inspiration in the psychedelic garage rock of the late sixties and the blues rock and early metal of the early seventies like Blue Cheer and Black Sabbath.

== Reception ==
Sputnikmusic gave the album a 3.8 ("excellent") rating, saying: "It is essentially a love letter to the heavy rock era that influenced them and unsurprisingly, they nailed it", while Prog Archives gave it an aggregated 3.78 ("excellent addition to any prog rock music collection") score, the expert review saying "not really a necessary listen, but for what it is, it's a release that can bring a good time. And sometimes that's kinda all you need for music."

According to Echoes & Dust, "(it) situates you in some glorious world of day glo psych and rattling garage rock. It’s almost perfect in every way."

== Track listing ==
| No. | Title | Length |
|---|---|---|
| 1. | "Fanny Again, Or" | 3:19 |
| 2. | "The Great Stash Robbery" | 6:16 |
| 3. | "TSMcR" | 4:48 |
| 4. | "The Hornet" | 4:13 |
| 5. | "The Gaia ll Space Corps" | 4:44 |
| 6. | "The Oracle" | 7:07 |
| 7. | "Black As Night" | 5:54 |
| Total length: | | 36:21 |

All songs credited to "Motorpsychodelic Tunes", except #7, copyright The Frost. All songs arranged by Bent Sæther, Hans Magnus Ryan, Reine Fiske and Olaf Olsen.

== Personnel ==
The band has presented itself as a duo since the loss of their drummer, but as always has assistance from longtime collaborators, in this case guitarist Reine Fiske, drummer Olaf Olsen and producer Deathprod.

Motorpsycho

- Bent Sæther – lead guitar, lead vocals, background vocals, electric sitar, acoustic rhythm guitar, electric rhythm guitar, bass, drums, percussion, synthesizer, effects, mellotron
- Hans Magnus Ryan – acoustic guitar, bass, percussion, lead vocals, background vocals, organ, hornet guitar, electric lead guitar, electric sitar, slide guitar, gong

with

- Reine Fiske - lead guitar, rhythm guitar, electric lead guitar, vocal treatments
- Olaf Olsen - drums
