= Here Be Monsters (Motorpsycho album) =

Studio album by Motorpsycho
- Released: 12 February 2016
- Recorded: February – October 2015
- Genre: Psychedelic rock, progressive rock, alternative rock
- Length: 46:16
- Label: Stickman Records; Rune Grammofon
- Producer: Bent Sæther

Motorpsycho chronology
Behind the Sun (2014)	Here Be Monsters (2016)	The Tower (2017)

Professional ratings
Aggregate scores
Source	Rating
Metacritic	(83/100)
Review scores
Source	Rating
AllMusic	4.5/5 stars
Sputnikmusic	4/5 stars

Here Be Monsters is a studio album by Norwegian rock band Motorpsycho, released on 12 February, 2016, through Stickman Records and Rune Grammofon. The album is available as a vinyl, CD and a digital download.

== Track listing ==
All tracks are written by Bent Sæther, except where noted.

No.	Title	Writer(s)	Length
1.	"Sleepwalking"		0:57
2.	"Lacuna / Sunrise"		9:47
3.	"Running With Scissors"	Hans Magnus Ryan	5:39
4.	"I.M.S."		7:05
5.	"Spin, Spin, Spin" (cover of H.P Lovecraft song)	Terry Callier	4:08
6.	"Sleepwalking Again"		0:57
7.	"Big Black Dog"	Ryan, Sæther	17:43
Total length:			46:16

== Personnel ==
Motorpsycho

- Bent Sæther – bass, vocals, guitars, producer, engineer
- Hans Magnus Ryan – guitars, vocals; flute (track 3)
- Kenneth Kapstad – drums

With

- Thomas Henriksen – keyboards, vocals, engineer, mixing
