= Hans Magnus Ryan =

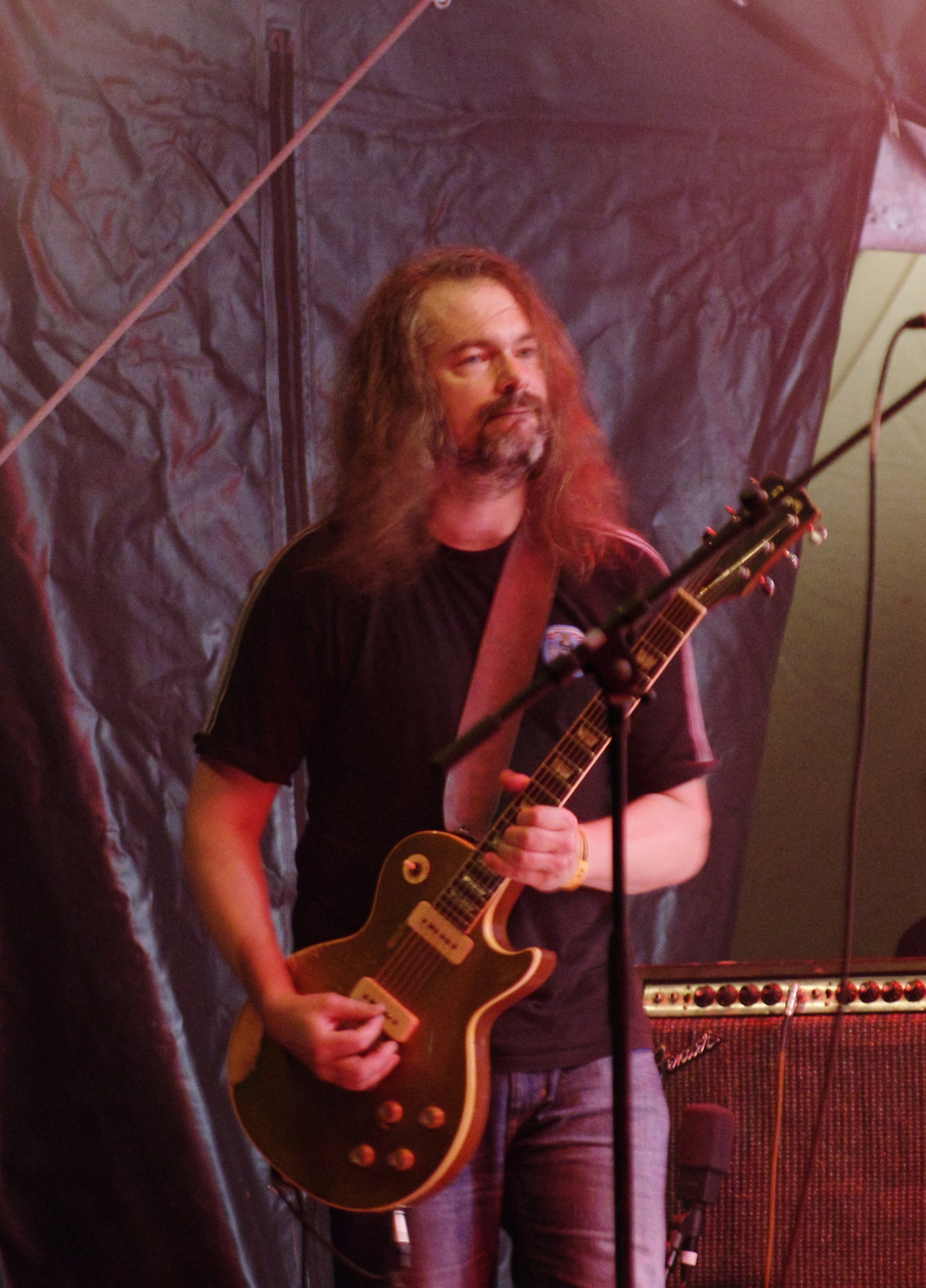
- Ryan "Snah" with Motorpsycho live at Krach Am Bach 2013.

Background information
- Also known as: "Snah"
- Born: 31 December 1969 (age 56); Trondheim, Sør-Trøndelag
- Origin: Norway
- Genres: Rock
- Occupations: Musician, composer
- Instruments: Guitar, vocals

Hans Magnus Ryan, alias "Snah", (born 31 December 1969 in Trondheim, Norway) is a Norwegian rock musician (guitar & vocals), known as front figure of the band Motorpsycho.

== Career ==
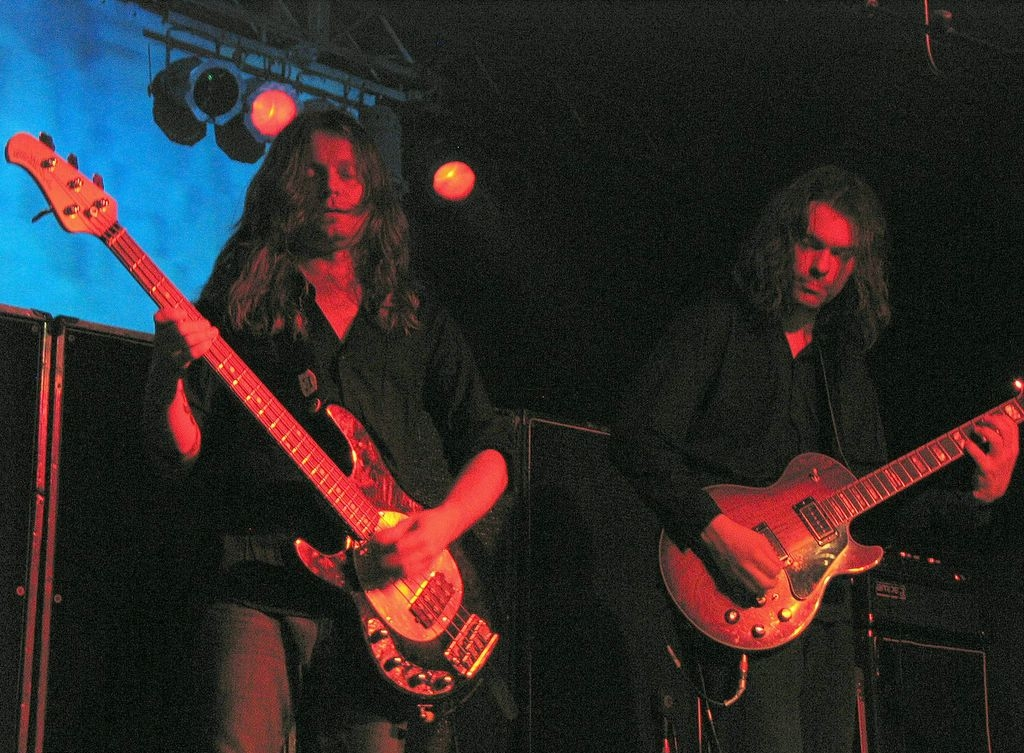
Sæther and Ryan with Motorpsycho.

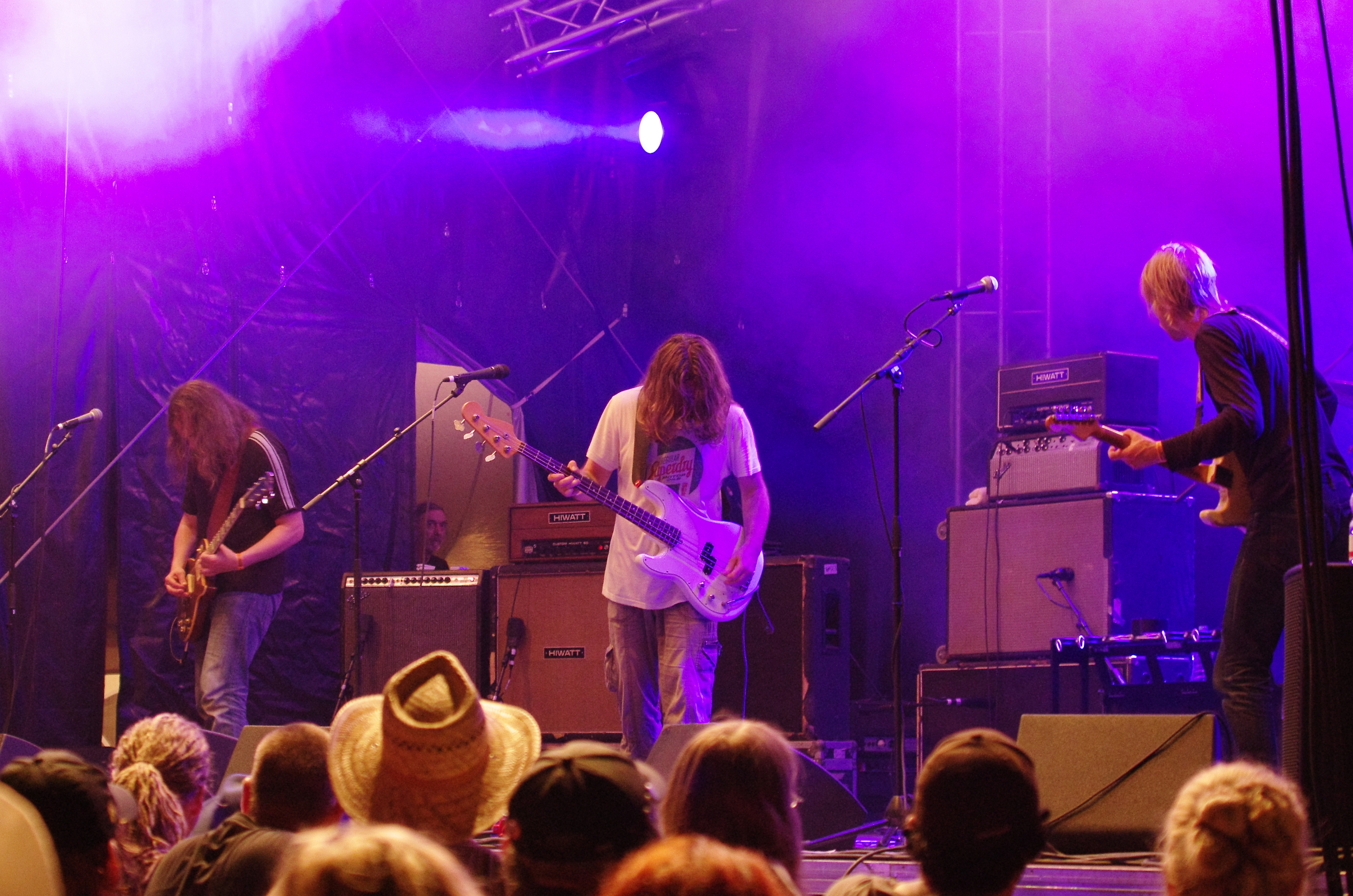
Ryan, Bent Sæther and Reine Fiske with Motorpsycho live at Krach Am Bach 2013.

In 1989 Ryan and bassist Bent Sæther together with drummer Kjell Runar "Killer" Jenssen, formed Motorpsycho as an alternative metal band that very soon developed into a unique blend of heavy metal, grunge and indie rock, as well as exploring the sonic noise experiments that is associated with the Associate Member Deathprod. After the debut album Lobotomizer (1991) was Håkon Gebhardt (b. 1969), new drummer. The ambitious, progressive album Demon Box (1993) gave the band a nomination for the Spellemannprisen, and secured Motorpsycho a loyal group of followers in Germany, Belgium and the Netherlands as well as in Scandinavia. Kenneth Kapstad replaced drummer Håkon Gebhardt in 2007. Ryan also plays the guitar in the band The International Tussler Society.

== Style ==
As a guitarist Ryan is primarily self-taught, save for a one-year study at the Trøndertun folk high school's line of rock. During his tenure as a core member of Motorpsycho he has delved into a wide array of rock related genres in connection with the band's trademark quest for development. Genres explored include heavy metal, classic hard rock, indie rock, shoegaze, ambient, chamber pop, jazz, psychedelia and country. Likewise his comprehensive ingenuity both as instrumentalist and composer is an integral part of the different soundscapes chiseled out in the trio's relatively vast output since 1991. Ryan's instrumental work both live and in studio is heavily based on improvisation, a discipline refined through years of rehearsals and touring. As such, epic solos are found throughout Motorpsycho's discography and can be exemplified by titles such as "Mountain" (1993) and "Starhammer" (Heavy Metal Fruit, 2010). Ryan's live improvisational abilities are prominently featured in the band's "Roadworks" series, documenting in concert highlights from Motorpsycho's touring history.

== Honors ==
- Spellemannprisen 1996 in the class Rock, within Motorpsycho for the album Blissard
- Spellemannprisen 1997 in the class Hardrock, within Motorpsycho for the album Angels and Daemons at Play
- Spellemannprisen 2000 in the class Rock, within Motorpsycho for the album Let Them Eat Cake
- Edvard Prize 2010 for the album Child of the Future

== Discography ==
=== Albums ===
- 1991: Lobotomizer (Voices of Wonder Records)
- 1992: 8 Soothing Songs for Rut (Voices of Wonder Records)
- 1993: Demon Box (Voices of Wonder Records)
- 1994: Timothy's Monster (Stickman Records)
- 1994: The Tussler (dBut)
- 1995: Blissard (Stickman Records)
- 1997: Angels and Daemons at Play (Stickman Records)
- 1998: Trust Us (Stickman Records)
- 2000: Let Them Eat Cake (Columbia)
- 2001: Phanerothyme (Columbia)
- 2002: It's a Love Cult (Stickman Records)
- 2006: Black Hole/Blank Canvas (Stickman Records)
- 2008: Little Lucid Moments (Rune Grammofon)
- 2009: Child of the Future (Rune Grammofon)
- 2010: Heavy Metal Fruit (Rune Grammofon)
- 2013: Still Life with Eggplant (Rune Grammofon)
- 2014: Behind the Sun (Rune Grammofon)
- 2016: Here Be Monsters (Rune Grammofon)
- 2017: The Tower (Rune Grammofon)
- 2019: The Crucible (Rune Grammofon)
- 2020: The All Is One (Rune Grammofon)
- 2021: Kingdom of Oblivion (Rune Grammofon)
- 2022: Ancient Astronauts (Rune Grammofon)
- 2023: Yay! (Rune Grammofon)
- 2024: Neigh!! (Rune Grammofon)

=== As Motorpsycho and Friends ===
- 1994: The Tussler - Original Motion Picture Soundtrack

=== As Motorpsycho and Ståle Storløkken ===
- 2012:The Death Defying Unicorn

=== As The International Tussler Society ===
- 2004: Motorpsycho presents The International Tussler Society
- 2004: Satans Favourite Son (Promo-single)
- 2004: Laila Lou (Promo-single)

=== Live albums (Roadworks) ===
- 1999: Roadwork Vol. 1: Heavy Metall Iz A Poze, Hardt Rock Iz A Laifschteil (Stickman Records), live in Europe 1998
- 2000: Roadwork Vol. 2: The Motor Source Massacre (Stickman Records), with The Source & Deathprod live at Kongsberg Jazzfestival 1995
- 2008: Roadwork Vol. 3: The Four Norsemen of the Apocalypse (included in the double DVD release "Haircuts")
- 2011: Roadwork Vol. 4 – Intrepid Skronk
- 2011: Strings of Stroop – Motorpsycho Live at Effenaar (limited edition vinyl)
- 2018: Roadwork Vol. 5: Field Notes - The Fantastic Expedition of Järmyr, Ryan, Sæther & Lo (Rune Grammofon), live in Europe 2017

=== Collaborations ===
- 1993: Into The Sun (Split 7"/CD-single with Hedge Hog)
- 2001: Go To California (Split-EP with The Soundtrack of Our Lives)
- 2003: In the Fishtank 10 (Mini-album with Jaga Jazzist Horns)
- 2010: Children of e.l.b. - co-producer (Double CD album with Soup)
