= The Crucible (Motorpsycho album) =

Studio album by Motorpsycho
- Released: February 15, 2019
- Recorded: 2018
- Studio: Monnow Valley Studios
- Genre: Psychedelic rock, progressive rock, alternative rock
- Length: 40:29
- Label: Stickman Records; Rune Grammofon
- Producer: Andrew Scheps, Deathprod

Motorpsycho chronology
The Tower (2017)	The Crucible (2019)	The All Is One (2020)

Professional ratings
Aggregate scores
Source	Rating
Metacritic	(84/100)
Review scores
Source	Rating
AllMusic	4/5 stars
Sputnikmusic	4/5 stars

The Crucible is a studio album by Norwegian rock band Motorpsycho, released on February 15, 2019, through Stickman Records and Rune Grammofon. This is the second installment in the band's Gullvåg Trilogy with the first installment being 2017's The Tower and the third installment being 2020's The All Is One. The album is available as vinyl, CD and a digital download. Side A of the vinyl features the first two tracks 'Psychotzar' and 'Lux Aeterna' while Side B of the vinyl features the final titular track, which spans 20 minutes in length.

== Track listing ==
No.	Title	Writer(s)	Length
1.	"Psychotzar"	Bent Sæther	8:43
2.	"Lux Aeterna"	Sæther	10:55
3.	"The Crucible"	Hans Magnus Ryan, Sæther	20:51
Total length:			40:29

Note: All songs arranged by Järmyr, Ryan and Sæther. All lyrics by Sæther.

== Personnel ==
Motorpsycho

- Bent Sæther – bass, vocals, guitar, Mellotron
- Hans Magnus Ryan – guitar, vocals, piano
- Tomas Järmyr – drums, percussion, vocals, Mellotron

Additional musicians

- Lars Horntveth – reeds (2)
- Susanna Wallumrød – vocals (2)
