= 2026 in Norwegian music =

The following is a list of events and releases that have happened or are expected to happen in 2026 in music in Norway.

== Past Events ==
=== January ===
- 8 – The All Ears festival started in Oslo (January 8 - 11).
- 22 – The Djangofestival started on Cosmopolite, Oslo (January 22 - 24).
- 29 – Nordlystfestivalen started in Tromsø (January 29 - February 7). Elisabeth Misvær won the Nordlysprisen award.

=== February ===
- 28 – Jonas Lovv won Melodi Grand Prix with the song "Ya Ya Ya" and is the Norwegian representative in the Eurovision Song Contest 2026.

=== March ===
- 13 – The 70th Narvik Winter Festival started in Narvik (March 13 - 22).
- 21 – Nordic Eurovision Party 2026 was hosted at Rockefeller music hall in Oslo.
- 22 – The 2025 Spellemannprisen awards proceeded with Mari Kvien Brunvoll as the recipient.
- 27 – The 43rd annual Rock Mot Rus was hosted in Andenes. Thrash metal band Deprived won the competition. (March 27 - 28).

=== April ===
- 2 – The Inferno Metal Festival started in Oslo (April 2 - 5).
- 18 – The Emergenza Festival Oslo semifinals took place at Rockefeller in Oslo.

=== May ===
- 5 – The Maijazz festival starts in Stavanger (May 5 - 10).
- 8 – Deserfest Oslo started at Rockefeller in Oslo (May 8 - 9).
- 16 – Norway placed 14th in the Eurovision Song Contest.
- 22 – The Emergenza Festival Oslo finals took place.
- 29 – The Nattjazz festival started in Bergen (May 29 - June 6).

=== June ===
- 5 – NEON Festival started in Trondheim (June 5 - 6).
- 12 – The Sommerbris festival started in Odderøya, Kristiansand (June 12 - 13).
- 17 – The OverOslo festival started in Oslo (June 17 - 20).
- 24 – The 10th annual Tons of Rock festival started at Ekebergsletta, Oslo (June 24 - 27).

=== July ===
- 8 – The annual Træna Music Festival started in Træna (July 8 - 11).
- 13 – The annual Moldejazz started in Molde (July 13 - 18).

=== August ===
- 12 – The 9th annual Midgardsblot Festival started in Borre (August 12 - 15).

== List of albums released ==
=== January ===
Day	Album	Artist	Label	Note	Ref
23	Sorgenfri Inn	Beathoven	Warner Music Norway		
30	Always and Never the Same	Benedicte Maurseth & Ensemble neoN	Aurora Records		

=== February ===
Day	Album	Artist	Label	Note	Ref
6	Liturgy of Death	Mayhem	Century Media		
27	The Gaia II Space Corps	Motorpsycho	Det Nordenfjeldske Grammofonselskab		

=== March ===
Day	Album	Artist	Label	Note	Ref
6	The Skies Turn Black	Vreid	Indie Recordings		

=== April ===
Day	Album	Artist	Label	Note	Ref
3	A Dark Poem, Pt. II: Sanguis	Green Carnation	Season of Mist		
17	Here Be Draken	Draken	Dark Essence Records		
24	Vox Occulta	Einar Solberg	Inside Out Music		

=== May ===
Day	Album	Artist	Label	Note	Ref
8	Pre-Historic Metal	Darkthrone	Peaceville		
15	Heimakjær	Tobias Sten	Universal Music Group		
22	Grand Serpent Rising	Dimmu Borgir	Nuclear Blast		

=== June ===
Day	Album	Artist	Label	Note	Ref
12	Spring Flood	Mariam Wallentin & Vestnorsk Jazzensemble	Hubro Records		

=== July ===
Day	Album	Artist	Label	Note	Ref
3	Mørketid	Mortem	Peaceville		

== Deaths ==
=== February ===
- 7 – Kåre Grøttum, jazz pianist and composer (born 1934).
- 28 – Amina Sewali, singer and actress (born 1989).

=== April ===
- 15 – Pete Knutsen, musician and composer (born 1947).
