= It's a Love Cult =

Studio album by Motorpsycho
- Released: September 30, 2002
- Recorded: 2001/2002
- Genre: Psychedelic
- Length: 50:09
- Label: Stickman Records
- Producer: Motorpsycho, Deathprod

Motorpsycho chronology
Phanerothyme (2001)	It's a Love Cult (2002)	In the Fishtank 10 (2003)

Professional ratings
Review scores
Source	Rating
Allmusic	4/5 stars

It's a Love Cult is the tenth full-length studio album by the Norwegian band Motorpsycho. The album was preceded by the EP release of "Serpentine", for which also a video was made.

The sleeve was designed by Kim Hiorthøy.

== Track listing ==
All tracks are written by Bent Sæther, except where noted.

No.	Title	Writer(s)	Length
1.	"Überwagner or a Billion Bubbles in My Mind"		5:36
2.	"Circles"		3:59
3.	"Neverland"	Hans Magnus Ryan, Sæther	4:01
4.	"This Otherness"		6:30
5.	"Carousel"	Ryan, Sæther	7:16
6.	"What if..."	Håkon Gebhardt	4:15
7.	"The Mirror and the Lie"		6:43
8.	"Serpentine"	Ryan	5:15
9.	"Custer's Last Stand (One More Daemon)"		4:06
10.	"Composite Head"	Ryan, Sæther	2:25

== Personnel ==
Individual song credits per Motorpsycho's web site.

Motorpsycho

- Bent Sæther: lead vocals (1–5, 7, 9, 10), bass guitar (1–5, 7–10), electric guitar (1, 7, 9, 10), acoustic guitar (2, 5, 7), Mellotron (1, 3, 9), piano (4), viscount organ (4, 6), harmonium (7), glockenspiel (1), tambourine (1, 6, 9), percussion (4, 5), drums (7), guiro (9), vibra slap (9), hand claps (9), backing vocals (1, 3, 6–8)
- Hans Magnus Ryan: lead vocals (3, 8), lead guitar (1, 9, 10), rhythm guitar (1, 9), electric guitar (2–6, 8), 12-string acoustic guitar (3, 10), lapsteel guitar (5), slide guitar (6), acoustic guitar (8, 10), viscount organ (1), Mellotron (1, 6, 9), harmonium (2), ARP synthesizer (2, 9), Elektron SidStation synthesizer (2, 8, 9), piano (7), Fender Rhodes electric piano (7), percussion (4), backing vocals (1, 2, 4–6, 8, 10)
- Håkon Gebhardt: lead vocals (6), drums (all), percussion (4, 5), acoustic guitars (6), horn/reed arrangement (6), lapsteel guitar (7), banjo (7), zither (7), maracas (9), tambourine (10)

with

- Baard Slagsvold: backing vocals (2, 4, 5), Mellotron (2, 5), clavinet (2), Hammond organ (3), orchestral arrangement (5, 7), piano (8)
- Helge Sten (Deathprod): Audio virus, filters; theremin (3), percussion (4), Echoplex (7)

Strings

- Øyvind Fossheim, Vegard Johnsen, André Orvik, Hans Morten Stensland: violins (1, 5, 7)
- Jon W. Sønstebø: viola (1, 5, 7)
- Anne Britt Søvig Årdal: cello (1, 5, 7)

Horns and reeds

- Ketil Vestrum Einarsen: flute (1, 5, 7)
- Anne-Grethe Orvik: oboe (5, 7)
- Lars Horntveth: saxophones (6), horn/reed arrangement (6)
- Øyvind Brække: trombone (6)
- Mathias Eick: trumpet (6)
