= Phanerothyme =

Studio album by Motorpsycho
- Released: September 3, 2001
- Recorded: 2000, 2001
- Genre: Psychedelic pop
- Length: 43:38
- Label: Stickman Records
- Producer: Motorpsycho, Deathprod

Motorpsycho chronology
Let Them Eat Cake (2000)	Phanerothyme (2001)	It's a Love Cult (2002)

Professional ratings
Review scores
Source	Rating
The Independent	4/5 stars

Phanerothyme is the ninth full-length studio album by the Norwegian band Motorpsycho. It was released through Stickman Records (Europe) and Sony (Norway). It was also released in Japan through P-Vine.

== Track listing ==
No.	Title	Writer(s)	Length
1.	"Bedroom Eyes"	Bent Sæther	2:18
2.	"For Free"	Sæther	5:13
3.	"B.S."	Sæther	3:41
4.	"Landslide"	Hans Magnus Ryan, Sæther	4:38
5.	"Go to California"	Ryan, Sæther	8:00
6.	"Painting The Night Unreal"	Sæther	6:35
7.	"The Slow Phaseout"	Ryan, Sæther	4:30
8.	"Blindfolded"	Ryan	3:44
9.	"When You're Dead"	Håkon Gebhardt	4:52

== Vinyl version ==
Due to space limitations, the track list was altered for the LP release.

=== Side A ===
1. Bedroom Eyes
2. For Free
3. B.S.
4. Landslide
5. The Slow Phaseout

=== Side B ===
1. Go To California
2. Painting the Night Unreal
3. Blindfolded
4. When You're Dead

== Personnel ==
- Bent Sæther: vocals, bass, guitars, mellotron, guitarmando, percussion, viscount organ, drums
- Hans Magnus Ryan: guitars, vocals, piano, viscount organ, mellotron, bass
- Håkon Gebhardt: drums, vocals, percussion, guitars, zither, banjo, lap-steel guitar
- Helge Sten (Deathprod): audio virus, filters, ringmodulators, echoplex, theremin
- Baard Slagsvold: piano, Wurlitzer, clavinette, Rhodes piano, backing vocals. Slagsvold did all the string/reed-arrangements, except for "When You're Dead," which was arranged by Lars Horntveth.
- Øyvind Fossheim: violin
- Vegard Johnsen: violin
- André Orvik: violin
- Hans Morten Stensland: violin
- Jon W. Sønstebø: viola
- Anne Britt Søvig Årdal: cello
- Ketil Vestrum Einarsen: flute
- Lars Horntveth: tenor sax and bass-clarinet
- Anne-Grethe Orvik: oboe
- Even Skatrud Andersen: trombone
- Mathias Eick: trumpet and flugelhorn
- Line Horntveth: tuba
- Kim Hiorthøy: cover artwork

== Videos ==
The band made videos for "The Slow Phaseout" and "Go To California", the latter showing them as Amish people walking, running and jumping through the Norwegian woods, whilst carrying surfboards around.

== Singles ==
There were no single/EP releases for this album, but some of the additional songs recorded during the Phanerothyme sessions surfaced on the "Serpentine" EP (2002). Also an EP named "Barracuda" was released in February 2001, containing left over songs from the Let Them Eat Cake-sessions. Still, promotional only singles of "The Slow Phaseout" and "Go To California" (edited version, 2:53 mins) were pressed and sent to radio stations.
