= Timothy's Monster =

Studio album by Motorpsycho
- Released: 6 August 1994
- Recorded: Winter & spring 1994
- Genre: Rock
- Length: 96:49
- Label: Stickman (Europe); Harvest/EMI (Norway)
- Producer: Motorpsycho, Deathprod

Motorpsycho chronology
The Tussler – Original Motion Picture Soundtrack (1994)	Timothy's Monster (1994)	Blissard (1996)

Alternative Cover
- The sleeve of the CD version features two front pages.

Professional ratings
Review scores
Source	Rating
Mojo	4/5 stars
Record Collector	4/5 stars

Timothy's Monster is the fourth full-length studio album by Motorpsycho. It was released through EMI in Norway, marking their first album on a major label, and through the independent label Stickman Records in the rest of the world. The album was issued as a double-CD or triple-LP.

A 4-CD version was released by Rune Grammofon and Stickman Records to tie in with Motorpsycho's appearance at the 2010 Øyafestivalen on August 14, 2010, where the band played the album in its entirety (albeit in a different running order).

== Track listing ==
Disc one
No.	Title	Writer(s)	Length
1.	"Feel"	Bent Sæther	3:26
2.	"Trapdoor"	Sæther	4:22
3.	"Leave It Like That"	Sæther	3:33
4.	"A Shrug & a Fistful"	Sæther, Lars Lien	3:14
5.	"Kill Some Day"	Sæther, Hans Magnus Ryan, Helge Sten	6:53
6.	"On My Pillow"	Ryan	7:21
7.	"Beautiful Sister"	Sæther, Lien	4:11
8.	"Wearing Yr Smell"	Sæther	3:35
9.	"Now It's Time to Skate"	Sæther	4:58
10.	"Giftland"	Ryan, Sæther	10:20
11.	"Watersound"	Sæther	5:11
Total length:			57:09

Disc two
No.	Title	Writer(s)	Length
1.	"The Wheel"	Ryan, Sæther, Håkon Gebhardt, Lien	16:57
2.	"Sungravy"	Sæther	4:36
3.	"Grindstone"	Sæther, Sten	7:17
4.	"The Golden Core"	Ryan, Sæther	12:59
Total length:			41:51

Vinyl

- Side A: 1–5 to 1–5
- Side B: 1–6 to 1–9
- Side C: 1–10 to 1–11
- Side D: 2–1 to 2–2
- Side E: 2–3 to 2–4
- Side F: etching (no music)

== Single-CD version ==
It has also been released as a one-CD edition, aimed at the UK and United States markets, with edited versions of some songs.

1. "Feel" – 3:31
2. "Trapdoor" – 4:21
3. "Leave It Like That" – 2:34
4. "A Shrug & A Fistful" – 3:14
5. "Kill Some Day" – 6:51
6. "The Wheel" – 8:48
7. "Watersound" – 5:10
8. "On My Pillow" – 5:43
9. "Wearing Yr Smell" – 3:36
10. "Now It's Time to Skate" – 4:55
11. "Grindstone" – 7:16
12. "The Golden Core" – 13:00

== 4 CD re-issue version 2010 ==
- CD 1 & 2: The original double-CD version
- CD 3: 1CD pre-version with different songs
- CD 4: Rarities, B-sides, outtakes, covers

Released on Rune Grammofon August 9, 2010

Disc 3 track list:

1. "Leave It Like That" (Sæther)
2. "A Shrug & A Fistful" (Sæther/Lien)
3. "Very 90's, Very Aware" (previously unreleased) (Sæther)
4. "On The Toad Again" (previously only available on the "Dynamo-Open Air 10th Anniversary" compilation, 1995) (Sæther)
5. "Now It's Time To Skate" (Sæther)
6. "Watersound" (Sæther)
7. "Innersfree" (previously unreleased) (Ryan/Sæther)
8. "Giftland" (Ryan/Sæther)
9. "Trapdoor" (Sæther)
10. "Kill Some Day" (Sæther/Ryan/Sten)
11. "Sungravy" (Sæther)
12. "Grindstone" (Sæther/Sten)
13. "The Golden Core" (Ryan/Sæther)

Disc 4 track list:

1. "President Block" (Epinastic Movements cover) (Stenøien)
2. "Jr" (Sæther)
3. "Birds" (Rühle/Sæther)
4. "Leave It Like That" (edit) (Sæther)
5. "On My Pillow" (edit) (Ryan)
6. "The Wheel" (edit) (Ryan/Sæther/Gebhardt/Lien)
7. "New Day Rising" (Husker Dü cover) (Hart/Mould/Norton)
8. "Seethe" (Sæther)
9. "Shock Me" (Kiss cover) (Frehley)
10. "Workin' For MCA" (Lynyrd Skynyrd cover) (King/Van Zant)
11. "Space Cadet Boogie" (Gebhardt/Lien/Ryan/Sæther)
12. "Walking On The Water" (alternative version) (Sæther)
13. "Mr. Buttercut Goes To The Fair, Meets The Viscount, And That's Where We Leave Him At The End Of This Episode..." (Ryan)
14. "Celestine" (Ryan/Sæther)
15. "Sinking" (Sæther)
16. "The Entertaining Ape" (Sæther)
17. "Giftland Jam" (Ryan/Sæther)
18. "Sonnyboy Gaybar" (original version) (Gebhardt/Lien/Ryan/Sæther)
- Tracks 1–4 originally from the "Psychobabble EP" 1994
- Tracks 4–6 originally from the US/UK 1CD Version of Timothy's Monster
- Track 7 originally from Case Closed? : An International Compilation Of Hüsker Dü Cover-songs, 1994
- Track 8 originally from The Return of Jesus Part II soundtrack, 1997
- Track 9 originally from Flaming Youth, 1994
- Track 10 originally from Promotor 1, 1994
- Track 11 originally from Party Terror II compilation, 1994
- Track 14 originally from "Hey Jane EP" 1998
- Tracks 12–13, 15–18 are previously unreleased.

== Personnel ==
- Bent Sæther: vocals, bass, guitars, mellotron, drums, percussion, piano, sitar, synth bass
- Hans Magnus Ryan: guitars, vocals, piano, percussion
- Håkon Gebhardt: drums, banjo, percussion
- Lars Lien: piano, wurlitzer, hammond organ, vocals
- Helge Sten (Deathprod): theremin, mellotron, samples, synthesizer

with:

- Øyvind Enger: cello on "Sungravy"
- Lars Mølna: viola on "Sungravy"
- Øyvind Brandtsegg: string arrangement on "Sungravy", vibraphone on "The Golden Core"
- Anneli Drecker: back. vocals on "The Golden Core"
- Kim Hiorthøy: cover artwork
