= Motorpsycho (band) =

Norwegian rock band from Trondheim

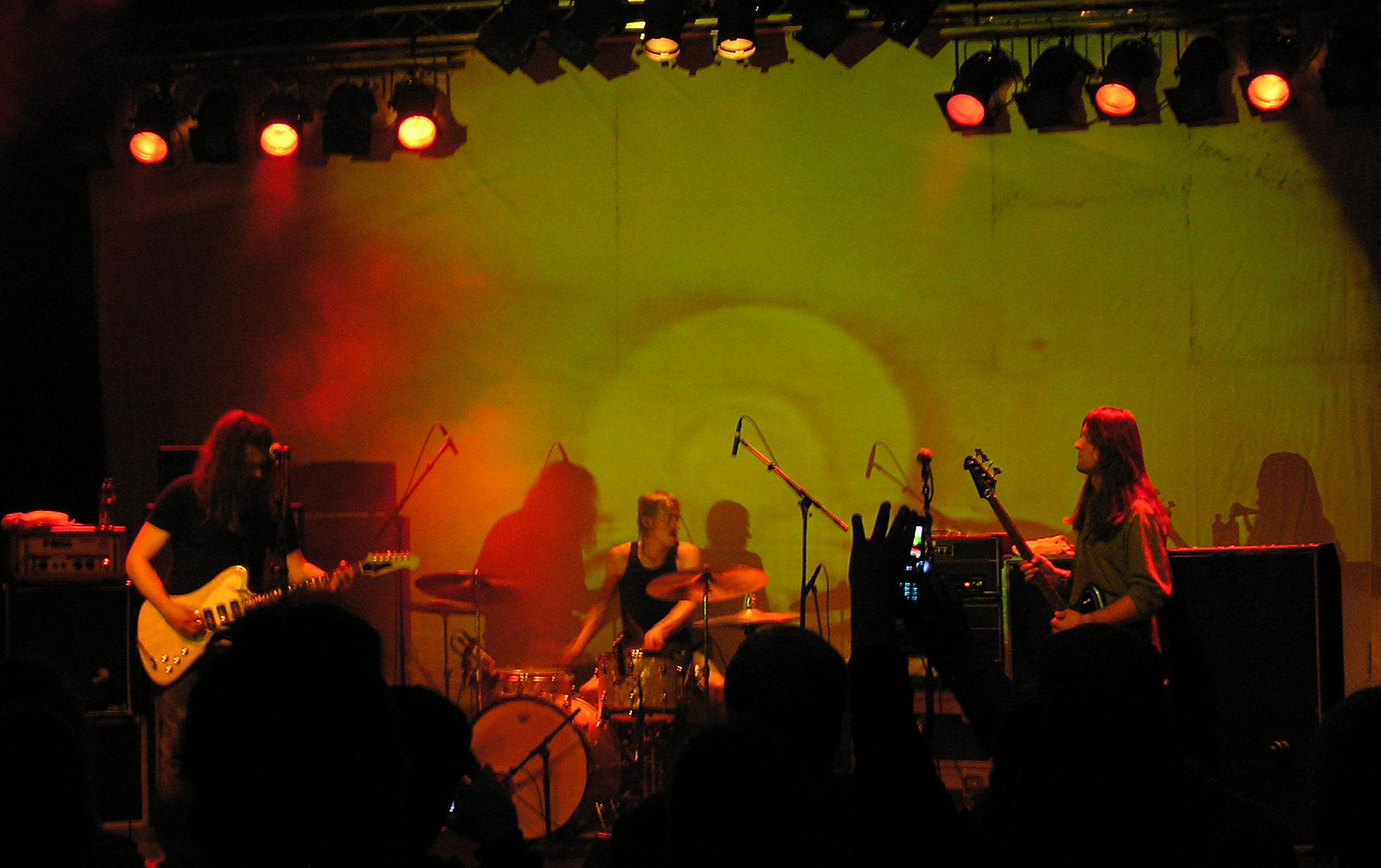
- Motorpsycho playing live at Studenten, Steinkjer, 2008-04-18

Background information
- Origin: Trondheim, Norway
- Genres: Psychedelic rock, indie rock, alternative rock, progressive rock, hard rock, noise rock
- Years active: 1989–present
- Labels: Rune Grammofon (2008–present); Stickman Records (1994–present); Sony Norway (1994–2007, Norway only); Voices of Wonder (1990–1993)
- Members: Hans Magnus Ryan; Bent Sæther
- Past members: Håkon Gebhardt; Helge Sten; Lars Lien; Morten Fagervik; Kjell Runar Jenssen; Kenneth Kapstad; Tomas Järmyr
- Website: Motorpsycho official Website; Motorpsycho unofficial Website

Motorpsycho is a Norwegian rock band from Trondheim. Their music can generally be defined as progressive or psychedelic rock, but they also mix in elements from alternative, jazz, post-rock, pop, country and many other musical styles. The stable members of the band are Bent Sæther (born 18 February 1969, bass/vocals) and Hans Magnus "Snah" Ryan (born 31 December 1969, guitar/vocals). From 1992 to March 2005, Håkon Gebhardt (born 21 June 1969) was the band's drummer. From December 2007 to May 2016 Kenneth Kapstad was the drummer of the band, being replaced by Tomas Järmyr, who joined in early 2017. Järmyr left the band in January 2023.

== Biography ==
Formed in the late 1980s as an alternative metal band (they picked their name after seeing the Russ Meyer film of the same name as part of a Russ Meyer triple bill – there was already a band named after Mudhoney and a band named after Faster, Pussycat! Kill! Kill! – the other two films on the bill), Motorpsycho soon developed a unique blend of grunge, heavy metal and indie rock, as well as incorporating the sonic noise experiments of associated member Deathprod. The hugely ambitious, progressive double album Demon Box (1993) followed a series of low-profile EPs and albums, earning the band a nomination for a Norwegian Grammy, and secured a loyal following in Germany, Italy, Belgium and the Netherlands as well as in Scandinavia.

The 1990s was an extremely productive era for the band. They released new material almost every year and enjoyed critical acclaim for each album—though not the massive sales the music press kept predicting.

With the 2000 album Let Them Eat Cake, Motorpsycho suddenly took huge steps away from their noisy hard rock roots, opting instead for a smoother, jazz-tinged approach to the songwriting and recording process. They kept this technique for the subsequent releases, Phanerothyme and It's A Love Cult.

Drummer Hakon Gebhardt left the band in 2003. The double album Black Hole/Blank Canvas was released 17/20 March 2006 in Europe, with Bent Saether playing drums. The album received great reviews. Drums on the following tour were played by Jacco van Rooij.

On 28 March 2008 Motorpsycho released an album entitled Little Lucid Moments, with new drummer Kenneth Kapstad, and on 16 March 2008 a DVD containing music videos, live footage and documentaries entitled Haircuts.

To celebrate their 20th anniversary, the band released a vinyl-only album, Child of the Future, recorded by Steve Albini at the beginning of August 2009.

In January 2010 Motorpsycho released the album Heavy Metal Fruit, their first album featuring an external producer, Kåre Vestrheim, and also their third album in under two years.

In October 2011 the Dutch venue Effenaar released a limited edition live album exclusively on vinyl entitled Strings Of Stroop – Motorpsycho Live At Effenaar. The album features four Motorpsycho tracks recorded during various Motorpsycho shows at Effenaar between 1999 and 2010. Only 500 copies were pressed and sold at the band's 14th show in the venue.

On 10 February 2012 Motorpsycho released the double CD/LP effort The Death Defying Unicorn in collaboration with keyboardist Ståle Storløkken from the free improv group Supersilent. The album is a reworking of an instrumental suite commissioned by and performed at Moldejazz 2010. During 2011, Sæther produced lyrics for a sweeping narrative, thus making the album version a concept album. As in its initial performance at the Norwegian Opera and Ballet, the band and Storløkken are augmented by contributions from Trondheimssolistene, Trondheim Jazz Orchestra, violinist Ola Kvernberg and long time collaborating visual artist Pekka Stokke on stage design. The core quartet performed the album in its entirety on every date during a March/April 2012 tour of Europe.

After the release and tour accompanying the Unicorn, the band felt the need to return to more traditional, guitar-based grounds and with Reine Fiske as second guitarist, recorded two albums, Still Life With Eggplant (released in spring 2013) and Behind the Sun (released in March 2014). To coincide with the release of Behind the Sun, Motorpsycho launched their first-ever official website, www.motorpsycho.no.

After years of institutionalising the band in Norway, Motorpsycho were inducted at Rockheim, Norway's rock music hall of fame, in a TV broadcast ceremony.

In 2016 the band released the studio album Here Be Monsters, which evolved from a piece of music they wrote for the Oslo Teknisk Museums birthday. The band played some songs in the museum, with the help of Ståle Storløkken, and then decided to work on it in the studio.

In May 2016, after completing the European Here Be Monsters Tour, Kenneth Kapstad left Motorpsycho. Core members Sæther and Ryan spent the remainder of the year writing, rehearsing and performing a live score to the Carl Frode Tiller-written play Begynnnelser (eng. Beginnings) in a 38-date autumn run at Trøndelag Teater.

In a January 2, 2017, news update on their official home page, the band announced Swedish drummer Tomas Järmyr to be the third permanent member of Motorpsycho. Together, they have recorded The Tower in Los Angeles and Joshua Tree (at the famous recording studio, Rancho de la Luna), which was released on September 8 the same year.

On January 8, 2023, Järmyr left the band.

In 2024 Motorpsycho contributed their version of the song "Up to Me" from the 1971 album Aqualung by Jethro Tull to the album Aqualung (Redux) released through Magnetic Eye Records on 6 December 2024. The song has been referred to as "the album's strangest song, a mixture of psychedelic blues" and "medieval-sounding acoustic verses highlighted by flute and percussion." They wanted to make a modern version of the song and not sound "too close to the original." The result was a heavier version that "retained the characteristic flute interludes" with a "rumbling bassline that rattles along on its own momentum."

== Line up ==
=== Current line up ===
- Bent Sæther – lead vocals, bass, guitars, keyboards, drums (1989– )
- Hans Magnus "Snah" Ryan – lead guitars, vocals, keyboards, mandolin, violin, bass (1989– )

=== Previous members ===
- Kjell Runar "Killer" Jenssen – drums (1989–1991)
- Håkon Gebhardt – drums, vocals, banjo, guitar (1991–2005)
- Helge "Deathprod" Sten – theremin, various electronics, audio virus (1992–1994; frequent guest and producer 1994–2002, 2007, 2015, 2019)
- Lars Lien – keyboards, vocals (1993–1996, 2004; infrequent guest)
- Morten "Lolly" Fagervik – rhythm guitar, keyboards, drums (1994–1996, 2004)
- Kenneth Kapstad – drums (2007–2016)
- Tomas Järmyr – drums (2017–2023)

=== Major collaborators ===
- Matt Burt – voice, poetry (1993, 1996)
- Kjell Karlsen – steel guitar, vocals (1994, 2004)
- Øyvind Brandtsegg – Marimba Lumina and ImproSculpt programming (1994; live, 2006)
- Ole Henrik "Ohm" Moe – violin, saw, piano (1996–2000, 2013)
- Baard Slagsvold – keyboards, vocals (1999–2003)
- Jacco van Rooij – drums (live, 2006)
- Pekka Stokke – visuals (live, 2006—)
- Ståle Storløkken – keyboards (2010–2012, 2014)
- Reine Fiske – guitar, keyboards (2012–2014, 2018– )
- Ola Kvernberg – violin (2012–2013, 2018–2022)
- Kristoffer Lo – keyboards, flugabone, rhythm guitar, backing vocals (live, 2017)
- Lars Horntveth – guitar, flute, keyboards (2001–2002, 2018—2020)
- Ole Paus – guitar, vocals (2019—2020; died 2023)
- Olaf Olsen – drums (live/studio, 2023)
- Ingvald André Vassbø – drums (live/studio, 2023– )
- TrondheimSolistene
- Trondheim Jazzorkester

== Honors ==
=== Spellemannsprisen ===
Spellemannprisen is often referred to as the Norwegian Grammy Awards in English. It is a Norwegian music award presented to Norwegian musicians.

As of 2020, Motorpsycho have received 14 nominations, with four wins.

- Spellemannprisen 1993 nominated in the class Rock, for the album Demon Box
- Spellemannprisen 1994 in the class Best album cover, for the album Timothy's Monster created by Kim Hiorthøy
- Spellemannprisen 1996 in the class Rock, for the album Blissard
- Spellemannprisen 1997 in the class Hard rock, for the album Angels and Daemons at Play
- Spellemannprisen 2000 in the class Rock, for the album Let Them Eat Cake
- Spellemannprisen 2001 nominated in the class Rock, for the album Phanerothyme
- Spellemannprisen 2003 nominated in the class Åpen klasse, for the album In The Fishtank (With Jaga Jazzist Horns).
- Spellemannprisen 2008 nominated in the class Rock, for the album Little Lucid Moments
- Spellemannprisen 2009 nominated in the class Rock, for the album Child of the Future
- Spellemannprisen 2010 nominated in the class Rock, for the album Heavy Metal Fruit
- Spellemannprisen 2012 nominated in the class Rock, for the album The Death-Defying Unicorn
- Spellemannprisen 2013 nominated in the class Rock, for the album Still Life With Eggplant
- Spellemannprisen 2017 nominated in the class Rock, for the album The Tower
- Spellemannprisen 2020 nominated in the class Rock, for the album The All Is One

=== Other ===
- 1999: Gammleng Award in the class Pop/Rock
- 2001: Alarm Award in the class Rock for the album Let Them Eat Cake
- 2010: Edvard Prize for the album Child of the Future
- 2012: Trondheim Municipality Cultur Prize
- 2015: Nord-Trøndelag County Cultur Prize
- 2017: Rockheim Hall of Fame inductees

== Discography ==
=== Albums ===
Year	Album	Peak positions						Notes
Year	Album	NOR	GER	BEL	NLD	SWI	ITA	Notes
1991	Lobotomizer	—	—	—	—	—	—	Released as LP and CD
1992	Soothe (mini album)	—	—	—	—	—	—	Mini LP later issued on CD as "8 Soothing Songs for Rut", with two tracks from the "3 Songs for Rut" EP (see Compilations under).
1993	Demon Box	—	—	—	—	—	—	Double LP and CD (omitting three songs due to space limitations)
1994	Timothy's Monster	7	—	—	—	—	—	Triple LP box and double CD, re-released in 2010 as 4CD-box
1996	Blissard	3	—	—	—	—	—	Double LP and CD, re-released in 2012 as 4CD-box
1997	Angels and Daemons at Play	2	—	—	—	—	—	Double LP, CD (omitting two songs) and three separate CD-EPs ("Babyscooter", "Have Spacesuit Will Travel" and "Lovelight"), re-released in 2016 as 6CD-box
1998	Trust Us	7	—	—	—	—	—	Double LP and double CD
2000	Let Them Eat Cake	1	83	—	—	—	—	LP and CD
2001	Barracuda (mini album)	8	—	—	—	—	—	LP and CD
2001	Phanerothyme	1	80	—	—	—	—	LP and CD
2002	It's A Love Cult	2	91	—	—	—	—	LP and CD
2006	Black Hole/Blank Canvas	2	—	85	—	—	—	Double LP, double CD and limited edition double CD with 2 track bonus single
2008	Little Lucid Moments	2	—	—	—	—	—	Double LP and CD
2009	Child of the Future	2	—	—	—	—	—	Vinyl-only LP
2010	Heavy Metal Fruit	2	96	—	—	—	—	Double LP and CD
2013	Still Life With Eggplant	2	93	—	79	—	—	LP and CD
2014	Behind the Sun	6	53	—	81	—	63	Double LP, CD, digital download
2014	The Motorpnakotic Fragments	—	—	—	—	—	—	Limited edition 4×7″ and CD
2016	Here Be Monsters	2	55	—	—	—	—	LP and CD
2016	Here Be Monsters Vol 2	—	—	—	—	—	—	Limited edition Mini-LP, CD
2017	Begynnelser	—	—	—	—	—	—	2×10″ with CD, and DVD of the theatrical play "Begynnelser"
2017	The Tower	3	56	—	—	—	—	2LP, 2CD. Part 1 of the Gullvåg Trilogy.
2019	The Crucible	4	43	—	196	88	—	LP and CD. Part 2 of the Gullvåg Trilogy.
2020	The All Is One	3	31	—	—	53	—	2LP and 2CD. Part 3 of the Gullvåg Trilogy.
2021	Kingdom of Oblivion	3	19	—	—	41	—	2LP, CD, digital download
2022	Ancient Astronauts	8	80	—	—	96	—	LP, CD, digital download
2023	Yay!	—	77	—	—	—	—	LP, CD, digital download
2024	Neigh!!	—	—	—	—	—	—	LP, digital download
2025	Motorpsycho	22	—	—	—	—	—	2LP, 2CD, digital download
2025	Ahsol Caravan	—	—	—	—	—	—	CD, digital download
2026	The Gaia II Space Corps	—	76	—	—	—	—	CD, LP, Cassette, digital download

=== As Motorpsycho & Friends ===
Year	Album	Peak positions	Notes
Year	Album	NOR	Notes
1994	The Tussler – Original Motion Picture Soundtrack	10	Original CD (1994); 2×10″ (1996); Remastered and extended CD/double LP (2003)

=== As Motorpsycho & Ståle Storløkken ===
Year	Album	Label	Peak positions		Notes
Year	Album	Label	NOR	GER	Notes
2012	The Death Defying Unicorn	Stickman Records	7	87	Double LP and double CD
2015	En Konsert For Folk Flest	Rune Grammofon	-	-	Live double LP and double CD

=== As The International Tussler Society ===
Year	Album	Peak positions	Notes
Year	Album	NOR	Notes
2004	Motorpsycho presents The International Tussler Society	1	Released as double LP and CD, both came with bonus DVD

- 2004: "Satans Favourite Son" (Promo-single)
- 2004: "Laila Lou" (Promo-single)

=== Live albums ===
Year	Album	Peak positions	Notes
Year	Album	NOR	Notes
1999	Roadwork Vol. 1 – Heavy metal iz a poze, hardt rock iz a leifschteil	7	Live in Europe 1998
2001	Roadwork Vol. 2 – The MotorSourceMassacre: Motorpsycho, The Source and Deathprod	–	Live at Kongsberg Jazzfestival 1995
2008	Roadwork Vol. 3 – The Four Norsemen of the Apocalypse	–	Live at the Paradiso, Amsterdam, November 23, 2002. Included in the double DVD release Haircuts, re-issued on vinyl with CD/digital download 2018
2011	Roadwork Vol. 4 – Intrepid Skronk	26	Live in Europe 2008–2010
2011	Strings Of Stroop – Motorpsycho Live at Effenaar	–	Limited edition vinyl, semi-official release by the Effenaar music club.
2014	Vera, September 19, 1993	–	DVD issued as part of the "Deluxe" edition of Demon Box.
2016	Rockefeller, March 14, 1997	–	2 CD issued as part of the "Deluxe" edition of Angels and Daemons at Play.
2018	A Boxful of Demons	–	Limited vinyl/CD/Blu-ray of the Demon Box album performed live at Rockheim, Trondheim, 17.-19.10.2015 on C+C Records/Falck Forlag
2018	Roadwork Vol. 5 – Field Notes: The Fantastic Expedition of Järmyr, Ryan, Sæther & Lo	–	Live in Europe 2017
2020	Cloudwalkers - Freak Valley Festival, May 31, 2014	–	Limited edition vinyl, semi-official release on Devil's Child records
2022	Live at Blitz '93	–	Live at the Blitz House social center March 13, 1993. Issued as part of the Salad Days vol. 2 compilation.

=== Collaborations ===
Year	Album	Peak positions	Notes
Year	Album	NOR	Notes
1993	Into The Sun (split release with Hedge Hog)		Split 7-inch/CD-single
2001	Go To California (split EP release with The Soundtrack of Our Lives)		Split-EP, 2×7″ vinyl
2003	In the Fishtank 10 (mini album with Jaga Jazzist Horns)	7	Collaboration, 12-inch mini album
2020	Så nær, så nær (With Ole Paus as Ole Paus/Bent Sæther/Hans Magnus Ryan/Tomas Järmyr/Reine Fiske)	1	Collaboration, 2×LP/CD
2022	A Memory / Lue Lue (split release with Sanderfinger)		Split 7-inch

=== Compilations ===
Year	Album	Peak positions	Notes
Year	Album	NOR	Notes
1992	8 Soothing Songs For Rut	-	Vinyl mini-album "Soothe" and two tracks from 7-inch EP "3 Songs For Rut" on one CD
2015	Supersonic Scientists - A Young Person's Guide To Motorpsycho	-	2LP compilation of one track from each album 1991-2014
2019	The Light Fantastic	-	LP, digital download. Collection of B-sides and studio outtakes.
2022	Salad Days vol. 1	-	4 disc vinyl box with "Lobotomizer" LP (1991), "Soothe" mini-LP (1992) and new 2LP compilation "Becoming Motorpsycho - Juvenilia, oddities and artefacts from the vaults, 1990-1993"
2022	Salad Days vol. 2	-	5 disc vinyl box with 2LP "Demon Box" (1993), "Mountain EP" (1993), "Another Ugly EP (1994)" and new live album "Live at Blitz '93".

=== EPs ===
Year	Album	Peak positions
Year	Album	NOR
1990	Maiden Voyage (Demo)	
1993	Mountain	
1993	Another Ugly EP	
1994	Wearing Yr Smell EP	
1996	Nerve Tattoo	8
1996	Manmower	
1997	Babyscooter	14
1997	Have Spacesuit, Will Travel	13
1997	Lovelight	13
1997	Starmelt	13
1998	Ozone	6
1998	Hey Jane	8
2000	The Other Fool EP	1
2000	Walkin' with J EP	6
2002	Serpentine EP	2
2017	California EP	
2019	Terje Brekkstads kosmiske reise	

=== Singles ===
- 1992: 3 Songs for Rut
- 1996: Sinful, Windborne
- 2001: The Slow Phaseout (Promo single)
- 2001: Go To California (Promo single)
- 2006: Hyena (Promo-single)
- 2010: X-3
- 2010: The Visitant
- 2014: Toys (Included with select copies of August edition of Trondheim magazine "Gatemagasinet Sorgenfri")
- 2015: Psychonaut/Toys
- 2016: Spin, Spin, Spin
- 2020: X-mastime Is Here!
- 2021: Ulv! Ulv!

=== Singles and music videos ===
- Have Fun (1992)
- Sheer Profundity (1993)
- Nothing To Say (1993)
- Another Ugly Tune (1994)
- Wearing Yr Smell (1994)
- Feel (1994)
- Now It's Time To Skate (1994)
- Watersound (1994)
- Mad Sun (1996)
- Manmower (1996)
- Sinful, Wind-Borne (1996)
- The Nerve Tattoo (1996)
- Starmelt/Lovelight (1997)
- Hey, Jane (1998)
- The Other Fool (2000)
- Walkin' With J (2000)
- Go To California (2000)
- The Slow Phaseout (2001)
- Serpentine (2002)
- Victim of Rock (2014)
- On a Plate (2014)
- Spin, Spin, Spin (2016)
- Intrepid Explorer (2018)
- W.C.A. (2023)
- Stanley (Tonight's the Night) (2025)

== See also ==
- The International Tussler Society
- Deathprod
- Jaga Jazzist

Awards
Preceded by Seigmen	Recipient of the Rock Spellemannprisen; 1996	Succeeded by Poor Rich Ones
Preceded by No Hard rock award	Recipient of the Hard rock Spellemannprisen; 1997	Succeeded by The Kovenant
Preceded by Madrugada	Recipient of the Rock Spellemannprisen; 2000	Succeeded by Kaizers Orchestra
