= Angels and Daemons at Play =

Studio album by Motorpsycho
- Released: January/February, 1997
- Recorded: October 1996
- Genre: Rock
- Length: 58:34 (single CD); 73:19 (triple-CDEP-box); 78:45 (double LP)
- Label: Stickman (Europe); Sony (Norway)
- Producer: Motorpsycho & Deathprod

Motorpsycho chronology
Blissard (1996)	Angels and Daemons at Play (1997)	Trust Us (1998)

Angels and Daemons at Play is the sixth full-length studio album by the Norwegian rock-band Motorpsycho.

The album was originally released as three EP's; "Babyscooter" (released January 27), "Have Spacesuit Will Travel" (February 3) and "Lovelight" (February 10). Only 500 copies were pressed of each.

It was later also released as a single CD and on double LP, the latter featuring the two bonus tracks "Have Spacesuit, Will Travel" (from the EP of the same name), and "Back to Source" (to be released on the Ozone EP the following year).

The cover art was made by Kim Hiorthøy.

It was in the Norwegian charts for 5 weeks, reaching a peak of #2.

== Track listings ==
=== Single CD version ===
All tracks are written by Håkon Gebhardt, Hans Magnus Ryan, Bent Sæther except where noted.

No.	Title	Writer(s)	Length
0.	"Ohm's Concerto for Alto and Soprano Saw" (Hidden track in the pregap of the CD, playable by rewinding past the start of the playback.)	O.H. Moe	1:28
1.	"Sideway Spiral"	Ryan, Sæther	2:33
2.	"Walking on the Water"	Sæther	4:19
3.	"Heartattack Mac"		7:41
4.	"Pills, Powders + Passion Plays"	Sæther	3:24
5.	"In the Family"	Sæther	5:24
6.	"Un Chien d'Espace"		13:40
7.	"Sideway Spiral II"		3:21
8.	"Like Always"	Ryan, Sæther	3:39
9.	"Stalemate"	Sæther	4:55
10.	"Starmelt/Lovelight"		3:30
11.	"Timothy's Monster"		4:16
Total length:			58:34

=== Double LP version ===
==== Side 1 ====
All tracks are written by Gebhardt, Ryan, Sæther except where noted.

No.	Title	Writer(s)	Length
1.	"Sideway Spiral"	Ryan, Sæther	2:33
2.	"Walking on the Water"	Sæther	4:19
3.	"Heartattack Mac"		7:41
4.	"Pills, Powders + Passion Plays"	Sæther	3:24
Total length:			17:57

==== Side 2 ====
No.	Title	Writer(s)	Length
1.	"In the Family"	Sæther	5:24
2.	"Un Chien d'Espace"		13:40
Total length:			19:04

==== Side 3 ====
No.	Title	Writer(s)	Length
1.	"Back to Source"	Sæther	6:34
2.	"Have Spacesuit, Will Travel"	Gebhardt, Ryan, Sæther, Robert A. Heinlein	13:51
3.	"Ohm's Concerto for Alto and Soprano Saw"	O.H. Moe	1:38
Total length:			22:03

==== Side 4 ====
No.	Title	Writer(s)	Length
1.	"Sideway Spiral II"		3:21
2.	"Like Always"	Ryan, Sæther	3:39
3.	"Stalemate"	Sæther	4:45
4.	"Starmelt/Lovelight"		3:30
5.	"Timothy's Monster"		4:16
Total length:			19:31

=== The original EPs ===
Babyscooter

1. "Sideway Spiral" – 2:33
2. "Walking on the Water" – 4:19
3. "Heartattack Mac" – 7:41
4. "Pills Powders + Passion Plays" – 3:24
5. "In the Family" – 5:24

Have Spacesuit Will Travel

1. "Un Chien d'Espace" – 13:40
2. "Have Spacesuit, Will Travel" – 13:51
3. "Ohm's Concerto for Alto and Soprano Saw" – 1:38

Lovelight

1. "Sideway Spiral II" – 3:21
2. "Like Always" – 3:39
3. "Stalemate" – 4:55
4. "Starmelt/Lovelight" – 3:30
5. "Timothy's Monster" – 4:16
6. "Atlantis Swing" - 1:08

== Songwriters ==
"Ohm's Concerto for Alto and Soprano Saw" – O.H. Moe;
"Sideway Spiral I", "Like Always", "Back to Source" – Ryan/Sæther;
"Walking on the Water", "Pills, Powders + Passion Plays", "In the Family", "Stalemate" – Sæther;
"Heartattack Mac", "Sideway Spiral II", "Starmelt/Lovelight", "Timothy's Monster", "Un Chien D'espace" – Gebhardt/Ryan/Sæther;
"Have Spacesuit, Will Travel" – Gebhardt/Ryan/Sæther/Henlein
"Atlantis Swing" – unknown, but possibly Gebhardt/Ryan/Sæther/Fagervik

== Performers ==
- Bent Sæther — vocals, bass, electric & acoustic guitars, piano, mellotron, rhodes, moog taurus, percussion; drum solo on "Sideway Spiral I"
- Hans Magnus Ryan — vocals, electric & acoustic guitars, bass, double bass, piano, organ, vibraphone, moog taurus, percussion; drums on "Atlantic Swing"
- Håkon Gebhardt — drums, percussion, banjo, piano, vocals
- Ole Henrik Moe — alto + soprano saw, piano, violin
- Deathprod — oscillators, echoplex, reverators, ring modulators
- Morten Fagervik — guitar on "Atlantis Swing"
