= Let them eat cake (disambiguation) =

"Let them eat cake" is a translation of the French "qu'ils mangent de la brioche", typically (though probably erroneously) attributed to Marie Antoinette.

Let them eat cake may also refer to:

- Let 'Em Eat Cake, a Broadway musical that opened in 1933
- Let Them Eat Cake (TV series), a 1999 BBC comedy TV series
- Let Them Eat Cake (album), a 2000 Motorpsycho album
- Let 'Em Eat Cake, a 2014 Alexz Johnson album
- "Let Them Eat Cake", a 1993 episode of Rugrats
- "Let 'Em Eat Cake" (Arrested Development), a 2004 television episode
- "Let Them Eat Cake" (House), a 2008 television episode
- "Let Them Eat Cake" (Only When I Laugh), a 1979 television episode
- Let Them Eat Cake, a music festival on New Year's Day in the Werribee Park, Werribee, Australia
- Let Them Eat Cake, a 2014 documentary film by Alexis Krasilovsky
