= Blissard =

Studio album by Motorpsycho
- Released: February 16, 1996
- Recorded: Sep–Dec 1995
- Length: 61:46 (CD); 53:10 (LP)
- Label: Stickman Records
- Producers: Bent Sæther, Deathprod, Pieter Kloos

Motorpsycho chronology
Timothy's Monster (1994)	Blissard (1996)	Angels and Daemons at Play (1997)

Blissard is the fifth full-length studio album by the Norwegian band Motorpsycho. It was the first where the band tried to bring some more focused and pre-written songs to tape, as opposed to their earlier working technique of doing lot of experimentation and brainstorming in the studio. It is often ranked among their best works by fans and critics.

== Track listing ==
No.	Title	Written by	Length
0.	"Jazz på trøndska (Hidden track found by rewinding the entire CD.)"		8:35
1.	"Sinful, Wind-borne"	Sæther	5:21
2.	""Drug Thing""	Sæther	4:37
3.	"Greener"	Sæther	6:14
4.	"'s Numbness"	Sæther	3:57
5.	"The Nerve Tattoo"	Sæther/Gebhardt	4:02
6.	"True Middle"	Sæther/Burt	4:51
7.	"S.T.G."	Sæther	9:45
8.	"Manmower"	Sæther/Ryan	4:15
9.	"Fool's Gold"	Sæther	3:57
10.	"Nathan Daniel's Tune From Hawaii"	Sten	6:11
Total length:			61:46

== LP track listing ==
Blissard was also released on heavy-weight double vinyl to be played at 45 rpm. The track listing was as follows.

Side A
No.	Title	Written by	Length
1.	"Sinful, Wind-borne"	Sæther	5:21
2.	""Drug Thing""	Sæther	4:37

Side B
No.	Title	Written by	Length
3.	"Greener"	Sæther	6:14
4.	"'s Numbness"	Sæther	3:57
5.	"The Nerve Tattoo"	Sæther/Gebhardt	4:02

Side C
No.	Title	Written by	Length
6.	"True Middle"	Sæther/Burt	4:51
7.	"S.T.G."	Sæther	9:45

Side D
No.	Title	Written by	Length
8.	"Manmower"	Sæther/Ryan	4:15
9.	"Fool's Gold"	Sæther	3:57
10.	"Nathan Daniel's Tune From Hawaii"	Sten	6:11
Total length:			53:10

== Track listing 2012 4-CD reissue ==
A 4-disc deluxe edition was released 23. November 2012 by Rune Grammofon, and includes the original album, the KiT-sessions, an additional mix of the original album with different track listing, as well as a fourth disc with B-sides and rarities.

=== Disc 1: The Original Album ===
1. Sinful, Wind-borne
2. "Drug Thing"
3. Greener
4. 's Numbness
5. The Nerve Tattoo
6. True Middle
7. S.T.G.
8. Manmower
9. Fool's Gold
10. Nathan Daniel's Tune From Hawaii

=== Disc 2: When the World Sleeps (The KiT-sessions, 1994) ===
1. Stalemate
2. Flick of the Wrist
3. When the World Sleeps
4. Black W'abbit
5. The Ballad of Patrick & Putrick
6. 7th Dream
7. Mad Sun

=== Disc 3: The Pidah Mixes ===
1. Sinful, Wind-borne
2. "Drug Thing"
3. Greener
4. The Matter With Her
5. 's Numbness
6. The Nerve Tattoo
7. Manmower
8. Like Always
9. True Middle
10. S.T.G.
11. Stalemate

=== Disc 4: The Ones That Got Away B-sides, rehearsal tapes, the Atlantis psychosis files... ===
1. The Nerve Tattoo
2. Of Beacons & Beams
3. The Wheel
4. Pale Day
5. Mad Sun (short version)
6. A Saw Sage Full of Secretion
7. Heaven and Hell
8. Sterling Says
9. Never Judge
10. Baby Scooter
11. In the Midst of All That
12. Silver Tongue
13. Dave Gave Up
14. That Dying Breed
15. "Drug Thing"
16. A Shortcut to the Stars
17. La Luna
18. Atlantis Swing
19. Familjen tar plats i studion/Fyra kvällar session
20. Jazz på trøndska

== Personnel ==
- Bent Sæther: vocals, bass, guitars, taurus,
- Hans Magnus Ryan: lead and rhythm guitars, vocals, taurus, banjo
- Håkon Gebhardt: drums
- Morten Fagervik: rhythm guitars, mellotron, clavinette, viscount organ, piano, vibraphone, vocals

with:

- Helge Sten (Deathprod): samples, echoplex, oscillator, theremin
- Ole Henrik Moe (Ohm): saw, violins
- Bitten Forsudd: backing vocals
- Rolf Yngve Uggen: backing vocals
- Matt Burt: voice
- M. Banto: pandeiro

== Book ==
The deluxe edition released in 2012 was accompanied by a 330-page book about the album, written by Norwegian author Johan Harstad. The book was released in both hardback (limited to 980 copies) and pocket editions. The book was published by Falck forlag, as a part of an ongoing series of books related to Morgenbladets list of the hundred best Norwegian albums.
