= Trust Us =

Studio album by Motorpsycho
- Released: March 4, 1998
- Recorded: 1997/1998
- Genre: Rock
- Length: 81:36
- Label: Stickman (Europe); Sony (Norway)
- Producer: Motorpsycho, Deathprod

Motorpsycho chronology
Angels and Daemons at Play (1997)	Trust Us (1998)	Let Them Eat Cake (2000)

Trust Us is the seventh full-length studio album by the Norwegian rock-band Motorpsycho.

The tracks "Ozone" and "Hey, Jane" were also released as EPs. In 1999, The song "Vortex surfer" was selected by the NRK P3 radio-station as the "song of the millennium", and was played continuously for 24 hours on December 31.

The cover-art was, as usual, made by Kim Hiorthøy, who also directed the promo-videos for the two EPs.

== Track listing ==
=== Disc 1 ===
No.	Title	Writer(s)	Length
1.	"Psychonaut"	Bent Sæther	6:58
2.	"Ozone"	Sæther	4:33
3.	"The Ocean in Her Eye"	Hans Magnus Ryan, Sæther, Helge Sten	9:15
4.	"Vortex Surfer"	Ryan, Sæther	8:59
5.	"Syddhardtino"	Trygve Seim	1:37
6.	"577"	Sæther	7:48
Total length:			39:10

==== Disc 2 ====
No.	Title	Writer(s)	Length
1.	"Evernine"	Ryan, Sæther	5:07
2.	"Mantrick Muffin Stomp"	Ryan, Sæther	3:50
3.	"Radiance Frequency"	Sæther	10:21
4.	"Taifun"	Håkon Gebhardt, Ryan, Sæther	7:09
5.	"Superstooge"	Gebhardt, Ryan, Sæther	6:48
6.	"Coventry Boy"	Ryan	2:32
7.	"Hey, Jane"	Sæther	5:14
8.	"Dolphin"	Ryan, Sæther, Seim	1:25
Total length:			42:26

== Personnel ==
- Bent Sæther: vocals, bass, guitars, piano, percussion, harmonium, marimba, vibraphone, trident, mellotron, sitar, taurus, drums
- Hans Magnus Ryan: guitars, vocals, mandolin, harmonium, rhodes piano, taurus, mellotron, piano, bells
- Håkon Gebhardt: drums, acoustic guitar, glockenspiel, mellotron, harmonium, percussion

with

- Helge Sten (Deathprod): loops, theremin, echomachines
- Ole Henrik Moe (Ohm): saw, violin, glass
- Trygve Seim: reindeer antler, flutes, saxophone, clarophone
- Tone Reichelt: French horn on "Taifun"
- Kai O. Andersen: Upright bass on "Ozone"
- Jarle Vespestad: beats on "Evernine"
