= The All Is One =

Studio album by Motorpsycho
- Released: August 28, 2020
- Recorded: September – November 2019
- Genre: Psychedelic rock, progressive rock, alternative rock
- Length: 84:42
- Label: Stickman Records; Rune Grammofon
- Producer: Bent Sæther

Motorpsycho chronology
The Crucible (2019)	The All Is One (2020)	Kingdom of Oblivion (2021)

Professional ratings
Aggregate scores
Source	Rating
Metacritic	(85/100)
Review scores
Source	Rating
AllMusic	4/5 stars
Sputnikmusic	4.4/5 stars

The All Is One is a studio album by Norwegian rock band Motorpsycho, released on August 28, 2020, through Stickman Records and Rune Grammofon. This is the third and final installment in the band's Gullvåg Trilogy with the first installment being 2017's The Tower and the second installment being 2019's The Crucible. The album is available as a double vinyl, double CD and digital download.

== Track listing ==
Disc one
No.	Title	Writer(s)	Length
1.	"The All Is One"	Bent Sæther	8:50
2.	"The Same Old Rock (One Must Imagine Sisyphus Happy)"	Sæther	5:17
3.	"The Magpie"	Hans Magnus Ryan, Sæther	5:35
4.	"Delusion (The Reign of Humbug)"	Sæther	2:44
5.	"N.O.X. I: Circles Around the Sun pt. 1"	Ryan, Sæther	9:10
6.	"N.O.X. II: Ouroboros (Strange Loop)"	Lars Horntveth, Sæther	8:22
7.	"N.O.X. III: Ascension"	Sæther	3:36
Total length:			43:37

Disc two
No.	Title	Writer(s)	Length
1.	"N.O.X. IV: Night of Pan"	Ola Kvernberg, Ryan, Sæther	15:32
2.	"N.O.X. V: Circles Around the Sun pt. 2"	Tomas Järmyr, Sæther	5:54
3.	"A Little Light"	Sæther	2:18
4.	"Dreams of Fancy"	Sæther	9:36
5.	"The Dowser"	Sæther	2:45
6.	"Like Chrome"	Ryan, Sæther	5:03
Total length:			41:12

== Personnel ==
Motorpsycho

- Bent Sæther – vocals, bass, guitar, keyboards, drums
- Hans Magnus Ryan – lead guitar, vocals, keyboards, mandolin, violin, bass
- Tomas Järmyr – drums, vocals

Additional Musicians

- Reine Fiske – guitar ("The All Is One", "The Same Old Rock", "The Magpie", "Dreams of Fancy", "The Dowser")
- Lars Horntveth – saxophones, clarinet ("N.O.X.")
- Ola Kvernberg – violin ("N.O.X.")
