= Child of the Future =

Studio album by Motorpsycho
- Released: August 7, 2009
- Recorded: 2008
- Genres: Psychedelic rock, hard rock
- Length: 39:30
- Labels: Stickman Records; Rune Grammofon
- Producer: Bent Sæther

Motorpsycho chronology
| Little Lucid Moments (2008) | Child of the Future (2009) | Heavy Metal Fruit (2010) |

Child of the Future is the thirteenth full-length studio album by the Norwegian band Motorpsycho that was released on August 7, 2009, via Rune Grammofon and Stickman Records. It marked the 20th anniversary of the band and in order to celebrate this, the band released "Child of the Future" on vinyl only; however with "spectacular design work", which includes a 24" poster and a cutout on the front. The album was originally scheduled to be released at the beginning of June 2009 but was delayed.

The album was recorded by Steve Albini and produced by Bent Sæther.

As with most Motorpsycho albums the cover art was created by Kim Hiorthøy.

== Track listing ==
Side A
| No. | Title | Writer(s) | Length |
|---|---|---|---|
| 1. | "The Ozzylot (Hidden in a Girl)" | Bent Sæther | 4:30 |
| 2. | "Riding the Tiger" | Hans Magnus Ryan, Sæther | 5:25 |
| 3. | "Whole Lotta Diana" | Kenneth Kapstad, Sæther | 8:57 |

Side B
| No. | Title | Writer(s) | Length |
|---|---|---|---|
| 1. | "Cornucopia (...Or Satan, Uh... Something)" | Ryan, Sæther | 6:24 |
| 2. | "Mr. Victim" | Ryan, Sæther | 4:17 |
| 3. | "The Waiting Game" | Sæther | 4:57 |
| 4. | "Child of the Future" | Sæther | 5:00 |

== Personnel ==
Motorpsycho:

- Bent Sæther – vocals, bass guitar, guitars, keyboards, etc.
- Hans Magnus Ryan – guitars, vocals, keyboards, etc.
- Kenneth Kapstad – drums

with:

- Larry Space (Lars Lien) – piano on "Cornucopia"
