= Håkon Gebhardt =

Norwegian musician and record producer

- Born: 21 June 1969 (age 57); Trondheim, Sør-Trøndelag
- Origin: Norway
- Genres: Rock, pop, country, folk
- Occupations: Musician, composer, record producer
- Instruments: Drums, banjo, guitar, vocals
- Website: https://www.facebook.com/dasbootstudio/

Håkon Gebhardt (born 21 June 1969 in Trondheim, Norway) is a Norwegian musician, multi-instrumentalist and record producer living in Trondheim.

== Career ==
Gebhardt developed his musical interests when he attended the Music program at Kongsbakken videregående skole and Trøndertun folkehøgskole. He is best known as the drummer in Motorpsycho (1991–2005). He has also released the album Gebhardt Plays with Himself (2000), and has been a member of the band HGH where he was mainly playing the banjo.

Gebhardt also plays banjo in The International Tussler Society and in Ida Jenshus Band. He has participated on numerous recordings by other artists, and plays acoustic guitar, banjo and choir on the album A Couple of Days in Larsville by Elisabeth Andreassen, banjo on the album Essensuell by Postgirobyggets and on the single Fem Flate Øre by the Norwegian hip hop band Fremmed Rase, and drums and banjo on several releases by the Norwegian pop group Monster Blomster. He has also co-produced the Åge Aleksandersen-album Snöharpan with Aleksandersen.

== Politics ==
In 2011 he was the last nominee on the list for the Norwegian environmental party Miljøpartiet De Grønne for the municipal elections in Trondheim. He was cumulated to be the first of the uncumulated, and thus deputy city council.

== Honors ==
- 1994: Spellemannprisen in the class Best album cover, for the album Timothy's Monster created by Kim Hiorthøy
- 1996: Spellemannprisen in the class Rock, for the album Blissard
- 1997: Spellemannprisen in the class Hard rock, for the album Angels and Daemons at Play
- 2000: Spellemannprisen in the class Rock, for the album Let Them Eat Cake

== Discography (in selection) ==
=== Solo albums ===
- 2000: Gebhardt Plays with Himself

As Gebhardt & Mjøs

- 2006: Alt For Norge(Apache Records)

=== Motorpsycho albums ===
- 1991: Lobotomizer (Voices of Wonder Records)
- 1992: 8 Soothing Songs For Rut (Voices of Wonder Records)
- 1993: Demon Box (Voices of Wonder Records)
- 1994: Timothy's Monster (Stickman Records)
- 1994: The Tussler (dBut)
- 1995: Blissard (Stickman Records)
- 1997: Angels and Daemons at Play (Stickman Records)
- 1998: Trust Us (Stickman Records)
- 2000: Let Them Eat Cake (Columbia)
- 2001: Phanerothyme (Columbia)
- 2002: It's A Love Cult (Stickman Records)

Live albums (Roadworks within Motorpsyco)

- 1999: Roadwork Vol. 1: Heavy Metall Iz A Poze, Hardt Rock Iz A Laifschteil (Stickman Records), live in Europe 1998
- 2000: Roadwork Vol. 2: The Motor Source Massacre (Stickman Records), with The Source & Deathprod live at Kongsberg Jazzfestival 1995

As Motorpsycho with Jaga Jazzist Horns

- 2003: In the Fishtank 10 (Mini-album)

As Motorpsycho & Friends

- 1994: The Tussler - Original Motion Picture Soundtrack

=== The International Tussler Society albums ===
- 2004: Motorpsycho presents The International Tussler Society
- 2004: Satans Favourite Son (Promo-single)
- 2004: Laila Lou (Promo-single)

=== Collaborative works ===
With "Monster Blomster»

- 1996: Alltids Noen Som Har Det Verre (Mons Records)
- 1996: Vanlig Normal (Mons Records)
- 1999: Stadig Flere Velger Feil (Mons Records)

With "Postgirobygget»

- 1997: Essensuell (Norske Gram)

With "Fremmed Rase»

- 2003: Pisspreik (Norwave)

With "Washington»

- 2004: A New Order Rising (Bauta Recordings)

With "Nagan»

- 2008: Crawl Piss Freeze (Osito Records)

With "O.S.A.»

- 2008: Øresus Og Nesegrus (MBN)

With "Sugarfoot»

- 2008: This Love That We Outwore (Crispin Glover Records)

With "Meg Og Kammeraten Min»

- 2012: Det E'kke Bra Før Det Er Dårlig
