= Black Hole/Blank Canvas =

Studio album by Motorpsycho
- Released: March 17, 2006
- Recorded: 2005
- Genres: Psychedelic rock, hard rock
- Length: 84:53
- Label: Stickman Records
- Producers: Motorpsycho, Pieter Kloos

Motorpsycho chronology
| In the Fishtank 10 (2003) | Black Hole/Blank Canvas (2006) | Little Lucid Moments (2008) |

Motorpsycho full chronology
| Motorpsycho Presents The International Tussler Society (2004) | Black Hole/Blank Canvas (2006) | Little Lucid Moments (2008) |

Black Hole/Blank Canvas is the eleventh full-length studio album by the Norwegian band Motorpsycho. It is the first after long-time drummer Håkon Gebhardt left the band in spring 2005. The other two members, Hans Magnus Ryan and Bent Sæther decided to carry on as a duo. They recorded their new album in The Void studio in Eindhoven together with producer/engineer and long-time live sound technician Pieter Kloos and produced their third double album. It was released on March 17, 2006, (March 20 in Norway) and was followed by a European tour in spring. The band was joined by drummer Jacco van Rooij and vibraphonist Øyvind Brandtsegg, who also played on the 1994 album Timothy's Monster.

The second song from the album, "In our Tree", was premiered as a short clip on Norwegian TV station NRK during the program Lydverket, and later in full on the radio station P3.

== Track listing ==
All tracks are written by Hans Magnus Ryan and Bent Sæther.

Disc one
| No. | Title | Length |
|---|---|---|
| 1. | "No Evil" | 6:06 |
| 2. | "In Our Tree" | 3:39 |
| 3. | "Coalmine Pony" | 3:17 |
| 4. | "Kill Devil Hills" | 7:18 |
| 5. | "Critical Mass" | 5:21 |
| 6. | "The 29th Bulletin" | 5:48 |
| 7. | "Devil Dog" | 4:24 |
| 8. | "Triggerman" | 6:14 |
| Total length: | | 42:11 |

Disc Two
| No. | Title | Length |
|---|---|---|
| 1. | "Hyena" | 4:01 |
| 2. | "Sancho Says" | 3:33 |
| 3. | "Sail On" | 4:17 |
| 4. | "The Ace" | 3:46 |
| 5. | "L.T.E.C. (Déjà-Vulture Blues)" | 6:19 |
| 6. | "You Lose" | 5:32 |
| 7. | "Before the Flood" | 8:58 |
| 8. | "Fury on Earth" | 2:49 |
| 9. | "With Trixeene Through The Mirror, I Dream With Open Eyes" | 3:31 |
| Total length: | | 42:51 |

- There also exists a special edition available via Amazon.com and the Stickman Records mail order with an additional disc containing a single edit of "Hyena" and the non-album track "Bonny Lee" (Sæther).

== Personnel ==
- Bent Sæther: vocals, bass, guitars, keyboards, drums etc.
- Hans Magnus Ryan: guitars, vocals, keyboards etc.

with:

- Jacco van Rooij (former 35007, 7 Zuma 7 and currently Suimasen): drums on "You Lose"
- Kim Hiorthøy: cover artwork

== Editions ==
The vinyl edition omits coloring and comes completely in black and white.

- The album was also released as a special edition (book-like packaging) and an extra special edition containing a bonus disc, which was only available via Amazon.com and the Stickman Records mailorder.
