= The Tussler – Original Motion Picture Soundtrack =

The Tussler - Original Motion Picture Soundtrack

Studio album by Motorpsycho & Friends
- Released: 1994 (CD); 1996 (vinyl); 2003 (remaster)
- Recorded: 1993; 1995 (bonus tracks)
- Genre: Country rock
- Length: 33:23 (original); 47:23 (1996 vinyl); 79:12 (remaster)
- Label: Stickman Records
- Producer: Motorpsycho (original); The International Tussler Society (bonus tracks)

Motorpsycho & Friends chronology
The Tussler - Original Motion Picture Soundtrack (1994)	Motorpsycho presents The International Tussler Society (2004)

Motorpsycho full chronology
Demon Box (1993)	The Tussler – Original Motion Picture Soundtrack (1994)	Timothy's Monster (1994)

The Tussler – Original Motion Picture Soundtrack is the first album by Motorpsycho & Friends, released in 1994. The album was the soundtrack to a fictional Spaghetti Western by non-existent director Theo Buhara. Its Country Rock sound marked a drastic departure from the earlier Motorpsycho records, which were hard-rocking.

Originally released only on CD in 1994 in two very limited editions, it was re-released in 1996 as a double 10" vinyl, after the band, now calling themselves The International Tussler Society, got together again to record some new material in (supposedly) late summer 1995. From these sessions, four songs were included as bonus tracks on the vinyl reissue.

After a long hiatus, the I.T.S. regrouped in 2002 to play some gigs and decided to remaster the original album, which had become a sought-after rarity in the Motorpsycho catalogue. It was finally released in 2003 in its definitive form including all songs from the 1995 sessions.

== Track listing ==
=== Original CD edition (1994) ===
No.	Title	Writer(s)	Length
1.	"Theme trom the Tussler"	Håkon Gebhardt	1:40
2.	"Six Days on the Road"	Earl Green, Carl Montgomery	2:59
3.	"Frances"	Hans Magnus Ryan, Bent Sæther	2:14
4.	"Babylon"	Sæther	3:53
5.	"I Know You Rider"	traditional	3:56
6.	"Hogwash"	Sæther	3:02
7.	"The Tussler (Slight Return)"	Gebhardt	0:26
8.	"Sonnyboy Gaybar"	Gebhardt, Lars Lien, Ryan, Sæther	1:37
9.	"Sunchild"	Sæther	5:28
10.	"Waiting for the One"	Sæther	3:04
11.	"A Memory"	Ryan, Sæther	5:04
Total length:			33:28

=== 2 x 10" vinyl edition (1996) ===
Side A:

1. "Theme from the Tussler"
2. "Six Days on the Road"
3. "Frances"
4. "Babylon"

Side B:

1. "I Know You Rider"
2. "Hogwash"
3. "The Tussler (Slight Return)"
4. "Sunchild"

Side C:

1. "Sonnyboy Gaybar"
2. "Waiting for the One"
3. "A Memory"

Side D:

1. "Polka with the Devil" (Gebhardt, Sæther) – 3:50
2. "Lazy Days" (Gram Parsons) – 2:45
3. "Changes" (Kjell Karlsen) – 2:59
4. "Albuquerque" (Neil Young) – 4:26

=== Remastered CD edition (2003) ===
Tracks 1–11 as 1994 CD edition, above
No.	Title	Writer(s)	Length
12.	"Polka with the Devil"	Gebhardt, Sæther	3:50
13.	"Lazy Days"	Parsons	2:45
14.	"Changes"	Karlsen	2:59
15.	"Albuquerque"	Young	4:26
16.	"Bird Song"	Jerry Garcia, Robert Hunter	8:56
17.	"One More Saturday Night"	Bob Weir	4:18
18.	"With Care from Someone"	Gene Clark, Doug Dillard, Bernie Leadon	3:41
19.	"Queen Chinee"	Ryan, Sæther	2:28
20.	"Illinois"	Ryan, Sæther, Matt Burt	6:52
21.	"It Must Have Been the Roses"	Hunter	5:34
Total length:			79:24

Note: Tracks 12–15 previously released on 1996 vinyl edition; 16–21 previously unreleased.

=== Remastered 2 x 12" vinyl edition (2003) ===
Side A:

1. "Theme from the Tussler"
2. "Six Days on the Road"
3. "Frances"
4. "Babylon"
5. "I Know You Rider"
6. "Hogwash"
7. "The Tussler (Slight Return)"
8. "Sonnyboy Gaybar"

Side B:

1. "Sunchild"
2. "Waiting for the One"
3. "A Memory"
4. "Polka with the Devil"
5. "Lazy Days"

Side C:

1. "Changes"
2. "Albuquerque"
3. "Bird Song"
4. "One More Saturday Night"

Side D:

1. "With Care from Someone"
2. "Queen Chinee"
3. "Illinois"
4. "It Must Have Been the Roses"

== Personnel ==
- Barry "Space" Hillien (Lars Lien) – lead vocals (2, 3, 4, 6, 9, 10, 11, 13, 16, 20, 21), keyboards, bass
- Kjell "K.K." Karlsen – pedal steel guitar, lead vocals (14)
- Duellin' Flint Gebhardt (Håkon Gebhardt) – banjo, electric & acoustic guitar
- Chickenshakin' Lolly Hanks Jr. (Morten Fagervik) – drums, vocals, harmonica, percussion
- Snakebite Ryan (Hans Magnus Ryan) – electric & acoustic guitars, violin, mandolin, recorder, vocals
- Charlie Bob Bent (Bent Sæther) – lead vocals (5, 8, 12, 15, 17–19), bass, acoustic & electric guitars, mandolin

with:

- Chris (a local (female) hairdresser) – second lead vocal (9)
