= 8 Soothing Songs for Rut =

Studio album by Motorpsycho
- Released: 1992
- Recorded: January and July, 1992
- Genre: Grunge, stoner rock
- Length: 42:04
- Label: Voices of Wonder
- Producer: Motorpsycho

Motorpsycho chronology
Lobotomizer (1991)	8 Soothing Songs for Rut (1992)	Demon Box (1993)

8 Soothing Songs for Rut is the second studio album by the Norwegian rock band Motorpsycho, then still tinged in hard rock and grunge metal. It was first released as vinyl-only-mini-album called "Soothe" but later re-released on CD with two additional tracks from the single "3 Songs For Rut". Both titles were merged into "8 Soothing Songs For Rut". The music is very raw and hard, but also shows glimpses of Prog, as in the nearly 10-minute-long "Lighthouse Girl".

== Track listing ==
=== CD ===
No.	Title	Writer(s)	Length
1.	"Have Fun"	Bent Sæther	3:48
2.	"Loaded"	Håkon Gebhardt, Hans Magnus Ryan, Sæther	2:50
3.	"Lighthouse Girl"	Sæther, Ryan	9:23
4.	"Sister Confusion"	Sæther	5:53
5.	"The Wait"	Sæther	6:41
6.	"Step Inside"	Sæther, Ryan	7:11
7.	"We All Float Down Here Too!"	Gebhardt, Ryan, Sæther	1:06
8.	"California Dreamin'"	John Phillips, Michelle Phillips	5:07

=== LP "Soothe" ===
Side A (45 rpm)
No.	Title	Length
1.	"Lighthouse Girl"	9:23

Side B (33 rpm)
No.	Title	Length
1.	"Sister Confusion"	5:53
2.	"The Wait"	6:41
3.	"Step Inside"	7:11
4.	"We All Float Down Here!"	1:06
5.	"California Dreamin'"	5:07

== Personnel ==
- Bent Sæther: vocals, bass, guitars, piano, percussion
- Hans Magnus Ryan: guitars, taurus, piano, back. vocals
- Håkon Gebhardt: drums, percussion

with:

- Lars Lien: back. vocals on "California Dreamin'"
