= The International Tussler Society =

The International Tussler Society is a country rock-band from Trondheim, Norway, formed in 1993.

They started out as a side-project of fellow Trondheimers, Motorpsycho, who decided to record a country-album when their drummer, Håkon Gebhardt, bought a banjo. Their line-up got extended and the story had its beginning. The first album was released (and subsequently became a rarity, as it was pressed in low amounts) and the band played several concerts.

Later on, the International Tussler Society, as the project was named, developed a life of its own, aside from the Motorpsycho-universe. Despite the long gaps between recordings and tours, the band can still be seen as standing on its own feet. They derive their musical style from Country/Southern rock-veterans such as The Byrds, The Grateful Dead, The International Submarine Band, The Band, The Allman Brothers Band, Neil Young and The Flying Burrito Brothers. Like the Grateful Dead and the Allman Brothers Band, they also have had two drummers since 2003, when Even Granås joined them. They are also known for playing very long sets which include intense jamming, most of the 2004 tour-concerts lasted around three hours.

The I.T.S. have recorded two albums, The Tussler - Original Motion Picture Soundtrack (1994, re-released in 1996 and 2003) and Motorpsycho presents The International Tussler Society (2004).

== Members ==
- Barry "Space" Hillien (Lars Lien): lead vocals, keyboards
- Kjell "K.K." Karlsen: pedal steel guitar, occasional lead vocals
- Duellin' Flint Gebhardt (Håkon Gebhardt): banjo
- Chickenshakin' Lolly Hanks Jr. (Morten Fagervik): drums
- Snakebite Ryan (Hans Magnus Ryan): guitars, vocals
- Charlie Bob Bent (Bent Sæther): bass, guitars, occasional lead vocals
- Ringo "Fire" Karlsen AKA The Kid (Even Granås): drums (since 2003)
