= Still Life with Eggplant =

Still Life With Eggplant

Studio album by Motorpsycho
- Released: April 12, 2013
- Recorded: 2012
- Genre: Psychedelic rock, progressive rock, alternative rock
- Length: 45:05
- Label: Stickman Records; Rune Grammofon
- Producer: Bent Sæther

Motorpsycho chronology
The Death Defying Unicorn (2012)	Still Life With Eggplant (2013)	Behind the Sun (2014)

Still Life With Eggplant is the sixteenth album by Motorpsycho, released on April 12, 2013 via Stickman Records and Rune Grammofon. The title is the same as one painting of Henri Matisse and one fictional painting appearing in the third episode of the third season of the television series Jeeves and Wooster.

== Track listing ==
No.	Title	Writer(s)	Length
1.	"Hell, Part 1-3"	Kenneth Kapstad, Hans Magnus Ryan, Bent Sæther	9:47
2.	"August"	Arthur Lee	4:52
3.	"Barleycorn (Let It Come/Let It Be)"	Sæther	7:18
4.	"Ratcatcher"	Kapstad, Ryan, Sæther	17:10
5.	"The Afterglow"	Ryan, Sæther	5:58

== Personnel ==
- Bent Sæther – vocals, bass, guitars, keyboards
- Hans Magnus Ryan – vocals, guitars, keyboards
- Kenneth Kapstad – drums

with:

- Reine Fiske – electric & acoustic guitars on tracks 2–5, mellotron on track 5
- Thomas Henriksen – keyboards on track 3
