= The Death Defying Unicorn =

Studio album by Motorpsycho & Ståle Storløkken
- Released: 10 February 2012
- Recorded: 2011
- Genre: Progressive rock
- Length: 83:44
- Label: Stickman Records; Rune Grammofon
- Producer: Kåre Christoffer Vestrheim & Bent Sæther

Motorpsycho & Ståle Storløkken chronology
Heavy Metal Fruit (2010)	The Death Defying Unicorn (2012)	Still Life with Eggplant (2013)

The Death Defying Unicorn is the fifteenth full-length studio album by the Norwegian band Motorpsycho, released on 10 February 2012 via Rune Grammofon and Stickman Records. It was released on double CD and double 12" vinyl. It is a collaboration with Ståle Storløkken, and also features Ola Kvernberg, Trondheimsolistene and the Trondheim Jazz Orchestra.

== Track listing ==
=== Compact disc ===
Disc one
No.	Title	Writer(s)	Length
1.	"Out of the Woods"	Ståle Storløkken	2:40
2.	"The Hollow Lands"	Bent Sæther	7:36
3.	"Through the Veil (parts I & II)"	Hans Magnus Ryan, Sæther, Storløkken	16:01
4.	"Doldrums"	Storløkken	3:06
5.	"Into the Gyre"	Ryan, Sæther	10:22
6.	"Flotsam"	Storløkken	1:33
Total length:			41:21

Disc two
No.	Title	Writer(s)	Length
1.	"Oh, Proteus - A Prayer"	Ryan, Sæther, Storløkken	7:35
2.	"Sculls in Limbo"	Ryan	2:21
3.	"La Lethe"	Storløkken, Sæther	7:53
4.	"Oh, Proteus - A Lament"	Ryan, Sæther, Storløkken	1:04
5.	"Sharks"	Ryan, Sæther, Storløkken	7:56
6.	"Mutiny!"	Ryan, Sæther	8:33
7.	"Into the Mystic"	Sæther	7:04
Total length:			42:29

=== Vinyl ===
Side A:

1. Out of the Woods
2. The Hollow Lands
3. Through the Veil, Part I

Side B:

1. Through the Veil, Part II
2. Doldrums
3. Into the gyre
4. Flotsam

Side C:

1. Oh, Proteus - A Prayer
2. Sculls in Limbo
3. La Lethe
4. Oh, Proteus - A Lament

Side D:

1. Sharks
2. Mutiny!
3. Into the Mystic

== Credits ==
Music arranged by Motorpsycho and Ståle Storløkken
Words by Bent Sæther
Trondheimsolistene and the Trondheim Jazz Orchestra arranged by Ståle Storløkken

Performed by Motorpsycho:
Kenneth Kapstad – drums
Hans Magnus Ryan – guitars and vocals
Bent Sæther – bass and vocals
and
Ståle Storløkken – keyboards

featuring
Ola Kvernberg – violin
Kåre Chr. Vestrheim – mellotron, various sonic mayhem, gongs and other canned goods of the viennese persuasion

with
Trondheim Jazz Orchestra
Kjetil Traavik Møster – clarinet, tenor & baritone saxophones
Hanna Paulsberg – tenor saxophone
Klaus Ellerhusen Holm – alto saxophone
Andre Roligheten – tenor saxophone, bass clarinet
Mathias Eick, Eivind Nordseth Lønning – trumpets
Mats Äleklint, Kristoffer Kompen – trombones

Trondheimsolistene
Daniel Turcina, Åse Våg Aaknes, Sigrid Stang, Stina Andersson – violins
Frøydis Tøsse, Lars Marius Hølås – violas
Marianne Lie, Tabita Berglund – cellos
