= Heavy Metal Fruit =

Studio album by Motorpsycho
- Released: January 18, 2010
- Recorded: 2009
- Genre: Psychedelic rock, progressive rock, alternative rock
- Length: 62:05
- Label: Stickman Records; Rune Grammofon
- Producer: Kåre Christoffer Vestrheim & Bent Sæther

Motorpsycho chronology
Child of the Future (2009)	Heavy Metal Fruit (2010)	The Death Defying Unicorn (2012)

Heavy Metal Fruit is the fourteenth full-length studio album by the Norwegian band Motorpsycho, released on January 18, 2010, via Rune Grammofon and Stickman Records. It was released on CD and vinyl and is their third album over the course of the last two years.

== Track listing ==
No.	Title	Writer(s)	Length
1.	"Starhammer (feat. The Electric Psalmon)"	Hans Magnus Ryan, Bent Sæther	12:57
2.	"X-3 (Knuckleheads in Space) / The Getaway Special"	Sæther / Kenneth Kapstad, Ryan, Sæther	9:03
3.	"The Bomb-Proof Roll and Beyond (for Arnie Hassle)"	Ryan, Sæther	6:01
4.	"Close Your Eyes"	Sæther	3:39
5.	"W.B.A.T."	Sæther	9:43
6.	"Gullible's Travails (pt. I - IV)"; I. "Eye All-Seeing"; II. "The Elementhaler"; III. "Circle"; IV. "Phoot's Flower (a Burly Return)"	Ryan, Sæther	20:42

== Personnel ==
Motorpsycho:

- Bent Sæther – vocals, bass, guitars, keyboards
- Hans Magnus Ryan – vocals, guitars, keyboards
- Kenneth Kapstad – drums

with:

- Kåre Christoffer Vestrheim – keyboards, producer, engineer, mixing
- Hanne Hukkelberg – vocals on tracks 2, 4, 5, 6
- Mathias Eick – trumpet on track 2
- Mike Hartung – engineer, mixing
