= Baard Slagsvold =

Norwegian pop and jazz musician (born 1963)

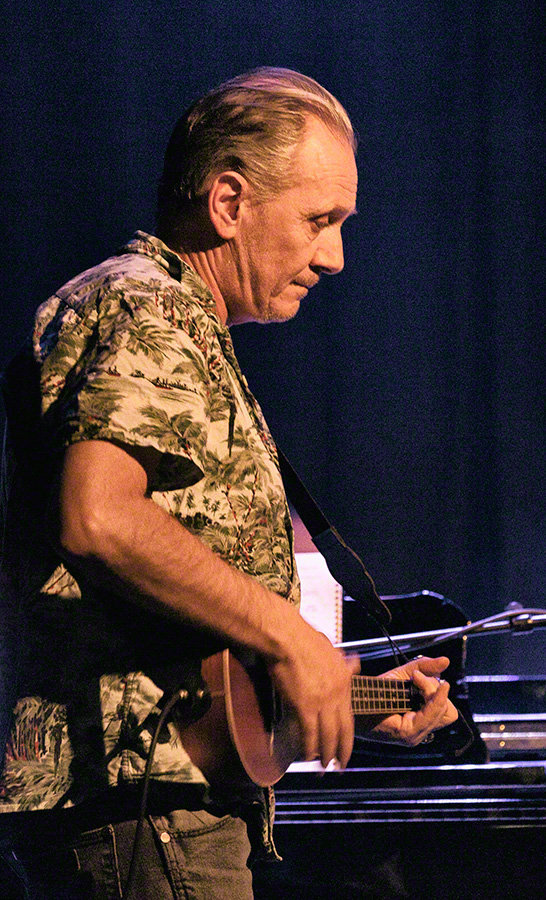
- Slagsvold at a concert at Cosmopolite Scene in 2016

Background information
- Born: Baard Henrik Slagsvold; 31 August 1963 (age 62); Elverum, Hedmark, Norway
- Genres: Jazz
- Occupations: Musician, composer
- Instruments: Vocals, piano, double bass, drums
- Website: Baard Slagsvold on Myspace

Baard Henrik Slagsvold (born 31 August 1963 in Elverum, Norway) is a Norwegian pop and jazz musician (vocals, piano, double bass and drums), and are particularly known as the bassist and singer in the pop trio Tre Små Kinesere (1989–2005).

== Career ==
Slagsvold had sung and played in several bands before he joined the "Tre Små Kinesere", including "Fort & Gæli" and "Appelzin Juice Studentz" from Elverum, and he also vas vocalist and played drums in the band "Skjønn Forening" from Oslo, and "Kaare og partiet". He attended the Jazz program at Trondheim Musikkonsevatorium, with the piano as main instrument, but started the double bass within "Tre Små Kinesere", because Øystein Hegge already was the pianist.

Slagsvold has also played with the rock band "Motorpsycho" from Trondheim, the pop trio "Skrujern", started in 1994, and within "Norsk Utflukt" where he primarily played the piano and bass, with the author Lars Saabye Christensen as vocalist. He was also co-composer together with Kåre Virud, in "Norsk Utflukt", while also playing in "Kåre Virud Band". Slagsvold has also been a studio musician and performed within his own Baard Slagsvold Quartet.

== Discography ==
Within Skjønn Forening

- 1985: Livsskvadroner (Bring Back Beat Records)

Within Tre Små Kinesere

- 1990: 365 Fri (CBS)
- 1991: Luftpalass (CBS, Columbia)
- 1992: Vær Sær (Sony Music Entertainment, Norway)
- 2002: De Aller Beste Fra Tre Små Kinesere (Columbia)

Within Motorpsycho

- 1999: Let Them Eat Cake (Stickman Records, Germany)
- 2000: Walkin' With J (Stickman Records, Germany)
- 2001: Barracuda (Stickman Records, Germany)
- 2001: Phanerothyme (Columbia)
- 2002: It's A Love Cult (Stickman Records, Germany)
- 2002: In The Fishtank (Konkurrent Records), with Jaga Jazzist Horns

Within Norsk Utflukt

- 2008: Med Lyset På (Grammofon)

With other projects

- 1995: Katzenjammer Für Frauentimmer (Hund Productions Int.), with "Schweinhund»
- 1999: Bønder I Solnedgang (Norske Gram), with Hans Rotmo & "Skrujern»
- 2005: Det Beste Til Meg Og Mine Venner (JEPS, Big Dipper Records), a tribute to Joachim Nielsen
