= Let Them Eat Cake (album) =

Studio album by Motorpsycho
- Released: February 2000
- Recorded: 1999
- Genre: Rock
- Length: 45:36
- Label: Sony (Norway); Stickman (Europe)
- Producer: Motorpsycho, Deathprod

Motorpsycho chronology
Trust Us (1998)	Let Them Eat Cake (2000)	Phanerothyme (2001)

Let Them Eat Cake is the eighth full-length studio album by the Norwegian rock-band Motorpsycho. Released early in 2000, the album showed the band taking steps in a new direction, leaning more towards jazz and psychedelia than the heavy indie rock guitars the band was famous for.

The EP "The Other Fool" reached nr. 1 on VGs singles-list.

== Track listing ==
No.	Title	Written by	Length
1.	"The Other Fool"	Sæther	5:40
2.	"Upstairs-Downstairs"	Ryan	5:12
3.	"Big Surprise"	Sæther	3:36
4.	"Walkin With J."	Gebhardt/Sæther	3:59
5.	"Never Let You Out"	Gebhardt	2:46
6.	"Whip That Ghost (Song for a Bro')"	Sæther	6:30
7.	"Stained Glass"	Sæther	6:12
8.	"My Best Friend"	Ryan/Sæther	4:21
9.	"30/30"	Sæther	7:21
Total length:			45:37

== LP track listing ==
Side A
No.	Title	Written by	Length
1.	"The Other Fool"	Sæther	5:40
2.	"Upstairs-Downstairs"	Ryan	5:12
3.	"Big Surprise"	Sæther	3:36
4.	"Walkin With J."	Gebhardt/Sæther	3:59
5.	"Never Let You Out"	Gebhardt	2:46

Side B
No.	Title	Written by	Length
6.	"Whip That Ghost (Song for a Bro')"	Sæther	6:30
7.	"Stained Glass"	Sæther	6:12
8.	"My Best Friend"	Ryan/Sæther	4:21
9.	"30/30"	Sæther	7:21
Total length:			45:37

== Personnel ==
- Bent Sæther: Vocals, bass, guitars, drums, percussion, Rhodes piano, wood blocks, Minimoog, piano, harmonium
- Hans Magnus Ryan: Guitars, vocals, clavinet, double bass, violins, mandolin
- Håkon Gebhardt: Drums, vocals, percussion, zither, guitars, piano

with

- Helge Sten (Deathprod): drum machine
- Baard Slagsvold: Piano, Rhodes piano, back. vocals
- Ole Henrik Moe (Ohm): Violins, gong
- Kristin Karlsson: violin
- Kristin Skjølaas: violin
- Einy Langmoen: viola
- Kjersti Rydsaa: cello
- Arne Frang: tenor saxophone
- Jørgen Gjerde: trombone
- Erlend Gjerde: trumpet
- Helge Sunde: trombone
- Tone Reichelt: waldhorn
- Arve Henriksen: trumpet, mellophone
