= Behind the Sun (Motorpsycho album) =

Studio album by Motorpsycho
- Released: March 7, 2014
- Recorded: 2012–2013
- Length: 60:40 (CD, download); 68:20 (vinyl)
- Labels: Stickman Records; Rune Grammofon
- Producer: Bent Sæther

Motorpsycho chronology
Still Life with Eggplant (2013)	Behind the Sun (2014)	The Motorpnakotic Fragments (2014)

Behind the Sun ratings
Review scores
Source	Rating
Louder Sound	3.5/5 stars

Behind the Sun is an album by Motorpsycho, released on March 7, 2014 via Stickman Records and Rune Grammofon. It was released as a double 12" vinyl record, CD, as well as digital download. Side A of the vinyl version features two instrumental tracks, cut in parallel (the needle will randomly play one of the two songs). Since this side was marketed as featuring an "etching", these instrumentals are considered hidden tracks. It was the second album recorded with Reine Fiske on second guitar, who joined the band for recordings and touring in 2012. It also saw the return of Ole Henrik "Ohm" Moe, who collaborated frequently with the band in the late 1990s.

== Track listing ==
CD & digital

No.	Title	Writer(s)	Length
1.	"Cloudwalker (a darker blue)"	Bent Sæther	6:06
2.	"Ghost"	Sæther	6:38
3.	"On a Plate"	Hans Magnus Ryan, Sæther	4:09
4.	"The Promise"	Ryan, Sæther	4:40
5.	"Kvæstor (incl. Where Greyhounds Dare)"	Kenneth Kapstad, Ryan, Sæther	7:09
6.	"Hell, part 4-6: Traitor / The Tapestry / Swiss Cheese Mountain"	Ryan, Sæther	12:21
7.	"Entropy"	Sæther	7:23
8.	"The Magic & The Wonder (A Love Theme)"	Sæther	4:41
9.	"Hell, part 7: Victim of Rock"	Kapstad, Ryan, Sæther	7:36

Vinyl

Side A:

1. Instrumental 1 – 3:58
2. Instrumental 2 – 3:42

Side B

1. Cloudwalker (a darker blue)
2. Ghost
3. On a Plate
4. The Promise

Side C

1. Kvæstor (incl. Where Greyhounds Dare)
2. Hell, part 4-6: Traitor/The Tapestry/Swiss Cheese Mountain

Side D

1. Entropy
2. The Magic & The Wonder (A Love Theme)
3. Hell, part 7: Victim of Rock

Note: CD and digital download versions omit the Side A tracks. Authors of the instrumental tracks are not mentioned on the record sleeve.

== Personnel ==
- Bent Sæther – vocals, bass, 12- & 6-string acoustic and electric guitars, Mellotrons, percussion
- Hans Magnus Ryan – vocals, electric and acoustic guitars
- Kenneth Kapstad – drums

with:

- Reine Fiske – electric and acoustic guitars, Mellotron (present on all tracks except "The Promise")
- Thomas Henriksen – piano (on "The Magic & The Wonder")
- Ole Henrik Moe: saw (on "Cloudwalker"), viola (on "Ghost" and "Kvæstor")
- Kari Rønnekleiv: violin (on "Ghost" and "Kvæstor")
