= Sæther =

Sæther is a Norwegian surname. Notable people with the surname include:

- Andrine Sæther (born 1964), Norwegian actress
- Bjarne Berg-Sæther (1919–2009), Norwegian politician for the Labour Party
- Gjøran Sæther (born 1982), Norwegian artist and painter
- Harald Sæther (born 1946), Norwegian composer
- Jan Valentin Sæther (1944–2018), Norwegian figurative painter, sculptor and Gnosticism priest
- Morten Sæther (born 1959), Norwegian cyclist
- Ole Sæther (1870-1946), Norwegian rifle shooter
- Ole A. Sæther (1936-2013), Norwegian entomologist
- Olaf Sæther (1872-1945), Norwegian rifle shooter
- Peder Sæther (1810-1886), Norwegian-American banker
- Svein Ole Sæther (born 1948), Norwegian diplomat
- Wera Sæther (born 1945), Norwegian psychologist and writer
