= Motorpsycho Presents The International Tussler Society =

Motorpsycho presents The International Tussler Society

Studio album by The International Tussler Society
- Released: September 2004
- Recorded: winter/spring 2004
- Genre: Country rock
- Length: 50:05
- Label: Stickman Records
- Producer: The International Tussler Society

The International Tussler Society chronology
The Tussler - Original Motion Picture Soundtrack (1994)	Motorpsycho presents The International Tussler Society (2004)

Motorpsycho full chronology
In the Fishtank 10 (2003)	Motorpsycho Presents The International Tussler Society (2004)	Black Hole/Blank Canvas (2006)

Professional ratings
Review scores
Source	Rating
The Independent	3/5 stars

Motorpsycho presents The International Tussler Society is an album by The International Tussler Society. It was released on CD and double vinyl, both editions came with a bonus DVD featuring a documentary about the recording process of the album, made by local director Frode Dreier. Also featured was the promotional video for "Satan's favourite Son". This song and "Laila Lou" were also given to radio stations as promo singles, but not released publicly.

To promote the album, the band toured Europe in fall 2004.

== Track listing ==
All tracks are written by Bent Sæther, except as noted.

No.	Title	Writer(s)	Length
1.	"Highway Zen"		3:58
2.	"That Ol' White Line"	Lars Lien, Sæther	3:12
3.	"The West Ain't What It Used to Be"		5:05
4.	"September"	Lien, Sæther	4:49
5.	"Satan's Favourite Son"		3:55
6.	"Laila Lou"		3:41
7.	"Back in Your Bed"		3:41
8.	"When We Were One"		2:06
9.	"Shitbox Ford"		3:06
10.	"Morning Rain"	Håkon Gebhardt, Mark Gregory	5:08
11.	"The Skies Are Full of ...Wine?"	Gebhardt, Sæther	4:57
12.	"Cassie (Call on Me)"		6:25

Vinyl edition

- Side A: 1-4
- Side B: 5-9
- Side C: 10-12
- Side D: etching by Doc Wör Mirran

== Personnel ==
- Barry "Space" Hillien (Lars Lien) – lead vocal (1–8, 12), keyboards, backing vocals
- Kjell "K.K." Karlsen – pedal steel guitar, backing vocals; lead vocal (9)
- Duellin' Flint Gebhardt (Håkon Gebhardt) – banjo, guitars, backing vocals; lead vocal (10)
- Chickenshakin' Lolly Hanks Jr. (Morten Fagervik) – drums, percussion; bass (8)
- Ringo "Fire" Karlsen, a.k.a. The Kid (Even Granås) – drums, percussion, acoustic guitar, backing vocals
- Snakebite Ryan (Hans Magnus Ryan) – electric & acoustic guitars, mandolin, backing vocals
- Charlie Bob Bent (Bent Sæther) – bass, acoustic & electric guitars, percussion, backing vocals; drums (5), lead vocal (11)
- Laila Lou Hillien (Lars Lien's dog) – good vibes and vocals (6)
