= Bent Sæther =

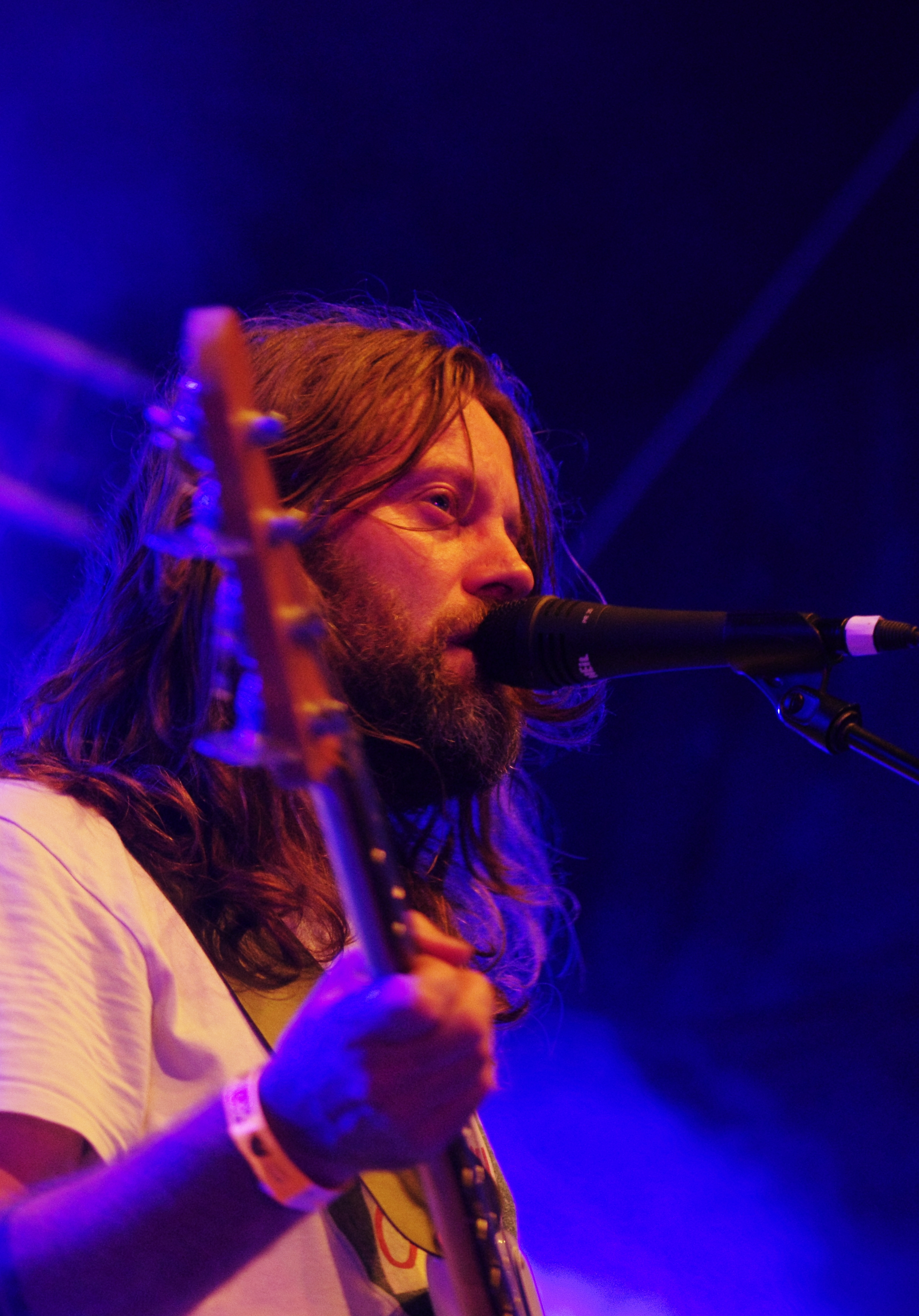
- Sæther with Motorpsycho live at Krach Am Bach 2013.

Background information
- Born: 18 February 1969 (age 57); Oslo
- Origin: Norway
- Genres: Rock
- Occupations: Musician, composer, producer
- Instruments: Multi instrumentalist, vocalist
- Website: www.uberrock.co.uk/interviews/62-november-interviews/1659-bent-saether-motorpsycho-interview-exclusive.html

Bent Sæther (born 18 February 1969) is the bass guitarist and lead vocalist of the Norwegian psychedelic rock band Motorpsycho from the start in 1989.

== Background ==
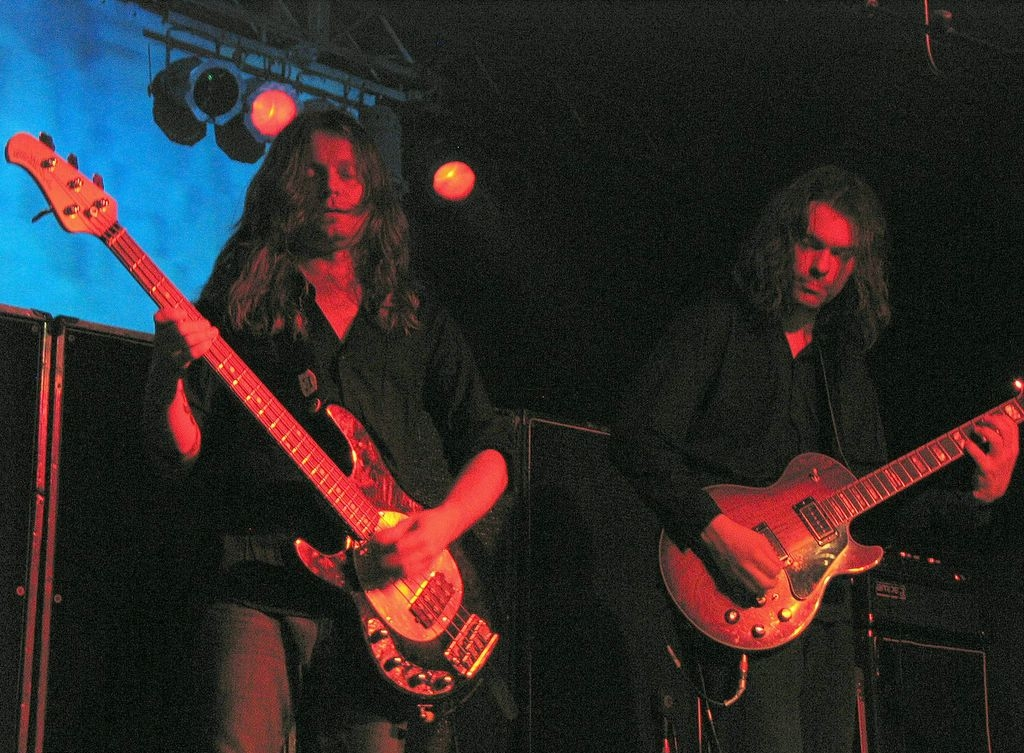
Sæther and Ryan with Motorpsycho.

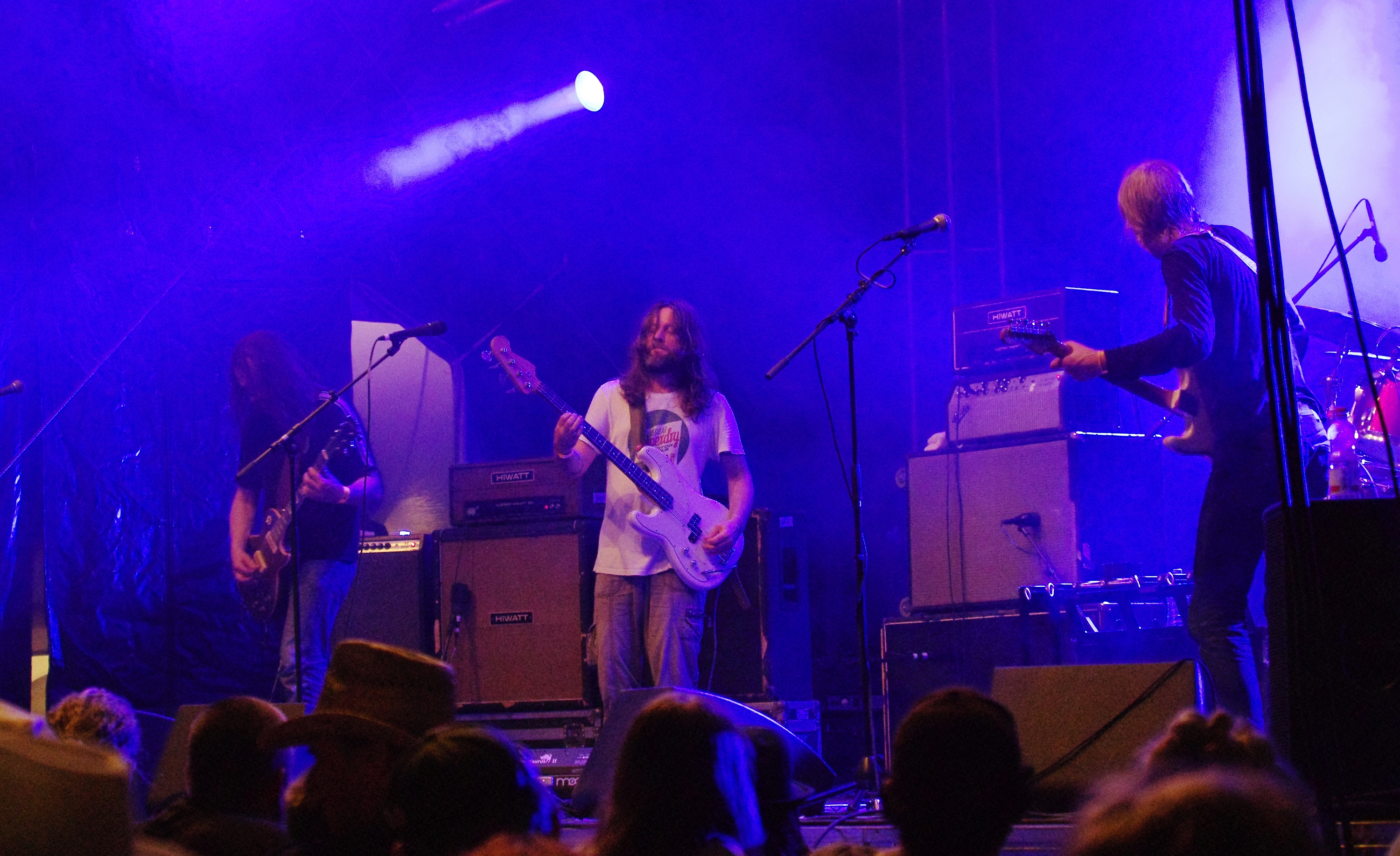
Hans Magnus Ryan, Sæther and Reine Fiske with Motorpsycho liveKrach Am Bach 2013.

Sæther grew up in an apartment complex in Ammerud before moving to the more rural Ski, and to the family farm in Snåsa in Nord-Trøndelag at ten. He went to high school in Steinkjer, and attended the Norges Teknisk-Naturvitenskapelige Universitet in Trondheim, taking university courses in English and Social anthropology completing the former.

== Career ==
In 1989 he started Motorpsycho with Hans Magnus Ryan and Kjell Runar "Killer" Jenssen. He also started the country rock band The International Tussler Society in 1993. 2012 saw Bent Sæther as producer for three Norwegian records, two of which are considered two of Norway's "four great" rock bands; deLillos' Vi er på vei, vi kanke snu and DumDum Boys Ti Liv. In addition, he produced the self-titled debut album of the country rock band The South.

== Honors ==
- Spellemannprisen 1996 in the class Rock, within Motorpsycho for the album Blissard
- Spellemannprisen 1997 in the class Hardrock, within Motorpsycho for the album Angels and Daemons at Play
- Spellemannprisen 2000 in the class Rock, within Motorpsycho for the album Let Them Eat Cake
- Edvard Prize 2010 for the album Child of the Future

== Discography ==
=== Motorpsycho albums ===
- 1991: Lobotomizer (Voices of Wonder Records)
- 1992: 8 Soothing Songs For Rut (Voices of Wonder Records)
- 1993: Demon Box (Voices of Wonder Records)
- 1994: Timothy's Monster (Stickman Records)
- 1994: The Tussler (dBut)
- 1995: Blissard (Stickman Records)
- 1997: Angels and Daemons at Play (Stickman Records)
- 1998: Trust Us (Stickman Records)
- 2000: Let Them Eat Cake (Columbia)
- 2001: Phanerothyme (Columbia)
- 2002: It's A Love Cult (Stickman Records)
- 2006: Black Hole/Blank Canvas
- 2008: Little Lucid Moments
- 2009: Child of the Future
- 2010: Heavy Metal Fruit
- 2013: Still Life With Eggplant
- 2014: Behind the Sun
- 2016: Here Be Monsters
- 2017: The Tower
- 2019: The Crucible
- 2020: The All Is One
- 2021: Kingdom of Oblivion
- 2022 Ancient Astronauts

=== As Motorpsycho & Friends ===
- 1994: The Tussler - Original Motion Picture Soundtrack

=== As Motorpsycho & Ståle Storløkken ===
- 2012: The Death Defying Unicorn
- 2015: En Konsert For Folk Flest

=== As The International Tussler Society ===
- 2004: Motorpsycho presents The International Tussler Society
- 2004: Satans Favourite Son (Promo-single)
- 2004: Laila Lou (Promo-single)

=== Live albums (Roadworks) ===
- 1999: Roadwork Vol. 1: Heavy Metall Iz A Poze, Hardt Rock Iz A Laifschteil (Stickman Records), live in Europe 1998
- 2000: Roadwork Vol. 2: The Motor Source Massacre (Stickman Records), with The Source & Deathprod live at Kongsberg Jazzfestival 1995
- 2008: Roadwork Vol. 3: The Four Norsemen of the Apocalypse (included in the double DVD release "Haircuts")
- 2011: Roadwork Vol. 4: Intrepid Skronk
- 2011: Strings of Stroop – Motorpsycho Live at Effenaar (limited edition vinyl)
- 2018: Roadwork Vol. 5: Field Notes - The Fantastic Expedition of Järmyr, Ryan, Sæther & Lo (Rune Grammofon), live in Europe 2017

=== Collaborations ===
- 1993: Into The Sun (Split 7"/CD-single with Hedge Hog)
- 2001: Go To California (Split-EP with The Soundtrack of Our Lives)
- 2003: In the Fishtank 10 (Mini-album with Jaga Jazzist Horns)
- 2005: Det Beste Til Meg Og Mine Venner (JEPS, Big Dipper Records), a tribute to Joachim Nielsen
- 2009: Blood From A Stone (Nettwerk), with Hanne Hukkelberg
