= Deathprod =

Norwegian musician (born 1971)

- Born: Helge Sten; 26 January 1971 (age 55); Røros Municipality, Norway
- Genres: Dark ambient, drone, ambient
- Occupation: Record producer
- Instruments: Magnetic tape machines, theremin, sampler, various homemade electronics, guitar
- Years active: 1991–present
- Labels: Rune Grammofon, dBUT Records, Metal Art Disco

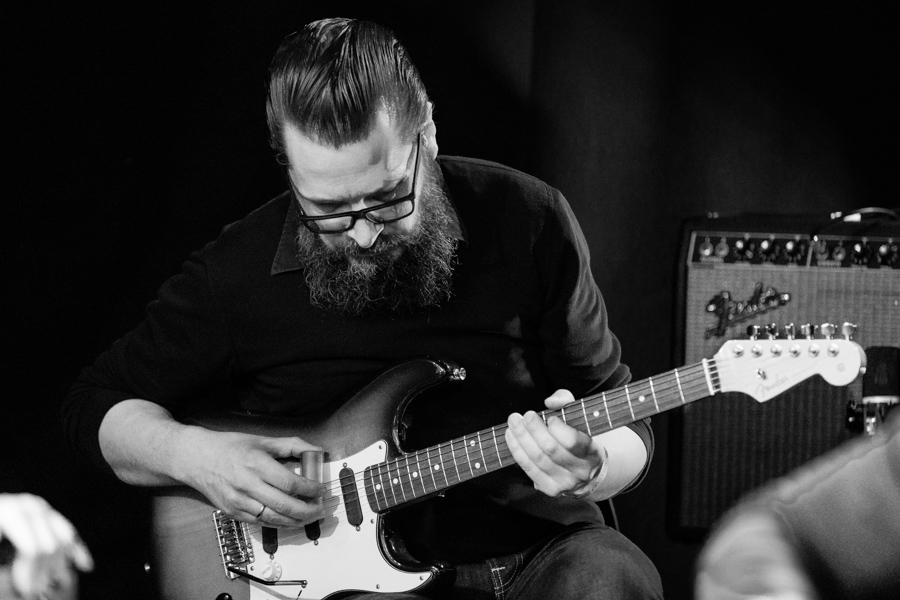
Helge Sten in a concert in Energimølla. The concert was part of Kongsberg Jazzfestival and took place on 4 July 2019 in Kongsberg.

Deathprod is the musical pseudonym used by Norwegian artist Helge Sten (born 26 January 1971) for his ambient music project. He is married to Norwegian singer Susanna Wallumrød.

== Biography ==
Sten began creating music under this name starting in 1991, culminating with a box set of most of his recorded work being released in 2004. Simply titled Deathprod, the collection contains three albums along with a bonus disc of previously unreleased, rare, and deleted tracks.

On recordings, Sten is usually credited with "Audio Virus", a catchall term for "homemade electronics, old tape echo machines, ring modulators, filters, theremins, samplers and lots of electronic stuff."

Sten also did the mixing of the album PB by the Norwegian artist Per Bergersen.

Sten is a member of Supersilent and works as a producer on many releases on the Norwegian label Rune Grammofon. He has also produced Motorpsycho and has worked with Biosphere on an Arne Nordheim tribute album called Nordheim Transformed.

== Discography ==
- Deathprod, self-released demo tape
- Demon Box (1993), as member of Motorpsycho
- Timothy‘s Monster (1994), as member of Motorpsycho
- Treetop Drive 1–3, Towboat (1994), Metal Art Disco
- Imaginary Songs from Tristan da Cunha (1996), dBUT Records
- Nordheim Transformed (with Biosphere) (1998), Rune Grammofon
- Morals and Dogma (2004), Rune Grammofon
- Deathprod (2004), Rune Grammofon
- 6-track 10" remix album (2006), Rune Grammofon
- Occulting Disk (2019), Smalltown Supersound
- Dark Transit EP (2019), Smalltown Supersound
- Sow Your Gold in the White Foliated Earth (2022), Smalltown Supersound
- Compositions (2023), Smalltown Supersound

== See also ==
- List of ambient music artists
