= Rune Grammofon =

Norwegian record label

- Founded: 1998; 28 years ago
- Founder: Rune Kristoffersen
- Distributors: ECM (2002–2005); Self-distributed (1998–2002, 2005–present)
- Genre: Various
- Country of origin: Norway
- Location: Oslo
- Official website: www.runegrammofon.com

Rune Grammofon is a Norwegian record label founded in 1998 by Rune Kristoffersen. Rune Grammofon's reputation for lovingly issued experimental electronic music, jazz, and improvised music by Norwegian artists has grown over the years with its artists being featured heavily in magazines such as The Wire and Plan B.

The label is home to the improvisational group Supersilent as well as the solo work of its members including Deathprod and Arve Henriksen. Other notable releases are by Shining, Susanna and the Magical Orchestra, Jono El Grande, Skyphone, Alog, Phonophani and Food.

In 2000, the label signed a distribution deal with ECM, which increased the label's audience considerably. This deal came to an end early 2005.

In November 2003, the label celebrated its 30th release by issuing a set that included a two-CD compilation and a book that displayed each of Kim Hiorthøy's highly praised digipak designs. An updated second edition of this was released in December 2008.
