= Tom Hasslan =

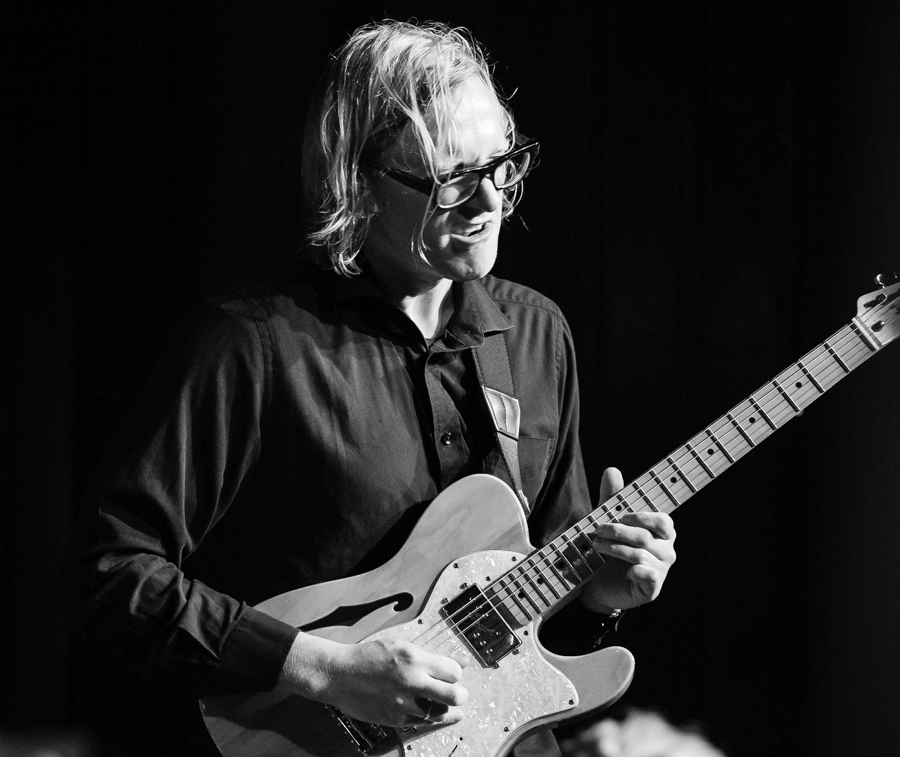
- Tom Hasslan performing in 2019

Background information
- Born: 1983 (age 42–43); Kongsberg, Buskerud
- Origin: Norway
- Genres: Jazz, prog-rock
- Occupation: Musician
- Instrument: Guitar
- Label: Rune Grammofon

Tom Hasslan (born 1983) is a Norwegian jazz guitarist from Kongsberg.

== Career ==
Hasslan began playing guitar at the age of 13 and made his debut at the Kongsberg Jazzfestival in 2007. He is primarily known for his work with the bands Krokofant and Soft Ffog, although he has also performed as a solo artist and in various collaborative projects. In 2017 he participated in a commissioned work by Morten Qvenild for the Kongsberg Jazzfestival.

=== Krokofant ===
Krokofant was originally formed as a duo with drummer Axel Skalstad before expanding into a trio with saxophonist Jørgen Mathisen (The Core, Zanussi Five). The band represented Norway at the Young Nordic Jazz Comets showcase programme in 2014.

For the band's fourth and fifth studio albums, the line-up was expanded with keyboardist Ståle Storløkken and bassist Ingebrigt Håker Flaten.

Krokofant was signed to Rune Grammofon until 2023, when the band joined Is It Jazz? Records, a label under Karisma & Dark Essence Records.

Following the death of Axel Skalstad in 2025, the band went on hiatus before returning in 2026 as a quartet featuring drummer Ole Mofjell and bassist Rune Nergaard.

Krokofant's music combines improvised jazz, progressive rock and jazz rock, drawing comparisons to artists such as Mahavishnu Orchestra, King Crimson, Terje Rypdal and Peter Brötzmann. Hasslan has cited Genesis and King Crimson among his influences.

=== Soft Ffog ===
Soft Ffog began as a solo project for the Kongsberg Jazzfestival in 2016 before evolving into a full band in 2020. Alongside Hasslan, the group featured drummer Axel Skalstad, bassist Trond Frønes (Red Kite, Grand General) and keyboardist Vegard Lien Bjerkan (replacing Erlend Slettevoll from the 2016-lineup). Following Skalstad's death, drummer Martin Langlie joined the band.

Soft Ffog performs a blend of progressive rock, jazz fusion and improvisation. The band's music has been described as a cross between King Crimson and Terje Rypdal, and between Deep Purple and Pat Metheny, while also drawing inspiration from bands such as Camel and Focus.

The band is signed to Is It Jazz? Records.

== Musical style ==
Hasslan's guitar playing is characterised by extended improvisational passages and melodic themes. Critics have highlighted his ability to move between progressive rock, psychedelic and jazz-oriented idioms within the same solo.

Soft Ffog has been described as more melody-driven and rooted in 1970s progressive rock than Krokofant, whose music places a greater emphasis on improvisation and heavier jazz-rock textures.

== Awards and recognition ==
- 2010 – Recruitment Award, Kongsberg Jazzfestival
- 2014 – Norwegian representative at Young Nordic Jazz Comets with Krokofant

== Discography ==
=== With Soft Ffog ===
- 2022: Soft Ffog (Is It Jazz? Records)
- 2025: Focus (Is It Jazz? Records)

=== With Krokofant ===
- 2014: Krokofant (Rune Grammofon)
- 2015: II (Rune Grammofon)
- 2017: III (Rune Grammofon)
- 2019: Q, Krokofant with Ståle Storløkken and Ingebrigt Håker Flaten
- 2021: Fifth, Krokofant with Ståle Storløkken and Ingebrigt Håker Flaten
- 2025: 6 (Is It Jazz? Records)

== Filmography ==
- Hjerte i jazzen (2015) – documentary film (as himself)
