= 1987 in Norwegian music =

The following is a list of notable events and releases of the year 1987 in Norwegian music.

== Events ==
=== April ===
- 10 – The 14th Vossajazz started in Vossavangen, Norway (April 10 – 12).

=== May ===
- 20 – The 15th Nattjazz started in Bergen, Norway (May 20 – June 3).

=== August ===
- 30 – The 18th Kalvøyafestivalen started at Kalvøya near by Oslo.

== Albums released ==
=== Unknown date ===
B

Ketil Bjørnstad

- Pianology (Hete Blikk)

G

Jan Garbarek

- Making Music (ECM Records), with Zakir Hussain, Hariprasad Chaurasia, and John McLaughlin
- All Those Born With Wings (ECM Records)

R

Terje Rypdal & The Chasers

- Blue (ECM Records)

== Deaths ==
January

- 25 – Øivind Bergh, violinist and orchestral leader (born 1909).

February

- 26 – Torbjørn Knutsen, composer and violinist (born 1904).

March

- 18 – Kari Diesen, actor and singer (born 1914).

May

- 13 – Signe Amundsen, classical violinist and orchestral leader (born 1899).

November

- 13 – Aage Samuelsen, evangelist, singer and composer (born 1915).

December

- 2 – Trygve Henrik Hoff, singer, composer, songwriter, and writer (born 1938).
- 16 – Eva Prytz, operatic soprano (born 1917).

== Births ==
January

- 25 – Ann-Iren Hansen, folk singer and songwriter.

February

- 15 – Trygve Waldemar Fiske, jazz upright bassist.
- 18 – Pål Moddi Knutsen, folk singer and songwriter.

March

- 13 – Harald Lassen, jazz saxophonist and pianist.

April

- 18 – Sandra Lyng, pop and dance singer.
- 25 – Ida Jenshus, country singer.
- 26 – Kim-Erik Pedersen, jazz saxophonist.

May

- 20 – Ingrid Helene Håvik, songwriter and vocalist.
- 24 – Mikhael Paskalev, singer, songwriter and guitarist.

June

- 11 – Didrik Solli-Tangen, singer.
- 30 – Aleksander Denstad With, pop singer.

August

- 13 – Bendik Brænne, rock saxophone player and singer/songwriter.
- 18 – Tine Thing Helseth, trumpet soloist.

September

- 11 – Bjørn Marius Hegge, jazz upright bassist and composer, Hegge.

October

- 12 – Bjørnar Kaldefoss Tveite, jazz upright bassist (Morning Has Occurred).
- 25 – André Drage, drummer.

November

- 13 – Hanna Paulsberg, jazz tenor saxophonist and composer.
- 29 – Cashmere Cat, DJ, record producer, musician and turntablist.

December

- 12 – Marte Eberson, jazz pianist, keyboardist and composer.

Unknown date

- Anja Lauvdal, jazz pianist, keyboardist, and composer.
- Hanne Kalleberg, jazz singer and composer.
- Thea Hjelmeland, Indie pop and folk singer and songwriter.

== See also ==
- 1987 in Norway
- Music of Norway
- Norway in the Eurovision Song Contest 1987
