= Torbjörn Zetterberg =

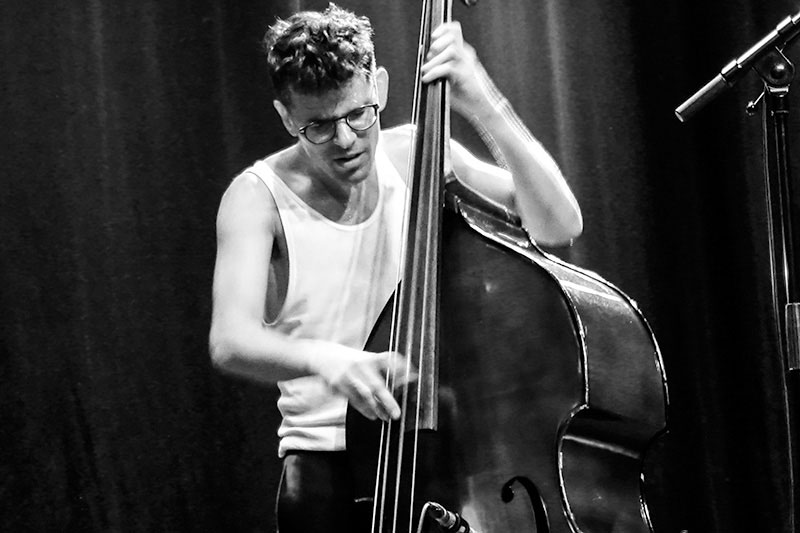

Background information
- Born: 10 May 1976 (age 50); Sweden
- Origin: Swedish
- Genre: Jazz
- Occupations: Jazz musician, composer
- Instrument: Upright bass
- Member of: Torbjörn Zetterberg Hot Five, Jonas Kullhammar Quartet

Torbjörn Zetterberg (born 10 May 1976) is a Swedish jazz musician (double bass) and composer, known from collaborations with Jonas Kullhammar. He is also a Zen Buddhist teacher and priest in the lineage of Philip Kapleau.

== Biography ==
Zetterberg attended Södra Latin och Fridhems Folkhögskola in Svalöv but was first recognised as bassist when he studied at Kungliga Musikhögskolan in Stockholm still young. Here he studied bass under guidance of Jan Adefelt. Soon he joined drummer Fredrik Norén's band together with the saxophonist Jonas Kullhammar. Now his name is firmly rooted in the vibrant progressive selection as the new jazz generation.

He went through a personal crisis and did not record as a bandleader for more than seven years. Zetterberg was uncomfortable with his career and in 2010 he decided to leave the urban life including his bass, and moved to a Buddhist temple. There he resided for a year and still spends half of his time there in 2016. This existential crisis led to the production of the album Och Den Stora Frågan ("And the Big Question" in Swedish) in 2014. Here he collaborated with well known musicians from his earlier career, like the Portuguese trumpeter Susana Santos Silva and drummer Jon Fält, known from albums with pianist Bobo Stenson's trio. The album is "charged with joyful urgency, shiny optimism and confident flowing energy, despite the doubts and uncertainties that accompany any creative, artistic process", the reporter of All About Jazz stated in 2014.

== Music groups ==
- Jonas Kullhammar Quartet (1998–2013)
- The Torbjörn Zetterberg Hot Five (Since 2000)

== Discography (in selection) ==
=== Solo albums ===
- 2005: Krissvit (Moserobie)
- 2007: Kvinnans Kamp (Moserobie)
- 2014: Och Den Stora Frågan (Moserobie)
- 2015: Om Liv & Död (Moserobie)

Torbjörn Zetterberg Hot Five

- 2002: Hela Sveriges Lilla Fästmö (Moserobie)
- 2002: The Torbjörn Zetterberg Hot Five (Moserobie)
- 2004: Förtjänar Mer Uppmärksamhet (Moserobie)

=== Collaborations ===
With Jonas Kullhammar Quartet (Jonas Holgersson, Torbjörn Gulz)

- 2000: Salut (Moserobie)
- 2001: The Soul Of Jonas Kullhammar (Moserobie)
- 2003: Plays Loud For The People (Moserobie)
- 2005: Snake City North (Moserobie), with Norrbotten Big Band
- 2006: Son Of A Drummer (Moserobie)
- 2010: Från Och Med Herr Jonas Kullhammar (Moserobie)
- 2013: Låt Det Vara (Moserobie)
- 2013: Plays A Love Supreme EP (Moserobie)
- 2013: This Is The End (Moserobie)

With Daniel Fredriksson and Jonas Kullhammar

- 2005: Gyldene Tider Vol. 1 (Moserobie)
- 2005: Gyldene Tider Vol. 2 (Moserobie)
- 2005: Gyldene Tider Vol. 3 (Moserobie)

With Alberto Pinton, Jonas Kullhammar and Kjell Nordeson

- 2009: Chant (Clean Feed)

With Ivo Perelman and Daniel Levin

- 2010: Soulstorm (Clean Feed)

With Jonas Kullhammar and Espen Aalberg

- 2012: Basement Sessions Vol. 1 (Clean Feed)
- 2014: Basement Sessions Vol. 2 (Clean Feed)
- 2014: Basement Sessions Vol. 3 - The Ljubljana Tapes (Clean Feed), including with Jørgen Mathisen

With Susana Santos Silva

- 2013: Almost Tomorrow (Clean Feed)
- 2015: If Nothing Else (Clean Feed), including with Hampus Lindwall
