= Grand general =

Grand general may refer to:

== Military rank ==
- Grand general (China)
- Grand general (Indonesia)
- Grand general (Vietnam)

== Music ==
- Grand General (band)
- Grand General (album)

== Other uses ==
- Foton Grand General G9, a mid-size pickup truck
