= Morning Has Occurred =

Norwegian jazz ensemble

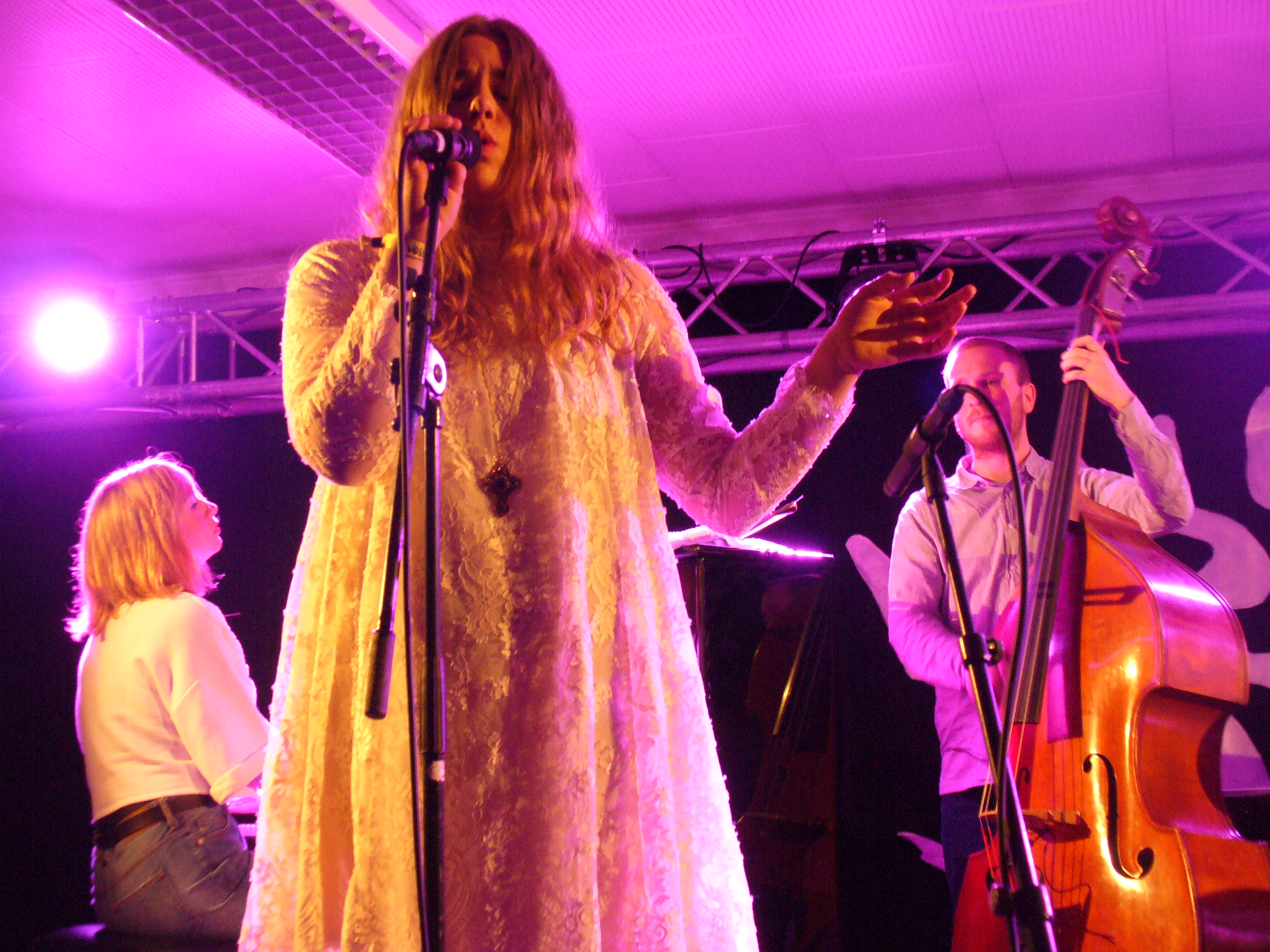
- Morning Has Occurred at Vossajazz in 2014.

Background information
- Origin: Bergen, Norway
- Genres: Jazz; Electronica; Experimental music
- Years active: 2010–present
- Labels: Ocean Sound Recordings
- Members: Natalie Sandtorv; Marte Eberson; Bjørnar Kaldefoss Tveite; Ole Mofjell

Morning Has Occurred (initiated 2010 in Bergen, Norway) is a Norwegian Jazz ensemble.

== Biography ==
The band members met on the Jazz program at Griegakademiet, and started the band in 2010. The quartet performs self composed material, which are based within jazz, combined with a small dose of contemporary music. The music contains abstract patterns ranging from appealing soundscapes crossed energetic impulses. Improvisation and interplay between the musicians are in focus. You can describe the music of this young quartet as a combination of different timbres, unusual instrumentation, and altered sounds that create an open and exciting soundscape.

The musicians in the band are also active in other bands and projects like 'Highasakite', 'Machine Birds', 'PolygonJunx', 'Teknopoly', among others, and has collaborated with the likes of Kjetil Møster, Jon Eberson and John Hegre. In autumn 2011 the band toured Norway with the guitarist Thomas T. Dahl. In 2013 they went touring Norway with Karl Seglem.

The band toured Japan and Europe in 2014. They also participated at the Vossajazz and the JazzIntro competition.

== Band members ==
- Natalie Sandtorv - vocals
- Marte Eberson - piano, keyboards
- Bjørnar Kaldefoss Tveite - upright bass
- Ole Mofjell - drums

== Discography ==
- 2014: Morning Has Occurred (Ocean Sound Recordings)
