= Erlend Slettevoll =

Norwegian jazz pianist

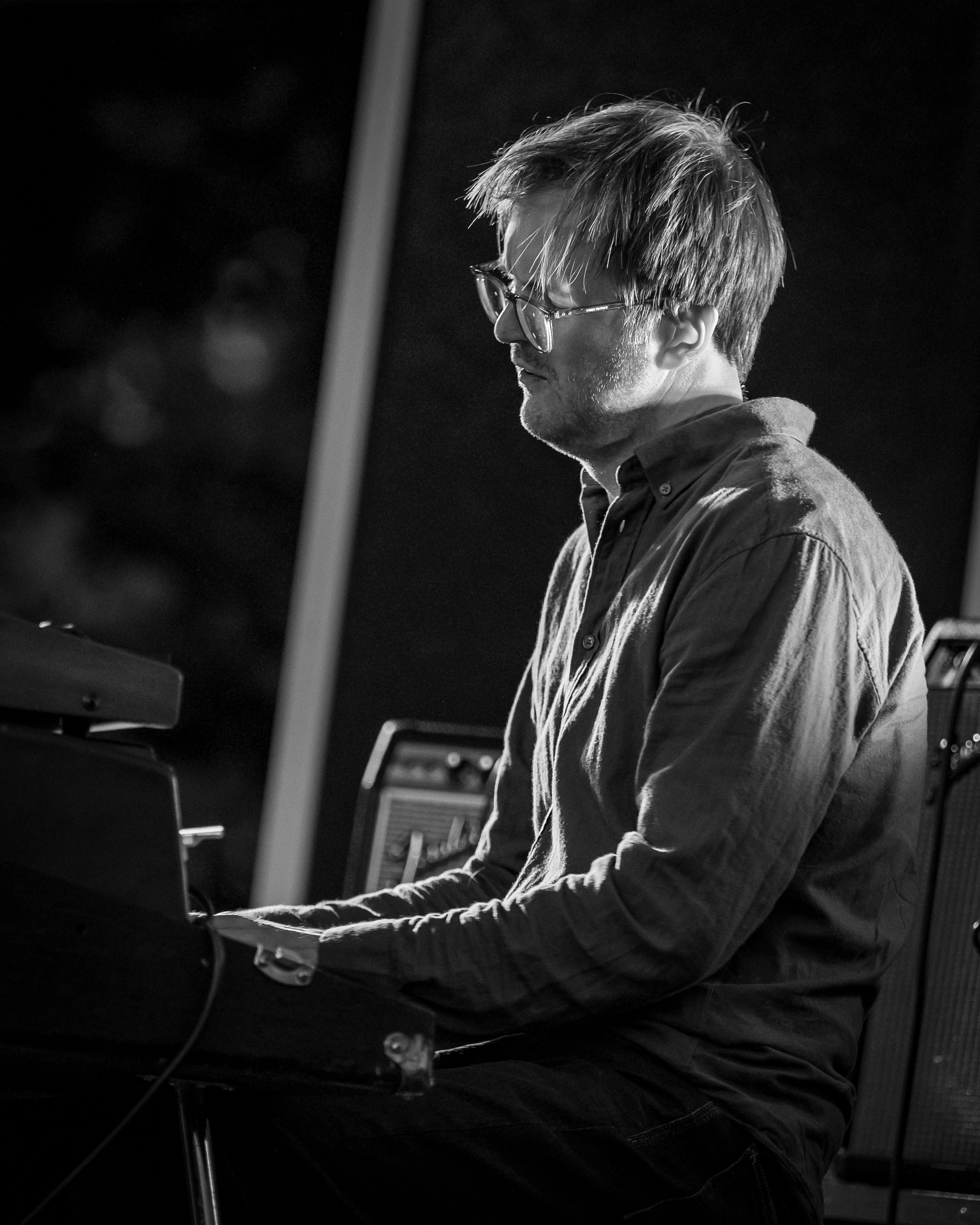
- Erlend Slettevoll 2022; Photo: Birgit Fostervold

Background information
- Born: 26 October 1981 (age 45); Volda Municipality, Møre og Romsdal, Norway
- Genre: Jazz
- Occupations: Musician, composer
- Instrument: Piano
- Website: www.slettevoll.no

Erlend Slettevoll (born 1981) is a Norwegian jazz pianist, known from cooperation with musicians like Ola Kvernberg, Petter Wettre, Heidi Skjerve, Kjetil Møster, Steinar Raknes and Espen Aalberg.

== Career ==
Slettevoll is a graduate of the jazz program at Trondheim Musikkonservatorium (2001–05). He was first recognized as member of the band The Core together with fellow students in Trondheim, Kjetil Møster, Steinar Raknes and Espen Aalberg. Later he worked with musicians like Petter Wettre and Heidi Skjerve.

Slettevoll was also a member of the band Grand General, originally Kenneth Kapstad Group. Violinist Ola Kvernberg, who was awarded Spellemannprisen for his album Liarbird, was in the forefront, alongside drummer Kenneth Kapstad (Motorpsycho), bassist Trond Frønes (El Doom), and guitarist Even Helte Hermansen (Bushman's Revenge).

Since 2022, Slettevoll has been a member of the Norwegian jazz-prog-rock band Needlepoint, replacing David Wallumrød.

== Discography ==
- 2004: Vision (Jazzaway), within The Core
- 2006: Cape Point (Bergland), within African Pepperbirds
- 2006: Coming Home (Curling Legs), within Heidi Skjerve Quintet
- 2006: Blue Sky (Jazzaway), within The Core
- 2007: Fountain of Youth (Household Records), within Petter Wettre Quartet
- 2007: Indian Core (Grappa Music), within The Core feat. Prasenjit Mitra, Kanchman Babbar and Fateh Ali
- 2007: Meditations on Coltrane (Grappa Music), with Bergen Big Band feat. The Core
- 2007: Office Essentials (Jazzland Records), within The Core
- 2008: Golonka Love (Moserobie), within The Core
- 2008: Morning News of the Woods (Curling Legs), within Heidi Skjerve Quintet
- 2008: Night Creatures (Pling Music), within "Audun Automat"
- 2009: The art of no return, Vol. 1 (Moserobie), within The Core and More
- 2010: Party (Moserobie), with among others Jonas Kullhammar and Kjetil Møster (recorded, mixed and producer by Espen Aalberg)
- 2011: Rainbow Band (Losen Records), The Rainbow Band Sessions, directed by John Surman
- 2011: Min Song Og Hjarteskatt (Kirkelig Kulturverksted), with Beate S. Lech
- 2013: Grand General (Rune Grammofon), within Grand General
- 2014: Playing Up To My Standards (Household Records), with Petter Wettre
