= Axel Skalstad =

Norwegian jazz and prog-rock drummer (1992–2025)

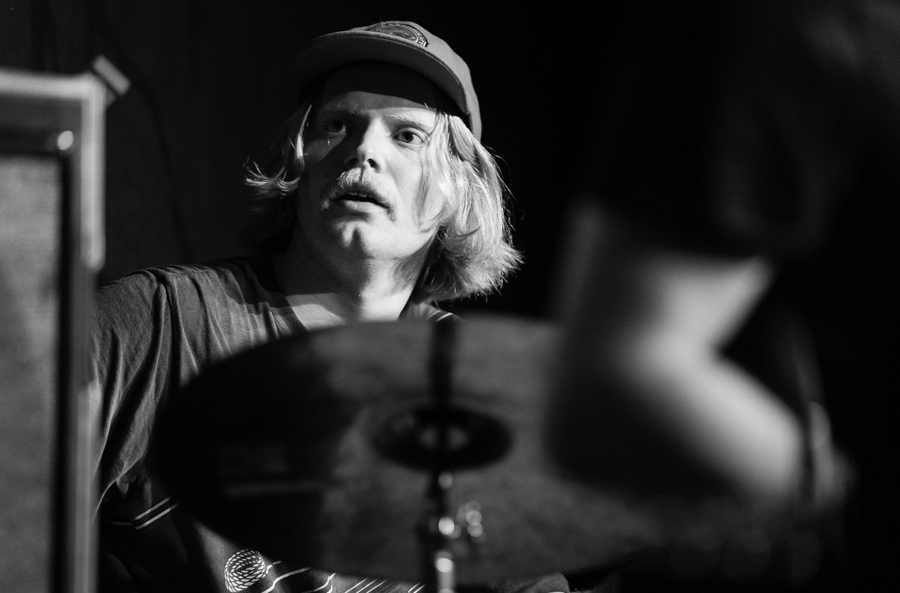
- Skalstad performing in 2019

Background information
- Born: 11 July 1992; Fiskum, Buskerud, Norway
- Origin: Norway
- Died: 9 June 2025 (aged 32)
- Genres: Jazz, prog-rock
- Occupations: Musician, composer
- Instrument: Drums
- Label: Rune Grammofon Is it jazz? Records

Axel Skalstad (11 July 1992 – 9 June 2025) was a Norwegian jazz and prog-rock drummer. He was born in Fiskum. He is mainly known as a member of the trio Krokofant with guitarist Tom Hasslan and saxophonist Jørgen Mathisen and the bands Soft Ffog and WIZRD. Skalstad died due to an accident on 9 June 2025, at the age of 32.

== Recognition and awards ==
- 2023: Spellemannprisen nomination, Rock, with WIZRD for Seasons (2022)
- 2012: The Kongsberg Jazzfestival’s recruitment award

== Discography ==
=== With WIZRD ===
Other members: Karl Bjorå, Hallvard Gaardløs, and Vegard Lien Bjerkan

- 2022: Seasons (Karisma Records)
- 2024: Elements (Karisma Records)

=== With Soft Ffog ===
Other members: Tom Hasslan, Trond Frønes, and Vegard Lien Bjerkan

- 2022: Soft Ffog (Is It Jazz? Records)
- 2025: Focus (Is It Jazz? Records)

=== With Krokofant ===
Other members: Tom Hasslan, Jørgen Mathisen

- 2014: Krokofant (Rune Grammofon)
- 2015: I (Rune Grammofon)
- 2017: II (Rune Grammofon)
- 2019: Q – with Ståle Storløkken & Ingebrigt Håker Flaten(Rune Grammofon)
- 2021: Fifth – with Ståle Storløkken & Ingebrigt Håker Flaten (Rune Grammofon)
- 2025: 6 (Is It Jazz? Records)

=== With Sjøen ===
Other members: Håkon Aase, Harald Lassen, Johan Lindvall og Bjørnar Kaldefoss Tveite

- 2014: Live I (Havtorn Records)

=== With LoveLoveLove ===
- 2014: Kaleidoscope (Kakao musikk)

=== With Rune Your Day ===
- 2017: Rune Your Day (Clean Feed)

=== With Pekula ===
- 2018: Vol. 1 - ARP (Pekula Records)
