= Natalie Sandtorv =

Norwegian jazz musician (born 1988)

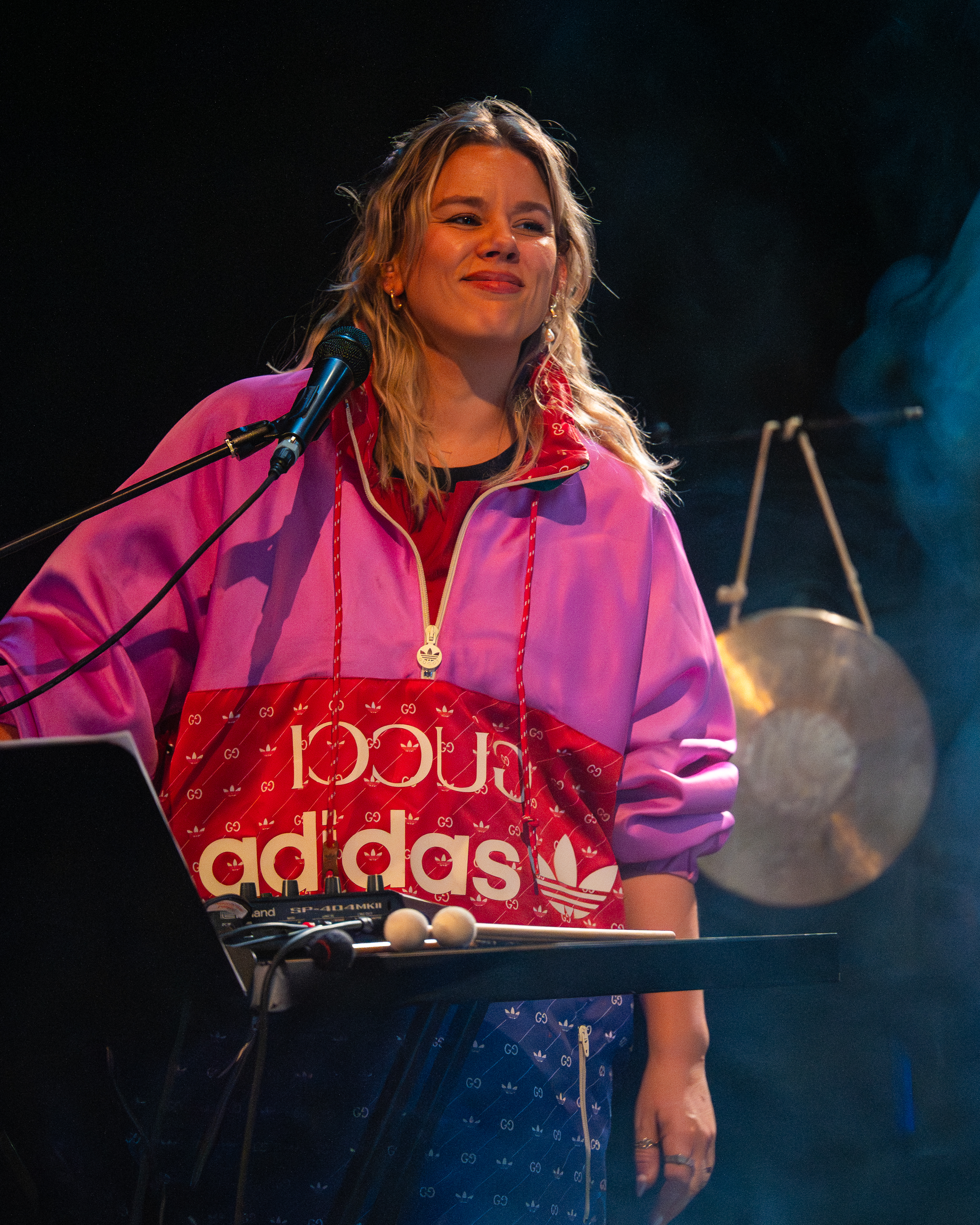
- Natalie Sandtorv 2025

Background information
- Born: Natalie Sandtorv; 17 August 1988 (age 37); Ålesund, Sunnmøre
- Origin: Norway Hungary
- Genres: Jazz
- Occupations: Musician, composer
- Instruments: Vocals, waterphone, harmonium, elektronics
- Website: www.thejistmusic.com

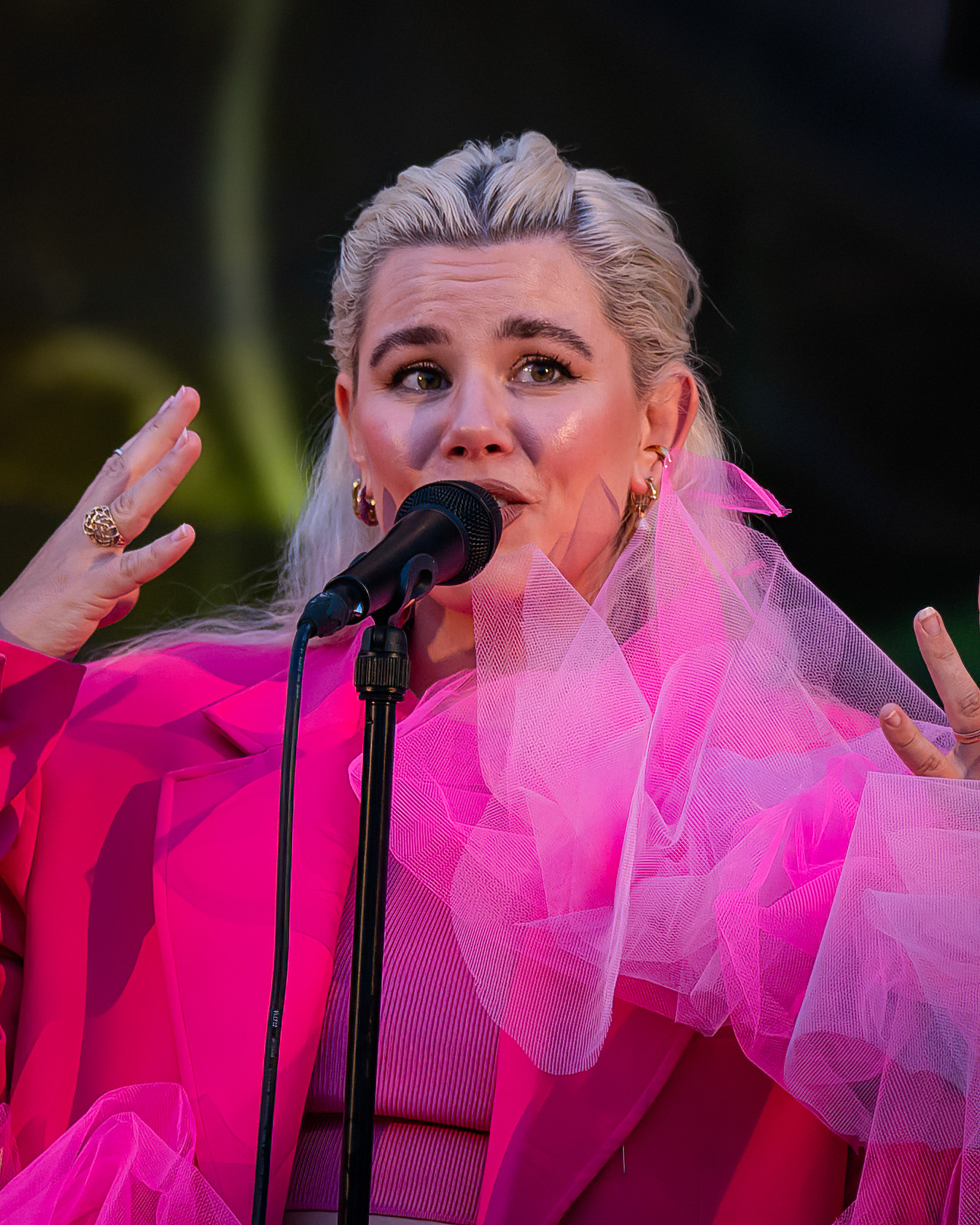
Sandtorv as Neon Ion, 2024

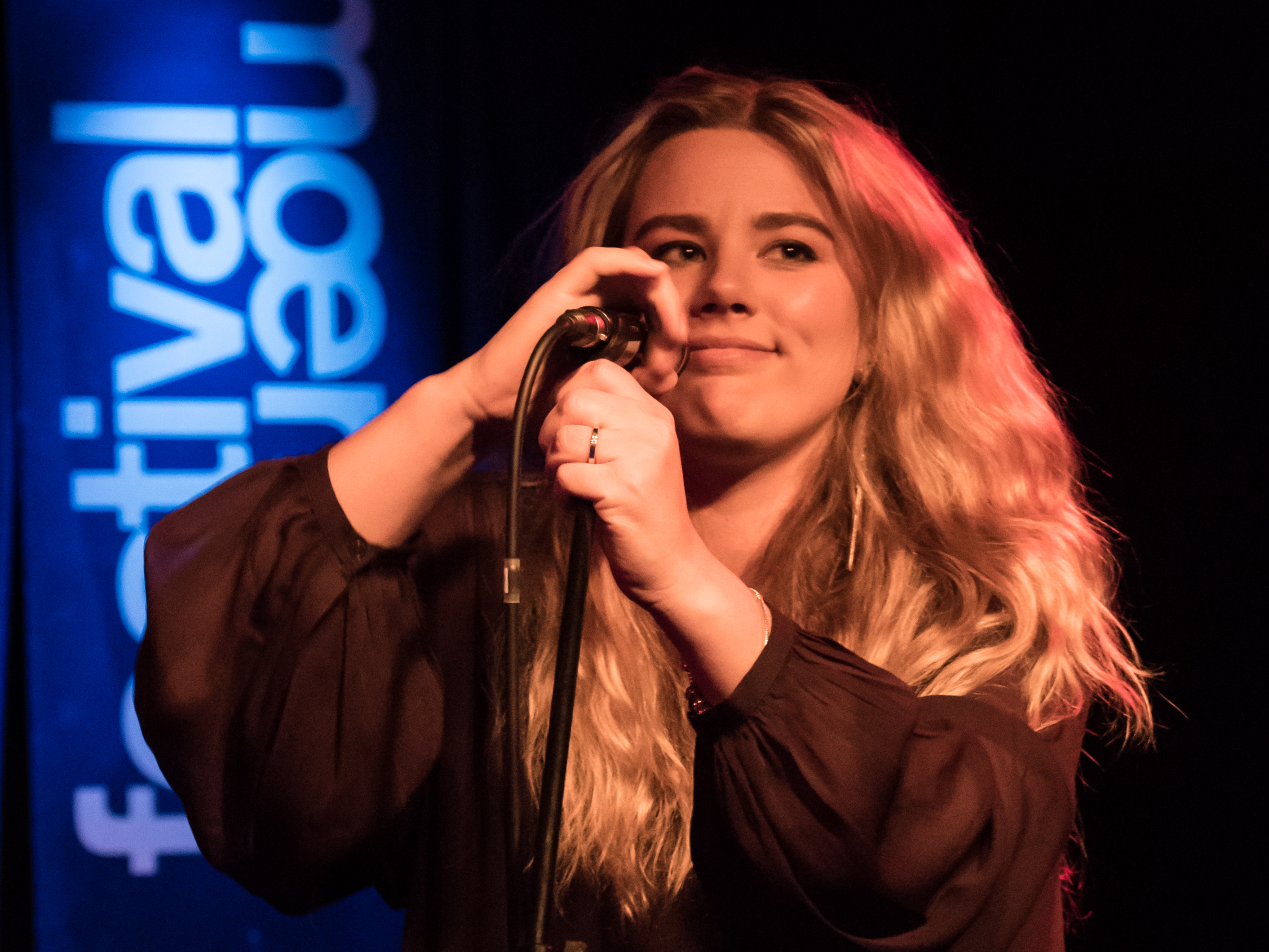
Sandtorv at the Moers Festival 2016

Natalie Sandtorv (born 17 August 1988) is a Norwegian jazz musician (vocals, waterphone, harmonium, electronics) married July 29, 2016, to drummer Ole Mofjell, residing in Copenhagen, Denmark.

== Biography ==
Sandtorv was born in Ålesund, Norway. She studied jazz, improvisational music and electronics at the Norwegian Academy of Music in Oslo and at Griegakademiet in Bergen. She is known for her exploration of different expressions within improvisational music in solo projects and with various ensembles. Sandtorv started the band Polygon Junx in Bergen 2011, together with noise artist John Hegre. and drummer Thore Warland from the band Staer. They combine their references from jazz, contemporary music, noise, rock and free improvisation, creating an unpredictable and unique sound, and in 2012 they played in Geneva (Switzerland), Landmark and Playdate (Bergen, Norway), Heck (Trondheim, Norway) and Blowout (Oslo, Norway). They also delivered a gig at Det Norske Studentersamfunn in Oslo featuring Marte Eberson and Kjetil Møster the same year.

In 2013 she went touring with Morning Has Occurred together with Karl Seglem, and also performed on tour with her boyfriend Ole Mofjell (drummer of Morning Has Occurred), playing three concerts in Kraków and Berlin, in addition to concerts in Norway. She also did a solo project for voice and electronics that was presented at Festspillene i Bergen, where she also presented a children's concert for the music festival. At the 2013 Julejazz in Ålesund, she collaborated with the brothers Christian Skår Winther and Andreas Skår Winther as a trio.

Sandtorv is most known as front singer of the band Morning Has Occurred including with Marte Eberson, touring in Europe (2014). They also joined the Vossajazz and JazzIntro competition,. They had received good reviews for performances at Norwegian jazz festivals like Midtsommejazz, Nattjazz, Vossajazz, Maijazz, Anjazz, and Balejazz.

Sandtorv bring the experimental concept of improvised meetings between innovative vocal artists and guitarists to a new extreme with the duo album The Jist with the inventive guitarist Torgeir Standal. They are keeping up the tradition of the master vocal artist Sidsel Endresen and highly inventive guitarist Stian Westerhus, but also inspired by the more experimental music of Maja Ratkje. In 2015 she released her first solo album Pieces Of Solitude.

She performed a duoproject in 2015 together with the British multi instrumentalist Steve Beresford at the Blow Out! festival in Oslo, Norway. Sandtorv is the initiator of the concert series Playdate in Bergen and Jugendjazz in Ålesund. In November 2015, she released her first solo album Pieces Of Solitude on the Va Fongool label.

== Honors ==
- 2016: Awarded Sparebank 1 Jazz Talent at the 2016 Moldejazz

== Discography ==
=== Solo albums ===
- 2015: Pieces Of Solitude (Va Fongool)
- 2017: Freedom Nation (Øra Fonogram), commission for Moldejazz

=== Collaborations ===
With duo The Jist, including guitarist Torgeir Standal

- 2014: The Jist (Va Fongool)

With Morning Has Occurred

- 2014: Morning Has Occurred (Ocean Sound Recordings)

With Cokko

- 2016: The Dance Upon My Grave (Playdate Records)

With Not On The Guest List

- 2016: Free! Spirit! Chant! (Gaffer Records)
