= Jørgen Mathisen =

Norwegian jazz musician (born 1984)

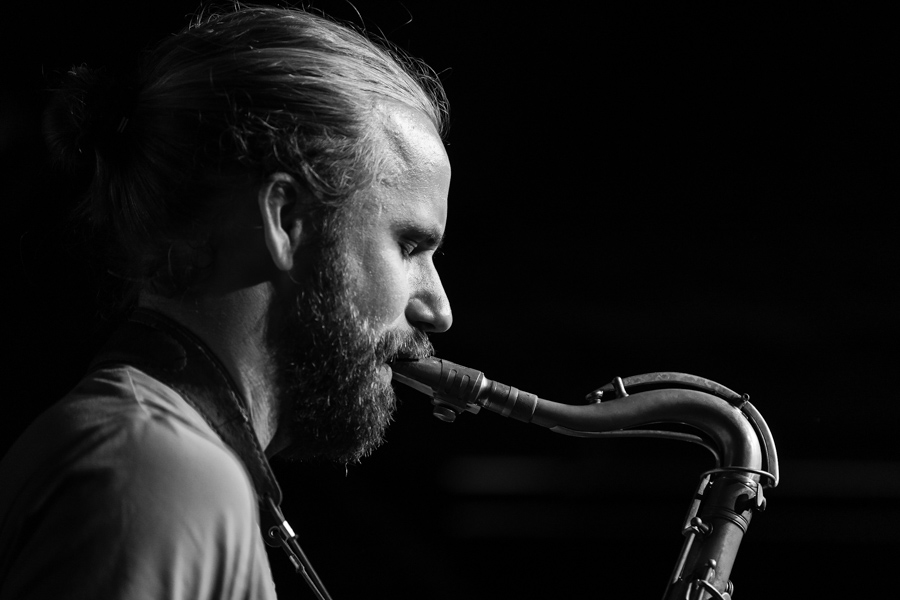
- Jørgen Mathisen performing in 2019

Background information
- Born: 27 December 1984 (age 41); Oslo, Norway
- Genre: Jazz
- Occupations: Musician, composer
- Instruments: Saxophone, clarinet

Jørgen Mathisen (born 27 December 1984 in Oslo, Norway) is a Norwegian jazz musician (saxophone and clarinet), the younger brother of Martin Mathisen (born 1978), and known from different bands, and a series of recordings with musician like Marc Lohr, Per Zanussi, Steinar Raknes, Eirik Hegdal, Gard Nilssen, and Kjetil Møster.

== Career ==
Mathisen is a graduate of the Jazz program at Trondheim Musikkonservatorium (2004–08). He is distinguished by his powerful, expressive play and is a force for all the bands he is involved with. He was first noted in the band Shagma in 2004, and also play within The Core together with Steinar Raknes, Espen Aalberg and Erlend Slettevoll, and within Zanussi Five including Eirik Hegdal, Kjetil Møster and Gard Nilssen, among others. with Tom Hasslan and Axel Skalstad he performed as Krokofant.

== Discography ==
With Shagma

- 2005: Music (Jazzaway)

With The Core

- 2008: Golonka Love (Moserobie Music)
- 2009: The art of no return (Moserobie Music)
- 2010: Party (Moserobie Music)

With Zanussi Five

- 2010: Ghost Dance (Moserobie Music)

With Trondheim Jazz Orchestra

- 2009: What If? A Counterfactual Fairytale (MNJ Records), conducted and composed by Erlend Skomsvoll
- 2011: Morning Songs (MNJ Records), composed by Per Zanussi

With Kullhammar, Mathisen, Zetterberg, Aalberg

- 2014: Basement Sessions Vol. 3 - The Ljubljana Tapes (Clean Feed)

With other projects

- 2007: What you Hear Is What You Get (Ponca Jazz Records), within "Entusijazzme»
- 2008: Night Creatures (Pling Music), within "Audun Automat»
- 2010: Stick No Bill (Unit Records), with Marc Lohr and GERÄT7
