= Bjørnar Kaldefoss Tveite =

Norwegian jazz upright bassist

- Born: 12 October 1987 (age 38); Voss Municipality, Hordaland
- Origin: Norway
- Genre: Jazz
- Occupations: Musician, composer
- Instrument: Upright bass
- Member of: Morning Has Occurred

Bjørnar Kaldefoss Tveite (born 12 October 1987 at Voss Municipality, Norway) is a Norwegian jazz upright bassist, known from bands like Hullyboo and Morning Has Occurred.

== Career ==
Tveite linked musical ties with guitarist Marius Hirth Klovning already at Voss ungdomsskule. Then they have played together steadily in various contexts since. They started the band Hullyboo, which play self composed material, along with drummer Mats Mæland Jensen. Im 2009 they won the Jazz i sikte competition along with the trio Lugom, where Tveite collaborates with Marte Eberson, who is the main songwriter, and drummer Andreas Wildhagen.

Together with front figure and singer Natalie Sandtorv, Marte Eberson an Ole Mofjell, he performed on stages across Europe and in Japan with the Quartet 'Morning Has Occurred' with a current self titled debut album (2014).

== Awards ==
- 2009: Winner of the Jazz i sikte within the bands Hullyboo and Lugom

== Discography ==
- 2020 Northwestern songs, Arne Torvik trio, Losen Records
- 2019 Farkost, Hullyboo, Øra Fonogram
- 2019 Lang Vinter, Caroline Wallace, Øra Fonogram
- 2014 Morning Has Occurred, Morning Has Occurred, Ocean Sound Recordings
- 2014 Live I, Sjøen, Havtorn Records
- 2012 Bønner og flesk, Hullyboo, NORCD
