= The Jist =

Norwegian experimental jazz duo

- Origin: Oslo, Norway
- Genres: Jazz
- Years active: 2012–present
- Labels: Va Fongool
- Members: Natalie Sandtorv; Torgeir Standal
- Website: www.thejistmusic.com

The Jist (initiated 2012 in Oslo, Norway) is a Norwegian experimental contemporary jazz duo comprising Natalie Sandtorv and Torgeir Standal.

== Biography ==
Sandtrov and Standall are both from Ålesund in the western part of Norway, but did not meet until they started musical studies in Oslo in 2011. They wanted to explore sonically the implications of distressed urban life in the big city. They released a self-titled debut album (2014), recorded after two years of exploring and articulating a highly original language, employed with alternative approaches to their instruments in order to sketch dynamic, free-improvised soundscapes. Here they bring the experimental concept of improvised meetings between innovative vocal artists and guitarists to a new extreme. The album was recorded in Bergen, and John Hegre of Jazzkammer controlled the mixing and mastering. The album cover was executed by the artist Henrik Koppen.

The Jist was well received at the 2015 Match & Fuse Festival in Warsaw. They "managed to make the whole venue literally rattle with just a guitar going through a volume pedal and a TC Electronic Mojomojo with some crocodile clips". They visited Poland with the tour "Owls Are Not!", and performed at the MÓZG Festival, among others. They also played a gig at the Yellow Vision in Asagaya, Tokyo, and the avant garde music Cafe Oto in London, the same year.

== Band members ==
- Natalie Sandtorv - vocals, electronics
- Torgeir Standal - guitar

== Discography ==
- 2014: The Jist (Va Fongool)
