= The Core (band) =

Norwegian jazz band

- Origin: Trondheim, Norway
- Genres: Jazz
- Years active: 1999–present
- Labels: Jazzaway, Grappa, Jazzland
- Members: Espen Aalberg; Kjetil Møster; Erlend Slettevoll; Steinar Raknes
- Past members: Jørgen Mathisen

The Core (established 1999 in Trondheim, Norway) is a Norwegian jazz quartet. Its musical style is rooted in African-American jazz traditions, with elements of funk and rock.

== Biography ==
The quartet was formed by saxophonist Kjetil Møster, pianist Erlend Slettevoll, bassist Steinar Raknes, and drummer and initiator Espen Aalberg, while all four members were students in the Jazz programme at the Norwegian University of Science and Technology (NTNU).

The band made its album debut with Vision in 2004. That same year, the quartet received the ExxonMobil Jazz Award at the Molde International Jazz Festival. This was followed by Blue Sky in 2006, which, like the debut album, was released by Jazzaway Records. During this period, the quartet developed a style based on free jazz and American spiritual jazz of the 1960s and 1970s, combined with elements of funk and rock. Among its influences were Pharoah Sanders, Archie Shepp, Albert Ayler, and John Coltrane. Several releases followed in 2007, including The Indian Core, which grew out of the band’s collaboration with Indian musicians.

In 2008, Møster was replaced by Jørgen Mathisen, who appeared on the subsequent albums Golonka Love (2008), The Art of No Return (2009), and Party (2010). After several years of limited activity, the original line-up reunited in 2021. In 2024, the quartet released the album Roots.

The Core has performed at most of Norway’s major jazz festivals, sometimes accompanied by guest soloists including James Carter, Jonas Kullhammar, Per Johansson, and Håkon Kornstad. A performance from Tampere in 2004 was broadcast through the European Broadcasting Union.

== The Indian Core (2005–2007) ==
On behalf of Concerts Norway and the Norwegian Ministry of Foreign Affairs, the quartet toured India, Pakistan, and Bangladesh in the autumn of 2005. The project was presented to Norwegian audiences the following year through a tour of Norwegian cultural centres organised by Concerts Norway.

The Indian musicians appearing on both tours were Fateh Ali on sitar and vocals, Prasanjit Mitra on tabla, and Kanchman Babbar on flute. The project resulted in the album The Indian Core, released in 2007.

== Awards ==
- 2004: ExxonMobil Jazz Award at the Molde International Jazz Festival

== Band members ==
- Espen Aalberg – drums, principal composer
- Steinar Raknes – bass, principal composer
- Erlend Slettevoll – piano
- Kjetil Møster – saxophone (1999–2008, 2021–present)

=== Former members ===
- Jørgen Mathisen – saxophone (2008–2012)

=== Guest musicians ===
- Nils-Olav Johansen – guitar on Blue Sky (2006)
- Fateh Ali – sitar and vocals on The Indian Core (2007) and the preceding tours (2005–2006)
- Prasanjit Mitra – tabla on The Indian Core (2007) and the preceding tours (2005–2006)
- Kanchman Babbar – flute on The Indian Core (2007) and the preceding tours (2005–2006)

== Discography ==
- 2004: Vision (Jazzaway)
- 2006: Blue Sky (Jazzaway)
- 2007: Office Essentials (Jazzland)
- 2007: Meditations On Coltrane (Grappa), with Bergen Big Band
- 2007: The Indian Core (Grappa)
- 2008: Golonka Love (Moserobie)
- 2009: The Art of No return (Moserobie)
- 2010: Party (Moserobie)
- 2024: Roots (Moserobie)
