= Torgeir Standal =

Norwegian jazz guitarist

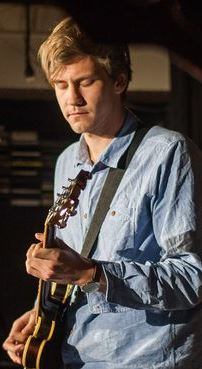

Background information
- Born: Torgeir Hovden Standal; 23 July 1990 (age 36); Ørsta, Møre og Romsdal
- Origin: Norway
- Genres: Jazz
- Occupations: Musician, composer
- Instrument: Guitar
- Member of: The Jist
- Website: www.thejistmusic.com

Torgeir Hovden Standal (born 23 July 1990) is a Norwegian jazz guitarist.

== Career ==
Standall was raised in Ørsta, near Ålesund, but moved to Oslo in 2011. He soon met with Natalie Sandtorv and they started The Jist, a duo projects where the guitar meets vocals. After two years of collaboration on a series of performances they released the self-titled debut album (2014). The album was recorded in Bergen, and John Hegre known from Jazzkammer, controlled the mixing and mastering.

In 2014 he toured with The Jist and played a gig at Madame Claude, Berlin. In 2015 they was well received at the 2015 Match & Fuse Festival in Warsaw and also gave concerts in Torino. He is also active on local venues with projects like the tribute band Wild Things Run Fast, celebrating the music of Joni Mitchell together with musicians like Siril Malmedal Hauge (vocals), Olav Opsvik (piano), Martin Morland (bass) and Henrik Lødøen (drums).

== Discography ==
- 2014: The Jist (Va Fongool)
