= John Hegre discography =

John Hegre Discography

Solo albums

- 2003: A Nice Place To Leave (Dekorder)
- 2005: Snow King (Rape Art)
- 2006: Colors don´t clash (Dekorder)

== Collaborations ==
As John Hegre/Lasse Marhaug/Helge Sten

- 1999: The Comfort of Objects (Ohm Records)

With Der Brief

- 1999: Volum (Jazzassin Records)

With Kaptein Kaliber

- 1999: Terry (Kaptein Kaliber Records)
- 2002: Pop Ultra (Tellè Records)
- 2002: Pop Ultra 2 (Tellè Records)
- 2003: Pop Ultra 2B (Tellè Records)
- 2007: Hjelp (Karisma Records)
- 2012: Forvirring, Samfunnets Lim (YAP)

As John Hegre/Lasse Marhaug

- 2002: Acoustic (Authorised Version)

As John Hegre/Lasse Marhaug/Y Yoshida

- 2002: Saturday Night Groove Sessions (Xerxes)

With The Golden Serenades

- 2003: Super Cheap 1 $ (Gameboy Records)
- 2003: II (Gameboy Records)
- 2005: The Swan (Abisko)
- 2005: Navilandia (Argentina)
- 2007: Morning Star/Evening Fix (LP) 2007 (Segerhuva), with Testicle Hazard
- 2008: The Golden Serenades/Sewer Election & Treriksröstet (Roggbiff Records)
- 2008: Kavardàk (Rumpus Records)
- 2009: Hamond Pops (+3dB)
- 2012: The Age Of Swing (A Dear Girl Called Wendy)

As John Hegre/Maja Ratkje

- 2005: Ballads (Dekorder)

As John Hegre/Howard Stelzer

- 2007: The Boring Leading The Bored (humbug)

As John Hegre/Lene Grenager/Harald Fetveit/Else Olsen S

- 2009: Ute (AIM)

As John Hegre & Marcelo Aguirre & Die Polizei

- 2009: Live at Adolf 666 (soopa records)

With Jazzkammer

- 1999: Timex (Rune Grammofon)
- 2000: Hot Action Sexy Karaoke (Ground Fault Records)
- 2001: Live at Molde International Jazz Festival (STS), with Merzbow
- 2001: Sound of Music (Ohm Records)
- 2002: Pancakes (Smalltown Supersound)
- 2003: New Water (Ohm Records)
- 2003: Pulse (Bottrop-boy)
- 2005: Mort Aux Vaches (Staalplaat)
- 2005: Jazzkammer/Opec (Reverse Recordings)
- 2006: Panic (CD), 2006 (Bottrop-boy)
- 2006: Fun For None (Load Records), with VA
- 2007: Tomorrow No One Will Be Safe (PACREC), with Howard Stelzer

With Jazkamer

- 2005: Ninguna Diversion (Utech Records)
- 2005: Bento Box (Abisko)
- 2006: Proud To Be Un American (Gameboy Records)
- 2007: Eat Shit (Asspiss Records)
- 2007: Balls The Size Of Texas, Liver The Size Of Brazil (Purplesoil)
- 2007: Motorcycle Fuck With The Ghost Rider (Archive), with Astro/Hair Stylistics
- 2007: Jazkamer/Smegma Split (No Fun Productions)
- 2008: Artbreaker (Smalltown Supersound)
- 2010: Solitary Nail (PicaDisk)
- 2010: Musica Non Grata (PicaDisk)
- 2010: The Monroe Doctrine (PicaDisk)
- 2010: Chestnut Thornback Tar (PicaDisk/Type records)
- 2010: Peanuts (PicaDisk)
- 2010: Cover By Hairstylistics (PicaDisk)
- 2010: We Want Epic Drama (PicaDisk)
- 2010: Self Portrait (PicaDisk)
- 2010: Matthew 28:17 (PicaDisk)
- 2010: Failed State Of Mind (PicaDisk/Robert&Leopold)
- 2010: Metal Music Machine 2 (PicaDisk)
- 2010: The Young Persons Guide To Jazkamer (PicaDisk)

With Rehab

- 2008: Man under train situation (+3dB)

With BlackPackers

- 2009: All Ears Bleed (Ritte Ritte Ross)

With Tralten Eller Utpult

- 2013: Tralten Eller Utpult (Kassett)

With NOXAGT

- 2014: Brutage (Drid Machine)

With Irabagon, Hegre & Drønen

- 2017: Axis (Rune Grammofon)
