= 1914 in Norwegian music =

The following is a list of notable events and releases of the year 1914 in Norwegian music.

== Births ==
February

- 17 – Magne Elvestrand, pianist and harpsichordist, best known as an organist (died 1991).

June

- 24 – Kari Diesen, actor and singer (died 1987).

November

- 14 – Leif Solberg, classical composer and organist (died 2016).

== See also ==
- 1914 in Norway
- Music of Norway
