= Beate S. Lech =

Norwegian jazz singer, composer and lyricist

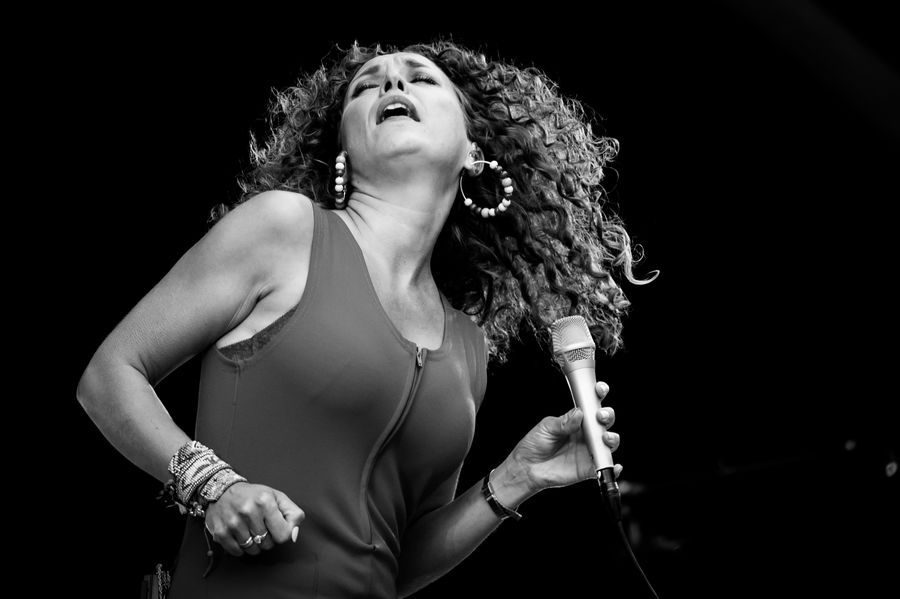
- Beate S. Lech performing in 2017; Photo: Matija Pužar

Background information
- Born: Beate Slettevoll Lech; 10 April 1974 (age 52); Volda Municipality, Møre og Romsdal
- Origin: Norway
- Genres: Jazz
- Occupations: Musician and composer
- Instrument: Vocals
- Labels: Kirkelig Kulturverksted; Jazzland
- Website: www.kkv.no/en/Music/Utgivelser/2011/Beate-Lech

Beate Slettevoll Lech (born 10 April 1974 in Volda, Møre og Romsdal, Norway) is a Norwegian jazz singer, composer and lyricist in modern jazz and related music, raised in Øvre Årdal, Sogn og Fjordane. She grew up in Volda Municipality, Møre og Romsdal as the daughter of the Polish jazz violinist Zdzislaw Lech, known from bands like "Folk & Røvere", Jon Eberson's band Metropolitan (two albums and appearance at Moldejazz 1999), and Beady Belle with her husband jazz bassist Marius Reksjø, and has attracted attention in concerts internationally.

== Career ==
Lech is a graduate of the University of Oslo and Norges Musikkhøgskole in Oslo. She has collaborated with musicians like Bugge Wesseltoft. On the solo album Min Song Og Hjarteskatt (2011), she show her close relationship to hymns and folk tunes, and her strong desire to make visible female voices in this male dominated arena. With help from lyricists Marit Kaldhol, Hilde Myklebust and Bente Bratlund, and poems from her late grandmother, she presents this lyrical album together with the musicians Marius Reksjø (bass), Erlend Slettevoll (piano), David Wallumrød (keyboards), Knut Aalefjær (drums) and Georg Riedel (double bass).

Under the name Beady Belle, Lech participated in Melodi Grand Prix 2021 and attempted to represent Norway in the Eurovision Song Contest 2021 with the song "Playing With Fire". She did not qualify from Heat 1, and subsequently lost the Second Chance round.

== Discography ==
Solo album

- 2011: Min Song Og Hjarteskatt (Kirkelig Kulturverksted)
- 2014: Høgtidsrom (Kirkelig Kulturverksted), with SKRUK

Within Beady Belle

- 2001: Home (Jazzland)
- 2003: Cewbeagappic (Jazzland)
- 2005: Closer (Jazzland)
- 2008: Belvedere (Jazzland), includes duets with India Arie Simpson and Jamie Cullum
- 2010: At Welding Bridge (Jazzland)
- 2013: Cricklewood Broadway (Jazzland)
- 2015: Songs From a Decade - The Best of Beady Belle (Jazzland)

Within Metropolitan

- 1999: Metropolitan (Columbia Records)
- 2004: Love Is Blind (Curling Legs), with strings
