= Espen Aalberg =

Norwegian jazz musician

- Born: 12 October 1975 (age 50); Trondheim, Trondelag, Norway
- Origin: Norway
- Genres: Jazz
- Occupations: Musician, Composer
- Instruments: Drum kit, Percussion
- Website: jazzfest.no/event/jamsession-espen-aalberg

Espen Aalberg (born 12 October 1975) is a Norwegian jazz drummer. He is known for his work with ensemblels such as The Core, Shagma, Kwaz, and the Håvard Lund Quartet, as well as collaborations with musicians including Jonas Kullhammar, Håvard Wiik, and Torbjörn Zetterberg. Aalberg has also contributed to a number of recordings.

== Career ==
Aalberg performed with the Namsos percussion ensemble from 1988 to 1994, during which the group won national competitions in ensemble performance. He later studied at the conservatory in Tromsø and in the Jazz Program at the Trondheim Musikkonservatorium (1998–2000).

While in Trondheim, Aalberg co-founded the band The Core with fellow students Kjetil Møster, Erlend Slettevoll, and Steinar Raknes. In 2004 he established the ensemble Shagma with Jørgen Mathisen and Raknes. At the Nattjazz festival in Bergen in 2006, he led the group Kwaz, featuring Jonas Kullhammar, Håvard Wiik, and Torbjörn Zetterberg. He has also performed with the Håvard Lund Quartet.

In 2006, Aalberg and The Core collaborated with Indian musicians during a tour of India, later appearing at the Oslo World Music Festival under the name *The Indian Core*. The project resulted in the album The Indian Core (2007).

In addition to his work in jazz, Aalberg has performed as a percussionist with the Trondheim Symphony Orchestra, Trondheim Sinfonietta, and the Luftforsvarets Musikkorps.

== Discography ==
=== As leader/co-leader ===
Year	Album	Label	With
2004	Vision	Jazzaway	The Core
2005	Music	Jazzaway	Shagma
2006	Blue Sky	Jazzaway	The Core
2007	The Indian Core	Grappa	The Indian Core (with Prasenjit Mitra, Kanchman Babbar, Fateh Ali)
2007	Office Essentials	Jazzland	The Core
2007	Meditations on Coltrane	Grappa	The Core & Bergen Big Band
2008	Golonka Love	Moserobie	The Core
2009	The Art of No Return, Vol. 1	Moserobie	The Core & More
2010	Party	Moserobie	With Jonas Kullhammar and Kjetil Møster (recorded, mixed, and produced by Aalberg)
2012	Basement Sessions, Vol. 1	Clean Feed	With Jonas Kullhammar and Torbjörn Zetterberg

=== As sideman ===
Year	Album	Label	With
2008	Så rart	Øra	Trondheim Sinfonietta
