= Liarbird =

Jazz album by Ola Kvernberg

Studio album by Ola Kvernberg Mathias Eick Håkon Kornstad Eirik Hegdal Bergmund Waal Skaslien Ingebrigt Håker Flaten Ole Morten Vågan Erik Nylander Torstein Lofthus
- Released: 30 September 2011
- Recorded: June 2010 at Ocean Sound Studio, Giske
- Genre: Modern Jazz
- Length: 66:07
- Label: Jazzland Recordings

Ola Kvernberg chronology
Folk (2009)	Liarbird (2011)	Grand General (2013)

Liarbird (released 30 September 2011 in Oslo, Norway by label Bolage – BLGCD 018) is a Jazz album by the Norwegian jazz violinist Ola Kvernberg. After the premiere at Trondheim Jazz Festival and concerts at Moldejazz feat. Joshua Redman and Oslo Jazz Festival, Kvernberg's commissioned work Liarbird is highly acclaimed.

Professional ratings
Review scores
Source	Rating
Dagbladet	6/6 stars
AllMusic	4.5/5 stars

== Reception ==
Liarbird was awarded Spellemannprisen 2011 for best Jazz album of the year, and the review by Norwegian newspaper Dagbladet awarded the album dice 6. The review by AllMusic awarded the album 4.5 stars.

== Track listing ==
No.	Title	Length
1.	"Liarbird"	9:09
2.	"Boog"	9:44
3.	"Boun´amina"	9:48
4.	"Wintermelon"	7:53
5.	"Vilje"	6:18
6.	"Olero"	8:01
7.	"Cobb"	9:03
8.	"Spannung"	6:11

== Musicians ==
- Ola Kvernberg - guitar, mandolin, bass, piano and percussion, in addition to their various fiddles
- Mathias Eick - trumpet
- Håkon Kornstad - saxophone
- Eirik Hegdal - saxophone
- Bergmund Waal Skaslien - viola
- Ingebrigt Håker Flaten - double bass, bass guitar and electronics
- Ole Morten Vågan - double bass, bass guitar and electronics
- Erik Nylander - drums and percussion
- Torstein Lofthus - drums
