= Grand General (album) =

2013 studio album by Grand General

Studio album by Ola Kvernberg Even Helte Hermansen Erlend Slettevoll Trond Frønes Kenneth Kapstad
- Released: 1 Feb 2013
- Recorded: 2012 at Øra Studio
- Genre: Modern jazz
- Length: 46:25
- Label: Rune Grammofon
- Producer: Grand General

Ola Kvernberg chronology
Liarbird (2011)	Grand General (2013)	Northern Tapes (2013)

Grand General (released 1 Feb 2013 in Oslo, Norway by label Rune Grammofon – RCD2139) is a Jazz rock album by the new Norwegian band Grand General, with violinist Ola Kvernberg.

== Review ==
This album is a heavy and melodic revelation from the new band Grand General consisting of some very prolific musicians from the Norwegian prog, jazz, rock scene. They started out as Kenneth Kapstad Group giving some gigs with this impressive lineup and is out with a more fitting name for their debut album. With the much gifted violinist Ola Kvernberg, who was awarded Jazz Spellemannprisen, the Norwegian Grammy, for his album Liarbird (2011). The lines to the Mahavishnu Orchestra is obvious, when trying to place Grand General in a musical perspective.

Professional ratings
Review scores
Source	Rating
AllMusic	4.5/5 stars

== Reception ==
The review by AllMusic critique Dave Lynch awarded the album 4.5 stars.

== Track listing ==
No.	Title	Length
1.	"Antics"	12:20
2.	"The Fall Of Troy"	6:30
3.	"Clandestine"	4:07
4.	"Tachyon"	6:24
5.	"Ritual"	6:02
6.	"Red Eye"	11:02

== Musicians ==
- Ola Kvernberg - violins & viola
- Even Helte Hermansen - guitar
- Erlend Slettevoll - keyboards
- Trond Frønes - bass
- Kenneth Kapstad - drums

== Notes ==
- Music written by Ola Kvernberg (tracks: #4 & #5) and Trond Frønes (tracks: #1–3 & #6)
- Mastered by Morten Stendahl at Redroom
- Produced by Grand General
- Recorded & mixed by Magnus Børmark at Øra Studio
- Sleeve by Kim Hiorthøy
