= The Torbjörn Zetterberg Hot Five =

Swedish post-bop band

The Torbjörn Zetterberg Hot Five is a post-bop quintet from Sweden. The band is led by upright bass player Torbjörn Zetterberg. In addition, it comprises Per "Texas" Johansson, Jonas Kullhammar, Ludvig Berghe, and Daniel Fredriksson.

The Torbjörn Zetterberg Hot Five is fairly widespread recognition in Europe, but is relatively unknown in North America. Their music can be described as post-bop with both classic jazz and avantgarde influences. Kullhammar and Zetterberg are both mainstays of the Swedish jazz scene. Kullhammar is also an accomplished band leader in his own right, fronting the Jonas Kullhammar Quartet. The group has toured Vietnam, Germany, Greece, Norway, Canada, Denmark and Sweden.

== Lineup ==
- Daniel Fredriksson - drums
- Jonas Kullhammar - saxophone
- Ludvig Berghe - piano
- Per 'Texas' Johansson - saxophone
- Torbjörn Zetterberg - double bass

== Discography ==
- Hela Sveriges lilla fästmö (2002)
- The Torbjörn Zetterberg Hot Five (2002)
- Förtjänar mer pppmärksamhet (2004)
