= Ole Mofjell =

Norwegian drummer (born 1990)

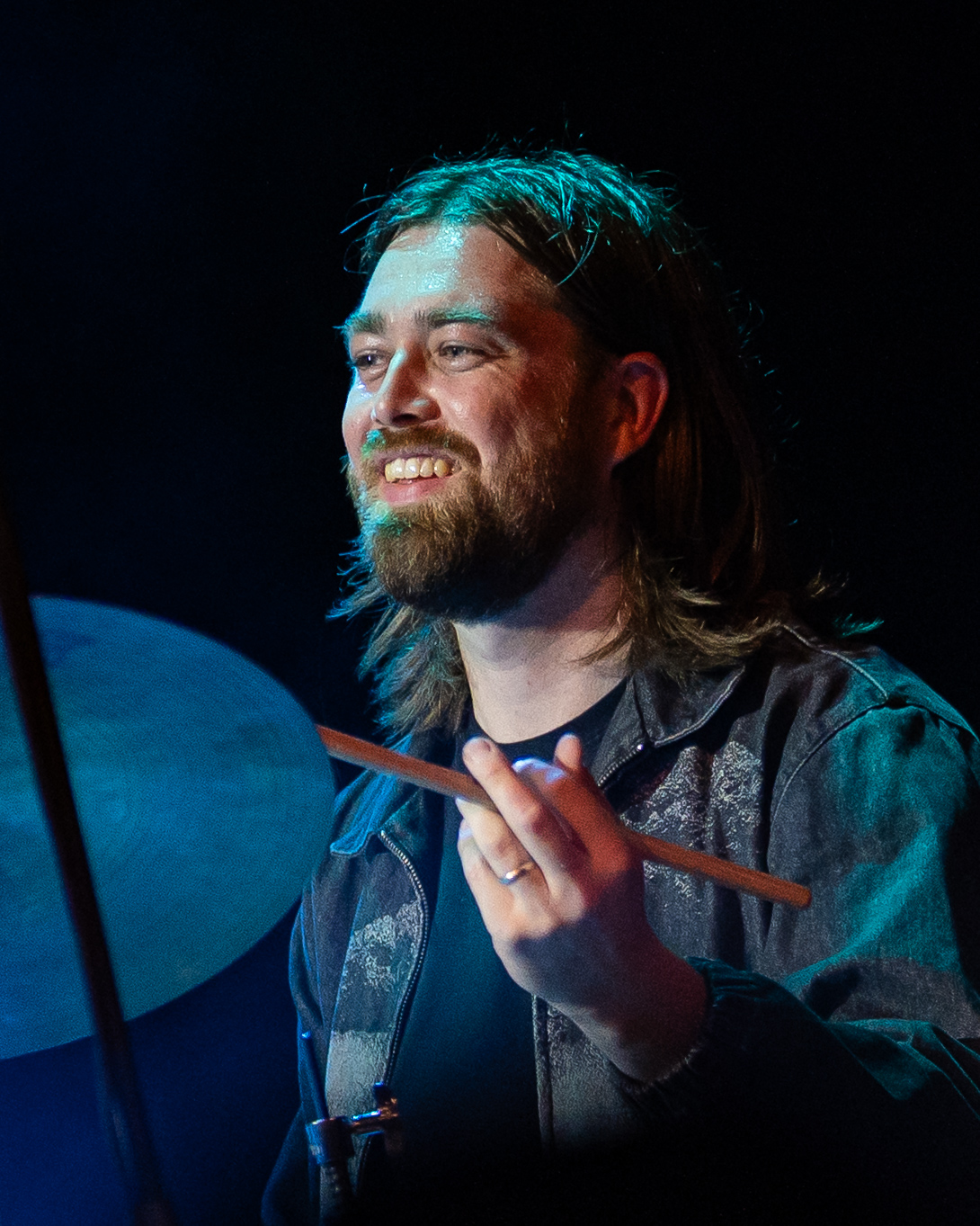
- Ole Mofjell, 2025

Background information
- Born: 11 July 1990 (age 36); Søgne Municipality, Vest-Agder
- Origin: Norway
- Genre: Jazz
- Occupations: Musician, composer
- Instrument: Drums

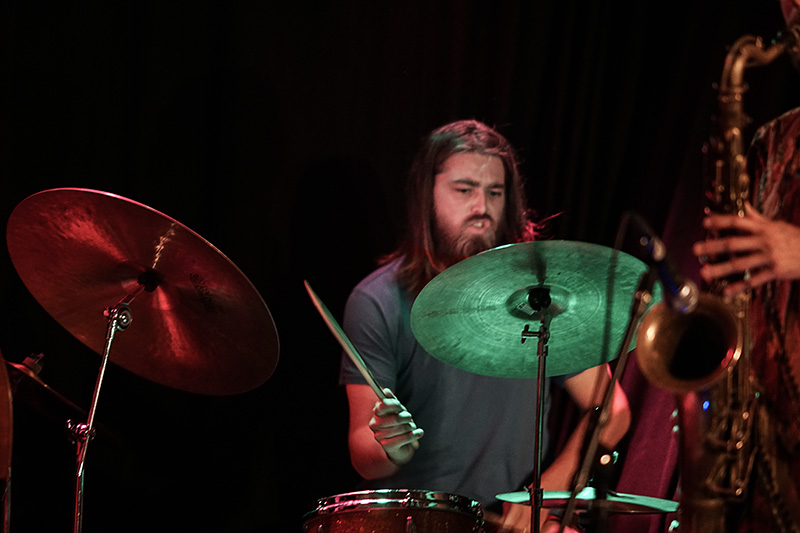
Ole Mofjell at Copenhagen Jazz Festival 2018

Ole Mofjell (born 1990) is a Norwegian drummer and composer from Søgne Municipality, Norway.

== Career ==
Mofjell studied at the Jazz Programme at the Norwegian University of Science and Technology (NTNU) in the early 2010s. During this period he collaborated with vocalist Natalie Sandtorv and keyboardist Marte Eberson, including through the groups Morning Has Occurred and COKKO. Mofjell later married Sandtorv, and the two have continued to collaborate on musical projects and recordings.

Throughout the 2010s, Mofjell also performed with groups such as Brute Force and One Out of Town, as well as the improvisational duo Tysk Impro with trumpeter Erik Kimestad Pedersen. Together with vocalist Marcela Lucatelli and bassist Felipe Zenicola, he formed the trio Oral, which released its self-titled debut album in 2018. The group's music combined elements of free improvisation, grindcore and no wave.

During the 2020s, Mofjell has been involved in jazz and improvisational projects, including Emmeluth's Amoeba, Weejuns, Broken Compass, Audun Automat and Bonanza of Doom. His collaborations include free improvisation, experimental jazz, noise-based music and electrically amplified improvisational music. Through these projects he has worked with musicians such as Hedvig Mollestad, Ståle Storløkken, Signe Emmeluth, Frode Gjerstad, Audun Ellingsen and Karl Bjorå.

Together with Martin Myhre Olsen and Henrik Sandstad Dalen, Mofjell is a member of the trio 3 Days of Maceration. The project draws inspiration from the experimental jazz scene that emerged around New York City's Loft scene during the 1970s.

In 2025, he was appointed artist-in-residence at the inaugural Kristiansand Jazz Festival, where he presented the commissioned work Square, a solo percussion and gong performance, and a concert with Emmeluth's Amoeba.

Since 2026, Mofjell has been a member of Krokofant.

== Honors ==
- 2015: Recipient of the Sparebanken Sør Musikkpris

== Discography ==
=== Solo ===
- 2015: Rob Void 3.0 (Nonfigurativ Musikk)

=== Within Brute Force ===
- 2013: Brute Force (Va Fongool)

=== Within COKKO ===
- 2016: Cokko (Va Fongool)

=== Within Oral ===
- 2018: Oral

=== Within Emmeluths Amoeba ===
- 2018: Polyp (Øra Fonogram)
- 2019: Chimaera (Øra Fonogram)
- 2024: Nonsense (Moserobie Music Production)
- 2026: With Love (Moserobie Music Production)

=== Within Weejuns ===
- 2023: Weejuns (Rune Grammofon)
- 2026: Bitches Blues

=== Within Broken Compass ===
- 2023: Broken Compass (Circulasione Totale)

=== Within Bonanza of Doom ===
- 2023: Bonanza of Doom (Sheep Chase Records)

=== Within Audun Automat ===
- 2024: Uflaks (AMP Music & Records)

=== Within 3 Days of Maceration ===
- 2024: First Press (Botrytis Records)

=== Contributing to ===
- 2017: Nypan – Stereotomic (Losen Records)
- 2017: Natalie Sandtorv – Freedom Nation (Øra Fonogram)
- 2019: The Big YES! – The Big YES! (Nakama Records)
- 2019: Elīna Silova – Atzīšanās (self-published)
- 2019: Tuvaband – I Entered the Void (Brilliance Records)
- 2020: Neon Ion – Heart Echoes (Jazzland Recordings)
- 2020: Hedvig Mollestad – Ekhidna, percussion
- 2021: LOPLOP – LOPLOP (Clean Feed Records)
- 2026: Neon Ion – Laugh Now, Cry Later (Jazzland Recordings)
