= Trond Frønes =

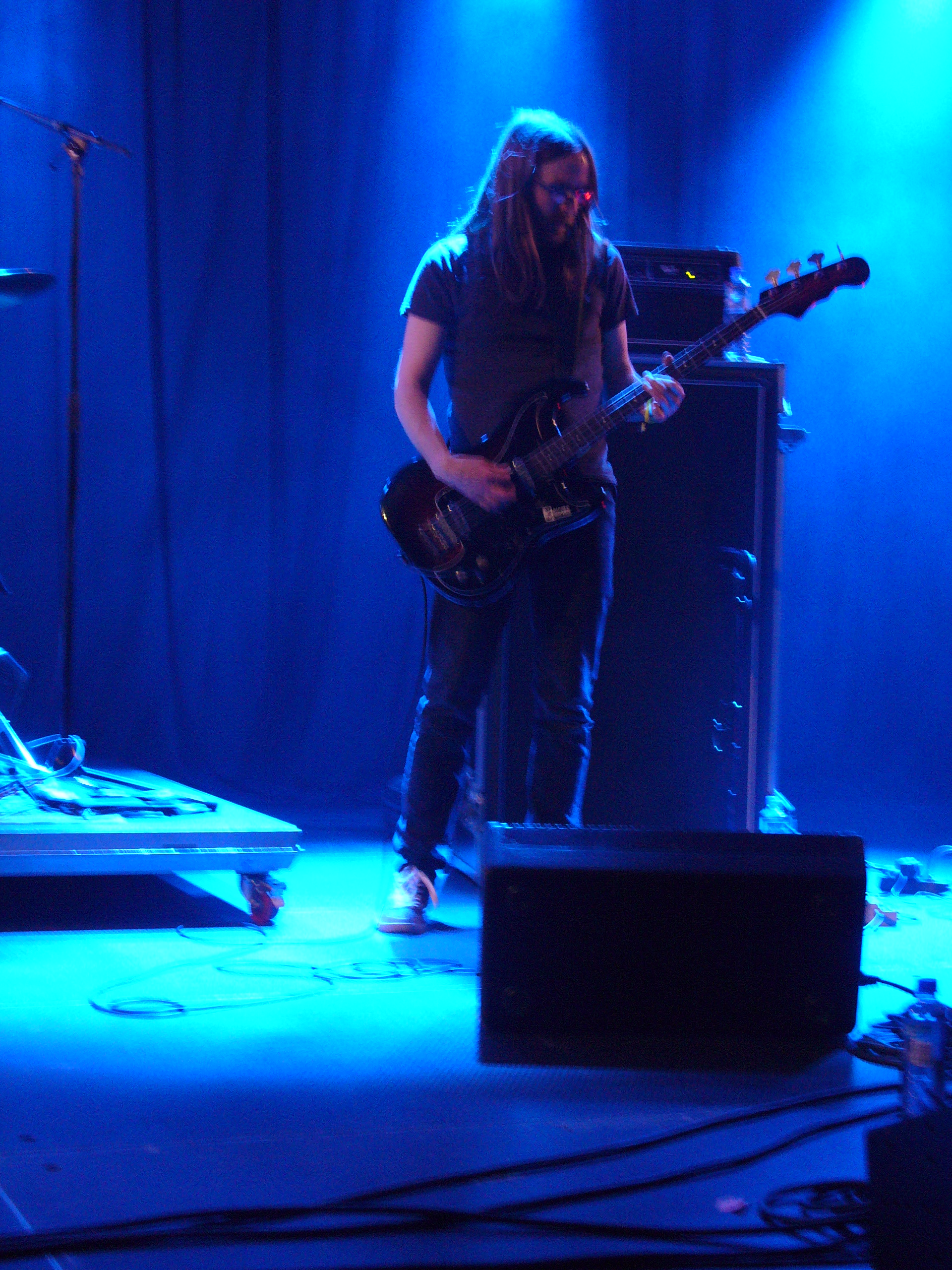
- Trond Frønes with Grand General at Vossajazz 2014.

Background information
- Born: 1978 (age 47–48); Trondheim, Sør-Trøndelag
- Origin: Norwegian
- Genres: Jazz and rock music
- Occupation: Musician
- Instrument: Bass

Trond Frønes (born 1978 in Trondheim, Norway) is a Norwegian (bass guitarist), known from bands like Blood on Wheels, Goat The Head, Grand General and Sunswitch.

== Career ==
Frønes has collaborated with musicians like Ola Kvernberg, Even Helte Hermansen, Erlend Slettevoll and Kenneth Kapstad, and had a central position in the Norwegian band Cadillac and Jerryville from 1999.

== Discography ==
Within Cadillac

- 2001: Cure (Progress Records)
- 2002: Convertible Candy (Progress Records)
- 2004: Magnetic City (Kong Tiki)

Within Goat The Head

- 2010: Doppelgängers (Aftermath Music)
- 2011: Wicked Mimicry (Left Horn Records)

Within Blood on Wheels

- 2012: Blood on Wheels (Left Horn Records)

Within Sunswitch

- 2012: Sunswitch (Riot Factory)

Within Grand General

- 2013: Grand General (Rune Grammofon)

With Gunnhild Sundli

- 2013: Tankerop (EMI Music Norway)
