= Jonas Kullhammar =

Swedish jazz composer and saxophonist

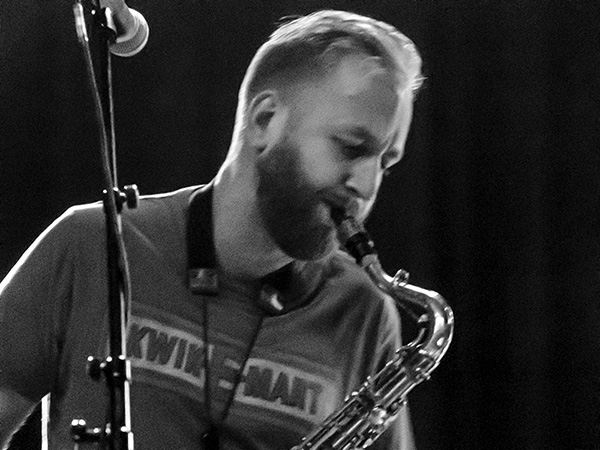
- Jonas Kullhammar at U Jazz festival in Aarhus, Denmark 2014

Background information
- Also known as: Ludi McSkank
- Born: 2 September 1978 (age 47); Nacka, Stockholm
- Origin: Sweden
- Genres: Jazz
- Occupations: Musician, composer
- Instrument: Saxophone
- Labels: Clean Feed; Moserobie Music Production
- Website: www.kullhammar.com

Jonas Kullhammar (2 September 1978 in Nacka, Sweden) is a Swedish jazz composer, saxophonist and is one of Sweden's most established jazz musicians.

== Career ==
Since 1998 his main group has been Jonas Kullhammar Quartet, and he has participated on over 150 records as a sideman. In year 2000 he released his debut recording, the self-produced "Salut". It won him Sweden Radio's Jazz Cat award as the newcomer of the year. He also received the Django D'or award and received the price Sweden Radio's Jazz Cat as Jazz Musician of The Year in Sweden two years in a row. The group also received the award for jazz group of the year. Since then the band has toured around the world and released more CDs. Jonas is also a founding member of the groups Kullrusk and Nacka Forum. Since 2000 he runs the record label Moserobie, that releases mainly Swedish and Norwegian jazz groups.

Kullhammar has worked with artists and bands The (International) Noise Conspiracy, Carlos Garnett, Nicolai Dunger, Fredrik Norén Band, The Torbjörn Zetterberg Hot Five, Sonic Mechatronik Arkestra, Peanuts Hucko, The Plan, Nina Ramsby, Goran Kajfes, Marcus Strickland, Eldkvarn, Jupiter Trio, The Core, Mulatu Astatke, Salem Al Fakir, The Hives, Ted Curson, Chick Corea, Jason Moran, Dungen, Rickie Lee Jones and many more.

== Honors ==
- 2000: Stallbröderna award
- 2001: Aftonbladets "Jazz musician of the year"
- 2004: Django d'Or award (Contemporary star of jazz)
- 2006: Arne Domnérus Guldsaxen Award
- 2008: Alice Babs Award
- 200: Svenska Jazzriksförbundets "Kjell-Ake Svensson" Award
- 200: Sigma award, co:Ellington society
- 200: Sandrew "Tore Browaldh" award
- 2014: Royal music academy "Jazz award"
- 2014: Guldbaggen award (Swedish equivalent to an Oscar) for best film music, for the film Gentlemen
- 2016: Lars Gullin-award
- 2017: Jan Johansson-award

== Swedish jazz critics "Jazzkatten" awards ==
- 2000: Newcomer of the year
- 2002: Jazz Artist of The Year
- 2002: Jazz Group Of The Year (Jonas Kullhammar Quartet)
- 2003: Jazz Artist of The Year

== Nominations for the Swedish grammy ==
- 2002: with Nacka Forum
- 2003: with JKQ for Plays Loud for The People
- 2004: with Kullrusk
- 2005: with JKQ & NBB - Snake City North
- 2006: with JKQ - Son of a Drummer
- 2009: with JKQ - The Half Naked Truth
- 2013: with JKQ - Låt det vara
- 2014: for "Gentlemen - original motion picture jazz tracks"

== Nominations for the manifest award ==
- 2006: with JKQ - Son of a Drummer
- 2009: with JKQ - The Half Naked Truth

== Selected discography ==
=== Solo albums ===
With Jonas Kullhammar Quartet

- 2000: Salut (Moserobie Music Production)
- 2001: The Soul Of Jonas Kullhammar (Moserobie Music Production)
- 2003: Plays Loud For The People (Moserobie Music Production)
- 2005: Snake City North (Moserobie Music Production), with Norrbotten Big Band
- 2006: Son Of A Drummer (Moserobie Music Production)
- 2009: The Half Naked Truth (Moserobie Music Production) (limited edition 8 cd box)
- 2010: Från Och Med Herr Jonas Kullhammar (Moserobie Music Production)
- 2013: Låt Det Vara (Moserobie Music Production)
- 2013: Plays A Love Supreme EP (Moserobie Music Production) (limited edition 10" LP)
- 2013: This Is The End (Moserobie Music Production) (limited edition 8 yellow 180g vinyl)

Original motion picture jazz tracks

- 2014: Gentlemen (Moserobie Music Production)

=== Collaborations ===
With Jansson/Kullhammar/Nilssen-Love

- 2002: Live At Glenn Miller Vol.1 (Ayler Records)

With Nacka Forum

- 2002: Nacka Forum (Moserobie Music Production)
- 2005: Leve Nacka Forum (Moserobie Music Production)
- 2012: Fee Fi Fo Rum (Moserobie Music Production)
- 2014: Live In Tokyo (Moserobie Music Production), featuring Akira Sakata

With Kullrusk duo with Per "Ruskträsk" Johansson

- 2004: Kullrusk (Moserobie Music Production)
- 2006: Spring Spring Spring Spring Spring (Moserobie Music Production)
- 2008: Digital (Moserobie Music Production)

With Fredriksson, Kullhammar & Zetterberg

- 2005: Gyldene Tider Vol.1 (Moserobie Music Production)
- 2005: Gyldene Tider Vol.2 (Moserobie Music Production)
- 2005: Gyldene Tider Vol.3 (Moserobie Music Production)

With Jupiter Trio including with Håvard Stubø, Magnus Forsberg, Steinar Nickelsen featuring Jonas Kullhammar

- 2006: Live At Glenn Miller Café (AIM Records)
- 2007: III2 (Bolage Records)

With Kullhammar-Osgood-Vågan

- 2007: Andratx (Moserobie Music Production)
- 2009: Andratx Live (Moserobie Music Production)

With Pinton/Kullhammar/Zetterberg/Nordeson

- 2009: Chant (Clean Feed)

With Nicolai Dunger

- 2010: The Original Motion Picture Soundtrack: Vallmo (Moserobie Music Production)

With Fredrik Kronkvist Sextet including Martin Sjöstedt, Petter Eldh, Raynald Colom and Snorre Kirk

- 2011: Improvised Action (Connective Records)

With Fiske/Kullhammar/Zetterberg/Holmegard

- 2012: Svenska Kaputt (Moserobie Music Production)

With Kulhammar/Aalberg/Zetterberg

- 2012: Basement Sessions Vol. 1 (Clean Feed)
- 2013: Basement Sessions Vol. 2 (Clean Feed)

With Kullhammar, Mathisen, Zetterberg, Aalberg

- 2014: Basement Sessions Vol. 3 - The Ljubljana Tapes (Clean Feed)

With Hegge

- 2017: Vi är ledsna men du får inte längre vara barn (Particular Recordings Collective)
