= Kenneth Kapstad =

Norwegian drummer (born 1979)

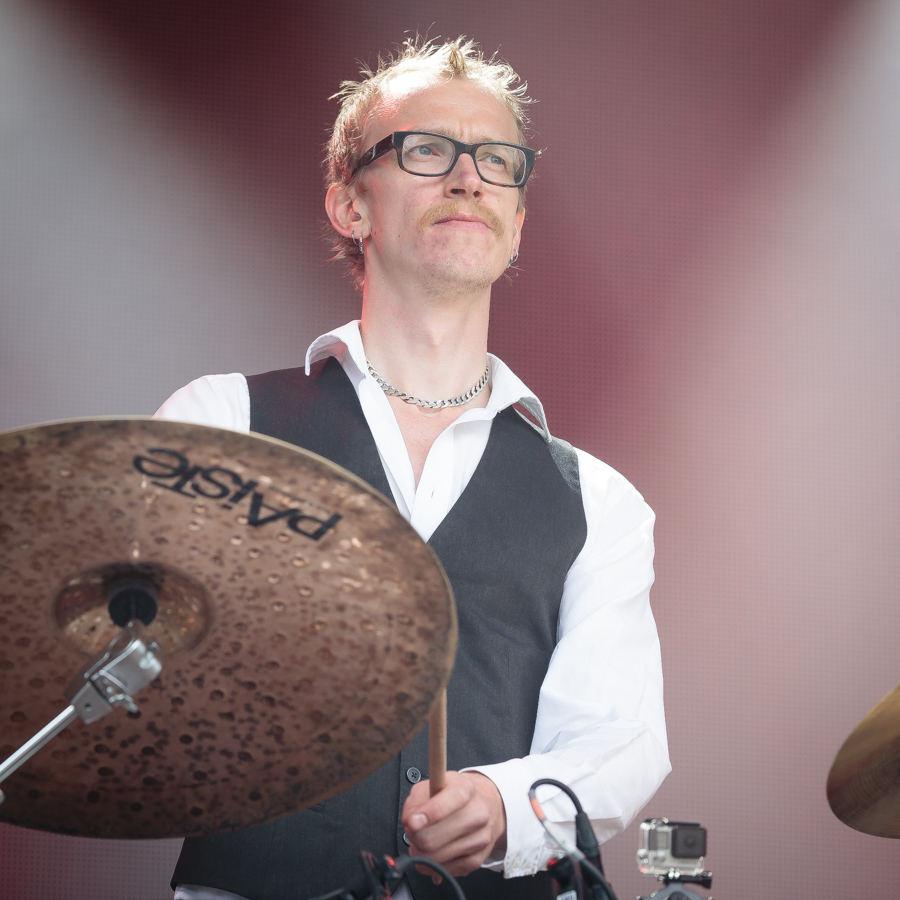
- Kapstad performing at Over Oslo 2018

Background information
- Born: 20 April 1979 (age 47); Løkken Verk, Meldal Municipality, Norway
- Genres: Rock, jazz
- Occupation: Drummer
- Labels: Reflect, Jazzaway, Curling Legs
- Website: kennethkapstad.no

Kenneth Kapstad (born 20 April 1979) is a Norwegian musician from Trondheim, known as the drummer of the band Gåte (2004–2005), Motorpsycho (2007–2016), and God Seed (2012–2015), and for his collaborations with the bands Animal Alpha, Goat the Head, and Monolithic.

== Career ==
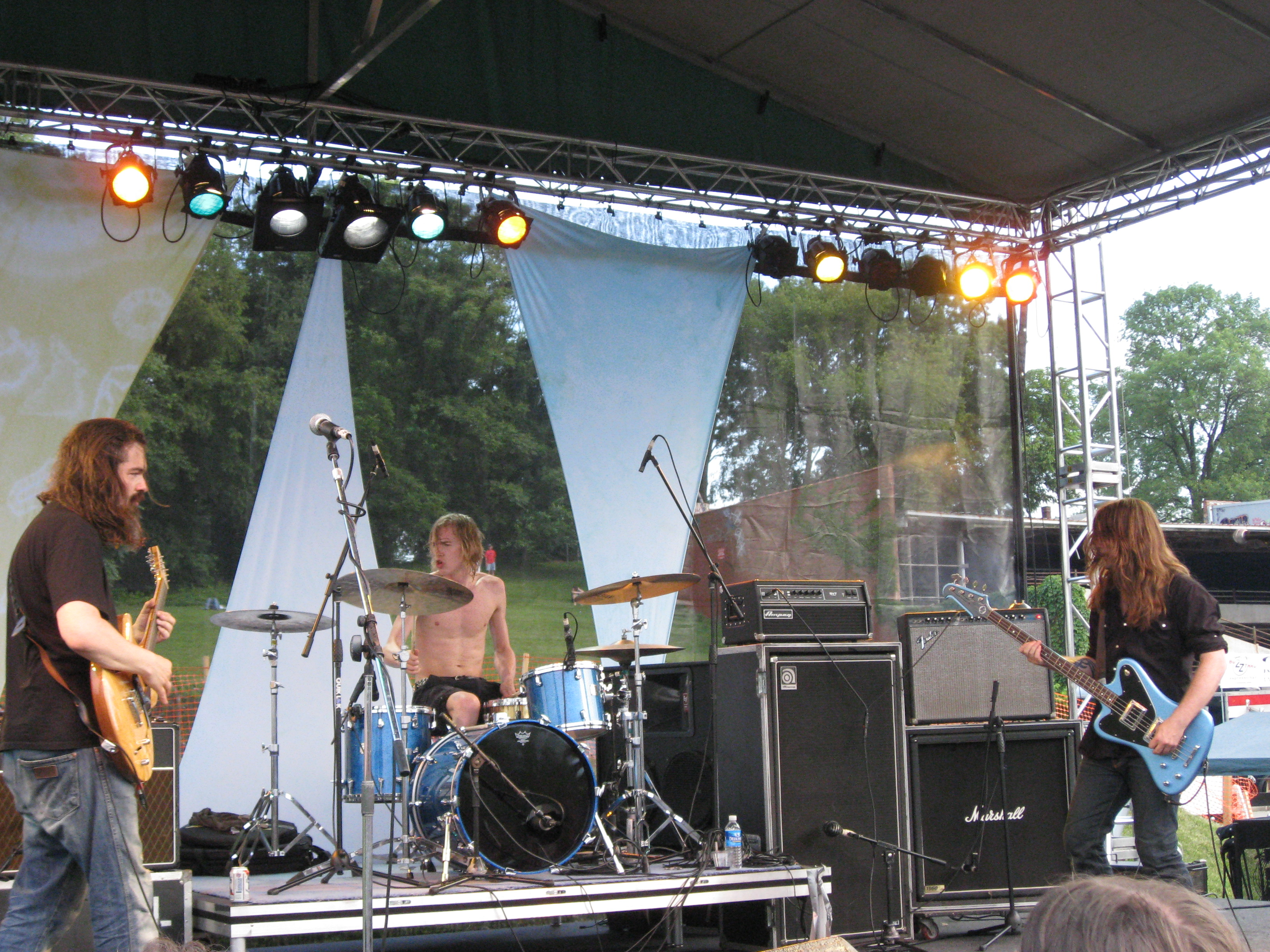
Motorpsycho

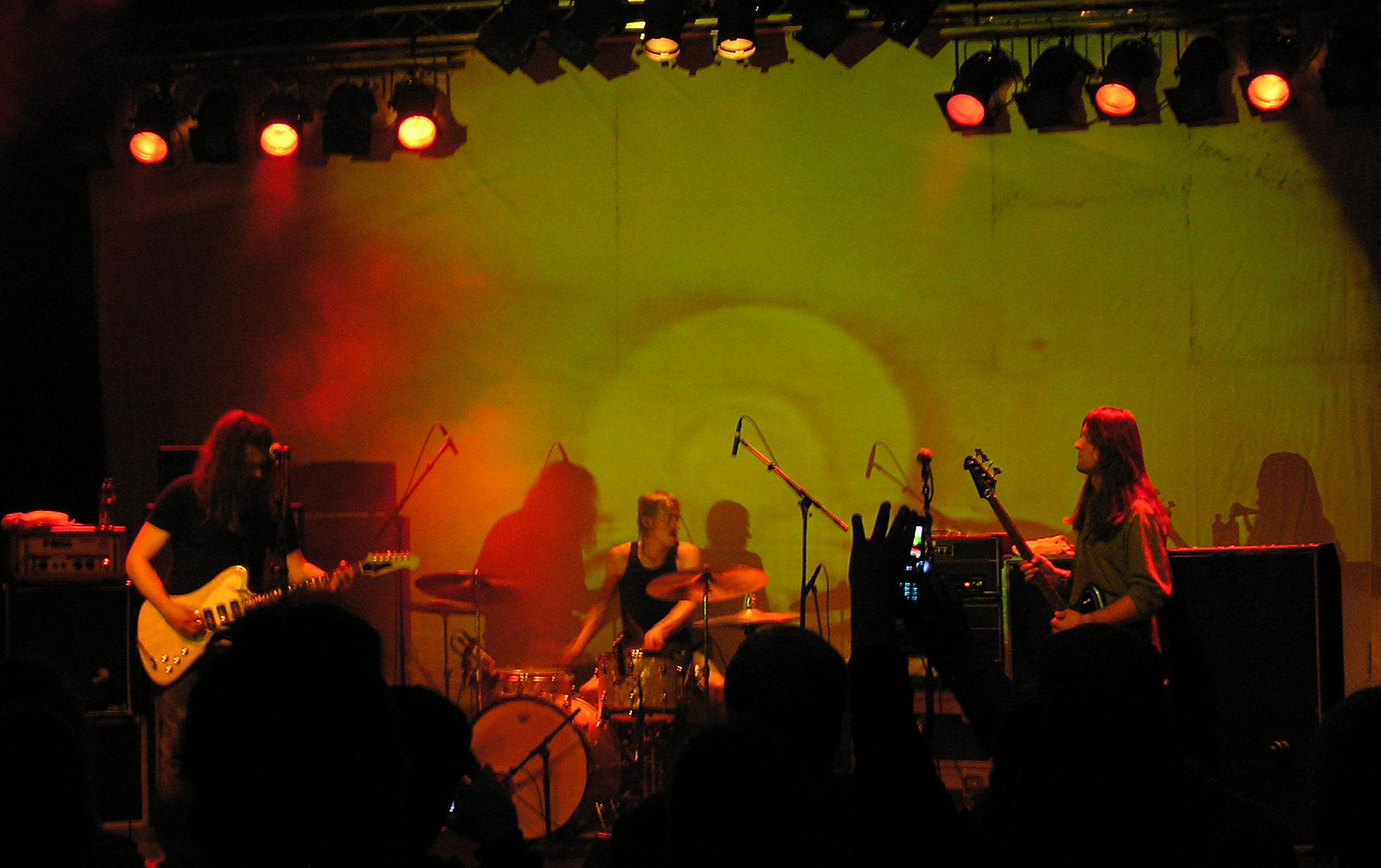
Motorpsycho with Kenneth Kapstad central, live at Studenten, Steinkjer, 2008

Kapstad was born in Løkken Verk. He attended the music program at Orkdal secondary school, two years on Sund Folkehøgskole, a year at the conservatory in Agder Musikkonservatorium, and four years on the Jazz program at Trondheim Musikkonservatorium (2001–05).

After the phenomenal success within Gåte, that ended just when it started to take off, Kapstad joined Motorpsycho duo guitarist Hans Magnus Ryan and bassist Bent Sæther in 2007. He spent nearly ten years with the band before parting ways in 2016. He also collaborates within bands like Dadafon (2003–2004), Cucumber (2004–2005), African Pepperbirds (2004–2006), Monolithic (2005–), Goat the Head (2005–), Animal Alpha (2006–2007), Thorns (2006–), Martin Hagfors (2008–), Møster! (2010–), Grand General (2010–), God Seed (2011–), Resjemheia (2011–), and Spidergawd (2013–).

== Discography ==
With God Seed

Within Dadafon

- 2004: My Brother's Comeback (Universal Records)
- 2004: Harbour (Universal Records)
- 2004: And So We Have to Say Goodbye (Dadafon self–released)

Within Motorpsycho

- 2008: Little Lucid Moments (Rune Grammofon)
- 2008: Roadwork Vol. 3: The Four Norsemen of the Apocalypse (included in the double DVD release "Haircuts")
- 2009: Child of the Future
- 2010: Heavy Metal Fruit (Rune Grammofon)
- 2011: Roadwork Vol. 4 – Intrepid Skronk (Rune Grammofon)
- 2011: Strings of Stroop – Motorpsycho Live at Effenaar (limited edition vinyl)
- 2012: The Death Defying Unicorn (Stickman Records, Germany), with Ståle Storløkken
- 2013: Still Life with Eggplant (Rune Grammofon)
- 2014: Behind the Sun (Rune Grammofon)
- 2016: Here Be Monsters (Stickman Records)
- 2016: Here Be Monsters Vol.2 (Stickman Records)

Within Goat the Head

- 2007: Simian Supremacy (Tabu Recordings)
- 2010: Doppelgängers (Aftermath Music)
- 2011: Wicked Mimicry (Left Horn Records)

Within Grand General

- 2013: Grand General (Rune Grammofon)

With other projects

- 2004: No Slumber (Bergland Prod.), within Cucumber
- 2005: Haiglaits: Farvel Og På Gjensyn (EMI Music, Norway), with Are Og Odin
- 2006: Cape Point (Bergland Prod.), with Afric Pepperbirds
- 2008: You Pay for the Whole Seat, But You'll Only Need the Edge (Racing Junior), with Animal Alpha
- 2008: E.S.P. (Extended Sensory Play), with 22
- 2009: Men and Flies (Me Records), with Martin Hagfors
- 2009: Black Science (Roggbif Records), within Monolithic (Stian Westerhus)
