= Grand General (band) =

Norwegian jazz-fusion band

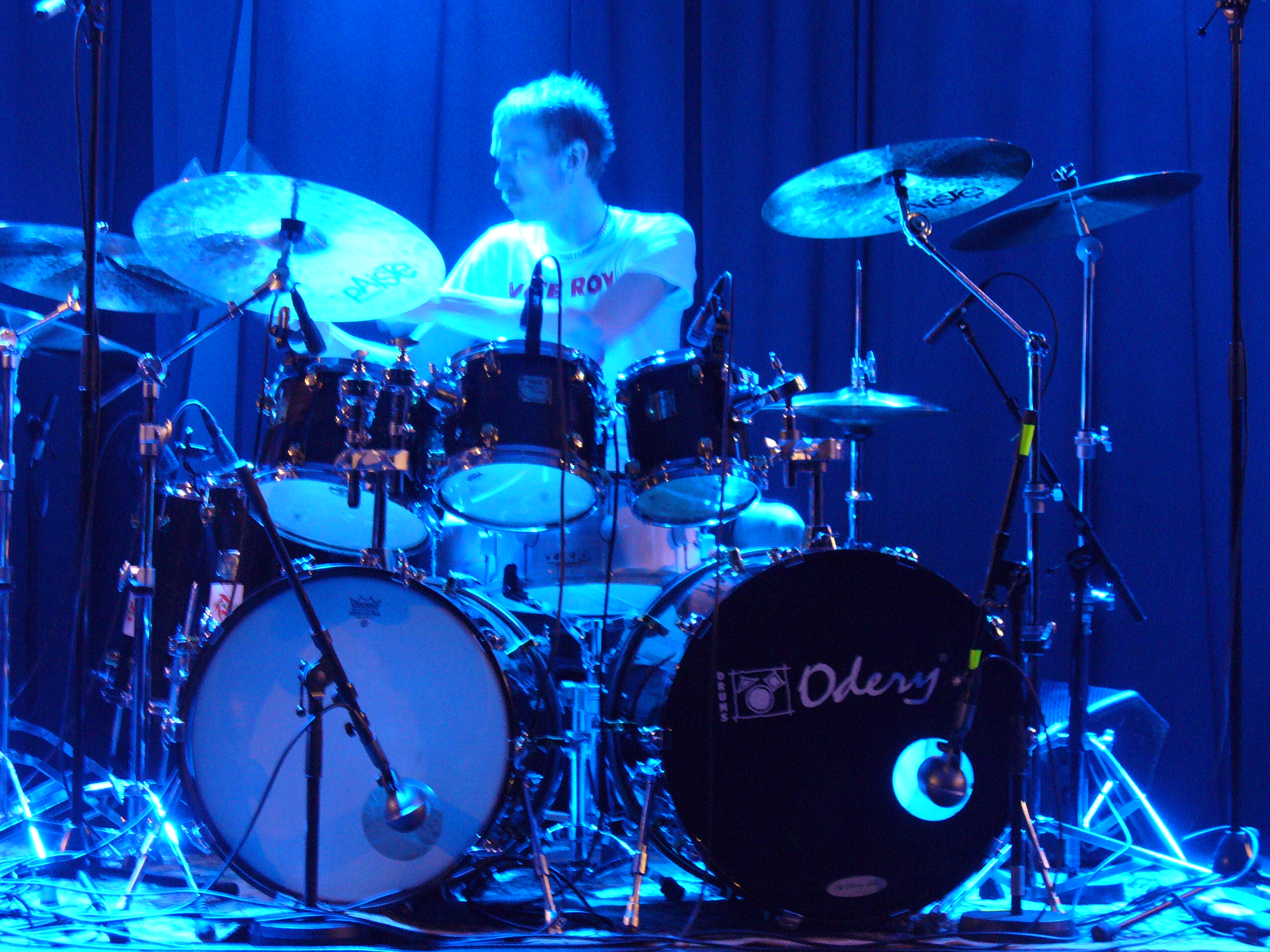
- Kenneth Kapstad and Grand General at Vossajazz April 11, 2014.

Background information
- Origin: Norway
- Genres: Jazz rock, progressive rock
- Years active: 2010–present
- Label: Rune Grammofon
- Members: Ola Kvernberg; Even Helte Hermansen; Erlend Slettevoll; Trond Frønes; Kenneth Kapstad

Grand General (initiated 2010 in Trondheim as Kenneth Kapstad Group) are a Norwegian jazz-fusion band that consists of drummer Kenneth Kapstad (former member of Gåte and Motorpsycho), bassist Trond Frønes, keyboardist Erlend Slettevoll, guitarist Even Helte Hermansen, and violinist Ola Kvernberg.

== Biography ==
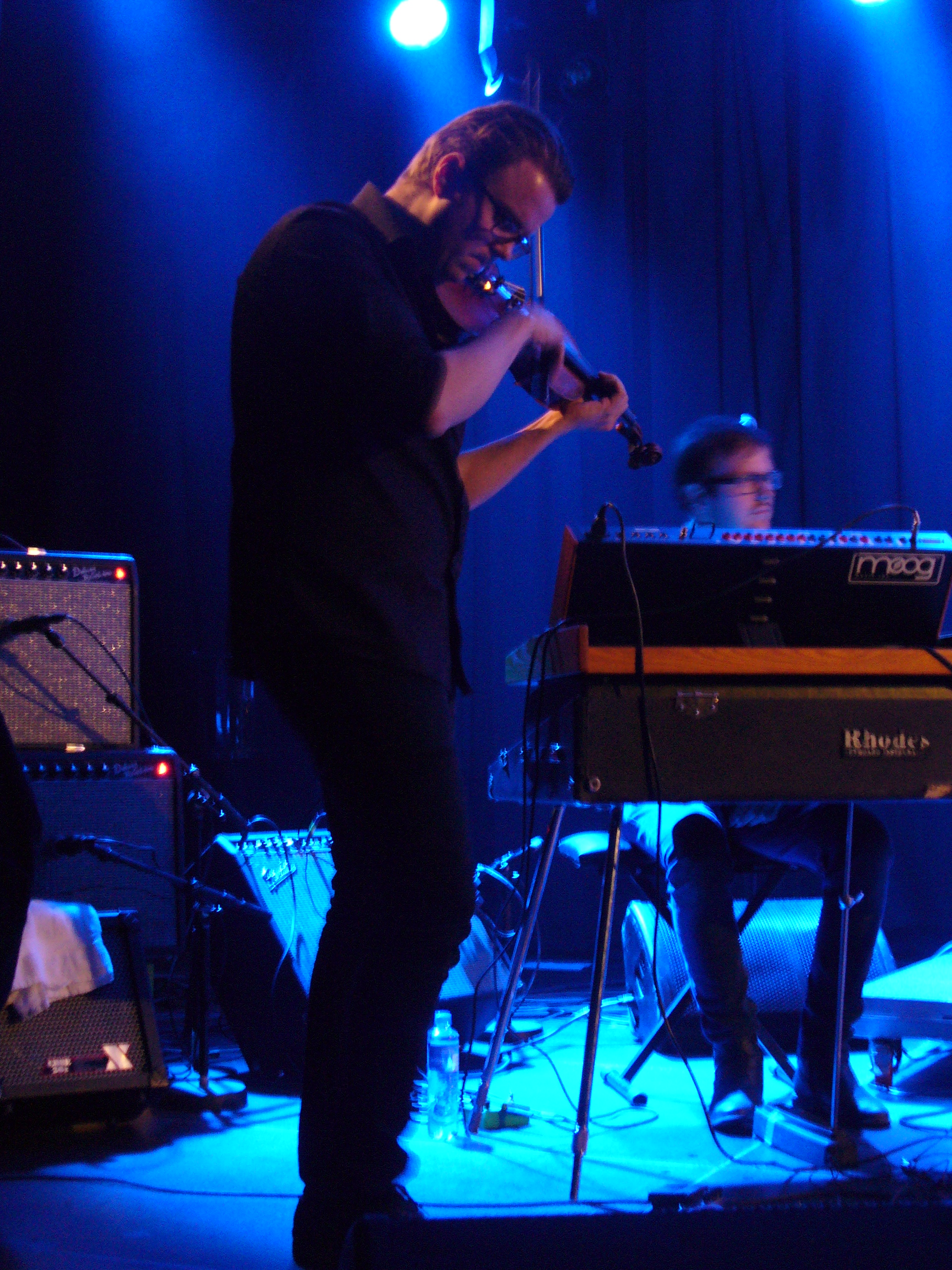
Ola Kvernberg in front, with Erlend Slettevoll and Grand General at Vossajazz 2014.

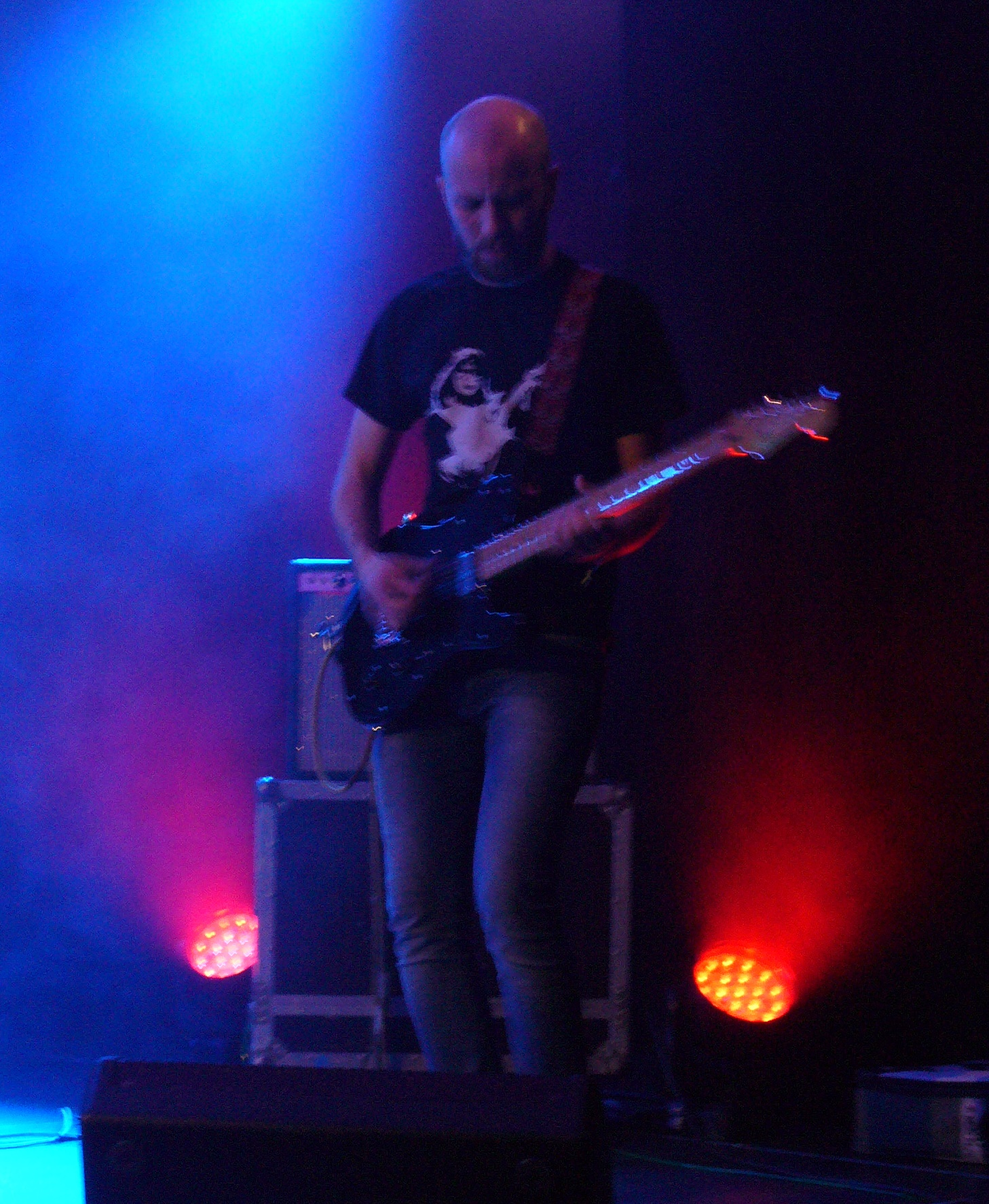
Even Helte Hermansen with Grand General at Vossajazz 2014.

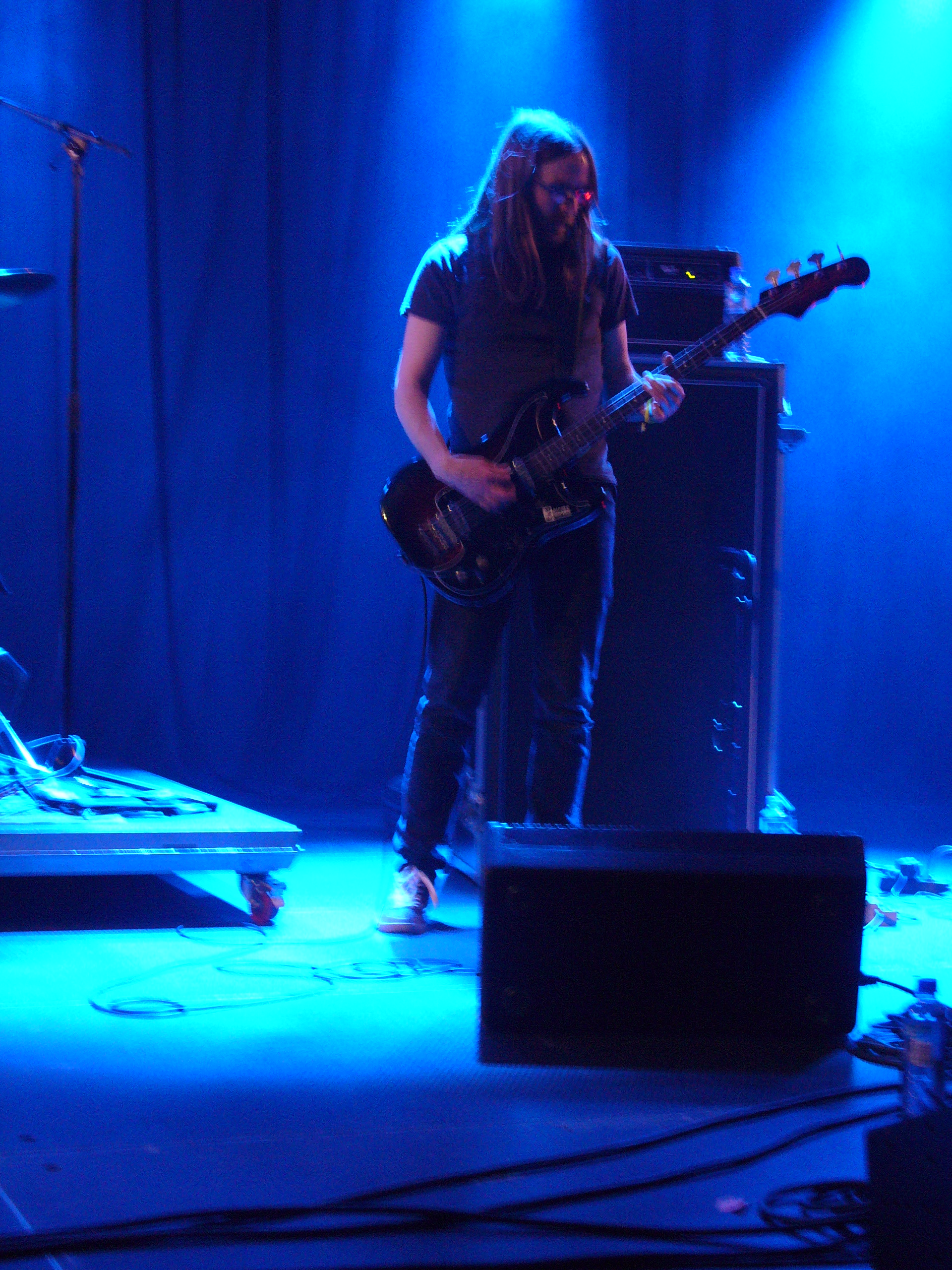
Trond Frønes with Grand General at Vossajazz 2014.

This is another heavy Norwegian fusion quintet becoming Grand General after premiering as the Kenneth Kapstad Group at the Trondheim Jazzfest in 2010. In addition to Kapstad, the band comprises bassist Trond Frønes, a fellow member of the metal band Goat The Head, and contemporary jazz musicians like violinist Ola Kvernberg, pianist Erlend Slettevoll and guitarist Even Helte Hermansen known from the jazz rock band Bushman's Revenge and also a collaborator on the jazz metal album Blackjazz by Shining among other collaborations. They released their debut self-titled album Grand General in February 2013, consisting of six tracks which could be interpreted as a modern, clearer and more metal approach on music made by Steve Morse of Dixie Dregs or Mahavishnu Orchestra for example.

== Band members ==
- Ola Kvernberg - violin
- Even Helte Hermansen - guitar
- Erlend Slettevoll - keyboard
- Trond Frønes - bass
- Kenneth Kapstad - drums

== Discography ==
- 2013: Grand General (Rune Grammofon)
