= Marte Eberson =

Norwegian keyboardist and composer (born 1987)

Marte Maaland Eberson
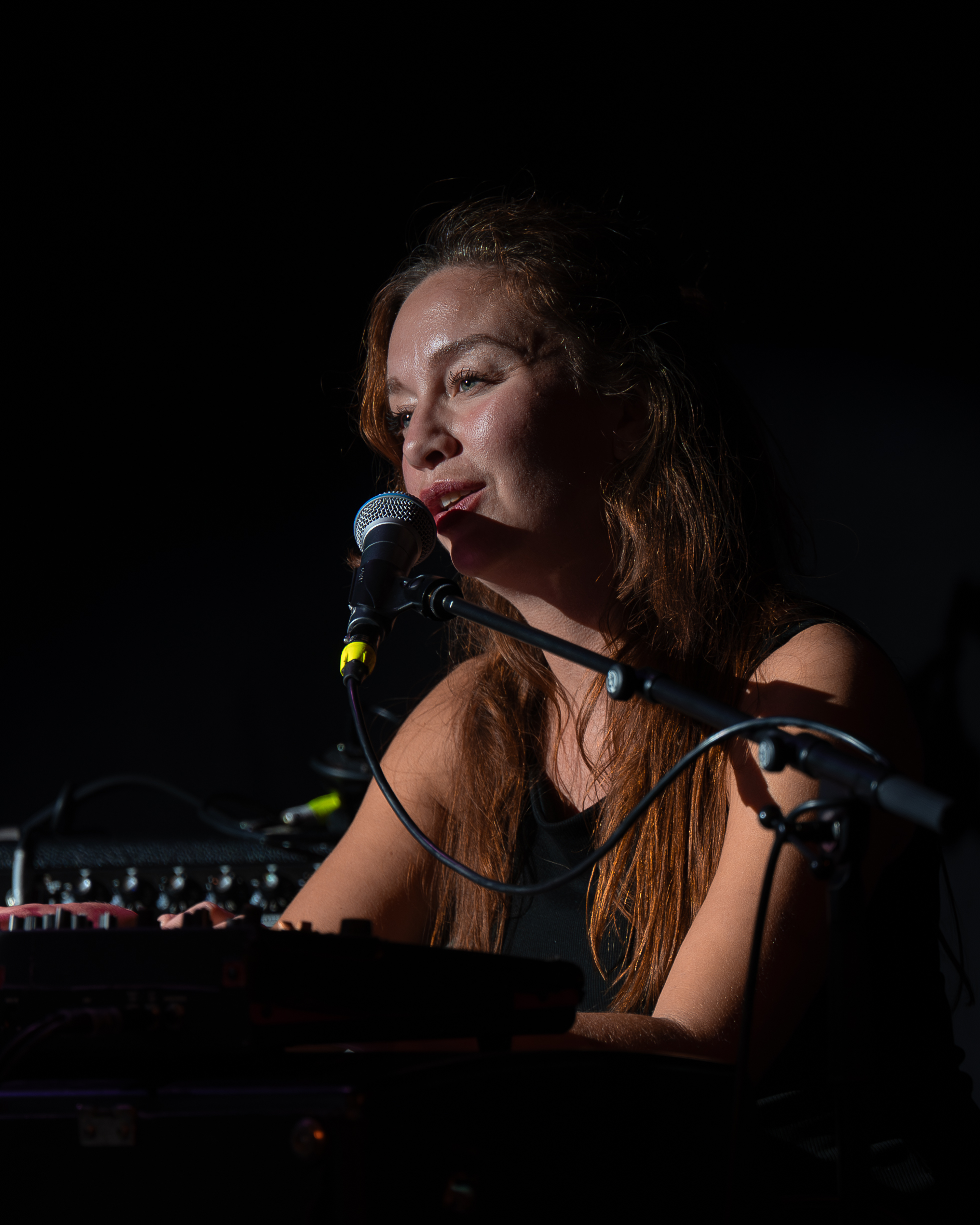
- Marte Eberson in 2025.

Background information
- Born: 12 December 1987 (age 38); Oslo, Norway
- Genres: Jazz
- Occupations: Musician, composer
- Instrument: Keyboards
- Label: Universal Music

Marte Maaland Eberson (born 12 December 1987) is a Norwegian keyboardist and composer, known from bands including Morning Has Occurred and Highasakite. She is the daughter of the guitarist Jon Eberson.

== Career ==
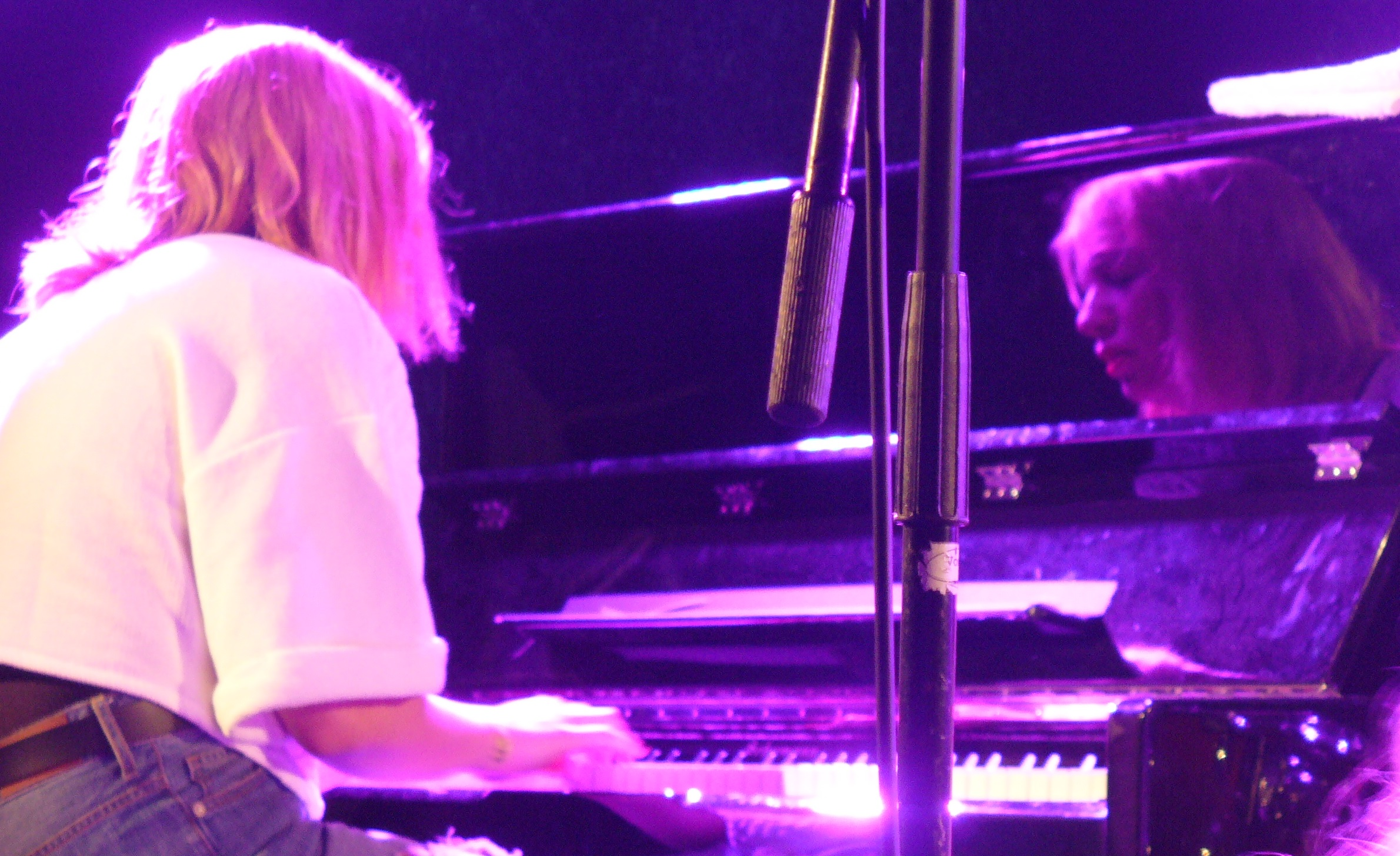
Marte Eberson at Voss 2014.

Eberson was born in Oslo, and obtained her formal musical education from the Music program at Foss videregående skole, "Sund Folkehøgskole", followed by a bachelor's degree from the Jazz program at Griegakademiet (UiB) in Bergen. She is involved in many different bands and various musical contexts, most recently with the band Eberson Funk Ensemble, a band including her guitarist father Jon Eberson, Pål Thowsen, Sigurd Hole and Kim Erik Pedersen at Victoria, the Norwegian National Jazz Scene in Oslo 2013.

In 2011, Eberson won the "Jazz i sikte" ("Jazz in sight") with the band Lugom Trio and placed second in the "Urørt" final with the electronica duo Machine Birds. In 2012, she won the "Jazz i sikte" with the ensemble Morning Has Occurred, fronted by Natalie Sandtorv. Also in 2012, she was awarded the Sildajazzprisen. She was also a member of the critically acclaimed indie band Highasakite until 2018, and has been playing with Sjur Miljeteig Group since 2014.

== Honors ==
- 2012: Sildajazzprisen

== Discography ==
=== Solo albums ===
- 2015: Mad Boy (Propeller Recordings)

=== Collaborations ===
With Machine Birds

- 2012: Save Yourself (Nabovarsel)
- 2013: Time / One Last Try (Machine Birds Records)

With Ine Hoem

- 2013: "The Island"

With Highasakite

- 2012: All That Floats Will Rain (Propeller Recordings)
- 2014: Silent Treatment (Propeller Recordings)
- 2016: "Camp Echo" (Propeller Recordings)

With Morning Has Occurred

- 2014: Morning Has Occurred (Ocean Sound Recordings)

With Eberson Funk Ensemble

- 2014: Do The Dance (JEG Records)

With Cokko

- 2016: The Dance Upon My Grave (Playdate Records)
