= Kjetil Møster =

Norwegian jazz musician and composer

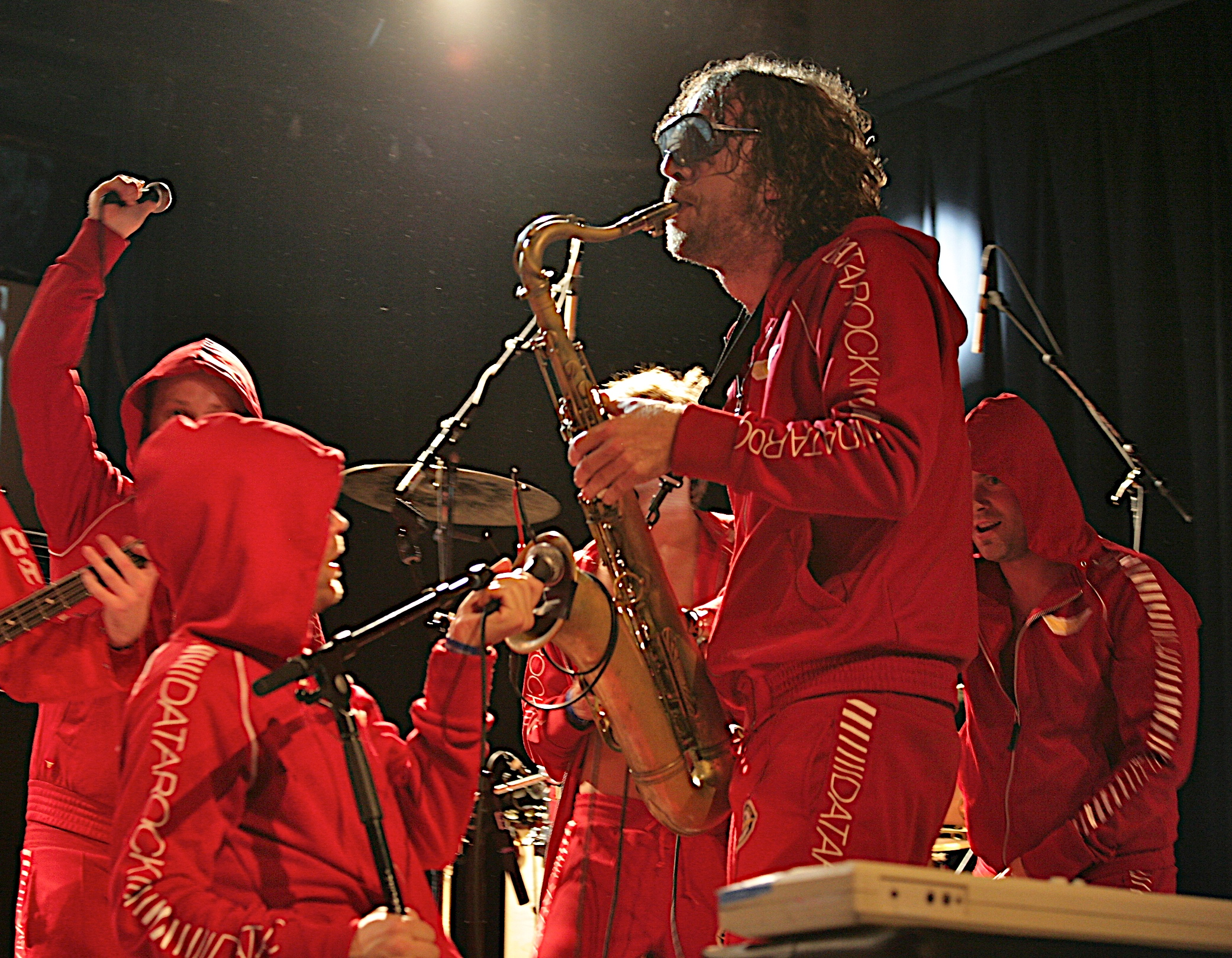

Background information
- Born: Kjetil Traavik Møster; 17 June 1976 (age 49); Bergen, Hordaland, Norway
- Genres: Jazz
- Occupations: Musician, composer
- Instruments: Saxophone, clarinet, vocals
- Website: www.moester.no

Kjetil Traavik Møster (born 17 June 1976) is a Norwegian jazz musician (tenor and soprano saxophones, clarinet and bass clarinet) and composer, known from bands like The Core, Ultralyd, Brat, Zanussi 5, and performance with Chick Corea at Moldejazz 2000, later released on CD. He has also made his mark with experimental performances at the interface between electronic based fri-rock and jazz.

== Career ==
Møster was born in Bergen and has played the accordion since he was six years old; he learned the cornet, bass and saxophone in subsequent years, and played the guitar in the rock band "Riper i lakken" since 13. From 1995 to 1996, Møster studied at Sund folkehøgskole where he wrote a song called "Eg veit ka du gjorde med Åshild" ("I know what you did with Åshild") for the album made by the current class of Sund. He later attended the Jazz program at Trondheim Musikkonservatorium (1998–2001), where he established the trio "Möster", with Steinar Raknes and Tor Haugerud. He later joined the bassist Per Zanussi with "Zanussi 5".

Møster also participated in Espen Aalberg's "The Core" on several occasions and records, as well as the bands "Gibrish" and "Brat" .

Møster performed at the Kongsberg Jazz Festival 2005 (solo), with Trondheim Jazz Orchestra on US tour in 2006, where he was awarded This year's Jazz talent. Performance on Nattjazz 2006 was awarded Nattjazz prisen. He leads his own band, K. M. Sextet, performing at the North Sea Jazz Festival and the Moldejazz 2006. The Sextet consists of members from the band MZN3 with Møster, Zanussi and Kjell Nordeson (drums), in addition to the trio Morten J. Olsen (drums), Ingebrigt Håker Flaten (bass) and Anders Hana (guitar).

Together with Maja S.K. Ratkje, Paal Nilssen-Love and Lasse Marhaug, he started the festival "All Ears" in 2002. He is also a member of the Norwegian electronic rock band Datarock, where he plays saxophone, percussion, keyboards and does some vocals.

In the summer 2014, Møster visited festivals and toured with artists like Röyksopp/Robyn, Lars Vaular, Datarock and Bushman's Revenge, and as bandleader and saxophonist released the album Inner Earth, album number two with the band Møster!. This time he is joined by guitarist and vocalist of Motorpsycho, Hans Magnus Ryan aka Snah, bassist of Elephant9 and Bigbang, bass player Nikolai Hængsle of BigBang and The National Bank; and the ubiquitous drummer of Motorpsycho and Grand General, Kenneth Kapstad.

== Honors ==
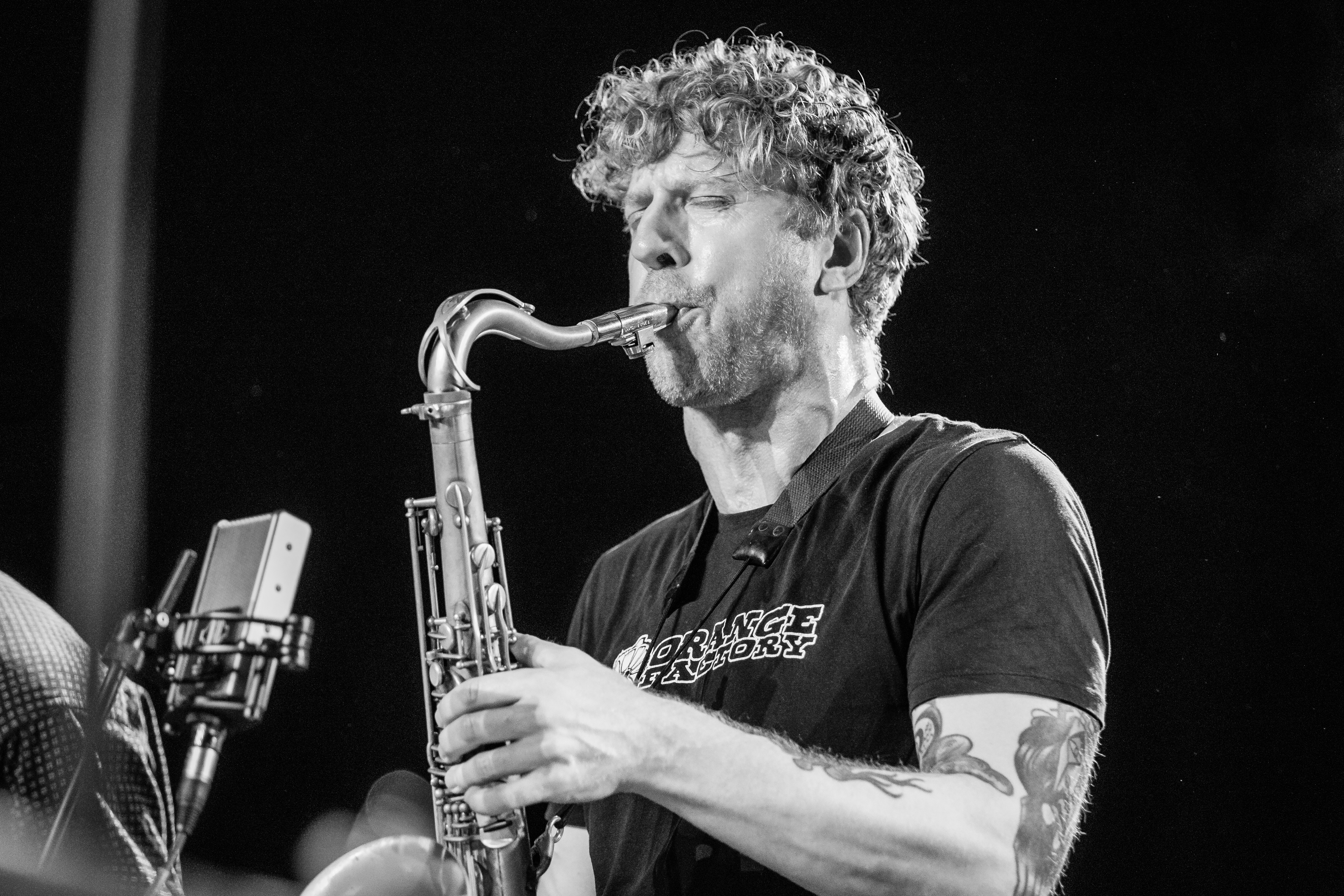
Kjetil Møster performing at Energimølla, Kongsberg 2024 Photo: Tore Sætre

- 2003: Exxon Prize at Moldejazz, with The Core
- 2005: This year's international jazz talent, in New York
- 2006: Nattjazzprisen
- 2009: Vossajazzprisen

== Discography ==
=== Solo albums ===
- 2011: Blow Job (+3 dB)
- 2014: JÜ Meets Møster (RareNoise)

With Møster!

- 2004: Edvard Lygre Møster (Hubro)
- 2014: Inner Earth (Hubro)
- 2015: When You Cut into the Present (Hubro)
- 2018: States of Minds (Hubro)
- 2020: Dust Breathing (Hubro)

=== Collaborations ===
With Zanussi 5

- 2004: Zanussi 5 (Moserobie)
- 2006: Alborado (Moserobie)
- 2010: Ghost Dance (Moserobie)
- 2014: Live in Coimbra (Clean Feed)

With The Core

- 2004: Vison (Jazzaway)
- 2005: Blue Sky (Jazzaway)
- 2006: The Indian Core (Grappa), with Indian musicians
- 2007: Office Essentials (Jazzland)
- 2007: Meditations on Coltrane (Grappa), with Bergen Big Band
- 2008: Golonka Love (Moserobie ), live recordings from Poland
- 2010: Party (Moserobie Music), recordings from "Nasjonal Jazzscene" in Oslo

With Brat

- 2004: Please Don't Shoot (Moserobie)

With Eirik Hegdal and Trondheim Jazz Orchestra

- 2004: We Are? (2004)

With Trinity

- 2004: Parkling (2004)
- 2009: Breaking the Mold (2009)

With the Crimetime Orchestra

- 2004: Life Is a Beautiful Monster (Jazzaway)
- 2009: Atomic Symphony (Jazzaway)

With MZN3, a trio consisting of Per Zanussi (bass) and Kjell Nordeson (percussion)

- 2005: MZN3 (2005)

With Guro Skumsnes Moe

- 2011: It Pictures (Conrad Sound)

Awards
Preceded by Tord Gustavsen	Recipient of the Nattjazzprisen; 2006	Succeeded by Helge Lien
Preceded by Mads Berven	Recipient of the Vossajazzprisen; 2009	Succeeded by Stein Urheim
