= John Hegre =

- Born: 1 February 1967 (age 58); Bergen, Hordaland
- Origin: Norway
- Genres: Noise music, electronica, jazz
- Occupation(s): Musician, composer, sound engineering, music producer
- Instrument: Guitar

John Hegre (born 1 February 1967 in Bergen, Norway) is a Norwegian guitarist, songwriter and sound engineer. He has collaborated in bands like Der Brief and Public Enema, together with drummer Nils Are Drønen since 1995. He is part of Kaptein Kaliber.

== Career ==
Hegre is one of the cornerstones of Norwegian noise music. He completed the sound engineer education at Norwegian lydskole in Oslo (1991) and subsisted for several years as a sound engineer until he decided to make his own music as his main focus at the end of the 1990s.

Hegre started Jazzkammer together with Lasse Marhaug in 1998, and Kaptein Kaliber with David Aasheim in 1999. He is also involved in Golden Serenades with Jørgen Træen, Black Packers with Jean-Philippe Gross, Rehab with Bjørnar Habbestad, Tree People with Morten J. Olsen and Ignaz Schick, NOXAGT with Kjetil Brandsdal and Jan Christian L. Kyvik, Bergen Impro Storband, Skurkeklubben with David Aasheim, Jørgen Træen and Bjørn Torske, Tralten Eller Utpult with Thore Warland and Kristoffer Riis.

== Discography ==
Solo albums

- 2003: A Nice Place To Leave (Dekorder)
- 2005: Snow King (Rape Art)
- 2006: Colors don´t clash (Dekorder)

As John Hegre/Lasse Marhaug/Helge Sten

- 1999: The Comfort of Objects (Ohm Records)

As John Hegre/Lasse Marhaug

- 2002: Acoustic (Authorised Version)

As John Hegre/Lasse Marhaug/Y Yoshida

- 2002: Saturday Night Groove Sessions (Xerxes)

As John Hegre/Maja Ratkje

- 2005: Ballads (Dekorder)

As John Hegre/Howard Stelzer

- 2007: The Boring Leading The Bored (humbug)

As John Hegre/Lene Grenager/Harald Fetveit/Else Olsen S

- 2009: Ute (AIM)

As John Hegre & Marcelo Aguirre & Die Polizei

- 2009: Live at Adolf 666 (soopa records)

As Irabagon, Hegre & Drønen

- 2017: Axis (Rune Grammofon)
