= Morten Qvenild discography =

Morten Qvenild discography

== Solo albums ==
- 2015: Personal Piano (Hubro Music)
- 2016: The HyPer(Sonal) Piano Project - Towards A (Per)Sonal Topography Of Grand Piano And Electronics (Hubro Music)
- 2019: Landet Bortanfor Landet - Område 51 (Grappa Musikkforlag, GRLP4651)

== Collaborations ==
In The Country

- 2005: This Was the Pace of My Heartbeat (Rune Grammofon)
- 2006: Losing Stones, Collecting Bones (Rune Grammofon)
- 2009: Whiteout (Rune Grammofon)
- 2011: Sounds and Sights (Live album with DVD, Rune Grammofon)
- 2013: Sunset Sunrise (ACT)

Østenfor Sol

- 1998: Syng, Dovre (Major Studio)
- 2001: Troillspel (Major Studio)

Shining

- 2001: Where the Ragged People Go (Blå Productions)
- 2003: Sweet Shanghai Devil (Jazzland Recordings)
- 2005: In the Kingdom of Kitsch You Will Be a Monster (Rune Grammofon)

Solveig Slettahjell Slow Motion Orchestra

- 2001: Slow Motion Orchestra (Curling Legs)
- 2004: Silver (Curling Legs)
- 2005: Pixiedust (Curling Legs)
- 2006: Good Rain (Curling Legs)
- 2009: Tarpan Seasons (Universal)

Jaga Jazzist

- 2001: A Livingroom Hush (Press Play, Ninja Tune, 2002)
- 2002: The Stix (WEA, Ninja Tune)
- 2004: Day (EP, Ninja Tune)

The National Bank

- 2004: The National Bank
- 2008: Come On over to the Other Side

Trinity

- 2004: Sparkling (Jazzaway Records)
- 2009: Breaking The Mold (Clean Feed)

Susanna & the Magical Orchestra (Susanna Wallumrød)

- 2004: List of Lights and Buoys (Rune Grammofon)
- 2006: Melody Mountain (Rune Grammofon)
- 2009: 3 (Rune Grammofon)

Susanne Sundfør

- 2007: Susanne Sundfør (Your Favourite Music), on two tracks
- 2010: The Brothel (EMI Norway), as producer
- 2011: A Night at Salle Pleyel (EMI Norway)

Magic Pocket

- 2011: The Katabatic Wind (Bolage)

Duo live with Solveig Slettahjell

- 2012: Antologie (Universal)

sPacemoNkey duo with Gard Nilssen

- 2014: The Karman Line (Hubro Music)

Finland including with Ivar Grydeland, Jo Berger Myhre, Pål Hausken

- 2015: Rainy Omen (Hubro Music)

== As a guest musician ==
- 2000: Ra - Live @ blaa
- 2001: OJ Trio - Breaks Even
- 2004: Jan Martin Smørdal's Acoustic Accident - Q. S.
- 2005: Nils Petter Molvær - Remakes (Sula Records)
- 2006: Christer Knutsen - Grand Hotel
- 2006: Thomas Dybdahl - Science
- 2007: Susanna Wallumrød - Sonata Mix Dwarf Cosmos
- 2011: Mathias Eick - Skala (ECM)
