= Red Kite (band) =

Norwegian prog-jazz band

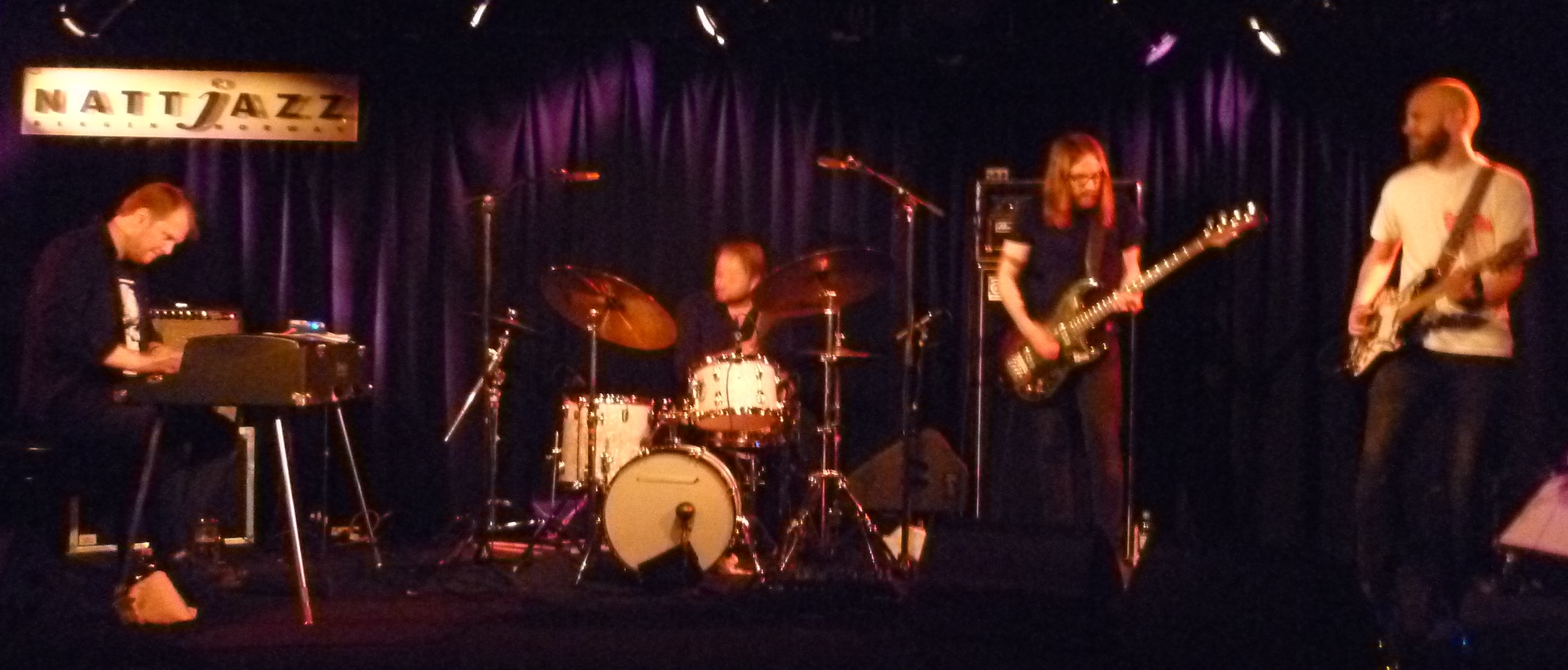
- Red Kite live at the 2016 Nattjazz.

Background information
- Origin: Oslo, Norway
- Genres: Prog-rock, jazz-rock
- Years active: 2014–present
- Members: Bernt Moen; Even Helte Hermansen; Trond Frønes; Torstein Lofthus

Red Kite (formed in 2014 in Oslo, Norway) is a Norwegian prog-jazz band.

== Biography ==
Red Kite is a band composed of Norwegian jazz, prog, impro and rock musicians. The members come from the bands Shining, Elephant9, Bushman's Revenge and Grand General. The band's sound blends psychedelic 1970s rock and experimental jazz. The band played at Vossajazz and at Nattjazz in 2016.

== Band members ==
- Bernt Moen - keyboards
- Even Helte Hermansen - guitar
- Trond Frønes - bass
- Torstein Lofthus - drums
