= Even Helte Hermansen =

Norwegian guitarist (born 1982)

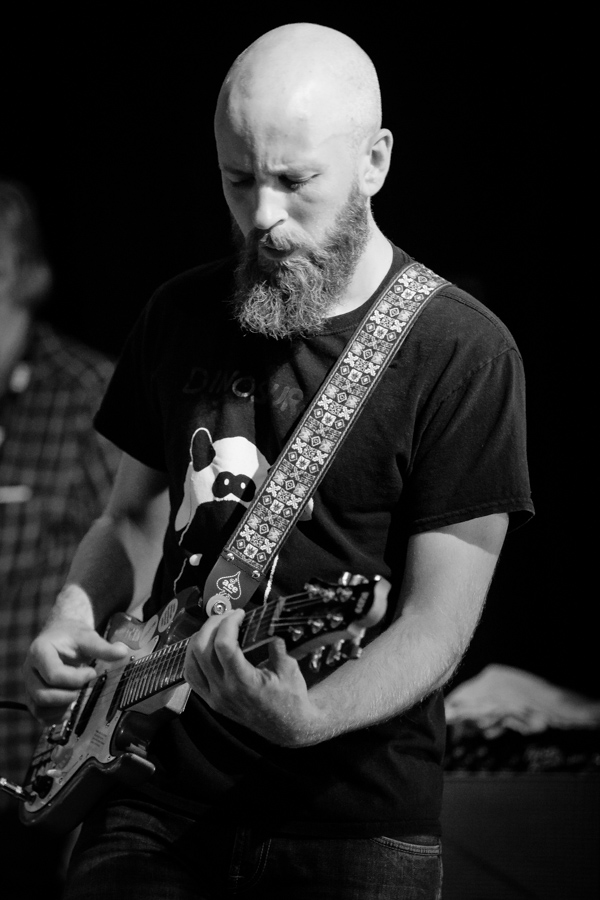
- Even Helte Hermansen at the 2018 Kongsberg Jazzfestival

Background information
- Born: 13 February 1982 (age 44); Skien, Telemark
- Origin: Norway
- Genres: Jazz
- Occupations: Musician, composer
- Instrument: Guitar
- Label: Rune Grammofon
- Website: www.guitarmoderne.com/artists/spotlight-even-helte-hermansen

Even Helte Hermansen (born 13 February 1982 in Skien, Norway) is a Norwegian guitarist, known from several orchestras playing experimental jazz.

== Career ==
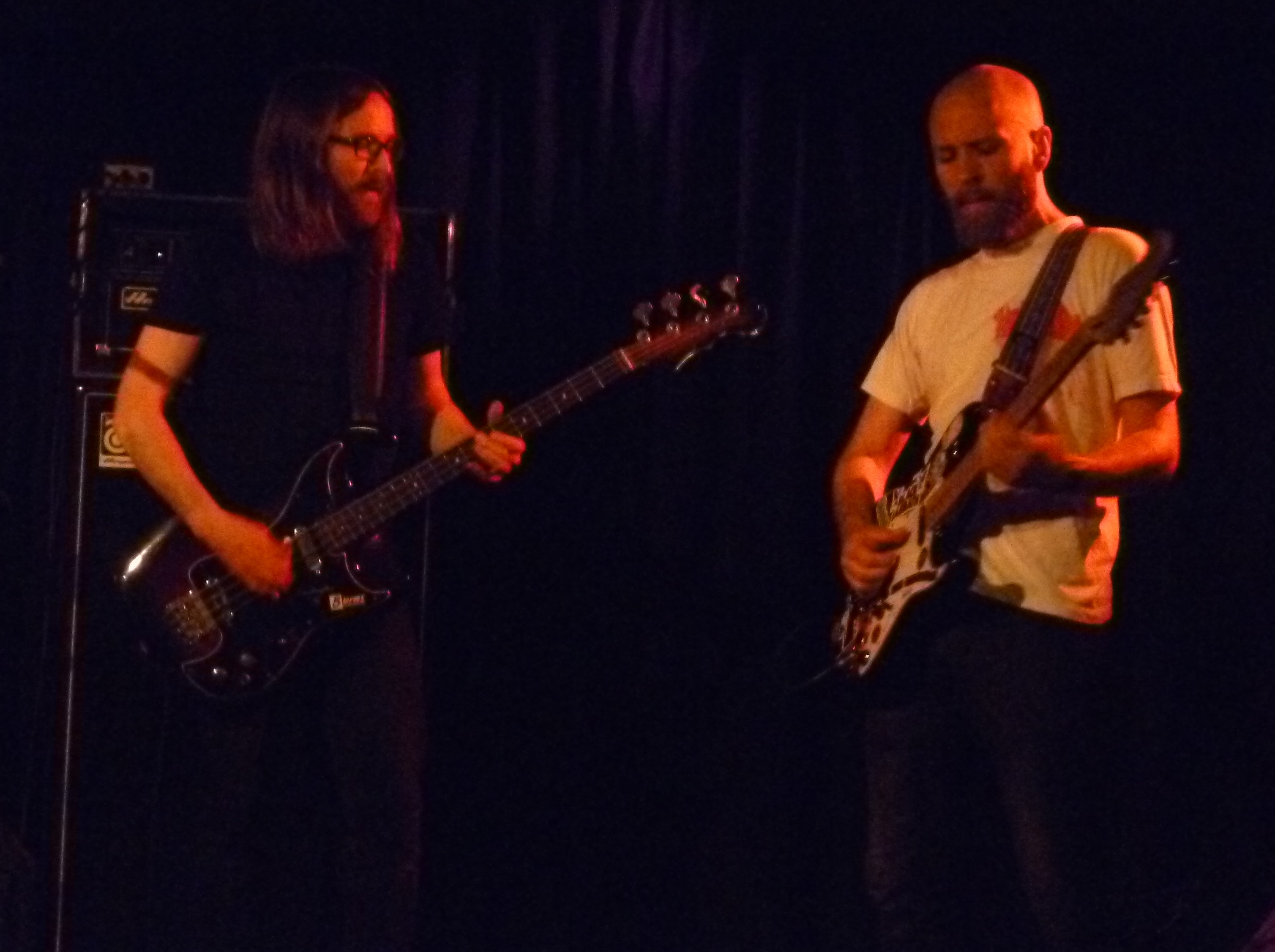
Hermansen and Trond Frønes with Red Kite at the 2016 Nattjazz.

Hermansen has a background in heavy metal and rock, and studied music at Norges Musikkhøgskole. He participated in a series of bands, including Bushman's Revenge, Lamaskrik and Shining. In 2006 he appears at Kongsberg Jazzfestival and the competition Jazzintro, within the quartet Supersonic Rocketship, including Jørgen Mathisen (saxophone), Ola Høyer (bass) and Dag Erik Knedal Andersen (drums). He collaborated within Shining from 2007 to 2010. The first release in 2007, along with Jørgen Munkeby (multi instrumentalist), Andreas Ulvo (piano), Torstein Lofthus (drums) and Morten Strøm. It was even more album releases Rune Grammofon. Since 2003, he has also played in trio Bushman's revenge together with Gard Nilssen (drums) and Rune Nergaard (bass), Also this band released several albums on Rune Grammofon from 2007. He has also contributed with the orchestra "Navyelectre" and their releases. When Eple Trio released their album The Widening Sphere of Influence in 2008, he contributed on "Eclipse", a composition by Andreas Ulvo. When Solveig Slettahjell released the album Tarpan Seasons in 2009 he was involved in her "Slow Motion Orchestra" together with Morten Qvenild (piano), Andreas Ulvo (organ), Sjur Miljeteig (trumpet), Jo Berger Myhre (bass) and Per Oddvar Johansen (drums). He was also the septet that played the commissioned work by Mathias Eick to Vossajazz 2011.

== Honors ==
- 2007: Young Nordic Jazz Comets, best soloist

== Discography ==
Within Bushman's Revenge

- 2007: Cowboy Music (Jazzaway Records)
- 2009: You Lost Me at Hello (Rune Grammofon)
- 2010: Jitterbug (Rune Grammofon)
- 2012: A Little Bit of Big Bonanza (Rune Grammofon)
- 2012: Never Mind The Botox (Rune Grammofon)
- 2013: Electric Komle – Live! (Rune Grammofon)
- 2016: Jazz, Fritt Etter Hukommelsen (Rune Grammofon)
- 2016: Bushman's Fire (Rune Grammofon), live LP with Kjetil Møster and David Wallumrød
- 2019: Et hån mot overklassen (Hubro Music)

With Heidi Skjerve

- 2008: Morning News of the Woods (Curling Legs)

With Solveig Slettahjell & The Slow Motion Orchestra

- 2009: Tarpan Seasons (EmArcy)

Within Shining

- 2010: Blackjazz (Indie Recordings)

With Jan Toft

- 2010: "Alle E Aleina" (Warner)

Within Eple Trio

- 2010: The Widening Sphere of Influence (NorCD)

Within Grand General

- 2010: ''Grand General (Rune Grammofon)

Within ELEkTRO

- 2014: ELEkTRO feat Rudi Mahall & Even Hermansen (Blackout Music)
