= Sjur Miljeteig =

Norwegian jazz trumpeter, composer and author

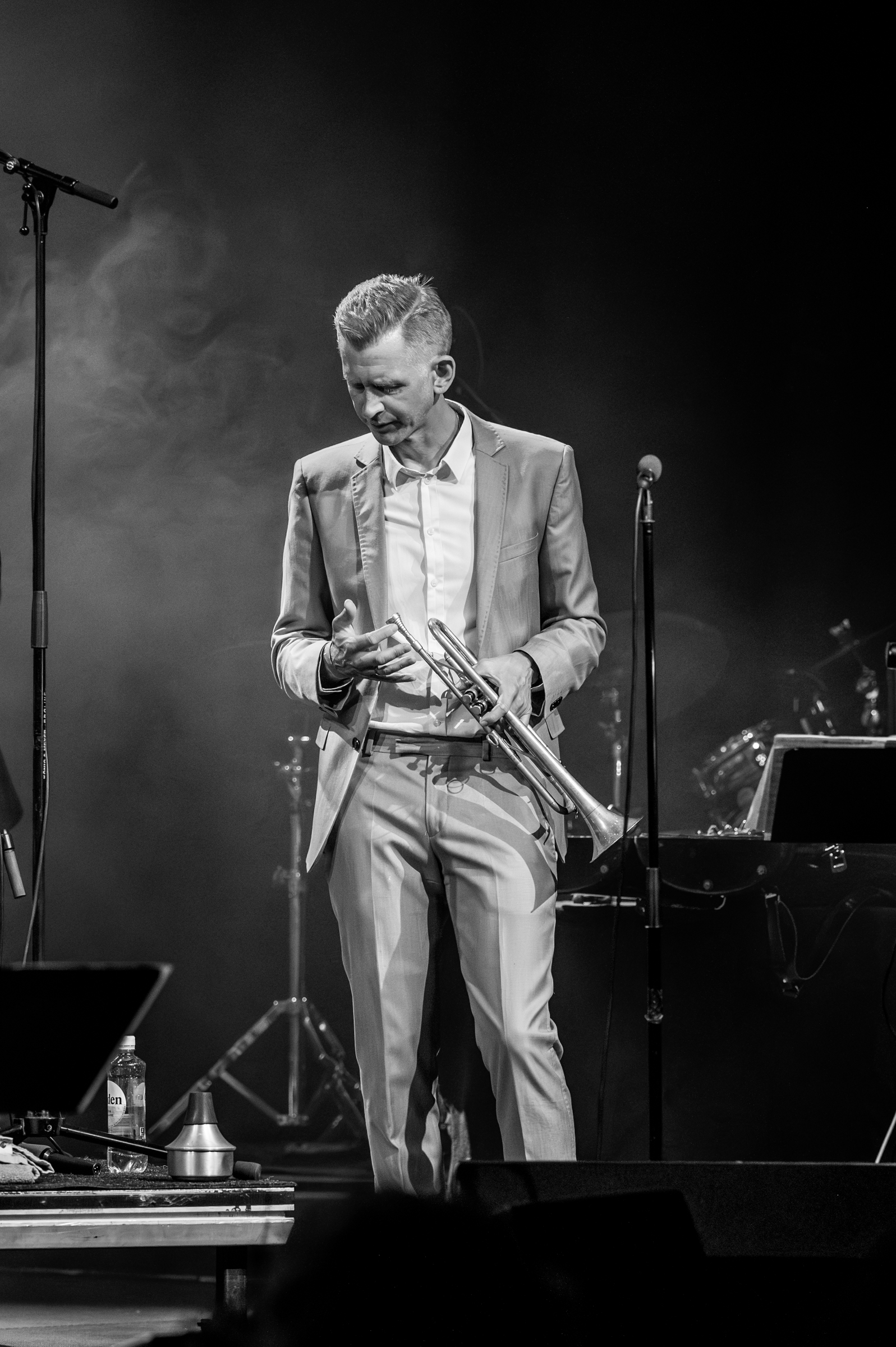

Background information
- Born: 4 January 1974 (age 51)
- Origin: Norway
- Genres: Jazz
- Occupations: Musician, composer, music producer
- Instrument: Trumpet
- Labels: ECM
- Formerly of: Friko; Sjur Miljeteig Band
- Website: www.sjurmiljeteig.com

Sjur Miljeteig (born 4 January 1974) is a Norwegian jazz musician (trumpet), composer and author, married 20 October 2007 to the actress Ane Dahl Torp (1975), and they live in Oslo with their two children, a boy (2010) and a girl (2012). He is known for his performances of the music of Miles Davis in a band including Håvard Wiik, Ingebrigt Håker Flaten and Peder Kjellsby.

== Career ==
Miljeteig attended the music program at Foss videregående skole (1990) earning his Examen artium in 1993. He has evolved to be one of the finest Norwegian trumpeters, and has been in the line-up on more than 50 Norwegian record releases.

He released the album Fra Mirakelarkivet (1997) with cooperate lyricist Markus Midré, and has operated steadily in tandem with drummer and handyman Peder Kjellsby. Within the duo Friko, they released two albums Burglar ballads (2003) and Journey to Mandoola (2006), performed on the Oslo Jazzfestival 2004 and 2006 respectively. Burglar ballads was placed on list of the best Norwegian releases by the Norwegian magazine Morgenbladet. Later, he became known for his collaborations with Jaga Jazzist, as part of the recording crew on the first album Jævla Jazzist Grete Stitz (1996) and on the EP Magazine (1998). He also was in their line up for a short period in 1997. In the band "For Sure" he collaborated with Aslak Hartberg, and in various formations of the "Slow Motion Orchestra" with Solveig Slettahjell, as well as on her album Natt I Bethlehem (2008) including Tord Gustavsen and the album Tarpan Seasons (2009), where the "Slow Motion Orchestra" included Morten Qvenild (piano), Andreas Ulvo (organ), Even Helte Hermansen (guitar), Jo Berger Myhre (bass) and Per Oddvar Johansen (drums).

Miljeteig has also collaborated on the album In the Kingdom of Kitsch You Will Be a Monster with the band Shining, a Jaga Jazzist offshoot with two former members and writers Jørgen Munkeby and Morten Qvenild in their ranks, with Folk & Røvere and with Crimetime Orchestra on the album Life is a beautiful monster (2004). Miljeteig released his debut solo album It's Funny How Things Happen at Particular Times in 2013, and here he stands out as a very original in a somewhat surreal, beautiful and catchy electro acoustic landscape. The album was well received in the Norwegian press. The guitarist Olav Torget contributes on several tunes, including the beautiful rocking afro groove on the title track. Miljeteig has on several occasions performed music to different texts together with his wife Ane Dahl Torp, like Arne Garborg and Biblical texts.

== Discography (in selection) ==
=== Solo albums ===
- 2013: It's Funny How Things Happen at Particular Times (Trust Me), including Øystein Skar, Marte Eberson, Olav Torget and Per Oddvar Johansen

=== As co-leader ===
Within Friko

- 2003: Burglar Ballads (C+C Records)
- 2006: Journey To Mandoola (C+C Records)

=== Collaborations ===
With Bugge Wesseltoft

- 1996: New Conception of Jazz (Jazzland Recordings)

With Markus Midré

1997:Fra Mirakelarkivet (Tiden)

With Bugge Wesseltoft

- 1998: New Conception of Jazz (Jazzland Recordings)

Anneli Drecker

- 2000 Tundra (EMI Records)

Within Crimetime Orchestra

- 2004: Life is a beautiful monster (Trust Me)

Within Shining

- 2005: In the Kingdom of Kitsch You Will Be a Monster (Rune Grammofon)

With Solveig Slettahjell

- 2008: Natt I Bethlehem (EmArcy), with Tord Gustavsen
- 2009: Tarpan Seasons (EmArcy)
