= Blackjazz =

Studio album by Shining
- Released: 18 January 2010
- Genres: Avant-garde metal, extreme metal, alternative metal, industrial metal, progressive metal
- Length: 57:15
- Label: Indie Recordings
- Producer: Jørgen Munkeby

Shining chronology
Grindstone (2007)	Blackjazz (2010)	Live Blackjazz (2011)

Blackjazz is the fifth studio album by the Norwegian band Shining, released through Indie Recordings on 18 January 2010. It marks a shift into the avant-garde metal genre, with extreme metal, industrial and progressive influences.

== Production ==
=== Songwriting ===
As on Shining's two previous albums, the music draws elements from many different genres. The album's title, Blackjazz, is meant to describe the band's sound.

The instrumentation is far simpler than on the two previous albums, with Jørgen Munkeby focusing on guitars and saxophone. This has made the album's sound closer to how they sound live, as songs from previous albums needed to be simplified for live performances.

According to Munkeby, a big inspiration in the development of the Blackjazz genre, was his work with In Lingua Mortua in 2006/2007. To quote Munkeby: "Lars' refreshing blend of an impressive intellectual display and direct raw power has been a big inspiration for me. Lars is a true pioneer. He was the first person to invite me to play sax in a black metal setting, and in so doing, contributed strongly to SHINING's later development of the Blackjazz genre."

Another big influence on Blackjazz is Shining's collaboration with Enslaved, with whom they composed and performed a 90-minute ″Armageddon Concerto″, Nine Nights in Nothingness – Glimpses of Downfall, at Moldejazz 2008. In fact, the concerto's second movement is an early version of Blackjazz Deathtrance, the seventh movement is an early version of the song "Fisheye", and a studio version of the first movement, "RMGDN", is a bonus track on the vinyl edition of Blackjazz. The concerto was commissioned by Moldejazz after the programme committee saw a video of the two bands performing a cover of King Crimson's "21st Century Schizoid Man" on their 2007 tour. A new version of the same song forms the final track on Blackjazz, featuring guest vocals by Enslaved's Grutle Kjellson.

The song "Fisheye" features the repeated mention of "1-3-7-5"; Munkeby explained that his inspiration for the song was kabbalah and gematria.

=== Promotion ===
Shining performed the world premiere of the song "Fisheye" live on Store Studio, a culture talk show on NRK, 10 October 2009. Their performance was later released on YouTube, and as a free mp3 download from NRK.

An extended version of "Fisheye" and the single "The Madness and the Damage Done" were released on iTunes prior to Blackjazz release. The Singles were well-received, with "Fisheye" named Best song of 2009 by a critic in NRK's Lydverket, and giving Shining a place on Time Out New York's list the Stars of 2010.

== Reception ==
Professional ratings
Aggregate scores
Source	Rating
Metacritic	83/100
Review scores
Source	Rating
AllMusic	4.5/5 stars
Alternative Press	4.5/5 stars
Cokemachineglow	71%
Drowned in Sound	7/10
Fact	4.5/5 stars
Pitchfork	7.7/10
PopMatters	8/10
Rock Sound	7/10
Tiny Mix Tapes	4/5 stars
Tom Hull	B+

The album was well received by critics. Notably, it was one of the few new releases ever to get a perfect five-star rating in its initial review by Allmusic, although its rating was later downgraded to four and a half stars.

== Track listing ==
All tracks written by Jørgen Munkeby except "21st Century Schizoid Man" written by Greg Lake, Ian McDonald, Michael Giles, Peter Sinfield and Robert Fripp.

No.	Title	Length
1.	"The Madness and the Damage Done"	5:20
2.	"Fisheye"	5:07
3.	"Exit Sun"	8:35
4.	"Exit Sun"	0:57
5.	"Healter Skelter"	5:34
6.	"The Madness and the Damage Done"	3:23
7.	"Blackjazz Deathtrance"	10:50
8.	"Omen"	8:45
9.	"21st Century Schizoid Man" (King Crimson cover)	8:40
Total length:		57:15

Vinyl Version Bonus Tracks
No.	Title	Length
10.	"Fisheye" (Extended Version)	6:59
11.	"RMGDN"	12:37
Total length:		01:16:51

== Personnel ==
Shining

- Jørgen Munkeby – vocals, guitars, saxophone
- Even Helte Hermansen – guitars
- Tor Egil Kreken – bass
- Bernt Moen – synthesizers, keyboards
- Torstein Lofthus – drums

Additional musicians

- Grutle Kjellson – guest vocals on "Omen" and "21st Century Schizoid Man"

Production

- Jørgen Munkeby – producer
- Sean Beavan – mixing
- Tom Baker – mastering

== Charts ==
Chart (2010)	Peak position
Norwegian Albums Chart	9

== Release history ==
Region	Date	Label	Format	Catalog
Norway	18 January 2010	Indie Recordings	CD	INDIE 045 CD
Norway	18 January 2010	Indie Recordings	double LP	INDIE 045 LP
Europe	25 January 2010	Indie Recordings	CD	
United States	2 February 2010	The End Records	CD	
