= Aslak Hartberg =

Norwegian rapper and bass player

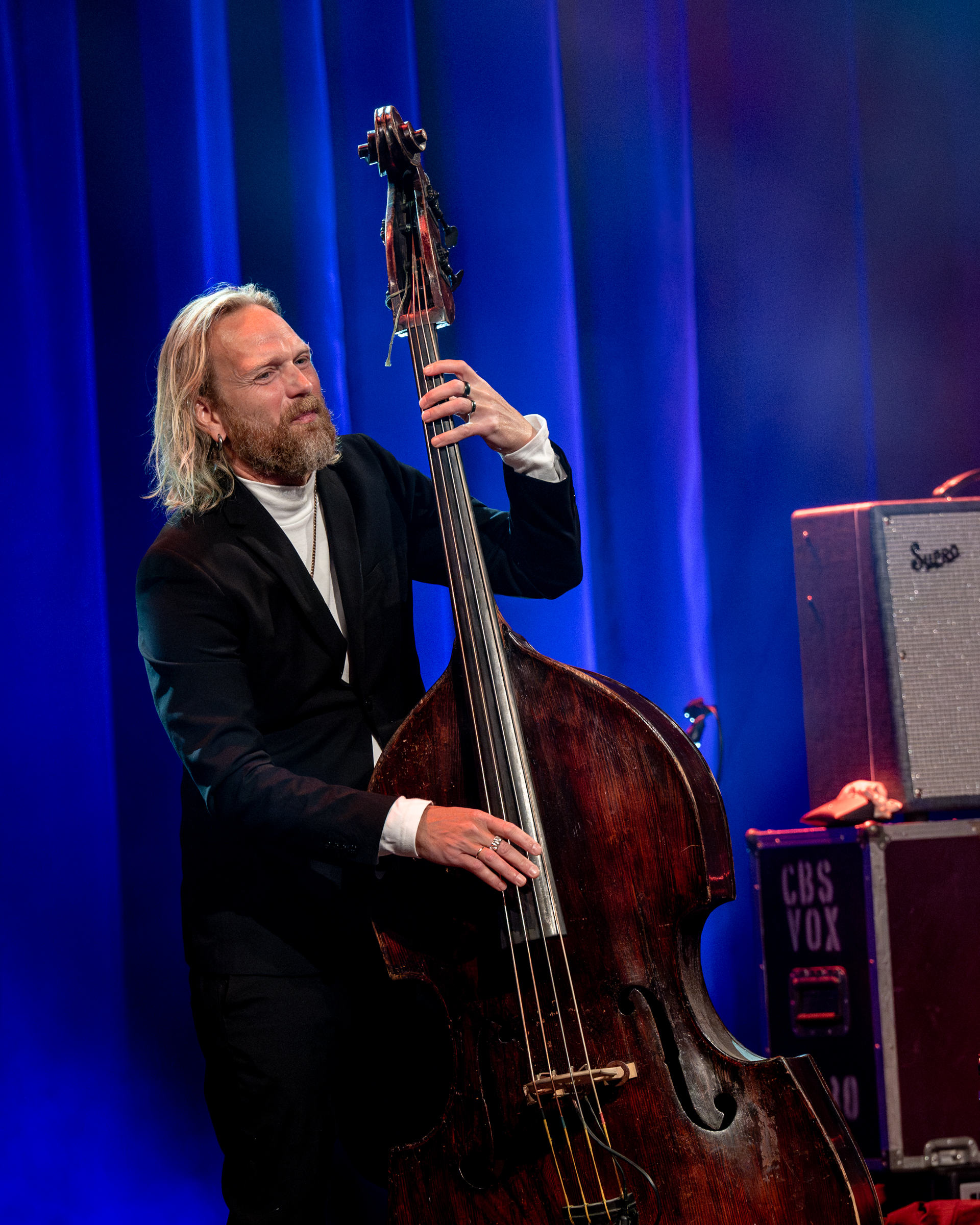

Background information
- Also known as: Alis
- Born: Aslak Rakli Hartberg; 1 May 1975 (age 51)
- Origin: Oslo, Norway
- Genre: Jazz
- Occupations: Upright bassist, rapper
- Instrument: Double bass
- Labels: Virgin, Rune Grammofon, Jazzland, City Connections

Aslak Rakli Hartberg alias Alis (born 1 May 1975 in Oslo, Norway), is a Norwegian rapper and bass player, and was the leading figure in the Norwegian hip hop band Klovner i Kamp. He is the brother of cartoonist Flu Hartberg.

== Education ==
Hartberg attended Foss Upper Secondary School (1991–94), on the Music program together with the artists Bertine Zetlitz, Jannike Kruse, Kate Havnevik and the author Markus Midrè. He studied music at Norwegian Academy of Music 1995-99.

== Career ==
Hartberg was noticed as early as 15–16 years old as a bass player on the jazz scene connected to «Oslo jazzhus» in Toftesgate. Here he played in several bands, including «For Sure» with Sjur Miljeteig, and «Gest» with Tord Gustavsen.

He established «Klovner i Kamp» in 1994 together with Sveinung Eide. The same year he was part of establishing the band «Oslo Fluid». In sum, these bands let out seven albums, in addition to a plethora of singles and EP's. In 1995, he was also involved in «Pimp image», Norwegian pop band inspired by acid-jazz wave, which was signed to Virgin Records. In 1999 he was part of starting the label «City Connections» which was an important contributor to the Norwegian hip-hop community. Besides «Klovner i Kamp» and «Oslo Fluid», they released records with «Salvador», «Malay Sparks» and «Mojo and He-man». In this period Hartberg also had success as a jazz musician. At 20y he replaced bassist Bjørn Kjellemyr in Halle/Eberson Quartet and at the end of the 1990s he started the band Shining together with Jørgen Munkeby, Morten Qvenild and Torstein Lofthus, fellow students at Norges Musikkhøgskole. Gruppen utga tre plater og turnerte i hele verden før Hartberg sluttet i 2005.

He also was awarded «Alarmprisen» twice with the band Shining.

Hartberg and Esben Selvig was in 2002 awarded Edvard Prize in the class Text to music, within the band Klovner i Kamp tune «Nattens sønner». The group's lyrics can be found in half a dozen Norwegian text books, poetry collections and anthologies. In 2006 the band «Klovner i Kamp» broke up.

In 2005 he composed music for the TV series «Gutta Boys» for NRK nominated for the American Emmy. The following year, he composed all the music for the Norwegian participant for the Oscar Award Tatt av kvinnen. He composed the music for the Danish TV series Pagten for DR1 in 2009, and music for the film Keepern til Liverpool in 2010. He was the musical director for Lars Saabye Christensen play Chet spiler ikke her with Torbjørn Harr on «Torshovteateret» in 2009/2010. He composed the score for the film I et speil, i en gåte featuring Liv Ullmann.

Hartberg plays in the rock band «Yoga Fire» together with Jonas Forsang Moksnes, Esben Selvig, Sveinung Eide and Søren Brandt. He has also contributed to albums by Paperboys, «Apollo», «URO» and Lars Beckstrøm among others, and has written the book Fuck you eller penga tilbake published on «Tiden forlag» 2009.

== Honors ==
- Spellemannprisen 2001, with «Klovner i Kamp».
- Edvard Prize 2002 in the class Text to music, within the band «Klovner i Kamp»
- «Alarmprisen» 2006 for the album In The Kingdom Of Kitsch You Will Be A Monster, within the band Shining
- «Alarmprisen» 2007 for the album Grindstone, within the band Shining

== Discography ==
With « Oslo Fluid»

- 1997: Dynamite (C+C records)
- 1998: Waffelman EP (C+C Records)
- 2000: Cycles of Life (City Connections)

With «Klovner i Kamp»

- 2000: Schwin (City Connections)
- 2001: Bjølsen hospital (City Connections)
- 2003: Kunsten å fortelle (City Connection)
- 2005: Ørnen tek ikkje unga (Tuba record)

With Shining

- 2001: Where the Ragged People Go (BP Records)
- 2003: Sweet Shanghai Devil (Jazzland)
- 2005: In the Kingdom of Kitsch You Will Be a Monster (Rune Grammofon)
- 2008: Shining (Rune Grammofon)

With other projects

- 1996: Whisper 2000 (Virgin Records), with «Pimp Image»
- 2001: Where is the Chet (K&K Jazz Series), Jazz standards within Torbjørn Sunde Oktett, in Germany 2002
- 2001: The O O Quartet (Curling Legs), within Jon Eberson 00 Quartet
- 2006: Matzukaze, with Håkon Storm Mathisen
- 2004: QS (AIM ), within Jan Martin Smørdal's «Acoustic Accident»
- 2009: Fuck you eller penga tilbake (MTG), within «Yoga Fire»
- 2012: Who's Gonna Let You Down? (Trust Me Records), within «Töckfors»
