= One One One =

Studio album by Shining
- Released: April 8, 2013
- Genre: Avant-garde metal, extreme metal, alternative metal, industrial metal, progressive metal
- Length: 35:49
- Label: Universal/Indie Recordings
- Producer: Jørgen Munkeby

Shining chronology
Live Blackjazz (2011)	One One One (2013)	International Blackjazz Society (2015)

One One One is the sixth studio album by the Norwegian band Shining, released through Universal on April 8, 2013, and Indie Recordings on June 7, 2013.

== Overview ==
The Norwegian band Shining started out as an acoustic jazz quartet, but the sound of this new album, like its predecessor, Blackjazz, is more experimental and extreme than the band's first releases. It incorporates elements from black metal, progressive rock, and 19th and 20th Century classical music with the foundations of jazz music.

== Reception ==
Professional ratings
Review scores
Source	Rating
AllMusic	4/5 stars
Heavy Blog is Heavy	4.5/5 stars
Dagbladet	5/6 stars
PopMatters	8/10 stars

The album was well received by critics, with Heavy Blog Is Heavy awarding the album 4.5 out of 5 stars, and the Norwegian newspaper Dagbladet rating the album a 5 out of 6.

== Track listing ==
=== CD version ===
1. "I Won't Forget" (3:51)
2. "The One Inside" (4:04)
3. "My Dying Drive" (4:06)
4. "Off the Hook" (3:37)
5. "Blackjazz Rebels" (3:38)
6. "How Your Story Ends" (4:39)
7. "The Hurting Game" (4:09)
8. "Walk Away" (3:38)
9. "Paint the Sky Black" (4:19)

=== LP version ===
Side A

1. "I Won't Forget" (3:51)
2. "The One Inside" (4:04)
3. "My Dying Drive" (4:06)
4. "Off the Hook" (3:37)

Side B

1. "Blackjazz Rebels" (3:38)
2. "How Your Story Ends" (4:39)
3. "The Hurting Game" (4:09)
4. "Walk Away" (3:38)
5. "Paint the Sky Black" (4:19)

== Personnel ==
- Jørgen Munkeby – Vocals, guitars, saxophone
- Torstein Lofthus – Drums
- Tor Egil Kreken – Bass
- Håkon Sagen – Guitar

== Credits ==
- Co-producer and mixing – Sean Beavan
- Design – Trine + Kim Design Studio
- Mastering – Tom Baker
- Producer, composer, recording – Jørgen Munkeby
- Recorded by Mike Hartung

== Notes ==
- Partly funded by A-ha, Norsk Kulturråd, Fond for utøvende kunstnere, Fond for lyd og bilde and Tekstforfatterfondet.
