= Klovner I Kamp =

Norwegian hip hop group

- Origin: Tåsen, Oslo, Norway
- Genres: Hip-hop
- Years active: 1994–2006, 2009 (reunion)
- Past members: Alis; Aslak Hartberg; Dr. S; Sveinung Eide; "Dansken"; Esben Selvig; "Goldfinger" or "Finger'n"; Thomas Gullestad; «Micro» Simen Rex

Klovner I Kamp is a Norwegian hip-hop group from Tåsen in Oslo. Formed in 1994, at the time as a duo with Alis (Aslak Hartberg) and Dr. S (Sveinung Eide). Shortly after the band got a new member, "Dansken" ("The Dane", being born in Denmark), Esben Selvig. Klovner I Kamp was a trio for several years, but in 2000, "Goldfinger" or "Finger'n" (Thomas Gullestad) and «Micro» Simen Rex joined as their DJ and masseur.

Klovner I Kamp won the Spellemannprisen for hip hop in 2001.

The band had their final concert at Rockefeller, 1 September 2006. On 4 July 2009, they played a reunion concert at the Roskilde Festival in Denmark.

== Discography ==
=== Albums ===
Year	Album	Peak position
Year	Album	NO
1999	Bare meg EP	—
2000	Schwin	22
2001	Tykt og tynt EP	—
2001	Bjølsen hospital	9
2003	Kunsten å fortelle	7
2003	Fritt vilt EP	—
2005	Ørnen tek ikkje unga	7
2016	Kjærlighetstrilogien EP	—

=== Singles ===
Year	Album	Peak position
Year	Album	NO
2001	Tykt og tynt	14
2003	Fritt vilt	14
2005	Et juleevangelium	4
2015	Langt å gå	—
