= International Blackjazz Society =

Studio album by Shining
- Released: October 23, 2015
- Genre: Avant-garde metal, alternative metal, industrial metal, progressive metal, industrial rock
- Length: 38:04
- Label: Spinefarm Records
- Producer: Jørgen Munkeby

Shining chronology
One One One (2013)	International Blackjazz Society (2015)	Animal (2018)

International Blackjazz Society is the seventh studio album by Norwegian avant-garde metal band Shining. It was released on October 23, 2015 through Spinefarm Records.

The first album of the band without original drummer Torstein Lofthus, it is also the first album with his replacement Tobias Ørnes Andersen and keyboardist Eirik Tovsrud Knutsen, and the last with bassist Tor Egil Kreken, who had been a part of the band for all of their metal-oriented albums.

== Critical reception ==
Professional ratings
Aggregate scores
Source	Rating
Metacritic	77/100
Review scores
Source	Rating
AllMusic	4/5 stars
Alternative Press	4/5 stars
Classic Rock	3/5 stars
Kerrang!	KKKK
MetalSucks	4/5 stars
Pitchfork	7.0/10
PopMatters	7/10 stars
Slant	4/5 stars

Upon the release, International Blackjazz Society received generally positive reviews. At Metacritic, which assigns a normalized rating out of 100 to reviews from mainstream publications, the album received an average score of 77, based on 8 reviews.

== Track listing ==
All tracks are written by Jørgen Munkeby

No.	Title	Length
1.	"Admittance"	1:06
2.	"The Last Stand"	4:17
3.	"Burn It All"	5:15
4.	"Last Day"	4:09
5.	"Thousand Eyes"	6:49
6.	"House of Warship"	4:34
7.	"House of Control"	6:50
8.	"Church of Endurance"	0:58
9.	"Need"	4:06
Total length:		38:04

== Personnel ==
=== Musicians ===
- Jørgen Munkeby – vocals, guitars, saxophone, keys, bass guitar
- Håkon Sagen – guitars
- Tor Egil Kreken - bass guitar
- Eirik Tovsrud Knutsen – keyboards, synthesizer
- Tobias Ørnes Andersen – drums

=== Production staff ===
- Jørgen Munkeby – Producer
- Sean Beavan - Executive Producer
