= Jørgen Munkeby =

Norwegian musician (born 1980)

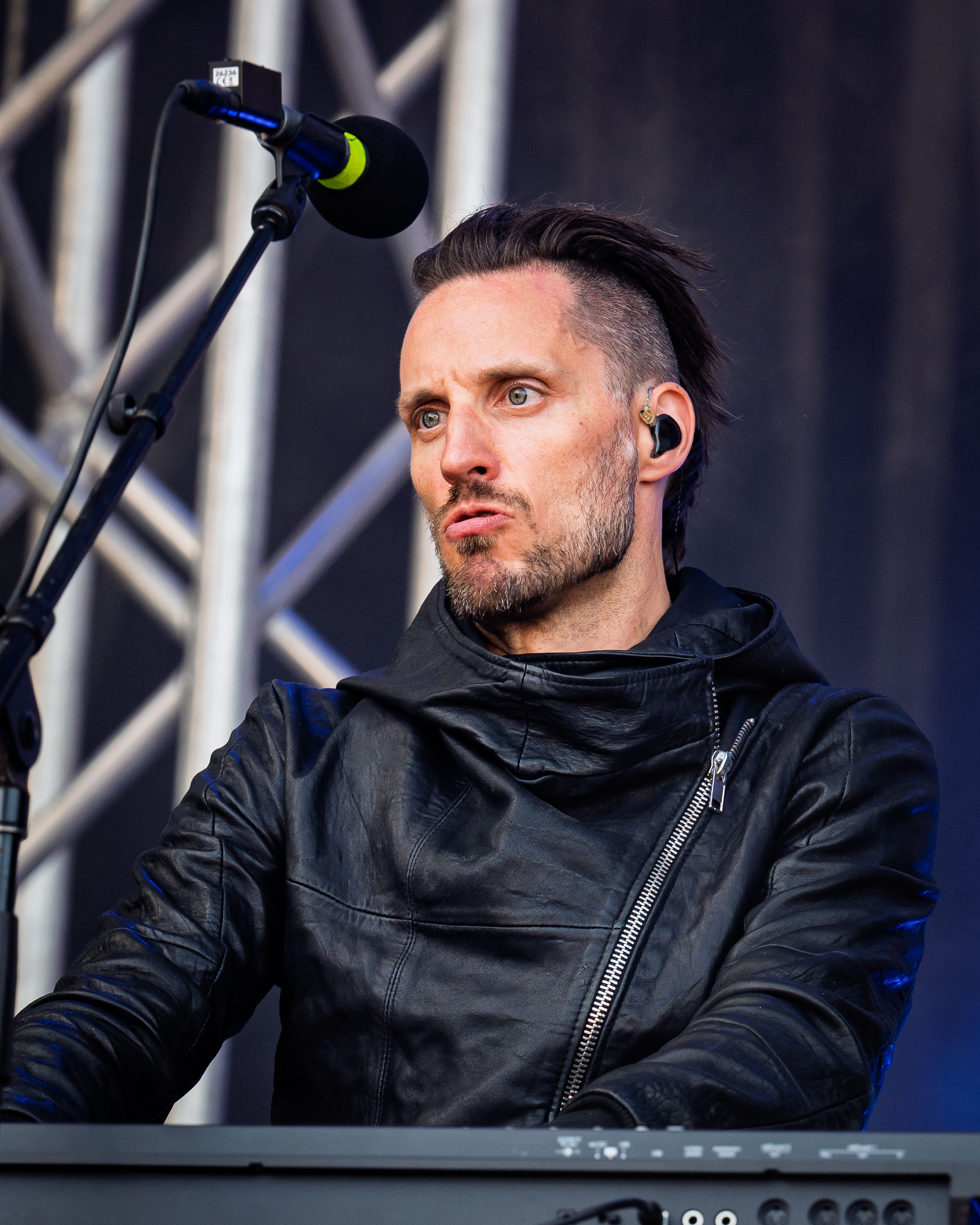
- Munkeby with Emperor at the Tons of Rock festival in Oslo (2025)

Background information
- Born: 3 September 1980 (age 45); Oslo, Norway
- Genres: Jazz metal, rock, electronic rock, progressive metal
- Occupations: Musician, songwriter, producer
- Instruments: Tenor saxophone, flute, alto flute, guitar, bass clarinet, keyboards, vocals
- Labels: Jazzland, Rune Grammofon, Indie Recordings

Jørgen Munkeby (born 3 September 1980 in Oslo, Norway) is a Norwegian jazz rock and heavy metal musician, singer, songwriter, and record producer. He is best known as the frontman in the band Shining and as a former member of Jaga Jazzist.

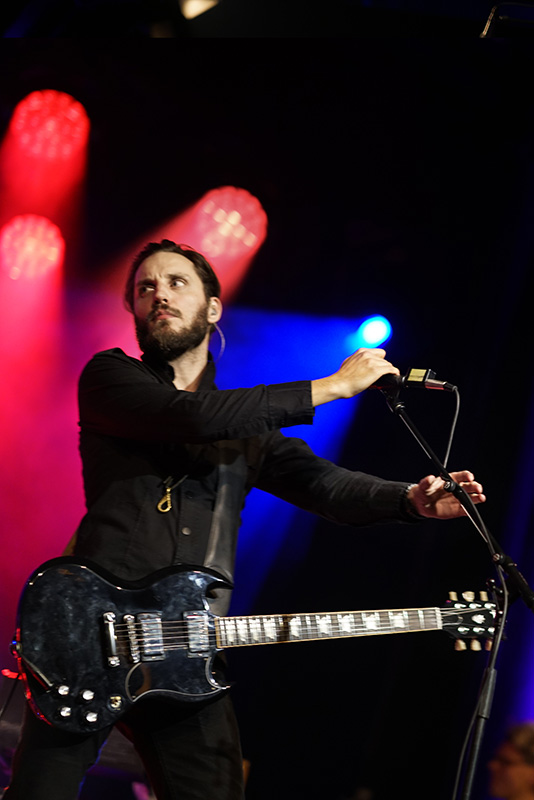
Munkeby in Aarhus, Denmark (2018)

== Career ==
Munkeby formed Shining as a jazz quartet in 1999, together with fellow students from the Norwegian Academy of Music, Morten Qvenild, Torstein Lofthus and Aslak Hartberg. Shining's style later evolved from traditional jazz into a heavier style influenced by progressive metal, extreme metal and industrial music, while keeping the jazz elements of their previous work. Munkeby has coined this genre as "Blackjazz", the same as the title of the band's fourth album. Munkeby is the sole consistent member of Shining.

Munkeby played flute, alto flute, tenor saxophone, bass clarinet and keyboards in jazz band Jaga Jazzist from 1994–2002. He was one of the main composers on the album A Livingroom Hush, which was named the best jazz album of 2002 by the BBC. He has also played in the bands Damp and Chrome Hill.

Since 2018, Munkeby has been the live keyboardist and backing vocalist for Emperor.

Munkeby has worked with several artists in multiple difference genres as a session musician. This has included Motorpsycho, Enslaved, Ihsahn, In Lingua Mortua, Bertine Zetlitz, Big Bang, Superfamily, Grand Island, Jim Stärk and Casualties of Cool.

== Discography (in selection) ==
Within Jaga Jazzist

- 1996: Jævla Jazzist Grete Stitz (Thug Records).
- 1998: Magazine EP (Dbut Records).
- 2001: A Livingroom Hush (Warner Music Norway).
- 2001: Airborne/Going Down EP (Warner Music Norway).
- 2001: Going Down 12" (Smalltown Supersound).
- 2002: The Stix (Smalltown Supersound / Warner Music Norway).
- 2002: Days 12", (Smalltown Supersound).

Within Shining

- 2001: Where The Ragged People Go (BP Records).
- 2003: Sweet Shanghai Devil (Jazzland Records).
- 2005: In the Kingdom of Kitsch You Will Be a Monster (Rune Grammofon).
- 2007: Grindstone (Rune Grammofon).
- 2010: Blackjazz (Indie Recordings).
- 2011: Live Blackjazz (Indie Recordings).
- 2013: One One One (Universal Records).
- 2015: International Blackjazz Society (Spinefarm Records).
- 2018: Animal (Spinefarm Records).

With other projects

- 2002: In The Fishtank (Konkurrent), with Motorpsycho & "Jaga Jazzist Horns».
- 2004: Little Things (Propeller Recordings), with Hanne Hukkelberg.
- 2010: After, with Ihsahn.
- 2012: Eremita, with Ihsahn.
- 2014: Inferno (Prosthetic Records), with Marty Friedman.
- 2015: "Viscera", with Haunted Shores.
- 2016: Arktis (Candlelight Records), with Ihsahn.
- 2016: Melancholy, with Poetry in Telegrams.
- 2017: Wall of Sound (Prosthetic Records), with Marty Friedman.
- 2017: In Contact (Inside Out Music), with Caligula's Horse.
- 2017: Of Inner Sight, with Between The Planets.
- 2018: Queen of Time (Nuclear Blast), with Amorphis.
- 2018: Become (eOne), with Zardonic.
- 2021: Trivial Optical Tricks, with Poetry In Telegrams.
- 2021: Where Shadows Fade ([Blackstargazer Records]), with Herr Nox.
- 2021: "You Make Me Feel", with Omnerod, Eerik Maurage, & Nicolas Draps.
- 2022: Magnum Opus (Black Lion Records), with IATT.
- 2022: The Final Lullaby, with Epica.
- 2022: Praise Armageddonism (Loyal Blood Records), with Blood Command.
- 2023: "Wildfire", with Periphery.
- 2023: "The Great Escape", with Nerve End.
- 2023: Hypnagogia (Apollon Records: PROG), with Pixie Ninja.
- 2024: "Anxiety Express", with Theo van Niel Jr.
- 2024: "GlassCannon", with Monsters Around Us.
- 2026: "Verses Under Analemma", with SXIMA.
