= Esben Selvig =

Norwegian rapper and singer

Esben Ullbæk Bundgaard-Jørgensen Selvig, stage name Dansken (born 17 June 1978) is a Norwegian-Danish rapper and singer. His nickname, meaning "The Dane", refers his being born in Denmark, but moving to Norway as a child. Selvig is best known as a singer in Yoga Fire and a rapper in Klovner I Kamp, in both bands together with Aslak "Alis" Hartberg. Klovner i Kamp won the Spellemannprisen for hip-hop in 2001 and the Edvard Prize in 2002 for the song lyrics «Nattens sønner». He has also written for the talk show Torsdagsklubben. In 2011, he hosted the show Dansken & Fingern together with Klovner I Kamp's DJ, Thomas "Fingern" Gullestad, and won a Gullruten award. In 2013, he was a judge on Idol (season 7).

He married in 2012, and has one son.
