= Live Blackjazz =

Live album by Shining
- Released: November 11, 2011
- Genre: Avant-garde metal, extreme metal, alternative metal, industrial metal, progressive metal
- Length: 52:24
- Label: Universal/Indie Recordings
- Producer: Jørgen Munkeby; Sebastian Hoth

Shining chronology
Blackjazz (2010)	Live Blackjazz (2011)	One One One (2013)

Live Blackjazz is a live album by the Norwegian band Shining, released through Universal/ Indie Recordings on November 11, 2011.

== Critical reception ==
Professional ratings
Review scores
Source	Rating
Mind Over Metal	4.5/5 stars
Dagbladet	5/6 stars

The live version of the album Blackjazz is smashing, All About Jazz critique John Kelman, in his review of Shining's album Live Blackjazz states:

... there's little doubt that his references are more Albert Ayler than Accept, more Brainkiller than Black Sabbath. Still, there's no doubting Munkeby and Shining's predilection for metal's defining characteristics, but there's an underlying intelligence that makes them more than just a fist-pumping, head-banging touchstone...

Here the band culls five tracks from Blackjazz, and another five from Grindstone (2007) and In the Kingdom of Kitsch You Will Be a Monster (2005). This islive versions of tunes that differ markedly from recordings on previous studio albums, yet maintain the essential characteristics that are the hallmark of Shining's music.

The reviewer Mats Johnasen of MindOverMetal.org awarded the album 4.5 stars, and the Norwegian newspaper Dagbladet giving the album dice 5.

== Track listing ==
=== CD version ===
1. "Fisheye" (3:51)
2. "The Madness And The Damage Done" (5:42)
3. "In The Kingdom Of Kitsch You Will Be A Monster" (5:53)
4. "The Red Room" (3:03)
5. "Goretex Weather Report" (5:37)
6. "Winterreise" (6:13)
7. "Exit Sun" (9:35)
8. "Healter Skelter" (6:35)
9. "21st Century Schizoid Man" (11:57) - music by: Greg Lake, Ian McDonald, Michael Rex Giles, Peter John Sinfield & Robert Fripp

=== DVD version ===
1. "The Madness And The Damage Done" (6:01)
2. "Fisheye" (7:46)
3. "In The Kingdom Of Kitsch You Will Be A Monster" (7:11)
4. "The Red Room" (3:08)
5. "Omen" (8:54)
6. "Goretex Weather Report" (5:37)
7. "Winterreise" (6:16)
8. "Exit Sun" (9:34)
9. "Healter Skelter" (6:41)
10. "21st Century Schizoid Man" (15:10) - music by: Greg Lake, Ian McDonald, Michael Rex Giles, Peter John Sinfield & Robert Fripp
11. "RMGDN" (19:53) - Encore

=== LP version ===
Side A

1. "Fisheye" (3:51)
2. "The Madness And The Damage Done" (5:42)
3. "In The Kingdom Of Kitsch You Will Be A Monster" (5:53)

Side B

1. "The Red Room" (3:03)
2. "Omen" (8:54)
3. "Goretex Weather Report" (5:37)

Side C

1. "Winterreise" (6:13)
2. "Exit Sun" (9:35)

Side D

1. "Healter Skelter" (6:35)
2. "21st Century Schizoid Man" (11:57) - music by: Greg Lake, Ian McDonald, Michael Rex Giles, Peter John Sinfield & Robert Fripp

== Personnel ==
- Jørgen Munkeby – Vocals, guitars, saxophone
- Torstein Lofthus – Drums
- Tor Egil Kreken – Bass
- Bernt Moen – Keyboards
- Håkon Sagen – Guitar

== Credits ==
- Graphics design – Trine + Kim Design Studio
- Film director & editor – Anders Børresen (DVD)
- Mastered by – Tom Baker
- Mixed by – Sean Beavan
- Music by – Jørgen Munkeby where not other are indicated
- Producer – Jørgen Munkeby
- Recorded by – Christian Snilsberg & Espen Høydalsvik
