= In Lingua Mortua =

Norwegian band

- Origin: Hønefoss, Norway
- Genres: Black metal; progressive metal; avant-garde metal
- Years active: 1999–present
- Label: Termo Records
- Members: Marius Glenn Olaussen; Raymond Håkenrud; Lars Fredrik Frøislie
- Past members: Trondr Nefas; Uruz; Jonny Pedersen; Kristian Karl Hultgren; Sareeta

In Lingua Mortua is a Norwegian band formed by Lars Fredrik Frøislie in 1999 at Hønefoss, Norway. The music can be described as a mixture of 1970s progressive rock and black metal, and vintage instruments like the Mellotron, Chamberlin, Minimoog, Clavinet and Hammond organ are used frequently, as well as saxophone, bass clarinet, steel guitar, Ludwig drums and Rickenbacker bass.

The first album Bellowing Sea - Racked by Tempest was written in 1999–2000, and released in 2007 on Termo Records. The second album Salon des Refusés was written between 2001 and 2005, and was released in 2010.

The band features members from Shining (SE), Shining (NO), White Willow, Wobbler, Ásmegin, Xploding Plastix, Kvist, Urgehal and Keep of Kalessin.

Jørgen Munkeby from Shining (NO) was influenced by the Salon des refusés session, quoting: “Lars’ refreshing blend of an impressive intellectual display and direct raw power has been a big inspiration for me. Lars is a true pioneer. He was the first person to invite me to play sax in a black metal setting, and in so doing, contributed strongly to SHINING’s later development of the Blackjazz genre.”

== Name ==
Lingua Mortua is Latin for "Dead Language". Whether the band's intention is an homage to Mussorgsky's piece "Cum mortuis in lingua mortua" from Pictures at an Exhibition is unclear.

== Discography ==
- 2007: Bellowing Sea - Racked by Tempest
- 2010: Salon des Refusés
