= Animal (Shining album) =

Studio album by Shining
- Released: 19 October 2018
- Genre: Alternative rock; hard rock; progressive rock; arena rock; industrial rock; pop rock
- Length: 37:34
- Label: Spinefarm
- Producer: Jørgen Munkeby

Shining chronology
International Blackjazz Society (2015)	Animal (2018)

Professional ratings
Aggregate scores
Source	Rating
Metacritic	77/100
Review scores
Source	Rating
Distorted Sound	8/10
Louder Sound	4/5 stars
MetalSucks	3/5 stars
The Metal Report	8/10

Animal is the eighth studio album by Norwegian rock band Shining. It was released on 19 October 2018 through Spinefarm Records. It is their final album with drummer Tobias Ørnes Andersen, keyboardist Eirik Tovsrud Knutsen, and guitarist Håkon Sagen. It marks a departure from their jazzy metal-oriented sound for what frontman Jørgen Munkeby describes as "more Muse than Meshuggah, more Ghost than Gojira, and more Biffy Clyro than Burzum!" The title track was released as a single on 10 August 2018.

== Track listing ==
Animal track listing
No.	Title	Length
1.	"Take Me"	3:32
2.	"Animal"	3:32
3.	"My Church"	3:36
4.	"Fight Song"	3:50
5.	"When the Lights Go Out"	3:40
6.	"Smash It Up!"	3:24
7.	"When I'm Gone"	3:42
8.	"Everything Dies"	3:50
9.	"End"	4:22
10.	"Hole in the Sky"	4:06
Total length:		37:34

== Personnel ==
=== Musicians ===
- Jørgen Munkeby – vocals, guitars
- Håkon Sagen – guitars
- Ole Vistnes – bass
- Eirik Tovsrud Knutsen – keyboards, synthesizer
- Tobias Ørnes Andersen – drums
