= Sweet Shanghai Devil =

Studio album by Shining
- Released: 2003
- Recorded: 2002
- Genre: Jazz, avant-garde jazz
- Label: Jazzland

Shining chronology
Where The Ragged People Go (2001)	Sweet Shanghai Devil (2003)	In The Kingdom Of Kitsch You Will Be A Monster (2005)

Sweet Shanghai Devil is the second album by the Norwegian band Shining. It was released in 2003 by Jazzland Records.

== Track listing ==
1. "Firewalker" - 2:42
2. "Where Do You Go Christmas Eve?" - 5:29
3. "Jonathan Livingston Seagull" - 4:54
4. "Sink" - 5:50
5. "Shanghai Devil" - 3:53
6. "Misery's Child" - 5:39
7. "Cellofan Eyes" - 5:57
8. "Herbert West-Reanimator/After the Rain" - 9:18

== Personnel ==
- Jørgen Munkeby - saxophone, flute, clarinet, guitar
- Aslak Hartberg - acoustic bass
- Torstein Lofthus - drums
- Morten Qvenild - piano
