= Rune Nergaard =

Norwegian jazz musician

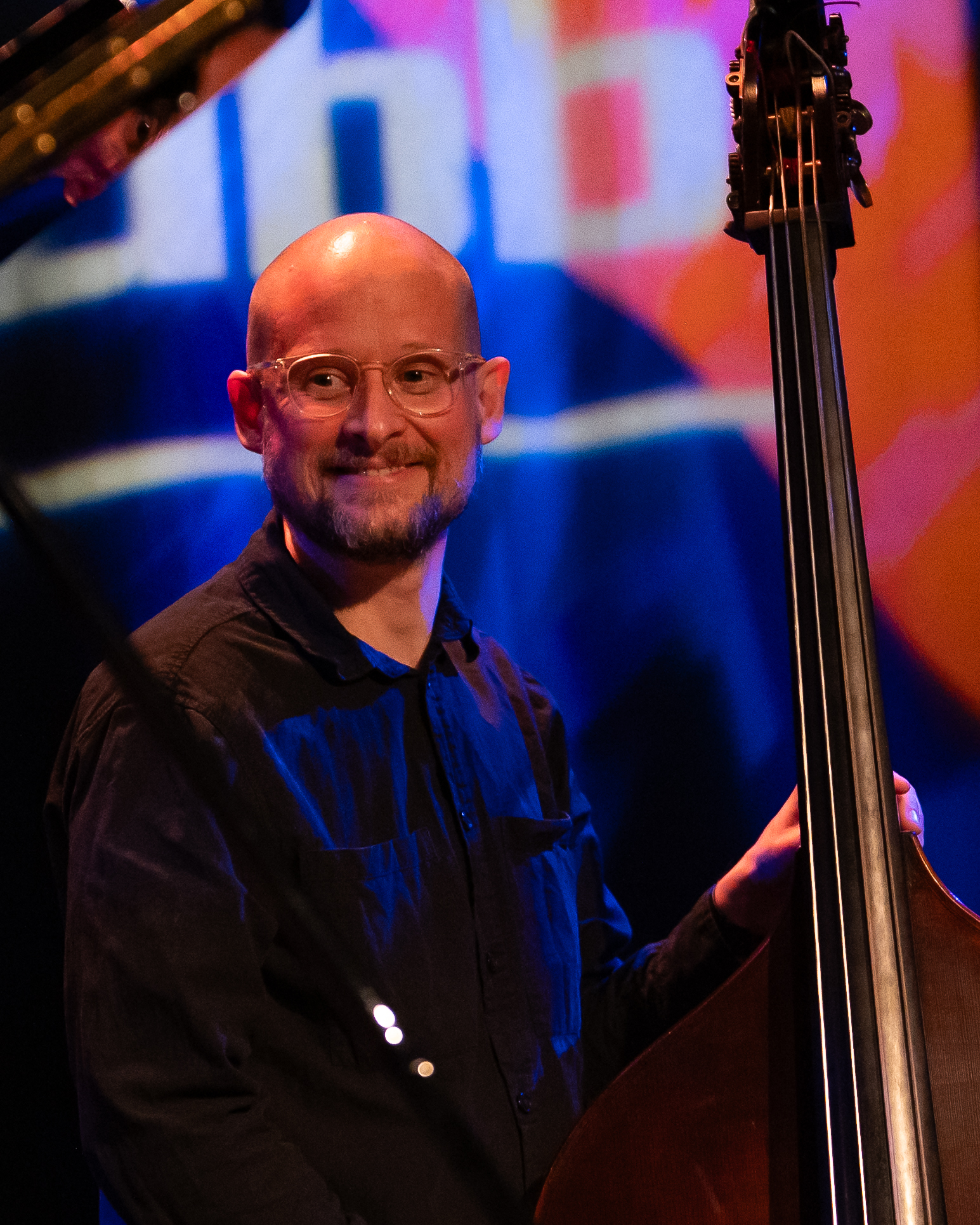
- Nergaard with Kjetil Mulelid Trio, 2025

Background information
- Born: 26 May 1983 (age 42); Bodø, Nordland
- Origin: Norway
- Genres: Jazz
- Occupations: Musician, composer
- Instruments: Upright bass, Guitar Bass
- Website: www.groove.no/artist/71376367/rune-nergaard

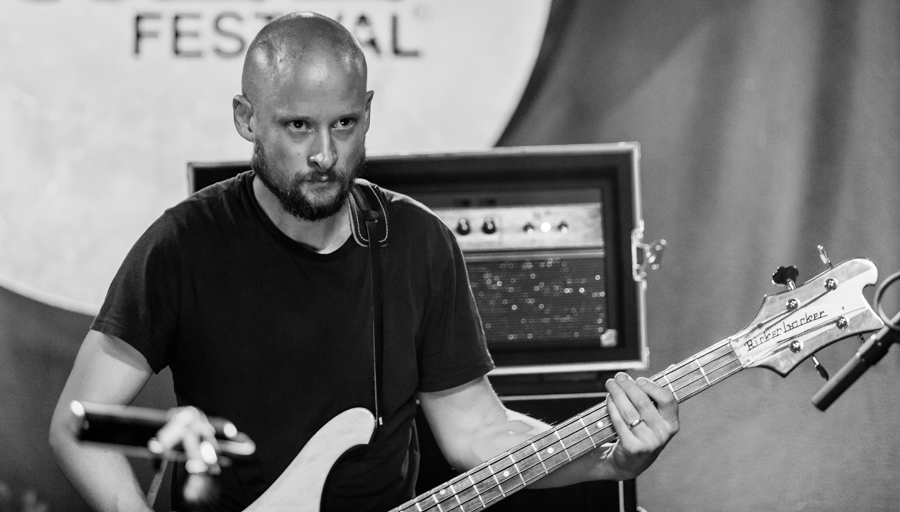
Rune Nergaard performing in 2019

Rune Nergaard (born 26 May 1983 in Bodø, Norway) is a Norwegian jazz musician (upright bass), known from bands like Bushman's Revenge, Marvel Machine, Scent of Soil, and Team Hegdal.

== Career ==
Nergaard was educated on the jazz program at Trondheim Conservatory of Music (2003). He has been recognized through his collaboration with many of the most up-and-coming Norwegian musicians and bands.

== Discography ==
Within Bushman's Revenge

- 2007: Cowboy Music (Jazzaway Records)
- 2009: You Lost Me at Hello (Rune Grammofon)
- 2010: Jitterbug (Rune Grammofon)
- 2012: A Little Bit of Big Bonanza (Rune Grammofon)
- 2012: Never Mind The Botox (Rune Grammofon)
- 2013: Electric Komle – Live! (Rune Grammofon)
- 2013: Thou Shalt Boogie! (Rune Grammofon)
- 2016: Jazz, Fritt Etter Hukommelsen (Rune Grammofon)
- 2016: Bushman's Fire (Rune Grammofon), live LP with Kjetil Møster and David Wallumrød

Within Team Hegdal

- 2010: Vol 1 (Øra Fonogram)
- 2011: Vol 2 (Øra Fonogram)

Within Montée

- 2014: Into The Fray (Sony Music, Norway)

With other projects

- 2007: Silent Sunday (Magica Records), with Marita Røstad
- 2011: Scent of Soil (Hubro), with Tore Brunborg, Kirsti Huke, Petter Vågan & Gard Nilssen
