= Elephant9 =

Norwegian band

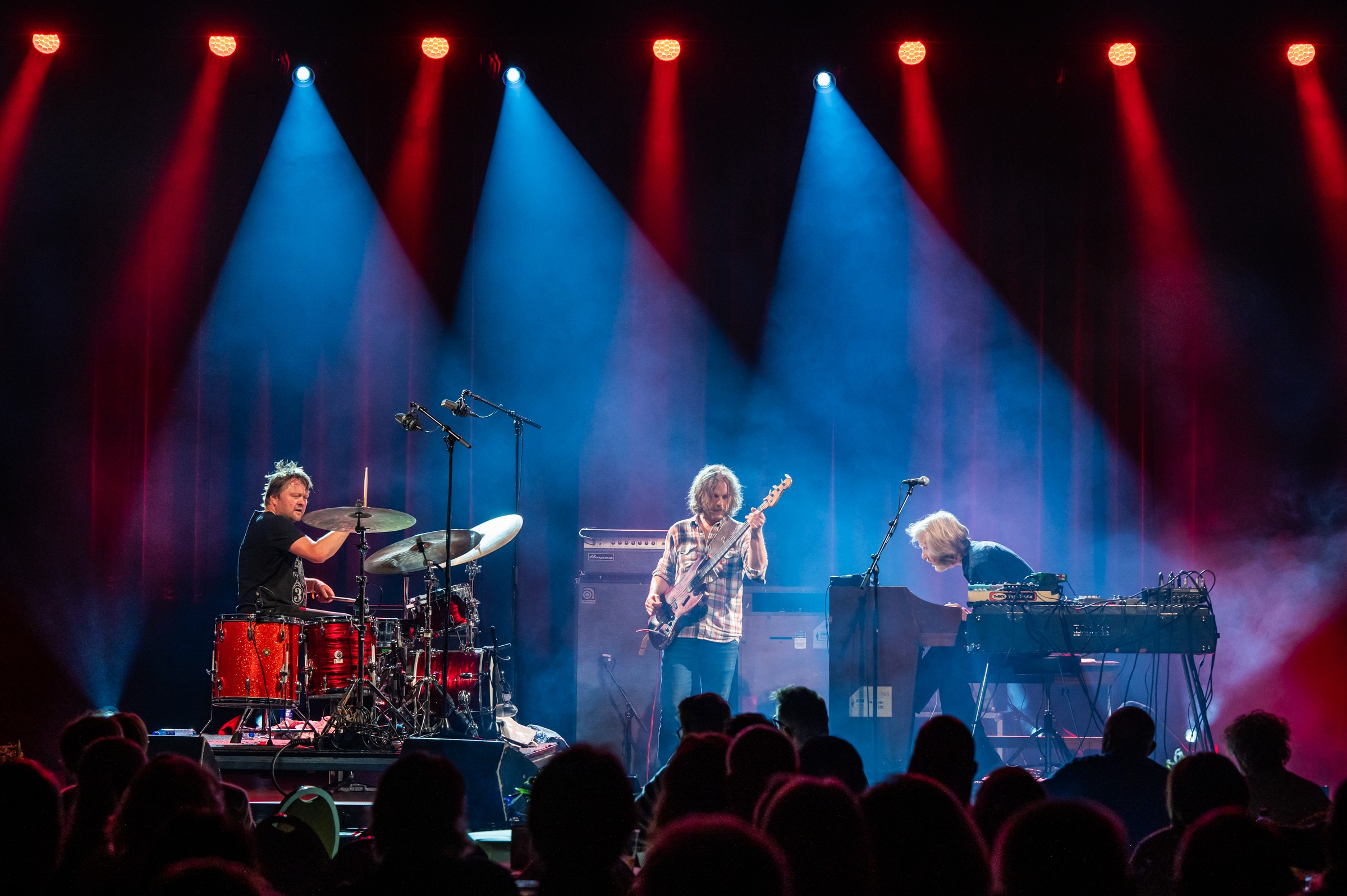
- elephant9, Canal Street festival 2023

Background information
- Origin: Oslo, Norway
- Genres: Prog-rock, jazz-rock
- Years active: 2006–present
- Label: Rune Grammofon
- Members: Ståle Storløkken; Nikolai Eilertsen; Torstein Lofthus

Elephant9 (stylized as elephant9) is a Norwegian progressive/neo-psychedelic/jazz-rock trio formed in Oslo in 2006. The band was originally known as Storløkken/Eilertsen/Lofthus, after its members: Ståle Storløkken (keyboard), Nikolai Hængsle (Eilertsen) (bass) and Torstein Lofthus (drums), before adopting the name Elephant9 after their first year together.

== Biography ==
The trio released their debut album Dodovoodoo in 2008, and followed up with Walk the Nile in 2010, both on the label Rune Grammofon. Walk the Nile was awarded Spellemannprisen 2010 in the class Jazz, and received widespread critical acclaim, including reviews highlighting its crossover appeal between jazz and rock audiences. They performed in London with Motorpsycho in 2010.

Their third studio album Atlantis, released in 2012, featured Swedish veteran prog-rock guitarist Reine Fiske. The release was accompanied by a series of concert performances at Kongsberg Jazzfestival, and other Norwegian festivals like Vossajazz and Nattjazz. The band also performed at venues including Union Scene in Drammen and Victoria – Nasjonal jazzscene in Oslo.

Fiske also contributed guitar on the 2015 album Silver Mountain.

The albums Psychedelic Backfire I and Psychedelic Backfire II were recorded live at Kampen Bistro on 9–12 January 2019. On Psychedelic Backfire II, guitarist Reine Fiske again appeared as a guest. Psychedelic Backfire I was nominated for the Spellemannprisen 2019 in the jazz category.

The 2024 album Catching Fire was recorded live at Victoria – Nasjonal jazzscene in Oslo on 20 January 2017, and features guitarist Terje Rypdal, who joined the performance.

== Musical style ==
elephant9 plays a blend of jazz and rock with elements of psychedelic music. Stylistically, they have been described as “a simmering stew of prog, heavy rock, psychedelia and jazz rock,” and reviewer Jan Stangeby Nielsen of Musikkavisen Puls characterized the band as “catchy and innovative in the way they combine prog, jazz, psychedelia and fusion.”

In an interview, Ståle Storløkken summed up the expression they aim for as “Massive. Exploring. Space travel.”

elephant9’s albums are often recorded using a live-oriented approach, and the first two studio albums were explicitly recorded live in the studio. Later releases still suggest a performance-driven working method with few takes, but it is not documented across the entire catalogue that all studio albums are live recordings in the strict sense.

== Members ==
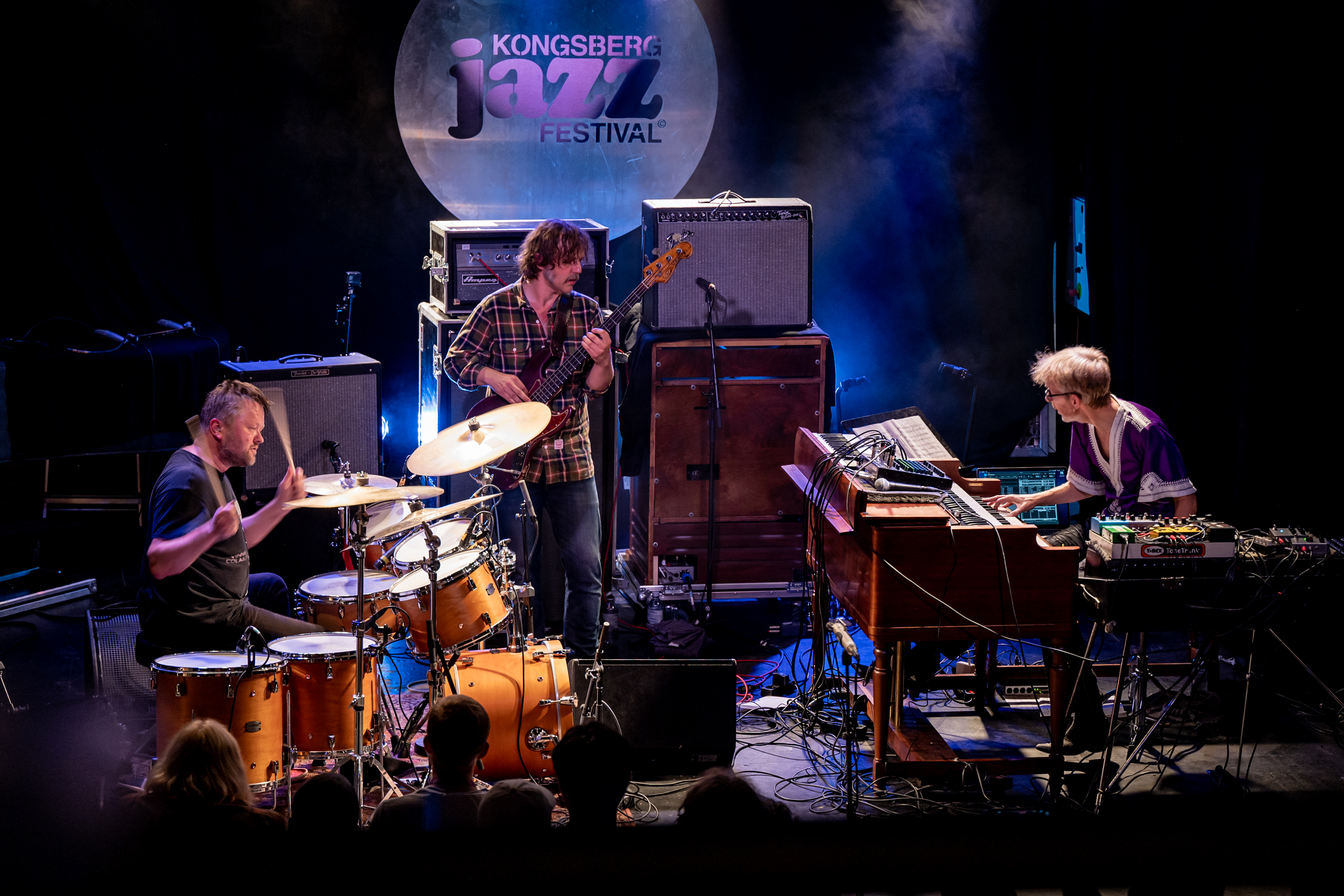
elephant9 performs at Energimølla during Kongsberg Jazzfestival 2024 Photo: Birgit Fostervold

- Ståle Storløkken – hammond L100, rhodes, mellotron, minimoog, Eminent 310, elpiano, ARP Pro soloist, grand piano, harpspiano, celeste, continuo organ
- Nikolai Hængsle – bass
- Torstein Lofthus – drums, percussion

=== Guest musicians ===
- Reine Fiske – guitar (Atlantis, Silver Mountain, Psychedelic Backfire I)
- Terje Rypdal – guitar (Catching Fire)

== Honors ==
- Spellemannprisen 2010 in the class Jazz for the album Walk the Nile
- Spellemannprisen 2012 nomination in the class Jazz for the album Atlantis
- Spellemannprisen 2019 nomination in the class Jazz for the album Psychedelic Backfire I

== Discography ==
- 2008: Dodovoodoo (Rune Grammofon)
- 2010: Walk the Nile (Rune Grammofon)
- 2011: Live at the BBC (Rune Grammofon)
- 2012: Atlantis (Rune Grammofon), with Reine Fiske
- 2015: Silver Mountain (Rune Grammofon), with Reine Fiske
- 2018: Greatest Show On Earth (Rune Grammofon)
- 2019: Psychedelic Backfire I (Rune Grammofon)
- 2019: Psychedelic Backfire II (Rune Grammofon)
- 2021: Arrival of the New Elders (Rune Grammofon)
- 2024: Mythical River (Rune Grammofon)
- 2024: Catching Fire with Terje Rypdal (Rune Grammofon)

Awards
Preceded by Tord Gustavsen Ensemble	Recipient of the Jazz Spellemannprisen; 2010	Succeeded by Ola Kvernberg
