= In the Kingdom of Kitsch You Will Be a Monster =

Studio album by Shining
- Released: 24 January 2005
- Genre: Avant-garde; progressive rock; experimental rock; art rock; jazz
- Length: 39:01
- Label: Rune Grammofon
- Producer: Kåre Vestrheim

Shining chronology
Sweet Shanghai Devil (2003)	In the Kingdom of Kitsch You Will Be a Monster (2005)	Grindstone (2007)

Professional ratings
Review scores
Source	Rating
AllMusic	4/5 stars
Pitchfork Media	8.3/10
Stylus	B+

In the Kingdom of Kitsch You Will Be a Monster is an album by the Norwegian band Shining. It was released in 2005 by Rune Grammofon. The title is taken from a line in Milan Kundera's novel The Unbearable Lightness of Being.

It is the last album with the band's original lineup, as keyboardist Morten Qvenild would leave before the release, and bassist Aslak Hartberg shortly after.

== Production ==
There are many cultural references in the track titles as well. "Goretex Weather Report" probably refers to the band Weather Report, "REDRUM" is a repeated line in The Shining, a part in "Romani" is very inspired by a part in Gustav Mahler's 6th symphony, "Perdurabo" was Aleister Crowley's magical pseudonym in the Hermetic Order of the Golden Dawn, "Aleister Explains Everything" refers Crowley as well, the numbers in the title of track six (31=300=20) is a Gematria reference (Shin), "It is by Will Alone I Set My Mind in Motion" is a line (more exactly a Mentat Mantra) from the movie Dune, "Where Death Comes to Cry" is a phrase in Leonard Cohen's song "I'm Your Man" and "The Smoking Dog" is a poem by Aleister Crowley from The Book of Lies. "Magazine RWRK" simply means that the track is a rework of the Jaga Jazzist album Magazine from 2004. The final track, "You Can Try the Best You Can", may be a reference to Radiohead, the title in fact being a lyric from the song "Optimistic", found on the album Kid A.

== Track listing ==
All tracks are written by Jørgen Munkeby.

No.	Title	Length
1.	"Goretex Weather Report"	5:01
2.	"REDRUM"	1:37
3.	"Romani"	3:19
4.	"Perdurabo"	3:02
5.	"Aleister Explains Everything"	3:24
6.	"31=300=20 (It is by Will Alone I Set My Mind in Motion)"	4:25
7.	"Where Death Comes to Cry"	2:23
8.	"The Smoking Dog"	3:57
9.	"Magazine RWRK"	6:32
10.	"You Can Try the Best You Can"	5:21
Total length:		39:01

== Personnel ==
Shining

- Jørgen Munkeby – saxophone, flutes, clarinet, Akai EWI, electric and acoustic guitars, bass, Rhodes, synthesizers, piano, accordion, Mellotron, harmonium, church organ, celesta, vocals, string and drum programming
- Aslak Hartberg – acoustic and electric bass, drum machine, percussion, handclaps
- Morten Qvenild – Rhodes, synthesizers, Clavinet, piano, celesta
- Torstein Lofthus – drums, percussion

Additional personnel

- Andreas Hessen Schei – additional synths (4)
- Kari Knardahl – French horn (9)
- Karl Ivar Refseth – gran cassa, tam-tam, tubular bells, gong (9)
- Michelle Lindboe – trombone (9)
- Sjur Miljeteig – trumpet (9)
- Peder Kjellsby, Sjur Miljeteig – co-production (3, 6, 9)
- Mike Hartung – mixing
- Kåre Vestrheim – recording, mixing, production
- Mike Hartung – mastering
