= Bushman's Revenge =

Norwegian jazz/progressive rock band

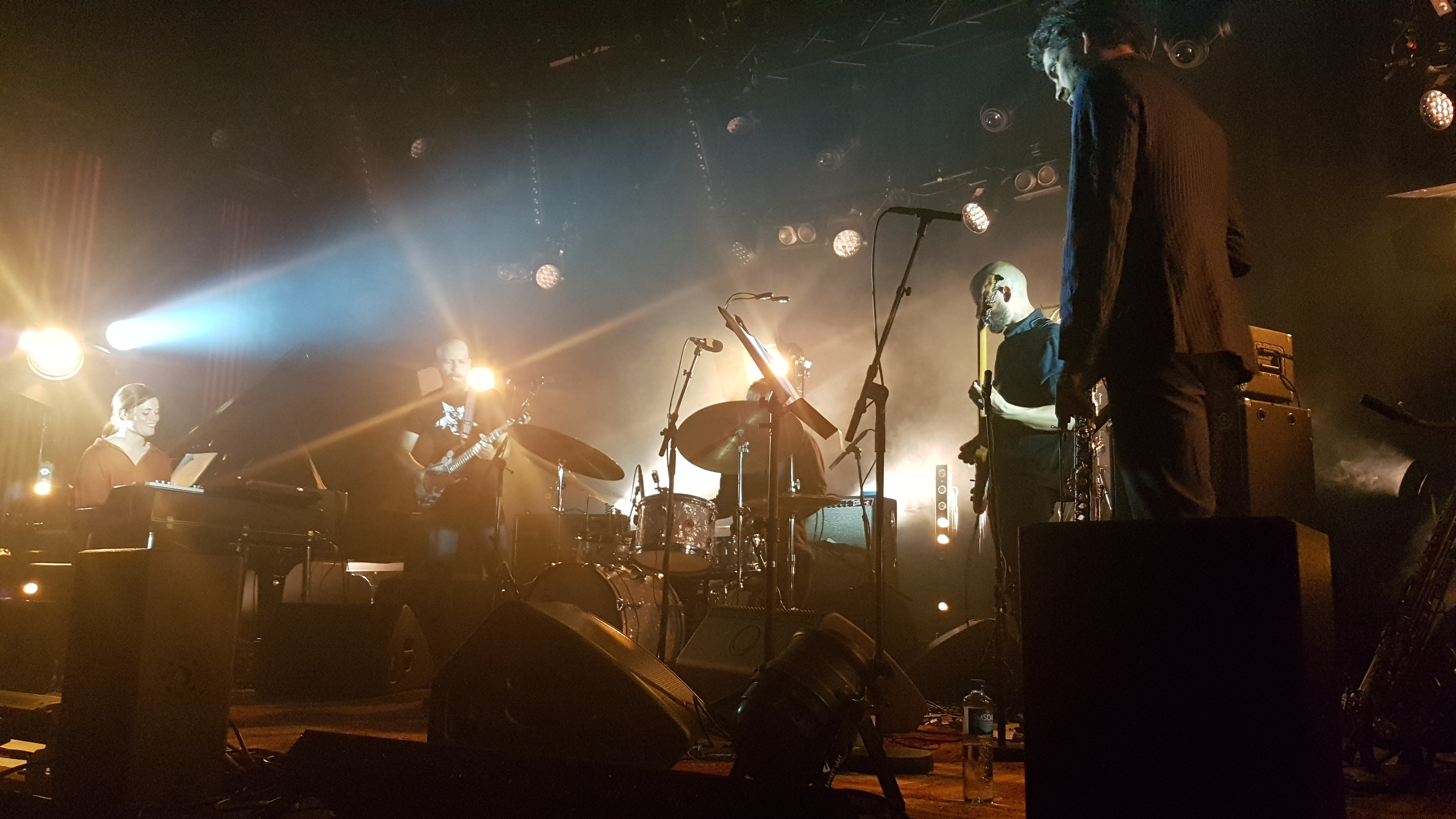
- Bushman's Revenge at the 2019 Moldejazz

Background information
- Origin: Oslo, Norway
- Genres: Jazz; Electronica; Experimental rock
- Years active: 2003–present
- Label: Rune Grammofon
- Members: Even Helte Hermansen; Rune Nergaard; Gard Nilssen
- Website: www.bushmansrevenge.com

Bushman's Revenge is a Norwegian jazz and progressive rock band.

== Career ==
Bushman's Revenge mix rock and jazz. On the album Jitterbug (2010) Ståle Storløkken appears on two tracks. Ola Kvernberg and Kjetil Møster appeared with Bushman's Revenge at Moldejazz 2012, and Kjetil Møster and David Wallumrød at Kongsberg Jazzfestival 2013.

John Kelman of All About Jazz named the Bushman's Revenge concert at Moldejazz July 2013 one of his 25 Best Live Shows of 2013.

== Band members ==
- Even Helte Hermansen – guitar
- Rune Nergaard – bass
- Gard Nilssen – drums

== Discography ==
- 2007: Cowboy Music (Jazzaway)
- 2009: You Lost Me at Hello (Rune Grammofon)
- 2010: Jitterbug (Rune Grammofon)
- 2012: A Little Bit of Big Bonanza (Rune Grammofon)
- 2012: Never Mind the Botox (Rune Grammofon)
- 2013: Thou Shalt Boogie! (Rune Grammofon)
- 2013: Electric Komle – Live! (Rune Grammofon)
- 2016: Jazz, Fritt Etter Hukommelsen (Rune Grammofon)
- 2016: Bushman's Fire LP (Rune Grammofon)
- 2019: Et hån mot overklassen (Hubro Music)
- 2023: All the Better for Seeing You (Is It Jazz? Records)
