= Tor Egil Kreken =

Norwegian musician (born 1977)

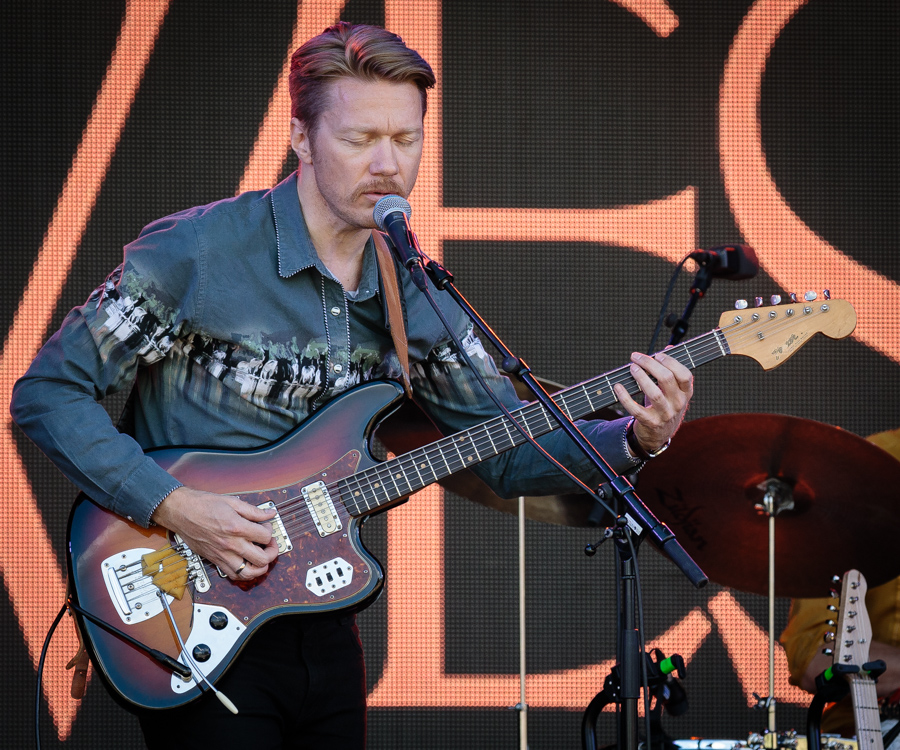
- Tor Egil Kreken performing in 2018

Background information
- Born: 30 March 1977 (age 48)
- Origin: Norway
- Genres: Jazz
- Occupation: Musician
- Instrument(s): Bass guitar, banjo, guitar
- Labels: Jazzland; Sonne Music; Kirkelig Kulturverksted

Tor Egil Kreken (born 30 March 1977) is a Norwegian musician (bass, banjo, guitars).

== Biography ==
Kreken was born in Norway. He plays within the bands Eivind Aarset Trio (bass), Faircastle Four (guitar, banjo), Shining (bass), The Holstein United Bluegrass Boys (banjo, vocal) Wibutee (bass, banjo) and Darling West (guitar, banjo, vocal).

== Honors ==
- 2013: Received the Statoil scholarship within the band Shining, at By:larm in Oslo

== Discography ==
With Maria Solheim

- 2002: Behind Closed Doors (Kirkelig Kulturverksted)
- 2004: Frail (Kirkelig Kulturverksted)
- 2006: Will There Be Spring? (Kirkelig Kulturverksted)

Within Wibutee

- 2006: Sweet Mental (Sonne Music), feat. Anja Garbarek

With Sternklang

- 2006: Transistor Beach (dBut)

With Eivind Aarset

- 2007: Sonic Codex (Jazzland Recordings)

With Maria Arredondo

- 2007: For a Moment (Mountain Music)

Within Garness

- 2008: The Good Or Better Side of Things (Kirkelig Kulturverksted)
- 2009: Barnet I Krybben (Plush Badger Music)

Within Grand Telemark

- 2008: Grand Telemark (Sonne)

Within Shining

- 2011: Live Blackjazz (Indie Recordings)
- 2013: One One One (Indie Recordings)
- 2015: International Blackjazz Society (Spinefarm Records)

With Hellbillies

- 2010: Leite Etter Lykka (EMI Norge)

With Haddy N'jie

- 2010: World of the Free (Trust Me Records)

With Maria Mena

- 2011: Viktoria (Columbia)

With Marit Larsen

- 2011: Spark (EMI Norge)

With other projects

- 2005: Down Like a Dog (Grand Slam Happy Time), Tor Konstalij
- 2008: Sådagen (Etnisk Musikklubb), with Eilif Gundersen
- 2009: Markblomster Og Potteplanter (POLselection), with Dennis Storhøi, Hilde Norland Gundersen, Espen Gjelstad Gundersen & Frøydis Grorud
- 2010: Tomorrow Is (Sony Music), with Christel Alsos
- 2011: Fatal Fix (2011), Paranoid James
- 2012: Jeg Har Vel Ingen Kjærere (Plush Badger Music), Anne Gravir Klykken
- 2013: Tåra, Pess Og Blod (Silsand Sild Og Cd), Senjahopen ("Gamlingen")
