= Torstein Lofthus =

Norwegian drummer and composer

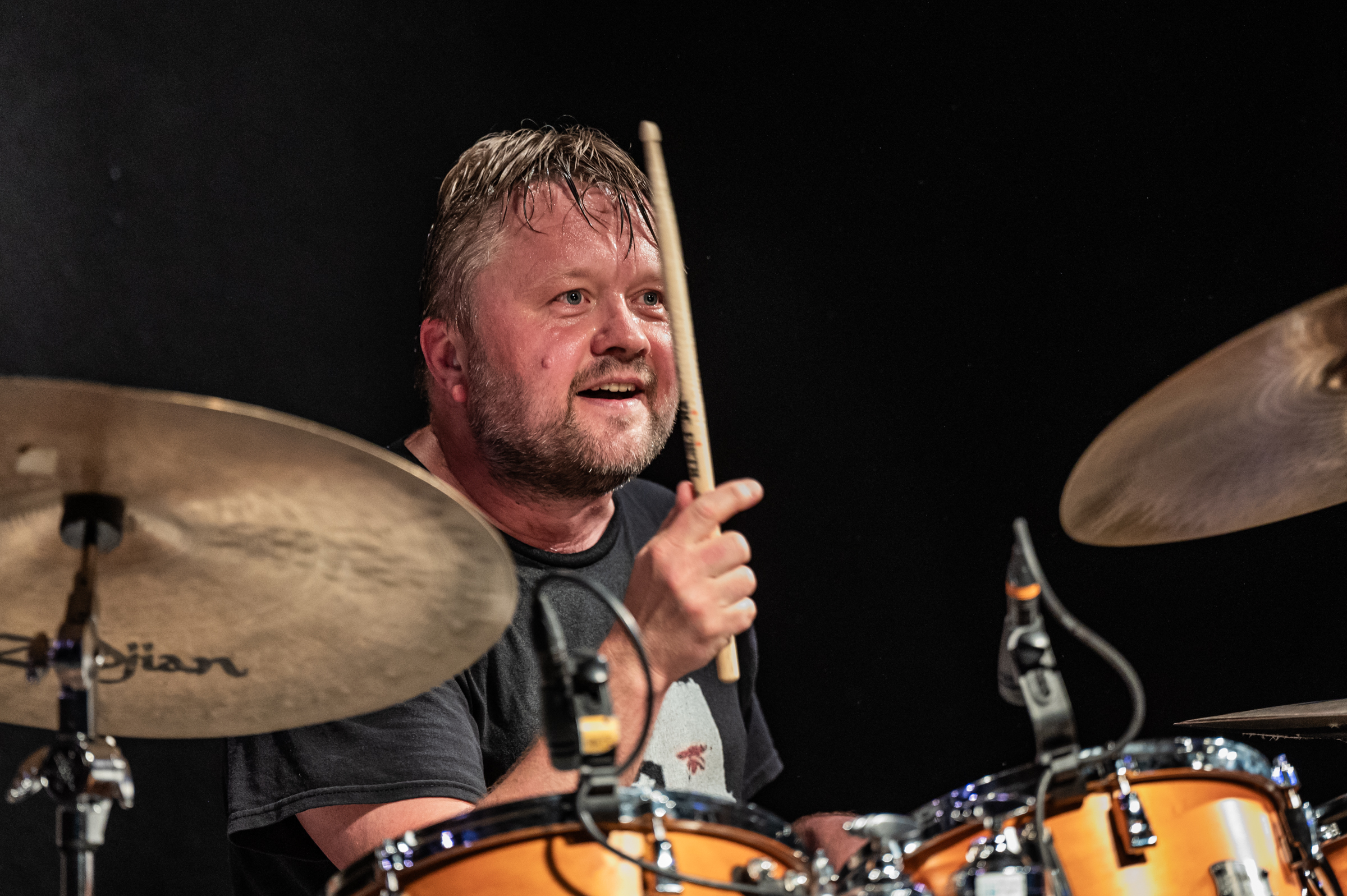
- Lofthus with elephant9 at Kongsberg Jazzfestival 2024

Background information
- Born: 10 March 1977 (age 49); Øystese, Hordaland, Norway
- Genres: Progressive rock, jazz
- Instrument: Drums
- Years active: 1987–present

Torstein Lofthus (born 10 March 1977) is a Norwegian drummer and composer associated with bands like elephant9, Red Kite, Mathias Eick Band, and the trio Eberson/Zanussi/Lofthus. He was previously a member of the band Shining. Lofthus is a popular studio musician, and is often seen behind the drums in TV shows' house bands, e.g. for "Hver gang vi møtes".

== Career ==
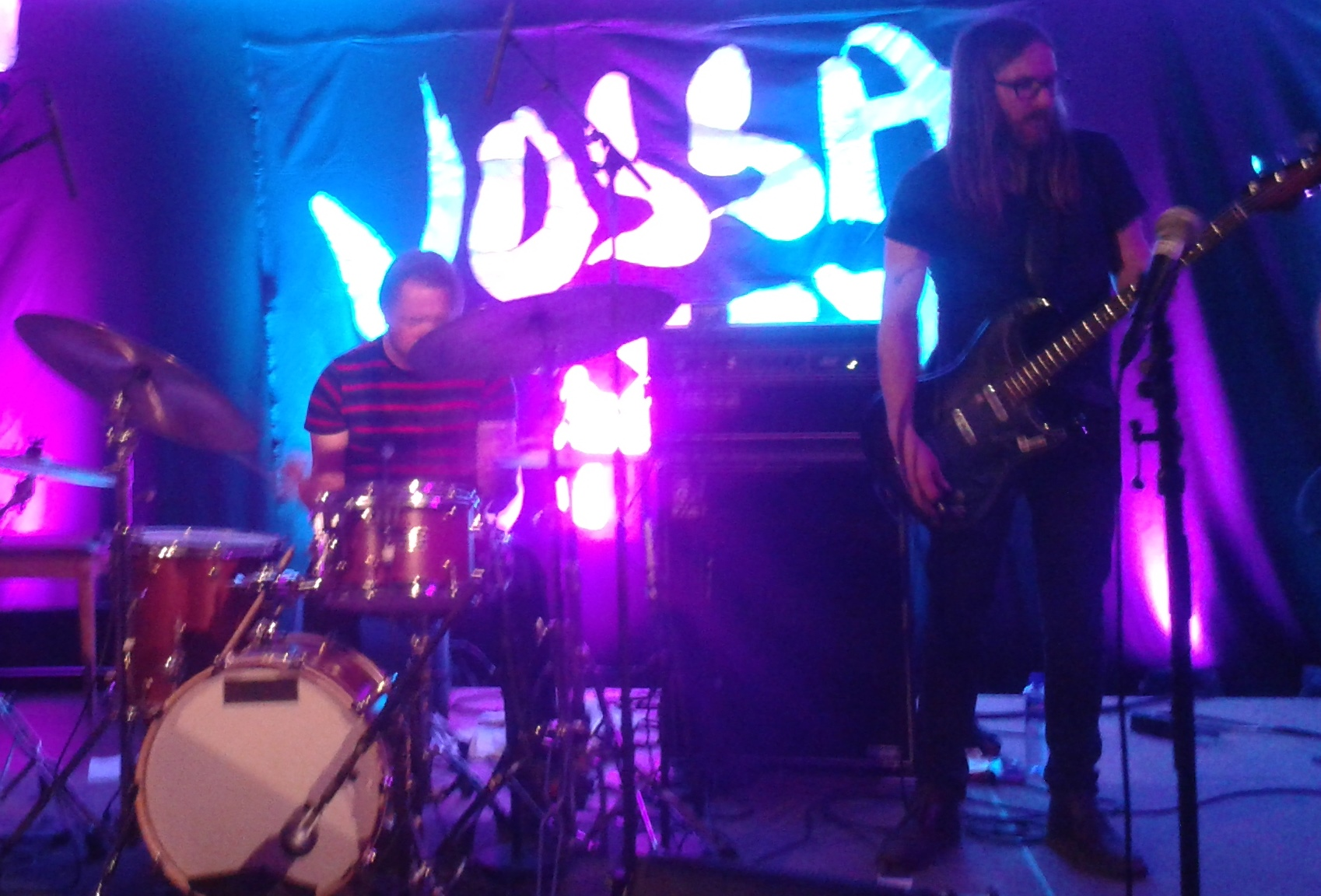
Lofthus and Trond Frønes perform with Red Kite at Vossajazz 2016.

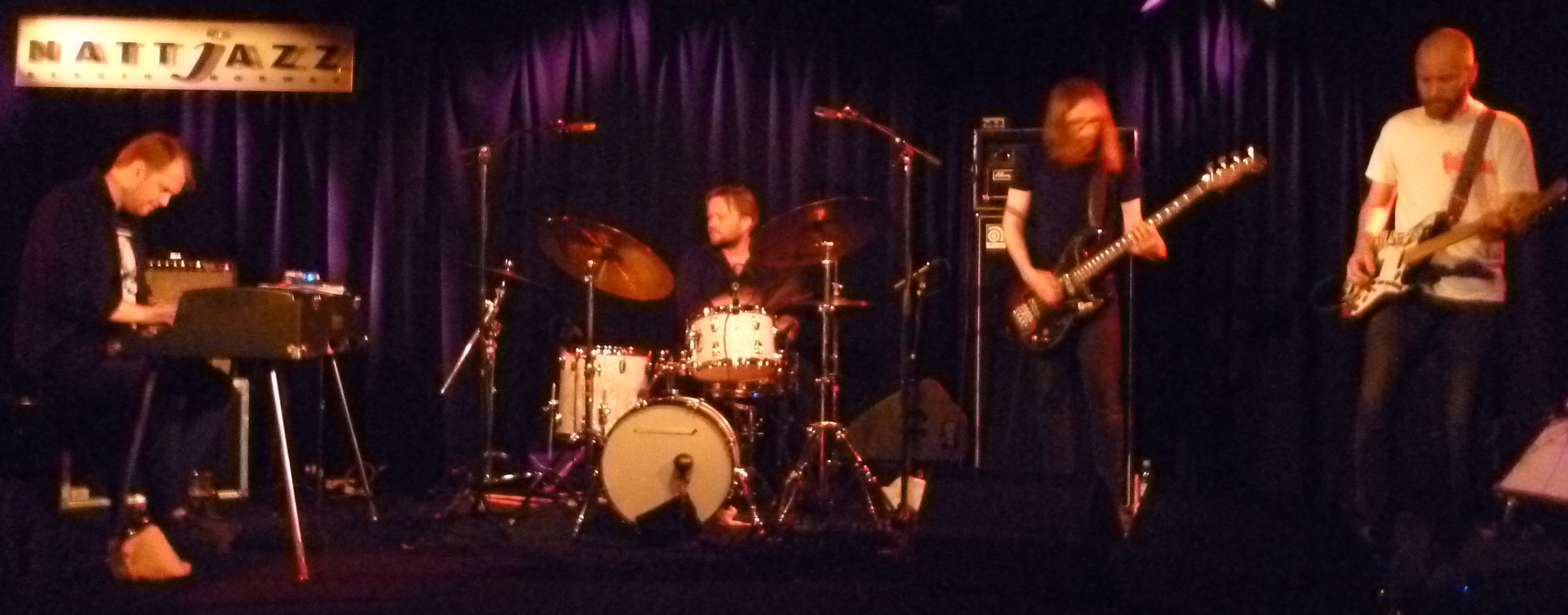
Lofthus, Moen, Frønes, and Hermansen, with Red Kite at the 2016 Nattjazz

Lofthus has had a significant influence on Norwegian music through studio work, live concerts, and teaching at the Norwegian Academy of Music and the University of Agder (Faculty of Fine Arts). Based in Oslo, he now tours Norway and Europe with different bands and artists after finishing his master's at the Norwegian Academy of Music in spring 2006. He plays several genres, well known with both jazz and pop music. He has been the most sought drummer in Norway recent years, if not on tour with Vamp, Jarle Bernhoft, Oslo Gospel Choir, Mathias Eick, Marit Larsen or Odd Nordstoga, he collaborates with Maria Mena, Kurt Nilsen, Torun Eriksen, Bertine Zetlitz, Silje Nergaard, Eivind Aarset, D'Sound, Noora Noor, The Norwegian Radio Orchestra, Jon Eberson and Per Zanussi, to mention a few, both in studio and on stage.

He has worked with Shining, elephant9, Red Kite, Marit Larsen, Maria Mena, Jarle Bernhoft, Chrome hill, Mathias Eick Band, D'Sound, Oslo Gospel Choir, Jørn Øien Trio, Liarbird, Torun Eriksen, Ebersson/Zanussi/Lofthus, Garness, Søyr, Morten Halle, Eivind Aarset, Silje Nergaard, Beady Belle, Damp, Bertine Zetlitz, Kurt Nilsen, Maria Solheim, and Papangu.

== Awards and honors ==
- 2010: Spellemannprisen in the category Jazz for the album Walk the Nile with Elephant9
- 2011: Spellemannprisen as Innovator of the Year with Shining
- 2015: Gammleng-prisen in the category studio musician

== Discography ==
=== Shining ===
- One One One (2013)
- Live Blackjazz (2011)
- Blackjazz (2010)
- Grindstone (2007)
- In the Kingdom of Kitsch You Will Be a Monster (2005)
- Sweet Shanghai Devil (2003)
- Where the Ragged People Go (2002)

=== elephant9 ===
- 2008: Dodovoodoo (Rune Grammofon)
- 2010: Walk the Nile (Rune Grammofon)
- 2011: Live at the BBC (Rune Grammofon)
- 2012: Atlantis (Rune Grammofon), with Reine Fiske
- 2015: Silver Mountain (Rune Grammofon), with Reine Fiske
- 2018: Greatest Show On Earth (Rune Grammofon)
- 2019: Psychedelic Backfire I (Rune Grammofon)
- 2019: Psychedelic Backfire II (Rune Grammofon)
- 2019: Psychedelic Backfire III (Rune Grammofon)
- 2021: Arrival of the New Elders (Rune Grammofon)
- 2024: Mythical River (Rune Grammofon)
- 2024: Catching Fire with Terje Rypdal (Rune Grammofon)

=== Thom Hell ===
- All Good Things (2010)

=== Aleksander With ===
- Still Awake (2010)

=== Torun Eriksen ===
- Passage (2010) (1 song)
- Prayers & Observations (2005)
- Glittercard (2003)

=== Jørn Øien trio ===
- Digging in the Dark (2010)

=== Chrome Hill ===
- Earthlings (2008)

=== Damp ===
- Hoatzin (2005)
- Mostly Harmless (2003)

=== Mathias Eick ===
- Skala (2011)
- Ravensburg (2018)

=== Ola Kvernberg's Liarbird ===
- Liarbird (Jazzland, 2011), the commissioned work, live from Moldejazz 2010 including Bergmund Waal Skaslien (viola), Eirik Hegdal (saxophone), Håkon Kornstad (saxophone), Mathias Eick (trumpet), Ingebrigt Håker Flaten and Ole Morten Vågan (bass), as well as Erik Nylander (drums)

=== Jarle Bernhoft ===
- Solidarity Breaks (2011)
- 1: Man 2: Band (2010)

=== Marit Larsen ===
- Under the Surface (2006)
- The Chase (2008)

=== Garness ===
- Barnet i krybben (2009)
- The good or better side of things (2008)

=== Eberson/Zanussi/Lofthus ===
- Bring it on (2006)

=== Silje Nergaard ===
- Darkness Out of Blue (2007)

=== Linn Skåber and Dennis Storhøi ===
- Petter Snus og vårmelodien (2007)

=== Maria Solheim ===
- Frail (2004)
- Behind Closed Doors (2002)

=== Rockettothesky ===
- To Sing You Apple Trees (2006)

=== Samsaya ===
- Shedding Skin (2004)

=== Gisle Torvik ===
- Naken Uten Gitar (1999)

=== Various artists ===
- Stolpesko (2002)

Awards
Preceded by Ole Petter Andreassen and Kim Ofstad	Recipient of the Studio musician Gammleng-prisen; 2015	Succeeded by -
