= Where the Ragged People Go =

Where The Ragged People Go

Studio album by Shining
- Released: 5 November 2001
- Recorded: May 2001
- Studio: Norges Musikkhøgskole, Oslo
- Genre: Free jazz
- Length: 50:09
- Label: BP Productions
- Producer: Shining

Shining chronology
Where The Ragged People Go (2001)	Sweet Shanghai Devil (2003)

Where the Ragged People Go is the first album by the Norwegian band Shining. It was released in 2001 on BP Productions.

The album title, "Where the Ragged People Go", is a line from the song The Boxer by Simon & Garfunkel.

== Track listing ==
All tracks are composed by Jørgen Munkeby.

No.	Title	Length
1.	"Spooks In The Hall"	5:03
2.	"The Fool"	5:21
3.	"Small Steps"	4:13
4.	"Dalton City"	7:05
5.	"Randomizer"	4:35
6.	"Song Of A Long Gone Girl"	8:00
7.	"Hell's Bells"	8:00
8.	"The Fool"	6:34
Total length:		50:09

== Personnel ==
- Jørgen Munkeby - saxophone, flute, clarinet
- Aslak Hartberg - acoustic bass
- Torstein Lofthus - drums
- Morten Qvenild - piano
