= Bernt Moen =

Norwegian pianist and composer (born 1974)

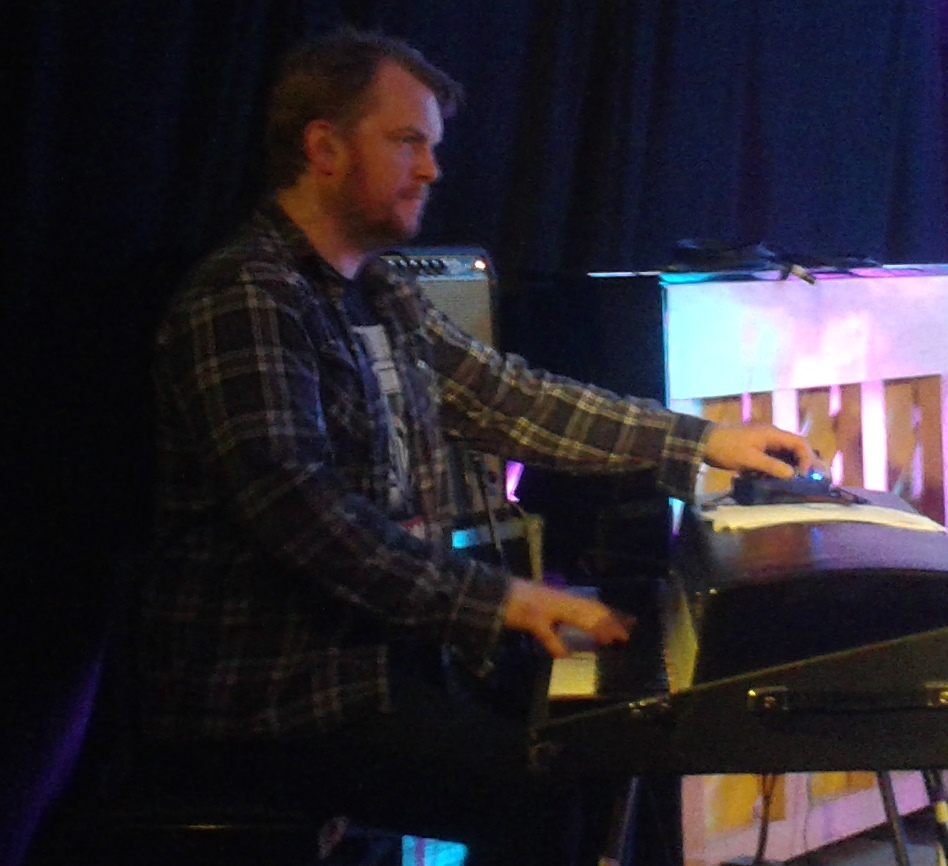
- Bernt Moen with Red Kite at Vossajazz 2016.

Background information
- Born: Bernt André Moen; 17 February 1974 (age 52); Kristiansand, Vest-Agder, Norway
- Genres: Jazz; Black metal
- Occupations: Musician, composer
- Instruments: Piano, keyboards
- Labels: Earache Records; Season of Mist
- Website: www.berntmoen.no

Bernt André Moen (born 17 February 1974) is a Norwegian musician. He is known as a jazz pianist, composer and music teacher.

== Career ==
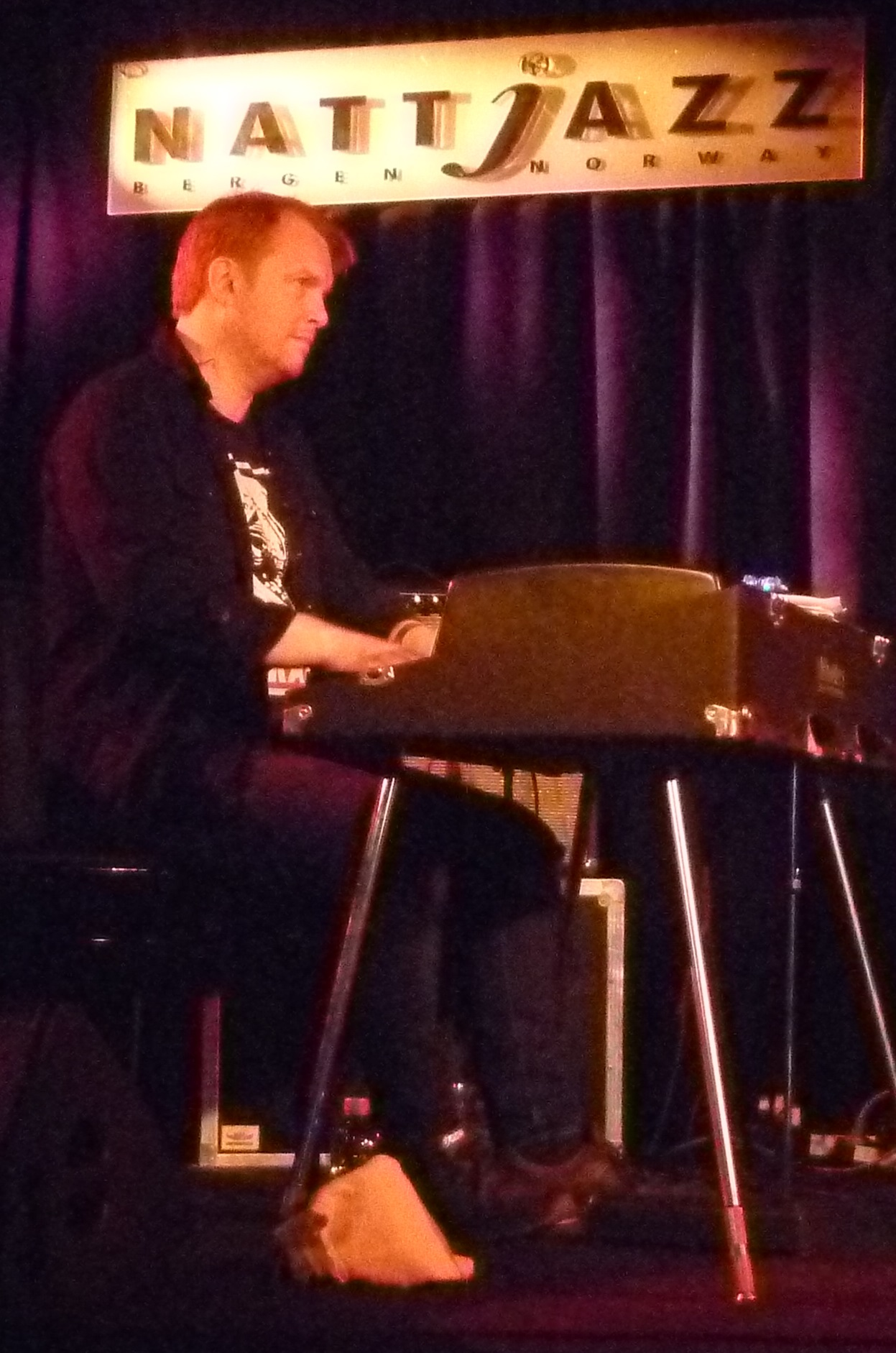
Moen with Red Kite at the 2016 Nattjazz.

Moen was born in Kristiansand. He has been involved in a series of metal bands, and is now professor in performing rhythmic piano at the University of Agder.

Within his own studio ("Studio 3014") and own label (BAM Records), he made his debut as solo artist in 2011, with three album releases, Closure featuring recordings from the period 2006–10, together with Fredrik Sahlander (bass) and Trygve Tambs-Lychè (drums), except the uptempo avalanche "FXG", where Geir Åge Johnsen takes care of the drums. The two solo albums are from a more recent date, recorded in January (Vol.1) and May (Vol.2). The repertoire on both is dominated by relatively short improvisations, often lyrical, quiet and with very deliberate use of pauses. But both also show a pianist with technique, including sound therapy, which enables him to exploit the instrument's sonic potential of slender tone migrations to deafening crescendi.

== Honors ==
- 2011: Spellemannprisen "This year's innovator" within Shining

== Discography ==
=== Solo albums ===
- 2011: Solopiano Vol.1 (BAM Records)
- 2011: Solopiano Vol.2 (BAM Records)
- 2014: Solopiano Vol.3 (BAM Records)
- 2019: Sunhill (BAM Records)

With Bernt Moen Trio including Fredrik Sahlander (bass) and Trygve Tambs-Lychè (drums)

- 2011: Closure (BAM Records)

With Bernt Moen Trio including Fredrik Sahlander (bass) and Jan Inge Nilsen (drums)

- 2021: The Storm (Losen Records Records)

With BWM Trio including Klaus Robert Blomvik (drum) and Roger Williamsen (bass)

- 2012: Jazz! 'Øh (BAM Records), recorded in 2000
- 2013: Whether It Is Necessary Remains To Be Seen (BAM Records)

With Dualistic including Tobias Øymo Solbakk (drums) and Fredrik Sahlander (bass)

- 2019: Dualistic (Losen Records)

With Johnsen/Sahlander/Moen

- 2019: 1+1=3 (Losen Records)
- 2020: Second Time`s the Charm (Losen Records)

=== Collaborations ===
With Green Carnation

- 2001: Light of Day, Day of Darkness (Prophecy Productions)
- 2003: A Blessing in Disguise (Season of Mist)
- 2005: The Quiet Offspring (Season of Mist)
- 2006: The Acoustic Verses (The End Records)

With Erik Faber

- 2002 Between The Lines (Sony Music Entertainment Norway)
- 2004 Century (Sony Music Entertainment Norway)
- 2006 Passages (Sony BMG Music Entertainment Norway)

With Mike & The Blue Family

- 2004 Family Business (BAM Records)
- 2006 Business As Usual (BAM Records)

With Ronnie Jacobsen Vs. Salvador

- 2004 Adjust Your Stereo (MTG Productions)

With Ronnie Jacobsen

- 2005 Soulified (MTG Productions)

With Rolf Kristensen

- 2005 Shimmering Minor (Ponca Jazz Records)
- 2018 Timelines (Losen Records)

With Blood Red Throne

- 2005: Altered Genesis (Earache)

With Thulsa Doom

- 2005 Keyboard, Oh Lord! Why Don't We? (Duplex Records)
- 2017 A Keen Eye for the Obvious (Duplex Records)

With Jørn Skogheim

- 2007 Above Water (Curling Legs)
- 2010 New Direction (Curling Legs)

With Trail of Tears

- 2007: Existentia (Napalm Records)

With Magne Furuholmen

- 2008 A Dot of Black in the Blue of Your Bliss (Passionfruit Records)

With Lene Marlin

- 2009: Twist the Truth (EMI)

With Petter Carlsen

- 2009: You Go Bird (EMI Music, Norway)
- 2011: Clocks Don't Count (Friskt Pust Records)
- 2018: Glimt Av Glimt, String Arrangements (Friskt Pust Records
- 2020: The Sum of Every Shade, String Arrangements (Friskt Pust Records)

With Nypan

- 2010: Elements (Ponca Jazz Records)
- 2017: Stereotomic (Losen Records)

With Shining

- 2011: Live Blackjazz (Indie Recordings)

With Phone Joan

- 2012: +4791799466 (Vorecords)

With Per Kjetil Farstad

- 2012: Swing Picking Guitar (No1 Music Group)

With Tom Hugo

- 2012: Sundry Tales (HW Records)

With The Scheen

- 2012: The Scheen (ArtistPartner Records)

With Tristania

- 2013: Darkest White (uncredited, Napalm Records)

With Alice & the Mountain

- 2013: Hunt You (2013 Karma Kosmetix Music)
- 2015: Devil's Favorite (Massiveskills Version) (BAM Records)
- 2019: Stranger Single (BAM Records)
- 2019: Lonely Single (BAM Records)

With Haddy

- 2015: Nattblomst (GRAPPA)

With SAH!

- 2015: Past:Present (BAM Records)
- 2015: Present:Future feat/Kirk Covington (BAM Records)
- 2020: LIVE! (BAM Records)
- 2021: Past Present Future (Losen Records)

With Addiktio

- 2018: Verraton (Raindrops Music)

With Carina Frantzen

- 2019: Blacklist (Mørketid)

With Red Kite

- 2019: Red Kite (RareNoiseRecords)
- 2021: Apophenian Bliss (RareNoiseRecords)

With Paper Crown

- 2021: Dreamers (Paper Crown Music)

With Various Artists

- 2021: Lockdown Live (Ponca Jazz Records)
