= Solveig Slettahjell =

Norwegian jazz singer

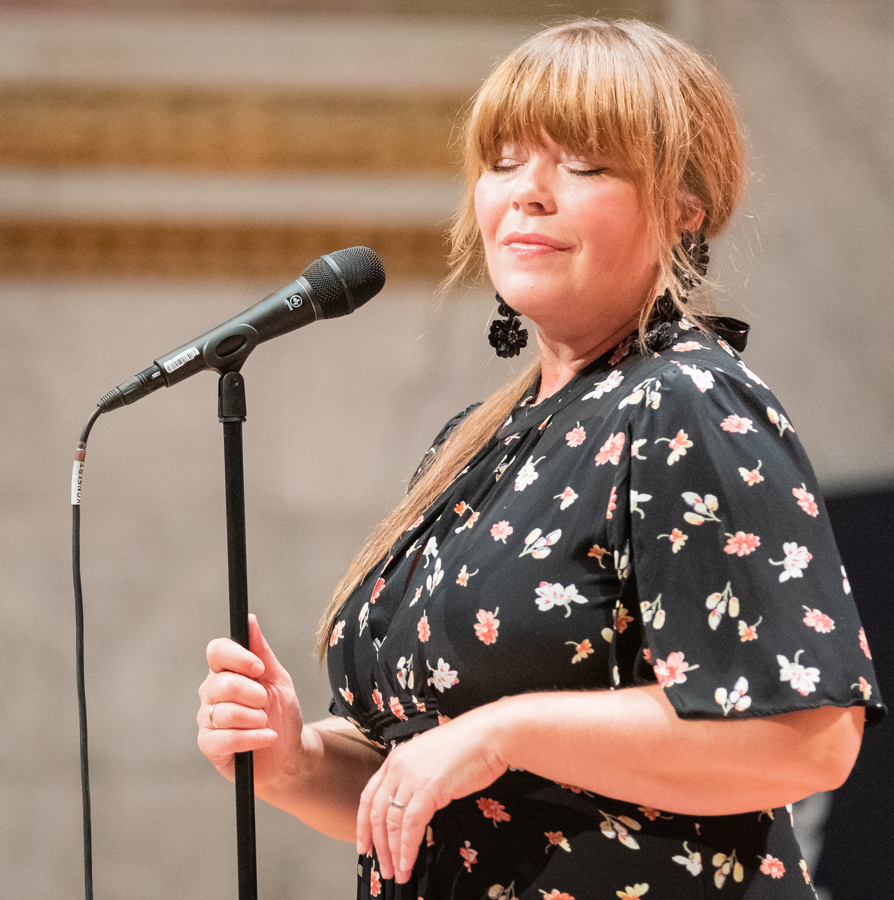
- Slettahjell at the Oslo Jazzfestival 2018

Background information
- Born: 2 April 1971 (age 55); Bærum, Akershus
- Origin: Norway
- Genres: Jazz
- Occupations: Musician, composer
- Instrument: Vocals
- Labels: Curling Legs, ACT, Universal
- Website: www.solveigslettahjell.no

Solveig Slettahjell (born 2 April 1971) is a Norwegian jazz singer, known for her soulful, seductive voice.

== Career ==
Slettahjell was born in Bærum, Norway, and made her recording debut with the album Slow Motion Orchestra (2003), which contains jazz standards like "All the Way" and "My Heart Belongs to Daddy". It was released after festival appearance at Nattjazz 2002. For her second album, Silver (2004), her band took the name "Slow Motion Quintet". In 2005, they released Pixiedust.

After working with a commission for Vossajazz Festiva (2009), she released the music on the acclaimed album Tarpan Seasons (2010). In 2012 she performed at the Oslo Jazz Festival with Gregory Porter.

Slettahjell collaborated with Tord Gustavsen and Sjur Miljeteig releasing the albums Natt I Betlehem (2008) and Arven (2013) including with Nils Økland. In 2011 she released the album Antologie with Morten Qvenild and in 2015 the album Trail of Souls with Knut Reiersrud and the jazz ensemble In the Country. The album was praised for Slettahjell’s "immensely soulful vocals".

== Honors ==
- 2004: Spellemannprisen in the class Jazz
- 2005: Radka Toneff Memorial Award
- 2005: Kongsberg Jazz Award
- 2011: Gammleng-prisen in the class Jazz

== Discography ==
=== As leader ===
Year	Personnel	Album	Label	Peak positions
Year	Personnel	Album	Label	NOR
2001	Solveig Slettahjell	Slow Motion Orchestra	Curling Legs	–
2004	Solveig Slettahjell Slow Motion Quintet	Silver	Curling Legs	23
2005	Solveig Slettahjell Slow Motion Quintet	Pixiedust	Curling Legs	25
2006	Solveig Slettahjell Slow Motion Quintet	Good Rain	Curling Legs (, ACT)	28
2007	Solveig Slettahjell Slow Motion Quintet	Domestic Songs	Curling Legs (, ACT)	30
2008	Solveig Slettahjell with Tord Gustavsen and Sjur Miljeteig	Natt I Betlehem	Kirkelig Kulturverksted	5
2009	Solveig Slettahjell Slow Motion Orchestra	Tarpan Seasons	Universal	5
2011	Solveig Slettahjell (with Morten Qvenild)	Antologie	Universal	6
2013	Solveig Slettahjell (with Tord Gustavsen, Sjur Miljeteig and Nils Økland)	Arven	Universal	5
2015	Solveig Slettahjell and Knut Reiersrud with In the Country	Trail of Souls	ACT	-

=== With others ===
- 1998: Squid – Super (Forward)
- 1999: Kvitretten – Everything Turns (Curling Legs)
- 2002: Kvitretten – Kloden er en snurrebass som snurrer oss (Curling Legs)
- 2002: Sigvart Dagsland – Underlig Frihet (Kirkelig Kulturverksted), as guest vocalist on one track
- 2005: Jon Balke Batagraf – Statements (ECM)
- 2006: Friko – The Journey to Mandoola (C+C)
- 2014: Bugge Wesseltoft, Knut Reiersrud and In The Country – Norwegian Woods – Jazz at Berlin Philharmonic II (ACT)

Awards
Preceded by Atomic	Recipient of the Jazz Spellemannprisen; 2004	Succeeded by Hans Mathisen
Preceded by Live Maria Roggen	Recipient of the Radka Toneff Memorial Award; 2005	Succeeded by Arve Henriksen
Preceded by Ingebrigt Håker Flaten	Recipient of the Kongsberg Jazz Award; 2005	Succeeded by Håvard Wiik
Preceded by No Jazz award	Recipient of the Jazz Gammleng-prisen; 2011	Succeeded by Eldbjørg Raknes
