= Grindstone (album) =

Studio album by Shining
- Released: 29 January 2007
- Genres: Avant-garde, experimental rock, jazz fusion, hard rock, jazz-metal
- Length: 44:08
- Label: Rune Grammofon
- Producer: Kåre Chr. Vestrheim

Shining chronology
In The Kingdom Of Kitsch You Will Be A Monster (2005)	Grindstone (2007)	Blackjazz (2010)

Professional ratings
Review scores
Source	Rating
AllMusic	4/5 stars
Pitchfork	7.6/10
Sonic Frontiers	9/10
Stylus Magazine	B

Grindstone is the fourth studio album by the Norwegian band Shining, released in 2007 by Rune Grammofon.

== Track listing ==
All music is composed by Jørgen Munkeby, except where noted.

No.	Title	Music	Length
1.	"In the Kingdom of Kitsch You Will Be a Monster"		5:40
2.	"Winterreise"		3:33
3.	"Stalemate Longan Runner"	Andreas Hessen Schei	4:15
4.	"To Be Proud of Crystal Colors is to Live Again"		0:50
5.	"Moonchild Mindgames"		3:06
6.	"The Red Room"		2:16
7.	"ASA NISI MASA"		1:52
8.	"To Be Proud of Crystal Colors is to Live Again"		1:10
9.	"Psalm"		7:21
10.	"-... .- -.-. ...."		2:07
11.	"1:4:9"		5:04
12.	"Fight Dusk with Dawn"		6:54
Total length:			44:08

== Notes ==
- The title of track 10, "-... .- -.-. ...." spells out 'Bach' in morse code.
- The title of track 11, "1:4:9" is the proportions of the black monolith from the film 2001: A Space Odyssey.
- "Asa Nisi Masa" is a gibberish phrase found in the film 8½. As a child, the main character Guido Anselmi is told by a fellow orphan that uttering this phrase at night will bring to life a certain portrait, and reveal a secret treasure hidden within the orphanage.
- "In the Kingdom of Kitsch You Will Be a Monster" is a reference to the novel The Unbearable Lightness of Being and is also the title of Shining's previous record.

== Personnel ==
=== Shining ===
- Jørgen Munkeby – saxophone, flute, clarinet, guitars, vocals
- Andreas Hessen Schei – keyboards, synthesizer
- Morten Strøm – bass guitar
- Torstein Lofthus – drums

=== Additional personnel ===
- Danny Young – gong (track 1, 3, 12)
- Kristoffer Myre Eng – organ (track 9)
- Åshild Skiri Refsdal – vocals (track 9, 11)
- Kåre Chr. Vestrheim – production, mixing
- Hasse Rosbach – mixing, editing
- Mike Hartung – mixing
- Kim Hiorthøy – cover art
