= Shining (Norwegian band) =

Norwegian band

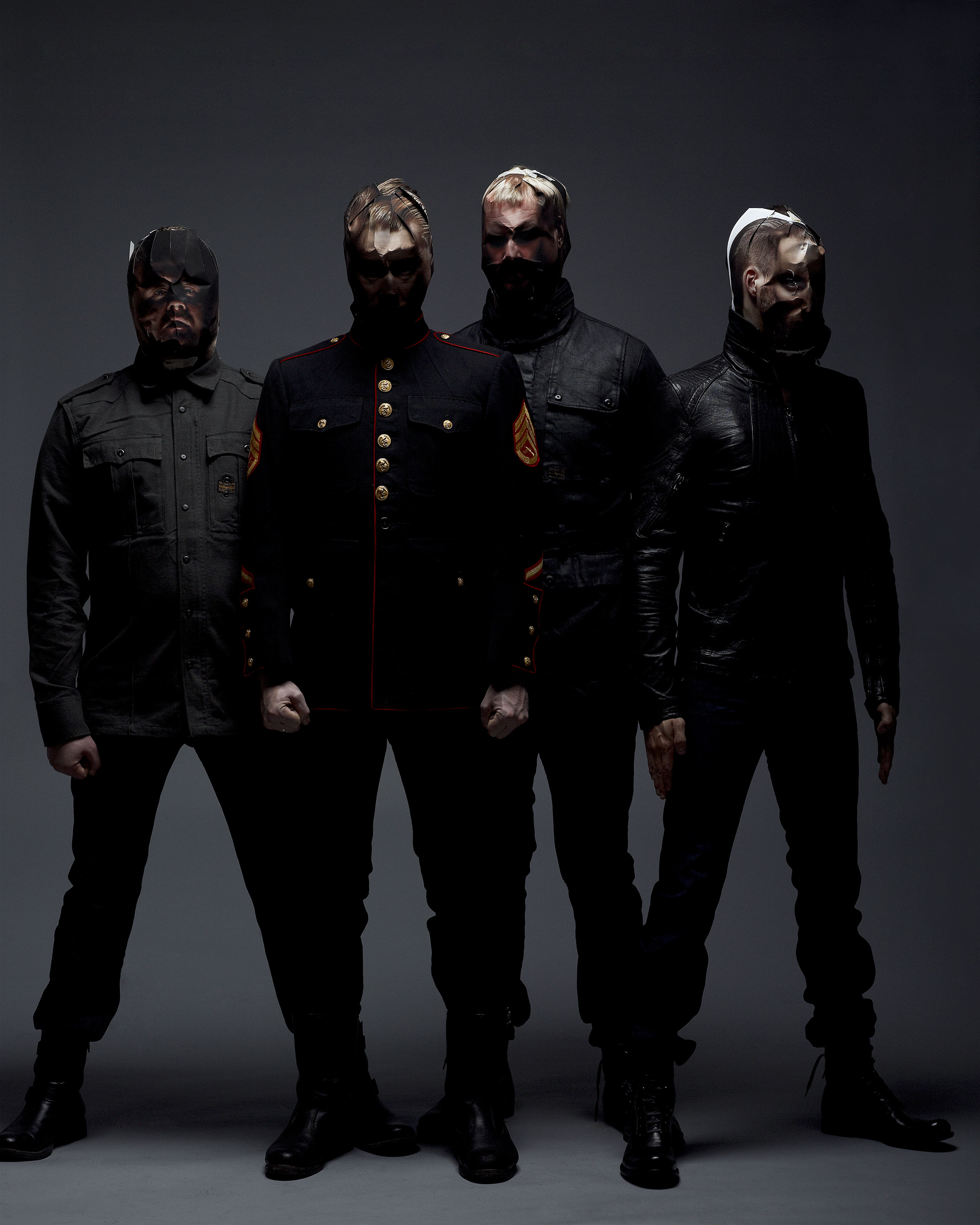
- From left: Torstein Lofthus, Tor Egil Kreken, Bernt Moen, Jørgen Munkeby (2009)

Background information
- Origin: Oslo, Norway
- Genres: Avant-garde metal; progressive rock; experimental rock; jazz fusion; free jazz
- Years active: 1999–present
- Labels: BP, Jazzland, Rune Grammofon, Indie, Spinefarm
- Members: Jørgen Munkeby; Ole Vistnes; Simen Sandnes
- Past members: See below
- Website: shining.no

Shining (stylized as SHINING) is a Norwegian experimental band from Oslo. Thirteen musicians have been a part of the band's lineup in its history, with singer, guitarist, saxophonist, and songwriter Jørgen Munkeby as its leading force and only constant member. The band is also called SHINING (NOR) to avoid confusion with the Swedish black metal band of the same name.

Shining was created in 1999 as an acoustic instrumental jazz quartet consisting of Munkeby, drummer Torstein Lofthus, pianist Morten Qvenild, and double bassist Aslak Hartberg. They released their first albums Where the Ragged People Go and Sweet Shanghai Devil in 2001 and 2003 respectively. Their 2005 album In the Kingdom of Kitsch You Will Be a Monster led the band into a more avant-garde, electric, and rock-oriented sound, with Qvenild playing synthesizers and other electronic keyboards and Hartberg mostly using bass guitar instead of double bass.

Qvenild and Hartberg both left the band before or following the release of the album, being replaced in 2005 by Andreas Hessen Schei and Morten Strøm respectively. Under this line-up, Shining released Grindstone in 2007, an album going into a heavier direction and distancing itself more from jazz, incorporating elements from progressive rock, pop, and 19th and 20th-century classical music. During the following years, Schei was replaced by Andreas Ulvo who was himself replaced by Bernt Moen, while Tor Egil Kreken replaced Strøm on bass guitar. The band included guitarist Even Helte Hermansen as a new member in 2010, expanding into a quintet.

On their fifth album Blackjazz (2010) Shining became an extreme avant-garde metal band with the use of growled vocals from Munkeby. During the same year, Hermansen was replaced by Sagen. Their first live album Live Blackjazz and sixth studio, One One One, released in 2013, follow the musical direction begun in Blackjazz. In the following years, Lofthus (the only original member left aside from Munkeby), Løchsen, and Kreken all left the band. The two first were replaced by Tobias Ørnes Andersen and Eirik Tovsrud Knutsen respectively, while Ole Vistnes became the bassist. Their studio album International Blackjazz Society was released in 2015.

Shining's metal-oriented albums were received with much acclaim from both jazz, heavy metal, and more mainstream critics.

== History ==
=== Acoustic albums (1999–2005) ===
Shining was formed in 1999 by saxophonist and multi-instrumentalist Jørgen Munkeby. Munkeby had moved to Oslo to study at the Norwegian Academy of Music, and was in need of a band for a concert he had already booked. Knowing no one, he looked for bandmates among his fellow students. There he found bassist Aslak Hartberg, drummer Torstein Lofthus and pianist Morten Qvenild.

Their first album, Where the Ragged People Go, was released 5 November 2001. At a time when the young Norwegian jazz scene was dominated by future jazz, as pioneered by Bugge Wesseltoft and Nils Petter Molvær, Shining received a lot of attention by playing modern and energetic acoustic jazz. Their music especially contrasted that of Jaga Jazzist, a band of which Jørgen Munkeby had been a member since 1994.

The band's John Coltrane and Ornette Coleman-inspired sound was further developed on their second album, Sweet Shanghai Devil, released by Jazzland Recordings in 2003. Their music became freer, incorporating more elements from outside the jazz idiom, but remained entirely acoustic.

=== On Rune Grammofon (2005–2007) ===
2005 saw a complete transformation of Shining's music with the release of their third album, In the Kingdom of Kitsch You Will Be a Monster, where progressive rock and metal were blended in with the experimental jazz heard on Sweet Shanghai Devil. Munkeby's woodwind instruments were accompanied by the Akai EWI, electric guitars and synthesizers, and Aslak Hartberg's double bass was largely replaced by electric bass. Drum machines were also used on the album, as well as a wide range of less common instruments such as the accordion, harmonium, church organ, clavinet and celesta.

Shining had now signed with Rune Grammofon, a record label that specializes in experimental and improvised music. They had also developed a new approach to recording albums. Whereas their previous albums were all recorded with the whole band in front of a couple of microphones, they now recorded parts of songs at different locations. Working with producer Kåre Christoffer Vestrheim, these parts were then mixed together in the studio.

Munkeby has stated that Motorpsycho was the main inspiration to move to a more rock-centric sound, and that the album was strongly influenced by Olivier Messiaen. The move proved to be successful. In the Kingdom of Kitsch You Will Be a Monster was well received by critics, both in Norway and internationally, and was included in the best new music section on Pitchfork. It would also go on to win the Alarm Award for best jazz album in 2006.

Pianist Morten Qvenild Left Shining between the album's recording and release. Replacing him was Andreas Hessen Schei. Bassist Aslak Hartberg would later be replaced by Morten Strøm for their fourth album, Grindstone.

On Grindstone, released on Rune Grammofon January 2007, Shining refined the style developed on In the Kingdom of Kitsch. The compositions were tighter and on a whole the music was harder, although the album featured several softer tracks as well. Apart from metal, classical influences were displayed more overtly and elements of noise and drone were introduced. As its predecessor the year before, Grindstone won the Alarm Award for best jazz album in 2007.

=== Armageddon concerto (2007–2010) ===
In October 2007 Shining toured Europe as support for the progressive black metal band Enslaved. The concerts usually ended with the two bands doing a cover version of King Crimson's 21st Century Schizoid Man. After seeing a video of one of these covers, the programme committee of Moldejazz commissioned the two bands to write and perform a 90-minute work together.

The resulting work Nine Nights in Nothingness – Glimpses of Downfall, often referred to as The Armageddon Concerto, was first performed at Moldejazz 19 July 2008. The concerto consists of nine movements, five of which were composed by Jørgen Munkeby and four by Ivar Bjørnson of Enslaved.

Inspired by Norse mythology, doomsday cults, and science fiction, the music describes the end of the world, a following post-apocalyptic environment and finally a new beginning. Musically the different movements draw inspiration form a wide range of sources, most notably György Ligeti, Olivier Messiaen, and John Coltrane, but also Sunn O))) and The Beatles.

As the first performance of The Armageddon Concerto since Moldejazz 2008, Enslaved and Shining were the main headliners at the 2010 Roadburn Festival, where Enslaved were the artist in residence.

=== Heavy metal (2010–2017) ===
Shining's fifth album Blackjazz was released 18 January 2010 on Indie Recordings. The album's title is meant to describe Shining's sound, which on Blackjazz became even harder and more intense than ever before.

The instrumentation was also far simpler than on the two previous albums, with Jørgen Munkeby focusing on guitars and saxophone. This has made the album's sound closer to how they sound live, as songs from previous albums needed to be simplified for live performances.

According to Munkeby, a big inspiration in the development of the Blackjazz genre, was his work with In Lingua Mortua in 2006/2007. To quote Munkeby: "Lars' refreshing blend of an impressive intellectual display and direct raw power has been a big inspiration for me. Lars is a true pioneer. He was the first person to invite me to play sax in a black metal setting, and in so doing, contributed strongly to SHINING's later development of the Blackjazz genre."

Shining's collaboration with Enslaved is also a clear influence on Blackjazz. The album's first single, Fisheye, is a newer version of the seventh movement of The Armageddon Concerto, and the vinyl edition of Blackjazz includes a studio version of the concerto's first movement as a bonus track. Blackjazz ends with a cover version of "21st Century Schizoid Man", featuring guest vocals by Enslaved's Grutle Kjellson.

The band's releases since Blackjazz have continued in a similar style, albeit often with more concise songs. Live Blackjazz contains material from In the Kingdom of Kitsch You Will Be a Monster, Grindstone, and Blackjazz performed in the style of the band's then-most-recent album. One One One continues the industrial metal/jazz hybrid of Blackjazz, but with much shorter songs and less avant-garde influences; none of the album's nine songs reaches the five-minute mark. International Blackjazz Society continues in the same vein, but the songs are somewhat longer, and many of them are linked continuously. The band's recent metal works have continued to receive critical acclaim from jazz, metal, and mainstream publications.

=== Animal (2017–present) ===
A new single released on 11 September 2017, titled "Everything Dies", saw the band abandoning the jazz elements of their previous albums. The single "Animal", released on 10 August 2018, followed the same musical direction; both titles are present on their album Animal, released on 19 October 2018.

== Members ==
Current members

- Jørgen Munkeby – saxophone (1999–present), flute, clarinet (1999–2007), guitar (2002–present), vocals (2004–present)
- Ole Vistnes - bass guitar (2015–present)
- Simen Sandnes – drums (2020–present)

Former members

- Morten Qvenild – piano (1999–2004), keyboards, synthesizers (2004)
- Aslak Hartberg – double bass (1999–2005), bass guitar (2004–2005)
- Andreas Hessen Schei – keyboards, synthesizers (2005–2006)
- Morten Strøm – bass guitar (2005–2008)
- Andreas Ulvo – keyboards, synthesizers (2007–2008)
- Even Helte Hermansen – guitar (2007–2010)
- Bernt Moen – keyboards, synthesizers (2008–2012)
- Torstein Lofthus – drums (1999–2014)
- Knut Løchsen – keyboards, synthesizers (2012–2014)
- Tor Egil Kreken – bass guitar (2008–2015)
- Tobias Ørnes Andersen – drums (2014–2019)
- Håkon Sagen – guitar (2010–2019)
- Eirik Tovsrud Knutsen – keyboards, synthesizer (2014–2019)

== Discography ==
=== Studio albums ===
Year	Album	Peak positions	Certification
Year	Album	NOR	Certification
2001	Where the Ragged People Go	–	
2003	Sweet Shanghai Devil	–	
2005	In the Kingdom of Kitsch You Will Be a Monster	–	
2007	Grindstone	19	
2010	Blackjazz	9	
2013	One One One	15	
2015	International Blackjazz Society	–	
2018	Animal	–	

=== Live albums ===
- Live Blackjazz (2011)

== Other works ==
- Nine Nights in Nothingness – Glimpses of Downfall (2008)

A 90-minute Armegeddon Concerto composed and performed with Enslaved, commissioned by Moldejazz

== Awards ==
- 2006: Winner of the Alarm award, album In the Kingdom of Kitsch You Will Be a Monster
- 2007: Winner of the Alarm award, album Grindstone
- 2007: Nominated for Spellemannsprisen, album Grindstone
- 2007: Nominated for StatoilHydro talent scholarship at by:Larm, album Grindstone
- 2010: Received the A-ha scholarship
- 2011: Won the Spellemannsprisen, album Blackjazz
- 2013: Received the Statoil scholarship
