= Gustav Ejstes =

Swedish musician

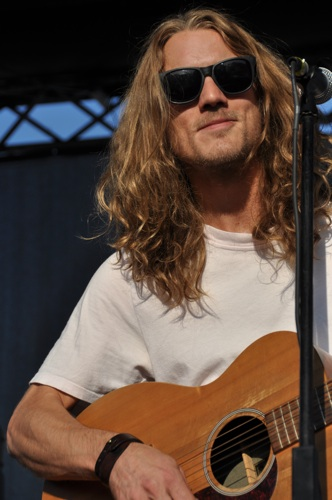
- Ejstes live in Concert with Dungen in 2009

Background information
- Origin: Sweden
- Genres: Alternative rock, psychedelic rock, progressive rock
- Years active: Since 1999

Gustav Ejstes (born 23 December 1979) is a Swedish musician. He is the singer and frontman of the Swedish psychedelic rock band Dungen. Ejstes himselfs plays many of the instruments within his recordings, alongside bandmates Reine Fiske (guitar), Mattias "Tiaz" Gustavsson (bass) and Johan Holmegard (drums).

Subliminal Sounds is the record label to which Ejstes returned after a short period with Virgin Records and the record "Stadsvandringar". He has released seven albums with Dungen, notably their album Ta Det Lugnt (2004), which has been highly acclaimed all over the world. Other works include, Tio Bitar (2007), 4 (2008) and Skit i allt (2010).

Ejstes is also a member of a band called Amason, together with Idiot Wind (Amanda Bergman Mattson), Pontus Winnberg, Nils Törnqvist and Petter Winnberg.

He played the flute for Australian rock band Wolfmother's song "Witchcraft" on their live DVD Please Experience Wolfmother Live. He also played the flute on the track called "Nattmusik" with Swedish hip hop band Fattaru released in 2003.

== Discography ==
=== Albums ===
- Dungen (2001)
- Dungen 2 (2002)
- Stadsvandringar (2002)
- Ta Det Lugnt (2004)
- Tio Bitar (2007)
- 4 (2008)
- Skit i allt (2010)
- "Allas Sak" (2015)
- "Häxan" (2016)
- "Dungen Live" (2020)
- "En Är För Mycket och Tusen Aldrig Nog" (2022)

=== EPs ===
- Tyst Minut (2005, Subliminal Sounds) (12" vinyl, also included with 2005 re-release of Ta Det Lugnt)
- Samtidigt (2009, Kemado) (limited-pressing (500) tour-only 12″ vinyl containing an extended 15-minute-long version of the song "Samtidigt" from 4)

=== Singles ===
- Solen Stiger Upp (2002, Dolores Recordings) (CD)
- Stadsvandringar (2002, Dolores Recordings) (CD)
- Jag vill va' som du / Har du vart' i Stockholm? (2003, Dolores Recordings) (CD)
- Panda (2005, Memphis Industries) (CD, 7" vinyl)
- Festival (2006, Memphis Industries) (7" vinyl)
- Sätt Att Se (2008, Mexican Summer) (12" vinyl)
- Öga, Näsa, Mun (2011, Third Man Records) (7" vinyl)

=== Compilations ===
- Who Will Buy These Wonderful Evils (2002, Dolores Recordings)
