= Dungen 2 =

Studio album by Dungen
- Released: 2002
- Genre: Psychedelic rock, progg
- Length: 38:50
- Label: Subliminal Sounds

Dungen chronology
Dungen (2001)	Dungen 2 (2002)	Stadsvandringar (2002)

Dungen 2 is the vinyl version of Swedish psychedelic rock group Dungen's album Stadsvandringar.

It was released by Subliminal Sounds in 2002 in a limited edition of 500 copies. The CD version, Stadsvandringar, was released that year on Dolores Recordings and contained some alternate tracks: "Ät Det Som Växer" was replaced by "Stadsvandring Del 2" and "Andra Sidan Sjön".

== Track listing ==
Side one
No.	Title	English translation	Length
1.	"Stadsvandringar"	City Walks	3:14
2.	"Har Du Vart’ I Stockholm?"	Have You Been To Stockholm?	3:42
3.	"Solen Stiger Upp"	The Sun Rises	4:06
4.	"Stock Och Sten"	Wood And Stone	3:26
5.	"Sol Och Regn"	Sun And Rain	4:19
Total length:			18:47

Side two
No.	Title	English translation	Length
1.	"Fest"	Party	3:37
2.	"Natten Blir Dag"	The Night Turns Into Day	3:06
3.	"Ät Det Som Växer"	Eat What Grows	5:40
4.	"Vem Vaktar Lejonen?"	Who Guards The Lions?	3:39
5.	"Krona"	Crown	4:01
Total length:			20:03 38:50

== Personnel ==
- Gustav Ejstes – vocals, guitars, bass, drums, keyboards, flutes, violin
- Reine Fiske – guitars, bass, percussion
- Henrik Nilsson – bass
- Marko Lohikari – bass
- Fredrik Björling – drums, percussion
- Alex Wiig – sitar, percussion
