= Motorpsycho (album) =

Studio album by Motorpsycho
- Released: 21 February 2025
- Studio: The Cheese Factory Kommun', Amper Stone Studio
- Genre: Psychedelic rock, progressive rock, alternative rock
- Length: 81:39
- Label: Det Nordenfjeldske Grammofonselskab
- Producer: Motorpsycho, Deathprod

Motorpsycho chronology
Neigh!! (2024)	Motorpsycho (2025)	Ahsol Caravan (2025)

Professional ratings
Review scores
Source	Rating
Sputnikmusic	4.1/5 stars
Prog Archives	4.29/5 stars

Motorpsycho is a studio album by Norwegian rock band Motorpsycho, released on 21 February 2025, through Det Nordenfjeldske Grammofonselskab. The eponymously titled album is available in CD, vinyl (double album) and digital download formats.

Upon the announcement of the album, the band stated that it has now officially been downsized to a two-piece group that will be joined by guest musicians.

== Musical style ==
Unlike its COVID-19 pandemic-era predecessors Yay! and Neigh!!, which were rather folksy, the album has more similarities with the so-called Gullvåg trilogy (The Tower, The Crucible and The All Is One) and leans more strongly towards alternative rock and progressive rock. As always, however, there are musical experiments, including an Erik Satie-inspired piano instrumental, and forays into pop-oriented rock and 1970s blues rock.

== Reception ==
Reviews were generally more favorable than the two previous "Covid" albums. Sputnikmusic gave the album a 4.1 ("excellent") rating, while Prog Archives gave it an aggregated 4.21 ("excellent addition to any prog rock music collection") score, saying "honestly this record feels like a manifesto of all their great moments bundled into one package".

According to Echoes & Dust, "From prog, cabaret, krautrock, pop-orientated, alternative rock, freak-out sessions, and psychedelic adventures, the band have gone back through the adventures once more to prove themselves that they can kick plenty of asses with mesmerising punches that come out of the blue."

Maxazine gave the album an 8 out of 10 score, saying: "With this release Motorpsycho proves, 36 years after their debut, they are still able to explore new horizons. An 8/10 for a band that refuses to come to a standstill, always on the road to new frontiers."

Plattentests.de also gave the album an 8/10 rating, writing: "Motorpsycho have resolutely wiped off the table any doubts about their creativity. In their fourth decade the Norwegians have definitely become an institution. (...) The current album with its occasional trips into their own past is a delightful invitation to that history."

== Track listing ==
No.	Title	Writer(s)	Length
1.	"Lucifer, Bringer of Light"	Bent Sæther	10:49
2.	"Laird of Heimly"	Sæther	3:54
3.	"Stanley (Tonight's the Night)"	Sæther	4:10
4.	"The Comeback"	Sæther	4:32
5.	"Kip Satie"	Hans Magnus Ryan	2:25
6.	"Balthazaar"	Sæther, Ryan	11:40
7.	"Bed of Roses"	Sæther	3:19
8.	"Neotzar (The Second Coming)"	Sæther, Ryan	21:07
9.	"Core Memory Corrupt"	Sæther	5:38
10.	"Three Frightened Monkeys"	Sæther	8:41
11.	"Dead of Winter"	Sæther	5:24
Total length:			81:39

== Personnel ==
Motorpsycho

- Bent Sæther – lead vocals, background vocals, violin, organ, electric guitar, acoustic guitar (6 and 12 string), rhythm guitar, bass guitar, percussion, synthesizer, mellotron, electric piano, omnichord
- Hans Magnus Ryan – lead vocals, background vocals, lead guitar, rhythm guitar, mellotron, electric guitar, piano, synthesizer, slide guitar

With

- Ingvald Vassbø – drums (on #1, #6, #8, #9, #10 and #11)
- Mari Persen - strings (on #2)
- Reine Fiske - electric guitar (on #3 and #4)
- Olaf Olsen - drums (on #3 and #4)
- Thea Grant - vocals (on #8)
