= Ta det lugnt =

Ta Det Lugnt

Studio album by Dungen
- Released: 21 June 2004
- Recorded: Konst & Ramar and Bergströmska Institutet, Stockholm
- Genre: Acid rock; psychedelic pop; krautrock; psychedelic rock
- Length: 53:17; 14:03 (bonus disc)
- Label: Subliminal Sounds
- Producer: Gustav Ejstes

Dungen chronology
Stadsvandringar (2002)	Ta Det Lugnt (2004)	Tio bitar (2007)

Singles from Ta det lugnt
- 1. "Panda" Released: 12 September 2005; 2. "Festival" Released: 22 May 2006

Ta det lugnt ("Take It Easy") is the third album by the Swedish psychedelic rock group Dungen. It was produced by Gustav Ejstes, the lead singer and instrumentalist of the band. Ejstes also recorded and mixed the album. Ta det lugnt was originally released on 21 June 2004 by Subliminal Sounds in Sweden, then re-issued in the United States with the mostly instrumental 5-song EP Tyst minut as a bonus disc in August 2005 by Kemado Records, then released in the United Kingdom by Memphis Industries in January 2006.

== Critical reception ==
Professional ratings
Aggregate scores
Source	Rating
Metacritic	88/100
Review scores
Source	Rating
AllMusic	4.5/5 stars
The Austin Chronicle	4/5 stars
Blender	3/5 stars
Collective	4.5/5
Entertainment Weekly	B+
NME	8/10
The Observer	4/5 stars
Pitchfork	9.3/10
Spin	A−
Uncut	4/5 stars

Ta det lugnt received critical acclaim, scoring 88 on Metacritic and making it the website's tenth best album in 2004. In March 2009, it was the 43rd best album overall.

== Track listing ==
No.	Title	English translation	Length
1.	"Panda"		4:55
2.	"Gjort bort sig"	Made a Fool of One's Self	5:10
3.	"Festival"		3:43
4.	"Du e för fin för mig"	You're Too Good for Me	8:28
5.	"Ta det lugnt"	Take It Easy	7:43
6.	"Det du tänker idag är du i morgon"	What You Think Today You'll Be Tomorrow	3:58
7.	"Lejonet & Kulan"	The Lion & the Den	2:48
8.	"Bortglömd"	Forgotten/Neglected	4:27
9.	"Glömd konst kommer stundom ånyo till heders"	Forgotten Art Is Sometimes Appreciated Again	0:55
10.	"Lipsill"	Crybaby	2:45
11.	"Om du vore en vakthund"	If You Were a Watchdog	3:02
12.	"Tack ska ni ha"	Thank You/You Have My Thanks	0:31
13.	"Sluta följa efter"	Stop Following	4:52
Total length:			53:17

=== Tyst Minut EP ===
The following tracks, released as the Tyst Minut EP, were included with the 2005 U.S. release of this album:

Tyst Minut EP
No.	Title	English translation	Length
1.	"Tyst minut"	Moment of Silence [Literally “Quiet Minute”]	3:47
2.	"Jämna plågor"	Regular Pain	3:07
3.	"Sjutton"	Seventeen	2:50
4.	"Christopher"		2:01
5.	"Badsång"	Bath Song	2:18
Total length:			14:03

== Personnel ==
- Gustav Ejstes - lyrics, music, vocals, guitar, bass guitar, drums, keyboards, fiddle, flute
- Reine Fiske - electric guitar on tracks 1–5, 7, 8, 10, 11, and 13, bass guitar on tracks 5, 8, and 13, percussion on track 10
- Fredrik Björling - drums on tracks 1 and 3, percussion on track 8
- Henrik Nilsson - bass guitar on tracks 1 and 3
- Aron Hejdström - saxophone on track 5
- Lars-Olof Ejstes - fiddle on tracks 4 and 10
- Anna Karin Palm - vocals on track 12
- Tiaz Gustavsson - percussion on track 10
- Frew Elfineh Taha - voice on track 5

== Production ==
- Producer: Gustav Ejstes
- Executive producer: Stefan Kéry
- Mixing: Gustav Ejstes
- Recording: Gustav Ejstes
- Engineering: Pierre Carnbrand
- Mastering: Thomas Tibert
- Cover design: Stefan Kéry and Carl Abrahamsson
- Photography: Stefan Kéry and Ida Lauden
- Publishing: Sony ATV Music Publishing Scandinavia
