= Motorpsycho =

Motorpsycho may refer to:

- Motorpsycho (band), a Norwegian rock band
  - Motorpsycho (album)
- Motorpsycho (film), a 1965 film by Russ Meyer
- Motorpsychos, an American rock band
- Motor Psycho, a 1990 video game

== See also ==
- Motorpsycho Presents The International Tussler Society, a 2004 album by the International Tussler Society
- "Motorpsycho Nitemare", a 1964 song by Bob Dylan
- "Moto Psycho", a song on the 2001 album The World Needs a Hero by Megadeth
