= The Amazing =

Swedish indie rock band

- Origin: Sweden
- Genres: Indie rock; psychedelic rock; neo-psychedelia; progressive rock; jazz rock; progg
- Labels: Subliminal Sounds; Partisan (WW); Dine Alone (CA)
- Members: Reine Fiske; Christoffer Gunrup; Fredrik Swahn; Alexis Benson; Moussa Fadera

The Amazing are a Swedish indie rock band, whose members include Reine Fiske, who plays with Dungen, and Christoffer Gunrup, who played in Granada and with Anna Järvinen. Fredrik Swahn, Alexis Benson, and drummer Moussa Fadera are also in The Amazing.

== History ==
=== Self-titled debut (2009-2010) ===
The Amazing released their self-titled debut on April 29, 2009, on Subliminal Sounds. The disc was reviewed by the Dagens Nyheter, and others including Sydsvenskan, and the Swedish morning broadsheet Svenska Dagbladet. In connection with the first disc, the group played on the program P3 Pop on Swedish Radio P3.

=== Gentle Stream (2011-present) ===
Gentle Stream was released in 2011. The Amazing did a Daytrotter session on December 5, 2012. They played, "Gone" from the album on Late Night with David Letterman on January 18, 2013. The Amazing appeared on World Cafe on February 6, 2013.

Their fourth album, Picture You, was released on February 17, 2015. Allmusic noted that it "is the culmination of all their work, with a combination of wonderfully rich arrangements, inspired playing and singing, and a batch of lengthy songs that both warm the heart and expand the mind".

== Discography ==
=== Albums ===
- The Amazing (2009)
- Wait for a Light to Come EP (2010)
- Gentle Stream (2011)
- Picture You (2015)
- Ambulance (2016)
- In Transit (2018)
- Piggies (2024)
