= Skit i allt =

Studio album by Dungen
- Released: August 30, 2010 (Sweden); September 14, 2010 (U.S.)
- Genre: Psychedelic rock, progg
- Length: 34:21
- Label: Subliminal Sounds (SE); Mexican Summer (US)

Dungen chronology
4 (2008)	Skit i allt (2010)	Allas Sak (2015)

Professional ratings
Aggregate scores
Source	Rating
Metacritic	75/100
Review scores
Source	Rating
AllMusic	4/5 stars
Gigwise	8/10 stars
Pitchfork Media	6.8/10
Spin	8/10 stars

Skit i allt is the sixth album by the Swedish psychedelic rock group Dungen. The title literally means "Screw it all" in Swedish.

It was released as a CD and a limited edition red vinyl (1,200 copies only) on August 30, 2010, by Subliminal Sounds in Sweden. The album was released in the US on the Mexican Summer imprint of Kemado Records on September 14, 2010.

== Track listing ==
All tracks are written by Gustav Ejstes.

No.	Title	English translation	Length
1.	"Vara snabb"	Being Fast	3:09
2.	"Min enda vän"	My Only Friend	3:15
3.	"Brallor"	Pants	3:14
4.	"Soda"		3:38
5.	"Högdalstoppen"		4:43
6.	"Skit i allt"	Screw It All	2:59
7.	"Barnen undrar"	The Children Are Wondering	3:21
8.	"Blandband"	Mixtape	3:49
9.	"Nästa sommar"	Next Summer	3:19
10.	"Marken låg stilla"	The Ground Lay Still	2:54
Total length:			34:21

== Personnel ==
- Gustav Ejstes – flute, guitar, piano, strings, zither, vocals, bass guitar on 2 and 8, drums on 2, producer, engineer
- Reine Fiske – bass guitar, guitar
- Mattias Gustafsson – bass guitar on 5 and 9
- Johan Holmegard – drums
- Anna Järvinen – vocals on 3
- Magnus Josefsson - recording assistant
- Stefan Kéry – executive producer
- Jenny Palén - cover design, photos
- Håkan Åkesson – mastering
- Nicole Atkins, Mattias Gustafsson, Stefan Kéry, Chris Newmyer and Love Palén Åkerlund – additional photos
