= 27 Songs from Barcelona =

27 Songs From Barcelona

Studio album by I'm from Barcelona
- Released: 27 January 2010
- Genres: Indie pop; baroque pop; folk rock; pop rock; indie rock
- Label: Dolores

I'm from Barcelona chronology
| Who Killed Harry Houdini? (2008) | 27 Songs From Barcelona (2010) | Forever Today (2011) |

27 Songs From Barcelona is the third album from the Swedish band I'm from Barcelona. While touring around the world with their two latest releases Let Me Introduce My Friends (2006) and Who Killed Harry Houdini (2008), the members of I'm from Barcelona compiled the songs for 27 Songs from Barcelona.

Inspired by Kiss' simultaneous release of four solo albums in 1978, 27 Songs from Barcelona features one solo song for every of the 27 members of I'm from Barcelona.

In preparation, a daily release was made online, a song per day, made available through the band's official website, to prepare for the eventual launch.

The album was released on vinyl in a limited edition and in a set of 3 records. The album was also made available on their website free to stream and for downloads.

== Track listing ==
| No. | Title | Performer | Length |
|---|---|---|---|
| 1. | "Lower My Head" | Daniel Lindlöf |
| 2. | "But Hey Even Though Your Horses Went Away" | Anna Fröderberg |
| 3. | "Baby Let's Go" | Tina Gardestrand |
| 4. | "Silence" | David Ljung |
| 5. | "The Return of the Ape" | Mathias Alriksson |
| 6. | "What Should I Do" | Johan Mårtensson |
| 7. | "Pet Duet" | Cornelia Norgren |
| 8. | "Nothin Like the Mornin'" | Rikard Ljung |
| 9. | "Make Me a Cowboy Again for a Day" | Henrik Olofsson |
| 10. | "Be the Same" | Mattias Johansson |
| 11. | "Tour de France" | Marcus Carlholt |
| 12. | "Hej Hej Ivar" | Emma Öhnell |
| 13. | "Zapatista" | Erik Ottosson |
| 14. | "Best Days Are To Come" | Johan Aineland |
| 15. | "Morning Again" | Frida Öhnell |
| 16. | "Göteborg" | Jonas Tjäder |
| 17. | "Alice in Wonderland" | Christofer Olofsson |
| 18. | "My BPM Might Be Off, But My Heart is Running Like a Clock" | Olof Gardestrand |
| 19. | "UHOH" | Kristoffer Ekstrand |
| 20. | "Troublemaking" | Tobias Granstrand |
| 21. | "To the Clouds" | Micke Larsson |
| 22. | "The Wave" | David Ottosson |
| 23. | "Sick of Love" | Jacob Sollenberg |
| 24. | "Kosmonaut" | Martin Alfredsson |
| 25. | "Hang On" | Emanuel Lundgren |
| 26. | "Matilda" | Jakob Jonsson |
| 27. | "Dreaming My Dreams" | Julie Witwicki Carlsson |
