= 4 (Dungen album) =

Studio album by Dungen
- Released: 24 September 2008 (Sweden); 30 September 2008 (U.S.)
- Genres: Psychedelic rock, progg
- Length: 37:37
- Labels: Subliminal Sounds (SE); Kemado (US)

Dungen chronology
Tio bitar (2007)	4 (2008)	Skit i allt (2010)

Professional ratings
Aggregate scores
Source	Rating
Metacritic	79/100
Review scores
Source	Rating
Allmusic	link
ChartAttack	link
FACT Magazine	(7.5/10) link
JustPressPlay	link
Paste	(84/100) link
Pitchfork Media	(7.8/10) link
Spin	link
Twisted Ear	link

4 is the fifth album by the Swedish psychedelic rock group Dungen.

It was released as a CD on 24 September 2008 by Subliminal Sounds (Sweden). The album was released in the US on Kemado Records on 30 September 2008.

== Track listing ==
All tracks are written by Gustav Ejstes.

No.	Title	English translation	Length
1.	"Sätt att se"	Ways to See	4:45
2.	"Målerås finest"		2:22
3.	"Det tar tid"	It Takes Time	4:16
4.	"Samtidigt 1"	Simultaneously 1	3:15
5.	"Ingenting är sig likt"	Nothing is the Same	2:59
6.	"Fredag"	Friday	4:20
7.	"Finns det någon möjlighet"	Is There Any Possibility	3:55
8.	"Mina damer och fasaner"	My Ladies and Pheasants	3:43
9.	"Samtidigt 2"	Simultaneously 2	4:39
10.	"Bandhagen"		3:23
Total length:			37:37

== Personnel ==
- Gustav Ejstes – flute, organ, percussion, piano, strings, vocals, producer, engineer
- Reine Fiske – bass guitar, guitar, percussion
- Mattias Gustafsson – bass guitar on 3, 8 and 9
- Carl-Michael Herlöfsson – mastering
- Johan Holmegard – percussion, drums
- Anna Järvinen – backing vocals on 5 and 8
- Stefan Kéry – executive producer and cover design
- Pierre Lindsjöö – assistant engineer
- Karl Max – portraits
- Fredrik Swahn – bass guitar on 6
