= Wylde Mammoths =

Wylde Mammoths were founded in Stockholm, Sweden in the mid-1980s and were part of the thriving garage rock scene of the day which included The Stomachmouths, High Speed V, Crimson Shadows and The Creeps. In 1986 they were signed to the American label Crypt Records, being one of the first new bands Crypt released, before that they mostly made 1960s garage compilations like the Back from the Grave-series. Being very influenced by the music of the 1960s themselves, The Wylde Mammoths recorded their first album in singer Peter Maniette's basement only using an old 2-track Beocord tape recorder. Tours of the US and Europe and more records followed before the band split up in the early 1990s.

== Band members ==
- Peter Maniette – vocals, guitar
- Per Wannerberg – guitar
- Patrick Emt – bass
- Stellan Wahlström – drums

== Discography ==
=== Albums ===
- Go Baby Go!! (Crypt Records) 1987
- Things That Matter (Crypt Records) 1988

=== Singles and EP's ===
- Four Wolly Giants EP (Mystery Scene Records) 1986
- Help That Girl EP (Crypt Records) 1987
- I Can't Go Without You/Deep Down In Misery (Splendid magazine 3 flexi) 1988
- Before I's Too Late/I Can't Win (Unique Records) 1990
- You Gotta Go EP (Misty Lane Records) 1994

=== Compilations ===
- 60-tals Popjubileum - Live at Tyrol (New Music Records) 1989
- Roots of Swedish pop - The garage days vol 2 (Uppers Records) 1996
