= Allas Sak =

Studio album by Dungen
- Released: 25 September 2015
- Genre: Psychedelic rock, progressive rock, progg
- Length: 41:43
- Label: Smalltown Supersound (Eur); Mexican Summer (US)

Dungen chronology
Skit i allt (2010)	Allas Sak (2015)	Häxan (2016)

Professional ratings
Aggregate scores
Source	Rating
Metacritic	81/100
Review scores
Source	Rating
AllMusic	4/5 stars
NOW	4/5 stars
Pitchfork Media	8/10

Allas Sak is the seventh album by the Swedish psychedelic rock group Dungen. The title loosely translates into English as "everyone's thing" or "anyone's thing".

It was released as a CD and vinyl on 25 September 2015 through the Norwegian label Smalltown Supersound. The album was released in the US through Mexican Summer with a limited 1500-copy first pressing on red vinyl.

It was produced by Mattias Glavå and recorded in Kungsten Studios, Fashion Police Studios, In Kullhammar, Rösarne and Alstermo Airports by Mattias Glavå, Sven Johansson and Petter Winnberg

== Track listing ==
Lyrics and music by Gustav Ejstes.

No.	Title	English translation	Length
1.	"Allas Sak"	Everyone's Thing	3:29
2.	"Sista Festen"	The Last Feast	2:25
3.	"Sista Gästen"	The Last Guest	2:41
4.	"Franks Kaktus"	Frank's Cactus	5:40
5.	"En Gång Om Året"	Once a Year	4:32
6.	"Åkt Dit"	Gone There	3:01
7.	"En Dag På Sjön"	A Day on the Lake	4:14
8.	"Flickor Och Pojkar"	Girls and Boys	3:10
9.	"Ljus In i Min Panna"	Light Into My Head	3:57
10.	"Sova"	Sleep	8:34
Total length:			41:43

== Personnel ==
- Gustav Ejstes
- Reine Fiske
- Mattias Gustavsson
- Johan Holmegard
- Jonas Kullhammar – Saxophone, Clarinet
