= Stadsvandringar =

Studio album by Dungen
- Released: October 2002
- Genre: Psychedelic rock, progg
- Length: 38:01
- Label: Dolores Recordings (SE), Astralwerks (US)

Dungen chronology
Dungen (2001)	Stadsvandringar (2002)	Ta det lugnt (2004)

Professional ratings
Review scores
Source	Rating
Allmusic	3.5/5 stars

Stadsvandringar ("City Walks") is the CD version of the Swedish psychedelic rock group Dungen's second album.

It was originally released by Subliminal Sounds in 2002 in a limited vinyl edition of 500 copies under the name Dungen 2. The CD version was released that year on Dolores Recordings and contained some alternative tracks. The album was re-issued by Astralwerks in 2005 for US distribution.

== Track listing ==
No.	Title	English translation	Length
1.	"Stadsvandringar"	City Walks	3:17
2.	"Har du vart' i Stockholm?"	Have You Been to Stockholm?	3:43
3.	"Solen stiger upp Del 1 & Del 2"	The Sun Rises Part 1 & Part 2	4:06
4.	"Stock och sten"	Logs and Stones	3:28
5.	"Sol och regn"	Sun and Rain	4:23
6.	"Fest"	Party	3:37
7.	"Natten blir dag"	The Night Becomes Day	3:07
8.	"Andra sidan sjön"	The Other Side of the Lake	4:06
9.	"Stadsvandring Del 2"	City Walk Part 2	0:34
10.	"Vem vaktar lejonen?"	Who Guards the Lions?	3:39
11.	"Krona"	Crown	4:01
Total length:			38:01
