= Abner Jay =

American musician

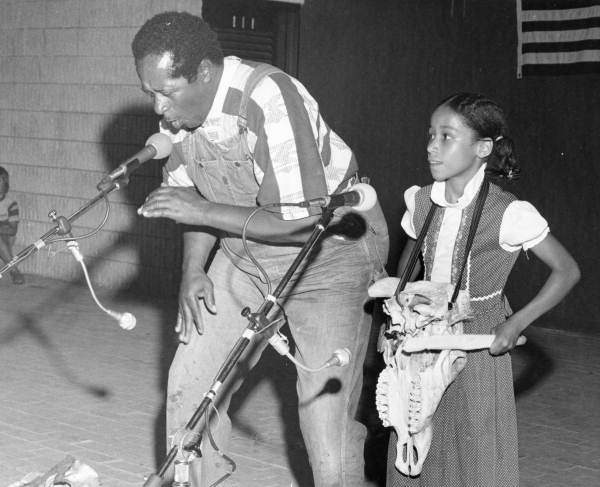
- Abner Jay performing in 1978, with a child playing the bones

Background information
- Born: Abner Wingate Jay; July 15, 1921; Fitzgerald, Georgia, United States
- Died: November 4, 1993 (aged 72) Augusta, Georgia, U.S.
- Genres: Folk, blues
- Instruments: Vocals; Six-string Banjo; Guitar; Harmonica; Drums

Abner Wingate Jay (July 15, 1921 – November 4, 1993) was an American multi-instrumentalist from Georgia, best known for performing eccentric, blues infused folk music as a one man band. His idiosyncratic lyrics and style have led some to consider his work outsider music; he considered himself to be "the last working Southern black minstrel".

Reviewer Jon Dale has described his recordings as "one of the most individual takes on traditional song form to have risen from the 20th century". Releasing his recordings on his own label, Jay has also been described as a pioneer independent recording artist. Composer Anthony Braxton called Jay an "American Master".

== Biography ==
Jay was born in Fitzgerald, Georgia. His grandfather was a slave in Washington County, Georgia. His grandfather was also a banjo player and imparted a vast repertoire of old-time and folk songs to Abner. Abner Jay began playing guitar and later banjo in medicine shows at the age of 5, and also performed for white plantation owners. He joined the Rabbit Foot Minstrels, and in 1932 joined the rival Silas Green from New Orleans tent show. From around 1935, he performed as a one-man band. In his twenties, he survived throat cancer, resulting in his distinctive bass voice. He also sang with a jubilee quartet, The Sunlight Four, and during World War II toured with his band, the Jay Brothers band.

He became confidante and driver for "Prophetess" Dolly Lewis, a singer, evangelical preacher and healer in the Southern United States, and was briefly also the agent and manager of Sister Rosetta Tharpe. Jay went on to lead the WMAZ Minstrels on Macon radio from 1946 to 1956. He spent many years traveling the South and playing concerts of "bittersweet but heartfelt comic blues" from his "converted mobile home that opened up into a portable stage, complete with amplification and home furnishings". These concerts, as evidenced in his recordings, were often equal parts spoken word (crude humor, jokes, philosophical asides, rants) and music.

Jay also worked as a booking agent for Little Richard and James Brown, and briefly led his own rock and roll band, Big Abner Jay. In the early 1960s, he tried to start a career as a singer on Broadway in New York, but after that failed to materialize - and having some 16 children to support - he instead established himself as a live performer in clubs in and around Atlanta. From 1974, he established himself as an attraction on the college circuit and the Stephen Foster Folk Culture Center State Park in White Springs, Florida. In 1982, Jay was interviewed over seven hours by writer Jas Obrecht. The interview was published in Guitar Player magazine that year, drawing wider attention to Jay. Jay also, at various times, ran a restaurant and managed nightclubs. In later years he held a residency, playing shows and selling his LPs and cassette tapes released on his own label, Brandie Records, at Tom Flynn's Plantation Restaurant in Stone Mountain, Georgia.

Jay's song repertoire included field songs, Stephen Foster songs, Pentecostal hymns and minstrel tunes. He performed original material that was mostly secular, and subjects ranged from politics, relationships, drugs, war, the bible, the 1969 Moon landing, ethnomusicology, Southern culture and depression. Common instruments on Jay's recordings include harmonica, drum kit, a six-string banjo (that Jay claimed was made in 1748), and the "bones", which were chicken and cow bones that had been bleached in the sun and used to create percussion. He once described himself as the "last working Southern black minstrel", and in a self-penned leaflet handed out at concerts, he expanded on his biography with claims that he was the "World's Champion Cotton Picker and Pea Picker, World's Fastest Tobacco Crapper, World's Greatest Jaw Bone Player, World's Fastest Mule Skinner... THE WORLD'S WORSE BUSINESS MAN". After his death, record label owner Eric Isaacson said of Jay: "He had this whole image of himself as this ancient troubadour who was playing this forgotten kind of music, even though in reality most of the songs and styles were very unique to just him." Anthony Braxton, renowned American composer and philosopher, called Jay an "American Master".

He died at a veterans' hospital in Augusta, Georgia, in 1993, aged 72.

== Recordings ==
For many years, Jay released his music and monologues in editions of less than 500, through his own record label, Brandie Records (so-named for his daughter). He released eight albums himself. In 2003 Subliminal Sounds from Sweden released a compilation of his work titled One Man Band, which had been out of print since the 1970s, drawing from three of Jay's best recordings. In 2009 Portland-based label Mississippi Records began their series of releasing compilations of his work on vinyl with the compilation True Story Of and the two song 7 inch record Depression/Im So Depressed which features two versions of Abner's most notable song of the same name. These re-releases helped garner a degree of renewed interest in the artist, including Vice Magazine naming it album of the month (Vol. 10 #11). In the following years of 2010 and 2011, Mississippi Records released two more compilations of his work, the 1964–73 recordings of Folk Song Stylist released in 2010 and Last Ole Ministrel Man released in 2011. Later in 2021 Mississippi Records again released another compilation titled I Dont Have Time To Lie To You.

== Discography ==
=== Albums ===
- Terrible Comedy Blues (Poison Apple Records, 1968)
- Folk Song Stylist (Wing Gate Records, N.D.)
- True Story Of Dixie (Brandie Records, 1974)
- Swaunee Water And Cocaine Blues (Brandie Records, 1976)
- The Backbone Of America Is A Mule And Cotton (Brandie Records, 1976)
- Live From Stephen Foster Center Kitchen (Brandie Records, N.D.)
- Sings And Plays Stephen Fosters Favorites (Plantation Records, N.D.)

=== EPs ===
- Last Ole Minstrel Man ( Mississippi Records, 2011)
- Hambone And Rattle The Bones (Brandie Records/Social Music Records, 2012)

=== Singles ===
- "My Mule"/"Don't Mess With Me Baby" (Peacock Records, 1961)
- "Cleo"/"The Thresher" (London Records, 1963)
- "Depression"/"I'm So Depressed" (Mississippi Records, 2009)
- "I Trust In God" (Delden Records, N.D.)
- "I Wanna Job" (Wing Gate Records, N.D.)

=== Compilation albums ===
- One Man Band (compilation, Subliminal Sounds 2003)
- True Story Of Abner Jay (Mississippi Records, 2009)
- Folk Song Stylist (Mississippi Records, 2010)
- Man Walked on the Moon (Mississippi Records, 2019)
- I Don't Have Time To Lie To You (Mississippi Records, 2021)
