= I'm Going Away (disambiguation) =

I'm Going Away is an album by The Fiery Furnaces.

I'm Going Away may also refer to:

- "I'm Going Away" (How to Get Away with Murder episode), an episode of the legal drama How to Get Away with Murder
- "I'm Going Away", a 1976 single by Mahogany Rush, Marino from Mahogany Rush IV
- "I'm Going Away", a song by The Stomachmouths
- "I'm Going Away", a song by The Greenhornes from East Grand Blues (also released as Pattern Skies) EP
- I'm Going Away, a 1950 Arabic-language novel by Yusuf Sibai and the Egyptian film adaptation
