= Ancient Astronauts (album) =

Studio album by Motorpsycho
- Released: 19 August 2022
- Recorded: 2021
- Studio: Amper Tone, (Oslo)
- Genre: Progressive rock; avant-rock
- Length: 43:30
- Label: Stickman Records; Rune Grammofon; Motorpsychodelic Tunes
- Producer: Deathprod

Motorpsycho chronology
| Kingdom of Oblivion (2021) | Ancient Astronauts (2022) | Yay! (2023) |

Ancient Astronauts is a studio album by Norwegian rock band Motorpsycho. It was released on 19 August 2022, through the record labels Rune Grammofon, Motorpsychodelic Tunes and Stickman Records. It was released on vinyl, CD, and digital media.

== Background ==
Motorpsycho collaborated with choreographer and founder of the Impure Dance Company Hooman Sharifi in which they provided live music for a solo dance performance. At his request for more music they built upon compositions that would become the songs "Mona Lisa/Azrael" and "Chariot Of The Sun". This inspired them to work on a new project which would be soundtracking a film featuring a Norwegian theatre performance group whom they have worked with previously called De Utvalgte, local dancers and the band themselves. They named the project "Ancient Astronauts" and filmed it at the Ringnes Festival in Skotbu, Norway.

Commenting on the film project's name which would eventually become the album's title the band's lead vocalist/multi-instrumentalist Bent Sæther stated that, "as a rock band you sometimes feel like you're picking up traces from all these other ancient astronauts that have travelled the same musical highways as you have. And sometimes you feel like you might be the ones leaving traces for future generations."

Far from being a fringe theory as it is often portrayed, an example of the earliest ancient astronauts influencing future humanity was presented by the Nobel award-winning molecular biologist Francis Crick whose research helped reveal the helical structure of DNA. After studying DNA, which is the basis of life on earth he theorized in a publication co-authored with chemist Leslie Orgel in 1973 that it was not able to originate on earth by itself but rather was transmitted through the process of directed panspermia in which ancient extraterrestrial astronauts sent DNA to earth to help start the development of life for the future.

In another interview the band further showed how they were motivated by the principle of the theory of ancient astronauts in that they were inspired by and acting as ancient astronauts themselves saying, "sometimes we feel like we're just rediscovering ancient knowledge left here for us to find by previous generations (standing on the shoulders of giants so to speak), but sometimes you feel like you're the one depositing material for future artists to hopefully be inspired by too."

== Musical style, writing, composition ==
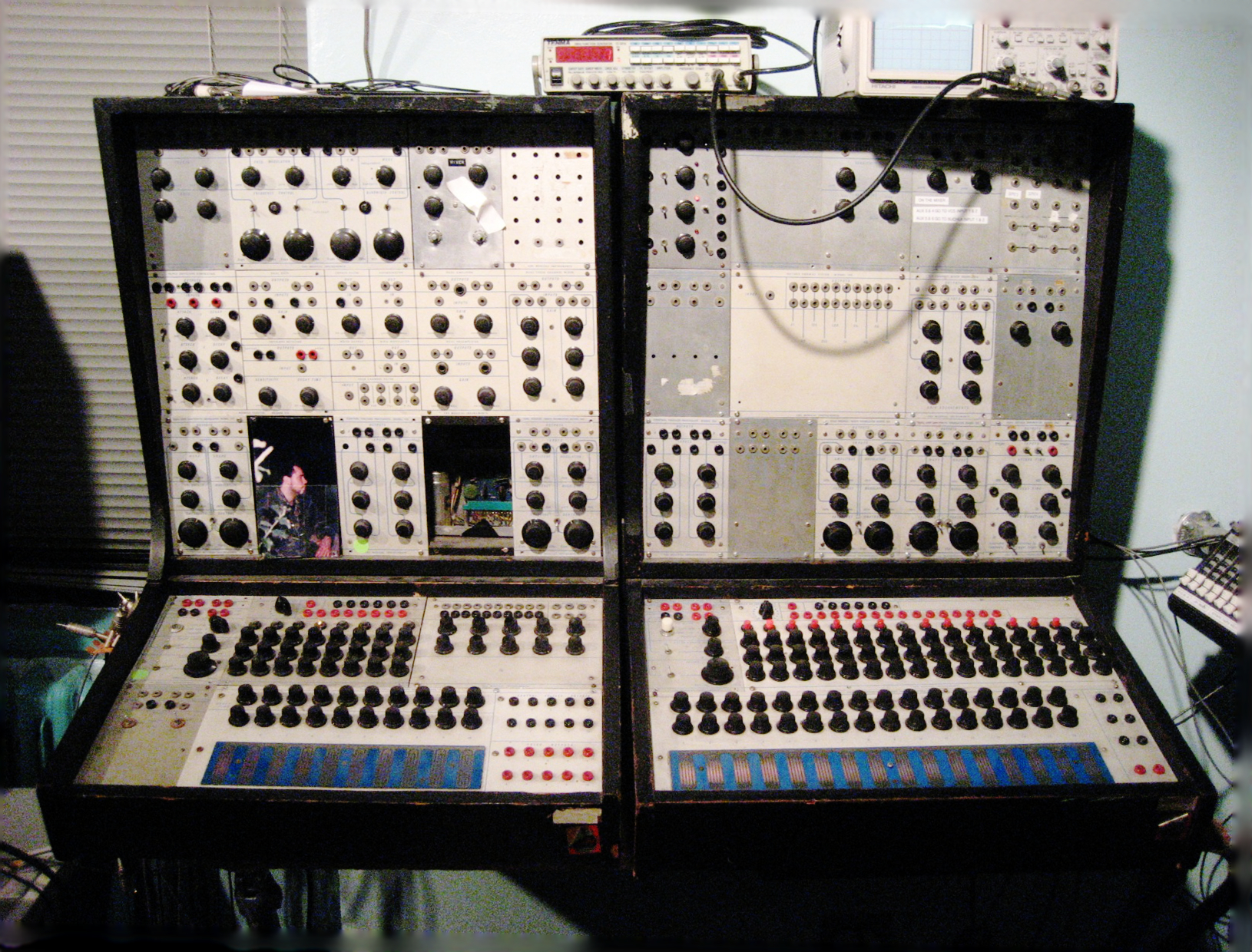
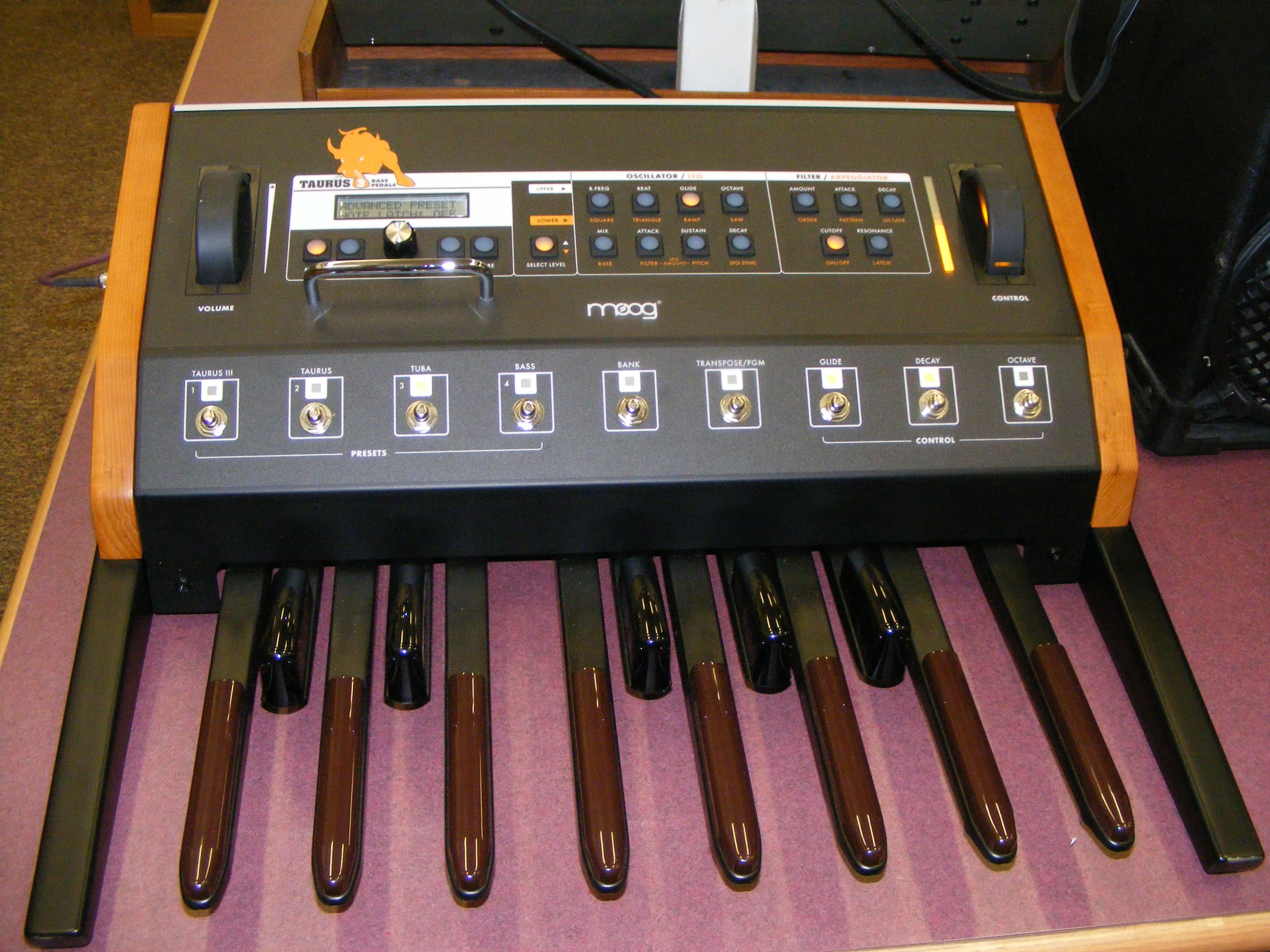
An original Buchla synthesizer like the one played on the album and the Taurus III which is a foot controlled bass synthesizer.

The album features songwriting techniques, instrumentation and production similar to the initial era of progressive rock made in the 1966 to 1974 time period. The statement by Bent Sæther about the band's lean in this direction for the current album was that, "I'd say we're pre-progressive. I really enjoy the spirit of a lot of those albums and artists. I can really get into that mindset." This included the use of instruments such as multi-neck guitars/basses, synthesizers and electronics including the Mellotron, Buchla and the Moog Taurus 3. PopMatters brought out the early prog style influence with the band "manifesting 1970s progressive rock (think Canterbury scene) for contemporary times."

Adding to the final sound produced included the Gibson SG Standard played by guitarist Hans Magnus "Snah" Ryan through various Marshall JMP amps with Cornish guitar effects pedals. The bass gear consisted of a Danelectro 4/6 double neck, Sunn Model T, Acoustic 470 amp heads and effects including the Catalinbread Echorec, EHX POG (polyphonic octave generator), Fjord Fuzz Embla, and a Schaffer–Vega Storm.

The songs were created independently musically and lyrical with no overall theme which was confirmed by the band when asked if it was a concept album. "The only real concept albums we have done are the commissioned works that were written for something particular" such as their albums The Death Defying Unicorn and En Konsert For Folk Flest.

== Recording, production ==
A week after completion of the filming the band entered Amper Tone studio in Oslo to record the tracks for a new album. They performed as a trio recording the songs live for the majority of the album. Few overdubs were later added. The bands occasional collaborator guitarist Reine Fiske could not travel from his home in Stockholm to compose or record with the band due to travel restrictions at the time. The band had to take up extra musical roles as Sæther commented they were double and triple tasking during the recordings as he was, "doublenecking all the way and bass pedaling along..." This was heard on the elaborate twenty-two minute long "Chariot Of The Sun – To Phaeton On The Occasion Of Sunrise (Theme From An Imagined Movie)" which was described by Louder Sound as, "gnarly avant-rock that grows ever more urgent and intense." Helge Sten contributed his buchla synth playing to the track "Flower of Awareness". This resulted in a shorter length composition full of "controlled industrial feedback and rumbling, low-end drones".

== Artwork, promotion ==
The album cover and artwork features images of the band members from the film they created at the Ringnes Festival in Skotbu, Norway. The band promoted the album with European performances and festival appearances including a tour of England in 2023 which was the first time they toured there in 3 years.

== Critical reception ==
Professional ratings
Aggregate scores
| Source | Rating |
|---|---|
| Metacritic | 82/100 |
Review scores
| Source | Rating |
| AllMusic | 4/5 stars |
| Classic Rock | 3.5/5 stars |
| Klassekampen | 5/6 stars |
| Laut.de | 4/5 stars |
| Metal Hammer | 5/7 |
| Mojo | 4/4 stars |
| Norway Rock | 5/6 |
| Prog Rocks | 8/10 |
| Rock Hard | 8.0/10 |
| Sputnikmusic | 4/5 |
| Visions | 9/12 |

Ancient Astronauts received a score of 82 out of 100 on review aggregator Metacritic based on 4 critic reviews resulting in a generally favorable reception. Metal Hammer described the album as a work from a band "that operates seamlessly on the cosmic sonic boundaries of psychedelic, prog and space rock..." The song "Chariot Of The Sun – To Phaeton On The Occasion Of Sunrise (Theme From An Imagined Movie)" was described by Classic Rock magazine as a "full-blown fuzz-pedal rock monster" with musical passages containing, "drones and shimmering interplay, highs and stupefying lows." Mojo observed "The Ladder" as a "highspeed spin cycle of switchback riffing and molten-fuzz soloing, King Crimson's Red taken for a ride by Rush."

AllMusic showed that although the band was reduced to the power trio format without guitarist Reine Fiske they multitasked a cohesive album saying, "No matter how far afield this obsessive adventure travels, it remains compellingly listenable, and Motorpsycho never lose the plot." This saw them arriving, "at yet another creative peak."

== Track listing ==
| No. | Title | Writer(s) | Length |
|---|---|---|---|
| 1. | "The Ladder" | Sæther | 6:40 |
| 2. | "The Flower of Awareness" | Järmyr; Sten | 2:13 |
| 3. | "Mona Lisa/Azreal" | Ryan; Sæther | 12:14 |
| 4. | "Chariot of the Sun – To Phaeton on the Occasion of Sunrise (Theme from an Imagined Movie)" | Järmyr; Ryan; Sæther | 22:22 |
| Total length: | | | 43:30 |

== Personnel ==
- Bent Sæther – lead vocals, bass, guitars, keyboards
- Hans Magnus "Snah" Ryan – lead guitars, vocals, keyboards
- Tomas Järmyr – drums

=== Additional musicians ===
- Helge Sten – Buchla synthesizer, various electronics, audio virus

=== Technical personnel ===
- Johan Harstad – Cover Design
- Daniel Krieger – Lacquer Cut
- Bent Sæther – mixing, additional recordings
- Andrew Scheps – mixing
- De Utvalgte – Photography
- Kim Lillestøl – Recording
- Motorpsycho – Devised and arrangement
- Deathprod – Producer and mastering

== Charts ==
| Chart (2022) | Peak position |
|---|---|
| Norwegian Albums (VG-lista) | 8 |
| German Albums (Offizielle Top 100) | 80 |
| Swiss Albums (Schweizer Hitparade) | 96 |

== Release history ==
| Region | Date | Label | Format | Catalog |
|---|---|---|---|---|
| Norway | 2022-08-19 | Rune Grammofon | CD | MPCD 106 |
| Norway | 2022-08-19 | Rune Grammofon | LP | MPLP 306 |
| Europe | 2022-08-19 | Stickman Records | LP/CD | Psychobabble 125 |
