= Amason (band) =

Swedish musical band

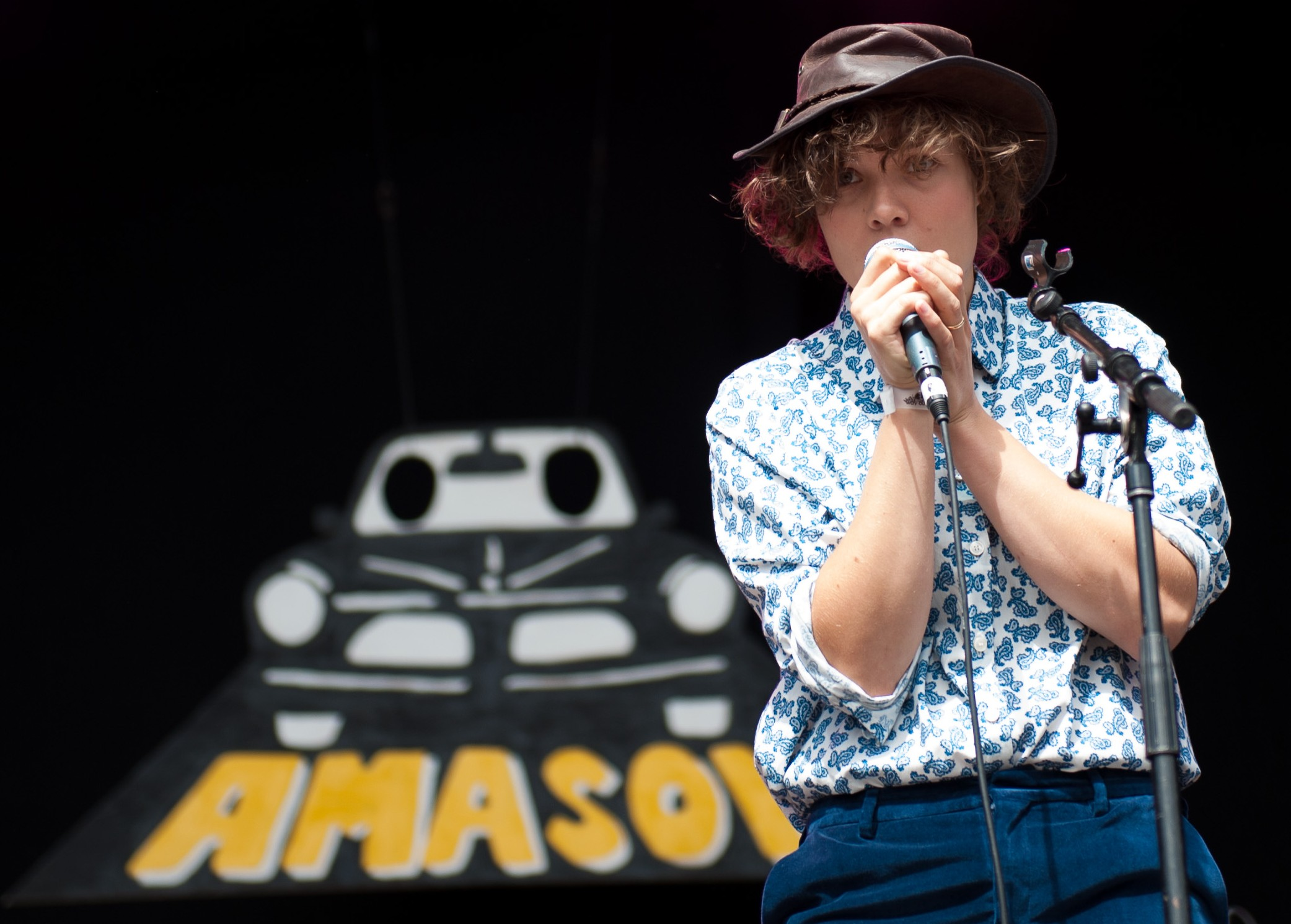
- Amanda Bergman performing with Amason in 2013

Background information
- Origin: Sweden
- Years active: 2012–present
- Label: Ingrid
- Members: Amanda Bergman; Gustav Ejstes; Pontus Winnberg; Nils Törnqvist; Petter Winnberg
- Website: amasonband.com

Amason is a Swedish musical band made up of vocalist Amanda Bergman (also known as Hajen, Jaw Lesson, and Idiot Wind); guitarist, keyboardist, and vocalist Gustav Ejstes (from Dungen); keyboardist Pontus Winnberg (from Miike Snow and Bloodshy & Avant); drummer Nils Törnqvist (from Little Majorette); and bassist Petter Winnberg (from Little Majorette).

Amason was formed in December 2012 and released their self-titled EP in August 2013, via Stockholm-based label Ingrid. In January 2015, the band issued their debut album, Sky City, with lyrics in both English and Swedish. In October of the same year, they released their second EP, Flygplatsen, with songs in Swedish exclusively. In 2016, they published the EP California Airport Love, which includes the English version of "Flygplatsen" as well as a cover of Foreigner's "I Want to Know What Love Is" and the Mamas & the Papas' "California Dreamin'".

Sky City won the Grammis (Swedish Grammys) for Album of the Year. The band was also nominated for Artist of the Year, Pop of the Year, Lyricist of the Year, Composer of the Year, and New Artist of the Year at the same awards ceremony. The following year, their video for "I Want to Know What Love Is", directed by Filip Nilsson, was nominated for a Grammis for Video of the Year.

== Band members ==
- Amanda Bergman – vocals, keyboard
- Gustav Ejstes – vocals, guitar, keyboard
- Pontus Winnberg – keyboard
- Nils Törnqvist – drums
- Petter Winnberg – bass

== Discography ==
Studio albums

Year	Album	Peak positions
Year	Album	SWE
2015	Sky City	12
2019	Galaxy I	11
2021	Galaxy II	–

EPs

- EP (2013)
- Flygplatsen (2015)
- California Airport Love (2016)

Singles

- "Margins" (2013)
- "Went to War" (2013)
- "Ålen" (2013)
- "Duvan" (2014)
