= Orpheus Nine =

American progressive band

Orpheus Nine is an American progressive band, founded by keyboardist and lead vocalist Jason Kresge. The quartet plays "keyboard-driven symphonic prog," which they describe as "modern progressive rock with infusions of classical, jazz, metal, and electronica."

== History ==
Jason Kresge began Orpheus Nine as a solo project before enlisting drummer and former schoolmate Daniel Nydick in 2005; Kresge cites Nydick's "critical contributions during the band’s formative years" as crucial toward getting songs written and played, including at their first live gig in 2011. Nydick left amicably and was replaced in 2012 by Mark DeGregory, who joined Kresge, guitarist Matt Ullestad, and bassist Tony Renda to complete the band's still-current lineup.

The band released debut album Transcendental Circus on September 9, 2017, via independent label Prog Cabin Records. England’s PROG Magazine published one of the earliest major reviews, initially faulting them for "unapologetic plundering of 40-plus years of prog indulgence" before concluding that "Orpheus Nine are among the best bands ploughing this ageless furrow." Transcendental Circus landed in the top 25 albums of 2017 at ProgArchives.

Orpheus Nine performed twice at ProgStock Festival in the US, in 2018 and 2022, and at Fusion Festival in the UK in 2023.

Numerous posts on the band's social media pages have pointed to a forthcoming second album entitled Utopian Gothic, Act 1: Pipe Dreams and Guillotines. However, no official announcement has yet appeared, and no release date has been confirmed.

== Band members ==
Current members:

- Jason Kresge — keyboards, lead vocals
- Matt Ullestad — guitar
- Tony Renda — bass, backing vocals
- Mark DeGregory — drums, backing vocals

Former members:

- Daniel Nydick (2005-2011)

== Discography ==
- Transcendental Circus (2017)
