= Neigh!! =

Studio album by Motorpsycho
- Released: September 13, 2024
- Studio: The Cheese Factory Kommun'
- Genre: Psychedelic rock, progressive rock, alternative rock
- Length: 40:53
- Label: Det Nordenfjeldske Grammofonselskab
- Producer: Bent Sæther, Hans Magnus Ryan (under the monikers Beard One and Beard Two)

Motorpsycho chronology
Yay! (2023)	Neigh!! (2024)	Motorpsycho (2025)

Professional ratings
Review scores
Source	Rating
Sputnikmusic	3.7/5 stars

Neigh!! is a studio album by Norwegian rock band Motorpsycho, released on September 13, 2024, through Det Nordenfjeldske Grammofonselskab. The album is available in vinyl and digital download formats. It was conceived in the Covid years, like the predecessor Yay!, and contains some contributions of drummer Tomas Järmyr, who left in January 2023, leaving only two band members.

== Musical style ==
Unlike its sort of counterpiece Yay!, the album has far less acoustic pieces and more guitar rock, switching from Americana to stoner rock, but still inducing some catchy singalongs.

== Track listing ==
No.	Title	Writer(s)	Length
1.	"Psycholab"	Bent Sæther	5:40
2.	"Return To Sanity"	Sæther	4:01
3.	"This Is Your Captain"	Sæther, Hans Magnus Ryan	7:04
4.	"All My Life (I Love You)"	Alexander Spence	3:20
5.	"Edgar's Bathtub"	Sæther, Ryan	0:55
6.	"Elysium, Soon"	Sæther	8:07
7.	"Revenants"	Sæther	3:44
8.	"Crownee Says"	Sæther, Ryan	3:55
9.	"Condor"	Sæther, Ryan	4:07
Total length:			40:53

== Personnel ==
Motorpsycho

- Bent Sæther – lead vocals, background vocals, violin, organ, electric guitar, acoustic guitar, rhythm guitar, bass guitar, percussion, synthesizer, mellotron
- Hans Magnus Ryan – lead vocals, background vocals, lead guitar, bass guitar, drums, synthesizer, mellotron, gong

With

- Tomas Järmyr – drums (on #3 and #6)
- Reine Fiske - lead guitar (on #4)
