= Don't Give Up on Your Dreams, Buddy! =

EP by I'm from Barcelona
- Released: February 15, 2006
- Length: 14:10
- Label: Dolores Recordings / EMI Sweden

Don't Give Up on Your Dreams, Buddy! is an EP by I'm from Barcelona. It charted for 13 weeks in Sverigetopplistan, the official Swedish Singles Chart peaking at number 12.

== Track listing ==
1. "We're from Barcelona" (2:59)
2. "Treehouse" (5:02)
3. "Ola Kala" (3:39)
4. "The Painter" (3:30)

== Charts ==
Chart (2013)	Peak position
Sweden (Sverigetopplistan)	12
