= Dungen (album) =

Studio album by Dungen
- Released: 2001, 2005
- Genre: Psychedelic rock Swedish folk Progg
- Length: 36:45, 45:00
- Label: Subliminal Sounds

Dungen chronology
Dungen (2001)	Stadsvandringar (2002)

Professional ratings
Review scores
Source	Rating
Allmusic	link

Dungen is the first album by the Swedish psychedelic rock group Dungen.

It was originally released in 2001 by Subliminal Sounds on a limited vinyl edition of 500 copies. After high demand, the album was finally released on CD with some extra material in 2005 and renamed Dungen 1999-2001.

The album contains early versions of some songs found on Dungen's second studio album.

== Track listing ==
All tracks by Gustav Ejstes.

LP version
No.	Title	English translation	Length
1.	"Stadsvandringar"	City Walks	6:16
2.	"Och solen stiger upp"	And the Sun Rises	4:35
3.	"Andra sidan sjön"	Other Side of the Lake	7:35
4.	"Mitten av mars"	Middle of March	3:08
5.	"Du och jag..."	You and Me...	3:34
6.	"Och du frågar mig varför ..."	And You Ask Me Why...	3:29
7.	"Tillsammans"	Together	3:30
8.	"Känslan som gror"	The Feeling That Grows	4:38
Total length:			36:45

CD version
No.	Title	English translation	Length
1.	"Stadsvandringar"	City Walks	14:49
2.	"Midsommarbongen"	The Midsummer Bong	18:34
3.	"Lilla vännen"	The Little Friend	11:37
Total length:			45:00

== Personnel ==
- Gustav Ejstes – bass guitar, flute, guitar, violin, arranger, drums, keyboards, vocals, producer
- Reine Fiske – bass guitar, guitar, percussion
- Marco Lohikari – bass guitar
- Fredrik Björling – percussion, drums
- Christopher Schlee – guitar
- Gila Storm – vocals
- Alex Wiig – percussion, sitar
- Dungen – compilation
- Stefan Kéry – executive producer, photography, cover design
- Marie Ljungsten – photography
- Carl Abrahamsson – cover design
