= Petter Winnberg =

Swedish producer, composer and musician (born 1979)

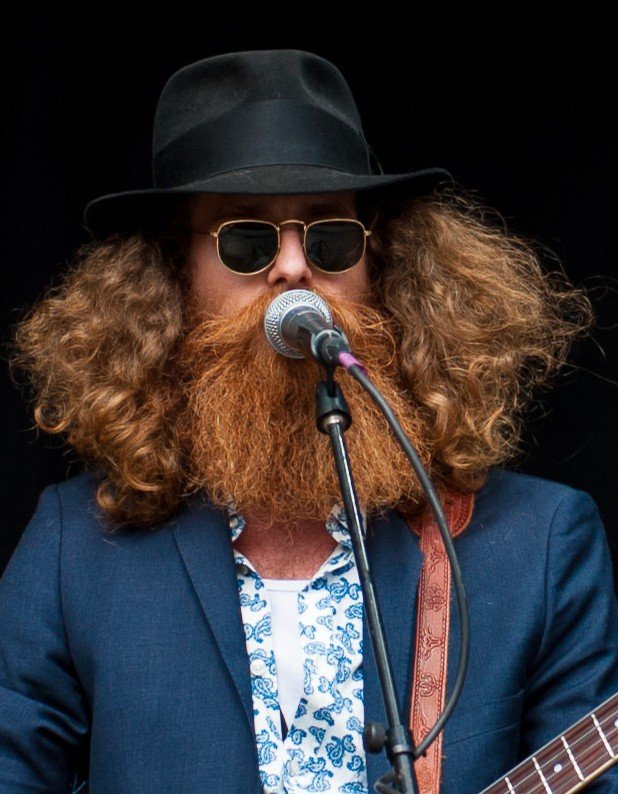

Background information
- Born: November 19, 1979 (age 46)
- Origin: Sweden
- Member of: Amason

Petter Winnberg (born November 19, 1979, in Lerum, Västergötland) is a Swedish producer, composer and musician. He is a member of the critically acclaimed Swedish band Amason, alongside Amanda Bergman, Gustav Ejstes, Pontus Winnberg, and Nils Törnqvist.

Aside from his work in Amason and other bands, Winnberg is also a composer for film and commercials and has done work for Vogue, H&M, HBO, Philips, Tork, and Netflix.

== Discography ==
Year	Artist	Album	Credit
2010	Petter & The Pix	Good as Gold	Producer, songwriter, musician, artist
2012	Little Majorette	Rifle Heart	Producer, songwriter, musician, artist
2013	Amason	EP	Producer, songwriter, musician, artist
2013	Here Is Your Temple (artist)	So High EP	Producer
2013	Tussilago (band)	EP	Producer
2014	Little Majorette	Wonder (single)	Producer, songwriter, musician, artist
2015	Amason	Sky City	Producer, songwriter, musician, artist
2015	Tussilago (band)	Holy Train	Producer
2015	Maja Francis	Last Days of Dancing (single)	Co-producer, songwriter, musician
2015	Maja Francis	Space Invades My Mind (single)	Co-producer, songwriter, musician
2015	Amason	Flygplatsen EP	Producer, songwriter, musician, artist
2016	Amanda Bergman	Docks	Producer
2016	Amason	California Airport Love EP	Producer, songwriter, musician, artist
2016	Veronica Maggio	Gjord av Sten	Producer, songwriter, musician
2016	Amanda Bergman	Flickering Lights EP	Producer
