= Stellan Wahlström Drift Band =

Swedish rock band

- Origin: Stockholm, Sweden,
- Genres: Rock; Folk rock
- Years active: 1990–present
- Label: Belpid
- Members: Stellan Wahlström; Johan Werner; Johan Adelman; Johan Svahn; Mats Grönmark

Stellan Wahlström Drift Band is a rock band from Stockholm, Sweden. The singer and songwriter Stellan Wahlström previously played with The Wylde Mammoths who released records on the American label Crypt Records and toured in Europe and in the USA. During the late 1990s the first album Time Leaves You Behind was recorded in New York by Patrick Derivaz (who had previously worked with John Cale, Luna and Television among others) followed by live shows at clubs like CBGB's, Sidewalk and Continental. The song "Watching TV" was featured in the independent film Rhimes and Reason. Wahlström has also played in England and toured in India. Back in Stockholm the band has made five more albums released by Belpid Records.

== Members ==
- Stellan Wahlström - vocals, guitars
- Johan Werner - guitars, piano, organ
- Johan Adelman - bass
- Johan Svahn - drums
- Mats Grönmark - guitar

== Discography ==
=== Albums ===
- 1999 - Time leaves you behind
- 2005 - The excitable gift
- 2009 - Across the room
- 2015 - Hotel Continental
- 2022 - As real as in a dream
- 2025 - The Sleeper - a live collection

=== Singles & EPs ===
- 1991 - Gör det fort (7" vinyl)
- 1994 - Går igen (EP)
- 2001 - So this is what the end looks like (EP)
- 2004 - Ocean Ave
- 2005 - Further away from you
- 2009 - Charlotte says
- 2010 - Burn baby burn / Good Friday
- 2015 - The mercy
- 2021 - Into the light
- 2022 - Through the alleys, across the squares
- 2025 - What are you made of? (Live)

=== Compilations ===
- 2000 - Sinderella sampler 00/01
- 2004 - Indeed a very friendly Belpid compilation
- 2008 - An utmost friendly Belpid compilation
