= Amanda Bergman =

Swedish musician

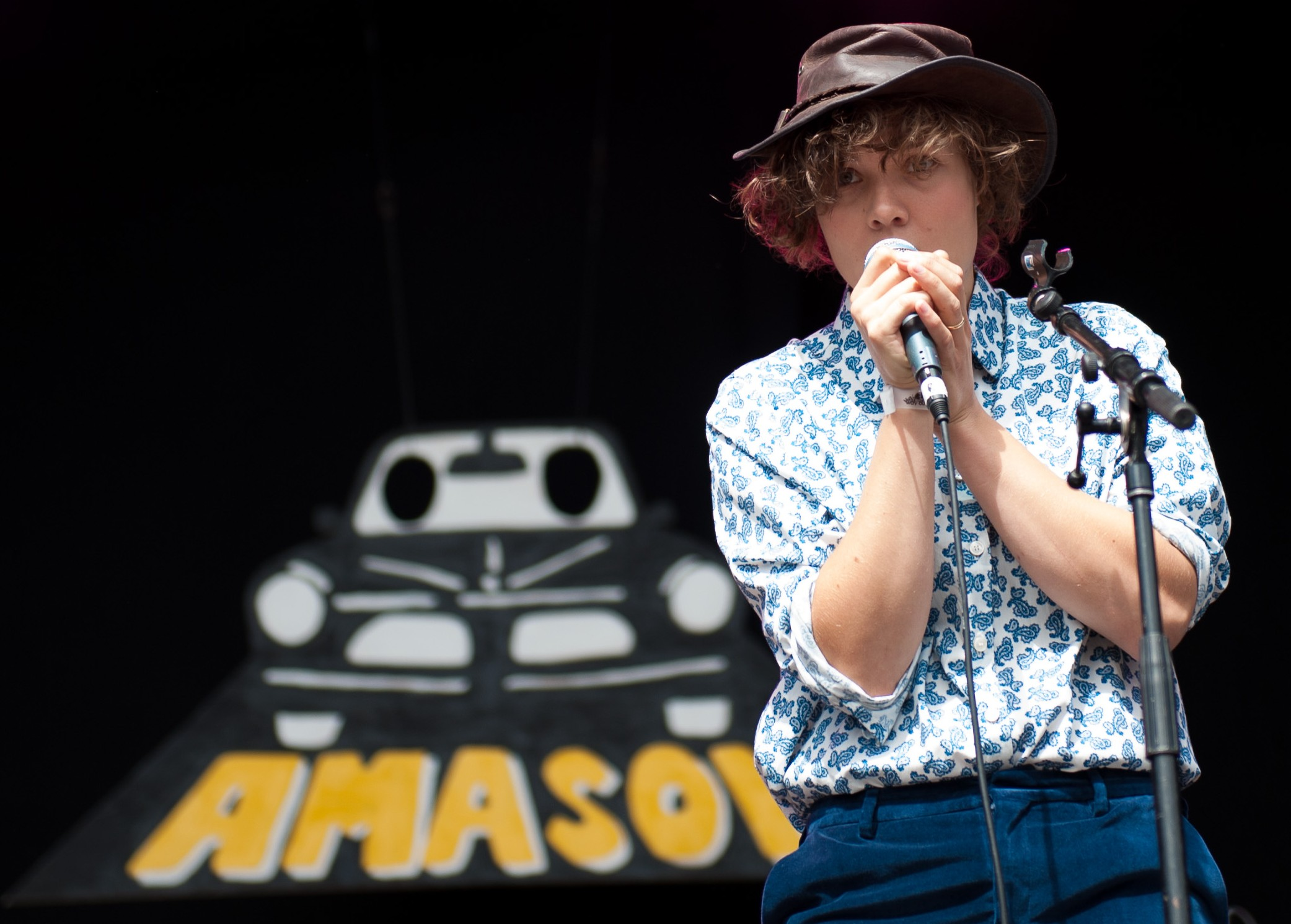
- Bergman performing with Amason at Way Out West in 2013

Background information
- Also known as: Hajen, Jaw Lesson, Idiot Wind
- Origin: Sweden
- Genres: Folk, indie
- Instruments: Piano, vocals
- Label: Ingrid
- Website: amandabergman.se

Karin Amanda Bergman Hollingby (born 1987) is a Swedish singer-songwriter from Dalarna and member of Amason. She has previously performed and released music under the stage names Idiot Wind, Jaw Lesson, and Hajen.

== Career ==
Bergman was born in 1987 and grew up in Gagnef. She began her professional career under the stage name Hajen (The shark) and used the names Jaw Lesson and Idiot Wind (from Bob Dylan's song of the same name) from 2010 to 2014.

Bergman is a member and lead-vocalist of the Swedish band Amason with Gustav Ejstes, Pontus Winnberg, Nils Törnqvist and Petter Winnberg. The band released its debut album Sky City in January 2015.

She was previously married to Kristian Matsson, also known as The Tallest Man on Earth and they cooperated on the soundtrack of Swedish director Gorki Glaser-Müller's film En gång om året (Once a year).

She also provided vocals on the album I Never Learn by Lykke Li.

Her primary instrument is the piano; however, she also plays the accordion at times.

In 2015, she had a hit with "Vintersaga", a cover of a song by Ted Ström, after it was featured in a Volvo car ad. The single was released crediting Amanda Bergman. Her debut album Docks, her first album under her own name, was released on 26 February 2016, on the record label Ingrid.

In 2016, Bergman was handpicked to perform at the Polar Music Prize ceremony, celebrating laureates Max Martin and Cecilia Bartoli. She performed the song "Love Me Harder", penned by Max Martin and originally performed by Ariana Grande.

== Discography ==
=== Solo ===
- Idiot Wind (EP) (2010)
- Find the Rhythm in the Noise (limited two-track 7") (2012) (released as Idiot Wind)
- "Vintersaga" (Single) (2015)
- "Falcons" (Single) (2016)
- Docks (Album) (2016)
- Flickering Lights (EP) (2016)
- Your Hand Forever Checking on My Fever (Album) (2024)
- "Embraced for a second as we die" (Album) (2026)

=== With Amason ===
- "Margins" (Single) (2013)
- "Went to War" (Single) (2013)
- EP (EP) (2013)
- "Ålen" (Single) (2014)
- Duvan (Single) (2014)
- Sky City (Album) (2015)
- "Kelly" (Single) (2015)
- Flygplatsen (EP) (2015)
