= Let Me Introduce My Friends =

Studio album by I'm from Barcelona
- Released: 26 April 2006
- Genres: Indie pop; baroque pop; folk rock; pop rock; indie rock
- Length: 33:28
- Label: Dolores

I'm from Barcelona chronology
Let Me Introduce My Friends (2006)	Who Killed Harry Houdini? (2008)

Professional ratings
Aggregate scores
Source	Rating
Metacritic	66/100 link
Review scores
Source	Rating
AllMusic	link
Robert Christgau	(1-star Honorable Mention)
CLUAS	(7/10) link
Music Box	link
Pitchfork Media	(8.4/10) link
Playlouder	link

Let Me Introduce My Friends is the first full-length album from the Swedish band I'm from Barcelona.

== Track listing ==
All tracks are written by Emanuel Lundgren.

No.	Title	Length
1.	"Oversleeping"	2:18
2.	"Collection of Stamps"	2:49
3.	"We're from Barcelona"	3:02
4.	"Treehouse"	5:02
5.	"Jenny"	2:26
6.	"Ola Kala"	2:39
7.	"Chicken Pox"	3:33
8.	"Rec & Play"	2:55
9.	"This Boy" (featuring Loney, Dear)	3:15
10.	"Barcelona Loves You"	2:44
11.	"The Saddest Lullaby" (featuring Mathias Alrikson)	2:45
Total length:		33:28

2007 UK edition bonus tracks
No.	Title	Length
12.	"The Painter"	3:30
13.	"Glasses"	2:54
Total length:		39:52
