= Who Killed Harry Houdini? =

Studio album by I'm from Barcelona
- Released: 14 October 2008
- Genres: Indie pop; baroque pop; folk rock; pop rock; indie rock
- Length: 36:50
- Label: Mute
- Producers: Emanuel Lundgren, Fabian Torsson

I'm from Barcelona chronology
Let Me Introduce My Friends (2006)	Who Killed Harry Houdini? (2008)	27 Songs from Barcelona (2010)

Who Killed Harry Houdini? is the second full-length studio album by Swedish indie pop band I'm from Barcelona, released on October 14, 2008. A streaming version of the album's single, "Paper Planes", was released on Spin on July 15, 2008. It was co-produced by band leader Emanuel Lundgren, and Fabian Torsson.

== Critical reception ==
Professional ratings
Aggregate scores
Source	Rating
Metacritic	68/100
Review scores
Source	Rating
AbsolutePunk	8.0/10
AllMusic	3.5/5 stars
ChartAttack	link
Robert Christgau	(dud)
Pitchfork	5.9/10
PopMatters	8/10 stars
Spectrum Culture	link
Spin	3.5/5 stars
Tiny Mix Tapes	4/5 stars

Who Killed Harry Houdini? received mostly positive reviews from contemporary music critics. At Metacritic, which assigns a normalized rating out of 100 to reviews from mainstream critics, the album received an average score of 68, based on 12 reviews, which indicates "generally favorable reviews".

Dan Raper of PopMatters praised the album, stating, "Shiny pieces of melody peek out from the lush pop textures the band’s created all through Who Killed Harry Houdini?. In fact, the album keeps up songwriting quality at a surprisingly consistent level, taking a collective breath before barrelling into a series of fine tunes to close. From “Ophelia”’s awkward keyboard switches to the expansive, syncopated refrain of “Little Ghost”, this section of the disc feels like a nostalgic, triumphant encore. It’s not the last one this band will have demanded of them."

Marc Hogan of Pitchfork Media was more critical of the album, stating, "Houdini sounds like an attempt to escape from the predicament of the sophomore album, making more nuanced use of orchestration and sticking with a comfortingly sweet and naïve tone while also expanding its perspective. March-like first single "Paper Planes" has sunny guitars, whistling woodwinds, neighbors' sex, and "The Cosby Show", slyly invoking the way we pass unseen through the lives of strangers; free mp3 giveaway "Music Killed Me" adds a kiddie-psych spaceyness, using the choral vocal to full rhetorical advantage. "Andy" politely invites a guy—with the same name as one of my local bartenders!-- to join the band. But nothing here has the euphoric simplicity of "We're From Barcelona", or quite the infant-"Calvin & Hobbes" wisdom of "Chicken Pox" and "Treehouse"."

== Track listing ==
All tracks are written by Emanuel Lundgren.

No.	Title	Length
1.	"Andy"	3:30
2.	"Paper Planes"	3:01
3.	"Headphones"	2:48
4.	"Music Killed Me"	4:40
5.	"Gunhild" (featuring SoKo)	4:34
6.	"Mingus"	2:50
7.	"Ophelia"	2:38
8.	"Houdini"	2:41
9.	"Little Ghost"	2:59
10.	"Rufus"	7:09
Total length:		36:50
