= Yay! =

Studio album by Motorpsycho
- Released: June 16, 2023
- Genres: Psychedelic rock, progressive rock, alternative rock
- Length: 42:03
- Labels: Stickman Records, Det Nordenfjeldske Grammofonselskab
- Producers: Reine Fiske, Lars Fredrik Swahn

Motorpsycho chronology
Ancient Astronauts (2022)	Yay! (2023)	Neigh!! (2024)

Professional ratings
Aggregate scores
Source	Rating
Metacritic	(74/100)
Review scores
Source	Rating
AllMusic	4/5 stars
Sputnikmusic	4/5 stars

Yay! is a studio album by Norwegian rock band Motorpsycho, released on June 16, 2023, through Det Nordenfjeldske Grammofonselskab and Stickman Records. The album is available in vinyl, CD, cassette and digital download formats. It contains the last contribution of drummer Tomas Järmyr, leaving only two band members.

== Musical style ==
The album shifts considerably away from the past few records' relatively heavy progrock/psychedelic rock towards an acoustic guitar induced mellow psychedelia with influences of folk music, a genre the band has practiced in the past, though.

The cover art is inspired by the 1995 album Wowee Zowee of Pavement.

== Track listing ==
All tracks are written by Bent Sæther.

No.	Title	Length
1.	"Cold & Bored"	4:00
2.	"Sentinels"	4:21
3.	"Patterns"	5:10
4.	"Dank State"	3:18
5.	"W.C.A."	4:15
6.	"Real Again (Norway shrugs and stays at home)"	3:02
7.	"Loch Meaninglessness & the Mull of Dull"	2:54
8.	"Hotel Daedalus"	7:46
9.	"Scaredcrow"	1:49
10.	"The Rapture"	5:28
Total length:		42:03

== Personnel ==
Motorpsycho

- Bent Sæther – lead vocals (1, 2, 4, 6–8, 10), background vocals (1–3, 5), acoustic guitars (1–10), Mellotron (1, 3, 5, 8–10), Wurlitzer (2), Omnichord (2, 7), bass guitar (3, 5, 8, 10), mandolin (7), engineering
- Hans Magnus Ryan – lead vocals (3, 5), background vocals (1–8, 10), acoustic guitar (1, 2), electric guitars (3, 5, 8, 10), slide guitar (3), engineering
- Tomas Järmyr – percussion (1–5, 7, 8, 10), congas (1–2, 5, 7, 8, 10), glockenspiel (1), background vocals (2, 4, 7), drums (3, 5, 8), gong (8), engineering

With

- Reine Fiske – electric guitar (1, 3, 5, 9), zither (1, 2, 4), violin (1, 10), ambiance (6), slide guitar (8), string arrangement (8, 10), acoustic guitar (9, 10), keyboards (10), producer
- Lars Fredrik Swahn – background vocals (1–5, 10), synth bass (1), synthesizer (3), keyboards (5, 8), ambiance (6), producer
- Josefin Runsten – violins & violas (8, 10)
- Lisa Maria Linnéa Isaksson – flutes, background vocals
- Helge Sten – mastering
