= Tio bitar =

Tio Bitar

Studio album by Dungen
- Released: April 23, 2007
- Genres: Psychedelic rock, progg
- Length: 42:34
- Labels: Subliminal Sounds (SE), Kemado Records (US), Dew Process (AUS), Vroom-Sound (JP)

Dungen chronology
Ta det lugnt (2004)	Tio Bitar (2007)	4 (2008)

Professional ratings
Aggregate scores
Source	Rating
Metacritic	79/100 link
Review scores
Source	Rating
Allmusic	link
Entertainment Weekly	A− link
The A.V. Club	A− link
Pitchfork Media	7.0/10 link
PopMatters	link
Stylus Magazine	A link
This Is Fake DIY	link

Tio Bitar ("Ten pieces") is the fourth album by the Swedish psychedelic rock group Dungen.

It was released as a CD on 23 April 2007, by Subliminal Sounds (Sweden), with a vinyl version to follow on the same label. The album was released in the US on Kemado Records on 15 May 2007, followed by releases on Vroom-Sound in Japan and Dew Process in Australia in June 2007.

== Track listing ==
No.	Title	English translation	Length
1.	"Intro"		3:47
2.	"Familj"	Family	5:45
3.	"Gör det nu"	Do It Now	3:07
4.	"C visar vägen"	C Shows the Way	4:32
5.	"Du ska inte tro att det ordnar sig"	You Shouldn't Expect it to Work Out	3:30
6.	"Mon Amour"	My Love	8:47
7.	"Så blev det bestämt"	So It Was Decided	4:01
8.	"Ett skäl att trivas"	A Reason to Enjoy	3:03
9.	"Svart är himlen"	The Sky Is Black	2:17
10.	"En gång i år kom det en tår"	Once This Year There Came a Tear	3:45
Total length:			42:34
