= I'm from Barcelona =

Swedish pop group

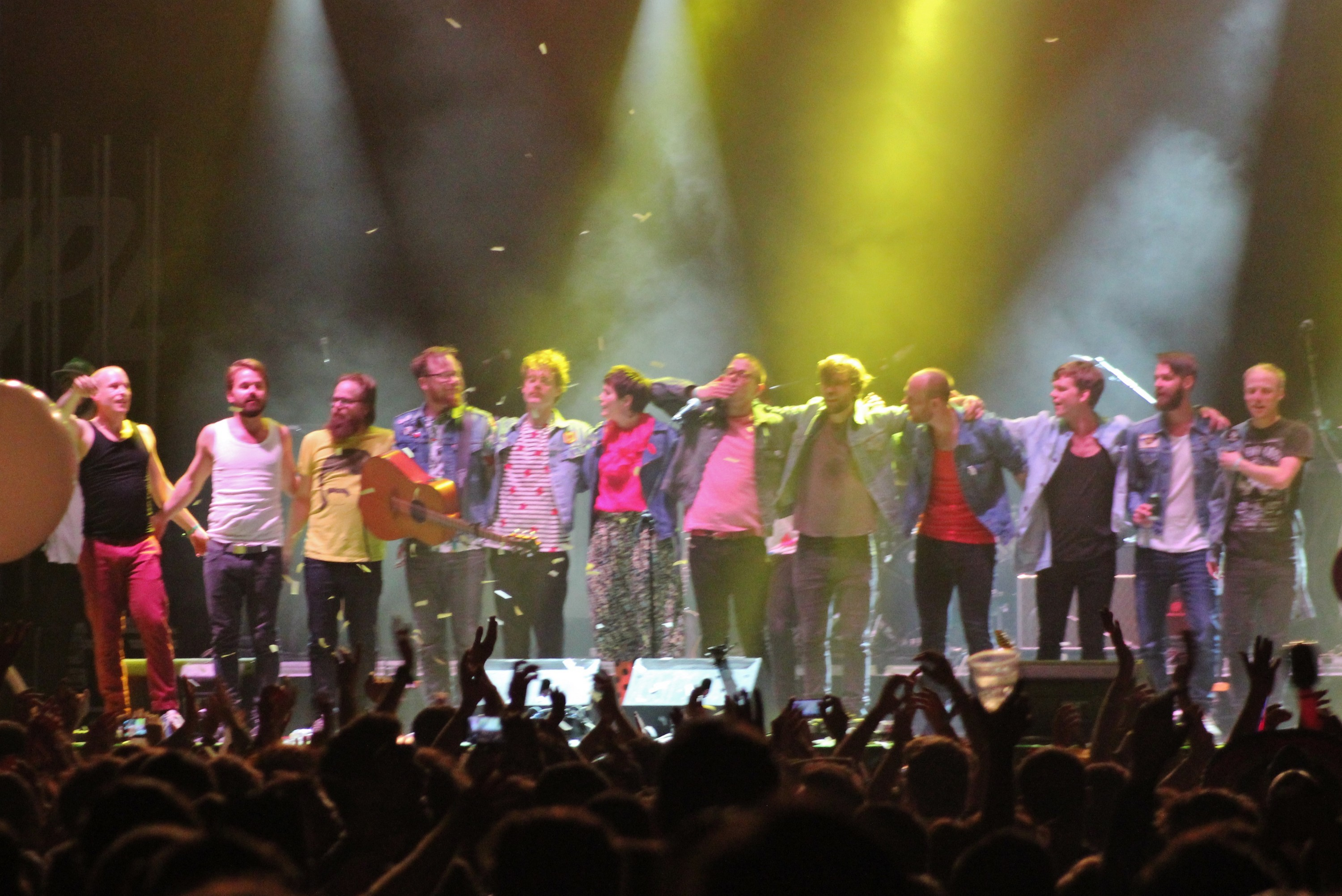
- I'm from Barcelona at Festival SOS 4.8 in Murcia, 2015.

Background information
- Origin: Jönköping, Sweden
- Genre: Pop
- Years active: 2005–present
- Labels: EMI Sweden; Dolores; Mute
- Members: Emanuel Lundgren; Frida Öhnell; Cornelia Norgren; Philip Erixon; Micke Larsson; Johan Mårtensson; Anna Fröderberg; Johan Aineland; Martin Lindh; Erik Ottosson; Tina Gardestrand; David Ljung; Christofer Lorin; Daniel Lindlöf; Mattias Johansson; Tobias Granstrand; Emma Öhnell; Mathias Alriksson; Jonas Tjäder; David Ottosson; Olof Gardestrand; Marcus Carlholt; Julie Witwicki Carlsson; Rikard Ljung; Henrik Olofsson; Jacob Sollenberg; Fredrik Karp; Johan Viking
- Website: www.imfrombarcelona.com

I'm from Barcelona is a Swedish pop group from Jönköping, Sweden, best known for its 29 band members and eclectic mix of instruments such as clarinets, saxophones, flutes, trumpets, banjos, accordions, kazoos, guitars, drums, and keyboards among others. While most band members provide backing vocals on releases and during live performances, Emanuel Lundgren is founder, principal songwriter and lead singer for the group.

In 2006 the band released an EP entitled Don't Give Up on Your Dreams, Buddy! as well as a full-length album, Let Me Introduce My Friends – both of which were well-received critically. Their second full-length album, Who Killed Harry Houdini?, was released in October 2008.

== History ==
Sometime in 2005, Emanuel Lundgren wrote several songs and gathered his friends to record them. Weeks later, a homemade EP was completed and a one-time live show featuring all 29 band members was performed in August 2005.

The band signed with EMI Sweden and Dolores Recordings, releasing the EP Don't Give Up On Your Dreams, Buddy! on February 15, 2006 featuring the band's first hit "We’re From Barcelona", named as an homage to the Spanish waiter Manuel, a character on BBC Television's Fawlty Towers ("He’s from Barcelona"). Their debut full-length album, entitled Let Me Introduce My Friends, was released on April 26, 2006 in Sweden, with international releases to follow including an EMI UK release on 11 September 2006.

In July 2008, it was announced that the band would be releasing their second full-length album in fall 2008, entitled Who Killed Harry Houdini? The album features French singer Soko on the track "Gunhild". The album was released on October 14, 2008, and they toured the UK to promote the album, finishing at the Scala, London on the 25th of November 2008.

They also made an appearance on the children's program Yo Gabba Gabba in 2008.

Their song "The Painter" appeared in the CBS television show How I Met Your Mother, in the episode "Everything Must Go", aired on May 12, 2008.

A version of their song "Get in Line" has been used in European adverts for Babybel cheese since 2012, whereby the band re-recorded the song with a children's choir.

== Members ==
- Johan Aineland (Accordion, Mandolin)
- Martin Lindh (Synthesizers, Glockenspiel)
- Mathias Alriksson (Vocals)
- Marcus Carlholt (Vocals, Costumes)
- Julie Witwicki Carlsson (Vocals)
- Mike Elio (Vocals)
- Philip Erixon (Percussion, Vocals)
- Anna Fröderberg (Vocals)
- Olof Gardestrand (Drums)
- Tina Gardestrand (Vocals, Piano)
- Tobias Granstrand (Guitar)
- Mattias Johansson (Saxophone)
- Fredrik Karp (Saxophone)
- Micke Larsson (Vocals)
- Daniel Lindlöf (Guitar, Banjo)
- David Ljung (Trumpet)
- Rikard Ljung (Omnichord, Synthesizers)
- Emanuel Lundgren (Lead Vocals, Guitar)
- Johan Mårtensson (Vocals)
- Cornelia Norgren (Vocals)
- Emma Öhnell (Vocals)
- Frida Öhnell (Vocals)
- Erik Ottosson (Tuba)
- Christofer Olofsson (Piano, Synthesizers)
- Henrik Olofsson (Bass)
- Jacob Sollenberg (Clarinet)
- Jonas Tjäder (Vocals)
- Johan Viking (Heart and Soul)
- Jakob Jonsson (Trumpet)

== Discography ==
=== Albums ===
Year	Album	Peak positions		
Year	Album	SWE	BEL (Vl)	FR
2006	Let Me Introduce My Friends	19	68	123
2008	Who Killed Harry Houdini?	–	–	186
2010	27 Songs from Barcelona	–	–	–
2011	Forever Today	–	–	–
2015	Growing Up Is for Trees	–	–	–

=== EPs ===
Year	Singles	Peak positions	Album
Year	Singles	SWE	Album
2006	Don't Give Up on Your Dreams, Buddy! (EP) (containing "We're from Barcelona" / "Treehouse" / "Ola Kala" / "The Painter")	12	Let Me Introduce My Friends

=== Singles ===
Year	Singles	Peak positions				Album
Year	Singles	SWE	BEL	FR	UK	Album
2006	"We're From Barcelona"	—	14	—	158	Let Me Introduce My Friends
2016	"Violins"	—	—	100	—	Growing Up Is for Trees

Other singles

- 2005: "Sing!!"
- 2006: "Collection of Stamps"
- 2006: "Treehouse"
- 2006: "Britney"
- 2008: "Paper Planes"
- 2008: "Mingus"
- 2011: "Get in Line"
- 2011: "Come On"
- 2011: "Always Spring"
- 2012: "Battleships"

== Music videos ==
- "Collection of Stamps" By Daniel Eskils & Johan Junker
- "We're From Barcelona" By Andreas Nilsson & Rasmus Hägg
- "Violins"

== Collaborations ==
- "Here We Come A-wassailing" on the Shrek the Halls movie soundtrack (2007).
- Kristoffer Ekstrand (Adventure Kid) made a remix of the band's We're From Barcelona which was played at the end of the band's shows during 2006.
- Loney, Dear
