= Forever Today =

Studio album by I'm from Barcelona
- Released: 19 April 2011
- Genres: Indie pop, baroque pop, folk rock, pop rock, indie rock
- Label: Mute

I'm from Barcelona chronology
27 Songs from Barcelona (2010)	Forever Today (2011)	Growing Up is for Trees (2015)

Professional ratings
Aggregate scores
Source	Rating
Metacritic	76/100
Review scores
Source	Rating
AllMusic	4/5 stars
Pitchfork Media	6.1/10

Forever Today is an album by the Swedish band I'm from Barcelona, released in 2011. At the time of the recording, the band was made up of 27 members.

== Critical reception ==
Paste wrote that "the whole thing plays like one long anthem, the score to an indie-pop opera." Exclaim! thought that "IFB's sound seldom feels crowded, often favouring a simple, but strong guitar or keyboard line to rally around, adding clever flourishes rather than competing melodies." The New York Times opined that the album "doesn’t suggest a collective venture so much as a well-upholstered solo project: less Broken Social Scene than the Polyphonic Spree."

== Track listing ==
1. "Charlie Parker" - 3:04
2. "Get in Line" - 3:09
3. "Battleships" - 3:18
4. "Always Spring" - 3:11
5. "Can See Miles" - 3:22
6. "Come On" - 2:54
7. "Skipping a Beat" - 3:00
8. "Dr. Landy" - 2:40
9. "Game Is On" - 4:41
10. "Forever Today" - 3:32
