= Sky City (album) =

Studio album by Amason
- Released: 20 January 2015
- Label: INGRID

Sky City is the debut studio album by Swedish band Amason, released through 20 January 2015 on INGRID.

== Recording ==
The album was recorded at Spegeln and INGRID studios in Stockholm, Sweden by Amason, Nille Perned, Christoffer Zakrisson and Gustav Lindelöw. All songs were written by Amason except "Elefanten", which was written by Amason and Jenny Palén. "Yellow Moon" was written and produced by Amason and Patrik Berger. The album was mastered by Bob Ludwig, Gateway Mastering Studios.

== Track listing ==
No.	Title	Length
1.	"Älgen" (The Moose)
2.	"Duvan" (The Dove)
3.	"Kelly"
4.	"Elefanten" (The Elephant)
5.	"Went to War"
6.	"NFB"
7.	"Velodrom" (Velodrome)
8.	"Yellow Moon"
9.	"Blackfish"
10.	"Pink Amason"
11.	"The Moon As a Kite"
12.	"Clay Birds"

== Charts ==
=== Weekly charts ===
Chart (2015)	Peak position
Swedish Albums (Sverigetopplistan)	12

=== Year-end charts ===
Chart (2015)	Position
Swedish Albums (Sverigetopplistan)	65
