= The Tower (Motorpsycho album) =

Studio album by Motorpsycho
- Released: September 8, 2017
- Genre: Psychedelic rock, progressive rock, alternative rock
- Length: 85:05
- Label: Stickman Records; Rune Grammofon
- Producer: Bent Sæther

Motorpsycho chronology
Here Be Monsters (2016)	The Tower (2017)	The Crucible (2019)

Professional ratings
Review scores
Source	Rating
Sputnikmusic	4.1/5 stars

The Tower is a studio album by Norwegian rock band Motorpsycho, released on September 8, 2017, through Stickman Records and Rune Grammofon. This is the first installment in the band's Gullvåg Trilogy with the second installment being 2019's The Crucible and the third and final installment being 2020's The All Is One. The album is available as double vinyl, double CD and a digital download.

The album was nominated for the best rock album at the 2017 Spellemannprisen.

== Track listing ==
All tracks are written by Bent Sæther, except where noted.

Disc one
No.	Title	Writer(s)	Length
1.	"The Tower (incl. The Wishboner)"	Hans Magnus Ryan, Sæther	8:44
2.	"Bartok of the Universe"	Ryan, Sæther	6:08
3.	"A.S.F.E"		6:53
4.	"Intrepid Explorer"		9:52
5.	"Stardust"		3:34
6.	"In Every Dream Home" (there's a dream of something else)		8:35
Total length:			43:33

Disc two
No.	Title	Writer(s)	Length
1.	"The Maypole (incl. Malibu and Stunt Road)"		3:39
2.	"A Pacific Sonata"	Ryan, Sæther	15:30
3.	"The Cuckoo"	Ryan, Sæther	7:29
4.	"Ship of Fools"	Ryan, Sæther	14:41
Total length:			41:19

== Personnel ==
Motorpsycho

- Bent Sæther – bass, vocals, guitars, keyboards
- Hans Magnus Ryan – guitars, vocals, keyboards
- Tomas Järmyr – drums, percussion, vocals

Additional musicians

- Alain Johannes – vocals (3), messenger guitar (4, 7), cigar box guitar (4) flute (6)
