= College circuit =

Form of motion picture distribution

College circuit is a form of motion picture distribution where old films as well as new ones are shown on college campuses, usually in the evening. The selections range from art house fare to wide release films and cult classics (also see midnight movies for a similar practice).

== Origins ==
Beginning in the 1950s and 1960s, classes in cinema theory and history began to be taught at colleges across the United States. To facilitate the growing interest in film, prints were screened for a reduced price for students. Several movies have been salvaged thanks to this practice, including most notably Citizen Kane.

== Criticisms ==
Some of the movies popular on college circuits throughout the years have been either controversial, or of specious artistic merit. The content of the movies often appeal to college-age sensibilities.

Critics like Roger Ebert have expressed suspicion of such films when deemed "artistic", and instead charges them as misleading by presenting exploitive material (such as sex, violence, and drug use) by means that are more aesthetically-pleasing to those educated in cinema studies, and therefore they become more acceptable to an "intellectual audience". This is an argument sometimes leveled against Blue Velvet or the ouvre of Ken Russell.
