= Motorpsychos =

Heavy rock band

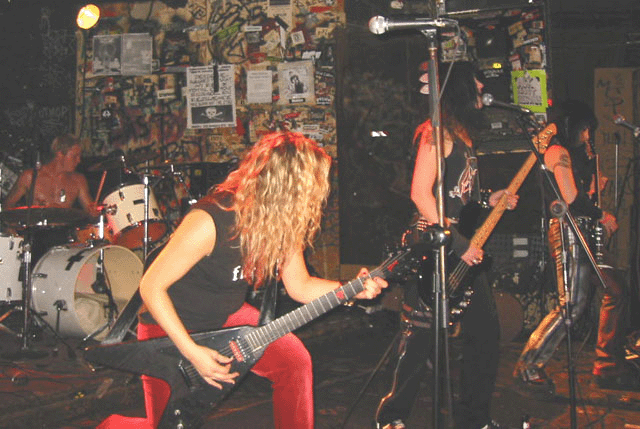
- The Motorpsychos performing at CBGB, 2004 (L-R: Dennis Brown, Abby Krizner, Amy Bianco, Pamela Simmons)
- Past members: Amy Bianco; Pamela Simmons; Dennis Brown; Abby Krizner; Rachel Cassady; Tom Venturino
- Website: Official website

Motorpsychos were a heavy rock band from Pittsburgh, Pennsylvania. They released four albums and won several regional and national band competitions, and consisted of longtime members Pamela Simmons, Amy Bianco, and Dennis Brown.

== Biography ==
Motorpsychos were formed in Pittsburgh in 2000 by guitarist Pamela Simmons and singer Rachel Cassady, both formerly of the band Go To Helen. Rounding out the original lineup were bassist Amy Bianco, also of the Pittsburgh hardcore ensemble Reducer, and drummer Tom Venturino. Shortly before the band recorded its debut album, Venturino departed and was replaced by Dennis Brown. The band became one of the most successful rock groups in Pittsburgh and toured throughout the northeastern United States. The self-titled album Motorpsychos was released in June 2002.

Cassady unexpectedly left the band in late 2003. Instead of merely recruiting a new lead vocalist, Motorpsychos decided to expand their sound by adding singer/guitarist Abby Krizner (formerly of Throttle Audio). Bianco and Simmons took on lead vocal duties as well, resulting in a unique three-frontwoman lineup. This expanded version of Motorpsychos debuted in January 2004 and quickly began accumulating accomplishments, including a first-place finish in the Rolling Rock Hard & Heavy Rock Wars in 2004. Their second album Piston Whipped, recorded with prize money, was released in January 2005 and featured Bianco, Simmons, and Krizner all singing lead on alternating tracks. Following the album's release, the band placed strongly in several national rock competitions, becoming finalists in the 2005 Zippo Hot Tour Competition and winning the 2005 K-Rock, Hard Rock Winter Rock Challenge, a competition with 107 other bands. Motorpsychos were also awarded with slots on the WXDX X-Fest in 2005 and the Warped Tour in 2005 and 2006.

The band's third album, Coming of Rage, was released on January 31, 2009. The album was recorded about a year earlier, in late 2007 and early 2008, but the release was delayed while the band investigated record company offers for distribution and promotion. The band eventually released the album independently. Krizner departed shortly thereafter, and the band continued as a trio. Their fourth album, Sheppard's File, was released on May 19, 2012.

== Discography ==
- Motorpsychos (2002)
- Piston Whipped (2005)
- Coming of Rage (2009)
- Sheppard's File (2012)
