= The Stomachmouths =

Swedish garage punk band

- Origin: Stockholm, Sweden
- Genres: Garage rock, garage punk, indie rock, punk rock, rock and roll
- Years active: 1984–1987
- Labels: Got to Hurry, Voxx, Subliminal Sounds
- Past members: Stefan Kéry; Martin Skeppholm; Lars Kjellen; Pär Stavborg; Anna Nyström; Jens Lindberg

The Stomachmouths were a Swedish garage punk band from Stockholm active in the 1980s. Formed in 1984, they were one of the earliest 'pure' garage bands in the European garage revival of the 1980s. Along with local colleagues the Crimson Shadows they pioneered the notion of a garage punk band that strove for authenticity in replicating the sound and the look of the original '60s inspirators, primarily from the US. The Stomachmouths received immediate international attention with their self-released debut 45, which raised interest on the independent music scenes in England and the US. The band toured extensively in Europe, appearing on German television and receiving major newspaper coverage in Italy.

Originally a quartet, Anna Nystrom joined the band in 1985. In 1987, Kjellen and Stavborg left to form the Livingstones. Jens Lindberg, formerly of the Crimson Shadows and High-Speed V joined as a replacement bass player for the last recordings and European tours. Band leader Stefan Kéry later went on to form the successful independent Xotic Mind/Subliminal Sounds record label.

== Members ==
- Stefan Kery, vocals/guitar
- Martin Skeppholm, drums
- Lars Kjellen, guitar
- Par Stavborg, bass
- Anna Nystrom, organ
- Jens Lindberg, bass (1987)

== Discography ==
=== LPs ===
- Something Weird (1986, Got to Hurry Records 101)
- In Orbit (1987, Got to Hurry Records 102)

=== Singles ===
- This Is..... 7-inch single (1985, Sunlight Records, 196025-01)
- I'm Going Away 7-inch EP, (1986, Got to Hurry Records 201)

=== Compilations ===
- Wild Trip 12-inch LP (1987, Voxx Records 200.040)
- Born Losers CD (2003, Subliminal Sounds, SUBCD6/KOOKS CD008SS)

=== Compilation appearances ===
- "Something Weird", Glitterhouse Records, Declaration of Fuzz LP, RP 10663, 1986
- "That's Cool That's Trash", Blizzard Beat cassette, Straight from the Grroveyard magazine, 1987
- "Almost There", Dimensions Of Sound LP, Mystery Scene Records, MS 1001, 1987
- "Speed Freak", The Secret Team LP, Voxx Records, VXS 200.039, 1988
- "Ugly Me/Girl Now!" (live), Misty Lane Records, Weird Out! LP, MISTY 018, 1993
- "Dr. Syn", Be a Caveman CD, Voxx Records, 2000
