= Prog Archives =

Fan-based website about progressive rock

- Logo of Prog Archives
- Website type: Online music database
- Available in: English
- Advertising: Yes
- Commercial: Yes
- Registration: Optional and free
- Users: 62,949
- Launched: September 1, 2002; 24 years ago
- Current status: Live

Prog Archives is an online fan-based website with information on progressive rock bands and musicians. Teams evaluate whether the band or musician should be added to the website or not. As of the summer of 2014, the website had web pages on 8,671 bands and musicians, which has grown in 2023 to articles of about 70,725 albums from 12,157 bands and artists, as well as more than 1.9 million ratings and reviews from 67,363 members. The website has regular and consistent reviews, biographies and discographies of all bands and albums it considers to be from the progressive rock genre. It has also categorised 22 subgenres of progressive rock.

== See also ==
- List of online music databases
