= Dungen =

Swedish rock band

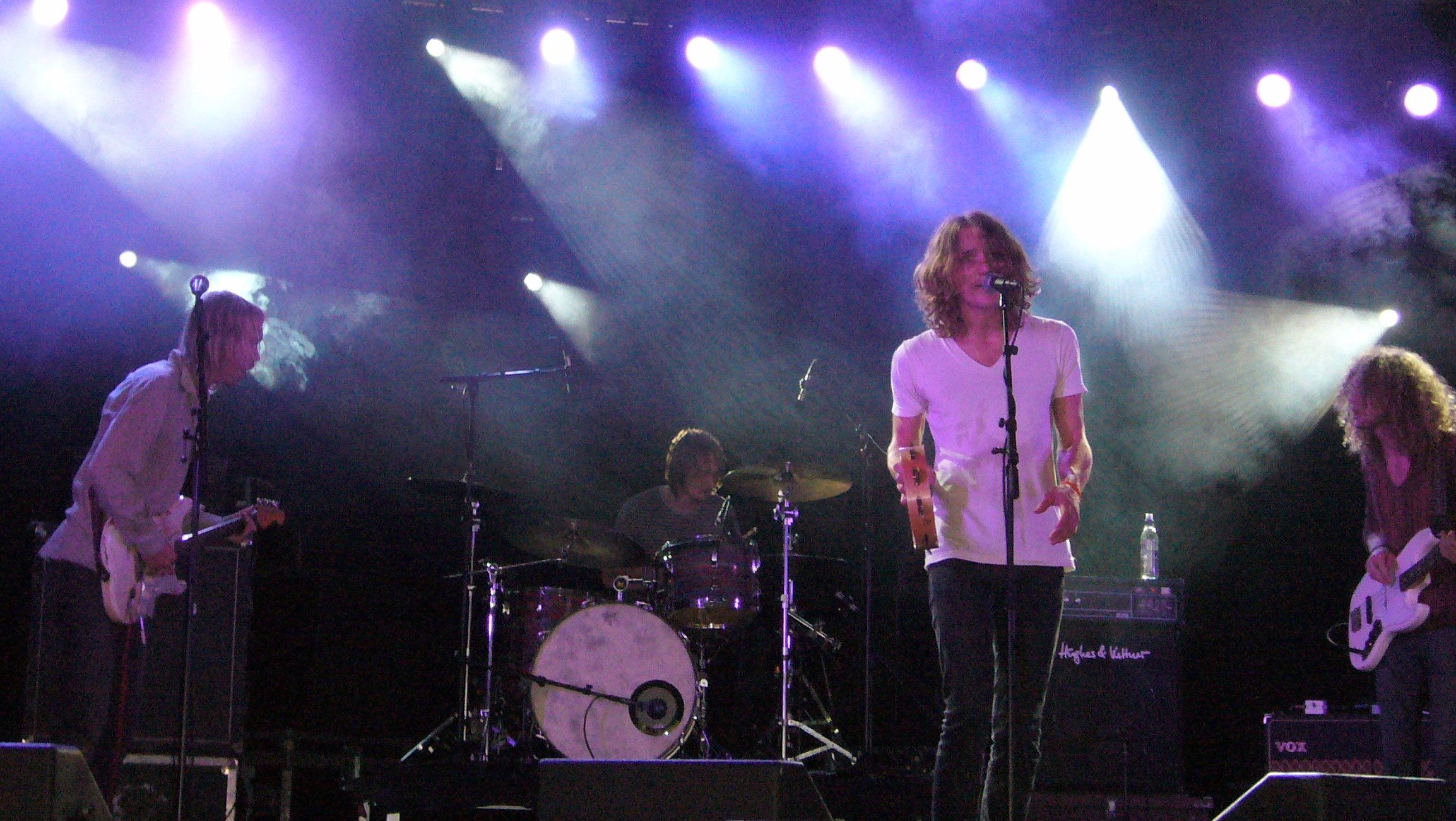
- Dungen performing at the Malmöfestivalen in Sweden in 2006

Background information
- Origin: Stockholm, Sweden
- Genres: Psychedelic rock; progressive rock; neo-psychedelia; jazz-rock
- Years active: 1999–present
- Labels: Subliminal Sounds (SE), Mexican Summer (US), Astralwerks (US), Memphis Industries (UK), Dew Process (AUS), Smalltown Supersound
- Members: Gustav Ejstes; Reine Fiske; Johan Holmegard; Mattias Gustavsson
- Past members: Fredrik Björling
- Website: www.dungen-music.com

Dungen ("the grove", Swedish pronunciation: [ˈdɵ̂ŋːɛn]) is a Swedish rock band based in Stockholm. Often classified as psychedelic rock, Dungen is also influenced by Swedish (and other) folk music, classic rock, progressive rock, garage rock and alternative rock.

The band is fronted by singer/composer Gustav Ejstes, who writes all music and plays the majority of instruments on the band's records. Live, Dungen plays as a four-piece. Ejstes, who in his teens started his songwriting with hip hop, is backed live by Swedish progressive rock veteran Reine Fiske on guitar, bassist Mattias Gustavsson, and drummer Johan Holmegard (who replaced Fredrik Björling), all of whom have played parts on Dungen's studio albums.

== History ==
Following two vinyl album releases on Swedish record label Subliminal Sounds, Dungen briefly signed to Dolores Recordings (a subset of Virgin Records) in 2002, on which they released the CD Stadsvandringar and three singles, including one for Djungelboken 2 (the Swedish version of The Jungle Book 2). Ejstes soon returned to his friend's independent record label Subliminal Sounds, stating that a major label did not feel right because Dungen is not a pop act.

Although Dungen's songs are sung entirely in Swedish, 2004's Ta det lugnt ("take it easy") received great acclaim within indie rock circles and established the band's international reputation. This resulted in the band headlining two US tours and landing distribution deals in the US and UK. Dungen also performed their song "Panda" on the television talk show Late Night with Conan O'Brien. Dungen played at the 2006 Bonnaroo Music Festival and toured with Wolfmother and the Tucker B's in Australia.

Dungen released their fourth studio album, Tio bitar ("ten pieces") on 25 April 2007 but did not tour in support of it.

The group's sixth studio album, entitled Skit i allt (~"f**k it all"), was released in 2010. The group played the ATP New York 2010 music festival in Monticello, New York in September 2010.

The group announced their seventh studio album on 23 June 2015, before releasing it on 25 September 2015. Entitled Allas Sak., the album title translates loosely into "everyone's thing" or "anyone's thing", though "sak" can also mean cause. Once again, the songs are sung largely in Swedish by Gustav Ejstes. "These songs are my everyday experiences, my thoughts and stories from the life I live," he said in a statement. "I hope people can create their own stories around the music and maybe we can make music together, the listener and I." The album was an international success, placing at no.14 on Australian publication Happy Mag's list of "The 25 best psychedelic rock albums of the 2010s" in October 2019.

Around 2014, the group undertook a project to create an instrumental score for the 1926 animated film The Adventures of Prince Achmed to be performed live with the film. They did so on several occasions in Sweden in 2014 and at the first Marfa Myths Festival in Marfa, Texas, United States. Inspired by what they created, the passed recordings to their producer Mattias Glavå with instructions to 'make it into a record'. The album was released on 25 November 2016 as an official Black Friday Record Store Day release and then re-released in a limited edition by Mexican Summer with a bonus 12" live EP recorded in Sol de Sants Studios after their show at Primavera Sound Festival in Barcelona. It was released in February 2017 to coincide with Dungen's US tour of art studios and small theaters performing the full score live accompanying the film.

== Discography ==
=== Albums ===
- Dungen (2001)
- Dungen 2 (2002)
- Stadsvandringar (2002)
- Ta det lugnt (2004)
- Tio bitar (2007)
- 4 (2008)
- Skit i allt (2010)
- Allas Sak (2015)
- Häxan (2016, Smalltown Supersound)
- Dungen Live (2020)
- En är för mycket och tusen aldrig nog (2022)
- Vidrig vår (2026)

=== EPs ===
- Ta det lugnt / Tyst minut (2005, Subliminal Sounds) (12" vinyl, also included with 2005 re-release of Ta det lugnt)
- Samtidigt (2009, Kemado) (limited-pressing (500) tour-only 12″ vinyl containing an extended 15-minute-long version of the song "Samtidigt" from 4)

=== Singles ===
- "Solen stiger upp" (2002, Dolores Recordings) (CD)
- "Stadsvandringar" (2002, Dolores Recordings) (CD)
- "Jag vill va' som du / Har du vart' i Stockholm?" (2003, Dolores Recordings) (CD)
- "Panda" (|2005, Memphis Industries) (CD, 7" vinyl) (#168 United Kingdom)
- "Festival" (2006, Memphis Industries) (7" vinyl)
- "Sätt att se" (|2008, Mexican Summer) (12" vinyl)
- Öga, näsa, mun (2011, Third Man Records) (7" vinyl)

=== Compilations ===
- Who Will Buy These Wonderful Evils (2002, Dolores Recordings)
- Mojo Presents Dave Gilmour & Friends (2015, Mojo Magazine)
