= Dolores Recordings =

Swedish record label

Dolores Recordings is a Swedish record label owned by Telegram Studios, whose roster includes I'm from Barcelona, Swingfly, Caesars, and some releases by The Soundtrack of Our Lives and Dungen.

In May 2021, Dolores was acquired by Round Hill Music.

== See also ==
- List of record labels
