= Reine Fiske =

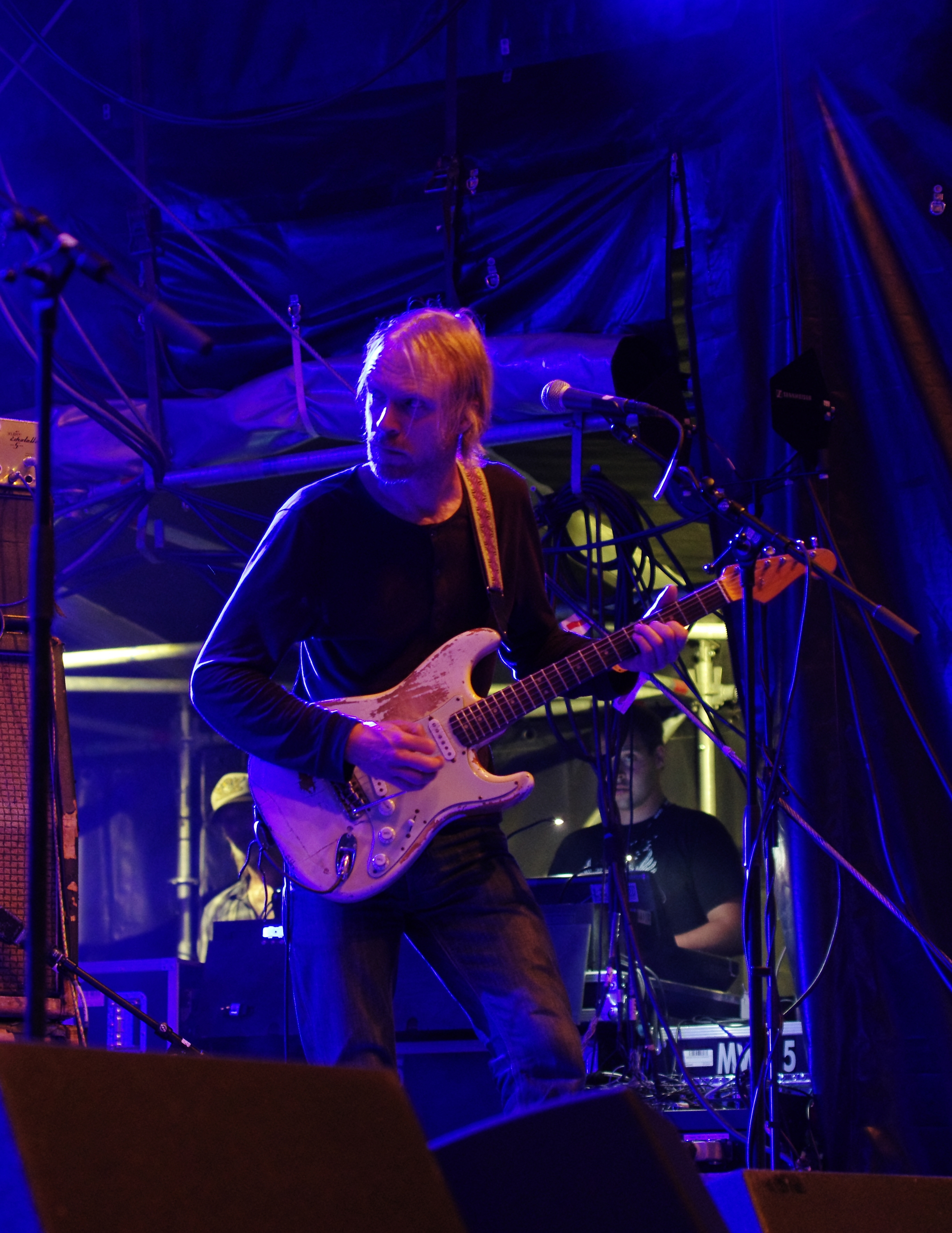
- Fiske with Motorpsycho live at Krach Am Bach 2013

Background information
- Born: Nils Reine Fiske; 4 October 1972 (age 53); Saltsjö-Boo, Sweden
- Origin: Sweden
- Genres: Prog-rock
- Occupations: Musician, art director, sound engineering
- Instruments: Guitar, bass guitar, percussion, vocals
- Labels: Subliminal Sounds

Nils Reine Fiske (born 4 October 1972) is a Swedish guitarist, art director and sound engineer at the record label Subliminal Sounds, who put his signature to many prog-rock projects such as Landberk, Morte Macabre, Paatos, Motorpsycho, Elephant9, and Träd, Gräs & Stenar. He is best known for his playing in the band Dungen.

== Career ==
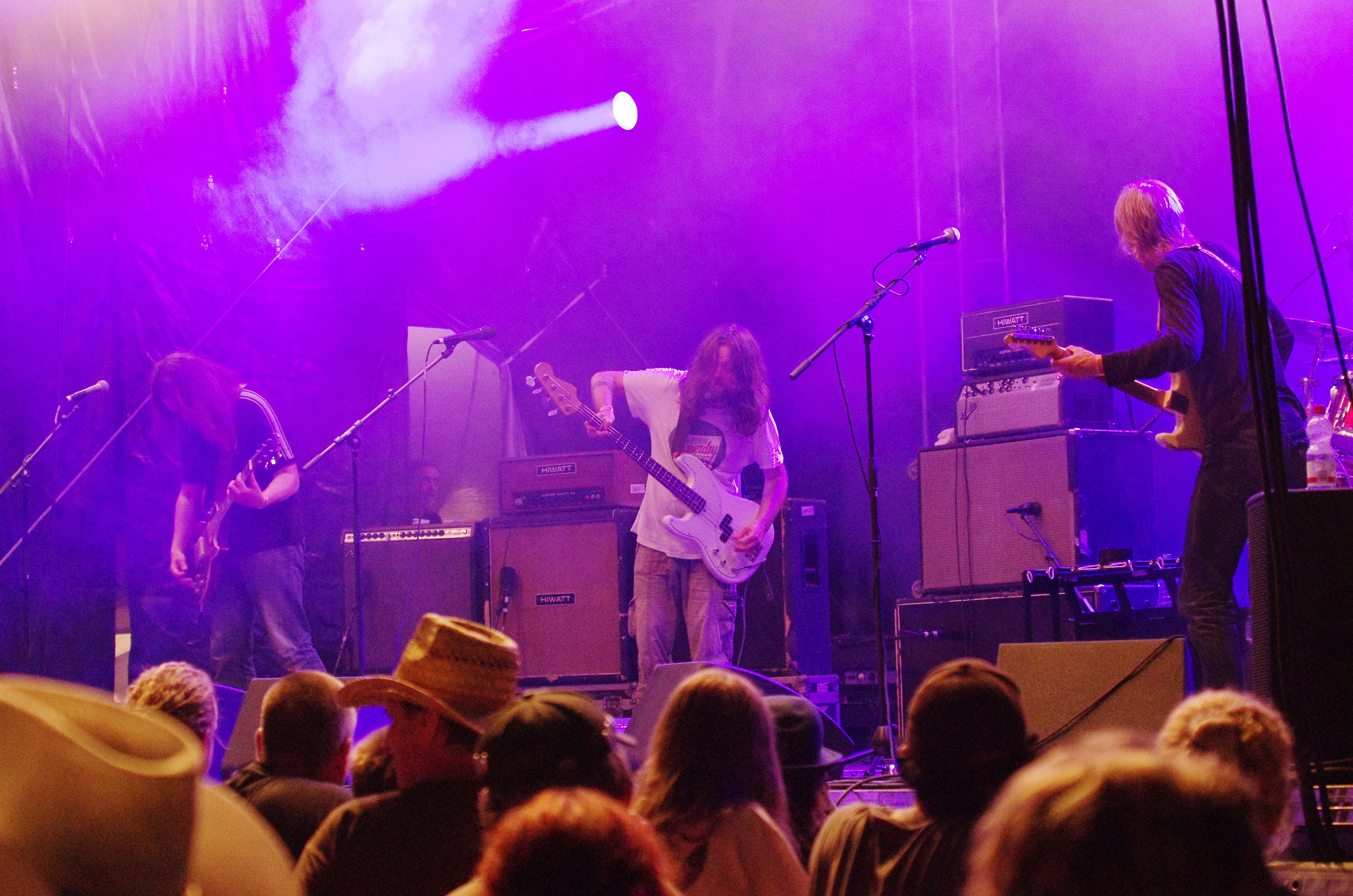
Hans Magnus Ryan, Bent Sæther and Fiske with Motorpsycho liveKrach Am Bach 2013

Fiske was born in Saltsjö-Boo, Sweden. He plays in The Amazing with Christopher Gunrup, has also played with the band Reform, and is a member of Sylvester Schlegel's band The Guild, in addition to those already mentioned.

In 2013 he released Still Life With Eggplant with the Norwegian prog-rock band Motorpsycho, followed by Behind the Sun in 2014 with the same band. He still tours regularly with them up to now (date 2025). With another Norwegian prog-rock band, Elephant9, comprising the trio Ståle Storløkken, Nikolai Eilertsen and Torstein Lofthus he released Atlantis . The latter appeared at Kongsberg Jazz Festival 2012.

He is a member of Träd, Gräs & Stenar.

== Discography ==
With Landberk

- Lonely Land (The Laser's Edge, 1992)
- One Man Tell's Another (Megarock Records, 1994)
- Riktigt Äkta (Record Heaven Music, 1995)
- Unaffected (Melodie & Dissonanze, 1995)
- Indian Summer (Musea, 1996)

With Morte Macabre

- Symphonic Holocaust (Musea, 1998)

With Paatos

- Timeloss (Stockholm Records, 2002)

With Dungen

- Stadsvandringar (Dolores Recordings, Virgin Records, 2002)
- Ta Det Lugnt (Subliminal Sounds, 2004)
- Dungen: 1999–2001 (Subliminal Sounds, 2005), compilation
- Panda (Memphis Industries, 2005)
- Tio Bitar (Subliminal Sounds, 2007)
- Sätt Att Se (Subliminal Sounds, 2008)
- 4 (Subliminal Sounds, 2008)
- Skit I Allt (Subliminal Sounds, 2010)
- Öga, Näsa, Mun (Third Man Records, 2011)
- Allas Sak (2015)
- Häxan (2016)

With S.T. Mikael

- Mind of Fire (Subliminal Sounds, 2007)

With Anna Järvinen

- Jag Fick Feeling (Häpna, 2007)
- Man Var Bland Molnen (Häpna, 2009)
- Anna Själv Tredje (Stranded Rekords, Universal Music, 2011)

With The Guild

- The Golden Thumb (2009)

With Träd, Gräs och Stenar

- Hemlösa Katter / Homeless Cats (Gåshud, 2009)
- Träden (Gåshud / Subliminal Sounds, 2019)

With The Amazing

- The Amazing (Subliminal Sounds, 2009)
- Wait for a Light to Come (Subliminal Sounds, 2010)
- Gentle Stream (Subliminal Sounds, 2011)
- Picture You (Partisan Records, 2015)

With Elephant9

- Atlantis (Rune Grammofon, 2012)
- Silver Mountain (Rune Grammofon, 2015)

With Motorpsycho

- Still Life With Eggplant (Rune Grammofon, 2013)
- Behind The Sun (Rune Grammofon, 2014)
