= Subliminal Sounds =

- Founded: 1989
- Genre: Psychedelic rock, Indie rock, Garage rock, Progressive rock, Folk rock
- Country of origin: Sweden
- Location: Stockholm
- Official website: www.subliminalsounds.se

Subliminal Sounds is a Swedish record label founded in 1989, based in Stockholm.

== Artists ==
- Bo Axelzon & His Exotic Sounds
- Baby Grandmothers
- Backdoor Men
- Dungen
- Entheogens
- Merrell Fankhauser
- Peter Grudzien
- D.R. Hooker
- Abner Jay
- Jade Stone & Luv
- Kebnekajse
- Life on Earth!
- Lisa o Piu
- LSD
- Attileo Mineo
- Mylla
- Pärson Sound
- Åke Sandin
- S.T. Mikael
- Stefan
- The Stomachmouths
- Tonebenders
- Träd, Gräs & Stenar
- The Works
- Tom Zacharias

== See also ==
- List of record labels
