= Morals and Dogma (album) =

Studio album by Deathprod
- Released: February 23, 2004
- Recorded: 1994, 1996, 2000
- Genre: Dark ambient, noise, drone
- Length: 48:49
- Label: Rune Grammofon

Deathprod chronology
Nordheim Transformed (1998)	Morals and Dogma (2004)	Deathprod (2004)

Professional ratings
Review scores
Source	Rating
Allmusic	4/5 stars
Pitchfork	(8.3/10)

Morals and Dogma is the third studio album (and fourth overall) by ambient noise artist Deathprod. It was released the same day as Deathprod's self-titled compilation which included three previous albums and Morals and Dogma. Release includes older material: track 2 was recorded in 1994, track 3 in 1996 while remaining in 2000.

In 2016, Pitchfork Media ranked it #50 on their list of the 50 Best Ambient Albums of All Time.

== Track listing ==
No.	Title	Length
1.	"Tron"	11:07
2.	"Dead People's Things"	18:35
3.	"Orgone Donor"	8:05
4.	"Cloudchamber"	11:02

== Personnel ==
Taken from:

- Composition – Hans Magnus Ryan (tracks: 3), Helge Sten (tracks: 1, 2, 4), Ole Henrik Moe (tracks: 3)
- Engineering, Mastering – Helge Sten
- Production – Deathprod
- Sleeve design – Helge Sten, Kim Hiorthøy
- Violin, Harmonium – Hans Magnus Ryan (tracks: 2, 3)
- Violin, Saw – Ole Henrik Moe (tracks: 1, 3, 4)
