= Deathprod (album) =

Box set by Deathprod
- Released: 23 February 2004
- Genre: Ambient, noise
- Length: 185:35
- Label: Rune Grammofon

Deathprod chronology
Morals and Dogma (2004)	Deathprod (2004)	6-Track (2006)

Professional ratings
Review scores
Source	Rating
Allmusic	3/5 stars
BBC Music	(favorable)
Boomkat	(favorable)
Dusted	(favorable)
The Milk Factory	5/5 stars

Deathprod is a box set by ambient noise artist Deathprod. It contains four discs, three of which are Deathprod's earlier albums with the first disc containing previously unreleased and rare material.

== Track listing ==
Disc One: Reference Frequencies
No.	Title	Length
1.	"Reference Frequencies #3"	3:25
2.	"6:15"	8:04
3.	"Recording the Jürg Mager Trio: La luna"	4:18
4.	"Recording the Jürg Mager Trio: A Shortcut to the Stars"	5:49
5.	"Reference Frequencies #7"	10:33
6.	"Reference Frequencies #8"	6:39
7.	"Reference Frequencies #5"	1:30
8.	"Dora 3"	5:01

Disc Two: Treetop Drive
No.	Title	Length
1.	"Treetop Drive 1"	14:51
2.	"Treetop Drive 2"	9:35
3.	"Treetop Drive 3"	9:32
4.	"Towboat"	18:12

Disc Three: Imaginary Songs from Tristan da Cunha
No.	Title	Length
1.	"Burntwood"	2:20
2.	"Stony Beach"	2:19
3.	"Hotentott Gulch"	1:51
4.	"Boatharbour Bay"	2:09
5.	"The Contraceptive Briefcase II"	30:38

Disc Four: Morals and Dogma
No.	Title	Length
1.	"Tron"	11:07
2.	"Dead People's Things"	18:35
3.	"Orgone Donor"	8:05
4.	"Cloudchamber"	11:02
