= Hanoi Rocks discography =

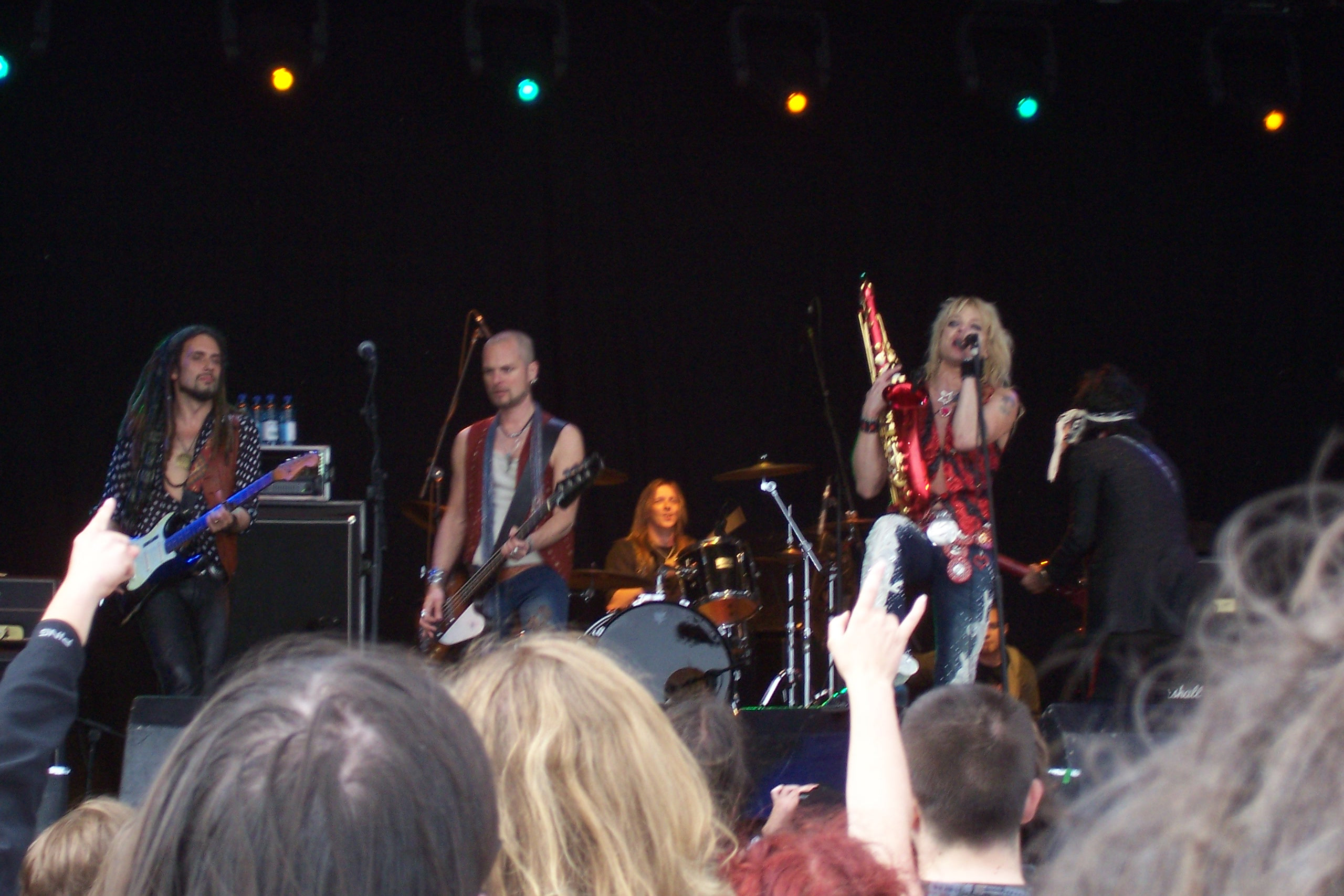
Hanoi Rocks in 2005

This is a complete discography of the Finnish rock band Hanoi Rocks. The band have released eight studio albums throughout their career and sold approximately 1 million records worldwide.

== Albums ==
=== Studio albums ===
Title	Album details	Peak chart positions				Sales
Title	Album details	FIN	JPN	SWE	UK	Sales
Bangkok Shocks, Saigon Shakes, Hanoi Rocks	Released: February 1981; Label: Johanna Kustannus	14	—	—	—	
Oriental Beat	Released: January 1982; Label: Johanna Kustannus	3	90	—	—	JPN: 1,100
Self Destruction Blues	Released: August 1982; Label: Johanna Kustannus, Lick	28	—	—	—	
Back to Mystery City	Released: May 1983; Label: Johanna Kustannus, Lick, Nippon Phonogram	6	64	—	87	JPN: 3,150
Two Steps from the Move	Released: August 1984; Label: CBS	9	49	—	28	FIN: 25,000; JPN: 3,740
Twelve Shots on the Rocks	Released: 29 November 2002; Label: Major Leiden	5	27	—	—	FIN: 24,410; JPN: 26,664
Another Hostile Takeover	Released: 30 March 2005; Label: Major Leiden	5	51	—	—	JPN: 10,844
Street Poetry	Released: 5 September 2007; Label: Backstage Alliance	6	—	41	—	

=== Live albums ===
Title	Album details	Peak chart positions		Sales
Title	Album details	FIN	JPN	Sales
All Those Wasted Years	Released: 1984; Label: Johanna Kustannus, Lick, Nippon Phonogram	15	51	JPN: 3,450
Rock & Roll Divorce	Released: 1985; Label: Johanna Kustannus	12	—	

=== Compilations ===
- Million Miles Away (1984) (Japan only) (Japan: 3,930)
- Up Around the Bend, Super Best (1984) (Japan only)
- The Best of Hanoi Rocks (1985)
- Dead by Christmas (1986)
- The Collection (1989)
- Tracks from a Broken Dream (1990) (Japan: 11,370)
- Story (1990) (Japan only) (Japan: 3,810)
- Strange Boys Play Weird Openings 4-CD Box Set (1992) (Japan only)
- Lean On Me (1992) (Japan: 12,020)
- All Those Glamorous Years...Best of Hanoi Rocks & Michael Monroe (1996) (Japan only)
- Decadent, Dangerous, Delicious (2000)
- Hanoi Rocks 4-CD Box Set (2001)
- Up Around the Bend...The Definitive Collection (2004)
- Lightning Bar Blues – The Albums 1981–1984 (2005)
- This One's for Rock'n'roll – The Best of Hanoi Rocks 1980–2008 (2008)
- Ripped Off – Odd Tracks and Demos (2009) (Japan only)
- Strange Boys (2016)
- Mental Beat 1980–1985 (2016)

== Singles ==
Title	Year	Peak chart positions				Album
Title	Year	FIN	POL	UK	UK Ind.	Album
"I Want You"	1980	20	—	—	—	Self Destruction Blues
"Tragedy"	1981	—	—	—	—	Bangkok Shocks, Saigon Shakes, Hanoi Rocks
"Desperados"	1981	10	—	—	—	Self Destruction Blues
"Dead by X-Mas"	1981	6	—	—	—	Self Destruction Blues
"Love's an Injection"	1982	1	—	—	—	Self Destruction Blues
"Motorvatin'"	1982	—	—	—	—	Oriental Beat
"Malibu Beach"	1983	8	—	84	29	Back to Mystery City
"Until I Get You"	1983	20	—	—	—	Back to Mystery City
"Mental Beat"	1983	—	—	—	—	Back to Mystery City
"Up Around the Bend"	1984	4	—	61	—	Two Steps from the Move
"Underwater World"	1984	—	—	82	—	Two Steps from the Move
"Don't You Ever Leave Me"	1984	—	6	92	—	Two Steps from the Move
"People Like Me"	2002	1	—	—	—	Twelve Shots on the Rocks
"In My Darkest Moment"	2003	—	—	—	—	Twelve Shots on the Rocks
"A Day Late, a Dollar Short"	2003	5	—	—	—	Twelve Shots on the Rocks
"Keep Our Fire Burning"	2004	2	—	—	—	Non-album single
"Back in Yer Face"	2005	—	—	—	—	Another Hostile Takeover
"You Make the Earth Move"	2005	—	—	—	—	Another Hostile Takeover
"Fashion"	2007	1	—	—	—	Street Poetry
"This One's for Rock'n'Roll"	2007	—	—	—	—	Street Poetry
"Teenage Revolution"	2007	—	—	—	—	Street Poetry
