= Buried Alive (video) =

Video by Hanoi Rocks
- Released: 18 November 2009
- Recorded: 12 April 2009; Tavastia Club, Helsinki
- Genre: Glam punk, hard rock
- Length: 2 h 50 min.
- Label: Backstage Alliance
- Director: Ykä Järvinen & Otso Tiainen
- Producer: Antti Kastari

Hanoi Rocks chronology
The Nottingham Tapes (1984)	Buried Alive (2009)

Professional ratings
Review scores
Source	Rating
Meteli.net	5/5 stars
Soundi	5/5 stars
Rumba	5/5 stars
Classic Rock	8/10 stars

Buried Alive is a concert music video by the Finnish rock band Hanoi Rocks. The video was recorded at the Tavastia Club in Helsinki of the band's final show. This is also the band's last release. The DVD spent eight weeks at number 1 on Finland's DVD charts.

Hanoi Rocks' founders, vocalist Michael Monroe and guitarist Andy McCoy, had announced that they had taken the band as far as they could and that they would end the band with 8 live shows at the Tavastia Club. The band's original rhythm guitarist Nasty Suicide appeared as a special guest on this (last show) and the three previous shows.

Besides the show, the video also features an exclusive behind the scenes-documentary of the last week with Hanoi Rocks (co-filmed by some of the members of the band).

This DVD is also the only Hanoi Rocks release to feature drummer George Atlagic.

== Track listing ==
1. "Tragedy"
2. "Motorvatin'"
3. "Boulevard of Broken Dreams"
4. "Street Poetry"
5. "Café Avenue"
6. "Obscured"
7. "Hypermobile"
8. "Fashion"
9. "Love's An Injection"
10. "Whatcha Want"
11. "Problem Child"
12. "Mental Beat"
13. "Underwater World"
14. "Power of Persuasion"
15. "A Day Late, A Dollar Short"
16. "I Can't Get It"
17. "Back to Mystery City"
18. "Until I Get You"
19. "Beer And Cigarette"
20. "Worldshaker"
21. "Don't You Ever Leave Me"
22. "11th Street Kids"
23. "Malibu Beach"
24. "High School"
25. "Travelin' Band"
26. "Taxi Driver"
27. "Lost in the City"
28. "People Like Me"
29. "Delirious"
30. "Oriental Beat"
31. "Million Miles Away"
32. "Up Around the Bend"

== Personnel ==
- Michael Monroe – lead vocals, harmonica, saxophone
- Andy McCoy – guitar, backing vocals, piano
- Conny Bloom – guitar, backing vocals
- Andy "A.C." Christell – bass, backing vocals
- George Atlagic – drums

=== Special guests ===
- Nasty Suicide – guitar, lead vocals on "Travelin' Band"
- Lacu – tambourine, backing vocals

== Chart position ==
Year	Chart	Position
2009	Finland's DVD Charts	#1
