= Keep Our Fire Burning =

2004 promotional single by Hanoi Rocks

Single by Hanoi Rocks
- B-side: "Heaven Is Gonna Be Empty"
- Released: 14 June 2004
- Genre: Rock; hard rock
- Length: 3:49
- Label: Major Leidén Productions
- Songwriters: Andy McCoy, Michael Monroe
- Producers: The Muddy Twins (Andy McCoy and Michael Monroe)

Hanoi Rocks singles chronology
"A Day Late, A Dollar Short" (2003)	"Keep Our Fire Burning" (2004)	"Back In Yer Face" (2005)

"Keep Our Fire Burning" is a single by the Finnish rock band Hanoi Rocks, released exclusively in Finland.

"Keep Our Fire Burning" is an old Hanoi Rocks song from 1983 that was never recorded on a release or played live. Guitarist Andy McCoy had originally written the song for a popular Japanese pop artist Yasuaki Honda, and for his album Angel of Glass. The song features lyrics dealing with love, and are different from on this release. The next time the song was released by Pelle Miljoona in 1996 under the name "Kaipaan sua" ("I miss you" in English), on his Hyvät pahat ja hitit 2 compilation, again with different lyrics. Pelle Miljoona recorded the song again a year later with a new band. This version also featured Andy McCoy on guitar.

When McCoy and Monroe reformed Hanoi Rocks in the early 2000s, Monroe found the song in a pile of old demo tapes, and wanted the reborn Hanoi Rocks to record it. Monroe and McCoy wrote new lyrics to the song, and McCoy changed the intro of the song a little.

The B-side of the single, "Heaven Is Gonna Be Empty", is a cover of the Pearl Harbour song. Neither of the songs were featured on the band's album Another Hostile Takeover, but were released to promote the album.

== Track listing ==
1. "Keep Our Fire Burning" – 3:49 (McCoy/Monroe)
2. "Heaven Is Gonna Be Empty" – 2:47 (Pearl Harbour)

== Personnel ==
- Michael Monroe – lead vocals, saxophone, guitar, percussion
- Andy McCoy – lead guitar, backing vocals
- Stevie Klasson – rhythm guitar
- Timpa Laine – bass
- Lacu – drums
- Pate Kivinen – piano

== Chart positions ==
=== Singles ===
Year	Single	Chart	Peak
2004	"Keep Our Fire Burning"		
2004	"Keep Our Fire Burning"	The Official Finnish Charts	2
