= The Nottingham Tapes =

Video by Hanoi Rocks
- Released: 10 June 2008
- Recorded: 23 April 1984
- Venue: Nottingham Palais, Nottingham, England
- Genre: Glam punk Hard rock
- Length: 60:00
- Label: Cherry Red (UK)

Hanoi Rocks chronology
All Those Wasted Years (1984)	The Nottingham Tapes (2008)	Buried Alive (2009)

Professional ratings
Review scores
Source	Rating
Record Collector	3/5 stars

The Nottingham Tapes is the second concert video released by the Finnish glam punk band Hanoi Rocks. The first video released by the band was All Those Wasted Years, recorded at the Marquee Club in London. As stated in the title, this video was shot at the Nottingham Palais in Nottingham England. The video was shot on 23 April 1984, almost eight months before the death of the band's drummer Razzle.

The video features songs that would later be released on the band's next album, Two Steps from the Move, such as "Underwater World", "Don't You Ever Leave Me" and the cover of "Up Around the Bend". During the performance of the last song of the set, the cover of the Ramones "Blitzkrieg Bop", vocalist Michael Monroe and Razzle switched places, so Razzle sang and Monroe played drums. While playing the song, fans jumped on-stage, and bouncers had to come and throw the people off the stage.

== Track listing ==
1. "Back to Mystery City"
2. "Up Around the Bend"
3. "I Can't Get It"
4. "Motorvatin'"
5. "Mental Beat"
6. "Boulevard of Broken Dreams"
7. "Don't You Ever Leave Me"
8. "Tragedy"
9. "Malibu Beach"
10. "Underwater World"
11. "Don't Follow Me"
12. "I Feel Alright" (The Stooges cover)
13. "Taxi Driver"
14. "Blitzkrieg Bop" (Ramones cover)

== Personnel ==
- Michael Monroe - Lead vocals, saxophone, drums (on "Blitzkrieg Bop")
- Andy McCoy - Lead guitar, backing vocals
- Nasty Suicide - Rhythm guitar, backing vocals
- Sami Yaffa - Bass, backing vocals
- Razzle - Drums, backing vocals, lead vocals (on "Blitzkrieg Bop")
