= People Like Me (song) =

Single by Hanoi Rocks

from the album Twelve Shots on the Rocks
- B-side: "Lucky" and "Winged Bull"
- Released: 22 April 2002
- Genre: Rock; hard rock
- Length: 2:56
- Label: Akashic Rocks
- Songwriters: Andy McCoy, Michael Monroe
- Producers: The Muddy Twins (Andy McCoy and Michael Monroe)

Hanoi Rocks singles chronology
"Don't You Ever Leave Me" (1984)	"People Like Me" (2002)	"A Day Late, A Dollar Short" (2003)

"People Like Me" is a single by the Finnish rock band Hanoi Rocks, and is the comeback-single of the band, who had broken-up in 1985. The single was certified Gold and reached number one on the Finnish singles chart.

"People Like Me" is the fruit of Andy McCoy and Michael Monroe's team-work and one of the biggest reasons for Hanoi Rocks' rebirth, was that McCoy let Monroe be an equal songwriter with him. Originally the song was one of the last demos by the original Hanoi Rocks before their drummer Razzle died in a car crash, but the song didn't get finished until 2002.

A music video was also made, which showed the band performing in the studio and live.

In Finland the song was also sold as a single, which featured "People Like Me", "Lucky", "Winged Bull" and a music video for the title-track. A promo-EP was also released in Finland which featured "People Like Me", "Lucky", "Delirious", "In My Darkest Moment" and the same music video as the single, but this EP was only meant for radio, clubs and other music distributors. Still, in Japan an EP was sold which featured the songs "People Like Me", "Lucky", "Delirious", "Are You Lonely Tonight" and the music video for "People Like Me". "Are You Lonely Tonight" wasn't featured on the original release of Twelve Shots on the Rocks, but is featured on the 2003 remixed version.

== Track listing ==
All tracks written by Andy McCoy and Michael Monroe, except where noted.

CD single (Akashic Rocks, Finland) (Victor Records, Japan):

1. "People Like Me" - 2:56
2. "Lucky" - 3:17
3. "Winged Bull" - 4:28
4. "People Like Me" (music video)

EP (Victor Records, Japan):

1. "People Like Me" - 2:56
2. "Lucky" - 3:17
3. "In My Darkest Moment" - 4:22
4. "Are You Lonely Tonight" - 3:09 (Willy DeVillen)
5. "People Like Me" (music video)

== Personnel ==
- Michael Monroe - Lead vocals
- Andy McCoy - Lead guitar
- Costello Hautamäki - Rhythm guitar
- Timpa Laine - Bass
- Lacu - Drums
