= Mogg =

Swedish rock band

- Origin: Umeå, Sweden
- Genres: Hard rock, glam metal, heavy metal, melodic rock
- Years active: 1981–1995
- Label: GMR Records

Mogg was a Swedish hard rock/glam metal band, formed in Umeå in 1981 as an Iron Maiden-influenced metal band. The name Mogg was invented to sound like "cool 1970s bands with long hair and flashy moustaches", a la Mud or Mott the Hoople. They split up in 1995.

== History ==
The core members were Thomas Carfors, Janne Eklund, and Mats Attaque. Thomas Broman left Mogg and joined the Swedish bands Great King Rat and the Electric Boys. Several other members were part of the different incarnations of Mogg between 1981–1995, including Yngwie Malmsteen drummer Bo Werner, Gotham City member bassist Björn Melander and Nocturnal Rites frontman, Jonny Lindqvist, who came from the band Arrows.

Mogg moved first to Stockholm in 1985 and then to Los Angeles in 1991, and released two albums and several singles during their career. They recorded their first album From the Ice Fields at Grandmaster Recorders Studios, in Hollywood, and also released a self-titled album, with more grunge rock influence before splitting up in 1995.

Mogg were somewhat successful in Sweden, toured a lot with among others Treat and Europe (band), played before an audience of 14 000 at an outdoor show in Kungsträdgården, Stockholm. Mogg were interviewed on the leading hard rock radio show in Sweden Rockbox in 1986.

During their time in Los Angeles, Mogg played shows at Coconut Teaszer, and Fm Station in North Hollywood, California. Their gig at the Fm Station was in January 1995. They opened for Killing Machine and Tracii Guns at the Fm Station, in 1993. They also recorded soundtracks for "adult movies" including one 1992 TV movie starring Shannon Tweed, wife of Gene Simmons from Kiss, until they finally went their separate ways back in Sweden 1995.

Thomas Carfors and Janne Eklund started a brand new band called Brassmonkey in 1998, also featuring John Norum bassplayer Anders "Nippe" Festader and released three albums that were met with positive reviews.

Mats Attaque is currently member of the band Beautiful Grey, who released the album Fine Forever in 2007.

On 21 January 2012 Mogg did a hometown reunion show at Scharinska in Umeå to favorable reviews in the local press

== Discography ==
=== Albums ===
- From the Ice Fields (1994, GMR Records GMR 1/520)
  - Track listing: "1. The traveller 2. Officer Brandon 3. Requiem to peace 4. Little bit longer 5. Bogus game 6. Dancing on the rocks 7. Lonely heart of mine 8. Evil genie 9. Bad boy boogie 10. One Thursday morning."

=== Compilations ===
- Rock I Umeå (1983, one Mogg song Loose You)
- Sommarrock 86 (1986, one Mogg song Fly Away)
- The Best Heavy Rock from Europe (1989, one Mogg song In and Out of Love)
- Pure Rock Search 90 Vol. 1 (1990, one Mogg song Striptease)

=== Singles ===
- "Fly Away" (1984)
- "Lay Down" (1986)
- "Power" (1986)
- "Shout" (1986)
- "I Don't Need You" (1986)
- "In And Out of Love" / "Please Don´t Call" (1987)

=== Demos ===
- "Replokalsinspelning" (Rehearsal recording) (1982) Songs: 1. Heaven is Waiting 2. Never Turning Back 3. Scratch My Back 4. Fire Down Under 5. Kiss My A**, Son of a B***h.
- "Demo" (1984) Songs: 1. Scratch My Back, 2. Turn up the Light, 3. Face to Face, 4. Burn You Up, 5. Heaven is Waiting
- "Mogg" (1986) Songs: 1. Today is no Tomorrow, 2. Power, 3. Heaven is Waiting, 4. Time to Die, 5. Fool in the City, 6. Shout it Out, 7. The End, 8. Breaking Up (My Heart)

=== Movie soundtracks ===
- "Sexual Response" (1992) (TV movie starring Shannon Tweed)

== Band members ==
=== Current ===
- Thomas Carfors – guitars
- Patrik Andersson – guitars
- Bobby (Eriksson) Valerie – bass
- Jan Eklund – drums
- Jonny Lindkvist – vocals

=== Former ===
- Björn Melander – bass (ex-Gotham City 1985–1988)
- Jonas Östman – drums (1986–1987)
- Thomas Persson – vocals (1988)
- Mats Attaque – vocals (ex- Tryckvåg 1988–1995)
- Bo Werner (Sundberg) – drums (ex- WC, Yngwie Malmsteen, 1992–1995)
- Thomas Broman – drums (ex-Tryckvåg, 1991?)
