= Pelle Miljoona =

Finnish musician (born 1955)

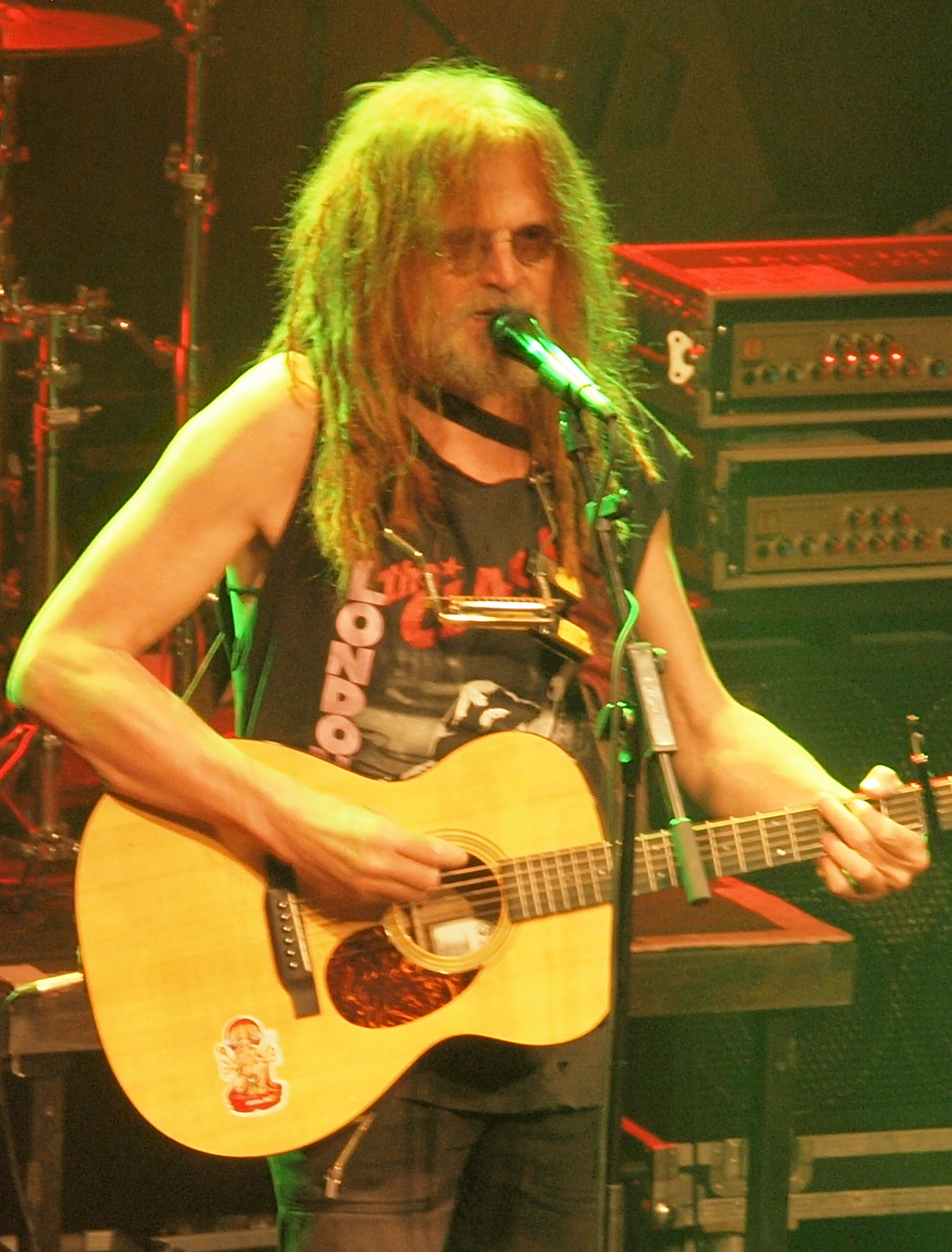
- Miljoona performing in 2016

Background information
- Born: Petri Samuli Tiili; 2 October 1955 (age 70); Hamina, Finland
- Genres: Punk rock, reggae, folk, folk punk, alternative rock
- Occupations: Musician, singer, songwriter, poet, author
- Instruments: Vocals, guitar, harmonica, drums

Pelle Miljoona (real name Petri Samuli Tiili) (born 10 February 1955) is a Finnish punk rock musician.

He was born in Hamina. The name "Pelle Miljoona" roughly translates to "Clown Million" or "Millionaire Clown," which reflects his mix of social critique and playful rebellion. He is also known as "The Godfather of Finnish Punk" in Finnish media. He is one of the most influential figures in Finnish punk, often credited with bringing punk rock to Finland in the late 1970s. He was part of the first wave of Finnish punk musicians in the 1970's. His sound has evolved over the decades, and he has also recorded reggae and acoustic folk songs. His musical influences include bands like The Clash, Sex Pistols, Stooges, and MC5, while Rolling Stones, Bob Dylan and Bob Marley have also been among his greatest inspirations.

Over the years, Pelle Miljoona has composed, written lyrics and sung in his many band line ups, including Pelle Miljoona & N.U.S, Pelle Miljoona & 1978, Pelle Miljoona & 1980, Pelle Miljoona Oy, Pelle Miljoona & Avoimet Ovet, Miljoonaliiga, Pelle Miljoona & Linnunlaulu, Pelle Miljoona & Rockers, Pelle Miljoona Unabomber!, and Pelle Miljoona United. Over his long career, Pelle Miljoona has published more than 30 albums and over 10 books. His lyrical themes often included anti-war messages, criticism of capitalism, and youth alienation. With a career beginning as a pioneer of the Finnish punk movement, he has left an important mark on Finnish culture.

== Career ==
Petri Tiili assembled his first band Pelle Miljoona & N.U.S in 1977. The first single Olen työtön (English: I am unemployed) was released the same year and the first album Pelle Miljoona & N.U.S was released in 1978. The band's name, N.U.S., was inspired by the American group The Fugs and has been interpreted to stand for either "Nuoriso Unohdettiin Saatana" ("The Youth Were Forgotten, Damn It") or "National Underground Society."

Finland, like many countries, was going through social and economic changes, and global tensions (such as the Cold War and Vietnam war) influenced Pelle's perspectives. With lyrics that mocked the Finnish army and the politics of the time, Pelle Miljoona gained significant attention when his early records were released, as such themes were unprecedented in Finland. Pelle performed as both singer and drummer in the band. After N.U.S., came short but significant lineups such as Pelle Miljoona & 1978 and Pelle Miljoona & 1980, which steered punk toward the sound of the new wave.

Pelle Miljoona & 1980 recorded albums at a rapid pace, releasing two studio albums, Pelko ja viha (Fear and hate) (1979) and Viimeinen Syksy (The last autumn) (1979), which includes the Finnish punk rock classic "Tahdon rakastella sinua," (I want to make love to you) and a live album, Näyttämökuvia (Stage pictures) (1980). By 1980, punk had already become mainstream in Finland, and Pelle Miljoona was emerging as one of the country's biggest artists.

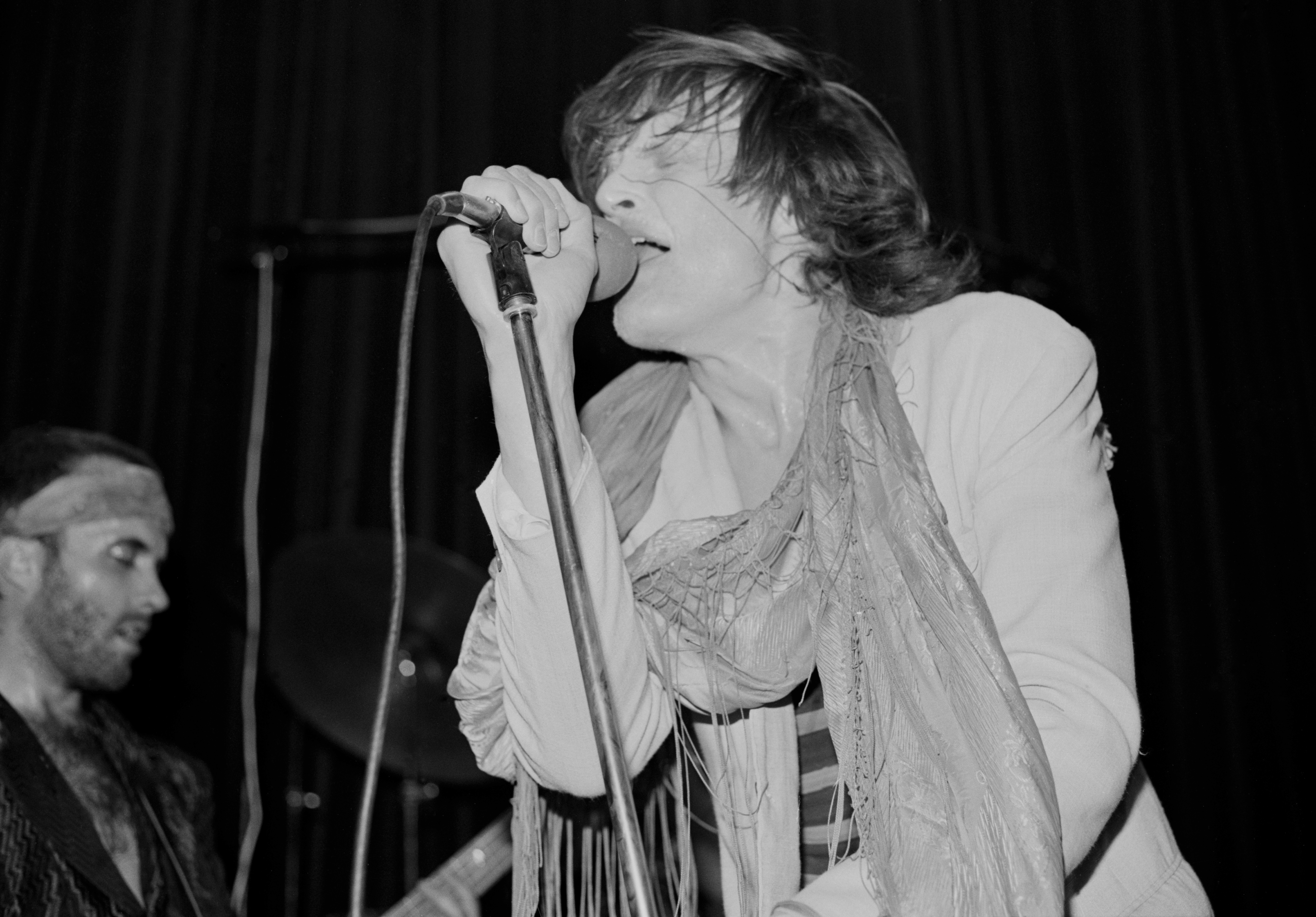
Pelle Miljoona on stage in the early 1980s

He achieved exceptional success with Pelle Miljoona Oy's album Moottoritie on kuuma (The freeway is hot) (1980), The iconic album is considered one of Finland's greatest rock albums of all time. The title track, "Moottoritie on kuuma," is a legendary Finnish rock anthem, symbolizing youthful rebellion and freedom. Musicians who played on that album included future Hanoi Rocks members Andy McCoy and Sami Yaffa. "Moottoritie on kuuma" album went platinum, and Pelle Miljoona Oy saw a bright future—until McCoy and Yaffa suddenly left the band to join Hanoi Rocks, just before Pelle Miljoona Oy's long tour in northern Finland. The classic lineup of Pelle Miljoona Oy then fell apart, and after that, the band became more or less a solo project for Pelle.

Although the mainstream punk movement faded, Pelle Miljoona continued making music, releasing albums and touring under different band names. While his sound evolved over the decades, his lyrics remained politically and socially engaged. The album Matkalla Tuntemattomaan (On the road to the unknown) (1981) was recorded in Germany's Hansa Tonstudio, a studio that had been used by artists such as Nina Hagen, Iggy Pop, and David Bowie.

In the 1990s, Miljoona focused mainly on traveling, visiting places like Goa, the USA, and Senegal. He was also involved in activism, often speaking out against social injustice, environmental destruction, and war. He also became known as a writer, publishing novels and poetry, and an autobiography. He has been described as "a still-kicking legend of beat literature." His autobiography, Elossa ja potkii! The elämäkerta (Alive and Kicking! The Biography, 2004), covers his entire life and career up to 2004, recounting his bands, albums, and touring life in Pelle's own words.

Pelle Miljoona's literary output is not merely a side project to his musical career but a profound extension of it, His books often include reflections on his journeys, blending travel writing with introspective musings on love, relationships and social commentary. He traveled extensively in Asia, and his experiences abroad influenced his worldview, music and writing.

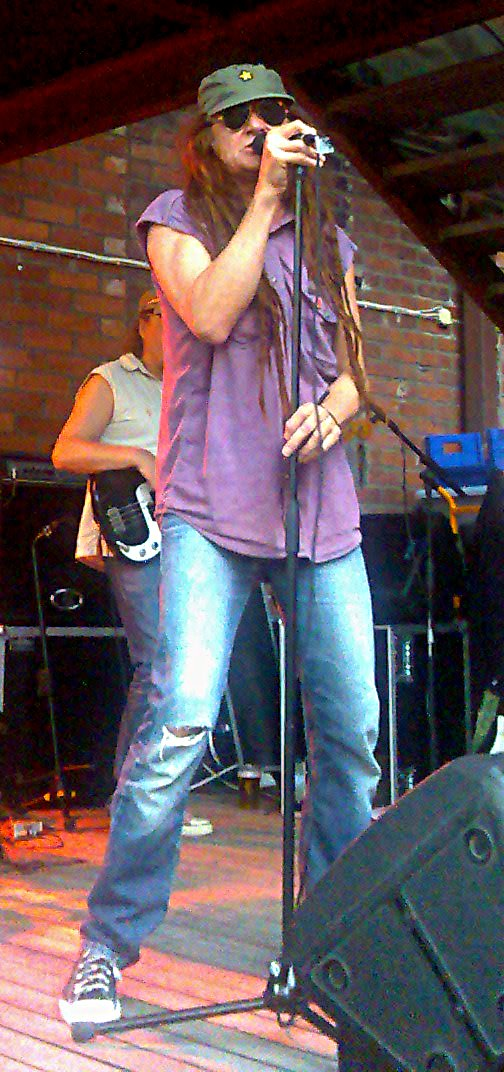
Pelle Miljoona in 2007

In 1999, the legendary club Lepakko in Helsinki was set to be demolished, and a farewell concert was held at the club with many Finnish artists. The American rock band Red Hot Chili Peppers happened to be performing in Finland the same evening and heard about the event. So the entire band, except for singer Anthony Kiedis, headed to Lepakko to join the party. Late at night, they also took the stage to jam, but since they didn't have their singer with them, Pelle Miljoona jumped on stage and started playing Bob Marley covers with RHCP.

Since 2000, Pelle Miljoona has toured doing acoustic solo shows and with punk rock bands. The pace of recording hasn't slowed down.

In 2018, Pelle Miljoona Oy did reunion shows in Finland with Andy McCoy and Sami Yaffa rejoining the line up. They recorded a new EP "Anna soihtusi palaa". The band also did a 40 years anniversary tour in 2018–2019.

=== Legacy ===
Pelle Miljoona is considered a cultural icon in Finland. His influence on Finnish rock is immense, as he paved the way for many later bands. The iconic Moottoritie on kuuma remains one of the most celebrated Finnish rock albums of all time. Even after decades in the music business, he remains active, performing and recording new material.

=== Awards and sculpture ===
Pelle was the recipient of the City of Helsinki Cultural Prize 2014. The City of Helsinki Cultural Prize is awarded annually by the Library and Cultural Committee. It is conferred on a Helsinki artist in recognition of notable artistic achievements or significant work to enrich Helsinki's cultural life He also received the Juha Vainio Award, which is awarded to Finnish lyricists, at Kotkan meripäivät festival in July 2015.

The statue of Pelle Miljoona, a Hamina-born rock legend, was made by artist Heimo Suntio in 2014. Outdoor sculpture is in Tervasaari, Finland just a short walk from the centre of Hamina. The sculpture commemorates Pelle Miljoona's long career as a musician.

== Discography ==
Pelle Miljoona & N.U.S.: Pelle Miljoona & N.U.S. (1978, Love Records); Pelle Miljoona & 1980: Pelko ja viha (1979, Love Records); Viimeinen syksy (1979, Johanna); Näyttämökuvia (1980, Johanna, live); Pelle Miljoona Oy: Moottoritie on kuuma (1980, Johanna); Matkalla tuntemattomaan (1981, Johanna); Radio Kebab (1982, Johanna. A.A.B. Tuotanto); Pelle Miljoona & Avoimet Ovet: Rakkaudesta elämään (1981, Johanna); Solo productions: Laulava idiootti (1983, Johanna, A.A.B. Tuotanto); Jos... (1984, Beta, Love Kustannus); Rauhan aika (1990, Pyramid); Kaikki muuttuu (1992, Pyramid); Goa Baba (2008, omakustanne); Kosminen keiju (2018, Stupido Records); Miljoonaliiga: Enkeltenkaupungissa... (1985, Pyramid); Pelle Miljoona & Linnunlaulu: Tule kotiin Johnny (1987, Pyramid); Sadepäivän ihmisiä (1989, Pyramid)	Pelle Miljoona & Rockers: Si Si Live (1992, Pyramid, live); ABC (1993, Pyramid); OK! (1994, Pyramid); Landella (1995, Pyramid); Juuret (1996, Pyramid); Kolmen tuulen pesä (1998, Pyramid); Brooklyn – Dakar (1999, Pyramid); Tee itselles elämä (2001, Pyramid); Villi lapsi (2002, Poptori); Tähtivaeltaja (2003, Poptori); Setä Samulin sirkus (2004, Stupido Records); Arambol (2006, Stupido Records); Tanssiva tuli (2020, Stupido Records); Pelle Miljoona & Ylivoima: Todistaja (2002, Wolfram Records); Pelle Miljoona Unabomber!: Unabomber! (2007, Stupido Records); Dharmapummi (2009, Stupido Records); Pelle Miljoona & JJU jousiensemble: Halki ajan ja rakkauden (2011, Fanfaari, Sound Of Finland); Pelle Miljoona United: Avara maa (2011, Stupido Records); Elävänä vastavirrassa (2013, Vastavirta-julkaisut); Diaspora (2013, KHY Suomen Musiikki); Kino Riviera (2015, KHY Suomen Musiikki); Olla joku (2017, Stupido Records)
