= Electric Boys =

Swedish rock/metal band

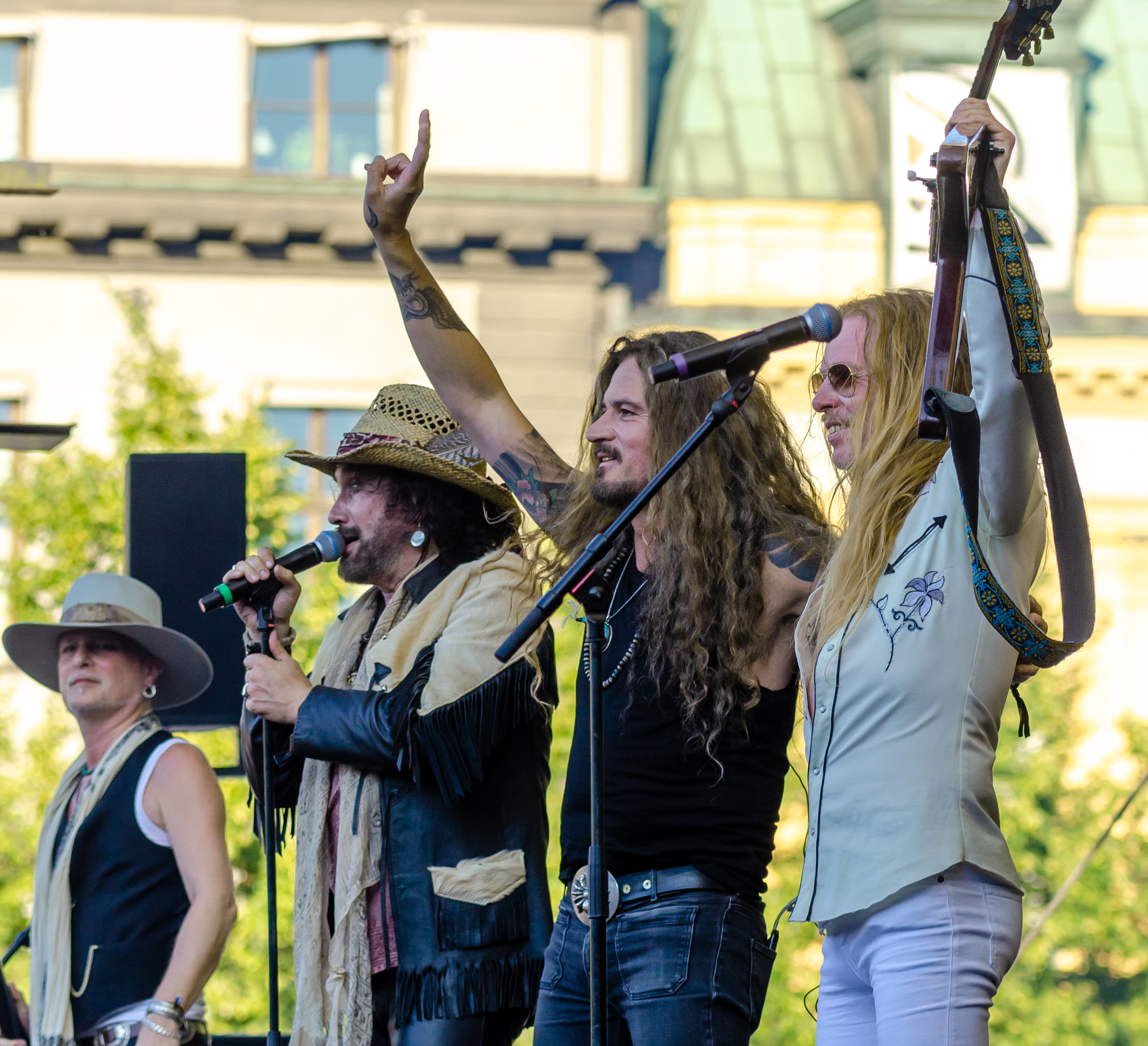

Background information
- Origin: Stockholm, Sweden
- Genres: Hard rock; funk rock; funk metal; glam metal
- Years active: 1987–1994, 2009–present
- Labels: Polygram; Atco; Music for Nations
- Members: Conny Bloom; Andy Christell; Martin Thomander; Jolle Atlagic
- Past members: Niklas Sigevall; Franco Santunione; Thomas Broman

The Electric Boys are a Swedish band founded in Sweden in 1987 playing funky hard rock with roots in the 1970s groove rock and 1960s pop and psychedelia.

== Career ==
They were formed by Conny Bloom (real surname: Blomqvist) (guitar/vocals) and Andy Christell (bass). Originally a duo, they signed for Polygram and released the single "All Lips 'n Hips" in 1987. This early version of what would become perhaps the band's best-known hit also appeared in America on the soundtrack to the movie Feds. The band then added second guitarist Franco Santunione and drummer Niclas Sigevall.

In 1989, the band's debut album Funk-O-Metal Carpet Ride, including “All Lips ’N’ Hips” was a success in Europe, and they picked up a strong following in Britain, where, as well as headlining small clubs, they supported Thunder the following year. The album was also released in America on Atco, including five new recorded tracks produced by Bob Rock, and five tracks from the domestic version. Their critically acclaimed debut album spawned the self-produced Billboard Top 20 single, “All Lips ’N’ Hips” that got them heavy rotation on MTV.

However, the follow-up album Groovus Maximus did not emerge until 1992. The Groovus Maximus album was recorded at the Abbey Road Studios in London. By the end of an American tour to promote it supporting Mr. Big, the band parted ways with members Santunione and Sigevall, and changed record deals, pursuing a heavier sound. Outgoing members were replaced by former Mogg drummer Thomas Broman and Martin Thomander (second guitar), and this line up released the band's third album, Freewheelin' on the Music For Nations label in Britain, also recorded at the Abbey Road Studios.The band opened up for Metallica in Sweden and performed several other shows before disbanding, In October 16th 1994 the band made their last concert and then split up. In 2005, founders Bloom and Christell both joined Hanoi Rocks.

The original lineup of the band (Bloom, Christell, Santunione, and Sigevall) reformed in 2009 and released And Them Boys Done Swang in 2011.

2014 saw the release of another album, Starflight United. The next album, called The Ghost Ward Diaries was released in November 2018 and featured drummer Jolle Atlagic as well as original drummer Niclas Sigevall.

They released the album Ups!de Down in 2021 on Mighty Music, featuring a returning Martin Thomander on guitar, again replacing Santunione. Sigevall who lives in Los Angeles didn't play on the album.

In September 2023 Electric Boys released "Grand Explosivos", their fifth album since the reunion in 2009.

== Members ==
- Conny Bloom - lead vocals, guitar, sitar (1988-1994, 2009–present)
- Andy Christell - bass guitar, backing vocals (1988-1994, 2009–present)
- Jolle Atlagic - drums (2015–present)
- Martin "Slim" Thomander - guitar, backing vocals (1993-1994, 2020-present)

=== Former ===
- Niklas Sigevall - drums (1988-1993, 2009–2023)
- Franco Santunione - guitar, backing vocals (1988-1993, 2009–2020)
- Thomas Broman - drums, backing vocals (1993-1994)

== Discography ==
=== Studio albums ===
- Funk-O-Metal Carpet Ride (1989)
- Funk-O-Metal Carpet Ride (1990) (US-Version)
- Groovus Maximus (1992)
- Freewheelin (1994)
- And Them Boys Done Swang (2011)
- Starflight United (2014)
- The Ghost Ward Diaries (2018)
- Ups!de Down (2021)
- Grand Explosivos (2023)

=== Singles ===
- 1987: "All Lips 'n Hips" (original version)
- 1990: "All Lips 'n Hips" (No. 76 US Hot 100, No. 16 US Mainstream Rock)
- 1990: "Electrified" (Phonogram Ltd. London. Catalog: UK - VERCD 50. Int - 878 455-2)
- 1990: "Excerpts From The Funk O' Metal Carpet Ride" (Vertigo EBCDJ 1)
- 1990: "Psychedelic Eyes"
- 1992: "Mary in the Mystery World" (No. 27 Sweden, No. 81 UK)
- 1992: "Groovus Maximus"
- 1992: "Dying to Be Loved"
- 1994: "Ready to Believe"
- 1994: "Groover" (Polar / Polygram Sweden. Catalog: Polar 855 405-2)
- 2011: "Father Popcorn's Magic Oysters"
- 2011: "Angel in an Armoured Suit"
- 2011: "Sometimes U Gotta Go Look for the Car (video)"
- 2011: "Ten Thousand Times Goodbye"
- 2013: "Dancing on My Own"
- 2014: "Spaced Out"
- 2014: "If Only She Was Lonely"
- 2017: "Dishes"
- 2018: "Suffer"
- 2018: "Hangover in Hannover"
- 2018: "You Spark My Heart"
- 2019: "Gone Gone Gone"
- 2020: "The Lions Roar"
- 2021: "Super God"
- 2021: "Tumblin' Dominoes"
- 2021: "It's Not the End"
- 2022: "Favorite Hello, Worst Goodbye"
- 2022: "Into the Midnight Sun"
- 2023: "I've Got A Feelin'"
- 2023: "Domestic Blitz"

=== Other recordings ===
- 1990: "För fet för ett Fuck" - Svullo with Electric Boys (No. 2 Sweden)
- 1992: "King Kong Song" - ABBA cover - for the Swedish ABBA tribute album ABBA: The Tribute, released on Polar Music.

== See also ==
- List of funk rock bands
- List of glam metal bands and artists
