= Oriental Beat =

Studio album by Hanoi Rocks
- Released: January 1982
- Recorded: November 1981
- Studio: Advision Studio, London, England
- Genre: Glam punk; hard rock
- Label: Johanna Kustannus
- Producer: Pete Wooliscroft

Hanoi Rocks chronology
Bangkok Shocks, Saigon Shakes, Hanoi Rocks (1981)	Oriental Beat (1982)	Self Destruction Blues (1982)

Oriental Beat is the second studio album by the Finnish glam punk band Hanoi Rocks, recorded in London and released in 1982. Oriental Beat also opened markets in the UK and Japan, where Hanoi eventually became very popular.

== Background ==
Recordings for Oriental Beat (then with the working-title, Second Attempt for Suicide) started in late 1981, at the Advision-studio in London. The album was produced, recorded and mixed by Peter Wooliscroft who had worked with Frank Zappa for example. This album also marked the first time McCoy was not the sole songwriter, with Monroe being the second songwriter on the songs "Motorvatin'" and "Teenangels Outsiders". Many of the lyrics deal with typical rock n' roll topics like breaking the law ("No Law or Order) and teenage rebellion ("Teenangels Outsiders"). The album features backing vocals by Katrina Leskanich, the lead singer of Katrina and the Waves. There's also a legend that originally Nasty Suicide sang the song "Devil Woman", but when asked about it Suicide replied: "you know too much".

The previous album, Bangkok Shocks, Saigon Shakes, Hanoi Rocks, was only released in Finland and Sweden, but this album opened the doors to an international career. British music magazine Kerrang! released their first article about Hanoi Rocks, when they reviewed Oriental Beat. Kerrang! since covered Hanoi Rocks career in the 80s extensively.

== Cover art ==
The artwork features the band covered in paint behind a glass panel with blue and red paint-pressed hand marks on it. The artwork was originally supposed to feature guitarist Andy McCoy's girlfriend's naked breasts painted blue and red with the legend "Hanoi Roxx" written across it. This was changed due to Castle Records' view that some record shops may refuse to stock the album due to the graphic nature of the cover. The record company was also worried that potential customers may get confused by the alternate spelling of the band's name. The original cover was used as the album's back cover.

== Re-mix ==
Over the years, Hanoi Rocks members have stated their dissatisfaction with the mixing of Oriental Beat. The original multitrack recordings of the album were found in 2020 after being lost for over 30 years and a newly mixed version, labeled Oriental Beat - 40th Anniversary Re(al)mix was released on March 17, 2023. The new version peaked at #2 on the Finnish Albums Chart and #1 on the Finnish Physical Albums Chart.

== Reception ==
Professional ratings
Review scores
Source	Rating
Allmusic	2.5/5 stars

Even though Oriental Beat is considered a Hanoi classic, many of the band members have called the album a failure. Michael Monroe has called the album great, but blamed the producer, Pete Wooliscroft, of ruining the album's sound with all-around bad producing and mixing, claiming that Wooliscroft had mixed the album while Hanoi Rocks was on tour, didn't know what Hanoi Rocks was about, and had mixed it without understanding the band's aesthetic. Sami Yaffa called the album "a piece of shit" in a 1985 interview. Even with these comments, the album was voted the 91st best rock album in the "100 Greatest Rock Albums" poll by the Finnish radio station Radio Rock. Oriental Beat beat out such albums as Kiss' Lick It Up and The Doors' Morrison Hotel. The song "Fallen Star" features in the episode titled "Monkey Dory" of the 2022 TV-series Peacemaker.

== Track listing ==
No.	Title	Writer(s)	Length
1.	"Motorvatin'"	Andy McCoy, Michael Monroe	3:15
2.	"Don't Follow Me"	Andy McCoy	3:19
3.	"Visitor"	Andy McCoy	3:14
4.	"Teenangels Outsiders"	Andy McCoy, Michael Monroe	3:24
5.	"Sweet Home Suburbia"	Andy McCoy	4:44
6.	"M.C. Baby"	Andy McCoy	3:01
7.	"No Law or Order"	Andy McCoy	3:41
8.	"Oriental Beat"	Andy McCoy	3:09
9.	"Devil Woman"	Andy McCoy	2:55
10.	"Lightning Bar Blues"	Hoyt Axton	2:39
11.	"Fallen Star"	Andy McCoy	2:34

2013 Japanese remastered edition
No.	Title	Writer(s)	Length
12.	"Devil Woman" (original version)	Andy McCoy	2:49
13.	"Do the Duck"	Andy McCoy	2:07
14.	"Hometown Breakdown" (demo)	Andy McCoy	2:07
15.	"Willing to Cross the Ocean" (demo)	Andy McCoy	2:07

== Personnel ==
Hanoi Rocks

- Michael Monroe – vocals, saxophone, harmonica
- Andy McCoy – guitar, backing vocals
- Nasty Suicide – guitars, backing vocals
- Sam Yaffa – bass
- Gyp Casino – drums

Additional personnel

- Katrina Leskanich – backing vocals on "Don't Follow Me"

== Production ==
- Producer: Pete Wooliscroft
- Mixing: Pete Wooliscroft
- Mastering: Pete Wooliscroft

== Charts ==
Chart (1981)	Peak position
Finnish Albums (The Official Finnish Charts)	3
Japanese Albums (Oricon)	90

Chart (2023)	Peak position
Finnish Albums (Suomen virallinen lista)	2
