= Andy McCoy =

Finnish guitarist (born 1962)

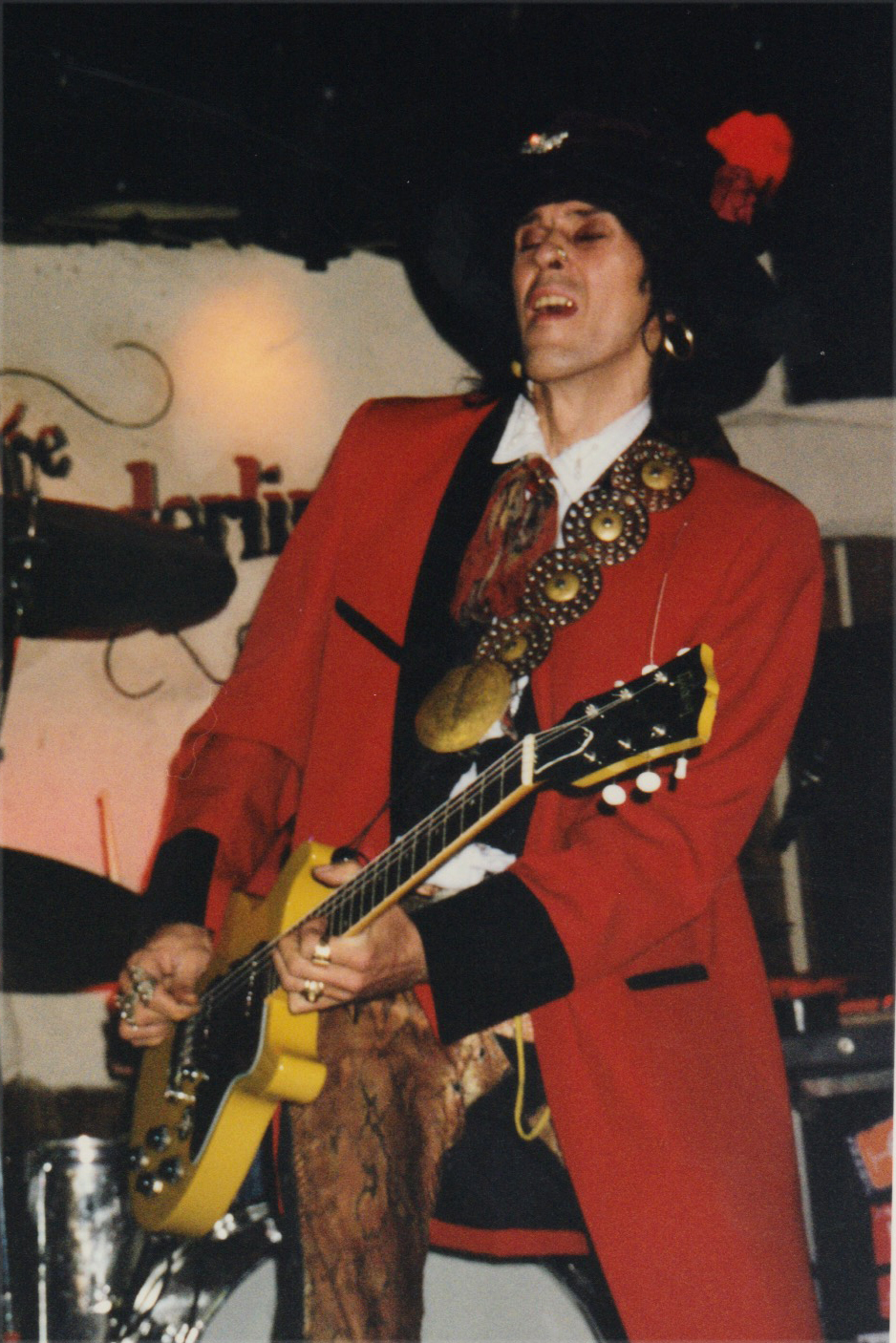
- McCoy performing at The Borderline in London, 2000

Background information
- Born: Antti Hulkko; 11 October 1962 (age 64); Pelkosenniemi, Finland
- Genres: Hard rock, glam punk, glam rock, rock 'n' roll, flamenco, punk rock, blues rock
- Occupations: Musician, songwriter
- Instruments: Guitar, piano, keyboards
- Years active: 1977–present
- Labels: Johanna, Amulet, Yahoo!, Essential, Mercury, Megamania
- Website: andymccoy.com

Antti Hulkko (born 11 October 1962), better known as Andy McCoy, is a Finnish musician. He is best known for his role as the lead guitarist and main songwriter of the rock band Hanoi Rocks, but has also played with Iggy Pop and a variety of other groups.

McCoy's works cover a range of music genres, including rock 'n' roll, punk rock, flamenco, glam punk, glam rock, blues rock and hard rock. He is also an avid painter.

== Biography ==
=== Hanoi Rocks (1979–1985, 2001–2009) ===
Before Hanoi Rocks, McCoy had become well known in his home country, Finland, due to his work in the punk rock band Pelle Miljoona Oy. During this time McCoy was talking with Matti Fagerholm (better known as Michael Monroe) to start a band of their own, but because McCoy was currently in Pelle Miljoona Oy, he told Monroe to start the band without him in 1979.

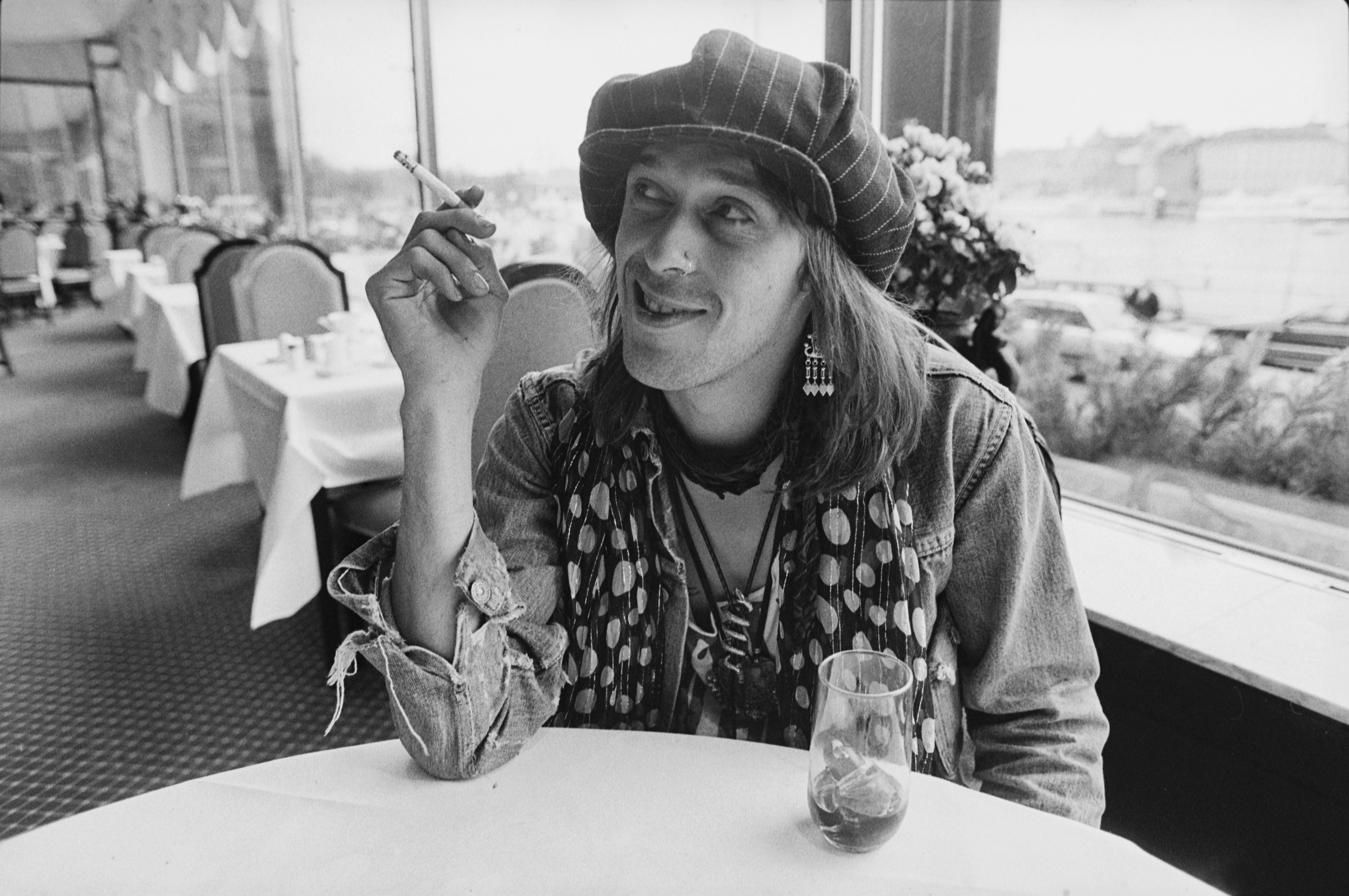
McCoy in Sweden, 1988

After McCoy left Pelle Miljoona Oy, he then joined Monroe in Hanoi Rocks, with another former-Pelle Miljoona Oy member, Sam Yaffa. At this point, the Hanoi Rocks line-up consisted of Michael Monroe (lead vocals), Andy McCoy (lead guitar), Nasty Suicide (rhythm guitar), Sam Yaffa (bass) and Swedish Gyp Casino (drums).

Hanoi Rocks released their first album in 1981 titled Bangkok Shocks, Saigon Shakes, Hanoi Rocks, with nine out of ten tracks written by McCoy. The album was produced by Andy McCoy and Michael Monroe who were known as "The Muddy Twins". In 1982 Hanoi Rocks recorded and released their second studio album Oriental Beat in London. The cover's back side was originally supposed to feature Andy McCoy's then girlfriend Anna's naked breasts painted blue and red with "Hanoi Roxx" written across it.

After the album's release, the band moved to London the same year, and subsequently fired drummer Gyp Casino before hiring Hanoi Rocks fan Nicholas Dingley, better known as Razzle, as drummer. The line-up with Razzle is considered the definitive version of Hanoi Rocks. Later that year the band released Self Destruction Blues, which had Razzle on the cover, but he didn't play on the album, because it was actually a compilation of old singles. The tour for the album took the band to Asia for the first time.

The next year 1983, the band released Back to Mystery City and after that, in 1984, the band worked with producer Bob Ezrin, and released Two Steps from the Move. Before this, McCoy had written most of the songs by himself, but for this album Bob Ezrin helped McCoy with the writing, along with Monroe. He also got some help with the lyrics from legendary Ian Hunter (of Mott The Hoople).

After Razzle's death, Sam Yaffa left the band due to personal differences with McCoy (amongst other reasons he was now engaged to Anna, McCoy's former girlfriend known from the Oriental Beat cover). The band tried out new members (amongst them The Clash ex-drummer Terry Chimes and bassist René Berg), but things didn't work out, so the band disbanded in 1985.

=== Cherry Bombz and Suicide Twins, first solo album (1985–1989) ===
After Hanoi Rocks' break-up in 1985, McCoy continued with his next project "The Cherry Bombz" which featured the last Hanoi line-up (except Michael Monroe), which consisted of Nasty Suicide, drummer Terry Chimes, bass player Timo Kaltio and vocalist Anita Chellemah of Toto Coelo fame (previously scoring a hit with "I Eat Cannibals"). The band was perceived as being the next stage of Hanoi Rocks. The music of The Cherry Bombz was actually very similar to that of Hanoi Rocks. The band played a handful of shows in Europe and in the United States in 1985 and 1986 and released two EPs and a live album and video, but never a full-length studio album. In 1986, Timo Kaltio was replaced by bassist Dave Tregunna (Sham 69, Lords of the New Church), but the group broke up the next year.

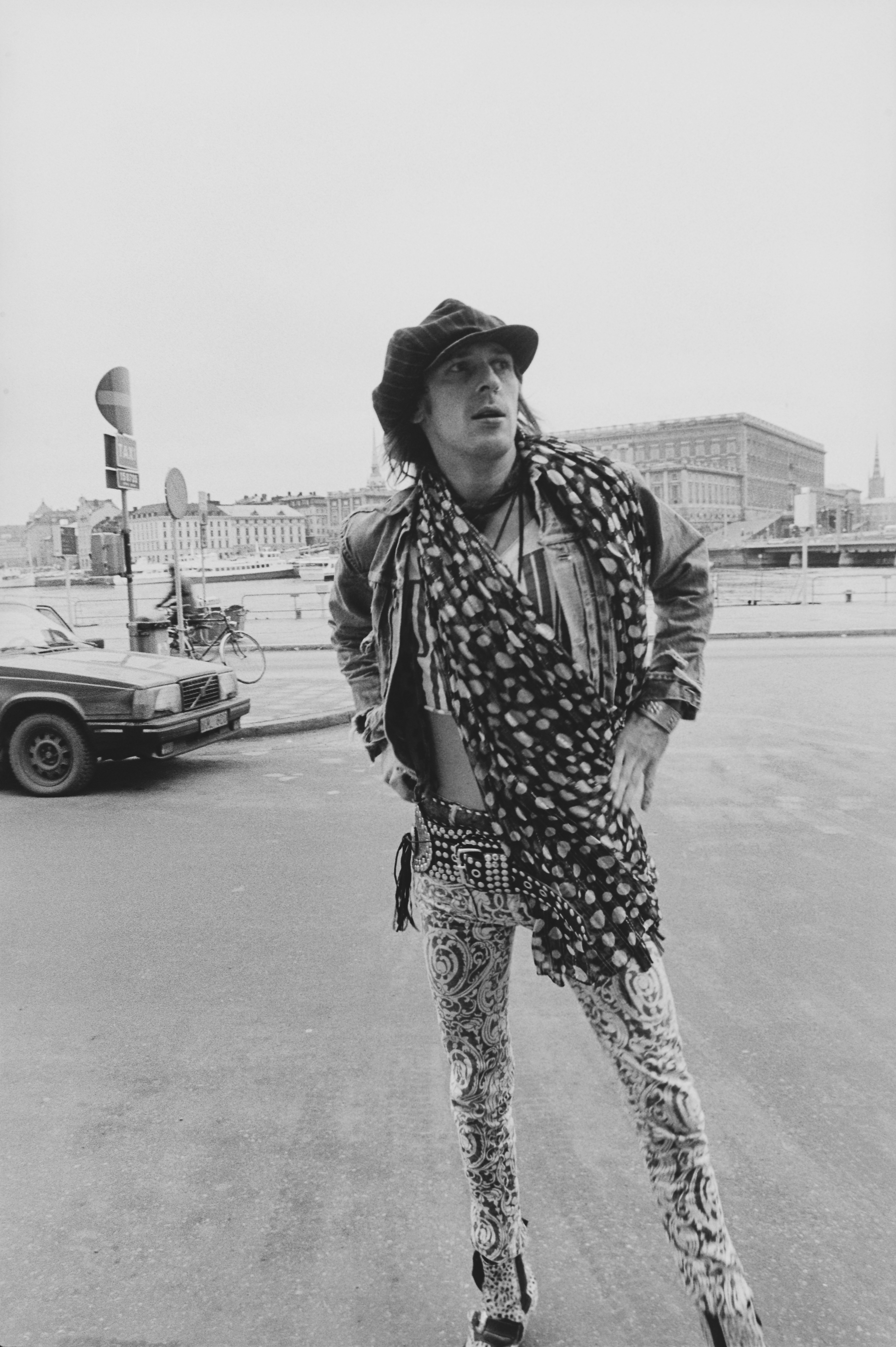
McCoy in 1988

McCoy also worked with Nasty Suicide under the moniker "The Suicide Twins" and released the album Silver Missiles And Nightingales (which was the original working tile for Two Steps from the Move) in 1986, which also featured a guest appearance by René Berg. "The Suicide Twins" project disbanded in 1987

McCoy spent the rest of 1987 not doing much, except releasing his memoir titled "Andy McCoy – Hanoista ikuisuuteen (From Hanoi to Eternity),"but nothing else. In 1988 McCoy released his first solo-album titled Too Much Ain't Enough. For the rest of 1988 McCoy did some acoustic gigs in Finland, moved to London and then to Los Angeles. Next McCoy struck a record deal with BMG. McCoy also became the first Finnish artist to have a gold record in the US, when Samantha Fox recorded a cover of The Suicide Twins' song "The Best Is Yet to Come"

The rest of 1988 and some of 1989 McCoy spent touring as the guitarist for Iggy Pop. In 1989 McCoy appeared on the U.K. Subs' album Killing Time.

=== Shooting Gallery and solo career (1990–2009) ===
In the beginning of the 1990s, McCoy lived in Los Angeles with his son and new girlfriend, Johnny Thunders' cousin Angela Nicoletti (former girlfriend of Izzy Stradlin). McCoy formed the band Shooting Gallery and married Angela in October 1991. Shooting Gallery toured as an opening act for Kiss during a U.S. tour and also released an album in 1992, before breaking-up that same year. Shooting Gallery shortly came back and toured in Finland with Gyp Casino on drums in 1994, but again disbanded that same year.

In 1995 McCoy's second solo-album Building on Tradition was released and, aside from Hanoi Rocks, it became McCoy's biggest success. The album's biggest hit "Strung Out" was originally meant for Shooting Gallery, but it was not recorded until the second solo-album. For the tour for Building on Tradition, McCoy assembled the band Live Ammo, which featured McCoy (guitar, vocals), Angela McCoy (vocals), Dan Lagerstedt (guitar, vocals), Andy Christell (bass), Gyp Casino (drums) and Christian André (keyboards). Christell had to soon leave the band for family reasons, so Lagerstedt started to play bass. André was also fired from the band, and they soon disbanded.

Also in 1995, McCoy appeared on The 69 Eyes' songs "Vietnamese Baby" and the song "Wild Talk" from the album Savage Garden. Next McCoy returned to his childhood passion: painting (which he still does).

In 1996, McCoy and Pete Malmi reformed their old band Briard after 20 years. The new Briard (which also included Angela McCoy) released a new album simply titled Briard. That same year filmmaker Pekka Lehto started the filming for the movie The Real McCoy, a half-real, half-fictional bio-pic on McCoy. The film was released in 1999. McCoy's autobiography Sheriff McCoy: Outlaw Legend of Hanoi Rocks was published in English translation on 17 September 2009 by Bazillion Points Books.

=== Hanoi Rocks reunion (2001–2009) ===
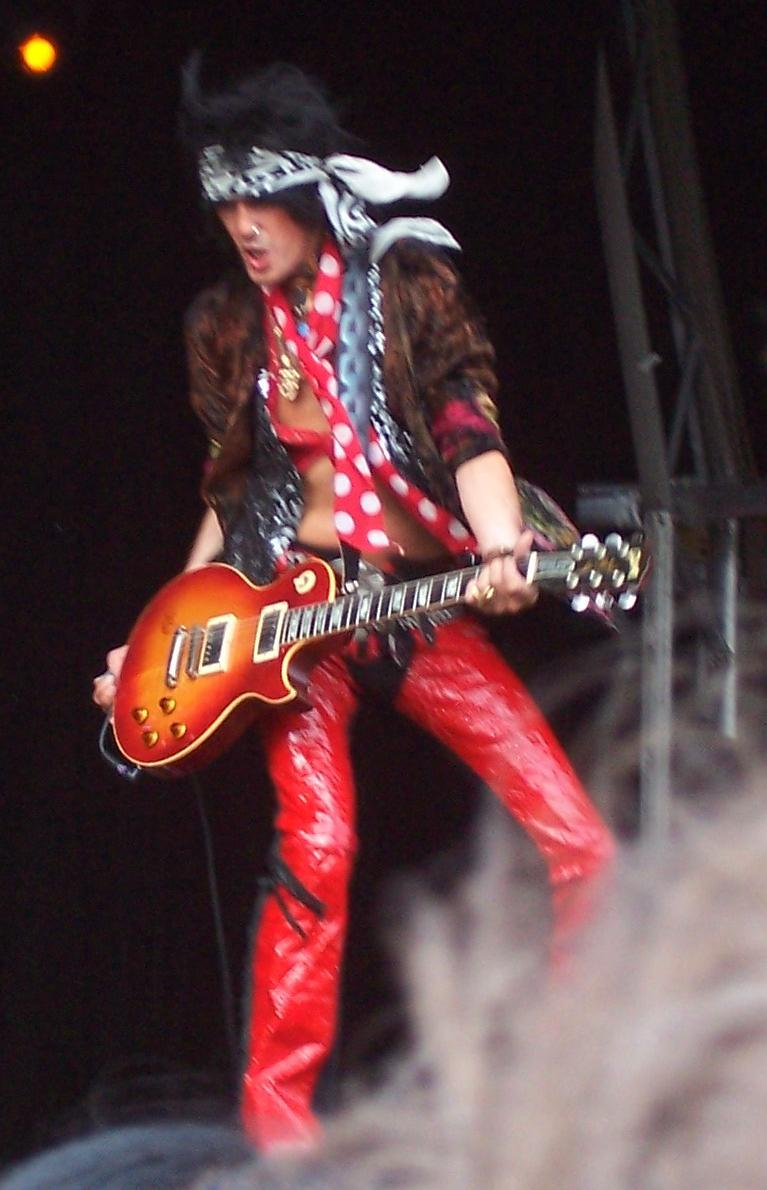
McCoy playing live in 2005

In 2001 McCoy and Michael Monroe started working together again and decided to reform Hanoi Rocks with two new members on guitar and bass, with Michael Monroe's solo career drummer, Lacu. They released Twelve Shots on the Rocks that same year. In 2005 they released Another Hostile Takeover with new members Andy Christell on bass and Conny Bloom on guitar (both formerly of the Electric Boys).

In 2007 the band released the album Street Poetry. In 2008 Andy McCoy and Michael Monroe stated that they had taken the band as far as they could and so they decided to end the band. Hanoi Rocks played 8 sold out farewell gigs in 6 days at Tavastia Club, Helsinki. The original guitarist Nasty Suicide appeared as a special guest on three of the last gigs.

After Hanoi officially ended in 2009, Andy McCoy formed a band called "The Real McCoy Band", but this band broke up after just three shows, when guitarist Chris Shiflett decided to leave the group and returned to the US.

=== Other projects ===
Besides music, Andy McCoy is an avid painter and he also makes a lot of his own and his wife's clothes, along with designing jewellery, scarfs and other accessories. McCoy held his first Art Exhibition McCoy Hits Canvas at The Cable Factory in Helsinki in 2010.

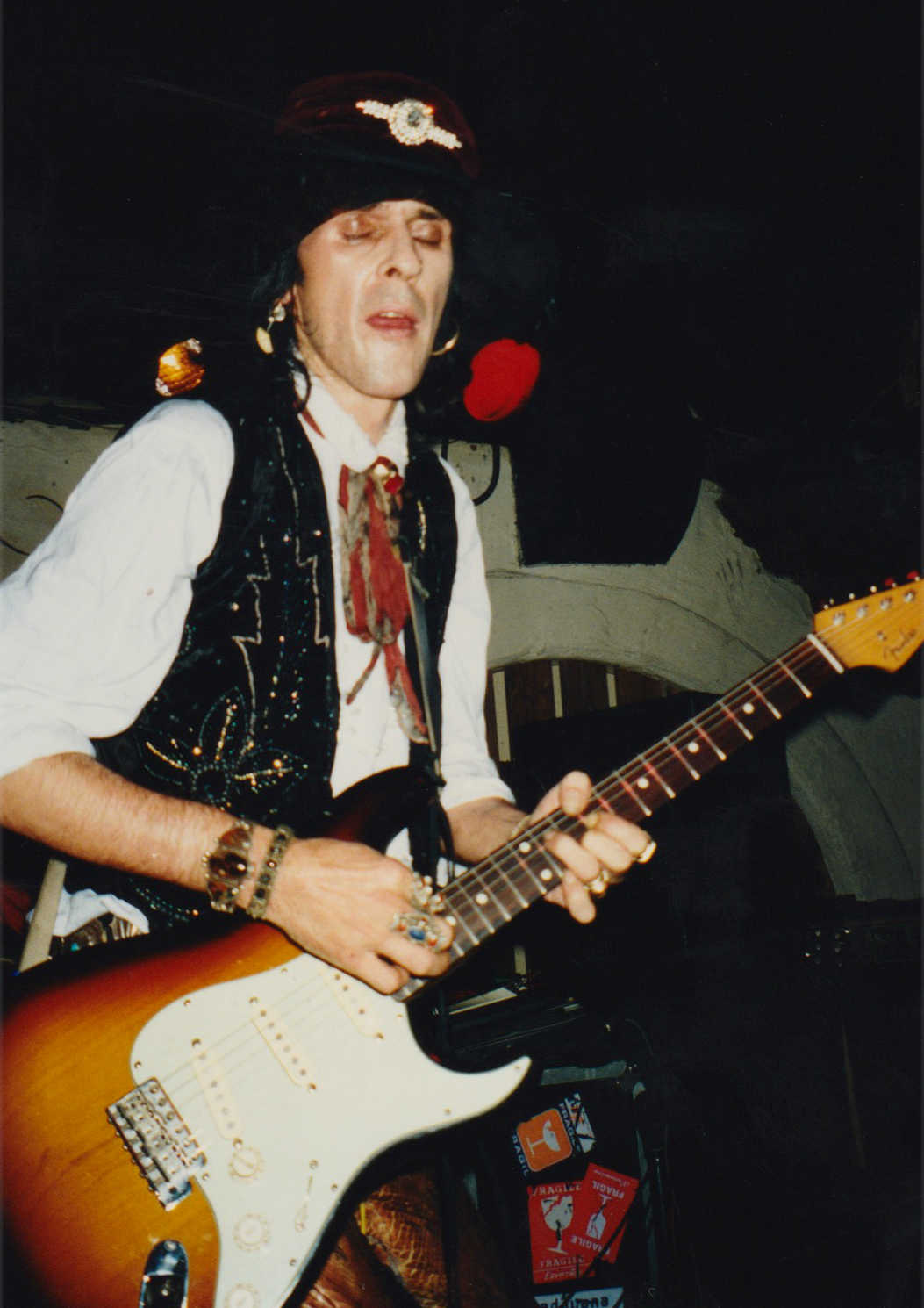
McCoy at the Borderline Club, London, 2000

After 2009, McCoy was recruited as lead guitarist for Grease Helmet, a new Helsinki-based band. The self titled first album of the band was released in September 2012. McCoy entered Finland's Celebrity Big Brother Tv show on 3 September 2013.

Besides working with Grease Helmet, McCoy has also performed with several other bands including the new band for a Finnish punk singer, Pelle Miljoona (which he had played before joining Hanoi Rocks) as well as Bam Margera's band in which he toured in Australia in 2015.

McCoy released an EP "Soul Satisfaction" in December 2018 and toured with Pelle Miljoona Oy from November 2018 to late August 2019. The band released a new EP called "Anna soihtusi palaa" (Let your torch burn) in October 2018 with McCoy on the guitar. McCoy released a new single "Seven Seas" on 15 August 2019, with the announcement of a tour starting in 2020 and a full album release on 27 September the same year. He also hosted an art exhibition with an acoustic gig at Hard Rock Cafe in Helsinki on the release day of the single Seven Seas.

In 2022, he put out Jukebox Junkie, a covers album featuring eclectic takes on songs by artists such as Toots & The Maytals, Squeeze, and Wanda Jackson.

== Personal life ==
McCoy was born in Pelkosenniemi, Finland, but grew up in Stockholm, Sweden. His mother was Finnish and Swedish, and McCoy has stated that his paternal grandfather was a Romani musician who taught him "gypsy and flamenco guitar" in his childhood, but in a 2012 interview his brother Ilkka Hulkko denied the Roma roots and described their "grandfather Eino" as "a good accordion player but not a Romani".

Throughout his career, McCoy has also struggled with long-standing issues related to drug and alcohol abuse.

McCoy was previously married to Anastasia Maisonneuve, the ex-girlfriend of his Hanoi Rocks bandmate Michael Monroe, and the former common-law wife of musician Stiv Bators. She and McCoy have a son together. McCoy was married to Angela Nicoletti, cousin of Johnny Thunders, between 1991 and 2021.

== Legacy ==
When Acey Slade was asked "Who is the best guitarist in rock right now?" He replied: "Andy McCoy. Period. When Dave Grohl met Andy McCoy, he said 'I have met my first rockstar.' That's a pretty good reason."

McCoy is a friend of Bam Margera (professional skater and Jackass star). McCoy made appearances in Viva la Bam and Bam Margera Presents: Where the#$&% Is Santa?, and appeared several times on radio Bam. Margera has a tattoo of McCoy on his right arm.

Foo Fighters guitarist Chris Shiflett wrote a song about Andy McCoy titled "Helsinki" Song is included on the Chris Shiflett album Chris Shiflett & the Dead Peasants

On 27 July 2009 a statue of McCoy (sculpted in wood by Matti Hulkko) was erected in the main square of Pelkosenniemi. All proceeds went to charity for newcomers in the music business.

== Discography ==
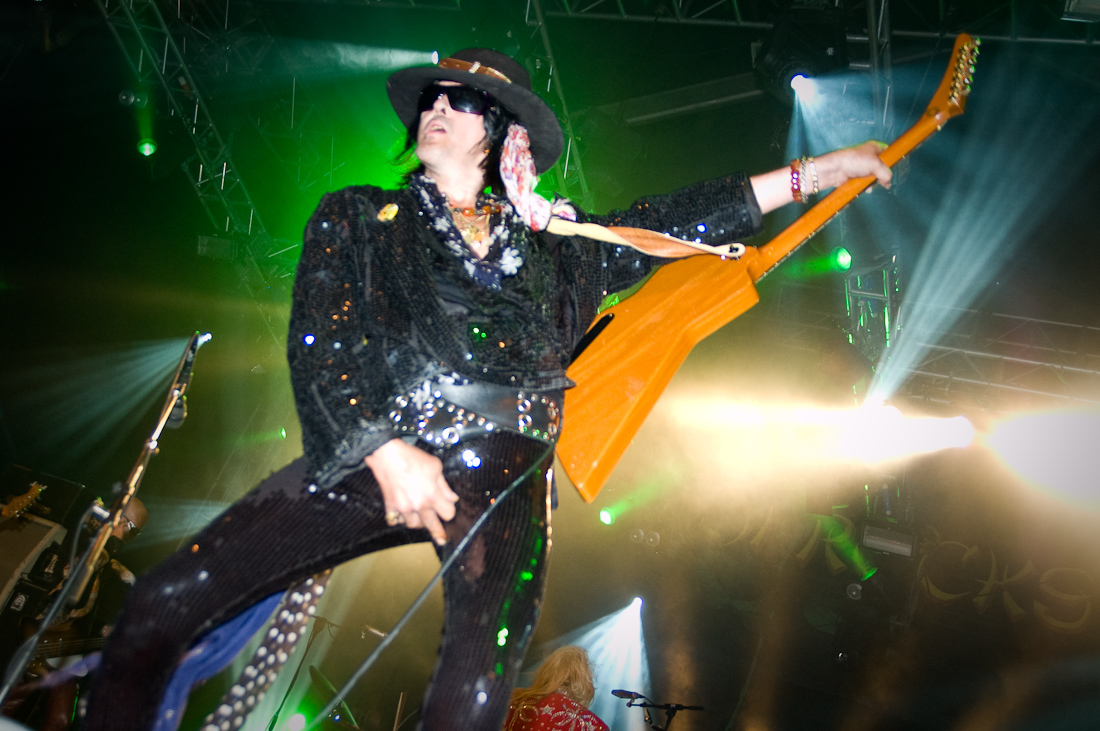
McCoy performing in 2008

=== Solo ===
- Too Much Ain't Enough (1988)
- Building on Tradition (1995)
- The Real McCoy – Original Motion Picture Soundtrack (1999)
- R'n'R Memorabilia – The Best Solo Tracks So Far! (2003)
- Soul Satisfaction (2018)
- 21st Century Rocks (2019)
- Jukebox Junkie (2022)

=== Briard ===
- I Really Hate Ya – 7" (1977)
- Fuck the Army – 7" (1978)
- Chirpy Chirpy Cheap Cheap – 7" (1979)
- Miss World – LP (1983)
- Briard (1996)
- Miss World – rerelease with 15 bonus songs (2005)

=== Pelle Miljoona Oy ===
- Moottoritie on kuuma (1980)
- Anna soihtusi palaa (2018)

=== Suicide Twins ===
- Silver Missiles and Nightingales (1986)

=== Cherry Bombz ===
- Cherry Bombz/Hot Girls in Love (mini-LP) (1985)
- House of Ecstasy (EP) (1986)
- "Coming Down Slow" (Live) (1987)

=== Shooting Gallery ===
- Shooting Gallery 1992 (Mercury records)

=== Grease Helmet ===
- Grease Helmet (2012)

=== Guest appearances ===
- Maukka Perusjätkä: Ennen kolmatta maailmansotaa (1980)
- Pete Malmi: Malmi Re-released 2005 (1981)
- Urban Dogs: Urban Dogs (McCoy on guitar on A Bridge Too Far and Human Beings) (1983)
- Fallen Angels: Fallen Angels (McCoy on additional guitar) (1983)
- Fallen Angels: In Loving Memory (McCoy on additional guitar) (1986)
- UK Subs: Killing Time (McCoy plays guitar on Drag Me Down) (1988)
- Snatches of Pink: Bent With Pray (McCoy plays guitar on Screams) (1992)
- The 69 Eyes: Savage Garden (Wild Talk with/by McCoy) (1995)
- The 69 Eyes: Velvet Touch (McCoy plays guitar on TV Eye) (1995)
- Juice Leskinen: Kiveä ja sämpylää (1996)
- XL5: Taas Mennään (Guitar by McCoy) (1996)
- 22 Pistepirkko: Downhill City (McCoy on the song Let The Romeo Weep) (1999)
- The 4 Faces: Best Of Both Worlds b/w Poison Heart (single) (2002)
- Hidria Spacefolk: Balansia (McCoy on slide guitar on "Pajas") (2004)
