= Hanoi Rocks =

Finnish rock band

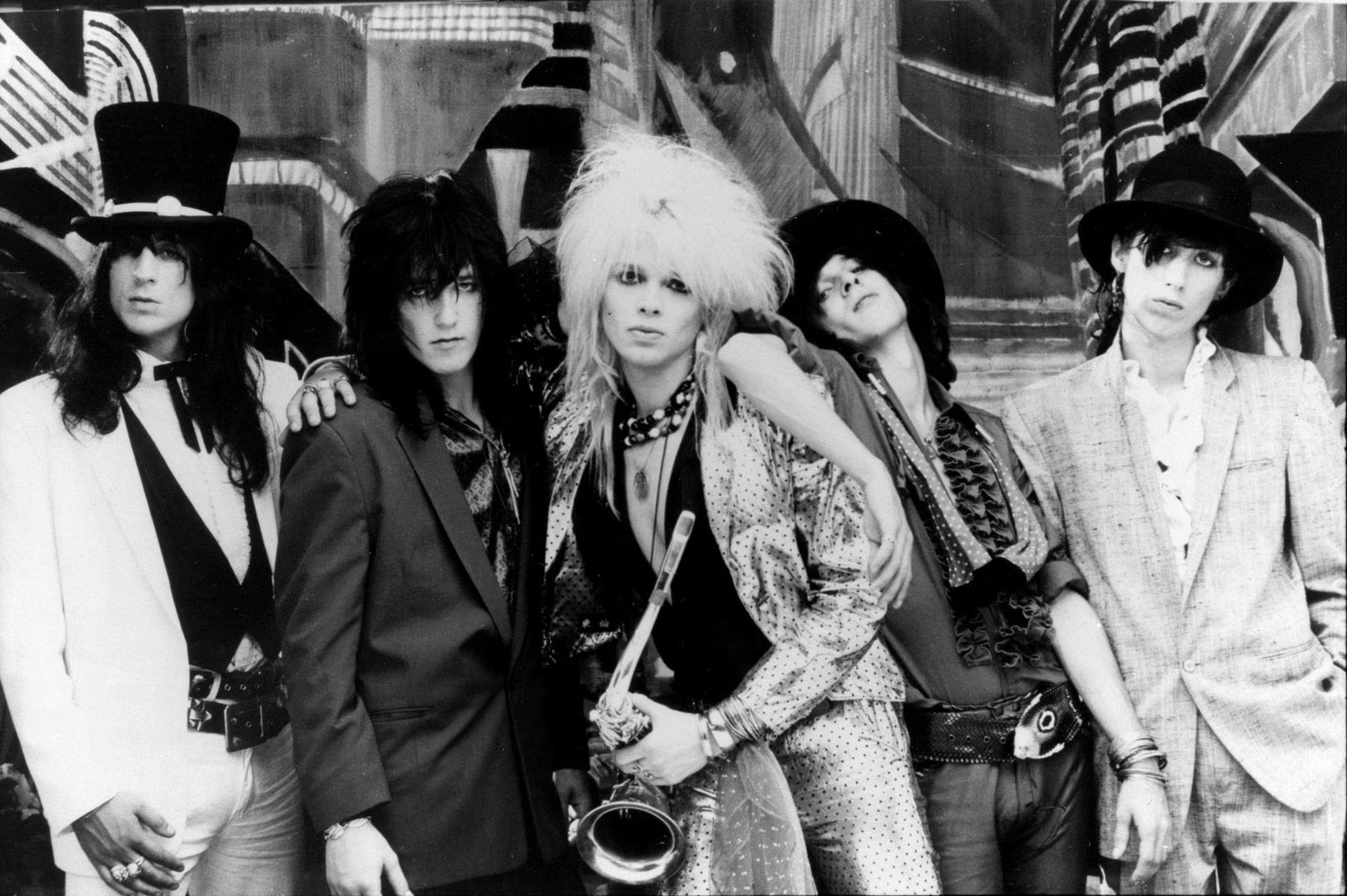
- Hanoi Rocks in 1984. Left to right: Razzle, Nasty Suicide, Michael Monroe, Andy McCoy and Sami Yaffa

Background information
- Origin: Helsinki, Finland
- Genres: Hard rock; glam rock; glam punk; glam metal
- Works: Discography
- Years active: 1979–1985; 2001–2009; 2022 (one-off reunion)
- Labels: Johanna Kustannus; Lick; Nippon Phonogram; Columbia/CBS; Major Leiden; Liquor and Poker Music; Backstage Alliance; Pronit
- Spinoffs: Demolition 23; Jerusalem Slim; Fallen Angels; The Suicide Twins; Cherry Bombz; Shooting Gallery; Michael Monroe Band
- Spinoff of: Pelle Miljoona Oy; Briard
- Past members: Michael Monroe; Andy McCoy; Nasty Suicide; Sami Yaffa; Gyp Casino; Razzle; Terry Chimes; René Berg; Tumppi Varonen; Peki Sirola; Nedo Soininen; Stefan Piesnack; Timo Kaltio; Lacu; Timpa Laine; Costello Hautamäki; Stevie Klasson; Conny Bloom; Andy "A.C." Christell; George Atlagic
- Website: hanoi-rocks.net

Hanoi Rocks were a Finnish rock band formed in Helsinki in 1979 by singer and multi-instrumentalist Michael Monroe (Matti Fagerholm). They were the first Finnish band to chart in the UK and were also popular in Japan. By 1984, the band was considered to be on the verge of an international breakthrough when they released their first major label album for CBS/Columbia and headed for their first US tour. The tour was cut short when their drummer Nicholas "Razzle" Dingley died in a drunk driving incident with Vince Neil behind the wheel in December 1984. The band never recovered from the loss and announced their split in June 1985.

After their initial break-up, lead singer Michael Monroe became the first Finnish artist to chart on the American Billboard 200 in 1989. Monroe and original lead guitarist Andy McCoy reunited in 2001 with a new lineup that lasted until 2009, releasing three studio albums during this period. Although musically closer to traditional rock and roll and punk rock, Hanoi Rocks has been cited as a major influence in the glam metal genre for bands such as Guns N' Roses, Skid Row and Poison.

According to Finnish radio and TV personality Jone Nikula, who was the band's tour manager in the 2000s, Hanoi Rocks's albums have sold between 780,000 and 1,000,000 copies around the world, mostly in Scandinavia and Japan.

The original line-up (Michael Monroe, Andy McCoy, Nasty Suicide, Sami Yaffa and Gyp Casino) reunited at Monroe's 60th birthday concert on 23 September 2022 at the Helsinki Ice Hall.

In 2020, Jeff Mezydlo of Yardbarker included them in his list of "the 20 greatest hair metal bands of all time". In 2023, the band released a 40th-anniversary re(al)mix edition of their 1982 album Oriental Beat, remixed by Petri Majuri. In late 2024, Monroe and Yaffa announced four European shows to celebrate the 40th anniversary of Two Steps from the Move (1984), performing the album in its entirety.

== History ==
=== Formation and early days (1979–1980) ===
Hanoi Rocks were formed in Helsinki in 1979 by Michael Monroe (Matti Fagerholm) and his friend, guitarist Andy McCoy (Antti Hulkko). McCoy did not join the band immediately, because he was the guitarist for the Finnish punk band Pelle Miljoona Oy. McCoy allowed Monroe to form the band with the agreement that McCoy would join the band later.

The original line-up of Hanoi Rocks was Monroe on vocals, former Pelle Miljoona Oy guitarist Stefan Piesnack, Monroe's guitarist Nasty Suicide, bassist Nedo Soininen, and Peki Sirola on drums.

The band toured Finnish clubs, playing McCoy and Monroe's own songs and covers like Cheap Trick's "He's a Whore", The Police's "Born in the 50s" and MC5's "Looking at You". At one of the band's first shows was Seppo Vesterinen, who had brought big-name artists like Iggy Pop and Frank Zappa to Finland. Vesterinen soon became the band's manager after speaking with McCoy and Monroe. In late 1980 Andy McCoy left Pelle Miljoona Oy to join Hanoi Rocks, and was later joined by another former Pelle Miljoona Oy member, bassist Sami Yaffa. McCoy replaced Stefan Piesnack, who had been arrested for drug possession, and Yaffa replaced Nedo. By then Peki had left the band, and when they relocated to Stockholm, they hired an old friend of Monroe and McCoy's, drummer Gyp Casino formerly of Warheads.

=== Stockholm, early recordings and London (1980–1981) ===
When they moved to Stockholm, the bandmembers lived mostly on the street, begging for money, except Andy McCoy, who lived with his wealthy girlfriend. In November 1980, the band struck a deal with Johanna Kustannus and released its debut single, "I Want You / Kill City Kills". "I Want You" was a new version of the Swedish song "Vill ha dej" by Heartbreak. McCoy had translated the song, whose title means "I Want You" in Swedish, into English and claimed it as his own. "Kill City Kills" was one of McCoy's oldest songs, which he had written when he was hanging around at a Finnish apartment block called Kill City. Gyp Casino was the band's drummer but did not play on the single as he was recording with another band in Stockholm.

The band launched a 102-day tour in January 1981, which is believed to be the longest rock tour in Finnish history. The tour developed the band's energetic and wild playing style, which audiences were slow to find pleasing but later praised the band for.

The second single "Tragedy / Café Avenue", written by McCoy when he was fifteen or sixteen years old, was released in February 1981. That same month, the band released its debut album, Bangkok Shocks, Saigon Shakes, Hanoi Rocks, produced by Michael Monroe and Andy McCoy, calling themselves "The Muddy Twins". The album was well-received, reaching number five on the Finnish album charts.

In September 1981, after extensive tours in Sweden and Finland, the band moved to London, where they recorded their second album. On 19 September 1981, the band made their debut at the Marquee Club in London. In late November they returned to Finland and released the single "Desperados / Devil Woman". Another single, "Dead by X-Mas / Nothing New", was released in December.

=== Oriental Beat and Razzle joins (1982) ===
In January 1982, Hanoi Rocks recorded their first music videos at the Lepakko, a concert venue and centre of independent youth culture, for the songs "Tragedy", "Oriental Beat", and "Motorvatin'". That same month, the band released their second album Oriental Beat. The album was mostly well received by critics and magazines, including Sounds and Kerrang!, whose Dave Dickson continued to extensively cover Hanoi Rocks's career in the 1980s. The band spent the spring of 1982 touring in Sweden, and had their first Japanese breakthrough with "Tragedy". In May, the single "Love's an Injection / Taxi Driver" was released.

By June 1982, the band had permanently moved to London. Monroe met a Hanoi Rocks fan called Razzle at a Johnny Thunders show. When Razzle, who was the drummer for London punk band The Dark, found out that Monroe was the singer for Hanoi Rocks, he attended some shows, showed up backstage, and asked to be the band's drummer. McCoy and Monroe fired Gyp Casino for his drug use, depression, and suicidal thoughts, and Razzle was hired as the new drummer.

In August 1982, Hanoi Rocks released their third studio album, Self Destruction Blues. The album featured old singles like "Love's an Injection". Razzle had yet to join the band when the songs were recorded, but he is credited on the album. The album was released in October in Finland, with "Love's an Injection" spending a week at number one on the Finnish singles charts. The band also signed a contract with the Japanese record company Nippon Phonogram.

=== Tour in Asia, Back to Mystery City and a deal with CBS (1983) ===
By January 1983, the band was touring outside of the UK, Finland, and Sweden. The Asian tour was largely covered by British magazines, and the band was featured on the cover of Sounds. The tour started in Bombay, continuing in Hong Kong and Japan. In Japan the band was very popular, with fans breaking into hotels to see the musicians. The ticket prices for the show were as high as for stadium-fillers, and some phone booths in Tokyo played Hanoi Rocks songs. The tour continued from Tokyo to Vietnam.

In April, the band returned to London for the recording of their fourth album, and then went to Israel, where they were not well received. Monroe could not leave the band's hotel room because of his somewhat unconventional appearance: local people thought he was an improperly-dressed woman and would gather around and spit on him. Also, Nasty Suicide broke his ankle; and people did not like the band's loud playing style. In late spring, Hanoi Rocks toured London and Norway, and released a single before the new album, "Malibu Beach / Rebel On The Run".

The band's fourth album, Back to Mystery City, was released shortly afterward. It reached number 87 on the UK Albums Chart. Hanoi Rocks toured the UK and in Finland until June 1983, when the band made a deal with CBS worth £150,000.

=== Bob Ezrin and All Those Wasted Years (1983–1984) ===
In August 1983, Hanoi Rocks released the 7" single "Until I Get You / Tragedy", and the 12" maxi-single "Until I Get You / Tragedy / Oriental Beat". On 13 August, Lick Records released Hanoi Rocks's first three albums in Britain for the first time. The next day, the band played a show at the Ruisrock festival in Turku, Finland. Before the show, Michael Monroe stated in an interview with the Finnish television station YLE that McCoy and Suicide's alcohol use had gotten out of hand, and that he did not drink or use drugs. In October 1983, producer Bob Ezrin flew from the US to see Hanoi Rocks live in London, and in December he was confirmed as the producer for the next album.

Their December shows at Marquee were recorded and released as a live album and an accompanying live video, both titled All Those Wasted Years.

=== Two Steps from the Move (1984) ===
In early 1984, Hanoi Rocks and Bob Ezrin recorded Two Steps from the Move, in New York and Toronto. Ezrin had invited Ian Hunter of Mott the Hoople to help with the songwriting, and Hunter brought Jack Bruce (formerly of Cream), who in turn brought Pete Brown, to the recording sessions. Brown wrote a lot of lyrics, but the only one the band used was "Smoked a lot of sky, drank a lot of rain", in "Million Miles Away".

By the end of April the new album was almost ready for release, but Ezrin and the label thought that the album was missing a hit, so they recorded Creedence Clearwater Revival's "Up Around the Bend", which was already a favorite of Michael Monroe and Nasty Suicide.

In May 1984, Hanoi Rocks went on tour in Bombay and Japan. In Japan, excitement over the band led to sold-out concert halls and fans following the band everywhere. Even in Finland people were baffled by the extent of the band's popularity in Japan.

The Japanese tour was followed by a tour across England and Scotland. British magazines raved about the band, and were certain that the next record would be their breakthrough. In June, the single "Up Around The Bend / Until I Get You" was released, but it also appeared as a double single and as an EP. A music video for "Up Around the Bend" was also produced. At the time it was the most expensive music video for any Finnish band. The song climbed to number 61 on the UK singles chart, and got radio airplay in America.

After a July tour in England, Two Steps from the Move, whose title was changed from Silver Missiles and Nightingales at the last minute, was released. It was their most successful album in the UK Albums Chart, where it peaked at number 28. "Underwater World / Shakes" and "Two Steps From the Move" were released as singles in the UK, and right away the band went on tour with Johnny Thunders.

In November the single "Don't You Ever Leave Me / Oil And Gasoline" was released, by which time the new album had sold 200,000 copies—most of them in the U.S. (60,000), Britain (50,000), and Finland (20,000). In the US the album sold 44,000 copies in its first two weeks.

After a Swedish tour, the band toured America until Michael Monroe fractured his ankle onstage at USA Sam's in Syracuse, New York, on 29 November, resulting in some of the dates being canceled. Los Angeles shows were all sold out in less than half an hour.

=== Razzle's death, Rock & Roll Divorce, and break-up (1984–1985) ===
On 8 December, Hanoi Rocks band members (except for Michael Monroe, who was recuperating from his fractured ankle) were partying with their friends Mötley Crüe, at lead singer Vince Neil's house. The party stopped when everybody noticed they were out of beer. Neil and Razzle, both drunk, went to a nearby liquor store in Neil's Pantera, with Neil driving. On the way back, they crashed into another car. Razzle was rushed to the hospital and pronounced dead at 7:12 p.m.; he had died instantly in the collision.

Both occupants of the other car were seriously injured, sustaining brain damage as a result of the crash. Andy McCoy and Mötley Crüe drummer Tommy Lee went looking for Neil and Razzle. They drove by the crash site and saw Neil handcuffed and put into a police car. They were informed that Razzle had been taken to a hospital where he was pronounced dead. McCoy informed the band's manager Seppo Vesterinen, who then told the rest of the band. The band returned to London. The only tour dates not canceled were two shows at Helsinki Kulttuuritalo on 3 and 4 January 1985, which were broadcast live under the title of "Europe A Go-Go" to a worldwide audience of 200 million viewers. Both shows became memorials to Razzle, with "Million Miles Away" dedicated to him. Former Clash drummer Terry Chimes played the drums.

In 1985, after the shows, Sami Yaffa left the group due to personal differences with Andy McCoy. The band returned to London to take a short break. Yaffa was replaced by bassist René Berg. Terry Chimes remained as the new drummer. Monroe planned to quit, but the record label convinced him to do a short tour in Poland, where "Don't You Ever Leave Me" was rising on the charts. Monroe agreed on the condition that no live record would be released, but a semi-official live album was released. Entitled Rock & Roll Divorce, the album was panned by the managers, band members and critics. René Berg often stated that Hanoi Rocks was "his band", which led to his replacement by bassist Timo Kaltio. This line-up never performed live, and on 17 June 1985, Monroe officially left Hanoi Rocks, ending the band. At the same time, "Don't You Ever Leave Me" rose to number 6 on the Polish singles chart and Hanoi Rocks's popularity continued into the 1990s.

=== Rebirth and new success (2001–2007) ===
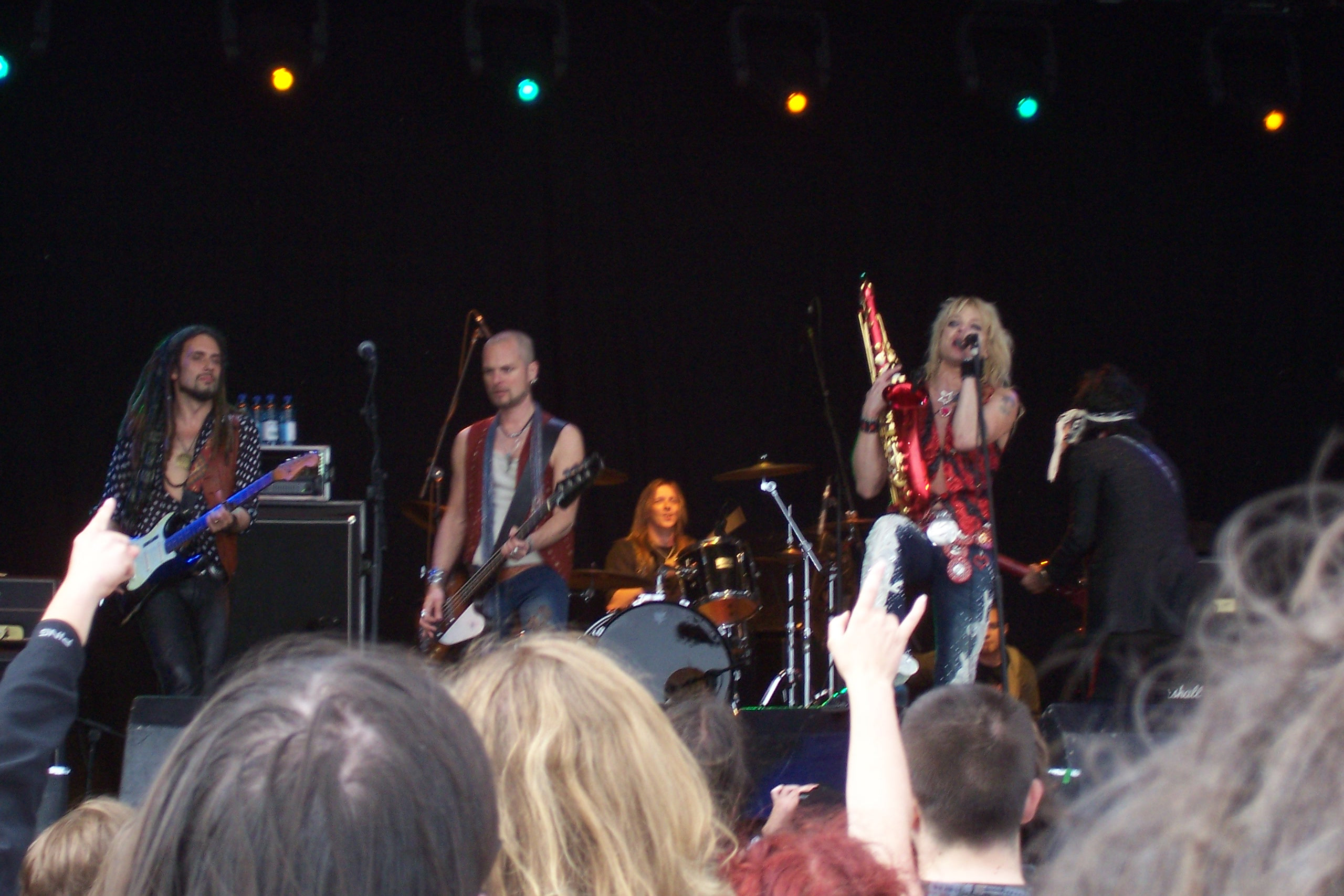
Hanoi Rocks in 2005

In February 2001, Monroe and McCoy performed together for the first time since 1985 in Turku, Finland. They toured again in the summer of 2001, under the moniker "Hanoi Revisited".

After the short tour, Monroe and McCoy agreed to reform the band. This would be (as the two put it), a "rebirth", not a reformation of Hanoi Rocks, mainly because none of the other members were able to join: Razzle was dead; Nasty Suicide had become a pharmacist; Sami Yaffa was a member of a New York-based group called Mad Juana and the bassist for the New York Dolls; and Gyp Casino was no longer active in music. "The Muddy Twins" chose Kari "Lacu" Lahtinen from Monroe's solo band to play the drums, Timpa Laine (also from Monroe's solo band) to play the bass, and Costello Hautamäki from the Finnish rock band Popeda to play guitar.

The new Hanoi Rocks toured. McCoy and Monroe made a deal that they would be equal writers on songs, and not just McCoy. By 2002, the two had written enough songs for an album, and Twelve Shots on the Rocks was released. Although the album was a hit in Finland and Japan, Monroe and McCoy were not present when the album was mixed, and when they heard the finished product they were not happy. The album was remixed in 2003, featuring two new songs, "Moonlite Dance" and "Bad News".

Most of 2003 and 2004 consisted of touring, but Costello departed to continue his work with Popeda. Costello was replaced by guitarist Stevie Klasson, whose only recording with Hanoi Rocks was the "Keep Our Fire Burning" single. Klasson was fired from Hanoi Rocks in the fall of 2004 for not getting along with other members. Bassist Timpa left because of family issues.

In 2004 the band (now consisting of Monroe, McCoy and Lacu) headed to the studio to record the album Another Hostile Takeover. With no bassist and no guitarist, Monroe had to play some of the bass and guitar parts, but in early 2005 the band was able to find a new guitarist, Conny Bloom. Bloom had played with Gyp Casino and the Electric Boys and fit well with Hanoi Rocks. He suggested that bassist Andy "A.C." Christell, who had also played with the Electric Boys, should join the band.

The reaction to Another Hostile Takeover was mixed. Critics liked the album's diversity and braveness to try new things, but some of the old fans and hard rock fans thought that the album was weird and that Hanoi Rocks had changed too much since the 1980s.

In 2005 and 2006, the band toured in Europe and Asia.

On 18 August 2007 the band perform their new single 'Fashion' on Swedish Saturday live TV show Sommarkrysset (TV4). For 2007's Street Poetry the band worked on some of the unfinished songs from the 1980s, such as "Teenage Revolution", which was first thought of during the Two Steps from the Move sessions in 1984. This album also marked the first time that other band members besides Monroe and McCoy were permitted to write songs. Street Poetry was released on 5 September 2007, and a music video was shot for the first single, "Fashion".

=== The final break-up (2008–2009) ===
On 25 January 2008 Lacu suddenly announced that he was going to leave Hanoi Rocks to join Popeda. On 20 March, the band started their first acoustic tour, titled “Hanoi Rocks Steppin’ Out Acoustically”, during which the band's drum technician played drums. On 25 May, it was announced that the band's new drummer would be Swedish drummer George Atlagic. By this time Monroe and McCoy had come to the decision that Hanoi Rocks's time had come to an end, as they no longer had collaborated since 2007 and things were getting stale. Eventually Monroe and McCoy released a statement that they had taken the band as far as they could and that the band would break up.

In late 2008 an autobiography titled All Those Wasted Years was released. It mainly covered Hanoi Rocks's career in the 1980s and included rare photos of the band and its members and new interviews with Monroe, McCoy, Nasty Suicide, Gyp Casino, Seppo Vesterinen, Richard Bishop and countless others.

Hanoi Rocks did a farewell tour in Japan in spring of 2009 where they played six shows. Tokyo's Studio Coast on 8.3.2009, Fukuoka's Drum Logos on 10.3.2009, Osaka's Namba Hatch on 11.3.2009, Nagoya's Diamond Hall on 12.3.2009, Kawasaki's Club Citta on 13.3.2009 and finally Sendai's Zepp Sendai on 15.3.2009. A rare farewell tour of Japan 2009 book was released of the Japan tour which included many old band photos and history information about the band and the albums they recorded.

Hanoi Rocks announced that they would play eight farewell shows over six days at the Tavastia Club in Helsinki. All the shows were sold out, and the band's original guitarist Nasty Suicide appeared as a special guest in three of the last gigs, and Lacu also appeared at the final show.

The last show was released as a DVD in late 2009, titled Buried Alive.

=== Second reunion (2022) ===
On 23 September 2022, an early line-up of Michael Monroe, Andy McCoy, Nasty Suicide, Sami Yaffa and Gyp Casino reunited in celebration of Monroe's 60th birthday, at the Helsinki Ice Hall.

== Legacy ==
Although Hanoi Rocks never achieved huge commercial success, they have a very big cult following and they have received critical acclaim for their musical style and energetic live performances. On 5 January 1985, Hanoi Rocks was featured in almost every category in a poll cast by Sounds, including Best Album (5th), Best Band (2nd) and Best Live Act (3rd).

Hanoi Rocks's influence can be seen in various bands, including Guns N' Roses, and their glam look has been used by many bands, including Poison, L.A. Guns and Ratt. Other bands like Manic Street Preachers, Murderdolls, Skid Row and the Foo Fighters have acknowledged being Hanoi Rocks fans. Alice in Chains also often played Hanoi Rocks's "Taxi Driver" live in their early days. Other Finnish rock groups that were influenced by Hanoi Rocks include The 69 Eyes (with whom McCoy has also worked) and Negative. In Finland, Hanoi Rocks is known as the Finnish rock band who, at their time, had come closest to real international fame, only much later giving way to such groups as HIM, Nightwish, Sonata Arctica, Stratovarius, Children of Bodom and Turisas.

Hanoi Rocks also brought the glam rock look of the 1970s back into style. In 2003, when Nasty Suicide was asked about the band's look, he said that he and Michael Monroe decided to keep the punk leather jackets but bring a kind of "transvestite vibe to it".

Even though Hanoi Rocks influenced many 1980s glam bands, some feel that these bands ripped off Hanoi Rocks. In 2008 Joe Elliott, frontman of English hard rock band Def Leppard, described his dislike of 1980s glam metal bands like Mötley Crüe and Poison, and said this about Hanoi Rocks:

The only band — and I'm not saying it because we're here (Sweden Rock Festival) — the only band that did pull it off was Hanoi Rocks. I thought Hanoi Rocks were a good band, and they looked ... Michael Monroe (Hanoi frontman) was one of the best ... I would have shagged him. [Laughs] I like Michael, I think he's sexy, and I'm not gay. And I think Andy McCoy (Hanoi guitarist) does the best kind of Keith Richards ... so much better than Mötley Crüe or Poison or any of those bands. They (Hanoi Rocks) were real — the rest of the guys, it was all a bit fake for me.

Michael Monroe and Hanoi Rocks have influenced many rock'n'roll artists and bands: Slash and Duff McKagan had bought tickets to the sold-out gigs in Los Angeles, which were canceled because of the death of Razzle. In the Hanoi Rocks autobiography All Those Wasted Years Foo Fighters guitarist Chris Shiflett says "The Hollywood scene changed in just one night after people saw the pictures of Hanoi Rocks. After that everyone was wearing the same kind of hair, clothes and make up as Monroe". Michael Monroe and Hanoi Rocks have often been mentioned as the starters of the Hollywood's glam-rock scene, which was then adopted and developed by many 1980s glam, punk, and hard rock bands like Mötley Crüe, Jetboy, LA Guns and Poison.

Hanoi Rocks is cited as one of the most influential glam metal bands of all time in the Metal: A Headbanger's Journey documentary movie.

American TV Channel VH1 named the top "hair bands" of all time, and Hanoi Rocks was at number 40. When Sami Yaffa was asked about it, he replied: "We were a hat band, not a hair band!".

In 2013, American newspaper LA Weekly listed Hanoi Rocks at number 1 on their list of the "15 Best Hair Metal Bands of All Time".

Andy McCoy has said that the Guns N' Roses song "Paradise City" is a compilation of a few riffs of Hanoi Rocks. He said the chorus is the same as the riff in "Lost in the City", just slowed down. Nasty Suicide can also be seen in the music video for "Paradise City".

The Guns N' Roses song "Right Next Door to Hell" was co-written by former Hanoi Rocks bassist Timo Kaltio.

Hanoi Rocks is mentioned in the Bret Michaels song "Human Zoo" on his 1998 soundtrack album, A Letter from Death Row.

Hanoi Rocks is mentioned in the NOFX song "We Got Two Jealous Agains" on their 2003 album The War on Errorism.

Hanoi Rocks is mentioned in the Red House Painters song "Cruiser" on their 2001 album Old Ramon.

The fictional character Peacemaker mentions Hanoi Rocks as "only the greatest band of all time" in the eponymous 2022 TV series. The same episode also features Hanoi Rocks songs "11th Street Kids" and "Fallen Star". The characters go on to refer to themselves as "the 11th Street Kids" in subsequent episodes.

== Band members ==
Final known performing lineup

- Michael Monroe – lead vocals, saxophone, harmonica; occasional drums, keyboards, guitar (1979–1985, 2002–2009, 2022)
- Nasty Suicide – rhythm and lead guitar; backing and occasional lead vocals (1979–1985, guest appearances in the 2000s, 2022)
- Andy McCoy – lead and rhythm guitar, backing vocals; occasional keyboards, piano (1980–1985, 2002–2009, 2022)
- Sami Yaffa – bass, backing vocals (1980–1985, 2022)
- Gyp Casino – drums (1980–1982, 2022)

Former

- Peki Sirola – drums (1979–1980)
- Nedo Soininen – bass (1979–1980)
- Stefan Piesnack – lead and rhythm guitar (1979–1980)
- Tumppi Varonen – drums (1980)
- Razzle – drums, backing and occasional lead vocals (1982–1984; his death)
- Terry Chimes – drums (1985)
- René Berg – bass (1985; died 2003)
- Timo Kaltio – bass (1985; died 2021)
- Lacu – drums (2002–2008)
- Timppa Laine – bass (2002–2004)
- Costello Hautamäki – rhythm and lead guitar, backing vocals (2002–2004)
- Stevie Klasson – rhythm and lead guitar, backing vocals (2004)
- Conny Bloom – rhythm and lead guitar, backing vocals (2004–2009)
- Andy "A.C." Christell – bass, backing vocals (2005–2009)
- George Atlagic – drums (2008–2009)

Timeline

== Discography ==
- Bangkok Shocks, Saigon Shakes, Hanoi Rocks (1981)
- Oriental Beat (1982)
- Self Destruction Blues (1982)
- Back to Mystery City (1983)
- Two Steps from the Move (1984)
- Twelve Shots on the Rocks (2002)
- Another Hostile Takeover (2005)
- Street Poetry (2007)

== Videography ==
- All Those Wasted Years – The Marquee Club
- The Nottingham Tapes – Rock City (in Nottingham)
- Buried Alive – Last show at the Tavastia Club
