= Costello Hautamäki =

Finnish musician and composer (born 1963)

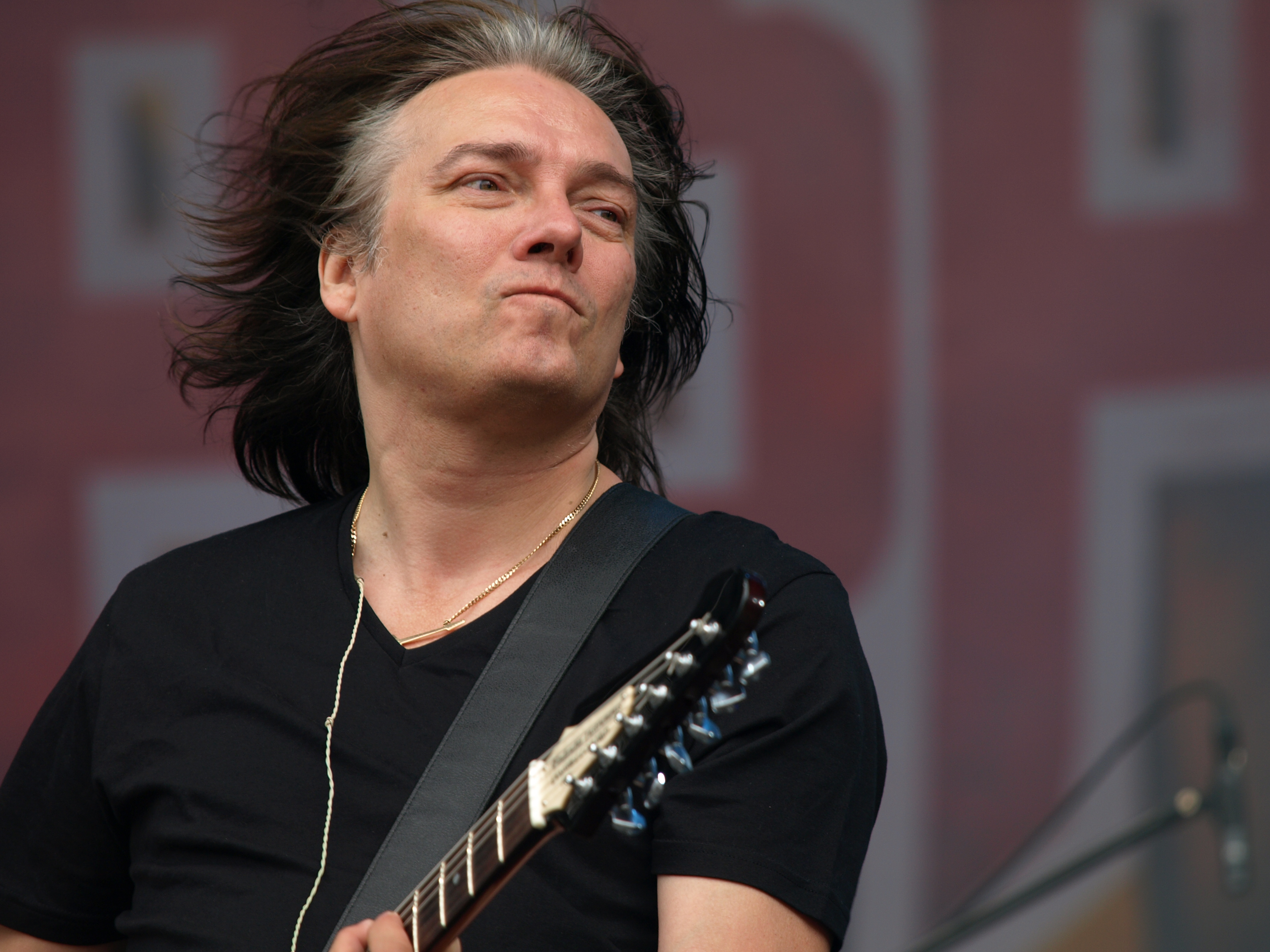
- Costello Hautamäki performing with Popeda at Provinssirock festival in 2013.

Background information
- Also known as: Costello
- Born: 11 September 1963 (age 62); Tampere, Finland
- Genres: Rock music
- Occupation: Musician
- Instrument: guitar
- Years active: 1978–present
- Labels: Poko Rekords; HighLight Music

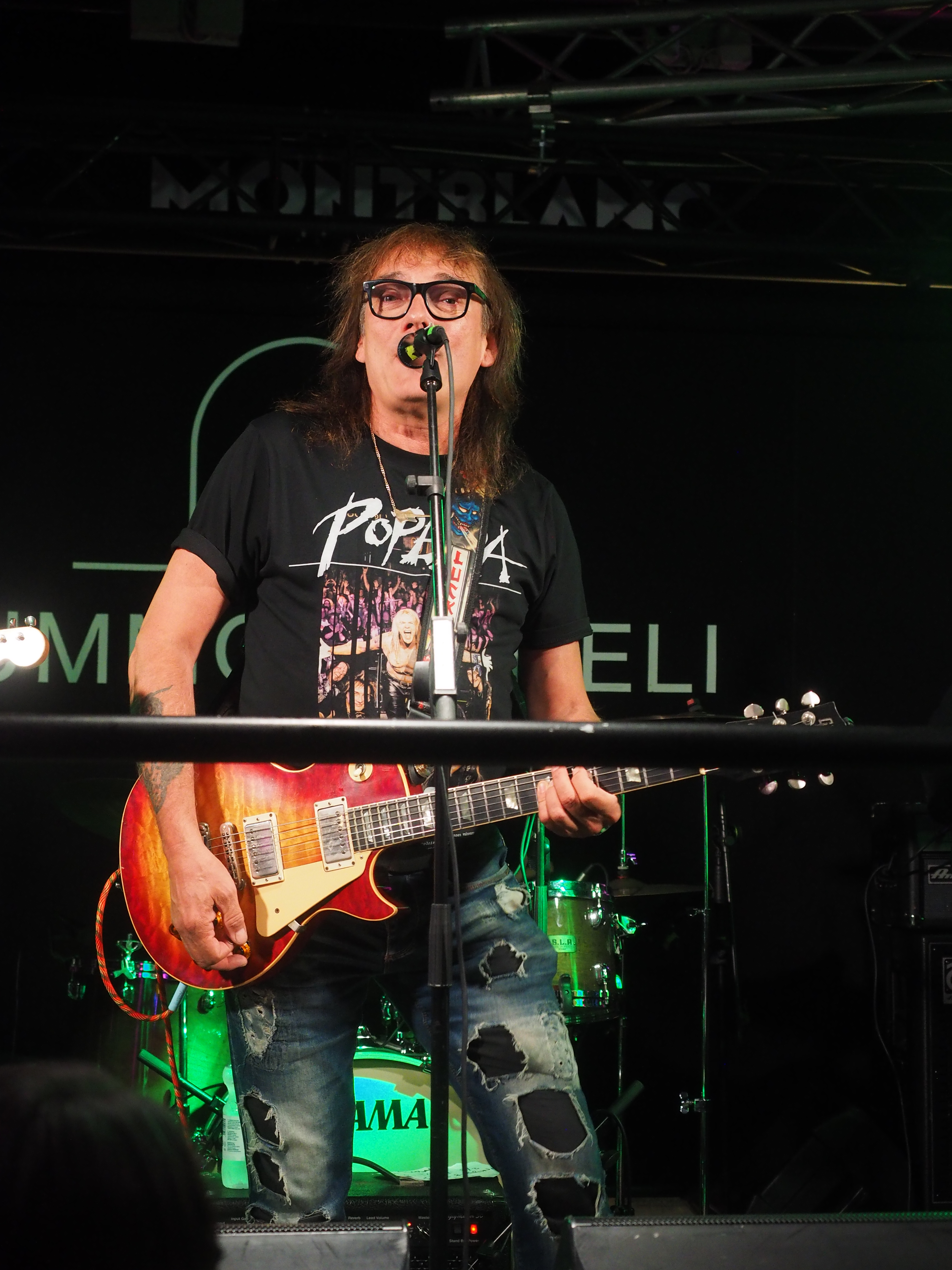
Costello Hautamäki in 2024

Vesa Pekka "Costello" Hautamäki (born 11 September 1963) is a Finnish musician and composer. He is known especially for his career as a guitarist with Finnish rock group Popeda, but he has also forged an international career with Hanoi Rocks as their guitarist during 2001–2003 and has actively performed and recorded as a solo artist.

Hautamäki's first group was Sensuuri, who were active between 1978 and 1981. Hautamäki joined Popeda in 1981 after graduating from high school. He made an impact on Popeda's singer and founding member Pate Mustajärvi by buying all of Popeda's earlier records before his first rehearsal with the group. The guitarist at the time, Arwo Mikkonen feared that Costello could take his place in Popeda, however after Hautamäki's arrival Mikkonen remained in the group for years, until his departure in 1986. After Mikkonen left, Hautamäki became Popeda's sole guitarist and frontman.

In the course of his career Hautamäki has released three solo albums. The first of these, A Little Bit Crazy was released in 1988 was followed by 13 Reasons to Rock in 2003. His third and only Finnish-language album, Kun mies unelmoi, was released on 8 March 2013.

Hautamäki has two children, sons Jimi and Alex "Allu" Hautamäki, who appeared in their own group Rockwall (Jimi on drums and Alex on bass). They have also played with Popeda at gigs and on several of their albums, as well as at their father's solo gigs. Since 2013 Hämeenlinna store Finlandia Instruments have produced a guitar called Costellobird (the Costello Bird) in his name, of which ten or so have been made so far.

== Discography ==
=== Solo albums ===
- A Little Bit Crazy (1988)
- 13 Reasons to Rock (2003)
- Kun mies unelmoi (2013)

=== Solo singles ===
- Mun sormuksein / Tuhat yötä (1985)
- Aurinko valvoo (2012)
- Matka tuntemattomaan (2012)
- Pintakiilto (2013)
