= Another Hostile Takeover =

Studio album by Hanoi Rocks
- Released: 30 March 2005
- Recorded: 2004–2005
- Genre: Glam punk; hard rock
- Label: Major Leidén Productions
- Producer: The Muddy Twins (Michael Monroe & Andy McCoy)

Hanoi Rocks chronology
Twelve Shots on the Rocks (2003)	Another Hostile Takeover (2005)	Street Poetry (2007)

Singles from Another Hostile Takeover
- 1. "Back in Yer Face" Released: September 3rd, 2005

Professional ratings
Review scores
Source	Rating
Allmusic	3/5 stars

Another Hostile Takeover is the seventh studio album by the Finnish rock band Hanoi Rocks, released in 2005. This was the second album which the "reborn" Hanoi Rocks released in the new millennium. When it was released, critics praised the album, but fan reactions were mixed.

== Track listing ==
No.	Title	Writer(s)	Length
1.	"Intro"	Andy McCoy, Michael Monroe	0:05
2.	"Back in Yer Face"	Andy McCoy, Michael Monroe	3:34
3.	"Insert I"	Andy McCoy, Michael Monroe	0:15
4.	"Hurt"	Andy McCoy, Michael Monroe	3:53
5.	"The Devil in You"	Andy McCoy, Michael Monroe, DJ Alimo, DJ Control	3:34
6.	"Love"	Andy McCoy, Michael Monroe	2:33
7.	"Talk to the Hand"	Andy McCoy, Michael Monroe	3:38
8.	"Eternal Optimist"	Andy McCoy, Michael Monroe	3:30
9.	"Insert II"	Andy McCoy, Michael Monroe	0:05
10.	"No Compromise, No Regrets"	Michael Monroe, Wilder	4:00
11.	"Reggae Rocker"	Andy McCoy, Michael Monroe, DJ Alimo, DJ Control	4:18
12.	"You Make the Earth Move"	Andy McCoy, Michael Monroe	3:34
13.	"Insert III"	Andy McCoy, Michael Monroe	0:10
14.	"Better High"	Andy McCoy, Michael Monroe	3:20
15.	"Dear Miss Lonely Hearts"	Jimmy Bain, Phil Lynott	3:27
16.	"Insert IV"	Andy McCoy, Michael Monroe	0:12
17.	"Center of My Universe"	Andy McCoy, Michael Monroe	4:46

Japanese edition
No.	Title	Writer(s)	Length
18.	"Heaven Is Gonna Be Empty" (Japanese bonustrack)	Andy McCoy, Michael Monroe	2:41

== Personnel ==
Hanoi Rocks

- Michael Monroe – lead vocals, harmonica, saxophone, guitars, keyboards, bass, castanet, percussion, Jew's harp, drums
- Andy McCoy – lead, rhythm, acoustic and 12-string guitars, backing vocals, bouzouki, mandolin, clavinet
- Conny Bloom – lead and rhythm guitars, backing vocals
- Andy Christell – bass, backing vocals
- Lacu – drums, percussion

Additional musician

- Eepo Mänty-Sorvari – drums on track 15

== Charts ==
Chart (2005)	Peak position
Finnish Albums (Suomen virallinen lista)	5
Japanese Albums (Oricon)	51
