= Tavastia Club =

Rock club in Helsinki, Finland

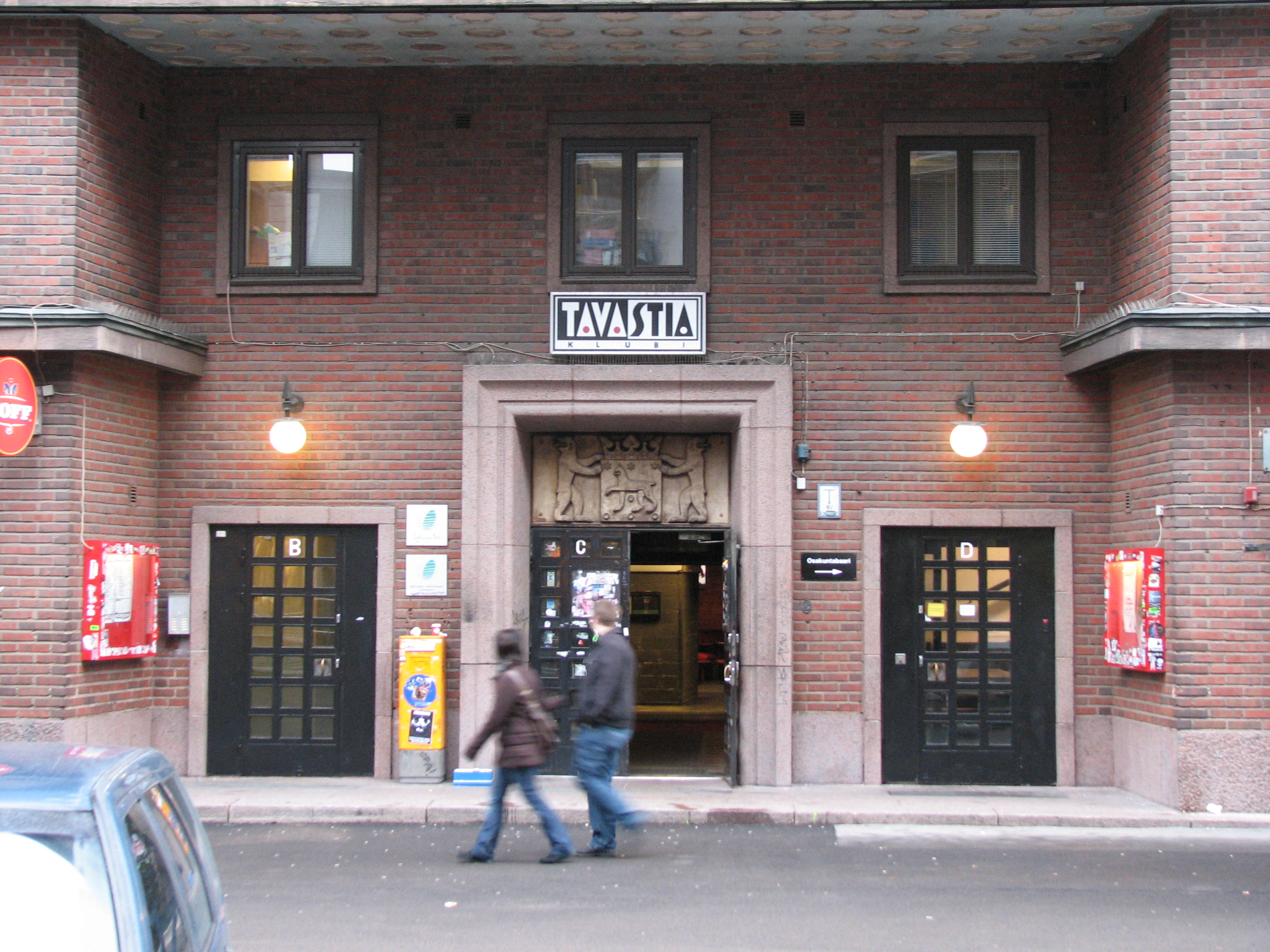
- Entrance on Urho Kekkosen katu
- Interactive map of Tavastia Club
- Address: Urho Kekkosen katu 4–6
- Location: Helsinki, Finland
- Coordinates: 60°10′06.9″N 024°55′58.5″E
- Owner: Helsingin Rock & Roll Oy
- Capacity: 700

Construction
- Built: 1931
- Opened: 1970

Website
- www.tavastiaklubi.fi

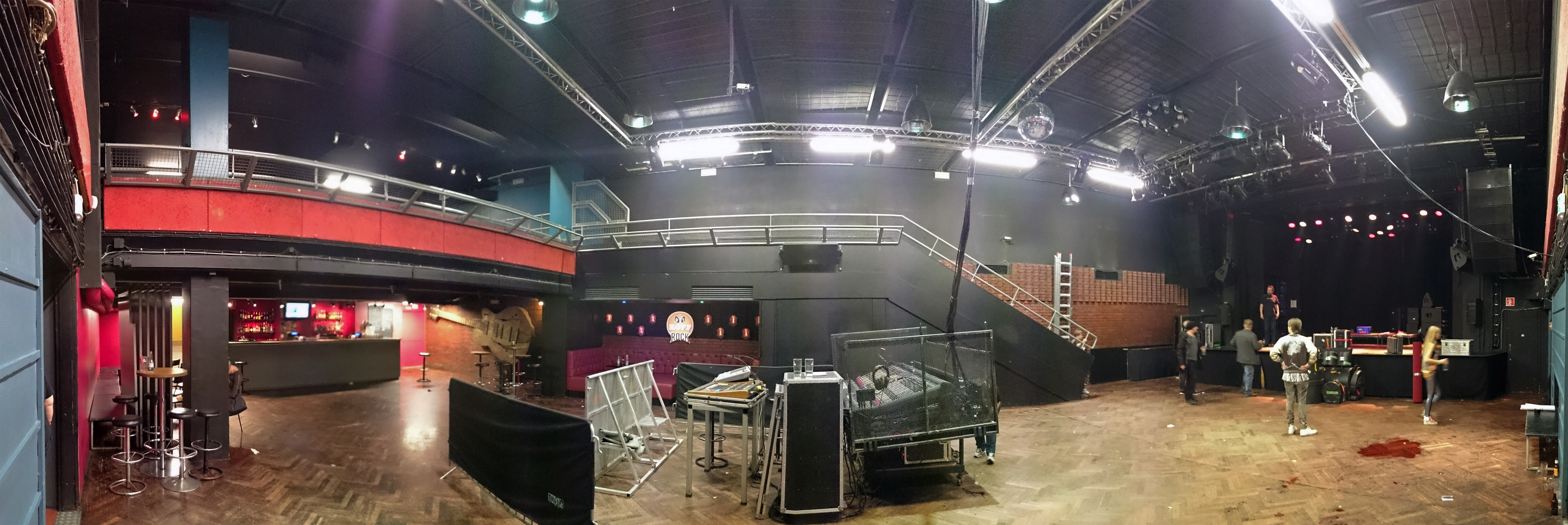
Panorama of Tavastia Club 2015.

The Tavastia Club (Finnish: Tavastia-klubi) is a popular rock music club in Helsinki, Finland. The house is owned by Hämäläis-Osakunta, one of the student nations at the University of Helsinki, but since 1991 the club has been operated by a private enterprise renting the house from the nation. It is located in central Helsinki Kamppi district on the street Urho Kekkosen katu. The capacity is 700 people.

== History ==
The house was built for the Tavastian nation as Hämäläisten talo ("Tavastians' house") in 1931. From early on, it was actively rented for entertainment purposes, including theater plays and dances. By the 1950s it had become a popular dance place and carried the slang name Hämis. During the 1960s the house started to concentrate more on rock music.

In 1970 the club was given the name Tavastia klubi. The programme included weekly jazz, rock and disco concerts. During the 1970s many bands, which would later become very famous in Finland and even abroad, rose to fame from the concerts in Tavastia. These include such acts as Hurriganes, Sleepy Sleepers, Wigwam and Dave Lindholm. During this time a few popular foreign acts played in the club as well, including Tom Waits, John Lee Hooker and Dr. Feelgood.

By the 1980s the club had achieved a legendary status in the Finnish rock music scene. In the 1980s more domestic bands rose to fame through Tavastia, most importantly Hanoi Rocks. Foreign visitors included Nico featuring Mad Sheer Khan, Sir Douglas Quintet, Fabulous Thunderbirds, Jason & The Scorchers, Dead Kennedys, The Ventures, Public Image Ltd, Pogues and Nick Cave.

The 1990s saw new popular domestic acts rise to fame from the stages of the club. These include Don Huonot, Kingston Wall and The 69 Eyes. In 1994 a "little brother" club Semifinal was opened in the basement of Tavastia to cater for the "rising star" bands and other smaller acts. For example, HIM played for the first time in the Tavastia's address in Semifinal when Ville Valo, the lead-singer to be, was still playing bass. Valo is said to have told the Tavastia's manager Juhani Merimaa that he would one day play a sold-out gig in the upstairs club. Valo kept his promise, and HIM went on to become one of the best selling acts in the history of Finnish music. Today, Tavastia is one of the oldest European rock music clubs that remain in continuous use.

== Artists who have performed at Tavastia Club ==
- The 69 Eyes
- 50 Cent
- AC/DC
- Alice In Chains
- Amoral
- Anthrax
- Antic Cafe
- Backyard Babies
- Beast in Black
- Black Crowes
- Black Sabbath
- Billy Talent
- Blind Channel
- The Breeders
- Celtic Frost
- Children Of Bodom
- Christian Death
- The Cramps
- The Cross
- D.A.D.
- Dead Kennedys
- The Dubliners
- Europe
- Fabulous Thunderbirds
- Dir en grey
- Dr. Alban
- Foo Fighters
- The Gazette
- Girlschool
- Hanoi Rocks
- Hawkwind
- The Hellacopters
- HIM
- The Hives
- The Hooters
- Hurriganes
- Joker Out
- Kalmah
- Kamelot
- Kiuas
- Litku Klemetti
- Kreator
- Käärijä
- Lemonheads
- London After Midnight
- Lordi
- Machinae Supremacy
- Manfred Mann's Earth Band
- Nazareth
- New York Dolls
- Nick Cave and the Bad Seeds
- Nightwish
- The Offspring
- The Pogues
- Public Image Limited
- Ramones
- Reckless Love
- Santa Cruz
- Screaming Trees
- Brian Setzer
- Siouxsie and the Banshees
- Sonic Youth
- The Sisters of Mercy
- The Stone Roses
- Stratovarius
- Stryper
- Suede
- The Wailers
- Tom Waits
- Two Witches
- W.A.S.P.
- Sonata Arctica

== See also ==
- Finnish rock
- Kaivohuone
