= Conny Bloom =

Swedish guitarist and songwriter

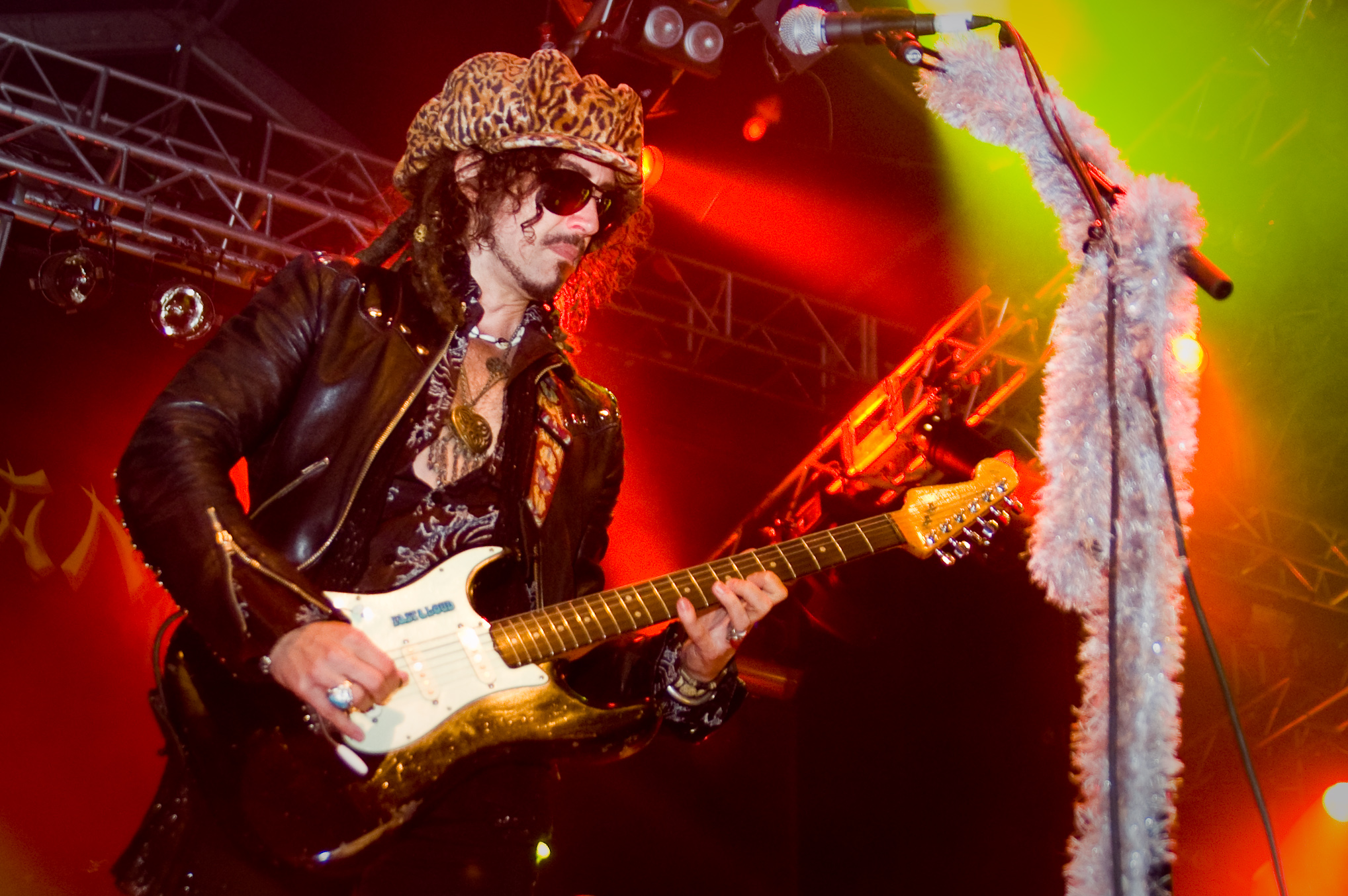
- Bloom performing with Hanoi Rocks at Ilosaarirock 2008 festival

Background information
- Also known as: Conny Bloom
- Born: Conny Blomquist; 23 November 1964 (age 61); Stockholm, Sweden
- Genres: Rock, heavy metal
- Occupations: Musician, songwriter
- Instruments: Guitar, vocals
- Years active: 1974–present
- Labels: Polygram, Music For Nations, Polar Music
- Website: Connybloom.com

Conny Bloom is the stage name for Ulf Conny Blomqvist, (born 23 November 1964 in Stockholm) who is a Swedish guitarist and songwriter. He is best known as the frontman for the funk metal band, Electric Boys. Bloom also served a stint as a guitarist of the Finnish rock band Hanoi Rocks and in Silver Ginger 5.

== Career ==
Bloom began working in the musical arena and teamed up first with bassist Andy Christell, working as a duo, with Bloom supplying the vocals and guitar to Christell's bass guitar. They were signed by Polygram and scored a local Swedish hit with the single "All Lips and Hips" in 1988. With guitarist Franco Santunione and drummer Niklas Sigevall, they formed the band, the Electric Boys. Their sound was a unique, and a bit more funky rather than straight rock and roll. The band's debut, Funk-O-Metal Carpet Ride held a better balanced version of Bloom and Christell's first hit, and they moved on to record another, Groovus Maximus, which never outdistanced their debut, and finally, after a change in lineup with the guitarist and drummer who had joined the duo leaving for new replacements, Freewheelin was released, but without much better critical or commercial success.

He is somewhat of a celebrity in Sweden and has also, especially with Electric Boys and later Silver Ginger 5, gained some international attention. After joining Hanoi Rocks, in 2004, however, Bloom has put his other projects in hold. He is also known in the UK for starring in an advert for Jameson Irish Whiskey.

== Discography ==
=== Solo ===
- 1996 Titanic Truth (as Conny Bloom's Titanic Truth)
- 1999 Psychonaut
- 2006 Been There, Done What? Live
- 2016 Fullt Upp
- 2020 Game! Set! Bloom!

=== Electric Boys ===
==== Albums ====
- 1990 Funk-O-Metal Carpet Ride
- 1992 Groovus Maximus
- 1994 Freewheelin'
- 2011 And Them Boys Done Swang
- 2014 Starflight United
- 2018 The Ghostward Diaries
- 2021 Upside Down
- 2023 Grand Explosivos

==== Singles ====
- 1988 "All Lips 'N Hips" (original version; only became a hit in Sweden)
- 1990 "All Lips 'N Hips"
- 1990 "Psychedelic Eyes"
- 1992 "Mary in the Mystery World"
- 1992 "Groovus Maximus"
- 1992 "Dying to be Loved"
- 1994 "Ready To Believe"

==== Other Recordings ====
- King Kong Song – ABBA cover for the 1992 Swedish ABBA tribute album "ABBA: The Tribute", released on the Polar Music label.

=== with Hanoi Rocks ===
==== Albums ====
- 2005 Another Hostile Takeover
- 2007 Street Poetry
