= Twelve Shots on the Rocks =

Studio album by Hanoi Rocks
- Released: 29 November 2002
- Recorded: 2002
- Genre: Glam punk; hard rock
- Label: Major Leidén Productions (Finland), Liquor and Poker Music (US)
- Producer: The Muddy Twins (Michael Monroe & Andy McCoy), Petri Majuri, Ian Vincent

Hanoi Rocks chronology
| The Best of Hanoi Rocks (1985) | Twelve Shots on the Rocks (2002) | Another Hostile Takeover (2005) |

Singles from Twelve Shots on the Rocks
- 1. "People Like Me" Released: 22 April 2002; 2. "A Day Late, a Dollar Short" Released: 2003

Professional ratings
Review scores
| Source | Rating |
|---|---|
| AllMusic | 3/5 stars |

Twelve Shots on the Rocks is the sixth studio album by the Finnish rock band Hanoi Rocks, released in 2002, however it was their first studio album since the band's break-up in 1985. Critical and commercial acclaim for the album exceeded expectations and the album went Gold in their native Finland. The CD was issued twice. The first issue in Finland had 13 tracks and a different mix to the North American release; further, the latter had 17 tracks.

== Track listing Finnish pressing ==
1. "Intro" – 0:28
2. "Obscured" (Juan Amaral, Hector Fernandez, Gaby Zero, Michael Monroe, Jude Wilder) – 4:06
3. "Whatcha Want" (Monroe, Wilder) – 4:17
4. "People Like Me" (Andy McCoy, Monroe) – 2:58
5. "In My Darkest Moment" (McCoy, Monroe) – 4:23
6. "Delirious" (Gary Holton, Monroe, Ronnie Thomas, Wilder, Williams) – 3:15
7. "A Day Late, a Dollar Short" (McCoy) – 3:08
8. "New York City" (Monroe, Wilder) – 4:04
9. "Winged Bull" (Daryl Hall) – 4:27
10. "Watch This" (Monroe, Wilder) – 3:46
11. "Gypsy Boots" (McCoy, Monroe) – 4:12
12. "Lucky" (McCoy, Monroe) – 3:22
13. "Designs on You" (Monroe, Wilder) – 10:30

== Track listing North American pressing ==
1. "Intro" – 0:28
2. "Obscured" (Amaral, Fernandez, Gutierres, Monroe, Wilder) – 4:06
3. "Bad News" (Martin) – 3:48
4. "New York City" (Monroe, Wilder) – 4:04
5. "Delirious" (Holton, Monroe, Thomas, Wilder, Williams) – 3:15
6. "A Day Late, a Dollar Short" (McCoy) – 3:08
7. "In My Darkest Moment" (McCoy, Monroe) – 4:23
8. "People Like Me" (McCoy, Monroe) – 2:58
9. "Whatcha Want" (Monroe, Wilder) – 4:17
10. "Moonlite Dance" (Monroe, McCoy) – 2:55
11. "Gypsy Boots" (McCoy, Monroe) – 4:12
12. "Lucky" (McCoy, Monroe) – 3:22
13. "Watch This" (Monroe, Wilder) – 3:46
14. "Designs on You" (Monroe, Wilder) – 10:30
15. "L.A.C.U." – (Lacu) – 0:18
16. "Are You Lonely Tonight?" (DeVille) – 3:09
17. "Winged Bull (Hall) – 4:28

== Personnel ==
Hanoi Rocks

- Michael Monroe – lead vocals, saxophone, harmonica, guitars, keyboards, percussion
- Andy McCoy – guitars, backing vocals
- Costello Hautamäki – guitars, backing vocals
- Timpa – bass, backing vocals
- Lacu – drums, percussion

== Charts ==
| Chart (2002) | Peak position |
|---|---|
| Finnish Albums (Suomen virallinen lista) | 5 |
| Japanese Albums (Oricon) | 27 |
