= I Live Too Fast to Die Young! =

Studio album by Michael Monroe
- Released: 10 June 2022
- Recorded: November–December 2021
- Studio: Inkfish Studios
- Length: 37:12
- Label: Silver Lining Music

Michael Monroe chronology
One Man Gang (2019)	I Live Too Fast to Die Young! (2022)

I Live Too Fast to Die Young! is the tenth studio album by Finnish rock singer Michael Monroe. It was released on 10 June 2022 by Silver Lining Music.

== Track listing ==
I Live Too Fast to Die Young! track listing
No.	Title	Writer(s)	Length
1.	Murder the Summer of Love	Jones	3:30
2.	Young Drunks & Old Alcoholics	Jones	3:09
3.	Derelict Palace	Jones	4:45
4.	All Fighter	Jones	2:36
5.	Everybody's Nobody	Monroe, Jones	3:33
6.	Antisocialite	Jones	3:28
7.	Can't Stop Falling Apart	Jones	3:04
8.	Pagan Prayer	Conte	2:32
9.	No Guilt	Monroe, Jones	3:25
10.	I Live Too Fast to Die Young	Jones	3:10
11.	Dearly Departed	Monroe, Crane	4:42

2xCD Japanese Edition "Live! Too Fast To Die Young In Stockholm"

No.	Title
2-1	This Ain't No Love Song
2-2	Old King's Road
2-3	Trick of the Wrist
2-4	'78
2-5	Ballad of the Lower East Side
2-6	Man with No Eyes
2-7	Horns and Halos
2-8	Goin Down with the Ship
2-9	Nothin's Alright
2-10	Hammersmith Palais
2-11	Dead, Jail or Rock'n'Roll

== Personnel ==
Musicians

- Michael Monroe – lead vocals, harmonica
- Steve Conte – guitar, vocals
- Rich Jones – guitar, vocals
- Karl Rockfist – drums
- Sami Yaffa – bass, vocals, guitar

Additional musicians

- Slash – guitar solo and additional guitars on "I Live Too Fast to Die Young"
- Lenni-Kalle Taipale – piano on "Antisocialite" and "Can't Stop Falling Apart"
- Suvi Aalto and Astrid Nicole – additional backing vocals on "Can't Stop Falling Apart" and "Murder the Summer of Love"
- Neil Leyton – additional backing vocals on "Everybody's Nobody", "Murder the Summer of Love", and "All Fighter"

Production

- Erno "Error" Laitinen – recording, mixing, producer
- Michael Monroe – producer
- Rich Jones – producer, artwork and design
- Sami Yaffa – producer
- Steve Conte – producer
- Karl Rockfist – producer
- Svante Forsback – mastering
- Bobby Nieminen – additional recording
- John Ewing – engineered Slash's guitars (track 7)

== Charts ==
Chart performance for I Live Too Fast to Die Young!
Chart (2022)	Peak position
Finnish Albums (Suomen virallinen lista)	2
Swiss Albums (Schweizer Hitparade)	76
