= Another Night in the Sun: Live in Helsinki =

Live album by Michael Monroe
- Released: 5 October 2010
- Recorded: 6 July 2010
- Venue: Tavastia Club, Helsinki
- Genre: Hard rock, punk rock, glam punk
- Label: Spinefarm

Michael Monroe chronology
Whatcha Want (2003)	Another Night in the Sun: Live in Helsinki (2010)	Sensory Overdrive (2011)

Another Night in the Sun: Live in Helsinki is the first live album by Finnish glam rock singer Michael Monroe, released on 5 October 2010, through Spinefarm Records. It is Monroe's first album with his new live backing band formed in early 2010 (which includes former Hanoi Rocks bassist Sami Yaffa), and first solo release since Hanoi Rocks' final break-up/retirement in 2009.

The live show was recorded on 6 July 2010 at the Tavastia Club in Helsinki, and features songs from Monroe's solo career, as well as songs from his tenure with Hanoi Rocks and Demolition 23, and a few covers.

The album was mixed by famed American producer and sound engineer Niko Bolas who has previously worked with such artists as Neil Young and Kiss, and mastered by Grammy-winning engineer Richard Dodd, who has previously worked with Tom Petty and the Dixie Chicks.

== Track listing ==
No.	Title	Length
1.	"Nothin's Alright" (Demolition 23 cover)
2.	"Motorvatin'" (Hanoi Rocks cover)
3.	"Hammersmith Palais" (Demolition 23 cover)
4.	"You're Next"
5.	"Not Fakin' It" (Nazareth cover)
6.	"Dysfunctional" (Demolition 23 cover)
7.	"I Wanna Be Loved" (Johnny Thunders cover)
8.	"Love Song" (The Damned cover)
9.	"Machine Gun Etiquette" (The Damned cover)
10.	"Motorheaded for a Fall"
11.	"Back to Mystery City" (Hanoi Rocks cover)
12.	"Malibu Beach Nightmare" (Hanoi Rocks cover)
13.	"Dead, Jail or Rock 'n' Roll"
14.	"Ain't Nothin' to Do" (The Dead Boys cover)
15.	"1970" (The Stooges cover)

== Personnel ==
- Michael Monroe - lead vocals, harmonica, saxophone
- Ginger Wildheart - guitar, vocals
- Steve Conte - guitar, vocals
- Sami Yaffa - bass, vocals
- Karl Rosqvist - drums, percussion
