= One Man Gang (album) =

Studio album by Michael Monroe
- Released: 18 October 2019
- Recorded: March 2018
- Studio: E-Studios in Sipoo, Finland
- Genre: Rock, punk rock, glam rock
- Length: 39:33
- Label: Silver Lining Music
- Producer: Michael Monroe, Rich Jones, Steve Conte

Michael Monroe chronology
Blackout States (2015)	One Man Gang (2019)	I Live Too Fast to Die Young! (2022)

Singles from One Man Gang
- 1. "One Man Gang" Released: 30 July 2019; 2. "Last Train to Tokyo" Released: 5 September 2019

One Man Gang is the ninth solo studio album by Finnish rock singer Michael Monroe. It was released on 18 October 2019 by Silver Lining Music.

== Singles ==
The first single, "One Man Gang", was released on 30 July 2019. On 5 September 2019, "Last Train to Tokyo" was released as the second single.

== Track listing ==
No.	Title	Writer(s)	Length
1.	"One Man Gang"	Rich Jones	2:24
2.	"Last Train to Tokyo"	Rich Jones, Steve Conte	2:57
3.	"Junk Planet"	Steve Conte	3:43
4.	"Midsummer Nights"	Steve Conte, Rich Jones	4:03
5.	"The Pitfalls of Being an Outsider"	Rich Jones	2:59
6.	"Wasted Years"	Rich Jones	2:56
7.	"In the Tall Grass"	Rich Jones	3:24
8.	"Black Ties and Red Tape"	Rich Jones	2:07
9.	"Hollywood Paranoia"	Rich Jones, Steve Conte	3:10
10.	"Heaven Is a Free State"	Michael Monroe	3:10
11.	"Helsinki Shakedown"	Rich Jones	3:58
12.	"Low Life in High Places"	Rich Jones	4:36

== Personnel ==
Musicians

- Michael Monroe – lead vocals
- Steve Conte – guitars
- Rich Jones – guitars
- Sami Yaffa – bass
- Karl Rockfist – drums

Production

- Michael Monroe – producer
- Rich Jones – producer, artwork
- Steve Conte – producer
- Petri Majuri – recording, mixing
- Bobby Nieminen – photography
