= Blackout States =

Studio album by Michael Monroe
- Released: 9 October 2015
- Genre: Rock, punk rock, glam rock
- Length: 41:56
- Label: Spinefarm
- Producer: Chips Kiesbye

Michael Monroe chronology
Horns and Halos (2013)	Blackout States (2015)	One Man Gang (2019)

Singles from Blackout States
- 1. "Old King's Road" Released: 4 September 2015; 2. "Goin' Down with the Ship" Released: 10 February 2016

Blackout States is the eighth solo studio album by Finnish rock singer Michael Monroe. It was released on 9 October 2015 by Spinefarm Records.

== Singles ==
The first single, "Old King's Road", was released on 4 September 2015. On 10 February 2016, "Goin' Down with the Ship" was released as the second single.

== Track listing ==
No.	Title	Writer(s)	Length
1.	"This Ain't No Love Song"	Steve Conte, Rich Jones	2:38
2.	"Old King's Road"	Conte, Jones, Sami Yaffa	3:23
3.	"Goin' Down with the Ship"	Conte, Jones	4:26
4.	"Keep Your Eye on You"	Conte, Jones	3:35
5.	"The Bastard's Bash"	Conte, Michael Monroe	3:57
6.	"Good Old Bad Days"	Monroe	3:15
7.	"R.L.F."	Monroe, Yaffa	2:13
8.	"Blackout States"	Conte, Jones	4:07
9.	"Under the Northern Lights"	Dee Dee Ramone	2:35
10.	"Permanent Youth"	Conte, Monroe, Jones	3:07
11.	"Dead Hearts on Denmark Street"	Conte, Jones	2:45
12.	"Six Feet in the Ground"	Conte, Jones	2:52
13.	"Walk Away"	Conte	3:03

Vinyl LP
No.	Title	Writer(s)	Length
14.	"Break the Noose"	Conte

== Personnel ==
Musicians

- Michael Monroe – lead vocals
- Steve Conte – guitars
- Rich Jones – guitars
- Sam Yaffa – bass
- Karl Rockfist – drums

Production

- Rich Jones - artwork
- Ville Juurikkala - photography
- Chips Kiesbye - producer
- Petri Majuri - mixing
