= The Zeros =

The Zeros may refer to:

- The Zeros (American band), a San Diego punk rock band formed in 1976
- The Zeros (American glam punk band), a Los Angeles band 1982–1997
- The Zeros (English band), a punk rock band formed in 1977
- The Zeros (film), an American film of 2001

== See also ==
- 2000s (decade), the decade from 2000 through 2009
- Zero (disambiguation)
