= Demolition 23 (album) =

1994 studio album by Demolition 23

Demolition 23.

Studio album by Demolition 23.
- Released: 1994
- Recorded: 1993
- Studio: Power Station Studios
- Genre: Punk Rock
- Length: 37:17
- Label: Music For Nations, Renegade Nation
- Producer: Steven Van Zandt

Demolition 23 is the self-titled debut album from the American/Finnish rock band Demolition 23. The album was released in 1994 in Europe on the Music for Nations label, and in Japan on the Renegade Nation Label. Re-released in 2022 on Van Zant's Wicked Cool Records Music videos were made for the songs "Nothin's Alright" and "Hammersmith Palais".

== Track listing ==
Demolition 23. track listing
No.	Title	Writer(s)	Length
1.	"Nothin's Alright"	Monroe, Van Zandt, Wilder	3:28
2.	"Hammersmith Palais	Monroe, Van Zandt, Wilder	3:59
3.	The Scum Lives On	Monroe, Van Zandt, Wilder	3:39
4.	Dysfunctinoal	Monroe, Van Zandt, Wilder	4:24
5.	Ain't Nothin' To Do	Chrome, Bator	2:34
6.	I Wanna Be Loved	Johnny Thunders	2:37
7.	You Crucified Me	Monroe, Van Zandt, Wilder	5:27
8.	Same Shit Different Day	Monroe, Van Zandt, Widler	3:22
9.	Endangered Species	Harper, Garratt	3:35
10	Deadtime Stories	Monroe, Wilder	4:12

2022 Reissue, Remastered Bonus Tracks
No.	Title	Writer(s)	Length
11.	Hammersmith Palais (demo)	Monroe, Van Zandt, Wilder	4:12
12.	Dysfunctional (demo)	Monroe, Van Zandt, Wilder	4:38
13.	The Scum Lives On (demo)	Monroe, Van Zandt, Wilder	4:07

== Personnel ==
Musicians

- Michael Monroe - lead vocals, harmonica
- Jay Hening - guitar, backing vocals
- Sami Yaffa - bass, backing vocals
- Jimmy Clark - drums, backing vocals

Additional Musicians

- Steven Van Zandt - backing vocals
- Kory Clarke - backing vocals
- Jude Wilder - backing vocals

Production

- Steven Van Zandt - producer
- George Marino - mastering
- Ben Fowler - recording, mixing

== Charts ==
Chart performance for Demolition 23.
Year	Chart	Position
1994	Japan Oricon	33
2022	Finnish albums chart	8
