= Cold Blue Rebels =

American psychobilly band

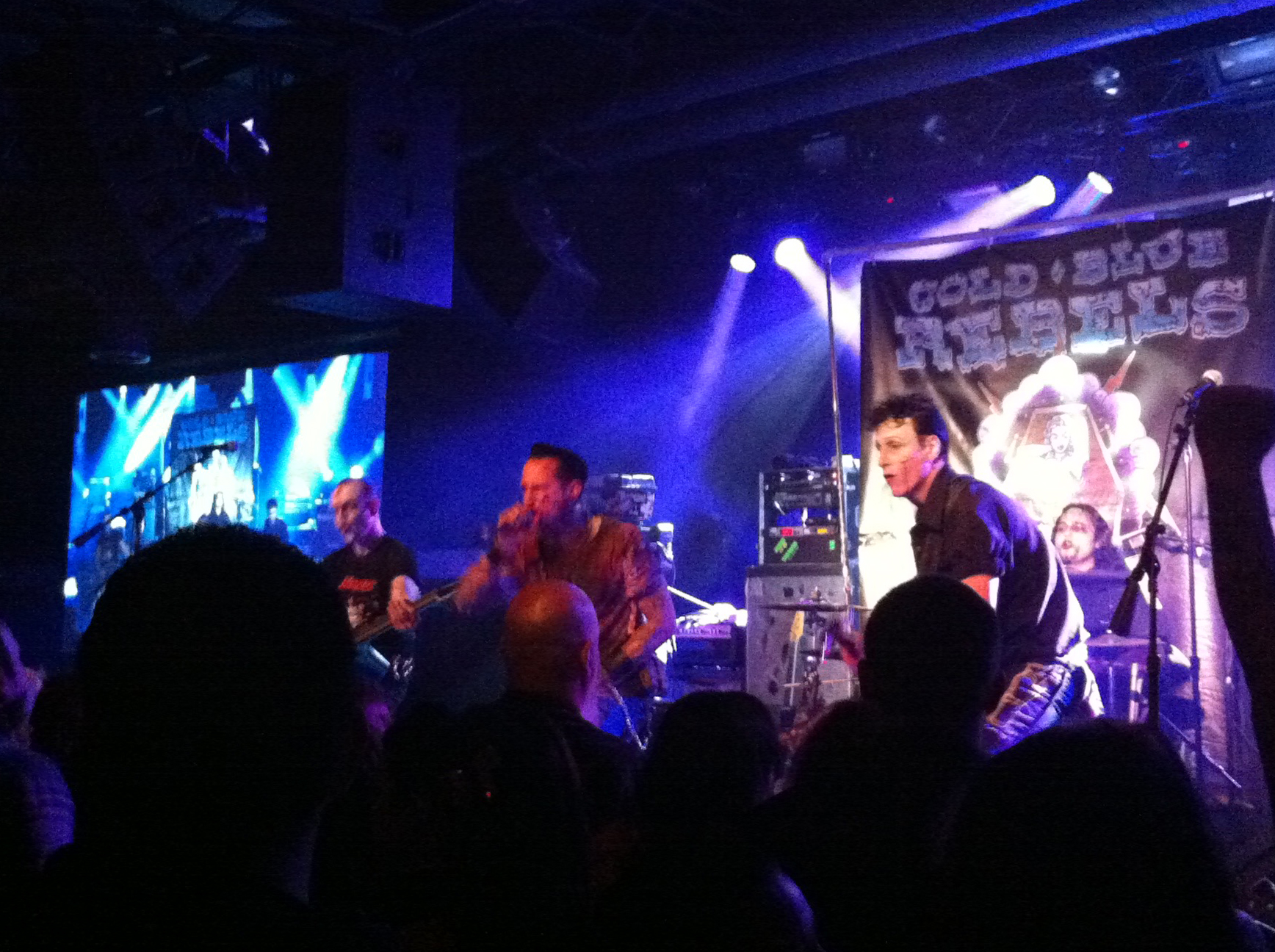
- COLD BLUE REBELS performing in Las Vegas, Nevada on February 28, 2013

Background information
- Origin: Los Angeles, California
- Genres: Psychobilly; punk rock
- Years active: 2009–present
- Labels: Horror High; Rankoutsider Records
- Members: Mickey Finn; Joe “Normal” Hutchinson; Danny “Dangerous” Lucas; Spazz Draztik
- Past members: Al “Diablo” Serrato; Thunders Inazuma
- Website: coldbluerebels.com

Cold Blue Rebels is an American four piece psychobilly band from Los Angeles, California, formed in 2009 by members of Jetboy, The Zeros and Glamour Punks. To date, the band has released two albums and one digital EP.

== History ==
Cold Blue Rebels was formed in 2009 by bassist Danny Dangerous, vocalist Mickey Finn, guitarist Joe Normal and drummer vocalist Spazz Draztik. The band played their debut show on November 28, 2009, in Downtown Los Angeles

In October 2011, it was announced that the band had completed work on their debut album, “Blood, Guts, n’ Rock & Roll”, for a January 2011 release. The band promoted its release by releasing the video "Hell Block 13".

Cold Blue Rebels performed at a special 40th-anniversary party for Rainbow Bar and Grill on Sunday, April 15, 2012. They performed at the Whisky a Go Go as part of Sunset Strip Music Festival on August 18, 2012.

Cold Blue Rebels released their second album “Love Of The Undead” in 2012, and were added as special guests to two separate legs of Wednesday 13’s “Curse The Living” tour.

In 2015, drummer Al Diablo joined Micky Finn a member of Jetboy.

On October 18, 2019, Cold Blue Rebels announced the release of their EP “The House That Frank Built” to commemorate the band's 10 year anniversary. This also marked the return of original drummer Spazz Draztik.

== Band members ==
- Mickey Finn - lead vocals
- Danny Dangerous - bass, vocals
- Joe Normal - guitar
- Spazz Draztik - drums

Former members

- Al Diablo - drums (2012–2018)
- Thunders Inazuma - guitar (2013)

== Discography ==
- Blood, Guts N' Rock & Roll (2012)
- Love Of The Undead (2014)
- The House That Frank Built (2019)
