= Take Them and Break Them =

EP by Michael Monroe
- Released: April 24, 2002
- Genre: Hard rock, glam punk, glam metal
- Label: Nippon Crown
- Producer: Michael Monroe

Michael Monroe chronology
Life Gets You Dirty (1999)	Take Them and Break Them (2002)	Whatcha Want (2003)

Take Them and Break Them is a collection of songs by Finnish glam rock singer Michael Monroe, released on April 24, 2002. It was released only in Japan. The EP features six tracks: two exclusive studio tracks and four live tracks, and was released through the Japanese label Nippon Crown.

Three of the live tracks: "Where's the Fire John?", "Relationship Wrecked" and "Make It Go Away", have previously appeared on Monroe's 1996 album Peace of Mind. The fourth live track, "Just Because You're Paranoid", has appeared on the 1999 album Life Gets You Dirty.

== Track listing ==
No.	Title	Length
1.	"Take Them and Break Them" (The Wanderers cover)
2.	"Back Biter" (The Ruts cover)
3.	"Make It Go Away" (live)
4.	"Where's the Fire John?" (live)
5.	"Just Because You're Paranoid" (live)
6.	"Relationship Wrecked" (live)
