= Kickin' Valentina =

American rock band

- Origin: Atlanta, Georgia, United States
- Genre: Hard rock
- Years active: 2013-present
- Labels: Mighty Music, Highway 9
- Members: D.K. Revelle; Heber Pampillon; Chris Taylor; Jimmy Berdine
- Past members: Joe Edwards; Brian Bezotte
- Website: http://www.kickinvalentina.com/

Kickin' Valentina is an American rock band from Atlanta that currently consists of singer D.K. Revelle, guitarist Heber Pampillon, bassist Chris Taylor, and drummer Jimmy Berdine. The band is currently signed to the Danish record label Mighty Music.

== History ==
Kickin' Valentina formed in Atlanta in 2013. According to guitarist Heber Pampillon, the band got their name from a fetish porn star who kicked men in their testicles. The band released a self-titled extended play on October 19, 2013 through Highway 9 Records. The Super Atomic EP, also released through Highway 9, was released on April 28, 2015. Later in 2015, their first full-length album, also called Super Atomic, was released through Mighty Music. The album was produced by Andy Reilly, who has worked with artists like UFO, Asia, Bruce Dickinson, and London Quierboys. The follow-up to Super Atomic, titled Imaginary Creatures, was released on August 11, 2017, also through Mighty Music.

In July 2018, the band abruptly parted ways with lead singer Joe Edwards after Edwards pulled out of a tour of Germany with the band. Edwards was replaced by Stradlin' Rose singer Brian Bezotte, who was recommended by mutual friends of the band. After performing only a total of five shows, Bezotte was no longer a member of Kickin' Valentina. The band announced former Jetboy singer D.K. Revelle was Bezotte's replacement in January 2019. Edwards went on to join the band MotoRage.

The band's latest release, the Chaos in Copenhagen EP, was released on December 6, 2019. The EP will contain 3 new studio tracks and a live recording of their song "Get Ready".

Kickin Valentina is set to release their third full length studio album, The Revenge of Rock, in early 2021.

On October 30, 2020, Kickin Valentina released the first single and video from their forthcoming album. The single is called Somebody New, and has been well received by fans.

Their new album, Anthems from the Underground, was released on 28 August 2026.

== Members ==
=== Current members ===
- Heber Pampillon- Guitar (2013–present)
- Chris Taylor- Bass (2013–present)
- Jimmy Berdine- Drums (2013–present)
- D.K. Revelle- Lead vocals (2019–present)

=== Former members ===
- Joe Edwards- Lead vocals (2013-2018)
- Brian Bezotte- Lead vocals (2018)

== Discography ==
- Kickin' Valentina EP (2013, Highway 9)
- Super Atomic EP (2015, Highway 9)
- Super Atomic (2015, Mighty Music)
- Imaginary Creatures (2017, Mighty Music)
- Chaos in Copenhagen EP (2019, Mighty Music)
- The Revenge of Rock (2021, Mighty Music)
- Star Spangled Fist Fight (2024, Mighty Music)
- Anthems Of The Underground (2026, Mighty Music)
