= Horns and Halos =

Horns and Halos may refer to:

- Horns and Halos (Michael Monroe album)
- Horns and Halos (Andre Nickatina album)
- Horns and Halos (film)

== See also ==
- Halos & Horns
