= Michael Butler (musician) =

- Instrument: Bass

Michael Butler (born December 24, 1961) is an American musician and podcaster from San Francisco, California, United States.

He is well known for his popular podcast, The Rock and Roll Geek Show, one of the earliest podcasts and a featured program on Mevio (formerly PodShow), a podcasting start-up and Butler's employer from late 2005 to 2013 as Director of Programming. He left that company to start his own multimedia video production company, "MySourceTV", with business partner Laura Rose.

Butler plays bass guitar and performs vocals with his own band, American Heartbreak. He also previously played bass in the Florida hardcore band Stevie Stiletto, and thrash metal band Exodus. Since 2006 he has also been playing with the San Francisco band Jetboy, although he was kicked out of the band live on his podcast in early November 2009 after expressing disappointment and frustration that the drummer had just quit. In July 2009 Butler joined Ginger from the UK band Wildhearts, as well as former Cult bass player Billy Morrison, for shows at Los Angeles El Ray Theater and The Viper Room. Butler currently plays in a couple different coverbands including "The Butlers" & "FeatherWitch".

Aside from the Rock and Roll Geek Show, Butler also hosts several spin-off podcasts such as Cooking With Butler, Rock and Roll Geek Indie Cast, Bangin' With Butler, and Hairbanger's Ball.

In 2008 he started another podcast, The Good Clean Fun Show, in which he discusses the details of his week with his co-host Jasper Plan9. The show contains reoccurring comedy segments such as "The Beer of the Week" where beers are reviewed badly by a simpleton with no taste, and "What Would You Do For Love?" (in which hypothetical questions about Love\Sex\Marriage\Death are debated). This show pod-faded sometime in 2013.

In 2015 he started another podcast, Mad At Dad, with fellow podcaster Dave Slusher of The Evil Genius Chronicles.
