= Horns and Halos (Michael Monroe album) =

Studio album by Michael Monroe
- Released: 23 August 2013
- Genre: Rock
- Length: 36:26
- Label: Spinefarm

Michael Monroe chronology
Sensory Overdrive (2011)	Horns and Halos (2013)	Blackout States (2015)

Singles from Horns and Halos
- 1. "Ballad of the Lower East Side" Released: 16 April 2013; 2. "Eighteen Angels" Released: 9 August 2013; 3. "Stained Glass Heart" Released: 8 November 2013

Horns and Halos is the seventh solo studio album by Finnish rock singer Michael Monroe. It was released on 23 August 2013 by Spinefarm Records. Michael Monroe stated about the album title Horns and Halos: "We all have a bit of both within us – Yin and Yang, Devils and Angels etc. However – Love and Light always conquers the darkness in the end".

== Singles ==
Horns and Halos debuted at number one on the Official Finnish Albums Chart.

== Track listing ==
- Digital download

No.	Title	Writer(s)	Length
1.	"TNT Diet"	Dregen, Michael Monroe, Sami Yaffa, Steve Conte	2:28
2.	"Ballad of the Lower East Side"	Steve Conte	3:16
3.	"Eighteen Angels"	Dregen, Sami Yaffa, Steve Conte	3:28
4.	"Saturday Night Special"	Steve Conte	2:13
5.	"Stained Glass Heart"	Dregen, Steve Conte	4:21
6.	"Horns and Halos"	Dregen, Karl Rockfist, Michael Monroe, Sami Yaffa, Steve Conte	3:29
7.	"Child of the Revolution"	Dregen, Steve Conte	4:21
8.	"Soul Surrender"	Michael Monroe, Sami Yaffa, Steve Conte	3:47
9.	"Half the Way"	Michael Monroe, Sami Yaffa, Steve Conte	2:33
10.	"Ritual"	Michael Monroe, Sami Yaffa, Steve Conte	4:02
11.	"Hands Are Tied"	Dregen, Karl Rockfist, Sami Yaffa, Steve Conte	3:53

Special Edition
No.	Title	Writer(s)	Length
12.	"Happy Neverafter"	Steve Conte, Michael Monroe, Sami Yaffa	2:45
13.	"Don't Block the Sun"	Steve Conte	3:20

== Personnel ==
- Michael Monroe – lead vocals, sax, harmonica
- Steve Conte – guitars, main background vocals
- Dregen – guitars, background vocals
- Sam Yaffa – bass, background vocals
- Karl Rockfist – drums, background vocals

== Charts ==
Chart (2013)	Peak position
Finnish Albums (Suomen virallinen lista)	1
Swedish Albums (Sverigetopplistan)	34
