= Sensory Overdrive =

Studio album by Michael Monroe
- Released: 14 March 2011
- Recorded: September–October 2010
- Genre: Hard rock, punk rock, glam punk
- Length: 32:58
- Label: Spinefarm Records
- Producer: Jack Douglas

Michael Monroe chronology
Another Night in the Sun: Live in Helsinki (2010)	Sensory Overdrive (2011)	Horns and Halos (2013)

Sensory Overdrive is the sixth studio album by the Finnish glam rock singer Michael Monroe, released on 14 March 2011 through Spinefarm Records. It is Monroe's first studio album with his new backing band formed in early 2010, as well as his first studio solo album since the second break-up of his band Hanoi Rocks in 2009.

The album was produced by famed record producer Jack Douglas, who has previously worked with Aerosmith, John Lennon, Miles Davis and more. The cover features Monroe holding his eye open, "forced to watch the world in ruins and decay and I cannot shut [it]".

In the UK Rock Chart, the album reached #13. In Finland, ’’Sensory Overdrive’’ topped the albums chart on its first week of release and spent 22 weeks in the Top 40. The album reached gold status in December 2011 with sales exceeding 10 000 copies, making it Monroe’s most successful solo album in his native Finland. On 9 November 2011 ’’Sensory Overdrive’’ won the ”Album of the Year” award at the 2011 Classic Rock magazine awards. The first single, ´78´, from the album was chosen as the Rock Song Of The Year by iTunes USA and Little Steven's Underground Garage Radio Shows listeners voted ‘Trick Of The Wrist‘ the Coolest Song Of The Year. Debauchery As A Fine Art is the same song as the previously heard Motorheaded For A Fall (from the live album Another Night In The Sun) albeit with different lyrics.

== Track listing ==
No.	Title	Writer(s)	Length
1.	"Trick of the Wrist"	Michael Monroe, Ginger, Sami Yaffa, Steve Conte	2:20
2.	"'78"	Monroe, Ginger, Yaffa, Conte, Karl Rosqvist	3:14
3.	"Got Blood?"	Monroe, Ginger, Conte	2:38
4.	"Superpowered Superfly"	Ginger	2:41
5.	"Modern Day Miracle"	Monroe, Ginger, Yaffa, Conte	2:45
6.	"Bombs Away"	Monroe, Ginger, Yaffa, Conte, Rosqvist, Jack Douglas	3:35
7.	"All You Need"	Monroe, Ginger	3:07
8.	"Later Won't Wait"	Ginger	3:18
9.	"Gone Baby Gone" (featuring Lucinda Williams)	Monroe, Ginger, Yaffa	3:31
10.	"Center of Your Heart"	Ginger, Conte	2:46
11.	"Debauchery as a Fine Art" (featuring Lemmy)	Monroe, Lemmy	3:10

Deluxe Edition
No.	Title	Writer(s)	Length
12.	"Another Night in the Sun"	Monroe, Todd Youth	3:44
13.	"You're Next"	Monroe, Yaffa, Youth	3:05

Japanese Edition
No.	Title	Writer(s)	Length
14.	"Right to Be Wrong"	Monroe, Yaffa	3:00
15.	"Sleeping with The TV On"	Monroe	2:13

== Personnel ==
- Michael Monroe – lead vocals
- Ginger – guitar, vocals
- Steve Conte – guitar, vocals
- Sami Yaffa – bass
- Karl Rosqvist – drums, percussion

Additional personnel

- Lucinda Williams – vocals on "Gone Baby Gone"
- Lemmy – vocals on "Debauchery as a Fine Art"
