= Life Gets You Dirty =

Studio album by Michael Monroe
- Released: 12 October 1999
- Recorded: 1999
- Genre: Hard rock, glam punk, glam metal
- Length: 43:00
- Label: SPV/Steamhammer
- Producer: Michael Monroe, Dan Tigerstedt

Michael Monroe chronology
Peace of Mind (1996)	Life Gets You Dirty (1999)	Take Them and Break Them (2002)

Life Gets You Dirty is the fourth studio album by Finnish glam rock singer Michael Monroe, released on 12 October 1999, through the German label SPV GmbH.

== Track listing ==
All tracks are written by Michael Monroe and Jude Wilder except where noted

No.	Title	Writer(s)	Length
1.	"Life Gets You Dirty"		2:17
2.	"Just Because You're Paranoid"		3:07
3.	"Since When Did You Care?"		4:22
4.	"Self Destruction Blues" (Hanoi Rocks cover)	Michael Monroe, Andy McCoy	2:20
5.	"Always Never Again"		3:27
6.	"Go Hard"		4:00
7.	"I Send You Back"		4:24
8.	"What's With the World?"		4:59
9.	"Love and Light"		2:50
10.	"If the World Don't Want Me"		3:00
11.	"Little Troublemaker" (Ian McLagan cover)	Johnny Lee Schell	2:28
12.	"Not Bad for a White Boy (Shitmuthafucka)"		2:52
13.	"No Means No"		3:20
Total length:			43:30

== Personnel ==
- Michael Monroe - lead vocals, guitar, harmonica, saxophone, piano, tambourine
- Jari Paulamäki - bass, backing vocals
- Pete Lehtelä - drums, backing vocals
- Jude Wilder - backing vocals

== Reception ==
Gary Hill from AllMusic said it was an "entertaining album and just plain fun". He also complimented the disc for "a good blend of punk edginess and '80s metal sounds", and noted "it gets bluesy at times".
