= Neil Leyton =

Portuguese-Canadian singer and guitarist

- Born: Lisbon, Portugal
- Genres: Indie; glam rock
- Occupations: Musician; songwriter
- Instruments: Vocals; guitar
- Years active: 1990s–present
- Labels: Fading Ways; Feedback Boogie
- Formerly of: The Conscience Pilate

Neil Leyton is a Portuguese-Canadian singer and guitarist, born in Lisbon. He has lived and performed in Toronto, London and Stockholm.

He was a founding member and songwriter in Canadian art-glam indie project The Conscience Pilate from 1995 to 1998, beginning a solo career in 1999. He is also the founder of the Fading Ways record label, one of the first to use Creative Commons licenses. Leyton was a vocal proponent of the Creative Commons, giving several seminars and speaking at conferences about its possible uses in the music industry, including Music Tank (London) and Popkomm (Berlin).

He has also played guitar for other musical projects live and in the studio, most notably British glam rockers The Dogs D'Amour, Canadian rockers Crash Kelly (fellow Canadian musician Sean Kelly's band) and Canadian power pop outfit Galore. He participated in a side project with Ky Anto, titled Pretty Volume and recorded an EP, with fellow Canadian guitarist Rich Jones and The Wildhearts frontman Ginger in the UK. The Hellacopters's Nicke Andersson and Backyard Babies's guitarist Dregen were guests on Leyton's The Betrayal of the Self album, released in 2006 via Feedback Boogie and Fading Ways Records.

In December 2008, he released an exclusive fans-only new album, Metacognitive Apperceptions. Leyton has also produced several independent recording sessions for artists such as Mark Fernyhough and Maria Pettersson.

In 2009, he participated in a new side project with Nicke Andersson (of The Hellacopters), called The Point, releasing a 7″ vinyl single. He also co-wrote and sang on Andersson's debut solo album, Imperial State Electric (2010), on the track "Deja Vu".

At the end of 2010, he released the album Elite Nylon. In early 2011, AWAL released the compilation Out of Synch, featuring mostly acoustic material from Leyton's back-catalogue as well as some unreleased tracks.

In 2016, Portugal's Polk Salad Records re-issued Leyton's The Betrayal of the Self album via the Spanish Distributor Altafonte. Leyton also announced a new upcoming album from his new, Portugal-based project Lusitanian Ghosts, whose first single was titled "Blossom", recorded in the city of Setúbal.

== Discography ==
=== As leader ===
EPs

- My New Soul (Fading Ways/RCD 2001)
- Beat (Fading Ways 2004)
- Dead Fashion Brigade (Fading Ways 2005)

Albums

- Down Secret Avenue with the Last Lovers (Fading Ways, 1999)
- From the Brighter Side of Her Midnight Sun (Fading Ways, 2002 / ChangesOne, 2003)
- The Betrayal of the Self (Fading Ways / Feedback Boogie, 2006)
- A Reckoning (Fading Ways (UK, Canada, Finland) / Finetunes (Germany) / Kunaki (USA), 2007)
- Metacognitive Apperceptions (Fading Ways / Kunaki, 2008)
- Elite Nylon (Fading Ways Music Store / Finetunes, 2010)
- Out of Synch (Fabulous Generation / AWAL, 2011)

With Galore

- Parader (Riptide / EMI Music Canada, 2003)

With The Conscience Pilate

- Living in a Movie Scene (Fading Ways, 1996)
- Sunday Refugees (Guru Records, 1998)

With Pretty Volume

- Pretty Volume (Fading Ways / Finetunes / Kunaki, 2008)

With The Point

- "Give It a Try" (Fading Ways Finland, 2010) – 7″ single

With Lusitanian Ghosts

- "Blossom" (Lusitanian / Altafonte, 2014) – single
