= The Zeros (American glam punk band) =

American rock band

- From left to right: Sammy Serious, Mr. Insane, Danny Dangerous, Joe Normal.

Background information
- Also known as: The Double "O" Zeros
- Origin: Los Angeles, California, U.S.
- Genres: Glam metal, glam punk
- Years active: 1982–1997
- Labels: Restless Records; Mountain Records; Blammy Bros. Records
- Spinoffs: Cold Blue Rebels; Serious Suicide; Joe Normal & The Anytown'rs
- Past members: Sammy Serious; Joe "Normal" Hutchinson; Jim "Mr. Insane" Hutchinson; Danny Dangerous; Mace Byers; Toy Staci; Mick "Nasty" Jansen; John Rios

The Zeros, originally known as The Double "O" Zeros, were an American glam metal and glam punk band from New Jersey. Characterized by their matching purple hair, the band was a prominent figure on the Hollywood club scene of the late 1980s – early 1990s. In 1991 the band's record label Restless Records had the nightclubs Whisky a Go Go and Coconut Teaszer painted purple to commemorate the release of their album 4-3-2-1 The Zeros.

== History ==
=== As The Double "O" Zeros ===
The Double "O" Zeros formed in 1982 in New Jersey and consisted of lead vocalist Sammy Serious, guitarist Joe "Normal" Hutchinson, bassist Mace Byers and drummer Jimmy "Mr. Insane" Hutchinson.

The band gained greater exposure in 1984 when they recorded the theme song "H.O.W.A.R.D S.T.E.R.N." for radio personality Howard Stern, who used the track as the theme music for his radio show on WNBC and WXRK in New York City.

In early 1985 the band released a five-song 7-inch EP entitled "Be A Zero" on the then New Jersey–based independent record label Mountain Records. The band then temporarily relocated to the U.K. touring from the Spring to Fall of 1985.

=== As The Zeros ===
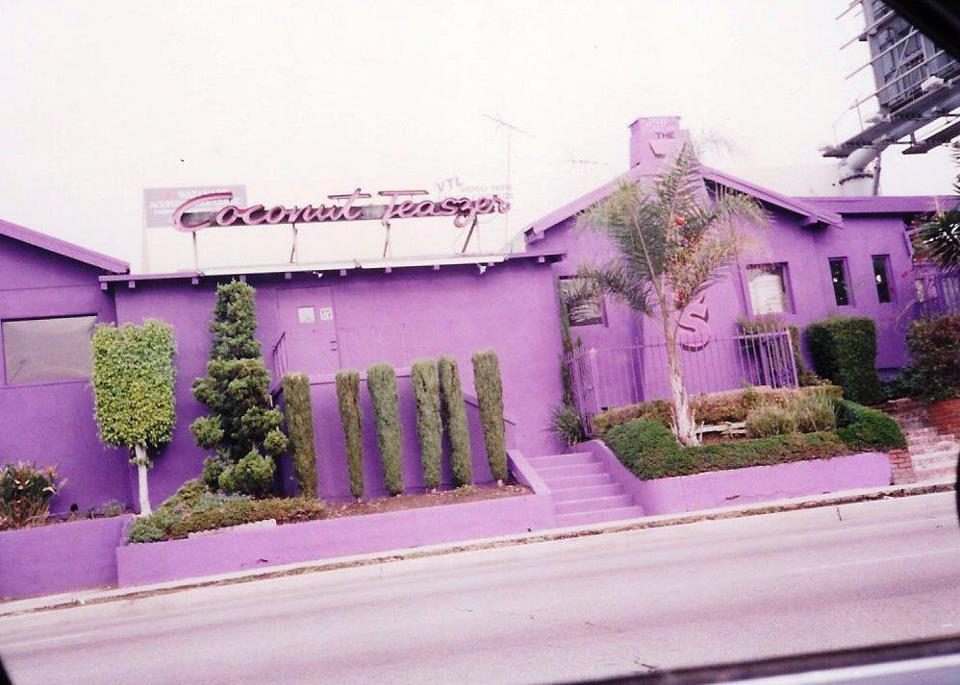
In 1991, the Coconut Teaszer was painted purple to promote the release of The Zeros' album "4-3-2-1 The Zeros".

Relocating to Los Angeles in 1986, the band shortened their name to The Zeros and were joined by bass player Danny Dangerous. Under the guidance of former Poison manager Howie Hubberman, The Zeros developed their image which was characterized by matching purple hair, custom made Converse thigh-high sneakers, and their hot-rodded classic 1968 Chevrolet Nomad Wagon 'Zeromobile'.

The band's local notoriety exploded when Danny Dangerous' childhood friend Butch Lukic began illustrating The Zeros' cartoon likeness which appeared in magazines, flyers, merchandise, and eventually the cover of the albums 4, 3, 2, 1 … Zeros and Rule The World.

In 1987, The Zeros appeared alongside Peter Noone of Herman's Hermits fame in an episode of the NBC sitcom Easy Street.

In 1988, The Zeros recorded the song "Mr. MX-7" with producer Nigel Harrison and guest vocalist Stiv Bators for the comedy film Tapeheads starring John Cusack. While the song was written by Sammy Serious, Stiv Bators is featured in the movie singing the song.

The Zeros placed two songs and performed in the 1989 movie Caged Fury starring actor Erik Estrada.

In 1991, The Zeros released their full-length album 4, 3, 2, 1 … Zero on Restless Records. To promote the album's release, Restless Records had both the Whisky A Go-Go and Coconut Teaszer painted purple and adorned with The Zeros' logo.

=== Post-break up (since 1997) ===
Sammy Serious formed the band Serious Suicide in 2000.

Joe Normal and Danny Dangerous formed the Psychobilly band Cold Blue Rebels with vocalist Mickey Finn of Jetboy and Spazz Draztik of Glamour Punks.

In May 2015, the albums 4, 3, 2, 1 … Zeros and Names (Vol. 1) were re-released by Warner Bros. Records

== Discography ==
=== Studio albums ===
Album	Year	Release Notes
4, 3, 2, 1 … Zeros	1991	Restless Records
Names (Vol. 1)	1993	Restless Records
Rule The World	1994	Blammy Bros. Records

=== EPs ===
- Another Girl / Pretty Woman (1983)
- Be A Zero! (1985)
- Sneak Preview (1991)

== Filmography ==
- Episode of Easy Street - "Our Kind of People" (1987)
- Tapeheads (1988)
- Caged Fury (1989)

== Past members ==
- Sammy Serious – lead vocals (1982–1997)
- Joe "Normal" Hutchinson – guitar (1982–1992)
- Jim "Mr. Insane" Hutchinson – drums (1982–1992)
- Danny "Dangerous" Lucas – bass, vocals (1986–1992)
- Toy Staci- bass (1992–1995)
- Mace Byers – bass (1985–1986)
- Andy James – touring drums 1992-1993
- Joey Foxx – touring drums (1996)
- Mick "Nasty" Jansen - drums, vocals (2024)
- John Rios - bass, vocals (2024)
- Deck - guitar (2024)
