= Nights Are So Long =

Studio album by Michael Monroe
- Released: 5 September 1987 (Japan)
- Recorded: North Lake Sound Studios, White Plains, New York
- Genre: Hard rock
- Length: 33:55
- Label: Yahoo!
- Producer: Michael Monroe, Craig Goetsch

Michael Monroe chronology
Nights Are So Long (1987)	Not Fakin' It (1989)

Professional ratings
Review scores
Source	Rating
AllMusic	4.5/5 stars

Nights Are So Long is the first studio album by singer Michael Monroe, released in 1987 through Yahoo! Records; a remastered edition was reissued in 2004 through Warner Music. It is Monroe's first post-Hanoi Rocks release, with Yahoo! being the record label of Hanoi Rocks' then-manager Seppo Vesterinen. Save for three tracks written by Monroe, the rest are mainly covers; his subsequent 1989 album, Not Fakin' It, would be the first to feature primarily original compositions. Monroe dedicated the album to Razzle, Hanoi Rocks' drummer, who was killed in a road accident in 1984.

== Track listing ==
No.	Title	Writer(s)	Length
1.	"She's No Angel"	Gary Holton	3:34
2.	"Million Miles Away"	Frank Secich	3:49
3.	"Shake Some Action"	Cyril Jordan, Chris Wilson	3:51
4.	"It's a Lie"	Jimmy Zero	4:06
5.	"High School"	Dennis Thompson, Fred "Sonic" Smith, Michael Davis, Rob Tyner, Wayne Kramer	3:09
6.	"Nights Are So Long"	Zero	3:29
7.	"Can't Go Home Again"	Michael Monroe, T.V. Lee	3:23
8.	"Too Rich to Be Good"	Monroe	3:29
9.	"You Can't Put Your Arms Around a Memory"	Johnny Thunders	1:34
10.	"Keep it Up"	Monroe	3:31
Total length:			33:55

== Personnel ==
- Michael Monroe – vocals, saxophone, harmonica, arrangements, production
- Phil "Wildman" Grande – lead, acoustic, rhythm and 12-string guitar
- T.V. Lee – rhythm guitar
- Klyph Black – slide guitar, bass, backing vocals
- Ian Hunter – piano
- Peter Clemente – drums, percussion, backing vocals
- Yul Vaz – additional guitar on "She's No Angel" and "Too Rich To Be Good"
- Tony Mercadante – fretless bass and backing vocals on "It's a Lie"
- Rob Sabino – keyboards on "It's a Lie"

Technical

- Eddie Solan – engineering
- Greg Calbi – mastering
- Craig Goetsch – production
