= Whatcha Want =

Studio album by Michael Monroe
- Released: January 21, 2003
- Recorded: 2002
- Studios: Seawolf Studios, Suomenlinna
- Genres: Hard rock, punk rock, glam punk
- Length: 40:23
- Label: SPV/Steamhammer
- Producer: Michael Monroe

Michael Monroe chronology
Take Them and Break Them (2002)	Whatcha Want (2003)	Another Night in the Sun: Live in Helsinki (2010)

Whatcha Want is the fifth studio album by Finnish glam rock singer Michael Monroe, released on January 21, 2003, through the German label SPV GmbH.

It was Monroe's first solo album since Hanoi Rocks' reunion in 2001, and was released just two months after Hanoi Rocks' comeback album Twelve Shots on the Rocks. A song Monroe has originally written for this album, entitled "Whatcha Want" (which also inspired the album's name) was eventually used for the Hanoi Rocks album Twelve Shots on the Rocks.

== Track listing ==
The album contained twelve songs.

No.	Title	Length
1.	"Do Anything You Wanna Do" (Eddie and the Hot Rods cover)	3:14
2.	"Right Here Right Now"	3:30
3.	"Stranded"	3:51
4.	"I Won't Lie Down and Die" (UK Subs cover)	2:20
5.	"Shattered Smile"	3:04
6.	"What Love Is" (The Dead Boys cover)	1:59
7.	"Germ Free Adolescents" (X-Ray Spex cover)	2:55
8.	"Life's a Bitch and Then You Live"	3:30
9.	"Telephone Bill Is All Mine" (Dave Lindholm cover)	3:56
10.	"Jimmy Brown" (The Boys cover)	3:43
11.	"Identity" (X-Ray Spex cover)	2:29
12.	"Hey Thats No Way to Say Goodbye" (Leonard Cohen cover)	2:59

== Personnel ==
- Michael Monroe - vocals, guitar, additional bass, piano, saxophone, harmonica, handclaps
- Timpa Laine - bass
- Pink Gibson - lead guitar, rhythm guitar, 12-string guitar, acoustic guitar, backing vocals
- Mr. T - keyboards
- Lacu Lahtinen - drums
- Dave Lindholm - lead guitar on "Telephone Bill is All Mine"
- Maria Hänninen - backing vocals on "Jimmy Brown"
