= The Yo-Yos =

British musical group

The Yo-Yos are a British rock and roll band, formed in 1998 by ex-The Wildhearts bassist, Danny McCormack and Tom Spencer (ex- Sugarsnatch / The Lurkers), after the two met at a Toy Dolls recording session. The Yo-Yo's recruited Andy Selway (Bladz) (ex- Sugarsnatch) on drums and guitarist Neil Phillips (B-Movie Heroes) to the band.

The Yo-Yo's recorded their first single, "Out Of My Mind", and then joined The Backyard Babies for a UK tour. Another single was then recorded, "Rumble(d)". The Yo-Yo's continued to tour the UK and were then signed by the US record label, Sub Pop.

On the Sub Pop label, the Yo-Yo's released their debut album, Uppers & Downers on CD and LP in 2000. Despite gaining a cult following as well a favourable coverage from the rock and indie press, they split up due to infighting among members.

Neil Phillips went on to play for Danny Frye & The Devildolls, and also return his concentration to his own B-Movie Heroes whilst Andy Selway went on to KMFDM. Neil Phillips released his debut solo album in July 2012 under the name Jackrabbit Parole. The album, It's a Long Way Back to the Drawing Board, was available on Front Room Records.

In 2005, the group reformed with a new line-up, that included McCormack and Spencer, along with Rich Jones on guitar. The band recorded a new EP, Given Up Giving Up and toured the UK supporting 3 Colours Red. The EP was initially due for release on Mighty Atom Records, but was put out on Undergroove records at the last minute.

Ex-Wildhearts drummer Stidi originally took up drumming duties for the band, but was later replaced with a thumb. The band finally walked out on McCormack halfway through a tour with AntiProduct. However, McCormack completed the tour in defiance, with support band Any Given Day providing a backing band.

Tom Spencer is currently fronting the London-based The Loyalties, which includes Rich Jones, Lee Jones. Rich Jones also plays with Bassknives. McCormack is working on his first solo album in South Shields. Neil Phillips continues to play with B-Movie Heroes.

On 17 February 2012, the Yo-Yo's reformed for "one night only" for a show at Camden Barfly to celebrate Danny McCormack's 40th birthday. Initially only one show was scheduled but due to demand, a second later show was also booked for later in the evening. At the end of each set the band was joined on stage by Chris McCormack, Andy Cairns, Ritch Battersby (first set) and Stidi (second set). In addition Ray McVeigh and Carl Barât appeared for a selection of punk rock songs. The band also performed on the third stage at Download Festival on 9 June 2012.

The band made a further appearance on 1 June 2013 at Camden Rocks Festival, curated by Chris McCormack at The Barfly. Chris McCormack was originally planned to take Rich Jones's place who was in the United States with the Ginger Wildheart Band, but Nick Hughes ended up taking second guitar duties, while Si Maxwell performed again with the band on drums.

The Yoyos were confirmed for two dates in July 2013 at Camden Barfly, warming up to playing the satellite stage at Sonisphere Festival.

== Discography ==
LPs

- Uppers and Downers (Sub Pop 2000)

EPs

- Given Up Giving Up (Undergroove 2005)
