= Not Fakin' It =

Studio album by Michael Monroe
- Released: September 1989
- Studio: Atlantic Studios, New York City
- Genre: Hard rock; glam metal; glam punk
- Length: 39:07
- Label: PolyGram
- Producer: Michael Monroe, Michael Frondelli

Michael Monroe chronology
Nights Are So Long (1987)	Not Fakin' It (1989)	Peace of Mind (1996)

Singles from Not Fakin' It
- 1. "Dead, Jail or Rock 'n' Roll" / "Shakedown" Released: 1989; 2. "Man with No Eyes" Released: 1989; 3. "She's No Angel" / "Not Fakin' It" Released: 1989; 4. "While You Were Looking at Me" / "Love Is Thicker than Blood" Released: 1990

Professional ratings
Review scores
Source	Rating
AllMusic	3/5 stars
Hi-Fi News & Record Review	A:1*

Not Fakin' It is the second studio album by Hanoi Rocks singer Michael Monroe, released in September 1989 through PolyGram; a remastered edition was reissued through Lemon Recordings in 2003. The album is Monroe's most commercially successful solo release to date, reaching No. 14 on the Finnish albums chart, No. 161 on the U.S. Billboard 200, and being certified gold in Japan. The single "Man with No Eyes" reached No. 90 on the UK singles chart.

The music video for "Dead, Jail or Rock 'n' Roll" featured Guns N' Roses singer Axl Rose and received substantial rotation on MTV; it was later covered by the band Warrant for their 2002 album Under the Influence. The track "Angel" is a re-recording of the song "She's No Angel" which had appeared on Monroe's previous album, Nights Are So Long (1987).

== Musical style ==
The albums consists of "Michael Monroe [adding] hair band rock to his usual mix of punk, glam, and '70s heavy metal". Ultimate Classic Rock placed the album No. 26 on their list of the Top 30 Glam Metal Albums, and described it as a "glam-punk-'n'-roll hybrid".

== Track listing ==
No.	Title	Writer(s)	Length
1.	"Dead, Jail or Rock 'n' Roll"	Michael Monroe, Little Steven, Nasty Suicide	4:31
2.	"While You Were Looking at Me"	Steven	4:03
3.	"She's No Angel" (Heavy Metal Kids cover)	Gary Holton, Monroe, Stiv Bators	3:52
4.	"All Night with the Lights On"	Monroe, Phil Grande, Danny Lewis	3:52
5.	"Not Fakin' It" (Nazareth cover)	Dan McCafferty, Manny Charlton, Pete Agnew, Darrell Sweet	3:52
6.	"Shakedown"	Monroe, Grande	3:13
7.	"Man with No Eyes"	Monroe, Grande	3:58
8.	"Love Is Thicker than Blood"	Monroe, Martin Briley	4:14
9.	"Smoke Screen"	Monroe, Steven, Suicide	4:05
10.	"Thrill Me"	Monroe, Grande	3:27
Total length:			39:07

== Personnel ==
- Michael Monroe – lead vocals, harmonica, shaker, arrangement (tracks 1, 3–10), producer (tracks 1–3, 9)
- Axl Rose – backing vocals (tracks 1, 5)
- Phil Grande – lead and rhythm guitar (all tracks), arrangement (tracks 4, 6, 7, 10)
- Nasty Suicide – guitar (tracks 1–3)
- Jimmy Ripp – guitar (tracks 1–3, 9), slide guitar (track 1)
- Ed Roynesdal – keyboard, piano (tracks 5, 6)
- Ian Hunter – piano (track 3)
- Anton Fig – drums (tracks 1–3, 9)
- Thommy Price – drums (tracks 4–8, 10)
- Sue Hadjopoulos – percussion (tracks 1, 4, 6–10), tambourine (track 2)
- John Regan – bass (tracks 1–3)
- Kenny Aaronson – bass (tracks 4–10)
- Mark Rivera – saxophone
- Little Steven – backing vocals (tracks 1–3, 5), arrangement (tracks 2, 5, 6, 9)
- Suha Gur – background vocals (track 1)
- Dave Hansen – background vocals (track 1)
- Stephen Innocenzi – background vocals (track 1)
- Brian Sperber – background vocals (track 1), engineering assistance
- Holly Beth Vincent – background vocals (track 2)
- Kim Lesley – background vocals (tracks 4, 6, 9, 10)
- Nicole Hart – background vocals (tracks 4, 6, 9, 10)
- Gennaro – background vocals (tracks 4, 6, 9, 10)
- The Monroettes – background vocals (tracks 7, 8)
- Brian James – arrangement (track 3)
- Martin Briley – arrangement (track 8)

Technical

- Michael Frondelli – engineering, mixing, production
- Will Garrett – engineering
- Rod O'Brien – engineering (tracks 1–3, 9)
- Ellen Fitton – engineering assistance
- Billy Miranda – engineering assistance (tracks 1–3, 9)
- George Marino – mastering
- Frankie "Teardrop" Miles – production assistance
- John Scarpati - cover photography

== Charts ==
Chart (1989)	Peak position
Finnish albums chart	14
Japan Oricon Albums Chart	21
US Billboard 200	161
