= Michael Monroe =

Finnish rock musician (born 1962)

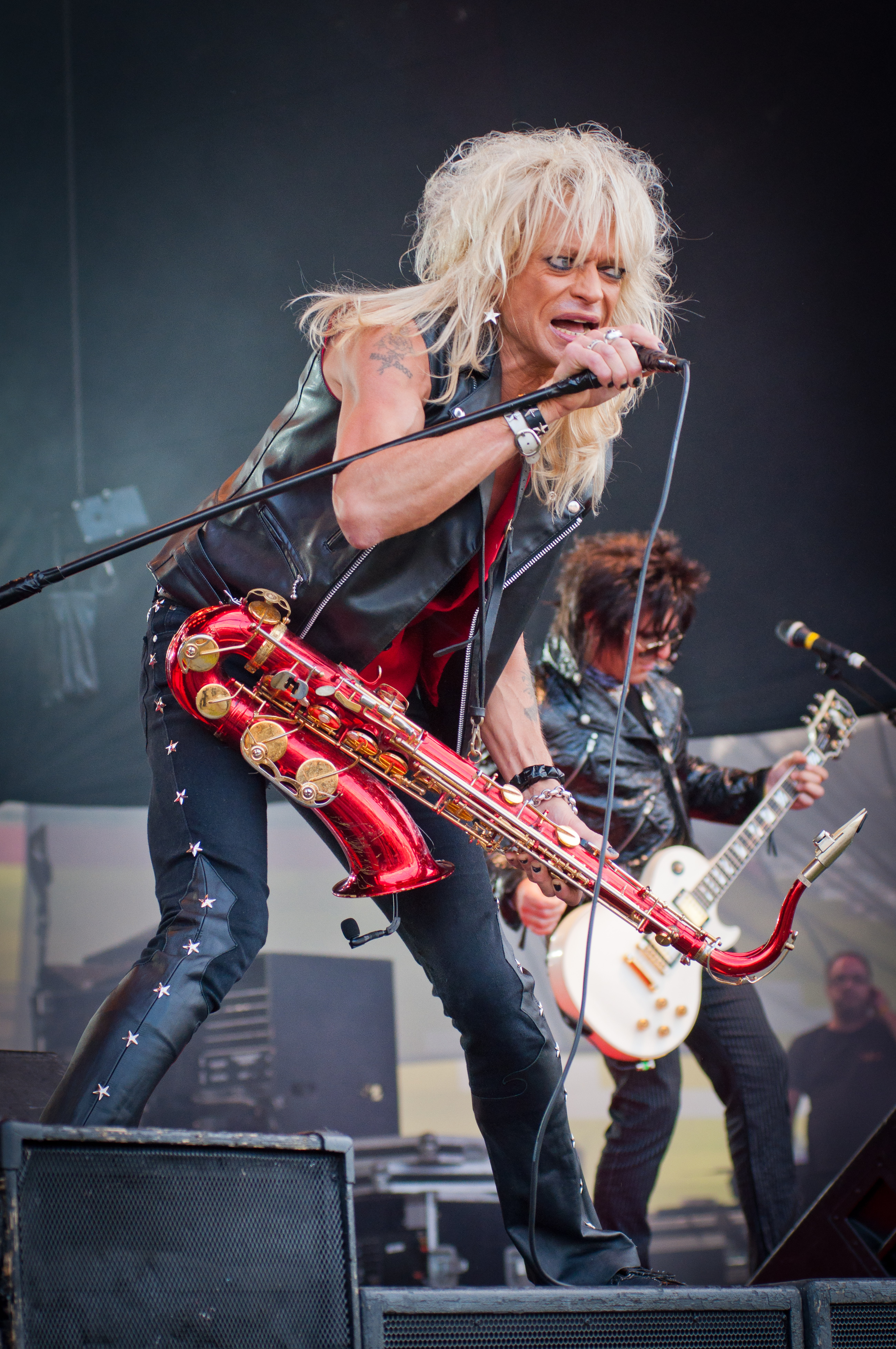
- Monroe at the 2011 Ilosaarirock festival

Background information
- Also known as: Mike Monroe, High in the Sky, Flashing Psychedelic Kid
- Born: Matti Antero Kristian Fagerholm; 17 June 1962 (age 64); Helsinki, Finland
- Genres: Hard rock; glam metal; glam punk; glam rock
- Occupations: Singer; musician; songwriter
- Instruments: Vocals; saxophone; harmonica
- Years active: 1979–present
- Labels: Johanna Kustannus; Lick; Nippon Phonogram; CBS; Major Leiden; Backstage Alliance; Mercury; Yahoo!
- Member of: Michael Monroe Band; Demolition 23
- Formerly of: Hanoi Rocks; Jerusalem Slim
- Website: michaelmonroe.com

Matti "Makke" Antero Kristian Fagerholm (born 17 June 1962), also better known by the stage name Michael Monroe, is a Finnish rock musician best known as the lead vocalist and saxophonist for the glam punk band Hanoi Rocks. He has also fronted several side projects, including Demolition 23. (sic) and Jerusalem Slim (with Steve Stevens).

== Early life ==
Monroe was born Matti "Makke" Fagerholm on 17 June 1962. His father Pentti Fagerholm (1935–2015) was a well-known Finnish radio personality and reporter.

Monroe has said that one of the first times he was exposed to rock and roll was when he saw Black Sabbath's 1970 Paris performance on television. Other favourite bands of his at the time included Alice Cooper, The New York Dolls, Led Zeppelin, Creedence Clearwater Revival, and Little Richard.

From 1976 to 1979 Monroe played in a band called Madness. While rehearsing with Madness in the basement of a church in Töölö, Monroe met guitarist Andy McCoy – then known as Antti Hulkko – whose band Briard was also rehearsing there at the time. Later, Monroe and McCoy briefly played together in a band called Bolin before Monroe went on to play saxophone in Maukka Perusjätkä's band, where he met guitarist Nasty Suicide.

== Career ==
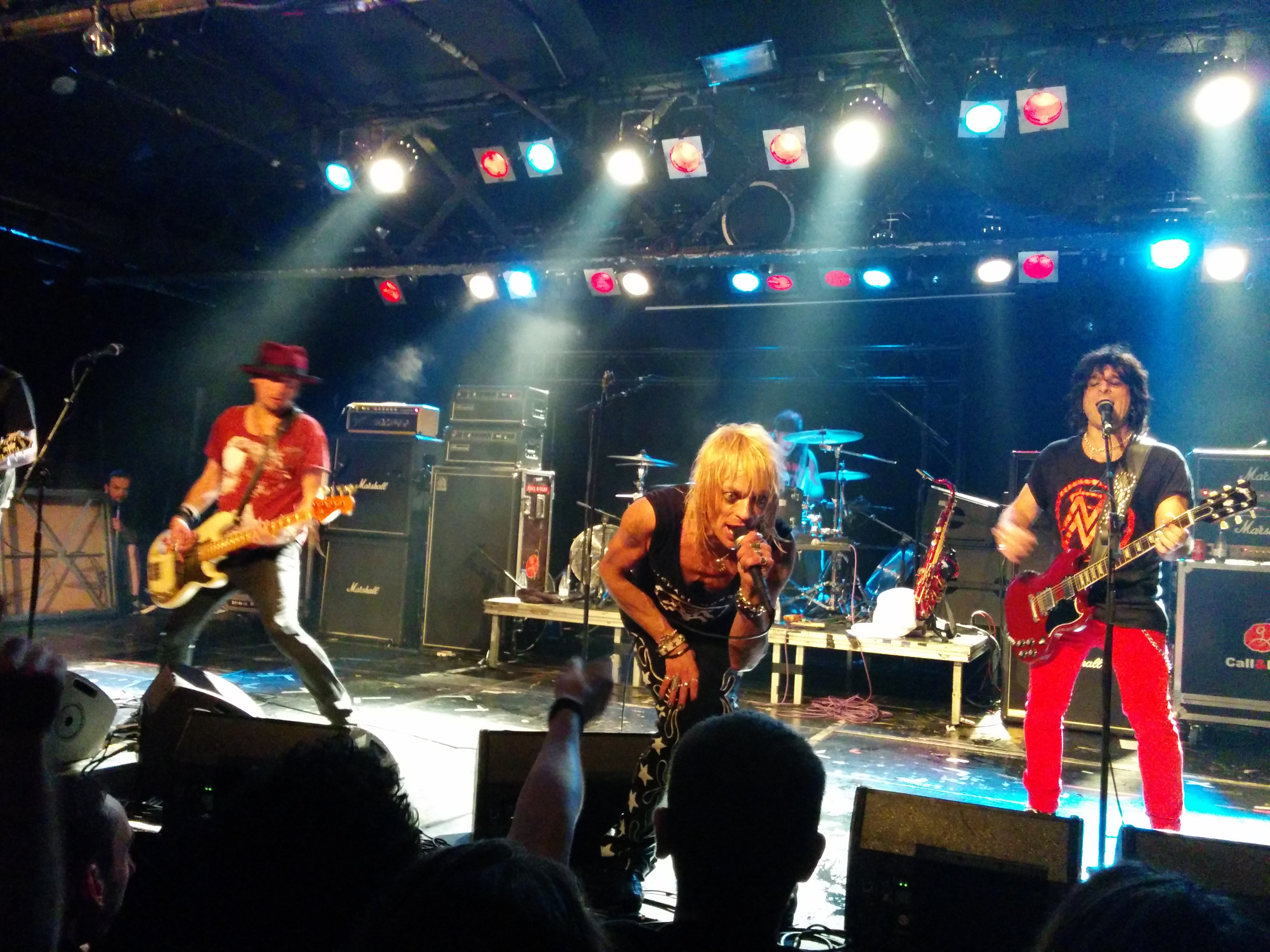
Monroe & band performing at Sala Razzmatazz 2 in May 2014 in Barcelona, Spain

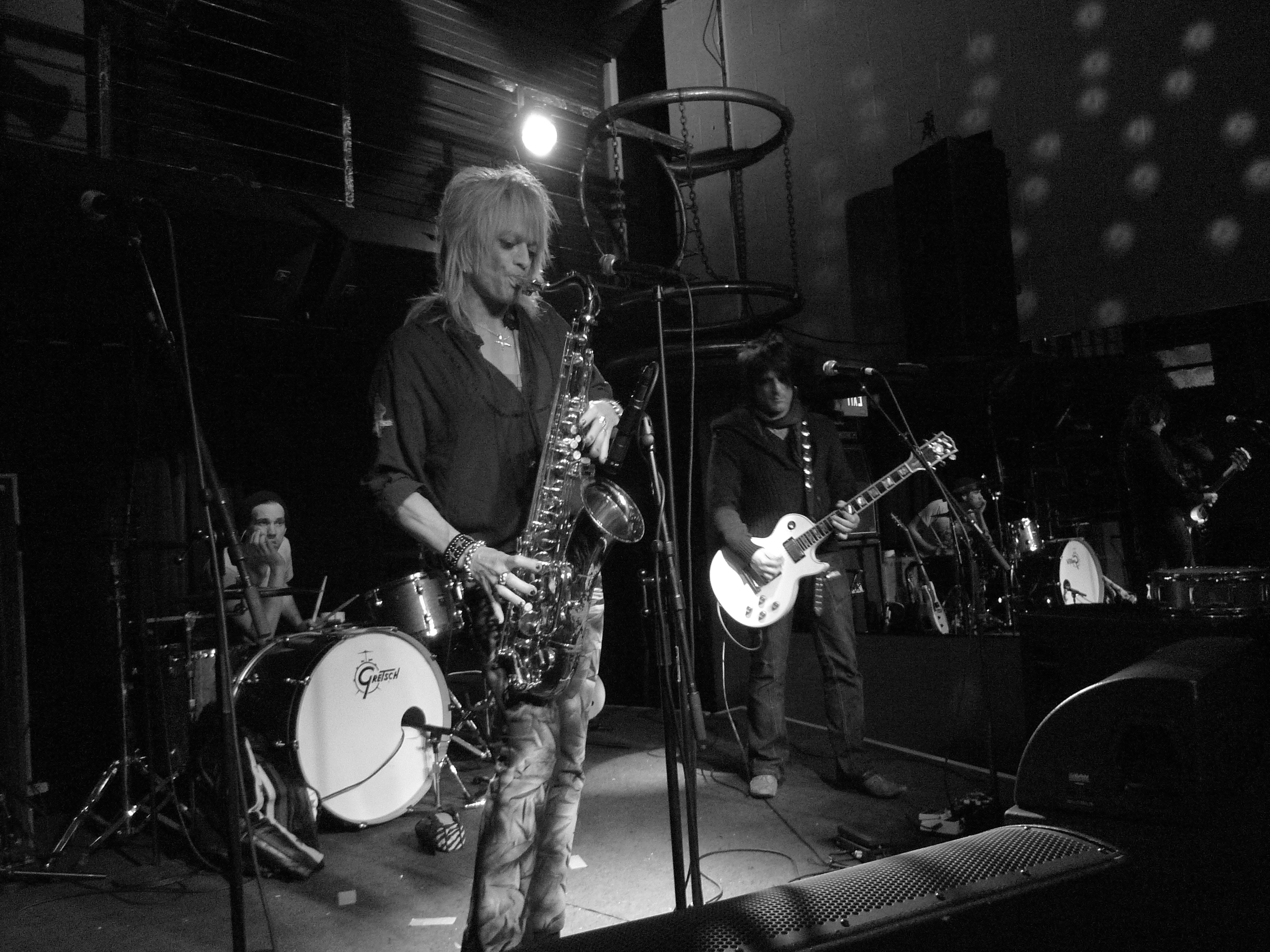
Monroe performing with his band in 2010

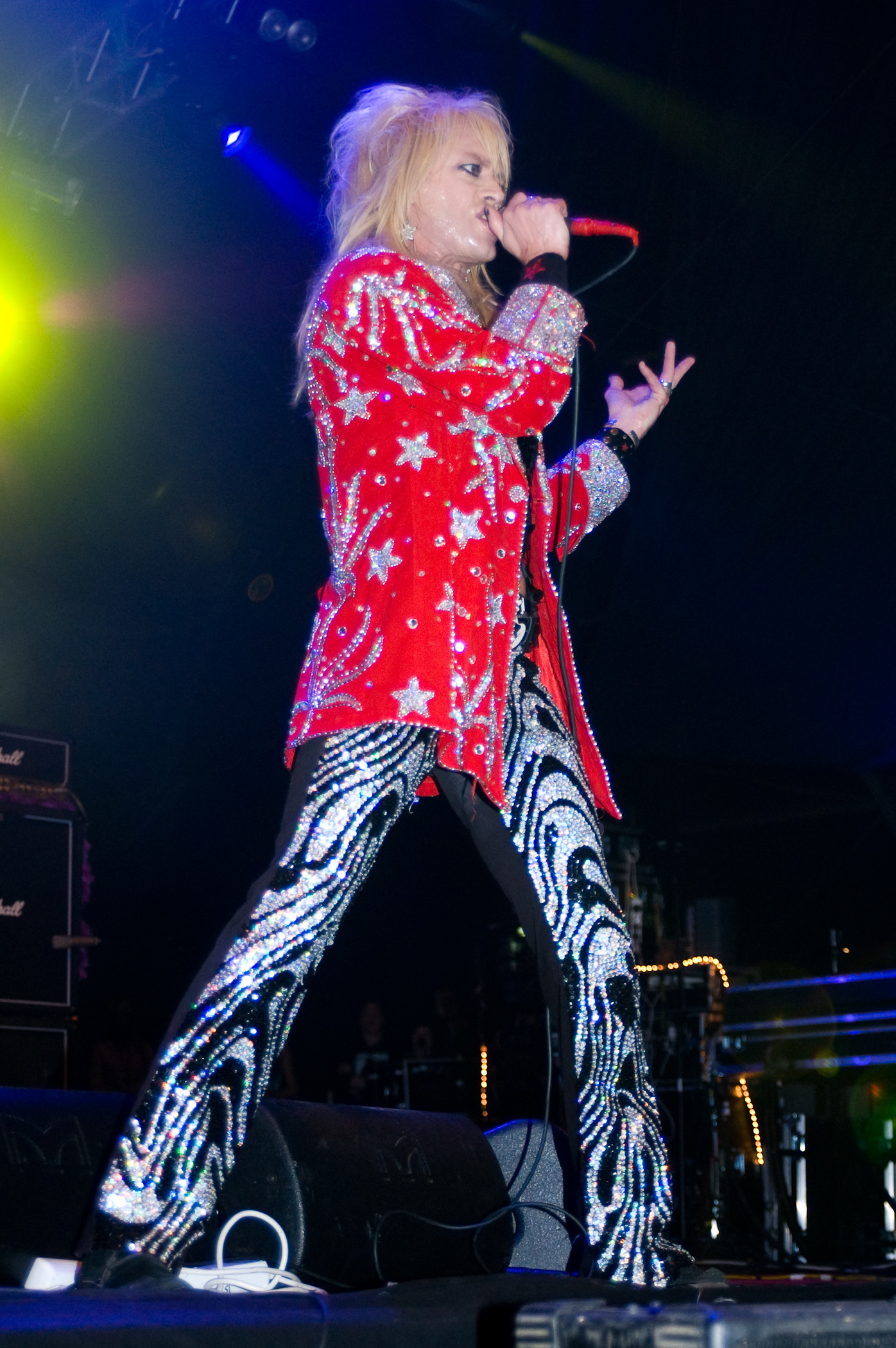
Monroe performing at the Ilosaarirock festival in 2008 in Joensuu, Finland

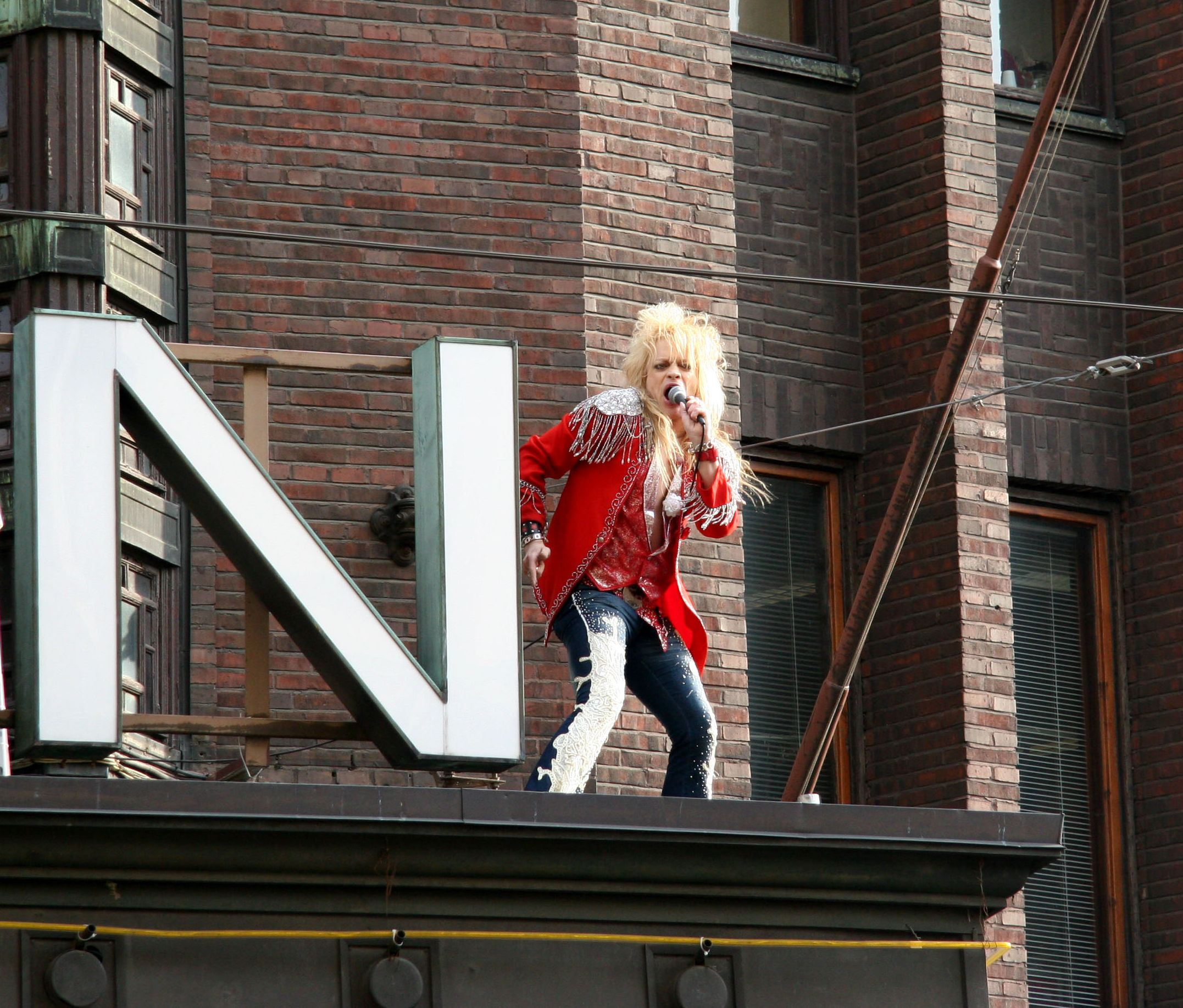
Monroe performing at the Stockmann building, Helsinki 2005

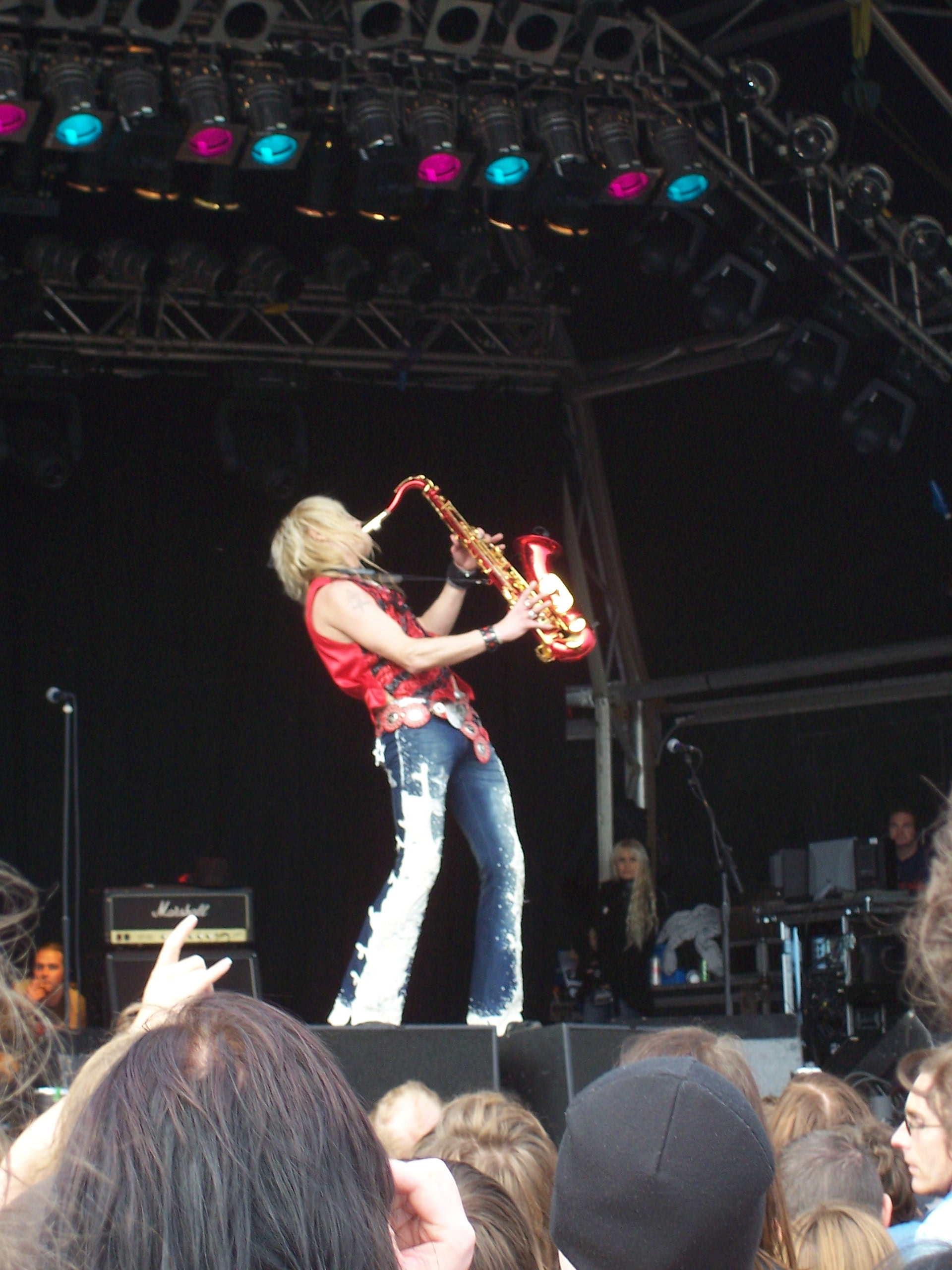
Monroe playing the saxophone on stage at the Scarborough Rock in the Castle festival

=== Hanoi Rocks (1979–1985) ===
Monroe and his guitarist friend Andy McCoy came up with the idea for the band Hanoi Rocks, but since McCoy was already playing in the Finnish punk band Pelle Miljoona Oy he told Monroe to start the band without him. At one stage, Monroe had auditioned to be the bassist for Pelle Miljoona Oy, and while the audition had gone well the band ultimately chose bassist Sami Yaffa. But when Andy McCoy left Pelle Miljoona Oy and joined Hanoi Rocks in 1980 he brought Yaffa with him. The band later recruited drummer Gyp Casino and Nasty Suicide, the latter staying in the band until 1985.

In 1981 Hanoi Rocks released their first album titled Bangkok Shocks, Saigon Shakes, Hanoi Rocks, with most of the songs written by McCoy. The album was produced by McCoy and Monroe, who were known as "The Muddy Twins."

In 1982 Hanoi Rocks moved to London and released their second studio album, Oriental Beat. The band later deemed the release a failure, stating that the album was mixed badly by the producer Pete Woolcroft. The band later fired drummer Gyp Casino and hired Nicholas Dingley, better known as Razzle. Later that year the band released Self Destruction Blues, and although it had Razzle on the cover he didn't play on the album since it was actually a compilation of old singles. The tour for the album took the band to Asia for the first time.

In 1983 the band released Back to Mystery City.

In 1984 the band began working with producer Bob Ezrin on their fifth studio album Two Steps from the Move, which was the first recording deal that would introduce them into US markets. The original title of the album was Silver Missiles and Nightingales, but this was changed before release.

Also in 1984, readers of Sounds magazine voted Hanoi Rocks as the second best band in the world after Marillion. The Hanoi Rocks album Two Steps from the Move and single "Underwater World" were voted album of the year and fifth best single of the year. A televised concert recorded in England was voted as the second best concert video, and the group was voted number three as stage performers. Michael Monroe was voted "The Sex Symbol of the Year".

While on their first large tour in the US Monroe fractured his ankle. Some dates had to be pushed back and the band traveled to Los Angeles to prepare for their two upcoming sold-out gigs. Though Monroe decided to stay in his hotel room and rest, some of the band members attended a party at the house of Mötley Crüe singer Vince Neil. At some point Razzle and Neil left the party and were involved a car crash that resulted in Razzle's death.

After Razzle's death the band performed in Helsinki, Finland at a concert televised throughout Europe as part of the Europa Go Go project. The show had over 500 million viewers across Europe and was Hanoi Rocks' first public concert with their new drummer Terry Chimes. It was also their last performance with Sami Yaffa, who left the band due to personal differences with McCoy. The band tried to record demos with new members Rene Berg and Terry Chimes, but according to Michael Monroe things "didn't feel the same any more," and the band disbanded after a short tour of Poland. One of the shows in Poland was recorded and later became the Rock and Roll Divorce album, released after the band had already split up.

=== Solo years and other bands (1985–2001) ===
After Hanoi Rocks broke up in 1985 Monroe decided to start his solo career. But first he got to work with his good friend Stiv Bators, for in the fall of 1985 Bators and Monroe were asked by Steven Van Zandt to record backing vocals in London for his song "Sun City", and then fly to New York to appear in the music video. Both agreed.

In December 1985 Monroe announced that he would move to New York, and in 1986 he founded his first solo band.

In 1987 he released his first solo album, Nights Are So Long. The album was a moderate hit, but it attracted big record labels, and in 1988 Monroe signed to Mercury Records.

In 1989, Monroe's second solo album was released, titled Not Fakin' It. The album featured guest appearances by Monroe's friends and fellow musicians, including Steven Van Zandt, Ian Hunter and Nasty Suicide. The album reached number 161 on the US Billboard Chart and was Monroe's first album to be distributed internationally. The album also got good reviews from critics. Music videos were shot for the singles "Dead, Jail or Rock 'N' Roll" and "Man With No Eyes". Axl Rose appeared in the music video for "Dead, Jail or Rock 'N' Roll", and the video was also screened at MTV's Headbangers Ball, which Monroe hosted.

At the time Not Fakin' It was released, Guns N' Roses' record label UZI Suicide was re-releasing Hanoi Rocks' albums in America. Guns N' Roses guitarist Slash also made a guest appearance at Monroe's Los Angeles shows in December 1989, performing the song "Looking at You". Aerosmith's lead singer Steven Tyler had also taken notice of Monroe and asked him to perform with Aerosmith at Les Paul's 75th birthday at the Hard Rock Cafe in New York, where Monroe played saxophone on the song "Big Ten Inch Record."

Monroe mostly spent the rest of 1989 and 1990 touring, but at the turn of the decade he performed along with Bryan Adams, Don Henley, Huey Lewis, and Loudness in two New Year's shows at the 70,000-seat Tokyo Dome in Japan, held on 31 December 1989 and 1 January 1990.

Monroe's solo career did not prove to be as successful as he had hoped, so in 1990 he decided to put together a new band called Jerusalem Slim, featuring former Billy Idol-guitarist Steve Stevens, Sami Yaffa, Greg Ellis, and Ian McLagan. The next year he appeared on Guns N' Roses' Use Your Illusion I album, where he played harmonica and saxophone on the song "Bad Obsession." Monroe also later appeared on Guns N' Roses' 1993 album "The Spaghetti Incident?", where he sang on the cover of The Dead Boys' "Ain't It Fun". He also joined Guns N' Roses on stage performing Honky Tonk Women with the band and Ronnie Wood of the Rolling Stones.

Jerusalem Slim released an album titled Jerusalem Slim but broke up in 1992 due to Monroe's and Stevens' musical disagreements. Following that, Monroe formed another band called Demolition 23. with Yaffa, Jimmy Clark, and ex-Star Star guitarist Jay Hening, who was eventually replaced by Nasty Suicide. Demolition 23. released a self-titled album in 1994 and toured successfully in Japan and Europe, but the band broke up after Suicide announced that he would be retiring from the music business.

During the rest of the 1990s and the early 2000s Monroe released four more solo albums.

=== Reformation of Hanoi Rocks (2002–2009) ===
In 2002 Monroe and McCoy decided to reform Hanoi Rocks with Monroe's solo career drummer Lacu and two new members on guitar and bass. The resulting band released Twelve Shots on the Rocks in 2003. In 2005 Hanoi Rocks released Another Hostile Takeover, this time with Andy Christell on bass and Conny Bloom on guitar (both formerly of the Electric Boys). In 2007 the band released the album Street Poetry. In 2008 McCoy and Monroe announced that they had taken the band as far as they could and that they had decided to end the band. In April 2009 Hanoi Rocks played eight sold-out farewell gigs in six days at the Tavastia Club, Helsinki, with the band's original guitarist Nasty Suicide appearing as a special guest at three of the last gigs.

Later in 2009, Monroe, Ari Väntänen, and Andy McCoy published the book All Those Wasted Years in Finnish, telling the story of Hanoi Rocks from the beginning to the end.

In June 2009 Monroe performed in Helsinki and Tampere at the Sauna Open Air festival with Duff McKagans Loaded band. On 3 July 2009 Monroe performed at the Ruisrock festival in Finland with Ginger's band, The Wildhearts, and at the end of July Monroe shared the stage with Sami Yaffa for the first time in many years when his band, the New York Dolls, were performing in Helsinki. After these performances with Yaffa and Ginger, Monroe and Yaffa started discussing the possibility of working together again.

In December 2009 Monroe met Ginger again while he was playing in Alice Cooper's band. Monroe joined Alice Cooper on stage to play "School's Out" at Cooper's concert in Espoo, Finland, and after the show Ginger and Monroe discussed the possibilities of working together.

=== Michael Monroe Band (2010–present) ===
On 25 January 2010, Monroe held a press conference in Los Angeles where he unveiled his new band featuring Sami Yaffa on bass, guitarist Ginger from The Wildhearts, Todd Youth from Danzig, Samhain on second guitar, and Jimmy Clarke on drums. The Michael Monroe Band started a US tour on 11 March at San Francisco's Paradise Lounge and continued touring until 21 March. After some of the first shows, Todd Youth and Jimmy Clark were replaced by guitarist Steve Conte of New York Dolls and drummer Karl Rosqvist.

During the summer of 2010 the Michael Monroe band played a number of festival gigs all over the world, including Helsinki Live in Finland (headlined by Guns N' Roses), the Sweden Rock Festival, and the Download Festival in England. The band also performed at Ruisrock festival in Turku, Finland, where Monroe joined Slash on stage for a performance of "We're All Gonna Die" (from Slash's solo album) and "Up Around the Bend." At the Ankkarock festival in Finland, Steve Conte couldn't perform and was replaced in the Michael Monroe Band for this one show by ex-Hanoi Rocks guitarist Nasty Suicide. This was the first time that these three original members of Hanoi Rocks had performed on stage together since the Demolition 23. tour in the early 1990s. Monroe performed at the Summer Sonic festivals in Tokyo and Osaka where Slash was also performing, and the two shared the stage for a couple of songs. During the performance of the song "We're All Gonna Die," Monroe broke two of his ribs when he hit a metal barrel in front of the stage.

On 28 June 2010 it was announced that the Michael Monroe Band would be supporting Motörhead on their 35th anniversary UK tour, and their first album, the live album Another Night in the Sun, was released in September 2010. The album was recorded at the Tavastia Club in Helsinki, Finland, and mixed in Los Angeles by Niko Bolas (Keith Richards, Kiss, Spinal Tap), with the album mastered by Grammy winner Richard Dodd, who had worked with Tom Petty and The Dixie Chicks.

In September 2010 the Michael Monroe Band started recording their first studio album, Sensory Overdrive, recorded in Los Angeles and produced by Jack Douglas (Aerosmith, John Lennon). The first single, "78", was released in January 2011 and the album was released on 14 March 2011. The band also booked an extensive UK tour for April 2010 at venues in London, Brighton, Birmingham, Leeds, Exeter, and others. Also in September 2010, Monroe signed a recording deal with Spinefarm Records / Universal Music to distribute Monroe's upcoming albums.

On 9 November 2011 Sensory Overdrive won album of the year at the 2011 Classic Rock magazine awards.

In the fall of 2012 Michael Monroe announced that the band would be back in the studio recording a new album to be released in 2013. By July, Steven Van Zandt was playing the lead single "Ballad of the Lower East Side" on his radio show almost weekly. On 23 August 2013 the band released Horns & Halos, which went straight to number one on the Finnish album charts and was certified gold in four days in Finland.

On 6 March 2014 it was announced that guitarist Dregen was leaving the band to focus on his solo career, to be replaced by former Black Halos, Amen and Ginger Wildheart guitarist Rich Jones.

== Personal life ==
During the 1980s Monroe lived in Stockholm, spending six months on the streets. He met his first wife Jude Wilder in 1985 while she was working at CBS for Hanoi Rocks' Two Steps From The Move project. After they married in 1989 the couple moved to Los Angeles and then to New York, where Monroe lived for ten years. After many years spent living in the United States, the couple relocated to Turku, Finland. Wilder died of an intracranial haemorrhage on 19 June 2001. Monroe married his second wife, Johanna, on 3 July 2003.

Unlike other 1980s members of Hanoi Rocks, Monroe was never a big drug user or a big drinker, although in the band's book All Those Wasted Years he tells about being addicted for a short while to amphetamines and heroin in the 1980s while living in London, and to amphetamines between 2000 and 2002 after his first wife died.

During his years in the music business Monroe established close friendships with many musicians including Stiv Bators and Johnny Thunders (both idols of Monroe's), Steven Van Zandt, who produced Monroe's self-titled album with Demolition 23, Deborah Harry, Axl Rose, Slash, Duff McKagan and Alice Cooper.

== Legacy ==
Michael Monroe and Hanoi Rocks have influenced many rock artists and bands, including Guns N' Roses. The band's lead vocalist Axl Rose publicly cited Hanoi Rocks as an influence, and lead guitarist Slash was a fan of the band before he became a professional musician himself, attending the sold-out gigs in Los Angeles which were cancelled because of the death of Razzle. Vince Neil and Nikki Sixx of Mötley Crüe have acknowledged Hanoi Rocks as an influence on their music, and Foo Fighters guitarist Chris Shiflett commented that "The Hollywood scene changed in just one night after people saw the pictures of Hanoi Rocks. After that everyone was wearing the same kind of hair, clothes and make up as Monroe".

Monroe and Hanoi Rocks have been seen as crucial influences on the music and fashion of the Los Angeles' glam metal scene, developed into a mainstream commercial force by many groups throughout the 1980s, including Mötley Crüe, Jetboy, L.A. Guns and Poison.

== Discography ==
Solo albums

- Nights Are So Long (1987)
- Not Fakin' It (1989)
- Peace of Mind (1996)
- Life Gets You Dirty (1999)
- Take Them and Break Them (2002)
- Whatcha Want (2003)
- Another Night in the Sun: Live in Helsinki (live album) (2010)
- Sensory Overdrive (2011)
- Horns and Halos (2013)
- Blackout States (2015)
- One Man Gang (2019)
- I Live Too Fast to Die Young! (2022)
- Outerstellar (2026)

Singles

- "Keep It Up" (1987)
- "Nights Are So Long" (1987)
- "She's No Angel" (1987)
- "Dead, Jail or Rock 'N' Roll (1989)
- "She's No Angel" (1989)
- "Not Fakin' It" (1989)
- "Man with No Eyes" (1989)
- "While You Were Looking At Me" (1990)
- "Magic Carpet Ride" (Featuring Slash, 1990)
- "Make It Go Away" (1996)
- "Stranded" (2003)
- "Superpowered Superfly" (2010)
- "'78" (2011)
- "Trick of the Wrist" (2011)
- "Ballad of the Lower East Side" (2013)
- "Eighteen Angels" (2013)
- "Stained Glass Heart" (2013)
- "Old King's Road" (2015)
- "Goin' Down with The Ship" (2015)
- "One Foot Outta The Grave" (2017)
- "One Man Gang" (2019)
- "Last Train to Tokyo" (2019)
- "Murder the Summer Of Love" (2022)
- "Can't Stop Falling Apart" (2022)
- "Everybody's Nobody" (2022)
- "Rockin' Horse" (2025)

Hanoi Rocks albums

- Bangkok Shocks, Saigon Shakes, Hanoi Rocks (1981)
- Oriental Beat (1982)
- Self Destruction Blues (1982)
- Back to Mystery City (1983)
- All Those Wasted Years (Live) (1983)
- Two Steps from the Move (1984)
- Rock & Roll Divorce (Live) (1985)
- Twelve Shots on the Rocks (2002)
- Another Hostile Takeover (2005)
- Street Poetry (2007)

Jerusalem Slim albums

- Jerusalem Slim (1992)

Demolition 23. albums

- Demolition 23. (1994)

Fallen Angels

- Fallen Angels 1984

Guest appearances

- London Cowboys: Street Full of Soul (1983)
- Hook, Line and Sinker: Hook, Line and Sinker and Saigon (1983)
- Tall in the Saddle (1984)
- It Takes Time (1985)
- Artists United Against Apartheid: Sun City (1985)
- Que Sera Sera – Johnny Thunders album (1985)
- Long Time Coming (1986)
- Dance Crazy (1987)
- Guns N' Roses: Use Your Illusion I (1991)
- WOW! WOW! OUI! OUI! (1992)
- Chinese Rocks – Ultimate Thunders Live Collection (1993)
- Guns N' Roses: "The Spaghetti Incident?" (1993)
- Various artists: Coneheads: Music From The Motion Picture Soundtrack (1993)
- Warrior Soul: Chill Pill (1993)
- Johnny on Rocks featuring the whole Hanoi Rocks (1996)
- Dogtown Balladeers: A Tale Worth Hearing (1996)
- Countdown Love (1997)
- Backyard Babies: Total 13 (1998) on the bonus track 'Rocker'
- Kerma: Kerma plays Rolling Stones (1998)
- The 4 Faces: Best of Both Worlds b/w Poison Heart (single) (2002)
- I Only Wrote This Song for You – A Tribute to Johnny Thunders (2003)
- White Flame: Swimsuit Issue Centerfold (single) (2007)
- Mikko Herranen: Kylmä Maailma (album) (2012)
- Tarja Turunen: "Your Heaven and Your Hell" (2016)
- Lordi: Killection (2020) on the track "Like a Bee to the Honey"
- Rock-Criminals: "Get Yourself Together" (2023)

== Live band ==
Current members

- Michael Monroe – lead vocals, saxophone, harmonica, guitars, tambourine (1985–present)
- Steve Conte – guitars, backing vocals (2010–present)
- Sami Yaffa – bass, backing vocals (2010–present; special guest 1989)
- Karl Rockfist – drums (2010–present)
- Rich Jones – guitars, backing vocals (2014–present)

Current touring members

- Lenni-Kalle Taipale – keyboards (2021–present)

Former members

- Ginger – guitars, backing vocals (2010–2011)
- Dregen – guitars, backing vocals (2011–2014)
- Jari Paulamäki – bass, backing vocals (1998–2000)
- Pete Lehtelä – drums, backing vocals (1998–2000)
- Jude Wilder – guitars, backing vocals (1998–2000)

Special guest appearances

- Axl Rose – lead and backing vocals (1989)
- Nasty Suicide – guitars, backing vocals (2010, 2011, 2017, 2019, 2022)
- Slash – guitars, backing vocals (1989, 2010, 2015)
- Lemmy – bass, lead and backing vocals (2011)
- Sebastian Bach – lead and backing vocals (2011)

After Hanoi Rocks' breakup in 1985 and saddened by Razzle's death, Lemmy offered up Motörhead to Monroe as his backing band. However, this lineup never came to fruition.

== Tours ==
Headlining

- Not Fakin' It (1989–1990)
- Another Night in the Sun (2010)
- Pikkujoulupiknik (2011)
- Horns and Halos (2013–2014)
- Spring Tour 2014 (2014)
- Blackout States (2015–2016)
- The 30th Anniversary Tour (2017)
- One Man Gang (2019)
- Spring Tour April 2023 (2023)
- Murder The Summer of 2023 (2023)
- Japan 2024 (2024)
- (An Evening of De-Electrified Songs and Stories with) Michael Monroe and Rich Jones (2024)
- Spring Tour 2024 (2024)
- Two Steps From The Move (2024)
- USA April 2025 (2025)
- UK Tour May 2025 (2025)

Supporting

- Alice Cooper – Detroit Muscle (2022)
- Guns N' Roses – We're F'N' Back! Tour

With Hanoi Rocks

- Bangkok Shocks, Saigon Shakes (1981)
- Oriental Beat (1982)
- Self Destruction Blues (1982)
- Back to Mystery City (1983)
- Two Steps from the Move (1984)

Cancelled US tour

- Twelve Shots on the Rocks (2002)
- Another Hostile Takeover (2005)
- Street Poetry (2007)

With Demolition 23.

- Demolition 23. (1993–1994)
- Fall 2023 (2023)
