= Demolition 23 =

US rock band

Demolition 23.
- Origin: New York City, U.S. / Finland
- Genre: Punk • glam punk
- Years active: 1993–1995 • 2022–present
- Labels: Music for Nations, Renegade Nation, Wicked Cool Records
- Spinoff of: Hanoi Rocks
- Members: Michael Monroe; Sami Yaffa; Nasty Suicide; Karl Rockfist
- Past members: Jay Hening; Jimmy Clark

Demolition 23 (stylized Demolition 23.) is a rock band formed in 1993 in New York by former Hanoi Rocks frontman Michael Monroe and former Hanoi Rocks bassist Sami Yaffa following the ending of Monroe's Jerusalem Slim project with Steve Stevens and Sami Yaffa.

== History ==
After the breakup of Jerusalem Slim in 1992, Monroe decided to form a new band with Yaffa, Jimmy Clark and ex Star Star guitarist Jay Hening.

Initially, Demolition 23. was a cover band, playing live shows in New York. Their shows were notable for guest appearances by music industry friends, such as Ian Hunter, Joey Ramone, Sebastian Bach, and Kory Clarke. They also went on tour in Japan and Europe.

Demolition 23.'s eponymous first album, Demolition 23., was recorded at Power Station Studios in New York City and produced and largely penned by Little Steven. Monroe's former Hanoi Rocks bandmate Sami Yaffa played bass guitar on the album. The music was a return to Monroe and Yaffa's punk roots with tracks such as "Same Shit Different Day", "Hammersmith Palais" and covers of songs by Johnny Thunders, UK Subs and The Dead Boys. The album was dedicated to the memory of Stiv Bators and released on the Music for Nations label in 1994.

Hening announced his departure in 1994 and was replaced by former Hanoi rhythm guitarist Nasty Suicide. In March 1995, Suicide announced his departure from the band much to the surprise of Monroe, who then decided to end the band.

On October 14, 2022, the album was reissued on Steven Van Zandt's Wicked Cool Records. Apart from the original listing it included three bonus tracks: demos of "Hammersmith Palais", "Dysfunctional", and "The Scum Lives On".

The band reunited at the Helsinki Ice Hall with the final lineup, with the exception of Clark, who was replaced by Danzig drummer Karl Rockfist. They went on to a small tour of Finland and have remained active, planning to tour Japan, Europe and America.

== Band members ==
=== Current ===
- Michael Monroe – lead vocals, saxophone, harmonica, additional acoustic guitar (1993–1995, 2023–present)
- Nasty Suicide – lead guitar, backing vocals (1994–1995, 2023–present)
- Sami Yaffa – bass guitar, backing vocals (1993–1995, 2023–present)
- Karl Rockfist – drums (2023–present)

=== Former ===
- Jay Hening – lead guitar, backing vocals (1993–1994) (died 1997)
- Jimmy Clark – drums (1993–1995)

== Discography ==
=== Albums ===
- Demolition 23. (1994) – Music for Nations CDMFN 176
