= Steve Conte =

American rock musician

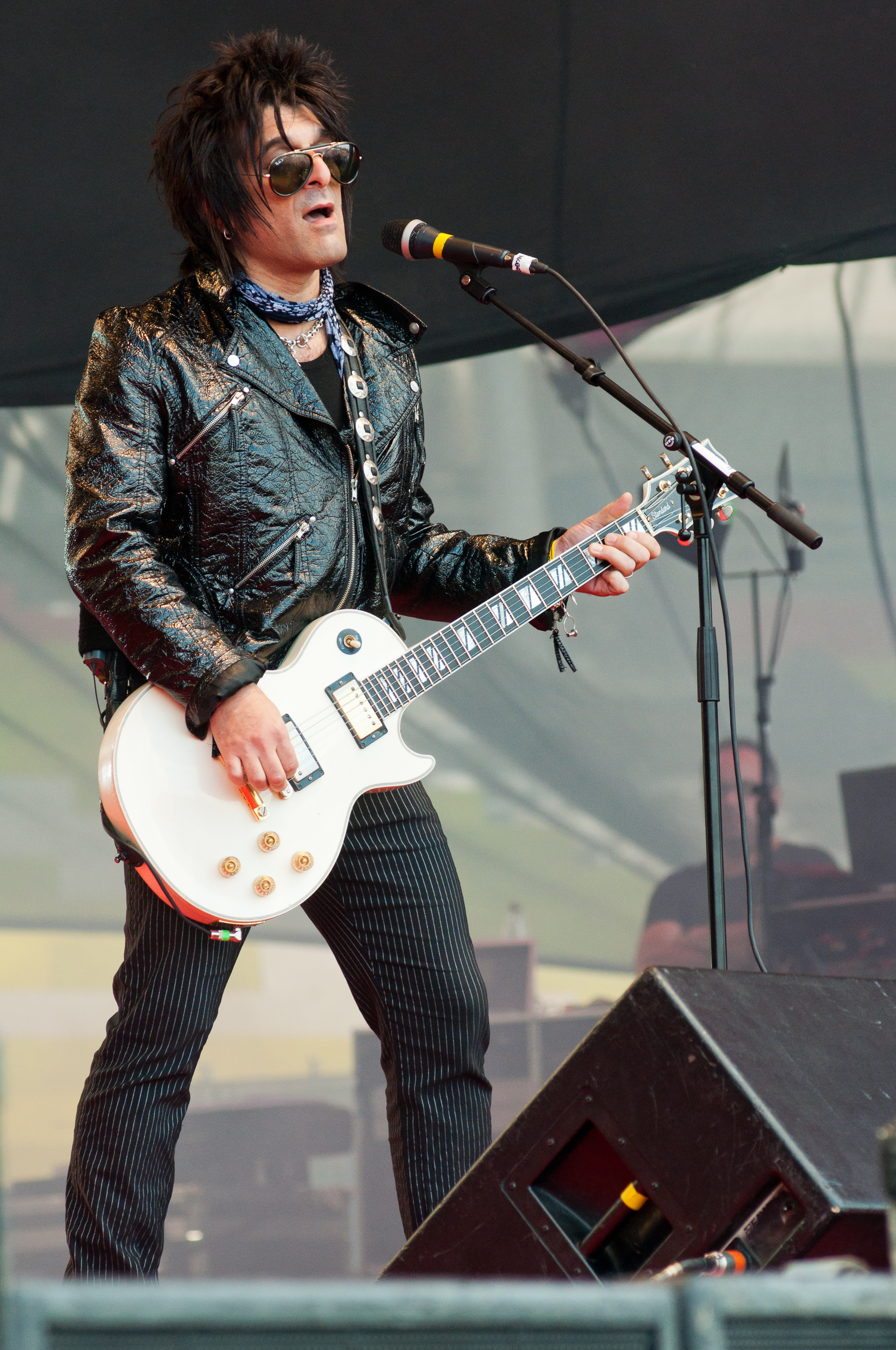
- Conte performing at the 2011 Ilosaarirock festival with Michael Monroe band

Background information
- Born: September 23, 1960 (age 66); New York City, U.S.
- Genres: Rock, hard rock
- Occupations: Musician, songwriter, producer
- Instruments: Guitar, vocals
- Website: stevecontemusic.com

Steve Conte is an American guitarist, singer and songwriter, and the frontman of the band Steve Conte NYC. He has worked with Japanese composer Yoko Kanno on a variety of anime soundtracks including Wolf's Rain, Cowboy Bebop, RahXephon and Ghost in the Shell: Stand Alone Complex 2nd GIG. He is a former lead guitarist of the New York Dolls.

== Early life ==
Conte was born to an Italian American family in 1960. His father is of Lucanian descent and his mother of Calabrian descent. Growing up in a musical family (mother Rosemary Conte is a New Jersey jazz singer), Conte followed his passion for music early at seven years old when he began playing drums. At ten years old, he picked up his brother John Conte's guitar and started making up songs. One year later, the Conte brothers recorded their first "album" in the family living room with Steve singing, playing guitar and drums, writing the songs, and "producing". He also played backup with his mother in many Jersey Shore venues. To pursue his musical talents further, he earned a full scholarship to attend Rutgers University and graduated with a Bachelor of Arts degree in music with a focus on jazz guitar performance. At Rutgers, his classmates included fellow musicians Terrence Blanchard, Ralph Peterson Jr., and Frank Lacy and studied under the tutelage of Ted Dunbar, Kenny Barron, Paul Jeffrey, and Larry Ridley. Upon graduation, he moved to New York City and took his first road gig with the jazz-rock group Blood, Sweat & Tears.

== Career ==
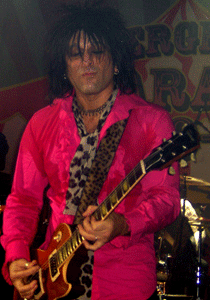
Conte at a New York Dolls concert in November 2006

During his early years in New York (1986–1987), Conte landed a variety of gigs; he was a guitarist and musical director for Prince and the Revolution singer Jill Jones, session and live guitarist with James Brown producers Dan Hartman and Charlie Midnight (Conte's first record date was the Hartman-produced Joy album by Paul King), as well as a stint with New Jersey rocker Glen Burtnick and jazz fusion band Bushrock, led by keyboard virtuoso Delmar Brown.

In 1988, along with blues harp master Rob Paparozzi, Conte and his brother, John, founded the blues band the Hudson River Rats, whose residency at the Acme Bar & Grill in the West Village, New York City, afforded them the chance to meet and play with many blues greats and pop stars. The brothers performed with Etta James, Charlie Musselwhite, James Cotton, Johnny Adams, Reese Wynans (Stevie Ray Vaughan), Phoebe Snow, Cyndi Lauper, John Waite, Richie Hayward (Little Feat), Will Lee, Lou Marini (the Blues Brothers), Carole King, the Uptown Horns, Steve Clark (Def Leppard), and others. Funk and soul drummer Bernard "Pretty" Purdie eventually joined the band after jamming with them many times. This was Conte's entrance into the New York City studio musician scene, where he still works today. Besides numerous playing and singing on film, television soundtracks, commercials and video game music, he's been recorded on albums with many of his childhood heroes: The J. Geils Band frontman Peter Wolf (Fool's Parade, 1998) and James Brown saxophone player Maceo Parker (Funk Overload, 1998), as well as the single "Fear of the Unknown" with Suzi Quatro.

Conte first became known to the music industry in the early 1990s as the songwriter and guitarist of the band Company of Wolves (Mercury Records). After the Wolves' breakup in 1992, he went on to form the band Crown Jewels with John Conte, and in 2003, the pair made an album under the name the Contes. In 2004, Steve Conte joined the New York Dolls as a guitarist and vocalist, where he would remain until 2010, when he joined Michael Monroe's new band.

Conte also worked with composer Yoko Kanno and lyricist Tim Jensen on soundtracks to various popular anime series. Those works include the opening theme to Wolf's Rain, titled "Stray", as well as the tracks "Heaven's Not Enough" and "Could You Bite the Hand?" All three appear on the OST albums. As a guest vocalist for the Kanno-led Seatbelts, Conte also sang vocals in episodes of Cowboy Bebop, as well as the 2001 film, most notably the song "Call Me Call Me", as well as "Words That We Couldn't Say", "No Reply" and "Diggin'". He also sang "Rain" on the OST CD, which is sung by Mai Yamane and featured in the series. He would later sing alongside Shanti Snyder on "Living Inside the Shell", the ending theme to 2004's Ghost in the Shell: Stand Alone Complex 2nd GIG. Conte also performed on the duet "The Garden of Everything" with Japanese singer Maaya Sakamoto on her RahXephon-related single "Tune the Rainbow". In 2007, he provided the vocals for the video game Sonic and the Secret Rings. He sings the closing credits song titled "Worth a Chance", as well as the game's main theme "Seven Rings in Hand".

Conte formed the band Steve Conte & The Crazy Truth and produced a debut album on October 20, 2009, which was released through Varèse Sarabande Records. In 2010, Conte joined Michael Monroe's new band, The Michael Monroe Band, where he is a guitarist, along with fellow New York Doll and bassist Sami Yaffa.

In September 2014, Conte provided solo acoustic guitar accompaniment for Angelina Jordan, winner of Norway's Got Talent (Norske Talenter), on the American television program The View.

In November 2022, Conte announced a new solo album that he is writing with XTC's Andy Partridge, whom he called "one of the greatest songwriters in the world". The two worked on a total of 8 new songs via Zoom sessions.

== Selected discography ==
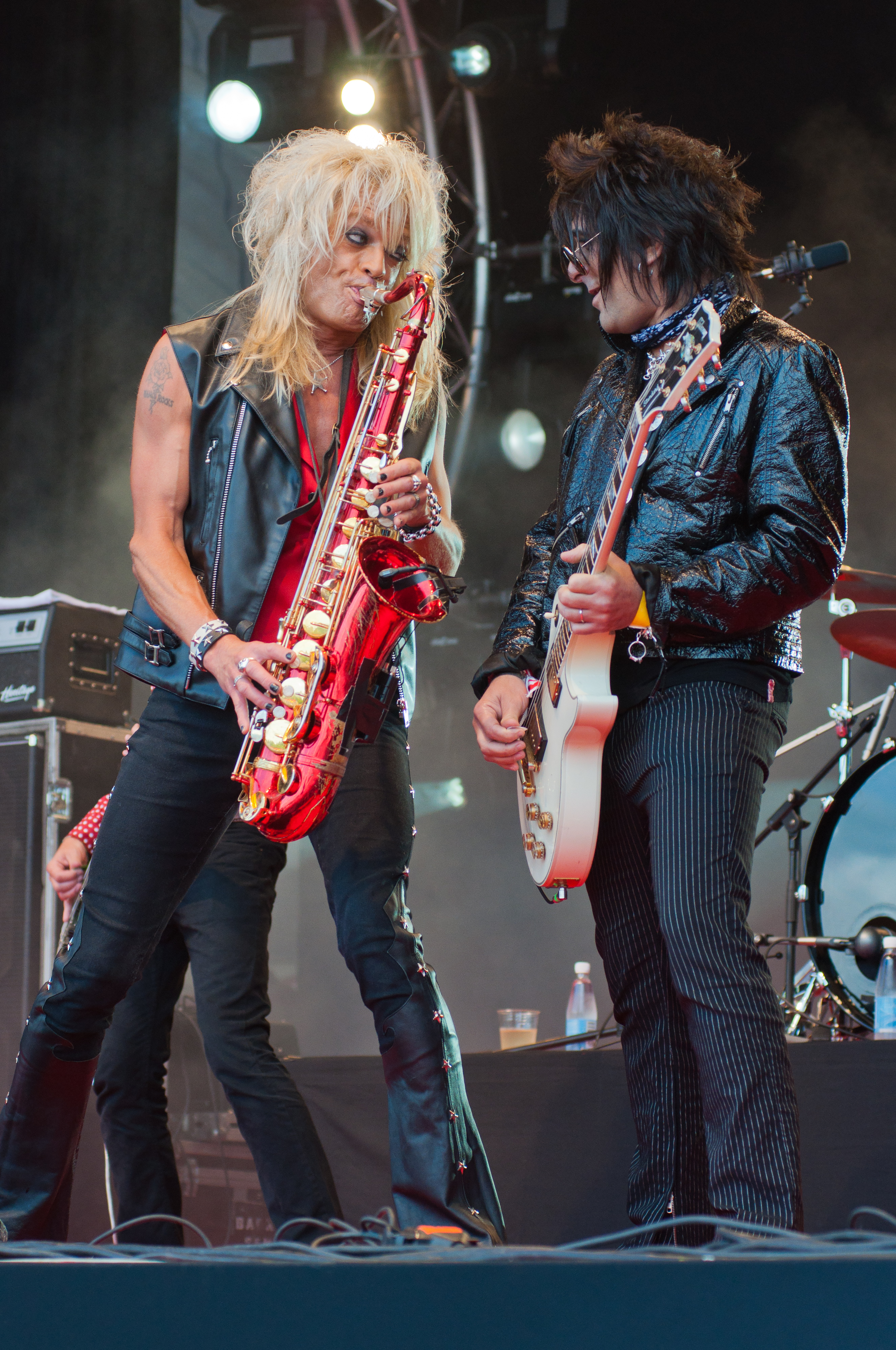
Conte (right) alongside Michael Monroe in 2011

=== Company of Wolves ===
- Company of Wolves (1990, Mercury Records)
- Shakers and Tambourines (1998, Ryf Records)
- Steryl Spycase (2001, Ryf Records)
- Rhythm 'n' Booze (2026 (recorded 1991), Bad Reputation)

=== Billy Squier ===
- Tell the Truth (1993, Capitol Records)

=== Crown Jewels ===
- Spitshine (1996, Thunderdog Recordings)
- Linoleum (1998, Thunderdog Recordings)
- "Bubble and Squeak" – a Best Of compilation with two unreleased tracks (2000, Thunderdog Recordings)

=== Peter Wolf ===
- Fool's Parade (1998, Mercury): Steve Conte, guitar & vocals

=== The Contes ===
- Bleed Together (2003, Thunderdog Recordings)

=== New York Dolls ===
- Morrissey Presents: Return of the New York Dolls Live from Royal Festival Hall (2004, Attack Records)
- One Day It Will Please Us to Remember Even This (2006, Roadrunner Records)
- New York Dolls – Live at the Fillmore East (2008, Sony/BMG Records)
- Cause I Sez So (2009, Atco Records)

=== Steve Conte & The Crazy Truth ===
- Steve Conte & The Crazy Truth (2009 Varèse Sarabande)

=== With Michael Monroe ===
- Another Night in the Sun: Live in Helsinki (2010 Spinefarm Records)
- Sensory Overdrive (2011 Spinefarm Records)
- Horns and Halos (2013 Spinefarm Records)
- Blackout States (2015 Spinefarm Records)
- One Man Gang (2019)
- I Live Too Fast to Die Young (2022)
- Outerstellar (2026)

=== Steve Conte ===
- Steve Conte NYC Album (2014 Thunderdog Recordings)
- Steve Conte International Coverup (2016 Thunderdog Recordings)
- Gimme Gimme Rockaway (2017 single, Wicked Cool Records)
- Recovery Doll (2021 single, Wicked Cool Records)
- Bronx Cheer (2021 album, Wicked Cool Records)
- Fourth of July by Conte/Partridge (2023 single, Wicked Cool Records)
- Girl with No Name (2023 single, Wicked Cool Records)
- I'm Fading Away (2023, credits theme for Like a Dragon Gaiden: The Man Who Erased His Name)
- The Concrete Jangle (2024 album, Wicked Cool Records)
