= Stevie Stiletto and the Switchblades =

Legendary Florida Punk Band

- Origin: Jacksonville, Florida, U.S.
- Genres: Punk rock
- Years active: 1982–2000s

Stevie Stiletto and the Switchblades was an American punk rock band formed in Jacksonville, Florida, in 1982. Founded by vocalist Ray McKelvey, also known as Stevie Stiletto, the band is considered among the earliest punk acts to emerge from the city. They toured extensively and shared stages with bands such as Ramones, Dead Kennedys, Iggy Pop, and Black Flag.

== History ==
Band founder, Ray McKelvey was born in Chelsea, Massachusetts, in 1956 and moved to Jacksonville in 1959. After playing in cover bands during high school, he grew frustrated with the lack of a punk scene in North Florida. In 1982, he formed Stevie Stiletto and the Switchblades, inspired by the emerging punk movement.

The band became known for live shows that included the use of props such as shaving cream cans and fire extinguishers. Their music blended traditional punk energy with elements of Southern rock and featured politically charged and humorous lyrics.

Facing limited venue options, the band often performed in National Guard armories and community centers. They eventually opened their own venue, the 730 Club, to support Jacksonville’s punk scene.

== Touring and Influence ==
Throughout the 1980s and 1990s, Stevie Stiletto and the Switchblades toured across the United States and Europe. They shared stages with notable punk acts including, Ramones, Dead Kennedys, Iggy Pop, Black Flag, and Circle Jerks. Despite frequent lineup changes and McKelvey’s health struggles, the band remained active for over two decades.

Their activity has been noted in local media as influential in the growth of Florida’s punk scene.

== Discography ==
- 13 Hits and More (1986, Cassette)
- Playin’ Favorites (1991, CD)
- Absolutely Live (1992, Cassette)
- Dying in Dyin’ Town (1995, CD)

== Legacy ==
Stevie Stiletto and the Switchblades have been described as important contributors to Jacksonville’s early punk movement. McKelvey continued performing under the Stevie Stiletto name until his passing in 2013. In 2009, the documentary My Life Is Great: The Stevie Stiletto Story chronicled McKelvey’s life and career, featuring interviews with bandmates and musicians from the Florida punk scene.
