= Peace of Mind (Michael Monroe album) =

Studio album by Michael Monroe
- Released: 1996
- Recorded: 1995–1996
- Studios: Finnvox Studios, Helsinki, Finland; Redwood Studios, London, England
- Genres: Hard rock, glam punk, glam metal
- Length: 33:01
- Label: Dead Line Music
- Producer: Michael Monroe

Michael Monroe chronology
Not Fakin' It (1989)	Peace of Mind (1996)	Life Gets You Dirty (1999)

Peace of Mind is the third studio album by Finnish glam rock singer Michael Monroe released in 1996. The album was re-issued and made available worldwide on a widespread release only on March 14, 2000.

The album was produced by Michael Monroe himself, though the two demo bonus tracks were produced, arranged and mixed by the late Stiv Bators of the Dead Boys, who also contributed vocals to both tracks, and were recorded in 1985, prior to his death in 1990.

== Track listing ==
No.	Title	Writer(s)	Length
1.	"Where's the Fire John?"	Michael Monroe, Jude Wilder, Ölli Hildén	4:01
2.	"Make It Go Away"	Monroe, Wilder	3:01
3.	"Machine Gun Etiquette" (The Damned cover)	Rat Scabies, Captain Sensible, Dave Vanian, Algy Ward	1:55
4.	"Always Right"	Monroe, Wilder	5:21
5.	"Relationship Wrecked"	Monroe, Wilder	3:55
6.	"Loneliness Loves Me More"	Monroe, Wilder	3:56
7.	"Kick Out the Jams" (MC5 cover)	Dennis Thompson, Michael Davis, Rob Tyner, Fred "Sonic" Smith, Wayne Kramer	2:25
8.	"Not Anymore" (The Dead Boys cover)	Stiv Bators, Cheetah Chrome, Jimmy Zero	3:38
9.	"Rent Free"	Monroe, Wilder	2:42
10.	"Peace of Mind"	Monroe	2:01
Total length:			33:01

2000 re-issue bonus tracks
No.	Title	Length
11.	"I Wanna Be With You" (Raspberries cover, featuring Stiv Bators)
12.	"It's a Lie" (featuring Stiv Bators)

== Personnel ==
- Michael Monroe - lead vocals, lead & rhythm guitars, acoustic guitar, bass, harmonica, flute, saxophone
- Jimmy Clark - drums, shakers, backing vocals
- Ölli Hildén - rhythm guitar (on tracks 2–3, 6–7, 9), backing vocals
- T.T. Oksala - acoustic guitar on track 4; engineer
- Jude Wilder - backing vocals
- Stiv Bators - additional vocals on "I Wanna Be With You" and "It's a Lie"
