= Rich Jones (musician) =

English guitarist (born 1973)

Rich Jones is an English guitarist born in Coventry in 1973. He has since played music worldwide and lived in Toronto, Vancouver, Los Angeles, London, and Berlin. He now lives in Toronto with his family.

== Career ==
Jones was a founding member and principal songwriter of the Canadian punk band The Black Halos from 1993 to 2001, and played in the British punkabilly band The Yo-Yos (2005), and the American punk bands Amen (2002–2005) and Sorry and the Sinatras (2007–2009). In addition, he toured and recorded with Alec Empire, Canadian singer-songwriter Neil Leyton, and The Dogs D'Amour, as well as doing artwork for Michael Monroe, Killing Joke, Amen, and Eureka Machines.

Jones also appears as a guest guitarist on the Therapy? album Shameless. When he lived in London, he played and recorded with Wildhearts frontman Ginger, The Loyalties with ex Yo-Yo Tom Spencer, and Sorry and the Sinatras with Scott Sorry (ex-Amen). In 2012, he produced a record for the band Radio Dead Ones.

In the summer of 2013, Jones stood in for former Backyard Babies guitarist Dregen in Michael Monroe's band for a series of live dates that ran until December of that year. In March 2014, it was announced that he would join Michael Monroe's band as a full-time member.

== Discography ==
Albums

- Black Halos - Black Halos (Die Young Stay Pretty Records 1999)
- John Ford - John Ford (Bumstead/EMI 2000)
- The Violent Years - Black Halos (Sub Pop/Warner Music 2001)
- Death Before Musick - Amen (Eaturmusic/Columbia 2003)
- Bullets For Dreamers - John Ford (Bumstead 2003)
- Gun of a Preacher Man - Amen (Secret Records 2004)
- Unleashed - The Dogs D'Amour (King Outlaw Records 2006)
- So Much For Soho - The Loyalties (Devil's Jukebox/Vinyl Junkie/Yeah Right 2008)
- Til The Death of Rock & Roll - The Loyalties (self-released, 2013)
- The Frankenstein Effect - Mutation (Ipecac Recordings 2013)
- Albion - The Ginger Wildheart Band (Round Records 2014)
- Blackout States - Michael Monroe (Universal Music, Spinefarm Records 2015)
- The Best - Michael Monroe (Universal Music, Spinefarm Records 2017, compilation)
- One Man Gang - Michael Monroe (Silver Lining/Warner Music 2019)

EPs

- Xmas EP - The Black Halos/Bubble (ChangesOne 2001)
- Given Up Giving Up - The Yo-Yos (Undergroove 2005)
- One-Take Wonders - The Loyalties (Self released/Fading Ways 2006)
- Dead Fashion Brigade - Neil Leyton (Fading Ways 2007)
- The Kings of Shambles Street - Sorry & The Sinatras (Bomber Music 2012)

DVDs

- Caught in the Act - Amen (Secret 2004)

Guest appearances

- Shameless - Therapy? (guitar and backing vocals on "This One's For You", 2001)
- Rockets & Volcanoes - Bubble (guitar on "Days Like These", 2001)
- Brijitte West & The Desperate Hopefuls - Brijitte West & The Desperate Hopefuls (guitar and vocals on "Mess of Myself" and "How To Be Good", 2010)
- Error 500 - Mutation (backing vocals and design, 2013)
