= Karl Rosqvist =

Swedish drummer

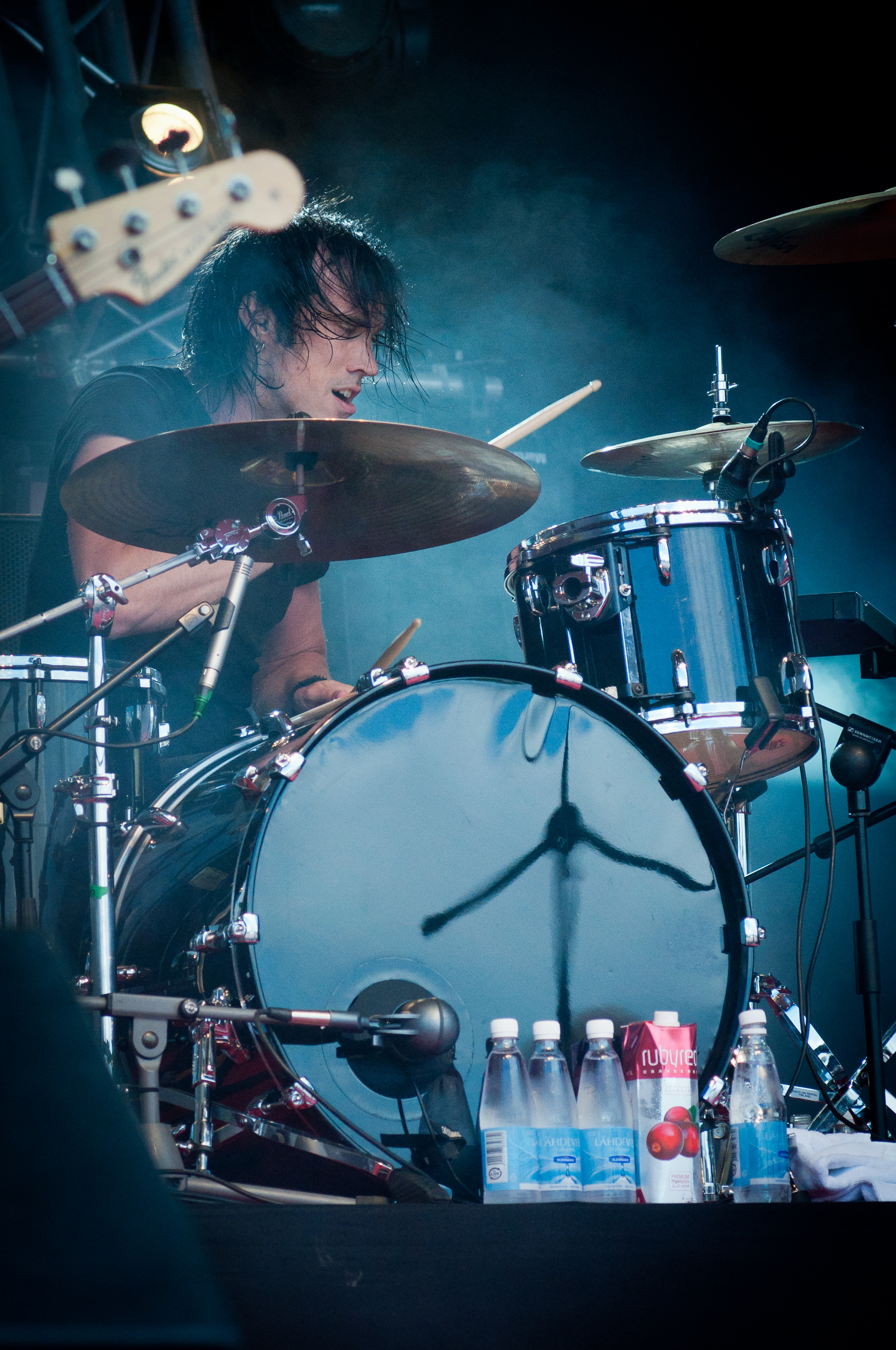
Rosqvist performing at the 2011 Ilosaarirock festival

Karl Rosqvist, also known as Karl Rockfist, is a Swedish drummer. He played in the Swedish metal band Sorg in the early to mid 1990s.

In 2001, he joined the California-based band Steel Prophet who are considered pioneers in the American power metal scene. He recorded two studio albums with Steel Prophet. Both were released by Nuclear Blast Records worldwide.

In 2004, he became a member of the Los Angeles band The Chelsea Smiles who signed a recording contract with Capitol Records / EMI. Rosqvist appears on all three releases by The Chelsea Smiles.

In 2007, he was the touring drummer in the metal band Danzig. He also performed Misfits songs live with original singer Glenn Danzig and guitarist Doyle Wolfgang Von Frankenstein. He also plays drums on the Danzig record Black Laden Crown released in 2017.

He is also the drummer in the horror punk band Son of Sam and appears on their second release Into the Night which was released by Horror High Records in 2008. The band is considered an "all star band" which featured Steve Zing of Samhain and Todd Youth from Murphy's Law.

In 2009, he played drums as part of the Cheap Trick show Sgt. Pepper Live in Las Vegas, performing with artists such as the five time platinum selling recording artist Joan Osborne and the Las Vegas Philharmonics.

In 2009, Rosqvist was also seen backing up Guns N' Roses piano player Dizzy Reed in his solo band along with fellow The Chelsea Smiles bandmates Todd Youth and Johnny Martin.

In 2010, Rosqvist joined the legendary rock singer Michael Monroe's band. The band consists of ex- Hanoi Rocks member Sami Yaffa on bass, Ginger from The Wildhearts on guitar and Steve Conte from The New York Dolls on guitar. In 2011 Ginger was replaced by Swedish guitarist Dregen of Hellacopters and Backyard Babies fame.

In August, it was announced that legendary producer Jack Douglas (Aerosmith, John Lennon) would be producing Monroe's 2011 studio album.

In September, Michael Monroe signed a recording deal with Universal Music, who will distribute Monroe's upcoming studio and live albums.

In 2010, the first single "American Dream" was released on One Voice by Capricorn, a band formed by Karl, Phil Caivano (of Monster Magnet) and Todd Youth (of Murphy's Law, Danzig, Ace Frehley, Glen Campbell and The Chelsea Smiles).

The Michael Monroe record Sensory Overdrive topped the Finnish albums chart on its first week of release and spent 22 weeks in the Top 4. On 9 November 2011 Sensory Overdrive won the "Album of the Year" award at the 2011 Classic Rock Magazine awards.

== Discography ==
- Sorg "I Mina Drömmars Dal" (1995)
- Sorg "Devastated Light" (1996)
- Steel Prophet "Book of The Dead", Nuclear Blast Records (2000)
- Steel Prophet "Unseen", Nuclear Blast Records (2001)
- Various Artists "A Metal Crusade" – Tribute To Saxon, Dwell Records (2001)
- Vindikation "Chamber of Discontent" (2004)
- The Chelsea Smiles "Nowhere Ride EP", EMI/ Capitol Records (2005)
- The Chelsea Smiles "Thirty Six Hours Later", Acetate Records/People Like You (2006)
- Annapolis Soundtrack – Nowhere Ride – The Chelsea Smiles – (2006)
- Flatout 2 In-Game Soundtrack – Nowhere Ride – The Chelsea Smiles – (2006)
- Park Soundtrack – Nowhere Ride – The Chelsea Smiles – (2006)
- Jimmy Williams "Sonic Divergence", Guitar Nine Records (2007)
- Greetings From Los Angeles (Compilation), Acetate Records (2008)
- Son of Sam "Into The Night", Horror High Records (2008)
- The Chelsea Smiles (Self Titled), Demolition Records (2009)
- Michael Monroe "Another Night In The Sun- Live in Helsinki", Spinefarm/Universal Music (2010)
- Capricorn "American Dream 7 inch", One Voice Records (2010)
- Michael Monroe "Sensory Overdrive", Spinefarm/ Universal Music (2011)
- Michael Monroe "'78". Single/7-inch, Spinefarm/Universal Music (2011)
- Michael Monroe "Superpowered Superfly". Single/7-inch, Spinefam/Universal Music (2011)
- Michael Monroe "Trick of The Wrist", Single/7-inch, Spinefarm/Universal Music (2011)
- Michael Monroe "Ballad of The Lower East Side", Single, Spinefarm/Universal Music (2013)
- Michael Monroe "Eighteen Angels", Single. Spinefarm/Universal Music (2013)
- Michael Monroe "Horns & Halos", Spinefarm/Universal Music (2013)
- Michael Monroe "Blackout States", Spinefarm/Universal Music (2015)
- Dregen (selftitled), Universal Music (2013)
- Dregen "Flat tyre on a muddy road", Single/7-inch, Universal Music (2013)
- Michael Monroe "Stained Glass Heart" Single/7-inch, Universal Music (2013)
- Michael Monroe "The Best", Spinefarm/Universal Music (2017)
- Danzig "Black Laden Crown", Nuclear Blast/ Evilive Records (2017)
- Christian Martucci "Negative Balance" (2019)
- Michael Monroe "One Man Gang", Silver Lining Music (2019)
