= Jetboy =

American rock band

- Origin: San Francisco, California
- Genres: Rock, glam metal, hard rock
- Years active: 1983–1993, 2006–present
- Labels: MCA Records; Perris Records; Cleopatra Records; Rumble Records
- Members: Mickey Finn
- Past members: Fernie Rod; Todd Crew; Sami Yaffa; Bill Fraenza; Rick Davis; Michael Butler; Paul Scavuzzo; Tim Huthert; Jeff Moscone; Doug Hovan; D.K. Revelle; Jes Farnsworth; Jesus Mendez Jr; Billy Rowe; Jimmie Romero; Ron Tostenson; Charles Norman
- Website: Jetboyrocks.com

Jetboy is an American, San Francisco-based, hard rock band, founded in 1983 by guitarists Billy Rowe and Fernie Rod. Jetboy got the attention of music fans and record executives in Hollywood during the mid-1980s. The band moved to Los Angeles in 1986 after signing a deal with Elektra Records. Their musical influences ranged from punk rock to rock 'n' roll to blues. Their 1988 debut album Feel the Shake peaked at 135 on Billboard 200.

After original bass player Todd Crew departed in mid-1987, the band was joined by former Hanoi Rocks member Sami Yaffa. Yaffa, a member of one of the groups Jetboy had found most influential, was now a member of the band as their new bassist. In July 1987, Todd Crew died due to a drug overdose in the hotel room of Guns N' Roses guitarist Slash. Jetboy continued on into the 1990s before disbanding in 1992.

Jetboy has continued to gain in popularity, and has continuously played to large crowds at festivals across the United States including Rocklahoma, The South Texas Rock Fest, Rock the Bayou and the M3 Festival twice.

On June 1, 2012, Jetboy did a 25-year reunion for their debut album 'Feel The Shake' at the Whisky a Go Go in Hollywood. The show was also a release party for the movie Rock of Ages which featured a few images of Jetboy. The line-up for this show included all original members with a surprise appearance by their second bass player Sami Yaffa who is currently playing in the Michael Monroe Band. This was the first time they all shared the stage together in over 20 years. Jetboy continued with the original line-up with Charles Norman on bass, who had replaced Yaffa, for the Damned Nation tour in 1990.

On January 25, 2014, during the weekend of the NAMM Show Jetboy supported Faster Pussycat at the Whisky A Go-Go to a sold-out crowd to celebrate the club's 50-year anniversary. The band performed at Riki Rachtman's Cathouse Live on August 15, 2015, at the Irvine Meadows Amphitheater in Irvine, California.

Three songs from Feel the Shake were featured in the 1989 movie The 'Burbs, starring Tom Hanks. They were "Bloodstone", "Locked in a Cage" and "Make Some Noise". Additionally, two songs from Feel the Shake, "Feel the Shake" and "Make Some Noise" were also featured in the 1989 movie She's Out of Control.

"Feel the Shake" was the goal celebration song of the NHL's Philadelphia Flyers from 2019-20 through 2021.

The group's most recent album, Born to Fly, was released January 25, 2019, through Frontiers Records.

== Members ==
Current

- Mickey Finn – vocals, harmonica, tambourine (1983–1993, 2006–2010, 2010–present)
- Billy Rowe – rhythm and slide guitar, backing vocals (1983–1993, 2006–present)
- Jimmie Romero – lead and rhythm guitar, backing vocals (1983 –present)
- Al Serrato – drums (2015–present)
- Eric Stacy – bass guitar (2016–present)

Former

- Ron Tostenson – drums, backing vocals (1983–1992, 2006–2007, 2010–2015)
- Todd Crew – bass guitar, backing vocals (1983–1987; died 1987)
- Sami Yaffa – bass guitar, backing vocals (1987–1990)
- Charles Norman – bass guitar (1990–1991, 2010)
- Bill Fraenza – bass guitar, backing vocals (1991–1993)
- Rick Davis – drums (1992–1993)
- Michael Butler – bass guitar (2006–2009)
- Paul Scavuzzo – drums (2006)
- Tim Huthert – drums (2007)
- Jeff Moscone – drums (2007–2008)
- Doug Hovan – drums (2008–2009)
- D.K. Revelle – vocals (2010)
- Jesus Mendez Jr. – drums (2010–2012)
- Jessie Farnsworth – bass (2010–2012)

== Discography ==
=== Studio albums ===
- Feel the Shake (1988)
- Damned Nation (1990)
- A Day in the Glamorous Life (1998)
- Make Some More Noise (1999)
- One More for Rock N' Roll (2002)
- Off Your Rocker (2010)
- Born to Fly (2019)
- Crate Diggin' (2023)

=== Singles ===
- "Make Some Noise" (1988)
- "Feel the Shake" (1988)
- "Evil" (1990)
- "Stomp It (Down to the Bricks)" (1990)
- "Heavy Chevy" (1990)

=== Compilation albums ===
- Lost & Found (1999)
- Now and Then (2007)

=== Live DVDs ===
- The Glam Years - Movie and CD (2007)
