= Sami Yaffa =

Finnish bassist (born 1963)

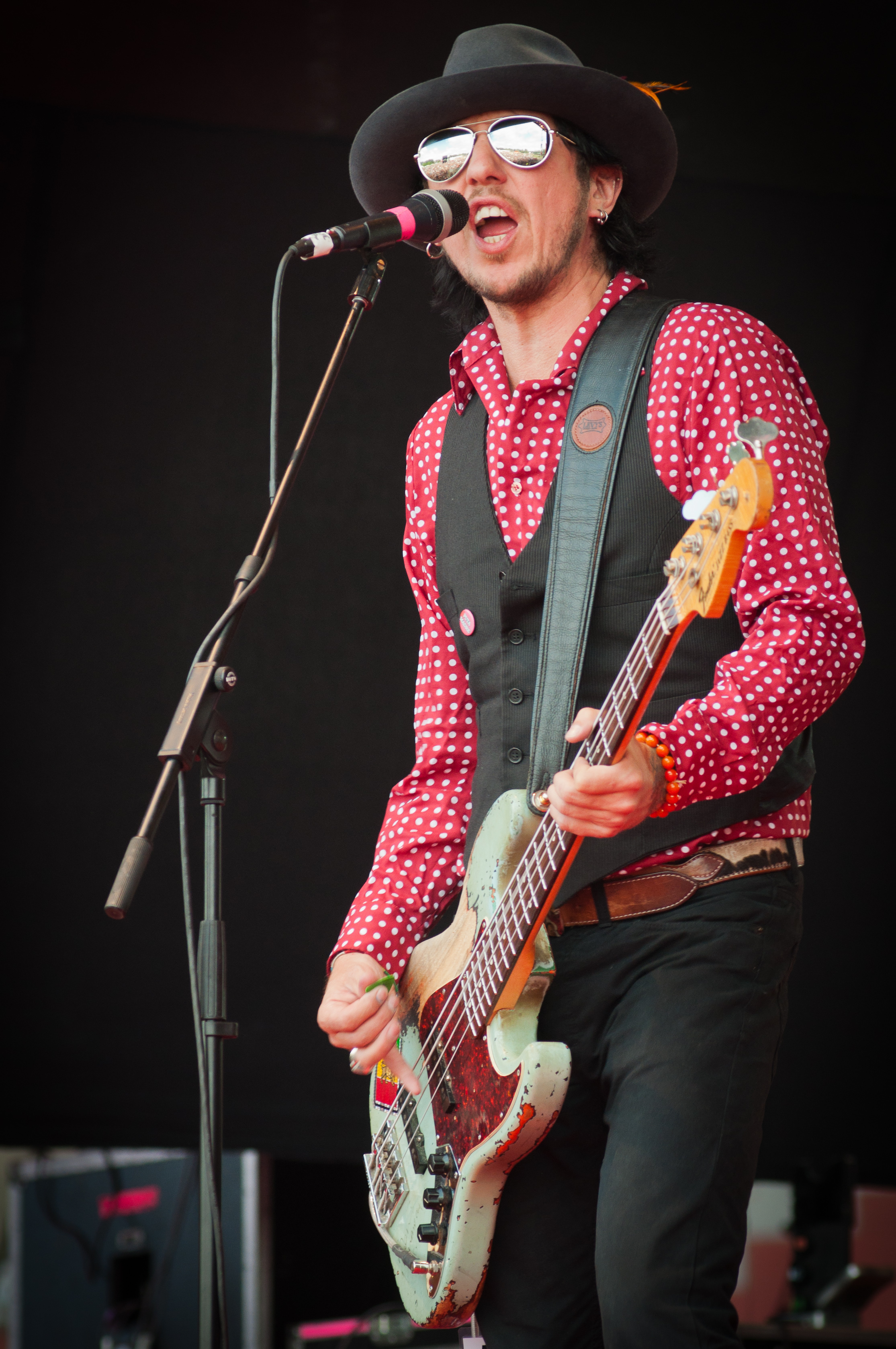
- Yaffa at Ilosaarirock 2011

Background information
- Born: Sami Lauri Takamäki; 4 September 1963 (age 62); Espoo, Finland
- Genres: Rock; glam punk; glam rock; blues
- Occupation: Bassist
- Years active: 1977–present
- Member of: Michael Monroe; Demolition 23
- Formerly of: Hanoi Rocks; New York Dolls; Joan Jett and the Blackhearts; Jerusalem Slim; Mad Juana; Jetboy; Pelle Miljoona Oy; The Compulsions; Smack

Sami Yaffa (born Sami Lauri Takamäki; 4 September 1963) is a Finnish bass guitarist best known for his work in New York Dolls, Joan Jett & the Blackhearts, Pelle Miljoona Oy, Michael Monroe's bands, and Hanoi Rocks. He is currently the bassist for the Michael Monroe band and is also concentrating on his solo career.

== Biography ==
Yaffa first began playing music in 1977, when he was fourteen years old, with a band called The Bablers. He went along with another member of the Bablers (Pepe Seivo) and formed a punk rock band, Suopo, in 1979. They did not record any material and stayed relatively unknown even in the Finnish punk rock scene. Around this time Yaffa also played with another Finnish punk rock band, Pohjanoteeraus.

=== Hanoi Rocks ===
In 1980 Yaffa joined future Hanoi Rocks bandmate Andy McCoy in Finnish punk rock band Pelle Miljoona Oy. The two of them took part in the band's most successful album "Moottoritie on kuuma". Both left the group after 9 months to join Hanoi Rocks.

Hanoi Rocks became the biggest band in Finland at the time, releasing a string of successful albums. The group moved from Helsinki to Stockholm in 1980 and then to London in 1982 and continued to gain fans and influence the music scene there. Yaffa played bass in all the Hanoi Rocks albums released in 1980s. In London, Yaffa, along with Hanoi Rocks bandmates Nasty Suicide and Razzle, as well as Knox of the Vibrators, recorded an album under the name Fallen Angels. Knox continued to perform as Fallen Angels after, though the Hanoi Rocks members including Yaffa never played with the band on stage.

=== Playing with Johnny Thunders and Jetboy ===
After Razzle's death in 1984, Yaffa left Hanoi Rocks and formed Chain Gang with Pelle Almgren in Stockholm. They recorded one EP under the name Pelle Almgren & Sam Yaffa. The year 1987 saw Yaffa doing a couple of gigs with then London-based Johnny Thunders and Jerry Nolan, both of the legendary group New York Dolls.

In April 1987 he was asked to join San Francisco-based band Jetboy. He joined the band and stayed with them until 1990. He recorded two albums with Jet Boy: "Feel The Shake" and "Damned Nation". Although Jetboy toured all over the States, Yaffa still found time to play with Johnny Thunders' band on his US tour and with a group called Stronzo with Timo Kaltio, Marc Ford of the Black Crowes and Craig Ross of Lenny Kravitz's band. While living and working in Los Angeles he got reconnected with Michael Monroe and played a show with Michael Monroe's in Los Angeles in 1988 featuring Marc Ford and Craig Ross.

In 1989 Yaffa briefly joined a Finnish band, Smack, who had moved to Los Angeles. He played bass on tracks "Can You Dig It" and "Crazy River". He was credited as Ulan Bator for contractual reasons with Jetboy who was at the time signed to MCA records and was asked not to use his real name.

=== Jerusalem Slim ===
Yaffa moved to New York City in 1990 to join Hanoi Rocks frontman Michael Monroe and started a new band Jerusalem Slim. The group also featured Billy Idol's guitarist, Steve Stevens. The band broke up in 1992, because of Michael Monroe's and Sami's musical disagreements with Steve Stevens. Jerusalem Slim released one album.

From 1990 to 1993 Yaffa played frequently with a band called Love Pirates with Gass Wylde of the Pretenders and Manish Boys. Between 1991 and 1994 Yaffa also played in Alison Gordy's band. Gordy had earlier played with Johnny Thunders. Yaffa played on Gordy's album Blonde and Blue.

=== Demolition 23, Mad Juana, Joan Jett and Murphy's Law ===
In 1993 Michael Monroe and Sami Yaffa started a new band Demolition 23. The band also featured guitarist Jay Henning (Star Star) and drummer Jimmy Clark (Scandal). Henning was later replaced with Nasty Suicide. Demolition 23 recorded one album produced by Little Steven. The group broke up with only one album in 1995. Earlier in 1993 Yaffa and Monroe recorded Steppenwolf's song "Magic Carpet Ride" with Guns N' Roses guitarist Slash for the movie Coneheads.

In 1995, Yaffa formed Mad Juana (briefly known as Lewt Vagrant) with his wife Karmen Guy. Yaffa described the band's sound as "Think of the Pogues meets (the) Clash with all acoustic instruments. Beautiful female voice in a Velvet Underground dungeon.". The following year he played bass on an album by Jan Stenfors, aka Hanoi Rocks' Nasty Suicide.

From 2000 to 2002, Yaffa played in the New York-based band Vasquez with former DGeneration guitarist Richard Bacchus. Along with drummer Eric Kuby, this trio released one CD, titled "Two Songs" Sami also played on, produced and recorded Ricky Bacchus's first solo album "Luckiest Girls". In 2001-2002 Yaffa toured in the United States and in Japan with Murphy's Law. He joined Joan Jett and The Blackhearts in 2002 and toured with her until 2004 and played on album Naked.

=== New York Dolls, Michael Monroe and The Compulsions with the members of Guns N' Roses ===
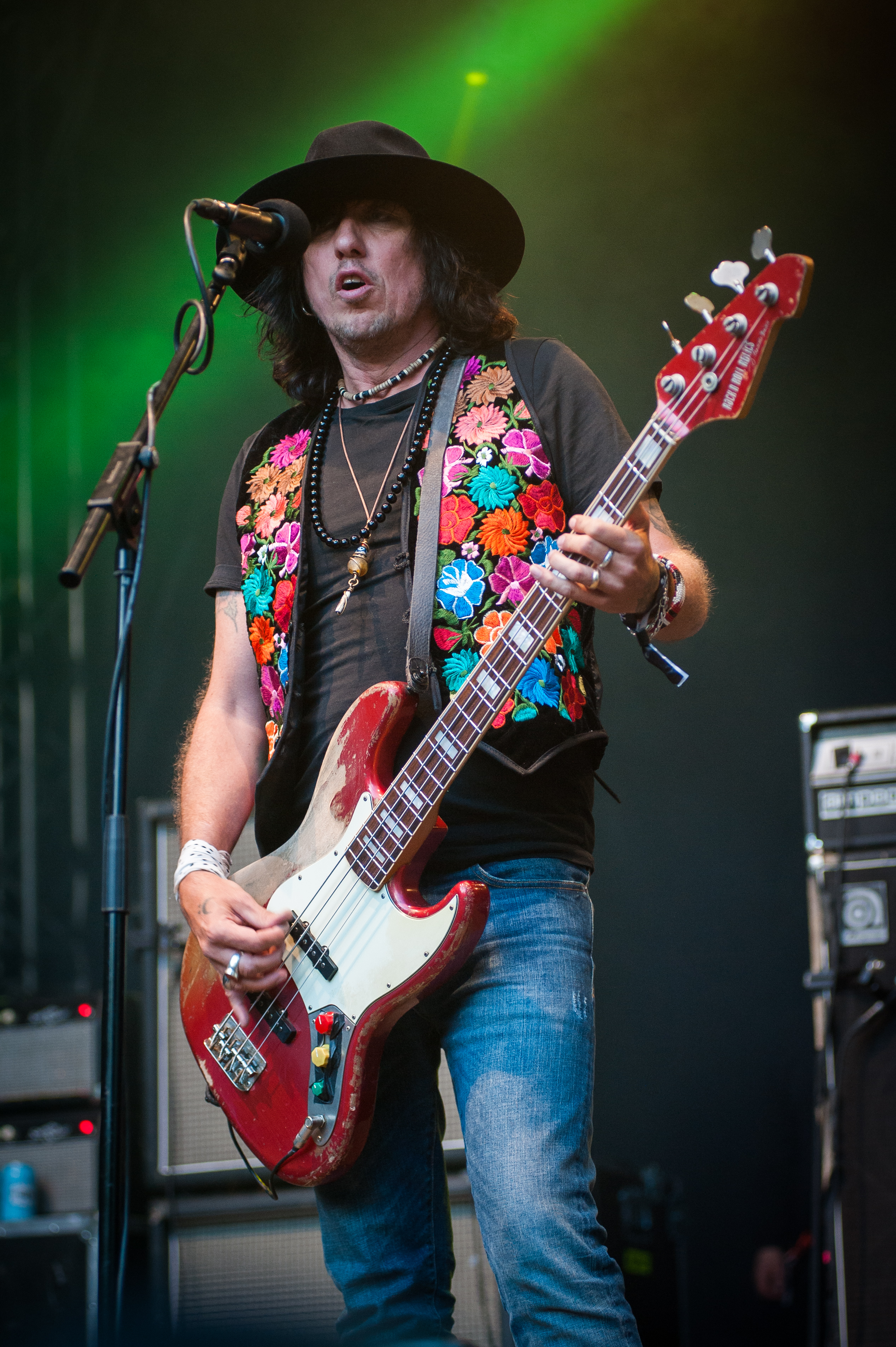
Yaffa with Michael Monroe's band in 2018

In 2004, Yaffa joined the legendary punk/rock band New York Dolls. In 2006, when not working with the revamped New York Dolls, Yaffa also toured as a member of Jesse Malin's backing band and played on Jesse's album "Glitter In The Gutter". On 25 January 2010, ex-Hanoi Rocks singer Michael Monroe, Sami Yaffa, Jimmy Clark, Ginger Wildheart and Todd Youth held a press conference in Los Angeles, introducing a new band named after the lead singer.

The band went through some changes with Youth and Clark leaving the band to be replaced by Danzig drummer Karl Rockfist and Sami's New York Dolls guitarist friend Steve Conte. Live album "Another Night In The Sun" was released in late September, and their first studio album Sensory Overdrive, produced by Jack Douglas was released in 2011. On 9 November 2011, Sensory Overdrive won the "Album of the Year" award at the 2011 Classic Rock magazine award. The first single, 78' from the album was chosen as the "Rock Song of the Year" by iTunes USA and Little Steven's Underground Garage Radio Shows listeners voted 'Trick of the Wrist' the "Coolest Song of the Year".

In 2011, Yaffa joined the American band The Compulsions briefly. The band included Richard Fortus and Frank Ferrer of Guns N' Roses on guitar and drums and singer/songwriter Rob Carlyle on guitar and vocals.

In 2012, Sami Yaffa was a co-host for Anthony Bourdain's No Reservations. In the sixth episode of season eight Yaffa travelled to Helsinki with Anthony Bourdain to show him all his favourite culinary spots and other strange places Finland. In 2014, Yaffa hosted a music-related travel television series Sami Yaffa: Sound Tracker on Yle Teema, where he explored music and culture on various parts of the globe. The second season was aired in 2015, third season in 2017. The series became available on Netflix in August 2016. The first two seasons won Finlands equivalent of grammys as the "best music program".

In 2021, Yaffa released his first solo album titled, "The Innermost Journey To Your Outermost Mind". The second solo album titled "Satan's Helpers War Lazer Eyes And The Money Pig Circus" was released in March 2024 through Vallila Music House and Cargo Records.
