= This One's for Rock'n'roll – The Best of Hanoi Rocks 1980–2008 =

This One's for Rock'n'Roll – The Best of Hanoi Rocks 1980–2008

Greatest hits album by Hanoi Rocks
- Released: 26 November 2008
- Recorded: 1980–2008
- Genre: Glam punk; hard rock
- Label: Johanna Kustannus, Backstage Alliance

Hanoi Rocks chronology
Street Poetry (2007)	This One's for Rock'n'Roll – The Best of Hanoi Rocks 1980–2008 (2008)

This One's for Rock'n'Roll – The Best of Hanoi Rocks 1980–2008 is a 2CD retrospective compilation album by Finnish hard rock band Hanoi Rocks, and also the band's last album before their second breakup, released on 26 November 2008 in Japan and 17 December 2008 worldwide. The album features 33 songs from both the original incarnation of the band and the incarnation from the new millennium since the 2002 reunion.

== Track listing ==
=== CD 1 (1980–1985) ===
1. "Lost in the City" – 3:53
2. "Tragedy" – 4:05
3. "11th Street Kids" – 4:02
4. "Oriental Beat" – 3:09
5. "No Law or Order" – 3:42
6. "Motorvatin'" – 3:15
7. "Taxi Driver" – 4:17
8. "Café Avenue" – 3:27
9. "Love's an Injection" – 3:27
10. "Back to Mystery City" – 4:57
11. "Until I Get You" – 4:39
12. "Malibu Beach Nightmare" – 2:48
13. "Up Around the Bend" – 3:09
14. "Don't You Ever Leave Me" – 4:05
15. "High School" – 3:53
16. "Underwater World" – 5:18
17. "Boulevard of Broken Dreams" – 4:07
18. "Million Miles Away" – 4:47

=== CD 2 (2001–2008) ===
1. "People Like Me" – 2:57
2. "A Day Late, a Dollar Short" – 3:06
3. "Obscured" – 4:11
4. "In My Darkest Moment" – 4:22
5. "Back in Yer Face" – 3:37
6. "Better High" – 3:22
7. "You Make the Earth Move" – 3:36
8. "Eternal Optimist" – 3:33
9. "Center of My Universe" – 4:44
10. "Hypermobile" – 4:07
11. "Fashion" – 3:18
12. "This One's for Rock'n'Roll" – 3:46
13. "Teenage Revolution" – 3:37
14. "Worldshaker" – 2:57
15. "Grin and Bear It" – 3:04

== Personnel ==
Hanoi Rocks

- Michael Monroe – lead vocals, saxophone, piano, keyboards, harmonica, harp (all tracks)
- Andy McCoy – lead guitar, piano, backing vocals (all tracks)
- Nasty Suicide – rhythm guitar, backing vocals (CD 1: 1–18)
- Sam Yaffa – bass (CD 1: 1–18)
- Gyp Casino – drums, percussion (CD 1: tracks 1–9)
- Razzle – drums, percussion, backing vocals (CD 1: tracks 10–18)
- Costello Hautamäki – rhythm guitar, backing vocals (CD 2: tracks 1–4)
- Timpa – bass, backing vocals (CD 2: tracks 1–4)
- Lacu – drums, percussion (CD 2: 1–15)
- Conny Bloom – rhythm guitar, backing vocals (CD 2: tracks 5–15)
- Andy Christell – bass, backing vocals (CD 2: tracks 5–15)

== Release history ==
Country	Release date
Japan	26 November 2008
Worldwide	17 December 2008
