= The Best of Hanoi Rocks =

Compilation album by Hanoi Rocks
- Released: 1985 (LP, EP), 1988 (CD)
- Recorded: 1981–1984
- Genre: Glam punk; Hard rock
- Label: Lick Records, AAB

Hanoi Rocks chronology
Rock & Roll Divorce (1985)	The Best of Hanoi Rocks (1985)	Twelve Shots on the Rocks (2002)

The Best of Hanoi Rocks is the first compilation album by the Finnish rock band Hanoi Rocks. The record was released in 1985, the same year the original Hanoi Rocks broke up. The band's founders, vocalist Michael Monroe and guitarist Andy McCoy, would ultimately reunite in 2001 and reform Hanoi Rocks, until the band's final break-up in 2009.

== Track listing ==
No.	Title	Writer(s)	Length
1.	"Two Steps from the Move"	Andy McCoy	2:39
2.	"Don't You Ever Leave Me"	Andy McCoy	4:05
3.	"Malibu Beach Nightmare"	Andy McCoy	2:46
4.	"Lost in the City"	Andy McCoy	3:53
5.	"Motorvatin'"	Andy McCoy, Michael Monroe	3:14
6.	"Underwater World"	Andy McCoy, Ian Hunter	5:17
7.	"11th Street Kids" (Live)	Andy McCoy	4:00
8.	"Oriental Beat"	Andy McCoy	3:09
9.	"Until I Get You"	Andy McCoy	3:08
10.	"Back to Mystery City"	Andy McCoy	5:02
11.	"Million Miles Away"	Andy McCoy, Michael Monroe, Bob Ezrin	4:47
12.	"Taxi Driver"	Andy McCoy	4:15
13.	"Tragedy" (Live)	Andy McCoy	4:05

Finnish 12" vinyl edition
No.	Title	Writer(s)	Length
11.	"Malibu Nightmare"	Andy McCoy	2:03
12.	"Do The Duck"	Andy McCoy	2:46
13.	"Hometown Breaktown"	Andy McCoy	4:07
14.	"I Love You"	Andy McCoy

== Personnel ==
Hanoi Rocks

- Michael Monroe - lead vocals, saxophone, harmonica
- Andy McCoy - lead guitar, backing vocals
- Nasty Suicide - rhythm guitar, backing vocals
- Sam Yaffa - bass
- Gyp Casino - drums (Tracks: 4, 5, 7, 8, 12, 13, bonus tracks)
- Razzle - drums (Tracks: 1, 2, 3, 6, 9, 10, 11)

with:

- Morgan Fisher - keyboards (Tracks: 3, 9, 10)
- Miriam Stockley - backing vocals (Tracks: 9)

== Chart positions ==
=== Album ===
Year	Chart	Peak
1985	Finnish Albums Chart	23
