= Rock & Roll Divorce =

Live album by Hanoi Rocks
- Released: September 1985
- Recorded: 19 May 1985
- Genre: Glam punk; Hard rock
- Label: Lick Records
- Producer: Mick Staplehurst

Hanoi Rocks chronology
Two Steps from the Move (1984)	Rock & Roll Divorce (1985)	The Best of Hanoi Rocks (1985)

Professional ratings
Review scores
Source	Rating
AllMusic	link

Rock & Roll Divorce is the second live album by the Finnish rock band Hanoi Rocks, released in 1985. It was recorded at the last concert before the group disbanded in May 1985 at the Rock Arena Festival in Poland. This is also the only Hanoi Rocks album to feature René Berg on bass and Terry Chimes on drums. Michael Monroe was going to leave the band before this album was released, but agreed to do a small tour in Poland, on the condition that a live record wouldn't be released. As a result, Rock & Roll Divorce was a half-official release.

According to Hanoi Rocks' autobiography, the album was the last date of the Polish-tour recorded by Mick Staplehurst, but it was actually taken from several shows, mainly from Gdańsk. Originally put together for the amusement of band members only, Hanoi Rocks' former manager Seppo Vesterinen, has stated that: "Rock & Roll Divorce was an awful record that should have never been released."

== Track listing ==
No.	Title	Writer(s)	Length
1.	"Two Steps from the Move"	Andy McCoy
2.	"Back to Mystery City"	Andy McCoy
3.	"Boulevard of Broken Dreams"	Andy McCoy, Bob Ezrin, Ian Hunter
4.	"Don't You Ever Leave Me"	Andy McCoy
5.	"Tragedy"	Andy McCoy
6.	"Malibu Beach"	Andy McCoy
7.	"Million Miles Away"	Andy McCoy, Bob Ezrin, Michael Monroe
8.	"Taxi Driver"	Andy McCoy
9.	"Up Around the Bend"	John Fogerty
10.	"I Feel Alright"	The Stooges
11.	"Rock & Roll"	René Berg
12.	"Looking at You"	MC5

== Personnel ==
Hanoi Rocks

- Michael Monroe – vocals
- Andy McCoy – guitars
- Nasty Suicide – guitars
- René Berg – bass
- Terry Chimes – drums

== Chart positions ==
=== Album ===
Year	Chart	Peak
1985	Finnish Albums Chart	12
