= All Those Wasted Years =

Live album by Hanoi Rocks
- Released: 1984
- Recorded: December 1983
- Venues: The Marquee Club, London
- Genres: Glam punk; Hard rock
- Length: 70:08
- Labels: Johanna Kustannus, Lick Records, Nippon Phonogram
- Producer: Pete "Overend" Watts

Hanoi Rocks chronology
Back to Mystery City (1983)	All Those Wasted Years (1984)	Two Steps from the Move (1984)

Professional ratings
Review scores
Source	Rating
Allmusic	4/5 stars

All Those Wasted Years is the first live album by the Finnish rock band Hanoi Rocks, released in 1984. In initial pressing of this album's name was misspelled as "All Those Waisted Years", while correct spelling has been used with later releases of this album, but the original release with the misspelled title is very rare. The album was recorded in December 1983 at The Marquee Club in London, about a year before the death of Hanoi Rocks' drummer Razzle. The live engineer was Mick Staplehurst, the longtime FOH Engineer for Hanoi Rocks.

A video of the same shows recorded for the album was released at the same time, but with a different track listing. For example, the video featured a cover of the Ramones song "Blitzkrieg Bop" (which had Razzle on vocals and Michael Monroe on drums). The video is also missing the songs "Visitor", "11th Street Kids" and "Lost in the City"

== Track listing ==
No.	Title	Writer(s)	Length
1.	"Pipeline"	Brian Carman, Bob Spickard	1:57
2.	"Oriental Beat"	Andy McCoy	3:14
3.	"Back to Mystery City"	Andy McCoy	4:32
4.	"Motorvatin'"	Andy McCoy, Michael Monroe	3:21
5.	"Until I Get You"	Andy McCoy	4:33
6.	"Mental Beat"	Andy McCoy	6:06
7.	"Don't Never Leave Me"	Andy McCoy	4:38
8.	"Tragedy"	Andy McCoy	3:48
9.	"Malibu Beach Nightmare"	Andy McCoy	2:53
10.	"Visitor"	Andy McCoy	3:13
11.	"11th Street Kids"	Andy McCoy	4:25
12.	"Taxi Driver"	Andy McCoy	4:39
13.	"Lost in the City"	Andy McCoy	3:50
14.	"Lightnin' Bar Blues"	Hoyt Axton	3:08
15.	"Beer and a Cigarette"	Andy McCoy	3:20
16.	"Under My Wheels"	Michael Bruce, Dennis Dunaway, Bob Ezrin	3:01
17.	"I Feel Alright"	The Stooges	4:45
18.	"Train Kept A-Rollin'"	Tiny Bradshaw, Howard Kay, Lois Mann	2:55

== Personnel ==
Hanoi Rocks

- Michael Monroe – lead vocals, saxophone, harmonica
- Andy McCoy – guitars, vocals
- Nasty Suicide – guitars, vocals
- Sam Yaffa – bass, vocals
- Razzle – drums, vocals

== Chart positions ==
=== Album ===
Year	Chart	Peak
1984	Japanese Albums	51
1984	Finnish Albums (Official Finnish Charts)	15
