= Two Steps from the Move =

Studio album by Hanoi Rocks
- Released: August 7, 1984
- Recorded: March 1984
- Studio: Record Plant, New York, USA
- Genre: Glam metal; glam rock
- Length: 34:02
- Label: CBS
- Producer: Bob Ezrin

Hanoi Rocks chronology
All Those Wasted Years (1984)	Two Steps from the Move (1984)	Rock & Roll Divorce (1985)

Singles from Two Steps from the Move
- 1. "Up Around The Bend" Released: 11 June 1984; 2. "Underwater World" Released: August 1984 (Finland), November 1984 (UK); 3. "Don't You Ever Leave Me" Released: August 1984 (Finland), October 1984 (UK)

Professional ratings
Review scores
Source	Rating
Allmusic	4/5 stars
Soundi	4/5 stars

Two Steps from the Move is the fifth studio album by the Finnish rock band Hanoi Rocks, released in 1984. This is their last album to feature drummer Razzle, before he was killed in a car accident on 8 December 1984. It is also their final album to be released before their break-up in 1985.

== Album information ==
Before this album, all of Hanoi Rocks' albums were released on Lick Records and Johanna Kustannus, but this was the band's first album on a major label, CBS. Originally the album was supposed to be called Silver Missiles And Nightingales, but the name was changed at the last minute. Andy McCoy and Nasty Suicide later used the name as the name of their album, when they worked under the moniker "The Suicide Twins".

The album's producer, Bob Ezrin had previously worked with big-name artists like Pink Floyd, Kiss and Alice Cooper, which was one of the main reasons Hanoi Rocks' wanted him to produce the album. Ezrin wanted the album to have a heavier atmosphere and darker guitar playing than the band's previous efforts, still keeping it melodic and punky, and he also worked on the writing of almost every song on the album. Ezrin knew that a more hard rock style would sell more units in the United States.

The album also features some of Hanoi Rocks' biggest hits, like "Up Around The Bend", "Underwater World", "Boulevard of Broken Dreams", "Million Miles Away" and "Don't You Ever Leave Me". A music video was also made for "Up Around The Bend", which received much airplay on MTV. A music video was also made for "Don't You Ever Leave Me", but the song differs from the album version as it's shorter, has a different guitar-solo and only features Razzle's spoken words in the middle. There was also supposed to be a title-track, but according to Razzle it was replaced with "Up Around the Bend". The song was later released on The Best of Hanoi Rocks compilation, and appears as a bonus track on this albums reissue.

Two Steps from the Move was Hanoi Rocks' biggest hit when it was released, reaching number 28 on the UK Album Charts and the singles "Up Around The Bend" and "Don't You Ever Leave Me" also rose up the singles charts. The album also gave Hanoi Rocks their first gold record in Finland, but not until 1986 after the group had already disbanded. Still, Two Steps from the Move is often considered as a glam rock/hard rock classic.

While touring to promote the album, Hanoi Rocks rose to fame in Japan even more and had two sold-out concerts in New York City. Following drummer Razzle's death, the group canceled their concert dates and eventually broke up, while on the verge of an international breakthrough.

The line "Welcome to the Jungle" featured in the song "Underwater World" arguably inspired the long time Hanoi Rocks-admirer Axl Rose to write the eponymous song for Guns N' Roses due to its similar tone and similar use of fifths (power chords).

The song "Futurama" was later covered by the band Bang Tango.

== Song information ==
Andy McCoy's comments on the songs from a 1984 issue of Suosikki.

=== "Up Around the Bend" ===
"Nasse (Nasty Suicide) liked it. Then one time at rehearsals we were jamming and I remembered it from Nasse's tape. We played it and it sounded fucking good. We figured, let's play it in the set. After a few gigs, we decided that we want it on an LP. The recordings for the album were already over, but I called Bob and he came over to London, where we recorded the song."

=== "High School" ===
"Or like 'Quit High School', like it was originally called. We figured it was a little boring. What do you do? Quit high school just to queue in unemployment line. I didn't like it. It's about this dude, who thinks "why the hell should I sit in school and study, because the system is a piece of shit". There are some funny lines in that song. "I tell the little buggers what to wear, I show them how to set and dye their hair. There will be no costumes at our swimming pool. There will be no ugly girls in my high school". It's a fun song."

=== "I Can't Get It" ===
"It had mine and Ian Hunter's lyrics originally. But in the end Bob looked through it and re-did the whole song. I put some stuff into the song that anybody can relate to. It has good ground, because it's one of the facts of life. There's always things you can't have. But I figured it also has a kind of humorous side to it. Laughter through tears. It's kinda bitter sweet."

=== "Underwater World" ===
"What could I say about it? It's a cool song, it swings. I don't want to say anything about the lyrics. Everybody can have their own interpretation."

=== "Don't You Ever Leave Me" ===
"Well yeah, we fucked up that song so bad back then, that we had to remake it now. As a song, I think it's fucking great and this version is what the original should have been. I think, that we might release it as a single later."

=== "Million Miles Away" ===
"At first it was a love song to Anna (McCoy's then girlfriend), but it built stuff on top of it, - all of my love songs have been made with Anna in mind - but like I said, it's grown from the original version. The song has gotten to flow in development, and doesn't feel so personal anymore."

=== "Boulevard of Broken Dreams" ===
"The song is about junk (drugs). Used to take 'em back in the day. It's about the illusions, with which it all starts, but eventually it leads to broken dreams, when you notice where using them has taken you."

=== "Boiler" ===
"I really dig London's cockney pub-culture and "Boiler" is a pub-song like that. I wanted to capture that feeling that's in pubs. I like that song a fucking lot. The more I play it, the more it seems to fit."

=== "Futurama" ===
"It's a good old sweaty booger."

=== "Cutting Corners" ===
"Everyday life. We take shortcuts in everything. You get off easier, like in school when you cheat on a test by writing the answers on your hand. The same system continues through your life."

== Track listing ==
No.	Title	Writer(s)	Length
1.	"Up Around the Bend"	John Fogerty	3:06
2.	"High School"	Andy McCoy, Bob Ezrin	3:52
3.	"I Can't Get It"	Andy McCoy, Bob Ezrin, Ian Hunter	4:12
4.	"Underwater World"	Andy McCoy	5:16
5.	"Don't You Ever Leave Me"	Andy McCoy	4:05
6.	"Million Miles Away"	Andy McCoy, Bob Ezrin, Michael Monroe	4:47
7.	"Boulevard of Broken Dreams"	Andy McCoy, Bob Ezrin, Ian Hunter	4:03
8.	"Boiler (Me Boiler 'n' Me)"	Hanoi Rocks	4:22
9.	"Futurama"	Andy McCoy, Bob Ezrin	3:08
10.	"Cutting Corners"	Andy McCoy, Bob Ezrin	4:20

Finnish 2004 Remastered Edition
No.	Title	Writer(s)	Length
11.	"Two Steps from the Move"	Andy McCoy	2:39
12.	"Don't You Ever Leave Me" (12" version)	Andy McCoy	4:02
13.	"Oil & Gasoline"	Andy McCoy, Gregg Brown	4:43
14.	"Magic Carpet Ride"	Andy McCoy, Michael Monroe	4:29

UK CD-Release
No.	Title	Writer(s)	Length
11.	"Oriental Beat" (Live)	Andy McCoy	3:14
12.	"Back to Mystery City" (Live)	Andy McCoy	4:32
13.	"Motorvatin'" (Live)	Andy McCoy, Michael Monroe	4:43
14.	"Until I Get You" (Live)	Andy McCoy	4:33
15.	"Mental Beat" (Live)	Andy McCoy	6:06
16.	"11th Street Kids" (Live)	Andy McCoy	4:25
17.	"Tragedy" (Live)	Andy McCoy	3:48
18.	"Malibu Beach" (Live)	Andy McCoy	2:53

2013 Japanese remastered edition
No.	Title	Writer(s)	Length
11.	"Two Steps from the Move" (demo)	Andy McCoy	2:21
12.	"Oil and Gasoline"	Andy McCoy, Gregg Brown	4:44
13.	"Magic Carpet Ride"	Andy McCoy, Michael Monroe	4:31
14.	"Shakes"	Andy McCoy, Bob Ezrin, Ian Hunter	3:25
15.	"Don't You Ever Leave Me" (12" version)	Andy McCoy	4:01
16.	"Never Get Enough" (demo)	Andy McCoy	5:37

== Personnel ==
Hanoi Rocks

- Michael Monroe – lead vocals, saxophone
- Andy McCoy – lead guitar, vocals
- Nasty Suicide – guitars, vocals
- Sam Yaffa – bass, vocals
- Razzle – drums, vocals

Additional personnel

- Bob Ezrin – production, keyboards, percussion, vocals
- Jeni, Lisa, Juliet and Michelle – cheerleaders (possibly backing vocals)

== Production ==
- Producer: Bob Ezrin
- Production co-ordinator: Jo Murray
- Equipment manager: Timo Kaltio
- Guitar technician: Kevin Bell
- Rhythm tracks recorded by: Jay Messina, Tom Swift & Ringo Hrycyna
- Vocals, guitars and rest recorded by: Rod O'Brien, Lenny DeRose and Ringo Hrycyna
- Remixed by Bob Ezrin, Rod O'Brien, Lenny DeRose & Ringo Hrycyna
- "Up Around the Bend" recorded and remixed by David Tickle

== Charts ==
Chart (1984)	Peak position
Finnish Albums (The Official Finnish Charts)	9
Japanese Albums (Oricon)	49
UK Albums (OCC)	28

Chart (2023)	Peak position
Finnish Albums (Suomen virallinen lista)	32
