= Dead by X-Mas =

Single by Hanoi Rocks

from the album Self Destruction Blues
- B-side: "Nothing New"
- Released: December 1981
- Recorded: August 1981
- Genre: Rock; hard rock; glam punk; glam rock
- Length: 2:58
- Label: Johanna Kustannus
- Songwriter: Andy McCoy

Hanoi Rocks singles chronology
"Desperados" (1981)	"Dead by X-Mas" (1981)	"Love's an Injection" (1982)

"Dead by X-Mas" is a song by the Finnish rock band Hanoi Rocks. The single was released prior to the band's 1982 album Oriental Beat but neither the A- or B-side were featured on an album until the band's third album, Self Destruction Blues.

The songs are well liked and were the biggest hits of Hanoi Rocks' early career. The B-side, "Nothing New", is not as well known as the A-side, "Dead by X-Mas". "Dead by X-Mas" has since been thought to be as a prediction of the death of drummer Razzle, who died in a car crash in December 1984. The chorus even has the lyrics "I'll be dead by X-mas now anyway". The lyrics tell a horror story which guitarist Andy McCoy said could happen.

A cover version was released by the Japanese Visual kei band The Piass as a bonus track on their first album, Ryouki Kousatsu Chissoku-Shi, in 1995. The song also played a role in an urban legend similar to that of Razzle's, since the vocalist and drummer, Chihiro and Hiroshi, died while filming a music video later that year. English electronic music band Sohodolls also released a cover version of the song in 2007.

== Track listing ==
No.	Title	Writer(s)	Length
1.	"Dead by X-Mas"	Andy McCoy	2:58
2.	"Nothing New"	Andy McCoy	3:19

== Personnel ==
- Michael Monroe – lead vocals, piano, guitar
- Andy McCoy – lead guitar, vocals on "Nothing New"
- Nasty Suicide – rhythm guitar
- Sam Yaffa – bass
- Gyp Casino – drums
