= René Berg =

English musician & songwriter (1956–2003)

- Born: Ian Bruce; 24 February 1956
- Died: 28 July 2003 (aged 47) Kent, England
- Genres: Rock; Hard rock Glam rock Power pop
- Instruments: Guitar, Bass guitar
- Years active: 1977–2003
- Labels: Miles Ahead; Ammunition; Communique Records
- Formerly of: Idle Flowers; Soho Vultures; René Berg Band; Hanoi Rocks; Hollywood Killers; Herman Brood

René Berg, born Ian Bruce, (24 February 1956–28 July 2003) was an English musician, vocalist, guitarist, and songwriter, who recorded and performed in a number of bands in the late 1970s until his death in 2003. His bands included Idle Flowers, Soho Vultures, René Berg Band, along with appearances in Hanoi Rocks, Herman Brood Band, and Jim Penfold's The Killers (1986) (previously known as The Hollywood Killers).

== Biography ==
=== 1956–1985 ===
René was born Ian Alistair Bruce in 1956, the oldest child of a GP. He grew up in Wanstead, East London, and at the age of eight went to King's College Choir School in Cambridge as a boarder. When he was 13 the family moved to Eastry, Kent, and Ian transferred to day school and took up fishing, which his sister Fiona says he was completely passionate about. At about the same time he bought his first guitar with Green Shield Stamps, and taught himself to play in the basement of the Eastry house, which soon became a regular jam session venue. He went to school after spending three years at a catering college.

In 1979, he toured the Netherlands with Soho, a band formed by Tim Smit (now director of the Eden Project). The band also featured Sev Lewkowicz (later to play with Mungo Jerry and Dennis Locorriere) on keyboards.

In 1981, after a stint in Amsterdam with Herman Brood's Wild Romance (initially on guitar, but also on lead vocals after Brood was jailed for dealing LSD), René, as he was by then known, returned to the UK and formed Idle Flowers in September 1981. The band opened up for Hanoi Rocks on 20 January 1983 at the Klub Foot (at the Hammersmith Clarendon) and René also guested on guitar with Hanoi Rocks sometime in that year and joined Hanoi Rocks on stage at Birmingham Mermaid on 27 May for the encore. The Idle Flowers recorded many demos for an intended debut LP entitled The Leather, The Loneliness and Your Dark Eyes (which became the title of René's 1992 solo album) but the recordings remain unreleased. The only official Idle Flowers release was "All I Want Is You" / "Fizz Music" in 1984 on the Miles Ahead label recorded at the Abbey Road Studios.

=== 1985 ===
In March 1985, Berg was asked by Michael Monroe and Nasty Suicide to join Hanoi Rocks as the band's new bassist (Sami Yaffa having left the band). Berg was an old friend of the band and had played occasionally with Andy McCoy. The new Hanoi Rocks line-up (which also included one time Clash drummer Terry Chimes filling in after Razzle's death) only lasted a few months before falling apart. However Berg did record bass on the Rock & Roll Divorce (1985) live album and the final Hanoi Rocks 1985 demos. His self-penned song "Fast Car" included on his 1992 solo album, as well as Hanoi Rocks posthumous Lean on Me (1992). The rest of the 1985 demos remain unreleased.

On 30 July 1985, while at a party on board HMS Belfast celebrating the release of The Pogues album Rum Sodomy & The Lash, Berg heroically rescued Richard Fenn (a sub-editor for the Melody Maker) from drowning in the Thames after Fenn leaped overboard.

=== 1986–1990 ===
Shortly after the demise of Hanoi Rocks in May 1985, a month later the Idle Flowers broke up in June 1985 after almost a four-year stint together. Berg kept a low profile before ending up singing lead vocals in 1986 on the Suicide Twins' (Andy McCoy and Nasty Suicide's side acoustic band) Sweet Pretending.

In 1986, Berg grouped with Jim Penfold from The Hollywood Killers and started The Killers who recorded four unreleased demos, appeared on London Weekend TV, and did many shows before disbanding in early 1987. Also in 1987, he played on the Gang Bang Band's 12" EP recorded with Nasty Suicide from Hanoi Rocks, Bernie Tormé, Dumpy Dunnell and members of the Quireboys, Babysitters and Wolfsbane.

1987 proved a very productive year for Berg who fronted his second band (after the Idle Flowers) called West End Central which quickly evolved into the Soho Vultures with Nasty Suicide (Hanoi Rocks) on guitar. Tommy Fox soon replaced Dougie (Idle Flowers) on bass and the Soho Vultures recorded six songs in 1987 that to this day remain unreleased.

The Soho Vultures songs recorded were "Head Over Heels", "Can't Get To Sleep", "The Leather", "The Loneliness and Your Dark Eyes", "Happy", "Too Late" and "London Town". "Too Late" featured Nasty Suicide on lead vocals while the other songs featured Berg's vocals. "The Leather", "The Loneliness and Your Dark Eyes", "Happy" and "Too Late" were to be re-recorded for the band's debut single on Ammunition Records that never came to be. "Head Over Heels", "Can't Get To Sleep", "The Leather" and "The Loneliness and Your Dark Eyes", were all recorded for René's 1992 solo album.

Other Soho Vultures tracks played live included the old Idle Flowers songs "Down The Avenue", "Feel Your Love", "Glad I'm Not American", "Rob The Bank", "The Letter" and "Alright Alright" as well as a cover of Hanoi Rocks "Boiler". The Soho Vultures played frequently in London at the Marquee and Dingwalls, toured Finland in September of that year appearing on radio shows, a Finnish TV music programme entitled Rock Stop, and made a rarely seen video for the song "Head Over Heels", before calling it a day in late 1987.

=== 1991–2003 ===
After the Soho Vultures disbanded, Berg remained quiet for a few years until he scored a bigger record deal and recorded his only solo album The Leather, The Loneliness and Your Dark Eyes released in 1992 on Communique Records. When he arrived back on the scene he was revitalised by the album release, (his first in eight years since the Idle Flowers single) and promoted and played many live dates between 1992 and 1993 some with his old bandmate Nasty Suicide guesting on guitar. The album featured guitarist Bernie Tormé, bassist Paul Gray and Rat Scabies on drums. A planned tour of Europe and Japan to promote the album was scheduled but was later cancelled. In 1993 Berg contributed to Nasty Suicide's Cool Talk Injection (1994) album singing lead vocals on the Alvin Gibbs-penned song "The Trap That Venus Laid" and backing vocals on two other songs.

Berg died on 28 July 2003 estranged from those who knew him.

One of his proudest moments was appearing onstage in New York City, playing with Chuck Berry. The Darkness' 2003 hit "I Believe in a Thing Called Love" is close in arrangement to Berg's "Rob The Bank".

== Discography ==
=== Idle Flowers ===
- All I Want Is You b/w Fizz Music Single 7" (Mile Ahead Records, 1984)
- Studio Demos (Unreleased, 1981–1984)

Songs

- London Town
- Happy
- The Letter (Smash on lead vocals)
- Down The Avenue
- Feel Your Love
- Glad I'm Not American
- Lorraine
- Pleasures
- Girl on the Bus

=== West End Central ===
- Live Recordings

8/4/87, London, Dingwall's (Unreleased).

16 June 1987, London Marquee Club (Unreleased),

=== Soho Vultures ===
- Studio Demos (Unreleased, 1987)

Songs

- London Town
- Happy
- Too Late (Nasty Suicide and René Berg on lead vocals)
- Head Over Heels
- Can't Get To Sleep
- The Leather, The Loneliness And Your Dark Eyes
- Live Recordings

28 August 1987, Helsinki 007 Club, Finland (Unreleased)

7/10/1987, London, Dingwall's (Unreleased)

Songs

- Alright Alright (Exclusive to these live recordings)

=== René Berg Band ===
- The Leather, The Loneliness and Your Dark Eyes Album CD (Communique Records, 1992)

Songs

- Secrets
- Head Over Heels
- Can't Get To Sleep
- If I Had Wings
- Get Up Get Out
- Just Wanted To Dance With You
- Fast Car
- Ideal Woman
- Rob The Bank
- The Leather, The Loneliness And Your Dark Eyes
- Live Recordings
  - 30 May 1992, London, Marquee Club (Unreleased)
  - 22 May 1993, London, The Sir George Robey (Unreleased)
  - 14 November 1993, London, Underworld (Unreleased)

Songs

- Everybody Gets The Blues (exclusive to these live recordings)

Band feat. Timo Kaltio, Les Darell, Nasty Suicide

=== René Berg appearances ===
Herman Brood Band

- appears on guitar

Hanoi Rocks

- Rock & Roll Divorce live album LP (Lick Records, 1985)
- Lean on Me Album LP/CD (Lick Records, 1992) (Recorded 1985)
- Studio demos (Unreleased, 1985)
- appears on bass

"songs"

- Party
- Running back to your Lover
- Lips of Love
- Playing with myself

Suicide Twins

- Silver Missiles And Nightingales Album LP/CD (Yahoo Records, 1986)
- appears on additional lead vocals on "Sweet Pretending"

The Killers aka Jim Penfold & The Hollywood Killers

- Studio Demos (Unreleased, 1986)

Songs

- Cry
- Shatter The Heart
- Cactus Tongues
- Lonely
- appears on guitar and vocals

Gangbang Band

- S/T EP 12" (1987)
- appears on bass and vocals

Cheap And Nasty

- Cool Talk Injection Album LP/CD (Pony Canyon International, 1994)
- appears on lead vocals on "The Trap That Venus Laid" and backing vocals on "Healing Touch" and "End of Time".

== Band members ==
Idle Flowers (1981–1985)

- René Berg – Lead Vocals / Guitars
- Smash – Drums
- Froze – Bass
- Dougie – Bass
- Will Power (Jim Hyatt) – Drums
- Anthony Thistlethwaite (Nikki Sudden solo & The Waterboys) – Saxophone (on "All I Want Is You" 1984 Single only)

West End Central (1987)

- René Berg – Lead Vocals / Guitars
- Nasty Suicide (Hanoi Rocks) – Guitars / Vocals
- Smash – Drums
- Dave Tregunna (Sham 69, Lords of the New Church) – Bass
- Dougie – Bass
- Tommy Fox – Bass

Soho Vultures (1987)

- René Berg – Lead Vocals / Guitars
- Nasty Suicide (Hanoi Rocks) – Guitars / Vocals
- Smash – Drums
- Tommy Fox – Bass

René Berg Band (1992–1993)

Studio line up

- René Berg – Lead Vocals / Guitars
- Bernie Torme (Ozzy Osbourne Band, GILLAN, Torme, Electric Gypsies, Desperado) – Guitars
- Rat Scabies (Damned) – Drums
- Paul Gray (Eddie and the Hot Rods, Damned, U.F.O.) – Bass

Live line up (1993)

- René Berg – Lead vocals / guitar
- Darrel Bath (U.K. Subs, Crybabys, Dogs D'Amour) – Guitar / backing vocals
- Les Riggs – Drums / Backing vocals (Cheap and Nasty)
- Timo Kaltio – Guitar (Cheap and Nasty)
- Danny Garcia – Bass / backing vocals (The Crybabys)
