= Bebe Buell =

American model and singer

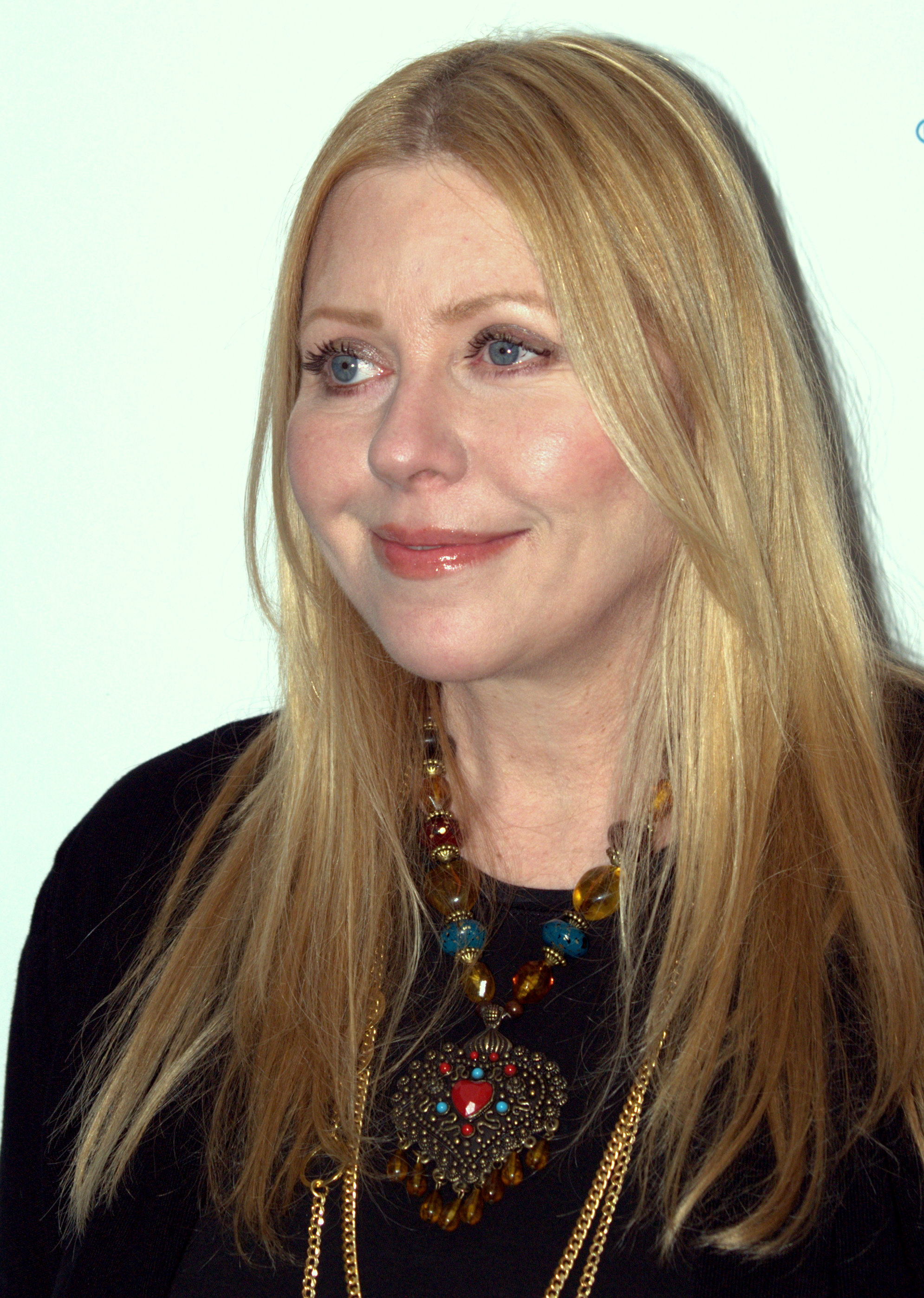
- Buell at the 2009 Tribeca Film Festival
- Born: Beverle Lorence Buell; July 14, 1953 (age 73); Portsmouth, Virginia, U.S.
- Occupations: Model, singer
- Spouses: Coyote Shivers (m. 1992; div. 1999) Jim Wallerstein (m. 2002)
- Children: Liv Tyler

Playboy centerfold appearance
- November 1974
- Preceded by: Ester Cordet
- Succeeded by: Janice Raymond

Personal details
- Height: 5 ft 9 in (1.75 m)

Beverle Lorence "Bebe" Buell (/ˈbiːbi ˈbjuːl/ BEE-bee BEWL; born July 14, 1953) is an American singer and former model. She was Playboy magazine's November 1974 Playmate of the Month. Buell moved to New York in 1972 after signing a modeling contract with Eileen Ford, and garnered notability after her publicized relationship with musician Todd Rundgren from 1972 until 1978, as well as her liaisons with several rock musicians during that time and over the following four decades. She is the mother of actress Liv Tyler (born 1977), whose biological father is Aerosmith frontman Steven Tyler. Todd Rundgren is Liv's legal father, as he signed the birth certificate.

In 2001 Buell published her autobiography with St. Martin's Press (with Victor Bockris), Rebel Heart: An American Rock and Roll Journey. The book was a New York Times bestseller. The paperback was issued in 2002.

== Early life ==
Buell was born in Portsmouth, Virginia, the daughter of Dorothea (Brown) Johnson, who founded the Protocol School of Washington, and Harold Lloyd Buell, a U.S. Navy officer and World War II veteran. As her father was not at home at the time of Buell's birth, her mother waited until he got back before naming her daughter. The nurses in the hospital took to calling her "Baby Buell," which is where her nickname of "Bebe" originated. She is of German descent.

== Career ==
=== Modeling ===
Buell was discovered by modeling agency executive Eileen Ford after high school graduation at age 17, and relocated to New York City at age 18. She was Playboy magazine's Playmate of the Month for the November 1974 issue; her centerfold was photographed by Richard Fegley. Describing her early years and modeling career, Buell said, "[I wanted] to be a professional singer [which was why] I came to New York—yes, I was a pretty young girl, so I fell into the modeling thing, and [then] I did Playboy, so then the rock stars came a-hunting, as I like to say."

=== Music ===
In 1981 Buell recorded a four-song EP on Rhino Records, produced by Rick Derringer and Ric Ocasek, with the Cars serving as her band on two tracks. The rock band the Power Station began in 1984 when her then-boyfriend John Taylor (of Duran Duran fame) pulled some famous friends together to provide backing for another of Buell's musical efforts. She also formed the band the B-Sides in 1980; it disbanded in 1985.

In 1985 Buell started another band, the Gargoyles, and released a couple of singles. A few large record companies showed interest, but the Gargoyles disbanded when Liv Tyler's paternity became public in 1991. Buell withdrew from performing for six years in the 1990s. She managed Liv's career as an international model and actress. She also represented actress Charis Michelsen.

After Liv left home in 1997, Buell recorded a solo effort with producer Don Fleming, released in 2000. She also performed around New York with the Bebe Buell Band and later with Boston musicians The Rudds and the Neighborhoods' drummer Johnny Lynch, forming a new band for a few shows that also included her husband, James Wallerstein.

In May 2009 Buell released her first recording in ten years, the single "Air Kisses for the Masses". She then recorded a 12-song album that can be downloaded on iTunes or Amazon MP3. Buell played a series of live shows in the New York City area to promote the single.

In September 2011 Buell released Hard Love, an aggressive rock album influenced by grunge and glam rock. It was produced by Wallerstein and Stephen DeAcutis. The 11-track record features original songs alongside covers of Gang of Four's "I Love a Man in Uniform" and "Baby Baby" by the English punk rock band the Vibrators.

== Personal life ==
Buell has dated many musicians, beginning with Paul Cowsill of the Cowsills when she was 15. She has dated Mick Jagger, Iggy Pop, David Bowie, Elvis Costello, Todd Rundgren, Jimmy Page, Duran Duran's John Taylor, and Steven Tyler among others, but she rejects the label "groupie".

From 1972 to 1978, Bebe Buell had a longterm, on and off, relationship with Todd Rundgren. In 1976, Buell became unexpectedly pregnant from a brief relationship with Steven Tyler. On July 1, 1977, Buell gave birth to future actress/model Liv Tyler, but Buell initially named her child Liv Rundgren and claimed that Todd Rundgren was the biological father to protect the child from Tyler's drug addiction. Rundgren and Buell ended their romantic relationship shortly after Liv's birth. At age 9, Liv found out that she was Steven Tyler's biological daughter.

In 1992, Buell married for the first time. She wed sometime-musician and actor Coyote Shivers. They divorced in 1999 after a year-long separation. In 2002, she married musician Jim Wallerstein (aka Jim Walters) of Das Damen.

For his film Almost Famous, music journalist and filmmaker Cameron Crowe developed the "band-aid" character Penny Lane as a composite of a handful of girls he saw backstage in the late 1960s and early 1970s at concerts calling themselves the "Flying Garter Girls". One girl who went by the nickname Penny Lane is real-life Pennie Lane Trumbull, born in Portland, Oregon, in 1954. Though they were not in the Flying Garter Girls group, various other women have been described as Crowe's inspiration, for instance Pamela Des Barres and Buell. Buell partially inspired Crowe; he named a lead singer character Jeff Bebe.

Buell lived in New York and New Jersey before relocating to Nashville, Tennessee, in 2013.

== Discography ==
Solo

- Covers Girl (1981), 12" 4 song EP produced by Ric Ocasek & Rick Derringer
1. "My Little Red Book"
2. "Wild One Forever"
3. "The Little Black Egg"
4. "Funtime"
- Little Black Egg (1982), 7" Single/UK for Moonlight Records
- Retrosexual, (1994, reissued 2004) for Sky Dog Records France
- Free To Rock (2000) produced by Don Fleming with the Bebe Buell Band
- "Air Kisses For The Masses" (2009) single iTunes, Amazon MP3, produced by Twinomatick
- Sugar (2009)
- "Hard Love (2011), 11-track album produced by James Wallerstein and Stephen DeAcutis.
1. "Mother of Rock'n'Roll"
2. "Devil You Know"
3. "Heartbeat"
4. "Got It All Wrong"
5. "Baby Baby"
6. "Black Angel"
7. "Sugar"
8. "I Love a Man in Uniform"
9. "Timeline"
10. "Normal Girl"
11. "I Will Wait"
- Baring It All: Greetings from Nashbury Park (2018)

with the B-Sides

- A Side of the B-Sides (1984), 3 song 12" EP Picture Disc produced by Todd Rundgren
1. "Mr. Never Forever"
2. "Windy Words"
3. "Battle Cry"

with the Gargoyles

Two 45 releases:

- "Gargoyle"/"Bored Baby" (1993), 7" Single/Cave Creek Records/Ultra Under
- "Jacuzzi Jungle"/"Thirteen Wrong Turns" (1987), 7" Single/Route One Records

Cassette EP, "Bebe Buell and the Gargoyles": "Vibrator"/"Lick it and Stick it"/"Take Me to Your Leader"/"Luv Reaction" (1988), FISHTRAKS

Nancy Cameron	Francine Parks	Pamela Zinszer	Marlene Morrow	Marilyn Lange	Sandy Johnson
Carol Vitale	Jean Manson	Kristine Hanson	Ester Cordet	Bebe Buell	Janice Raymond
