= Fallen Angels (Fallen Angels album) =

Studio album by Fallen Angels
- Released: 1984
- Recorded: November–December 1983
- Studio: Alaska Studios, Waterloo, London
- Label: Fall Out Records
- Producer: Knox, Iain O'Higgins

Fallen Angels chronology
| Fallen Angels (1984) | In Loving Memory (1986) |

Fallen Angels is a 1984 punk album by the band Fallen Angels, a project of Knox of The Vibrators and members of Hanoi Rocks; Nasty Suicide, Sam Yaffa, Razzle, Mike Monroe, Andy McCoy. At the time Knox and the Hanoi Rocks shared the same manager.

== Issues ==
The original LP was issued in UK (Fall LP 23), Sweden (Sword SWA 001), Canada (Quality SV-2133) and Japan (SMS Sounds Marketing System SP25-5120) in 1984. The record was re-released on CD in 1990 in Japan (Mercury PHCR-1011), the US (Deadline CLP 0501-2), Sweden (Raw Power RP-005). The CD was reissued by Fallout in the UK in 2006.

== Track listing ==
All tracks composed by Ian M. Carnochan

1. "Inner Planet Love"
2. "Precious Heart"
3. "Partners in Crime"
4. "Housten Tower"
5. "Amphetamine Blue"
6. "He's a Rebel"
7. "Black & White World"
8. "Rain, Rain, Rain"
9. "Falling"
10. "Runaround"
11. "Cuckoo Land"
12. "Kiss It Goodbye"
13. "New Society"
14. "Straight City"
15. "Vipers in the Dark"

== Personnel ==
Fallen Angels

- Knox – lead vocals, lead guitar, keyboards, cover painting
- Nasty Suicide – rhythm guitar
- Sam Yaffa – bass guitar, backing vocals
- Razzle – drums, backing vocals

with:

- Richard Wernham – additional keyboards, percussion
- The Cosmic Ted – additional guitar
- The Flashing Psychedelic Kid – saxophone
- Greg Von Cook – arrangement on "Vipers in the Dark"
