= Bangkok Shocks, Saigon Shakes, Hanoi Rocks =

Studio album by Hanoi Rocks
- Released: 26 February 1981
- Recorded: January 1981
- Studio: Park Studio, Stockholm, Sweden
- Genre: Glam punk; glam metal
- Length: 36:34
- Label: Johanna Kustannus
- Producer: "The Muddy Twins" (Andy McCoy & Michael Monroe)

Hanoi Rocks chronology
Bangkok Shocks, Saigon Shakes, Hanoi Rocks (1981)	Oriental Beat (1982)

Singles from Bangkok Shocks, Saigon Shakes, Hanoi Rocks
- 1. "Tragedy" Released: February 1981 (Finland, Sweden), April 1982 (Japan)

Professional ratings
Review scores
Source	Rating
AllMusic	4/5 stars
Record Collector	4/5 stars

Bangkok Shocks, Saigon Shakes, Hanoi Rocks is the debut studio album by the Finnish rock band Hanoi Rocks, released in 1981.

Bangkok Shocks, Saigon Shakes, Hanoi Rocks was recorded in January 1981, between Hanoi Rocks' club shows. While the album was produced by Andy McCoy and Michael Monroe under the name "The Muddy Twins" (inspired by "The Glimmer Twins"), the album was recorded by Swedish Seppo Johansson, who worked at the studio. While the album received positive reviews, Andy McCoy later complained that Johansson had ruined many of the songs. Michael Monroe lamented that he could not listen to his own vocals, which he considered underdeveloped.

The album was originally going to be titled Some Like It Hot or Some Like It Cut, but Jim Pembroke suggested the name Bangkok Shocks, Saigon Shakes, Hanoi Rocks, which the band ultimately chose.

The biggest hit of the album was "Tragedy". "Walking With My Angel" is a cover of a song from 1961 by Bobby Vee. "Don't Never Leave Me" was re-recorded and released as "Don't You Ever Leave Me" on Hanoi Rocks' fifth album Two Steps from the Move.

== Track listing ==
All tracks are written by Andy McCoy, except "Walking with My Angel" written by Gerry Goffin and Carole King.

No.	Title	Length
1.	"Tragedy"	3:54
2.	"Village Girl"	3:10
3.	"Stop Cryin'"	3:38
4.	"Don't Never Leave Me"	3:55
5.	"Lost in the City"	3:45
6.	"First Timer"	2:54
7.	"Cheyenne"	3:21
8.	"11th Street Kids"	3:45
9.	"Walking with My Angel"	2:10
10.	"Pretender"	3:30

2013 Japanese remastered edition
No.	Title	Length
11.	"Cafe Avenue" (original version)	4:55
12.	"Rebel On The Run"	2:49
13.	"I Love You" (demo)	2:07

== Personnel ==
Personnel taken from Bangkok Shocks, Saigon Shakes, Hanoi Rocks liner notes.

Hanoi Rocks

- Michael Monroe – lead and backing vocals, piano, saxophone, harmonica
- Andy McCoy – guitars, 12-string guitar, slide guitar, backing vocals, lead vocals on the intro of "Cheyenne"
- Nasty Suicide – guitars, 12-string guitar, backing vocals
- Sam Yaffa – bass
- Gyp Casino – drums

Additional musicians

- Anna McCoy – handclaps
- John Galaxy Groves – synth

== Charts ==
Chart (1981)	Peak position
Finnish Albums (The Official Finnish Charts)	14
