= Warheads =

Warheads may refer to:

- Warhead, an explosive device used in military conflicts
- Warheads (band), a Swedish band
- Warheads (candy), a brand of sour candy
- Warheads (comics), a comic book published by Marvel UK
- "Warheads" (song), a song by Extreme from the album III Sides to Every Story

== See also ==
- Warhead (disambiguation)
