= Pure Mania =

Studio album by The Vibrators
- Released: June 1977
- Genre: Punk, new wave
- Length: 34:42
- Label: Epic; Columbia
- Producer: Robin Mayhew, The Vibrators

The Vibrators chronology
Pure Mania (1977)	V2 (1978)

Pure Mania is the debut album by the punk band the Vibrators. It was released in 1977 on Epic Records and reached No. 49 in the UK Albums Chart. The song "Baby Baby" was released as a single and punk band Stiff Little Fingers got their name from the song of the same name from this album.

== Reception ==
Professional ratings
Review scores
Source	Rating
AllMusic	4.5/5 stars
Christgau's Record Guide	A
The Rolling Stone Album Guide	4/5 stars

In the 1992 Rolling Stone Album Guide, Mark Coleman wrote that Pure Mania was among "the few original punk artifacts that still sound urgent—and necessary." Trouser Press called it "a treasure trove of memorable ditties". AllMusic's Mark Deming said the album "isn't purist's punk, but it's pure rock & roll, and there's nothing wrong with that." Village Voice critic Robert Christgau described it as "good new-fashioned rock and roll at its wildest".

== Track listing ==
All songs by I.M. Carnochan except as indicated.

=== Side one ===
1. "Into the Future..."
2. "Yeah Yeah Yeah" (Pat Collier)
3. "Sweet Sweet Heart"
4. "Keep It Clean" (John Ellis)
5. "Baby Baby"
6. "No Heart"
7. "She's Bringing You Down"

=== Side two ===
1. "Petrol" (Pat Collier)
2. "London Girls"
3. "You Broke My Heart"
4. "Whips & Furs"
5. "Stiff Little Fingers" (John Ellis)
6. "Wrecked on You"
7. "I Need a Slave"
8. "Bad Time"

== Personnel ==
The Vibrators

- Knox – guitar, keyboards, vocals
- John Ellis – guitar, vocals
- Pat Collier – bass, vocals
- John "Eddie" Edwards – drums

Technical

- Simon Humphrey – engineering
- Steve Cunningham – engineering
- Keith Morris – photography
