= Charis Michelsen =

American actress

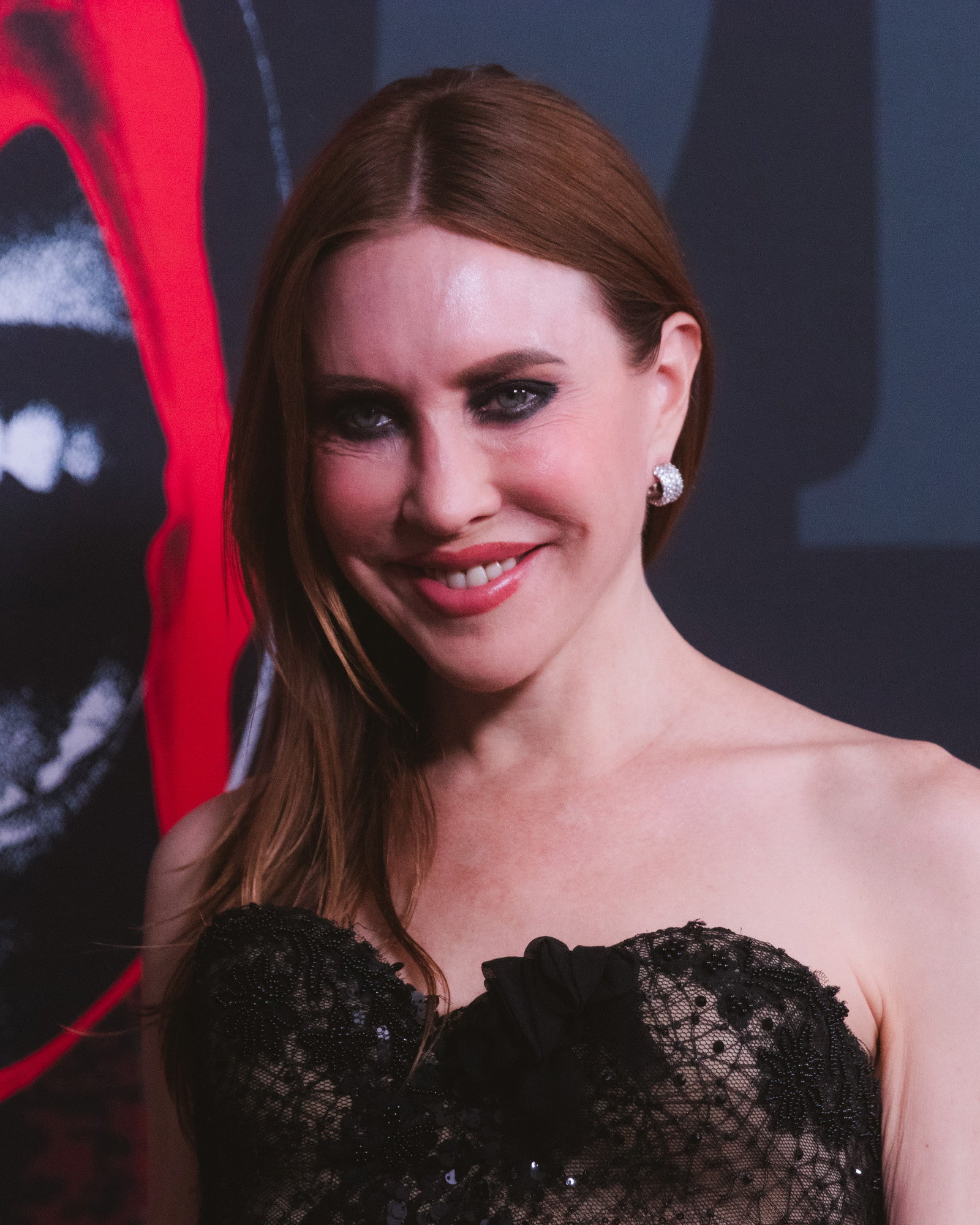
- Michelsen in 2026
- Education: Parsons School of Design
- Occupations: Actress; model; make-up artist; writer; producer; inventor
- Years active: 1996–present
- Spouse: Josh Evans (m. 2003; div. 2011)

Charis Michelsen (/ʃærʌs/) is an American actress, writer, producer, inventor, former model and make-up artist. Michelsen worked as a model in New York City in her early adulthood before becoming an actress. She appeared in supporting roles in the films High Art (1998), Martin Scorsese's Bringing Out the Dead (1999), and Wonder Boys (2000).

Michelsen invented the first Universal Beauty Standard System which was used to create an artificial intelligence personal stylist.

== Early life ==
Charis (pronounced Chær-us) Michelsen was raised in Boring, Oregon, a small town east of Portland. After graduating from Centennial High School in Gresham, she placed first in a modeling pageant, representing the northwestern United States.

== Career ==
Michelsen subsequently relocated to New York City to study art at Parsons School of Design, where a photographer for Harper's Bazaar discovered her for modeling. While attending a rock concert, Michelsen was discovered by Liv Tyler's mother Bebe Buell, who became her manager.

In 1997, Michelsen was the voice for the co-starring role of Keri Boyer in I Married a Strange Person!, directed and animated by Bill Plympton.

Michelsen played the role of Debby in Lisa Cholodenko's 1998 independent drama film High Art, followed by supporting parts in Martin Scorsese's film Bringing Out the Dead (1999) and the independent drama Men in Scoring Position (also 1999). The following year, she had a supporting role in the comedy-drama film Wonder Boys (2000), directed by Curtis Hanson and starring Michael Douglas, Tobey Maguire, and Frances McDormand.

She subsequently starred in the independent films The Price of Air (2000) and Orphan (2001).

Michelsen played Mrs. Wyatt Cooper (Eric Dane's wife) on an episode of the ABC television drama Gideon's Crossing. She also starred with Peter Steele in his band Type O Negative's music video "My Girlfriend's Girlfriend," and with Liv Tyler in the music video "If" by Coyote Shivers.

== Personal life ==
She was married to actor and director Josh Evans from 2003 to 2011, and is the former daughter-in-law of the late movie producer Robert Evans and actress Ali MacGraw.

== Filmography ==
=== Film ===
Year	Title	Role	Notes	Ref.
1996	The Fountain of Death	Alison		
1996	Tromeo and Juliet	Person of the Female Persuasion with Very Good Hearing		
1997	I Married a Strange Person!	Keri Boyer	Voice role	
1998	The Last Lie	Faith March		
1998	High Art	Debby		
1998	Perfect Lies	Faith		
1999	Bringing Out the Dead	I.B.'s Girlfriend		
1999	Men in Scoring Position	Lucy Michaels		
1999	Every Messiah Is a Liar	Ruby Fox		
1999	Dead Man's Tango	Zia		
2000	Wonder Boys	Carrie		
2000	The Price of Air	Anne		
2001	Orphan	Anna		
2001	Gideon's Crossing	Mrs. Wyatt Cooper	Episode: "A Routine Case"	
2001	Home Sweet Hoboken	Twyla		
2001	Eight	Edie	Short film	
2003	Piggie	Robin		
2005	Erosion	Irene		
2005	Che Guevara	American Reporter		
2009	Everybody Dies	Nina Conrad		
2011	Grace Paine: The Bombay Beach Incident	Grace Paine	Short film	
2018	The Dare	Lead	Short film	

=== Music videos ===
Year	Song	Artist	Notes
1995	"Technova"	Towa Tei	
1996	"My Girlfriend's Girlfriend"	Type O Negative	
1996	"Neptune Avenue"	Sammy	
1997	"If"	Coyote Shivers	
2007	"Lie"	Black Light Burns	
