= V2 (album) =

Studio album by the Vibrators
- Released: April 1978
- Genres: Punk, new wave
- Length: 38:34
- Labels: Epic; Columbia
- Producer: Vic Maile

The Vibrators chronology
Pure Mania (1977)	V2 (1978)	Guilty (1982)

V2 is the second studio album by the punk band the Vibrators, released in 1978 on Epic Records. The album was dedicated to Wolf "Moishe" Moser.

== Reissues ==
Some of the songs from this album and the previous album Pure Mania were combined to form the American album Batteries Included, released by CBS Records in 1980. It was packaged together with Pure Mania by Track Records in 2002, and has recently been re-issued by Captain Oi! Records with bonus tracks "Judy Says (Knock You in the Head)" and "Pushing Too Hard".

== Reception ==
- "V2 shows the Vibrators taking the driving energy of punk and applying it to songs that have a subtle, pop-like quality; while it does not have the wonderfully brash and itchy cohesiveness of Pure Mania, it's a solid album well worth hearing." (David Cleary, AllMusic)
- "V2 is a letdown, the energy dissipated with nothing but the cheap thrills of secondhand kinkiness to compensate." (Dave Marsh, The New Rolling Stone Record Guide)
- "While some of the material is not that different from the debut LP, V2 is pretentious and overblown, following too many different cul-de-sacs to hang together." (Ira Robbins, Trouser Press)

Scottish punk rock band the Exploited covered the track "Troops of Tomorrow" and used it as the title track for their second album.

== Track listing ==
All songs written by Knox, except for where noted.

=== Side one ===
1. "Pure Mania" 3:00
2. "Automatic Lover" 3:04
3. "Flying Duck Theory" (John Ellis) 2:58
4. "Public Enemy No. 1" (Knox, Gary Tibbs) 2:07
5. "Destroy" (Knox, Tibbs) 2:16
6. "Nazi Baby" 4:19

=== Side two ===
1. "Wake Up" 1:57
2. "Sulphate" 1:43
3. "24 Hour People" 2:52
4. "Fall in Love" 4:31
5. "Feel Alright" 1:51
6. "War Zone" 2:17
7. "Troops of Tomorrow" 5:39

"Pure Mania" includes an extract from "Red House" by Jimi Hendrix, and begins with the original sound of the German WWII flying-bomb, the V1 (the ‘V2', a ballistic missile, sound was never recorded) getting close, then the engine stops, some seconds of silence, then the explosion).

== Chart performance ==
It was their most successful album, reaching No. 33 in the UK Albums Chart. The single "Automatic Lover", taken from the album, was the only Vibrators’ single to reach the UK Top 40 where it reached No. 33. It earned the band a TV appearance on the prime-time TV show Top of the Pops.

== Personnel ==
The Vibrators

- Knox - guitar, piano, vocals
- John Ellis - guitar, synthesizer, vocals, cover artwork
- Gary Tibbs - bass, vocals
- John "Eddie" Edwards - drums, vocals

with:

- Sisters of No Mercy - choir on "Sulphate"
- Berlin Symphonia - strings
- Nicky Graham - string arrangements
