= I Married a Strange Person! =

1997 American adult animated comedy film

- Promotional poster
- Directed by: Bill Plympton
- Written by: Bill Plympton; P.C. Vey
- Produced by: Bill Plympton
- Starring: Charis Michelsen; Tom Larson; Richard Spore
- Cinematography: John Donnelly
- Edited by: Anthony Arcidi
- Music by: Maureen McElheron
- Production company: Italtoons Corporation
- Distributed by: Lions Gate Films
- Release dates: September 8, 1997 (TIFF); August 28, 1998
- Running time: 73 minutes
- Country: United States
- Language: English
- Budget: $250,000
- Box office: $467,272

I Married a Strange Person! is a 1997 American adult animated romantic comedy film directed, produced, and co-written by Bill Plympton.

== Plot ==
As the film begins, a brown bird in flight becomes infatuated with a blue bird, and they begin mating in midair. After passing through a cloud they fall into a nosedive, eventually striking a satellite dish on top of a house belonging to Mr. Grant Boyer- Grant is then struck by a beam of mysterious energy. Soon afterward - and now married to a woman named Keri - a strange power begins to manifest itself in Grant which seems to wildly affect the state of reality, people and objects based on his whims, daydreams, and/or imagination. This frightens Keri while they try to have sex, and they both soon go to her parents' house to have dinner she discusses this problem with her mother. Her parents express they did disapprove of her marriage to Grant, and at dinner Grant's powers are inflicted upon Keri's mother through insects and her father through musical instrumentation while Grant initiates a dance with his confused wife.

A broadcasting company called Smilecorp is in desperate need of higher ratings. Led by a power-hungry man named Larson P. Giles, he proceeds to demonstrate his militant cruelty upon his television show pitchmen through the use of his underling Col. Ferguson. Back at Grant's home he witnesses his next-door neighbor Bud Sweeny cutting his lawn, and ends up anthropomorphizing a blade of grass - it attempts to eliminate Bud with his own mower, though he is saved when Grant transforms the mower into a large, friendly caterpillar. While Grant stands perplexed by what he both did and witnessed, Bud runs into his house to call the popular Jackie Jason Variety Show and inform them of Grant's amazing powers. Meanwhile, Keri Boyer lies crying and wondering about her husband, though when Grant tries to comfort her about the lasting nature of their love Keri becomes overweight with wrinkles temporarily and to her great terror. After making up, they proceed to have sex, but Keri grows increasingly frustrated with Grant's inability to control his wild powers, affecting her for the duration of the scene.

Grant later readies for an appearance on the Jackie Jason Show, sharing a dressing room with a once legendary yet now washed-up comic named Solly Jim; Grant confides to Solly that Keri may leave him due to his bizarre condition and the commotion it has caused. Solly goes on first but does quite badly with his act; it is then shown that a boil-like bump on the back of Grant's neck is the source of his chaotic abilities. After saving Solly's act the comedian gives Grant his business card and address, offering his future services in gratitude for his aid, though as Grant walks onto the set an attendant covers his boil with a bandage which prevents his powers from being used. After struggling for a time, the bandage falls off causing an immense amount of power to manifest from Grant which partially destroys the studio. This event both boosts the Jackie Jason Show's ratings greatly as well as catching the attention of Smilecorp and Larson P. Giles. Larson commands Col. Ferguson to bring Grant Boyer back to him alive, much to the Colonel's detriment.

Back at home Keri has shut herself away from him to think her life through. Meanwhile, Larson deduces through observation and x-rays of Grant the source of his powers, and Grant simultaneously discovers the beam of light - reflected by the bent satellite dish on top of his house and various other objects on his property - had created the boil on the back of his neck when the two birds struck it at the start of the film. At that moment Col. Fergsuon arrives with Smilecorp tanks and infantry to capture him, though Grant manages to elude the Smilecorp captors with both his powers and with the help of the friendly caterpillar from earlier. Ferguson meanwhile deals with his failure and the new reptilian transformation that Grant enacted upon him to aid in his escape.

While Keri goes home to her parents' house with Col. Ferguson in pursuit, Grant seeks refuge at Solly Jim's home to ask for help. However, Solly betrays him and informs the Colonel of his location, though at her parents' house Keri hears of her husband's plight and tricks the Colonel into revealing to her Grant's location. His soldiers pursue her, but she manages to escape in pursuit of helping Grant. Back at Smilecorp, Solly demands that Larson P. Giles reward him for capturing Grant, but he ends up in a stand off between Larson, Ferguson, and Smiles (a Smilecorp TV mascot). Solly tricks them all and gains the upper hand, removing Grant's boil with the intention of implanting it into his own neck to become the greatest comic alive. The boil seems to reject him, though, and splits him in half causing his death. Ferguson then takes the lobe for himself, implanting it into his neck to restore his human form and grant his body untold military power, but ends up killing himself. Finally Larson seeks to harness and control this power, though Keri tricks Larson disguised as a nurse and flees with both the boil and her husband.

Crashing out of a window with Grant in a wheelchair and under machinegun fire, Keri fashions a parachute in order to land safely while confessing her true feelings to him. When the parachute is damaged, the friendly caterpillar (now a butterfly) saves them from falling while dropping them safely into a red convertible. After Grant and Keri defeat several more Smilecorp forces, Larson unleashes a massive and powerful new tank to finish them off. Once again, though, the butterfly comes to Grant's aid and drops a crazed soldier on top of the tank's turret- this causes the tank to destroy the Smilecorp building (which in turn topples onto the tank, destroying it) which allows Grant and Keri to escape.

Just when all seems well, Larson and Smiley end up landing (from the explosion at Smilecorp) in Grant's car demanding the lobe once again at gunpoint. The car proceeds to crash, but Larson succeeds in retrieving the lobe from Keri, installing it into his neck. Larson's face then appears on every TV screen across the entire world, having gotten complete control of global communications. A complication arises though as Larson's head swells into a balloon, lifting both he and Smiley high into the air - just as the two love birds from earlier fly by and pierce Larson's swollen head, causing him to explode violently. After that, a dog walks by and consumes the boil from the ground; this grants it the ability to create massive bones from the sky for its enjoyment. Keri and Grant - now a rekindled Mr. and Mrs. Boyer - go home to have sex once again, but Keri, in the end, begins exhibiting signs that she may have gained some powers from Grant due to spending so much time with him when their house levitates.

== Cast ==
- Charis Michelsen as Keri Boyer (voice) (as Charis Michaelson)
- Tom Larson as Grant Boyer (voice)
- Richard Spore as Larson P. Giles (voice)
- Chris Cooke as Col. Ferguson (voice)
- Ruth Ray as Keri's Mom (voice)
- J.B. Adams as Keri's Dad (voice)
- John Russo Jr. as Bud Sweeny (voice)
- Jennifer Senko as Smiley
- John Holderried as Jackie Jason
- Etta Valeska as Sex Video Model (voice)
- Bill Martone as Announcer

== Release ==
I Married a Strange Person! was released on August 28, 1998 by Lions Gate Films, making it a first theatrical animated film to ever be distributed by the studio before Happily N'Ever After.

=== Home media ===
The film was released on VHS and DVD by Universal Studios Home Video on April 25, 2000.

== See also ==
- List of animated feature films
- Independent animation
- Arthouse animation
