= Baby Baby (The Vibrators song) =

Single by The Vibrators
- B-side: "Into the Future"
- Released: May 1977
- Genre: Punk rock
- Label: Epic Records

"Baby Baby" is a song originally recorded by English punk rock band The Vibrators.

== Recording and release ==
"Baby Baby" was written by Ian 'Knox' Carnochan, the Vibrators' primary songwriter. The song was recorded and released as a single in May 1977. It was their first single released on Epic Records, with their previous singles having been released on RAK. The song on the B-side was "Into the Future".

One month later, in June 1977, the song was included in the release of their debut album, Pure Mania. The song was included in a session for John Peel at Radio 1.

The song has since been featured on numerous 'best of punk' compilation albums, including Punk: The Early Years and Punk's Not Dead - 30 Years of Punk, as well as compilation albums containing only Vibrators tracks.

When Knox was interviewed for Punk77 in 1999 he said, "My favourite Vibrators' song has to be "Baby Baby". I always think when I play it is like being on holiday."

== Cover versions ==
The song has been covered by R.E.M., Forgotten Rebels, Die Toten Hosen, Soul Asylum, and others.
