= Warhead (disambiguation) =

A warhead is an explosive device used in military conflicts.

Warhead may also refer to:

== Film and television ==
- Warhead (film), a 1977 American film directed by John O'Connor
- Razer (robot) aka Warhead, a combat robot on the British television series Robot Wars
- "Warhead" (Star Trek: Voyager), a Star Trek: Voyager episode
- "Warhead" (Star Wars Rebels), an episode in the third season of the animated TV series Star Wars Rebels

== Music ==
- Warhead Records, a heavy metal record label in Sydney, Australia
- "Warhead", a song by electronic musician Krust
- "Warhead", a song by nu metal band Otep
- "Warhead", a song by heavy metal band Tarot
- "Warhead", a song by punk rock band U.K. Subs
- "Warhead", a song by black metal band Venom

== Science and technology ==
- Electrophilic and/or photoreactive warheads, reactive functional groups in probes used for activity-based proteomics
- Electrophilic warhead, the bond-forming functional group in targeted covalent inhibitors

== Other ==
- Warhead (video game), a 1989 3D space combat simulator for Amiga and Atari ST platforms
- "Warhead", a science fiction novel by Ricardo Delgado
- Cat's Cradle: Warhead, novel by Andrew Cartmel based on Doctor Who
- Crysis Warhead, a 2008 expansion pack for the video game Crysis

== See also ==
- Warheads (disambiguation)
