= Silver Missiles and Nightingales =

Studio album by The Suicide Twins
- Released: Spring, 1986
- Recorded: 1986
- Genre: Rock; Acoustic rock
- Label: Yahoo! Records
- Producer: Andy McCoy and Alan Scott

Professional ratings
Review scores
Source	Rating
AllMusic	3/5 stars
Kerrang!	4/5 stars

Silver Missiles and Nightingales is the first and only album by the collaboration between Andy McCoy and Nasty Suicide (under the moniker "The Suicide Twins"). The name of the album was originally supposed to be the title of Hanoi Rocks' (McCoy and Suicide's former band) 1984 album Two Steps From The Move, but the name was changed at the last minute.

When it was first released, Silver Missiles and Nightingales didn't fare well but the album's reception has since grown. The album is hailed as a great showcase of McCoy and Suicide's playing style and McCoy's writing talent. After the album's release, McCoy and Suicide (then known as Nasty Superstar) toured in Finland under the moniker "The Suicide Twins", until disbanding that same year (1986).

The song "The Best Is Yet to Come" was later covered by Samantha Fox.

== Track listing ==
All track written by Andy McCoy, except where noted.

1. "Dance" – 4:26
2. "Heaven Made You" – 4:25 (McCoy, Dave Tregunna)
3. "Declaration" – 4:28 (McCoy, Anita Chellamah)
4. "Mainline Service" – 2:17
5. "What a Price to Pay" – 3:59
6. "Silver Missiles and Nightingales" – 3:59
7. "Coming Down Slow" – 3:23
8. "The Best Is Yet to Come" – 3:39
9. "Sweet Pretending" – 3:44 (McCoy, Dave Tregunna)
10. "Countryfield Inner City Blues" – 4:17

== Personnel ==
- Andy McCoy – vocals, guitar
- Nasty Suicide (credited as Nasty Superstar) – vocals, guitar
- René Berg – vocals
- Ross Elder – drums

Additional musicians

- Patricia Morrison – bass on "Countryfield Inner City Blues"
