= Girl in 3D =

2005 film

- Directed by: Luis Aira
- Written by: Luis Aira
- Starring: Coyote Shivers; Bevin Tucker; Michael Aronin; Yareli Arizmendi
- Release date: 2005
- Running time: 93 minutes
- Country: United States
- Language: English

Girl in 3D is a 2005 American film directed by Luis Aira and starring Bevin Tucker, Coyote Shivers, Yareli Arizmendi and Jonathan Paley. It tells the story of a young woman who moves to Los Angeles to become a movie star, but instead gets exploited by powerful men in the entertainment industry. The film screened at the Dances with Films film festival in 2005, and won Best Feature at Indiefest Chicago, as well as Best Thriller and Best Actress (Bevin Tucker) at the 2004 New York International Independent Film and Video Festival in Los Angeles.

== Synopsis ==
Vicky (Bevin Tucker) is an ambitious young blonde living in Hollywood, aspiring to be a movie star. On the run from her violent boyfriend, she gets hired to be the "Toy" of her favorite rock star, Stu (Coyote Shivers), who is in desperate need of inspiration. Starry-eyed and reckless, Vicky enters a world of fantasy fueled by addiction and an abusive thirst for fame. Prey to the hidden agendas of those around him, Stu's fantasy world meets harsh reality in a head-on collision that forces him to connect with Vicky. The record company needs a hit but Stu can't find the magic. Fate brought them together but will the music break them apart?

== Reception and release ==
Robert Koehler of Variety wrote, "That old cynical showbiz standby of delivering a cautionary fable about exploitation in a nakedly exploiter package is pushed to a place where it’s no longer fun," and predicted that the film's "latex-coated sleaziness will ensure cable deals galore."

The DVD was originally released in America but was discontinued. It is currently available in the UK.
