= Underwater World (song) =

Single by Hanoi Rocks

from the album Two Steps From The Move
- B-side: "Shakes", "Magic Carpet Ride" and "Oil And Gasoline"
- Released: August 1984 (Finland), November 1984 (UK)
- Recorded: 20 January – 24 March 1984
- Genre: hard rock; glam punk; glam rock
- Length: 5:17
- Label: CBS, AAB
- Songwriters: Andy McCoy, Ian Hunter
- Producer: Bob Ezrin

Hanoi Rocks singles chronology
"Up Around the Bend" (1984)	"Underwater World" (1984)	"Don't You Ever Leave Me" (1984)

"Underwater World" is single released in 1984 by the Finnish rock and glam punk band Hanoi Rocks. "Underwater World" is from the band's US-breakthrough album Two Steps From The Move, and was released as a single and as an EP in August 1984 in Finland and in November in the UK.

"Underwater World" was chosen as the "Single of the Week" in the September 8, 1984 issue of the UK's Sounds magazine, ahead of songs like "Pride (In the Name of Love)" by U2, Heaven's on Fire by Kiss and Smooth Operator by Sade.

The song was recorded with the rest of the album at the Record Plant in New York City and finished at the Phase One studio in Toronto, Ontario. The band's guitarist and primary songwriter Andy McCoy described the song in August 1984 in the Finnish music magazine Soundi: "What could I say about it? It's a cool song, it swings. I don't want to say anything about the lyrics. You can make your own conclusions." Later the band Guns N' Roses took the title of their hit song, "Welcome to the Jungle" from "Underwater World's" chorus where Michael Monroe sings: "Welcome to the ocean. Welcome to the sea. Welcome to the jungle. Deep inside of me.".

The song "Shakes" was recorded in the same sessions as the whole Two Steps From The Move album and was produced by the album's producer Bob Ezrin. The song was still left off the album, but it was featured on multiple compilations. "Magic Carpet Ride" was also left out of the album but was included on the remastered CD-version and on a Finnish compilation. "Oil And Gasoline" was produced by McCoy, Monroe and Gregg Kofi Brown (Osibisa), who was also the second producer on "Magic Carpet Ride". Brown also played bass on "Oil And Gasoline". Monroe, McCoy and Brown were the only ones playing on "Oil And Gasoline".

== Track listing ==
7" single
No.	Title	Writer(s)	Length
1.	"Underwater World"	Andy McCoy	5:17
2.	"Shakes"	Andy McCoy	3:24

12" single
No.	Title	Writer(s)	Length
1.	"Underwater World"	Andy McCoy	5:17
2.	"Shakes"	Andy McCoy	3:24
3.	"Magic Carpet Ride"	Andy McCoy, Michael Monroe	4:30

EP
No.	Title	Writer(s)	Length
1.	"Underwater World"	Andy McCoy	5:17
2.	"Oil & Gasoline"	Andy McCoy, Gregg Brown	4:05
3.	"Shakes"	Andy McCoy	3:24
4.	"Magic Carpet Ride"	Andy McCoy, Michael Monroe	4:30

== Personnel ==
- Michael Monroe - Lead vocals, saxophone
- Andy McCoy - Lead guitar, backing vocals
- Nasty Suicide - Rhythm guitar
- Sam Yaffa - Bass
- Razzle - Drums
- Gregg Kofi Brown - Bass on "Oil And Gasoline"
