= Street Poetry =

2007 studio album by Hanoi Rocks

Studio album by Hanoi Rocks
- Released: 5 September 2007
- Recorded: Spring 2007
- Genre: Glam punk; hard rock
- Label: Backstage Alliance
- Producer: Hanoi Productions

Hanoi Rocks chronology
Another Hostile Takeover (2005)	Street Poetry (2007)	This One's for Rock'n'roll – The Best of Hanoi Rocks 1980–2008 (2008)

Singles from Street Poetry
- 1. "Fashion" Released: 16 May 2007; 2. "This One's for Rock'n'Roll" Released: 8 August 2007; 3. "Teenage Revolution" Released: 2008

Professional ratings
Review scores
Source	Rating
AllMusic	3.5/5 stars
Hard Rock Hide Out	9/10 stars
Plaza.fi	4/5 stars
Soundi	3/5 stars

Street Poetry is the Finnish rock band Hanoi Rocks's eighth and final studio album. The album reached the top 10 on the Finnish charts, and succeeded very well elsewhere in Europe too. The first single spawned was "Fashion", and the second was an internet-only single "This One's for Rock'n'Roll". The album's release was celebrated at the Tavastia Club with three live shows, which were followed by a tour across Scandinavia, England and Japan.

The album's title comes from a time when the original Hanoi Rocks were living in London. A drifter was living in the London Underground Ladbroke Grove-station, where he wrote poems of things he saw. He was called a "Street Poet", and hence the title "Street Poetry".

Some reviews said that the album was Hanoi Rocks' first real rock record since the 1980s.

== Track list ==
No.	Title	Writer(s)	Length
1.	"Hypermobile"	Andy McCoy, Michael Monroe, Conny Bloom	4:05
2.	"Street Poetry"	Andy McCoy, Michael Monroe	3:57
3.	"Fashion"	Andy McCoy, Michael Monroe	3:16
4.	"Highwired"	Andy McCoy, Michael Monroe	3:28
5.	"Power of Persuasion"	Andy McCoy, Michael Monroe, Conny Bloom	4:16
6.	"Teenage Revolution"	Andy McCoy, Michael Monroe	3:36
7.	"Worth Your Weight in Gold"	Andy McCoy, Michael Monroe	3:33
8.	"Transcendental Groove"	Andy McCoy, Michael Monroe	3:03
9.	"This One's for Rock'n'Roll"	Andy McCoy, Michael Monroe	3:44
10.	"Powertrip"	Andy McCoy, Michael Monroe, Conny Bloom	2:38
11.	"Walkin' Away"	Andy McCoy, Michael Monroe, Conny Bloom, DJ Alimo	3:56
12.	"Tootin' Star"	Andy McCoy, Michael Monroe, Conny Bloom, Andy Christell	2:40
13.	"Fumblefoot and Busy Bee"	Andy McCoy, Conny Bloom	2:04

Limited edition
No.	Title	Writer(s)	Length
14.	"Trouble Boys"	Billy Bremner	2:49
15.	"Fashion" (Music video + Making of)	Andy McCoy, Michael Monroe	7:35
16.	"Boulevard Of Broken Dreams" (Live video)	Andy McCoy, Bob Ezrin, Ian Hunter	3:48
17.	"Highschool" (Live video)	Andy McCoy, Bob Ezrin	4:09

Japanese edition
No.	Title	Writer(s)	Length
14.	"Self Destruction Blues"	Andy McCoy	2:44
15.	"Worldshaker"	Tumppi Varonen, Andy McCoy, Michael Monroe	2:57

== Personnel ==
Hanoi Rocks

- Michael Monroe – lead vocals, saxophone, harmonica, piano
- Andy McCoy – lead guitar, piano, backing vocals
- Conny Bloom – rhythm guitar, backing vocals
- Andy Christell – bass, backing vocals
- Lacu – drums

== Charts ==
Chart (2007)	Peak position
Finnish Albums (Suomen virallinen lista)	6
Swedish Albums (Sverigetopplistan)	41
