= Until I Get You =

Single by Finnish band Hanoi Rocks

Single by Hanoi Rocks

from the album Back to Mystery City
- B-side: "Tragedy", "Rebel On The Run", "Oriental Beat"
- Released: 12 August 1983
- Recorded: 6–19 March 1983
- Genre: hard rock; glam punk; glam rock
- Length: 4:38
- Label: Johanna Kustannus, Lick Records
- Songwriter: Andy McCoy

Hanoi Rocks singles chronology
"Malibu Beach Nightmare" (1983)	"Until I Get You" (1983)	"Up Around the Bend" (1984)

"Until I Get You" is a single by the Finnish rock and glam punk band Hanoi Rocks. The band's guitarist and primary songwriter Andy McCoy wrote this song at the band's manager Seppo Vesterinen's house in Helsinki. McCoy hated the song, but the band's drummer Razzle loved it, and wanted it on their next record. Ultimately, McCoy also fell in love with the song. The song is a kind of ballad that explains Hanoi Rocks' own melodic style very well. Also, the arrangement for the song was inspired by Alice Cooper's "I'm Eighteen".

American band L.A. Guns covered the song on their album Rips the Covers Off in 2004.

== Track listing ==
Lick 7" single
No.	Title	Writer(s)	Length
1.	"Until I Get You"	Andy McCoy	4:38
2.	"Tragedy"	Andy McCoy	4:05

Johanna 7" single
No.	Title	Writer(s)	Length
1.	"Until I Get You"	Andy McCoy	4:38
2.	"Rebel On The Run"	Andy McCoy	2:51

Lick 12" Maxi-Single
No.	Title	Writer(s)	Length
1.	"Until I Get You"	Andy McCoy	4:38
2.	"Tragedy"	Andy McCoy	4:05
3.	"Oriental Beat"	Andy McCoy	3:09

Johanna 12" Maxi-Single
No.	Title	Writer(s)	Length
1.	"Until I Get You"	Andy McCoy	4:38
2.	"Tragedy"	Andy McCoy	4:05
3.	"Sailing Down The Tears"	Andy McCoy	4:09

== Personnel ==
- Michael Monroe - Lead vocals
- Andy McCoy - Lead guitar
- Nasty Suicide - Rhythm guitar
- Sam Yaffa - Bass
- Razzle - Drums
- Gyp Casino - Drums on "Tragedy" and "Oriental Beat"
- Morgan Fisher - Keyboards on "Until I Get You"
- Miriam Stockley - Backing vocals on "Until I Get You"
