= Back to Mystery City =

Studio album by Hanoi Rocks
- Released: May 1983
- Recorded: 1983
- Genres: Glam punk; hard rock; glam metal
- Length: 44:16
- Labels: Johanna Kustannus, Lick Records, Nippon Phonogram
- Producers: Dale "Buffin" Griffin and Pete "Overend" Watts

Hanoi Rocks chronology
Self Destruction Blues (1982)	Back to Mystery City (1983)	All Those Wasted Years (1984)

Singles from Back to Mystery City
- 1. "Malibu Beach Nightmare" Released: May 1983; 2. "Until I Get You" Released: 12 August 1983

Back to Mystery City is the fourth studio album by the Finnish rock band Hanoi Rocks, released in 1983. It was produced by ex-Mott the Hoople members Dale Griffin and Pete "Overend" Watts, and was the first with Razzle on drums. Besides Hanoi Rocks, the album also features keyboardist Morgan Fisher, and Miriam Stockley on backing vocals.

In 2017, Metal Hammer included the album in their list of "the 10 hair metal albums you need in your record collection".

== Song information ==
"Strange Boys Play Weird Openings"

An acoustic intro that Andy McCoy came-up with in the studio.

"Malibu Beach Nightmare"

McCoy wrote song at home while smoking hashish. The song was originally recorded in 1981 as a calypso version titled "Malibu Nightmare". This version was just made as a joke but it was re-recorded for this album, as a more serious rock song. The song was also released as a single.

"Mental Beat"

The song is about speed, and was inspired by Michael Monroe's wild behavior as a child. This was also the only song that (according to Pete Watts) drummer Razzle had a hard time recording.

"Tooting Bec Wreck"

This song was inspired by a London apartment full of rats, in Tooting Bec, where Hanoi Rocks lived.

"Until I Get You"

Andy McCoy wrote this song at the band's manager Seppo Vesterinen's house in Helsinki. McCoy hated the song but Razzle loved it, and wanted it on their next record. Ultimately, McCoy also fell in love with the song. The song is also an example of Hanoi Rocks' melodic glam rock-style. The arrangement for the song was inspired by Alice Cooper's "I'm Eighteen". L.A. Guns covered the song on their 2004 album Rips the Covers Off.

"Sailing Down the Tears"

Written in 10 minutes, but the band still loved the song. The song was written as a mid-tempo, standard 70's rock-, pop-song.

"Lick Summer Love"

This song sparked some controversy when it was released. McCoy wrote the song when he was 17 years old. The song deals with making love and having oral sex with his girlfriend. Monroe has since said that he thinks the song is an "awful slime-ball", and that he hated the lyrics.

"Beating Gets Faster"

A love-song written by Monroe and McCoy.

"Ice Cream Summer"

A song dealing with a summer romance.

"Back to Mystery City"

At the time of its release, the song was very popular, but it has since been overshadowed by the many other Hanoi Rocks' hits. Andy McCoy wrote the song about Hanoi Rocks' adventures in the Far-East, the band's fans and the buzz that was also surrounding the band in 1983. The song is also composed in the same style as Tommy James and the Shondells' song "Mony Mony". The song's title was inspired by the London club Mystery City.

== Critical reception ==
Professional ratings
Review scores
Source	Rating
AllMusic	4/5 stars
Kerrang!	(very favorable)
Robert Christgau	C+

In a contemporary review for The Village Voice, music critic Robert Christgau said that Monroe and McCoy lack hooks, are backed by "cute if over-calculated" dual guitar playing, and "yowl English-language lyrics that must impress Finns more than native speakers like myself."

In 2005, Back to Mystery City was ranked number 293 in Rock Hard magazine's book The 500 Greatest Rock & Metal Albums of All Time.

Back to Mystery City is also featured in the book 1001 Albums You Must Hear Before You Die.

== Track listing ==
All tracks are written by Andy McCoy, except "Beating Gets Faster", written by McCoy and Michael Monroe.

No.	Title	Length
1.	"Strange Boys Play Weird Openings"	0:42
2.	"Malibu Beach Nightmare"	2:46
3.	"Mental Beat"	5:04
4.	"Tooting Bec Wreck"	6:11
5.	"Until I Get You"	4:37
6.	"Sailing Down the Tears"	4:09
7.	"Lick Summer Love"	4:21
8.	"Beating Gets Faster"	3:51
9.	"Ice Cream Summer"	5:11
10.	"Back to Mystery City"	5:02

1988 U.S. version
No.	Title	Length
11.	"Rebel on the Run"	2:48

2013 Japanese remastered edition
No.	Title	Length
11.	"Malibu Beach Nightmare (Calypso)"	2:05
12.	"Back to Mystery City" (demo)	4:57
13.	"Until I Get You" (demo)	3:53
14.	"Ice Cream Summer" (demo)	4:22

== Personnel ==
Hanoi Rocks

- Michael Monroe – lead vocals, saxophone, harmonica
- Andy McCoy – lead guitar
- Nasty Suicide – rhythm guitar
- Sam Yaffa – bass
- Razzle – drums

Additional personnel

- Morgan Fisher – keyboards
- Miriam Stockley – backing vocals

== Production ==
=== Production personnel ===
- Producers: Dale Griffin and Pete "Overend" Watts
- Engineer: Andy Lyden
- Arrangers: Michael Monroe and Andy McCoy

=== Other personnel ===
- Cover photo: Fin Costello
- Layout: Hilary Goodwright

=== Remastering personnel ===
- Digitally remastered: Mika Jussila
- Reissue sleeve and booklet: Jari Mattila

== Charts ==
Chart (1983)	Peak position
Finnish Albums (The Official Finnish Charts)	6
Japanese Albums (Oricon)	64
UK Albums (Official Charts)	87
