= Warheads (band) =

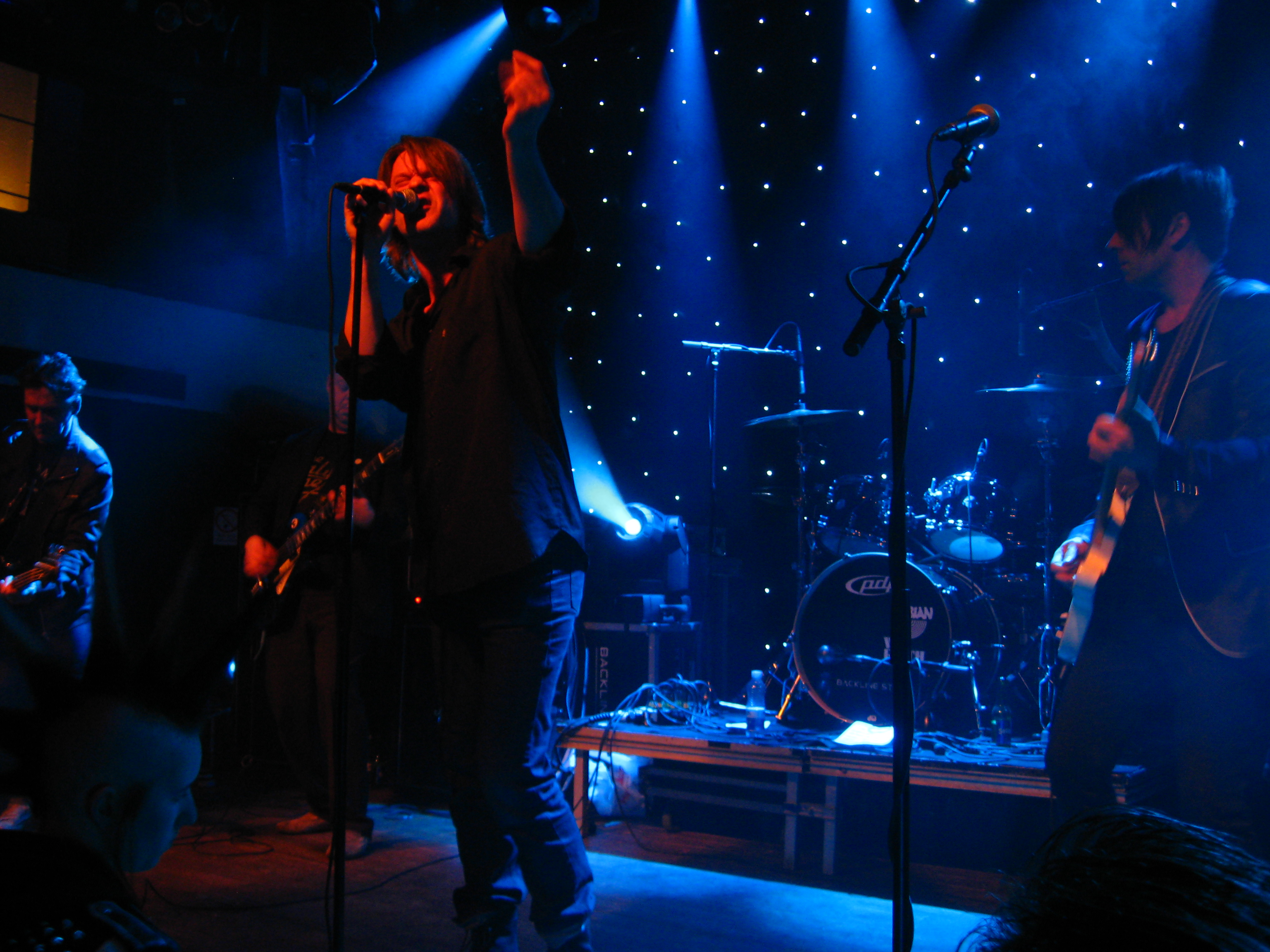
Warheads performing in Stockholm in 2010

Warheads was a Swedish punk rock band, active from 1979 to 1981. Several of the members continued in the 1980s in internationally known groups. Warheads has been cited as a precursor to thrash metal.

== History ==
Warheads has its origins in the band Mob, sometimes known as Mob -77. The band was formed in 1976 in a school in Stockholm. The initial lineup lasted for one gig, and led to the better-known line-up consisting of, among others, Mats Cavonius on vocals, Stellan Hemringe and Janne Oldeus (Pain, Imps, Jerry Williams) on guitar, Thomas Biström bass, and Peter Öman and Mike "Bruppe" Ramnesäter on drums. The band made a name for itself by among other things that Cavonius on a show, inspired by Iggy Pop, cut himself with a knife in the stomach. The band also participated in a punk film by Stig Larsson.

In 1978 and Biström left and Björne Fröberg (later in The Nomads) was added on bass. The band then changed its name to Aoouh!. Further changes came when Cavonius quit and Pelle Almgren joined the band as lead singer, leaving the band with Almgren on vocals, Fröberg on bass, Hemringe on guitar and Micke Ramnesäter on drums. The band changed their name again, this time to Warheads. Soon Ramnesäter quit the band, and was replaced by Jesper Sporre. In 1979 Warheads released their first EP, Dagen är natt and they started building a reputation outside Stockholm. In 1980 they appeared on the compilation LP Let It Out. Warheads continued to play gigs around the Stockholm area for a brief period, but struggled internally. Finally, in 1981 Almgren quit and Warheads broke up.

Pelle Almgren went on to found the glam rock band Easy Action. Björne Fröberg eventually became a member of The Nomads, and Jesper Sporre changed his name to Gyp Casino and became the drummer for Hanoi Rocks.

In 2004 musicians from bands like Maryslim, Backyard Babies, Hellacopters and The Maggots formed the one-off band Urrke T & the Midlife Crisis and recorded a 3-track single with cover versions of old Swedish punk songs, including Aoouh! / Warheads "Center of Lies".

== Members ==
1979

- Pelle Almgren - vocals
- Stellan Hemringe - guitar
- Björne Fröberg - bass
- Richard Lindberg - drums

1979–1981

- Pelle Almgren - vocals
- Stellan Hemringe - guitar
- Björne Fröberg - bass
- Jesper Sporre - drums

== Discography ==
- Dagen är natt (EP, 1979)
- Let It Out (compilation, 1980)
- Ståkkålmsjävlar 1978-1981 (compilation, 1986)
- Break the Rules, Volume 7 (compilation, 1996)
- Svenska punkklassiker 78-81 (compilation, 2003)
