= This One's for Rock'n'Roll =

Single by Hanoi Rocks

from the album Street Poetry
- Released: 8 August 2007
- Genre: Rock; hard rock
- Length: 3:45
- Label: Backstage Alliance
- Songwriters: Andy McCoy, Michael Monroe
- Producer: Hanoi Rocks

Hanoi Rocks singles chronology
| "Fashion" (2007) | "This One's for Rock'n'Roll" (2007) | "Teenage Revolution" (2007) |

"This One's for Rock'n'Roll" is single by the Finnish rock band Hanoi Rocks, first released as downloadable song. It is from their 2007 album Street Poetry. The song rose to the top 10 most-downloaded songs in Finland on 16 August 2007 and spent a week in the top 10.

== Personnel ==
- Michael Monroe – lead vocals, saxophone
- Andy McCoy – lead guitar
- Conny Bloom – rhythm guitar
- Andy Christell – bass
- Lacu – drums
