= Don't You Ever Leave Me =

Single by Hanoi Rocks

from the album Two Steps from the Move
- B-side: "Oil and Gasoline" and "Malibu Nightmare"
- Released: August 1984 (Finland), 8 October 1984 (UK)
- Recorded: 20 January – 24 March 1984
- Genre: Glam metal
- Length: 4:05
- Label: CBS
- Songwriter: Andy McCoy
- Producer: Bob Ezrin

Hanoi Rocks singles chronology
"Underwater World" (1984)	"Don't You Ever Leave Me" (1984)	"People Like Me" (2002)

"Don't You Ever Leave Me" is a song by Finnish rock n' roll band Hanoi Rocks, released as the third and final single from their 1984 album Two Steps from the Move.

"Don't You Ever Leave Me" made its first appearance as "Don't Never Leave Me" on Hanoi Rocks' first album Bangkok Shocks, Saigon Shakes, Hanoi Rocks (1981), but it had a more punky atmosphere and a faster tempo. They rewrote it in 1984 for Two Steps From The Move. The band's guitarist Andy McCoy, who wrote the song, commented in the Finnish Soundi magazine in 1984: "Well, yeah, we screwed up that song so bad back then, that we had to remake it now. As a song, I think it's fucking great and this version is what the original should have been."

The 12" single version differs from the album and 7" single versions, as the 12" single version features a narration (originally spoken by McCoy and Razzle) by McCoy in Spanish.

The B-side, "Oil And Gasoline" originally made its appearance on the "Underwater World" single in 1984.

"Malibu Nightmare" on the 12" single was originally featured on the Love's an Injection EP in 1982. The song was originally made as a joke and featured Nasty Suicide on bass, because Sam Yaffa was late from the recording. It was re-recorded for the band's 1983 album Back to Mystery City.

== Track listing ==
7" single
No.	Title	Writer(s)	Length
1.	"Don't You Ever Leave Me"	Andy McCoy	4:05
2.	"Oil And Gasoline"	Andy McCoy, Gregg Brown	4:42

12" single
No.	Title	Writer(s)	Length
1.	"Don't You Ever Leave Me"	Andy McCoy	4:05
2.	"Oil And Gasoline"	Andy McCoy	4:42
3.	"Malibu Nightmare"	Andy McCoy	2:03

== Personnel ==
- Michael Monroe - Lead vocals, saxophone
- Andy McCoy - Lead guitar, backing vocals
- Nasty Suicide - Rhythm guitar, bass on "Malibu Nightmare"
- Sam Yaffa - Bass
- Razzle - Drums
- Gyp Casino - Drums on "Malibu Beach (Calypso version)"
- Gregg Brown - Bass on "Oil And Gasoline"

== Cover versions ==
- Swedish hard rock band Hardcore Superstar released a cover version of "Don't You Ever Leave Me" as a bonus track on the Japanese version of their 2000 album Bad Sneakers and a Piña Colada.
- Finnish humppa band Eläkeläiset released a Finnish-language version of "Don't You Ever Leave Me", titled "Hyljätyn humppa" on their 2000 album Humppa-akatemia.
- Finnish rock/pop singer Olavi Uusivirta released a Finnish-language version of "Don't You Ever Leave Me", titled "Ennen kuin tää maailma loppuu", as a single in 2023.
- American musician Chris Shiflett, the lead guitarist for the rock band Foo Fighters, released a cover version of "Don't You Ever Leave Me" in his 2024 EP Starry Nights & Campfire Lights.
