= Fashion (Hanoi Rocks song) =

Single by Hanoi Rocks

from the album Street Poetry
- Released: 16 May 2007
- Recorded: March–April 2007
- Genre: Hard rock
- Length: 3:18
- Label: Wolfgang Records
- Songwriter(s): Andy McCoy, Michael Monroe
- Producer(s): Hanoi Productions

Hanoi Rocks singles chronology
"Back in Yer Face" (2005)	"Fashion" (2007)	"This One's for Rock'n'Roll" (2007)

"Fashion" is a single by the Finnish rock and glam punk band Hanoi Rocks from the album Street Poetry. The single was released on 16 May 2007 in Finland and Europe and on 21 June in Japan. The single rose to number one on the Finnish singles list on 23 May.

The single also featured a cover of the Billy Bremner song "Trouble Boys".

Before the album's release, the band's guitarist Andy McCoy said that every song on the album had single-potential, but "Fashion" happened to be the first finished song.

A music video was also made which depicted the band performing on a catwalk with fashion models.

== Track listing ==
1. "Fashion" – 3:18 (Monroe/McCoy)
2. "Trouble Boys" – 2:49 (Bremner)
3. "Fashion" (video)
4. "Boulevard of Broken Dreams" (video)

== Personnel ==
- Michael Monroe – vocals
- Andy McCoy – lead guitar
- Conny Bloom – rhythm guitar
- Andy Christell – bass
- Lacu – drums
