= Self Destruction Blues =

1982 album by Hanoi Rocks

Compilation album by Hanoi Rocks
- Released: August 1982
- Recorded: 1980–1982
- Genres: Glam punk; hard rock; glam metal
- Length: 40:41
- Labels: Johanna Kustannus, Lick Records
- Producers: "The Muddy Twins" (Andy McCoy and Michael Monroe)

Hanoi Rocks chronology
Oriental Beat (1982)	Self Destruction Blues (1982)	Back to Mystery City (1983)

Singles from Self Destruction Blues
- 1. "I Want You" Released: November 1980; 2. "Desperados" Released: November 1981; 3. "Dead by X-Mas" Released: December 1981; 4. "Love's an Injection" Released: 1982

Professional ratings
Review scores
Source	Rating
AllMusic	4/5 stars

Self Destruction Blues is the third album by the Finnish rock band Hanoi Rocks, released in 1982. Although often listed as a studio album, Self Destruction Blues is a compilation of singles and B-sides that the band recorded in 1981 and 1982. None of the tracks on Self Destruction Blues, however, appear on their previous albums. Guns N' Roses were rumoured to have recorded a cover version of "Beer and a Cigarette" for their 1993 release "The Spaghetti Incident?". Of note is the fact that although Gyp Casino plays on the LP, his replacement Razzle actually appears on the cover.

"Dead by X-Mas" has been covered by the Japanese hardcore band The Piass in 1994, and the British electro group Sohodolls in 2007.

In 2018, Collin Brennan of Consequence included Self Destruction Blues in his list of "10 Hair Metal Albums That Don’t Suck", and in 2019, Rolling Stone magazine ranked the album at #23 in its list of the "50 Greatest Hair Metal Albums of All Time".

== Track listing ==
No.	Title	Writer(s)	Length
1.	"Love's an Injection"	Andy McCoy	3:26
2.	"I Want You"	Andy McCoy	3:14
3.	"Café Avenue"	Andy McCoy	3:22
4.	"Nothing New"	Andy McCoy	3:19
5.	"Kill City Kills"	Andy McCoy, Ralf Örn	4:27
6.	"Self Destruction Blues"	Andy McCoy	2:44
7.	"Beer and a Cigarette"	Andy McCoy	3:21
8.	"Whispers in the Dark"	Andy McCoy, Grant, Ian Vincent	3:34
9.	"Taxi Driver"	Andy McCoy	4:16
10.	"Desperados"	Andy McCoy	3:59
11.	"Problem Child"	Andy McCoy	2:01
12.	"Dead by X-Mas"	Andy McCoy	2:58

2013 Japanese remastered edition
No.	Title	Writer(s)	Length
13.	"In The Year '79 (It's Too Late)"	Andy McCoy	2:16
14.	"Love's An Injection" (demo)	Andy McCoy	3:04
15.	"Black Sabbath" (featuring Razzle on vocals & Michael on drums. Black Sabbath cover)	Tony Iommi, Ozzy Osbourne, Geezer Butler, Bill Ward	4:02

== Personnel ==
Hanoi Rocks

- Michael Monroe – vocals, saxophone, drums on track 15
- Andy McCoy – guitars
- Nasty Suicide – guitars
- Sam Yaffa – bass
- Gyp Casino – drums on tracks 1, 3, 4 and 6–14

Additional musicians

- Razzle – vocals on track 15
- Keimo Hirvonen – drums on track 2 and 5

== Charts ==
Chart (1982)	Peak position
Finnish Albums (The Official Finnish Charts)	28
