= Million Miles Away (Hanoi Rocks song) =

Song by Hanoi Rocks

from the album Two Steps from the Move
- Released: August 1984
- Recorded: March, 1984 at Record Plant, New York, USA
- Genre: Glam punk Hard rock
- Length: 4:47
- Label: CBS
- Songwriters: Andy McCoy, Bob Ezrin, Michael Monroe
- Producer: Bob Ezrin

"Million Miles Away" is a ballad by the Finnish hard rock band Hanoi Rocks.

The song was originally written by guitarist Andy McCoy in the 1970s under the name "Never Get Enough". McCoy worked on the song on the piano for years, but it was never fully completed. In the Fall of 1983, a raw demo version was made, and when the pre-production for the album Two Steps From The Move started, the song was again brought out. Musician Pete Brown was also present for some of the writing process for the album and wrote many lyrics himself. Although the only piece of lyrics that were used are 'Smoked a lot of sky, drank a lot of rain', which are featured in "Million Miles Away".

The song features a saxophone-solo by singer Michael Monroe and the guitar solo played by Nasty Suicide, rather than Andy McCoy. At live performances Andy McCoy would often play the piano, while the other guitarist would play guitar.

Even though "Million Miles Away" wasn't released as a single (except in Japan), it still remains as one of Hanoi Rocks' most popular and well-known songs. After the death of the band's drummer Razzle, the song was dedicated to him.

== Personnel ==
- Michael Monroe – Lead Vocals, Saxophone
- Andy McCoy – Guitars
- Nasty Suicide – Guitars
- Sam Yaffa – Bass
- Razzle – Drums
- Bob Ezrin - Keyboards, percussion
