= Coyote Shivers =

Canadian musician and actor

- Born: Francis Shivers
- Origin: Toronto, Ontario, Canada
- Occupations: Actor, singer
- Spouse(s): Bebe Buell (m. 1992; div. 1999) Pauley Perrette (m. 2000; div. 2006)

Francis "Coyote" Shivers is a Canadian-American musician and actor.

== Career ==
Shivers co-produced the first single for the band Shadowy Men on a Shadowy Planet. The B-side to that single, "Having an Average Weekend," became the theme to the television show The Kids in the Hall. He also co-produced the band's first two albums.

In addition to his music career, Shivers has appeared in various independent films, including Empire Records along with Liv Tyler and Down and Out with the Dolls (directed by Kurt Voss).

== Personal life and legal issues ==
Shivers' personal life has been the subject of public attention, particularly his relationships. He was married to model and singer Bebe Buell from 1992 to 1999. In 2000, he married actress Pauley Perrette, best known for her role on NCIS. Their marriage ended in divorce in 2006, following allegations by Perrette, Buell, and former girlfriend Angela Garber of abuse, stalking, and harassment. These allegations included claims of physical, sexual, and psychological abuse. In 2008, Shivers was declared a vexatious litigant by the Los Angeles County Superior Court, preventing him from filing lawsuits without prior judicial approval due to repeated accusations of using the legal system to harass others.

Shivers faced further controversy in January 2021, when the Hollywood United Neighbourhood Council censured him for violations of the council's code of conduct. The censure cited his failure to treat other board members and the public with respect, regardless of political affiliation.

== Discography ==
=== Albums ===
- Coyote Shivers (1996) Mutiny
- 1/2 A Rock & Roll Record (1999) The Orchard (EP)
- Gives It To Ya. Twice (2004) Foodchain Records (double CD)

=== Soundtrack contributions ===
- Empire Records, 1995 (song "Sugarhigh")
- Time of Your Life, 1999 TV Series (song "Something Happens" in episode "The Time They Threw That Party")
- Down and Out with the Dolls, 2001 (theme song "I Wanna Remember Tonight")
- Girl in 3D, 2004

== Filmography ==
- Johnny Mnemonic, 1995
- Empire Records, 1995
- Smut, 1999
- Down and Out with the Dolls, 2001
- Girl in 3D, 2004
- Boys & Girls Guide To Getting Down, 2006
