= Tragedy (Hanoi Rocks song) =

Single by Hanoi Rocks

from the album Bangkok Shocks, Saigon Shakes, Hanoi Rocks
- B-side: "Café Avenue", "Don't Never Leave Me"
- Released: February 1981 (Finland, Sweden), April 1982 (Japan)
- Recorded: January 1981
- Genre: Hard rock; glam punk; glam metal
- Length: 4:05
- Label: Johanna Kustannus, Tandan, Nippon Phonogram
- Songwriter(s): Andy McCoy
- Producer(s): The Muddy Twins (Andy McCoy and Michael Monroe)

Hanoi Rocks singles chronology
"I Want You" (1980)	"Tragedy" (1981)	"Desperados" (1981)

"Tragedy" is a single by the Finnish rock band Hanoi Rocks, from the album Bangkok Shocks, Saigon Shakes, Hanoi Rocks, but "Tragedy" was released a little before the release of the album. "Tragedy" and its B-side, "Café Avenue", are the most well-known songs from Hanoi Rocks's early career.

"Tragedy" was written by the band's guitarist Andy McCoy when he was 15 or 16. The lyrics basically deal with a typical teen story of a first love and how one imagines it will last forever. At some point it all collapses and it feels that the world is breaking. The result is a "tragedy" and tears. The song is very energetic and has a fast tempo. It is also melodic, even though the guitar parts are a punk style. "Tragedy" was recorded at Park Studios outside Stockholm at the Bangkok Shocks, Saigon Shakes, Hanoi Rocks recordings.

"Café Avenue" talks about Hanoi Rocks's individualist-attitude and how it doesn't matter how you look and who you are. The song also features a story told from the point of view of a character who lives a rough, young and wild life, but eventually has to turn to prostitution to earn money. The story is largely inspired by Hanoi Rocks's own life on the streets of Stockholm, where people thought the band were homosexual prostitutes because of their glam rock-look. This song was also recorded at Park Studios outside Stockholm at the Bangkok Shocks, Saigon Shakes, Hanoi Rocks recordings. "Café Avenue" wasn't released on an album until 1982's Self Destruction Blues.

On the Japanese single, the song "Don't Never Leave Me" was used as the B-side. The song was later reworked in to a hit-version titled "Don't You Ever Leave Me", which is featured on the album Two Steps from the Move.

== Track listing ==
Johanna and Tandan version
No.	Title	Writer(s)	Length
1.	"Tragedy"	Andy McCoy	4:05
2.	"Café Avenue"	Andy McCoy	3:26

Nippon Phonogram version
No.	Title	Writer(s)	Length
1.	"Tragedy"	Andy McCoy	4:05
2.	"Don't Never Leave Me"	Andy McCoy	3:57

== Personnel ==
- Michael Monroe - lead vocals
- Andy McCoy - lead guitar, backing vocals
- Nasty Suicide - rhythm guitar, backing vocals
- Sam Yaffa - bass
- Gyp Casino - drums
