= The Suicide Twins =

Finnish rock band

Background information
- Origin: Finland
- Genres: Rock, acoustic rock
- Years active: 1986–1987
- Labels: Yahoo! Records
- Past members: Andy McCoy; Nasty Suicide

The Suicide Twins was a Finnish rock band, set up by Andy McCoy and Nasty Suicide (here credited as Nasty Superstar) after the break-up of Hanoi Rocks. The band managed to record only one album, Silver Missiles and Nightingales. This was done with acoustic guitars, with the two sharing vocal duties along with the late René Berg. The band filmed a video for the single "Sweet Pretending" which features Nasty lip-synching as the song features Rene on lead vocals. The album was issued on CD by Castle Communications and is considered a classic by many. The song "The Best Is Yet to Come" was later covered by Samantha Fox. The album was actually recorded the same time as the EPs by the Cherry Bombz.
