= Malibu Beach Nightmare =

Single by Hanoi Rocks

from the album Back to Mystery City
- B-side: "Rebel On The Run"
- Released: May 1983
- Recorded: 6–19 March 1983
- Genre: hard rock; glam punk; glam rock
- Length: 2:48
- Label: Lick Records
- Songwriter: Andy McCoy

Hanoi Rocks singles chronology
"Love's An Injection" (1982)	"Malibu Beach Nightmare" (1983)	"Until I Get You" (1983)

"Malibu Beach Nightmare" (also known simply as "Malibu Beach") is a single and EP released only in the UK by the Finnish rock and glam punk band Hanoi Rocks. The song is from their 1983 album, Back to Mystery City, but the single was released just before the album in the UK. The song was written by the band's guitarist and primary songwriter, Andy McCoy.

The EP's second song, "Taxi Driver", is from the band's third album, Self Destruction Blues, and was also released on the Love's An Injection EP and single. "Taxi Driver" was recorded almost in one take at Farmyard Studio, outside London. "Taxi Driver" remains one of Hanoi Rocks' most well-known songs. The EP's third song, and the single's B-side, "Rebel On The Run", was mixed by Dale "Buffin" Griffin and Pete "Overend" Watts and was recorded at Alaska Studio. The fourth song on the EP, "Beer And A Cigarette", was recorded in the same sessions as "Taxi Driver".

"Malibu Beach Nightmare" was covered by Peppermint Creeps on their 2008 album Cover Up.

== Track listing ==
7" single
No.	Title	Writer(s)	Length
1.	"Malibu Beach"	Andy McCoy	2:48
2.	"Rebel On The Run"	Andy McCoy	2:58

EP
No.	Title	Writer(s)	Length
1.	"Malibu Beach"	Andy McCoy	2:48
2.	"Taxi Driver"	Andy McCoy	4:16
3.	"Rebel On The Run"	Andy McCoy	2:51
4.	"Beer And A Cigarette"	Andy McCoy	3:21

== Personnel ==
- Michael Monroe - Lead vocals, saxophone
- Andy McCoy - Lead guitar
- Nasty Suicide - Rhythm guitar
- Sam Yaffa - Bass
- Razzle - Drums
- Gyp Casino - Drums on "Taxi Driver"
