= Knox (British musician) =

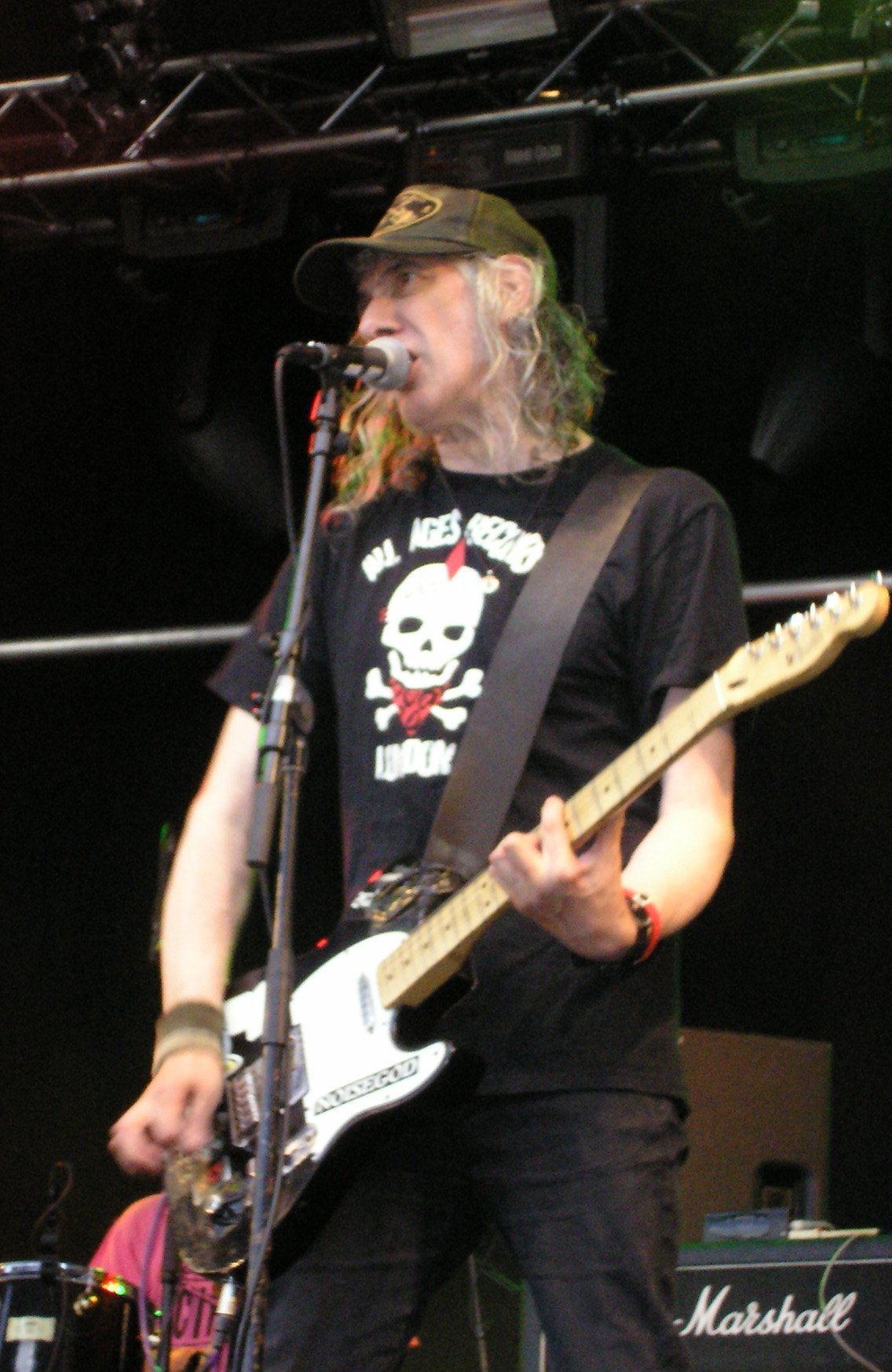
- Knox playing with The Vibrators at Augustibuller 2007.

Background information
- Born: Ian Milroy Carnochan; 4 September 1945 (age 80); Cricklewood, London, England
- Genres: Punk
- Occupations: Singer, guitarist, songwriter
- Instruments: Vocals, guitar, piano
- Formerly of: The Vibrators; Fallen Angels

Ian Milroy Carnochan (born 4 September 1945), known professionally as Knox, is a British musician and founding member of the seminal punk band the Vibrators.

== Biography ==
Born in London, he spent his formative years in Cricklewood, (North West London) and then Watford, where he became interested in the guitar at the age of thirteen. He was in various school bands, based at Watford Grammar School for Boys, including The Renegades and Knox and the Knight Ryders. Knox's budding musical development was gradually put on hold when he went to art school (in Watford, and in the West of England), where he developed an interest in painting.

In 1972, Knox returned to playing music and in early 1976 was a founder member of the Vibrators, a Pub Rock band that cut its hair, changed its wardrobe, and jumped on the post-Sex Pistols punk bandwagon, despite its members being 10 years older than most of the originator bands. The Vibrators' blatant careerism was held up by Melody Maker writer Caroline Coon as an example of the downside of the "punk explosion". As well as being the frontman, he was the main songwriter for the band, writing such songs as "Baby Baby", "London Girls" and "Automatic Lover" (the latter a top 40 UK Singles Chart hit). The band played the legendary 100 Club Punk Festival with guitar legend Chris Spedding, who produced the single "Pogo Dancing".

After the Vibrators broke up, Knox worked as a solo artist, recording an album Plutonium Express, which came out on the Razor record label in 1983. He also played guitar on Robyn Hitchcock's solo debut album, Black Snake Diamond Role. He did two gigs with Alex Chilton, one of which was recorded and released as the album, Live in London. Also in 1983, Knox played guitar and wrote material for the Urban Dogs, a band with Charlie Harper from the U.K. Subs, and produced an album of the same name. He also played guitar on the U.K. Subs' 1988 album Japan Today.

In 1984, Knox formed the band Fallen Angels with members of Hanoi Rocks. They recorded one eponymous album (Fallen Angels on Fall Out Records, 1984), but never played live. Knox continued the Fallen Angels project for two more albums, along with occasional gigs, with a new line-up and occasional guest appearances from Hanoi Rocks members: In Loving Memory (Jungle Records, 1986) and Wheel of Fortune (Jungle Records, 1988).

With the renewed interest in punk the original line-up of The Vibrators re-formed in 1982, and, with Knox as a constant notwithstanding various line-up changes, has continued working since doing several tours a year. Knox also wrote a book on the Vibrators, The Vibrators – 21 Years of Punk Mania, stating "nobody else seemed interested in doing it, so I did it".

Knox's painting is inspired by both classical artists, and contemporary artists like Salvador Dalí, Peter Blake and Richard Hamilton. He has painted numerous portraits of punk icons, including Joe Strummer and Joey Ramone, as well as Leatherface, plus paintings of landscapes and buildings. (About eighty of Knox's paintings can be seen at the second external link shown below.)

Knox is currently running a music memorabilia store called Rock 'N' Roll Rescue in Camden next to the Dublin Castle, Camden, with cash raised being given to local charities.
