= The Vibrators =

British punk rock band

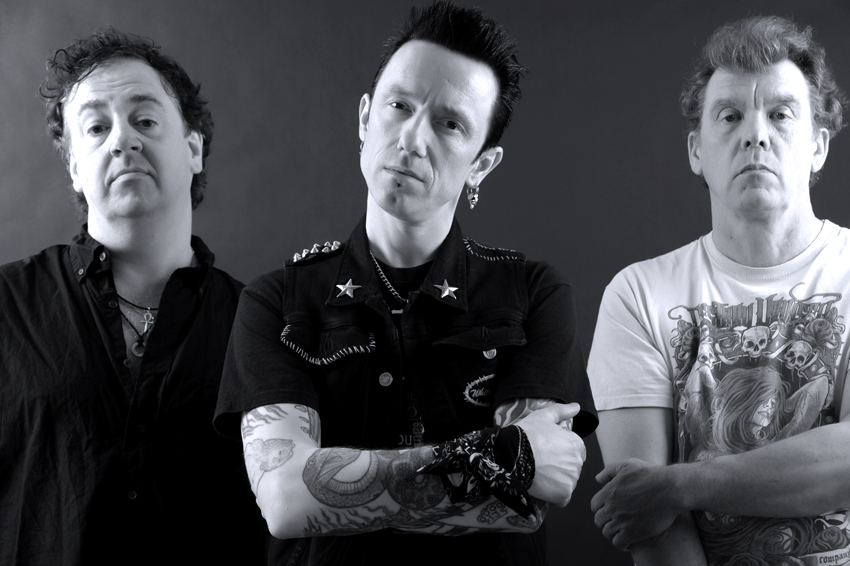
- Current line-up. L to R: Nigel Bennett, Pete Honkamaki, Eddie Edwards

Background information
- Origin: London, England
- Genres: Punk rock
- Years active: 1976–2022
- Labels: Cleopatra, Rak, Columbia, Epic, Anagram, Rat Race, Ram Records, Carrere, FM/Revolver, Dojo, Track
- Members: Ian "Knox" Carnochan; Nigel Bennett; Pete Honkamaki; John 'Eddie' Edwards
- Past members: Pat Collier; John Ellis; Gary Tibbs; Dave Birch; Don Snow; Ben Brierly; Greg van Cook; Kip; Ian Woodcock; Phil Ram; Adrian Wyatt; Noel Thompson; Mickie Owen; Mark Duncan; Darrell Bath; Nick Peckham; Robbie Tart
- Website: The Vibrators' official site

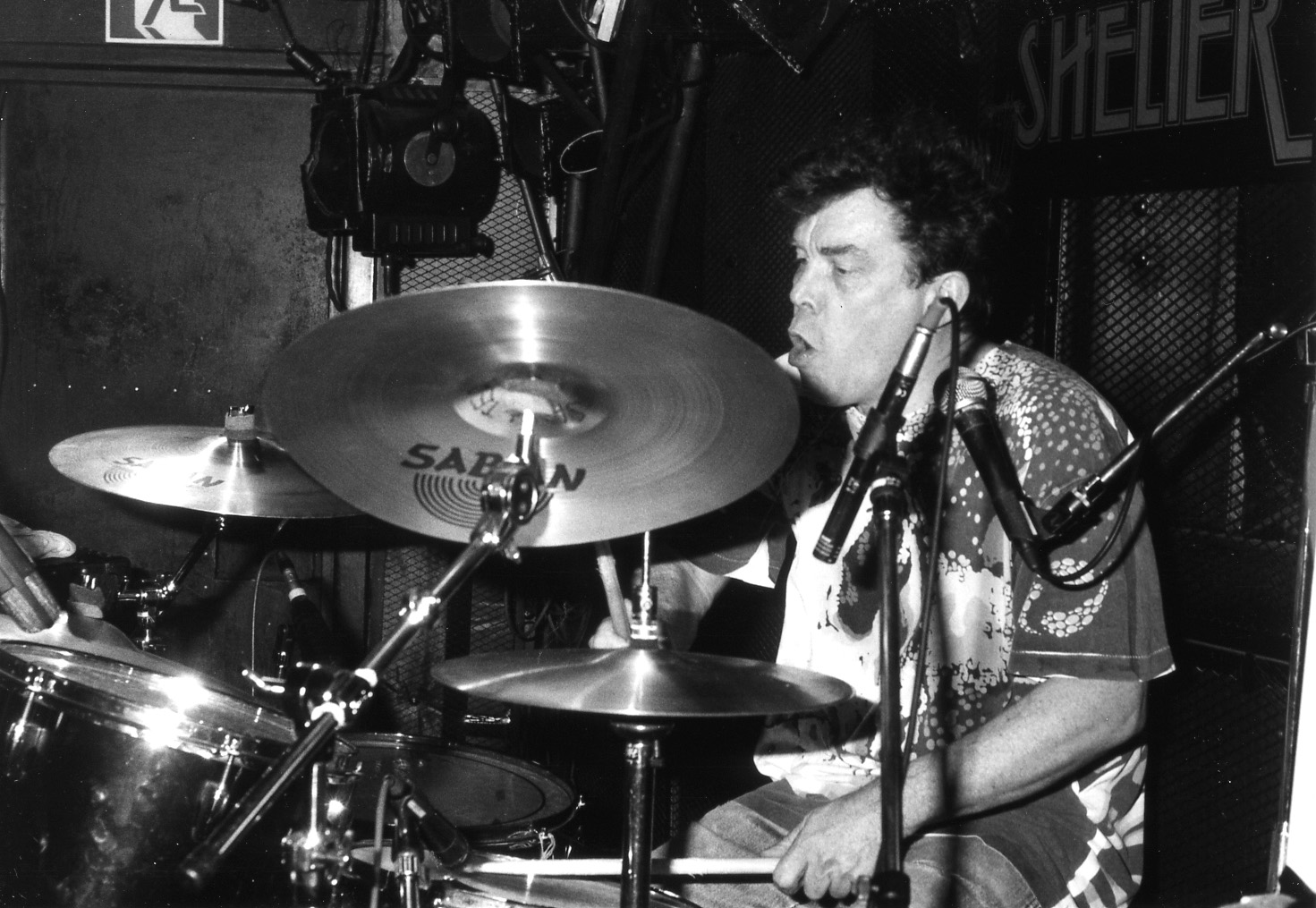
John "Eddie" Edwards, drummer for the Vibrators

The Vibrators were a British punk rock band whose greatest success was in 1977–1978 with the albums Pure Mania and V2. Their first Epic Records single "Baby Baby" is considered a punk classic. A year later, their single "Automatic Lover" hit No. 35 on the UK charts.

== Career ==
=== Early career ===
The Vibrators were founded by Ian "Knox" Carnochan, bassist Pat Collier, guitarist John Ellis, and drummer John 'Eddie' Edwards. They first came to public notice at the 100 Club when they backed Chris Spedding in 1976. On Spedding's recommendation, Mickie Most signed them to his label RAK Records. Most produced their first single, "We Vibrate". The band also backed Spedding on his single, "Pogo Dancing".

The Vibrators recorded sessions for John Peel at BBC Radio 1 in October 1976, June 1977, and February 1978. They were one of the pioneering punk bands that played at London's Roxy Club. They headlined in January 1977, supported by the Drones, and in February they played twice at the venue. In March 1977, the band supported Iggy Pop on his British tour. Later that year, they backed ex-Mott the Hoople frontman Ian Hunter.

=== Epic Records ===
The band signed to Epic Records in early 1977. Their debut album, Pure Mania was co-produced with Robin Mayhew, the sound engineer for David Bowie's Ziggy Stardust live shows, and reached the top 50 of the UK Albums Chart. The album is well regarded by some music critics and, 17 years after its release, The Guinness Encyclopedia of Popular Music named Pure Mania one of the 50 best punk albums of all time.

Their follow-up album, V2, narrowly missed the UK top 30. The only single to be taken from that album, "Automatic Lover", was the only Vibrators' single to reach the UK top 40 where it reached No. 35. It earned the band a TV appearance on the prime-time TV show Top of the Pops. The Vibrators' final single on Epic, "Judy Says (Knock You in the Head)", was released in June 1978. It reached No. 70 on the UK singles chart. Years later it was included in Mojo magazine's list of the best punk rock singles of all time.

=== Later years ===
During the 1980s, John Ellis recorded with Peter Gabriel, as well as recording and touring frequently with Peter Hammill, then subsequently the Stranglers, eventually joining the latter full-time in the 1990s. Pat Collier went on to work closely with the Soft Boys, producing their seminal album Underwater Moonlight, and Robyn Hitchcock, producing and mixing some of his solo albums (to which Knox also sometimes contributed). Phil Ram went on to form Able Ram and brought out two singles, "Disco in Moscow" and "Hope We Make It", although without any chart success. Despite numerous line-up changes, the Vibrators continued to record and tour as a three-piece, with "Eddie" being the only original member.

In 2020, the original lineup of Knox, Eddie, Ellis and Collier reunited to record and release the studio album Mars Casino with Chris Spedding providing production, additional guitar, and vocals.

In January 2022, the Vibrators released the new single "He's a Psycho". In July that year, the line-up of Knox, Honkamaki, Bennett and Eddie announced the release of Fall into the Sky claimed to be the final Vibrators album.

Since 2022, the band states in its official website that it would do "no more gigs" but "that individuals from the band might still be doing things".

Collier died on 27 July 2024, at the age of 72.

== Influence ==
The band Stiff Little Fingers took its name from the Vibrators' song of the same title. The song was penned by John Ellis, and appeared on the Vibrators' debut album Pure Mania. Second wave punk band the Exploited covered the Vibrators' song "Troops of Tomorrow" and used it as the title track for their 1982 album. A cover of "Troops of Tomorrow" was also recorded by the Polish death metal band Vader, and released as a bonus track on the band's 2011 album, Welcome to the Morbid Reich.

== Discography ==
=== Studio albums ===
- Pure Mania (Epic, EPC 82097, June 1977) – UK No. 49
- V2 (Epic, EPC 82495, April 1978) – UK No. 33
- Guilty (Anagram, GRAM 002, 1982)
- Alaska 127 – 1984
- Fifth Amendment – 1985
- Recharged – 1988
- Meltdown – 1988
- Vicious Circle – 1989
- Volume 10 – 1990
- Hunting for You – 1994
- French Lessons with Correction – 1997
- Buzzin' – 1999
- Energize – 2002
- Punk: The Early Years – 2006 (cover album)
- Garage Punk – 2009 (cover album)
- Under the Radar – 2009
- On the Guest List – 2013
- Punk Mania: Back to the Roots – 2014
- Past, Present and into the Future – 2017
- Mars Casino (Cleopatra Records) – 2020
- Fall into the Sky (Cleopatra Records) – 2022

=== Compilations ===
- Noise Boys – 2000
- Pure Punk – 2009 (cover album)

=== Splits ===
- Across the Pond (Die Laughing Records) split The Vibrators/Screaming Bloody Marys – 2018

=== Singles released up to 1980 ===
- "We Vibrate" / "Whips and Furs" (RAK, RAK 245, November 1976)
- "Pogo Dancing" / "The Pose" (RAK, RAK 246, November 1976) by Chris Spedding; the Vibrators performed the song in TV appearances
- "Bad Time" / "No Heart" (RAK, RAK 253, March 1977)
- "Baby Baby" / "Into the Future" (Epic Records, SEPC 5302, May 1977)
- "London Girls" (Live) / "Stiff Little Fingers" (Live) (Epic Records, SEPC 5565, August 1977)
- "Automatic Lover" / "Destroy" (Epic Records, SEPC 6137, March 1978) – UK No. 35
- "Judy Says (Knock You in the Head)" / "Pure Mania" (Epic Records, SEPC 6393, June 1978) – UK No. 70
- "Disco in Moscow" / "Take a Chance" (Rat Race Records, RAT 4, October 1980)

== See also ==
- List of punk bands from the United Kingdom
- List of 1970s punk rock musicians
- List of Peel Sessions
- List of performers on Top of the Pops
- Music of the United Kingdom (1970s)
