= Gyp Casino =

Swedish rock drummer

Gyp Casino (born as Jesper Sporre on 7 May 1961) is a Swedish rock drummer. He played in Swedish punk rock band Warheads (under his real name) and was the original drummer for Hanoi Rocks. He was replaced by Razzle in 1982. Although he does not appear on the cover for Self Destruction Blues, Casino does play on the record.

In 1989 Gyp Casino joined the band Pelle Almgren & Wow Liksom. They performed in Swedish language and had few hit songs in Sweden. They released an album Allting Är Bra. In 1995, Casino reunited with former Hanoi Rocks bandmate Andy McCoy for a tour with his then band Shooting Gallery. Casino also played drums on Andy McCoy's solo album Building on Tradition (1995)

== Discography ==
=== Hanoi Rocks ===
- Bangkok Shocks, Saigon Shakes, Hanoi Rocks (1981)
- Oriental Beat (1982)
- Self Destruction Blues (1982)
