= Razzle (musician) =

British drummer (1960–1984)

- Razzle for a magazine in 1984

Background information
- Born: Nicholas Charles Dingley; 2 December 1960; Royal Leamington Spa, Warwickshire, England
- Died: 8 December 1984 (aged 24) Redondo Beach, California, U.S.
- Genres: Rock; glam punk; punk rock; glam rock; hard rock; glam metal
- Occupation: Drummer
- Years active: 1977–1984
- Formerly of: Hanoi Rocks

Nicholas Charles Dingley (2 December 1960 – 8 December 1984), better known by his stage name Razzle, was an English musician, who was the drummer of the Finnish glam rock band Hanoi Rocks from 1982 until his death in 1984.

== Early years ==
Razzle was born in Royal Leamington Spa, England, to a young single mother, Patricia Ingram (-2025), who decided to give up her child for adoption. He was adopted by Henry (1923-1988) and Irene Dingley (1916-2001). The family's only child, he grew up in Coventry, after which the family moved to the village of Binstead, Isle of Wight.

Prior to joining Hanoi Rocks, Razzle started playing in local Binstead small ensembles, one of which was called Thin Red Line. In 1980, he moved to London, where he played in several punk rock bands. He joined Demon Preacher (featuring Nik Wade, later of Alien Sex Fiend), The Fuck Pigs and The Dark, with whom he released one EP The Living End Live in 1981, which was recorded at the band's last gig in London's 100 Club which, in his own words, "was heavy punk, almost heavy metal".

== Hanoi Rocks ==
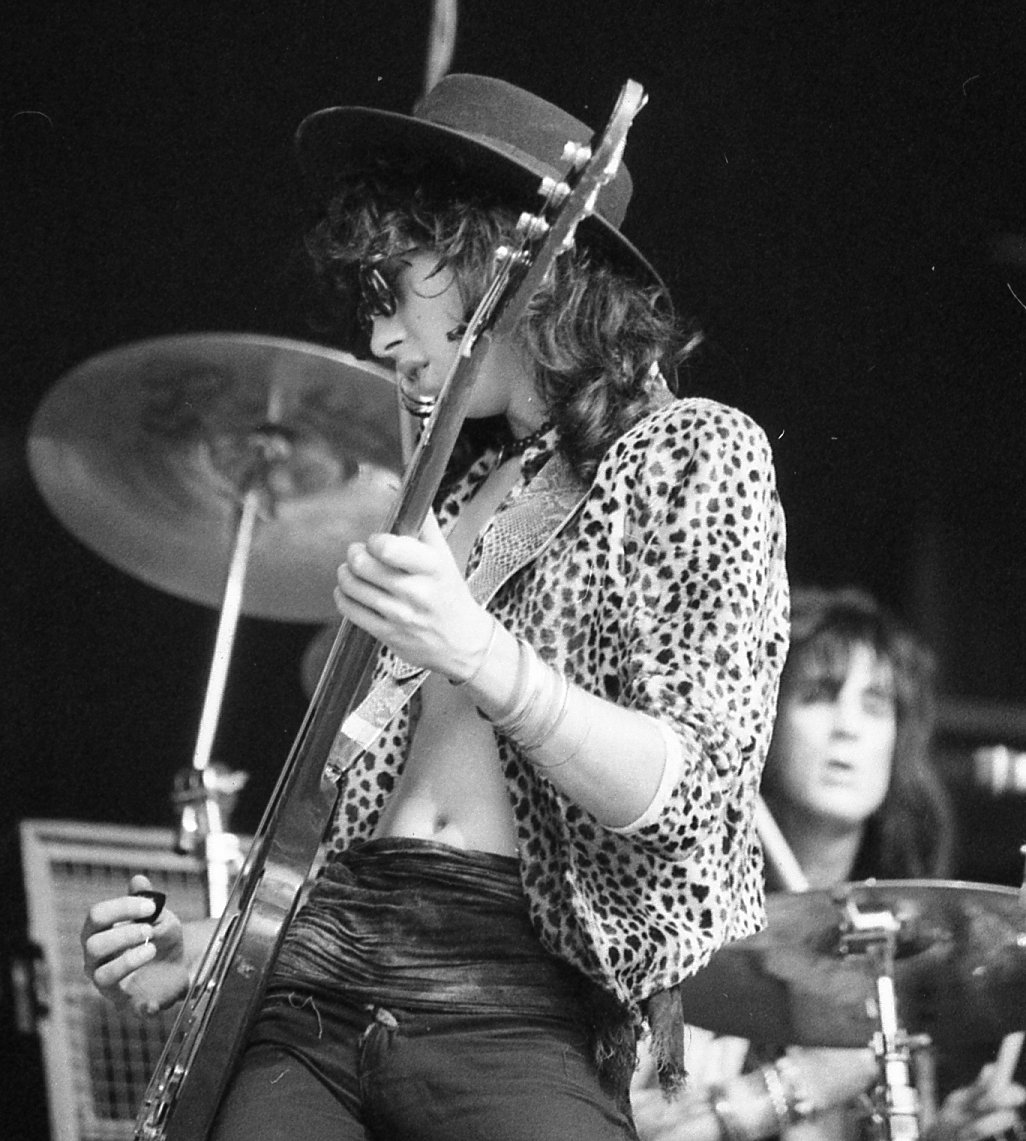
Sami Yaffa (left) and Razzle (right) on stage with Hanoi Rocks

After seeing Hanoi Rocks perform at the Zig-Zag Club, in London, Razzle went backstage and asked to be the band's drummer. Gyp Casino, who had been the band's drummer, was fired a few months later, and Razzle became his replacement.

Despite being the only English member, Razzle bonded with the other members of the group, and became an important element of Hanoi Rocks, due to his ability to find a way out of difficult times and problems between members.

Although Razzle was depicted on the Self Destruction Blues album cover, he did not play on the record.

Razzle played drums on two studio albums Back to Mystery City (1983) and Two Steps from the Move (1984) and official live album All Those Wasted Years (1984)

In 1984, Razzle, along with the other members of Hanoi Rocks, appeared on the Hanoi Rocks side project The Fallen Angels and played on the album Fallen Angels. The side project was led by Knox of The Vibrators. At the time, Knox and the Hanoi Rocks shared the same manager.

Hanoi Rocks signed to CBS in 1983 and began to spread their name in Britain; their remake of Creedence Clearwater Revival's "Up Around the Bend" became their only United Kingdom chart single the next year, from the album Two Steps from the Move. Years later, bass player Sami Yaffa disclosed that he and Razzle were planning to leave the band, citing guitarist Andy McCoy's behaviour as the main cause.

== Death ==
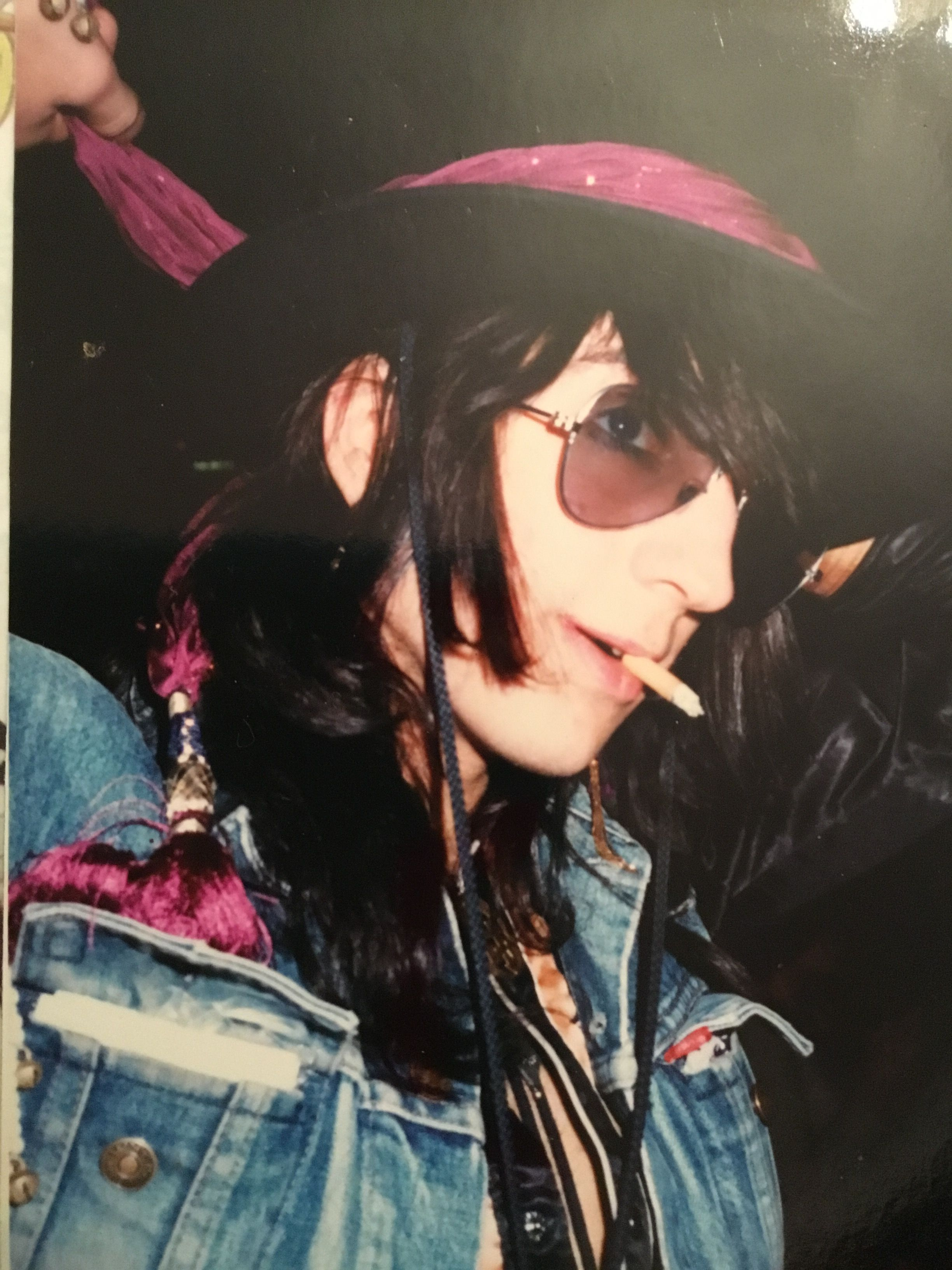
Razzle performing

In late 1984, Hanoi Rocks were on their first American tour. Frontman Michael Monroe fractured his ankle, so the band canceled several scheduled performances for his treatment and recovery. During that break, Mötley Crüe's lead vocalist Vince Neil invited the band to visit his home in Redondo Beach, California.

On 8 December, Hanoi Rocks band members were partying with Mötley Crüe at Neil's house. The party stopped when everybody noticed they were out of beer. Neil and Razzle, both drunk, went to a nearby liquor store in Neil's De Tomaso Pantera, with Neil driving. On the way back, they crashed into another car. Razzle was rushed to the hospital and pronounced dead at 7:12 p.m.; he had died instantly in the collision.

Both occupants of the other car were seriously injured, sustaining brain damage as a result of the crash. Vince Neil was charged with vehicular manslaughter and driving under the influence of alcohol in connection with the crash. His blood alcohol content was 0.17, above the California legal limit at that time of 0.10.

Andy McCoy and Mötley Crüe drummer Tommy Lee went looking for Neil and Razzle. They drove by the crash site and saw Neil handcuffed and placed in a police car. They were informed that Razzle had been taken to a hospital, where he was pronounced dead. McCoy informed the band's manager Seppo Vesterinen, who then told the rest of the band.

Razzle was buried at Holy Cross Church in Binstead on the Isle of Wight in 1984.

In September 1985, Los Angeles County Superior Court Judge Edward Hinz, Jr., sentenced Vince Neil to 30 days in jail and five years probation.

Razzle's death was a turning point for Hanoi Rocks. Razzle was initially replaced by ex-Clash drummer Terry Chimes. Lead singer Michael Monroe gave the band notice early in 1985, and the group broke up in May after a farewell concert.

Neil dedicated Theatre of Pain, Mötley Crüe's third studio album, to Razzle. In 2015, Neil admitted to Ultimate Classic Rock that he paid US$2.5 million to the courts, so he served only 19 days of a 30-day sentence for the death. Neil's account of this event, which contradicts witness accounts, is documented in Mötley Crüe's collaborative autobiography The Dirt: Confessions of the World's Most Notorious Rock Band (2001).

Despite his short career, Razzle left an impact through his work with Hanoi Rocks, a band credited as a major influence on Guns N' Roses and other glam metal acts of the late '80s.

== Media portrayal ==
Max Milner portrayed Razzle in the 2019 film adaptation "The Dirt" of Mötley Crüe’s autobiography.

== Discography ==
=== With Hanoi Rocks ===
Studio albums

- Back to Mystery City (1983)
- Two Steps from the Move (1984)

Live albums

- All Those Wasted Years (1984) (+Video)
- The Nottingham Tapes (2008) (Video)

Compilation albums

- The Best of Hanoi Rocks (1985)
- Million Miles Away (1985)
- Dead by Christmas (1986)
- The Collection (1989)
- Up Around the Bend, Super Best (1989)
- Tracks from a Broken Dream (1990)
- Hanoi Rocks Story (1990)
- Strange Boys Play Weird Openings (4 cd) (1991)
- Lean on Me (1992)
- All Those Glamorous Years – Best of Hanoi Rocks & Michael Monroe (1996)
- Decadent, Dangerous, Delicious (2 cd) (2000)
- Kill City Kills (2000)
- Hanoi Rocks box set (4 cd) (2001)
- Up Around the Bend... The Definitive Collection (2 cd) (2004)
- Lightning Bar Blues – The Definitive Collection (6 cd) (2005)
- This One Is for Rock'n'Roll – The Best of Hanoi Rocks 1980–2008 (2 cd) (2008)
- Ripped Off – Odd Tracks & Demos (2 cd) (2010)
- Hanoi Rocks Sound Pack 26 (2010)
- Hanoi Rocks Parhaat (2011)
- The Johanna Years (3 cd) (2014)
- Strange Boys Box (5 cd/6lp) (2018)

=== With Fallen Angels ===
Studio albums

- Fallen Angels (1984)
