= Nasty Suicide =

Finnish guitarist (born 1963)

- Born: Jan-Markus Stenfors; 27 February 1963 (age 63); Sipoo, Finland
- Genres: Hard rock, glam metal, glam punk
- Occupation: Guitarist
- Years active: 1970s–present

Nasty Suicide (born Jan-Markus Stenfors on 27 February 1963), sometimes known as Nasty Homicide, is a Finnish guitarist. He is most famous for being one of the founding members of Hanoi Rocks and the group's rhythm guitarist between 1979 and 1985. Hanoi Rocks was a Finnish rock band that combined elements of punk, glam rock, rock and roll, and blues.

== Career ==
Before his tenure in Hanoi Rocks, Suicide played guitar in a Finnish punk band called Briard in the late 1970s.

Suicide was Hanoi Rocks' rhythm guitarist between 1979 and 1985. After the group's breakup in 1985, he and former bandmate McCoy recorded an acoustic album under the name The Suicide Twins which was released in 1986 and was titled Silver Missiles and Nightingales. At the same time, the pair started The Cherry Bombz, which included Timo Caltio on bass (later replaced by Dave Tregunna), Terry Chimes on drums, and singer Anita Chellemah. The Cherry Bombz released two EPs, The Cherry Bombz (1985) and House of Ecstasy (1986), as well as a live album, Coming Down Slow (1986).

In 1988, Suicide made a short appearance in Guns N' Roses' music video for "Paradise City". He also appeared on Hanoi Rocks frontman Michael Monroe's second solo album Not Fakin' It, released in 1989, as a co-writer and guitarist.

Suicide went on to form his own band, Cheap and Nasty, which was active from 1990 to 1994. They released two albums, Beautiful Disaster (1991) and Cool Talk Injection (1994).

Suicide was also a member of Monroe's band Demolition 23 in the early nineties, in which he replaced original guitarist Jay Hening. After the breakup of Demolition 23, Suicide recorded an album under his given name, titled Vinegar Blood, in 1996, which was released in Finland only.

=== Retirement, subsequent work, and return ===
Suicide retired from the rock scene in the mid-1990s and moved back to Finland (which was the reason why Demolition 23 broke up), where he finally finished high school. After graduating, he studied to become a pharmacist and currently works for a drug company in Finland. He made a few guest appearances with the reformed Hanoi Rocks in the 2000s. In August 2010, Suicide also played a show with Michael Monroe at Ankkarock Festival, replacing Steve Conte who had to cancel due to family reasons. Since then, he has made some guest appearances with Monroe's band.

In 2022, Nasty returned to music and formed the 7-piece Stenfors band. They played their debut invite-only show in the spring at On the Rocks in Helsinki and released their debut album Family Album in June of that year.
