= Andy J. Davies =

British musician, songwriter, and producer (born 1966)

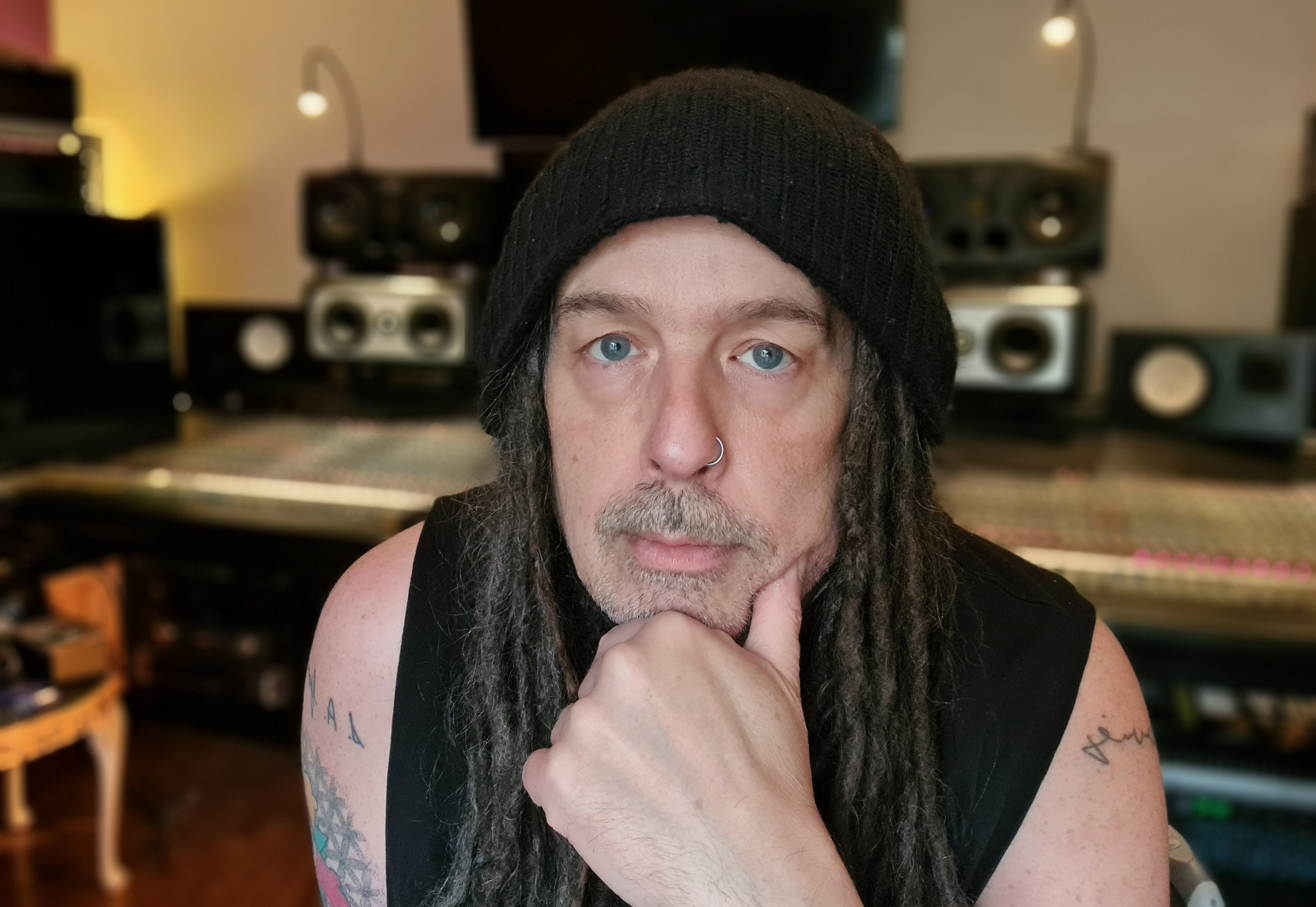
- Davies at Damage Recordings/The Analogue Room 2018

Background information
- Born: Andrew James Davies; March 22, 1966; Islington, London, England
- Died: December 7, 2025 (aged 59)
- Genres: Punk, Glam punk, metal, Hardcore punk, Post-hardcore, Hard rock, indie, Indie Rock, New Wave
- Occupations: Musician, songwriter, sound engineer, record producer, guitarist
- Instruments: guitar, bass, drums, vocals, keyboards
- Years active: 1984–20??

Andrew James "Andy J." Davies (22 March 1966 – 7 December 2025), was a British musician, songwriter, audio engineer, and record producer. He was a member and main songwriter of late 1980s glam punk band Soho Roses. He produced music for various bands, including SMASH. He was the co-founder and owner of Damajive Studios, co-owner of Earthworks Studios, and the founder and owner of the current studio and production companies The Analogue Room and Damage Recordings.

== Early years ==
Classically tutored from an early age, Davies formed his first band White Lie with school friends at age 12, and recorded for the first time at age 13 at The Crypt recording studio in Stevenage, UK. The band went on to enter and reach the regional finals of the TSB School Rock competition held at the Shaw Theatre Euston road in 1981. Later, the band morphed into The Gunrunners featuring guitarist (later of SMASH) Edward Borrie and Simon Coxhill, son of Jazz saxophonist Lol Coxhill. After the breakup of the band in 1986, Davies replied to an advertisement in Melody Maker and completed the lineup of London band The V2's which in 1987 became The Soho Roses.

== Damajive Studios ==
After a short career with Soho Roses in the late 80s, Davies opened Damajive Studios in Hitchin, Hertfordshire in 1991.

During this time, he recorded for numerous local bands, notably SMASH's Spring 1994 mini album, including the double A side "Lady, Love Your Cunt"/"Shame", King Rizla's seminal 1994 album Time For A New Day and the Guns n' Wankers LP For Dancing And Listening, released on Fat Wreck Chords. In 1995, due to SMASH's notoriety as an independent band, Shame appeared on the EMI compilation Unlaced. The studio remained open until 1996. While doing live sound at a local venue, he continued to record bands in his private analogue studio. He also produced Gilla Bruja's first two albums Tooth and Nail (2002) and Six Fingered Jesus (2003). He played bass at a number of shows with the band following the release of 6 Fingered Jesus. During this time, he also formed a post-punk hardcore band called Bad Head, singing and playing guitar.

== Earthworks Studios ==
In 2002, he was asked to become co-owner of the long-established London studio Earthworks. While there, Davies produced several notable and critically acclaimed records including The Freaks Union's 3rd Album Songs From Despair, Deadline's 4th album Take A Good Look (2006) and the studio tracks for their 5th album 'We're Taking Over', and The Mercury League's album La Libertad No Es Un Show. In 2006, Davies recorded UK black metal band Niroth's self titled album.

Also in 2006, he recorded vocals for the Paul Di'Anno album The Beast Live.

In 2007, Davies produced death metal band Corpsing's second album 'The Stench of Humanity' mixed and mastered in his private studio The Shed, which is where his analogue equipment was stored during his time at Earthworks. In 2008, the same system was used to produce Polish death metal band Diachronia's Chaos Eternal LP, as well as work on CJ & The Satellites' album Thirteen, The Metatrons' Patterns of Chaos album, and James and Alex Bay's Roadrunner's independently released self titled album among others.

In 2009, Davies produced Aghast!'s well-reviewed first EP Afterlife Crisis (which also appeared on a metal hammer CD). In 2009, Bad Head independently released a self-titled album. They subsequently played at the BBC Rhythms of The World festival in 2010. Davies parted company with Earthworks in 2011.

== The Analogue Room ==
In 2013, Davies restored his classic recording equipment and set up an entirely analogue studio. Over the next couple of years, the infrastructure and equipment in the studio were expanded and improved, including the acquisition of several vintage tape recorders and the integration of digital systems into the studio. During this time, Andy produced several notable recordings, including The Zipheads Prehistoric Beat (2013) album, Nick And The Sun Machine's album Wide Lying Smiles (2014) and The Metatrons "Please Mister / Not Today" (2014) single. In 2013, Davies produced the new SMASH mini album Spring '13, a reworking of material from their earlier collaborations, including an updated version of their hit single "(I Want To) Kill Somebody 2014" at the same time as recording the Without Regret mini album which he also produced and engineered.

== Damage Recordings ==
In 2016, Davies decided to expand from the analogue purist approach and return to a more modern recording ethos, while keeping the analogue facility intact and using hardware and software together in the form of Damage Recordings. The facility is complete and Davies was working on several projects. In this facility, he produced early demos for Dark Asphyxia's 2016 EP Executioner and subsequently, in 2018, their single 'Bury The Sun'. The first release from Davies' collaboration with ex Rubicon vocalist Andy Delany was released in the form of the first Delany album 'Mission Creep', followed by a few shows with the group around the UK in 2019. In 2018, Davies produced BrainPain, an EP by punk metal band HeadAche and 'Sex Dictator,' the first single for heavy rock band Dirty Ol' Crow. In 2019, he also recorded and produced the second Dirty 'Ol Crow single 'Johnny Boy' and their debut album 'Stranger's Nest.' 2019 also saw Davies remaster all of the Guns 'N' Wankers back catalogue for re release and record and produce the debut single for The Best Medicine, a heavy rock band featuring ex members of Aghast.

== Death ==
On the 10 December 2025, Andy's employer Club 85 announced on social media that he had died on Sunday 7 December. There was an outpouring of appreciation and love for Andy and what he had done for music locally, and in the UK on the post.

== Controversies ==
Davies' band Soho Roses was known as a rebellious glam punk act. After a gig supporting Teenage Idols at the Marquee Club in 1988, Steevi Jaimz of Tigertailz allegedly attempted to punch a member of the Soho Roses' entourage, triggering a notorious fight that resulted in Jaimz being ejected from the club. In a photograph taken by Ray Palmer used in an interview in "Metal Hammer" in November 1988, there is a copy of Guns N' Roses Appetite for Destruction LP featuring a prominent plastic dog turd, sparking a heated readers vs band debate in the next few issues of the magazine.

Davies worked closely with the band Guns n' Wankers, featuring ex-members of Soho Roses. The band's name was a blatant reference to their dislike of the LA glam metal scene demonstrated in the classic "Metal Hammer" interview.

Although correctly credited on the independent pressings, Davies' work on SMASH's Spring 1994 mini album and "Lady Love Your Cunt" /"Shame 7" single was misquoted on the UK pressing on Virgin's Hi-Rise Recordings label due to a clerical error. However, Davies was correctly credited on the U.S. Hut Recordings release and all subsequent reissues of the material.
