= List of glam punk artists =

A list of musical acts who belong to the glam punk subgenre of glam rock and protopunk music.

== Glitter punk roots: 1968–1979 ==
- Alice Cooper
- The Arrows
- Cherry Vanilla
- Cuddly Toys
- David Bowie
- Doctors of Madness
- Hollywood Brats
- Iggy Pop
- Japan (early)
- Jayne County
- Jet
- Johnny Thunders
- Lou Reed
- Magic Tramps
- Milk 'N' Cookies
- Misspent Youth
- New York Dolls
- Ruby and the Rednecks
- The Runaways
- Sensational Alex Harvey Band
- Slaughter & The Dogs
- Sparks
- The Stooges (1971–1974)
- T. Rex
- Ultravox
- Zolar X

== Glam punk aftermath: 1980–present ==
1980s

- Andy McCoy
- Backyard Babies
- The Dogs D'Amour
- Factory (band)
- Faster Pussycat
- Hanoi Rocks
- Jetboy
- Joan Jett & the Blackhearts
- The Joneses
- The Lords of the New Church
- Michael Monroe
- Redd Kross (later)
- René Berg
- The Throbs
- Mother Love Bone
- Smack
- Soho Roses
- The Suicide Twins
- The 69 Eyes (early)

1990s

- D Generation
- Frankenstein Drag Queens from Planet 13
- Manic Street Preachers
- Pure Rubbish
- Shooting Gallery
- Toilet Böys
- Turbonegro

2000–present

- Billy Boy on Poison
- Biters
- The Exploding Hearts
- The Featherz
- The Heart Attacks
- Prima Donna
- Sister
- Towers of London

== See also ==
- List of glam rock artists
