= Four by Four =

Studio album by Backyard Babies
- Released: 28 August 2015
- Genres: Hard rock, glam punk
- Length: 33:44
- Label: Gain Music Entertainment/Sony Music
- Producer: Jacob Hellner

Backyard Babies chronology
Them XX (2009)	Four by Four (2015)	Sliver & Gold (2019)

Four by Four is the seventh studio album by the Swedish rock band Backyard Babies, released on 28 August 2015 by Gain Music Entertainment. It was the band's first studio album in seven years, following a five-year hiatus that ended in 2014. The album reached number 2 on the Swedish albums chart.

== Reception ==
The album received generally favorable reviews, with both Punk Rock Theory and Ghost Cult magazine praising the band for picking up where they left of seven years before. Mixed reviews came from Sleaze Roxx, which criticized the album's focus on pop-punk as opposed to the band's heavier sound on previous albums, while Pure Rawk disdained the album's attempts at ballads and bluesy rock songs. However, MyGlobalMind praised the album's occasional experiments with new sounds and concluded that the band developed a more mature style during their recent hiatus.

== Track listing ==
No.	Title	Length
1.	"Th1rt3en or Nothing"	3:45
2.	"I'm on My Way to Save Your Rock 'N' Roll"	2:49
3.	"White Light District"	3:22
4.	"Bloody Tears"	3:44
5.	"Piracy"	3:09
6.	"Never Finish Anythi"	3:37
7.	"Mirrors (Shall Be Broken)"	3:21
8.	"Wasted Years"	2:52
9.	"Walls"	7:05
Total length:		33:44

== Personnel ==
- Nicke Borg – vocals, guitar
- Dregen – lead guitar, vocals
- Johan Blomqvist – bass
- Peder Carlsson – drums
