= Backyard Babies (disambiguation) =

Backyard Babies are a punk rock band from Nässjö, Sweden.

Backyard Babies may also refer to:

- Backyard Babies (1990 album)
- Backyard Babies (2008 album)
