= Nicke Borg =

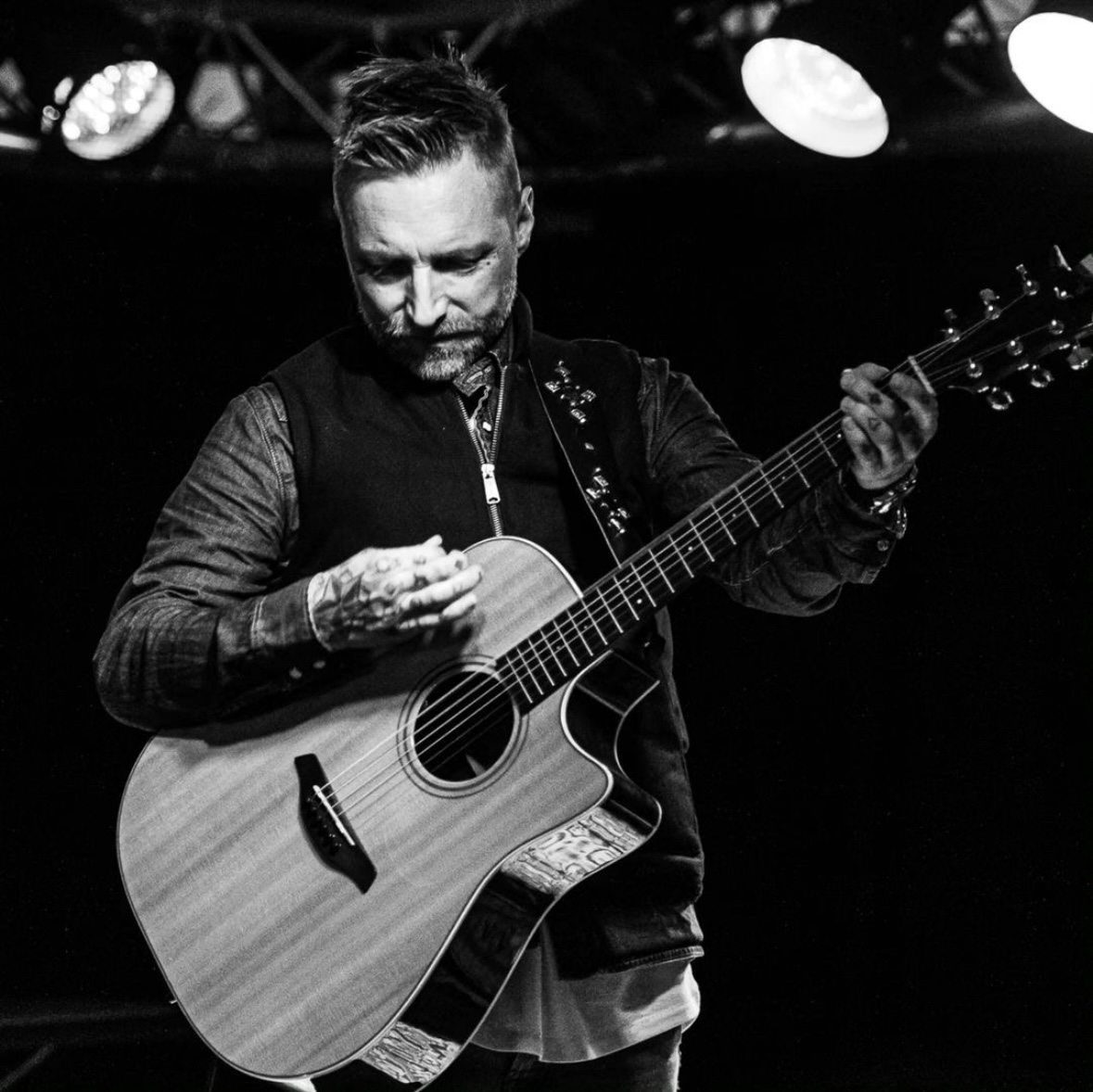

Background information
- Also known as: Nicke Borg
- Born: Niklas Roger Borg; 3 April 1973 (age 52); Nässjö, Jönköpings län
- Genres: Garage rock, punk rock, glam punk, glam metal
- Occupations: Musician, songwriter
- Instruments: Vocals, guitar
- Years active: 1989–present
- Labels: Psychout Records, BMG, Liquor & Poker, MVG Records, RCA Records, White Jazz Records, Lookout! Records, Infernal Records, JuJu Records

Niklas Roger "Nicke" Borg (born 3 April 1973) is a Swedish musician and songwriter, best known as the frontman and rhythm guitarist of the rock band Backyard Babies.

== Career ==
Borg was born in Nässjö. He joined Backyard Babies, a Swedish rock band, in 1989 as lead vocalist and rhythm guitarist. The band was originally formed in 1987 under the name Tyrant with bassist Tobbe (Tobias Fischer) as lead vocals and guitarist Dregen, guitarist Johan Blomqvist, and drummer Peder Carlsson. Borg replaced Tobbe as frontman two years after the formation of the band. Blomqvist switched to bass at the same time. Over the years, they have released eight studio albums and won a Swedish Grammy.

== Nicke Borg Homeland ==
While Backyard Babies was on a hiatus in the early 2010s, Borg worked on his solo project Nicke Borg Homeland. Homeland released the EP Chapter 1 in 2010, followed by their debut studio album, Chapter 2, in 2011. The band released their second studio album, Ruins of a Riot, in 2013 and their first live album, Chapter 3, in 2014.

== Melodifestivalen ==
Borg participated in Melodifestivalen 2011, the competition that determines Sweden's representative in the Eurovision Song Contest, where he placed second in the fourth heat with the song "Leaving Home" and qualified for the final at the Stockholm Globe Arena. The song was co-written by Borg with Jojo Borg Larsson, Fredrik Thomander and Anders "Gary" Wikström. In the final, he finished eight among the ten finalists.

== In popular culture ==
Borg is one of the characters in the book Sex Tips from Rock Stars by Paul Miles published by Omnibus Press in July 2010.

Borg hosts his own radio show on the Swedish radio station Rock Klassiker. The radio show broadcasts from 9:00 to 14:00 every weekday.

== Discography ==
=== With Backyard Babies ===
Year	Title	Peak positions	
Year	Title	SWE	FIN
1994	Diesel & Power	—	—
1998	Total 13	12	—
2001	Making Enemies Is Good	1	13
2003	Stockholm Syndrome	2	—
2006	People Like People Like People Like Us	3	22
2008	Backyard Babies	1	31
2015	Four by Four	2	17
2019	Sliver & Gold	5	31

=== With Nicke Borg Homeland ===
Year	Title	Peak positions
Year	Title	SWE
2010	Chapter 1 (EP)	–
2011	Chapter 2	26
2013	Ruins of a Riot	16
2014	Chapter 3 (Live In The Studio)	–

=== Solo ===
Year	Title	Peak positions
Year	Title	SWE
2011	"Leaving Home"	11
