= Stockholm Syndrome (Backyard Babies album) =

Studio album by Backyard Babies
- Released: 2003
- Recorded: Studio 301, Stockholm
- Genre: Hard rock, glam punk
- Length: 37:34
- Label: BMG Sweden AB
- Producer: Joe Barresi

Backyard Babies chronology
Making Enemies Is Good (2001)	Stockholm Syndrome (2003)	Live Live in Paris (2005)

Professional ratings
Review scores
Source	Rating
Metal Rules	4/5 stars

Stockholm Syndrome is an album by Backyard Babies, released in 2003. The album was produced by Joe Barresi and features several guest musicians, including members of the Ramones, Hanoi Rocks. Danko Jones, Dogs D'Amour, The Cardigans, Warrior Soul, The Dictators, Hanoi Rocks, Mad Juana, Turbonegro, L7, Halfcocked, Tuscaurora, the Dwarves, Infinite Mass, The Hellacopters and The Nomads.

== Track listing ==
All tracks are written by Backyard Babies, except where noted.

No.	Title	Writer(s)	Length
1.	"Everybody Ready?!"		3:06
2.	"Earn the Crown"		3:53
3.	"A Song for the Outcast"		3:49
4.	"Minus Celsius"		3:35
5.	"Pigs for Swine"		3:06
6.	"One Sound"		3:33
7.	"Say When"		2:32
8.	"Year by Year"		3:53
9.	"Friends"	Nicke Borg, Michael Monroe, Danko Jones, Tyla, Joey Ramone, Nina Persson, Kory Clarke	2:49
10.	"Be Myself and I"		3:40
11.	"You Tell Me You Love Me You Lie"		3:35

Bonus tracks
No.	Title	Length
12.	"Big Bad Wolf"	3:06
13.	"Shut the Fuck Up"	2:44

== Personnel ==
Backyard Babies

- Nicke Borg – lead vocals, guitar
- Dregen – lead guitar, vocals, percussion
- Johan Blomqvist – bass guitar
- Peder Carlsson – drums, backing vocals, percussion

Special guests

The song "Friends" features an all-star line-up of special guests, including;

- Joey Ramone (Ramones)
- Michael Monroe (Hanoi Rocks)
- Danko Jones (Danko Jones)
- Tyla (Dogs D'Amour)
- Nina Persson (The Cardigans)
- Kory Clarke (Warrior Soul)
- Andy Shernoff (The Dictators)
- Top Ten (The Dictators)
- Sami Yaffa (Hanoi Rocks)
- T.P.
- Karmen Guy (Mad Juana)
- Euroboy (Turbonegro)
- Happy Tom (Turbonegro)
- Chris Summers (Turbonegro)
- Corey Shields (Danko Jones)
- Damon Richardson (Danko Jones)
- Janis Tanaka (L7)
- Donita Sparks (L7)
- Suzi Gardner (L7)
- TC
- Jennifer Finch (L7)
- Sarah Reitkopp (Halfcocked)
- Anne Kadrovich-Johnson (Tuscaurora)
- Blag Dahlia (The Dwarves)
- Amir Chamdin (Infinite Mass)
- Rodde Pencheff (Infinite Mass)
- Nicke Andersson (The Hellacopters)
- Björne Fröberg (The Nomads)
