= People Like People Like People Like Us =

Studio album by Backyard Babies
- Released: 2006
- Genre: Hard rock, glam punk
- Length: 38:37
- Label: BMG Sweden AB
- Producer: Nicke Andersson

Backyard Babies chronology
Live Live in Paris (2005)	People Like People Like People Like Us (2006)	Backyard Babies (2008)

Professional ratings
Review scores
Source	Rating
PiercingMetal	link
AllMusic	link

People Like People Like People Like Us is the fifth studio album by the Swedish rock band Backyard Babies, released in 2006. It was produced by Nicke Andersson from The Hellacopters. Videos were made for the songs "The Mess Age (How Could I Be So Wrong)", "Dysfunctional Professional" and "Roads".

== Track listing ==
All tracks are written by Backyard Babies, except where noted.

No.	Title	Writer(s)	Length
1.	"People Like People Like People Like Us"		2:00
2.	"Cockblocker Blues"		3:35
3.	"Dysfunctional Professional"		3:34
4.	"We Go a Long Way Back"		3:10
5.	"Roads"		4:23
6.	"Blitzkrieg Loveshock"		3:08
7.	"The Mess Age (How Could I Be So Wrong)"		3:30
8.	"I Got Spades"		3:03
9.	"Hold 'em Down"		2:49
10.	"Heroes & Heroines"		2:55
11.	"You Cannot Win"	Nicke Andersson	3:34
12.	"Things to Do Before We Die"		2:54
Total length:			38:37

== Personnel ==
- Nicke Borg – Vocals, guitar
- Dregen – Lead guitar, vocals
- Johan Blomqvist – Bass
- Peder Carlsson – Drums
- Nicke Andersson – Production, backing vocals, percussion and lead guitar on "Roads"
- Ant McMahon – Voice on "People Like People Like People Like Us"
