= Supershit 666 =

European rock supergroup

Supershit666
- Genres: Rock and roll, garage rock
- Labels: Razzia Records
- Members: Nick Royale; Dregen; Ginger; Thomas Skogsberg

Supershit 666 or Super$hit 666 were a European rock supergroup consisting of Ginger from The Wildhearts on vocals and guitar, Nicke Andersson from the Hellacopters on vocals and drums, Dregen from the Backyard Babies on vocals and guitar, and Swedish producer Thomas Skogsberg on bass.

The only Supershit 666 release was an eponymous 6-track EP on Inferno Records released in 1999. They have never played any gigs, and a minimum of rehearsing and recording time was used for the record. The EP can be compared to the 1996 Hellacopters album Supershitty to the Max!.

Although both Ginger and Dregen have repeatedly said in interviews they would like to record and perhaps tour under the Supershit 666 name again, due to the hectic schedules of all artists involved no firm plans have been made.

== Supershit 666 EP ==
=== Track listing ===
No.	Title	Length
1.	"Wire Out"	1:36
2.	"Fast One"	3:31
3.	"Dangermind"	3:51
4.	"You Smell Canadian"	3:36
5.	"Star War Jr."	3:03
6.	"Crank It Up!"	2:46

"Star War Jr." is an alternate version of the song "Star War" from the 2001 album Making Enemies Is Good by Backyard Babies. The song was originally intended as the lead track on a solo single by Dregen which was to be part of a series of solo singles released by the members of the Hellacopters as a homage to their heroes KISS. "Crank It Up" is a cover of a song by the 1980s American heavy metal band The Rods. The EP also features backing vocals by and Nicke Borg of Backyard Babies and Chris McCormack of 3 Colours Red, and harmonica by Backyard babies drummer Peder Carlsson.
