= Leaving Home =

Leaving Home may refer to:

- Leaving Home – the Life & Music of Indian Ocean, a 2010 Indian documentary
- Leaving Home (play), a 1972 play by David French
- Leaving Home: A Collection of Lake Wobegon Stories, a 1987 story collection by Garrison Keillor
- Leaving Home: The Therapy of Disturbed Young People, a 1997 book by Jay Haley
- "Leaving Home" (Jebediah song), 1997
- "Leaving Home" (Nicke Borg song), 2011
- Leaving Home EP, a 2012 EP by T. Mills
- Leaving the nest, the act of moving out of one's parental home
