= Total 13 =

Studio album by Backyard Babies
- Released: 1998
- Recorded: Decibel, MNW and MWG Studios; "U.F.O. Romeo" at Sunlight Studio
- Genres: Glam punk, hard rock
- Labels: Scooch Pooch, PWL, MVG
- Producer: Thomas Skogsberg

Backyard Babies chronology
Diesel & Power (1994)	Total 13 (1998)	Making Enemies Is Good (2001)

Professional ratings
Review scores
Source	Rating
AllMusic	link
Stereo & Video	3/5 stars

Total 13 is the second album by the Swedish rock band Backyard Babies. It was released in 1998 and produced by Thomas Skogsberg.

== Track listing ==
All tracks are written by Nicke Borg and Dregen, except where noted.

No.	Title	Writer(s)	Length
1.	"Made Me Madman"	Dregen, Nicke Borg, Johan Blomqvist	2:23
2.	"U.F.O. Romeo"		2:44
3.	"Highlights"		3:47
4.	"Get Dead"		3:05
5.	"Look at You"		2:44
6.	"Let's Go to Hell"	Borg	3:13
7.	"Spotlight the Sun"		2:59
8.	"8-Balled"	Borg, Dregen, Nicke Andersson	2:43
9.	"Ghetto You"		3:26
10.	"Subculture Hero"	Borg, Andersson, Dregen	3:00
11.	"Bombed (Out of My Mind)"	Borg, Dregen, Peder Carlsson	2:55
12.	"Hey, I'm Sorry"	Dregen, Carlsson	2:58
13.	"Robber of Life"		3:21

International vinyl bonus track
No.	Title	Length
14.	"Backstabber"	2:44

Japanese edition bonus tracks
No.	Title	Length
14.	"Powderhead"	3:29
15.	"Can't Find the Door"	3:40
16.	"Wireless Mind"	4:06
17.	"Rocker" (featuring Michael Monroe)	2:43

Special edition bonus track
No.	Title	Length
14.	"Babylon"	3:04
