= Dregen =

Swedish guitarist

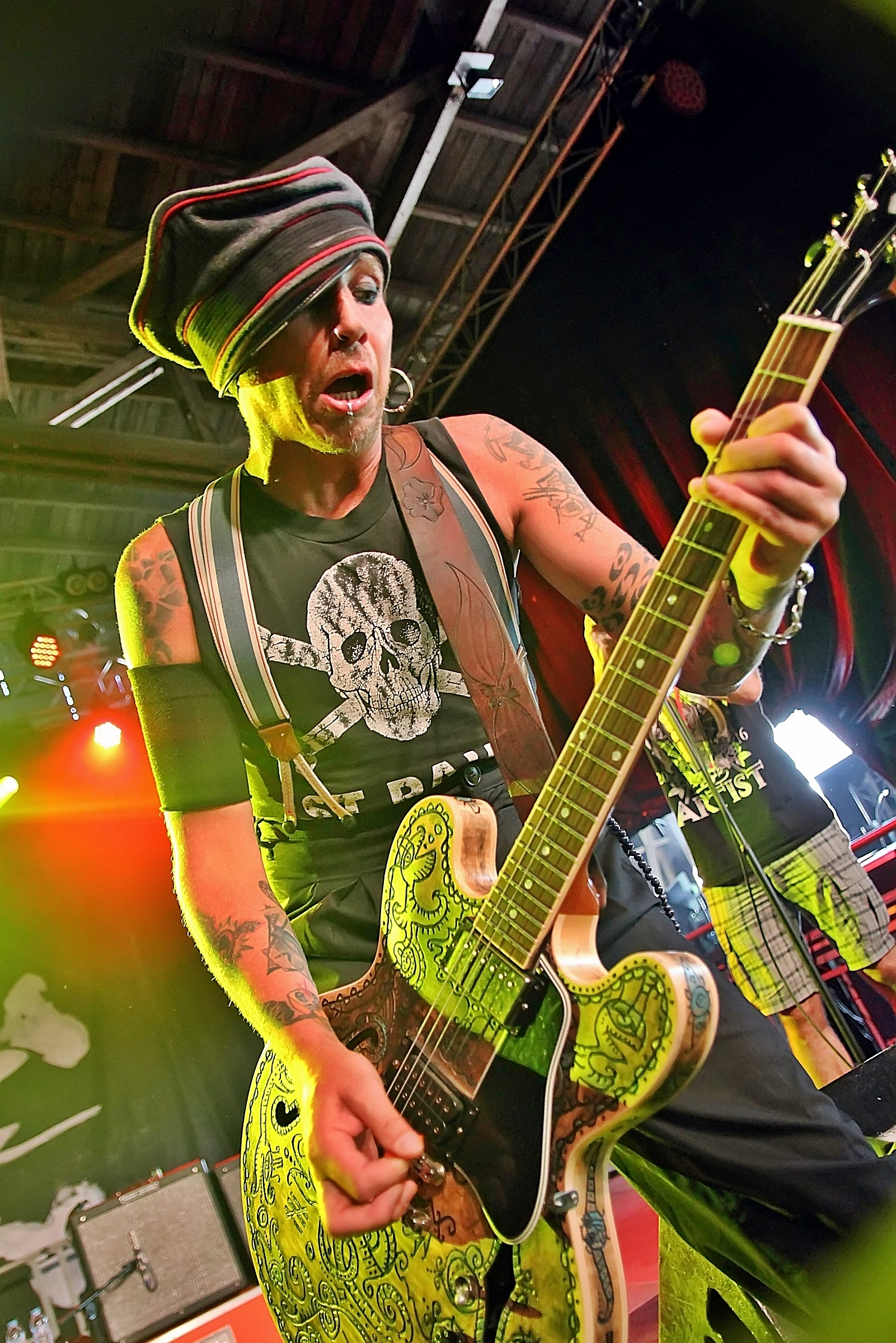
- Dregen performing in 2018

Background information
- Also known as: Dregen, Dregen Hellacopter, Åsk Dregen, Jerry Lee Hellacopter, Sue Ellen
- Born: Andreas Tyrone Svensson; 12 June 1973 (age 53)
- Genres: Garage rock, punk rock, glam punk, glam rock, hard rock, glam metal
- Occupation: Guitarist
- Years active: 1987–present
- Member of: Backyard Babies; The Hellacopters

Dregen (born Andreas Tyrone Svensson; 12 June 1973) is a Swedish musician best known as the guitarist of The Hellacopters and Backyard Babies. From 2011 to 2014, he was also a member of Michael Monroe's solo band.

Dregen is a founding member of Backyard Babies, whom he helped form in 1987. The band announced the start of an indefinite hiatus beginning in 2010. During this hiatus, Dregen released a personal autobiography, followed by his first solo record in September 2013. After a five-year absence, Backyard Babies returned in 2015, going on to release Four by Four later that summer.

== Career ==
Dregen formed rock band Backyard Babies in 1987 with his childhood friends Tobias Fischer, Peder Carlsson and Johan Blomqvist in their hometown of Nässjö. The band later moved to Stockholm to pursue wider success. The group signed a record deal and released their debut album Diesel & Power in 1994.

Also in 1994, Dregen met singer and guitarist Nicke Andersson who at that time played drums with Swedish death metal outfit Entombed. Together they formed another band, The Hellacopters. The band found success in 1996 with their album Supershitty to the Max!, which won a Swedish Grammis award. It was followed in 1997 by the record Payin' the Dues. The band also toured with Kiss. That same year, Backyard Babies released their sophomore and Grammis-winning album Total 13.

By the end of the 1990s, Dregen decided to leave The Hellacopters and subsequently focused on recording and performing with Backyard Babies.

The album Making Enemies Is Good was released in 2001, and Backyard Babies were awarded a second Grammis award. They toured the world several times and opened for AC/DC during a European tour. Since then, the band have released a number of EPs, singles and albums such as Stockholm Syndrome, People Like People Like People Like Us, Backyard Babies and Them XX. The latter resulted in an anniversary tour in 2010, following which the band announced an indefinite hiatus.

In May 2011, Dregen joined former-Hanoi Rocks frontman Michael Monroe. Monroe, writing on his website, said

Dregen is the perfect choice for this band. We are a group of very strong individuals and we really needed a great personality as a guitar player. Dregen has the whole package together – he's a killer guitarist, a brilliant showman, looks great and has the right kind of attitude and taste in music. I feel very glad and lucky that he was willing and able to join us. Dregen is a real star and a true rocker at heart. I can't wait to start rockin' out with him in the band!

As of July 2011, Dregen was working on his first solo album. The album, titled Dregen, was released on 25 September 2013. In 2016, Dregen reunited with The Hellacopters for the 20th anniversary of their debut album. In 2022, the band released their first album in 16 years, Eyes of Oblivion. In September 2026, it was officially announced that The Hellacopters and Dregen part ways due to the latter's hand injury.

== Personal life ==
Dregen was formerly married to fellow Swedish singer Pernilla Andersson, who is also the mother of their first child, a son named Sixten. The couple announced their separation on 1 June 2015.

== Equipment ==
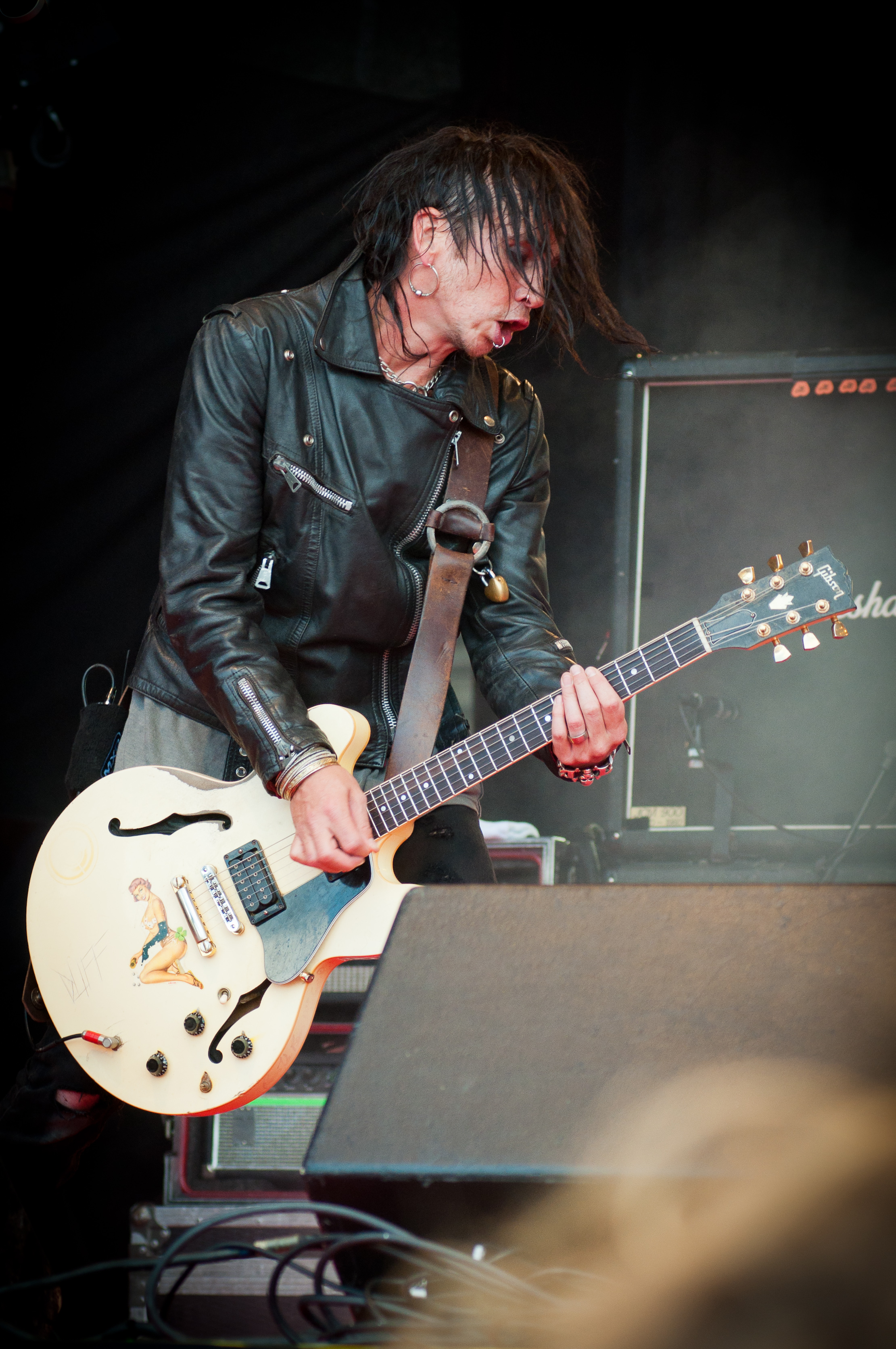
Dregen at the 2011 Ilosaarirock festival

Guitars

- Gibson ES-335 – Goldtop finish and Classic 57 bridge and neck pickups.
- Gibson ES-335 – Cream white finish, Lundgren bridge pickup and Classic 57 neck pickup.
- Gibson ES-335 – Black finish, DiMarzio Super Distortion bridge pickup and Classic 57 neck pickup.
- Sundberg S-J2 acoustic – Luthier-built with custom skull inlays.

Effects

- Jim Dunlop Cry Baby
- MXR MC-401 Boost

Amplifiers

- Fender Super Sonic Heads through 4x12" Fender cabinets – Used live since 2009.
- Fender Bassman heads modified by Tommy Folkesson through 4x12 Marshall cabinets – Used live until 2009.
- Fender Prosonic – Used during later studio recordings.
- Orange TH30 head and Orange PPC212V cabinets - Used since 2021

== Selected discography ==
- 1994 Backyard Babies – Diesel & Power (Guitar, backing vocals)
- 1996 The Hellacopters – Supershitty to the Max! (Guitar, vocals)
- 1997 The Hellacopters – Payin' the Dues (Guitar, backing vocals)
- 1998 Backyard Babies – Total 13 (Guitar, backing vocals)
- 1999 Supershit 666 – Supershit666 (Guitar, vocals)
- 2001 Backyard Babies – Making Enemies Is Good (Guitar, backing vocals)
- 2001 Infinite Mass – Bullet (Guitar)
- 2003 Backyard Babies – Stockholm Syndrome (Guitar, backing vocals)
- 2003 Wilmer X – Lyckliga Hundar (Guitar, backing vocals)
- 2004 Kurt-Sunes Med Helveteshundarna – (Komma Ut Ur Machen) Nu! (Guitar)
- 2004 Dregen and Tyla – The Poet & The Dragon (Guitar)
- 2004 Urrke T & Midlife Crisis – Ask Not What You Can Do for Your Country... (Guitar)
- 2006 Backyard Babies – People Like People Like People Like Us (Guitar, backing vocals)
- 2008 Backyard Babies – Backyard Babies (Guitar, backing vocals)
- 2008 Timbuktu – Tack för kaffet (Guitar, vocals)
- 2010 Imperial State Electric – Imperial State Electric (Guitar, backing vocals)
- 2011 Märvel – Warhawks Of War (Guest guitar)
- 2013 Dregen – Dregen (Guitar, vocals)
- 2013 Michael Monroe – Horns and Halos (Guitar, backing vocals)
- 2015 Backyard Babies – Four By Four (Guitar, backing vocals)
- 2019 Backyard Babies – Sliver & Gold (Guitar, backing vocals)
- 2022 The Hellacopters – Eyes of Oblivion (Guitar, backing vocals)
