= Guns n' Wankers =

Punk rock band

Guns 'N' Wankers
- Origin: England
- Genre: Punk rock
- Years active: 1991–1994, 2019–present
- Label: Rugger Bugger/Fat Wreck Chords
- Members: Duncan Redmonds; Pat Walters; Wes Wasley
- Past members: Joolz Dean

Guns 'N' Wankers is an English punk rock band formed by ex-members of Snuff and The Wildhearts in the early 1990s. The band consisted of Duncan Redmonds (vocals, guitar), Pat Walters (drums, vocals) and Joolz Dean (bass guitar, vocals). The three formed the band on the same day Snuff played their farewell gig at the Kilburn National and Walters was relieved of duty with The Wildhearts. On the off chance, Duncan gave Walters a call, having seen him play in a band called The Milk Monitors a few years before. Walters called his friend Joolz Dean (Pat and Joolz had played in an early incarnation of The Wildhearts and before that in London glam punk act Soho Roses) and the line-up was complete.

After touring the United Kingdom with Leatherface, NOFX and Wat Tyler, the band set about recording demos. This coincided with a tour of the Basque region in Spain, where copies of the demos sold well. On their return, Sean of Wat Tyler, the man behind Rugger Bugger Records, put up the modest money to record a Guns 'N' Wankers album, which was recorded and produced by Andy J. Davies in Hitchin, Herts. The recordings were originally released on Rugger Bugger Records as three 7-inch EPs: Hardcore, Pop and Metal. An album compiling the EPs followed later that year, omitting the track "Evergreen" from Metal. NOFX's Fat Mike released an eight-track album version of the album without the material from Metal, called For Dancing And Listening, on his label Fat Wreck Chords. The song "Skin Deep" appeared on the 1994 Fat Wreck Chords compilation album Fat Music for Fat People. Another EP, Silly, a limited edition split with Solid Gold Hell, Chug and David Kilgour, came free with an issue of Fear & Loathing fanzine, also in 1994.

The band split due to the reformation of Snuff. Pat Walters went on to play with singer-songwriter Marc Carroll in a band called The Hormones and Joolz formed punk band Dogpiss. They reformed in 2019 with original members Redmonds and Walters, joined by Wes Wasley of Consumed on bass. In the same year, they self-released a compilation of all their material, Pop - Hardcore - Metal - Silly (The Complete Recordings '93-'94).

== Discography ==
Release	Year
Pop 7-inch - "Help" / "Skin Deep" / "Raise Your Glass" / "Sunstroke"	1994
Metal 7-inch - "668" / "Evergreen" / "Incoming"	1994
Hardcore 7-inch - "Nervous" / "Blown Away" / "Blah Blah Blah" / "Surprise"	1994
Silly 7-inch (split single free with ‘Fear and Loathing’ fanzine Vol.27 Sept. 94) Side A: "Gillette" / "Bing Bong"	1994
G ‘N ‘W (Guns ‘N’ Wankers) 10-track UK CD on Rugger Bugger Records (SEEP008)	1994
For Dancing and Listening 8-track US CDEP/12" on Fat Wreck Chords (FAT519)	1994
Pop - Hardcore - Metal - Silly (The Complete Recordings '93-'94) 13-track 12-inch	2019
