= Sliver & Gold =

Studio album by Backyard Babies
- Released: 1 March 2019
- Genre: Hard rock
- Length: 55:26
- Label: Gain Music Entertainment/Sony Music

Backyard Babies chronology
Four by Four (2015)	Sliver & Gold (2019)

Sliver & Gold is the eighth studio album by the Swedish rock band Backyard Babies, released on March 1, 2019 by Gain Music Entertainment. The band cite it as their most cohesive record to date.

On the Internet, many references mangle the name of the album by changing the first word to "Silver".

== Reception ==
The album received generally favorable reviews, with notice from Metal Temple, Metal Report, Rock Report, and Metal Hammer.

== Track listing ==
No.	Title	Length
1.	"Good Morning Midnight"	2:58
2.	"Simple Being Sold"	2:49
3.	"Shovin' Rocks"	3:19
4.	"Ragged Flag"	3:19
5.	"Yes to All No"	3:08
6.	"Bad Seeds"	3:48
7.	"44 Undead"	3:23
8.	"Sliver & Gold"	3:14
9.	"A Day Late in My Dollar Shorts"	2:47
10.	"Laugh Now Cry Later"	6:15
11.	"Th1rt3en or Nothing (Acoustic Version - Live Studio)"	3:58
12.	"A Song for the Outcast (Acoustic Version - Live Studio)"	4:11
13.	"Highlights (Acoustic Version - Live Studio)"	3:27
14.	"Star War (Acoustic Version - Live Studio)"	3:20
15.	"Nomadic (Acoustic Version - Live Studio)"	4:21
Total length:		55:26

== Personnel ==
- Nicke Borg – vocals, guitar
- Dregen – lead guitar, vocals
- Johan Blomqvist – bass
- Peder Carlsson – drums

This time the band joined forces under a shorter amount of time and wrote the most intense and furious album to date with accurate lyrics and trademark riffs.

— Nicke Borg

After all these years touring and making music together, we still love what we do. And still we find new ways musically. Sliver & Gold sounds like classic Backyard Babies but with a total new set of spices. And they are damn hot!

— Dregen
