= Backyard Babies (2008 album) =

Studio album by Backyard Babies
- Released: 2008
- Recorded: Big Island Sound, Stockholm, Studio Replokal, Solna, Sweden
- Genre: Hard rock, glam punk
- Length: 44:37
- Label: BMG Sweden AB
- Producer: Jacob Hellner

Backyard Babies chronology
People Like People Like People Like Us (2006)	Backyard Babies (2008)	Them XX (2009)

Backyard Babies is the sixth studio album by the Swedish rock band Backyard Babies. The album was released on 13 August 2008 and reached number 1 on the Swedish albums chart, and debuted on the UK rock chart at number 29.

== Recording ==
The album was recorded in the beginning of 2008 during 90 intensive days. It was produced by Swedish producer Jacob Hellner, who also worked with Rammstein and Apocalyptica.

== Singles ==
The first single from the album was "Fuck Off and Die" and a video was made for the song. "Degenerated" was the second single by the band, and an animated music video was made for the song. "Nomadic" is the third single for the album.

== Track listing ==
All tracks are written by Backyard Babies, except where noted.

No.	Title	Writer(s)	Length
1.	"Fuck Off and Die"		3:48
2.	"Degenerated"		3:39
3.	"Come Undone"		3:41
4.	"Drool"		3:25
5.	"Abandon"	Backyard Babies, Fredrik Thomander, Anders Wikström	4:21
6.	"Voodoo Love Bow"		3:23
7.	"Idiots"		3:07
8.	"The Ship"		3:08
9.	"Nomadic"	Backyard Babies, Thomander, Wikström	3:51
10.	"Back on the Juice"		3:37
11.	"Where Were You?"		3:19
12.	"Zoe Is a Weirdo"		1:55
13.	"Saved by the Bell"		3:55
Total length:			44:37

== Personnel ==
- Nicke Borg – vocals, guitar
- Dregen – lead guitar, vocals
- Johan Blomqvist – bass
- Peder Carlsson – drums
