= Making Enemies Is Good =

Studio album by Backyard Babies
- Released: 2001
- Recorded: Great Linford Manor, Milton Keynes, UK; Megaphon Studios, Stockholm, Sweden; MVG Studios, Stockholm; AKM Studio, Vaxholm, Sweden.
- Genre: Hard rock, glam punk
- Length: 42:11
- Label: RCA/BMG
- Producer: Thomas Skogsberg & Backyard Babies

Backyard Babies chronology
Total 13 (1998)	Making Enemies Is Good (2001)	Stockholm Syndrome (2003)

Professional ratings
Review scores
Source	Rating
AllMusic	4/5 stars
Kerrang!	4/5 stars
Metal Rules	5/5 stars

Making Enemies Is Good is an album by Backyard Babies, released in 2001. The album includes the band's hit songs "The Clash" and "Brand New Hate". Making Enemies Is Good was produced by Thomas Skogsberg, who also contributed a keyboard solo to the song "Colours".

== Track listing ==
All tracks are written by Backyard Babies, except where noted.

No.	Title	Writer(s)	Length
1.	"I Love to Roll"		2:04
2.	"Payback"		3:04
3.	"Brand New Hate"	Backyard Babies, Ginger	3:01
4.	"Colours"		4:49
5.	"Star War"		3:06
6.	"The Clash"	Backyard Babies, Fredrik Thomander, Anders Wikström	3:06
7.	"My Demonic Side"		3:36
8.	"The Kids Are Right"		2:57
9.	"Ex-Files"		3:36
10.	"Heaven 2.9"		2:50
11.	"Too Tough to Make Some Friends"		2:17
12.	"Painkiller"	Backyard Babies, Tyla	5:33
13.	"Bigger W/A Trigger"		2:06
Total length:			42:11

== Personnel ==
Backyard Babies

- Nicke Borg – lead vocals, guitar
- Dregen – guitar, backing vocals, lead vocals on "Star War"
- Johan Blomqvist – bass guitar
- Peder Carlsson – drums

== Charts ==
=== Weekly charts ===
Chart (2001)	Peak position
Finnish Albums (Suomen virallinen lista)	13
German Albums (Offizielle Top 100)	82
Swedish Albums (Sverigetopplistan)	1

=== Year-end charts ===
Chart (2001)	Position
Swedish Albums (Sverigetopplistan)	72

== Certifications ==
Region	Certification	Certified units/sales
Sweden (GLF)	Gold	40,000^{^}
^{^} Shipments figures based on certification alone.
