= Marc Carroll =

Irish musician (born 1972)

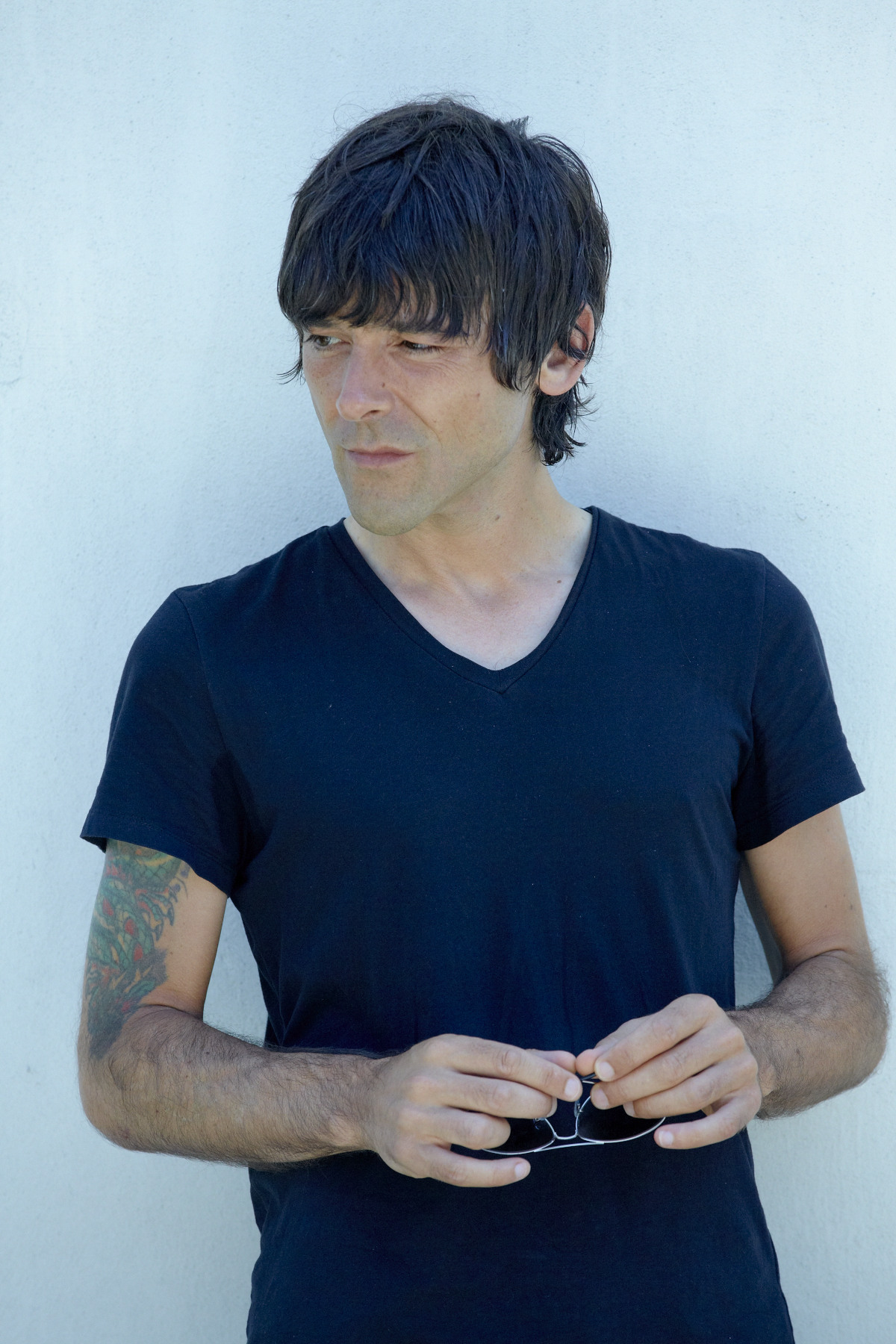
- Marc Carroll, Los Angeles 2013

Background information
- Born: 25 January 1972 (age 54); Dublin, Ireland
- Genres: Folk rock, alternative rock, instrumental
- Occupations: Songwriter, musician, multi-instrumentalist
- Instruments: Vocals, guitar, bass guitar, keyboard, piano, percussion
- Years active: 1989–present
- Labels: One Little Indian, Rough Trade, Trade2/Island, V2, Universal Music, Evangeline Recorded Works, High Noon, Excellent (Japan)
- Website: www.marccarroll.com

Marc Carroll (born 25 January 1972) is an Irish musician, songwriter and multi-instrumentalist. He has released 13 albums. He is currently signed to One Little Indian Records, who released his most recent studio album, Love Is All Or Love Is Not At All on 6 November 2015. The label also released remastered and expanded editions of his first 4 albums in February 2014. He has received considerable critical acclaim for his recorded output but has never reached any significant level of mainstream success. The Irish Times newspaper have called him "One of Ireland's great lost songwriters, touched by genius and whose dealings with the music industry have become the stuff of legend", and British rock critic Fred Deller wrote in Mojo Magazine that his work was "deserving of a far wider audience."

== Early years/influences ==
Carroll was born in Dublin, Ireland in 1972. Aged 15 he moved to London. He played in several punk bands during this time.

A 7" single was recorded in 1989 at a studio in Islington, London. 250 copies were pressed of this record but most were subsequently destroyed. A test pressing of the record is the only known copy to exist. In an interview with Uncut magazine he said "The Sex Pistols and Buddy Holly were the two things that changed my life." Carroll has cited Bob Dylan and Brian Wilson among his inspirations. In an article for the US magazine, American Songwriter in 2013, Carroll spoke about the diversity of his influences, "All through my life I have been drawn to melodies and so often these melodies were delivering urgent, savvy messages and stories. Frequently these tales and stories came from so-called outsiders. The voices that sang these songs were distinct and unique. They filled your heart and refreshed your soul. From Chuck Berry to Chuck D. Anything was possible. From the Sex Pistols to Captain Beefheart. There are no rules. From Crass to Bob Dylan. There is no authority but yourself."

=== Rough Trade ===
Returning to Dublin in 1990, Carroll was a founding member and the sole songwriter of Dublin three-piece power/punk band, Puppy Love Bomb. The band recorded several radio sessions for the Dave Fanning show and were courted by record labels, notably Warner Brothers, before eventually signing with the UK independent label Rough Trade and releasing 3 singles. Two EPs were produced by Martin Carr of The Boo Radleys. The band toured across Europe with Bob Mould's post Hüsker Dü outfit, Sugar. Mould joined the band on the last night of the tour to play a version of The Beatles classic song, Ticket To Ride. No album ever materialised as the label fell into financial difficulties and the band split acrimoniously after a final show at the South by Southwest Festival in Austin, Texas. Carroll returned to London where Rough Trade took over his management. The group's official recorded output has been out of print since 1994. Although the band only released 10 songs commercially, outtakes, radio sessions, demos and unreleased material have surfaced on several bootleg CDs originating from Japan. The recorded output and copyright is now under the ownership of One Little Indian Records.

=== 1996–1999 ===
The Hormones were a rock band formed in London in 1996. Carroll was the sole songwriter for the group, whose sound was described as a mixture between Teenage Fanclub and Stiff Little Fingers. Carroll was a founder of the band, who released their debut single in 1996 as part of the Trade2/Island records singles club. The band members were Jez Housden on Bass and former Guns n' Wankers and Wildhearts drummer, Pat Walters. The group eventually signed to Richard Branson's V2 label and released 5 singles. The third single "Mr. Wilson" was Carroll's tribute to Brian Wilson of The Beach Boys, the lyrics almost entirely consisting of Beach Boys song titles. Brian Wilson heard the track and Carroll was invited to the legendary songwriter's birthday show at New York City's Beacon Theatre in 1999. An album, Where Old Ghosts Meet (a reference from On Raglan Road by Patrick Kavanagh), was released in 1998 but deleted the same week. It has been listed in a book 101 Irish Records You Need to Hear Before You Die.

The band featured in the wedding episode of US TV show Friends - a track written by Carroll and originally issued as a B-side, "Tired Old Souls", was featured. The band toured consistently throughout the UK and Europe. Carroll also performed with the Scottish Poet/Songwriter Eric Bogle at the Weavers Club in London in 1996 and the band opened for The Cranberries on a European tour in 1999. A 2-CD edition of the album was issued in Japan on the Excellent label in 2002 in a limited run of 1000 copies. The bonus disc featured B-sides and unreleased material. A second pressing of the vinyl edition was issued on the Velvet label in Japan in a pressing of 500 copies. The group split in 1999 after a show in Madrid, Spain and the recorded output remains out of print. A multi disc (6CD) bootleg set was released on the Last Waltz label in Japan in 2003; it included demos, outtakes, alternate mixes, radio sessions and unreleased material. The group released 5 singles from the Where Old Ghosts Meet album, with each single featuring 3 exclusive non-album B-sides, which added up to 15 extra songs that were not included on the original album.

=== Solo period (1999–present) ===
==== Universal Music/Evangeline Recorded Works/High Noon Recordings ====
Carroll signed to Universal Music in 1999 and recorded his first solo album, Ten of Swords later that year. 3 singles were released in Ireland only. Carroll played all of the instruments himself as well as taking on co-production duties with longtime recording partner, Adi Winman. Former Smiths Guitarist, Craig Gannon played on several tracks. Gannon also toured the album with Carroll across the UK and Japan in 2002. The album was hampered by further record company problems. The UK label refused to release the record. In an interview with The Irish Times in 2005 Carroll said, "Sometimes record companies will sign you up so no-one else can, and that happened to me. I was left dangling at Universal for two years of my life so I had no hesitation in saying goodbye." The Irish division of Universal pressed the album and sent it to media but it was withdrawn a week before its scheduled release date. Legendary UK A&R figure, Andrew Lauder eventually released the album on his Evangeline label in 2002 and the record was met with critical acclaim with UK music magazine Uncut awarding it a 4 star review and calling it "One of the finest debuts of recent times."

The album received mainly positive critical feedback. Mojo magazine's review of the album stated "A soul full of Simon & Garfunkel, The Byrds and The Buzzcocks...he could move to Nashville and become a millionaire." The Village Voice in New York said "He sounds like a jacked up Wilco." Ireland's Hot Press ran a poor review under the heading "Blunt Sword" and criticised Carroll's version of the traditional song "Row the Boat Ashore", noting that its inclusion was a "blunder of Spinal Tap proportions, it's not funny and it's not clever." The Independent wrote "His dealings with the record industry are fast becoming stuff of legend but he delivers a wide range of musical goods with palpable passion." The Irish Times in an interview with Carroll in 2005 wrote that "those who skipped over 'Row The Boat Ashore' on Ten of Swords and worried about the inclusion of 'On Raglan Road' on All Wrongs Reversed were missing the point and the music." The cover of the album is a homage to the infamous bootleg label, 'Trade Mark of Quality'. It was reissued again with different packaging by High Noon Recordings in 2006. In 2014 One Little Indian released a remastered and expanded edition of Ten of Swords as part of a comprehensive overhaul of Carroll's back catalogue.

Evangeline released All Wrongs Reversed, a compilation of B-sides and rarities in 2003. The original album contained 11 songs including a cover of Bob Dylan's "Gates of Eden". Later that year the song appeared as a download on the official Bob Dylan webpage. The album also included another Dylan song, "Senor, Tales of Yankee Power". Marc Carroll has also recorded Dylan's "The Times They Are a-Changin'" as a B-side on the UK single "Crashpad Number" and "Tombstone Blues" for Uncut Magazine's Highway 61 Revisited...Revisted tribute CD. Rock critic and author, Johnny Rogan reviewed the album for Mojo saying "A classy compendium of lost songs and rarities, as ever, his pop sensibility is positively tangible, permeating almost every track." The Album was reissued again in different packaging by High Noon in 2006. In 2014 One Little Indian released a remastered and completely revised edition of the album that duplicated only 5 songs from the original while adding 10 previously unreleased tracks, including "2541", "The Main" and "Now That You Know Me", all of which were written by former Husker Du drummer and songwriter, Grant Hart. Carroll's first show as a solo artist was with Hart in 1995. All Wrongs Reversed also featured a cover version of the Buffalo Springfield song, "For What It's Worth".

In 2005 Evangeline released the second album, World on a Wire. The sound of the album was vastly different with the bulk of the songs being written on the piano and with string arrangements. Uncut magazine awarded the album a 4 star review writing, "For the follow up to the mighty 'Ten of Swords' Carroll has dampened the psych pop fizz for a slower dazzle and it's the more layered arrangements that set these wonderful songs of personal faith aglow." Mojo magazine in their review wrote, "He draws out some fetching melodies, none better than No Time at All which encapsulates his striking ability to make coherent music about inner confusion." The Irish Times with another 4 star review said, "The truth is the guy is something of a genius; On World on a Wire he has opted for strings of a more mellow nature and created a record of warmth, truth, beauty and something approximating a career best. If Bob Dylan raised on an aural diet of Brian Wilson rather than Woody Guthrie appeals to you, then prepare to be blown away." Ireland's Hot Press magazine noted "fans of Cohen, Buckley, Cave and Cash should find plenty of resonance on this brave artistic statement." Maverick Magazine in their review picked up on Carroll's lyric writing, "There is a darkness and quite startling intensity to his lyrics that can make the listener feel decidedly uncomfortable." The change in musical direction wasn't without its critics. One review for Planet Sound said "It is the benchmark for disappointing albums in 2005." 3 singles were released from the album. The album was reissued again in different packaging and with a bonus DVD by High Noon in 2006. In 2014 One Little Indian released a remastered and expanded edition of World on a Wire as part of a comprehensive overhaul of Carroll's back catalogue. The album was listed in a book 101 Irish records You Need To Hear Before You Die. The same book also referenced the 1998 album, "Where Old Ghosts Meet."

In 2009 Carroll's 4th album Dust of Rumour was released by High Noon Recordings. The album was recorded with longtime engineer/producer, Adi Winman. Carroll played all the instruments on the recording. Uncut Magazine gave the album a 4 star review and Fred Dellar in a 4 star review for Mojo wrote "Marc Carroll is something special, a performer in for the long term and deserving of a far wider audience." Gavin Martin writing for the Daily Mirror, gave the album a 5 star review, "Blending reverberating songs of the soul, hard haunted Celtic odysseys and his raw intimate vocals, his third album shows the respect of legends is well deserved." The Times newspaper in the UK said "Goosebumps surge up your spine." The Irish Times awarded the album with a 4 star review and said, "It is a record of sweet liberty, beautiful melodies and superbly crafted songs that hint at emotional loss and glass-half- empty sentiments, but with a joyous mix of lilting airs and guitar jingle-jangle that tumble from each song. Another great record from a guy who remains one of Ireland's virtually lost yet truly great songwriters." Q Magazine reviewed the album with "A gifted songwriter and a throwback to the golden age of West Coast rock, his third solo album is steeped in late-'60s Americana." Ireland's Hot Press magazine were not so positive in their critique and labelled the album as "well crafted but dull." 3 singles were released from the album. In 2014 One Little Indian released a remastered and expanded edition of Dust of Rumour as part of a comprehensive overhaul of Carroll's back catalogue.

==== One Little Indian records ====
Carroll signed to the UK Independent record label One Little Indian in 2011. The label released a 12 track retrospective collection, In Silence in the same year. Released as a Limited Edition 200gram Heavyweight Vinyl and CD. Most of the vinyl was destroyed in a warehouse fire at the PIAS headquarters during the London riots of 2011. The album received a 4 star review in Uncut magazine as well as the 'Must have reissue' in the British Sunday Times. The album also garnered 4 star reviews from Americana, Sunday Express and other publications. Record Collector Magazine wrote, "Having been making music just under the radar for well over a decade now, it's only fair that Carroll gets his turn in the spotlight. While his albums should receive more attention than this compilation, In Silence certainly serves as a good introduction to his multifarious talents."

The album Stone Beads And Silver was released on One Little Indian in January 2013. The record was recorded in Silver Lake, Los Angeles and Burbank. Parts of the record were also recorded at Levon Helm's studio in Woodstock, New York. Carroll also brought in other musicians to play on the album that included former Bob Dylan guitarist and multi-instrumentalist, Larry Campbell, members of Midlake, The Levon Helm Band, My Morning Jacket, Courtney Marie Andrews and the Brian Wilson Band. The album was one of his most critically acclaimed records. Uncut Magazine gave the album a 7/10 review saying, "Carroll's incisive writing brings striking twists to trad archetypes and Dylan regular Larry Campbell is among those ensuring that songs fly." Mojo Magazine in their review said, "It's certainly relaxed his shoulders a little, bringing a touch of mini opera to the mid 70's Beach Boys sound." Ireland's Hot Press Review ran a 7/10 review with "A hugely pleasing odyssey into Americana." No Depression in the US in their review suggested "Every track is a treat, a series of unerring glimpses into the heart of an auteur who deserves to be elevated to the highest rungs of today's singer/songwriter elite. Simply put, Stone Beads and Silver ought to be considered essential listening for anyone." The 405 review said the album "exudes a melodical liberation, a feeling of incomprehensible vastness, a kind of emotion so indefinable, leeaving you in a dazed meditation." LS Magazine wrote "Carroll's unique concoction of folk, blues, punk and country has shamefully hidden beneath the public eye..he really is Ireland's hidden treasure."

=== Live performance ===
Live performances have been sporadic in recent years and Carroll has not toured consistently since 2005. Some one-off performances have taken place in Los Angeles over the past decade including shows with Brent Rademaker from Beechwood Sparks and the LA based Belle Gardens. Carroll has not played in Ireland since 2006. Reviewing the Guilfest Festival on 4 July 2003, Uncut Magazine wrote "Saying nothing at first, instead letting his songs picture storm lashed apocalypse and drug drained romance, the Irishman's attacking presence ignores the crowd's somewhat somnolence, burning through it.".

==== Remasters 2014 ====
In January 2014 One Little Indian released remastered, reissued and expanded editions of the first 4 Marc Carroll albums. Ten of Swords, All Wrongs Reversed, World on a Wire and Dust of Rumour each included extra tracks of B-sides, rarities, live and previously unreleased material. Americana UK wrote a comprehensive review of the reissues and said, "Marc Carroll isn't an easy man to pin down; it is hard enough during the course of one album, let alone across these four..an impassioned performer, every word, every chord is important, there is no scope for coasting or compromise, the energy pours out." On 7 March 2014 The Irish Daily Star gave 4 star reviews to World on a Wire and All Wrongs Reversed saying "These two capture him as a poet and expert handler of other peoples songs."

==== 2015 ====
A new album, 'Love Is All Or Love Is Not At All', was released by One Little Indian Records on 6 November 2015. The album features a collaboration on the title track with the author, poet, philosopher and musician, Penny Rimbaud, co-founder of the seminal and highly influential band and collective, Crass, as well as contributions from Jody Stephens of Big Star and Pete Thomas of The Attractions. Gee Vaucher, the artist responsible for the iconic Crass record sleeves designed the artwork for the album. It earned 4 star reviews from Mojo, Uncut, Record Collector and the Irish Times and enthusiastic reviews across Europe and has been one of Carroll's most critically acclaimed albums to date. Record Collector magazine in a 4 star review said it 'was a record for our times' The Irish Times in a 4 star review said 'These are Carroll's most empathetic songs to date'

"Against All Odds", A Multi disc deluxe box set documenting the 'Love Is All Or Love Is not At All' album sessions was released in March 2026. The box includes 5LP's, 3CD's, Cassette, a 7" Single, Signed card, Print, Stencil, Poster, Card mounted badge set and 12 page booklet.

=== Studio albums ===
- Where Old Ghosts Meet (LP, CD, V2 1998, UK)
- Where Old Ghosts Meet (LP - 500 copies re-issues, Velvet Records, Japan, 1999)
- Where Old Ghosts Meet (CD, Malaysia, 1998)
- Where Old Ghosts Meet (Cassette, Malaysia, 1998)
- Where Old Ghosts Meet (Cassette, Indonesia, 1998)
- Where Old Ghosts Meet (Limited Edition 2CD - Excellent records, Japan 2002. Includes bonus disc of 13 extra tracks)
- Ten Of Swords (Withdrawn CD - Universal Music, 2000, Alternate slipcase sleeve)
- Ten Of Swords (CD - Evangeline Records, 2002, Blue sleeve)
- Ten Of Swords (Japan CD - Excellent Records, 2002, Red sleeve)
- Ten Of Swords (LP, CD - High Noon Recordings 2006, Alternate sleeve for LP, Slipcase CD),
- Ten of Swords Remastered and Expanded Edition (CD, One Little Indian, 2014)
- All Wrongs Reversed (CD - Evangeline Records, 2003)
- All Wrongs Reversed (CD - High Noon Recordings, 2005)
- All Wrongs Reversed Remastered and Expanded Edition (CD - One Little Indian, 2014)
- World On A Wire (CD - Evangeline Recordings, 2005)
- World On A Wire (LP, CD, DVD - High Noon Recordings 2006. Slipcase CD)
- World on a Wire Remastered and Expanded Edition (CD - One Little Indian, 2014)
- World on a Wire The Original Mix (LP, CD - Rattlesnake, Japan 2026)
- Dust Of Rumour (LP, CD, High Noon Recordings, 2009)
- Dust of Rumour Remastered And Expanded Edition (CD - One Little Indian, 2014)
- In Silence (LP, CD - One Little Indian, 2014)
- Stone Beads And Silver (LP, CD - One Little Indian, 2014)
- Love Is All Or Love Is Not At All (2LP, CD - One Little Indian, 2015)
- Live/Radio (LP, Rattlesnake, Japan 2026)
- The Singles (LP, Rattlesnake, Japan 2026)
- B-Sides (LP, Rattlesnake, Japan 2006)
- B-Sides Volume Two (LP, Rattlesnake, Japan 2006)
- Against All Odds (Limited Deluxe Box Set, 5LP, 3CD, 7", Cassette, Stencil, Poster, Postcards, Signed card, Print and 12 page booklet. HNBX1948, January 2026.)

=== Singles and EPs ===
- White Label 7" Vinyl (1989)
- "Too Busy Thinking/Liar" 7" Single (Rough Trade, 1993)
- Not Listening EP 7"/12"/CD (Rough Trade, 1994
- Not Listening EP CD (Festival Records, Australia, 1994)
- Bobby Milk EP Double 7" Poster Pack/CD (Rough Trade, 1994)
- Are You With Us 7" Vinyl/CD (Trade 2/Island Records, 1996)
- Are You With Us 7" Vinyl (Japan, 500 copies)
- This Is The Sound 7" Green Vinyl/CD (V2, 1997)
- Stay Ahead 7" Vinyl/CD (V2, 1997)
- Don't Let Them Get You Down 7" Vinyl/CD (V2, 1998)
- Mr. Wilson 7" Vinyl/CD (V2, 1998)
- Idiot World CD (Universal Music, Irish Only. 2001)
- Crashpad Number CD (Universal Music, Irish Only. 2001)
- You Saved My Life Again Last Night CD (Universal Music, Irish Only. 2001)
- Crashpad Number CD EP (Evangeline Recorded Works, UK 2002)
- Mrs. Lullaby CD EP (Evangeline Recorded Works, UK 2002)
- Dear World CD EP (Excellent Records, Japan 2002)
- Crashpad Number CD Digipak (Evangeline Recorded Works, UK 2003)
- Swansong CD Digipak (Evangeline Recorded Works, UK 2003)
- Talk Again CD Digipak (Evangeline Recorded Works, 2005)
- Talk Again 7" Orange Vinyl (High Noon, 2005)
- A Way Back Out of Here CD Digipak (Evangeline Recorded Works, 2005)
- "Always" (High Noon, 2009)
- What's Left of My Heart (High Noon, 2009)
- Now Or Never (High Noon, 2009)
- Matty Groves 7" Red Vinyl (High Noon, 2010. Numbered 250 copies)
- "(It Was) Lust Not Love" (One Little Indian, 2013)
- The Fool Disguised in Beggars Clothes (One Little Indian, 2013)
- Ball and Chain (One Little Indian, 2015)
- Out On The Streets US 7" Black Vinyl 650 copies (Puke 'n Vomit, 2020)
- Out On The Streets US 7" Orange Vinyl 100 copies (Puke 'n Vomit, 2020)

== Film, television and compilation appearances ==
=== Television ===
- Friends – Tired Old Souls
- Sky Sports – Be What You Are
- BBC Match of the Day – Idiot World
- CH4, Hollyoaks – No Time at All

=== Compilations ===
- The Tip Sheet CD (UK 1994, 'Not Listening')
- The Tip Sheet CD (UK 1994, 'Blind')
- Rough Trade Singles Club Vol.4 CD (JAPAN 1994, 'Too Busy Thinking/Liar')
- Pinaccle independent CD (UK 1994 'Not Listening')
- In The City '96 CD (UK 1996 'Feel Alright' (Demo)
- Firkin Greats CD (UK 1997 V2 'This Is The Sound' (Single Version)
- V2 Compilation CD (UK 1997 'Stay Ahead')
- V2 Compilation CD (UK 1997 'Mr Wilson' (Demo)
- Bewildered CD (UK 1997 'This Is The Sound')
- The Knowledge CD (UK 1998 'Stay Ahead')
- Melody Maker In Car Stereo CD (UK 1998 'Stay Ahead')
- The Speed of Sound CD (Ireland 1998 'This Is The Sound')
- Hot Shots CD (Ireland 1998 S 'A House by the Hill')
- Mojo Machine 4 (UK 1998 'Dig Like Merry Hell')
- Q The Music 7 CD (UK 1998 'Don't Let them Get You Down')
- Club Hits 98/99 CD (UK 1998 'Be What You Are')
- A Bucketfull of Possibilities CD (UK 2004 'You Saved My Life Again Last Night' (Acoustic Version)
- IPO Vol.6 CD (US 2003 'Crashpad Number')
- Pop Renaissance CD (Japan 2004, 'Be What You Are' (Alternate Mix)
- Playlist CD (Ireland 2005 'Love Over Gold')
- Radio Cookie Scene CD (Japan 2002 'Crashpad Number')
- NME Rock 'N Roll Riot CD (UK 2003 'Idiot World')
- Uncut, Eight Miles High CD (UK 2003 'Crashpad Number')
- Uncut, White Riot Vol.1 CD (UK 2003 'London Calling')
- Uncut, Tracks Inspired By Bob Dylan (UK 2004, 'Gates of Eden')
- Uncut, Across The Great Divide CD (UK 2005 'No Time at All')
- Uncut, Highway 61 Revisited...Revisited CD (UK 2005 'Tombstone Blues')
- Five Way Street, A Tribute To Buffalo Springfield CD (US 2006, 'For What It's Worth')
- Hearts on Fire, Sweet Relief 2 CD (US 2010, 'Love Will Rule Our Hearts')
- The Word, Now Hear This CD (UK 2011, 'Love Over Gold')
- 20 years of Overthrow (Unofficial 3CD, 2023. "Crashpad Number")
