= Misspent Youth (band) =

English glam punk band

Background information
- Origin: Birmingham, England
- Genres: punk rock, glam rock
- Years active: 1975–1980

Misspent Youth were a glam punk band from Birmingham, England. Formed in 1975, they were heavily influenced by the rock bands, New York Dolls and The Stooges. They released the single "Betcha Wont Dance" backed with their anthem "Birmingham Boys" on ex-Black Sabbath manager Jim Simpson's record label Big Bear Records in 1979 and could "boast quite a following" in Birmingham.

== Career ==
The band's initial line-up consisted of Jon Buxton (guitar, vocals) Iain Hewitt (bass guitar) and Terry Boazman (drums). They made their debut early in 1976 at The Golden Eagle, Birmingham supporting Supanova (whose guitarist Keith Rimell would later join The Killjoys). They later added Dave Banks (vocals); Tony McIlwain replaced Boazman on drums. The band recorded their first demos "School Report," "Suzie’s Shinin'" and "Misspent Youth" at Nest Studios in Birmingham. Soon after Dave Banks left and subsequently Iain Hewitt left and was replaced on bass guitar by Stevie Cull. The new line-up again went into the studios, this time Outlaw Studios, Birmingham to record "Nightclub," "Its a Raid" and "Birmingham Boys," which were featured on local radio station BRMB.

After recording their most commercial song at Horizon 16 track Studios, home of Two Tone records, the band approached local entrepreneur Simpson about releasing it through his Big Bear label; called "Betcha Wont Dance" b/w "Birmingham Boys," it was given the catalogue number of BB20. Due to constant delays on the release date, the band lost patience and went to the plant where the record was pressed (in Dagenham) and removed 950 copies. Most were put into the local dump.

After bass player Stevie Cull left to be replaced by Peter Chapman, a 1000-strong petition from fans was gathered and sent to the BBC, which resulted in the appearance of Misspent Youth on "Look Hear" which took place in Dec 1979 at Pebble Mill Studios, Birmingham. Introduced by Toyah Willcox, they supported the ska band The Specials. The band went their separate ways in 1980. They were considered by some "to be Birmingham's finest live band of the era" and "one of the more popular under achieving punk bands of the era." In November 2002 Garden Records released a CD compilation of their work titled The Punk Years 1976-1980 "that goes some way to capturing the bands appeal".
