= Soho Roses =

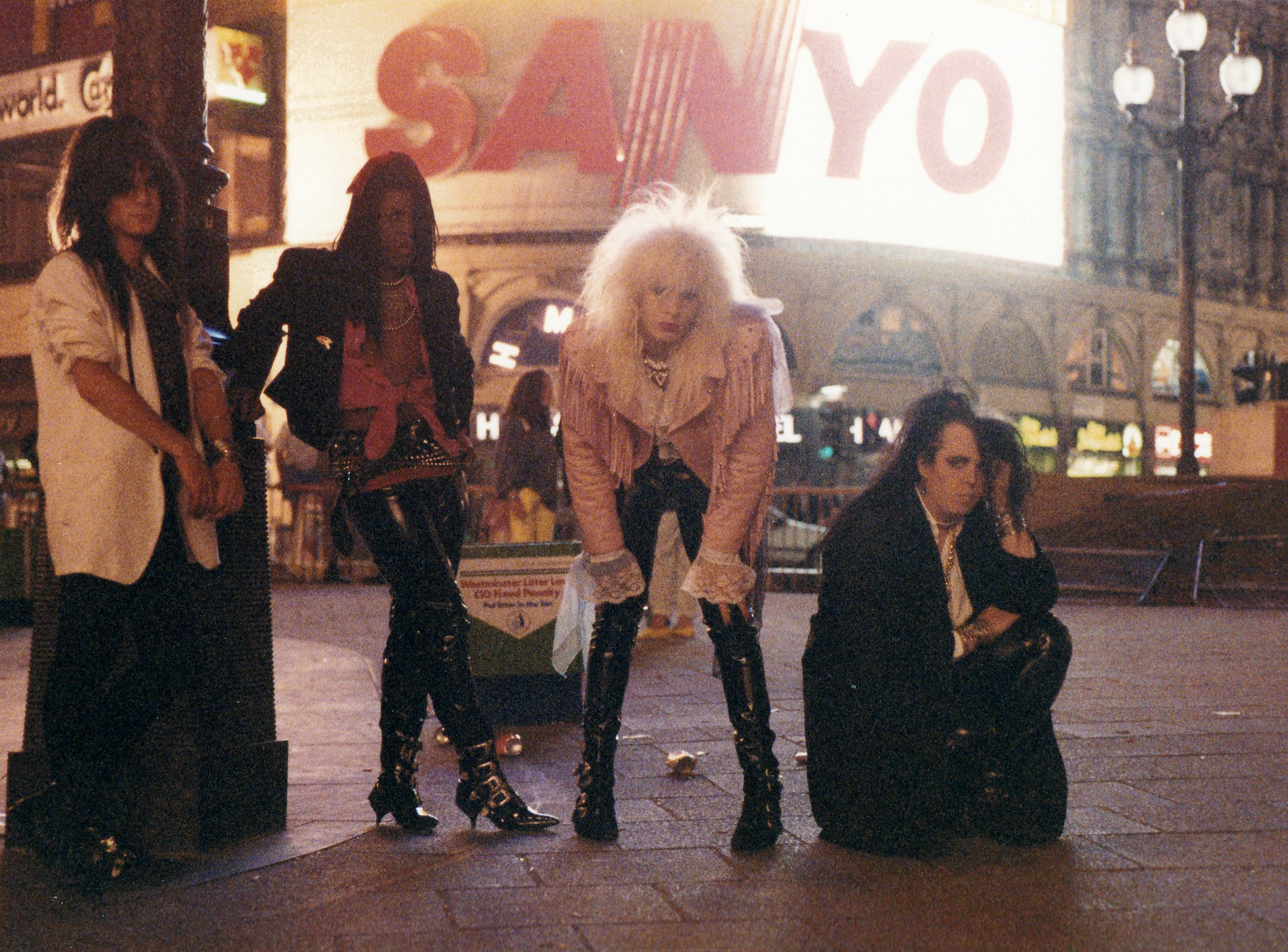
- Soho Roses in Piccadilly Circus, London, 1989, (L–R) Julien 'Dean' Parkin, Pat 'Panache' Walters, Paul 'Blittz' Toombs, Andy J 'DeGray' Davies

Background information
- Origin: London, United Kingdom
- Genres: Glam punk
- Years active: 1987–1989
- Labels: Trash Can of London, Full Breach Kicks

Soho Roses were a glam punk band from London. They emerged from the British glam scene along with Hanoi Rocks, the Dogs D'Amour, the Babysitters and the Quireboys; gaining popularity during the late 1980s with a series of singles and an album before splitting in 1989.

== Formation ==
Soho Roses evolved from Post-punk Glam band The V2s, formed in 1986 by Andy ‘The Riff’ Socratous, guitarist of punk band The Dark.

This formation rehearsed until they parted company with Mark ‘Boots’ Thomas and recruited Paul ‘Blittz’ Toombs. Andy ‘The Riff’ left after recording a demo. With the departure of Andy Riff, the band was re-named Soho Roses. The sound developed with Andy J. Davies’ trashy, punky, Rock n roll guitar taking centre stage, underpinned with Joolz's melodic bass playing.

== Whatever Happened To EP ==
After shows on the London circuit, Soho Roses formed a self-financed record company (Trash Can Records of London) and released their debut 12" 4-track EP titled Whatever happened To. The EP was recorded and mixed in two days with engineer and producer Colin Leggett at Carlton Studios, Bedford, UK in June 1987. Soho Roses' attitude at the time was summed up when budget constraints forced the decision to either remix the EP or release it on pink vinyl. The band chose a shocking pink vinyl release (and later blue vinyl). The record marked their commitment to the sprit of 'Trashy, Glam' with D.I.Y, punk ethics.

The EP bucked the trend for a 'Heavy Rock/ Metal Glam' sound, which was current at time, for a more sleazy rock 'n' roll vibe with an emphasis on catchy tunes. This split the British rock fraternity and brought the Soho Roses both praise and derision. Both of which the band revelled in. Although they were given enthusiastic reviews, journalists struggled to categorise them. In an interview with Chris Welch in Kerrang! magazine January 1988 they explain how they did not mind being called 'Glam' but because they did not lean too heavily on ballads they preferred to be called 'Trash'.

Whatever Happened To sold out of its initial pressing and was championed by influential British rock magazines Kerrang! and Metal Hammer; receiving critical acclaim from highly regarded rock journalist Chris Welch. Kim Fowley, manager of The Runaways, expressed an interest in the band. With U.K. live performances, interviews and reviews with Sounds (Mary Anne Hobbs), Metal Hammer, Kerrang (Ray Zell), the band's popularity increased significantly in the UK Glam Rock scene.

The band did several shows at the Marquee Club. On the strength of the buzz created, a follow up single "So Alone" was recorded in the spring of 1988 at Oasis Studios and Unit 3 studios in Camden and was released late summer that year.

== So Alone EP ==
The success of Whatever happened To EP and subsequent live shows led to further coverage in the form of interviews and reviews in the UK music press. Following a gig supporting Teenage Idols at the Marquee Club in 1988 Steevi Jaimz of Tigertailz allegedly punched a member of Soho Roses' entourage, triggering a notorious fight that resulted in Jaimz being ejected from the club. The press recognised a rebelliously comical undertone to this story. The band played at the 1998 Metal Hammer Xmas party at the London Astoria where Paul appeared on MTV.

So Alone was recorded in spring of 1988 at Oasis Studios and Unit 3 studios in Camden, London and released on their label Trash Can Records of London in August 1988, again with engineer and producer Colin Leggett, presented a more'polished, tighter sound, demonstrating how the band was evolving without compromising their trashy aesthetic.

"So Alone" received the accolade of 'single the century' from Metal Hammer's Mark Day. Strangely, it received two reviews in this magazine. Fan loyalty meant it appeared in the 'Reader's Chart' of that magazine in August, September and October 1988.

== The Third and Final Insult ==
Due to the rise of the American glam scene (Guns N' Roses etc) and differences in opinion regarding direction, in early 1989 Joolz announced that he wanted to leave the band triggering the mutual decision to split. In June 1989, days after a chaotic, swan song, sell-out gig at the Marquee Club, London, the band recorded The Third and Final Insult album.

This album was recorded by Andy Le Vien at RMS studios South Norwood London in 23.5 hrs from walking into the studio to walking out with the finished product.

It was released in the UK late Autumn 1989 and was later re-released in 2007 in an American retrospective package called Whatever Happened to... The Complete Works of Soho Roses. This was a special package release by American label Full Breach Kicks and included the total Soho Roses back catalogue including remixes of the So Alone EP from the original multi track recordings by guitarist Andy J. Davies who has become a respected figure in the underground punk world.

As fashionable LA bands such as Guns N' Roses and Poison increased in popularity in the UK, Soho Roses remained committed to their classic Glam Metal Punk influences like New York Dolls, Buzzcocks, and Sex Pistols. As the 1980s came to a close their distinctive punk sound was falling out of fashion, which increased their authenticity.

Soho Roses were a UK underground rock band noted for their DIY approach and musical independence. The band split prior to the wider Glam backlash of the period.

== Post Break Up ==
This attitude continued with each member's post Soho Roses career. Joolz joined The Wildhearts from August 1989 to mid 1991. Pat also spent time in The Wildhearts from early 1990 to October 1991. Later on both Joolz and Pat played in Guns n' Wankers, who released the album For Dancing and Listening on Fat Wreck Chords in 1994. The band's name was intended as a reference to their no nonsense role in the glam rock scene while other bands became increasingly corporate and insincere. Paul joined a band called Scarlet Tears. Andy went on to produce and play in various bands and work as a producer.

== Discography ==
=== Studio albums ===
Year	Title	Production
1989	The Third And Final Insult	Davies, Walters, Parkin, Toombs and Le Vien at RMS Studios, London, UK

=== Compilation albums ===
Year	Title	Production
1989	Metal Hammer’s The Best Of British Steel” (Featuring ‘So Alone’)	Davies, Walters, Parkin, Toombs and Leggett at Oasis Studios and Unit 3 Studios, London UK
2007	Whatever Happened To… The Complete Works Of Soho Roses	Davies, Walters, Parkin, Toombs, Leggett and Le Vein, at Oasis Studios, Unit 3 Studios and RMS Studios, London UK. Additional work at Carlton Studios, Bedford UK and Damage Recordings, Hitchin, UK

=== EPs ===
Year	Title	Production
1987	Whatever Happened To	Davies, Walters, Parkin and Toombs at Carlton Studios, Bedford UK
1988	So Alone	Davies, Walters, Parkin, Toombs and Leggett at Oasis Studios and Unit 3 studios, Camden UK

== Band members ==
=== As The V2s ===
- Andy ‘The Riff’ Socratous – guitar (1986–1987)
- Mark ‘Boots’ Thomas – lead vocals (1986-1987)
- Pat ‘Panache’ Walters – drums (1986-1987)
- Julien ‘Dean’ Parkin – bass guitar (1986-1987)
- Andy J. "DeGray’ Davies – guitar (1987)
- Paul ‘Blittz’ Toombs – vocals (1987)

=== As Soho Roses ===
- Pat ‘Panache’ Walters – drums (1987-1989)
- Julien ‘Dean’ Parkin – bass guitar (1987-1989)
- Andy J. ‘DeGray’ Davies - guitar (1987-1989)
- Paul ‘Blittz’ Toombs – vocals (1987-1989)

== See also ==
- List of glam punk artists
