= Leaving Home (Nicke Borg song) =

Single by Nicke Borg
- Released: 2011
- Genre: heavy metal
- Songwriters: Nicke Borg, Jojo Borg Larsson, Fredrik Thomander, Anders Wikström

"Leaving Home" is a song with lyrics written by Jojo Borg Larsson and music by Nicke Borg, Fredrik Thomander and Anders Wikström. It was performed by Nicke Borg at Melodifestivalen 2011, participating in the fourth semifinal in Malmö on 26 February 2011, from where it made it directly as the second song to the finals inside the Stockholm Globe Arena on 12 March the same year.

At the finals, the song was the 6th performance of the evening, getting 57th points reaching an eight positions.

The song entered Svensktoppen for one week, on 23 April 2011, reaching a 9th position before leaving chart.

== Charts ==
Chart (2011)	Peak position
Sweden (Sverigetopplistan)	9
