= Corpsing (band) =

English extreme metal band

- Origin: London, England
- Genres: Death metal Thrash metal Doom metal
- Years active: 2000 – present
- Labels: Goat of Mendes / Grindethic Records
- Members: Giuseppe Cutispoto; Mick Cutispoto; Baron; Wizzard Baboon
- Website: Official Band Website

Corpsing are an English extreme metal band. They have previously been signed to Jason Mendoca's (Akercocke) Goat of Mendes Records label and are due to release their next album through Grindethic Records.

== Background ==
Following his departure from his previous band Infestation in the year 2000, guitarist Giuseppe Cutispoto decided to form another metal band. He soon hooked up with his brother Mick (Lead Guitar) and started writing some material. Their initial intentions were to mix various metal elements such as Death, Black, Thrash and Doom with other, non metal influences. While writing the material they started looking for other band members to complete the line-up, and in 2002 Corpsing had a line-up and started rehearsing the material. After many months of rehearsals Corpsing were ready to record their debut album Watching the Thinker and in 2003 they signed to Goat of Mendes Records with whom later that year they would record their album. Watching the Thinker was subsequently released in October 2005.

Since the release of their debut album the line-up changed, Giuseppe and Mick were joined by The Wizard (Vocals/Bass) and Nick "The Baron" Plews (drums). In 2006 Corpsing started rehearsing and gigging with the new line-up and in June started recording their second album with producer Andy Davies. During this time Corpsing were joined by David Adambery (Synth Lord/soundscapes) which added another previously unheard dimension to the sound.

== Current line-up ==
- Giuseppe Cutispoto – Guitar
- Mick Cutispoto – Guitar
- Kyle Austin – Vocals
- James Cormack – Bass guitar
- Nicholas Plews – Drums

== Discography ==
- Watching the Thinker (Goat of Mendes Records, 2005)
- The Stench of Humanity (Grindethic Records, 2007)
- Regnum (2017)
- Civilization Under Nefarious Tyrants (2020)
