= Backyard Babies =

Swedish rock band

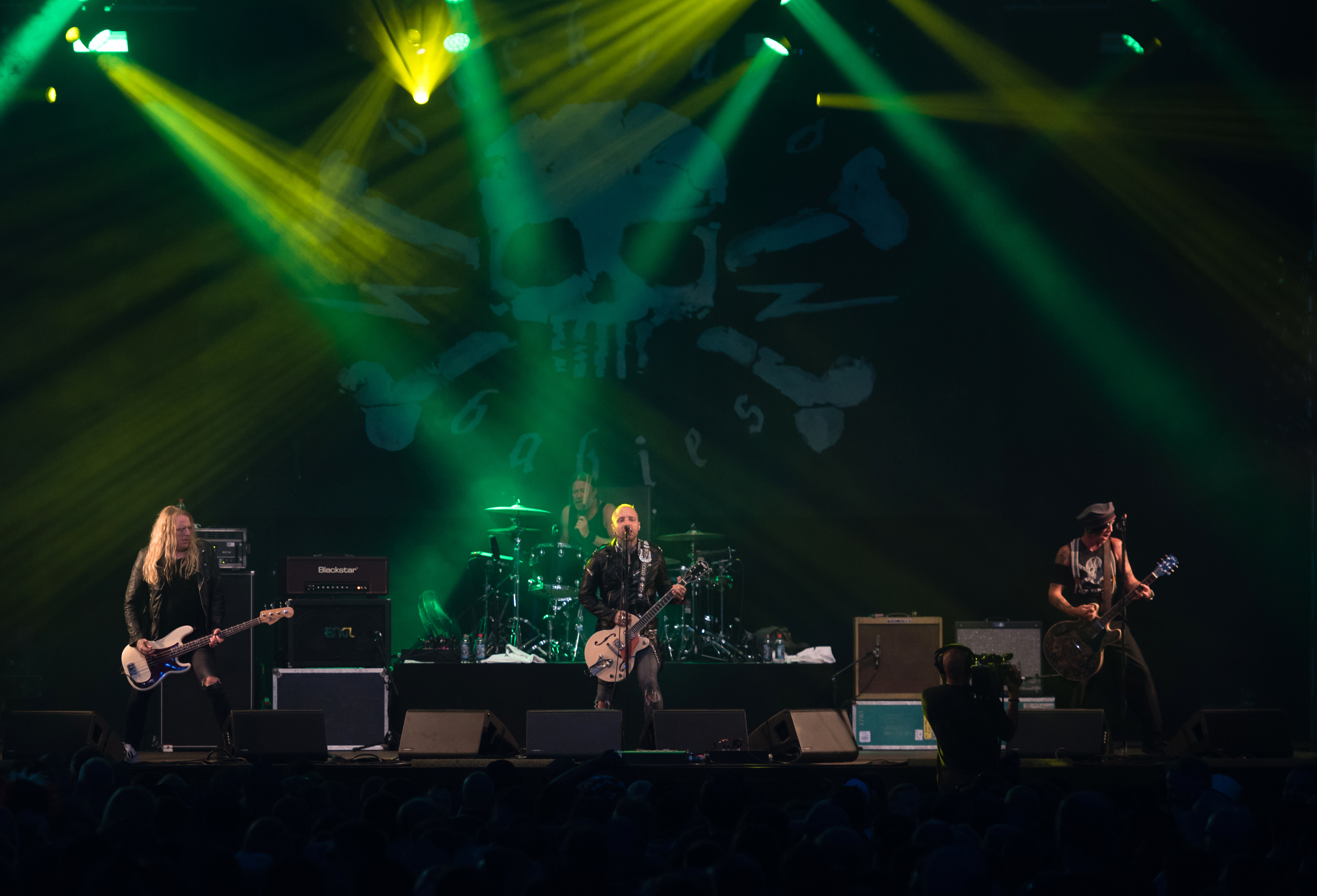
- Backyard Babies in 2018

Background information
- Origin: Nässjö, Sweden
- Genres: Hard rock, punk rock, glam punk
- Years active: 1987–1989 (as Tyrant); 1989–present (as Backyard Babies)
- Labels: Billion Dollar Babies/Versity Rights, BMG, Liquor & Poker, MVG, RCA, Smooch Pooch
- Members: Nicke Borg; Dregen; Johan Blomqvist; Peder Carlsson
- Past members: Tobias Fischer
- Website: backyardbabies.com

Backyard Babies is a Swedish rock band originally from Nässjö and currently based in Stockholm. The band was formed in 1987 and have released eight studio albums, in addition to winning two Swedish Grammy Awards.

They are largely attributed with popularizing sleaze rock in Scandinavia and Sweden. Their single "Minus Celsius" appears as a playable bonus track in Guitar Hero III: Legends of Rock and "Degenerated" is available as a downloadable song for Guitar Hero World Tour.

== History ==
Formed in 1987, Backyard Babies originally consisted of singer/bassist Tobbe (Tobias Fischer), guitarist Dregen, guitarist Johan Blomqvist, and drummer Peder Carlsson. They were then called Tyrant and played several live shows in their local area and recorded a rough demo. Tobbe was soon replaced by frontman Nicke Borg on vocals and guitar, and Blomqvist switched to bass. Fischer went on to be a professional photographer and web designer in Stockholm, continuing to work occasionally with his old bandmates.

In 1989, the band changed their name to Backyard Babies and recorded two more demos and did a national tour of Sweden. In 1991, the band self-released a debut EP titled Something to Swallow. This got them signed in 1993 by Swedish label Megarock Records.

Backyard Babies released their debut album Diesel & Power in 1994. The music on it took influences from rock, punk and blues. In addition to the album the band also released the single "Electric Suzy" with a cover of "Taxi Driver" by Hanoi Rocks as the B-side. After touring with former Hanoi Rocks members in Demolition 23 and doing a short headline tour in late 1995, premiering new songs that remain unreleased, the band was put on hiatus, as guitarist Dregen formed the garage rock band The Hellacopters. Dregen appeared on two albums with the Hellacopters" Supershitty to the Max! (1996) and Payin' the Dues (1997).

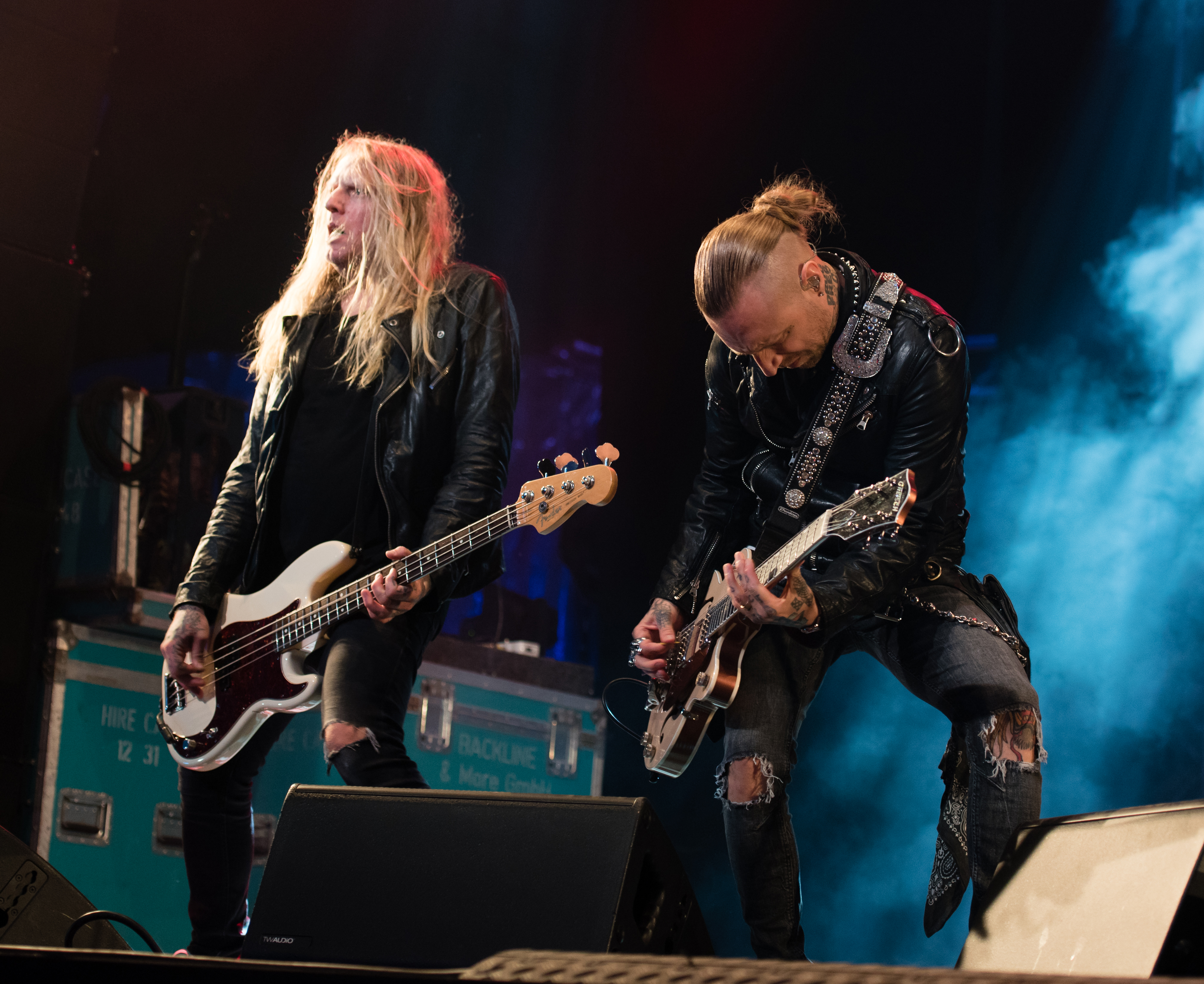
Bassist Johan Blomqvist and guitarist Nicke Borg performing in 2018

The Backyard Babies reunited in 1997, with a new record contract with MVG Records. They recorded their most-critically acclaimed album, Total 13. Critics compared the album favorably to the New York Dolls, Ramones and The Damned. They toured the United Kingdom with good response. A single was released from the album, "Bombed (Out of My Mind)", with the B-side "Rocker" featuring a duet with Hanoi Rocks frontman Michael Monroe. Their next single was the self-released "Is It Still Alright to Smile?". The B-side of the single was a cover of the Faster Pussycat track "Babylon" featuring guest appearances from Ginger of the Wildhearts and Nicke Andersson who had played with Dregen in the Hellacopters. In 1998 the band toured the United Kingdom once more, this time in support of Alice Cooper.

After the collaboration on the song "Babylon", Dregen, Ginger, and Nicke Andersson formed the side project Supershit 666, which released a six-track EP in 1999. Dregen returned to the Backyard Babies soon after as the band took off for another tour of the United Kingdom, this time in support of AC/DC.

The Babies recorded a follow-up to Total 13, titled Making Enemies is Good which has been described by some critics as a more "controlled chaos" approach than their previous effort. Two of the singles from it were hits "The Clash" and "Brand New Hate", the latter of which was co-written with Ginger. They toured in support of the album with Motörhead.

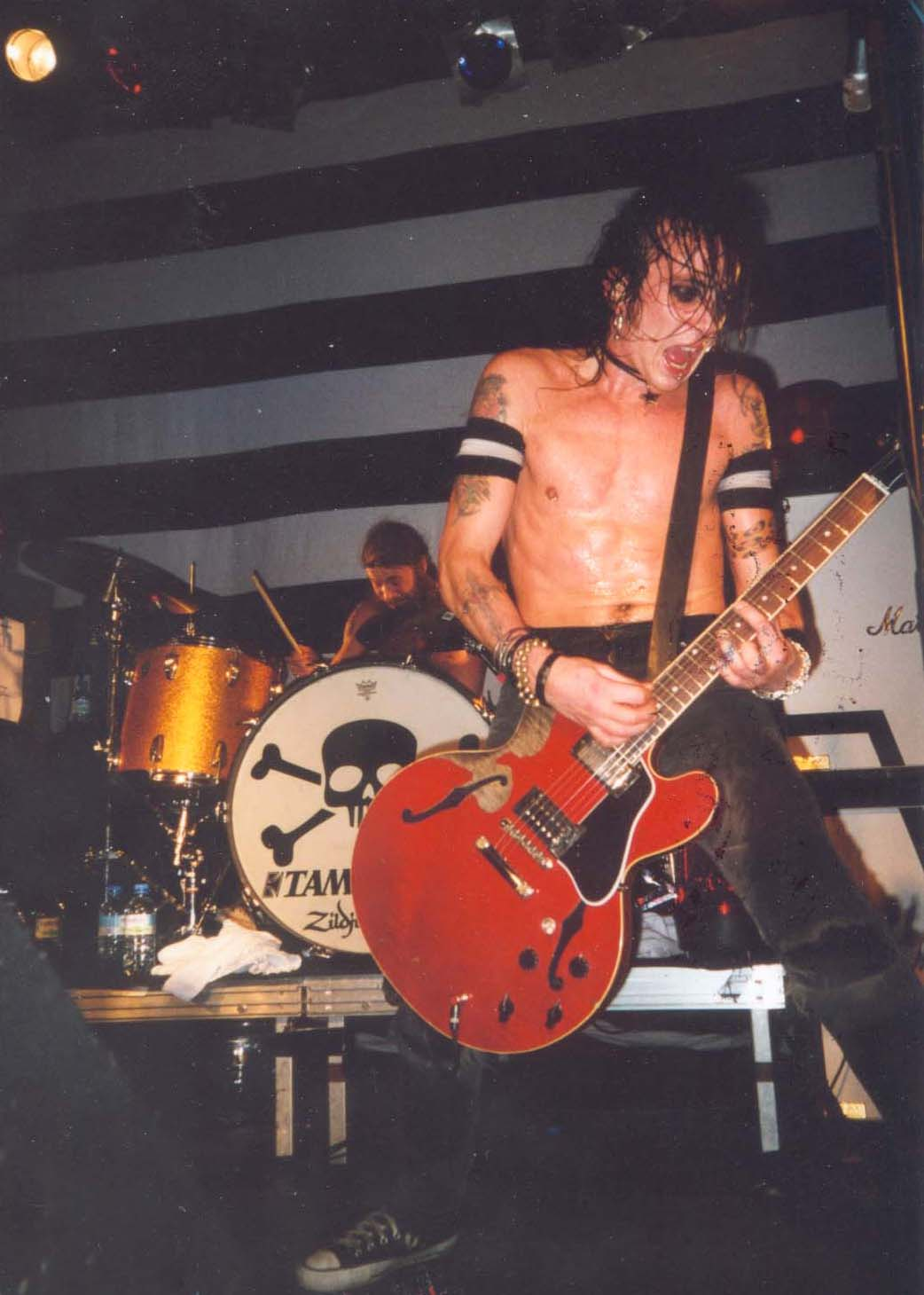
Drummer Peder Carlsson and guitarist Dregen performing in 2001

On 15 October 2002, Backyard Babies guitarist Dregen was on the front pages of Swedish national newspapers. After returning home from a club where he was DJing, he and his friend were assaulted, robbed, and knocked unconscious. Dregen suffered a broken jaw but the band continued recording their next album; Stockholm Syndrome. The album, released in 2003, was viewed by some fans as a return towards a more energetic and raw sound. The album won them a Swedish Grammy. The album spawned three singles, "Minus Celsius", "A Song for the Outcast" and "Friends".

During 2005, the band toured the United States (with openers The Chelsea Smiles & Crash Kelly) and Europe alongside Social Distortion. The album People Like People Like People Like Us, produced by Nicke Andersson of The Hellacopters, was released in 2006. It spawned two singles: "The Mess Age (How Could I Be So Wrong)" and "Dysfunctional Professional". A self-titled album was released in August 2008. The first single was "Fuck Off and Die". The second single "Degenerated" is supported by an animated video clip. Their self-titled 2008 album reached number 1 on the Swedish albums chart.

The compilation album Them XX was released in 2009 to honor the band's 20th anniversary. The accompanying tour was rumored to be their last. After a hiatus, the band reconvened with an announcement in May 2014. Their 2015 album Four by Four reached number 2 on the Swedish albums chart. In September 2018 they played at the Hard Rock Hell Sleaze festival in Sheffield, England.

The band released their eighth studio album,Sliver & Gold, in 2019.

During an interview with The Sound Lab in 2022, Dregen confirmed that Backyard Babies were on hiatus due to his commitments with The Hellacopters, but stated that were plans to create more music in the future.

== Members ==
Current

- Nicke Borg – lead vocals, rhythm guitar (1989–present)
- Dregen – lead guitar, backing vocals (1987–present)
- Johan Blomqvist – bass (1989–present), rhythm guitar (1987–1989)
- Peder Carlsson – drums, percussion (1987–present)

Past

- Tobias Fischer – lead vocals, bass (1987–1989)

== Discography ==
=== Albums ===
==== Studio albums ====
Year	Album	Peak positions		Certification
Year	Album	SWE	FIN	Certification
1994	Diesel and Power (Re-released 2006)	—	—	
1998	Total 13	12	—	
2001	Making Enemies Is Good	1	13	
2003	Stockholm Syndrome	2	—	
2006	People Like People Like People Like Us	3	22	
2008	Backyard Babies	1	31	
2015	Four by Four	2	17	
2019	Sliver & Gold	5	31	

==== Live albums ====
Year	Album	Peak positions
Year	Album	SWE
2005	Live Live in Paris	19

==== Compilation albums ====
Year	Album
2001	Independent Days
2002	From Demos to Demons: 1989–1992
2005	Tinnitus
2009	Them XX

=== Demos ===
Date	Demo album title	Notes
1989	Tyrant	–
1990	Backyard Babies	Not to be confused with similarly titled consequent 2008 album Backyard Babies
1991	Bite & Chew	–
1992	Diesel & Power	Not to be confused with similarly titled consequent 1994 album Diesel & Power

=== EPs ===
Year	Album	Peak positions
Year	Album	SWE
1991	Something to Swallow	—
1997	Knockouts EP	54
1998	Total 05	—
1998	Safety Pin & Leopard Skin	—

=== Singles ===
- "Electric Suzy" (1994)
- "Supershow" (split, 1996)
- "Look at You" (1997) (No. 88 United Kingdom)
- "Bombed (Out of My Mind)" (1997) (No. 95 United Kingdom)
- "Is It Still Alright to Smile?" (1998)
- "Highlights" (1998) (No. 79 United Kingdom)
- "Babylon" (1999)
- "Brand New Hate" (2001)
- "The Clash" (2001, BMG Sweden, b/w "Three Wise Monkeys", "Fashion (Changes with You)")
- "Minus Celsius" (22 October, 2003)
- "A Song for the Outcast" (2004)
- "Friends" (2004)
- "The Mess Age" (2006)
- "Dysfunctional Professional" (2006)
- "Fuck Off and Die" (2008)
- "Drool" (2008)
- "Th1rt3en or Nothing" (2015)

=== Videos ===
- "Electric Suzy" (1994)
- "Look at You" (1997)
- "Highlights" (1998)
- "Babylon" (live) (1999)
- "Brand New Hate" (2001)
- "The Clash" (2001)
- "Minus Celsius" (2003)
- "A Song for the Outcast" (2003)
- "Dysfunctional Professional" (2006)
- "Roads" (2006)
- "The Mess Age" (2006)
- "Fuck Off and Die" (2008)
- "Nomadic"
- "Abandon"
- "Gods Favourite"

=== Videography ===
- Live (from LiveZone) (2005)
- Jetlag: The Movie (2005)
