= Glam punk =

Fusion genre melding punk rock and glam rock

- Stylistic origins: Glam rock; proto-punk
- Cultural origins: Early 1970s, New York City
- Derivative forms: Punk rock; new wave; glam metal; post-punk revival

Other topics
- Androgyny

Glam punk is a subgenre of rock music that began in the early to mid-1970s and incorporates elements of proto-punk and glam rock. The genre was pioneered by the New York Dolls, who influenced the formation of other New York City groups the Stilettos, the Brats and Ruby and the Rednecks and bands in the United Kingdom including the Hollywood Brats and Jet. These bands largely began the early punk rock scene. The impact of Hanoi Rocks brought about a revived interest in the sound during the 1980s, seeing a revival with groups including the Dogs D'Amour and Soho Roses, and the pioneering of glam metal. Through the 1990s, some groups gained significant commercial success reviving the sound of glam punk, notably the Manic Street Preachers, Backyard Babies and Turbonegro.

== History ==
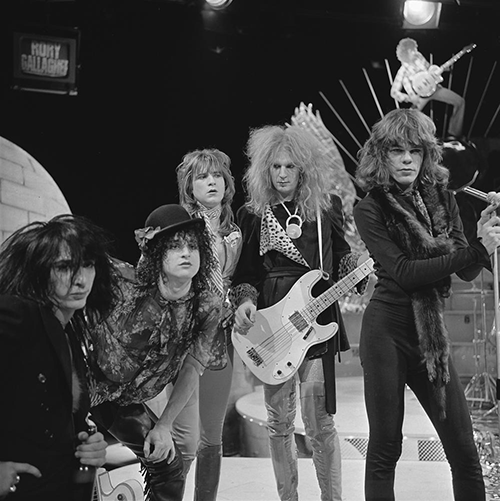
The New York Dolls, formed in 1971, were the first glam punk band

=== Origins ===
The first band to merge proto-punk music with a glam rock aesthetic was the New York Dolls, who formed in 1971. Glam punk has been seen as a backlash to the hippie folk music sensibilities of the 1960s. The band immediately influenced the formation of many bands in New York City's club scene of the time. Their style was adopted by a number of New York bands, including the Stilettos, the Brats and Ruby and the Rednecks, and subsequently was the catalyst for the city's early punk rock scene, which included Television, Talking Heads, Patti Smith, the Ramones, Blondie and Richard Hell and the Voidoids. The glam punk sound spread to other locations in the following years, where notable acts Hollywood Brats, Jet and Milk 'N' Cookies formed. Malcolm McLaren, who managed the New York Dolls in 1975, returned to England following the band's 1976 disbandment. There, he and his wife Vivienne Westwood used the New York Dolls, as well as other bands that they had seen while in New York, as inspiration for punk fashion and the creation of the Sex Pistols, who would largely popularise punk rock in the coming years.

=== Subsequent developments and influence ===
Finland's Hanoi Rocks led a revival of the glam punk sound in the 1980s, who Alternative Press writer Tim Stegall called "the revenge of the early '80s upon the world for the [New York] Dolls' mainstream commercial failure 10 years earlier". During their residency in London at the beginning of the decade influenced the formation of the Dogs D'Amour, Soho Roses, Kill City Dragons and the Babysitters. At the same time, Hanoi Rocks and the New York Dolls because the two most prominent influences on the emerging glam metal scene. From within the glam metal scene, the sleaze metal subgenre emerged in the late 1980s, which saw an even more prominent glam punk influence in artists including Faster Pussycat, Guns N' Roses, L.A. Guns and Shotgun Messiah.

Wales' Manic Street Preachers gained major commercial success in the United Kingdom in the early 1990s with the glam punk sound on their early albums Generation Terrorists (1991) and Gold Against the Soul (1993), however following the 1995 disappearance of their guitarist Richey Edwards, the band began pursuing a more pop-centric sound. With the release of their 1996 album Ass Cobra, Norwegian band Turbonegro adopted a glam punk sound, Alternative Press named the album as a "classic album [which] made 1996 a crucial year in punk history". In the following years, the band became what Kerrang! writer Jak Hutchcraft called "a cult phenomena in the rock world". Sweden's Backyard Babies' merger of glam and punk gained significant commercial success in the late 1990s and early 2000s, with their albums Total 13 (1998) and Making Enemies Is Good (2001) receiving the awards for Best Hard Rock/Metal Album at the Grammy Awards and spots in the Top 5 of Sweden's music charts.

In the early 2000s, the genre was a major influence on the post-punk revival that included D Generation, Toilet Böys and the Strokes.

== See also ==
- Glam metal
- Glam rock
- List of glam punk artists
