= Johan Blomqvist =

Swedish musician

Johan Blomqvist (born 6 March 1973 in Nässjö, Sweden) has been the bass guitarist for Swedish punk rock band Backyard Babies since 1987.

Johan Blomqvist also played as a guest bass guitarist when the Swedish rock-group Kent performed the white concert at Stockholms Stadion in 2003.
