= List of crust punk bands =

This is a list of crust punk bands. Crust punk is a genre that draws from both punk rock and extreme metal.

Band	Country	Formed	Notes
Agrimonia	Sweden	2005	
Amebix	UK	1978	
Anti Cimex	Sweden	1981	
Antischism	USA	1988	
Antisect	UK	1982	
Anti System	UK	1981	
Aus-Rotten	USA	1992	
Behind Enemy Lines	USA	2000	
Black Breath	USA	2006	
Broken Bones	UK	1983	
Concrete Sox	UK	1984	
Corrupt Leaders	Canada	2013	
Cult Leader	US	2013	
Darkthrone	Norway	1987	
Deviated Instinct	UK	1984	
Discharge	UK	1977	
Disfear	Sweden	1992	
Disrupt	USA	1987	
Doom	UK	1987	
Down Among the Dead Men	Scandinavia	2013	
Downfall of Gaia	Germany	2008	
Driller Killer	Sweden	1993	
Dystopia	USA	1991	
Early Graves	USA	2007	
Extreme Noise Terror	UK	1985	
Fall of Efrafa	UK	2005	
Filth	USA	1989	
Final Warning	USA	1982	
F-Minus	USA	1995	
From Ashes Rise	USA	1997	
Gallhammer	Japan	2003	
Gauze	Japan	1981	
Hellbastard	UK	1986	
His Hero Is Gone	USA	1995	
Iron Monkey	UK	1994	
Kaaos	Finland	1980	
Leftöver Crack	USA	1998	
Mob 47	Sweden	1982	
Nausea	USA	1985	
Neurosis	USA	1985	
Raw Radar War	USA	2002	
Sacrilege	UK	1984	
Septic Tank	UK	1994	
Skarp	USA	1999	
Skitsystem	Sweden	1994	
Sore Throat	UK	1987	
Svalbard	UK	2011	
Tau Cross	International	2013	
Totem Skin	Sweden	2012	
Toxic Narcotic	USA	1989	
Tragedy	USA	1995	
The Varukers	UK	1979	
Vorvaň	Russia	2009	
Wolfbrigade	Sweden	1995	
Young and in the Way	USA	2009	
