= Punk rock subgenres =

A number of overlapping punk rock subgenres have developed since the emergence of punk rock (often shortened to punk) in the mid-1970s. Even though punk genres at times are difficult to segregate, they usually show differing characteristics in overall structures, instrumental and vocal styles, and tempo. However, sometimes a particular trait is common in several genres, and thus punk genres are normally grouped by a combination of traits.

== Afro-punk ==
Afro-punk (sometimes spelled AfroPunk) refers to the participation of African Americans in the punk and alternative music cultures. Afro-punks represent a majority in the punk culture in predominantly black regions of the world that have burgeoning punk communities, such as in parts of Africa. There are many punk rock bands with black members, and several with lineups that are all black.

== Anarcho punk ==
Anarcho-punk is punk rock that promotes anarchism. The term anarcho-punk is sometimes applied exclusively to bands that were part of the 1970s/1980s anarcho-punk movement in the United Kingdom. Some, however, use the term to refer to any punk music with anarchist lyrical content.

== Art punk ==
Art punk or avant punk refers to punk rock and post-punk music of an experimental bent, or with connections to art school, the art world, or the avant-garde.

== Christian punk ==
Christian punk (or Christ punk, as it is called in reference to crust punk) is punk rock with some degree of Christian lyrical content. Given the edginess of punk and some of its subgenres, such as hardcore punk, many bands have been rejected by the Christian music industry. Due to the message and nature of Christian punk, many traditional punks ridicule it.

== Crust punk ==
Crust punk (also known as Crust or Stenchcore) is a subgenre which evolved in the early-1980s in England, and has songs with dark and pessimistic lyrics that linger on political and social ills. Crust is partly defined by its "bassy" and "dirty" sound. It is often played at a fast tempo with occasional slow sections. Vocals are usually guttural and may be grunted, growled or screamed. While the term was first associated with Hellbastard, Amebix have been described as the originators of the style, along with Discharge and Antisect.

== Deathrock ==
Deathrock is a subgenre of punk rock incorporating horror elements and spooky atmospherics, that emerged on the West Coast of the United States in the early 1980s. Deathrock songs use simple chords, echoing guitars and prominent bass. Drumming emphasizes repetitive, post-punk beats within a 4/4 time signature. To create atmosphere, scratchy guitars are sometimes used. Lyrics can vary, but are typically introspective and surreal, and deal with the dark themes of isolation, gloom, disillusionment, loss, life, death, etc.; as can the style, varying from harsh and dark to upbeat, melodic and tongue-in-cheek. Deathrock lyrics and other musical stylistic elements often incorporate the themes of campy horror and sci-fi films, which in turn leads some bands to adopt elements of rockabilly and surf rock.

== Egg punk ==
Egg punk is an Internet-based subgenre of punk rock that emerged during the 2010s referring to bands with a lo-fi recording style and satirical tone. The genre is influenced by new wave band Devo and historically referred to as Devo-core. The origins of egg punk are attributed both to a community of DIY midwestern American punk rock artists from the early 2010s and their subsequent characterization as "egg punk" by a series of internet memes circulated in the late 2010s.

== Garage punk ==
Garage punk is punk rock heavily influenced by garage rock. Other influences include soul music, beat music, surf rock, power pop and psychedelic rock. Often it uses lo-fi aesthetics over catchy melodies.

== Glam punk ==
Glam punk (also called glitter punk) fuses elements of punk rock and glam rock, commonly reflected in image.

== Hardcore punk ==
Hardcore punk (or hardcore) music is generally faster and more aggressive than earlier punk rock. Hardcore, which originated in the late 1970s, was heavily involved with the rise of the independent record labels in the 1980s, and with the DIY ethics in underground music scenes. It has influenced a number of music genres which have experienced mainstream success, such as alternative rock, grunge, alternative metal, metalcore, thrash metal, and post-hardcore.

== Horror punk ==
Horror punk mixes Gothic and punk rock sounds with morbid or violent imagery and lyrics, which are often influenced by horror films or science fiction B-movies. The genre is similar to, and sometimes overlaps with, deathrock, although horror punk music is typically more aggressive and melodic than deathrock. Some horror punk bands dress up in black clothes, skeleton costumes, and skull face paint.

== Nazi punk ==
Nazi punk (also known as hatecore) is punk rock styled music that promotes neo-Nazism. Rock Against Communism is a related genre. It is agreed upon that Nazi punk is rejected by the community for its anti-thetical messaging.^{[1][2]} Therefore, it is generally agreed upon that Nazi punk is not a punk subgenre.

== Oi! ==
Oi! is a working class street-level subgenre of punk rock that originated in the United Kingdom in the 1970s. It had a goal of uniting punks, skinheads, and other working class youths.

== Peace punk ==
Peace punk is a subgenre of punk rock with anti-war lyrics. The lyrics in peace punk advocate nonviolence and also often equality, freedom, animal liberation, veganism, ecology, human rights and anarchy. The lyrics are against racism, sexism, homophobia, war, poverty, capitalism, the government and the military. Most peace punk bands are also anarcho-punk bands.

== Proto-punk ==
Proto-punk (or protopunk) is music that foreshadowed the punk rock genre and sensibilities of the punk movement, particularly rock music artists during the 1960s and early-to mid 1970s. A retrospective label, the musicians involved were generally not originally associated with each other and came from a variety of backgrounds and styles; together, they anticipated many of punk's musical and thematic attributes.

== Punk pathetique ==
Punk pathetique or Fun punk is a subgenre of British punk rock (principally active circa 1980–1982) that involved humour and working class cultural themes. Musically it was related to (and had crossover with) the Oi! subgenre.

== Queercore ==
Queercore is a subgenre of punk that emerged in the 1980s after the publication of the zine J.D.s in Toronto. As a genre, queercore explores issues of gender identity, gender expression, and sexuality. Festivals such as Queeruption feature music, art, film, performance art and DIY-aesthetic.

== Riot Grrrl ==
Riot Grrrl is a feminist punk/indie rock genre and subculture, whose popularity peaked in the 1990s. The subculture features elements such as female-centric bands, concerts and festivals; collectives, support groups, workshops, self-defense courses, activism and fanzines.

== Skate punk ==
Skate punk (also known as skatepunk, skate-punk, skate-thrash, surf punk, skate rock or skate-core) is a subgenre of punk that is derived from hardcore punk. Skate punk most often describes the sound of melodic hardcore bands from the 1990s with an aggressive sound, and similar-sounding modern bands. Skate videos have traditionally featured this aggressive style of punk rock.

== Street punk ==
Street punk is a working class subgenre of punk rock which emerged in the early 1980s, partly as a rebellion against the perceived artistic pretensions of the first wave of British punk. Street punk developed from the Oi! genre, and then continued to go beyond the confines of the original Oi! style.

== Taqwacore ==
Taqwacore is a punk rock subgenre dealing with Islam and its culture, originally conceived in Michael Muhammad Knight's 2003 novel The Taqwacores. The name is a portmanteau of hardcore and the Arabic word Taqwa, which is usually translated as "piety" or the quality of being "God-fearing". Although Muslim punk rock dates back to at least the 1979 founding of the British band Alien Kulture. Knight's novel was instrumental in encouraging the growth of a contemporary North American Muslim punk movement. Taqwacore bands often challenge Islam as it exists, promoting a very liberal-progressive agenda.

== Trallpunk ==
Trallpunk is a subgenre of punk known for fast drumming, a melodic sound and often politically oriented lyrics. It emerged from the late-1980s Swedish hardcore punk scene.

== Punk rock fusion subgenres ==
=== 2 Tone ===
2 Tone (or Two Tone) was a music genre created in England in the late 1970s by fusing elements of ska, punk rock, rocksteady, reggae and new wave. The 2 Tone sound was developed by young musicians in Coventry, West Midlands, England. The genre is the precursor of the third wave ska scene of the 1980s and 1990s.

=== Anti-folk ===
Anti-folk (sometimes antifolk or unfolk) is a subgenre of folk music and punk rock that seeks to subvert the earnestness of politically charged 1960s folk music. The defining characteristics of this anti-folk are difficult to identify, as they vary from one artist to the next. Nonetheless, the music tends to sound raw or experimental; it also generally mocks perceived seriousness and pretension in the established mainstream music scene.

=== Burning spirits ===
Burning spirits is a fusion genre of hardcore punk and heavy metal music, particular the sounds of the New wave of British heavy metal. The style is typified by drums and vocals inspired by hardcore, crust punk and D-beat, accompanied by heavy metal-style guitar harmonies and solos. Originating from the Japanese hardcore scene in the mid–to late 1980s, it began to form with bands including Gudon and Poison Arts. In the 1990s, the most influential works in the genre were released, notably: Bet On the Possibility (1991) by Death Side; Tetsuarei (1991) by Tetsu Arrey; Wind of Pain (1992) by Bastard and No Reason Why (1996) by Judgement. The genre's name was coined by Death Side vocalist Ishiya and Tetsu Arrey bassist Katsuta Tokuyuki, based on a quote by New Japan Pro-Wrestling wrestler Bruiser Brody, in reference to Antonio Inoki.

The style went on to influence bands outside of Japan, such as Devil Master and Integrity, as well as the neo-crust genre, including His Hero is Gone, From Ashes Rise and Tragedy. Additionally, some non-Japanese bands adopted the burning spirits style, including Selfish, Lifechain, Burial and the Holy Mountain.

=== Celtic punk ===
Celtic punk is punk rock fused with influences from Celtic music. Often, the bands add Celtic instruments such as bagpipes, fiddle, tin whistle, accordion, mandolin or banjo. Celtic punk bands often play covers of traditional Irish or Scottish folk songs, as well as original compositions.

=== Chicano punk ===
Chicano punk is music by punk bands of Mexican American ethnicity. The subgenre originated in Chicago's Pilsen and Little Village neighborhoods during the mid-1990s and later spread to the Los Angeles punk scene.

=== Cowpunk ===
Cowpunk (also known as country punk) combines punk rock with country music in sound, subject matter, attitude, and style. The term has also been applied to several bands that play a fast form of Southern rock.

=== Dance-punk ===
Dance-punk (also known as disco punk, funk punk or indie-dance) mixes punk rock with disco, funk and electro music. Emerging in the late 1970s, it is influenced by the post-punk and No Wave movements and, more recently, the post-punk revival and art punk movements.

=== Dark cabaret ===
Dark cabaret may be a simple description of the theme and mood of a cabaret performance, but more recently has come to define a particular musical genre which draws on the aesthetics of the decadent, risqué German Weimar-era cabarets, burlesque and vaudeville shows with the stylings of post-1970s goth and punk music.

=== Folk punk ===
Folk punk combines elements of folk music and punk rock. Its subgenres include Celtic punk and Gypsy punk. Folk punk generally takes one of two forms: either traditional folk music played in a punk rock style, or music incorporating the themes of punk rock but played on acoustic instruments (sometimes adding additional folk instruments such as mandolins, accordions, banjos or violins).

=== Grindcore ===
Grindcore is an extreme fusion genre of heavy metal and hardcore punk that originated in the mid-1980s, drawing inspiration from abrasive-sounding musical styles, such as thrashcore, crust punk, hardcore punk, extreme metal, and industrial. Grindcore is considered a more noise-filled style of hardcore punk while using hardcore's trademark characteristics such as heavily distorted, down-tuned guitars, grinding overdriven bass, high-speed tempo, blast beats, and vocals which consist of growls, shouts and high-pitched shrieks.

=== Gypsy punk ===
Gypsy punk mixes traditional Romani music, Klezmer and Eastern European folk music with punk rock. It typically features violin, acoustic guitar, accordion, and tenor saxophone, along with electric guitar, bass, and drums.

=== Latin punk ===
Latin Punk is a subgenre of punk rock influenced by Latin American Rock en Español, Latino punk, Ska, and regional musical genres such as Bossa Nova, Samba, Cumbia and Boleros, among others. Although originally a subgenre born in the Latin Americas and Spain, the Latin Punk subgenre has grown internationally, providing Latin rock musicians abroad a connection to their roots.

=== Metalcore ===
Metalcore is a broadly defined music genre combining elements of heavy metal and hardcore punk, originating in the 1990s United States and becoming popular in the 2000s. Metalcore typically has aggressive verses and melodic choruses, combined with slow, intense passages called breakdowns. Other defining traits are low-tuned, percussive guitar riffs, double bass drumming, and highly polished production. Vocalists typically switch between clean vocals (melodic, emotional singing) and harsh vocals (including shouting and screaming). Lyrics are often personal, introspective and emotive. It is debated whether metalcore is a subgenre of metal and hardcore, or a genre of its own. Many metalheads do not regard metalcore as a heavy metal subgenre.

=== Pop-punk ===
Pop-punk (also known as punk-pop and other names) is a fusion genre that combines elements of punk rock with pop music and/or power pop, to varying degrees. It is not clear when the term pop-punk was first used, but pop-influenced punk rock had been around since the mid- to late-1970s.

=== Psychobilly ===
Psychobilly has its roots primarily in two genres: American rockabilly of the 1950s and the punk rock of the late 1970s and early 1980s. First mentioned as a term in the Johnny Cash song "One Piece at a Time", psychobilly mixes the rhythm and melody of rockabilly with the aggression and energy of punk music. The lyrics are often about horror films, stories about psychopaths, monsters and science fiction. The Cramps and the Meteors are regarded as pioneers and founders of this fusion genre, which is played classically with (hollowbody) guitar, double bass (with slap technique) and drums.

=== Punk blues ===
Punk blues is a fusion of punk rock, blues rock and blues music. It also can be influenced by garage rock.

=== Punk jazz ===
Punk jazz describes the amalgamation of elements of the jazz tradition (usually free jazz and jazz fusion of the 1960s and 1970s) with the instrumentation or conceptual heritage of punk rock and hardcore punk.

=== Punk metal ===
Punk metal fuses elements of heavy metal music with punk rock. Bands described as punk metal include Amen, Motörhead, Warfare, Corrosion of Conformity, Manic Street Preachers, English Dogs, Sum 41, and L7.

=== Rapcore ===
Rapcore is a fusion genre, combining elements of hardcore punk and hip hop music. The two genres have a shared history, originating from oppressed, marginalized and disenfranchised young people, despite generally having distinctly separate ethno-cultural roots. During the 1980s, Chuck D, of hip hop group Public Enemy, was inspired by Black Flag vocalist Henry Rollins, while Beastie Boys began as a hardcore band, before transitioning into hip hop despite retaining their hardcore influence. Furthermore, many bands in the New York hardcore scene at this time began incorporating elements of hip hop.

Rapcore was pioneered by acts including Biohazard, Dog Eat Dog, downset., E.Town Concrete and Every Day Life. Notable subsequent acts include Deez Nuts, Fever 333 and Stray From the Path.

=== Scottish Gaelic punk ===
Scottish Gaelic punk is a subgenre of punk rock in which bands sing some or all of their music in Scottish Gaelic. The Gaelic punk scene is, in part, an affirmation of the value of minority languages and cultures. Gaelic punk bands express political views, particularly those related to anarchism and environmentalism.

=== Ska punk and ska-core ===
Ska punk is a fusion music genre that combines ska and punk rock, often playing down the former's R&B roots. Ska-core is a subgenre of ska punk, blending ska with hardcore punk. The more punk-influenced style often features faster tempos, guitar distortion, onbeat punk-style interludes (usually the chorus), and nasal, gruff, or shouted vocals. The more ska-influenced style features a more developed instrumentation and a cleaner vocal and musical sound.

=== Spanish raw punk ===
Spanish raw punk is punk fused with the combination of Spanish punk and d-beat. The genre is also very rare and underground due to the level of demonstration. Often, bands add some type of crude lyrics in which they protest against police brutality, religion and government.

=== Synthpunk ===
Synthpunk (also known as Electropunk) is a music genre combining elements of electronic music and punk rock. A number of bands use electronics and punk music together although the methods and resulting sounds can differ greatly. This has even led to the creation of more genres such as digital hardcore.

== See also ==
- Punk subculture
- Solarpunk
- List of hardcore punk subgenres
- Heavy metal genres
- List of rock genres
