= Madame Germen =

Spanish band

- Origin: A Coruña, Galicia, Spain
- Genres: Emo-crust; crust punk; emoviolence; neocrust
- Years active: 2002–2005
- Past members: Paul David Silva Pérez; Reuben; César; Fernando Mejuto; Kike; Miki

Madame Germen was a Spanish punk rock band from A Coruña, Galicia. Formed in 2002, Madame Germen's merger of crust punk and French screamo helped to pioneer the emo-crust genre and establish a prominent crust punk scene in A Coruña. During their final years, they relocated to Chemnitz, Germany. They disbanded in 2005. On their posthumously released album Invocacion A Morte (2006), they had begun to take influence from His Hero is Gone, a fusion which pioneered the neo-crust genre.

== History ==
Madame Germen formed in the north Spanish port city of A Coruña, Galicia, in 2002. Their name was coined in reference to Rihab Taha, an Iraqi microbiologist who the United Nations dubbed "Dr Germ". The band's members viewed the United States government's accusation of her developing an Iraqi biological weapons program made her a scapegoat. They used the French feminine title "madame" instead of "doctor" to reference their influence from French screamo bands such as An-Attâ and Anomie. Their first live performance was the final show put on at A Coruña venue Okupa da Ría, alongside Consumatum Est, Ekkaia and 25 Comin’ Fire. Their rehearsal space was in A Coruña's Monte Alto neighbourhead, which they shared with Ekkaia, Hassasin, SLS3, Hongo and Nashgul.

On 5 May 2003, they released their debut album As Cicatrizes Do Paraiso, through the record label Dias De Juventud. In Autumn 2004, Yellow Dog Records revealed that Madame Germen's next record would soon be released through the label and that the band would headline a tour of Europe at the same time. It was released as their self-titled album that year.

Later in their career, the band relocated to Chemnitz, Germany, where they lived in the squat venue B-Hof. Their third album Invocación Á Morte was released in 2005, they disbanded that year. Members went on to form Black Panda, Ictus and Cop on Fire.

== Musical style ==
Critics categorised Madame Germen's music as emo-crust, crust punk, D-beat, post-crust, doom crust, emoviolence, and crustcore. They incorporated elements of post-hardcore. Their sound was a depressive take on hardcore punk that makes use of violin interludes and atmospheric elements, incorporating dark melodies vocals influenced by screamo, layered screams, doom metal riffs erratic, emotional singing and melodic hardcore-inspired guitars. Their lyrics discussed politics and humanity, and were written in the reintegrationism strain of the Galician language.

They cited their main influences as their A Coruña contemporaries Ekkaia and the French screamo of An-Attâ and Anomie. Other influences included Envy, Botch, Neurosis and Stretch Arm Strong. On Invocacion A Morte (2006), they began to take influence from His Hero is Gone, At the Gates and Breach, which pivoted their sound to neocrust.

=== Legacy ===
Madame Germen helped to popularise the A Coruña hardcore amongst touring bands, as a part of a wave that also included Ekkaia, Nashgul, SL'S3, Hongo, Cop On Fire and Hashassin. Alongside Ekkaia, they pioneered the fusion genre emo-crust. However, the band rejected this title and denied any influence upon it. In a 2024 interview with DIY Conspiracy, Paul David Silva Pérez he stated "I personally rejected this style of music completely, and the word “emo” as a prefix to anything caused me so much repulsion that I even got rid of many albums that could be related to this musical genre, in all its forms. I saw that everything became part of a trend, and although there were very good bands, I wasn’t interested in them." Emo-crust emerged at the same time as the melodic crust sound of United States bands such as later His Hero is Gone and early Tragedy, which was influenced by the Japanese hardcore style burning spirits. Following Ekkaia and Tragedy's 2002 tour, bands from both style began to take influence from the other. This style was soon termed neo-crust by Alerta Antifascista records founder Timo Nehmtow, and saw widespread popularity in the punk scene during the mid-2000s. By the end of the decade, the sound had decline in popularity. They subsequently helped to establish a neo-crust scene in Galicia with Hongo, Ekkaia, Ictus, Blunt and URSUS.

They have been cited as an influence by Fall of Efrafa.

== Members ==
- Paul David Silva Pérez – vocals
- Reuben – bass
- César – guitar
- Fernando Mejuto – drums
- Kike – guitar
- Miki – violin (2002–2003)
