= Archivist (band) =

European post-metal musical group

- Origin: Europe
- Genres: Post-metal; post-hardcore; black metal; science fiction
- Years active: 2014–present
- Labels: Alerta Antifascista; Halo of Flies
- Spinoff of: Light Bearer
- Members: Gerfried; Matthias; Steff; Alex CF; Anna; Hannes

Archivist are a European post-metal band formed in 2014. The band comprises four Austrian instrumentalists, English vocalist and artist Alex CF, and German vocalist Anna. They have produced a trilogy of concept albums—Archivist (2015), Construct (2017), and Triumvirate (2019)—which follows an epic science fiction narrative created by Alex. The eponymous Archivist is "the unwitting survivor of a massive ecological disaster. The last human alive, yet in relative safety aboard the only remaining ark jettisoned from a dying Earth, she begins to record her memories of the world left in turmoil by humanity's shortsightedness and greed." She shares the spaceship with an artificial intelligence, Construct. Together they are the sole survivors of total destruction between humans and machines.

== History ==
Guitarists Gerfried and Matthias had played together in the hardcore punk band Plague Mass. From 2011 to 2014, Gerfried lived in London and played with Alex CF in the hardcore band Carnist and the post-metal band Light Bearer. Alex is a writer and artist who creates mythological stories and visual art with often environmental themes. He has fronted a number of "concept bands", including Fall of Efrafa (2005–2009), Momentum (2011–2013), and Light Bearer (2010–2014). Since 2014, he performs with Archivist, Anopheli (alongside Anna), and Morrow (alongside Gerfried), all of them conceptually related.

Upon returning from London to Austria, Gerfried formed a new band with Matthias, recruiting Steff (whom they knew from his screamo band Dimirij) as a drummer. They initially wanted a German-speaking vocalist, but Alex pitched them the Archivist narrative, which he had created long before and thought a good fit to their "ethereal driving" sound with "broad and operatic" melodies. He then brought on Anna (formerly of German post-metal band Amber) as a second voice.

Archivist's self-titled debut album was released on 4 June 2015. It was recorded and mixed by Nickl Gruber and mastered by Oskar Karlsson. On 23 February 2017, the band followed up with Construct, which was recorded and mixed by Gruber in Graz and mastered by Cristian Varga. Physical releases have been handled by Alerta Antifascista and in the US by Halo of Flies. A final album, Triumvirate, was released in April 2019.

== Artistry ==
=== Concept ===
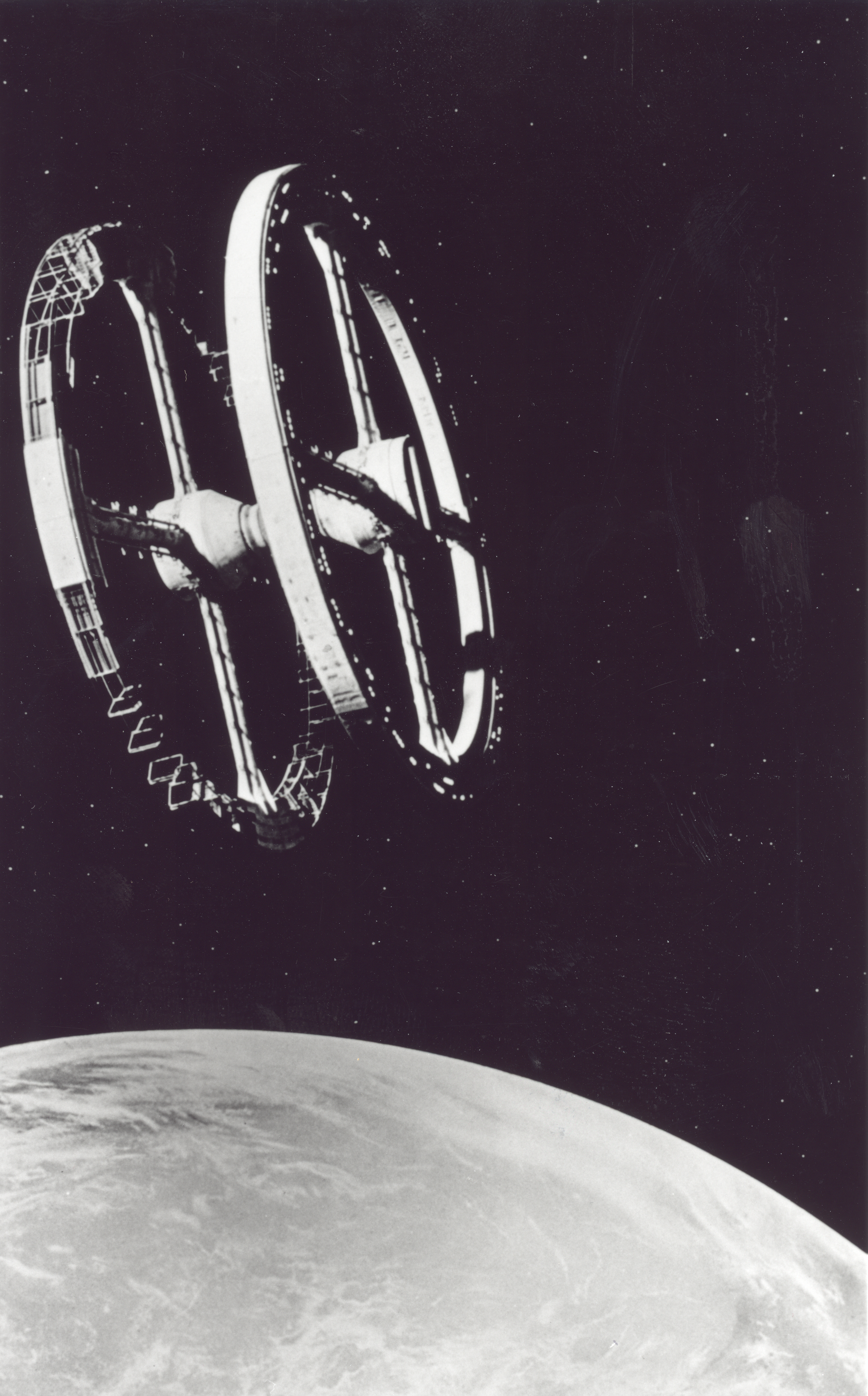
Stanley Kubrick's 1968 epic science fiction film 2001: A Space Odyssey influenced the band's artistry.

In a 2017 interview, Alex explained:

The basic premise is one of human hubris, trying to control our technology, which backfires when it claims personhood. This ends in mutual annihilation, except for a stowaway on a ship – the Archivist, and an AI built into the ship – Construct. Both are the lone survivors of their respective species, and in the wake of their peoples destruction they must find some kind of purpose, and yet they are unable to, set adrift in the endless expanse of space. The AI wishes to find the source of its creator and delves into some theological and philosophical digressions, whilst the Archivist is put in stasis for 2000 years. It is both a story of duality – how they both find purpose in one another, but also one of machine Gods, existential crisis, religion and belief.

Archivist shares a fictional universe with Alex and Gerfried's crust punk band Morrow, "playing out from different millennia. They are entirely separate bands, but they are linked by ancestors and descendants of the Archivist." In a 2018 interview, Alex elaborated that "Morrow and Archivist exist at opposite ends of a story and will finish when they meet in the middle, on [Triumvirate]. Morrow has other stories to tell after this, what we do with Archivist is unknown at this stage." He also stated:

My role in compositions is usually colours and moods, which the lyrics convey, I will describe the story to the other band members and to some extent the rhythms and tempos reflect that. I think the music I have been a part of always has a similar feel to it, mainly due to shared members and interests and often this singular goal. ... I have never set out for music to be anything more than exercising ideas, and to tell stories.

=== Style and influences ===
In a review of Construct, Matt Butler of Echoes and Dust described its sound as "atmospheric post-metal" with dystopian themes, characterized by "squalls of blackened guitar, post-hardcore barks and blast beats" but also "stunning shimmers of major-key riffage [and] ... clean vocals [that] break through the storm". Like Butler, Andy Synn of No Clean Singing suggested that Construct's coherence suffered from the sheer scope of the concept, but both praised the band's ability to "seamlessly transition between breathy, ethereal ambience and searing metallic catharsis" as well as the overall power of the album. Butler likened it to Oathbreaker, Astronoid, Amenra, and Cult of Luna, while Synn noted similarities to Alcest and Anathema.

In 2017, Gerfried cited Stanley Kubrick's 2001: A Space Odyssey as a major influence on Archivist. Musically the band is eclectic, with backgrounds ranging "from indie to hardcore/punk to metal"; Gerfried mentioned the Smiths as a personal favorite while Alex mentioned Neurosis.

== Members ==
- Gerfried – guitar, backing vocals
- Matthias – guitar, backing vocals, synthesizers
- Steff – drums
- Alex CF – vocals, art, lyrics
- Anna – vocals
- Hannes – bass

== Discography ==
- Archivist (2015)
- Construct (2017)
- Triumvirate (2019)
