= Victims (band) =

Swedish hardcore punk band

- Origin: Nyköping, Sweden
- Genres: Hardcore punk, d-beat, crust punk
- Years active: 1997–2022
- Labels: Yellow Dog, Havoc, Deathwish Inc.
- Members: Johan Eriksson; Andy Henriksson; Jon Lindqvist; Gareth Smith
- Past members: Andy Söderström; Marcus Strandberg
- Website: www.victimsinblood.com

Victims were a Swedish hardcore punk band, originally hailing from Nyköping, at the end of their career they were based in Stockholm. The final line-up consisted of lead vocalist and bass player Johan Eriksson, drummer Andy Henriksson, guitar player, vocalist Jon Lindqvist and guitar player Gareth Smith.

Since their 1997 inception, the band released seven LPs and two EPs, through labels like Havoc Records, La Familia, Deathwish, Tankcrimes, Relapse and more. They also have appeared on splits with From Ashes Rise, Kylesa, and Acursed. They toured internationally, heavily focused on Europe and the US, including tours with Coliseum, Kylesa, Trash Talk, Rotten Sound, Trap Them, Municipal Waste, Black Breath, and many others.

Victims' style of d-beat/hardcore crust punk was comparable to Anti-Cimex, Wolfpack/Wolfbrigade, From Ashes Rise, Disfear and the like, and they were one of the most respected bands of the underground punk and hardcore community.

== Biography ==
Victims formed in 1997 in Nyköping, Sweden. The original line-up consisted of Johan Eriksson on vocals, Andy Henriksson on drums, Andy Söderström on bass and Marcus Strandberg on guitar. With this lineup in 1997 the band recorded a seven songs demo, reissued in 1999 as an EP titled Harder Than It Was Meant to Be, a split EP with Acursed in 1999 and their debut album Neverendinglasting in 2001 on German label Yellow Dog Records.

Shortly after the release of Neverendinglasting, guitarist Marcus left the band and was replaced by Acursed guitar player Jon Lindqvist. In 2003 they released a split LP with American crust punk act From Ashes Rise and in 2004 their second album, ...In Blood, both on Havoc Records. After the Release of ...In Blood, Victims embarked on their first US tour.

Their third album, Divide and Conquer, released in 2006 on Havoc Records, is described by the band as rougher and trashier. This is the first album not being produced by Mieszko Talarczyk, frontman for the band Nasum, who died during the 2004 Indian Ocean earthquake and tsunami. They subsequently toured in the US and in Europe with Another Breath. Divide and Conquer is also the last record that features original bass player Andy Söderström.

After the departure of Söderström, vocalist Johan Eriksson started to play the bass, handling both vocals and bass duties, transforming the band into a power trio. In 2008 the band released their fourth album titled Killer. To promote the album the band toured extensively both in the United States and in Europe, sharing the stage with bands like Coliseum, Rotten Sound, Trash Talk, Trap Them and The Ocean.

This era marked the addition of a second guitarist Gareth Smith, formerly of Raging Speedhorn, a long time acquaintance of Eriksson.

With this new line-up Victims got back on the road and toured the US with Trap Them and Black Breath. They also toured Europe with Municipal Waste and appeared at some festivals such as Obscene Extreme. In 2008 Victims recorded an EP titled Lies, Lies, Lies and in 2009 a split EP with Kylesa.

Following this, Victims released their albums A Dissident (produced by Nico Elgstrand of Entombed) in 2011 with Deathwish and La Familia and in 2016 Sirens (recorded and produced by Fred Estby of Dismember) with Tankcrimes and Deathwish.

In 2019, Victims signed with renowned metal label Relapse Records for the release of their seventh full-length album The Horse and Sparrow Theory. It was recorded by producer Karl Daniel Lidén (Bloodbath, Katatonia, Craft and more).

On 25 February 2022 they announced an "indefinite hiatus" on their website, Facebook and Instagram in a message titled "THIS IS THE END – WE ARE DEAD".

== Influences ==
The band credits Discharge, Motörhead and American hardcore bands from the 80s as influential for its sound.

== Members ==
Final

- Johan Eriksson – lead vocals (1997–present); bass (2006–present)
- Andy Henriksson – drums (1997–present)
- Jon Lindqvist – guitar, vocals (2002–present)
- Gareth Smith – guitar (2008–present)

Previous

- Marcus Strandberg – guitar (1997–2001)
- Andy Söderström – bass (1997–2006)

== Discography ==
Studio albums

- Neverendinglasting (Yellow Dog/Scorched Earth Policy, 2001)
- ...In Blood (Havoc, 2004)
- Divide and Conquer (Havoc, 2006)
- Killer (Deathwish/Combat Rock Industry, 2008)
- A Dissident (Deathwish/La Familia/Tankcrimes, 2011)
- Sirens (Tankcrimes, 2016)
- The Horse and Sparrow Theory (Relapse, 2019)

Extended plays

- Harder Than It Was Meant to Be (Yellow Dog, 1999)
- Lies, Lies, Lies (Deathwish, 2008)

Split albums

- Split EP with Acursed (Putrid Filth Conspiracy, 1999)
- Split LP with From Ashes Rise (Havoc, 2003)
- Split EP with Kylesa (La Familia, 2009)
