= Skarp (band) =

- Origin: Seattle, WA, U.S.
- Genres: Grindcore; Crust Punk; Hardcore punk
- Years active: 1999 - present
- Label: Alternative Tentacles
- Members: Renae Betts; Robert Daniels; Andrew Kress; Joe Axler
- Past members: Brent McKnight; Eric Brosy; Tim Lewis
- Website: Official MySpace Site

Skarp is a grindcore band from Seattle, Washington, United States. The band has released one split EP with Human Error, one EP, and two full-length studio albums. The band has been heavily influenced by Choking Victim.

== History ==
The band was formed by former David Koresh Choir members Renae and Robert in 1999, and they were soon joined by Brent McKnight of Act of Heresy on bass and Eric Brose of Crisis Rebirth on drums. Brose was soon replaced by Joe Axler on drums, with Brose moving to second guitar. The line-up stabilized when McKnight left to concentrate on the November Group, with Brose leaving soon after. Skarp continued as a three-piece for six months, Tim Lewis joined on bass, and this line-up played on the band's first release. When Tim was injured, Andrew Kress joined to replace him.

The band have released two albums, the first Bury Your Dead in 2004, subsequently signing to Alternative Tentacles after touring Europe in support of The Melvins, and releasing the Billy Anderson-produced Requiem in late 2005.

Drummer Joe Axler is also a member of Portland-based Splatterhouse and played on Book of Black Earth's 2006 album The Feast.

== Musical style ==
The band have labelled their style "blackout grind", combining elements of hardcore punk, crust punk, grindcore, and metal.

== Members ==
- Renae Betts - vocals
- Robert Daniels - guitar
- Andrew Kress - bass guitar
- Joe Axler - drums

=== Former members ===
- Brent McKnight - bass guitar
- Eric Brose - drums
- Tim Lewis- bass guitar

== Discography ==
=== Studio albums ===
- Bury Your Dead (2004), Inimical
- Requiem (2005), Alternative Tentacles

=== EPs ===
- Split EP with Human Error (2001)
- Skarp EP (2003)
