= Downfall of Gaia =

Extreme metal band

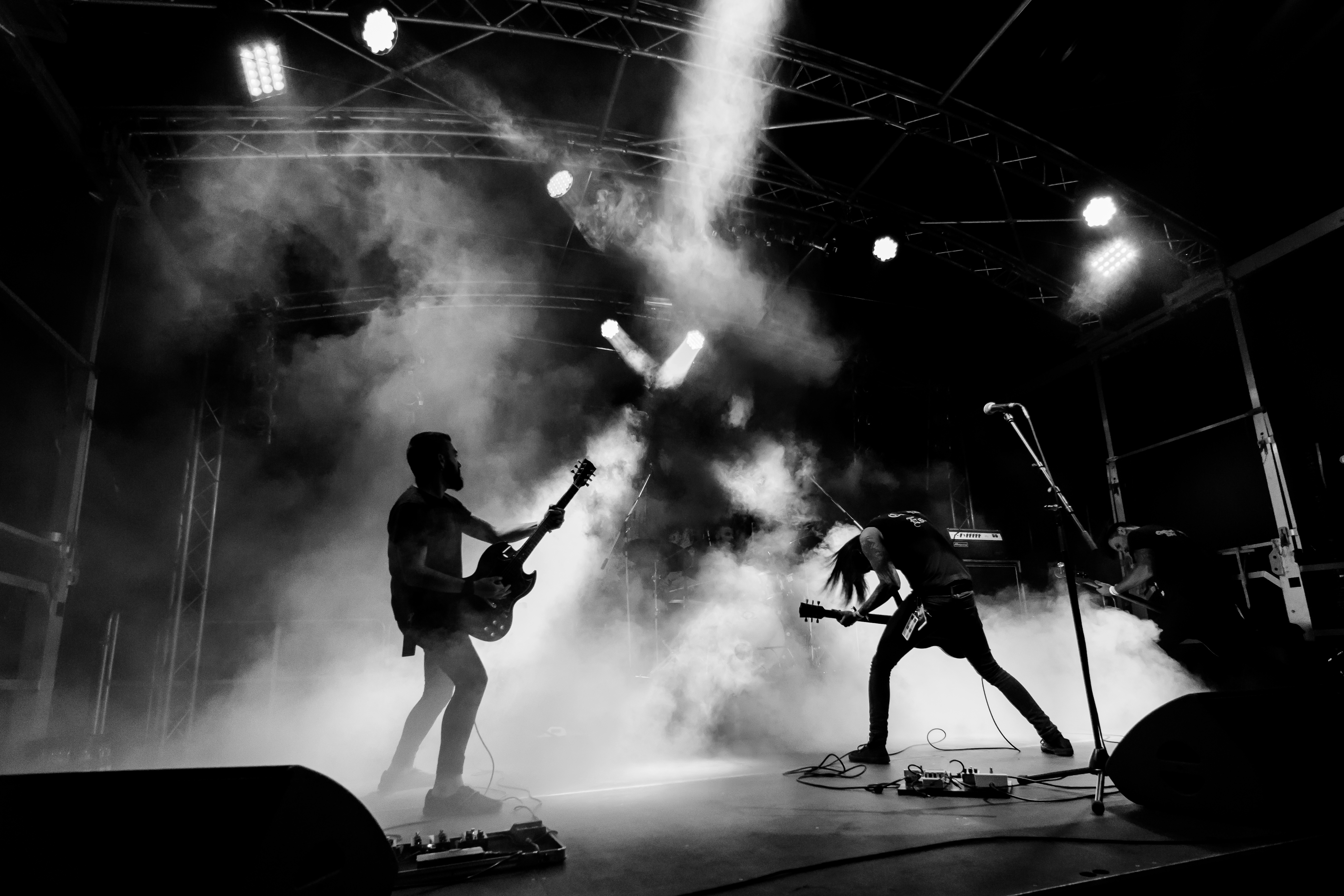
- Downfall of Gaia at Summer Breeze Open Air 2016. From left to right: Marco Mazzola, Michael Kadnar (back), Dominik Goncalves dos Reis, Anton Lisovoj.

Background information
- Origin: Germany
- Genres: Black metal; post-metal; sludge metal; crust punk
- Years active: 2008–present
- Labels: Metal Blade; Alerta Antifascista; Moment of Collapse; Shove
- Members: Dominik Goncalves dos Reis; Anton Lisovoj; Peter Wolff; Michael Kadnar
- Past members: Marco Mazzola; Sven; Hannes
- Website: downfallofgaia.com

Downfall of Gaia are a German extreme metal band formed in 2008 by Dominik Goncalves dos Reis (vocals, guitar) and Anton Lisovoj (vocals, bass). Their current lineup is completed by drummer Michael Kadnar and guitarist Peter Wolff. They have released six studio albums, transforming their initial crust punk sound through the incorporation of black metal, doom metal, and post-rock influences.

== History ==
=== Formation, early releases, and Suffocating in the Swarm of Cranes (2006–2013) ===
Dominik Goncalves dos Reis and Anton Lisovoj, who knew each other from their area, started writing music together in 2006, focused on d-beat and crust punk. In 2008, they shifted towards writing longer, "epic" songs with the ambition to make more "serious" music and changed their name to Downfall of Gaia to mark a transition cemented with the addition of a second guitarist, Peter Wolff, whom they had met that year. They chose the name, which refers to Gaia, the goddess that personifies the Earth in Greek mythology, to correspond with "the lyrics and the atmosphere" of their music. The band's first drummer was replaced by Sven, who in turn was replaced in 2010 by Hannes. They released one demo, The Downfall of Gaia, in 2008, followed in 2009 by a split tape with French band Kazan and the tour EP Salvation in Darkness. Their debut studio album, Epos, was released in 2010 with the help of several independent record labels, and was described by Goncalves as incorporating more doom metal and post-rock influences. In 2011, their split LP with Swedish band In the Hearts of Emperors came out on Alerta Antifascista Records, Moment of Collapse and Shove Records. The band began performing more extensively that year, touring the East Coast of the United States with Vestiges, besides Europe in October.

Downfall of Gaia finished writing for their sophomore album Suffocating in the Swarm of Cranes in early 2012 and were contacted by Metal Blade Records a few weeks before they were scheduled to record it; they parted ways with the independent labels and signed to Metal Blade, who released the album on 10 September 2012 in the US and 8 October in Europe. It was recorded with Christoph Scheideldorf at '79 Sound Studio in Cologne, mixed by Jack Shirley of Atomic Garden Studio in the San Francisco Bay Area and mastered by James Plotkin. Suffocating in the Swarm of Cranes is a concept album about a man suffering from depression and insomnia and his gradual descend into insanity. Hannes described its style as "mixed", with "influences from sludge, black metal, hardcore or even screamo parts or post rock parts", while Kim Kelly wrote in a Pitchfork review that compared to their older work, the album "relies far more heavily on Isis-inspired post-metal and mournful, cathartic black metal for inspiration" while retaining shades of Amebix-style crust punk. The band toured Europe with Vestiges in the summer of 2012 and returned to the US in 2013, a year in which they did more than 100 concerts. In 2014, they performed with bands such as Neurosis, Toxic Holocaust and Black Tusk as well as at Hellfest 2014, an appearance which Goncalves that year described, along with getting signed to Metal Blade, as a highlight of their career.

=== Aeon Unveils the Thrones of Decay, Atrophy, and Ethic of Radical Finitude (2014–present) ===
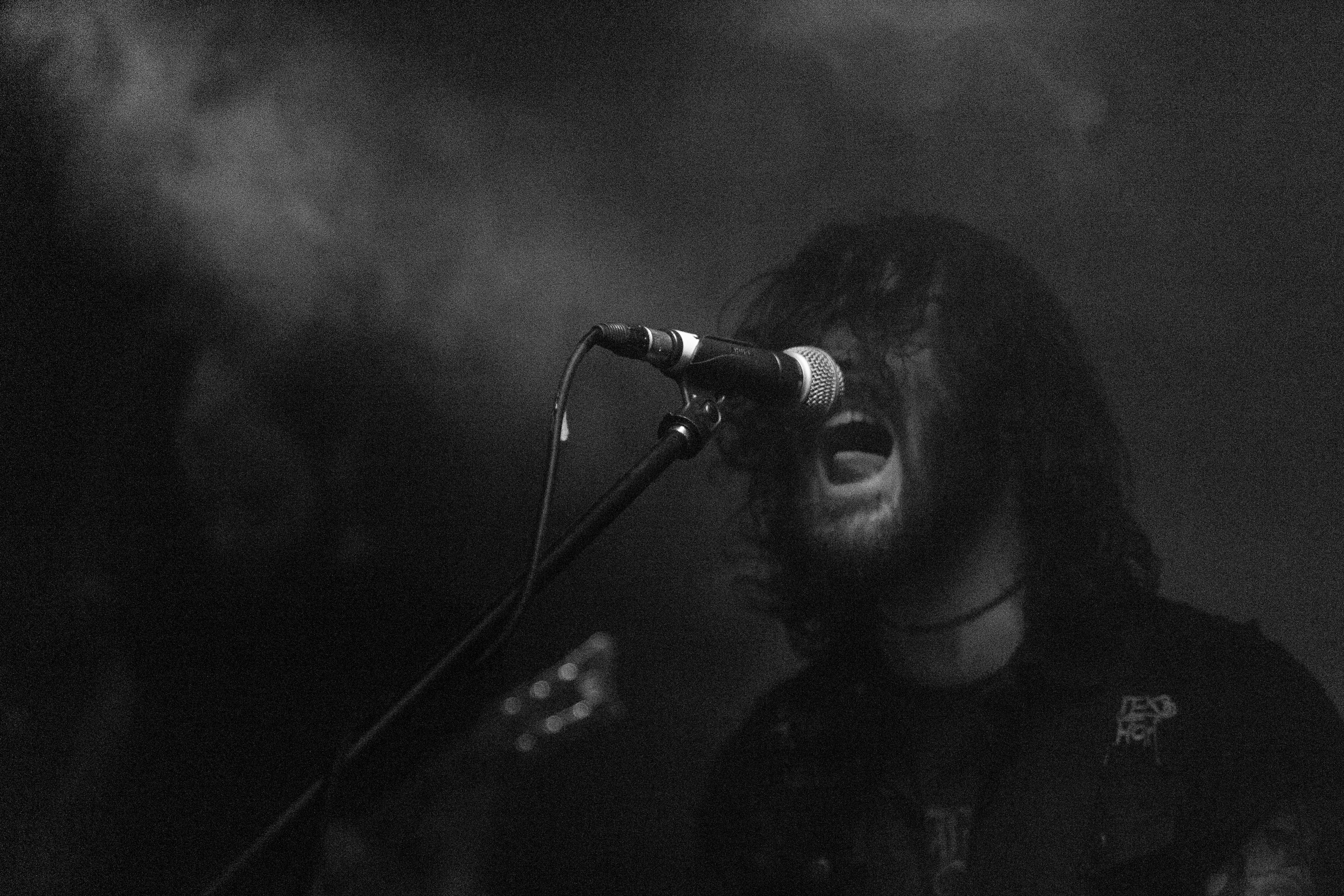
Peter Wolff (left) and Goncalves (right) at Roadburn Festival 2015

Downfall of Gaia's third studio album, Aeon Unveils the Thrones of Decay, was released on 11 November 2014 through Metal Blade. The songs were mostly created in two weeks of rehearsing and writing after the band's new drummer, Michael Kadnar from New York City who recently replaced Hannes, flew to Germany in March, while vocals were added a month later after Goncalves wrote the lyrics. The final version was recorded at '79 Sound Studio, mixed at Atomic Garden Studio and mastered at Audiosiege Studio in Portland, Oregon. Describing the record, Goncalves stated that it "is a concept album about time and all of its relentless sides ... deal[ing] with the darker sides of life and the struggles everyone has to fight on a day to day [basis]" and while "songs on [the band's] previous records grew slowly and things took their time, this time [they] tried to focus on pretty straight, fast and aggressive song structures." In support of the album, they toured the East Coast and the Midwest of the US in January/February 2015. and Europe with fellow German extreme metal band Der Weg einer Freiheit in March/April 2015. Further tours followed, including through Japan and Australia, only ending towards the end of the year when the band began working on their next album.

Wolff quit Downfall of Gaia in early 2016 to focus on new projects and private life and was replaced after a few auditions by Marco Mazzola from Berlin in April. The band's fourth studio album, Atrophy, was recorded in June 2016 at Hidden Planet Studio Berlin and mixed and mastered at Atomic Garden Studio. It was released through Metal Blade on 11 November 2016. On 8 February 2019, the band followed it up with their fifth, Ethic of Radical Finitude, through the same label.

== Musical style and influences ==
Downfall of Gaia's style, initially firmly rooted in crust punk, and then increasingly characterised by "longer, more grandiose, back-and-forth sweeping songs" has evolved over the course of their career. Following the 2014 release of Aeon Unveils the Thrones of Decay, it has been described as "experimental, sludge-infused black metal ... mixing second-wave black metal influences with progressive and atmospheric elements", as well as a "blend of post-metal riffs and black metal intensity" and "a mix of black metal, crusty grind bursts, sludge, and sprawling, sometimes doomy, post-metal". The band has been compared to Fall of Efrafa, Altar of Plagues and Agrimonia.

Around the same time, Dominik Goncalves dos Reis described the band as influenced initially by d-beat and crust punk and later mostly by doom metal, sludge metal and black metal, naming Agalloch, Neurosis, YOB, Electric Wizard and Wolves in the Throne Room as personal favorites, and Altar of Plagues, Watain, Thy Light and early Ulver (besides Wolves in the Throne Room and Agalloch) as the band's black metal influences. In 2012, he stated that Cult of Luna, Rosetta, Altar of Plagues, Neurosis and Mono were among their biggest influences. However, he noted on both occasions that they enjoy a wide variety of music genres, "from pop to electro to indie", one of his all-time favorite albums besides The Eye of Every Storm by Neurosis being Untrue by electronic musician Burial.

== Members ==
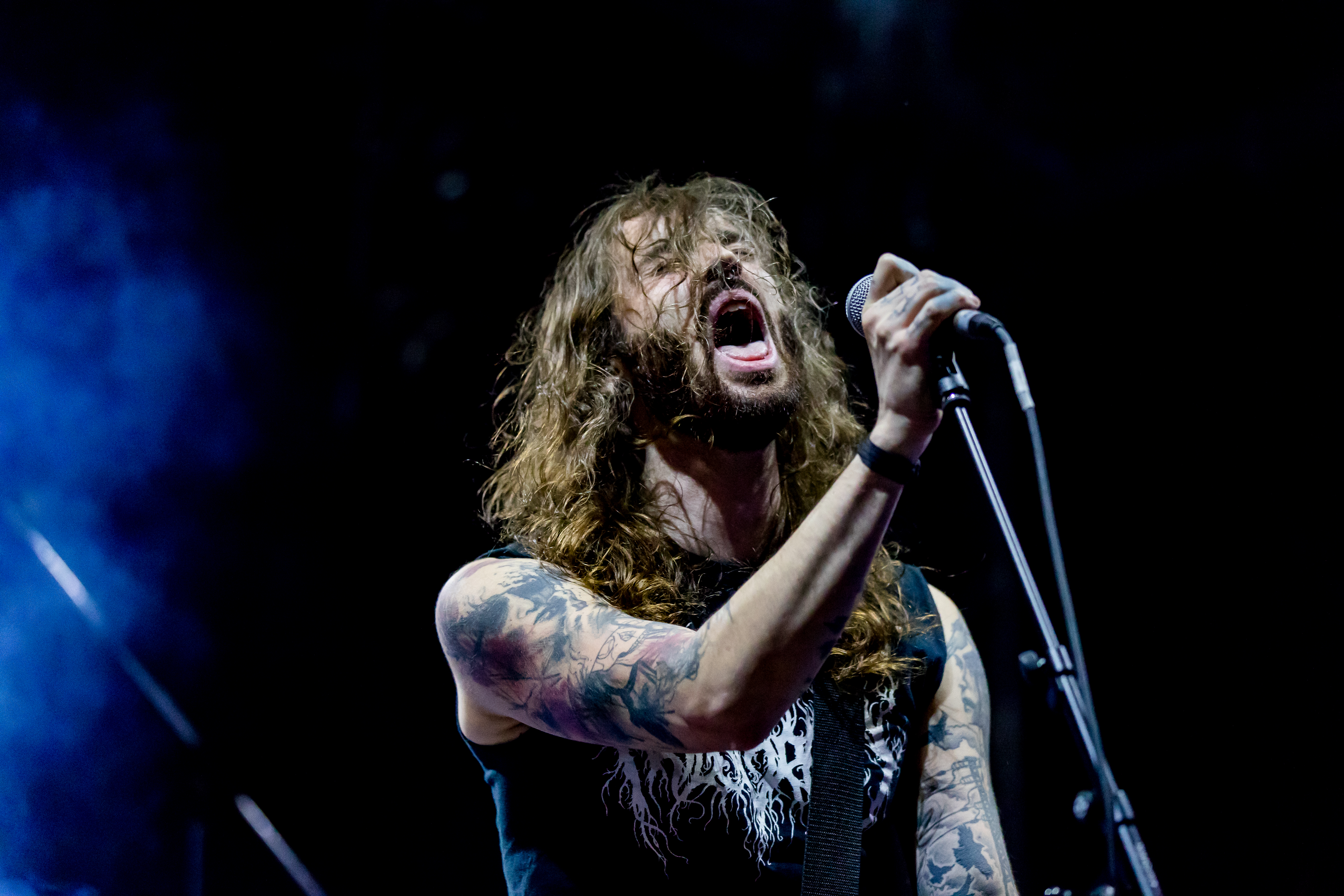
Dominik Goncalves dos Reis

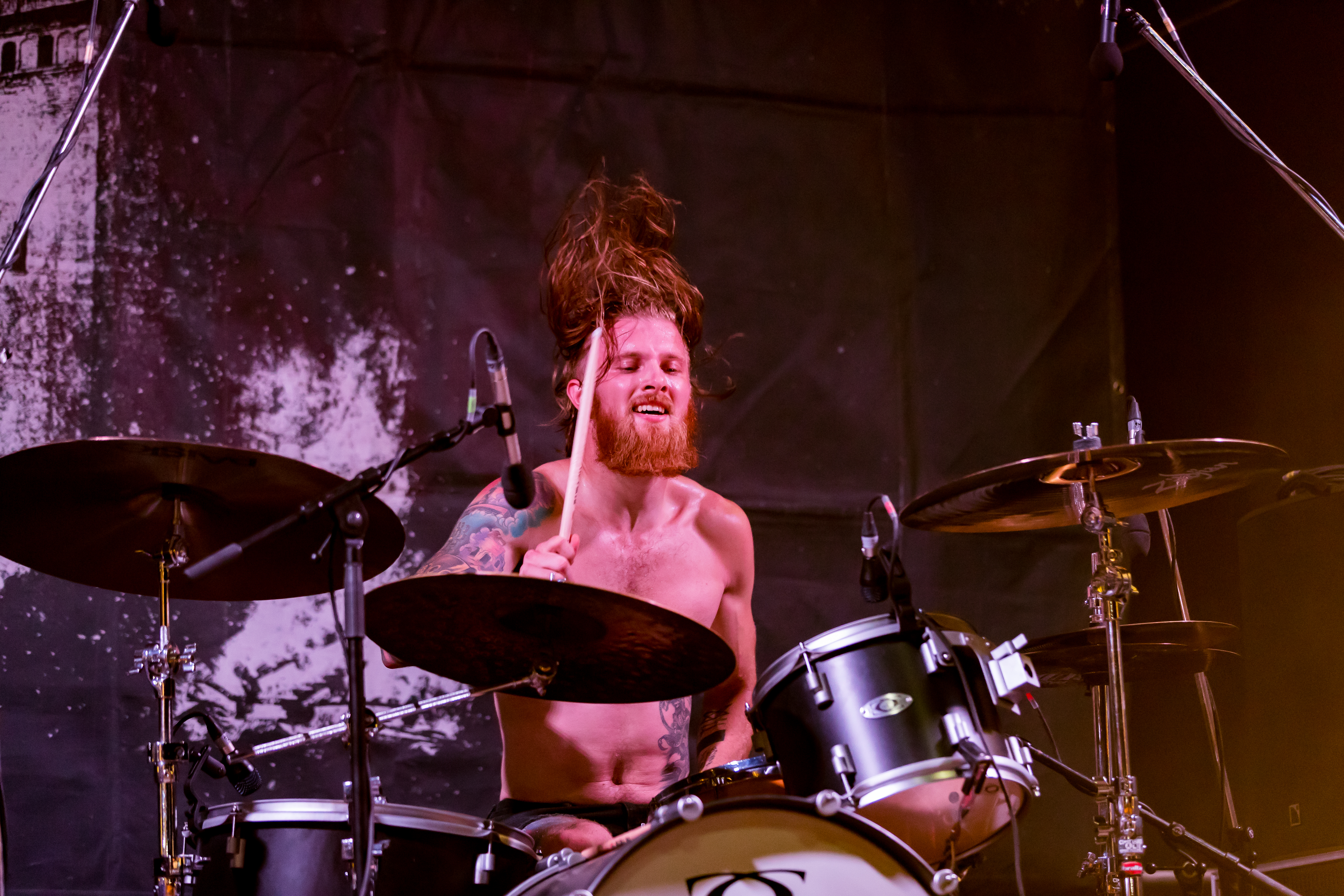
Michael Kadnar

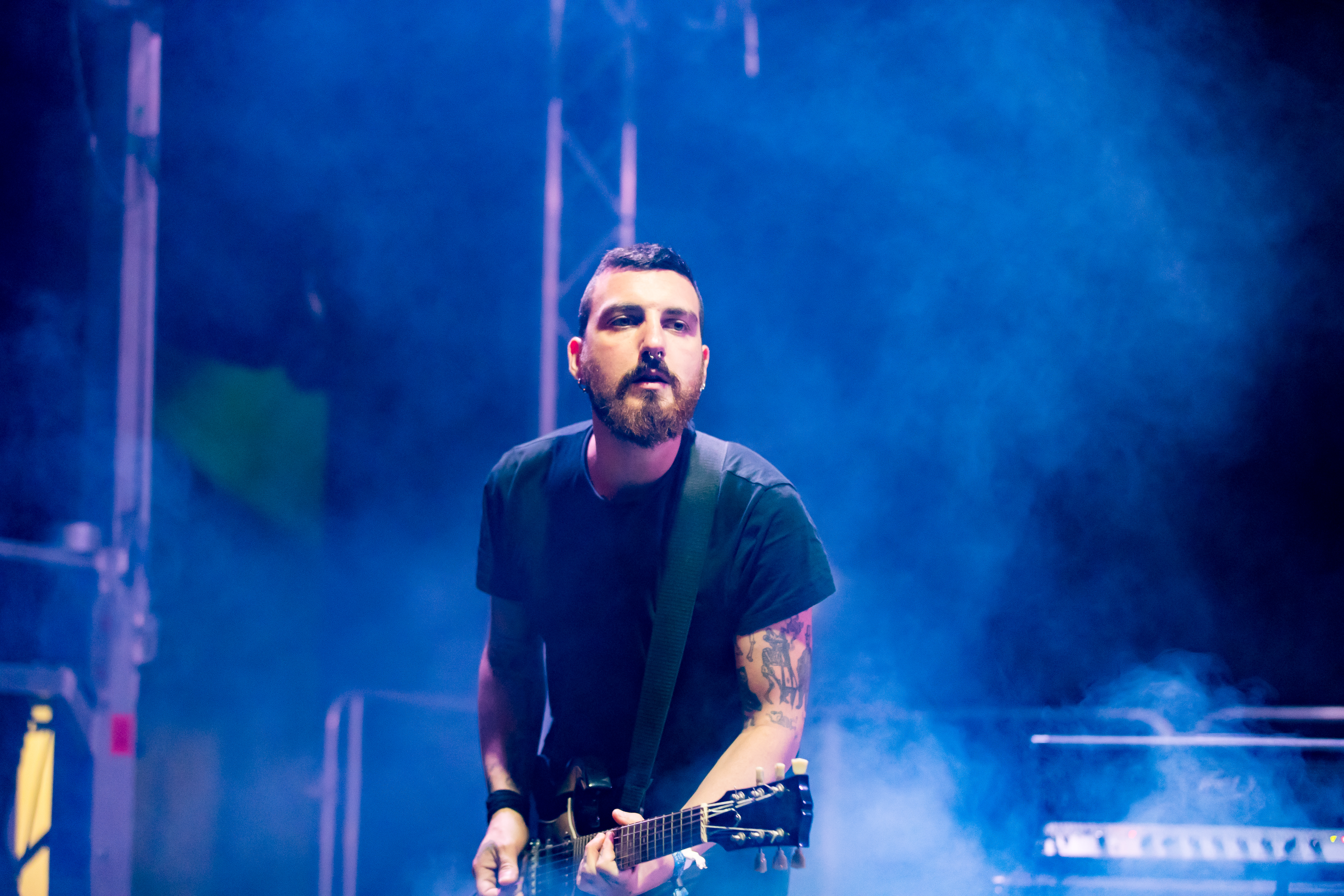
Marco Mazzola

Downfall of Gaia at Summer Breeze Open Air 2016

Current

- Dominik Goncalves dos Reis – vocals, guitar (2008–present)
- Anton Lisovoj – bass, vocals (2008–present)
- Peter Wolff – guitar, vocals (2008–2016, 2020–present)
- Michael Kadnar – drums (2014–present)

Former

- Sven – drums (2014)
- Johannes "Hannes" Stoltenburg – drums (2008–2014)
- Marco Mazzola – guitar (2016–2020)

Timeline

== Discography ==
Studio albums

- Epos (2010)
- Suffocating in the Swarm of Cranes (2012)
- Aeon Unveils the Thrones of Decay (2014)
- Atrophy (2016)
- Ethic of Radical Finitude (2019)
- Silhouettes of Disgust (2023)

EPs

- The Downfall of Gaia (2008 demo)
- Salvation in Darkness (2009)

Splits

- Downfall of Gaia / Kazan (2009)
- Downfall of Gaia / In the Hearts of Emperors (2011)

Compilations

- Downfall of Gaia (2013)
