= Disrupt =

American crust punk band

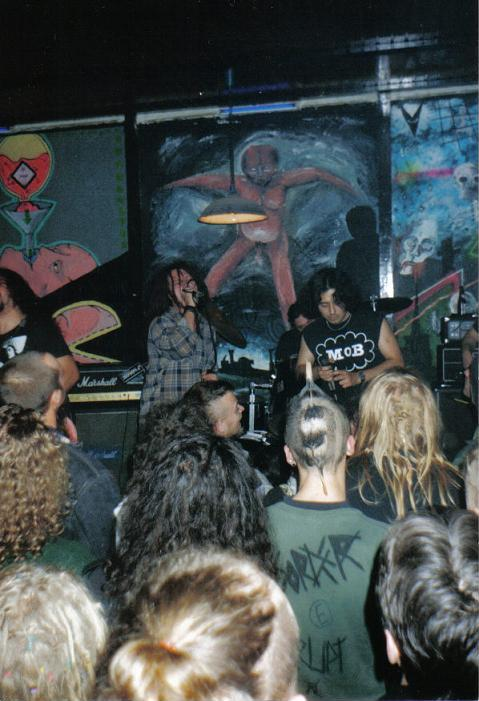
- Disrupt performing in 1992

Background information
- Origin: Lynn, Massachusetts, U.S.
- Genres: Crust punk; grindcore; hardcore punk
- Years active: 1987–1993
- Labels: Relapse
- Spinoffs: Grief
- Members: Jay Stiles; Pete Kamarinos; Jeff Hayward; Terry Savastano; Bob Palombo; Randy Odierno
- Past members: Chris Drake; Harry Haralabatos; Tony Leone; Brad Jones; Mike Williams; Scott Lucid; Kendal Treffery; Alyssa Murry

Disrupt was an American crust punk band from Lynn, Massachusetts, that was active from 1987 to 1993. The band acquired a cult following on the strength of several 7" records and compilation appearances, and have since been cited as legendary. Their lyrics were politically anarchist, expressing animal rights and anti-capitalist views.

== History ==
=== Formation, early years and first demo's (1987-1991) ===
The band formed in 1987 with the initial lineup consisting of Jay Stiles and Pete Kamarinos on vocal duties, Chris Drake on guitar, Harry Haralabatos on drums, and Tony Leone on bass. After recording one rehearsal demo, Leone and Haralabatos left the band. Brad Jones (drums) and Mike Williams (guitar) joined in the spring of 1988. However, Jones left the band a couple of months later, and Williams switched to drums. With this lineup, the band recorded a demo tape, titled Millions Die For Moneymaking, in November 1988.

In the spring of 1989, Williams and Drake left the band, and Haralabatos rejoined in order to record songs that were planned to be on a split 7" with Extreme Noise Terror. The band also recruited Scott Lucid to play bass. In October 1989, they recorded a 5-song demo, which was later re-released as a 7" self-titled EP in 1990.

Later that year, Scott Lucid left the band, and they acquired Bob Palombo to replace him. With Chris Drake rejoining the lineup, and Terry Savastano from the band Spasm contributing guitar duties, Disrupt recorded an 8-song album titled Refuse Planet, which was released as a 7" single by Relapse Records in 1991. They recorded another split 7" with Destroy in January of that year.

=== Split releases and Unrest (1991-1993) ===
Drake left the band once more in 1991, and was replaced by Jeff Hayward (of Unleashed Anger) on second guitar. About a week after Jeff joined the band, Haralabatos also quit, and Randy Odierno (of Temporary Insanity) replaced him.

With this lineup, the band entered the studio in 1992, and began recording songs for split releases with Disdain, Resist, Tuomiopäivän Lapset, and Taste of Fear. In addition, they also released a live 7" titled Smash Divisions, taken from a concert in New Haven, Connecticut the year prior. In November 1992, they entered One World Studios in Massachusetts, with producer Bill T. Miller and recorded 30 songs for their debut studio album, Unrest. They also re-recorded 10 older tracks, which were then released as a 7" single titled Deprived.

=== Breakup and post-breakup releases (1993-2016) ===
Disrupt toured Europe in October/November 1993. After returning home from tour, the band decided to break up due to personal and musical differences. Unrest would eventually be released on Relapse Records in August 1994, making it their only full-length release.

In 2007, Relapse released a seventy-eight-song 2-CD discography compilation album containing all of the band's 7" records, split albums, the Millions Die For Moneymaking demo, as well as rare rehearsals and live recordings. In 2008, seven unreleased songs that were left over from the Sauna & Warcollapse split recording sessions were released on a 12" discography by Canadian label Unrest Records. In 2016, a box set including the Unrest CD, the discography 2-CD set, and a DVD was released by Unrest, which was limited to 1000 copies.

Members of the band have gone on to play in many other acts since the dissolution of Disrupt, most notably the influential sludge metal band Grief, as well as Consume, Deathraid, State of Fear, Chickenchest And The Bird Boys, and also pure noise bands such as Goff, Demonic Death Preachers, and Effects of Alcohol.

== Band members ==
=== Final line-up ===
- Jay Stiles – vocals, bass, guitar (1987–1993)
- Pete Kamarinos – vocals (1987–1993)
- Terry Savastano – guitar (1990–1993)
- Bob Palombo – bass (1990–1993)
- Jeff Hayward – guitar (1991–1993)
- Randy Odierno – drums (1991–1993)

=== Former members ===
- Tony Leone – bass (1987; died 2016)
- Brad Jones – drums (1988)
- Mike Williams – guitar, drums (1988–1989)
- Scott Lucid – bass (1989–1990)
- Kendal Treffery – guitar (1990)
- Chris Drake – guitar (1987-1989,1990-1991)
- Harry Haralabatos – drums (1987–1988, 1989–1991)
- Alyssa Murry – vocals (1992)

== Discography ==
=== Studio albums ===
- Unrest (1994, Relapse)

=== Extended plays ===
- Disrupt (1990, Crust)
- Refuse Planet (1991, Relapse)
- Smash Divisions (1992, SOA)
- Deprived (1994, Relapse)
- Disrupt (2008, Unrest)

=== Split albums ===
- Disrupt / Tuomiopäivän Lapset (1991, Ecocentric)
- Disrupt / Destroy! (1991, Adversity)
- Disrupt / Disdain (1992, Desperate Attempt)
- Disrupt / Resist (1992, DAM)
- Disrupt / Taste of Fear (1992, Off The Disk)
- Disrupt / Warcollapse (1994, Crust)
- Disrupt / Sauna (1994, Sludge)

=== Demos ===
- Millions Die For Moneymaking (1988, Provocative Punk Productions)
- 5 Song Demo (1989, self-released)

=== Compilation albums ===
- The Rest (2007, Relapse)
- Discography (2016, Unrest)

=== Compilation appearances ===
- Son Of Bllleeeeaaauuurrrrgghhh! (1992, Slap-a-Ham)
- Apocalyptic Convulsions (1992, Ax/ction)
- Crust and Anguished Life (1993, MCR Company)
- Death... Is Just the Beginning III (1994, Nuclear Blast)
- Corporate Death - A Relapse Multi Death Compilation (1993, Relapse)
- Heavy Hardcore Headroom (1996, Profane Existence)
- Grind Your Mind - A History Of Grindcore (2007, Mayan)

== See also ==
- Animal rights and punk subculture
