= Deviated Instinct =

British extreme metal band

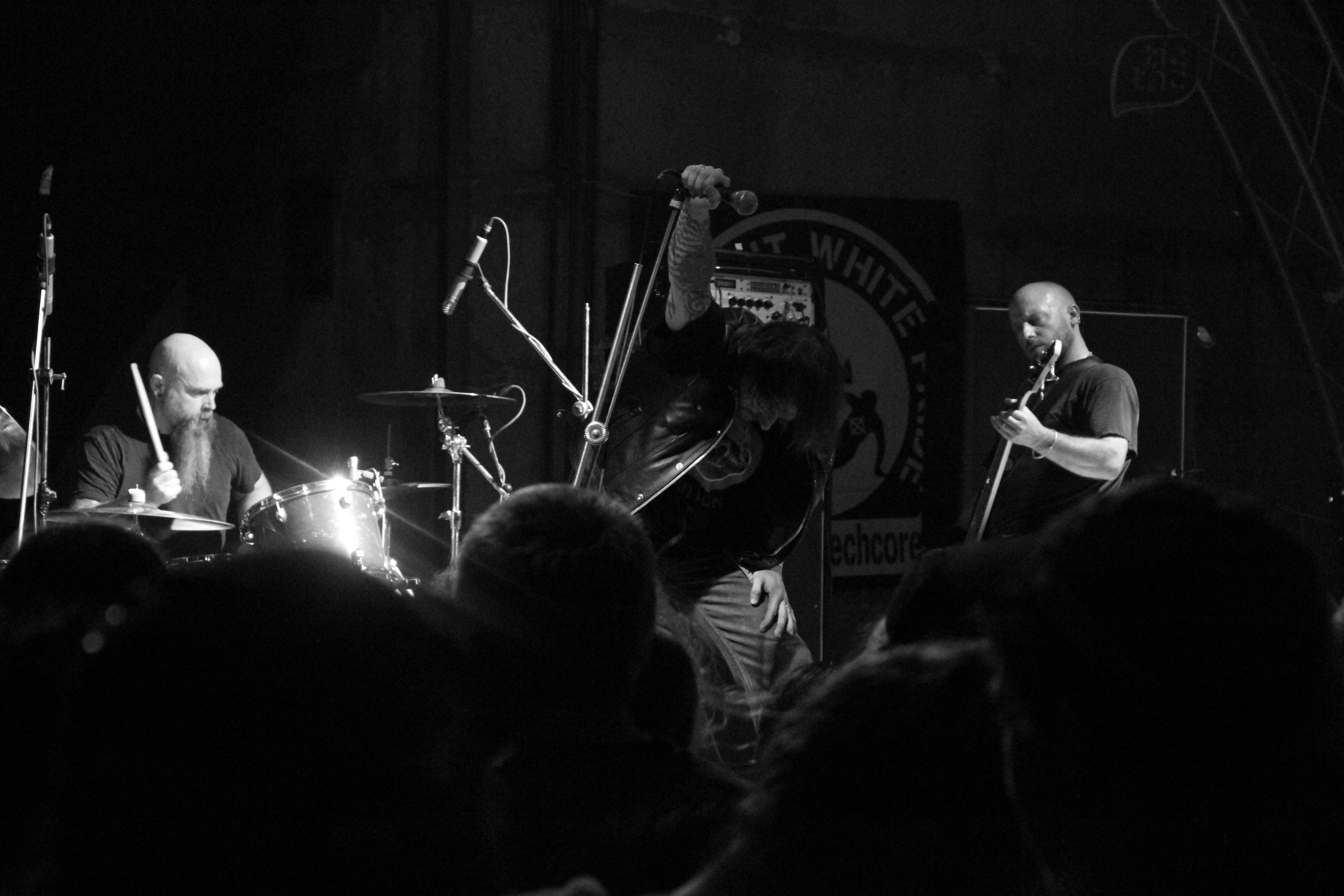
- Deviated Instinct in 2010

Background information
- Origin: Norwich, England
- Genres: Crust punk, death metal
- Years active: 1984–1991, 2007–present
- Label: Peaceville
- Members: Wesley Brown; Rob "Mid" Middleton; Snapa; Tony

Deviated Instinct are an English extreme metal band formed in Norwich in 1984. They are considered pioneers of both crust punk and death metal. Their first EP, Welcome to the Orgy, was released by Peaceville Records, which released the majority of their albums. The band disbanded in 1991, but reunited in late 2007.

== Members ==
=== Current line-up ===
- Rob "Mid" Middleton – guitar/vocals (1984–1991, 2007–present)
- Dan Theobald – drums (2026- present )
- Wesley "Wes" Brown – vocals (2024-present)
- Steve "Snapa" Harvey – bass guitar (1985–1987, 1988–1991, 2007–present)

=== Former members ===
- Antony "Tony" Shephard – drums (2009–2026)
- Julian "Leggo" Kilsby – vocals (1984–1988, 2008–2024)
- Ian – bass (1984–1985; 1987)
- Trev Cockburn – drums (1985)
- Mark – drums (1986–1987)
- Tom Mills – bass (1987–1988)
- Sean – drums (1987–1988)
- Tony "Stick" Dickens – drums (1988)
- John Adam Stevenson – drums (1989–1990)
- Charlie - drums (1990–1991)
- Simon Cooper – drums (2007–2008)

Timeline

== Discography ==
- The Last Time demo (1985)
- Welcome to the Orgy EP (Peaceville, 1987)
- Tip of the Iceberg demo (1986)
- Terminal Filth Stenchcore demo (1986)
- In Crust We Trust live LP (self-released, 1987)
- Return of Frost demo (1987)
- Consolidation split EP with Revulsion and Rhetoric (Pathway, 1988)
- Rock 'n' Roll Conformity LP (Peaceville, 1988)
- Definitive Instinct compilation (Peaceville, 1990)
- Guttural Breath LP (Peaceville, 1989)
- 1989 Demo demo (1989)
- Nailed EP (Prophecy, 1990)
- Split with Grave and Devolution (Prophecy, 1991)
- Wrenched Spine live LP (self-released, 1991)
- Re-Opening Old Wounds compilation (Desperate Attempt, 1993)
- Welcome to the Orgy compilation (Peaceville, 2006)
- Liberty Crawls...To The Sanctuary Of Slaves EP (Profane Existence, 2012)
- Nailed CD (Black Konflik, 2020)

=== Compilation appearances ===
- Words Worth Shouting LP (track: "Possession"; Radical Change, 1985)
- A Vile Peace LP (track: "Rock 'n' Roll Conformity"; Peaceville, 1987)
- 1984 the Third LP (track: "Return of Frost"; New Wave, 1987)
- Consolidation EP (tracks: "Scarecrow" and "House of Cards"' Pathway, 1987)
- Attack Is Suicide LP (track: "Master of All"; Double A, 1987)
- Adam Kemp Looks Like Shrek Double LP (Static Specs Records, 1987)
- Hiatus LP (tracks: "Scarecrow II" and "Among Friends"; Peaceville, 1988)
- Airstrip One LP (track: "Mechanical Extinction"; Mystic, 1988)
- Vile Vibes LP (track: "The Resurrection Encore"; Peaceville, 1990)
- Hardcore Holocaust II – The Peel Sessions LP (track: "Open Wound"; Strange Fruit, 1990)
- Vile Visions video (tracks: "Open Wound" and "Dipfeeder"; Jettisound, 1990)
