= From Ashes Rise =

American neo-crust band

- Origin: Nashville, Tennessee
- Genres: Neo-crust
- Years active: 1997–2005, 2010–present
- Labels: Clean Plate, Partners In Crime, Feral Ward, Havoc, Jade Tree
- Members: Dave Atchison; Brad Boatright; John Wilkerson; Derek Willman
- Past members: Billy Davis, Ryan Teetzen, Jason Piercey, Marshall Perdue, Jeff Andrews

From Ashes Rise is an American neo-crust band, formed in Nashville, Tennessee, in the mid-1990s. They helped define the gloom-heavy sound attributed to groups like His Hero is Gone and Tragedy by combining a dynamic, eerie open chord dissonance with a down-tuned power-chord-laden heaviness.

Along with Tragedy, the group relocated to Portland, Oregon, in the early 2000s.

== History ==
In early 1997, Dave Atchison and Brad Boatright formed the band, along with guitarist Jeff Andrews, bassist Jason Piercey, and vocalist Marshall Perdue. This initial lineup would be short lived, with guitarist John Wilkerson replacing Andrews. As a five-piece in this lineup, they embarked on the first of many tours, taking them through the Eastern United States. Following this tour, Perdue left the band, with Boatright and Wilkerson taking over vocal duties. In this lineup the band recorded their first 7-inch EP, "Fragments Of A Fallen Sky", released by Clean Plate Records in 1998.

During the band's first nationwide tour, Piercey left the band, resulting in the tour being completed without a bass player. In 1998, bassist Billy Davis joined the band, and they recorded the "Life and Death" EP for Davis's own Partners In Crime Records. After Davis's departure in 1999, Ryan Teetzen, of the Fort Smith, Arkansas band Burned Up Bled Dry, joined on bass, playing on their first two 12-inch LPs (Concrete And Steel 12-inch, Silence 12-inch) on the then unnamed Feral Ward Records- formerly The Great American Steak Religion. In 2001, Davis, who had relocated to Portland, OR to form Tragedy with members of the recently disbanded His Hero Is Gone re-joined From Ashes Rise. After the recording of the songs for a split 12-inch with Sweden's Victims, released on Havoc Records in 2003, the band signed with Jade Tree, and began writing the songs that would make up the Nightmares LP. Drawing on obscure hardcore bands from Scandinavia and Japan, Discharge's venerated D-beat, and crust punk From Ashes Rise helped bring an aggressive sound to Jade Tree. In 2004, Davis would depart again, and prior to tours of North America and Europe, was replaced by Derek Willman. The band then split up in Fall 2005 after doing a tour with the renowned UK band, the Subhumans.

On October 12, 2009, a reunion show at the Satyricon in Portland, OR for February 21, 2010, was announced via the band's MySpace blog. Following this concert and the release of "Live Hell" in March, the band subsequently became active once again, playing shows in Montreal, QC, Los Angeles, CA as well as Maryland Deathfest in Baltimore, MD and the Punk Illegal Festival in Munkedal, Sweden.

In numerous interviews in early 2010 members of the band hinted that there would be new material recorded, and in January 2012 the band recorded two songs- "Rejoice The End" and "Rage Of Sanity" for a two-song 7-inch EP to be released on Greg Anderson's Southern Lord Records.

On December 25, 2011, guitarist/vocalist Brad Boatright launched his own recording label, Audiosiege Media, which is a division of Moshpit Tragedy Records. Many Audiosiege releases will feature production from Brad's studio in Portland.

== Members ==
=== Current line-up ===
- Dave Atchison – drums (1997–present) (Also of No Parade, Assassinate and Smoke or Fire)
- Brad Boatright – guitar (1997–present), vocals (1998–present) (Also of Deathreat and Warcry. Formerly of The Cooters, No Parade, Midnight, World Burns To Death and Lebanon)
- John Wilkerson – guitar, vocals (1998–present) (Also of Criminal Damage. Formerly of Coldbringer and Welcome Home Walker)
- Derek Willman – bass (2004–present) (Also of The Estranged, Coldbringer, Hellshock and Lebanon. Formerly of Remains Of The Day)

=== Former members ===
- Marshall Perdue – vocals (1997–1998)
- Jeff Andrews – guitar (1997–1998)
- Jason Piercey – bass (1997–1998)
- Billy Davis – bass (1998–1999; 2001–2004) (Also of Deathreat and Tragedy)
- Ryan Teetzen – bass, vocals (1999–2001) (Also of the Fort Smith, Arkansas band Burned Up Bled Dry)

== Discography ==
- Fragments of a Fallen Sky (1998), 7-inch on Clean Plate Records
- Life and Death (1999), 7-inch on Partners In Crime Records
- Concrete & Steel (2000), LP on Feral Ward Records. Remastered in 2019 on Southern Lord
- Discography (2000), CD on Feral Ward Records
- Silence (2000), LP on Feral Ward Records. Remastered in 2019 on Southern Lord
- From Ashes Rise/Victims (2003), split LP on Havoc Records
- Nightmares (2003), CD on Jade Tree/LP on Havoc Records
- Live Hell (2010), LP on Jade Tree
- Rejoice The End / Rage Of Sanity (2012), 7-inch on Southern Lord
