= Antisect =

English punk rock band

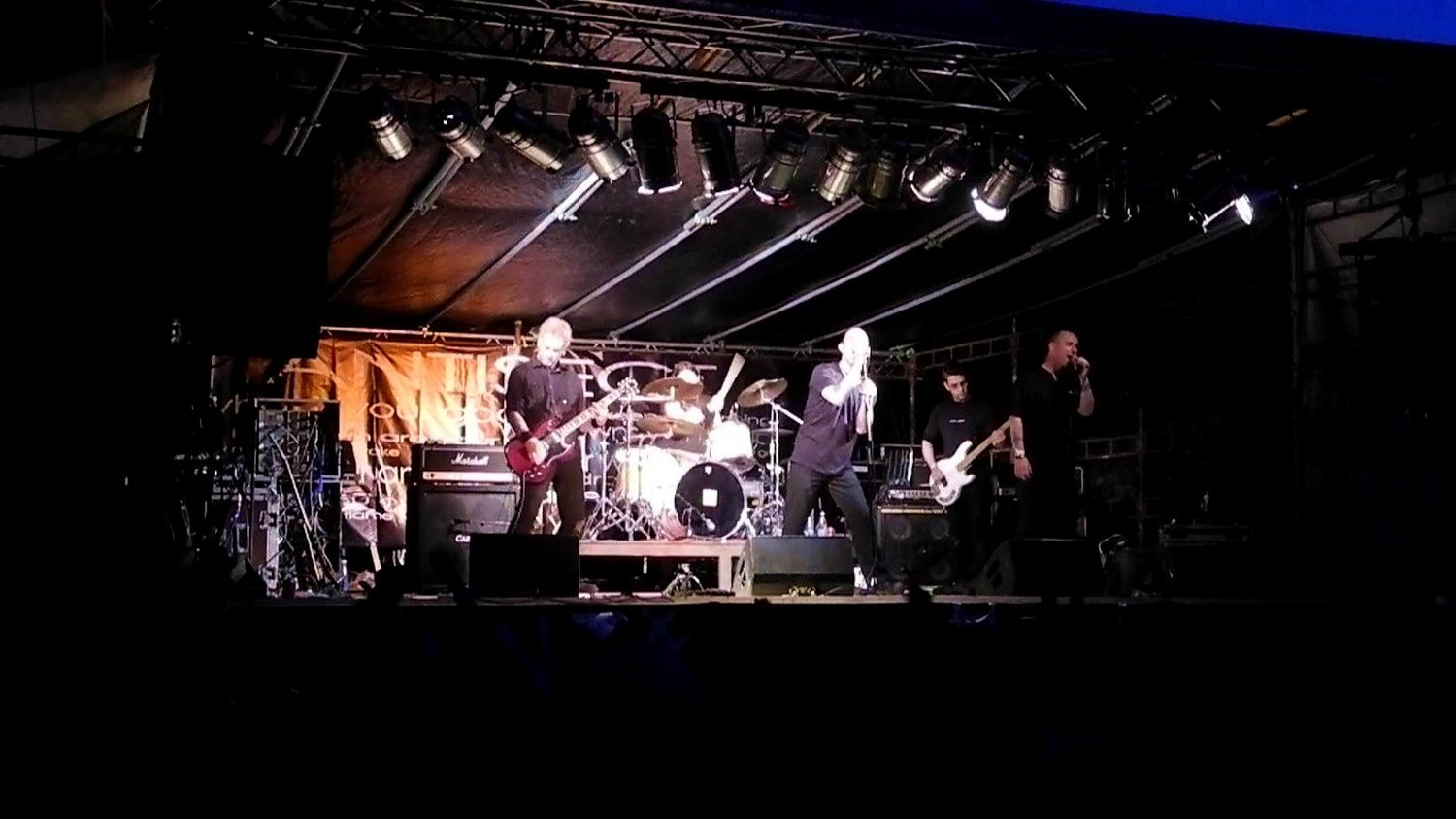

Background information
- Origin: Daventry, Northamptonshire, England
- Genres: Anarcho-punk; crust punk; hardcore punk
- Years active: 1982–1987, 2011–present
- Labels: Rise Above; Spiderleg; Southern
- Members: Pete Lyons; Joe Burwood; Jason Coppock
- Past members: Pete Paluskiewicz; Renusze Rokicki; Tom Lowe; Rich Hill; Caroline Wallis; John Bryson; Pete Boyce; Tim Andrews; Chris Caps
- Website: antisectofficial.com

Antisect are a punk rock band based in London, England. Their roots are in hardcore/anarcho punk and metal.

Formed in Daventry in 1982, their debut album, In Darkness there is No Choice, was released in 1984. 1985's follow-up EP Out from the Void has often been cited as a game changer amongst their genre for fusing a raw punk rock style with elements of metal.

Antisect are a significant band in the timeline of hardcore punk music, said to have been a major influence upon "black-clad, politically charged punks over the last 30 years".

The band address issues including animal rights and social justice, communicating their ideas to a largely punk rock audience, and were among the instigators of the squat venue scene in the mid to late 1980s. During this time, members lived the lifestyle of being either on the road or part of the vibrant London squat scene of the time. They toured extensively both in the UK and Europe and though originally splitting up in 1987, the band reformed in May 2011.

== Career ==
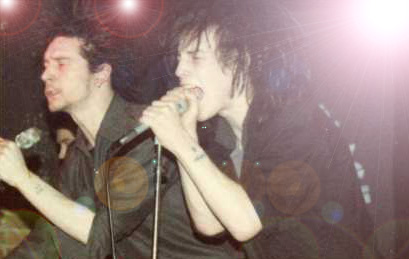
Antisect in In Darkness Tour, 1984

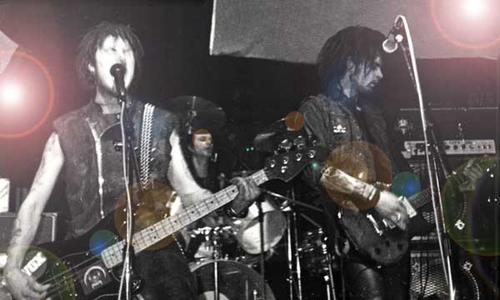
Antisect in Out from the Void Tour, 1985

Antisect were formed in Daventry, England in 1982 and began their career playing a fast, D-beat style of hardcore punk. They performed one tour with the hugely influential hardcore punk band Discharge before taking on a more anarchist leaning political edge. The band's debut album In Darkness there is No Choice was released in January 1984 on the Spiderleg Records label that was run by Flux of Pink Indians. It entered the UK Indie Chart at No. 10 on 21 January and reached No. 3 two weeks later. This was followed in 1985 by the release of the 7-inch single "Out from the Void", which reached number 2 in the Indie singles chart.

The band went through numerous line up changes, and as a three piece of Lyons, Bryson and Paluskiewicz, had recorded most of the material for a second album (provisionally entitled Welcome to the New Dark Ages), but it was never completed. Darker and heavier than their debut, some tracks that were going to be on this album have appeared in fledgling form on the live album Peace is Better than a Place in History, and the 2010 release Leeds 2.4.86.

Eventually the lifestyles of the band's members took their toll to the point where it became impossible to function as a unit and they split in 1987.

In May 2011, after a 24-year hiatus the band announced its reformation and gave details of its first show which was to be at the Puntala-Rock Festival in Finland. The line up was a mixture of previous members including founders Pete Lyons and Pete Boyce alongside Laurence Windle and Tim Andrews. Joe Burwood was brought in on drums. Caz Eden (formerly Caroline Wallis), although also back in the fold, was however, not to perform and consequently parted company with the band shortly after the first show.

Tour dates for the UK, Europe and US were announced for late 2011 and spring 2012 and in December 2011 the band returned to the studio to record a new 10-inch single, containing the previously unreleased 1982 track "4 Minutes Past Midnight" and a re-recorded version of 1985's "Out From The Void (Part 2)". This, however was a "Tour Only" release, available exclusively at the 2011/2012 shows. In March 2012 they announced that Pete Boyce had once again left the band.

The band's first US tour followed in May and June 2012 taking in venues on both the west and east coasts including a tumultuous appearance at Austins Chaos in Tejas festival (the organiser of which had played an initial part in the bands reunion). A handful of European dates were also completed before the end of the year.

The next line-up change came with the announcement of Tim Andrews departure in July 2013. Tim's farewell appearance was at the Roadburn rock festival in Tilburg, Netherlands, in April 2013. This show marked the debut of a new visual side to the band in the form of politically charged back projections.

In July of that year it was announced that Chris Caps had become the band's new vocalist. Caps's first show was at the Hygget festival in Sweden where the band's headlining set was abandoned midway through with Pete Lyons taken to hospital for what proved to be emergency heart surgery.

After Lyons' recovery the second half of 2014 saw the band appear at Ieperfest Hardcore Festival in Belgium and return to Sweden to headline Stockholms Manglet Festival. In November they played their first shows in Russia before returning to the UK to continue recording sessions for the long overdue second LP.

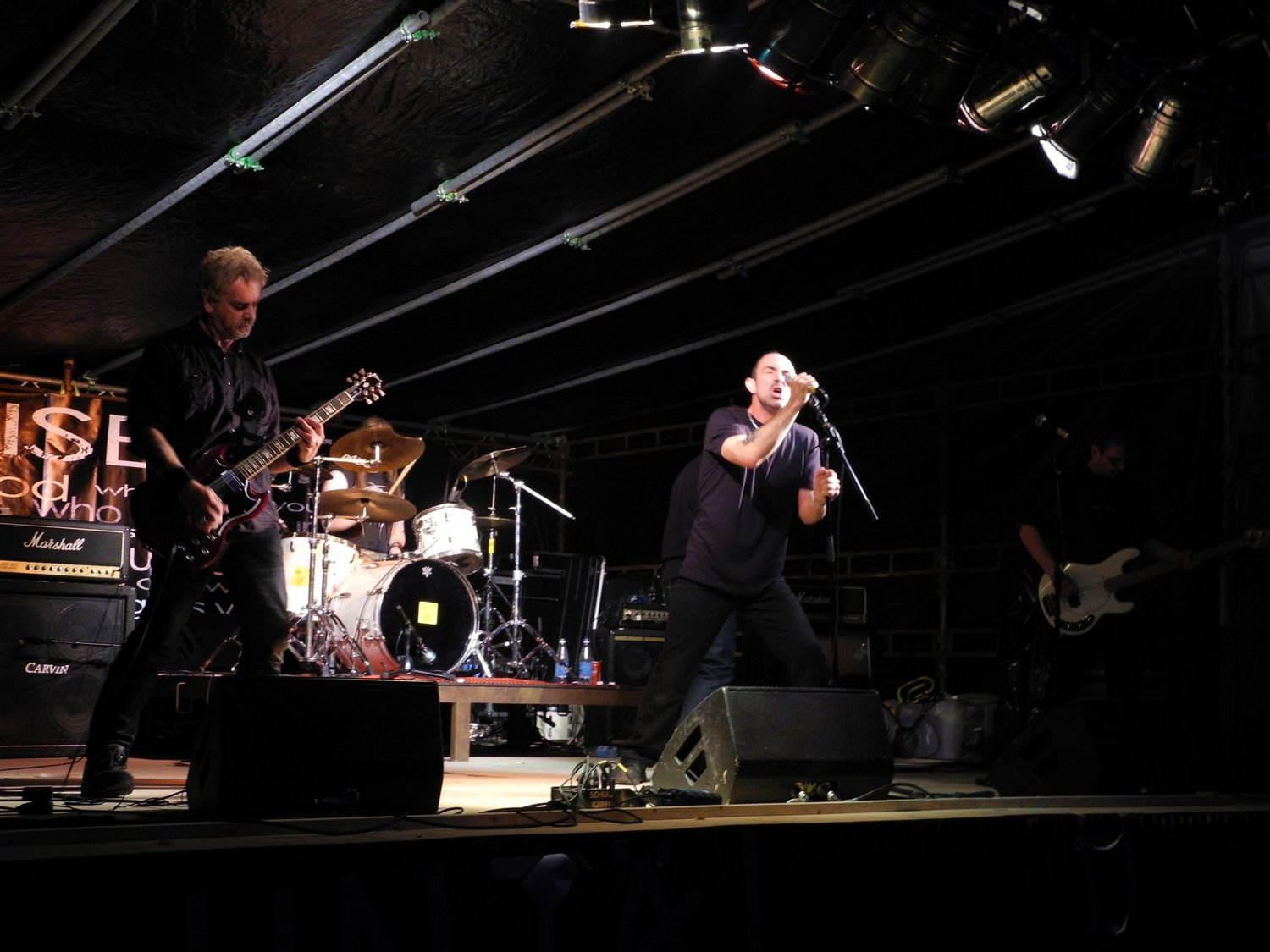
Antisect in Finland, 2011

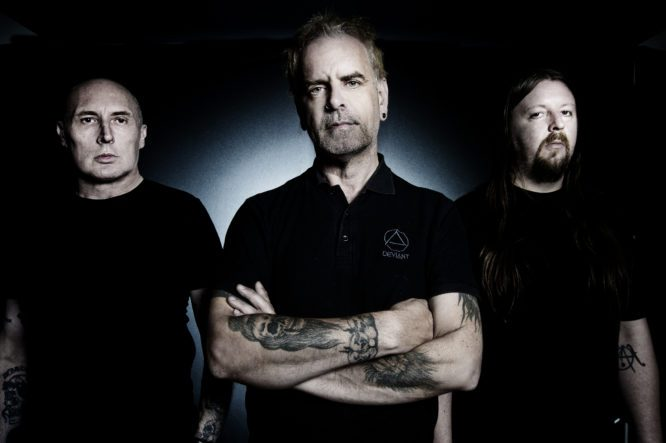
Antisect in 2017

In April 2016, the band announced the departures of Chris Caps and Laurence Windle and the re-arrival of John Bryson. The new line-up performed a semi secret show in Umea, Sweden in May 2016.

In November 2016, Pete Lyons was the keynote speaker at the 3rd annual Punk Scholars Network Symposium at the University of Northampton.

On 1 January 2017, a new track, "Black", was released exclusively on YouTube. In August 2017, Antisect signed to Rise Above Records and announced the worldwide release date of the LP The Rising of the Lights.

In September 2024, the bands 1st LP, "In Darkness There Is No Choice" was released on Rise Above Records. Containing a photo booklet and also liner notes by Pete Lyons, the record was remastered and cut direct to analogue from the original 1983 stereo masters.

== Members ==
=== Current members ===
- Pete Lyons – guitar/vocals
- Jason Coppock – bass/vocals
- Joe Burwood – drums/vocals

=== The Rising of the Lights members ===
- Pete Lyons – guitar/vocals
- John Bryson – bass/vocals
- Joe Burwood – drums/vocals

=== 2014–2015 members ===
- Chris Caps- vocals
- Pete Lyons – guitar
- Laurence Windle – bass
- Joe Burwood – drums

=== 2011–2013 members ===
- Tim Andrews – vocals
- Pete Lyons – guitar
- Laurence Windle – bass
- Joe Burwood – drums
- Pete Boyce – Vocals (2011–2012)

=== 1987 break-up members ===
- Pete Lyons – guitar
- Pete Paluskiewicz – drums
- Laurence Windle – bass
- Tim Andrews – vocals

=== 'Out from the Void' members ===
- John Bryson – bass/vocals
- Pete Lyons – guitar/vocals
- Pete Paluskiewicz – drums

=== 'In Darkness...' members ===
- Pete Lyons – guitar
- Pete Paluskiewicz – drums
- Renusze Rokicki – bass
- Pete Boyce – vocals
- Rich Hill – vocals
- Caroline Wallis – vocals

=== Founding members ===
- Pete Lyons – guitar
- Pete Paluskiewicz – drums
- Renusze Rokicki – bass
- Pete Boyce – vocals

== Discography ==
- In Darkness there is No Choice – LP, 1984
- Out from the Void – EP, 1985
- Hallo There How's Life – live album, 1991
- Peace is Better than a Place in History – live album, 1993
- Leeds 02.04.86 – live album, 2010
- 4 Minutes Past Midnight/Out from the Void (Part 2) – Tour 10"
- The Rising of the Lights - LP, 2017 Rise Above Records
- Live in Sweden - CD, 2018 Incendiary Music
