= Hellbastard =

English crust punk/thrash metal band

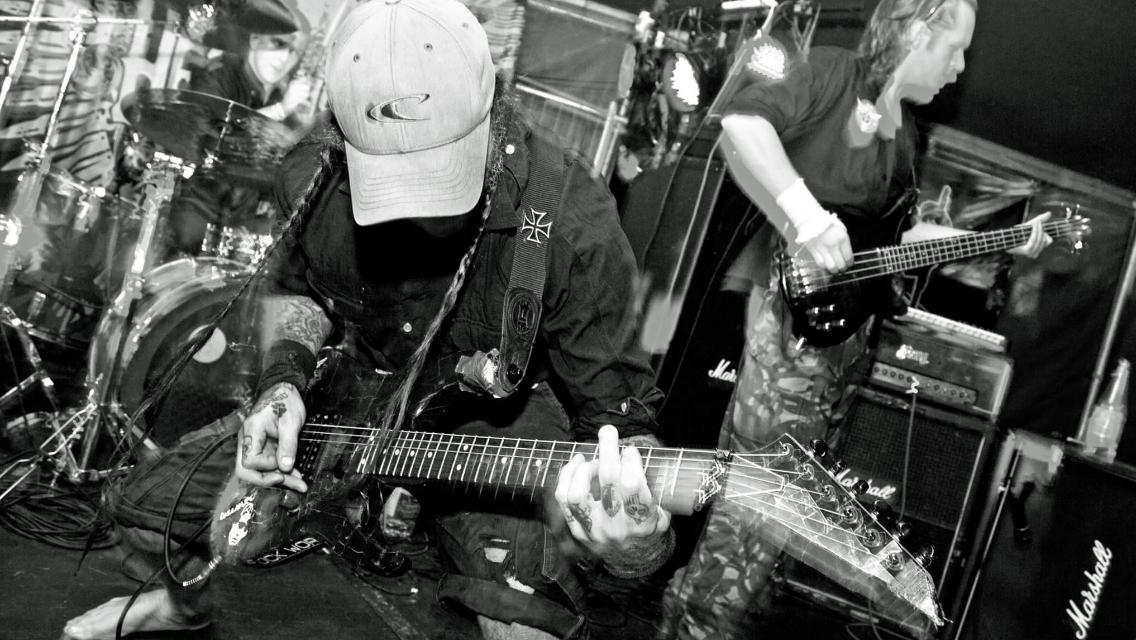
- Hellbastard in 2014

Background information
- Origin: Newcastle upon Tyne, England
- Genres: Crust punk; crossover thrash; thrash metal
- Years active: 1984–1992; 2007–present
- Labels: Meantime; Earache; Peaceville; Combat; Acid Stings; Bomb Factory; Control; Black Konflik; Selfmadegod; Patac; Civilisation
- Members: Malcolm 'Scruff' Lewty; Danny Guy; Josh Davies; Nick Read

Hellbastard is an English crust punk/thrash metal band formed in 1984 in Newcastle.

== Early history ==
Members "Scruff" Lewty, Phil Laidlaw and Ian "Scotty" Scott formed Hellbastard, which was to be a combination of Crass-like politics and the music of Slayer. In 1990, after several EPs, full-lengths and line-up changes, the group appeared on the Combat-Earache compilation album, Grindcrusher, with the song "Justly Executed", from the Earache Records Natural Order LP.

They are considered to be a hugely influential band in the crust punk genre. The genre allegedly adopted its name from the band's first demo, Ripper Crust. They are also considered to be a part of the crossover thrash scene. After leaving Hellbastard, Scotty later went on to form Hellkrusher. At one time vocalist/guitarist "Scruff lewty" and ex-guitarist "Nick" (Nick Parsons) played for their friends' band "Energetic Krusher". Hellbastard also passed on a deal with Vinyl Solution Records in 1989 in favour of an opportunity with Energetic Krusher; their Path To Oblivion album appeared soon after. Hellbastard opted to sign with Earache.

Original vocalist/guitarist "Scruff" set about reforming the band in 2007 and Hellbastard concluded numerous American and European tours. Prior to this, "Scruff" had formed other acts, including Nero Circus, Sidewinder, King Fuel, Heavy Water, The Dischargers, and Moodhoover, all of which (with the exception of King Fuel) released albums and toured extensively. In 2018, Hellbastard were writing a new album, intended to be "vicious and different".

== Discography ==
- 1985: Massacre Self - released rehearsal cassette
- 1986: Ripper Crust demo cassette
- 1987: Hate Militia demo cassette
- 1988: Heading for Internal Darkness LP
- 1988: A Vile Peace (compilation LP on Peaceville Records) (Civilised?)
- 1989: They Brought Death 7-inch EP
- 1990: Natural Order CD/LP/CASS
- 1990: Heading for Internal Darkness CD/CASS reissue
- 1993: Ripper Crust LP reissue
- 1998: Heading for More Darkness CD reissue
- 1998: "They Brought Death" on Skuld releases compilation LP
- 1998: In Grind We Crust CD compilation
- 1998: Blood, Fire, Hate... CD.
- 2002: The Good Go First album (vinyl only)
- 2009: Ripper Crust LP reissue
- 2009: The Need to Kill CD/LP
- 2009: "Pylons II" video-audio
- 2009: "Fir Bolg - Bow to Slough Feg" - video-audio
- 2009: Eco-war EP/CD
- 2009: "Sea Shepherd" video-audio
- 2010: Heading for Internal Darkness LP reissue / CD version later 2010/early 2011
- 2010: Hellbastard/Dissent split 7-inch EP
- 2012: "Arcadia" video-audio
- 2013: "Sons of Bitches" CD/LP/12"
- 2013: "Hellbastard/Dresden" split 12-inch EP
- 2013: "Engineering Human Consciousness..." video-audio
- 2014: "Engineering Human Consciousness" 7-inch (coloured vinyl) limited edition
- 2015: "We are coven" video-audio
- 2015: "Feral" CD
- 2016: Hellbastard/Herida Profunda "To the Dead & Dying" picture disc LP
- 2016: Hellbastard /Herida Profunda "To the Dead & Dying" CD digipak
- 2017: "Feral" LP (only available on CD)
- 2017: "The Need to Kill..." cassette
- 2017: "Heading for Internal Darkness w/ unheard bonus tracks (still unreleased)
- 2019: "Hate Militia" w/ unreleased tracks rough mix of Natural Order album 1989 CD
