= Fall of Efrafa =

British crust punk band

- Origin: Brighton, England, UK
- Genres: Crust punk; post-metal; hardcore punk; post-hardcore
- Years active: 2005–2009
- Labels: Fight for Your Mind; Alerta Antifascista; Behind the Scenes; Halo of Flies; Denovali; Tadpole
- Website: fallofefrafa.bandcamp.com

Fall of Efrafa was a British crust punk band formed in Brighton, England in 2005. They disbanded in 2009 after completing a trilogy of concept albums – Owsla (2006), Elil (2007), and Inlé (2009) – inspired by the mythology of the 1972 novel Watership Down.

== Biography ==
Originally from Brighton and Hove, East Sussex, the quintet was formed with the intention of recording a trilogy of albums, entitled The Warren of Snares, based on an interpretation of the mythology present within the 1972 novel Watership Down by Richard Adams. The trilogy is composed of the albums Owsla, Elil, and Inlé, co-produced by several labels. In the novel, Efrafa is a rabbit colony ruled by a dictator, who oppresses rebels through his elite police, the Owsla. In the context of the band's concept, Owsla represents the populace around which the story revolves, the Efrafa representing humanity. In the clutches of a theocratic dictatorship, their society is on the brink of collapse. With the encroachment of the Efrafa, an invasive species, this dictatorship turns to blind faith, obedience, and punishment for answers. The story records the uprising by those who defy the word of rule and religion, culminating in not only the dethronement of their leader, but a futile charge against the Efrafa.

The band presents their political and social ideology, which includes references to animal rights (they were all vegans) and deeply-held atheism; they also attack humanity's destructive habits, while analyzing their relationship with religion and fight against tyranny. Among their influences, the band cites Remains of the day, Tragedy, Godspeed You! Black Emperor, His Hero Is Gone, and Neurosis. The trilogy is cyclical and runs in reverse; with Owsla representing the climax and eventual rebirth of the story. This is signified by a passage of cello which bookends the trilogy – representing the eventual rise and fall of empires and our inability to learn from past mistakes.

The band's first album, Owsla, came out in 2006, alternating the D-beat of emo-crust with the melancholic melody of post-rock, along with some post metal influences. The album title is a word in lapine language that in the novel corresponds to the elite warriors of the warren, who very often take advantage of their position by abusing their power over other rabbits. In the context of the record, the Owsla is a name bestowed upon all by their despotic leader, in a cynical move to give his people a false sense of empowerment. This record documents the final charge against the Efrafa.

The second album, Elil (in lapine language, "the thousand", referring collectively to all the multiple enemies of rabbits), released the following year, is divided into 3 songs, all of them over 20 minutes. The music moves through post-rock/post-metal passages and a slower more brooding melodic crust, expressing a bleak melancholic atmosphere, progressively taking inspiration from doom-metal. The concept continues with a view of the psychology of those within a society fighting religious oppression, both internal and external.

The last release, Inlé, came out in 2009. The doom-metal frame that was only an influence in the previous works of the band, becomes the predominant genre, creating sonic images of emotion and desolation. The black cover and the album title, featuring Inlé, the black rabbit of death (or generally the afterlife), anticipating the atmosphere of this work divided into 7 melancholic and gloomy tracks. Stylistically, the doom-metal and post-rock are the main reference-points and replace the speed of D-beat hardcore with introspective melody. The story begins with this record, a society on the brink of self-destruction, a maniacal ruler wielding theocratic ideology, oppressing and abusing, offering nothing in the face of a much greater threat, the encroachment of humanity upon their land.

After releasing this album the band parted ways, as their only goal was to release this trilogy. Their discography was later published in a boxset called The Warren of Snares Trilogy. Their last concert was in Brighton, on 5 December 2009. Singer Alex CF later formed a number of concept bands, including Anopheli, Archivist, Wreathe and Morrow. Guitarists Steve McCusker and Neil Kingsbury went on to start Brighton-based drone-rock band Blackstorm (2007–2014) with Kingsbury going on to play in Orange Goblin as an additional live-guitarist in 2013 and for the Big Black 20th Anniversary shows for Desertfest in 2015 then bass and guitar for Earthtone9 in 2016 to 2024.

In addition to the trilogy they have also produced 3 EPs: A split with Down to Agony (2007), Tharn (a collaboration with Paper Aeroplane) (2008), and The Burial (2009), and a DVD with footage of their only U.S. tour, their final show at Westhill Hall in Brighton, UK on 5 December 2009, and photographs and artwork (non-audio).

In 2021, the band self-released a posthumous cassette entitled Owslafa which contained a demo version of their debut album Owsla, and a recording of their final ever performance. In 2023, their lead singer, artist and lyricist Alex CF, released a hardback book, entitled Ni Frith: The art and lyrics of Fall of Efrafa, which, alongside over 150 pages of illustrations and artefacts from the bands existence, contained the completed lyrics and artwork for a fourth proposed album - Zorn - which was abandoned during the recording of Inlé.

== Discography ==
=== Studio albums ===
- 2006 – Owsla (Alerta Antifascista, Behind the Scenes, Deskontento Records, Fight For Your Mind, Symphony of Destruction)
- 2007 – Elil (Alerta Antifascista, Behind the Scenes, Be-Part.Records, Deskontento Records, Fight For Your Mind, Halo of Flies Records, Sound Devastation Records, Symphony of Destruction)
- 2009 – Inlé (Alerta Antifascista, Behind the Scenes, Denovali Records, Halo of Flies Records, Sound Devastation Records)

=== Splits and EPs ===
- 2007 – Down to Agony / Fall of Efrafa split (Alerta Antifascista, Behind the Scenes, Be-Part.Records, Contraszt! Records, Laboratorio 12, Sadness of Noise Records)
- 2008 – Tharn (Sound Devastation Records, Tadpole Records)
- 2009 – The Burial (Tadpole Records)
- 2021 – Owslafa (self released)

=== Compilations ===
- 2010 – The Warren of Snares

== Videography ==
- 2010 – "The Road"

== Members ==
- Michael Douglas – bass
- George Miles – drums
- Neil Kingsbury – guitar
- Alex CF – vocals
- Steven McCusker – guitar
- Jonny Scafidi – cello
