= Tragedy (band) =

American crust punk band

- Origin: Memphis, Tennessee, U.S.
- Genres: Crust punk; neo-crust; d-beat
- Years active: 1999–present
- Labels: Tragedy; Skuld
- Spinoff of: His Hero Is Gone
- Members: Todd Burdette; Paul Burdette; Yannick Lorrain; Billy Davis

Tragedy is an American crust punk band formed in 1999 in Memphis, Tennessee, and later based in Portland, Oregon. Its members have also played in His Hero Is Gone, From Ashes Rise, and Severed Head of State. The band has released its records primarily through its own label, Tragedy Records, including the album Darker Days Ahead (2012) and the EP Fury (2018).

== Band members ==
- Todd Burdette – guitar, vocals (1999–present) (also of Deathreat, Severed Head of State, Trauma, Warcry, Copout, Rueben James, His Hero Is Gone, Funeral, Call the Police, and Nightfell)
- Yannick Lorrain – guitar (1999–present) (formerly of His Hero Is Gone, Union of Uranus, and Double Think)
- Billy Davis – bass, vocals (1999–present) (also of Deathreat and Trauma; formerly of Face Down, From Ashes Rise, and Copout)
- Paul Burdette – drums (1999–present) (also of Deathreat and Criminal Damage; formerly of His Hero Is Gone, Face Down, Rueben James, Call the Police, and Well Away)

== Discography ==
Date of release	Title	Label
2000	Tragedy	Tragedy Records
2001	Tragedy	Skuld Releases
2002	Can We Call This Life?	Tragedy Records
2002	Vengeance	Tragedy Records
2003	Vengeance	Skuld Releases
2003	Split 7" with Totalitär	Armageddon Label
2004	UK 2004 Tour EP	Tragedy Records
2006	Nerve Damage	Tragedy Records
2012	Darker Days Ahead	Tragedy Records
2018	Fury	Tragedy Records
