= Crust punk =

Music genre

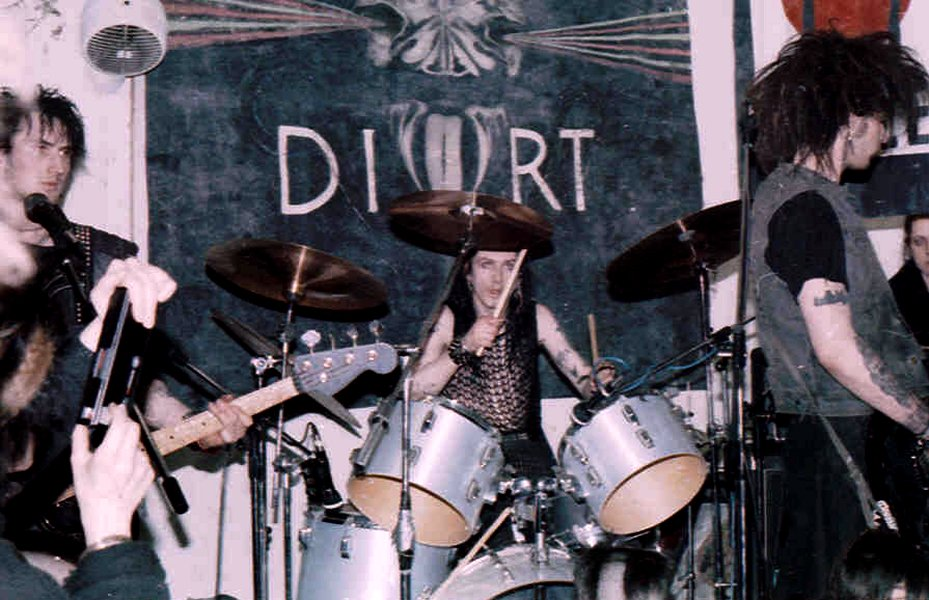
- Crust punk band Antisect performing in 1985
- Other names: Crust; stenchcore
- Stylistic origins: Anarcho-punk; extreme metal; D-beat; biker metal
- Cultural origins: Early 1980s, England
- Derivative forms: Grindcore, red and anarchist black metal

Subgenres
- neo-crust

Fusion genres
- Blackened crust, crack rock steady, crustcore

Regional scenes
- Brazil; United Kingdom

Other topics
- Crossover thrash; metalcore; sludge metal; thrashcore; thrash metal; first-wave black metal

Crust punk (also known as stenchcore or simply crust) is a fusion genre of anarcho-punk and extreme metal that originated in the early to mid-1980s in England. Originally, the genre was primarily mid-tempo, making use of metal riffs in a stripped-down anarcho-punk context, however many later bands pushed the genre to be more grandiose, faster or more melodic. Often songs are political, discussing environmentalism, socialism, anarchism, anti-capitalism, feminism and animal rights.

The genre originated in the early to mid-1980s with Amebix and Antisect, bands active in the anarcho-punk scene who began to incorporate the influence of heavy metal bands such as Hellhammer, Motörhead and Trouble. The influence of these bands led to the genre's first wave with Hellbastard, Deviated Instinct and Concrete Sox. By the late 1980s, the genre had begun to merge with hardcore punk, typified by Electro Hippies, Extreme Noise Terror and Doom. During the 1990s, this sound was continued by Swedish and Japanese bands including Skitsystem, Driller Killer, Disclose and Gloom, while other areas brought in outside influences such as Dystopia with sludge metal, His Hero is Gone with powerviolence, Choking Victim with ska and Disrupt with grindcore. During the 2000s, the most prominent sound in the genre was the neo-crust style of Tragedy, Fall of Efrafa and From Ashes Rise, which pushed the genre into more metal-influenced but also melodic and post-rock-inspired territory. At the same time, Swedish bands like Disfear and Wolfbrigade were also pushing crust punk into an increasingly melodic direction, through the incorporation of elements of melodic death metal.

== Characteristics ==
Metal lyrics were so dumb, so far removed from daily life. Venom were going on about Satan... and bikes... and Satan... and women... and Satan... I'd switch on the TV and know I was going to see hundreds of people dying because there'd been an earthquake in the third world... and all these people starving to death while military expenditure still increased... That was — and still is — the reality of it. The whole heavy metal thing is... well, bullshit basically."

— Malcolm "Scruff" Lewty of Hellbastard on lyrics in heavy metal

=== Lyrics ===
Crust punk lyrics generally discuss real-world issues as a means of activism. In particular, they discuss political and social themes such as class struggle, environmentalism, anarchism, and anti-capitalism. Sometimes these themes are hyperbolised to the point of discussing the apocalypse, religious control and nuclear destruction. Many bands also discussed feminism, animal rights and veganism or vegetarianism. In contrast, Amebix's lyrics sometimes discussed mysticism and Gnosticism.

=== Instrumentation ===
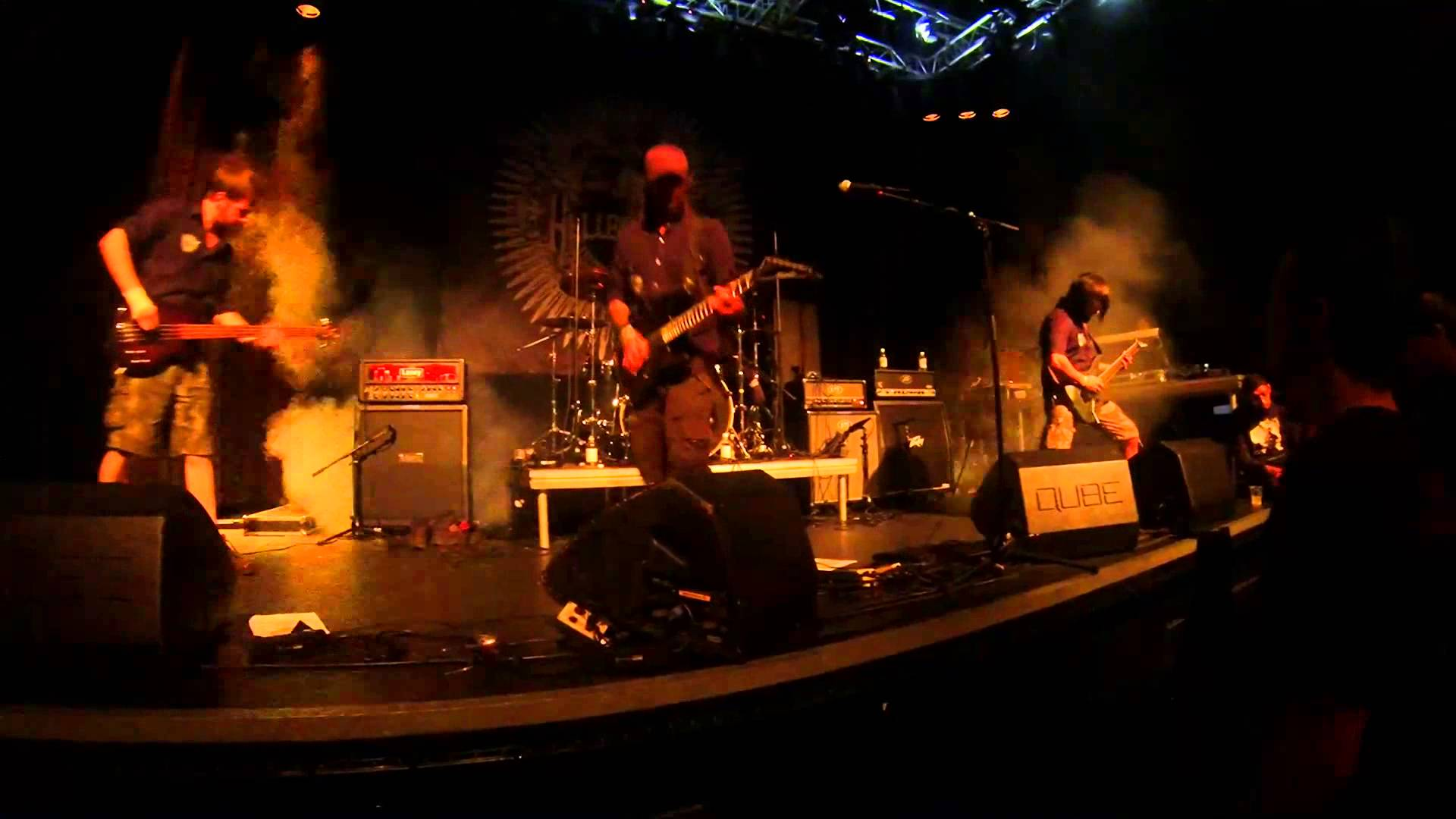
Hellbastard coined the name "crust punk" with their 1986 demo Ripper Crust

Crust punk is a derivative form of anarcho-punk, mixed with metal riffs. The overall musical sound was described by SFGate writer Loolwa Khazzoom as being "stripped down". Drumming is typically done at high speed, with D-beats sometimes being used. In Sober Living for the Revolution: Hardcore Punk, Straight Edge, and Radical Politics, author Gabriel Kuhn referred to the genre as a "blend of 1977 British punk, roots culture and black metal", with the genre often taking influence from death metal, grindcore and powerviolence.

== Etymology ==
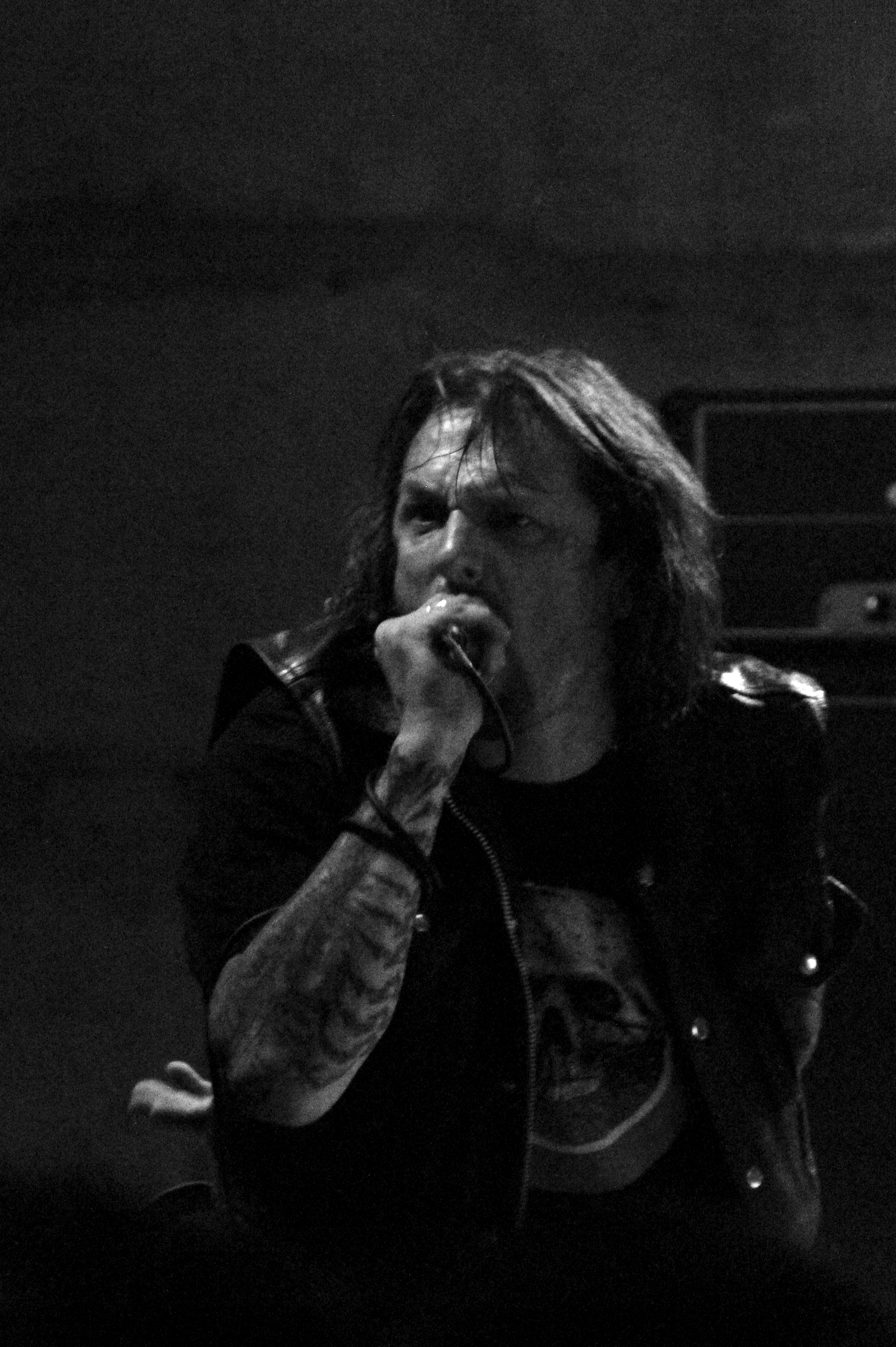
Deviated Instinct, a first wave crust punk, who coined the genre's original name "stenchcore"

The original name for the crust punk genre was "stenchcore", in reference to Deviated Instinct's 1986 demo Terminal Filth Stenchcore. In a 2007 interview with 3PRQ, the band's vocalist and guitarist Rob Middleton stated "We came up with the 'stenchcore' tag on our demo as kind of a joke as there were so many ridiculous 'cores' going about at the time and people used to comment on our general dishevelment." This term has stayed in use. However, it has developed from referring to the genre as a whole, to mean the particular mid–tempo, early extreme metal-influence sound of crust punk's first wave such as Deviated Instinct, Amebix and Antisect.

The term "crust" was coined by Hellbastard on their 1986 Ripper Crust demo. This name was derived from the "crusty" appearance of the genre's practitioning bands. Punk historian Ian Glasper states, in his book Trapped in a Scene, "Rippercrust [sic] is widely regarded as the first time the word 'crust' was used in the punk context, and hence the specific starting point of the whole crust punk genre, although some would attribute that accolade to the likes of Disorder, Chaos UK, and Amebix several years earlier." In the same book, he quoted the group's vocalist and guitarist Malcolm "Scruff" Lewty "A lot of people say we started the crust punk genre, but whatever. If they wanna say that, I don't mind, but I'm certainly no Malcolm McLaren, saying I invented something I didn't."

== History ==
=== Precursors ===
The most prominent influences upon crust punk were Crass and Discharge. Crass introduced the genre's anarchist ideology and its tattered, militaristic aesthetic, while Discharge introduced its apocalyptic themes and influence from heavy metal, particularly Motörhead. Other metal bands to influence the style included Hellhammer and Trouble.

=== 1980s ===
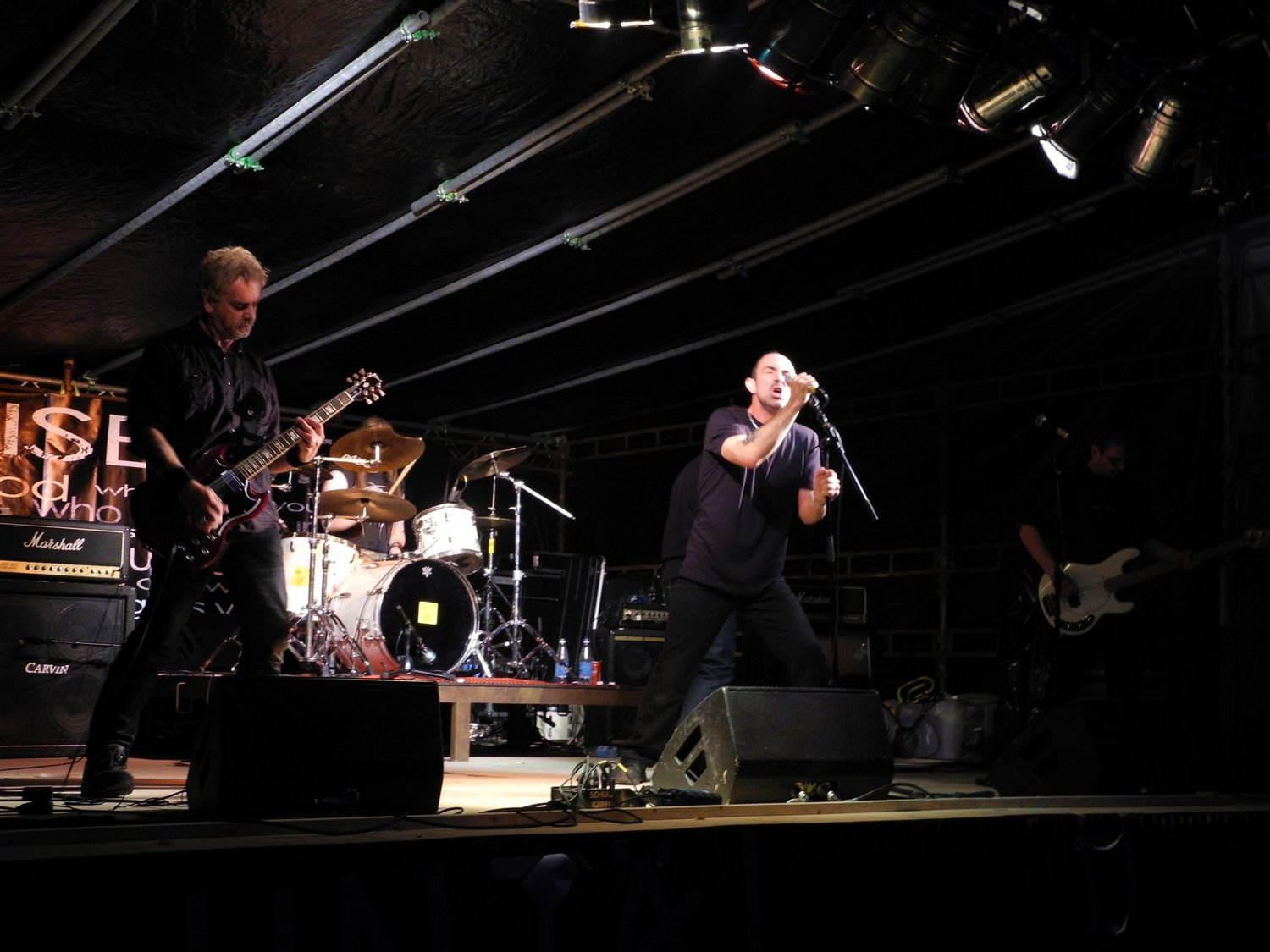
Antisect's 1985 EP Out from the Void was one of the earliest crust punk releases

Crust punk was established by the bands Amebix and Antisect, who both growing out of the anarcho-punk scene and made use of dark, morbid and post-apocalyptic imagery. Amebix had begun their career playing a style more indebted to Killing Joke, while Antisect began playing simply anarcho-hardcore punk. Amebix first embraced metal influences on their 1983 album No Sanctuary, while Antisect did so on their 1985 EP Out from the Void. These releases were the earliest crust punk releases, with Amebix's subsequent album Arise (1985) codifying the sound of the genre. However, Amebix also brought a wider scope of influences than most other bands in the genre, particularly post-punk bands including Public Image Ltd., Bauhaus, Joy Division and especially Killing Joke. Soon, the first wave of crust punk bands was solidified with the formations of Hellbastard, Deviated Instinct and Concrete Sox. This early wave of the genre was closely related to the nascent extreme metal scene, with the members of Amebix and Hellhammer even being in the same tape trading circles, influencing one another.

In the following years, the genre spread to other countries. The largest of these was the Swedish crust punk and d-beat scene which early on produced Anti Cimex and Agoni, who both quickly toured the United Kingdom. From this scene soon originated the Swedish death metal scene, which would be brought to prominence by Entombed.

American crust punk began in New York City, in the mid-1980s, with the work of Nausea. The group emerged from the Lower East Side squat scene and New York hardcore, living with Roger Miret of Agnostic Front. The early work of Neurosis, from San Francisco, also borrowed from Amebix, and inaugurated crust punk on the West Coast. Disrupt (Boston), Antischism (South Carolina), Misery and Destroy (Minneapolis) were also significant U.S. crust groups.

In the late 1980s, bands including Doom, Excrement of War, Electro Hippies and Extreme Noise Terror began to merge crust punk with the sound of UK hardcore punk, creating the crustcore subgenre. Felix Havoc described Extreme Noise Terror's segment of the "Earslaughter" split album with Chaos UK as the first album in the genre.

=== 1990s ===
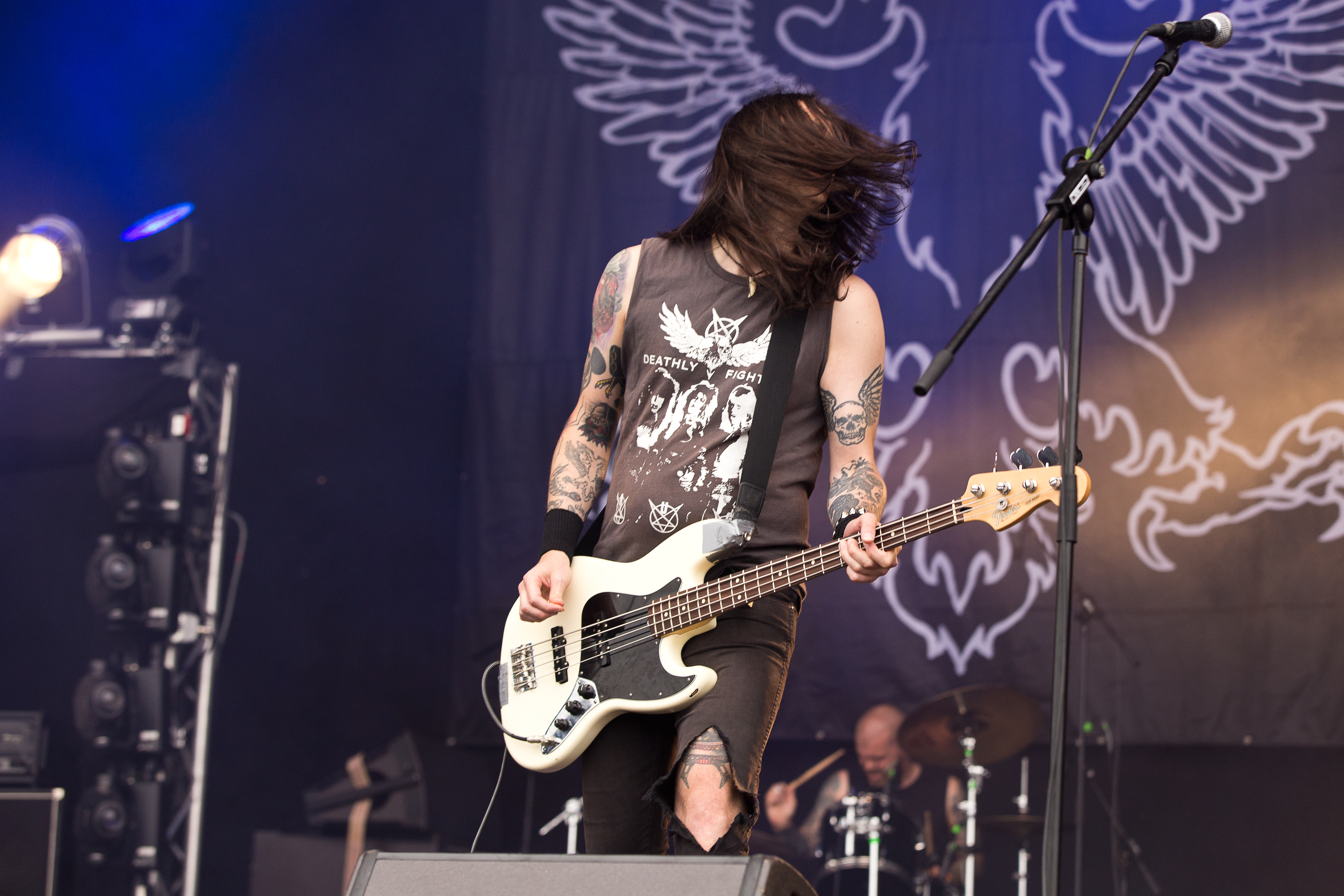
Wolfbrigade, one of the most prominent crust punk bands of the 1990s

In 1994, Orange County, California's Dystopia released their debut album Human = Garbage which merged sludge crust punk and sludge metal. An important American crust punk band was Aus Rotten from Pittsburgh, Pennsylvania. Crust punk also flourished in Minneapolis, shepherded by the Profane Existence label. In this period, the ethos of crust punk became particularly codified, with vegetarianism, feminism, and sometimes straight edge being prescribed by many of the figures in the scene. The powerviolence scene associated with Slap-a-Ham Records was in close proximity to crust punk, particularly in the case of Man Is the Bastard and Dropdead. Prominent crust punk groups (Driller Killer, Totalitär, Skitsystem, Wolfbrigade, and Disfear) also emerged from Sweden, which had always had a strong D-beat scene. Many of these groups developed in parallel with the much more commercial Scandinavian death metal scene.

During this time, crust became prominent in the American South, where Prank Records and CrimethInc. acted as focal points of the scene. The most well-known representative of Southern crust was His Hero Is Gone, whose early material incorporate elements of powerviolence and experimental music. By the band's final album The Plot Sickens (1998), they had begun to incorporate influence from the Japanese hardcore style burning spirits, to create a more grandiose and melodic take on crust punk. This sound was then continued by three of the members' subsequent band Tragedy. At the same time, in Spain bands such as Hongo, Das Plague and Ekkaia were merging crust punk with elements of screamo, creating a fusion genre which at the time was called "emo crust".

=== 2000s ===
In the early 2000s, the Spanish emo crust genre and Tragedy–His Hero Is Gone melodic crust style began to merge, leading to the beginning of the neo-crust subgenre. During the mid–2000s, this became the most prominent style in the crust scene, producing subsequent acts such as Fall of Efrafa and From Ashes Rise. Soon, bands such as Trap Them emerged, incorporating increasing elements of hardcore and death metal. By the end of the decade, many international crust punk bands had shifted their style to favour black metal influences. In 2017, Bandcamp Daily wrote that Fluff Fest, held in Czechia since 2000, has become a "summer ritual" for many European crust fans.

== Subgenres ==
=== Crack rock steady ===
Crack rock steady is a punk rock fusion-genre, which combines elements of crust punk and ska punk. Lyrics often focus on themes such as drug-use, religion, politics and social issues. Other genres sometimes incorporated in conjunction with the style include hardcore punk and heavy metal. Notable bands within the genre include Choking Victim, Leftöver Crack, Morning Glory and Star Fucking Hipsters.

=== Crustcore ===
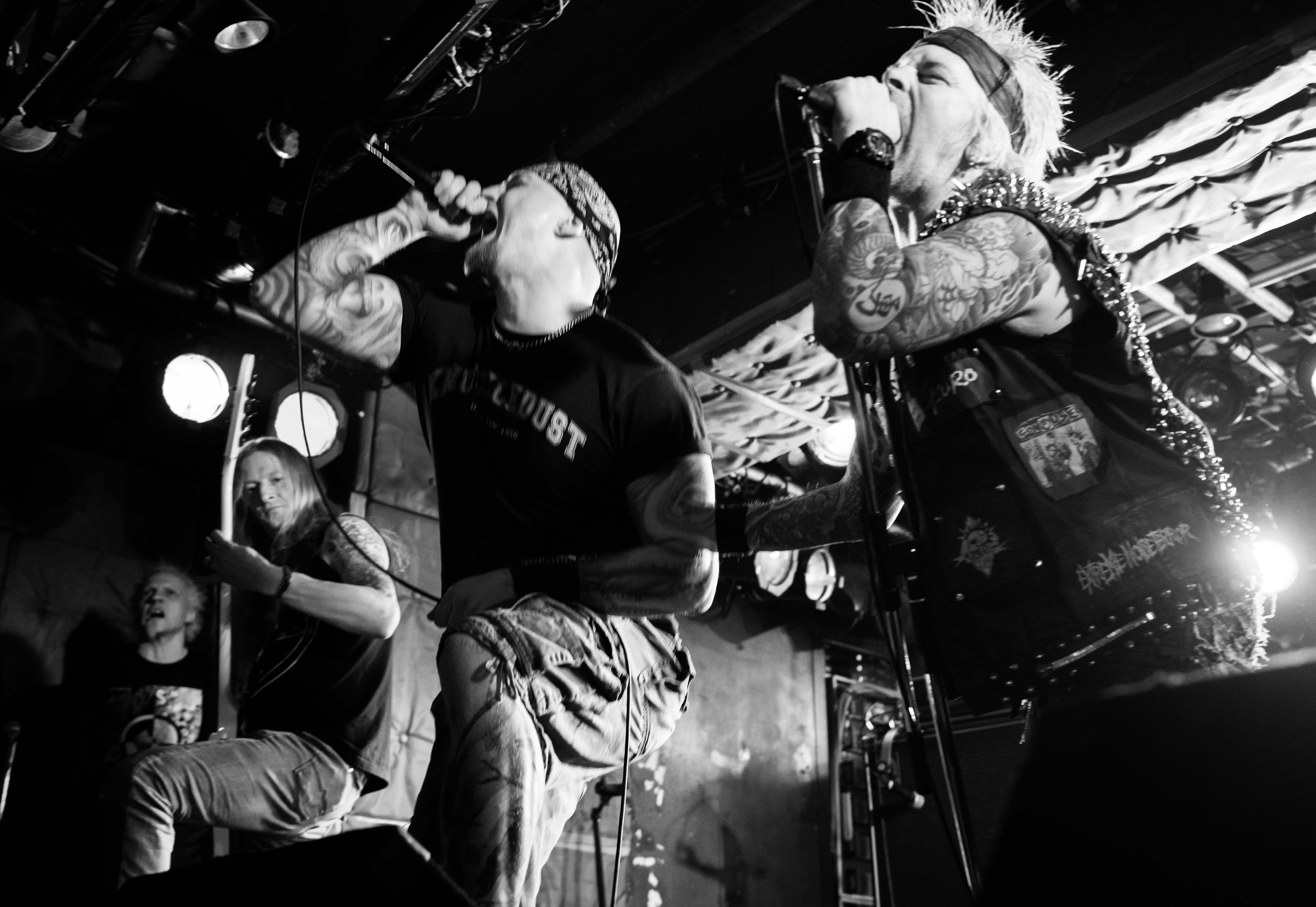
Extreme Noise Terror, an early band to merge crust punk with hardcore punk

Crustcore (also known as crusty hardcore), is a sub-genre of crust punk that takes influence from hardcore punk and sometimes thrashcore. Crustcore bands include Extreme Noise Terror, Doom, Disrupt, early Wolfbrigade, Neurosis, Baptists, Discharge and Filth.

=== Neo crust ===
Neo crust is a genre that merges crust punk with elements of various extreme music styles including black metal, screamo, post-rock, hardcore punk, death metal, sludge metal and doom metal. Unlike most other punk–metal fusion genres, neo-crust's sound is neither distinctively rooted in punk or metal; instead, it frequently shifts between the two, disregarding genre boundaries. It is often dark, heavy, and melodic. The genre makes use of a melancholic tone and a post-civilization aesthetic, often including dead trees and barren landscapes, as well as poetic band names and lyrics. Some bands, such as Cwill and Remains of the Day even incorporate violins into their music.

The style originated as a amalgamation of two separate sounds that began concurrently in the late 1990s: the screamo influenced "emo crust" style of Spanish bands Hongo, Das Plague, Ekkaia, Madame Germen and Blünt; and the melodic crust sound of later His Hero is Gone and early Tragedy, which was influenced by the Japanese hardcore style burning spirits. By 2002, Ekkaia and Tragedy had toured together, and subsequently adopted elements of each other's styles. This style was soon termed neo-crust by Alerta Antifascista records founder Timo Nehmtow, and saw widespread popularity in the punk scene during the mid–2000s. By the end of the decade, the sound had decline in popularity. Notable bands include His Hero is Gone, Tragedy, and Fall of Efrafa.

== Legacy ==
=== Black metal ===
Crust punk and black metal evolved alongside one another, with the members of early crust band Amebix and first-wave black metal band Hellhammer tape trading with one another. Thus, pioneering black metal bands such as Hellhammer, Bathory and Mayhem were inspired by crust punk, and early crust punk bands such as Sacrilege, Amebix and Antisect were influenced by Hellhammer and Celtic Frost.

==== Blackened crust ====
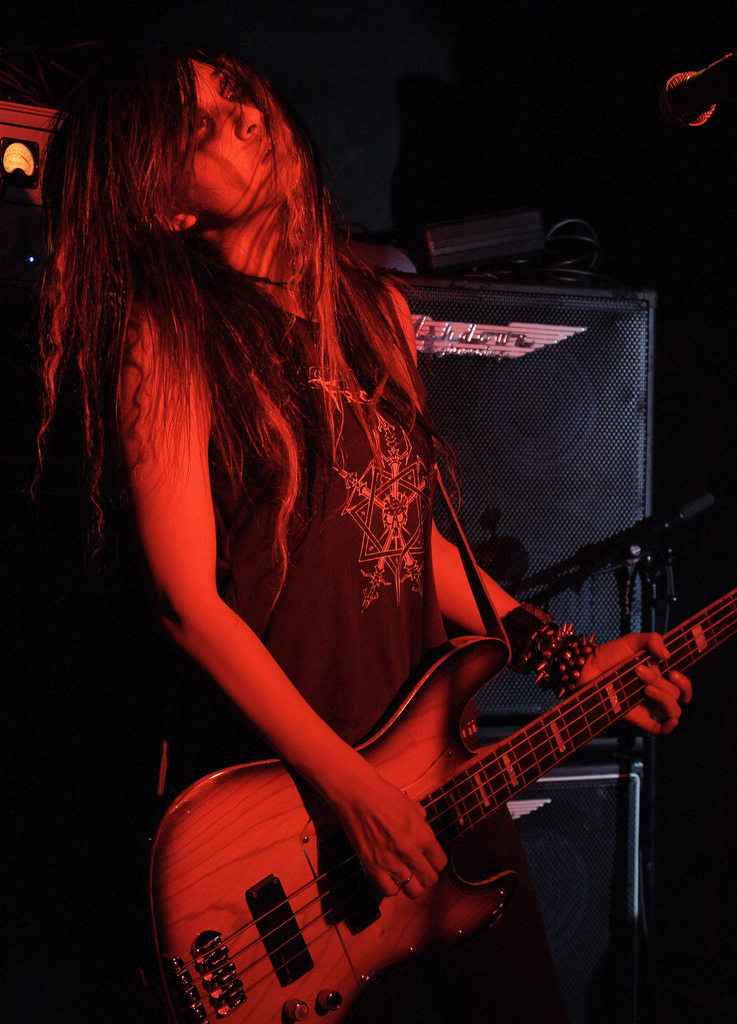
Vivian Slaughter of blackened crust band Gallhammer

Crust punk was affected by a second wave of black metal in the 1990s, with some bands emphasising these black metal elements. Iskra are probably the most obvious example of second-wave black metal-influenced crust punk; Iskra coined their own phrase "blackened crust" to describe their new style. The Japanese group Gallhammer also fused crust punk with black metal while the English band Fukpig merge elements of crust punk, black metal, and grindcore. Germany's Downfall of Gaia mix crustgrind and black metal, along with elements of sludge metal, doom metal and post-metal. North Carolina's Young and in the Way have been playing blackened crust since their formation in 2009. In addition, Norwegian band Darkthrone have incorporated crust punk traits in their mid-to-late 2000s material. As Daniel Ekeroth wrote in 2008,

In a very ironic paradox, black metal and crust punk have recently started to embrace one another. Members of Darkthrone and Satyricon have lately claimed that they love punk, while among crusties, black metal is the latest fashion. In fact, the latest album by crust punk band Skitsystem sounds very black metal--while the latest black metal opus by Darkthrone sounds very punk! This would have been unimaginable in the early 90s.

—

==== Red and anarchist black metal ====
Red and anarchist black metal (also known as RABM or anarchist black metal) is a subgenre that melds black metal with anarchist crust punk, promoting ideologies such as anarchism, environmentalism, or Marxism. Artists labelled RABM include Iskra, Panopticon, Skagos, Storm of Sedition, Not A Cost, Black Kronstadt, and Vidargangr.

=== Grindcore ===
Crust punk led to the development of the grindcore genre, by bands including Extreme Noise Terror, Napalm Death and Carcass. However, Pete Hurley, former guitarist of Extreme Noise Terror, declared that he had no interest in being remembered as a pioneer of this style: "'grindcore' was a legendarily stupid term coined by a hyperactive kid from the West Midlands, and it had nothing to do with us whatsoever. ENT were, are, and — I suspect — always will be a hardcore punk band... not a grindcore band, a stenchcore band, a trampcore band, or any other sub-sub-sub-core genre-defining term you can come up with." This early crust punk-leaning grindcore sound is sometimes dubbed "crustgrind".

== Culture ==
Crust punks are associated with a DIY-oriented branch of punk garb. Similar to anarcho-punk, most clothing is black in colour. Denim jackets and hooded sweatshirts with sewn-on patches, or vests covered in studs, spikes and band patches are characteristic elements of the crust punk style of dress or pants covered in band patches. Crust punks also sometimes wear dreadlocks and piercings. Julian "Leggo" Kilsby of Deviated Instinct describes crust as "a punk-y biker look, more akin to Mad Max. Mad Max 2 is the crustiest film ever made!"

Members of the sub-culture are generally outspokenly political, possessing anarchist and anti-consumerist views.

== See also ==
- List of crust punk bands
- Anarcho-punk
- Grindcore
- D-beat
- Gutter punk
- Animal rights and punk subculture
