= His Hero Is Gone =

American crust punk band

Background information
- Origin: Memphis, Tennessee, U.S.
- Genres: Crust punk
- Years active: 1995–1999
- Labels: Prank Records, The Great American Steak Religion
- Spinoffs: Tragedy
- Past members: Todd Burdette; Carl Auge; Paul Burdette; Yannick Lorrain; Pat Davis

His Hero Is Gone was an American crust punk band from Memphis, Tennessee. The band formed in 1995 from members of Copout, Man With Gun Lives Here, Union of Uranus and FaceDown. They toured the United States extensively, as well as Europe and Japan, and disbanded in 1999, playing their last show in Memphis.

== History ==
His Hero Is Gone released three studio albums, along with a demo tape and several EPs and split releases. Simultaneously or afterwards, band members played in the bands Deathreat, Severed Head of State, Call the Police, Dimlaia, Warcry, Union of Uranus, and more. Todd Burdette, Paul Burdette, and Yannick Lorrain went on to form the crust punk band Tragedy.

The band's lyrics addressed political subjects including globalization, urban policing, cultural alienation, and corporate greed. Writing for Decibel in 2019, Greg Pratt described Monuments to Thieves as "apocalyptic, grinding, d-beat-fueled crust and hardcore". AllMusic's Paul Kott wrote that after the release of Fifteen Counts of Arson and extensive touring, the band "had become one of the world's leading political punk bands". The band avoided conventional self-promotion; in an interview with HeartattaCk, members said they would not use computers even to produce the band's artwork or lyric sheets.

== Members ==
- Todd Burdette – guitar, vocals – also of Tragedy, Deathreat, Severed Head of State and Warcry; formerly of Copout and Call the Police
- Carl Auge – bass, vocals – also of Syndromes, and formerly of Man With Gun Lives Here, Sob Story, Dimlaia, I Love a Parade, Drain the Sky
- Paul Burdette – drums – also of Tragedy, Deathreat and Criminal Damage; formerly of Face Down and Call the Police
- Yannick Lorrain – guitar – also of Tragedy, formerly of Union of Uranus
- Pat Davis – guitar, vocals – also of Hellthrasher and formerly of Sob Story

== Discography ==
Studio albums

- Fifteen Counts of Arson LP (1996, Prank)
- Monuments to Thieves LP (1997, Prank)
- The Plot Sickens LP (1998, The Great American Steak Religion)

Extended plays

- Medicine of Thieves demo tape (1995, Partners on Crime)
- The Dead of Night in Eight Movements 7" (1996, Prank)
- Split E.P. 12" with Union of Uranus (1998, The Great American Steak Religion)
- Fools Gold 7" (1998, The Great American Steak Religion) (Released in Europe through Coalition Records)

Compilation appearances

- Complacency 7" (1997, Tuttle) – "Skinfeast"
- Cry of Soul 7" (1998, Crow) – "Disinformation Age"
- Fiesta Comes Alive LP (1998, Slap-A-Ham) – "T-Minus Zero"
