= Punk in Sweden =

Regional music scene

Punk rock and hardcore punk have created a punk subculture in Sweden since punk music became popular in the 1970s. Punk came to Sweden in the spring of 1977; the event credited as the beginning of the punk movement in Sweden was a one-day festival lined up with Sex Pistols, The Clash, Ramones, and Television.

== History ==
The most famous Swedish punk band was Ebba Grön, followed by KSMB; other notable bands were Asta Kask, Kriminella Gitarrer, Tant Strul, Pink champagne, The Pain and Göteborg Sound. In the 1980s hardcore punk, kängpunk and raw punk became popular in Sweden. The two most influential bands are Mob 47 and Anti Cimex, whose music has also inspired many foreign bands. Some other examples of influential bands are Moderat Likvidation, Black Uniforms, Totalitär, Headcleaners, Homy Hogs and Avskum.

There is also a Swedish subgenre called trallpunk, with its roots in '80s melodic punkbands and raw punk bands like Asta Kask, Total Egon, Strebers, Charta 77, Puke, Rolands Gosskör and Sötlimpa, etc. Many of these early trallpunk bands had a powerful folk music undertone and a style of music with catchy melodies, fast drum speed and narrative texts, often left-wing political lyrics, and unlike the more aggressive hardcore punk, straight to the point lyrics. Notable trallpunk bands include De lyckliga kompisarna, Strebers, Dia Psalma, Charta 77, Coca Carola, Räserbajs, köttgrottorna, Radioaktiva Räker. later trallpunk bands took inspiration from American skatepunk and play a mix between the two. For example, Skumdum.

Early punks in Sweden clashed with the youth movement Raggarna, which was working class and centered around cars, drinking, and rockabilly music. These conflicts were described in lyrics, for example by the Rude Kids and P-Nissarna.

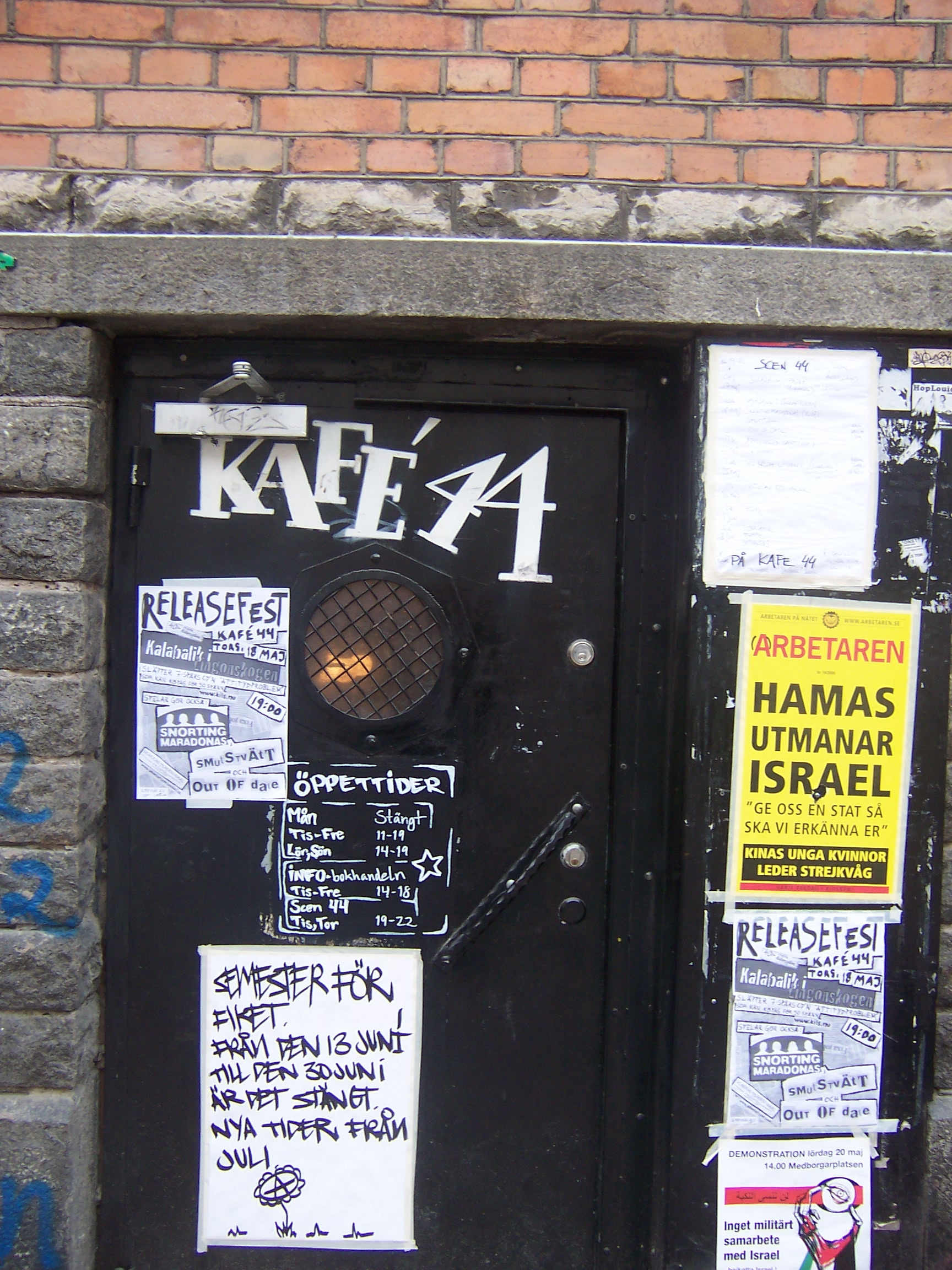
Kafé 44 in Stockholm in January 2003

In the beginning, there were several venues and cultural meeting points associated with the Swedish punk subculture. One of the first of these was the Oasen in Rågsved, followed by Ultrahuset in Haninge, and Vita huset in Täby. Venues where a lot of punk is played today include the Kafé 44 on Södermalm in Stockholm, and Verket in Umeå.

Punk in Sweden also connected with the hardcore scene that emerged in Umeå and other northern cities in the 1990s, with bands such as Refused (Umeå) and Raised Fist (Luleå) in the lead. Refused had a strong base in the genre's traditional roots and may in part represent how it sounded then, but experimented and stretched the limits sufficiently to their most famous songs rather have come under the term post-hardcore. In the 1990s, the punk scene also turned more towards crust punk with bands like Driller Killer, Skitsystem, Wolfbrigade, and Disfear.

In the 2000s many of the first and second wave Swedish punk bands such as Asta Kask, Dia Psalma, Mob 47, Moderat Likvidation and De lyckliga kompisarna reunited. They released new albums, with new songs. This decade many hardcore punk bands from Umeå and northern Sweden started to play more pop-influenced punk and the early Swedish punk like Ebba Grön and KSMB, for example Invasionen with Dennis Lyxzén from Refused and Knugen Faller with Inge Johansson from Totalt jävla mörker.

== Notable bands ==
=== 1970s and 1980s ===
- Anti Cimex
- Asocial
- Asta Kask
- Attentat
- Avskum
- Bedrövlerz
- Charta 77
- Coca Carola
- Ebba Grön
- Existenz
- De lyckliga kompisarna
- Disarm
- D.T.A.L.
- G-Anx
- Headcleaners/Huvudtvätt
- Homy Hogs
- Incest Brothers
- Kriminella Gitarrer
- KSMB
- Mob 47
- Product Assar
- Rövsvett
- Rude Kids
- Sighstens Grannar
- Sound Of Disaster
- Stockholms Negrer
- Strebers
- Tant Strul
- Tatuerade Snutkukar
- Warheads

=== 1990s ===
- Abhinanda
- Adhesive
- Driller Killer
- Disfear
- Dia Psalma
- Krymplings
- Millencolin
- No Fun At All
- Outlast
- Radioaktiva räker
- Raised Fist
- Randy
- Refused
- Satanic Surfers
- Skitsystem
- Skumdum
- Wolfbrigade

=== 2000s ===
- Besserbitch
- Disconvenience
- Fornicators
- Hårda Tider
- Honnör SS
- Insidious Process
- Invasionen
- Knugen Faller
- Makthaverskan
- Masshysteri
- Psykbryt
- Sällskapsresan
- Shuvit
- Skitkids
- Snorting Maradonas
- Suis La Lune
- Undergång
- Varnagel

== Notable labels ==
- Birdnest Records - started by Charta 77's Per Granberg
- Beat Butchers

== Literature ==
- David Andersson. Råpunk: The Birth of Swedish Hardcore 1981-89. (No Good, 2023).

== Videos ==
- We are the Best! (2013) written by Coco Moodysson, directed by Lukas Moodysson
