= Trallpunk =

Swedish punk music genre

- Stylistic origins: Punk rock; melodic hardcore; hardcore punk; folk punk; anarcho-punk
- Cultural origins: Late 1980s, Stockholm, Sweden
- Typical instruments: Vocals; guitar; bass; drums

Other topics
- Skate punk; pop punk

Trallpunk (Swedish; roughly translates to 'ditty punk' — see the Wiktionary entry) is a subgenre of punk music developed in Sweden. It is known for its two-beat, fast drum tempos, a melodic sound with harmonized vocals, and politically oriented lyrics in Swedish. Generally, trallpunk music advocates for left wing political causes. Asta Kask is considered to be one of the first trallpunk bands. During the 1990s, trallpunk saw increased popularity, particularly due to the club Kafé 44 in Stockholm and the band De Lyckliga Kompisarna (The Happy Friends).

Today, trallpunk is represented through bands such as Varnagel, Slutstation Tjernobyl, Greta Kassler, and De Lyckliga Kompisarna. Internationally, bands like Rasta Knast and Takahashi Gumi are examples.

== Trallpunk bands ==
Some trallpunk bands include:

- Argentina
- Asta Kask
- Björnarna
- Charta 77
- Coca Carola
- De Lyckliga Kompisarna
- Dia Psalma
- Die Zlaskhinx (Finland)
- Dökött
- Dr. Anti Skval
- Epa
- Factums Punkorkester
- Finkel Rokkers
- Granit & the no one elses
- Greta Kassler
- Grötkäft
- Gymnastiken
- Hans & Greta
- Hiroshima
- Kardinal Synd
- KKPA
- Körbärsfettera
- Köttgrottorna
- Krymplings
- Lastkaj 14
- M.I.D.
- Mimikry
- Ohlson har semester production
- Otajt
- Punktering
- Radioaktiva Räker
- Rasta Knast
- Räserbajs
- The Retards
- Sällskapsresan
- Sardo Numspa
- Senap
- Sighstens Grannar
- Skumdum
- Slutstation Tjernobyl
- Smutstvätt
- Snorting Maradonas
- Sofistikerat Svammel
- Sten & Stalin
- Strebers
- Tarmgas
- Total Egon
- Trallskruv
- Tralltrollen
- Troublemakers
- UBBA
- Varnagel
- Vintertid
- 4zugara (Japan)

== Notable labels ==
- Beat Butchers
- Birdnest Records
- Kamel Records
