= Krymplings =

Swedish punk band

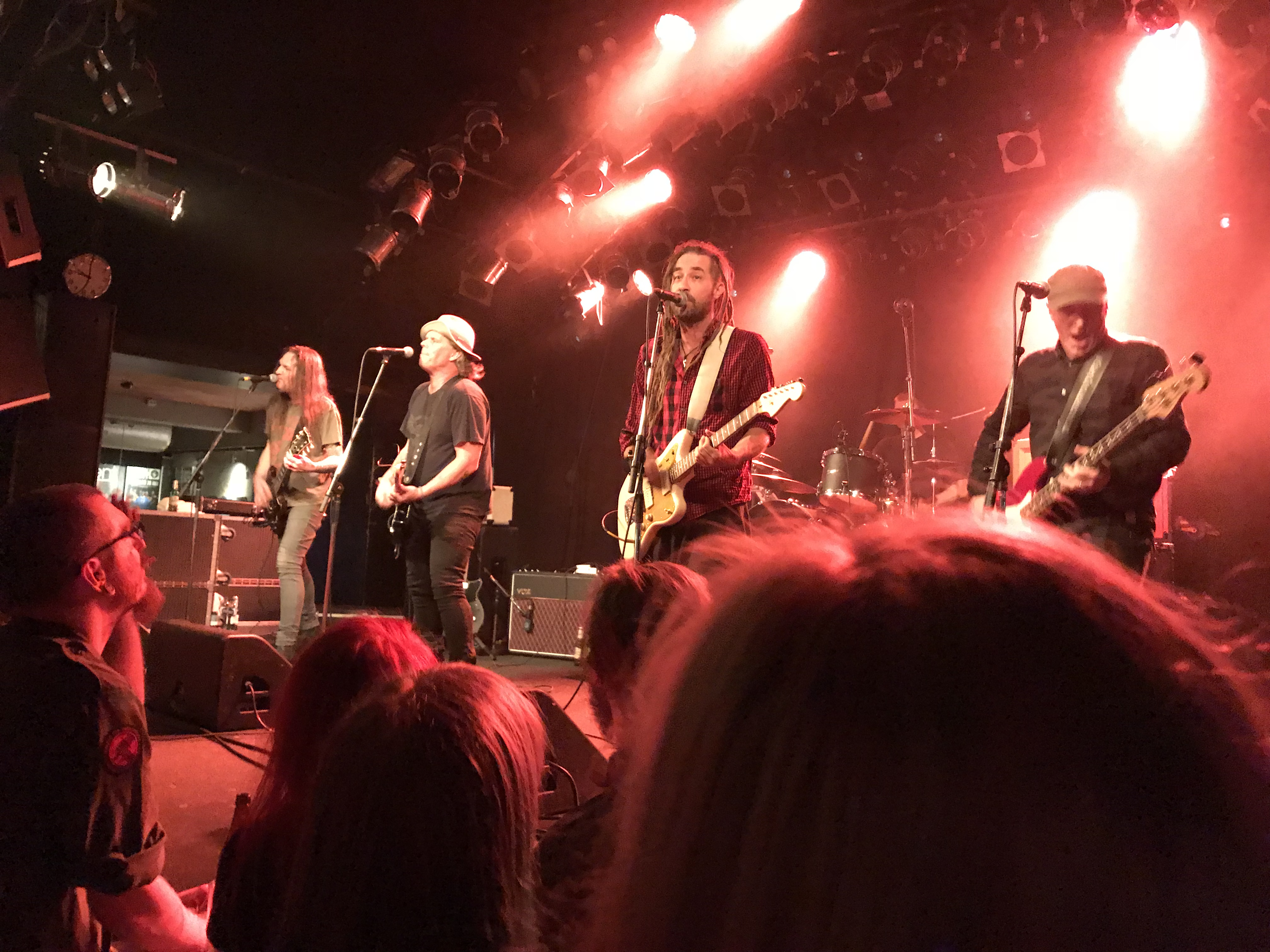
- Krymplings at Kulturbolaget in Malmö, 13 October 2017. From left to right: Ulke, Curre Sandgren, Per Granberg, Mongo. In the background: Mart Hällgren.

Background information
- Genres: punk
- Years active: 1993–1994, 2004, 2014, 2017–
- Labels: Birdnest, Beat Butchers
- Members: Ulke Johansson Mart Hällgren; Curre Sandgren; Per Granberg Stefan "Mongo" Enger

Krymplings is a Swedish supergroup punk band which was founded in August 1993. They have released two studio albums.

== History ==
In 1993, Curt "Curre" Sandgren, frontman of the punk band Coca Carola, contacted four other singers and songwriters with the idea of creating a new music group; the members had a meeting at Kafé 44 in Stockholm and the band Krymplings was formed. The line-up became Ulke from Dia Psalma and Strebers on guitar, Per Granberg from Charta 77 on guitar and bass, Curre from Coca Carola on guitar, Mongo from Köttgrottorna on bass, and Mart Hällgren from De Lyckliga Kompisarna on drums.

The band's name is a play on the name of the band Grymlings, who were a collection of established musicians first put together for a TV recording in Sweden. Krymplings released their first record Krymplings (self-titled) in 1994 on Beat Butchers Records.

Upon forming the band, they announced that all members would write songs and sing, but no one would sing their own song. On their first tour, this rule has since also been applied to songs usually associated with the members' main bands. An example, at a concert in Lund in 1994, Mongo from Köttgrottarn sang Charta 77's Ensam kvar instead of Granberg. Also Ulke from Dia Psalma sang Coca Carolas Döda dej instead of Curre. Symbolically, Mart was also slightly pushed aside when, during the encore, he begins to sing his own song Egon.

During September and October 1994, the band did a longer tour, which was named Dunken tur 1994. The band has subsequently reunited temporarily several times, including for a gig at Café 44 in 2004, and for the festival Augustibuller in 2004. Ten years later (2014) they released the song Kom och bli med oss (English translation: Come and join us) ahead of a reunion gig at Beat Butcher's 30th anniversary in September 2014.

On 5 May 2017, the group released their second studio album Första var gratis, a record they had started to work on in 2003. The Krymplings launched a tour to support the album. When Beat Butchers celebrated 35 years at Kraken in Stockholm on 21 September 2019, Krymplings was the closing act.

== Discography ==
- Krymplings (1994). Tracklists:

Song		Duration
1	Drömprinsessorna	3:26
2	Masturbation Blues	2:48
3	Burkluft	1:35
4	Mopeden	2:06
5	Herr Chaufför	2:19
6	Karlavagnen	3:36
7	The Lok of Love	1:58
8	Tommy Värsting	2:36
9	Jag Vill Ha En Slav	2:32
10	Ni Blir Aldrig Av Med Oss	4:57
11	Dunken	3:59

- Första Var Gratis (2017). Tracklists:

Song		Duration
1	Ett Par Kalla Till	2:39
2	Guld & Diamanter	2:49
3	Kom Och Bli Med Oss	2:37
4	Vill Inte Vara Ensam Mer	3:26
5	Smyg Och Skäms	2:15
6	Vi Är Några Killar	3:12
7	Lina Skog	2:05
8	Mull	2:12
9	Medeltiden	1:56
10	I Backspegeln	1:51
11	Hem Igen	2:42
12	SEX NOLL TVÅ	6:14
