= Coca Carola =

Swedish punk band

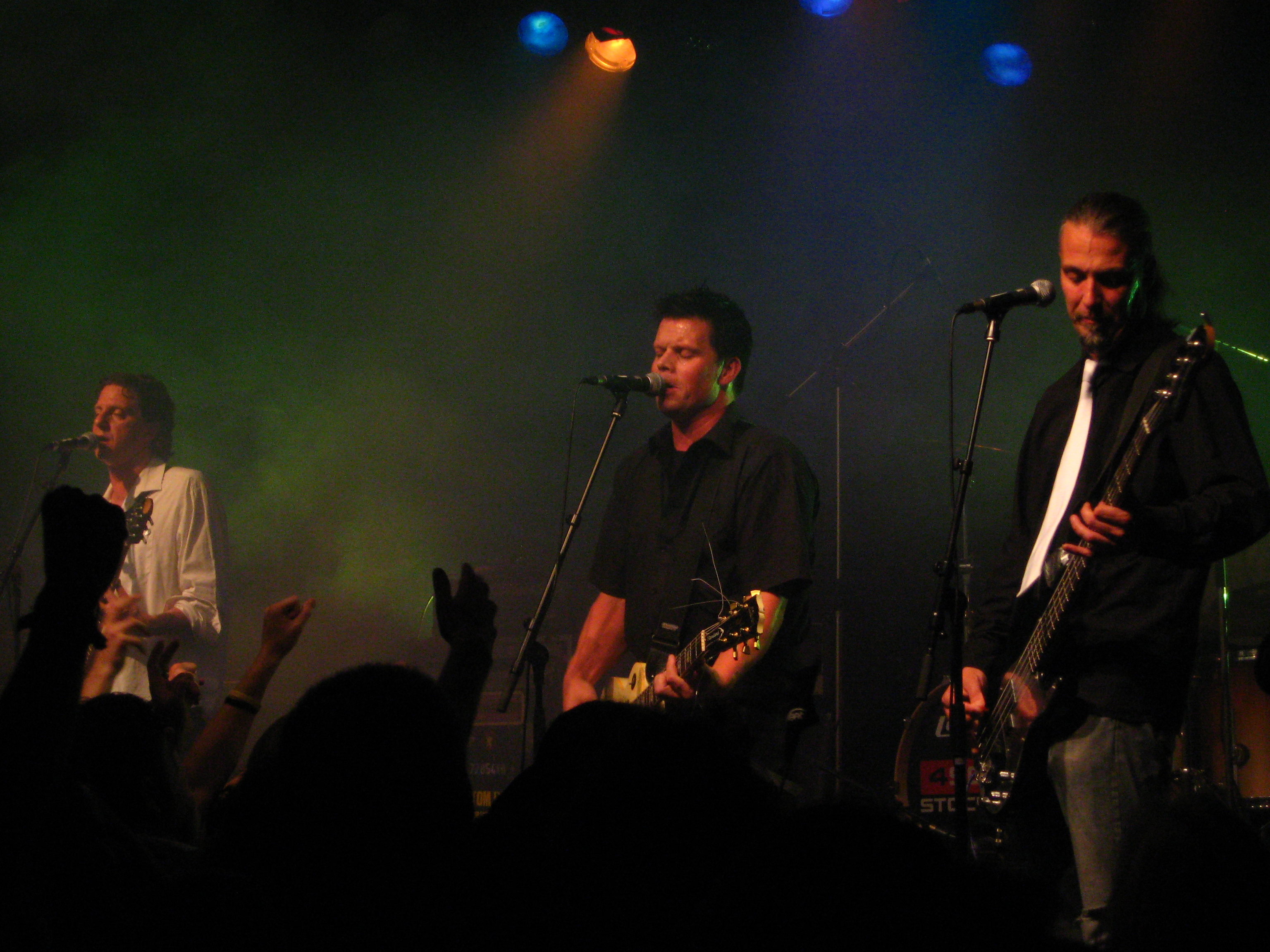
- Coca Carola (reunited) plays at Beat Butcher's 25-year jubilee in 2009.

Background information
- Origin: Åkersberga, Sweden
- Genres: punk, trallpunk, rock
- Years active: 1986–2004, 2012, 2013, 2023–
- Label: Beat Butchers
- Members: Curt "Curre" Sandgren (guitar & vocals) Åke Noring (bass & backing vocals); Jonas Winberg (guitar & backing vocals) Mårten Tolander (drums)

Coca Carola is a Swedish punk band formed in Åkersberga in 1986. Signed to the Swedish record label Beat Butchers, they were active and recognized in the Swedish punk scene during the years 1986–2004. In 2023, after a long hiatus, the band has begun to tour again.

== History ==
At the beginning, the band consisted of musicians who had been fired from their previous bands: Curt "Curre" Sandgren (former member of the band Rolands Gosskör), Mårten Tolander, "Ostron" Åkerholm, and Björn Gullberg. in 1987, Coca Carola released a self-titled single, and after this Gullberg left the band. For a short time, Putte Strand joined the band as a guitarist. He was replaced by Conny Melkersson, who had played with Sandgren in the band Rolands Gosskör.

In 1988, Coca Carola, together with the band 23 Till, recorded their first LP titled Anabola melodier. Coca Carola was responsible for the first half of the album.

In the summer of 1991, Coca Carola released the single C/C 7 Inch; the three songs on this single used English-language lyrics. Busy with his other band Nein, Melkersson left the band. Coca Carola found a new guitarist, Jonas Winberg. In the fall of 1992, the band's debut album titled Tigger & ber was released, and the band toured Germany. They played at the Hultsfred Festival and toured with De lyckliga kompisarna.

In January 1994, Coca Carola released their second album, Läckert. Later that year, bassist Åkerholm left the band because it was taking too much of his time. Since the band had planned to release a single in the fall of 1994, Åke Noring (also from Rolands Gosskör) temporarily played bass in Coca Carola. Jonas Mellberg, who was a member of the band Håkan sover naken joined Coca Carola, and remained their bass player until 2004.

In September 1994, Coca Carola released the EP Klubben för inbördes beundran, whose first track, "Inbördes beundran", reached 37th place on the Swedish singles charts.

In early 1996, Coca Carola released their third album, Dagar kommer. For the band's 10th anniversary later that year, the collection ...fem år till moped was released. This album contained several new songs, as well as older rare tracks. In 1997, the band took a hiatus, but returned in 1998 with a new album Så fel som bara vi kan ha.

In December 1998, Coca Carola received a request to write songs for a compilation album for the soccer team Djurgårdens IF. The band accepted, and wrote nine new songs, including Min tröja.

In 2000, their fifth studio album was recorded and released, Feber. In 2004, Coca Carola released their most recent album Kryp din Jävel and played their final gig at Fregatten in Åkersberga. Soon after that, Curre Sandgren and Jonas Mellberg started a new band, called Den sista leken, which released an album the same year.

In 2012, Coca Carola reunited for a gig at the festival Peace & Love in Borlänge and for an unpublicized concert at Kafé 44 in Stockholm. The following year, they played with Charta 77 and Johan Johansson, among others, at an event in Stockholm; this performance was dedicated to the Peace & Love festival, which had gone bankrupt.

In 2023, Coca Carola started to play again regularly. Their reunion concert took place at The Public in their hometown of Åkersberga in January 2023. In February 2023, the band participated in "Ögir will arise" at Frimis in Örebro, a benefit to support the rebuilding of Per Granberg's music bar Ögir, which burned down in 2022. Coca Carola's next gig in August 2023 was even larger: at Gröna Lund. This performance included Jonas Mellberg as a guest artist. In 2024, Coca Carola have committed to a benefit concert for guitarist Micke Blomquist, organized by Asta Kask.

7th of September 2025 the band informed the fans that drummer and founding member Mårten Tolander had died, and that before his death he had found a replacement drummer, David Persson.

In November 2025 their new album "När sen är försent" was released, their first one since 2004.

== Band members ==
Current line-up:

- Curt Erik Torvald "Curre" Sandgren – guitar & vocals
- Jonas Winbe after a long time illness, auitar & backing vocals
- Åke Norling – bass & backing vocals
- David Persson – drums

Previous/temporary members:

- Mårten Tolander - drums
- Jonas Mellberg – bass & backing vocals
- Ostron Åkerholm – bass
- Björn Gullberg – guitar, vocals
- Conny Melkersson – guitar
- Putte Strand – guitar

== Discography ==
=== Studio albums ===
1. 1988: Anabola melodier (Studio Otukt)
2. 1992: Tigger & ber (Beat Butchers)
3. 1994: Läckert (Beat Butchers)
4. 1996: Dagar kommer (Beat Butchers)
5. 1998: Så fel som bara vi kan ha (Beat Butchers)
6. 2000: Feber (Beat Butchers)
7. 2004: Kryp Din Jävel (Beat Butchers)

=== Live albums ===
- 2000: Live i Kalmar, Järnkaminerna
- 2001: Kom och slå mig igen
- 2002: Live i Sundsvall
- 2004: En sista gång på 44:an

=== Compilations ===
- 1996: ...fem år till moped
- 2012: Samlade

=== EPs ===
- 1994: Dimmornas land
- 1994: Klubben för inbördes beundran

=== Singles ===
- 1987: Kom till kriget (self-titled 7inch)
- 1991: C/C 7"
- 2015: Tack för festen

=== Samplers (selected) ===
- 1995: Äggröran 1 (Ägg Tapes & Records)
- 1998: Definitivt 50 Spänn 7
- 1998: Definitivt The Greatest Hits
- 2001: Definitivt 50 Spänn 10
- 2007: Svenska Punkklassiker Vol. 2
