= Takahashi Gumi =

Takahashi Gumi is a trallpunk band from Japan inspired by bands like Asta Kask, Strebers and Radioaktiva Räker. Their CD Trall I La La was jointly published by Hipcat Records and Waterslide Records. They have also participated in the 2006 compilation Tralleluja no 1 by Fundamentalismus Records.
