= Le som en fotomodell =

Studio album by De Lyckliga Kompisarna
- Released: 1991
- Genre: Trallpunk
- Label: Birdnest Records
- Producer: Mart Hällgren

De Lyckliga Kompisarna chronology
Le som en fotomodell (1991)	Tomat (1993)

Le som en fotomodell (’Smile Like a Model’) is a studio album made by Swedish punk band De Lyckliga Kompisarna. The album was released in 1991 and was the first of DLK's four studio albums.

== Track listing ==
The album was originally released on vinyl with songs 1-14. The track listing below represents the CD release.

1. "Troll och häxor", 2.10 (Trolls And Witches)
2. "Ölstugan som inte finns", 1.54 (The Beer Tavern That Doesn't Exist)
3. "Egon", 4.08 (Egos (But also a Swedish mans name))
4. "Allmosor", 1.52 (Alms)
5. "Impad", 2.41 (Impressed)
6. "Vi är de lyckliga kompisarna", 2.25 (We Are The Happy Friends)
7. "Kofångare", 1.27 (Cowcatcher)
8. "Tänk om jag vore...", 2.55 (What If I Were...)
9. "Le som en fotomodell", 3.50 (Smile Like A Model)
10. "CP framför sin TV", 3.09 (CP In Front Of His TV)
11. "Smet", 4.01 (Ran away)
12. "Evigt liv", 3.05 (Eternal Life)
13. "Där värmen tar vid", 2.03 (Where The Warmth Begins)
14. "Dricka sprit och hålla käften", 3.27 (Drinking Liquor And Shutting Up)
15. "Dit kuken pekar", 2.49 (The Way The Cock Points)
16. "Scania-hjon", 3.02 (Scania-servant)
17. "Röd fredag/Syndabock", 3.48 (Red Friday / Scapegoat)
18. "Hallucinationer i himmelen", 2.50 (Hallucinations In Heaven)

Confusion surrounds track 17 on the CD release. On the track listing at the back of the album "Röd fredag" is listed as track 17. However, "Syndabock" is track 17 on the record, as well as inside the lyrics leaflet. It was later explained by the front member Mart Hellgren on their official website's guestbook that the song was first named "Syndabock", but later renamed to "Röd Fredag", but they forgot to change the song's name inside the leaflet.
