= Bo Nilsson =

Swedish composer and lyricist (1937–2018)

Bo Nilsson (1 May 1937 – 25 June 2018) was a Swedish composer and lyricist.

== Career ==
Bo Nilsson was born in Skellefteå, and first drew notice as a composer at the age of 18 when his Zwei Stücke (Two Pieces) for flute, bass clarinet, percussion, and piano were performed in a 1956 Westdeutscher Rundfunk “Musik der Zeit” concert in Cologne. He had taught himself composition by listening to the radio, having previously had only basic training from a local music teacher and some experience as a jazz pianist. Though his early style owes much to Pierre Boulez and Karlheinz Stockhausen, it also displays a number of personal features: the use of bright percussion sounds behind finely wrought vocal or flute (usually alto flute) lines, a “nervous” fluttering of tonal nuances, and a feeling for miniature, calculated forms. Because he has chosen to live in the small town of Malmberget, he received the journalistic epithet "the genius from Malmberget".

By 1957 Nilsson remained largely unknown in his own country, but had attracted considerable attention in Germany with a succession of small chamber-music compositions characterised by their unusual instrumentation. The best-known of these is Frequensen (German: Frequenzen, 1957) for piccolo, flute, vibraphone, xylophone, electric guitar, double bass, and percussion.

== Electronic music ==
In the late 1950s Nilsson composed a twelve-page score for his first electronic work, Audiogramme, with only radio broadcasts and the published score of Stockhausen's Studie II as sources upon which to draw, since he did not have access to electronic equipment at that time. He submitted the score to the electronic-music studio at WDR in the hopes of having it produced there, and Gottfried Michael Koenig agreed to take on the role of "interpreter", even while expressing doubts about the composer's reliance on the "established style" of Stockhausen's Studien. By the time the realisation was completed in 1958 Nilsson, without yet having heard the results, had completed another electronic piece and was planning a third. That second work, titled Würfelspiel (Dice Game), was also realised at the WDR studio; there is some doubt whether the third piece, Zellen (1958), was ever brought to completion.

== Style and technique ==
In the 1950s, critics assumed that Nilsson employed the serial techniques of the composers whose style he was imitating, and whose notational devices his scores borrowed. In 1961, however, he created a scandal in Sweden and Germany when he published an article in which he admitted that he had been "bluffing", and had merely used his ear to create music in the Darmstadt School style. Despite this public confession, he is still sometimes described in reference works as a "serialist", and even as "one of the first to serialize open-form and chance techniques". Nilsson had encouraged the assumption that serialism was used in his compositions in part by peppering his scores with numbers. Complicated rhythms were designated by numerical proportions (e.g., 4:5, 7:8, 8:9, 3:16), and dynamics were sometimes specified numerically, as when he introduced a dynamic scale of 1.0 to 10.5 in Quantitäten for piano. Another method of perpetuating this myth was by providing mathematical formulas claimed to be the basis of aspects of the music. When Wolfgang Steinecke quoted one of these claims in a radio program, the German newspapers picked it up and spread the story. In fact, Nilsson had simply copied out formulas related to the integrals of rational functions, often with errors, from books belonging to his uncle Oka.

Beginning with Entrée for orchestra and tape (1962), Nilsson turned to a neoromantic style, and later in the 1960s he wrote film and television scores, for example Hemsöborna (1966) and Röda Rummet.

Entrée was commissioned by Swedish Radio for the last concert in the 1962–63 season of Nutida musik, a concert that also served to open the Stockholm Festival (hence the work's title). Symbolic also of the beginning of a new phase in Nilsson's work, Entrée explores extremes. It includes a variety of musical styles and dynamics ranging from extremely soft to extremely loud, using an orchestra with a greatly expanded percussion section including oil drums, steel discs, marble plates, pots, pans, and bottles. There are just two short insertions of electronic music, which were realised with the assistance of Karl-Erik Welin. They are overlaid with sparse orchestral music played live, and consist of vague, almost deliberately colourless sounds.

== Compositions ==
Amongst his most important works are Quantitäten for solo piano (1957), Ett blocks timme for soprano and chamber ensemble after a text by Öyvind Fahlström, Brief an Gösta Oswald (a trilogy of cantatas composed 1958–62, consisting of Ein irrender Sohn for alto voice, alto flute, and chamber ensemble, Mädchentotenlieder for soprano voice, alto flute, and chamber ensemble, and Und die Zeiger seiner Augen wurden langsam zurückgedreht for alto or soprano voice and orchestra), Drei Szenen for orchestra (1960–61), Entrée for orchestra (1962), and Fatumeh for reciter, choir, rock-group, and symphony orchestra (1971).

== Honours and awards ==
Nilsson received an honorary doctorate from the Luleå University of Technology. On this occasion, the University commissioned a portrait of Nilsson by artist Echi Åberg.

== Writings ==
- "Aktuella kompositionsproblem". Nutida musik 1, n. 2 (1957–58), 6–7.
- Spaderboken. Stockholm: Bonnier, 1966.
- Missilen eller Livet i en mössa. Gällivare: Gellivare sockens hembygdsfören, 1994. ISBN 91-971835-3-9.
