= Birdnest =

Birdnest may refer to:

- Bird nest - For birds
- Birdnest wiring - Electronic interconnection used for prototyping and high frequency applications
- Birdnest Records - Swedish punk record company
