= Finito =

Finito (from Italian) means "finished", "over". It may also refer to:

- Ramón "Finito" Rivera, a performer of the salon tango, see Argentine tango § Salon tango.
- Ricardo "Finito" López (1966), retired Mexican boxer.
- Finito de Badajoz, member of Spanish rock/punk band Reincidentes.
- Mike Finito, producer of the mixtape Nehru Jackets by rapper Himanshu Suri.
- The final album by Swedish group Radioaktiva räker (2003).
- The B side of the single Mondo (1976) by Riccardo Fogli.
- A promotional single (2011) for the album Student of the Game by American hip hop artist N.O.R.E. (a.k.a. P.A.P.I).

== See also ==
- Non finito, a sculpting technique.
- Faneto, a song by Chief Keef
