= Beat Butchers =

Swedish record label

- Founded: 1991
- Genre: Punk
- Country of origin: Sweden

Beat Butchers is a Swedish record label mostly dealing in punk, especially trallpunk. They started in 1991, but had earlier published music under the name Studio otukt records.

== Signed bands ==
- 23 Till
- Alarmrock
- Asta Kask
- Brandgul
- Coca Carola
- Hans & Greta
- Inferno
- Krapotkin
- Krymplings
- Köttgrottorna
- Nittonhundratalsräven
- Ohlson Har Semester Production
- Parkinsons
- Per Bertil Birgers Orkester
- Radioaktiva Räker
- Roger Karlsson
- Rolands Gosskör
- Sista Skriket
- Slutstation Tjernobyl
- Solar Lodge
- Svart Snö
- Varnagel
- Åka Bil
