= Jan W. Morthenson =

Swedish composer and music critic (1940–2024)

- Born: April 7, 1940; Örnsköldsvik, Sweden
- Died: October 22, 2024 (aged 84) Stockholm, Sweden
- Occupations: Composer, music critic, writer

Jan Wilhelm Morthenson (7 April 1940 – 22 October 2024) was a prominent Swedish composer, critic, and writer primarily known for his criticism of music in Sweden and his compositional styles of non-figurative music, music that aimed to avoid any relationship to past compositional techniques, and meta-music, which alluded to historical music genres in order to criticize them. Morthenson's success as a composer and intellect in Sweden is reflected by the influential positions he has held throughout his career. He was on the board for the Electronic Music Studio from 1973 to 1975, he acted as chairman of the Swedish section of the International Society for Contemporary Music (ICSM) from 1974 to 1975, he was vice-chairman of the ISCM council from 1975 to 1978, and he was also the chairman for Fylkingen, a Swedish chamber music society that focuses primarily on new music, from 1975 to 1976.

== Training ==
Morthenson was born in Örnsköldsvik, Sweden in 1940 and began studying music in Stockholm in 1956 with Runar Mangs, a prominent Swedish music critic. Mangs left a lasting impression on young Morthenson, who would later refer to him in an obituary as one of the most important contemporary music critics in Sweden. Four years after Morthenson began working with Mangs, he went on to study privately with Ingvar Lindholm in 1960, and premiered his first public work, Wechselspeil I (1960) for solo cello. The significance of Wechselspeil I was perpetuated by Morthenson's status as a young member of Fylkingen, which he joined in the same year. Following his time with Lindholm, Morthenson attended Uppsala University to study aesthetics and furthered his study as a composer through private lessons with Gottfried Michael Köenig at the electronic music studio in Cologne. He also studied with Heinz-Klaus Metzger, who would write a long preface to Morthenson's only book Non-figurative Musik in 1966.

== Career ==
=== 1960s: Early style and philosophy ===
Morthenson made a name for himself as a prominent young composer and intellectual in the 1960s. He became highly active in the Swedish musical community, composing orchestral, vocal, chamber, and tape pieces, and writing numerous academic articles in the Swedish journal Nutida Musik. Fueled by his belief that traditional compositional techniques had been exhausted and future composers would need to create something brand new in order to progress their art, Morthenson's main focus and contribution in the 60s was his non-figurative music. Beginning in 1962 with Coloratura III (1962-63), Morthenson's non-figurative period was characterized by the avoidance of all traditional musical gestures, tools, and goals, resulting in a focus on timbre and density of sound, using these as compositional building blocks.

One of Morthenson's preferred instruments for non-figurative music is the organ. He states in an interview with Björn Gottstein in August 2008 that composing for organ, a medium that he preferred for his non-figurative music, and his work with Karl Erik Welin was a doorway into the world of electronic music, and in 1967 he composed the first Swedish computer-assisted work Neutron Star (1967) in collaboration with Göran Sundqvist. Morthenson developed a close relationship Welin and consequentially wrote numerous pieces for organ, which Welin played around the world, including: Some of These (1961), Encores (1964), Eternes (1965), Decadenza I (1968), and Farewell (1970). Among these, Decadenza I, and Farewell were the first examples of Morthenson's meta-music, or music about music, which became his prominent style during the 1970s.

=== 1970s: Meta-music ===
In the 1970s, following his non-figurative music period, Morthenson continued to criticize music from another perspective, developing a new style of composition for which he coined the term meta-music. Like his non-figurative music, meta-music stemmed from Morthenson's pessimistic view of musical development, but rather than avoiding any allusion to historical reference in his new style, Morthenson began to use past genres in order to criticize them. For example, in the string quartet Ancora (1983)–his only piece to feature direct quotes, which come from Balkan, Greek, and Turkish folk songs–Morthenson begins with a peaceful Dodecanese folk tune in the cello. As the piece progresses, it becomes increasingly more intense and modernistic, representing Morthenson's belief that folk and avant-garde music probably cannot exist simultaneously for much longer.

His other meta-music works deliver similar commentary related to his critical view of the development of music. A non-exhaustive list of these pieces includes Decadenze I, Farewell, Senza (1970), Collosus (1970), Labor (1971), and Alla Marcia (1974), criticizing church music, requiems, string repertoire, orchestral works, virtuoso solos, and militaristic genres, respectively.

=== 1980s to present day ===
The final style that Morthenson adhered to in his music and writings is what he refers to as existentialist music. Feeling that his career was reaching an end, he wrote Epilogos (2008), which represents his work as a composer and also commemorates the death of his wife. In an interview with Björn Gottstein in February 2008, Morthenson reflected on his career, stating: “I have worked with three major aspects of music in my life. First of all, what I call non-figurative music... And then I worked with what I called meta-music, music about music. And this last stage I work with what I call existentialist music. And that is a music without any specific meaning. Without any specific goal. And without any specific technique or will to get to something, some result of any kind. It is just like life, I think. You walk around and look at things and you wonder what they are and what their meaning is, and you don't always find out.”
