= Nutida musik =

Music Association

Nutida Musik was Sweden's largest music association at one time. Located in Västerås, Sweden the association was a central hub for the local youth and touring musicians. Archives from the Association are available for the years 1970 to 1989. However, the association remained active in the 1990s. Nutida Musik later became a leading member of Kontaktnätet.

== Location and venues ==
The association was located in an old brick complex in the center of Västerås. The building was a brewery before the organization took it over. Locally, this house was known as "Bryggis", which in Swedish is a nickname for "brewery". Many concerts were held in a hall named "Valvet" ("The Vault") in the basement of Bryggis. Nutida musik also frequently used other venues, including the larger "88:an" ("The 88") and various state-owned places.

Nutida Musik also organized a yearly outdoors festival in the center of Västerås. It was free of charge and used mobile stages.

== Founders and board ==
The musician Pugh Rogefeldt was a founder of Nutida Musik. Later Mikael Karlmark led the way to enlarging and developing the association. Karlmark was on the Board between 1984 and 1990. Daniel Green was employed as head of bookings, concerts and other activities during 1985-1987 (predeccesed by Anders Altzarfeldt). He initiated and completed the compilation album "elva band" recorded at MNW studios in Waxholm, Stockholm. On the album 11 local bands perform one song each. Among them Arabesque (with Welcome to China), Unchained (with Victims of Paradise), Joan of Arc, and others. Nutida musik grew to approximately 2200 members by 1990, the largest size in its existence, and was at some points the biggest un-commercial music organisation in Sweden.

== Other activities ==
Nutida Musik operated rehearsal studios for local musicians, had activities for unemployed people, and provided work for both unemployed and the young of the town. A photostudio and a café were set up in "Bryggis".

Numerous musical groups have played at the venues operated by the association. Some of these groups are: D.A.D, Smådjävlar, The Nomads, Imperiet, Tant Strul, Pink Champagne, Leather Nun, Stockholms Negrer, Danielle Dax, Sator Codex, Blue for Two (med Freddie Wadling), Scandal Beauties, Man Klan, Lolita Pop, 6-10 Redlös, Strebers, Charta 77, TST, Grimjacks, Dynamite Wasteland, Whit Monday, Incest Brothers, Köttgrottorna, Twice a Man, Front 242.

== Trivia ==
Members of Sator have answered the question of which concert of theirs was the worst with - Västerås. The concert in question was when the group played under the name of Sator Codex and the audience numbered less than ten people, including the staff.

At one time, the association reputedly turned down the then upcoming band Hanoi Rocks. They ended up playing in a neighbouring town to a large and sold-out venue.

The association made headlines in the late 80's when someone set fire to the attic of "Bryggis". Media coverage showed staff saving equipment in the middle of the night.
