= Rasta Knast =

German punk band

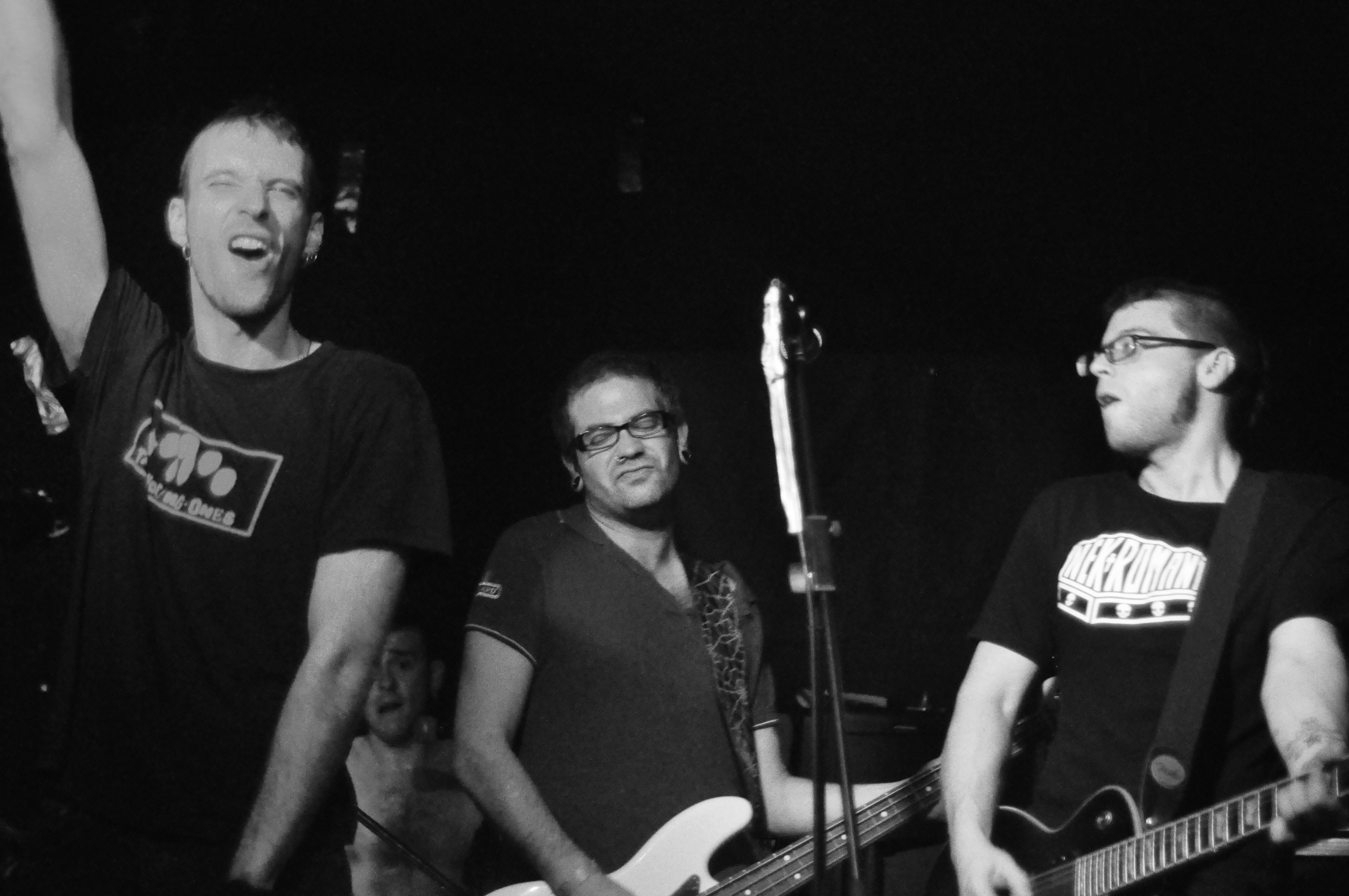
- Rasta Knast in Rostock, Germany in 2012

Background information
- Origin: Celle, Germany
- Genres: Deutschpunk, trallpunk
- Years active: 1997—present
- Labels: Plastic Bomb Records, Höhnie Records, Nasty Vinyl
- Members: Martin K. (vocals, guitar); Atti (vocals, guitar); Dom (bass, vocals); Nils (drums)
- Website: www.rasta-knast.de

Rasta Knast is a German punk band founded in the city of Celle, Germany in 1997. The band name is a playful reference to the Swedish punk band Asta Kask, known as a foundational band of Swedish punk rock, and the musical genre trallpunk. Rasta Knast's music is in the musical style of trallpunk, but generally uses German-language lyrics rather than Swedish-language lyrics. They have covered songs from Swedish punk bands Asta Kask, Radioaktiva Räker, and the Troublemakers.

Rasta Knast has released four studio albums, the last two of which are on the German punk label Plastic Bomb, associated with Plastic Bomb Fanzine (established 1993). They have sold more than 30,000 copies of their albums. Rasta Knast have toured nationally in Germany as well as Sweden, Norway, Brasil, Japan, England, Ireland, Russia, and Spain. They have contributed to several long-running, and well-known series of German punk rock compilations, including Weird System's Punk Rock BRD and Höhnie Records' Sicher gibt es bessere Zeiten series of compilation albums.

== History ==
The band was founded by Martin Kliems and Andreas Höhn (of Höhnie Records and Nasty Vinyl), who had a common love of trallpunk. Within two days they had produced the EP Prøbegepøgt. This EP included one original song from Rasta Knast, as well as three covers of Asta-Kask songs: (1) the song Staatsdiktatur is a German translation of the Asta Kask song Politysk tortyr, (2) the song Kein Licht is a German translation of the Asta Kask song Inget Ljus, and (3) the song TV is a cover of the Asta Kast song of the same name.

At this point, the project officially became a band. They persuaded two former members of the band Wonderprick, Holger and Martin, to join on bass and drums. However, soon Carsten Zisowsky and Konrad Kittner (a former member of the band Abstürzende Brieftauben) replaced them on drums and bass respectively.

With this line-up, Rasta Knast's first full studio album Legal Kriminal was recorded in January 1998. This recording features Martin K. on guitar, bass, drums and vocals, along with Andreas Höhn on guitar and vocals. Konrad Kittner provided back-up vocals. The album included covers of Swedish punk songs with lyrics translated into German, including Legale Verbrecher (cover of Asta Kask's Det är snett), and Aufruhrzeit (cover of Asta Kask's PS. 474).

In October 1999, the band released their second album Die Katze beißt in Draht. This album included a cover of the Swedish punk band the Troublemaker's song Vill ha, translated into German as Will haben. With this second album, Rasta Knast began working through several line-up changes; presently Martin K. is the only original member still active in the band. For their second album, Carsten was replaced on drums by Eric, who was later replaced by Phil "Phill" Hill (former member of Antikörper).

In 2000, Rasta Knast recorded the EP Turistas alemanes asesin@s, together with three guest singers from Mallorcaos-Punx that sang in Spanisch. On this EP there are three cover songs from Spanish punk bands.

In the summer of 2000, Konrad Kittner left the band for health reasons. Rasta Knast broke up, to be re-founded shortly after by Martin K. along with Florentin Shock (former member of The Annoyed) on guitar and backup vocals, and Thomas "Cpt. Planlos" (from Leistungsgruppe Maulich) on bass.

In 2001, Rasta Knast released their 3rd album Bandera Pirata, which included two cover songs from bands from South America. In 2003 they released a split LP/CD of cover songs, titled Marcas da revolta with the Brazilian hardcore punk band Agrotóxico.

In the fall of 2003 Rasta Knast released a split EP Kanpai with the Japanese punk band Crispy Nuts. This EP was recorded with Peter "Hecktor" Blümer (of the band Hass). After a tour of Brasil in 2004, Rasta Knast broke up for the second time.

In 2007, Rasta Knast released the live album Live in São Paulo. Because the band members were geographically dispersed in different cities (Celle, Hamburg and also Prague) Peter and Phil left the band in June 2008. Rasta Knast moved on with Dom (from Mighty Mopped) on bass, Ballo (former member of Gashebel, and Kommando-Kap-Hoorn) on drums, and Atti (of the band Kasa, former member of WKA) on rhythm guitar. Ballo left the band in the summer of 2010, and was replaced by Rasta Knast's current drummer Nils (from Reset//Mankind, former member of Kollateral, and Not Really).

In January 2009 Rasta Knast released the EP Friede, Freude, Untergang. In 2010 they released the album Tertius Decimus, which includes pieces from all of the phases of Rasta Knast's history, in part re-recorded. This compilation album was released on Destiny Records, for the band's 13th anniversary. On July 20, 2012, Rasta Knast released their fourth studio album Trallblut; the name of this album refers to the punk subgenre trallpunk. In 2023 the band release a split EP with Dv Hvnd which included the single Die Ferne So Nah. Rasta Knast has described this song as being against racism and antisemitism.

== Discography ==
=== Studio albums ===
1. Legal Kriminal (Mini-LP/CD, 1998/1999, Höhnie Records)
2. Die Katze beißt in Draht (LP/CD, 1999, Red Star Recordings)
3. Bandera Pirata (LP/CD, 2001, Plastic Bomb Records)
4. Trallblut (LP/CD, 2012, Plastic Bomb Records)

=== EPs ===
1. Prøbegepøgt (EP, 1997)
2. Turistas alemanes asesin@s (EP, 2000)
3. Varning! (Split-EP with Troublemakers, 2000)
4. Marcas da revolta (Split-LP/CD with Agrotóxico, 2003)
5. Kanpai (Split-EP with Crispy Nuts, 2003)
6. Friede, Freude, Untergang (EP/MCD, 2008/2009)
7. Rasta Knast / Dv Hvnd (Split EP, 2023, Sterbt Alle Records)

=== Live Albums ===
- Live in São Paulo (CD, 2007)

=== Compilation Albums ===
- Tertius Decimus (CD 2010)

=== Samplers ===
- Sicher gibt es bessere Zeiten Vol. 6 (1997 Höhnie Records)
- Punk Christmas Vol. 2 (1997 Nasty Vinyl)
- Deutschpunk Kampflieder Vol. 2 (1998 AGR)
- BRD Punk Terror Vol. 2 (1998 Nasty Vinyl)
- Blitzkrieg over you! (Ramones Tribute, Rasta Knast contributed a cover of Teenage Lobotomy) (1998 Nasty Vinyl)
- Mia san ned Marionetz (Tribute Compilation) (1999 Höhnie Records)
- Äggröran Vol. IV (1999 Ägg Rec.SW)
- Definitivt 50 spänn Vol.8 (1999 Birdnest, SW)
- Röjarskivan Vol. IV (2000 Ägg Rec.SW)
- Partisanen Vol. 5 (2000 Day-Glo Records)
- Definitivt 50 spänn Vol. 9 (2000 Birdnest, SW)
- Nasty Vinyl Sucks (2002 Nasty Vinyl)
- BRD Punk Terror Vol. 4 (2002 Nasty Vinyl)
- Punk Rock BRD (2003 Weird System)
- Peace Attack Vol. 2 (2003 Impact Records)
- Labelsampler "Leben Lachen Kämpfen" (2004 Plastic Bomb)
- Punk Rock BRD Vol. II 2004 (Weird System)
- BRD Punk Terror Vol. 5 (2006 SPV)
