= Re Voltere =

Studio album by Dia Psalma
- Released: 2009
- Recorded: August – September 2008
- Genre: Folk rock, punk rock, metal, alternative rock
- Length: 54 minutes

Dia Psalma chronology
Djupa Skogen (2007)	Re Voltere (2009)

Re Voltere is the Swedish punk group Dia Psalma's fifth studio album, the second after they reunited in 2006. The song "Kulisser" was shot as a video in 2008.

== Track listing ==
No.	Title	Eng translation	Length
1.	"Kulisser"	Coulisses	3:52
2.	"För Martyrernas Skull"	For the Sake of the Martyres	3:33
3.	"Igen & Igen"	Again & Again	4:27
4.	"Stormarnas Rådslag"	The Consultation of the Storms	4:10
5.	"Kalle Iskall"	Kalle the Icecold	4:34
6.	"Far Med Osanning"		5:00
7.	"Tre Historier"	Three Stories	2:09
8.	"Från Och Med Nu"	From Now On	3:32
9.	"Mental Rigor Mortis"	Mental Rigor Mortis	2:51
10.	"Djupa Skogen"	The Deep Forest	5:34
11.	"Enskede Gård 16.11"	Enskede Gård 16.11	3:42
12.	"Ave Crux Spes Unica"	Ave Crux Spes Unica	4:32
13.	"Gryningstid"	Time of Dawn	2:17
14.	"Världen i Detalj"	The World in Detail	4:49

== Credits ==
=== Band ===
- Ulke, Guitars and vocals
- Pontus, Guitars and backing vocals
- Ztikkan, Bass and backing vocals
- Stipen, Percussion

=== Guests ===
- Johan Andersson, Violin
- Anna Brodin, Cello
- Mikael Galloni, Speaking voice on "Kalle Iskall"

== Chart positions ==
Chart (2009)	Peak position
Swedish Albums (Sverigetopplistan)	21
