= Psamlade Psalmer =

Compilation album by Dia Psalma
- Released: 2006
- Recorded: 1992–1996
- Genre: Folk rock, punk rock, metal, alternative rock

Dia Psalma chronology
Sell Out (1996)	Psamlade Psalmer (2006)	Djupa Skogen (2007)

Psamlade Psalmer is a compilation album by Swedish punk band Dia Psalma. It was released in 2006 after it was announced that the band would reunite and play together for the first time since 1996. The double CD with 23 songs on each includes all the songs they've recorded.

The name "Psamlade Psalmer" is a play with their band name. "Samlade Psalmer" is Swedish meaning "Collected Psalms", and the extra P in "Psamlade" is to play with the two words. Direct translation therefore is "Pcollected Psalms".

The majority of the songs are in Swedish, but the collection also includes "We Love You" (English version of "Vi älskar dig"), "Trash Future Dance", "World", "Rock You", and covers of "Love Gun" (Kiss) and "For Whom the Bell Tolls" (Metallica).

== Track listing ==
=== CD 1 ===
1. Vad har du kvar
2. I fädrens spår
3. Hundra kilo kärlek
4. Hon kom över mon
5. Ack högaste himmel
6. Mördarvals
7. Emelie
8. Hon får...
9. Tro rätt tro fel
10. Språk
11. Vemodsvals
12. Gryningsvisa i D-moll
13. Alla älskar dig
14. Atomvinternatt
15. Balladen om lilla Elsa
16. Jag tror på allt
17. Vi svartnar
18. Den som spar
19. Luft
20. Illusioner
21. Kalla sinnen
22. Ditt samvetes armé
23. Mamma

=== CD 2 ===
1. United States of Europe
2. Trash future dance
3. Love Gun (Kiss cover)
4. Grytfot
5. Planeter
6. Del I
7. Bara ord
8. Rock you
9. Requiem
10. We love you
11. Hon får... (single version)
12. Bärsärkar-marsch
13. Höstmåne
14. For Whom the Bell Tolls (Metallica cover)
15. Efter allt
16. World
17. Skymningstid
18. I evighet
19. Sol över oss
20. Alla dör för ingenting
21. Del II
22. Motorbreath
23. Öga för öga
