= Djupa Skogen =

Studio album by Dia Psalma
- Released: 2007
- Recorded: Spring 2007
- Genre: Folk rock, punk rock, metal, alternative rock

Dia Psalma chronology
Psamlade Psalmer (2006)	Djupa Skogen (2007)	Re Voltere (2009)

Djupa Skogen ("Deep Forest") is the Swedish punk group Dia Psalma's fourth studio album, the first one to be released after they reunited in 2006. It featured eleven brand new tracks as well as a remake of their song "Öga för öga". The only single of the album was "Som Man Är" ("As You Are").

== Track listing ==
1. Norrsken
2. Lösningen
3. Blod
4. Spelet helvetet
5. Här & nu
6. Barn av eran tid
7. Som man är
8. Saknaden
9. Precis
10. Mitt Fönster
11. Öga för öga
12. Historien

== Chart positions ==
Chart (2007)	Peak position
Swedish Albums (Sverigetopplistan)	13
