= Rövsvett =

Punk rock band

- Origin: Tranås, Jönköping County, Sweden
- Genres: punk rock
- Years active: 1983–present
- Labels: Birdnest Records • Bucho Discos • Just4Fun Records • SixWeeks Records

Rövsvett is a hardcore punk rock band from Sweden. It was formed in 1983 in Tranås, Jönköping County. The name is approximately translated as "Ass sweat".

Their records were released mostly by labels Birdnest Records, Bucho Discos, Just4Fun Records, and SixWeeks Records.

== Discography ==
=== Albums ===
- Hunden beskyddar människan men vem beskyddar hunden?? (Röv tapes) (1984) (cassette)
- Afflicted cries in the darkness of war w/Anticimex, Crude S.S.&Fear Of War. (New Face Records) (1986)
- Sällan studsar en termos Split-LP w/Plague (Punish Records) (1988)
- Fatal farts CD (Birdnest Records) (1993)
- Den falske kakaoinspektören 1st CD (Birdnest Records) (1994)
- Burn the gay nuns CD (Birdnest Records) (1996)
- All makt åt mig 2nd CD (Birdnest Records) (1998)
- Kick Ass 3rd LP/CD (Six Weeks Records) (2001)
- Thithma Karin 4th LP (Six Weeks Records) (2003)
- Boll-Mats bjuder på bullkalas&kaffe 1984-1987 (Six Weeks Records) (2005)
- Sorgedödaren 5th LP (Six Weeks Records)(2008)
- Den falske kakaoinspektören LP (Birdnest Records/Threat from the past/RR) (2019)
- Jesus var en Tomte LP (Just4Fun Records/Röv Records) (2020)
- Tranås CD (Criminal Attack Records)(2021)
- We are the roadkill 6th LP (Cimex Records)(2022)
- Sällan studsar en termos 10" (Just4Fun Records/Röv Records) (2023)
- Den stora brakfesten Live CD (Just4Fun Records/Röv Records)(2024)
- En kväll på Liseberg Live LP (Sockiplast Records)(2024)

=== EPs ===
- Jesus var en Tomte (Röv Records) (1985)
- Ett psykiskt drama i 7 akter (Röv Records) (1986)
- Split 7" med Raped Teenagers (C.B.R./Chicken Brain Records) (1990)
- Lepra Cliff (Jesus Kudd Records) (1991)
- 4 nedräkningen (Birdnest Records) (1994)
- Rövsvett i nacken (PAS-83) (2000)
- Split 7" med Fett (Big Nose Production) (2002)
- The Dwarf (Bucho Discos) (2003)
- Kängor&shorts (Bucho Discos) (2004)
- Hunden beskyddar människan men vem beskyddar hunden?? (Just4Fun Records) (2013)
- Split 7" med Poison Idea (Just4Fun Records) (2015)
- Ryssen kommer (Just4Fun Records) (2015)
- Split-7" med The Bristles (Just4Fun Records/Civilisation Records/Pike Records/Heptown Records/RR) (2018)
- Bly, skrot&hagel (Phobia Records/Civilisation Records/RR) (2018)
- Starkare kaffe till Jul (Sockiplast Records) (2024)
