= Livin' Sacrifice =

Swedish punk band

- Origin: Hjulsta, Sweden
- Genres: Punk rock
- Years active: 1978–1982, 1995
- Labels: Rosa Honung

Livin' Sacrifice was one of the earliest all-girl punk bands in Sweden. The band started in a basement in Spånga in 1978. They soon got a reputation for being a good live band and was quickly signed to Rosa Honung. They reunited for a performance in 1995.

== Selected discography ==
- San (EP, 1981)
- Levande offer (LP, 1982)
- Fuck off (SP, 1982)
- Vägra för helvete (compilation LP, 1983)
- Motorhead Tribute (compilation CD, 1995)
- Kiss covered in Scandinavia (compilation CD, 1996)
- 1 (mini-CD, 1997)
- Svenska punkklassiker 78–81 (compilation CD, 2003)
