= Rosa Honung =

Swedish record company

- Founded: 1983 (registered as a company)
- Genre: punk rock
- Country of origin: Sweden

Rosa Honung is a record company started in the early 1980s and focused on punk rock. Rosa Honung existed as a cultural association in the 1970s before being registered as a company. They are notable both for their roster and their feud with Asta Kask where the record company trademarked their name. Rosa Honung also tried to become a publisher to rival STIM.

Rosa Honung published records with artists such as Asta Kask, Rolands Gosskör, Tredje Könet, Weaselface, Strebers, Livin' Sacrifice, The Bristles and Incest Brothers as well jazz musicians such as Jan Johansson and Lars Gullin. Rosa Honung have also released Feels like a woman with The Troggs. Rosa Honung is mostly known for the record by Asta Kask. Carola released her first records, then in the group Standby, on Rosa Honung, before breaking through with "Främling" in Melodifestivalen.

Mart Hällgren of De Lyckliga Kompisarna have written a song against Rosa Honung called Rosa Honungs grav.
