= UBBA =

- Also known as: UBBA·T, UBBA-Teens, For The Family
- Origin: Köping, Sweden
- Genres: Trallpunk, punk rock
- Years active: 1999-2003 (hiatus)
- Label: Birdnest
- Members: Total Egon (Mart Hällgren) - Lead Vocals, Bass; Puttra - Vocals, Lead Guitar; Viktor Lindström - Vocals, Second Guitar; Dadde (David Stark) - Vocals, Drums
- Past members: Marja - Vocals, Second Guitar
- Website: http://www.birdnest.se/sv/27_ubba

UBBA is a Swedish trallpunk band that was started on Easter 1999 in Köping. The band was founded by Mart Hällgren and David Stark.

Mart Hällgren (known as Total Egon) and David Stark (known as Dadde) used to play together in the band "Sunday Morning Einsteins". In autumn 1998, they left this band to start a trallpunk band instead. After searching for several months, Puttra and Marja were selected for the lead and second guitar in the spring of 1999.

During their first shows, the band was called "For The Family"; but the band soon changed its name to UBBA, meaning "Without B, Just A". They also used the names "UBBA·T", and "UBBA-Teens". The names are an obvious spoof of Swedish pop bands ABBA and ABBA-Teens (A-Teens) which they often parodied in several of their official photos. They released an EP called "1972" that same year.

By the end of 1999, the band had their first nationwide mini-tour with the band "Charta 77". In April 2000; they released their debut album "The U-Generation", their most known album to date; which is a complete parody of A-Teens' debut album The ABBA Generation. By the end of 2000, Viktor Lindström replaced Marja on the second guitar.

Although they never announced their official division, UBBA ceased to play actively around 2003. Mart Hällgren continued to play with his own band "Total Egon"; David Stark joined Wolfbrigade (left in 2012), "To What End?" and became a member of Asta Kask in 2004; Viktor Lindström continued in "The Pipelines", which later became "The Holiday Fun Club"; and Puttra retired from professional music, only playing punk and rock covers with friends.

== Discography ==
Extended Plays:

- 1999 - 1972 EP

Studio albums:

- 2000 - The U-Generation
- 2002 - Slag Under Bältet

Singles:

- 1972 - 1999
- UBBA*TEENS - 1999
- Separator - 1999
- Slag Under Bältet ("Battle Under The Belt") - 2002
