= KSMB (band) =

Background information
- Origin: Skärholmen suburb of Stockholm, Sweden
- Genre: Punk
- Years active: 1977–1982, 1993, 2015-
- Labels: MNW, Wild Kingdom

KSMB (Kurt-Sunes med Berit) was a Swedish punk rock band from 1977 to 1982. The band became associated with the slogan "KSMB = vrålrock", which they used to advertise their music in the subways of Stockholm. KSMB released two studio albums and a live album on the Swedish label MNW, before breaking up in 1982. KSMB has reunited and released three additional studio albums in 1993, 2017, and 2023. Their music was featured in the 2013 movie We Are the Best!.

== History ==
Johan Johansson, Mats Nilsson and Pekka Kangas began a band called "Ingenting" (Swedish for "nothing"). Their first and only gig was at Österholmsskolan in Skärholmen. In the autumn of 1977, most of the members of Ingenting went to Skärholmens Gymnasium, and discovered that if one worked with a project, like a band, one would not have to go to all of the classes. "Skärholmens Gymnasiums Punkensemble" was started; since many students did not want to go to class, the band quickly grew. After a chaotic gig in the aula in Skärholmens Gymnasium with 15 band members, of which 5 were singers, the project "Skärholmens Gymnasiums Punkensemble" was over. The singers Stephan "Steppan" Guiance and Michael Alonzo, drummer Johan Johansson, and bassist Matte Nilsson continued and became the only constant members of KSMB, as the band was renamed in 1978. KSMB is an acronym that stands for "Kurt-Sunes med Berit", a name taken from a sketch in the radio program Hemma hos.

In the spring of 1979, the Swedish label music label MNW offered KSMB a record contract, following a concert at the Musikverket in Stockholm. Their first studio recording was shared with the Incest Brothers and Travolta Kids, and was titled Bakverk 80.

KSMB released two full-length studio albums and three singles between 1980 and 1981 through MNW. Their first album being titled Aktion (Swedish for "Action") released 1980 had songs like "Tidens Tempo" and "En Slemmig Torsk". Shortly after in 1981 they released their most successful punk album Rika Barn Leka Bäst (English translation: "Rich Kids Play Best") that also includes their most popular song Sex Noll Två (English for "Six Zero Two"). During this period the band toured extensively in Sweden, including with the band Ebba Grön; KSMB was a best-selling band on the MNW label. However, the band was not profitable, and Johansson and Lars Jonson wanted to leave. KSMB played their last gig on May 27, 1982, at the Kamraspalatset at St. Eriksbron and then broke up.

In 1993, the band reunited at the instigation of bassist Mats Nilsson, who wanted to do a concert before he had an auditory nerve tumor irradiated. This reunion did not include Johan Johansson. Nilsson survived the radiation treatment, and the reunion resulted in further band activity. In 1994 they released the album En Gång Till... (English translation: "One More Time...") KSMB then continued to be active until 1996.

In 2015, the band reunited for a gig at the Bråvalla festival. This performance became a tribute to former band member Lars "Guld-Lars" Jonsson, who had died shortly before. The band members that participated in this performance were Janne Pettersson (keyboard), Tomas Gabrielsson (technician and producer), Emma Essinger (saxophone), Magnus Jonsson Szatek (trumpet), Janne Olsson (guitar, the replacement for Guld-Lars), Peter "Ampull" Sjölander (guitar), Rickard Donatello (bass), Johan Johansson (drums), Stephan "Steppan" Guiance (vocals), and Michael Alonzo (vocals).

In 2015, Steppan Guiance and Michael Alonzo, performed together as KSMB with The Hives at the charity gala Hela Sverige skramlar with the song Tänker på dig. In February 2017, KSMB released the album Ond Saga, which was also supported by a tour. In 2018, the band wrote and performed En slemmig torsk which explored the band's history; the corresponding album was released in 2019. In January 2020, KSMB released an EP titled Bland tomtar och troll. In 2023, they released a full studio album of cover songs Bröderna Bengtssons Hatt & Mössfabrik.

== Discography ==
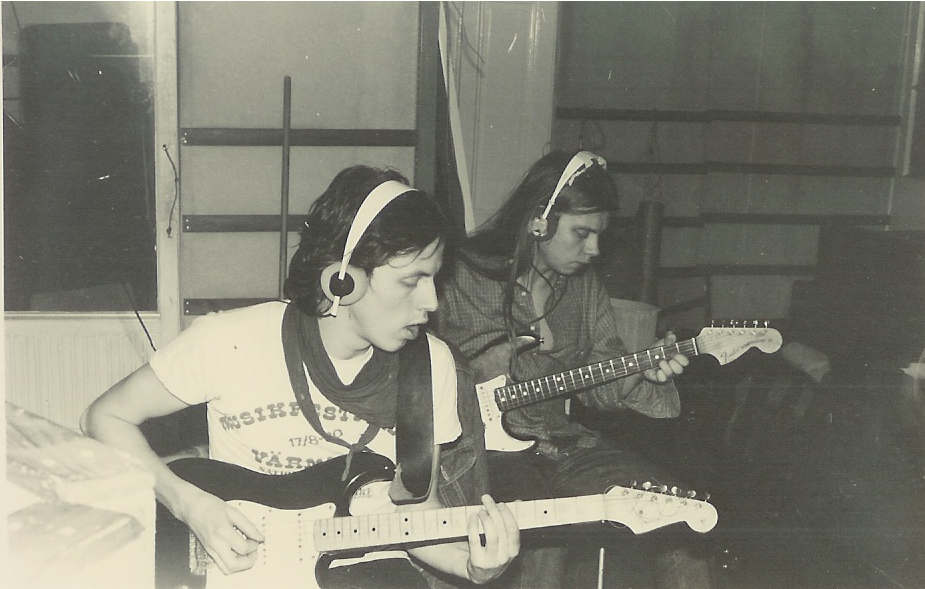
Peter "Ampull" Sjölander and Lars "Guld-Lars" Jonson in the studio in 1981.

=== Studio albums ===
1. 1980 - Aktion (Page on Swedish Wikipedia)
2. 1981 - Rika Barn Leka Bäst (Page on Swedish Wikipedia)
3. 1994 - En gång till
4. 2017 - Ond saga (Wild Kingdom)
5. 2023 – Bröderna Bengtssons hatt & mössfabrik (Wild Kingdom)

=== Live albums ===
- 1982 - Dé é För Mycké (Live) (Page on Swedish Wikipedia)
- 1989 - Sardjentpepper (Page on Swedish Wikipedia)
- 2019 - En Slemmig Torsk – Showen

=== Singles and EPs ===
- 1978 – Våga vägra (b-side: "-")
- 1980 – Tidens tempo (b-side: "Atomreggae")
- 1981 – Förord till livet (b-side: Tänker på dig)
- 1981 – Rövarnas visa (b-side: Polsk zchlager)
- 1981 – Schlagers nyårssingel (KSMB - Feliz Navidad / Gyllene Tider - Ingenting av vad du behöver)
- 1993 – Blickar av stål
- 1993 – Polisen grisen
- 2017 – Sverigevänner
- 2017 – Dom bränner bilar
- 2020 – Bland tomtar och troll (EP on Wild Kingdom)

=== Compilations ===
- 1979 - Bakverk 80 (Page on Swedish Wikipedia)
- 1979 – Musiknätet Waxholm 10 år: Med låten: "Torbjörns horor"
- 1981 – Schlagers sommarkassett: Med låten: "Oru basta"
- 2003 - Svenska Punk Klassiker (MNW)
- 2008 – MNW Klassiker: KSMB
