= Birdnest Records =

Swedish record label

- Founded: 1982
- Founder: Per Granberg
- Genre: Punk
- Country of origin: Sweden
- Location: Köping
- Official website: birdnest.se

Birdnest Records is a Swedish record company mainly dealing in punk music.

== History ==
It was founded by Per Granberg who also plays in Charta 77. The company was founded as a DIY company with the intention of only publishing Granberg's own records in 1982, under the name Birdskit. After a while Birnest also took on other bands, mostly in the trallpunk genre, and in 1988 they changed the name to Birdnest. When trallpunk became popular in the early 1990s the company grew. Notable bands are Dia Psalma and De lyckliga kompisarna.

During the same period several smaller record companies were distributed by Birdnest (among them Desperate Fight Records from Umeå). In the late 1990s the company suffered from restructurings at MNW who they had shared distribution with. Birdnest managed to straighten out the finances thanks to a support gala for the company. However the activity of the company has gone down and it now mostly publish records by Granberg's own bands and his friends. As a complement to the record company they also run Birdnest Mailorder that sells records online and at concerts.

On 12 September 2022 the studio with master tapes archive was destroyed in a fire.

=== Timeline ===
- 1983 - released the first EP with two lokal bands, Zynthslakt & the Past
- 1984 - released the first album with Charta 77
- 1987 - formed "Sinderella" together with other small Swedish labels, a sort of network for contacts and ideas regarding small labels.
- 1988 - changed the name from "Birdskit" into "Birdnest"
- 1989 - started up the mailorder.
- 1992 - started up the label Kamel.
- 1995 - adopted the two labels Desperate Fight Records and Ampersand and opened up the German and Norwegian offices..
- 1996 - started up the labels Strange Edge and Melon. Also made the movie "the Return of Jesús part II".

== Band signed to Birdnest ==
- Asta Kask
- Charta 77
- De Lyckliga Kompisarna
- Dia Psalma
- Finkel Rokkers
- Hydrogenium
- Him Kerosene
- Johan Johansson
- Mimikry
- Skumdum
- Slutstation Tjernobyl
- Strebers
- Stukas
- The Guineapigs
- Troublemakers
- UBBA

== Labels/Distribution ==
- Strange Edge
- Desperate Fight Records
- Ampersand Records
