= Toni Holgersson =

Swedish singer and songwriter

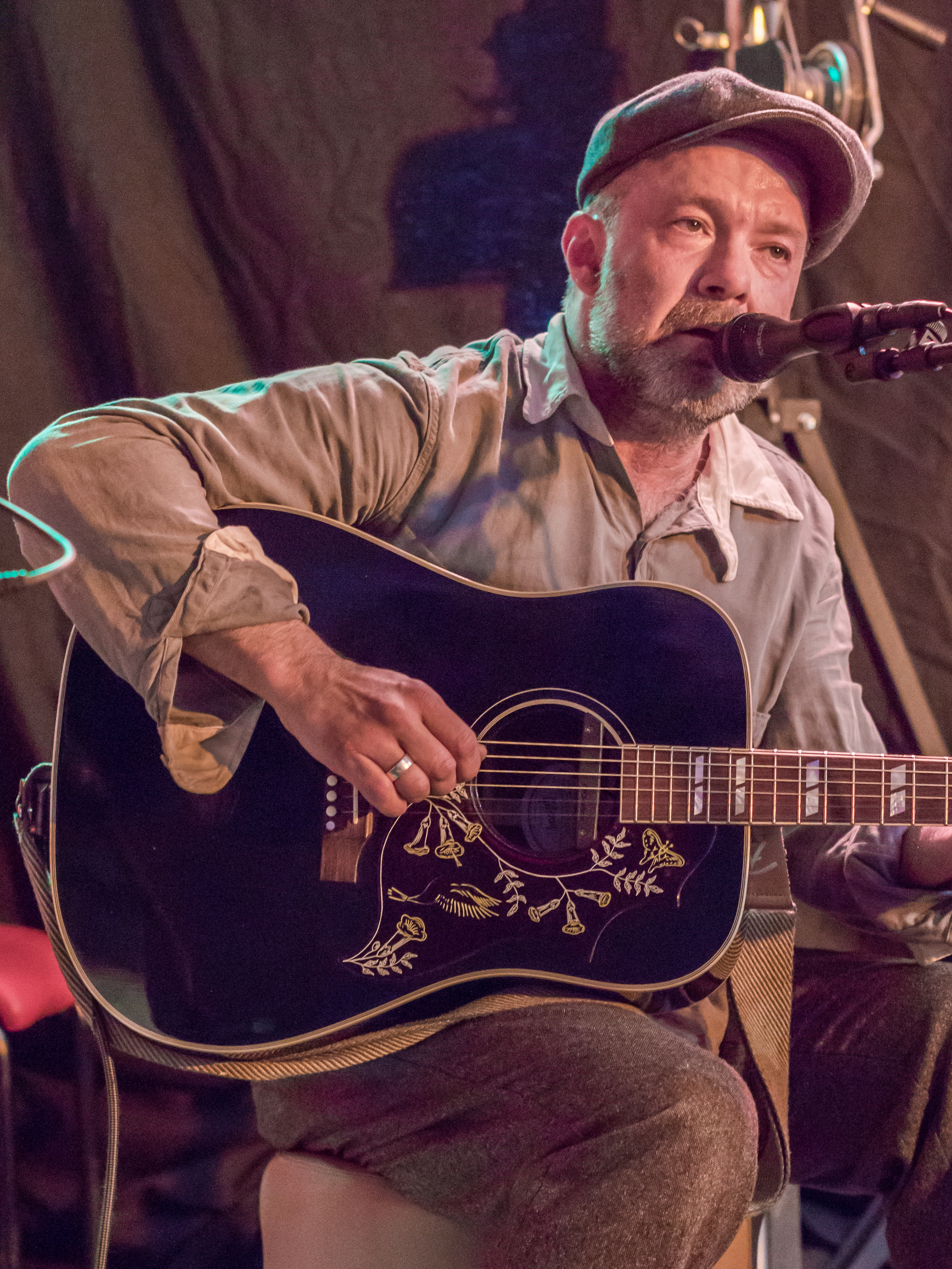
Toni Holgersson 2015

Toni Holgersson (born in Stockholm, Sweden on 29 January 1966) is a Swedish singer and songwriter.

Holgersson released full length self-titled CD Toni Holgersson in 1989 on MNW record label and was nominated for the Swedish Grammy for "Best Newcomer", followed by Louise & Kärleken in 1990 which in its turn was nominated for a Swedish Grammy for "best folk show" and Zigenaren i Månen in 1991, all on MNW. Then he started a collaboration with Kjell Andersson and EMI, starting with Blå Andetag in 1993, Lyckliga Slut in 1994. The same year, he toured with Lisa Ekdahl, Björn Afzelius and Mikael Wiehe with Visor. For a full decade after that, Holgersson was absent from the music scene due to drug abuse and homelessness.

In 2005, he returned with a very symbolic and appropriate title Tecken på liv (meaning Signs of Life) released on his original label MNW amidst great reception. In 2007 he released CD Psalmer (meaning hymns) on the Monitor label, in collaboration with Lasse Englund and Irma Schultz Keller. He was also involved in compilation albums like Taube, Sånger om barn, Dubbel Trubbel (EMI), Stolta stad, Retur Waxholm (MNW) and Med ögon känsliga för grönt (Transmedia).

On 19 May 2010, he released his eighth album "Ibland kallar jag det kärlek on Bonnier Amigo label, amidst critical reception and Grammy nomination for "Best Folk / Show" for a second time. The album was produced by his son Dante Kinnunen. Musicians that took part with him were Ludwig Dahlberg (drums), Andreas Söderström (guitar), Johan Berthling (bass), Martin Hederos (keyboards), Anna-Maria Espinosa and Markus Schulz (vocals). In June 2012, he released the album Sentimentalsjukhuset (Amigo) with the first single being "Blå Moln (Över Stockholm)" taken from the album.

In 2016, the last part of the trilogy "Nordic Noir" was recorded by Toni Holgersson and his son Dante Kinnunen, and released in autumn 2016. A single "Black Tambourine" from that album was released May 20, 2016. At "Nordic Noir", Dante and Toni worked with songwriter Charlie Engstrand Sommar who wrote the lyrics.

== Discography ==
=== Albums ===
Year	Album	Chart peak (SWE)	Certification
1989	Toni Holgersson	–	
1990	Louise och kärleken	22	
1991	Zigenaren i månen	28	
1992	Blå andetag	16	
1994	Lyckliga slut	16	
2005	Tecken på liv	16	
2007	Psalmer (with Irma Schultz Keller and Lasse Englund)	51	
2007	Ibland kallar jag det kärlek	16	
2012	Sentimentalsjukhuset	16	
2016	Nordic Noir	42	

Compilation album

- 2006: 90-94 Eftersänt (Samlingsskiva)

=== Singles ===
- 1989: Kom till mig
- 1991: "När du ser på mig"
- 1992: "Driven av en vind"
- 1992: "Bilder från Washington Sq."
- 1993: "Du med dina ögon"
- 1993: "Vad gör du nu?"
- 1994: "Nån att hålla om"
- 1994: "Vykort"
- 1994: "Nån att hålla om" (Remix)
- 2005: "Silverskugga"
- 2005: "Den jag en gång var" (reached #56 in Sverigetopplistan)
- 2012: "Blå Moln (Över Stockholm)"
