= 23 Till =

Swedish punk rock band

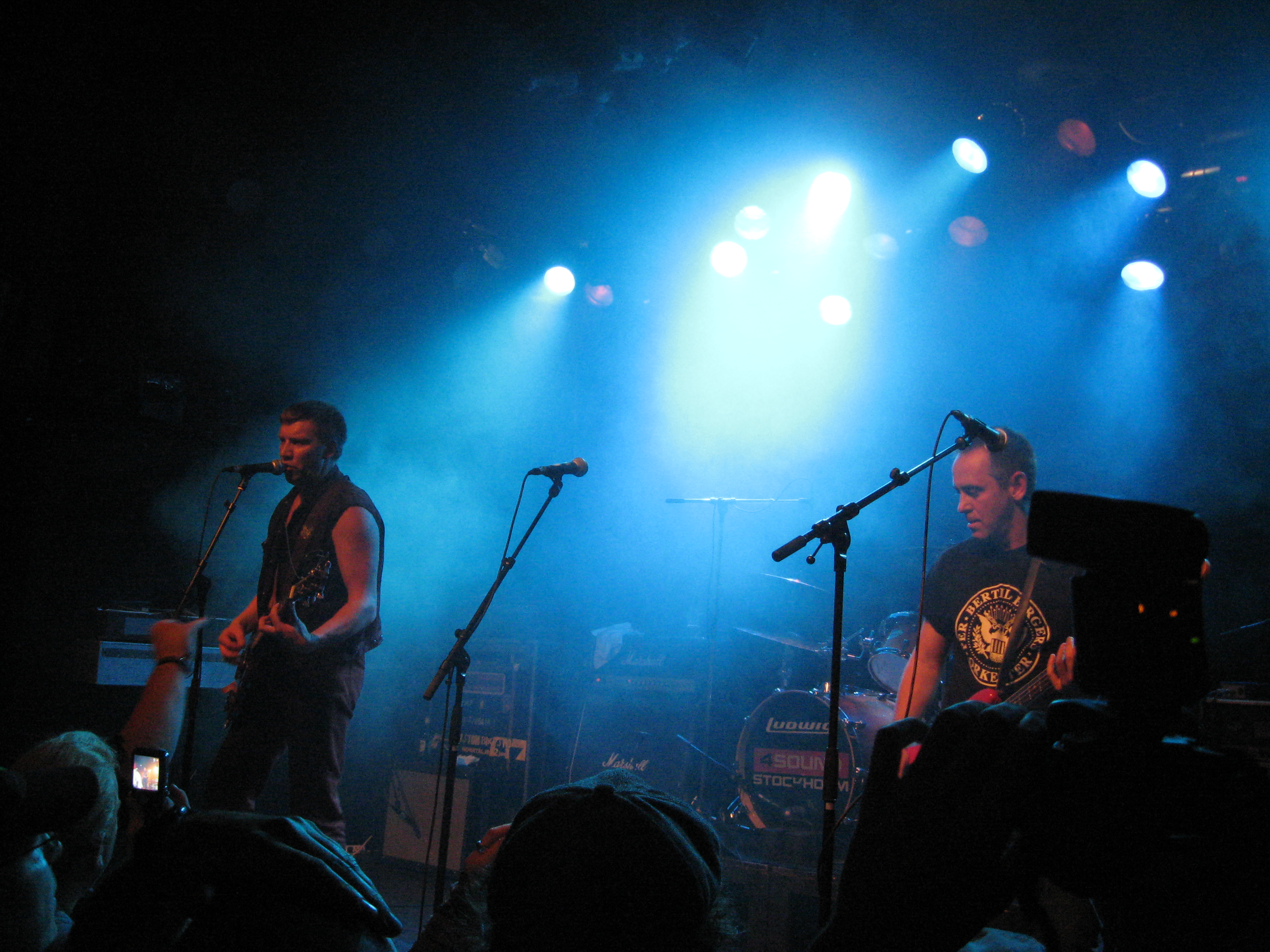
23Till playing at Beat Butcher's 25 year jubilee.

23Till was a Swedish punk rock band consisting of Janne Abrahamsson (vocals, guitar), Micke Pihlblad (bass, vocals) and Pär Andersson (drums). Formed in Norrköping in the middle of Sweden around 1985, they became one of the acts on the Swedish music underground scene in the 90s. Their last record was released 1995, and except a short reunion 1999 and 2000, 23Till is no longer active. The members have continued with other music projects.

23Till came with a wave of Swedish punk-related bands such as Ebba Grön and Dia Psalma, but 23Till was not as openly political as similar bands at the time.

== Discography ==
=== Albums ===
- Allt vad jag vill ha (1991)
- Nöjd? (1993)
- Skåpmat (compilation, 1994)
- Kryp (1995)
- Anabola Melodier (split with Coca Carola)

=== Singles ===
- Vitt Slem
- Lycklig (1989)
- Julsingel (with Dennis & De Blå Apelsinerna)
- Balladen Om Olsson (1993)
- För Den Goda Sakens Skull (1995)
