= Räserbajs =

Swedish punk rock band (formed 1990)

- Origin: Alingsås, Sweden
- Genres: Trallpunk; Punk rock
- Years active: 1990–1997
- Label: Kamel Records
- Members: Richard Stark; Erik Hjortstam; Martin Gustavsson; Tobias Wiik
- Past members: Joakim Levin; Joel Nadolski; Daniel Levin

Räserbajs was a Swedish punk rock band formed in 1990 in Alingsås by Richard Stark and Erik Hjortstam. They released many singles but only one album, Noppriga tights och moonboots from 1995. The band also appeared on numerous compilation albums. The lyrics were sometimes childish and dirty and sometimes political. They disbanded in 1997.

== Band members ==
- Richard Stark - lead vocals, guitar (1990–1997)
- Erik Hjortstam - bass, vocals (1990–1997)
- Martin Gustavsson - guitar, vocals (1991–1997)
- Tobias Wiik - drums, vocals (1995–1997)

=== Past members ===
- Joakim Levin - drums, vocals
- Joel Nadolski - drums
- Daniel Levin - guitar

== Discography ==
=== Album ===
- Noppriga tights och moonboots (1995)

=== Singles ===
- Drömmen om EG (1992)
- Hår på bröstet (1993)
- Fina flickor (1994)
- Jag legend (1995)

=== Demo ===
- Klass mot klass (1990)
