= MNW Music =

Swedish record label

MNW Music AB is a Swedish record company and was founded in 1969 in Vaxholm as Music Network Corps AB by Sverre Sundman, Lorne deWolfe and Lynn deWolfe. It is now located in Stockholm.

== History ==
After a financial crisis in the spring of 1971, the company was rescued by Tore Berger, from the group Gunder Hägg (later Blå Tåget), investing his own money and the company was transformed into Musiknätet Waxholm.

MNW was then one of the most important record companies in the music movement, focusing on Swedish musicians with Swedish texts, and political considerations often governed the publication. MNW Records Group was formed in 1993 when the company bought another record company called Amalthea. The right to release records was transferred to Push Music Group in 2004. The collaboration ended and Push Music changed its name to MNW Music.

In 2015, artist Johan Johansson (KSMB) won a lawsuit claiming that the MNW has put out music streaming services without a license.

== Artists ==
=== Current ===
- Blå Tåget
- Tore Berger
- Bosson
- Fläskkvartetten
- Toni Holgersson
- Masayah
- Roger Pontare
- Irma Schultz Keller
- Union Carbide Productions

=== Former ===
- Arbete Och Fritid
- Atacama
- Backyard Babies
- Björn Afzelius
- Contact
- Brända Barn
- Thomas Di Leva
- Ebba Grön
- Don Fardon
- Kim Fowley
- Hawkey Franzen
- Gläns Över Sjö Och Strand
- Gunder Hägg
- Hellacopters
- Hoola Bandoola Band
- Imperiet
- KSMB
- Musikens Vänner
- New Temperance Seven
- NJA-Gruppen
- Norrlåtar
- Peter LeMarc
- Pink Champagne
- Nationalteatern
- Scorpion
- Sheila Chandra (Indipop Records)
- Stefan Sundström
- Tant Strul
- Vildkaktus
- Wannadies
- Mikael Wiehe
- Wilmer X

== Sublabels ==
- No Fashion Records
