= Incest Brothers =

Swedish punk band

- Origin: Järfälla
- Genres: Punk
- Years active: 1977–1984, 2020-present
- Labels: Rosa Honung
- Members: Stefan "Mongo" Enger (bass and vocals), Johnny Essing (guitar), Hans-Peter "Happy" Törnblom (drums and vocals)

Incest Brothers was a Swedish punk rock band formed in August 1977 in the Stockholm suburb of Jakobsberg in Järfälla. Their music is political punk, and was influenced by British punk. The band was discussed in the 2013 movie We Are the Best!.

== History ==
The original Incest Brothers was formed an evening in August 1977, but the band was reformed in September 1978 with many new members. The band name was selected in the punk tradition of choosing a disgusting and obscene name. Together with KSMB and Travolta Kids the Incest Brothers contributed to the split album Bakverk 80.

Following the break-up of the Incest Brothers, Mongo and Happy founded the punk band Köttgrottorna. Johnny Essing played guitar in the bands bob hund and Bergman Rock.

=== Members ===
- Stefan "Mongo" Enger (bass and vocals)
- Happy Törnblom (drums and vocals)
- Johnny Essing (guitar)
- Sir N Andersson (guitar and vocals)
- Hazze Johannesson (vocals)
- Tomas Svensson (bass)
- Vortex (guitar)
- Sören Carlsson (drums)
- Pettersson (organ)

== Discography ==
=== Albums, EPs, and singles ===
- 1984 - Tre år försent (Rosa Honung Records)
- 2020 - Hotet Mot Vår Säkerhet (EP, Birdnest Records)
- 2022 - Ljuset Igen (single, Bollmora Rekords)

=== Compilations ===
- 1979 - Bakverk 80 (split with KSMB and Travolta Kids)
- 1986 - Ståkkålmsjävlar 1978-1981 (compilation from MNW)
- 1993 - Ny våg 78-82 (compilation from MNW)
- 1996 - Break the Rules, Volume 7 (compilation from Insekten Records)
- 2002 - Stockholmspunk 79-91 (compilation)
- 2003 - Svenska punkklassiker 78-81 (compilation from MNW)
- 2017 - Ståkkålm Syndrom 79
- 2019 - MNW50 (1969 - 2019) (compilation from MNW)
