= Dökött =

Swedish band

- Origin: Sweden
- Genre: Punk rock
- Members: Heavy (Jonas Stentäpp); Pekka (Peter Hindén); Ryttarn (Andreas Ryttare)

Dökött is a Swedish punk rock / skogsmetallband (metal) from Björbo, Dalarna. It is a trio made up of Jonas "Heavy" Stentäpp, Peter "Pekka" Hindén and Andreas "Ryttarn" Ryttare.

Dökött has released three albums and a compilation album (on CD and DVD) of a live performance from Rockstad. Their most famous songs are "Tuttar överallt" and "Leif".

== Heavy in Hjalle och Heavy ==
The band became very well known in the late 1990s, after Dökött's "Heavy" took part in the reality television show På rymmen with the title Hjalle och Heavy featuring Hans Hjalmar "Hjalle" Östman from band Mimikry and Jonas "Heavy" Stentäpp from bands Mimikry and Dökött was broadcast on Sweden's TV4 channel.

The series also resulted in three albums under the titles På rymmen (16 tracks), Dunder (15 tracks) and 2a säsongen (14 tracks). På rymmen sold 73,000 copies and stayed at the top of the Swedish albums chart for four weeks.

== Discography ==
=== Albums ===
- 1998: Dökött [Star Clear Records]
- 2000: Amazing grejs[Home Fair Records]
- 2009: Årets album [HGM, High Gear Music)
- 2016: Stålis

Compilation / live albums

Year	Album	Peak Position	Certification
Year	Album	SWE	Certification
2012	Best of Dökött 1998–2012: Live från Rockstad falun	31	
