= Köttgrottorna =

Swedish punk band

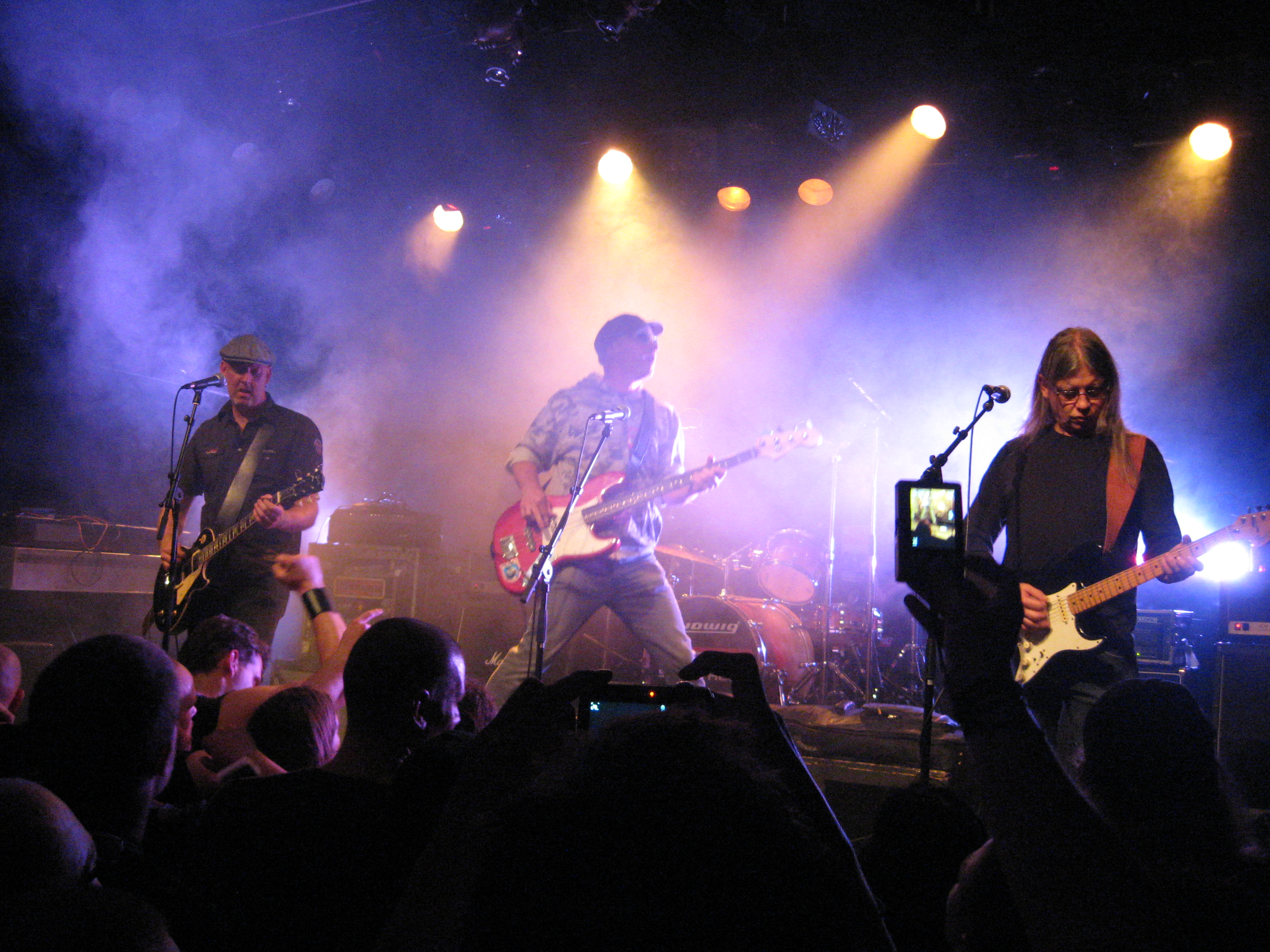
- Köttgrottorna playing at Beat Butcher's 25-year jubilee.

Background information
- Also known as: The Ornitologs
- Origin: Järfälla, Sweden
- Genres: Punk rock
- Years active: 1983–present
- Label: Beat Butchers
- Members: Stefan "Mongo" Enger; Hans-Peter "Happy" Törnblom; Janne Olsson
- Past members: Thomas "Valen" Wahlström; Jörgen Ohlsson; Lars "Guld-Lars" Jonsson
- Website: kottgrottorna.se

Köttgrottorna is a Swedish band formed in 1983 in the Stockholm suburb of Järfälla by Hans-Peter "Happy" Törnblom and Stefan "Mongo" Enger, who played together in the Swedish punk band the Incest Brothers, along with guitarist Thomas "Valen" Wahlström. Their music can be classified as punk or rock. Köttgrottorna have produced ten studio albums, eight of which were released on the label Beat Butchers; this label is known for releasing albums in the trallpunk genre, including from Asta Kask.

== Discography ==
=== Studio albums ===
1. 1986 – Blodsdans
2. 1987 – Halvdöd
3. 1991 – Hungrig (Beat Butchers)
4. 1993 – Sex, politik & fåglar (Beat Butchers)
5. 1994 – Sanningens morgon (Beat Butchers)
6. 1997 – Tinnitus (Beat Butchers)
7. 1999 – Soft Metal (Beat Butchers)
8. 2013 – Totalgalet (Beat Butchers)
9. 2017 – Robin Hood (Beat Butchers)
10. 2023 – XL (Beat Butchers)

=== Live albums ===
1. 2003 – På Fyrtiofyran
2. 2009 – Live på Torsgatan 1

=== Singles and EPs ===
1. 1984 – Mus som mus (EP)
2. 2005 – Vi snor om vi vill (EP)
3. 2006 – Drängen (video)

=== Compilations ===
1. 1993 – Köttrea 1983–93
2. 2005 – Far åt helvete (2CD)

== Fun facts ==
- Backyard Babies have opened up for Köttgrottorna

== Band members ==
- Stefan "Mongo" Enger – bass and vocals
- Hans-Peter "Happy" Törnblom – drums
- Janne Olsson – guitar and backing vocals

=== Former band members ===
- Thomas "Valen" Wahlström – vocals and guitar 1983–84
- Jörgen Ohlsson – vocals & guitar 1984–1987
- Lars "Guld-Lars" Jonsson – guitar (deceased 2015)
