= De Lyckliga Kompisarna =

Swedish melodious punk band

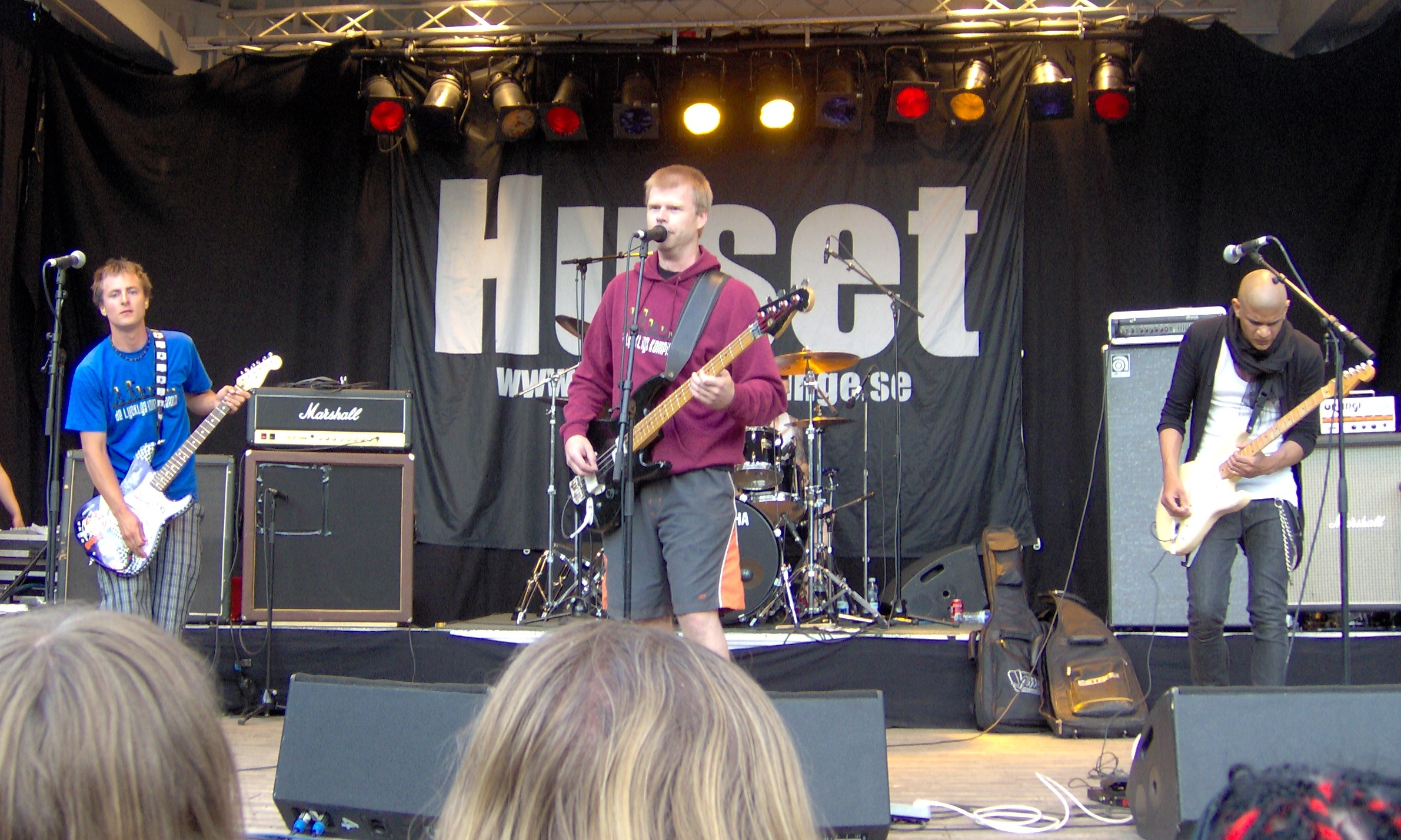
- De Lyckliga Kompisarna live at Huset i Parken in Huddinge, June 7, 2008.

Background information
- Origin: Stockholm, Sweden
- Genres: Punk, trallpunk
- Years active: 1989–1997; 2008
- Label: Birdnest
- Members: Mart Hällgren; Jouni Haapala; Simon Dahlberg; Roger Reinstam
- Past members: Daniel Levin; Björn Gunér; Egil Jansson; Fredrik Åberg; Christoffer Roth; Sussie Persson; Joakim Levin
- Website: delyckligakompisarna.se

De Lyckliga Kompisarna (Swedish for ’The Happy Friends’), DLK, is a Swedish melodious punk band. The band was formed in 1989, split up in 1997, and re-united in 2008. They are probably best known for their song "Ishockeyfrisyr", which is also known as "Hockeyfrilla" (Swedish for "mullet"). They also made a music video for it.

The band is headed by Mart Hällgren who both wrote songs, sang and played several instruments. DLK split up after two farewell gigs at Kafé 44 in Stockholm, Sweden. These gigs were recorded and compiled into a live album. After DLK, Martin Hällgren began a solo career as "Mart" (he had previously played solo in the band Total Egon), but later started the band UBBA.

De Lyckliga Kompisarna stated in January 2008 that they would begin playing again, and the band has since gone on tour and released a new EP.

== Members ==
- Mart Hällgren (vocals and bass)
- Jouni Haapala (drums)
- Simon Dahlberg (guitar and backup vocals)
- Roger Reinstam (guitar and backup vocals)

=== Former members ===
- Daniel Levin
- Joakim Levin
- Sussie Persson
- Björn Gunér
- Egil Jansson
- Christoffer Roth
- Daniel Peda
- Anders Fransson
- Mattias Ander
- Fredrik Åberg

== Discography ==
=== Album ===
- 1991 – Le som en fotomodell
- 1993 – Tomat
- 1995 – Sagoland
- 1996 – DLK
- 1997 – Live på Kafé 44 (Live)
- 2000 – Hockeyfrillor 89-97 (Samling)
- 2009 – Hugos Sång (EP)
- 2010 - Hugos Sång LP
- 2013 - De Motvilliga Konstnärerna
- 2016 - Bara Tiden Är Ny
- 2021 - Pengar Har Inga Ögon

=== Single ===
- 1990 – "Scaniajon"
- 1990 – "Dit kuken pekar"
- 1994 – "Dammsugarförsäljare Blues"
- 1994 – "8"
- 1995 – "Tillbaka till sagolandet"
- 1996 – "Borlänge"
