= Mimikry =

Swedish punk rock band

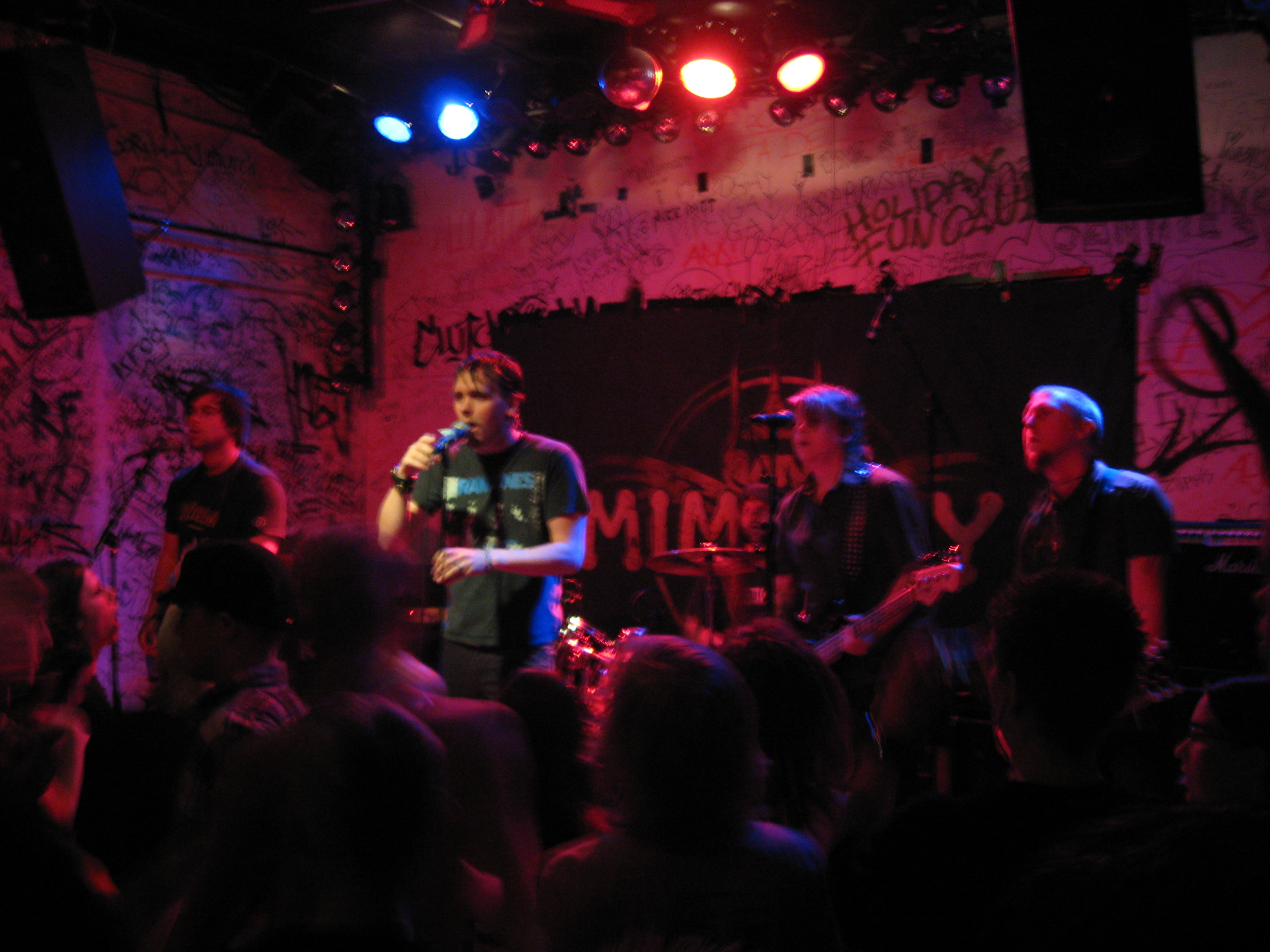
- Mimikry plays at Kafé 44, 2008

Background information
- Origin: Stockholm, Sweden
- Genre: Punk rock
- Years active: 1993–present
- Members: Hjalmar "Hjalle" Östman; Johan Åsberg; Mia Mästerbo; Anders "Apan" Andersson
- Past members: Jonas Nyberg; Anders Brandström; Jonas "Heavy" Stentapp
- Website: www.alderland.se

Mimikry is a Swedish punk rock band established by singer Hjalmar "Hjalle" Östman and drummer Jonas "Heavy" Stentäpp both coming from the Gagnef region west of Sweden. Besides Mimikry with its 8 albums to date, Hjalle and Heavy had an important duo project and had three further albums in their name Hjalle och Heavy, after huge popularity through the television series På rymmen. Heavy was also involved in metal band Dökött.

== History ==
=== Hjalle och Heavy (1998) ===
Hjalle och Heavy
- Origin: Gagnef, Sweden
- Genre: Punk rock
- Years active: 1998
- Past members: Hjalle (Hjalmar Östman); Heavy (Jonas Stentäpp)

The two principal members Hjalle (Hjalmar Östman, born 1976 in Floda, Gagnef Municipality) and Heavy (Jonas Stentäpp, born 1975 in Björbo, Gagnef Municipality) met each other very early on when they both competed in På rymmen (a Swedish version of Wanted) on TV4, which had an average of 1.7 million viewers.

Forming the duo Hjalle och Heavy, the band released three albums in 1998. The first was På rymmen, which reached the top of the charts for 4 weeks with 80,000 copies sold. The 16-track album included a mix of songs produced as Hjalle och Heavy, Mimikry, and Dökött (Stentäpp's metal band trio). The follow-up album 2:a säsongen sold 120,000 copies and also reached the top of the charts.

They embarked on a national tour of Sweden accompanied by their bands Mimikry and Dökött (Heavy's Björbo metal band with Peter "Pekka" Hindén and Andreas "Ryttarn" Ryttare). The third album in 1998 was Dunder, which sold 40,000 copies and was based on the tour. After the third album, subsequent efforts by the duo were focused on Mimikry.

=== Career as Mimikry ===
The band Mimikry formed in 1993 released its debut album Automatiskt after the huge success and popularity of Hjalle och Heavy. Mimikry has released 9 albums to date.

Current members

- Hjalmar "Hjalle" Östman – lead vocals (1993–present)
- Johan Åsberg – guitar (1993–present)
- Mia Mästerbo – bass, backing vocals (1997–present)
- Anders "Apan" Andersson – guitar, backing vocals (2005–2010, 2023-present)

Former members

- Jonas Nyberg – bass (1993-1997)
- Anders Brandström – guitar, backing vocals (2011–2023)
- Jonas "Heavy" Stentäpp – drums (1993–2026; his death)

Jonas "Heavy" Stentäpp died from lung cancer on 15 October 2026, at the age of 50.

== Discography ==
=== As Hjalle och Heavy ===
Year	Album	Peak positions
Year	Album	SWE
1998	På rymmen	1
1998	2:a säsongen	1
1998	Dunder	22

=== As Mimikry ===
Year	Album	Peak positions
Year	Album	SWE
2000	Automatiskt	
2002	Visar vägen	
2004	Kryptonit	
2005	Uppsamlingsheatet	
2008	Alderland	27
2010	Mimifierat	–
2012	Monster	23
2014	Tjugo	13
2016	Alla sover	25
2018	Grit	7
2021	Splitter	13

==== EPs ====
- 2011: Jag blöder lika mycket som du

==== DVDs ====
- 2006: Scream for me Finnåker / Lika bra som Iron Maiden
- 2007: Bullrigt, hembränt och live!

==== Singles / Videography ====
(Selective)

- 2000: "500 mil"
- 2004: "En flicka som är stark"
- 2006: "Kom och dansa lite"
- 2008: "Alderland"
- 2008: "Min sång"
- 2010: "Borgarsvin"
- 2014: "Röda Fanor"
