= Radioaktiva räker =

Swedish band

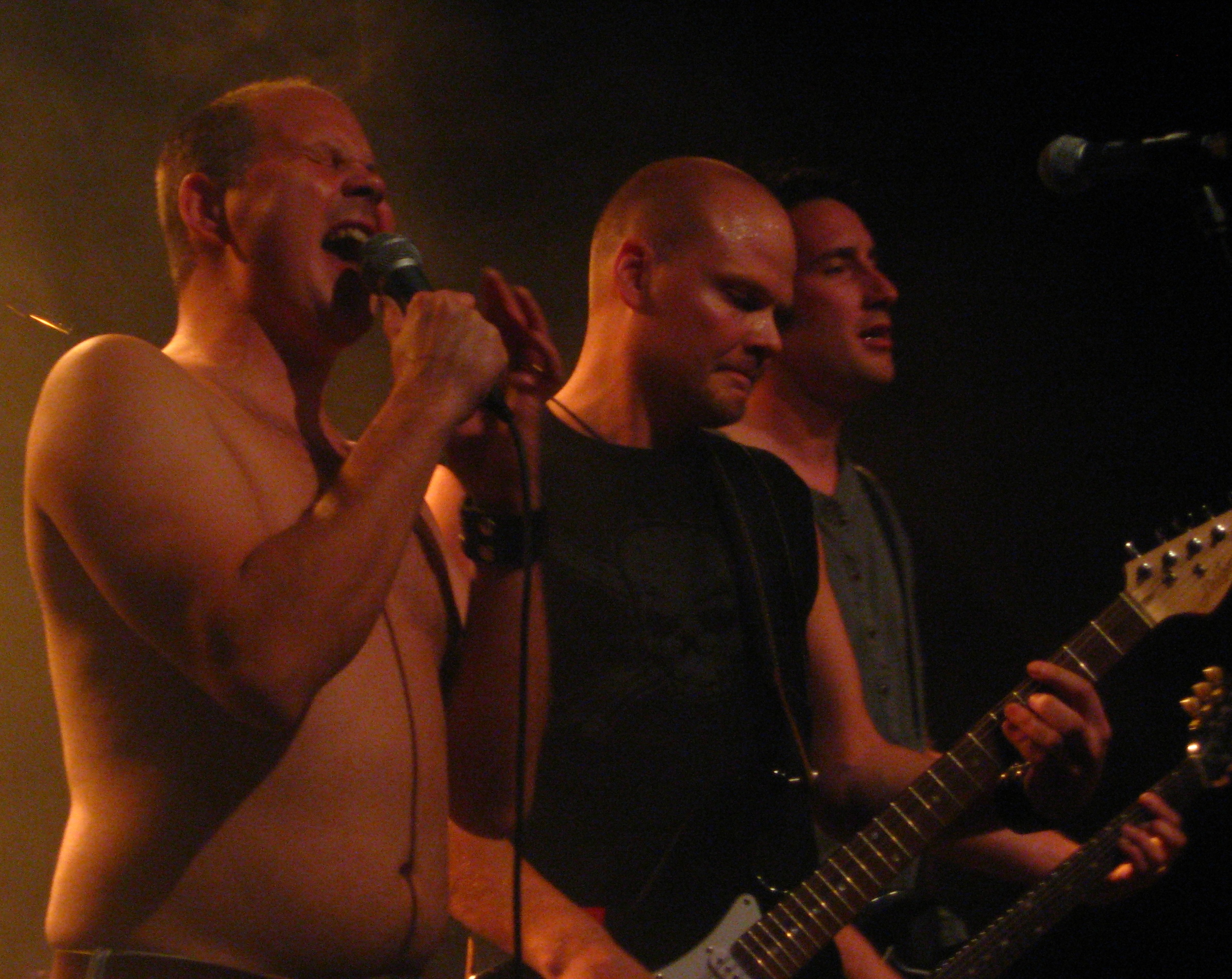
- Radioaktiva räker 2009.

Background information
- Origin: Hofors, Sweden
- Genres: Trallpunk
- Years active: 1991–2003 (Reunions: 2009, 2011)
- Labels: Beat Butchers, Rosa Honung
- Members: Johan Anttila; Jonas Lund; Mattias Johansson; Jimmy Petterson
- Past members: Daniel Torro; Jimmy Lindqvist
- Website: radioaktivaraker.com

Radioaktiva räker (Swedish: Radioactive shrimps) was a Swedish trallpunk band, formed in Hofors in 1991. The first line up was Johan Anttila, Daniel Torro, Jonas Lund and Mattias Johansson. In the summer of 1992 they were signed to the record label Beat Butchers. During the 1990s Radiaktive räker was one of the biggest punk bands in Sweden. Daniel Torro was later replaced by Jimmy Petterson. Radioaktiva räker split up 2003 after releasing an album called Finito and playing a summer tour.

The band reunited on September 25, 2009, for an evening with the celebration of the Beat Butchers 25 year anniversary. This occurred on Södra Teatern in Stockholm together with a number of other punk bands that have collaborated with Beat Butchers.

== Members ==
- Johan Anttila - vocals, guitar
- Jimmy Petersson - guitar, vocals
- Mattias "Dåglas" Johansson - bass guitar
- Jonas Lund - drums

=== Former members ===
- Daniel Torro - vocals, guitar
- Jimmy Lindqvist - bass guitar

== Discography ==
- Verkligheten (1993)
- Bakom spegeln (1994)
- Labyrint (1994)
- ....Res dig upp (1996)
- Döda mej inte så dödar jag inte dej (1998)

=== Compilation albums ===
- Tro inte allt (1998)
- Finito (2003)
