= Snorting Maradonas =

Swedish punk band

Snorting Maradonas is a punk band from Borås and Ulricehamn, Sweden. The band has performed at Motståndsfestivalen, but really made national fame with a song mentioning king Carl XVI Gustaf and his family. In 2006 the band released their EP Klasskamrater on Sekerhetspersonaal Records.

== Members ==
- Erik Sjöstrand – song and electric mandolin
- Robin Ahlqvist – bass
- Robert Olsson – guitar
- Ragnar Bern – drums

=== Former members ===
- Harry Chichon – guitar
- Pelle Andersson – bass
- John Kvarnström – guitar
- David Börjesson – drums

== Discography ==
- Betongsbröder (2004)
- Lärobok (2005)
- Klasskamrater (2006)
