= Charta 77 (band) =

Swedish punk rock band

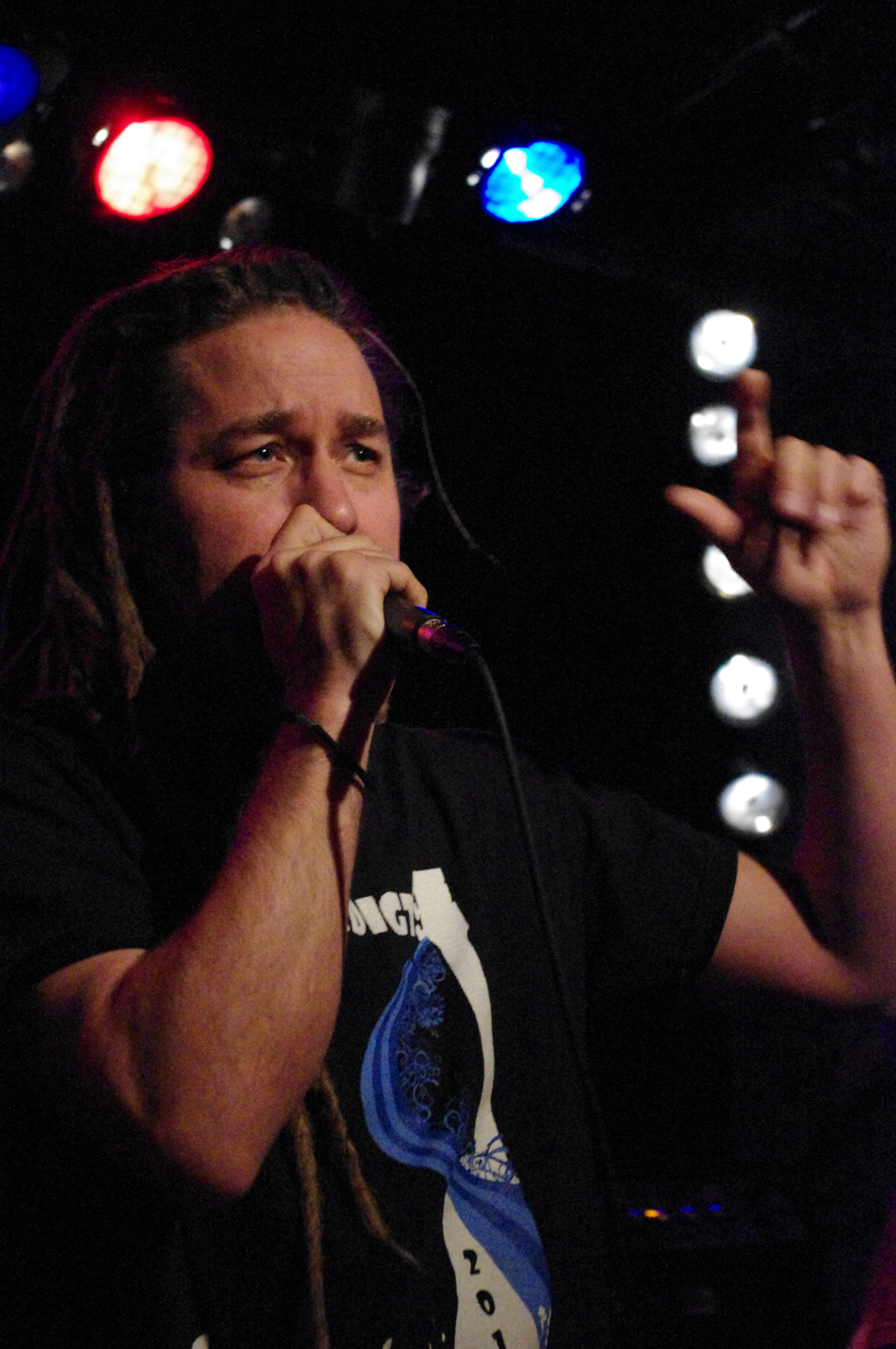
- Charta 77 performing in 2010

Background information
- Origin: Köping, Sweden
- Genres: Punk rock; pop rock
- Years active: 1983–present
- Labels: Birdnest
- Members: Per Granberg; Janne Olsson; Stefan Enger; Tommie Fagerberg
- Past members: Johnny Smedberg; Martin Nordberg; Micke Bergman; Leif Ekring; Gustaf Hielm; Teijo Granberg; Fredrik Wikman; Johan Hultman; Mattias Söderlund; Erik Ullvin

Charta 77 (named after Charter 77) is a Swedish punk rock band formed in 1983 in Köping. It consists of Per Granberg (vocals, guitar), Janne Olsson (guitar), Stefan Enger (bass), and Tommie Fagerberg (drums).

== Band members ==
Current

- Per Granberg – vocals, guitar (1983–present); bass (1983–1994)
- Janne Olsson – guitar, backing vocals (2015–present)
- Stefan "Mongo" Enger – bass, backing vocals (2017–present)
- Tommie Fagerberg – drums (2022–present)

Past

- Martin Nordberg – drums (1983–1987)
- Johnny Smedberg – guitar (1983–2015)
- Micke Bergman – vocals, guitar (1985–1986)
- Leif Ekring – drums (1987–1994)
- Gustaf Hielm – bass (1994–1995)
- Teijo Granberg – drums (1994–2003; 2011–2021)
- Fredrik Wikman – bass (1996–1999)
- Mattias Söderlund – bass (1999–2017)
- Johan Hultman – drums (2003-2011)
- Erik Ullvin – keyboards, backing vocals (2017–2022)

== Discography ==
Studio albums

- Välfärdens Avfall (1984)
- Sista Dansen (1985)
- Split (with Peace in Paris) (1987)
- White Face (1988)
- Institution, Justice & Poverty (1989)
- The Beauty Is in the Beholder's Eyes (1991)
- Hobbydiktatorn (1992)
- Grisfesten (1993)
- Tecken i Tiden (1995)
- N Annorlunda (1996)
- Svart på vitt (1998)
- Sagan Om Världens Mest Hypade Band (2000)
- G8 (2002)
- Spegelapan (2004)
- SALT (2015)
- Trodde Vi Skulle Ändra Världen... (2016)
- Inget Varar För Evigt, Så Har Det Alltid Varit (2017)
- SKULD (2020)
- VERDAN-DI (2020)
- URD (2022)
- Den Sista Måltiden (2024)

EPs

- Out It's Still Dark (1986)
- Lilla Björn Och lilla Tiger (1995)
- Before the Rain (1997)
- När Köttet Är Slut (1998)
- Före Grisfesten (1993)
- Reser Sig Och Bara Går (2003)
- Tid-övertid (2024)

Compilations

- Kröp, Gick & Skrek 83–85 (1991)
- Skrek Ännu Högre 85–87 (1993)
- BLY (1994)
- 83–98 (box set, 1998)
- Singlar 85–98 (2CD, 1998)
- I Drömmarnas Land 83–03 (2003)
- Läs Mellan Raderna 83–13 (2013)

Live albums

- HEL! (1994)
- Svett – Live in Trondheim (2016)
