= Dia Psalma =

Swedish band

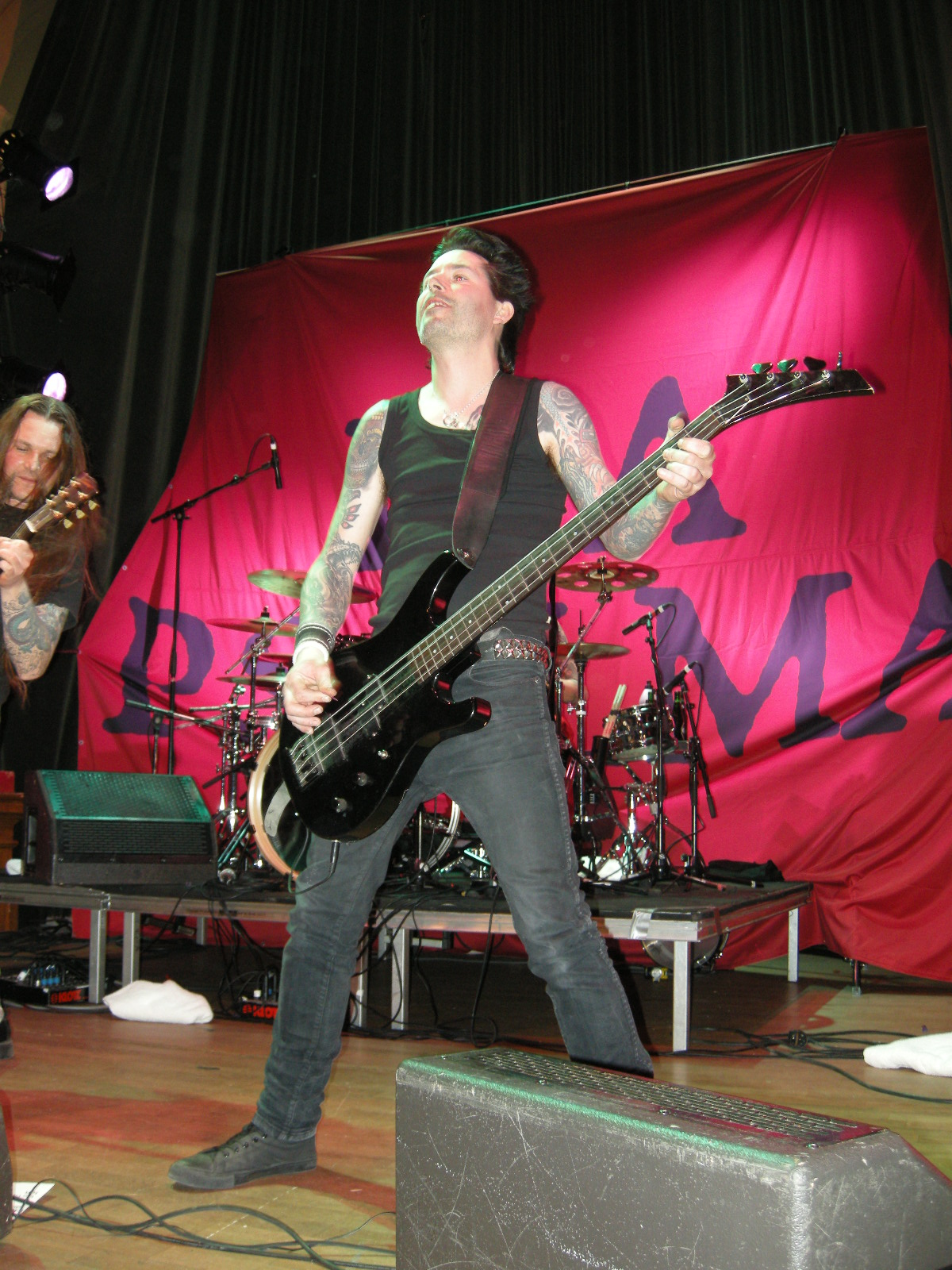
- Dia Psalma (Ulke och Ztikkan) at Nalen, Stockholm

Background information
- Origin: Strängnäs, Sweden
- Genres: Folk rock, punk rock, alternative rock, heavy metal
- Years active: 1992 - 1996, 2007 - 2011
- Label: Birdnest Records
- Spinoff of: Strebers
- Members: Micke "Ulke" Johansson, Fredrik "Ztikkan" Blomberg, Stefan "Stipen" Carlsson, Pontus Andersson
- Website: Dia Psalma's homepage at the Wayback Machine (archived August 31, 2013)

Dia Psalma was a self-described punk/folk rock/metal fusion band, from Strängnäs, Sweden. It was formed by former members of Strebers that started in 1985 (and played as Sixguns for a while).

Dia Psalma was formed shortly after Johnny, drummer and main lyrics writer in Strebers was killed in a car crash. After his death in 1992 Ulke (guitar and vocals) and Ztikkan (bass) recorded a final Strebers album called Till En Vän (To A Friend) with Solbjörn (a drum machine). The same year the band went on tour with Stipen as drummer after Solbjörn (according to legend) got a new job as a jazz musician in the USA. After the tour they decided to create the band Dia Psalma. Before disappearing in 1997 they released three albums and seven singles.

On January 17, 2006, it was stated that Dia Psalma would be reunited. They released a compilation CD, with all their earlier songs on, called "Psamlade Psalmer" ((p)Collected Hymns). In the fall of 2007 they released a new studio album called "Djupa Skogen" (Deep Forest), and a tour of Sweden followed. In late December, 2007, the band announced that they had started to write songs for a new album. In March 2011 the band wrote on their webpage that they would dissolve the band at the end of the year after another tour of Sweden where they played Gryningstid live in its entirety a final time. Despite this the band made another appearance, playing just a few songs, at the 30 year celebration of their label Birdnest Records in May 2012.

== Discography ==
=== Studio albums ===
List of albums, with details and chart positions
Title	Album details	Peak chart positions
Title	Album details	SWE
Gryningstid	Released 1994	8
Efter Allt	Released 1995	7
Djupa Skogen	Released 2007	13
Re Voltere	Released 2009	21

=== Singles ===
List of albums, with details and chart positions
Title	Year	Peak chart positions
Title	Year	SWE
"Hon får..."	1993	19
"Stora Bollar av eld"	1994	–
"Tro rätt, tro fel"	1994	18
"Balladen om lilla Elsa"	1994	5
"Noll"	1994	17
"Hundra kilo kärlek"	1995	4
"Luft"	1995	52
"Som man är"	2007	15
"—" indicates the single didn't chart or was not released in that chart's country.

=== Compilation albums ===
- Sell Out (1996)
- Psamlade Psalmer ("(P)collected Hymns") (2006)
