= Asta Kask =

Swedish punk band

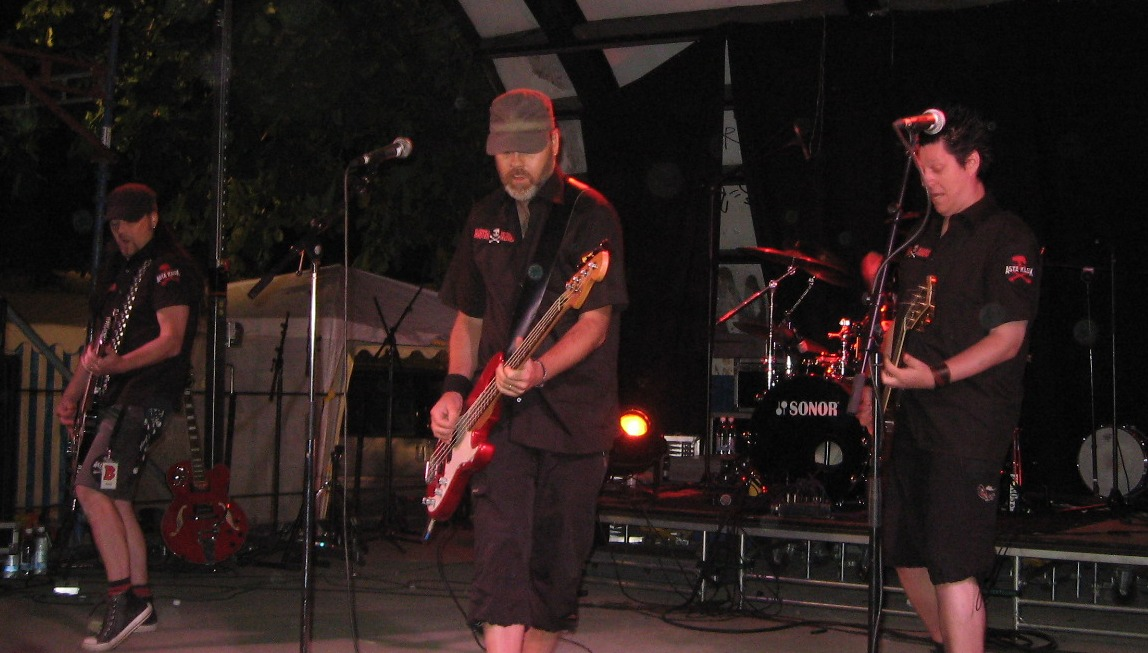
- Asta Kask playing at Pretzeltown festival in Södertälje.2009

Background information
- Also known as: X-tas
- Origin: Töreboda, Sweden
- Genres: Punk, Trallpunk
- Years active: 1978–1989, 1992, 2003–present
- Labels: Rosa Honung, Burning Heart Records, Kloakens Alternativa Anti Produktion
- Members: Bonni "Bonta" Pontén; Micke Blomqvist; Magnus "Ernie" Hörnell; David "Dadde" Stark
- Past members: Magnus "Bjurre" Bjurén; Ulf Karlsson; Per Karlsson; Stefan Hovbjer; Steve Aktiv
- Website: Official website

Asta Kask is a Swedish punk band from Töreboda, Sweden, founded in 1978. Asta Kask plays melodic punk music with Swedish lyrics; they are a foundational band for the musical subgenre known as trallpunk.

The band have gained international reputation and their songs have been covered by acts from three continents. German punk rock band Rasta Knast started as a tribute band to Asta Kask.

== History ==
The band was founded in 1978 by Micke Blomqvist, Pelle Karlsson, Uffe Karlsson, and Stefan Svensson as "X-tas". In 1980, they changed the band name to Asta Kask; the name comes from a 19th century ancestor of Micke Blomqvist. In 1981 the band recorded their first EP För kung och fosterland and then broke up.

At the end of 1982, Micke re-founded the band, along with Bonni "Bonta" Pontén as second guitar player and singer, Magnus "Ernie" Hörnell on bass, and Magnus "Bjurre" Bjurén as drummer. Between 1983 and 1984, Asta Kask released 3 more EPs. In 1983 the band started working with Rosa Honung Records. The band did not want to put out a full studio album, but released "Aldrig en LP" (English translation: "Never an LP") in 1986; they then split up. Band members pursued other projects including: Micke joined the Strebers, and Bjurre and Bonni founded the band Cosa Nostra.

In 1989 the band had a reunion and played a few gigs. They released a live split EP with Rolands Gosskör, titled Sista dansen. In 1993 they released a second live CD Från andra sidan.

The 1990s saw the re-release of Asta Kasks's earlier records on CD. In 1992, they played at Rosa Honung's tenth anniversary. In 2000, Höhnie Records in Germany released a best-of compilation album, as well as an EP with unreleased material.

In 2003, Asta Kask began touring again, and in 2004 played at the Punk-im-Pott Festival in Germany; Phill Hill of Rasta Knast replaced Bjurre for this performance. The drummer, Bjurre, quit the band in late 2004 and was replaced by Dadde (of Wolfbrigade). During 2005, a growing conflict with Rosa Honung reached a point where the band instead signed a deal with Burning Heart Records.

In April 2006, Asta Kask recorded their first album in 20 years, titled En För Alla Ingen För Nån. This album peaked at number 44 on the Swedish music charts. They also released the DVD "Dom får aldrig mig", which includes a history of the band, 16 live tracks, and a bonus cd with 17 re-recordings of older songs.

In 2013, the album Handen På Hjärtat was released on their new record label; this album peaked at number 33 on the Swedish music charts.

== Members ==
- Micke Blomqvist - vocals and guitar
- Magnus "Ernie" Hörnell - bass
- David "Dadde" Stark - drums (since 2004)
- Bonni "Bonta" Pontén - vocals and guitar
- Magnus "Bjurre" Bjurén - drums (1982–1986, 2003–2005)

== Discography ==
=== Studio albums ===
1. 1985 - Med is i magen (re-released on cd 1991, Rosa Honung Records)
2. 1986 - Aldrig en LP (re-released on cd 1991, Rosa Honung Records)
3. 2006 - En för alla ingen för nån (Burning Heart Records)
4. 2013 - Handen på hjärtat (Kloakens Alternativa Antiproduktion)

=== Live Albums ===
1. 1986 - Live
2. 1990 - Sista dansen (Live LP, re-released on cd 1995)
3. 1993 - Från andra sidan

=== Compilations ===
1. 2000 - Rock Mot Svinen (Höhnie Records)
2. 2003 - Kravallsymfonier 78-86 (Birdnest Records)
3. 2006 - Välkommen Hem - Samlade EP's (Burning Heart Records)
4. 2016 - Upphittat! 2003-2016 (Kloakens Alternativa AntiProduktion)

=== EPs ===
1. 1981 - För kung och fosterland
2. 1983 - En tyst minut
3. 1984 - Plikten framför allt
4. 1986 - Än finns det hopp
5. 2000 - Till sista droppen
6. 2006 - Precis som far / Lilla Frida

=== DvDs ===
- 2006 - Dom Får Aldrig Mig - En Film Om Asta Kask Och Punken
