= Kafé 44 =

Swedish café, concert venue, and anarchist bookstore

Coordinates: 59°18′57.43″N 18°04′58.07″E

- "44an"
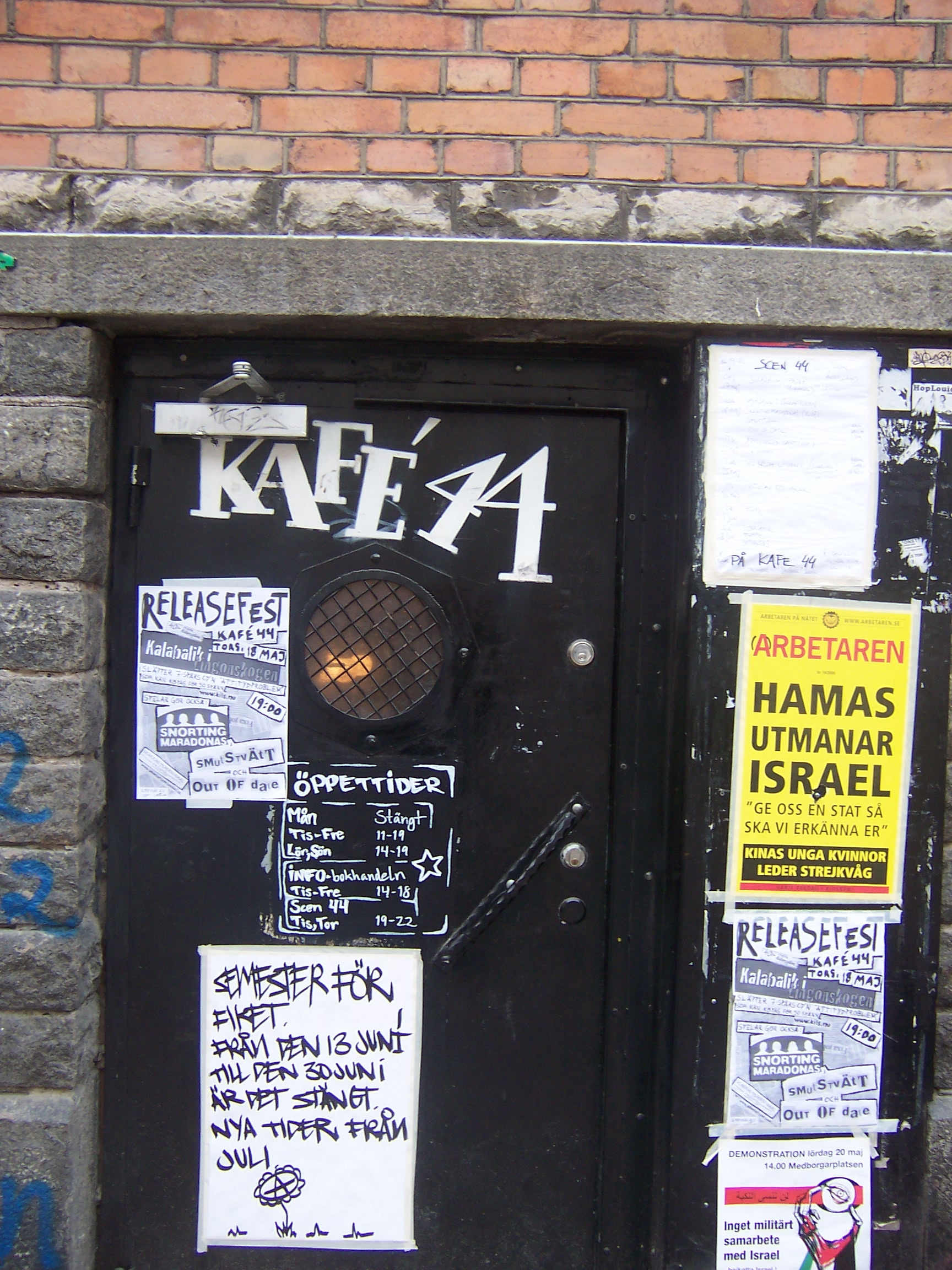
- Entrance to Kafé 44
- Interactive map of Kafé 44
- Location: Tjärhovsgatan 46, Stockholm

Construction
- Opened: early 1980s

Website
- kafe44.org

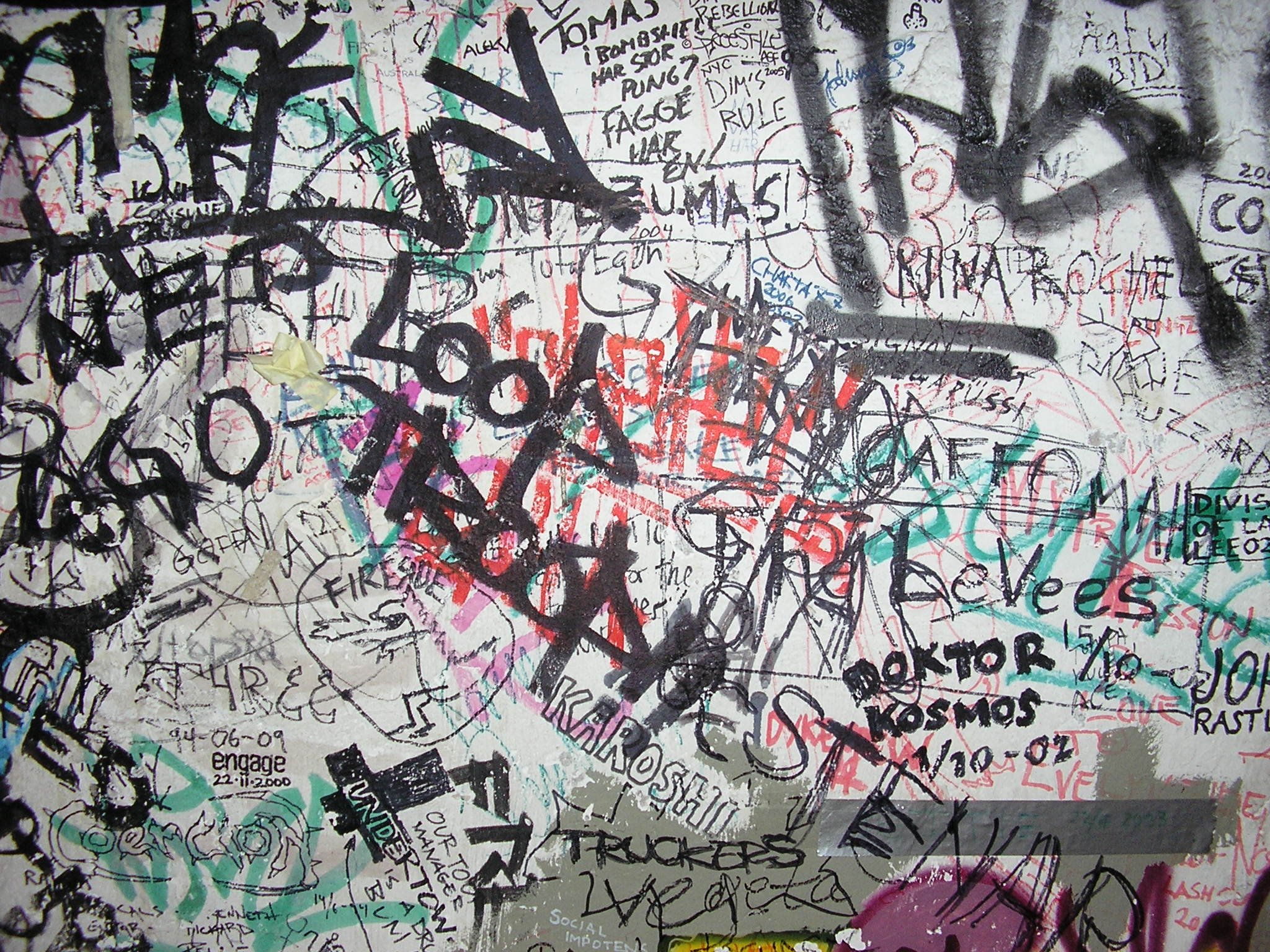
Signatures of bands who have played at Kafé 44

Kafé 44 is a café, concert venue, and anarchist bookstore in Stockholm. Based in the Kapsylen work cooperative, which was founded by an artist group in 1976, the café Dagfiket opened in its basement in the early 1980s, and was later followed by the music venue Scen 44 in 1990, and the anarchist bookstore Bokhandeln INFO a few years later. Kafé 44 continues to run in the present day, although usually closed during the summer months. They host a variety of events ranging from punk shows to lectures and more.
