= Strebers =

Swedish punk band

- Origin: Strängnäs, Sweden
- Genre: Punk
- Years active: 1985–1992, 2000–2001
- Label: Rosa Honung
- Members: Mikael "Ulke" Johansson - guitar & vocals Fredrik "Ztikkan" Blomberg - bass Stefan "Stipen" Carlsson - drums
- Past members: Pelle Pettersson - bass Johnny Rydh - drums Micke Blomqvist - guitar

Strebers was one of the most influential punk bands from Sweden, formed in Strängnäs in 1985.

Songs were conceived by drummer Johnny Rydh, who whistled melodies to guitarist Mikael "Ulke" Johansson. Johansson then in turn translated the harmonies to electric guitar. His distinctive guitar sound played a major role in Strebers' songs, which were a mix of punk rock and Swedish folk music, while Rydh wrote most of the lyrics.

== Rydh's death ==
Following Rydh's death in a car crash in 1992, the remaining members disbanded Strebers, as they felt they could not continue under the old name without Rydh. Johansson and bassist Blomberg then formed Dia Psalma together with new drummer Stipen, formerly of Merciless.

== Reunion ==
Strebers reunited in 2000 for a gig at punk club Smedjan in Köping. This gig was followed by a longer tour in 2001, which was documented on the live album Meningslöst liv(e). The title of the album is a play on one of the band's early songs, Meningslöst liv (Swedish for Meaningless life).

== Discography ==
- Ur led är... (1986)
- Öga för öga (1987)
- I fädrens spår (1990)
- Kaos & skrål 85-87 (1991)
- Kallt stål, varmt blod (1991)
- Till en vän (1992)
- Blod, svett & tårar (2000)
- Meningslöst liv(e) (2001)
