= Skebokvarnsv. 209 =

Studio album by Thåström
- Released: 16 November 2005
- Genre: Rock
- Length: 49:16
- Language: Swedish
- Label: Sonet, Universal
- Producer: Niklas Hellberg

Thåström chronology
Mannen som blev en gris (2002)	Skebokvarnsv. 209 (2005)	Kärlek är för dom (2009)

Skebokvarnsv. 209 is the fourth solo album of Swedish rock musician Joakim Thåström. It was released on 16 November 2005, by Sonet and Universal.

Skebokvarnsvägen is a street in the Stockholm suburb Högdalen, and the address Skebokvarnsvägen 209 is the house where Thåström grew up in. Niklas Hellberg produced the entire record except "619 Kilometer", which was produced by Joakim Thåström and Per Hägglund. The album was also released on LP. The song "The Haters" is about Thåström's old punk band Ebba Grön, which was called The Haters from the beginning.

== Critical reception ==
"Fanfanfan", the record's fourth track, became Thåström's first number one single. "Om Black Jim", about the author Dan Andersson, and "Sönder Boulevard" were also released as singles, and reached second and twelfth on the chart respectively.

The album topped the chart in Sweden, and won a Grammis in the category "Year's rock album (solo)". In June 2013, Sonic Magazine rated it as the 50th best Swedish album ever.

The Luxembourgish music act Rome covered "Fanfanfan" on the 2016 album The Hyperion Machine.

== Track listing ==
No.	Title	Writer(s)	Length
1.	"Brev till 10:e våningen"	Joakim Thåström, Per Hägglund	5:01
2.	"Söndagmåndagsång"	Thåström, Hägglund	4:14
3.	"Ingen sjunger blues som Jeffrey Lee Pierce"	Thåström	4:42
4.	"Fanfanfan"	Thåström	4:25
5.	"Främling överallt"	Thåström	6:16
6.	"The Haters"	Thåström	3:43
7.	"Sønder Boulevard"	Thåström	4:33
8.	"När muren föll"	Thåström, Hägglund	4:18
9.	"Stjärna som är din"	Thåström	3:59
10.	"619 Kilometer"	Thåström, Hägglund	4:03
11.	"Om Black Jim"	Thåström, Hägglund	4:02

== Personnel ==
- Joakim Thåström – lead vocals, guitar, piano, harmonica, fx
- Niklas Hellberg – piano, marimba, organ, slide guitar, wurlitzer, bass guitar
- Ulf Ivarsson – bass guitar
- Norpan Eriksson – drums
- Conny Nimmersjö – guitar
- Pelle Ossler – guitar, banjo

== Charts ==
Chart performance for Skebokvarnsv. 209
Chart (2005)	Peak position
Swedish Albums (Sverigetopplistan)	1
