= Joakim Thåström =

Thåström (Joakim Thåström)
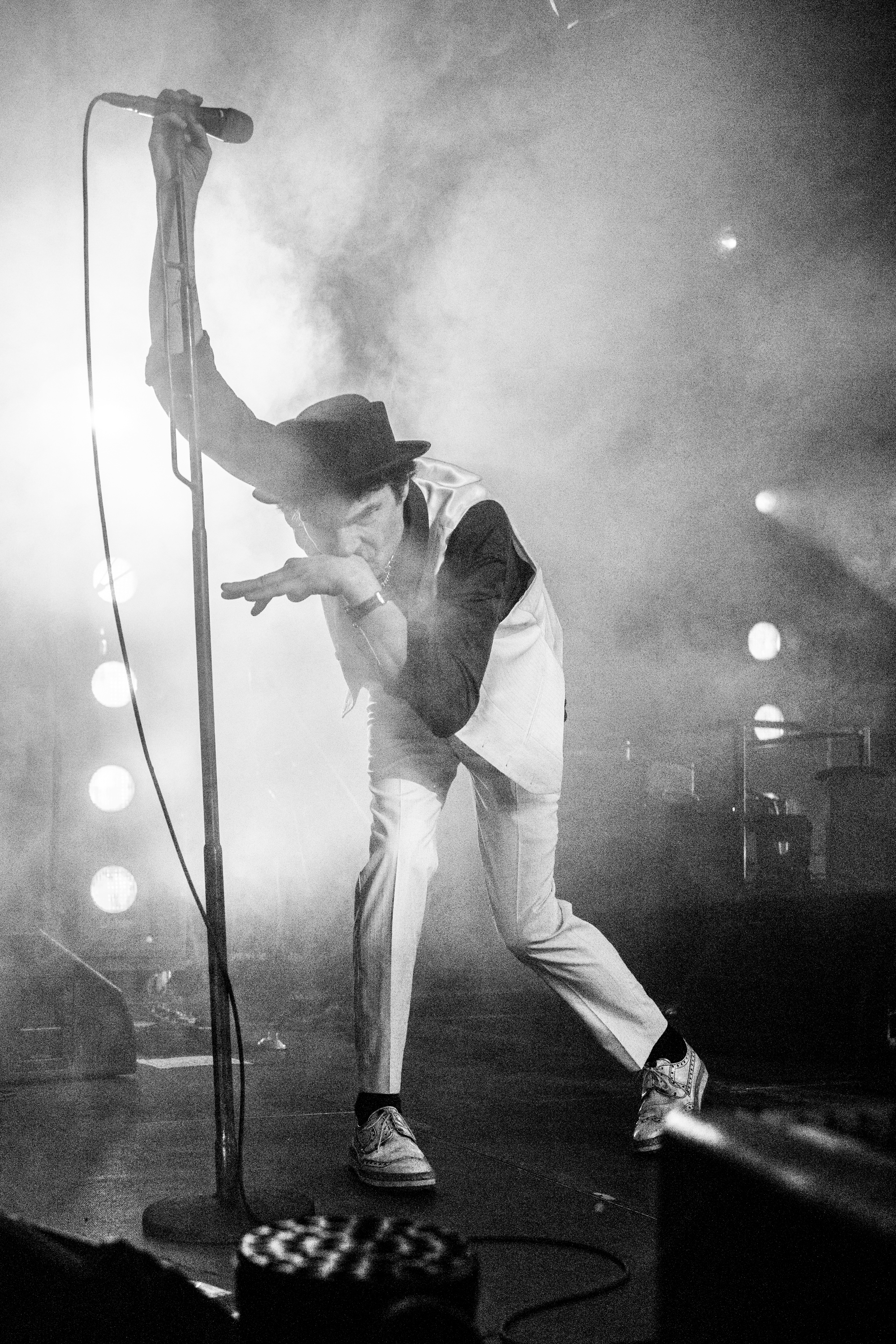
- Thåström live in 2015

Background information
- Also known as: Pimme
- Born: Sven Joachim Eriksson Thåström; 20 March 1957 (age 69)
- Origin: Sweden
- Genres: Punk rock, hard rock, industrial
- Occupation: Musician
- Instruments: Vocals, guitar, keyboards
- Years active: 1977–present
- Member of: Sällskapet
- Formerly of: Ebba Grön, Imperiet, Peace Love & Pitbulls
- Website: thastrom.se

Sven Joakim Eriksson Thåström (born 20 March 1957), better known as Thåström, is a Swedish singer and songwriter, mostly known for the bands Ebba Grön and Imperiet. He has moved between a number of genres, from punk to rock, industrial and autobiographical singer-songwriter music.

== Life and career ==
=== Early career and Ebba Grön ===
Thåström grew up on Skebokvarnsvägen in Högdalen, south of Stockholm. He formed his first band "Helt sonika" with Thomas Svanljung, Lars Elffors, Lennart "Elton" Hellgren, Bosse Steinholtz and Lars Bremer. The band played around Stockholm in youth centers, clubs and outdoor festivals. Lennart Eriksson (or Fjodor as he was known) lived in Rågsved. Together with Gunnar "Gurra" Ljungstedt, they formed a band first called The Haters. The Haters changed their name after only three days to Ebba Grön, which originates from a police code in connection with the so-called Operation Leo, where the German terrorist Norbert Kröcher planned to kidnap the Swedish Minister for Immigration Anna-Greta Leijon. "Ebba röd" was the police code of the operation to arrest Kröcher. When the arrest was accomplished the police called out "Ebba grön" on the radio. Thåström was the singer and guitarist of punk band Ebba Grön from 1977 to 1983.

=== 1982–1989: Rymdimperiet and Imperiet ===
When Ebba Grön went in hiatus in 1981 due to bassist Lennart "Fjodor" Eriksson having to serve time in jail for refusing military service, the three remaining members (Thåström, drummer Gunnar "Gurra" Ljungstedt and keyboardist Anders "Stry Terrarie" Sjöblom) formed side-project Rymdimperiet (Galactic Empire).

When Ebba Grön officially disbanded in 1983, Rymdimperiet was renamed Imperiet (The Empire). With a then-modern sound firmly set in the 80s and a more focused leftist political stance combined with easily accessible songs, Imperiet became one of the biggest Swedish bands of the 1980s.

In an attempt to cross over to international audiences, Imperiet also recorded an album with some of their songs translated to English.

=== 1989–1997: First solo releases and Peace Love & Pitbulls ===
In 1989 Thåström started a solo career as a rock singer-songwriter with progg influences. He began his solo career with the release of two solo albums, the self-titled 'Thåström' in 1989 and then "Xplodera mig 2000" (Xplode Me 2000) in 1991. The later was extremely computer-based and led to the development of the band Peace Love & Pitbulls.

In 1992, he started the heavy industrial rock band Peace Love & Pitbulls, with lyrics in English. The band existed until 1997 and released three studio albums.

=== 1999–2005: Focus on solo career ===
When Thåström in 1999 released the album Det är ni som e dom konstiga, det är jag som e normal (You're the Strange Ones, I am the One Who's Normal), it became successful. Featuring Swedish lyrics and less computerized music, Thåström returned to a rock and roll style.

In 2002 Thåström released the album Mannen som blev en gris (The Man Who Became a Pig) which was a dark and 'filthy' album with a lot of dusty sounds.

In late 2005 Thåström released the album Skebokvarnsv. 209 (Skebokvarn Street 209). The title refers to Thåström's childhood home address. The album is the most biographical album Thåström has ever released. It contains several songs with extremely personal lyrics and the music is mostly based on acoustic guitars.

=== 2007–present: Sällskapet and recent work ===
In 2007, Thåström presented a new band called Sällskapet. The band had been kept a secret since 2003 and was revealed together with their self-titled debut album. Sällskapet is commonly seen upon as a one time thing and in 2008 Thåström announced that he's working on a new solo album and that he is going to share two shows with the Swedish band Kent, play at the Peace & Love-festival in Borlänge and also play at the Beatday-festival in Copenhagen in the beginning of August.

On 13 March 2009 he released a new album called Kärlek är för dom (Love is for them [or those]).

On 15 February 2012 his seventh album was released, Beväpna dig med vingar (Arm yourself with wings), and he went on tour in Sweden supporting this release. A large portion of the proceeds from the merchandise sold on this tour was donated to the cause of the homeless people in Sweden. In November that year, Thåström released his first live-DVD: "Som jordgubbarna smakade...".

Thåström released Den Morronen (That Morning) 2015.

In 2017, he released his ninth album Centralmassivet (The Massif Central).

In 2021 he released his tenth album entitled Dom som skiner (Those who beam).

== Back-up band ==
Current members

- Christian Kjellvander – guitar, backing vocals
- Niklas Hellberg – keyboards, organ
- Ulf Rockis Ivarsson – bass guitar
- Mikael Nilzen – keyboards
- Nikolas Janco – drums

Former members

- Tomas Hallonsten – keyboards
- Anders Hernestam – drums
- Conny Nimmersjö – guitar
- Chips Kiesbye – guitar, backing vocals
- Jörgen Wall – drums
- Heikki Kiviaho – bass
- Per Hägglund – keyboards

== Discography ==
=== Studio albums ===
- Thåström (1989)
- Xplodera mig 2000 (1991)
- Singoalla (1998)
- Det är ni som e dom konstiga, det är jag som e normal (1999)
- Mannen som blev en gris (2002)
- Skebokvarnsv. 209 (2005)
- Kärlek är for dom (2009)
- Beväpna dig med vingar (2012)
- Den morronen (2015)
- Centralmassivet (2017)
- Dom som skiner (2021)
- Somliga av oss (2024)

=== Live albums ===
- Thåström på Röda sten (2003)
- Som jordgubbarna smakade... (2012)

=== Compilation albums ===
- Solo Vol 1 (2006)
- Be-bop-a-lula hela jävla dan (2009)

=== With other bands ===
Ebba Grön

- We're Only In It For The Drugs (1979)
- Kärlek & Uppror (1981)
- Ebba Grön (1982)

Rymdimperiet

- Alltid Attack (1981)
- Vad Pojkar Vill Ha (1981)
- Felrättsnettheltfelrättsnett (1982)

Imperiet

- Rasera (1983)
- Blå himlen blues (1985)
- 2:a Augusti`85 (1985)
- Synd (1986)
- Imperiet (1988)
- Tiggarens tal (1988)
- Live/Studio (1988)
- Kickar (1990)
- Greatest hits (1995)
- Klassiker (2007)

Peace, Love and Pitbulls

- Peace, Love and Pitbulls (1992)
- Red sonic underwear (1994)
- 3 (1997)
- War in my livingroom 92–97 (2007)

Sällskapet

- Sällskapet (2007)

Other work

- Fiendens musik – Mer eller mindre (1979)
- Micke Hagström & Cosmic Cowboys – Price you pay (1981)
- Micke Hagström & Cosmic Cowboys – Gangster (1982)
- Pink Champagne – Vakra Pojke (1982)
- Zetterberg & Co – Zetterberg & Co (1982)
- Tant Strul – Amazon (1983)
- Stig Vig & Dom 40 röjarna – Presenterar Kapten Sörensen (1984)
- Per Cussion Everybodys Talking (1986)
- Lolita Pop – Bang your Head (1987)
- Eldkvarn – Karusellkvällar (1989)
- Fleshquartett – Flow (1993)
- Just D – Sug på den/Tre amigos (1996)
- Pugh Rogefeldt – Vår kommunala man/Marathon (1999)
- Superia – Permission (2000)
- Ossler – Dålig mage, öronsus och törst (2001)
- Magnus Carlson – Va med mej, Nu skiner solen/Allt är bara du, du, du (2001)
- Bob Hansson – Mobile world, Europa/ Kör solen kör (2005)
- Kajsa Grytt – Bara vi står ut/ Brott och straff (2006)
- Regina Lund – Förlåt! Nej, jag menar aj. (2006)
- Fleshquartet – T.K.K/Voices of eden (2007)
- Ossler – Ett Brus (2008)
- Garmarna – "Öppet hav" from the album 6 (2016)
