= Var e vargen =

1986 single by Imperiet

Single by Imperiet
- B-side: "Det Är Inget Under"
- Released: 1985
- Genre: post-punk
- Length: 4:15
- Label: Mistlur
- Songwriter: Imperiet
- Producers: Imperiet, Stefan Glaumann

Var e vargen (also stylized: Var é vargen, colloquial spelling of Swedish: Var är vargen, “Where's the wolf”) is a Swedish post-punk song by Swedish rock band Imperiet, released as a single in 1986.

== History ==
The song was already recorded in 1985 under the name Den vilda världen (“The wild world”). Covers for both 7" and 12" singles were pressed but as the band were not satisfied with the final mix, the release was canceled and the covers were destroyed.

The first release of the song on record was instead the English translation “The Wild World”, albeit with different lyrics to the Swedish version, which was released as the B-side of the vinyl single Peace on April 2, 1986. It was not until May 7 that the Swedish original was finally launched, now under the new title Var e vargen (“Where's the wolf”).

The song is one of the most widely released songs in Imperiet's history; no less than seven different versions exist on disc, three of which are the English version The Wild World.

After the breakup of Imperiet in 1988, Joakim Thåström during his solo career and during the period with Peace, Love & Pitbulls performed Var e vargen on several tours.

== Interpretation ==
One interpretation of the text is that it refers to the return of the wolf in Scandinavia, as the grey wolf had previously gone extinct in Scandinavia in the early 20th century, but later re-established itself when Finnish and Russian wolves migrated into Sweden and Norway during the late 1970s and then got puppies in the early 1980s.

== Lyrics ==
Original:	Translation:
Refrain: [×3] Var e vargen Var e vargen Var e vargen – – du trodde var död	Refrain: [×3] Where's the wolf Where's the wolf Where's the wolf – – you thought were dead
Verse 1: När månen om natten sätts i brand – – av ett isande skrik ifrån norr, är det sant Det de viskar om en rit nånstans – – så välsignat vare vårt land	Verse 1: When the moon at night is set ablaze – – by an icy cry, from the north, it is true That which they whisper about, a rite somewhere – – so blessed be our land
Refrain: [×2] Var e vargen Var e vargen Var e vargen – – du trodde var död	Refrain: [×2] Where's the wolf Where's the wolf Where's the wolf – – you thought were dead
Verse 2: I de djupaste skogar från fjällen i skyn – – hörs berättas en urgammal myt Om blixtrande ögon du aldrig kan fly – – så bevare vår stad och by	Verse 2: In the deepest forests from the mountains in the sky – – an ancient myth is being told About flashing eyes you can never escape – – so beware, our town and village
Refrain: [×2] Var e vargen Var e vargen Var e vargen – – du trodde var död	Refrain: [×2] Where's the wolf Where's the wolf Where's the wolf – – you thought were dead
Pre-chorus: [×2] Den vilda världens hunger – – lämnar aldrig dig	Pre-chorus: [×2] The hunger of the wild world – – never leaves you
Verse 3: Som en levande lavin kommer hungriga djur – – över vidden hörs deras tjut Och vinden sjunger ett mollstämt du – – människa, är du för eller mot till slut?	Verse 3: Like a living avalanche, come hungry animals – – across the expanse, their howls are heard And the wind sings a minor tune you – – human, are you for or against in the end?
Refrain: [×4] Det e vargen Det e vargen Det e vargen – – du trodde var död [×3/4] – du hört [×1/4]	Refrain: [×4] It's the wolf It's the wolf It's the wolf – – you thought were dead [×3/4] – you've heard [×1/4]
Pre-chorus: [×8] Den vilda världens hunger – – lämnar aldrig dig	Pre-chorus: [×8] The hunger of the wild world – – never leaves you

== Releases ==
- 1986 – Var e vargen (7" single) Mlrs 48
- 1986 – Var e vargen (12" single) Mlrmz 7
- 1986 – Peace (7" single) Mlrs 49
- 1986 – Peace (12" single) Mlrmz 49
- 1988 – Imperiet (Album) Mlr 61
- 1988 – Imperiet (Album, collection) Mlr 64/65
- 1988 – Kickar (Album, collection) Mlr 79
- 1995 – C.C. Cowboys (Promo CD-single) Mnwpr9505
- 1995 – Greatest Hits (Album, collection) Mnw279
- 2002 – Alltid rött, alltid rätt (Album, collection) Mnwcd2005
- 2007 – Klassiker (Album, collection) Mnwcd2031
- 2009 – Silver, guld & misär (Box, collection) Mlrcd115
- 2017 – Silver, guld & misär (Vinylbox, collection) 060255732809

== Versions ==
- "Original version" (Mlrs 48, Mlrmz 7, Mlr 79, 060255732809)
- "Unreleased version" (Mlr 64/65, 060255732809) – the original version: Den vilda världen, from 1985
- Remix -95 (Mnwpr9505, Mnw279, Mnwcd2005, Mnwcd2031, Mlrcd115)
- Vargen Dub (Mlrmz 7, 060255732809)
- The Wild World (Mlrs 49)
- The Wild World remix (Mlrmz 49)
- Wild World (Mlrs 49)

== Covers ==
- 1996 – Var är vargen, by Ulf Lundell; B-side to the single Upp
- 2014 – Var e vargen, by Martin Rubashov; also included on the EP Silvae.
- 2024 – Var e vargen, by Saga
