= Onkel Kånkel =

Swedish musical group

Onkel Kånkel and his Kånkelbär (English: (approx.) "Uncle Dingle and his Dingleberries"), commonly referred to as just Onkel Kånkel, was a Swedish könsrock/punk rock band known for lyrics with off-color humor, dealing with subjects such as disabled people, disorders and diseases, Nazism, homosexuality, pedophilia, and coprophilia, often with elements of toilet humor. Many songs reference Swedish TV and radio personalities. Onkel Kånkel is often considered to have created the könsrock genre.

While well known for their shock value, Onkel Kånkel's music has never entered the mainstream, though the band managed to get the 46th placement on the Swedish top-50 chart in 1994. One of their albums, Kalle Anka Suger Pung (English: Donald Duck Sucks Ballsack), briefly had some radio airplay, but was pulled off the air due to perceived inappropriate content. More recently, the Internet has spread Onkel Kånkel to a younger generation.

Onkel Kånkel has been compared to Eddie Meduza and Johnny Bode.

Onkel Kånkel's frontman and singer/guitarist Håkan Florå wore a mask while performing so as to "not take away the mystery".

Håkan Florå died of a heart attack aged 47 on 15 August 2009.

== Controversies ==
At the 1993 Hultsfred festival, during the first of the few live shows the band performed, an intellectually disabled man not part of the band was invited on stage, singing along to choruses and telling jokes between songs. This caused controversy as some people considered it to be mocking people with disabilities. When interviewed about the accusations, Onkel Kånkel answered "That is bullshit. The concert was among the most fun things he has ever experienced. He is a really fun guy. It is not wrong to laugh at disabled people, what's wrong is to ignore them, to treat them as if they did not exist."

== Members ==
The number of band members and their degree of involvement has never been firmly established. Only Håkan Florå has had his identity as the band's frontman revealed to the general public, after his death. While some have speculated that he was the only member, he stated in interviews that there were other members. These are the officially credited members:

- Onkel Kånkel – vocals, guitar
- Epilepsi Kurt – drums, percussion
- Arne Tammer – special effects, vocals
- CP Sven – bass, vocals
- Stomi Bertil – guitar, vocals

== Discography ==
- Svenska Tonårsgrupper Vol 3 (1981, 12" LP, Konkurens Rekårdz) – the first appearance of Onkel Kånkel on vinyl, with the song "Nazzepenis i Führerns anus". More information about this album is available at http://www.punktipset.se/band.asp?id=505&bID=660.
- Onkel Kånkels Gyllene Tider (1983, 12" LP, Konkurens Rekårdz, remastered version released on CD with bonus tracks in 1993)
- Kalle Anka Suger Pung (1990, 12" LP, Tjockfet Records)
- Onkel Kånkels Underbara Värld (1993, CD, Konkurrens Records)
- Gammeldags Jul (1994, CD, Konkurrens Records)
- Onkel Kånkels fantastiska äfventyr (1999, CD, Konkurrens Records)
- Blitzkrieg Blepp (2003, CD, Konkurrens Records)

Three bootleg compilations with songs from early tape recordings were unofficially released on the internet in 2001:

- Sälla Toner Vol. 1 (2001)
- Sälla Toner Vol. 2 (2001)
- Sälla Toner Vol. 3 (2001)

In 1992, a tribute album called Kånkelmania was released, featuring Onkel Kånkel covers. Participating bands and artists were Stig Vig, Charta 77 and Union Carbide Productions.
