= Xplodera mig 2000 =

Studio album by Thåström
- Released: 1991
- Genre: rock
- Length: 43:00
- Label: Mistlur
- Producer: Joakim Thåström, Sankan Sandqvist

Thåström chronology
Thåström (1989)	Xplodera mig 2000 (1991)	Singoalla (1998)

Xplodera mig 2000 is the second solo album by Swedish rock musician Joakim Thåström, released in 1991. On this album, he decided to make a drastic change in his musical style, opting for a harder and more raw form of rock. This was likely a transitional album, musically paving the way for his next project: Peace Love & Pitbulls.

== Track listing ==
1. Radio Thåström – 3:25
2. Ich liebe dich – 4:19
3. Elektrisk – 4:40 (Electric)
4. Elvis Presley för en dag – 4:40 (Elvis Presley For A Day)
5. King Kong – 3:10
6. Miss Huddinge −72 – 5:07
7. Alla har fel (igen) – 3:16 (Everybody Is Wrong (Again))
8. Xplodera Mig (Thåström, Peter Puders, Sankan Sandqvist) – 4:40 (Xplode Me)
9. Fuzzbox – 4:20
10. Ballad i P-moll – 5:48 (Ballad In P-Minor Scale)
- All songs by Joakim Thåström except where it's noted.

== Personnel ==
- Joakim Thåström – Lead vocals, guitars
- Chips Kiesbye – Guitar
- Peter Puders – Guitar
- Sankan Sandqvist – drums, backing vocals
- Anna-Karin Andersson – Jingle
- Fjodor – vocals
- Carla Jonsson – vocals
- Jonas Lindgren – Violin
- Anders Karlén – Guitar
- Peter Sandqvist – Pere FX
- Jocke Ekström – Saxophone
- Martin Thors – backing vocals
- Stefan Björk – Bass
- Sator – backing vocals
- Einar Heckscher – Talking
- Henryk Lipp – Choir arrangements, synthesizer
- Michael Ilbert – String arrangements, programming
- Fläskkvartetten – Strings

== Singles ==
- 1991 – Alla har fel
- 1991 – Xplodera Mig
