= Imperiet (EP) =

1984 EP by Imperiet

EP by Imperiet
- Released: 1 April 1984
- Studio: Mistlur (Stockholm)
- Genre: Alternative rock
- Length: 24:14
- Label: Mistlur
- Producer: Stefan Glaumann

Imperiet chronology
Rasera (1983)	Imperiet (1984)	Blå himlen blues (1985)

Imperiet is an EP by Swedish rock band Imperiet, released on 1 April 1984 by Mistlur Records.

== Track listing ==
All tracks are written by Imperiet

Imperiet – Side one
No.	Title	Length
1.	"Det glittrar"	4:02
2.	"Dekadenser"	3:34
3.	"Kickar"	5:06
Total length:		12:42

Imperiet – Side two
No.	Title	Length
1.	"Kriget med mej själv"	4:27
2.	"Gigolo Blues"	3:29
3.	"Jag kan inte leva utan dej"	3:36
Total length:		11:32

== Charts ==
Weekly chart performance for Imperiet
Chart (1984–1988)	Peak position
Swedish Albums (Sverigetopplistan)	20
