= Ebba the Movie =

- Swedish DVD-cover
- Directed by: Johan Donner
- Produced by: Lisbet Gabrielsson; Anders Holt
- Starring: Joakim Thåström; Lennart Eriksson; Gunnar Ljungstedt
- Music by: Ebba Grön, Dag Vag
- Distributed by: Svenska Filminstitutet
- Release date: 6 October 1982
- Running time: 78 min.
- Country: Sweden
- Language: Swedish

Ebba the Movie is a documentary film of Swedish punk band Ebba Grön from 1982, by director and writer Johan Donner.

The film includes a lot of live music and interviews with the band's members. It starts in Rågsved, a working class suburb of Stockholm, and follows Ebba Grön on tour around Sweden until the band returns to Rågsved.

The Swedish reggae band Dag Vag also participates in a part of the movie when Ebba is on tour.

There are two versions of the film. When released in 1982, the movie was originally 78 minutes long. Johan Donner later cut down the film to a 52 minutes version which he called the Hardcore version. Both versions are included in the DVD-release.

The title of the film is a reference to the 1977 documentary film ABBA: The Movie, featuring fellow Swedes ABBA. The reference is intended to be ironic, since Ebba Grön's style is very different from that of ABBA.
