= Sjöholm =

Sjöholm is a Swedish surname.

== Geographical distribution ==
As of 2014, 72.4% of all known bearers of the surname Sjöholm were residents of Sweden (frequency 1:2,953) and 26.3% of Finland (1:4,535).

In Sweden, the frequency of the surname was higher than national average (1:2,953) in the following counties:

1. Skåne County (1:1,418)
2. Blekinge County (1:1,480)
3. Örebro County (1:2,128)
4. Halland County (1:2,614)
5. Östergötland County (1:2,652)

In Finland, the frequency of the surname was higher than national average (1:4,535) in the following regions:

1. Ostrobothnia (1:1,121)
2. Åland (1:1,196)
3. Southwest Finland (1:1,435)
4. Uusimaa (1:3,019)
5. Satakunta (1:3,186)
6. South Karelia (1:4,206)

== People ==
- Anders Sjöholm, Swedish musician
- Helen Sjöholm, Swedish singer and actress
- Joel Sjöholm, Swedish golfer
