= Rasera =

1983 studio album by Imperiet

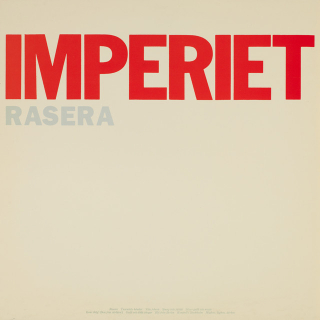

Studio album by Imperiet
- Released: 1983
- Studio: Mistlur (Stockholm)
- Genre: Rock
- Length: 36:06
- Label: Mistlur
- Producers: Imperiet; Stefan Glaumann

Imperiet chronology
Rasera (1983)	Imperiet (1984)

Rasera is the debut album by the Swedish rock band Imperiet, released in 1983.

== Track listing ==
All tracks are written by Imperiet.

Rasera – Side one
No.	Title	Length
1.	"Rasera"	3:37
2.	"Tusentals händer"	4:11
3.	"Vita febern"	3:17
4.	"Sjung inte falskt"	3:03
5.	"Silver, guld och misär"	4:15
Total length:		18:23

Rasera – Side two
No.	Title	Length
1.	"Kom ihåg! (Den fria världen?)"	2:27
2.	"Guld och döda skogar"	2:59
3.	"Blå från Berlin"	4:16
4.	"Kontroll i Stockholm"	3:47
5.	"Höghus, låghus, dårhus"	4:14
Total length:		17:43

== Charts ==
Weekly chart performance for Rasera
Chart (1983)	Peak position
Swedish Albums (Sverigetopplistan)	11
