= Ebba Grön 1978–1982 =

Compilation album by Ebba Grön

Compilation album by Ebba Grön
- Released: 1987
- Recorded: 1978–1982
- Genre: Punk
- Length: 69:15
- Label: Mistlur
- Producer: Ebba Grön, Tony Thorén, Stefan Glaumann

Ebba Grön chronology
Ebba Grön (1981)	Ebba Grön 1978–1982 (1987)	Ebba Grön Live (1998)

Ebba Grön 1978–1982 is a 1987 compilation album by Swedish punk band Ebba Grön. It was released as a farewell album for their fans, and is one of the all-time best selling records in Sweden. The booklet contains a copy of the letter the band sent to the national news agency Tidningarnas Telegrambyrå when they split.

== Track listing ==
1. Profit (02:01)
2. Ung & Sänkt (01:53)
3. Tyst För Fan (02:29)
4. Mona Tumbas Slim Club (02:27)
5. Vad Skall Du Bli (02:36)
6. Häng Gud (02:05)
7. We're Only in It for the Drugs (04:23)
8. Totalvägra (01:50)
9. Beväpna Er (03:23)
10. Det Måste Vara Radion (02:09)
11. Pervers Politiker (02:05)
12. Staten & Kapitalet (05:26)
13. Ung & Kåt (03:07)
14. 800° (03:51)
15. Mamma Pappa Barn (02:57)
16. Mental Istid (03:03)
17. Scheisse (03:10)
18. Flyktsoda (03:55)
19. Uppgång & Fall (03:40)
20. Die Mauer (04:03)
21. Tittar På TV (05:27)
22. Nu Släckas Tusen Människoliv (03:03)
