= Kärlek & uppror =

1981 studio album by Ebba Grön

Studio album by Ebba Grön
- Released: March 1981
- Recorded: December 1980 – February 1981
- Studio: Mistlur (Stockholm)
- Genre: Punk rock
- Length: 39:44
- Label: Mistlur
- Producer: Stefan Glaumann

Ebba Grön chronology
We're Only in It for the Drugs (1979)	Kärlek & uppror (1981)	Ebba Grön (1982)

Kärlek & uppror is the second studio album by Swedish punk band Ebba Grön, released in March 1981 by Mistlur Records.

== Track listing ==
All tracks are written by Ebba Grön, except where noted

Kärlek & uppror – Side one
No.	Title	Length
1.	"800°C"	3:44
2.	"Mamma pappa barn"	2:58
3.	"Stockholms pärlor" (writer: Stry Terrarie)	2:50
4.	"Alla visa män"	2:36
5.	"Svart & vitt"	7:22
Total length:		19:30

Kärlek & uppror – Side two
No.	Title	Length
1.	"Mental istid"	3:01
2.	"Till havs"	4:17
3.	"Turist i tillvaron"	2:26
4.	"Slicka uppåt, sparka neråt!"	4:16
5.	"Mord i mina tankar"	3:18
6.	"Hat & blod"	2:56
Total length:		20:14

== Charts ==
Weekly chart performance for Kärlek & uppror
Chart (1981)	Peak position
Swedish Albums (Sverigetopplistan)	5
