= Sällskapet =

Sällskapet may refer to:

- Sällskapet (album), a debut music album by the eponymous Swedish band
- Sällskapet (band), a Swedish electronic rock music band
- Sällskapet (club), a Swedish gentlemen's club established in Stockholm in 1800
- Sällskapet till belöning för trotjänare, a non-profit prize-giving organisation in Sweden
- Sällskapet Du Londel, an alternative name for Du Londel Troupe in Sweden
- Välgörande fruntimmerssällskapet, Swedish women's charitable society
