= Det är ni som e dom konstiga, det är jag som e normal =

Studio album by Thåström
- Released: 1999
- Genre: Hard Rock
- Length: 43:00
- Label: Mistlur
- Producer: Mikael Herrström, Joakim Thåström and Henryk Lipp

Thåström chronology
Singoalla (1998)	Det är ni som e dom konstiga, det är jag som e normal (1999)	Mannen som blev en gris (2002)

Det är ni som e dom konstiga, det är jag som e normal (English translation: You Are the Strange Ones, I Am the Normal One) is the third solo album of Swedish rock musician Joakim Thåström (not counting the soundtrack Singoalla). It was released in 1999 and was the first solo album after his time with his industrial rock band Peace Love & Pitbulls. It was much celebrated in Sweden, by fans and critics, and considered a return to Thåström's rock roots.

AllMusic rated the album four stars, describing it as "actually more solid than Thåström's two former solo albums, and compete well with most of his catalog."

== Track listing ==
No.	Title	Length
1.	"Från Himlen Sänt"	4:25
2.	"En Vacker Död Stad"	3:14
3.	"Hjärter Dam"	4:11
4.	"... Ingen Neråtsång" (written by Thåström and Per Hägglund)	5:52
5.	"Två + Två"	4:28
6.	"Städer När Jag Blöder" (written by Thåström and Henryk Lipp)	4:45
7.	"Suverän" (written by Thåström and Per Hägglund)	4:39
8.	"Precis Som Ni" (written by Thåström and Per Hägglund)	4:54
9.	"Ingenting Gör Mig"	3:39
10.	"Psalm #99"	3:05
Total length:		43:12

- All songs are written by Joakim Thåström except where noted

== Personnel ==
- Joakim Thåström – vocals, guitar, bass, organ
- Jörgen Wall – drums
- Heiki Kiviaho – bass
- Chips Kiesbye – guitar
- Henrik af Ugglas – organ
- Mikael Vestergren – guitar
- Micke Herrström – guitar, backing vocals
- Johan Reivén – bass, drums
- Tomas Brandt – guitar
- Henryk Lipp – Mellotron, synthesizers, programming
- Lotta Johansson – violin

== Singles ==
- "Hjärter dam"
- "Två + två"
- "Städer när jag blöder"
