= Evert (song) =

Eddie Meduza song

Song by Eddie Meduza

from the album Harley Davidson
- Language: Swedish
- Released: 1995
- Genre: country, dansband music
- Label: KM
- Songwriter: Eddie Meduza

"Evert" is a song written by Eddie Meduza. The song was originally recorded by Meduza for the 1995 album Harley Davidson. In 1997, the song was recorded by Matz Stefanz med Lailaz for the album Matz-Ztefanz med Lailaz Volym 1.

The original version is sung from a first person-perspective ("Jag går på stigen som går till Evert..." = "I walk the path that leads to Evert"), while the Matz Stefanz med Lailaz version is sung from a we perspective ("Vi går på stigen som går till Evert..." = "we walk the path that leads to Evert").

== Charts ==
The Matz-Ztefanz med Lailaz version charted for 22 weeks at the top 10-chart Svensktoppen between 9 August 1997-3 January 1998 before leaving chart.
