= Bonafide (band) =

Swedish hard rock band

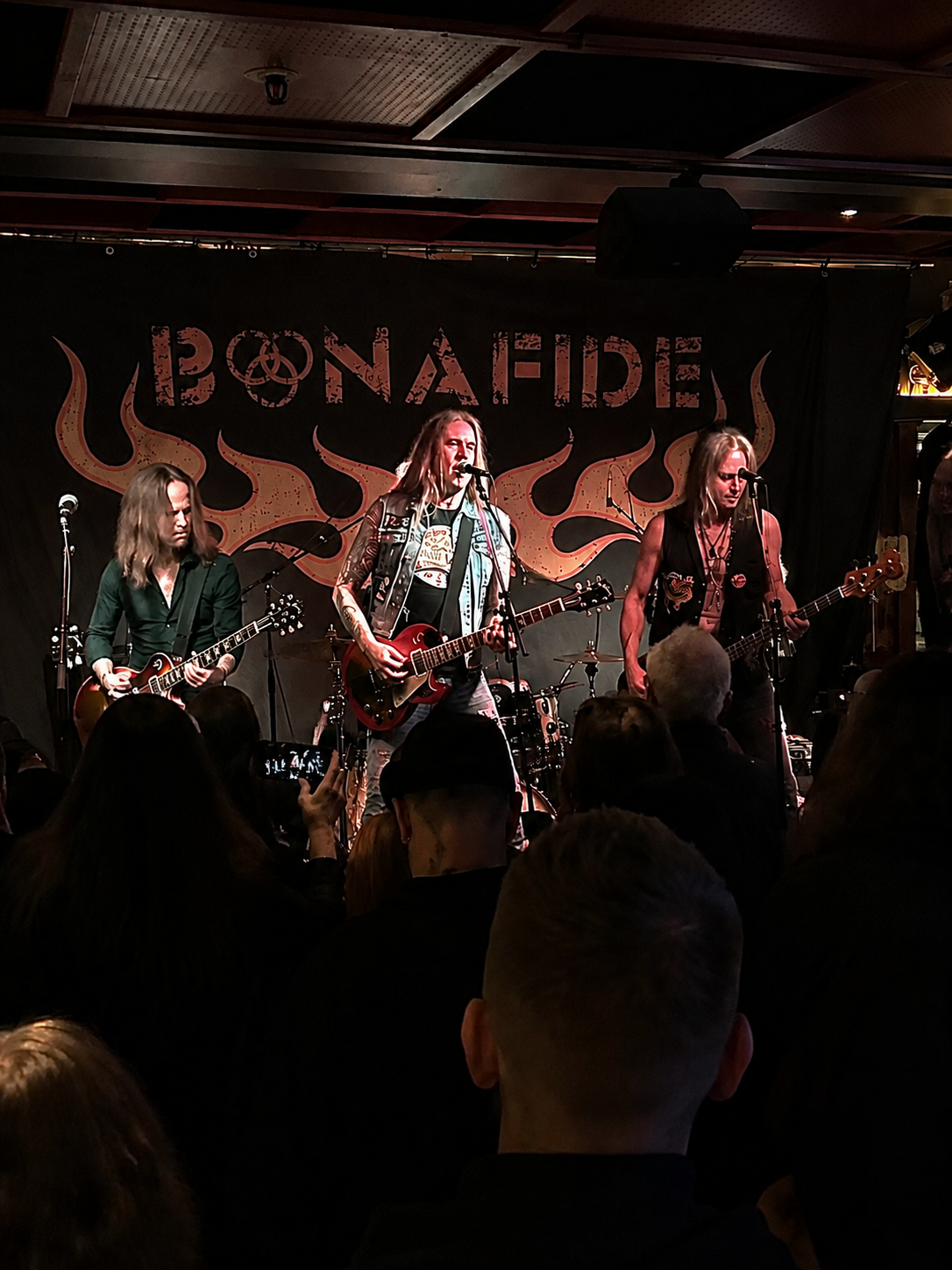
- Anders Rosell, Pontus Snibb, and Martin Ekelund live in Stockholm 2024.

Background information
- Origin: Malmö, Sweden
- Genres: Hard rock, classic rock
- Years active: 2007-present
- Labels: Sound Pollution, Sweden Rock Records, Off Yer Rocka, Black Lodge Records
- Members: Pontus Snibb; Anders Rosell; Martin Ekelund
- Past members: Micke Nilsson; Sticky Bomb; Mikael Fässberg; Niklas Matsson
- Website: bonafiderocks.se

Bonafide is a Swedish hard rock band formed in Malmö in 2006 by singer, guitarist and songwriter Pontus Snibb. Since its formation, the band has released seven studio albums, one live album and several EPs, and has toured extensively throughout Europe, supporting artists including Deep Purple, Status Quo, The Quireboys, Nazareth and Black Star Riders. Bonafide wrote the official anthem for the Sweden Rock Festival in 2008, Fill Your Head With Rock, which was later named one of the best songs of 2011 by Classic Rock magazine.

== History ==
=== Formation ===
After several years performing blues, rhythm and blues, Americana and rock with projects including Mescaleros, SNiBB and Buckaroos, as well as serving as drummer for American country-punk band Jason & the Scorchers, Pontus Snibb decided to return to the classic hard rock that had inspired him as a teenager. Originally conceived as a side project, Bonafide was formed in Malmö in 2006.

Snibb and bassist Micke Nilsson recorded material for a debut album in Snibb's home studio in 2006, with Snibb performing lead vocals, guitar and drums, while Nilsson played bass. Shortly after the recording sessions, guitarist Mikael Fässberg, who had previously toured with former Iron Maiden vocalist Paul Di'Anno, and drummer Sticky Bomb (Per-Åke Holmberg), formerly of Kriminella Gitarrer, Wilmer X and Torsson, joined the band, completing Bonafide's first full line-up.

=== Debut and Something's Dripping ===
Bonafide, the band's self-titled debut album, was released by Black Lodge Records in September 2007. Recorded primarily in Pontus Snibb's home studio, the album featured Snibb on lead vocals, guitar and drums, while Micke Nilsson played bass. Following the recording sessions, several guitar solos were re-recorded by Mikael Fässberg after he joined the band, while drummer Sticky Bomb completed the line-up ahead of the band's live debut.

To promote the album, Bonafide embarked on an extensive touring schedule across Sweden and Scandinavia, combining headline club shows with support slots for bands including The Quireboys, Deep Purple, Europe and Y&T. The band also released its debut single and music video, Loud Band, in late 2007.

In 2008, Bonafide performed twice at the Sweden Rock Festival, including a last-minute appearance replacing former Skid Row vocalist Sebastian Bach after he cancelled his performance. The festival exposure led to an expanded international edition of the debut album, released by Black Lodge Records in 2009, featuring the live recordings Hard Case to Break and Nighttime from Sweden Rock together with a cover of Nazareth's Miss Misery.

Later in 2008, Bonafide began pre-production of their second studio album with producer Chips Kiesbye (Sator). Recorded at Music-a-Matic Studios in Gothenburg, Something's Dripping was released in September 2009. The album featured the first songwriting collaborations between Pontus Snibb and Mikael Fässberg, who co-wrote the songs Hard Livin' Man and Dog. The album received positive reviews upon release and was supported by Bonafide's first European tour as support act for Crucified Barbara. It was supported by Bonafide's first European tour as support act for Crucified Barbara.

=== Line-up changes ===
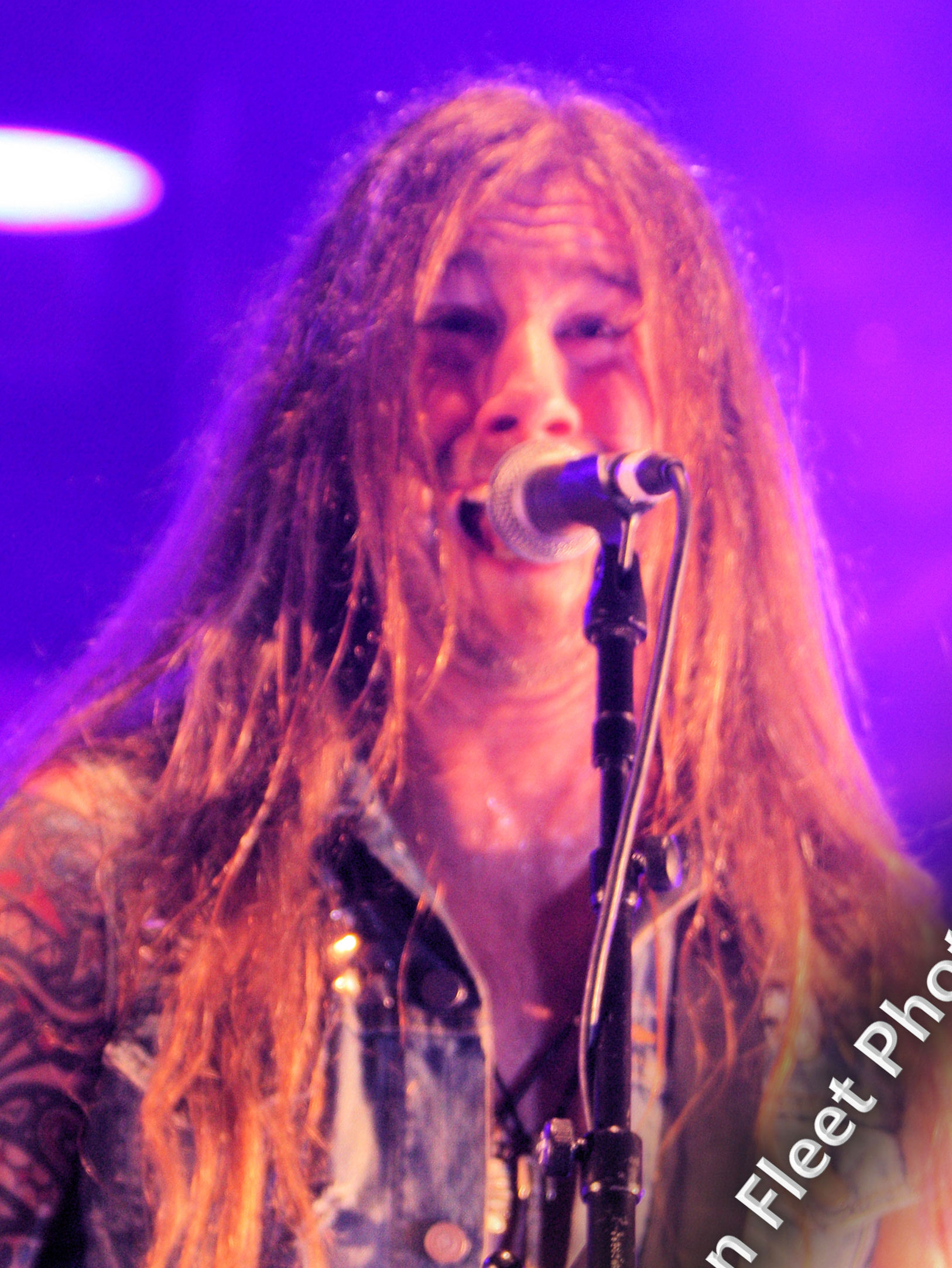
Pontus Snibb performed lead vocals, guitar and drums on the band's debut album.

Bonafide began 2010 with a Scandinavian tour before drummer Sticky Bomb left the band. He was initially replaced by Niklas Matsson for a tour of Spain before being confirmed as the band's permanent drummer in April 2010. Later that year, Bonafide toured extensively across Europe, including shows with Nazareth, The Quireboys and Y&T, and released a music video for Hard Livin' Man, featuring footage from the band's 2009 European tour.

In January 2011, Bonafide released the EP Fill Your Head With Rock – Old, New, Tried & True, featuring the previously unreleased song Kick Me Out, new recordings of Fill Your Head With Rock and No Doubt About It, together with covers of I Don't Need No Doctor, I Can't Explain and Nice Boys (Don't Play Rock 'n' Roll). The EP topped the Swedish mid-price chart and received positive reviews in both Sweden and abroad.

Bonafide spent much of 2011 touring across Scandinavia and mainland Europe, performing more than 60 concerts in 13 countries. During the year, founding bassist Micke Nilsson left the band and was replaced by Martin Ekelund, whose arrival marked the beginning of a new line-up. Rehearsals for the band's next studio album began later that year, while Bonafide continued touring, including a performance at Debaser Medis in Stockholm with Electric Boys.

=== Ultimate Rebel and Bombo ===
In 2012, Bonafide released their third studio album, Ultimate Rebel. The album was preceded by the single Doing the Pretty and the music video for Too Fired Up. Written largely while touring Europe and recorded in Stockholm, Ultimate Rebel was produced by Pontus Snibb and received positive reviews from the music press. The album was supported by tours in Scandinavia and the United Kingdom, as well as appearances at festivals including the Sweden Rock Festival.

On 1 July 2013, Bonafide released the live DVD Messin' in Wales – Live at Hard Rock Hell 2012, documenting the band's performance at the Hard Rock Hell festival in Wales during the Ultimate Rebel tour. Their fourth studio album, Bombo, followed later the same year. Produced by Snibb, the album continued the band's hard rock style while incorporating a broader range of musical influences than its predecessor. It received positive reviews and was supported by a European tour.

In November 2013, guitarist Mikael Fässberg announced his departure from Bonafide after six years with the band. His final performances took place during the band's European tour and their annual end-of-year concerts at Akkurat in Stockholm.

=== Anders Rosell joins the band and Denim Devils ===
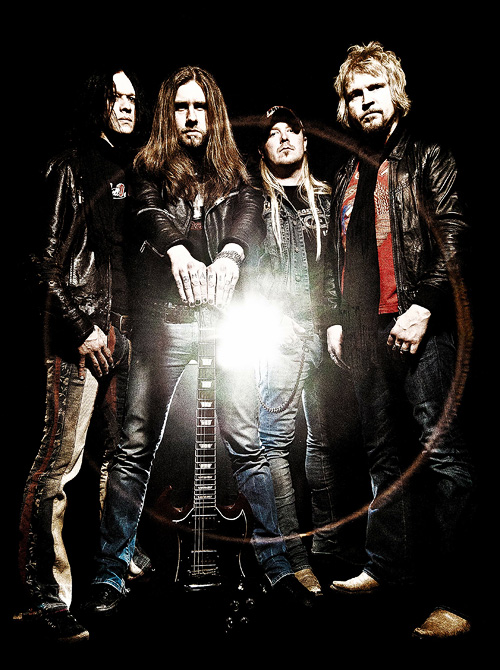
Bonafide 2011 with Martin Ekelund, Pontus Snibb, Niklas Matsson and Mikael Fässberg.

In January 2014, guitarist Anders Rosell joined Bonafide, replacing Mikael Fässberg. Rosell, a largely self-taught guitarist whose influences included Jimi Hendrix, Stevie Ray Vaughan and Keith Richards, became an important contributor to the band's songwriting alongside Pontus Snibb. Later that year, Bonafide began recording their fifth studio album at Lemon Recording Studio in Klippan and released the single Hold Down the Fort in advance of the album. The band also toured Europe as support act for Australian hard rock band Airbourne.

Denim Devils was released on 2 February 2015 through Off Yer Rocka Recordings. Recorded largely live in the studio and produced by Pontus Snibb, the album continued Bonafide's blues-based hard rock style while introducing Rosell on guitar. The album was supported by extensive touring in Sweden, the United Kingdom and Spain, with songs including Hold Down the Fort, 50/50 and One Kiss becoming regular features of the band's live set.

Later in 2015, Bonafide released Treble Charged, a limited-edition vinyl box set containing Ultimate Rebel (2012), Bombo (2013) and Denim Devils (2015). Limited to 500 copies, the collection was released in conjunction with the band's Scandinavian tour supporting Black Star Riders.

=== Flames and Live at KB ===
Bonafide released their sixth studio album, Flames, on 24 February 2017. Produced by Pontus Snibb, the album combined the band's established hard rock sound with influences from soul and gospel. It received positive reviews and was supported by more than 30 concerts across Sweden, the United Kingdom and Spain. Songs including Back in Flames, Bottle of Jack and Power Down became regular features of the band's live set. Later that year, Bonafide received nominations in the GAFFA Awards for Best Group and Best Hard Rock/Metal.

In February 2018, Bonafide recorded their first live album during a concert at Kulturbolaget (KB) in Malmö. Throughout the year, the band continued touring across Sweden, Finland and the United Kingdom, including two concerts supporting Deep Purple in Finland. During the same year, former guitarist Mikael Fässberg died at the age of 49. In a public statement, the band described him as a colleague, friend, brother and musician, and recalled the hundreds of concerts and thousands of kilometres they had shared during his time with Bonafide. The members also expressed their condolences to his family.

Released on 15 March 2019, Live at KB documented the band's performance at Kulturbolaget the previous year. Issued on LP and CD, the album was recorded without overdubs or studio editing and featured material spanning Bonafide's first six studio albums. During 2019, the band continued touring across Europe, appearing at festivals including Bonfest in Scotland, Malmöfestivalen and Kopparbergsfestivalen, before concluding the year with a series of concerts at Zum Franziskaner in Stockholm.

=== Are You Listening? and return to a trio ===
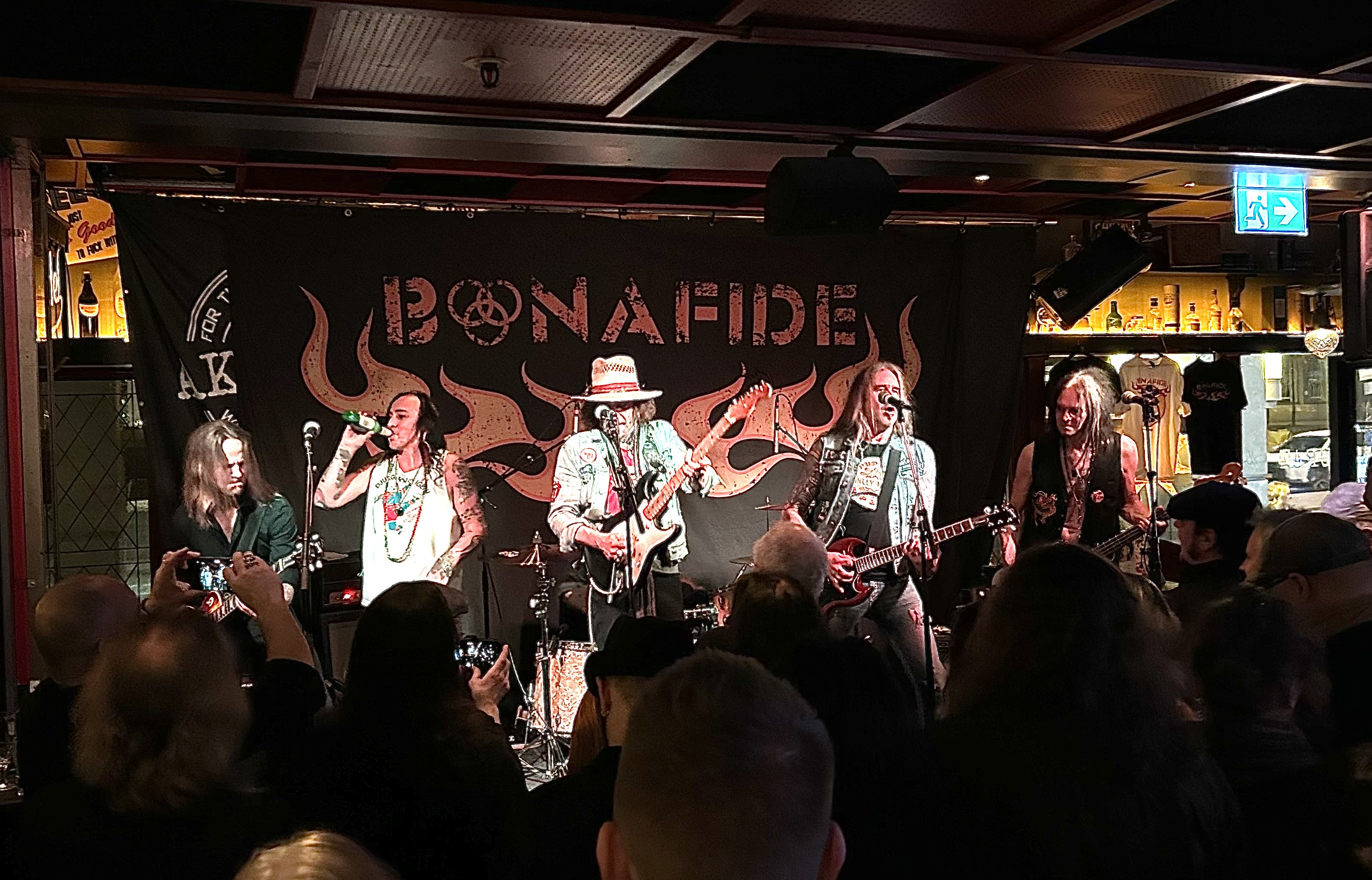
Bonafide with guest musicians Dregen and Conny Bloom, 2024.

Like many touring bands, Bonafide's activities were affected by the COVID-19 pandemic in 2020 and 2021, resulting in the postponement of most live performances. During the period, the band focused on writing new material and made a limited return to the stage in 2021.

Following the resumption of touring in 2022, Bonafide appeared at festivals and venues across Sweden and Europe, including the Sweden Rock Festival, Malmö Rock Festival and Rock at Sea, as well as a series of concerts with Nazareth.

In 2023, Bonafide returned to Black Lodge Records and released their eighth studio album, Are You Listening?, produced by Chips Kiesbye. The album featured songwriting contributions from all four band members, with Pontus Snibb sharing writing credits with Anders Rosell, Niklas Matsson and Martin Ekelund, alongside contributions from Filippa Nässil, Pär Hellberg and James Braban. It also marked Matsson's debut as lead vocalist on the song Tonight I'm Wild. Later that year, the band released the single Snacket, a collaboration with Nisse Hellberg and Bonafide's first song performed in Swedish. The album received positive reviews and was supported by festival appearances and a European tour.

Bonafide continued touring throughout 2024, appearing at festivals including Azkena Rock Festival in Spain and Stonedead Festival in the United Kingdom, while Pontus Snibb received a nomination for International Frontman at the Hard Rock Hell Awards.

In 2025, Bonafide celebrated their twentieth anniversary with a series of concerts across Scandinavia and Europe and released the anniversary single Payday, accompanied by live recordings from the band's 2023 Danish tour. In June 2026, drummer Niklas Matsson announced his departure from the band after sixteen years as a member. Bonafide subsequently confirmed that they would continue as a power trio, with guitarist Anders Rosell moving to drums while Pontus Snibb assumed sole guitar duties. The band also announced that work had begun on a new studio album.

== Members ==
Current members

- Pontus Snibb – vocals, guitar (2007–present)
- Martin Ekelund – bass (2011–present)
- Anders Rosell - drums (2026-present), guitar (2014–2026)

Former members

- Sticky Bomb – drums (2007–2010)
- Micke Nilsson – bass (2007–2011)
- Mikael Fässberg – guitar (2007–2013) (Died in 2018)
- Niklas Matsson – drums (2010–2026)

== Discography ==
Studio albums

- Bonafide (2007, Sweden Rock Records)
- Something's Dripping (2009, Sound Pollution)
- Ultimate Rebel (2012, Rootsy/Off Yer Rocka)
- Bombo (2013, Off Yer Rocka)
- Denim Devils (2015, Off Yer Rocka)
- Flames (2017, Off Yer Rocka)
- Are You Listening? (2023, Black Lodge Records)

Live albums

Live At KB (2019, Haaaarlett)

Extended plays

- Fill Your Head With Rock – Old, New, Tried & True (2011, Sound Pollution)
