= Pelle Ossler =

Swedish rock musician and singer (born 1962)

- Birth name: Pelle Ossler
- Born: 18 November 1962 (age 62)
- Origin: Bjuv, Sweden
- Genres: Rock, alternative, industrial
- Occupation(s): Musician, songwriter
- Instrument(s): Vocals, Guitar, Keyboards

Pelle Ossler (born 1962 in Bjuv) is a Swedish rock musician and singer, most known for his collaboration with Joakim Thåström, both on Thåström's solo releases and their industrial project Sällskapet.

== Recording career ==
Ossler was the guitarist of the rock band Wilmer X between 1986 and 2003 as well as the guitarist and vocalist of Amazonas. After his departure from Wilmer X Ossler has embarked on a solo career. Ossler was also a part of the reggae band Sir Lord Erotic which released their debut album—No No Lola—produced by Peps Persson in 1995. Since 2002 Ossler has collaborated closely with Swedish punk legend Joakim Thåström both on Thåström's solo albums and with their post industrial rock Sällskapet along with Niklas Hellberg. The band had long been a secret before their debut in 2007, the status of the band is currently unknown. Ossler has also released five albums as a solo artist, the latest—Ett Brus from 2008—was recorded at the legendary Hansa studio in Berlin, Germany. Besides his musical work Ossler is also studying to be a carpenter.

== Musical equipment ==
Ossler primarily plays a Gibson Trini Lopez with P-90 pickups or a Guild Starfire during live performances and recording sessions. A 1959 Levin is also used during recordings but not used during tour since its hard to keep in tune and to in keep proper intonation. For effects Ossler mainly uses tremolo effects and a Dynacord tape delay. For amplification Ossler uses a 1967 Fender Vibrolux combo or a Fender Bassman through a Marshall 2x10 cabinet.

== Selected discography ==
With Wilmer X

- V.I.L.D (1986)
- Tungt vatten (1986)
- Downward Bound (1986)
- Not Glamourus (1987)
- Teknikens under (1988)
- Klubb Bongo (1989)
- Mambo feber (1991)
- En speciell kväll med Wilmer X (1991)
- Pontiac till himmelen (1993)
- Snakeshow (1994)
- Hallå världen (1995)
- Den blå vägen hem (1997)
- Primitiv (1998)
- Silver (2000)
- Totalt Wilmer X (2001)
- Lyckliga hundar (2003)

As a solo artist

- Hotel neanderthal (1997)
- Disorienterad (2001)
- Den siste som kom ut (2002)
- Krank (2005)
- Ett brus (2008)
- Stas (2013)

With Thåström

- Mannen som blev en gris (2002)
- Skebokvarnsv. 209 (2005)
- Kärlek är for dom (2009)

With Sällskapet

- Sällskapet - Sällskapet (2007)

Other appearances

- Sir Lord Erotic - No No Lola (1995)
- Stefan Sundström - Hjärtats Melodi (2005)
- Katharina Nuttall - Cherry Flavour Substitute (2008)
- Andi Almqvist - Glimmer (2009)
