= Dag Vag =

Swedish band

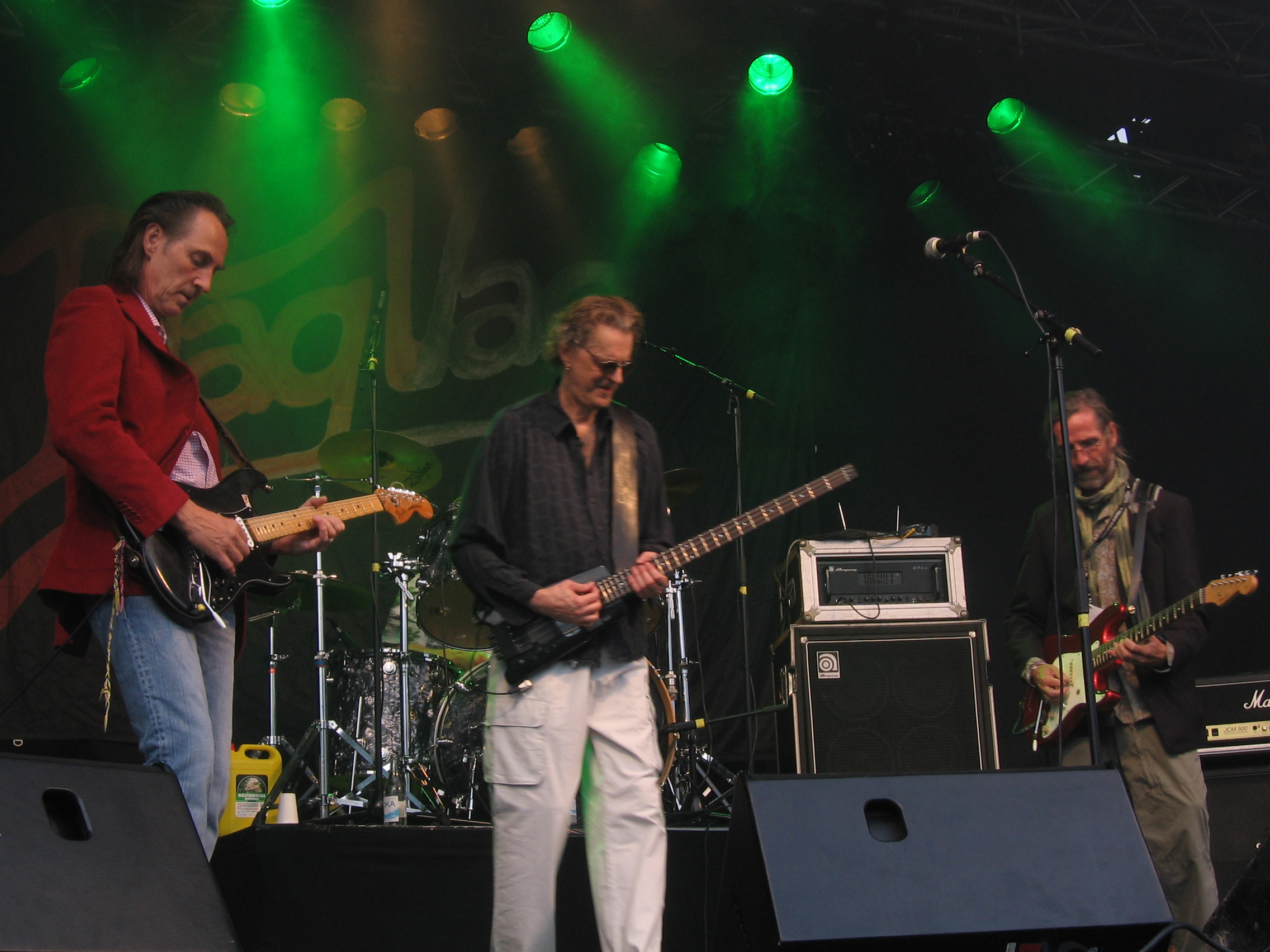
- Dag Vag in 2005

Background information
- Origin: Stockholm, Sweden
- Genres: Pop, reggae, punk, reggae rock
- Years active: 1978–present
- Labels: BALL, Silence, MNW
- Members: Tage Z Dirty; Zilverzurfarn; Teka Pukk
- Past members: Stig Vig; Bumpaberra; Beno Zeno; Per Cussion; Kopp Te; Olsson
- Website: www.dagvag.se

Dag Vag is a Swedish band formed in 1978. The lead singer was Per Odeltorp (1948–2012), popularly known as Stig Vig. Their early punk sound became, after a while, increasingly more reggae-like. The band referred to it as "transcontinental rock-reggae". Their popularity peaked in the 1980s, but they are still active.

Dag Vag sometimes toured with Swedish punk band Ebba Grön and made a cameo in their documentary film Ebba the Movie.

== Members ==
=== Current line up ===
- Tage Dirty - drums (1978–present)
- Zilverzurfarn - guitar, vocals (1978-2007, 2010–present)
- Teka Pukk - guitar (2008–present)

=== Former members ===
- Stig Vig - bass, vocals (1978-2012)
- Bumpaberra - keyboards (1978, 1981-1983, 1988-1990, 1999-2001)
- Beno Zeno - guitar (1979-1981, 1988-1992, 1999-2001, 2004-2010)
- Per Cussion - percussion, keyboards (1981-1983)
- Kopp Te - saxophones, flute (1981-1983, 1989-1992, 1999)
- Olsson - guitar (1978-1979)

== Discography ==
=== Studio albums ===
- 1979 - Dag Vag
- 1979 - Scenbuddism (Live)
- 1980 - Palsternacka
- 1982 - 7 lyckliga elefanter
- 1983 - Almanacka
- 1989 - Helq
- 1992 - Halleluja!
- 2006 - Kackerlacka
- 2007 - Klassiker
- 2012 - Nattmacka

=== Singles ===
- 1978 - Dimma (under the name Dag Vag & Svagsinta)
- 1978 - Flyger
- 1980 - Hellre en raket
- 1981 - Blöt dröm
- 1981 - Popitop
- 1983 - Samma sång
- 1989 - Du får aldrig nog
- 1989 - Tiden går
- 1990 - En gång till!
- 1991 - Nya skor
- 1992 - Hämta mej
- 1992 - Fyrverkeri
- 2006 - En del av dej

=== EP ===
- 2011 - epette
