= Niklas Hellberg =

Swedish musician

- Born: Niklas Hellberg
- Origin: Sweden
- Genres: Rock, alternative, industrial,
- Occupations: Musician, songwriter, producer
- Instruments: Piano, keyboards, organ, sampling, bass
- Website: http://www.citizenh.net

Niklas Hellberg (born 1964) is a Swedish musician and producer, most known for his collaborations with punk rocker Thåström.

== Biography ==
Hellberg was during the late 1980s a member of the post-punk band All That Jazz until its breakup in 1990. Hellberg was along with Thåström the main songwriters in Peace Love & Pitbulls an industrial rock band inspired by German industrial band Einstürzende Neubauten and Swedish heavy metal band Entombed. After the band's break up in 1997 Hellberg continued to work with Thåström on his solo records both during recordings and tours. Around 2003 Hellberg and Thåström founded Sällskapet along with guitarist Pelle Ossler, which released their self-titled album in 2007.

== Discography ==
With All That Jazz

- All That JAzz (1987)
- Color Blind (1990)

With Peace Love and Pitbulls

- Peace Love & Pitbulls (1993)
- Red sonic underwear (1994)
- Das neue konzept EP (1995)
- 3 (1997)
- War in My Livingroom 92–97 (2007)

With Thåström

- Mannen som blev en gris (2002)
- Skebokvarnsv. 209 (2005)
- Solo Vol 1 (2006)
- Kärlek är for dom (2009)

With Sällskapet

- Sällskapet (2007)
