= Blå himlen blues =

1985 studio album by Imperiet

Studio album by Imperiet
- Released: 15 March 1985
- Studio: Mistlur (Stockholm)
- Genre: Rock
- Label: Mistlur
- Producer: Imperiet; Jeff Eyrich; Stefan Glaumann

Imperiet chronology
Imperiet (1984)	Blå himlen blues (1985)	2:a Augusti 1985 (1985)

Blå himlen blues is the second studio album by Swedish rock band Imperiet, released in 1985.

== Track listing ==
1. "CC Cowboys" – 4:05
2. "Århundradets brott"(The Crime of the Century) – 5:22
3. "Sura-baya-Johnny" – 3:47
4. "Holländskt porslin" (Dutch Porcelain) – 4:39
5. "Tonårs-Jesus" (Teenage-Jesus) – 3:10
6. "Blå himlen blues" (Blue Heaven Blues) – 6:23
7. "Fat City" – 4:09
8. "Moderna män" (Modern Men) – 3:59
9. "Fred" (Peace) – 6:28

== Charts ==
Weekly chart performance for Blå himlen blues
Chart (1985–1986)	Peak position
Swedish Albums (Sverigetopplistan)	5
