= We're Only in It for the Drugs =

Studio album by Ebba Grön
- Released: November 1979
- Genre: Punk rock
- Length: 30:26
- Label: Mistlur
- Producer: Stefan Glaumann

Ebba Grön chronology
We're Only in It for the Drugs (1979)	Kärlek & uppror (1981)

Professional ratings
Review scores
Source	Rating
Allmusic	4.5/5 stars

We're Only in It for the Drugs is the debut album by the Swedish punk rock band Ebba Grön's, first released in November 1979. Most of the songs were recorded in September and October 1979 with Mistlurs mobile 8-channel mixer table in a closed industrial office on Fatbursgatan in Södermalm, Stockholm.

The title is a play on the 1968 Frank Zappa album We're Only in It for the Money.

== Track listing ==
All music is composed by Ebba Grön.

Side one
No.	Title	Length
1.	"We’re Only in It for the Drugs No. 1"	4:20
2.	"Totalvägra" (Conscientious objector)	1:49
3.	"Jag hatar söndagar" (I Hate Sundays)	2:33
4.	"Vad har jag gjort?" (What Have I Done?)	2:14
5.	"Sno från dom rika" (Steal From The Rich)	2:03
6.	"Beväpna er" (Arm Yourselves)	3:20

Side two
No.	Title	Length
7.	"Det måste vara radion" (It Has To Be The Radio)	2:08
8.	"Folk bits!" (People Bite!)	1:58
9.	"Flyger" (Flying, Dag Vag cover)	2:20
10.	"Schweden Schweden"	2:36
11.	"Pervers politiker" (Perverted Politician)	2:03
12.	"We’re Only In It for the Drugs No. 2"	2:44

2007 CD release bonus tracks
No.	Title	Length
13.	"Tyst för fan"	2:28
14.	"Vad ska du bli?"	2:36
