= Trettioåriga Kriget =

Swedish progressive rock band

- Origin: Saltsjöbaden, Stockholm, Sweden
- Genres: Progressive rock; art rock
- Years active: 1970–1981, 1992, 1996, 2003-present
- Labels: CBS Records, Epic Records, Mistlur Records, Mellotronen, Arcàngelo
- Members: Stefan Fredin; Dag Lundquist; Robert Zima; Christer Åkerberg; Mats Lindberg; Olle Thörnvall
- Past members: Johan Gullberg; Dag “Krok” Kronlund; Pocke Öhrström
- Website: trettioarigakriget.com

Trettioåriga Kriget (Swedish for Thirty Years' War) is a Swedish progressive rock group, formed in Saltsjöbaden, south of Stockholm, Sweden in 1970.

== Biography ==
The band was formed by members Stefan Fredin and Olle Thörnvall while they were still in high school. According to Fredin, during a history class Fredin shared with another original member Pocke Öhrström, "After a history lesson covering the Thirty Years' War, we both found that this name was perfect for the band. The reason was that it sounded both powerful and Swedish". The group was a six piece at first, including members Dag Lundquist, Johan Gullberg (who has since designed album covers for the group), and Dag “Krok” Kronlund. Gullberg, Öhrström, and Gullberg left the group in 1971. Singer Robert Zima joined shortly afterwards, along with guitarist Christer Åkerberg in 1972. A year after they received a record contract from CBS Records and recorded their debut Trettioåriga Kriget (1974), along with Krigssång (1975). In 1977, multi instrumentalist and Fredin's and Thörnvall's former schoolmate Mats Lindberg joined the group and with him they recorded Hej på er (1978), and Mot Alla Odds (1979).

After Zima left the group in 1979, the band temporarily shortened their name to "Kriget" and released one album under that name, Kriget (1981). Afterwards the group split up due to the members wanting to pursue solo careers. The group then reunited on two occasions in the 90's; once in 1992 to celebrate the re-release of Krigssång and without Lindberg, and in 1996 for two concerts in Mosebacke Etablissement in Stockholm, with Lindberg but without Zima. Then the group permanently reunited in 2003 with the return of both Lindberg and Zima and released Elden av år (2004), along with I början och slutet (2007), Efter efter (2011), and Seaside Air (2016), the last in English.

== Members ==
- Stefan Fredin - bass (1970–1981, 1992, 1996, 2003-)
- Dag Lundquist - drums (1970–1981, 1992, 1996, 2003-)
- Robert Zima - vocals, guitar (1971–1979, 1992, 2003-)
- Christer Åkerberg - guitar (1972–1981, 1992, 1996, 2003-)
- Mats Lindberg - keyboards, saxophone (1977–1981, 1996, 2003–)
- Olle Thörnvall - harmonica (1970–1972), lyricist (1972–1981, 2003–)
- Johan Gullberg - drums (1970–1971), cover design (1973–1981, 2004–)
- Dag “Krok” Kronlund - piano (1970–1972)
- Pocke Öhrström - guitar (1970–1971)

== Discography ==
=== Studio albums ===
- Trettioåriga Kriget (1974)
- Krigssång (1975)
- Hej på er (1978)
- Mot alla odds (1979)
- Kriget (1981) (as "Kriget")
- Glorious War 1970-1971 (2004)
- Elden av år (2004)
- I början och slutet (2007)
- Efter efter (2011)
- Seaside Air (2016)
- Till Horisonten (25th of March 2021)
