= Ebba Grön (album) =

Studio album by Ebba Grön
- Released: April 1982
- Recorded: January–February 1982
- Genre: Punk rock
- Length: 36:19
- Label: Mistlur Records
- Producer: Ebba Grön, Tony Thorén, Stefan Glaumann

Ebba Grön chronology
Kärlek & Uppror (1981)	Ebba Grön (1982)

Ebba Grön is the title of the Swedish punk band Ebba Grön's third and last album, first released April 1982. The album was recorded and mixed at Silence Studio between January and February 1982. Track 2, "Uppgång & fall" recorded and mixed at Mistlur's Studio.

The album includes the popular song Die Mauer, which is about two lovers separated by the Berlin Wall.

== Track listing ==
All music is composed by Ebba Grön

Side one
No.	Title	Length
1.	"Flyktsoda" (Escape soda)	3:50
2.	"Uppgång & fall" (Rise and fall)	3:36
3.	"Heroinister & kontorister" (Heroinists & clerks)	2:56
4.	"Stopp!"	3:15
5.	"Die Mauer"	4:00

Side two
No.	Title	Length
6.	"Musketör" (Musketeer)	3:21
7.	"Het choklad" (Hot Chocolate)	4:03
8.	"Handgranat... ge sig totalt" (Hand grenade... total surrender)	3:09
9.	"Kärlek e stark" (Love is strong)	2:28
10.	"Tittar på tv" (Watching tv)	5:24
