= West a Fool Away =

Studio album by Eddie Meduza
- Released: 25 September 1984
- Recorded: 1984, Studio Ronka
- Genre: Rock 'n roll
- Length: 43:29 (stoppad version); 44:04 (laglig version); 55:18 (CD release)
- Label: CBS

Eddie Meduza chronology
För jævla braa! (1982)	West a Fool Away (1984)	Ain't Got No Cadillac (1985)

West a Fool Away is an album by the Swedish rock 'n roll singer Eddie Meduza. It was released in 1984. The album mixed serious English rock songs with funny songs in Swedish. Side 1 had mainly English songs and side 2 was entirely Swedish except for the title track. The title refers to nonsense English sounding lyrics that early Swedish musicians made use of when they forgot the real lyrics.

Two versions of the album exist: the original "Stoppad" (Recalled) edition, which was only released on vinyl and cassette and the "Laglig" (Legal) edition, which got a CD release in 2002.

The album caused a minor controversy when track 12 of the Stoppad edition, "Heil Hitler", was played on a radio station. The track was intended to be an anti-war and anti-Nazi song, but its title could be misconstrued as endorsement of Nazism. As a result, CBS was ordered to have the album recalled and all unsold stock was pulled off Swedish shelves. The offending track was replaced with "Leader of the Rockers", a cover version of a track from Eddie's 1979 album "Eddie Meduza and the Roarin' Cadillacs".

In 2002, shortly after Eddie's death, his entire discography was released on CD. The CD version of West a Fool Away was based on the Laglig version and included three bonus tracks.

== Track listings ==
=== Stoppad version ===
No.	Title	Length
1.	"Hey Girl"	4:02
2.	"Hold Your Fire"	3:49
3.	"I Don't Love You Any More"	3:15
4.	"California"	2:16
5.	"Dead Man's Curve"	2:43
6.	"Sveriges kompani" (Swedish Company)	3:08
7.	"Studiostädare Börje Lundin" (Studio Cleaner Börje Lundin)	2:20
8.	"West a Fool Away (Noshörnings-version)" (West a Fool Away (Rhinoceros Version))	0:12
9.	"Undanflykter" (Evasions)	2:59
10.	"Punkar'n å raggar'n" (Punks and Raggars)	2:02
11.	"Sverige, vart e' vi på väg" (Sweden, Where Are We Going?)	3:27
12.	"Heil Hitler"	2:59
13.	"Dunder å snus (Cigarettes, Whiskey and Wild, Wild Women)" (Thunder and Snus)	3:59
14.	"Skarapersiflage"	3:22
15.	"West a Fool Away"	0:39
16.	"Bröderna Lundin rensar studion" (The Brothers Lundin Clean The Studio)	2:04
17.	"West a Fool Away (Elefant-version)" (West a Fool Away (Elephant Version))	0:12

=== Laglig version ===
On this version, "Sveriges kompani" was replaced as track 6 by "Leader of the Rockers", which runs 3:34. "Sveriges kompani" replaced "Heil Hitler" as track 12.

In 2002, the album was released as a CD and included these bonus tracks:

No.	Title	Length
18.	"Jag vill ha en brud med stora pattar" (I Want a Chick with Big Tits)	2:52
19.	"Hej på dej Evert, boogie-woogie" (Hello to You, Evert, Boogie-Woogie)	2:52
20.	"Fisdisco" (Fart Disco)	4:06
