= Könsrock =

Swedish music genre

- Stylistic origins: Punk rock; post-punk; shock rock; comedy rock
- Cultural origins: late-1970s Sweden
- Typical instruments: Vocals; electric guitar; bass; drums; drum machines

Könsrock (Swedish for Genitalia rock) is a Swedish music genre characterized by off-color humor, dealing with subjects such as handicapped people, disorders and diseases, homosexuality, and Nazism, often with strong elements of toilet humor.

The term könsrock was coined by music journalists to describe the genre after it had existed for a couple of decades, and has in general not been used by the artists themselves.

== Characteristics ==
Könsrock is commonly produced using the same line-up as punk rock, often including post-punk influences with drum machines, keyboards, and other electronic devices. Some bands use heavily distorted instrument similar to extreme punk, and some use a more experimental sound deliberately made to sound unpleasant. The lyrics are usually offensive and deal with topics such as handicapped people, homosexuality, pedophilia, bodily functions, Nazism, drugs, and violence. Könsrock has been popular in schools in Sweden and has on some occasions caused public outrage.

== History ==
Two important earlier influences to könsrock were Johnny Bode, who released three records in the 1960s and 1970s with songs with explicit sexual lyrics, and Eddie Meduza, also known for songs with off-color and often sexual lyrics. As neither worked in a punk rock style, they are not considered part of the könsrock genre proper. Onkel Kånkel and his Kånkelbär, formed in 1979, are often considered to have created the genre.

=== Tunnan och Moroten ===
In 1994 Tunnan och Moroten (The Trashcan and The Carrot) began making music together. Early songs were released as Amiga modules, but since the late 1990s, they have incorporated guitar and drums. In the late 1990s, songs in MP3 format began circulating on the internet, and Bajs i bastun was released in 1998, becoming one of their most famous songs. There are now eight albums. On the later releases, synth, bass, electric guitar, and drums are used, together with influences from chip music.

== Footnotes and sources ==
- some newspaper articles about Onkel Kånkel and könsrock (in Swedish)
- a reportage about könsrock in swedish radio (in Swedish)
