= Gunnar Ljungstedt =

Swedish musician (born 1952)

- Born: 1952 (age 73–74)
- Origin: Sweden
- Genres: Rock
- Occupation: Musician
- Instrument: Drums
- Labels: Audite; Beat Butchers
- Formerly of: Ebba Grön; Imperiet

Gunnar "Gurra" Ljungstedt (born 1952) was the drummer in the Swedish punk rock band Ebba Grön and later in Imperiet. He was approximately 5 years older than the other members of the band, and a friend of Joakim Thåström's big brother.
