= Johnny Bode =

Swedish singer and convicted fraudster (1912–1983)

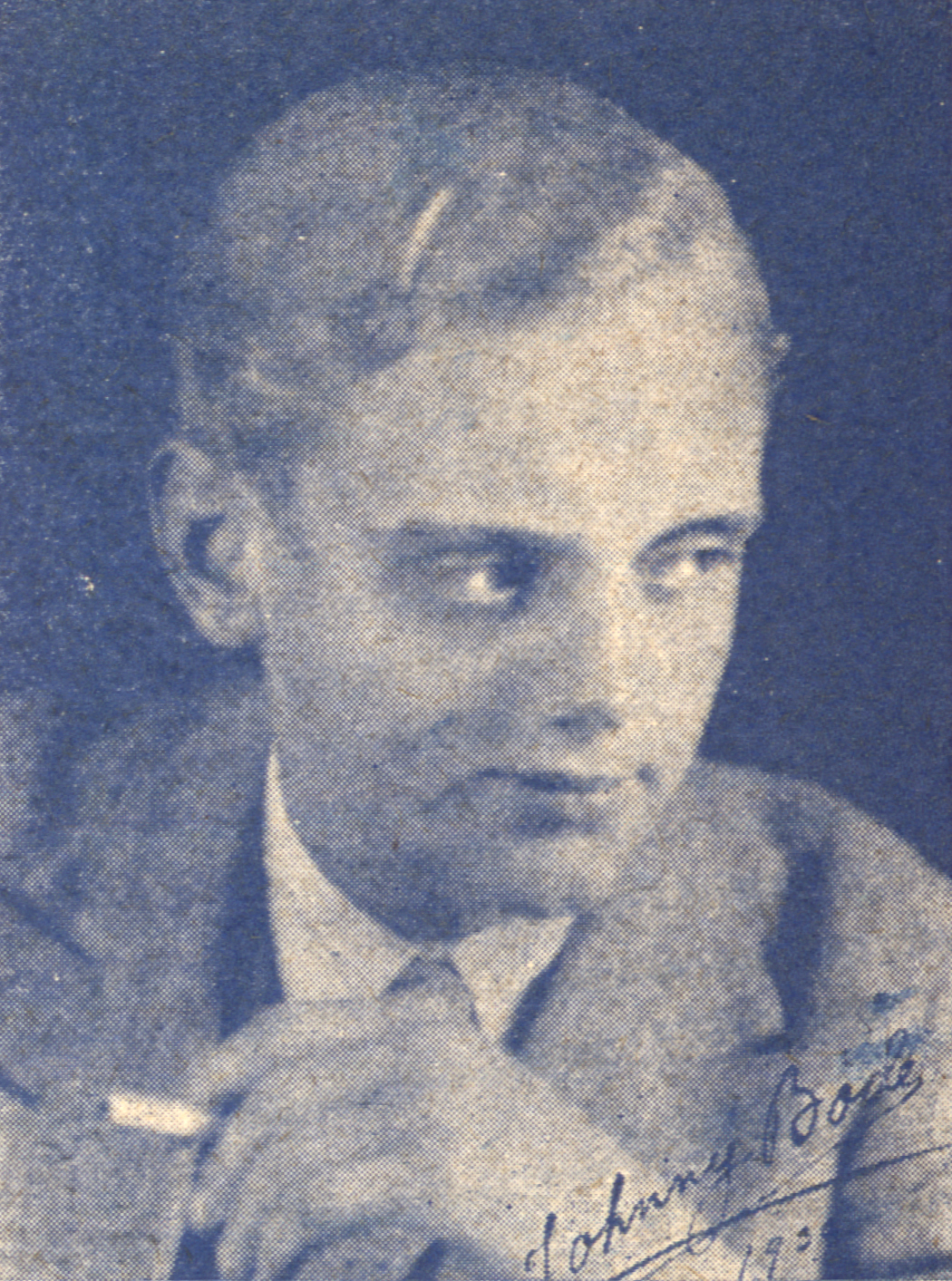
- Bode c. 1931

Background information
- Born: 6 January 1912; Falköping, Sweden
- Died: 25 July 1983 (aged 71) Malmö, Sweden
- Genres: popular music
- Occupations: Composer, singer

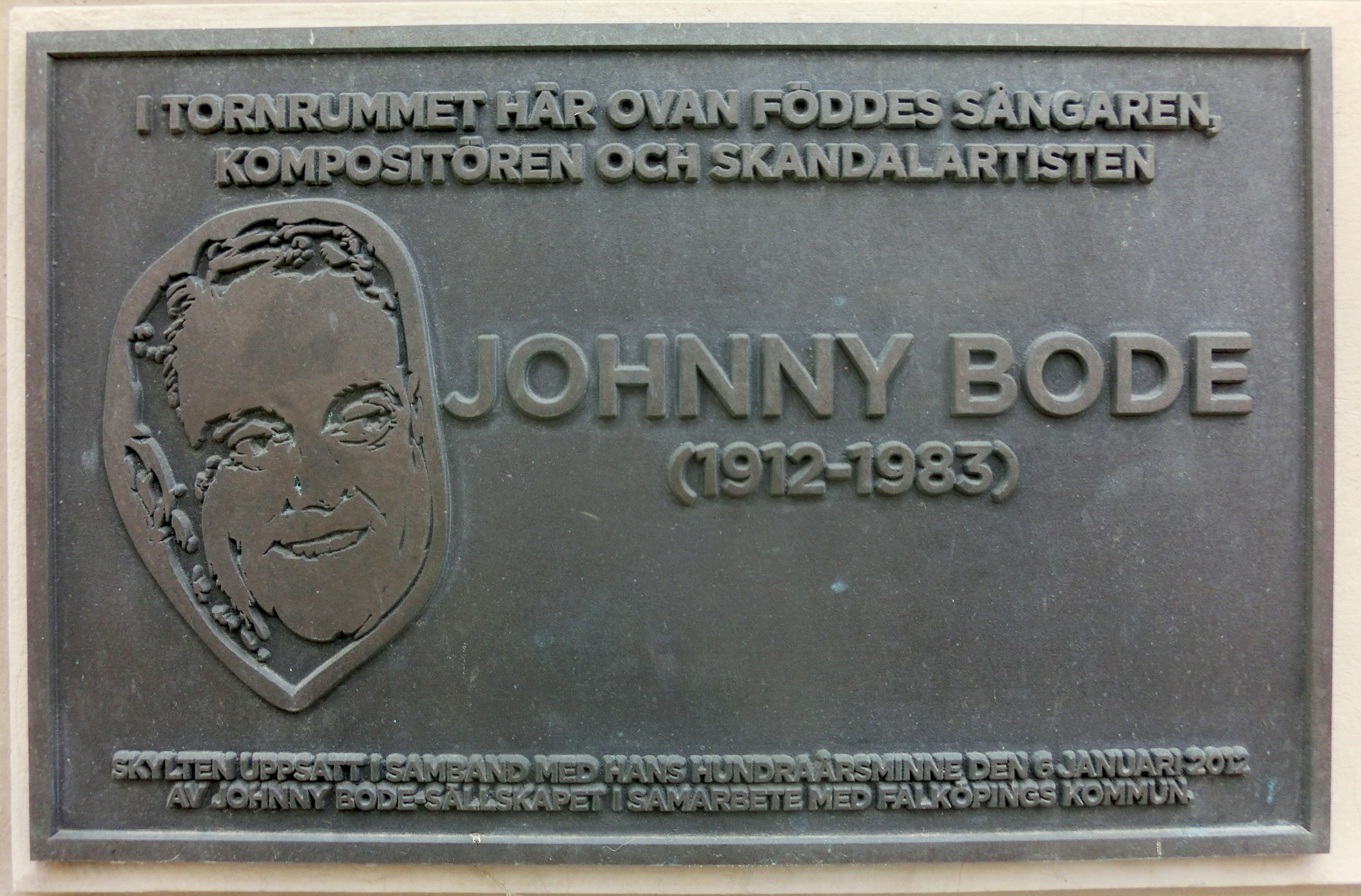
Plaque in Bode's birthplace Falköping

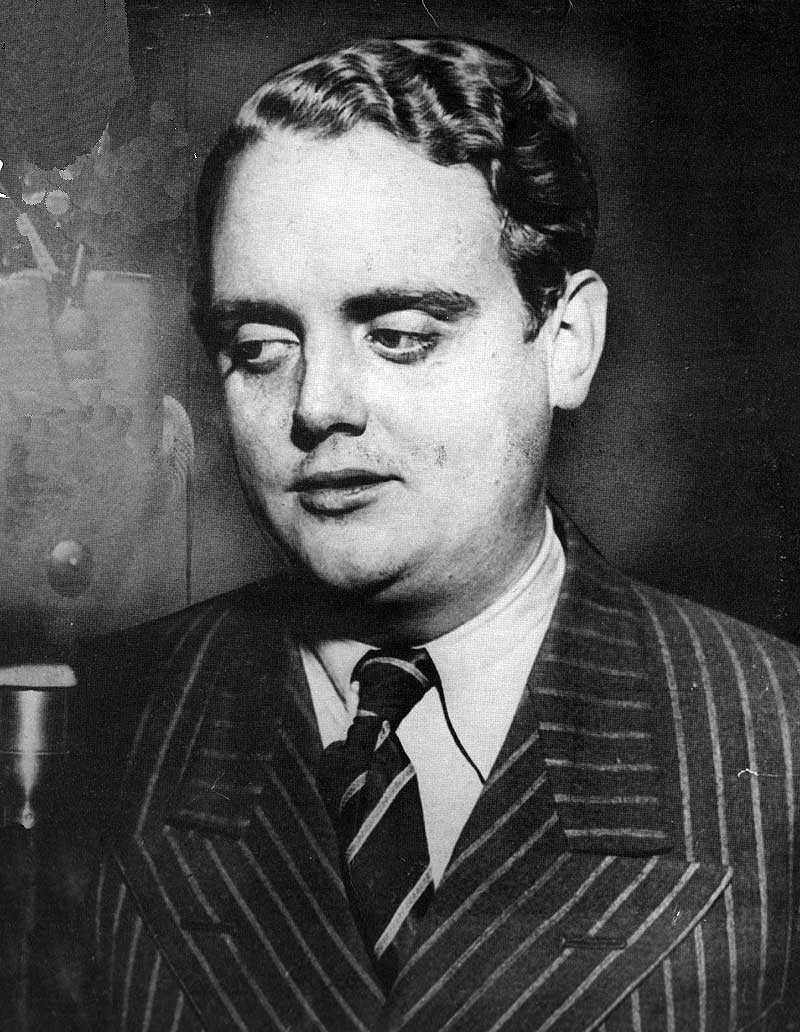
Bode c. 1935

Johnny Bode (6 January 1912 – 25 July 1983) was a Swedish singer and composer and convicted fraudster. Bode had a turbulent career, and was at one point sent to a mental hospital. He published compositions under several different names.

== Biography ==
=== Music career ===
Bode was 17 years old when his first phonograph recording was released, and he proceeded to record hundreds of songs on 78-rpm records, many of which were his own compositions. One of his best-known songs, "En herre i frack"(A gentleman in a tailcoat), was recorded by Swedish actor and singer Gösta Ekman in 1935. The song later became popularized by Swedish singer Jan Malmsjö, who added it to his repertoire.

The last gramophone record featuring Johnny Bode as a singer was recorded in 1942.

Bode was known for failing to pay his debts and was blacklisted from several Stockholm restaurants. Through his school friend Hasse Ekman, he became friends with Hasse's father Gösta Ekman. He became one of Bode's most influential supporters, until Ekman discovered that Bode had forged his name on a cheque. As a result, Ekman cut ties with Bode entirely.

After being convicted of fraud, Bode was declared mentally unstable and committed to St. Sigfrid mental hospital in Växjö, where he was sterilized.

Bode's interest in Nazism in the early 1940s led to him being blacklisted from Swedish show business for the rest of his life.

=== Connection to Nazi Party ===
During his stay at St. Sigfrid, Bode obtained permission to travel to Finland, where he enlisted with the Nazis. However, due to Bode's physical status and general unreliability he was sent home with an under-officer degree from the Nazi army.

By the time he returned to Sweden in 1942, resistance to Nazism was stronger than ever. On the occasion of Swedish actor Karl Gerhard's 100th performance of his Nazi-critical cabaret act "Tingel-tangel", Bode showed up in his Nazi uniform with his degrees on his shoulders and the Iron Cross visible on his chest. After this, he frequently wore the uniform on his occasional visits to Stockholm's nightclubs. As a result, he was ignored by his peers and blacklisted in the Swedish entertainment industry.

Shortly after this, Bode traveled to Oslo, Norway, where he put up a cabaret for the Norwegian Quisling regime. Some of the songs he wrote during this period were mistaken by Swedes as being Swedish. Bode found it difficult to find actors who would risk performing in his cabaret. Bode himself sang couplets and imitated Winston Churchill. After about twenty appearances, the show closed due to a lack of audience.

In late 1942, Bode was imprisoned in the Grini concentration camp after claiming to be a spy for the Swedish government, but his mythomania was so widely known that he was not taken seriously and he was sent back to Sweden.

=== Time in East Germany and Austria ===
At the end of 1951, Bode travelled to the German Democratic Republic (GDR), where he attempted to earn money exporting cinema movie rights to Sweden. He declared himself at a press conference at the Hotel Newa in East Berlin in 1953 to be "a friend of the German Democratic Republic" but was soon expelled from the country. He continued to travel extensively, causing him to go bankrupt in October 1953.

After recovering in Sweden, he relocated to Brussels. When the Ministry of Foreign Affairs requested that the Belgian authorities extradite him, he moved once again, this time to Vienna. The Vienna Opera House was struggling and in need of new talent, so Bode, under the pseudonym Juan Delgada, stepped in. There, he composed the operas Nette Leute, Liebe in Tirol and 12 Bildern (1959), Die Kluge Wienerin (1961), and Keine Zeit für Liebe. These works were met with great success and were performed worldwide for many years. His rising fame eventually attracted the attention of the Swedish police, who eventually tracked him down. In 1955, he returned to Sweden to serve a prison sentence.

After returning to Austria, Bode married 22-year-old Inge Pelz, in 1957. In Austria, Bode's professional success continued, but his behavior grew more and more unstable. He called himself Kammersänger, an honorary title he had not received. At a press conference in Vienna, he stated that he, using a pseudonym, wrote The Blue Danube (actually written by Johann Strauss II nearly one hundred years earlier). In 1961, his young wife demanded a divorce. Bode responded by initiating a bizarre custody dispute concerning the couple's dachshund; he won, and was allowed to visit the dog every Sunday. Bode's reputation abroad eventually deteriorated, and he left the country in late 1961. He used his fake Kammersänger title, which he claimed to have been given "by Joseph Goebbels in the presence of Prime Minister Quisling", if anyone questioned it.

=== Later career ===
In the late 1960s and early 1970s, Bode recorded several comedic pornographic albums, including Bordellmammans visor (The brothel madam's songs), Bordellmammans dotter (The brothel madam's daughter), and Sex-revyn Stig på (The sex revue Step inside). Under the alias Johnny Delgada, he also released a gay-themed single in both Swedish and German, featuring the songs "Vi är inte som andra, vi" (We, we're not like the others) and "Achilles klagan" (The lamentations of Achilles").

== Legacy ==
Johnny Bode-sällskapet yearly awards a prize, Johnny Bode-priset, to a Swede that has acted in the spirit of Bode. The prize consists of a diploma and prize money already used for a dinner for the jury without the recipient.

== See also ==
- Könsrock
