= Kriminella Gitarrer =

Kriminella Gitarrer (named after New York band The Brats song "Criminal Guitar") was a Swedish punk band, active between 1977 and 1979. The first line up was Stry Terrarie, vocals, Mats P, guitar, Affe, bass and Sticky Bomb, drums. The second line up, without Stry, had Mats P on both vocals and guitar.

The band's first single "Vårdad Klädsel/Förbjudna Ljud" (1978) is considered to be the first Swedish punk single.

== Discography ==
- Vårdad Klädsel/Förbjudna Ljud (single, 1978)
- Silvias Unge/Hitlers Barn (single, 1978)
- 36 Patroner/Svetsad (single, 1979)
- Förbjudna ljud med Kriminella Gitarrer (CD, 2003)

Kriminella Gitarrer also had the songs "Knugen Skuk" and "Stig Bomb" on the compilation album "Svensk Pop" (1979).
