= Stig Vig =

Swedish singer

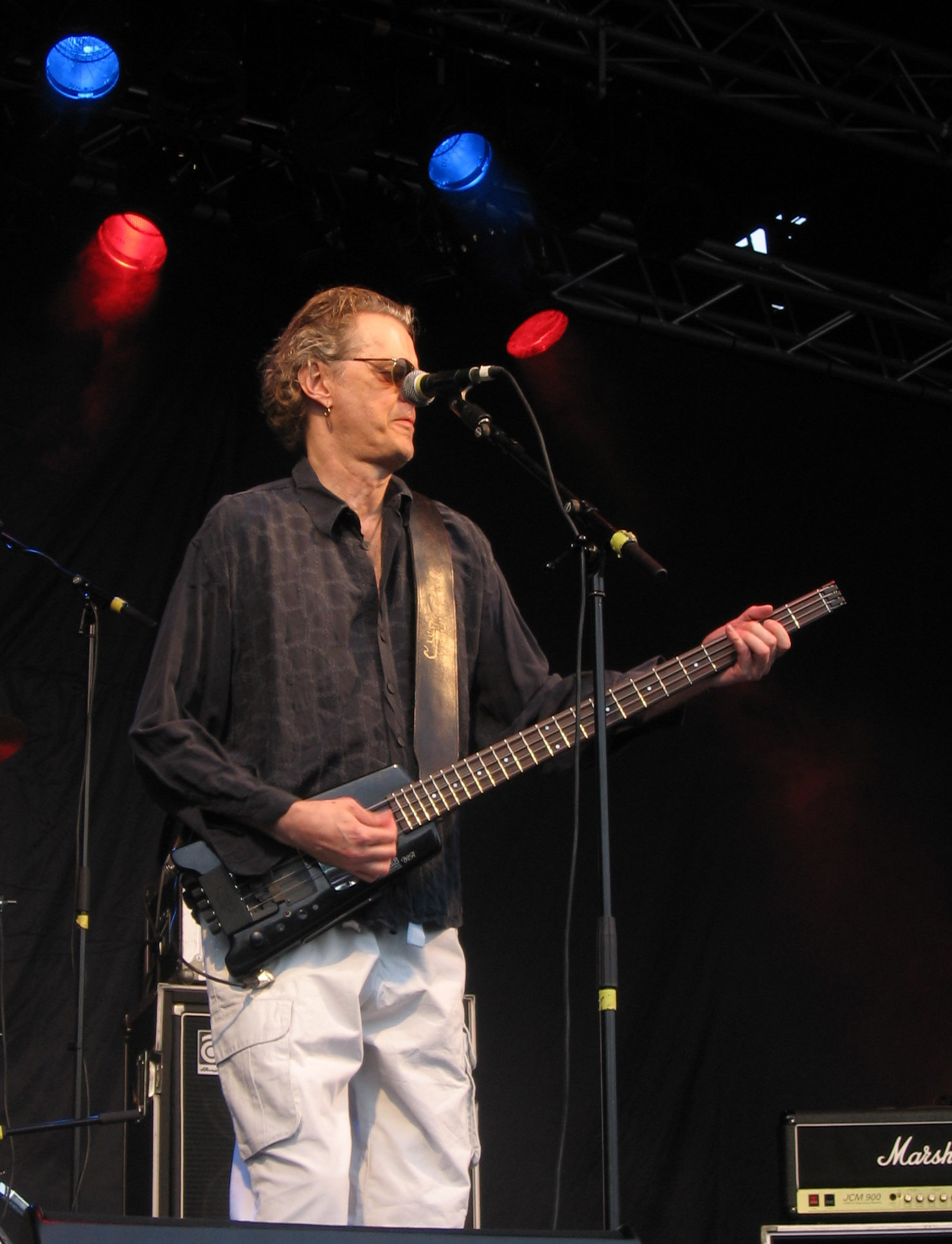

Background information
- Born: 19 November 1948
- Died: 23 January 2012 (aged 63)
- Instruments: vocals; bass
- Formerly of: Dag Vag

Per Odeltorp, known as Stig Vig, (19 November 1948 – 23 January 2012) was a Swedish singer and bassist well known for being the leader of the rock band Dag Vag.

Vig died at his home in Stockholm at the age of 63 on January 23, 2012.
