= Sällskapet (band) =

Swedish rock band

- Origin: Sweden
- Genres: Industrial rock, post-industrial, electronic rock, electro-industrial, dark ambient, minimal wave
- Years active: 2003 to present
- Labels: Universal, Dust Music
- Members: Joakim Thåström; Pelle Ossler; Niklas Hellberg

Sällskapet is a Swedish rock band formed by Pelle Ossler, Joakim Thåström and Niklas Hellberg.

== History ==
Sällskapet is a Swedish electronic post-industrial rock band that appeared in 2007 and is headed by the rock legend Thåström. Other band members include Pelle Ossler and Niklas Hellberg. The band existed as a secret hobby band for three years before appearing publicly in 2007 with the release of their first, self-titled, album. The album contained ten songs and a bonus DVD with music videos for five songs and the bonus track "Nattportiern". Sällskapets music is described as industrial, dystopian and with Kraftwerk influences. Jan Gradvall of Dagens Industri described it as what blues would have sounded like if it would have its roots in Ruhr instead of Memphis. Half the songs are completely instrumental.

On 10 April 2013, the band released their new album Nowy Port.

== Band members ==
- Joakim Thåström – lead vocals, guitar
- Niklas Hellberg – keyboards, synthesizers, programming, sound effects, loops, scrap
- Pelle Ossler – electric guitar, acoustic guitar, piano

== Discography ==
=== Albums ===
Year	Album	Peak positions
Year	Album	SWE
2007	Sällskapet	—
2013	Nowy port	6
2018	Disparition	43

=== Singles ===
Year	Singles	Peak positions	Album
Year	Singles	SWE	Album
2007	"Nordlicht"	—	Sällskapet
