= Tiggarens tal =

Studio album by Imperiet
- Released: 1988
- Length: 46:46

Imperiet chronology
Imperiet (1988)	Tiggarens tal (1988)	Live/Studio (1988)

Tiggarens tal is an album by Imperiet, released in 1988. It was the band's last album. On the year of its release it placed fourth on the Swedish Top Album Chart for a week.

== Track listing ==
No.	Title	Length
1.	"Jag är en idiot"	4:47
2.	"Du är religion"	4:00
3.	"Party"	5:06
4.	"Kanonsång"	2:21
5.	"Ballad om en amerikansk officer"	5:09
6.	"Som eld"	4:09
7.	"I hennes sovrum"	2:44
8.	"Kung av jidder"	4:28
9.	"Tiggarens tal"	3:34
10.	"Erotisk politik"	3:25
11.	"När vodkan gjort oss vackra"	3:12
12.	"I hennes sovrum" (Electric version)	3:51
Total length:		46:46
