= Synd =

Studio album by Imperiet
- Released: 1986
- Length: 40:11

Imperiet chronology
2:a augusti 1985 (1985)	Synd (1986)	Imperiet (1988)

Synd is an album by Imperiet, released in 1986.

== Track listing ==
1. "Österns röda ros" – 4:34
2. "Cosmopolite" – 4:11
3. "Dum-dum-dollar-djungel" – 3:43
4. "Saker som hon gör" – 5:39
5. "Vykort" – 1:22
6. "Tennsoldat och eldvakt" – 4:16
7. "Bibel" – 7:48
8. "Offret" – 4:53
9. "Innan himlen faller ner" – 3:45
