= Anders Sjöholm =

- Born: 1957; Ängelholm, Sweden
- Formerly of: Kriminella Gitarrer, Garbochock, Ebba Grön & Imperiet

Anders Sjöholm (born 1957), with the stage name Stry Terrarie, Stry Kanarie or simply Stry, is a Swedish musician from Skåne. He has been a member of many bands (Kriminella Gitarrer, Garbochock, Ebba Grön & Imperiet), usually as the lead singer.

Stry was born in Ängelholm and grew up in southern Sweden. In 1963, when he was 6 years old, his family moved to Liberia in western Africa, where his father had gotten a job working for SIDA, Swedish International Development Cooperation Agency. They moved back to Sweden in 1966.

In the early 1970s, Stry's interest in music grew rapidly. He bought his first guitar and played in a small band called Riot.

In the summer of 1976, Stry went to London with his girlfriend at the time. There he saw the Sex Pistols. When he returned to Sweden, inspired by the Sex Pistols, he formed the punk rock band Kriminella Gitarrer (Criminal Guitars). They recorded a couple of songs and received some attention.

At this time Stry was conscripted to do military service, and after that he moved to Malmö City where he formed the band Besökarna (the Visitors). The band got some attention, but in 1979 Stry formed the band Garbochock which was much more successful. In the spring of 1980, Garbochock's first and only album was released.

Soon after this, Stry was invited to move to Stockholm and joined the punk rock band Ebba Grön, which was the most famous and successful Swedish rock band at the time. Stry took his notebook with 100 songs and joined Ebba Grön. He would have a great influence on the band's third and last album, simply named Ebba Grön. He had already written a song called Stockholms pärlor (Stockholm's Pearls) for Ebba Gröns second album Kärlek och uppror.

When Ebba Grön broke up in 1983, Stry joined the band's lead singer Thåström in forming the new rock band Rymdimperiet, later renamed Imperiet. Imperiet, inspired by synth and the new sounds of the 1980s and still inheriting a lot of the punk sound from Ebba Grön, became one of Sweden's most popular and successful bands at that time. But after only one year with Imperiet, Stry decided to leave the band and moved back to Malmö.

He now formed the more modest rock band Babylon Blues which released three albums.

In 1987 Stry became father to a son named Kalle, but he also lost his own father who died of lung cancer.

In 1991, Stry released his first solo album called Plastålekrik. Since then he has recorded a couple more solo albums, some with songs in English.

He usually recycled many of his own songs, having used them in different versions with different bands.

Although Stry has been the member of so many bands, including two of Sweden's most successful and popular bands ever (Ebba Grön and Imperiet), Stry himself has never achieved any fame. Financially he has been unstable, but he has managed to get by on royalties and occasional petty jobs.
