= Imperiet =

Swedish rock band

- Origin: Stockholm, Sweden
- Genres: Post-punk, new wave, alternative rock
- Years active: 1981–1988
- Labels: Mistlur Records
- Past members: Christian Falk; Joakim Thåström; Per Hägglund; Gunnar Ljungstedt; Stry Terrarie; Fred Asp

Imperiet was a Swedish post-punk band that was founded in 1981 in Stockholm as Rymdimperiet. In the spring of 1983, the band changed its name to Imperiet, and was then active until December 1988.

== History ==
Imperiet started as Rymdimperiet, a side project to the Swedish punk band Ebba Grön, and included three of its members. When Ebba Grön broke up in 1983, Rymdimperiet re-emerged as Imperiet; with Joakim Thåström (lead vocals, guitar), Anders "Stry" Sjöholm (vocals, guitar) and Gunnar "Gurra" Ljungstedt (drums), all three originally from Ebba Grön. They were joined by Christian Falk (bass) and Per Hägglund (sax, keyboards). Stry left in 1984 and Gurra the following year. Gurra was replaced by Fred Asp on the drums. In 1987 Per Hägglund left and Imperiet disbanded in 1988.

Imperiet's sound was inspired by punk, rock and synthpop. Their lyrics were left-wing and anti-imperialist; songs like "C. C. Cowboys", "Alltid rött, alltid rätt" (Always Red, Always Right), and "Var e vargen" (Where's the wolf) were inspired by Russian Communist poet Mayakovsky.

Mainly successful in Sweden and Scandinavia, Imperiet also toured overseas, playing in the United States, Cuba, Central America and South America. In 1988, Imperiet released their only English language album, called Imperiet. It featured translated versions of their old songs. The album had an intensive promotional European tour, but was only popular in Sweden. This put an end to plans for an international career.

Their original name Rymdimperiet (The Galactic Empire, literally "The Space Empire"), was taken from the Star Wars movie The Empire Strikes Back (1980), the Swedish title being Rymdimperiet slår tillbaka.

== Personnel ==
=== Members ===
- Christian Falk – bass, backing vocals (1983–1988; died 2014)
- Joakim Thåström – lead vocals, lead guitar (1983–1988)
- Per Hägglund – synthesizer, saxophone (1983–1987)
- Gunnar Ljungstedt – drums (1983–1985)
- Stry Terrarie – lead vocals, organ, guitar (1983–1984)
- Fred Asp – drums (1985–1988)

=== Line-ups ===
1983–1984	1984–1985	1985–1987	1987–1988
Joakim Thåström – lead vocals, lead guitar; Stry Terrarie – lead vocals, organ, guitar; Christian Falk – bass, backing vocals; Per Hägglund – synthesizer, saxophone; Gunnar Ljungstedt – drums	Joakim Thåström – lead vocals, lead guitar; Christian Falk – bass, backing vocals; Per Hägglund – synthesizer, saxophone; Gunnar Ljungstedt – drums	Joakim Thåström – lead vocals, lead guitar; Christian Falk – bass, backing vocals; Per Hägglund – synthesizer, saxophone; Fred Asp – drums	Joakim Thåström – lead vocals, lead guitar; Christian Falk – bass, backing vocals; Fred Asp – drums

== Discography ==
=== Albums ===
- 1983 – Rasera
- 1984 – Imperiet (Mini-LP)
- 1985 – Blå himlen blues
- 1985 – 2:a augusti 1985 (Live album)
- 1986 – Synd
- 1988 – Imperiet
- 1988 – Tiggarens tal
- 1988 – Live/Studio (Live album/compilation)
- 1990 – Kickar (Compilation)
- 1995 – Greatest Hits (Compilation)
- 2002 – Alltid rött alltid rätt (Compilation)
- 2009 – Silver, guld & misär (Compilation)

=== Singles ===
- 1981 – "Vad pojkar vill ha" (as Rymdimperiet)
- 1982 – "Alltid attack" (as Rymdimperiet)
- 1983 – "Felrättsnettheltfelrättsnett" (as Rymdimperiet)
- 1983 – "Alltid rött alltid rätt"
- 1984 – "Du ska va president"
- 1984 – "Fred"
- 1985 – "Märk hur vår skugga"
- 1985 – "C. C. Cowboys"
- 1986 – "Var e vargen"
- 1986 – "Peace"
- 1986 – "Österns röda ros & Café Cosmopolite"
- 1987 – "Saker som hon gör"
- 1987 – "19hundra80sju"
- 1988 – "Be the President"
- 1988 – "I hennes sovrum"
- 1988 – "...Som eld"
