= Peace, Love & Pitbulls =

Swedish-Dutch industrial rock band

Peace, Love & Pitbulls (1992–1997) was a Swedish/Dutch industrial rock band headed by Joakim Thåström.

Thåström, who became famous in the 1970s and 1980s with his bands Ebba Grön and Imperiet, took a break from Sweden and moved to Amsterdam where he worked on the PLP project. Peace, Love & Pitbulls released three albums, all with songs in English and heavy, experimental rock music.

PLP was musically influenced by the German industrial rock band Einstürzende Neubauten, one of Thåström’s own favorite bands and the Swedish metal band Entombed.

== Discography ==
=== Albums ===
- Peace Love & Pitbulls, 1992 (international version 1993)
- Red Sonic Underwear, 1994
- 3, 1997
- War in my livingroom 92–97 (2007)
