= Eddie Meduza =

Swedish composer and musician (1948–2002)

Background information
- Also known as: Eddie Meduza
- Born: Errol Leonard Norstedt; 17 June 1948; Gothenburg, Sweden
- Died: 17 January 2002 (aged 53) Växjö, Sweden
- Genres: Rockabilly, dansband, punk rock
- Occupations: Singer, musician, songwriter
- Years active: 1973–2001
- Website: eddiemeduza.se

Errol Leonard Norstedt (17 June 1948 – 17 January 2002), better known by his stage name Eddie Meduza, previously known as E. Hitler, was a Swedish composer and musician working mainly in the rockabilly genre.

== Music career ==
=== Themes and behavior ===
Many of Meduza's songs are about alcohol, women and cars, often with obscene lyrics. Some songs are politically oriented, with many aimed against the various Swedish governments in power during his musical career.

One of Meduza's personas was the vulgar E. Hitler. In this guise he generally recorded more offbeat recordings like "E.Hitler skiter" (a recording of his own defecation) and sexually explicit material. The E. Hitler recordings were only available on cassette tape by mail order directly from Meduza. On tour, he urged his audience to drink vodka to become as drunk as he was during his performances, to the tune of his "Mera brännvin" ("More booze").

Meduza also recorded serious rockabilly songs with a distinct 1950s flavour in his own studio, called Studio Ronka (from runka, Swedish for male masturbation similar to English wank). He played most of the instruments himself. He often received negative reviews from the press, notably from Expressen journalist Mats Olsson, to whom Meduza responded by writing songs such as "Kuken står på Mats Olsson" ("Mats Olsson has a hard-on"), "Mats Olsson är en jävla bög" ("Mats Olsson is a fucking fag") and "Mats Olsson runkar kuken" ("Mats Olsson wanks his cock"). He reportedly said that no matter what he did it was never good enough for the critics.

Meduza is also remembered for the first recorded appearance of future hair metal guitarist John Norum (Dokken, UFO, Europe), who played on two of his albums. Norum and Meduza wrote the instrumental song "Boyazont," which appeared on Europe's debut album.

=== Albums ===
Errol Norstedt's first album was Errol, released in 1975 under his real name. This album consists mostly of dansband music, but also includes a humorous song called "Snus-kig Blues" about snus. He began calling himself Eddie Meduza in 1978 with the release of the single "Punkjävlar" ("Punk bastards"). His first album as Eddie Meduza was released in 1979, called Eddie Meduza & Roarin' Cadillacs, mostly consisting of rock and roll and ballads in English. In 1980, Meduza released his next album, Garagetaper, with a front cover parodying the cover of Frank Zappa's 1979 album Joe's Garage. Meduza's breakthrough came in 1981 with the album Gasen I Botten, which includes some of his more well-known songs such as "Mera Brännvin" and "Volvo".

== Alcoholism and death ==
According to Meduza, he developed alcoholism in the early 1980s during periods of intense touring. In 1981, he was convicted of drunk-driving and spent one month in prison. Nevertheless, he continued drinking heavily, and a year after his release, he suffered a nervous breakdown. In 1993 he collapsed on his way to perform at a concert and was diagnosed with ventricular hypertrophy (enlarged heart). He was warned by doctors that he would die if he drank again; he initially made major changes to his lifestyle, stopped drinking and starting to work out. However, in the late 1990s, suffering a worsening depression, he started drinking heavily again, and this caused his health to deteriorate further. On 17 January 2002, Meduza died of a heart attack at his home in Småland in southern Sweden, aged 53. He was cremated and his ashes scattered, in the summer of 2003, outside Rossö in Kosterfjorden, Bohuslän. He was survived by his wife and children.

== Popularity in Mexico ==
Meduza's song "Reaktorn läck i Barsebäck" ("The Reactor Is Leaking in Barsebäck") from the 1980 album Garagetaper has become a popular party song in Mexico, under the title "Himno a la banda".

== Discography ==
=== Albums ===
- 1975 – Errol
- 1979 – Eddie Meduza & Roarin' Cadillacs
- 1980 – Garagetaper
- 1981 – Gasen I Botten
- 1982 – För Jævle Braa!
- 1982 – 21 Värsta!!!
- 1983 – Dåren É Lös
- 1984 – West a Fool Away
- 1985 – Ain't Got No Cadillac
- 1986 – Collection (2 LP)
- 1989 – Dom Dåraktigaste Dumheterna Digitalt (Röven 1)
- 1989 – Dom Dåraktigaste Dumheterna Digitalt (Röven 2)
- 1990 – På Begäran
- 1990 – You Ain't My Friend
- 1991 – Collection (CD)
- 1995 – Harley Davidson
- 1997 – Silver Wheels
- 1998 – Värsting Hits
- 1998 – Eddie Meduzas Bästa
- 1999 – Väg 13
- 1999 – Dance Mix
- 1999 – Alla Tiders Fyllekalas Vol. 1
- 1999 – Alla Tiders Fyllekalas Vol. 2
- 1999 – Alla Tiders Fyllekalas Vol. 3
- 2000 – Alla Tiders Fyllekalas Vol. 4
- 2000 – Alla Tiders Fyllekalas Vol. 5
- 2000 – Alla Tiders Fyllekalas Vol. 6
- 2001 – Scoop
- 2001 – Alla Tiders Fyllekalas Vol. 7
- 2001 – Alla Tiders Fyllekalas Vol. 8
- 2001 – Alla Tiders Fyllekalas Vol. 9
- 2002 – Just Like An Eagle
- 2002 – Alla Tiders Fyllekalas Vol. 10
- 2002 – Alla Tiders Fyllekalas Vol. 11
- 2002 – Alla Tiders Fyllekalas Vol. 12
- 2003 – Live(s)! CD+DVD
- 2003 – 100% Eddie Meduza
- 2003 – Live(s)! CD
- 2004 – Rock'n Rebel
- 2005 – Alla Tiders Fyllekalas Vol. 13
- 2005 – Alla Tiders Fyllekalas Vol. 14
- 2005 – Alla Tiders Fyllekalas Vol. 15
- 2005 – Alla Tiders Fyllekalas Vol. 16
- 2005 – Raggare
- 2006 – Dragspelsrock
- 2006 – Dubbelidioterna
- 2010 – Rockabilly Rebel
- 2014 – En Jävla Massa Hits
- 2014 – Jag Och Min Far (with Anders Norstedt)
- 2016 – The Lost Tape

=== Cassettes ===
- 1976 – E. Hitler & Luftwaffe: Mannen Utan Hjärna
- 1977 – E. Hilter & Luftkaffe Nr. 1
- 1977 – E. Hitler & Luftwaffe Nr. 2
- 1979 – E. Hitler & Luftwaffe Nr. 3 Del 1
- 1979 – E. Hitler & Luftwaffe Nr. 3 Del 2
- 1980 – Greatest Hits
- 1983 – Greatest Hits I
- 1983 – Greatest Hits II
- 1983 – Dubbelidioterna
- 1984 – Eddie Meduza Presenterar Lester C. Garreth
- 1985 – Hej Hitler!
- 1985 – Legal Bootleg (cassette box consisting of "Första Försöken", "Fortsättning Följer", "Mera Material", "Svensktoppsrulle", "Fräckisar" and "Bonnatwist")
- 1986 – Raggare
- 1986 – Collection Del 1
- 1986 – Collection Del 2
- 1987 – Greatest Hits
- 1987 – Jag Blir Aldrig Riktigt Vuxen, Jag!
- 1987 – E. Hitler På Dansrotundan
- 1987 – Börje Lundins Julafton
- 1988 – Radio Ronka 1
- 1988 – Börje Lundins Kräftkalas
- 1988 – Dårarnas Julafton
- 1989 – Idiotlåtar
- 1989 – Dårarnas Midsommarafton
- 1990 – Radio Ronka 2
- 1993 – Jubelidioterna
- 1994 – Eddies Garderob
- 1994 – Kräftkalas Två
- 1995 – Hjärndelirium 2000
- 1996 – Radio Abonnerad
- 1996 – Rockligan
- 1996 – Rätt Sorts Råckenråll
- 1996 – Scanaway
- 1996 – God Jul Era Rövhål
- 1997 – Di Värsta Pärvärsta Scetcherna
- 1997 – Di Värsta Pärvärsta Låtarna
- 1997 – Göran Persson Är En Galt
- 1998 – Compendia Ultima (cassette box, consisting of 11 collection cassettes)

=== Singles ===
- 1975 – Tretton År / Här Hemma
- 1978 – Punkjävlar / Oh What A Cadillac
- 1979 – Yea Yea Yea / Honey B
- 1979 – Såssialdemokraterna / Norwegian Boogie / Roll Over Beethoven
- 1981 – Volvo / 34:an
- 1981 – Gasen I Botten / Mera Brännvin
- 1982 – Han Eller Jag, Vem Ska Du Ha / Tonight
- 1982 – Jätteparty I Kväll / Tonight
- 1982 – Sverige / Stupid Cupid
- 1983 – Fruntimmer Ska En Ha...
- 1983 – Fruntimmer Ska En Ha... / Han Eller Jag, Vem Ska Du Ha?
- 1983 – Jag Vill Ha En Brud Med Stora Bröst / Leader of the Rockers
- 1983 – Jag Vill Ha En Brud Med Stora Pattar / Leader of the Rockers
- 1984 – Sveriges Kompani (Militärpolka) / Dunder Å Snus
- 1984 – Punkar'n Å Raggar'n / Hej På Dig Evert
- 1984 – Fisdisco / California Sun
- 1985 – The Wanderer / It's All Over Now
- 1988 – Småländsk Sommarnatt / Birds And Bees
- 1990 – Sweet Linda Boogie / Heart Don't Be A Fool
- 2015 – Julesång / Ute På Vischan
- 2016 – Midsommarnatt / Mera Brännvin

== See also ==
- Könsrock
- List of Swedes in music
