= Ebba Grön =

Swedish punk band

Background information
- Origin: Stockholm, Rågsved
- Genre: Punk rock
- Years active: December 1977–21 February 1983; 1995, 2003 (temporary reunions)
- Label: Mistlur Records
- Spinoffs: Imperiet
- Members: Joakim Thåström; Gunnar Ljungstedt; Lennart Eriksson; Anders Sjöholm

Ebba Grön was a Swedish punk band formed in Stockholm, Sweden, in 1977. Ebba Grön consisted of Joakim Thåström (lead vocals, guitar), Gunnar Ljungstedt (drums) and Lennart Eriksson (bass guitar, backing vocals). Thåström, Ljungstedt and Eriksson were also known as Pimme, Gurra and Fjodor. After the release of their second album in 1981, they were joined by a fourth member, Anders Sjöholm, also known as Stry Terrarie, on keyboard. The group was disbanded on 21 February 1983.

One of the most famous songs they recorded is a cover version of "Den ena handen vet vad den andra gör" by the Swedish progg band, Blå Tåget. Renamed "Staten och kapitalet", the song expresses an anti-capitalist sentiment about how the state (staten) and the capitalist owned corporations (kapitalet) control and enslave the working classes.

== History ==
During a December 1977 party in Rågsved, a working-class suburb of Stockholm, Thåström, Gurra, and Fjodor formed a band called The Haters. A few days later they changed the name to Ebba Grön after the codeword used by the police in Operation Leo.

One of the first songs performed by Ebba Grön was the controversial Skjut en snut (Shoot a cop), which was never officially recorded. They released their first single Antirock on April 21, 1978. The band bought all the 500 copies themselves and sold them in the streets. After a concert at Långholmsparken, which was recorded by the national radio, they were contacted by the Mistlur record label and offered a contract and to re-release the single.

Ebba Grön started a hectic period of touring all over Sweden, during which they also released two more singles. In 1978, the time had come for their album debut We're Only In It For The Drugs, with songs about the tough, yet boring, lives of young people in working-class suburbs. The anarchist lyrics were very controversial at the time, and the lyrics of Beväpna er (Arm yourselves)—about taking up arms against the government, the bourgeoisie, and the Swedish royal family—could not be printed on the cover. The band also started to get a reputation for troublesome gigs with vandalism and fights. At one gig the band was attacked by Neo-Nazis; Fjodor used his bass to fight them off.

Ebba Grön also covered "White Riot" by The Clash and "Born to Be Wild" by Steppenwolf (which also was recorded in studio) at some of their gigs.

In 1980, Ebba Grön released a single that would become their most famous song, a cover of Blå Tåget's Den ena handen vet vad den andra gör (The One Hand Knows What the Other One is Doing), renamed Staten och kapitalet (The State and the Capital), with anti-capitalist political lyrics. Their second album Kärlek & Uppror (Love and Rebellion) was released the next year, with the focus of the music shifting slightly away from punk. The catchy melodies and Ebba Grön's image as young rebels appealed to both the punk crowd and a wider audience, making the album a big success.

Later that same year the keyboard player Stry was recruited and brought with him new influences. The single Scheisse was released in 1981 parallel with this: Thåström, Gurra, and Stry released a single with the new project Rymdimperiet (The Space Empire), which would later become Imperiet (The Empire).

During the recording of their second album and the tour that followed, the band was followed by Johan Donner, who was making a documentary about the band. Ebba the Movie was released for the big screen in 1982.

Their third album, simply named Ebba Grön, was released in 1982, and the influence of Stry was even more obvious. The band later said they attempted to make a "Rolling Stones-Album"; a cover of the Stones’ Happy was recorded but not included on the album. The album had keyboards and horns, and was more melodic than its predecessors. This was a step away from punk.

When Fjodor ended up in jail for four months for refusing to do his military service it was the beginning of the end for Ebba Grön. But, without Fjodor, the band lived on as Rymdimperiet; they released their first album in 1983, now under the name Imperiet. Musically this album continued the development away from punk rock. But Rasera (Destroy), the first Imperiet album, is sometimes considered the last Ebba Grön album. Imperiet got a good start and would be the leading band of the Swedish rock scene throughout the 1980s.

In 2003, shortly after the death of Joe Strummer, Mick Jones (guitarist of The Clash) traveled to Sweden to play a tribute for the recently deceased musician with Ebba Grön.

== Discography ==
=== LPs ===
- We're Only in It for the Drugs (1979) No. 21 SWE)
- Kärlek & uppror (1981) No. 5 (SWE)
- Ebba Grön (1982) No. 1 (SWE)

=== EPs and singles ===
- Antirock (Profit/Ung & Sänkt) (1978)
- Prorock (Tyst För Fan/Mona Tumbas Slim Club) (1978)
- Total-Pop (Vad Ska Du Bli?/Häng Gud) (1979) No. 18 SWE)
- Ung & Kåt/Staten & Kapitalet (1980) No. 11 (SWE)
- Scheisse/Tyna bort (1981) No. 3 (SWE)

=== Compilations ===
- Samlade singlar (1983) No. 17 (SWE)
- Ebba Grön 1978-1982 (1993) No. 17 (SWE)
- Ebba Grön Live (1998) No. 4 (SWE)
- Boxen (1998) - 4 CDs with the complete works
- Ebba Grön samlingen (2005) - Double CD No. 14 (SWE)

=== Film ===
- Ebba the Movie (1982)
