= Mistlur Records =

Swedish record label

Mistlur Records is a small record company founded in Sweden in the 1970s. They are now owned by MNW. Among the artists published by Mistlur are Trettioåriga Kriget, Mörbyligan, Ebba Grön, Lena Ekman, Travolta Kids, Calcutta Transfer, Torkel Rasmusson, Diestinct, Raketerna, Lolita Pop, Imperiet, Richard Lloyd, Captain Beefheart, Docenterna and Fläskkvartetten. The label issued records from 1978 to 2010.
