= Monarch (French band) =

French doom metal band

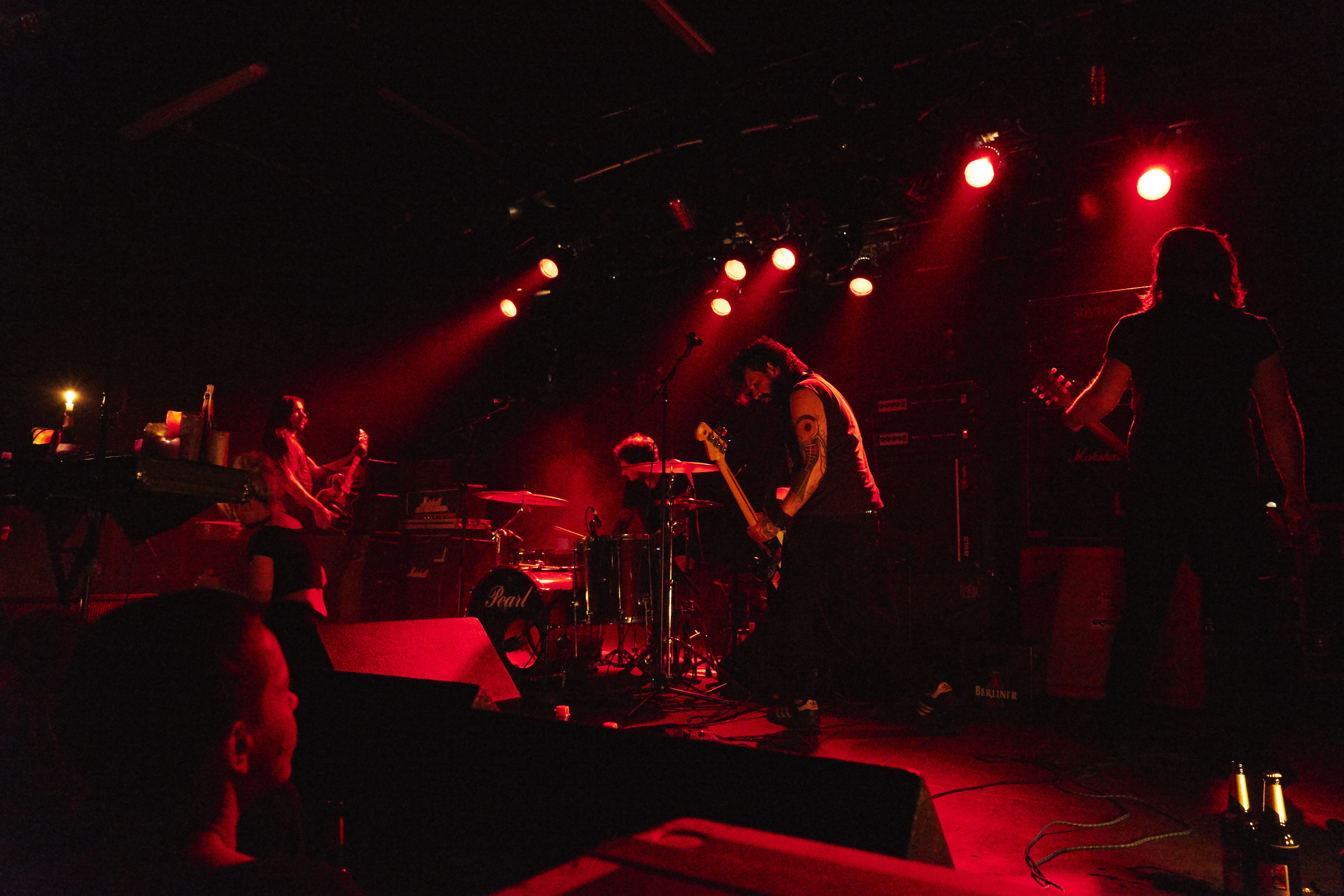
- Monarch! live in Berlin in 2015

Background information
- Origin: Bayonne, France
- Genres: Drone metal; sludge metal
- Years active: 2002−2021
- Labels: Profound Lore; MusicFearSatan
- Past members: Emilie "Eurogirl" Bresson; Shiran Kaïdine; MicHell Bidegain; Boubi Sablon; Stéphane Miollan; Felix Buff; Guillaume Lestage; Stephane Torre-Trueba; Robert Macmanus; Rob Shaffer

Monarch (in the U.S. often stylised Monarch!) was a French doom metal band from Bayonne, formed in 2002.

== History ==
The band were formed in 2002 in Bayonne, France. In 2004, they released their debut, a double CD with three tracks. Since then the band continued to release albums, various EPs, singles and splits with Moss, the Grey Daturas and Elysiüm. Monarch have released with various labels, mainly with the Spanish Throne Records and have signed with US label At A Loss Recordings, which released their album Omens. In the beginning of 2010, Monarch played alongside Wolves in the Throne Room in Australia, and toured North America, Japan and Australia between 2010 and 2011.

Guitarist Shiran Kaïdine died from cancer on 17 April 2026, at the age of 44.

== Music ==
The band states doom metal and sludge metal bands like Noothgrush, Corrupted, Burning Witch and The Melvins as main influences, but emphasizes with the note "but mainly Black Sabbath" the special importance of the classic metal band. Their 2010 album stresses this through its title, Sabbat Noir, French for Black Sabbath. Eduardo Rivadavia from AllMusic sees their sound as similar to drone metal like Khanate and Rigor Sardonicous, but often harsher. British magazine Rock-A-Rolla considers the band to be rooted in modern doom metal. Monarch have also shown appreciation and claim to be influenced by Norwegian black metal band Darkthrone, and several D-beat bands such as Discharge, Disclose and Aghast; and covered songs by Turbonegro and Discharge, among others.

=== Concept ===
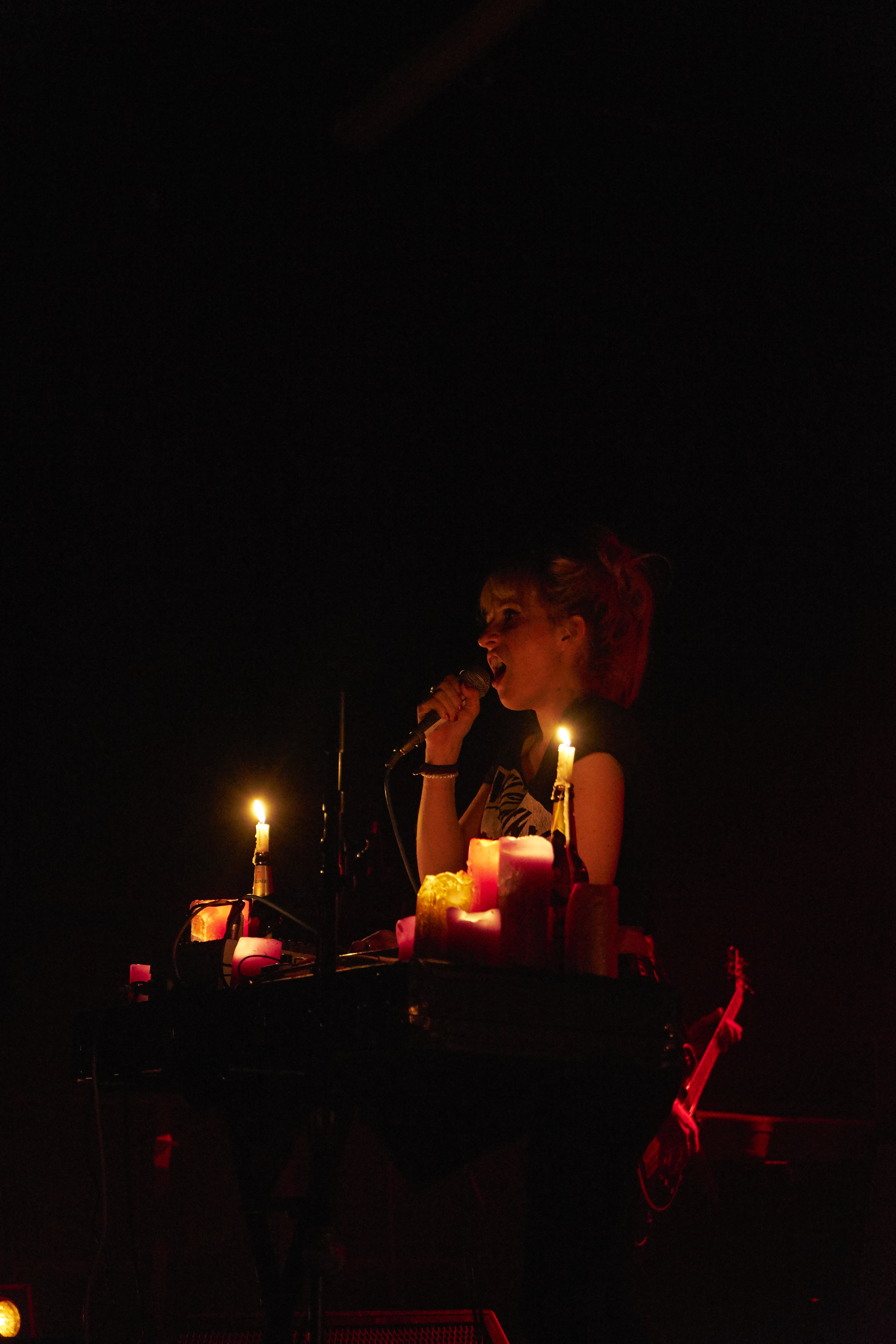
Emilie Bresson, Berlin 2015

Since their founding the band's concept did not change drastically; guitarist Kaïdine described as follows: "The main idea was to play slow and loud as fuck. We were all playing in fast bands so we wanted to play something very different, something new and challenging for us." Monarch tracks are quite long, roundabout 20 minutes, and to date the longest is the song "Amplifire Death March", which is 58:27 minutes long and was released in 2006 as part of a split. The track length caused the band to release albums almost annually for a period.

=== Songwriting ===
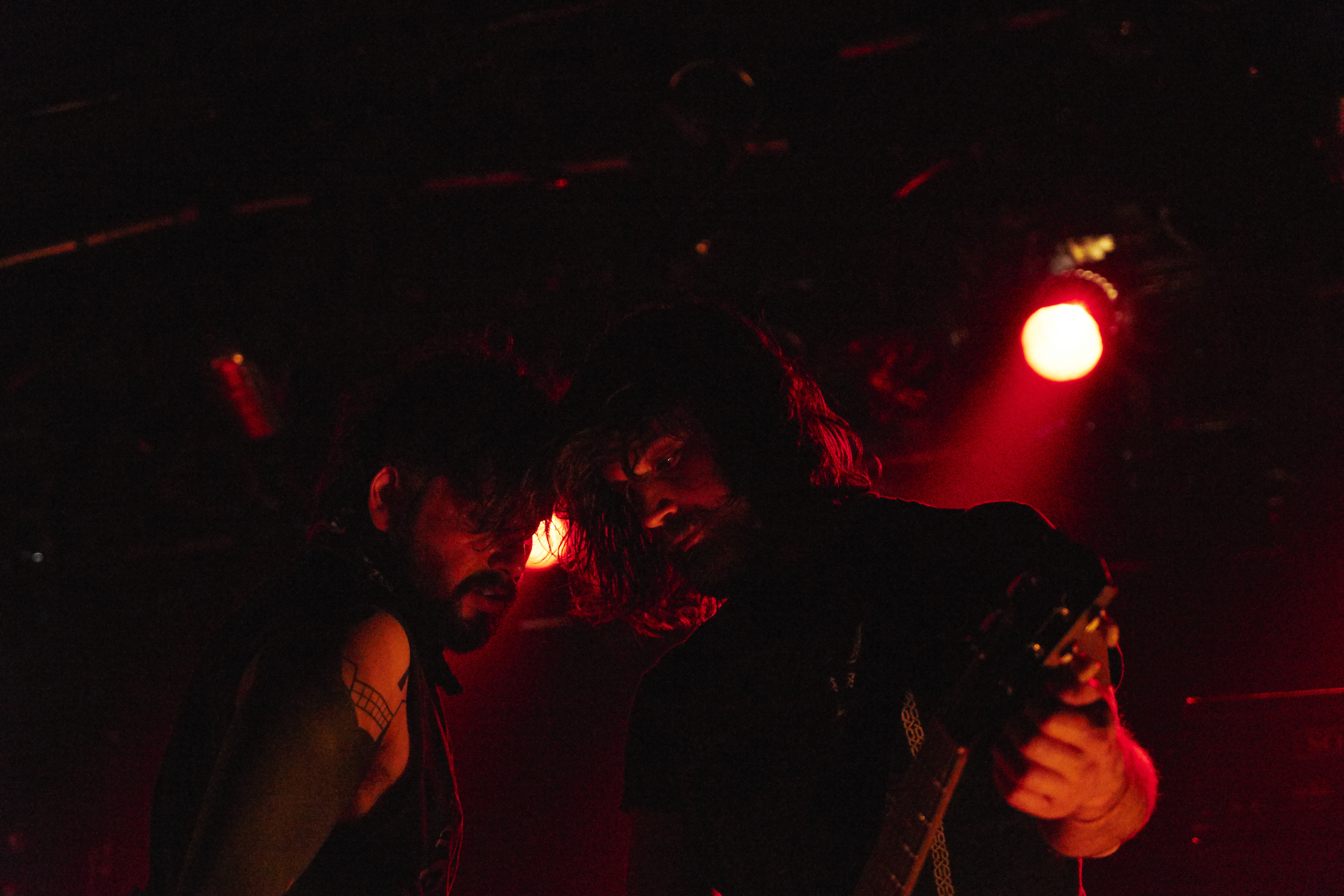
Robert MacManus & MicHell Bidegain, Berlin 2015

Their songwriting is not systematic, leaving room for random events and improvisation. Bassist MicHell stated regarding the amps, "The raw material we work with emanates directly from our amps. […] In that sense there’s actually a physical dimension in our songwriting: seeing how the amps will respond differently according to how we position ourselves in front of them to achieve, for example, a more droning effect, or harsher feedback… So we can’t really write a song unless we’re in front of stacks of loud amps.” The guitarist and bassist use amplifiers by Sovtek, Acoustic, Orange, Hiwatt, Sunn and Marshall plus fuzzboxes. The singer uses delay and reverb pedals.

== Reception ==
After the reissue of Mer Morte, Lords Of Metal called the band a "deep black minimalistic, slow, humongous doom monster". Maelstrom called Monarch 2007 in a review of Dead Men Tell No Tales "soon-to-be doom titans", emphasizing the album to be a challenge for every doom metal fan, though "it's worth it, as Monarch! have some fantastic music".

Reviewing the same album, Heathen Harvest states that it by no means bad, but calls Monarch a copycat of pioneering bands like Boris, Pelican, Isis and Khanate. German metal.de called the 2007 album Speak Of The Sea "meaningless drone tracks, which basic idea almost too obviously and thus bold was stolen from Khanate".

Vampster was impressed 2010 by the album Sabbat Noir and Monarch's "undeviating path to dissolve any music into noise" and states that "neither Switchblade nor Black Shape of Nexus, Corrupted, Black Boned Angel, Nadja or Moss deliver more vehement antimusic than Monarch". Beside the band's extremism the reviewer recognized something new too: "This is what sludge is going to be, when one keeps moving along way outside drone doom, to try something different. […] The fact is neither drone nor doom can be more extreme without turning to pure noise. Monarch pay tribute to Black Sabbath also by making earth shaking music and in trying something new with a lot of courage and a portion of madness not to underrate […]".

Village Voice called a New York concert in November 2010 "a focused, intense performance, utterly lacking the catharsis that's metal's usual stock-in-trade".

== Members ==
Last known line-up

- Emilie "Eurogirl" Bresson – vocals
- Shiran Kaïdine – guitar (died 2026)
- Stéphane Miollan – guitar
- MicHell Bidegain – bass
- Boubi Sablon – drums

Former

- Felix Buff
- Guillaume Lestage
- Stephane Torre-Trueba
- Robert Macmanus
- Rob Shaffer

== Discography ==
Studio albums

- 666 (2005)
- Speak of the Sea (2006)
- Die Tonight (2007)
- Mer Morte (2008)
- Sabbat Noir (2010)
- Omens (2012)
- Sabbracadaver (2014)
- Never Forever (2017)

EPs

- Swan Song (2006)
- A Look at Tomorrow / Mass Destruction (2009)
- Sortilège (2011)
- Sacrifice Your Parents, Satan Wants You To (2015)

Splits

- Elysiüm / Monarch (2006)
- Monarch / Moss (2007)
- Dawn of the Catalyst (2007)
- Birushanah / Monarch (2017)

Compilations

- Dead Men Tell No Tales (2007)
