= Anti Cimex =

Swedish punk band

- Anti Cimex in the 1980s

Background information
- Origin: Gothenburg, Sweden
- Genres: D-beat; crust punk; hardcore punk
- Years active: 1981–1993
- Labels: Distortion; Really Fast; Black Konflik
- Past members: Tomas "Freke" Jonsson; Cliff Lundberg; Robert "Lefty" Jörgensen; Charlie Claeson; Bonni "Bonta" Pontén; Nils "Nillen" Andersson; Joakim "Jocke" Pettersson; Sixten Andersson; Christian "Cutting"; Conrad; Jean-Louis Huhta; Patrik Granath

Anti Cimex (also Anti-Cimex) was a Swedish D-beat band formed in 1981 and based in Skövde, Gothenburg, Linköping and Malmö at different times. They were one of the first bands to define Scandinavian hardcore punk, and their second 7-inch is considered to be a subgenre-defining D-beat record. Scene historian Peter Jandreus described the group as the most famous Swedish punk band of the 1977–1987 era.

Their name is taken from the Swedish pest control company with the same name, Anticimex, the name of this company, in turn, comes from the Latin name of a particular type of bed bug; Cimex.

== History ==
Formed in 1981, the original line-up consisted of Jonsson on bass, Nillen on vocals, Charlie on drums, and Jocke on guitar. Jonsson was, for a time, bassist in the Shitlickers, another early Swedish D-beat band. After rehearsing for a while, they released their first 7-inch EP Anarkist Attack. In 1982 they kicked out Nillen. Jonsson took over the vocals part, and Conrad took over the bass playing. The next 7-inch EP, called Raped Ass, was released in 1983. This work is considered one of the most severe in the history of hardcore. In 1984 they released another 7-inch EP, Victims Of A Bomb Raid. In 1986 they released a mini-LP (12-inch) called Criminal Trap. (This 12-inch is also included as a bonus on the Absolut Country of Sweden CD). At this time Jocke had got tired of the band and they asked Cliff if he wanted to join the band but he declined, and the rest of the band members got tired of the problems and it resulted in the band splitting up.

In 1990 they decided to start the band again after Cliff had agreed to join, and they say that it is thanks to him that they regrouped. They released the comeback album Absolut Country Of Sweden the same year. In 1993 they released a raw live album Made In Sweden. The show was also shot on video but never released. They later released a new live 7-inch single Fucked In Finland and later on they released the album Scandinavian Jawbreaker. After the release of this album the band split up and the members started in other bands such as Driller Killer (Cliff), and Wolfpack (Jonsson).

In 2005 Dead City records released the A Tribute To Anti-Cimex LP, featuring a line-up of D-beat and crust bands from all over the world that were influenced by Anti-Cimex. Notable bands include Disclose (Japan), Wolfbrigade (Sweden), Ratos de Porão (Brazil), Doom (UK), and many more.

== Members ==
=== Final line-up ===
- Tomas "Freke" Jonsson – bass (1981), vocals (1982–1993) (ex-Wolfpack, Moment Maniacs, ex-Shitlickers)
- Cliff Lundberg – guitar (1990–1993) (Driller Killer, Perukers, Moderat Likvidation, Black Uniforms)
- Robert "Lefty" Jörgensen – bass (1991–1993; died) (Driller Killer, Perukers, Black Uniforms)
- Charlie Claeson – drums (1981–1993), bass (1985) (Troublemakers, Driller Killer, Not Enough Hate, Psychotic Youth, The Great German Re-Research, Death Dealers, The Partisans)

=== Past members ===
- Nils "Nillen" Andersson – vocals (1981–1982) (Other bands: DNA)
- Joakim "Jocke" Pettersson – guitar (1981–1986)
- Bonni "Bonta" Pontén – guitar, vocals (1981) (Other bands: Asta Kask)
- Christian "Cutting" – bass (1982; died)
- Sixten Andersson – bass (1984–1985)
- Conrad – bass (1983; 1985–1991)
- Jean-Louis Huhta – drums (1984–1987)
- Patrik Granath – drums (1985) (Other bands: Giftgasattack)

== Discography ==
=== Studio albums ===
- Absolut Country of Sweden (1990, reissued 2000 with bonus tracks)
- Scandinavian Jawbreaker (1993)

=== EPs ===
- Anarkist Attack (1982, recorded December 1981)
- Raped Ass (1983)
- Victims of a Bomb Raid (1984)
- Anti-Cimex (1986)
- Criminal Trap (1986)
- Fucked In Finland (1993)
- Demos 81-85 (2007)

=== Live albums ===
- Made In Sweden (Live, 1993)
- Fucked in Finland (Live, 1993)

=== Compilation appearances ===
- Really Fast; Vol. 1 | LP (Really Fast, 1983)
- Vägra För Helvete | LP (Rosa Honung, 1983)
- Birkagarden | LP (Rosa Honung, 1985)
- I Thrash Therefore I Am | (BCT, 1985 [tape])
- Afflicted Cries in the Darkness of War | LP (New Face, 1986)
- What Are You Doing About That Hole in Your Head | LP (Rot, 1986)
- Eat My Brain, Go Insane | LP (Revoltation, 1995)
- Varning För Punk 3 | CD (Distortion, 1997)
