= Moss (band) =

English doom metal band

- Origin: Southampton, England
- Genres: Doom metal, sludge metal
- Years active: 2001–2015
- Labels: Rise Above, Metal Blade
- Members: Olly Pearson; Dom Finbow; Chris Chantler
- Website: Official website

Moss was a three-piece English doom metal band that formed in 2001. Influenced by H. P. Lovecraft and the occult, songs usually average the 20 minute mark and incorporate dense and otherworldly atmospheres. Despite the use of extreme bass frequencies, Moss features no bass guitarist.

== Biography ==
=== Demo years ===
Formed in Southampton, England, at the end of 2000, the band consists of Olly Pearson (vocals), Dominic Finbow (guitar) and Chris Chantler (drums). Moss self-released several demo recordings during its early years, the first being in 2001, and also appeared on a number of split records and compilation albums with bands such as Wolfmangler, Nadja, Unearthly Trance, Grief and Torture Wheel.

Live performances by the band are rare, the first gig being on a benefit all-dayer during the summer of 2002, with one-off shows in London and Manchester during 2003, bookending the releases of the demos Moss (2001–2003) and Tape of Doom. 2004 saw the most live activity to date; in the summer Moss performed for the first time in Europe at the Ashes to Ashes/Doom to Dust festival over two nights in Ghent, Belgium and Tilburg, the Netherlands. During the winter Moss supported Sunn O))) on a boat, The Thekla. Chantler had temporarily left the band at the start of 2004, first replaced by Andy Semmens of Esoteric, then Jon Wilson, with Chantler to return in December 2004 to join the Cthonic Rites writing and rehearsal sessions.

=== Cthonic Rites ===
On 25 December 2005 the band released its debut album Cthonic Rites on CD via Aurora Borealis Records. Cthonic Rites was produced/recorded in early 2005 at Chuckalumba Studio by Jus Oborn of veteran UK doom metal band Electric Wizard. The first press was available with a live CD-R limited to 115 copies, recorded on 20 August 2005 at the Camden Underworld on the 115th birthday of H. P. Lovecraft.

In March 2007 a split 7-inch single with the French band Monarch was issued on the British doom/psychedelic/punk label Rise Above Records in an edition of 550 copies. On this release, Moss covers the track 'Maimed & Slaughtered' by the British d-beat punk band Discharge. Plans for another split 7-inch, with Japanese d-beaters Disclose, were cancelled with the death of Disclose frontman Kawakami on 5 June. Moss' track 'Crawl (Scrape)' was recorded during the Cthonic Rites sessions and will remain unreleased.

The long delayed expanded vinyl version of Cthonic Rites was released on 12 October 2007 and limited to 1000 copies, 375 of which are a triple vinyl set consisting of the previously self-released extremely limited EP Live Burial. An announcement was also made on the band's official myspace page that their second album will be recorded in January 2008 and released on Rise Above Records. In addition was the announcement of two shows, dubbed the "Slow As Fuck Tour", which were played in December.

=== Sub Templum/Tombs of the Blind Drugged ===
The album title of Sub Templum was announced via the band's Myspace, with a release on Rise Above Records to follow on 26 May 2008. The album was eventually released worldwide in June on CD and LP via Rise Above in Europe and Candlelight in the US. Sub Templum was recorded at Foel Studio, Wales and was again produced by Jus Oborn.

In December 2008 Moss announced via Myspace that they will release an EP of new music in 2009. The title was revealed as Tombs of the Blind Drugged, again recorded at Foel Studio one year after Sub Templum, and was released in June on 10-inch vinyl consisting of two tracks. A CD version was also released on Rise Above and Metal Blade in America, adding as bonus tracks 'Eternal Return' and the Discharge cover 'Maimed and Slaughtered'. Sub Templum and Tombs... saw the band move away from the simplistic tracks of Cthonic Rites, and towards more song-based arrangements and classic doom influences, particularly on the Tombs... title track.

During December 2009 'Eternal Return' was released as a 12-inch single in special packaging, available in three different versions. This was a co-release between Superfi Records and Fuck Yoga.

On 17 April 2010, Moss played the Roadburn Festival at the 013 venue. This show celebrated the band's 10th anniversary. Many bands ended up cancelling their appearances due to the air travel disruption after the 2010 Eyjafjallajökull eruption.

In time for Halloween, Moss joined a short four date European tour with labelmates Electric Wizard, taking in London, Paris, Cologne, and Deventer. A new song, 'Horrible Nights', was performed showcasing again a further progression in the band's sound, with clean sung vocals and faster tempos. Also released on Halloween via Witch Sermon Records and available on the tour in an exclusive version via Buried & Forgotten Productions was the live album Never Say Live - recorded from their Roadburn warm-up show in April at The Borderline in London. Available on cassette only in an edition of 200 copies.

=== Horrible Night ===
In 2012 Moss began recordings for the album Horrible Night, which was released in March 2013 on Rise Above, followed by their first headlining European tour, including appearances at the Roadburn Festival and a headlining appearance at the 2nd annual Heavy Days in Doom Town. This was Moss' final album for Rise Above Records, choosing to not re-sign following the release of Horrible Night.

On 31 October 2014 a 10-inch EP was released, Carmilla (Marcilla)/Spectral Visions self-released via the band's own Stone Tapes imprint and Scottish label At War With False Noise.

== Line-up ==
- Dominic Finbow - guitar (2001–2015)
- Olly Pearson - vocals (2001–2015)
- Chris Chantler - drums (2001 - 2004, 2004 –2015)

== Past members ==
- Ben Ayling - bass (2001)
- Jon Wilson - drums (2004)
- Andy Semmens - drums (2004)

== Discography ==
Year	Title	Type	Label
2001	Demo	Demo	none
2002	The Tormented	Demo	none
2003	Moss	Demo	none
2003	Tape of Doom	Demo	Buried & Forgotten Productions
2003	Of Flesh and Blood	Single (split with Nadja)	Foreshadow Productions
2004	COP	Single (split with Bunkur)	Foreshadow Productions
2004	Thee Bridge ov Madness	EP (split with Torture Wheel)	Nothingness Records
2004	Live Burial	EP	Buried & Forgotten Productions
2005	Protected by the Ejaculation of Wolves	EP (split with Wolfmangler)	Aurora Borealis Records
2005	Underworld Ritual	EP	Aurora Borealis Records
2005	Cthonic Rites	Album	Aurora Borealis Records
2007	Maimed & Slaughtered	Single (split 7-inch with Monarch)	Rise Above Records
2008	Sub Templum	Album	Rise Above Records
2009	Tombs of the Blind Drugged	EP	Rise Above Records
2009	Eternal Return	Single	Superfi Records/Fuck Yoga
2010	Never Say Live	Album	Buried & Forgotten Productions/Witch Sermon
2013	Horrible Night	Album	Metal Blade Records
2014	Carmilla (Marcilla)/Spectral Visions	EP	Stone Tapes

=== Compilation appearances ===
- "Dreams of What Life Could Have Been" CD (Psychedoomelic Records, 2003)
- "Humanless" CD (Humanless, 2003)
- "Chariots Arrive Again II" CD (Foreshadow Productions, 2004)
- "Slowmo Music Vol I" CD (Slowmo Music, 2004)
- "Oaken Throne" CD (Oaken Throne, 2007)
- "Bad Acid Tab6" CD (Bad Acid, 2008)
