= Mob 47 =

Swedish hardcore punk band

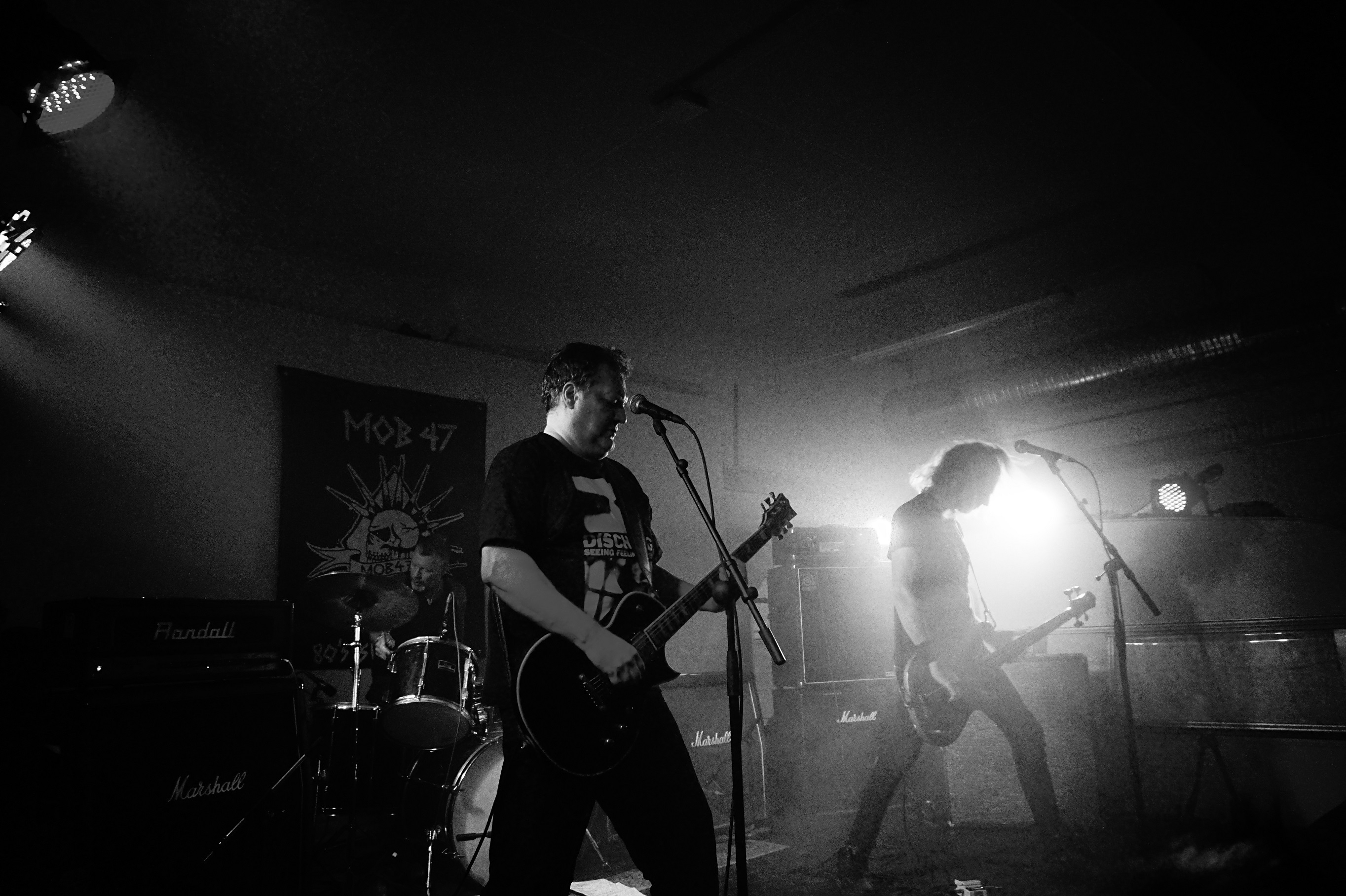
- Mob 47 live in Malmö, August 2019

Background information
- Origin: Stockholm, Sweden
- Genres: D-beat, hardcore punk, crust punk
- Years active: 1982–1987, 2005–present
- Label: Rosa Honung
- Members: Åke; Chrille; Christoffer
- Past members: Johan; Jugga; Mentis; Robban; Tommy; Niclas
- Website: Mob47.se

Mob 47 is a hardcore punk band which formed in Stockholm, Sweden, in 1982, originally under the name of "Censur". In 1983 the band members changed the name to what it's now called, "Mob 47", when singer Mentis entered the band. During their early years they played with the band Anti Cimex. They were influenced by bands such as Discharge, Crucifix, D.R.I., and B.G.K. They have been described as the fastest of the Swedish D-beat groups.

Guitarist and founding member Åke formed several other bands after and around the time of Mob 47. The bands Agoni, Röjers, Discard, Crudity, and Protes Bengt were featured with Mob 47 on the Stockholm's Mangel compilation in 1985. Some with other members of Mob 47, mostly the drummer Chrille. Per, vocalist of contemporary Swedish outfit Bruce Banner, is noted for singing in a number of these bands. Åke has continued to play and released a new Mob 47 demo playing solo with a drum machine in 1998.

In 2003 Speedstate Records in Japan released a two-CD official discography. In 2005 the band began to rehearse again. They did their first official gig in 20 years at Debaser, in Stockholm, 25 May 2006 and are working on some new material.

In September 2007, the band played their first shows outside Sweden, playing in London, Sheffield and Bradford England. In November 2007 Jugga decided to quit the band, and Mob 47 was once again a three-piece band.

== Members ==
- Åke Henriksson - guitar and vocals (1982–1987, 2005–present)
- Christer "Chrille" Lindholm - drums (1982–1987, 2005–present)
- Christoffer Larsson - bass (2017–present)
- Johan Thorsen - bass (2005–2016)
- Jörgen "Jögge" Östgard - vocals (1982–1987, 2005–2007); bass (1982–1987)
- Mentis - vocals (1983–1984)
- Robban - vocals (1985)
- Tommy - vocals (1985–1987)
- Niclas "Nicke" Engwall - bass (1986, studio session only)

== Discography ==
=== Official releases ===
- Hardcore Cassette (1983 Tape)
- Hardcore Attack (1984 Tape)
- Kärnvapen attack (1984 7")
- Sjuk värld (???? Tape)
- Garanterat Mangel (split w/ Protes Bengt) (1995 Cd/Lp)
- Ultimate Attack (2004 2xCd) (released in Japan)
- Back To Attack 1983-1986 (2008 2xCd/2xLp) (a compilation of all recorded material from 1983 to 1986, released in Sweden)
- Dom ljuger igen (2008 7") (Communichaos Media)
- Tills Du Dör (2024 12")

=== Compilations ===
- P.E.A.C.E/War (1984 LP)
- I Thrash, Therefore I Am (BCT, 1985 tape)
- Cleanse the Bacteria (1985 LP)
- Really Fast (volumes 1-3) (1985-1995 LP/CD)
- Eat My Brain Go Insane (1986 LP)
- I've Got an Attitude Problem (1987 7")
- Varning för Punk (1994 3xCD box set)
- Stockholm's Mangel (2000 CD)
- Network of Friends (1996 CD)
