= Damned (album) =

Studio album by Wolfbrigade
- Released: 23 April 2012
- Recorded: October 2011 (Studio Fredman)
- Genre: Crust punk, d-beat, melodic death metal
- Length: 34:48
- Label: Southern Lord, La Familia
- Producer: Fredrik Nordström, Wolfbrigade

Wolfbrigade chronology
Comalive (2008)	Damned (2012)

Damned is a studio album by Swedish hardcore punk band Wolfbrigade, released on 23 April 2012 via Southern Lord Records.

== Reception ==
Professional ratings
Review scores
Source	Rating
Pitchfork Media	7.2/10
About.com	3.5/5 stars

Damned was described by Natalie Zed in About.com as hardcore with a "distinctly metallic flavour", which provided "plenty of satisfying breakdowns and unrelenting aggression paired with beefy, muscular riffs [that] swing between dirty punk, classic hardcore and the odd bit of death metal." Pitchfork's Kim Kelly praised the album as "fast and deadly" and "another worthy addition to their rock-solid catalog". Both Zed and Kelly drew attention to the melodic nature of the band's more experimental track, "Ride the Steel".

== Track listing ==
All tracks are written by Wolfbrigade

No.	Title	Length
1.	"Feed the Flames"	2:11
2.	"Slaves of Induction"	2:13
3.	"Road to Dreams"	3:48
4.	"The Curse of Cain"	2:17
5.	"On Your Knees… In Misery"	1:36
6.	"Ride the Steel"	5:53
7.	"Hurricane Veins"	2:07
8.	"From Beyond"	3:29
9.	"Catch 22"	2:01
10.	"Damned to Madness"	3:27
11.	"Where No One Sleeps"	2:23
12.	"Peace of Mind"	3:23
Total length:		34:48

== Personnel ==
Wolfbrigade

- Micke Dahl - vocals
- Erik Norberg - guitar
- Jocke Rydbjer - guitar
- Johan Erkenvåg - bass
- Dadde Stark - drums

Production

- Peter In De Betou - mastering
- Fredrik Nordström - producer, recording, engineering
- Henrik Udd - recording, engineering
- Fabio "Fabbe" Persegani - cover art
