= Sub Templum =

Studio album by Moss
- Released: May 26, 2008
- Recorded: in 3 days in 2008; Foel Studios, Wales
- Genre: Doom metal
- Length: 74:04
- Label: Rise Above/Candlelight
- Producer: Jus Oborn, Moss

Moss chronology
Chthonic Rites (2005)	Sub Templum (2008)	Tombs of the Blind Drugged (2009)

Professional ratings
Review scores
Source	Rating
Allmusic	2/5 stars

Sub Templum is an album by British doom metal band Moss. Released in 2008, it is their first for Rise Above Records (owned by former Napalm Death and Cathedral vocalist Lee Dorrian) and second overall. It was produced by Electric Wizard guitarist/vocalist Jus Oborn, and it features 4 songs, two of which are over 20 minutes in length (with the longest, "Gate III" being 35:31).

This album saw Moss move away from the partly improvised flow of first album Cthonic Rites and towards more structured pieces, which became even more evident on 2009's following EP Tombs of the Blind Drugged. For his review, allmusic's Greg Prato gave the record 2 stars, saying that "the Moss gentlemen seem to be more interested in seeing how much air they can push out of their maxed-to-ten amplifiers than in songcraft."

== Track listing ==
- All songs written by Moss.

No.	Title	Length
1.	"Ritus"	5:24
2.	"Subterraen"	23:25
3.	"Dragged to the Roots"	9:33
4.	"Gate III: Devils from the Outer Dark": "I. Walpurgis"; "II. The Coming of 13"; "III. Exitus Templum"	35:31
Total length:		74:04

== Liner notes ==
In the liner notes for the album the band give a list of 'visual stimuli', which consists some of what the band watched during the recording process. The list is:

- Death Line
- A Warning to the Curious,
- Last House on Dead End Street
- Alucarda
- Threads
- Horror of Fang Rock
- Death SS: 1977–2007,
- Assault
- Curse of the Claw
- She Killed in Ecstasy
- The Tomb of Ligeia

== Personnel ==
- Olly Pearson - vocals, Hammond Organ
- Dominic Finbow - guitars
- Chris Chantler - drums, percussion

Production

- Jus Oborn - producer
- Moss - producer
- Chris Fielding - engineer
- Shawn Joseph - mastering
