= Moderat Likvidation =

Swedish punk rock group

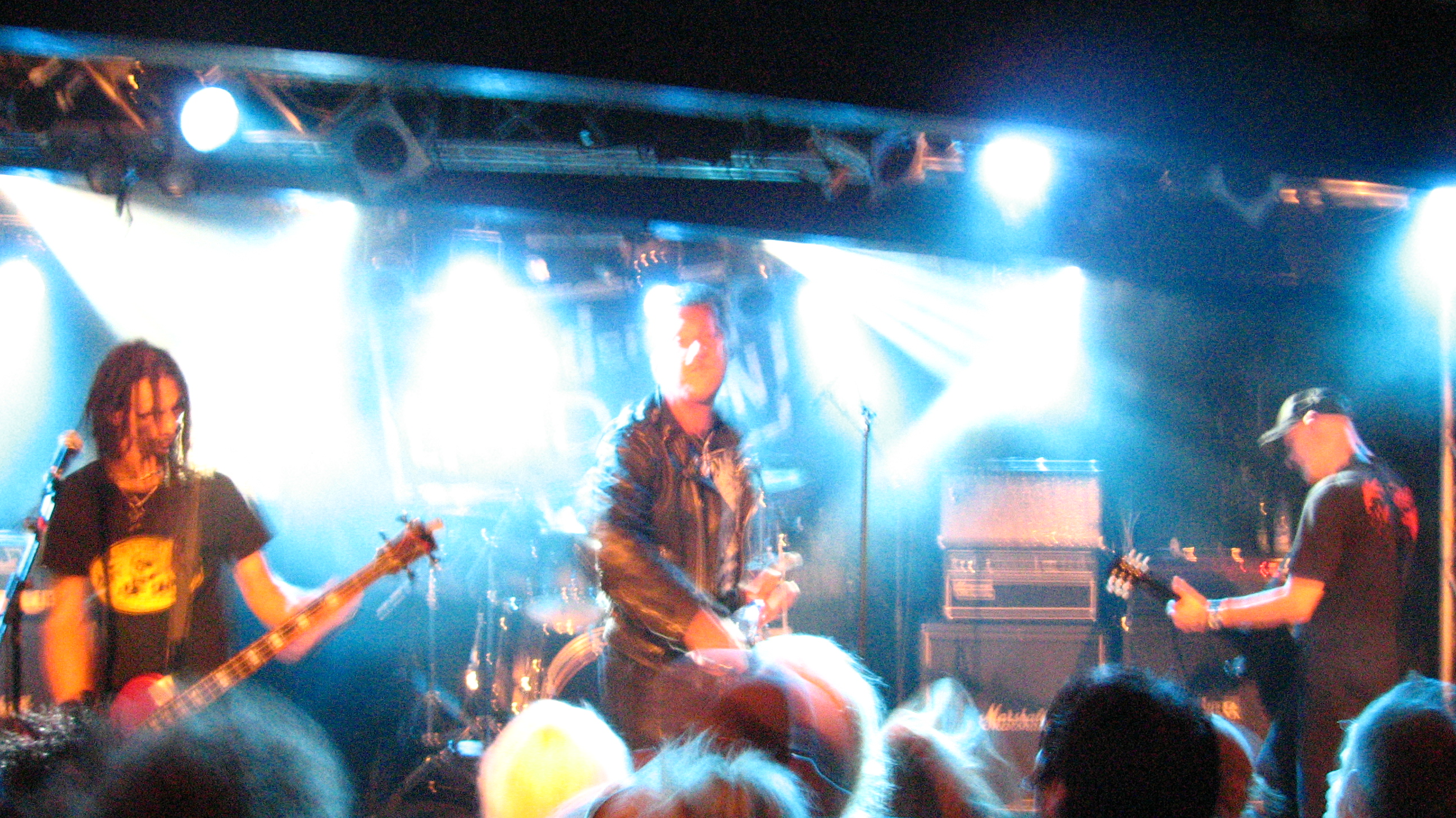
- Moderat likvidation 2008

Background information
- Origin: Malmö, Sweden
- Genres: Hardcore punk, D-beat
- Years active: 1980–1985, 2007–present
- Label: Havoc
- Members: Patrik "Fjalle" Wisemark; David Javue; Per Berglund; Stefan Elfgren
- Past members: Cliff Lundberg; Thomas "Tobbe" Sjöberg; Sami Bannura
- Website: moderatlikvidation.com

Moderat Likvidation (lit. 'Moderate Liquidation') is a Swedish hardcore punk band formed in Malmö in 1980 by guitarist Per Berglund and singer Patrik "Fjalle" Wisemark. The band originally existed between 1980 and 1985, but reunited in 2007. In 2009, the band put out a new full-length album, titled Mammutation.

The word "moderate" in the band name refers to the Swedish conservative Moderate Party.

== Biography ==
In 1982, in the line-up with Stefan Elfgren (drums) and Clifford "Cliff" Lundberg (bass), they made the first recording of the song "Nitad". The band considered that first version a rough demo, but it was this version that got broadcast on Swedish national radio, which led to instant "fame" for the band. The song is also noteworthy as it captures the Swedish D-beat trend in a nutshell. Together with Anti Cimex, Moderat Likvidation was the first Swedish band to pick the beat up, and use it on many of their tracks, although Moderat Likvidation never totally went into the D-beat genre, staring themselves blind at Discharge as many others, but tried to stick to the development of their own sound as well. Nevertheless, "Nitad", when it came, was the fastest, most brutal D-beat song recorded in Sweden, and Europe. It was in Malmö where the notion and expression D-beat first was coined. Before Malmö 1982, no one used the word. This word was in Swedish (D-takt) but it spread, first throughout Sweden and then, transformed into English, all over the world.

After their breakthrough with "Nitad", the band went through a transformation where Fjalle left the band to be replaced by Thomas "Tobbe" Sjöberg on the lead vocals. In this line-up they recorded and commercially released the self-titled 7-inch EP Moderat Likvidation, later commonly referred to as the "Nitad EP", since the first song on the EP was the rerecorded version of the song (even faster it may be added). Together with Tobbe, they also recorded and released the cassette Anti Fag Music (Ägg Tapes, 1983), which led to a lot of discussions and misunderstandings about their political convictions. The title of the release as well as the title song "Anti Fag" has nothing to do with not liking homosexuals. It was just a play with words and something silly and nonsensical to say - hence funny -, which becomes clear to anyone who knows Swedish and reads the lyrics of the song. The song was written in the studio and references Johnny Bodes Bordellmammans visor.

Both these recordings were made in the fall of 1983. But whereas the cassette was released shortly after, the EP had to wait until spring 1984 to be released, due to lack of finances. They had to pay everything themselves, and as they were all unemployed, it took some time for them to raise the money. There weren't any organized raw punk labels around in Sweden at that time so bands had to do it themselves. The EP is therefore released on their own label Kuknacke Records.

In the beginning of summer 1984, the band broke up as a result of inner conflicts and turmoil. By that time, Moderat Likvidation had grown to be a force to be considered, and the name had started travelling the world. Not once did they get the opportunity to play outside of Sweden, but when they broke up they had contacts and plans for a smaller tour in Finland and England and a longer one in Italy. Nothing of that happened, and the members all went off in different directions, hardly keeping contact with each other, one exception being Fjalle and Cliff, who dabbled together in Black Uniforms for a while. Then Fjalle went off to Los Angeles for 15 years and the threads between the former members disintegrated.

In 2006, the band was reunited much thanks to Stefan who got in contact with Fjalle. The former singer was moving back to Sweden and could tell that Moderat Likvidation was a quite acknowledged act "over there". Stefan contacted Per and Cliff and got the first interested, but the latter not.

The practical work of the reunion all took the shape of straightening out some general misunderstandings about what is a bootleg and what is not. Per and Stefan were in personal keeps of the original 1/4-inch master tapes and had been neither consulted nor asked about providing anything to the Distortion Records release "Kuknacke" in 1991. Much to their dismay, no profits had reached them either. The whole thing was foul play, but they also understood that much thanks to the Distortion release their name had lived on to meet a new generation punk rockers. But they felt they really wanted to make the release "their own", so to say, and the sound quality would improve dramatically, making a pressing from the real masters than from a vinyl EP and an ordinary cassette. So they looked around for a suitable label and found many interested ones from around the globe. They settled for Havoc Records (USA) and made a total reissue of their catalogue. This came in the following guise: three different 7-inch EPs: Marionett i Kedjor, Nitad, Köttahuve, first released in a special and limited "boxed" edition with some paraphernalia and the vinyls in three different colors (which led to confusion since the colors got mixed with content so people would have to by the entire suite and swap the records to get it right), followed by an unlimited pressing with the three EPs sold separately and in ordinary black vinyl. After that, it was time for the CD release Never Mind The Bootlegs, which contained all the material compiled together in the chronological order of original recording.

=== Start ===
Despite, or maybe thanks to, the two first line-ups hardly making it beyond the rehearsal room, they were able to bury themselves in hours of practice, and as a result they grew increasingly proficient on their instruments and were able to play faster and harder, slowly drifting away from the punk sound of the seventies and into the eighties, towards a harder, more contemporary sound. Eventually, Per and Fjalle had to make some fundamental changes in the line-up to accomplish this. In 1982, the first “real” line-up was a fact, called Moderat Likvidation Mark I, consisting of Per, Fjalle, Stefan and Cliff.

=== Mark I ===
Now they solidified and produced a recording that would carry the watermark of their typical sound, a sound that eventually would render them international reputation and acclaim – which at the time being couldn’t be further away from their minds; they just struggled to get their act together and considered the recording to be a rough demo. The songs on the 1982 tape found their way onto different compilations, but were initially never put on vinyl. The big turnaround for the band was when the song Nitad was played on the alternative radio show Ny Våg (meaning New Wave) that was broadcast on National Radio all over Sweden. The requests for them started dropping in and a series of chaotic gigs saw to that their reputation grew; they were an exhaustive live act and always up for some good mischief. But along with success came tearings in the band and soon Fjalle departed, being replaced by Tobbe on the vocals. Tobbe, who had had some minor success in a local Malmö punk act called Hjärnsubstans was chaotic and disorderly enough to fit into the band. The year is now 1983 and the Mark II setting is here.

=== Mark II ===
The ambitions in the band had grown and they decided to record a 7-inch EP. It also entailed a rerecording of some of the songs from the 1982 tape ("Nitad, Tio Timmar, Enola Gay") but with slight modifications. Soon after that, in fact they had merely left the studio, the band won a contest announced in a local newspaper, which led them straight into yet another recording situation; the first prize in the contest being a demo recording session with the Malmö Radio’s brand new (and quite impressive) Mobile Recording Unit. The place of recording was set to the old Victoria Theatre in the city center of Malmö and the band set up their gear on the stage with the Mobile Unit van placed outside in the backyard. All the reverb on the recording is the true ambience of the theatre and is not something placed there artificially in the mix, although you could say that a little attention and less sloppiness from the sound engineer could have balanced it better in the mix. Anyhow, the schedule was tight, their allotted time merely three hours, but with the material sufficiently rehearsed they managed to record all the new songs they had – which were 5 – in less than two hours. The band now insisted on recording yet another song and with the spare time on their account they started playing around with different ideas. Everyone contributed. Even Fjalle did, although it was almost a year since his departure from the band. For in Per’s guitar case there was a whole bunch of old lyrics and notes and on one piece of paper they found some really funny pornographic words written by Fjalle. They all had great laughs when completing the lyrics and in the end it was so hilarious that Tobbe had a really hard time containing himself during the vocal takes. Had anyone in that moment told them that the selfsame lyrics, and especially the chorus where Tobbe screamed the nonsensical words “Anti Fag”, was to become a stumbling block to many “politically correct” people they would have fallen on top of each other laughing their asses off. However, after the (double!) recording sessions Moderat Likvidation played a whole bunch of gigs and managed to get the Victoria Theatre tapes released as Anti Fag Music on company Ägg Tapes in Gothenburg at the same time as they had their 7” recording sent to Stockholm for mastering. It was hectic days, but all seemed to be going well in the M.L. camp. However, a few days before Christmas the same year, when they had enjoyed a well-needed break from each other for some weeks, Stefan left the band without any formal warning. Although the atmosphere in the band had always been one of great turmoil and stress – what the hell, where talking about a rock band here - Stefan’s leave from the band came as a big shock to the members, and even worse; it had a devastating consequence for the sound of the band. It would show, it was even worse than that: it was the beginning of the end.

=== End ===
What then followed was first a replacement drummer, Jens, brought in from the wings by Cliff, and when that didn’t seem to work and when both Jens AND Cliff left the band in the spring of 1984 there followed a whole kitchen full of concoctions of members that in no way could live up to the sound of Moderat Likvidation. The punk scene in Malmö was dying: many friends had disappeared, ended up in jail, on drug rehabilitation or become locked up in the hospital's mental wards (either of their own volition or forced by law). The non-conformist heavy way of living was taking its toll on the scene. People were just disappearing and ironically enough it was during these last days of punk in Malmö that Moderat Likvidation released their self entitled EP (Later known as the Nitad EP) and started to reach outside of Sweden. (According to hearsay, tape of Anti Fag Music reached the ears of Dead Kennedys singer Jello Biafra and that he banned Moderat Likvidation for being Nazis because of the lines “Sieg Heil” in the chorus of the anti-Nazi skinhead song “Köttahuve”.) Per and Tobbe, the only true members left, tried to keep the ML-machine going but despite the ever so many gigs, interviews and phone calls coming in from all over Europe, requesting them to come and play their venues, the ML-machine felt less like a band and more and more like giving a corpse artificial respiration. Success or no success the band had had it.

In hindsight, it is amazing that a band with such a short heyday – not more than three years – has been able to produce this acclaimed congruent sound with so many members (12) passing through the ranks. Credits should be given them all, although it forever will be true that the Moderat Likvidation of the 80s should be considered the Mark I and Mark II, the only line-ups that did any recordings because it were the only line-ups that produced anything that made a difference.

== Members ==
=== Current line-up ===
- Patrik "Fjalle" Wisemark - lead vocals (1980-1982; 2007–present)
- David Javue - bass guitar (2008–present)
- Per Berglund - guitar (1980-1985; 2007–present)
- Stefan Elfgren - drums (1980-1985; 2007–present)

=== Former members ===
- Cliff Lundberg - bass guitar (1980-1985)
- Thomas "Tobbe" Sjöberg - vocals (1982-1985)
- Sami Bannura - bass guitar (2007-2008)

== Discography ==
- Kuknacke (1993)
- Nevermind the Bootlegs (2006)
- Mammutation (2009)

=== EPs ===
- Moderat likvidation EP (1983)
- Anti-fag music (1983)
- Nitad (1992)
- Köttahuve (2006)
- Marionett i kedjor (2006)
- Nitad (2006)

=== Compilations ===
- I Thrash, Therefore I Am (BCT, 1985 tape)
