= William Albert Flick =

Australian pest exterminator (1890–1980)

William Albert Flick OBE (14 February 1890 – 10 May 1980) was an Australian bacteriologist, pest exterminator and businessman who, alongside his wife, invented a chemical compound to kill terminates. This allowed them to establish the company W. A. Flick & Co, now known as Flick Pest Control, which is the largest pest control company in Australia.

== Biography ==
Flick was born in Lismore, in the Northern Rivers region of New South Wales, and he grew up on a dairy farm in Ewingsdale. He was the second of eight children and his parents William and Sarah (née Atkin) Flick who, though both Australian born, had French ancestry.

Flick attended school locally and on 3 February 1915, at the age of 25, he married Phyllis Pearl Jamison in Mullumbimby and they settled together on a dairy farm in Tyagarah where they also kept bees. There they began to experiment with various chemical compounds, to rid their property of termites and, inspired by the bees, they began to target the termite-queen. The developed an arsenical compound, which became known as 'Flick' (or Anticimex internationally), which they successfully used and began using on surrounding properties soon after.

The Flicks did not immediately patent their product, however Flick did begin charging for his services and opened a pest exterminating business, known as W. A. Flick & Co, in 1918. This included recruiting others, who they called 'Flickmen' in the cities of Sydney, Brisbane and, later, Perth. In Perth they were hired to treat problems with termites in the underground telegraph cables.

The family moved a number of times in the 1920s due to their daughter's asthma until, in 1928 they settled in Hornsby, a suburb of Sydney, where they remained for much of the remainder of their lives.

In the 1930s the Flicks also began to fumigate cockroaches and bed bugs with cyanide and in 1937 finally patented their processes. Despite their growth, Flick continued to do much of the hands-on work himself and was considered by many as "unsophisticated". It was while he was competing in a woodchopping competition at the Royal Easter Show in the 1930s that their long-term slogan "one flick and they're gone" was coined by a watching sign writer.

The business grew significantly during World War II, as they acquired a number of government contracts in hospitals and barracks. To meet their war contracts, they incorporated and established 15 overseas branches around the Pacific. It was also around this time that Flick launched their retail products.

In 1950 Flick essentially retired from the company, although continued to be involved as the chairman of directors, and handed over its management to his sons.

During retirement the Flicks lived in Newport where he was an active lawn bowls player and involved in Freemasonry. In 1972 he was made an Officer of the Order of the British Empire (OBE).

== Death and legacy ==
Flick was predeceased by his wife Phyllis, who died in 1977. He died at Newport on 10 May 1980.

After his death his family sold the company, now known as Flick Pest Control which is Australia's largest pest control company. In 2013 this company was acquired by Anticimex.
