= Driller Killer (band) =

Swedish crust punk band

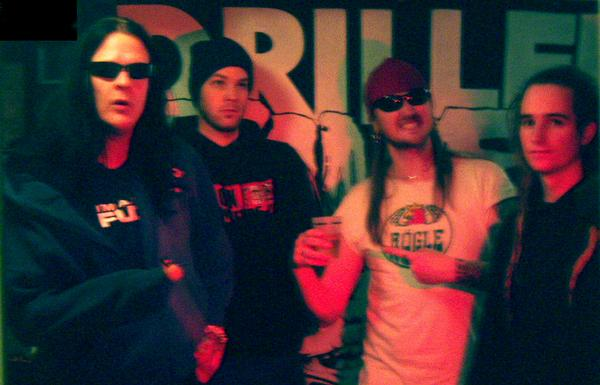

Background information
- Origin: Malmö, Sweden
- Genres: Crust punk; death metal
- Years active: 1993-2009
- Label: Osmose Productions
- Members: Cliff Lundberg; Christoffer Larsson; Johan Gummesson; Charlie Claeson
- Past members: Andy Rydell; Adam Andersson; Svend; Henke; Christer; Selle; Asp; Charlie Claeson

Driller Killer was a Swedish crust punk band. They were formed in 1993 in Malmö and are named after the Abel Ferrara film The Driller Killer. They are signed to the French record label Osmose Productions and have released seven full-length albums, and a variety of split releases to date. Their style has been described as heavy punk, hardcore punk, crust punk and D-beat. They are also strongly influenced by the sound of Discharge.

Driller Killer was one of the first bands to implement death metal sound into a crust punk formula. The popularity of the crust punk and death metal fusion cemented when Osmose Productions created the Kron-H imprint for the main purpose of signing Driller Killer, Disfear, Loud Pipes and Dellamorte. While the tenure with Kron-H did not generate major financial success it gained praise from underground critics.

== Members ==
=== Current line-up ===
- Cliff Lundberg - vocals (1993-2009), guitar (1993-1996)
- Christoffer Larsson - guitar (2009), bass (2005-2009)
- Johan Gummesson - bass (2009)
- Charlie Claeson - drums (2006-2009)

=== Past members ===
- Adam Andersson - guitar (1999-2009)
- Andy Rydell - guitar (1996-1999), bass (1993-1996)
- Robert "Lefty" Jörgensen - bass (1996-1997)
- Svend Ruelökke- bass (1997-1999) (2001-2004)
- Henke - bass (1999-2001)
- Christer - drums (1993-1996)
- Selle - drums (1996-2000)
- Asp - drums (2001-2006)

== Discography ==
- Brutalize (1994) LP/CD
- Total Fucking Hate (1995) LP/CD/PD
- Fuck the World (1997) LP/CD
- Reality Bites (1998) CD
- And the Winner Is… (2000) LP/CD
- Cold, Cheap & Disconnected (2002) LP/CD
- The 4Q Mangrenade (2005) LP/CD

Compilation albums

- A.I.R vol. 1 and 2 (1998)

EPs

- Split w/ Impaled Nazarene (1999)
- Split w/ Extreme Noise Terror (2007) 10"/MCD

Fuck the World and Reality Bites were released on vinyl in 2019.
