= Wolfbrigade =

Swedish crust punk band

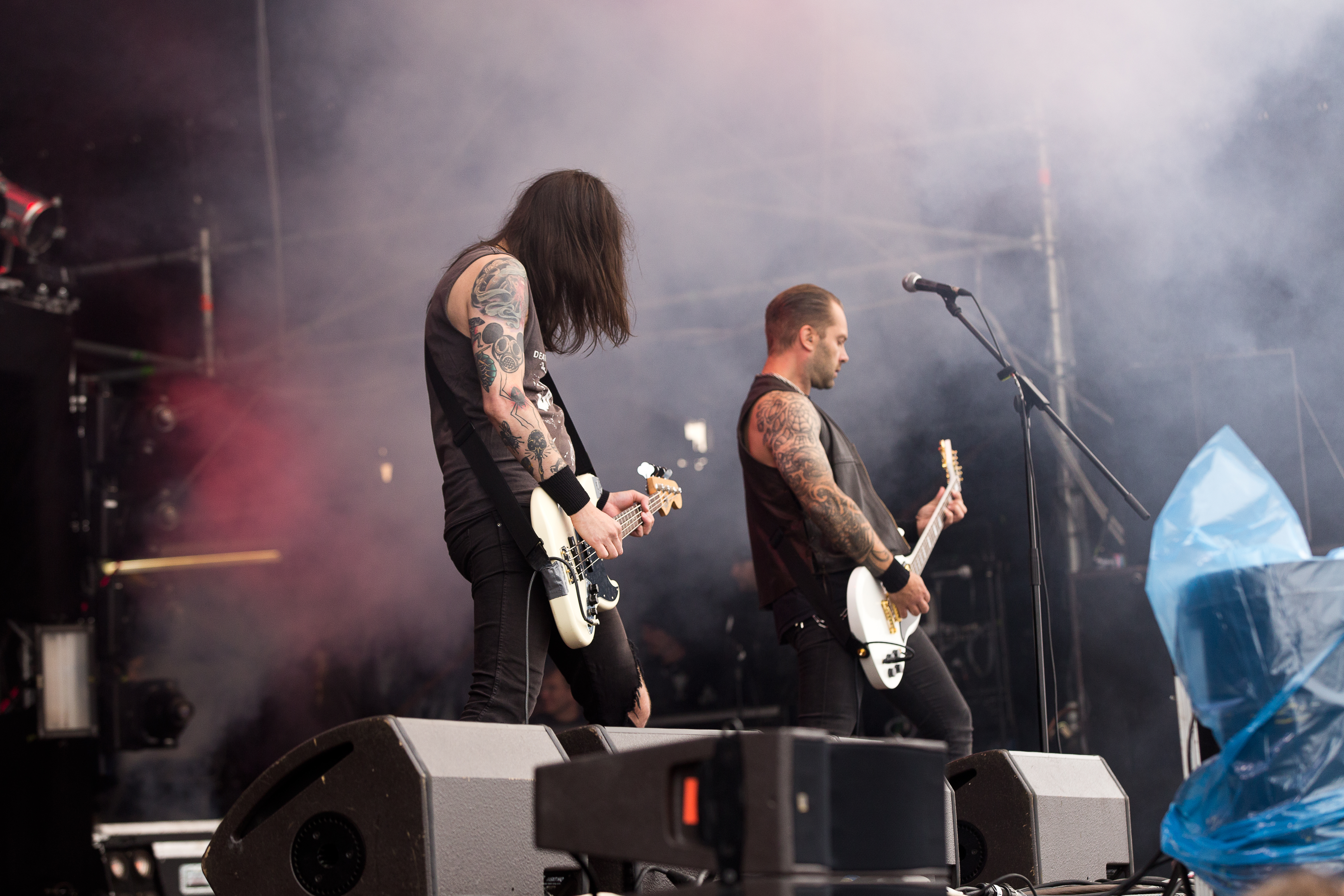
- Wolfbrigade at Party.San Metal Open Air 2016

Background information
- Also known as: Wolfpack, Today's Overdose
- Origin: Sweden
- Genres: Crust punk, melodic death metal
- Years active: 1995–2004, 2006–present
- Labels: Farewell, La Famila, Agipunk, Deranged, Southern Lord, Metal Blade Records, Lycanthro Releases
- Members: Mikael Dahl; Jocke Rydbjer; Erik Norberg; Johan Erkenvåg; Dadde Stark
- Past members: Tommy Storback; Tomas Jonsson; Frank Johansen; Marcus Psykfall

Wolfbrigade (formerly Wolfpack) is a Swedish crust punk band formed in 1995 by Jocke Rydbjer, Erik Norberg, Marcus "M. Psykfall" Johansson, Frank Johansen and the vocalist Tomas Jonsson (known for being part of the local crust punk band Anti Cimex).

== History ==
Wolfbrigade went on a one-year hiatus from playing live in 2011 and then regrouped for the release of Damned in 2012. The record saw the band return to their roots, both musically and production-wise, as they returned to Studio Fredman. With this album the band started to get offers from bigger metal festivals, like Hellfest for example. Pitchfork Media praised the Damned album and described them as combining crust punk and melodic death metal in a manner similar to Disfear.

== Influences ==
The band's earliest influences were Anti Cimex, Strebers, Asta Kask and Puke. Once they took the name Wolfbrigade, they then also embraced the influence of At the Gates, Dirty Rotten Imbeciles, Entombed, Circle Jerks, Napalm Death, Poison Idea and Motörhead.

== Members ==
=== Current line-up ===
- Mikael Dahl – vocals - (1999–present) (Today's Overdose, ex-To What End?)
- Jocke Rydbjer – guitar (1995–present) (Today's Overdose, ex-To What End?, ex-Obscure Infinity, ex-Sunday Morning Einsteins)
- Erik Norberg – guitar (1995–present) (Today's Overdose, ex-Obscure Infinity)
- Johan Erkenvåg – bass (2004–present) (Today's Overdose)
- Dadde Stark – drums (2002–2015, 2024-present) (Today’s Overdose, Asta Kask, Mass Worship, ex- To What End?, ex-Sunday Morning Einsteins, ex-Sju Svåra År)
Wolfbrigade at Party.San 2016

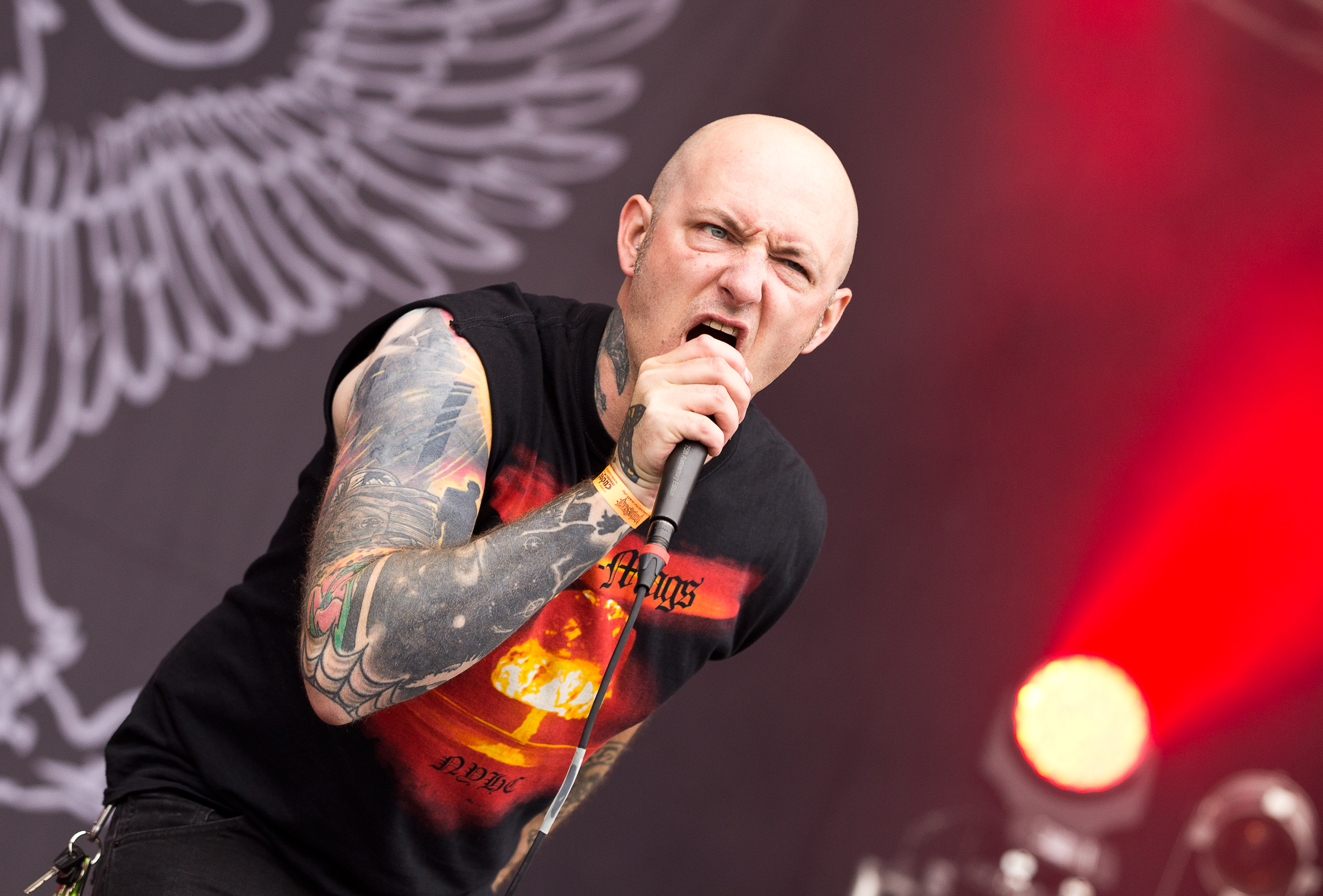
Mikael "Micke" Dahl

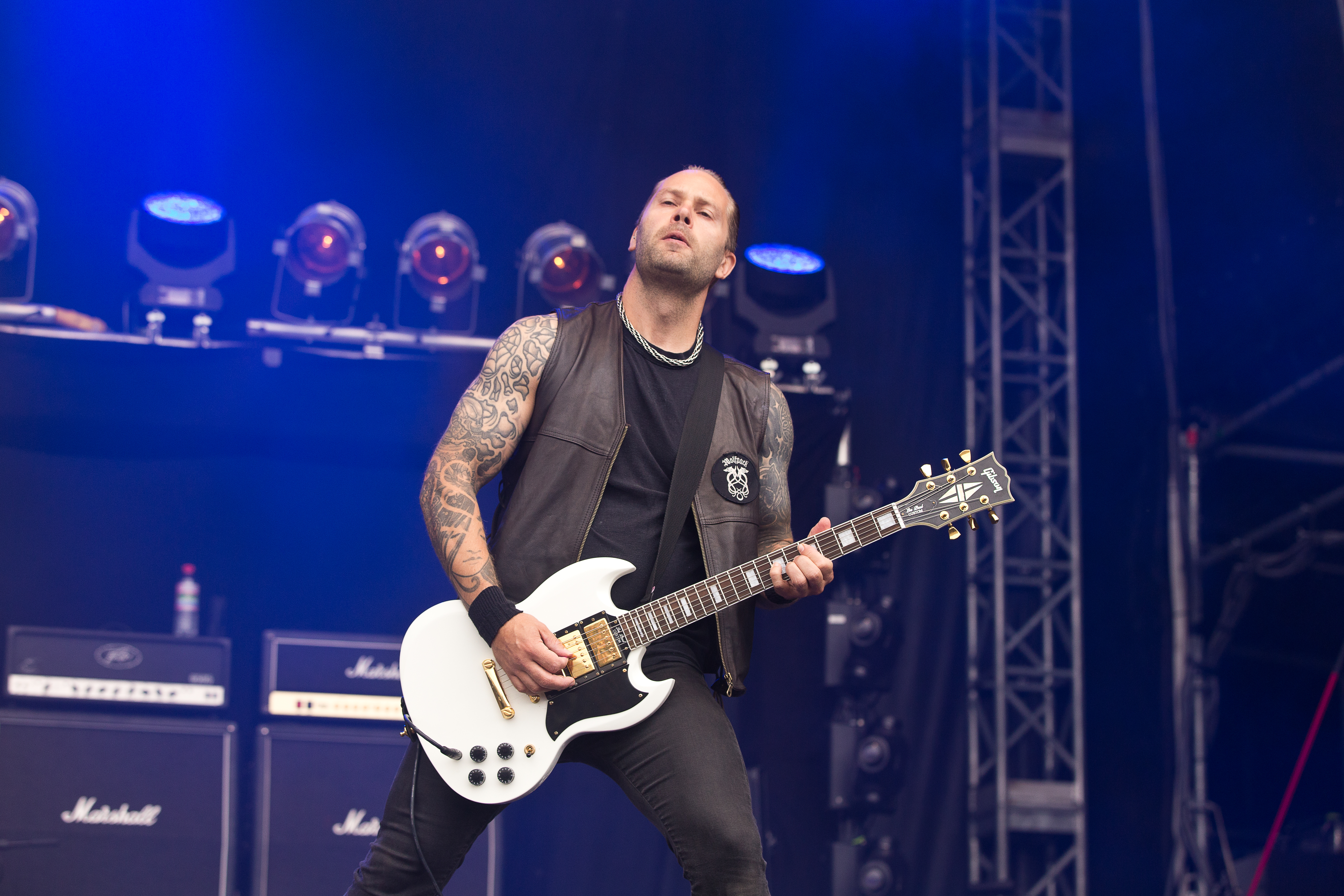
Erik Norberg

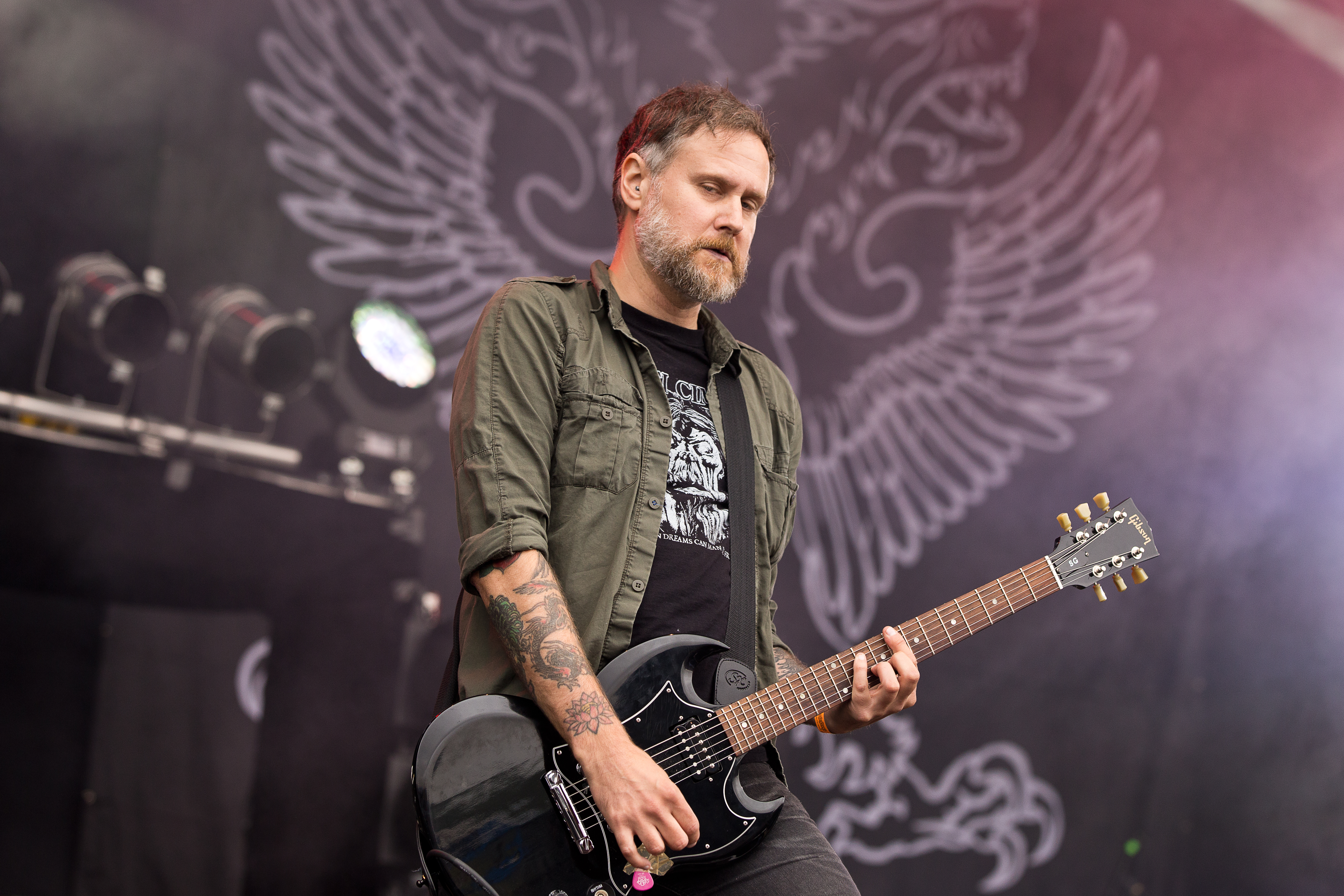
Jocke Rydbjer

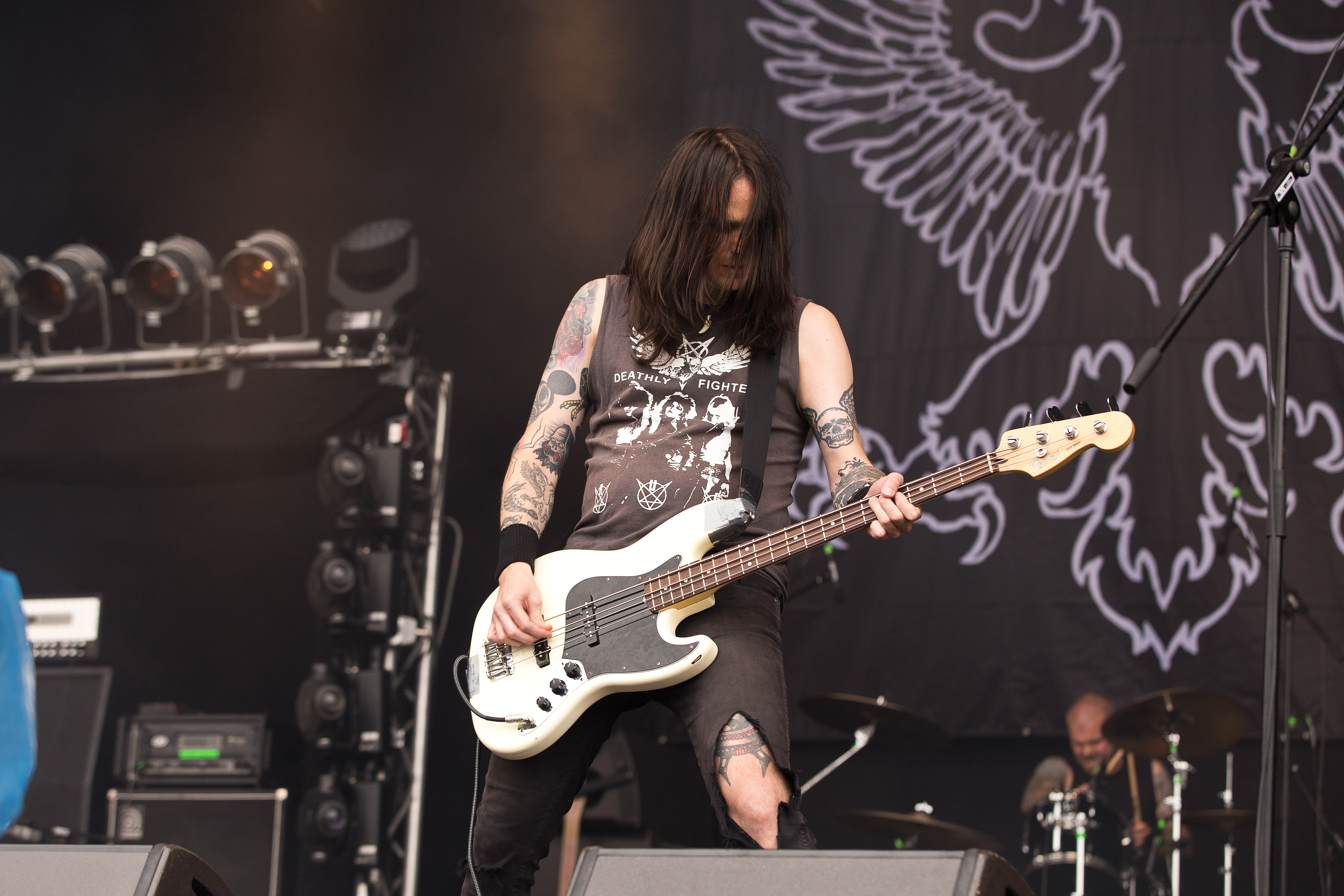
Johan Erkenvåg

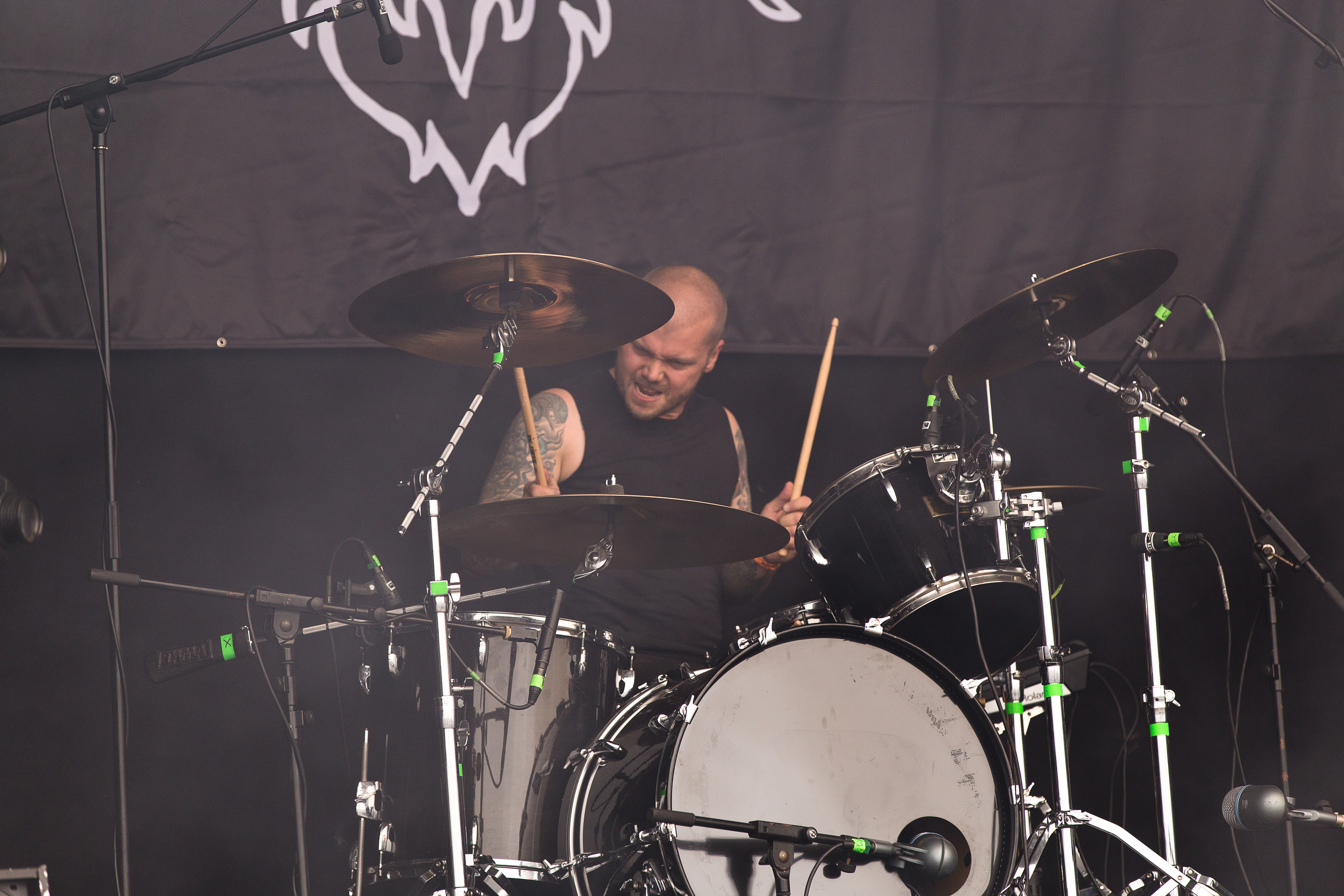
Tommy Storback

=== Former ===
- Tommy Storback – drums (2015-2024) (Nifters, The Clockwork Crew, ex- Booze and Glory
- Tomas Jonsson – vocals (1995-1998) (Anti Cimex, Moment Maniacs, Shitlickers)
- Frank Johansen – drums (1995-2002) (End of All, ex-Obscure Infinity)
- Marcus "M. Psykfall" Johansson – bass (1995-2004) (Harlequin)

== Discography ==
=== as Wolfpack ===
==== Albums ====
- A New Dawn Fades (1996)
- Lycanthro Punk (1997)
- Allday Hell (1999)

==== EPs and Splits ====
- Bloodstained Dreams (1995)
- Hellhound Warpig (1997)
- split with Skitsystem (1998)
- Hostile Wasteland (2025)

=== as Wolfbrigade ===
==== Albums ====
- Allday Hell (1999)
- Progression/Regression (2001)
- In Darkness You Feel No Regrets (2003)
- Prey to the World (2007)
- Comalive (2008)
- Damned (2012)
- Run with the Hunted (2017)
- The Enemy: Reality (2019)
- Life Knife Death (2024)
- Kill to Live(Live at Wolfden Studio) (2025)

==== EPs ====
- Split with Audio Kollaps (2001)
- A D-beat Odyssey (2004)
- Anti-Tank Dogs (2022)

==== Compilations ====
- The Wolfpack Years (2003)
