= Anticimex =

Pest control company

Anticimex Group
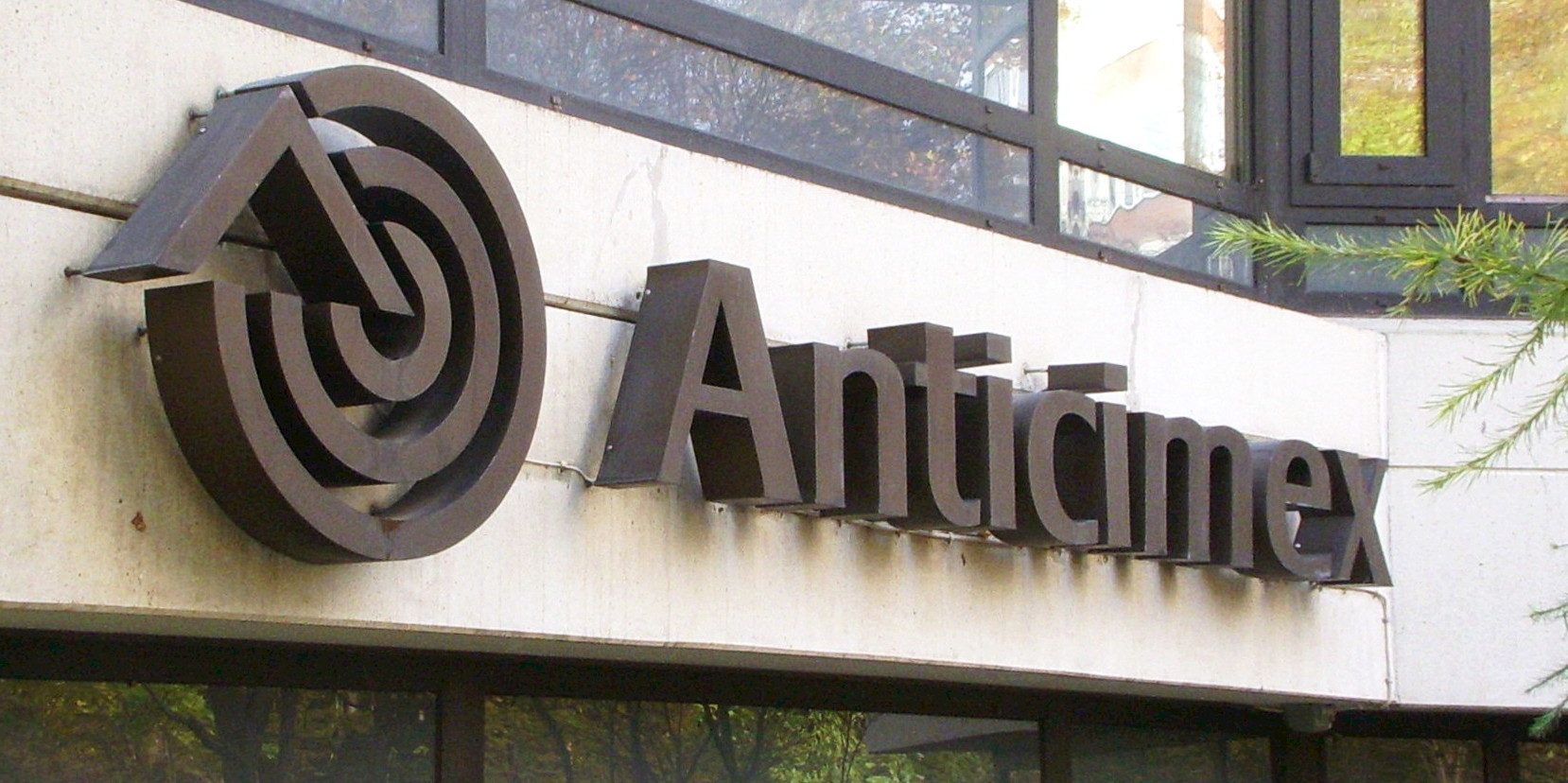
- Industry: pest control
- Founded: 1934
- Headquarters: Stockholm, Sweden
- Key people: Jarl Dahlfors (CEO); Gunnar Asp(Chairman)
- Services: Pest control
- Owner: EQT AB
- Number of employees: about 8,000

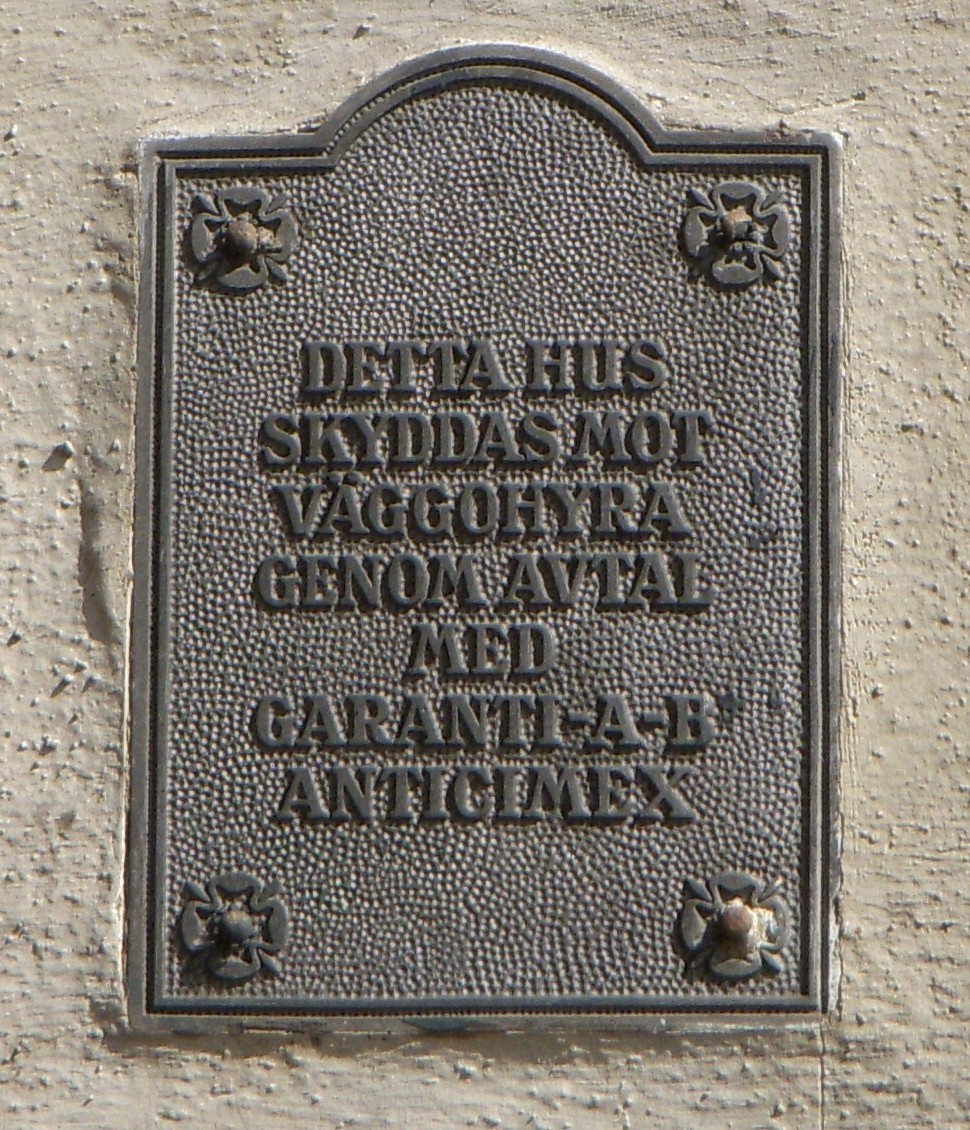
Former headquarters of Anticimex in Skeppsbron, Stockholm. The text translates to "This house is protected against wall pests through contract with Guarantee-A-B Anticimex".

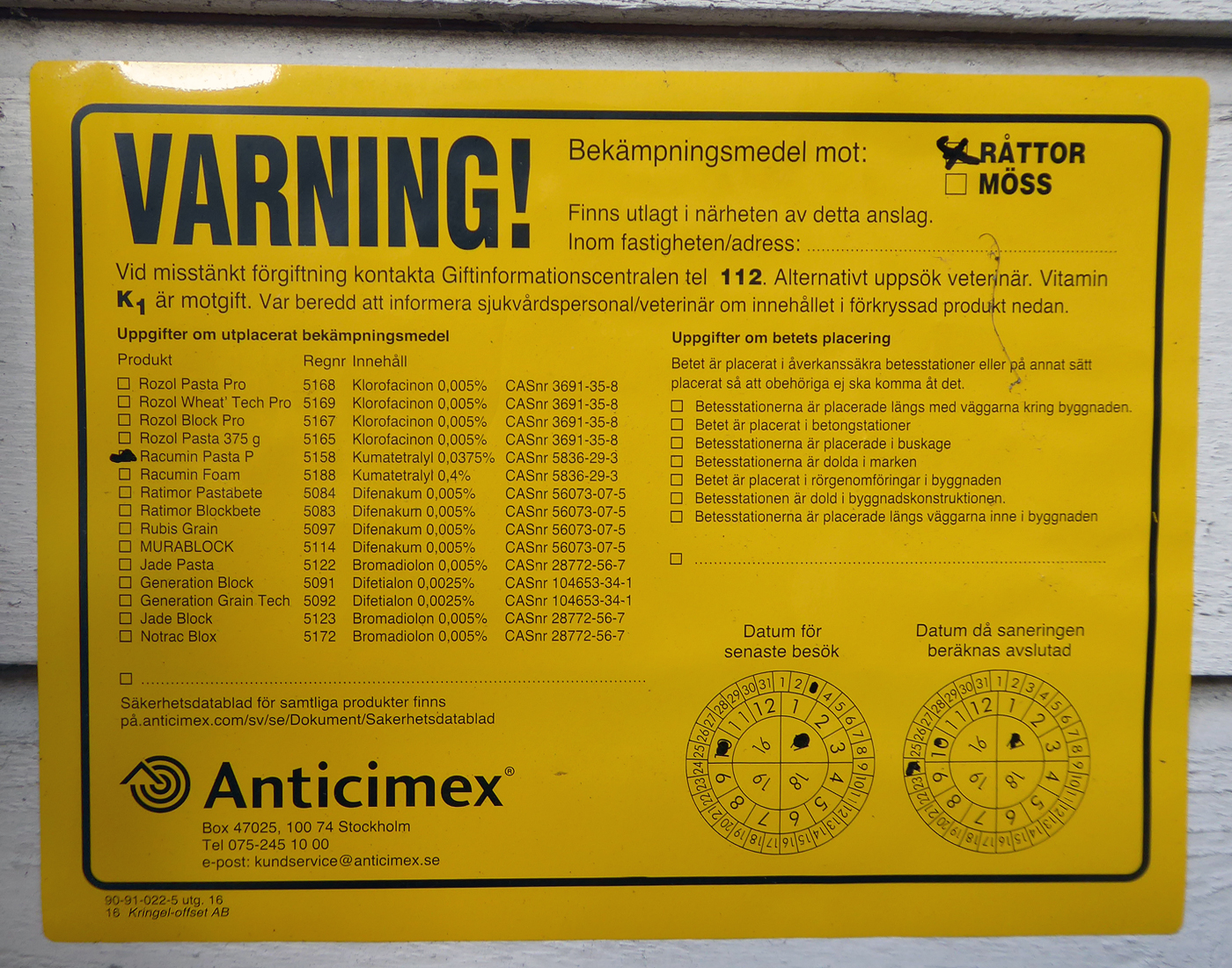
Swedish warning for Anticimex rat poison.

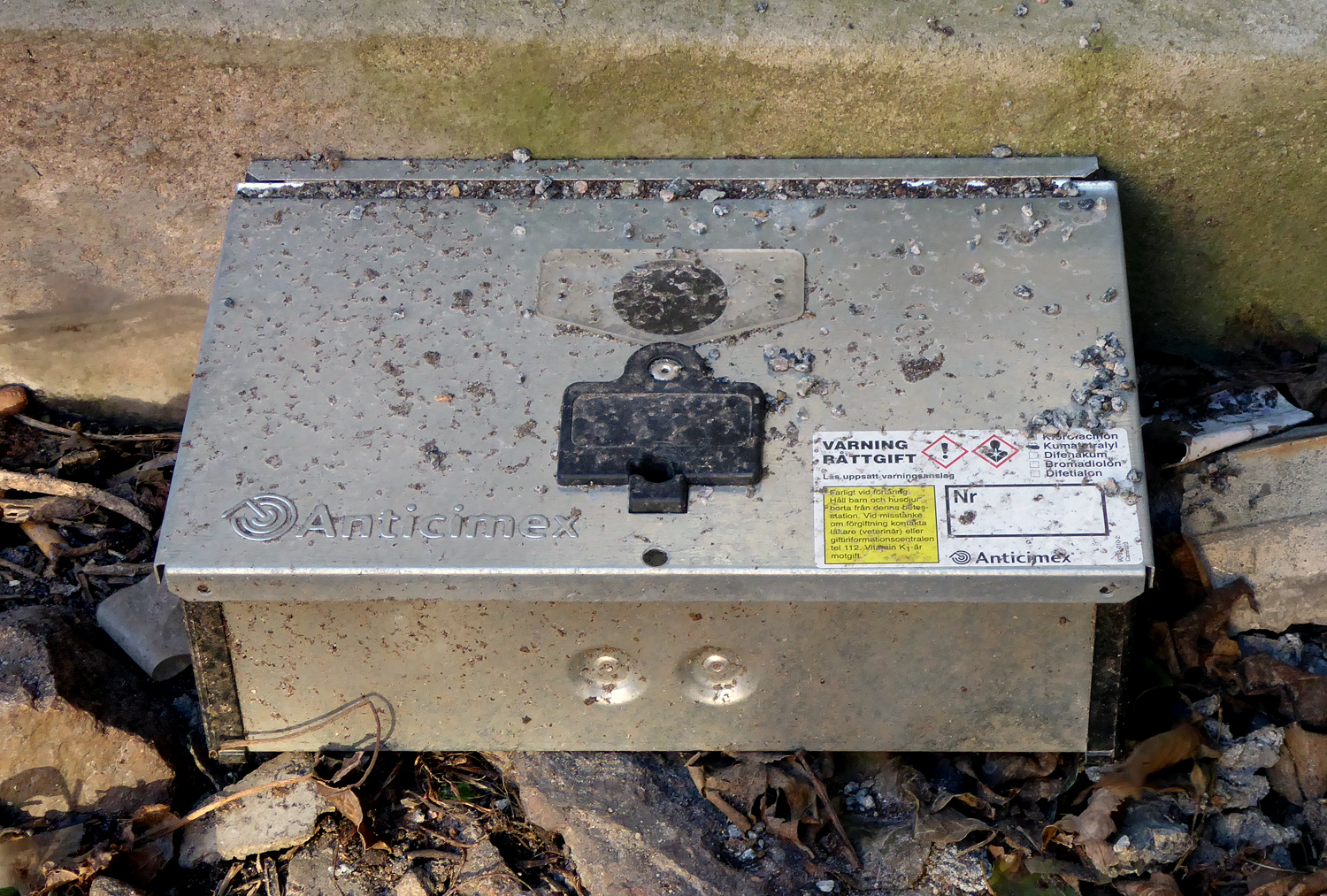
Trap containing Anticimex rat poison.

Anticimex is an international modern pest control company. Anticimex means "Against bed bugs". Anticimex is mainly owned by EQT AB and have subsidiaries in 21 countries.

Anticimex operates in the areas of pest control, building environments and hygiene. Anticimex employs around 11000 people, serving 3 million customers worldwide. In 2020, combined sales amounted to approximately 8,5 billion kronor.

In 1910, William Albert Flick, a dairy farmer, created a chemical compound that would control termites. His process and product were effective enough to found his own pest control business in 1918: called W.A. Flick & Co, later known as Flick Pest Control. Anticimex was then established in Sweden at 1934 during a time when approximately half of Swedish homes were infested with bed bugs.

The company has offices in Australia, Austria, Belgium, Cambodia, Colombia, Denmark, Finland, France, Germany, Italy, Netherlands, New Zealand, Norway, Portugal, Singapore, Spain, Sweden, Switzerland, UK and US. From 2006 to 2012, the firm was owned by Ratos and listed on the Stockholm Stock Exchange.

In most countries, the company is known from its original name "Anticimex"; in Australia and New Zealand it is known as "Flick".

In 2012, Anticimex was sold to investor-owned EQT AB. The parent company is Anticimex International AB and the head office is located in Stockholm, Sweden.

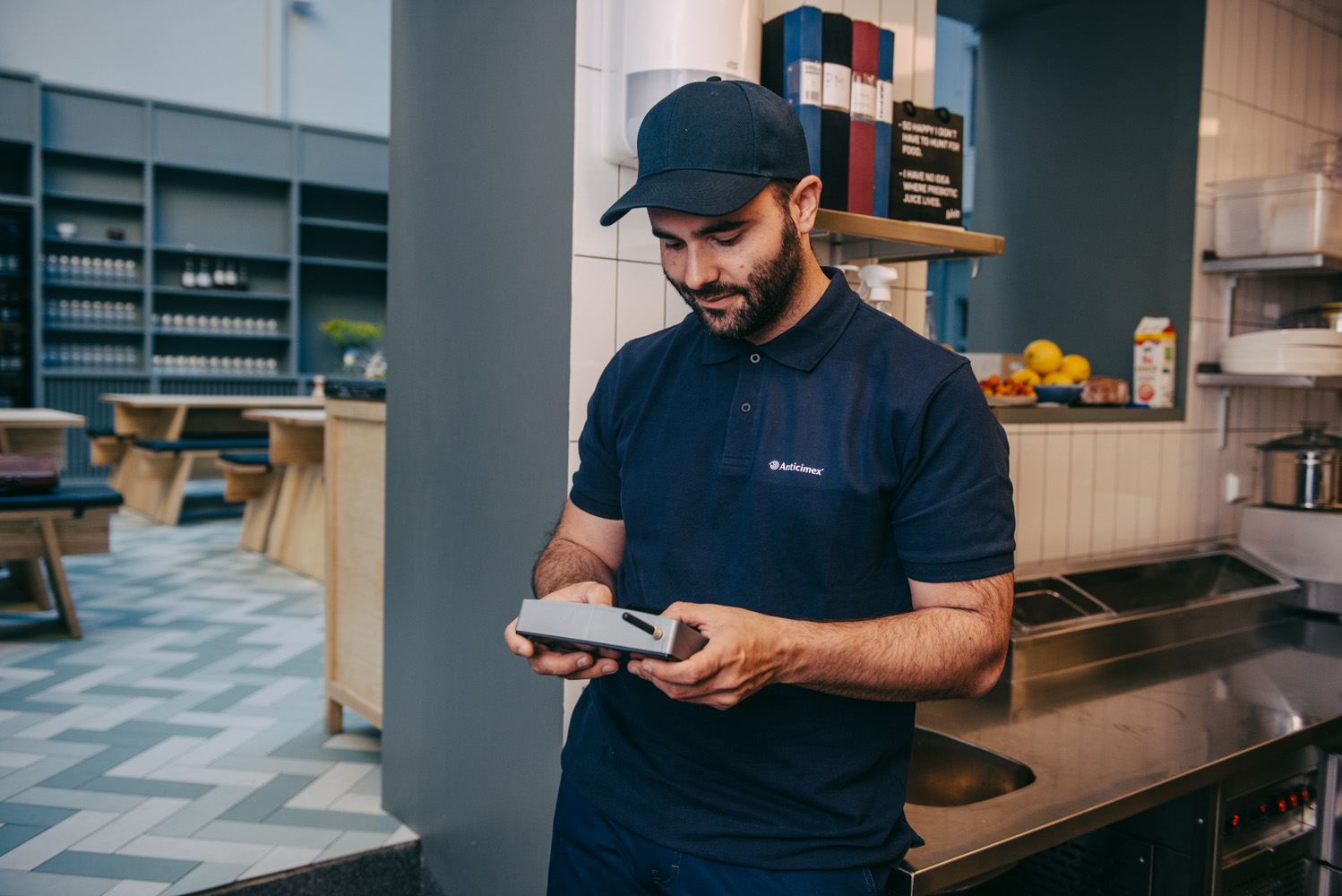
Ax SMART installation in kitchen

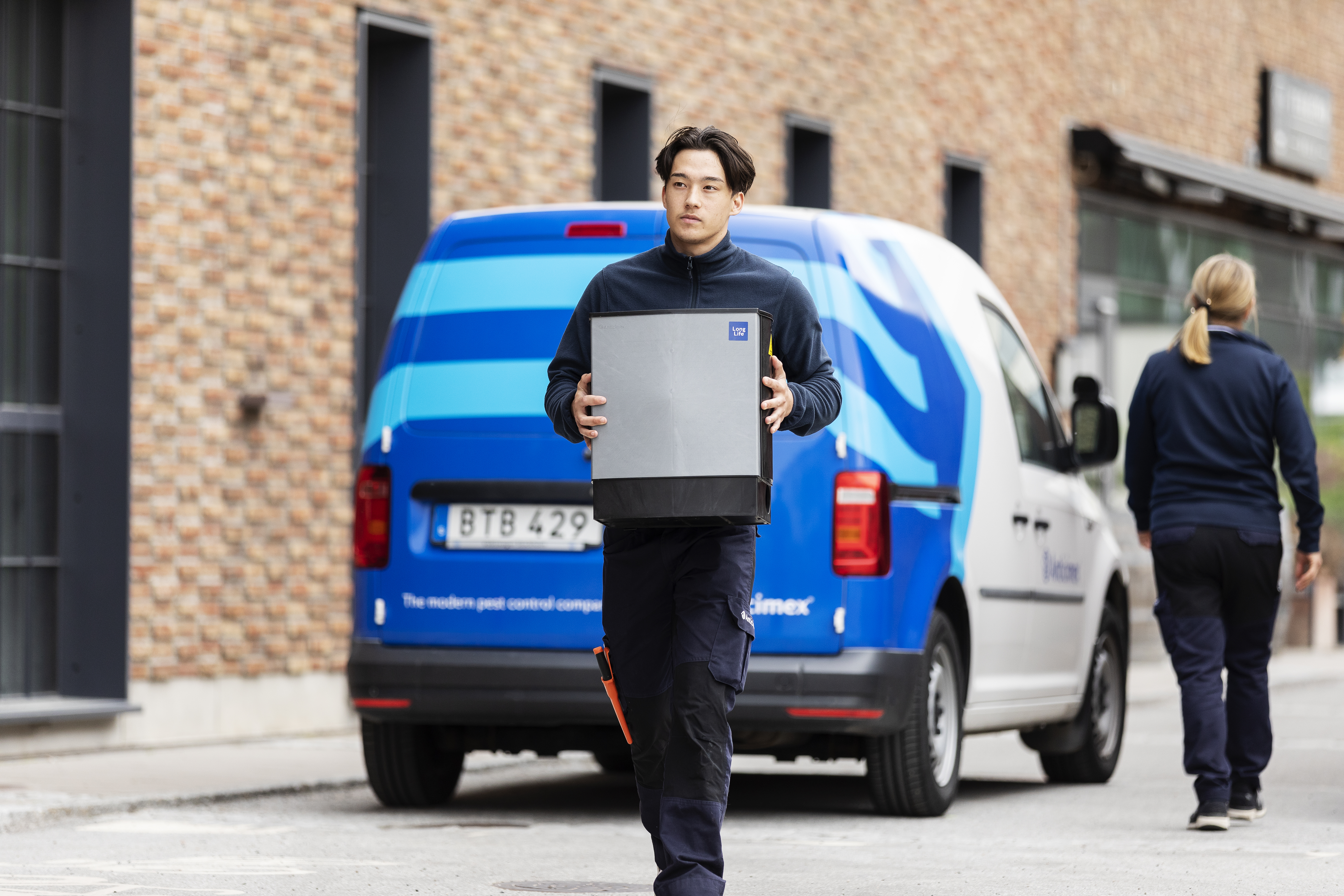
Anticimex technicians installing SMART traps.
