= D-beat =

Genre of hardcore punk

- Other names: Discore; kängpunk; Discrust
- Stylistic origins: Hardcore punk; street punk; anarcho-punk; heavy metal
- Cultural origins: Early 1980s, England and Sweden
- Derivative forms: Crust punk; thrash metal

Other topics
- Speed metal; thrashcore

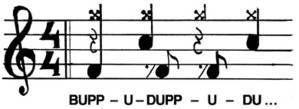
the 'D-Beat' in musical notation

D-beat (also known as Discore, kängpunk, Discrust, and crust-beat) is a style of hardcore punk, developed in the early 1980s by Discharge, after whom the genre is named, as well as a drum beat characteristic of this subgenre. D-beat is known for its "grinding, distorted and brutally political" sound. Discharge may have themselves inherited the beat from Motörhead and the Buzzcocks. D-beat is closely associated with crust punk, which is a heavier, more complex variation. The style was particularly popular in Sweden, and developed there by groups such as Crude SS, Anti Cimex, Mob 47, and Driller Killer. Other D-beat groups include Doom and the Varukers from the UK; Disclose from Japan; Crucifix and Final Conflict from the U.S.; Ratos de Porão from Brazil; and MG15 from Spain. While the style initially developed in the early 1980s, a number of new groups working within the subgenre emerged in the mid-1990s. These include the Swedish groups Wolfbrigade, Skitsystem, and Disfear.

== History ==
=== Origins ===
One of the earliest examples of D-beat can be found in the Buzzcocks' song "You Tear Me Up," on their debut LP, Another Music In A Different Kitchen. It featured a fast, intense drumbeat which Discharge would later emulate in the distinctive drumbeat of D-beat. Discharge formed in 1977 in Stoke-on-Trent, England, initially playing a basic variety of street punk inspired by the Sex Pistols and The Clash. In 1979, the group changed its line-up and began to develop a new, more aggressive style. At this time Terry "Tezz" Roberts of Discharge developed their characteristic drum beat, for which the D-beat subgenre is named. Roberts commented in 2004 that "I just wanna be remembered for coming up with that fuckin' D-beat in the first place! And inspiring all those f-ckin' great Discore bands around the world!" Discharge's inspiration for the style has led it to be referred to as "Discore". Roberts' beat is similar to the basic percussive backbone of songs by Motörhead, and many subsequent groups borrow from this group a great deal as well as Discharge. After 1982, the group changed its style to a more conventional form of heavy metal. However, their classic sound inspired other groups to emulate them; The Varukers, also from England, were the first of these. As punk historian Ian Glasper put it, "The Varukers were the original Discore band, the first and best of the hardcore punk acts to take the simple, yet devastatingly effective formula laid down by Discharge and play it as fast, hard, heavy as they could." and that "In the turbulent wake of Discharge, a hundred Discore – or D-beat – punk bands sprang up around the world." While the style was first practiced in England, it became especially inspirational to a number of groups in Sweden.

D-beat was initially known as "kängpunk" ("boot punk") in Sweden. The first Swedish D-beat song is "Marquee," by Rude Kids, from Stockholm, recorded in 1979. They were followed by KSMB (En Slemmig Torsk), Missbrukarna, and more famously, Anti Cimex. Anti Cimex's second 7-inch EP, Raped Ass, has been described as "one of the rawest and most violent hardcore releases ever." Other such groups included Moderat Likvidation, Asocial, and most prominently Mob 47. Mob 47, also from Stockholm, was known as the fastest of the kängpunk groups. The group also blended Discharge's style with American hardcore punk, diversifying the style. The heaviest of Swedish crust bands was Crude SS

=== 1980s ===
In England, a second style of anarcho-punk similar to D-beat developed in the mid-1980s. This style borrowed from the Swedish kängpunk groups as well as British anarcho-punk, heavy metal, and post-punk. The term "crust" was coined by Hellbastard on their 1986 Ripper Crust demo. As punk historian Ian Glasper puts it: "Rippercrust is widely regarded as the first time the word 'crust' was used in the punk context, and hence the specific starting point of the whole crustcore genre, although some would attribute that accolade to the likes of Disorder, Chaos UK, and Amebix several years earlier." Malcolm "Scruff" Lewty, vocalist and guitarist of Hellbastard, commented, "A lot of people say we started the crust-punk genre, but whatever. If they wanna say that, I don't mind, but I'm certainly no Malcolm McLaren, saying I invented something I didn't." Amebix and Antisect are often located as the originators of crust punk.

Amebix's Arise LP and Antisect's Out from the Void single, both released in 1985, offer a template for the subgenre. In the late 1980s, Doom, from Birmingham, practiced D-beat indebted to Discharge as well as to crust punk. Punk journalist Felix von Havoc contends that Doom, Excrement of War, Electro Hippies and Extreme Noise Terror were among the first bands to have the traditional UK "crust" sound. Additional subgenres of this style began to develop. Deviated Instinct, from Norwich, created "stenchcore", bringing "both the look and sound – dirty and metallic, respectively – to their natural conclusion". Initially an anarcho-punk group, they began to take increasing influence from metal. As vocalist Julian "Leggo" Kilsby comments: "We were very much a part of the anarcho scene, to start with, very politically motivated... all the way through the band's existence, really, although it got less obvious as time went by. But I never really liked the straightforward 'War is bad...' lyrics that were so prevalent at the time, so as my writing skills improved I wanted to add more depth to our lyrics and make them more metaphorical; I'd always been into horror films, so that started to manifest itself in the imagery I was using..."

Crust punk groups took some influence from the early black metal of Venom and Celtic Frost. Similarly, Bathory was initially inspired by crust punk as well as metal. Crust was affected by a second wave of influence in the 1990s, with some bands emphasizing these black metal elements. Iskra are probably the most obvious example of second wave black metal-influenced crust punk; Iskra coined their own phrase "blackened crust" to describe this new style. The Japanese group Gallhammer also blend crust with black metal. In addition, Norwegian band Darkthrone have incorporated crust punk traits in their more recent material. As Daniel Ekeroth wrote in 2008 :"In a very ironic paradox, black metal and crust punk have recently started to embrace one another. Members of Darkthrone and Satyricon have lately claimed that they love punk, while among crusties, black metal is the latest fashion. In fact, the latest album by crust punk band Skitsystem sounds very black metal—while the latest black metal opus by Darkthrone sounds very punk! This would have been unimaginable in the early 90s."

American crust punk began in New York City, also in the mid-'80s, with the work of Nausea. The group emerged from the Lower East Side squat scene and New York hardcore, living with Roger Miret of Agnostic Front. The early work of Neurosis, from Oakland, CA, also borrowed from Amebix, and inaugurated crust punk on the West Coast. Disrupt (Boston), Antischism (South Carolina), and Destroy! (Minneapolis) were also significant U.S. crust groups.

Extreme Noise Terror is credited with developing this style into grindcore. However, Pete Hurley, the guitarist for the group, declared that he had no interest in being remembered as a pioneer of this style: "'grindcore' was a legendarily stupid term coined by a hyperactive kid from the West Midlands, and it had nothing to do with us whatsoever. ENT were, are, and – I suspect – always will be a hardcore punk band... not a grindcore band, a stenchcore band, a trampcore band, or any other sub-sub-sub-core genre-defining term you can come up with."

=== 1990s ===
An important American crust punk band was Aus-Rotten from Pittsburgh, Pennsylvania. Crust punk also flourished in Minneapolis, shepherded by the Profane Existence label. In this period, the ethos of crust punk became particularly codified, with vegetarianism, feminism, and sometimes straight edge being prescribed by many of the figures in the scene. The powerviolence scene associated with Slap-a-Ham Records was in close proximity to crust punk, particularly in the case of Man Is the Bastard and Dropdead. Crust was also prominent in the American South, where Prank Records and CrimethInc. acted as focal points of the scene. The most well-known representative of Southern crust was His Hero Is Gone. Many Swedish groups of the 1990s began to play a combination of D-beat with crust punk. These bands, including Driller Killer, Totalitär, Skitsystem, Wolfbrigade, and Disfear, remain some of the most well-known D-beat bands, although their sound has cleaved closely to developments in death metal.

== Characteristics ==
=== Vocals and lyrics ===
The vocal content of D-beat tends towards shouted slogans. The style is distinguished from its predecessors by its minimal lyrical content and greater proximity to heavy metal. D-beat bands typically have anti-war, anarchist messages and closely follow the bleak nuclear war imagery of 1980s anarcho-punk bands. Rock journalist Robbie Mackey described D-beat as characterized by "hardcore drumming set against breakneck riffage and unintelligible howls about anarchy, working-stiffs-as-rats, and banding together to, you know, fight."

Vocals in crust punk are often shrieked or shouted, and may be shared between two or more vocalists. The lyrical content of crust punk tends to be bleak and nihilistic, yet politically engaged. Crust punk songs are often about nuclear war, militarism, animal rights, police, personal grievances, oppressive states and fascism. Amebix were also interested in various forms of mysticism and Gnosticism. Malcolm "Scruff" Lewty, guitarist and vocalist of Hellbastard, describes the distinction between metal and crust punk lyrics:

Metal lyrics were so dumb, so far removed from daily life. Venom were going on about Satan... and bikes... and Satan... and women... and Satan! You know what? I never got up in the morning and said, 'Fuck yeah! Satan! Let's go and meet my disciples from Hell!' I'd switch on the TV and know I was going to see hundreds of people dying because there'd been an earthquake in the third world... and all these people starving to death while military expenditure still increased... That was – and still is – the reality of it. The whole heavy metal thing is just an escape from reality, into this other world of... well, bullshit basically.

—

=== Drum beat ===
The name "D-beat" refers to a specific drumbeat, associated with The Varukers, Brian Roe (Brains), Discharge, Garry Malloney & Tez Roberts, Discharge's first drummer, though rock musicians such as Buzzcocks and Diamond Head had used the beat previously. The term was coined by Rich Militia, the singer of Sore Throat, in 1988, to describe the drum pattern played by Dave "Bambi" Ellesmere, Roberts's replacement, on Discharge's EP Why.

Three versions of D-beat drum tabs:

First (like early Anti Cimex and Discharge):

C:|x--x-x--x--x-x--:||
S:|--o---o---o---o-:||
K:|o--o-o--o--o-o--:||
   1 + 2 + 3 + 4 +            S=snare K=kick  C=crash

Second — Verse and chorus (like Avskum):

H:|x-x-x-x-x-x-x-x-:||           C:|x-x-x-x-x-x-x-x-:||
S:|--o---o---o---o-:||           S:|--o---o---o---o-:||
K:|o--o-o--o--o-o--:||           K:|o--o-o--o--o-o--:||
   1 + 2 + 3 + 4 +                  1 + 2 + 3 + 4 +     S=snare K=kick  H=hihat  C=crash

Third (Thrash/speed metal beat) ( or):

H:|x-x-x-x-x-x-x-x-:||
S:|--o---o---o---o-:||
K:|o----o--o--o-o--:||
   1 + 2 + 3 + 4 +          S=snare K=kick  H=hihat

== See also ==
- Anarcho-punk
- Crust punk

== Sources ==
- Ekeroth, Daniel (2008). Swedish Death Metal. Bazillion Points Books. ISBN 978-0-9796163-1-0
- Glasper, Ian (2009). Trapped in a Scene: UK Hardcore 1985–1989. Cherry Red Books. ISBN 978-1-901447-61-3
- Glasper, Ian (2006). The Day the Country Died: A History of Anarcho Punk 1980 to 1984. Cherry Red Books. ISBN 1-901447-70-7
- Grindcore Special (2009), "In Grind We Crust," 181, 41–56.
- Glasper, Ian (2004). Burning Britain: The History of UK Punk, 1980–1984. Cherry Red. ISBN 9781901447248.
