= Disclose =

Japanese crust punk band

- Origin: Kōchi City, Japan
- Genres: D-beat, hardcore punk
- Years active: 1990–2007
- Past members: Tsukasa; Kawakami; Fukugawa; Yasuoka; Will; Yuusei; Gori; Abe; Masa; Hiro the Aggression; Fujiwara; Uo-Katsu; Doi; Aki; Naoto; Joe

Disclose were a Japanese D-beat band from Kōchi City, heavily influenced by Discharge. Their sound heavily replicates Discharge's style, with an increased use of fuzz and distortion guitar effects. The subject matter is also similar to Discharge, in that the songs' themes are primarily about nuclear war, and its horrific consequences. On 5 June 2007, Disclose frontman Hideki Kawakami died from acute alcohol poisoning .

== Former members ==
- Tsukasa (vocals)
- Kawakami (vocals, lead guitar)
- Fukugawa (bass guitar)
- Yasuoka (bass guitar)
- Ben (bass guitar)
- Herb (guitar)
- Jung (bass guitar)
- Will (bass guitar)
- Yuusei (bass guitar)
- Gori (bass guitar)
- Abe (bass guitar, US tour)
- Masa (bass guitar)
- Hiro the Aggression (drums and bass sometimes)
- Fujiwara (drums)
- Daniel (guitar)
- Uo-Katsu (drums)
- Doi (drums)
- Aki (drums)
- Naoto (?)
- Joe (?)

== Discography ==
=== LPs ===
- Tragedy (1994)
- Yesterday’s Fairytale, Tomorrow’s Nightmare (1/6/2003)
- The Demos Album (1995)
- No More Pain

=== 12" ===
- Nightmare or Reality (May/June 1999)

=== Split 12" ===
- Split 12" with Totalitär (2000)

=== 10"es ===
- Great Swedish Feast (1995)
- The Aspects of War (1997)
- Nuclear Hell (with G.A.T.E.S., 2005)

=== 7"es ===
- Once the War Started (1993)
- Visions of War (1996)
- 4 track EP (1997)
- The Nuclear Victims (1998)
- A Mass of Raw Sound Assault (2001)
- Apocalypse of Death (March 2002)
- Neverending War (2003)
- The Sound of Disaster (2003)
- Apocalypse Continues (2004) Overthrow Records

=== Split 7"es ===
- Kochi-City Hardcore (with Insane Youth, 1993)
- Why Must We Die? (with Hellkrusher. 1994)
- No More Pain! (with Selfish, 1994)
- (unknown) (with Warcollapse, 1995)
- War of aggression (with Cluster Bomb Unit, 1995)
- Attack The Enemy (with Homomillita, 1995)
- Endless War (with Squandered, 1998)
- Chainsaw Tour '04 (with Framtid, 2004)
- Noise Not Music (with No Fucker, 2004)
- Split 7" with Hakuchi (2004)
- Dis-Nightmare still continues (with World Burns to Death, 2004)
- Split 7" with Besthöven (2005)
- In Chaos We Trust (with FlyBlown, 2005)
- Controlled By Fear (with Cruelty, 2005)
- Split 7" with Scarred For Life, (2007)

=== Demos ===
- Crime (1992)
- Conquest (1993)
- Fear of the War (1993)
- Total Dis-Lickers (1998)

=== Tapes ===
- The Aspect of War (1997)
- Sound of Disaster (2003)
- The Best of Disclose 1993-2001 (2006)

=== Compilations ===
- Demo & Live 92 (1992, Combines Crime and Conquest demos, plus a live show from December 1992)
- Raw Brutal Assault Vol. 1 (2003, has tracks from 1992–1994)
- Raw Brutal Assault Vol. 2 (2003, has tracks from 1994–1998)
