= Monuments to Thieves =

Studio album by His Hero Is Gone
- Released: November 18, 1997
- Studio: Polymorph (Oakland, California)
- Genre: Crust punk
- Length: 25:15
- Label: Prank
- Producer: Dan Rathbun

His Hero Is Gone chronology
| Fifteen Counts of Arson (1997) | Monuments to Thieves (1997) | Fool's Gold EP (1998) |

Monuments to Thieves is the second studio album by American crust punk band His Hero Is Gone. It was released on November 18, 1997 through Prank Records. It was recorded by Dan Rathburn at Polymorph in Oakland, California. Featuring the band's typical crust punk sound, the album deals with topics such as institutional racism and oppression.

== Critical reception ==
Professional ratings
Review scores
| Source | Rating |
|---|---|
| AllMusic | 4/5 stars |

AllMusic critic Paul Kott described Monuments to Thieves as "a masterpiece: a tight, cohesive, thought provoking call for change from street level" and stated that "the songwriting and confidence displayed on this recording are completely irrefutable." Kott also further wrote that the album "may be more of the same from this amazing band, but it's so much more."

== Track listing ==
1. "Like Weeds" — 2:20
2. "Monuments to Thieves" — 1:53
3. "Paranoia Secured" — 0:20
4. "Carry On" — 1:42
5. "Automation" — 0:51
6. "Cavities" — 1:32
7. "Chain of Command" — 3:33
8. "Headless/Heartless" — 2:06
9. "Hinges" — 1:01
10. "Sin & Vice" — 1:31
11. "The Mess" — 1:09
12. "Disease of Ease" — 1:36
13. "Under Watchful Eyes" — 1:27
14. "Stacks" — 1:32
15. "The Unwanted Child" — 2:42

== Personnel ==
Album personnel as adapted from album liner notes.

His Hero Is Gone

- Todd Burdette — guitar, vocals
- Yannick Lorraine — guitar
- Carl Auge — bass, vocals
- Paul Burdette — drums

Other personnel

- Dan Rathbun — recording engineer, producer
- George Horn — mastering
