= Škoda Fabia =

Czech supermini car

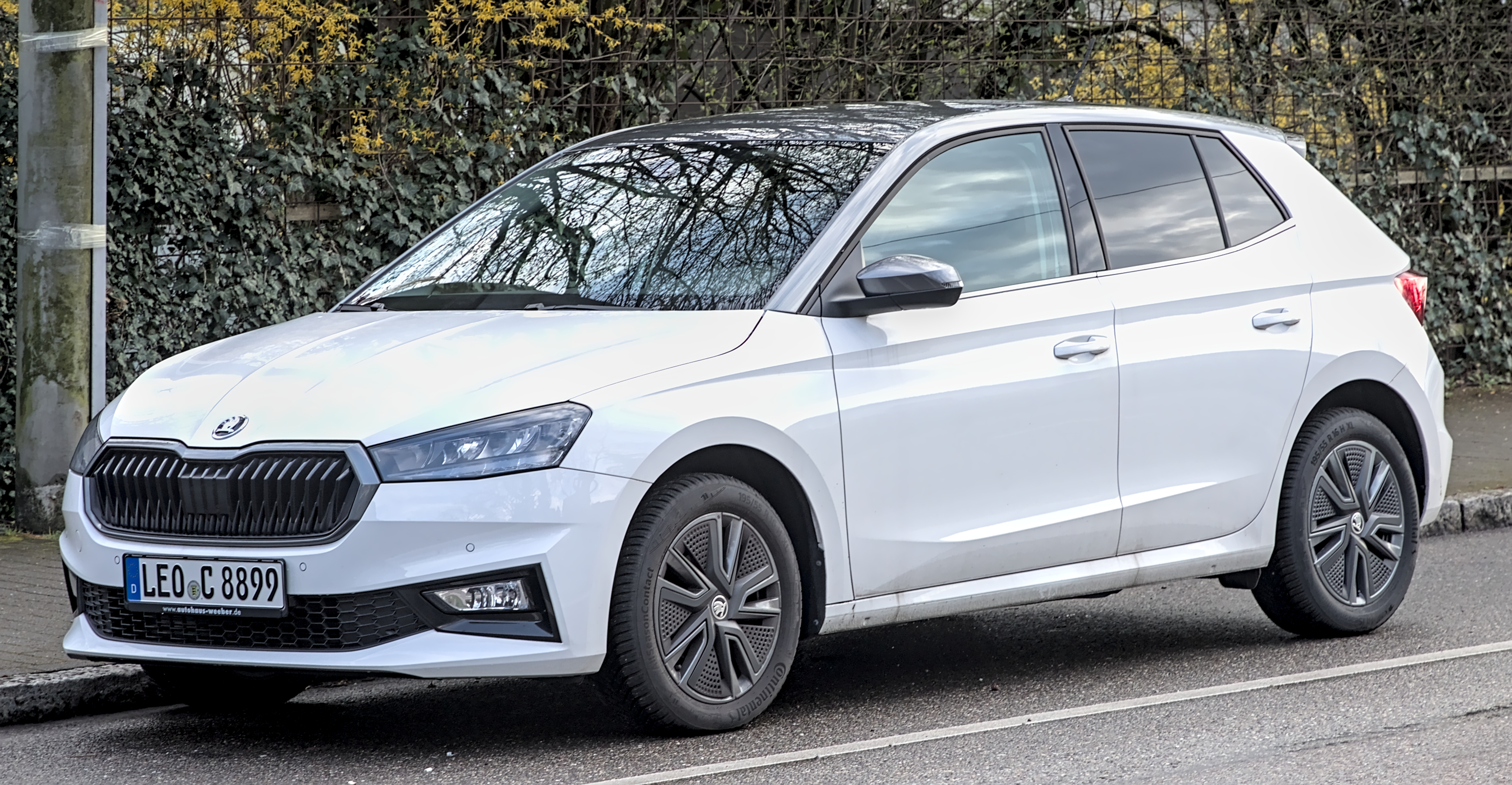

Overview
- Manufacturer: Škoda Auto
- Production: 1999–present

Body and chassis
- Class: Supermini (B)

Chronology
- Predecessor: Škoda Felicia

The Škoda Fabia is a series of passenger cars produced by Czech manufacturer Škoda Auto since 1999. It is the successor of the Škoda Felicia, which was discontinued in 2001. The Fabia was available in hatchback, estate (named Fabia Combi) and saloon (named Fabia Sedan) body styles at launch, and from 2007, the second generation was offered in hatchback and estate versions. The third generation Fabia was launched in 2015, and the fourth in 2021.

== First generation (Type 6Y; 1999) ==
Škoda Fabia Mk1
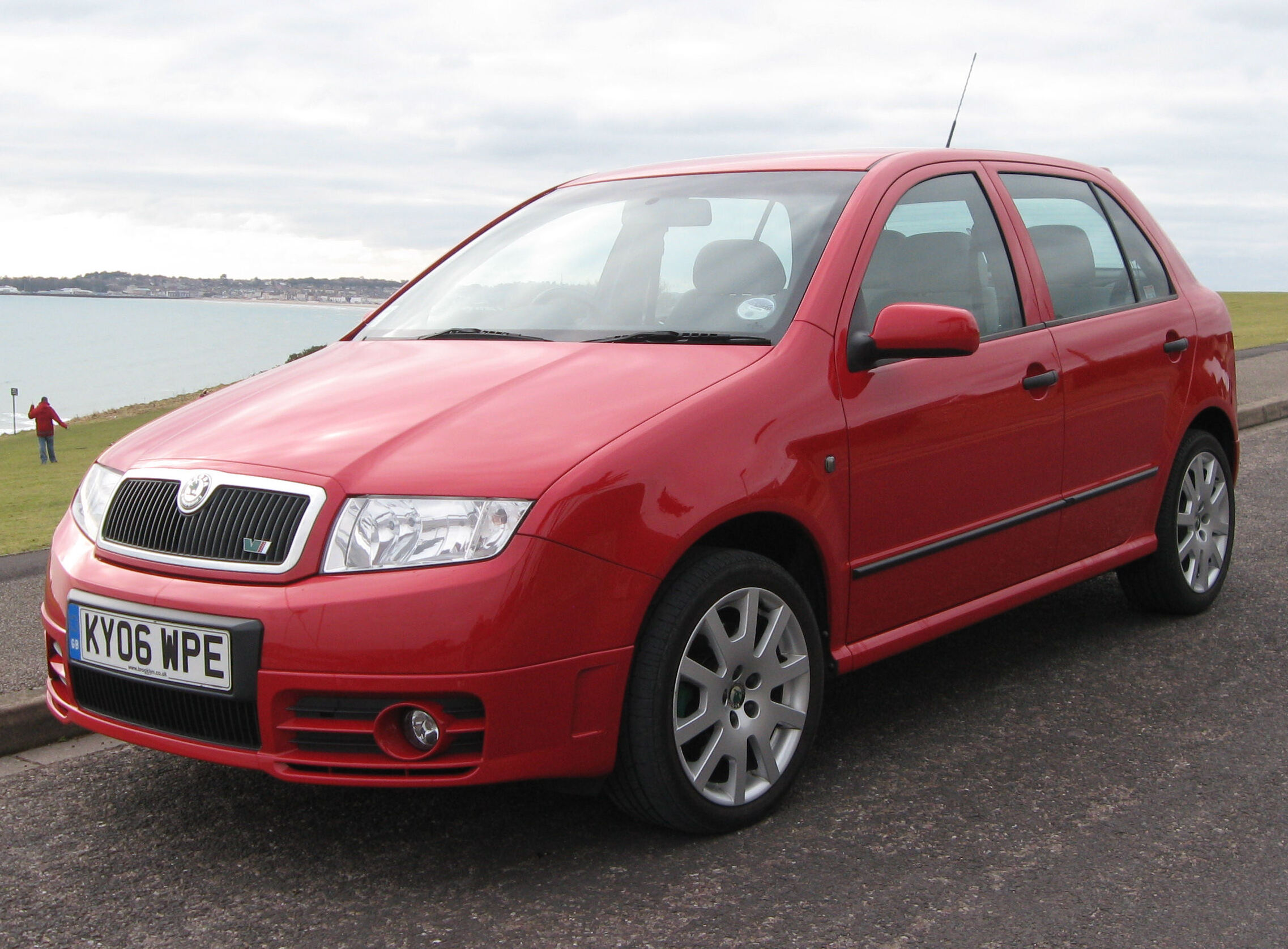
- Škoda Fabia vRS hatchback (facelift)

Overview
- Model code: Typ 6Y
- Production: July 1999 – May 2009 (Czech Republic); October 1999 – March 2007 (Poland); November 1999 - March 2008 (Germany); December 1999 - May 2007 (Russia)
- Assembly: Mladá Boleslav, Czech Republic; Poznań, Poland; Sarajevo, Bosnia and Herzegovina; Nairobi, Kenya (CMC); Solomonovo, Ukraine (Eurocar); Kaluga, Russia

Body and chassis
- Body style: 4-door saloon 5-door hatchback 5-door estate
- Platform: Volkswagen Group A04 (PQ24)
- Related: SEAT Ibiza Mk3; SEAT Córdoba Mk2; Volkswagen Polo Mk4

Powertrain
- Engine: Petrol: 1.0 L OHV I4; 1.2 L I3; 1.2 L DOHC 12V I3; 1.4 L OHV I4; 1.4 L DOHC 16V I4; 2.0 L I4; Diesel: 1.4 L TDI I3; 1.9 L SDI I4; 1.9 L TDI I4
- Transmission: 5-speed manual 6-speed manual (RS only); 4-speed automatic

Dimensions
- Wheelbase: 2,462 mm (96.9 in)
- Length: 3,960 mm (155.9 in) (hatchback); 4,220 mm (166.1 in) (saloon/estate)
- Width: 1,650 mm (65.0 in)
- Height: 1,450 mm (57.1 in)

The first generation Fabia (given the internal type code 6Y) was officially presented at the Frankfurt Motor Show in September 1999 and production of this model started in July the same year. The estate version Fabia Combi was introduced in September 2000 at the Paris Motor Show. It was the first model to use the Volkswagen Group's A04 platform, which it shared with the Volkswagen Polo Mk4 and SEAT Ibiza. In the United Kingdom, for 2000, this car won What Car?'s "Car of the Year". The range started with the 1.0 8v Classic (which was cheaper than Volkswagen's smaller 3-door 1.0 Lupo when it went on sale) to the 2.0 Elegance; eventually the 1.9 PD TDi RS was added at the top of the line.

Part of the Fabia's success was the fact that all of its mechanical parts were developed by or in conjunction with Volkswagen, but were offered in a package that is priced to undercut other models in the Volkswagen Group. The only traces of non-VW Škoda left in the Fabia are the 1.0 and 1.4 "MPI" engines, pushrod designs with three-bearing crankshafts. These were modifications of Škoda's own 1.3 engine, and were used in pre-Volkswagen Škodas such as the 130 and Favorit. The low cost 1.0 was introduced in April 2000. The pushrod 1.0 and 1.4 ended production in April 2003, not long after the introduction of the Czech-made, three-cylinder 1.2 MPI engine. This model was a locally developed three-cylinder derivative of Volkswagen's 1.6-litre four and was built in Mladá Boleslav. In 2003, the name of the three-cylinder engine was changed to HTP, for "High Torque Power", indicating the engine's ample torque, low peak power notwithstanding.

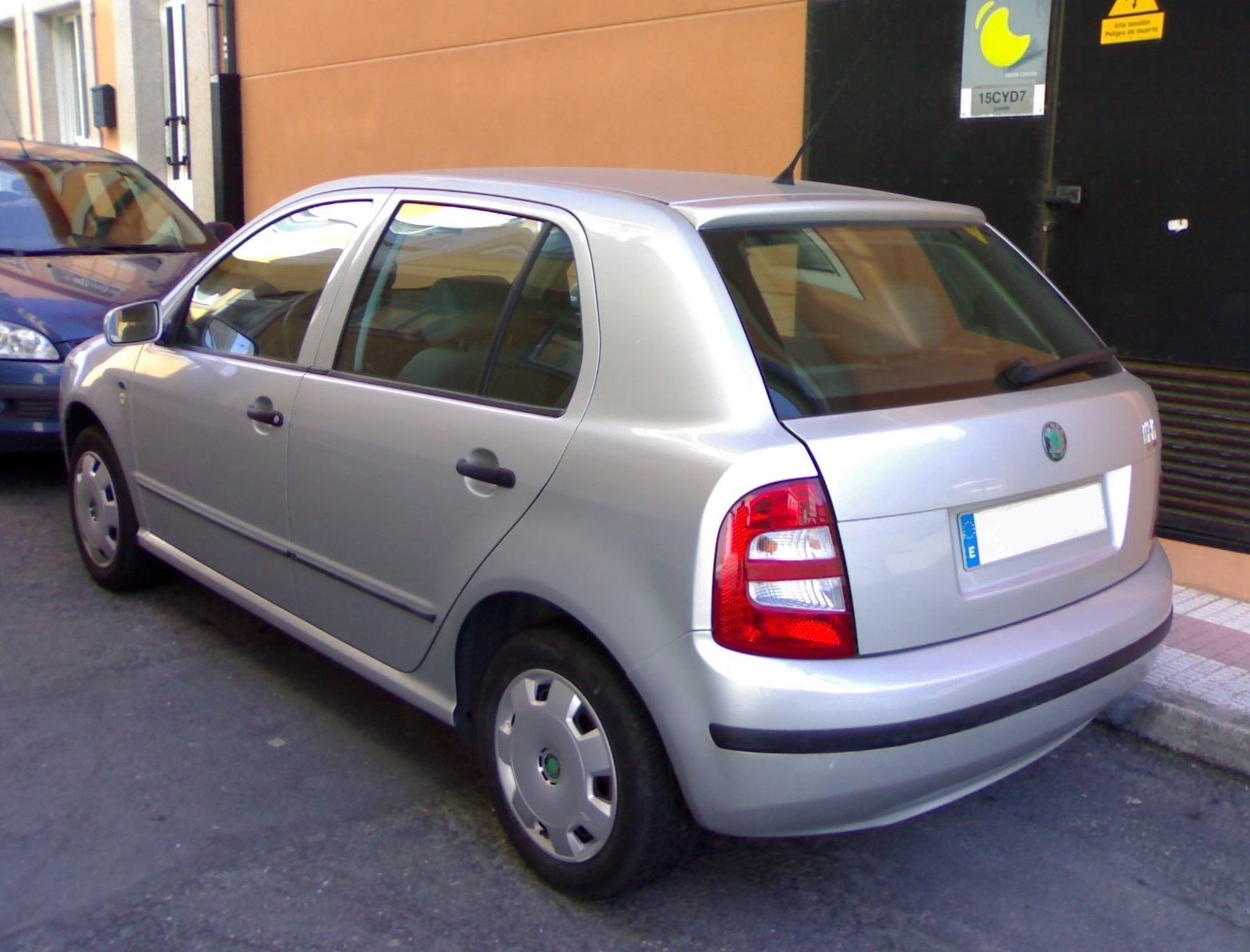
Hatchback (pre-facelift)

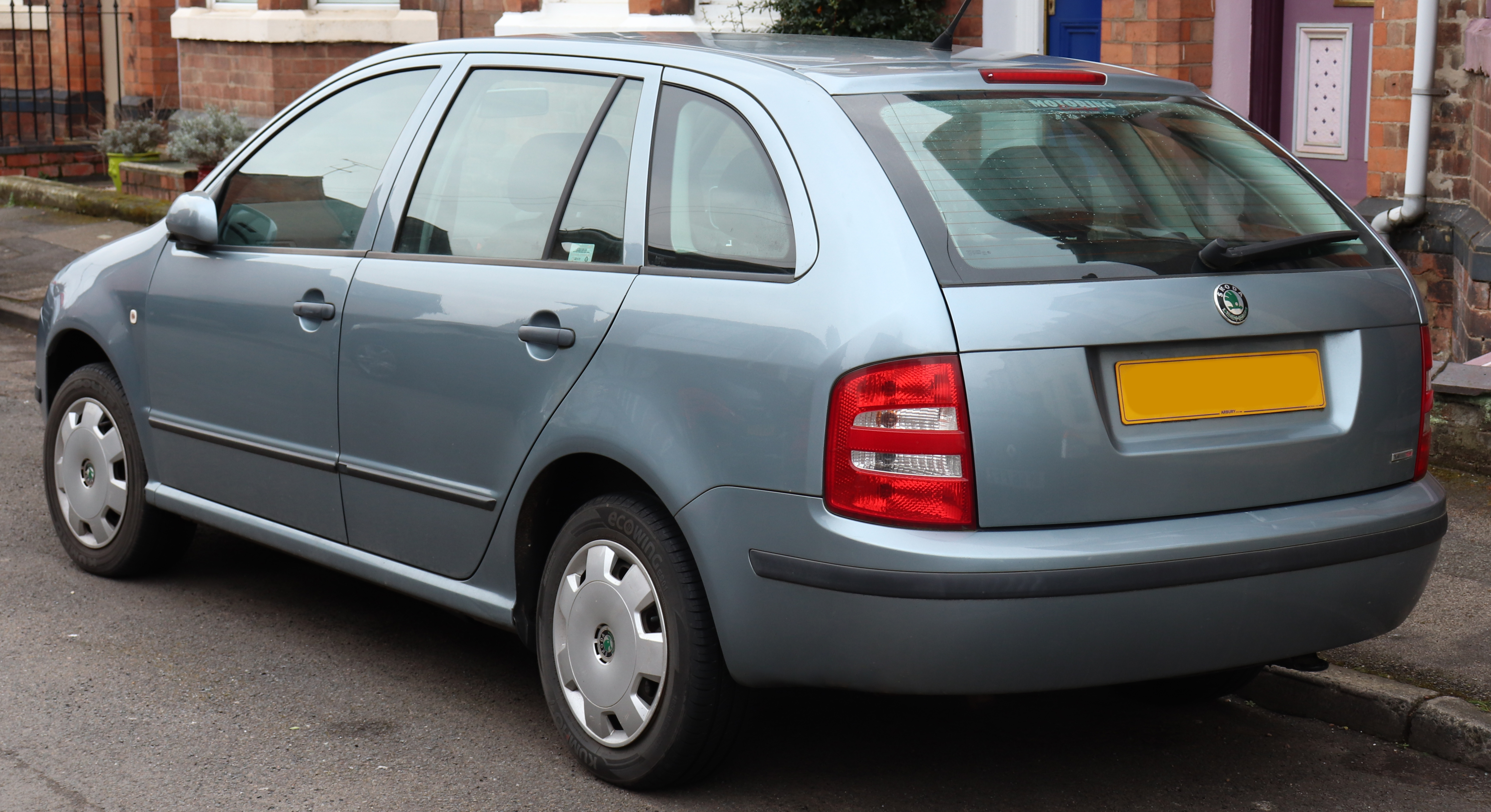
Combi (pre-facelift)

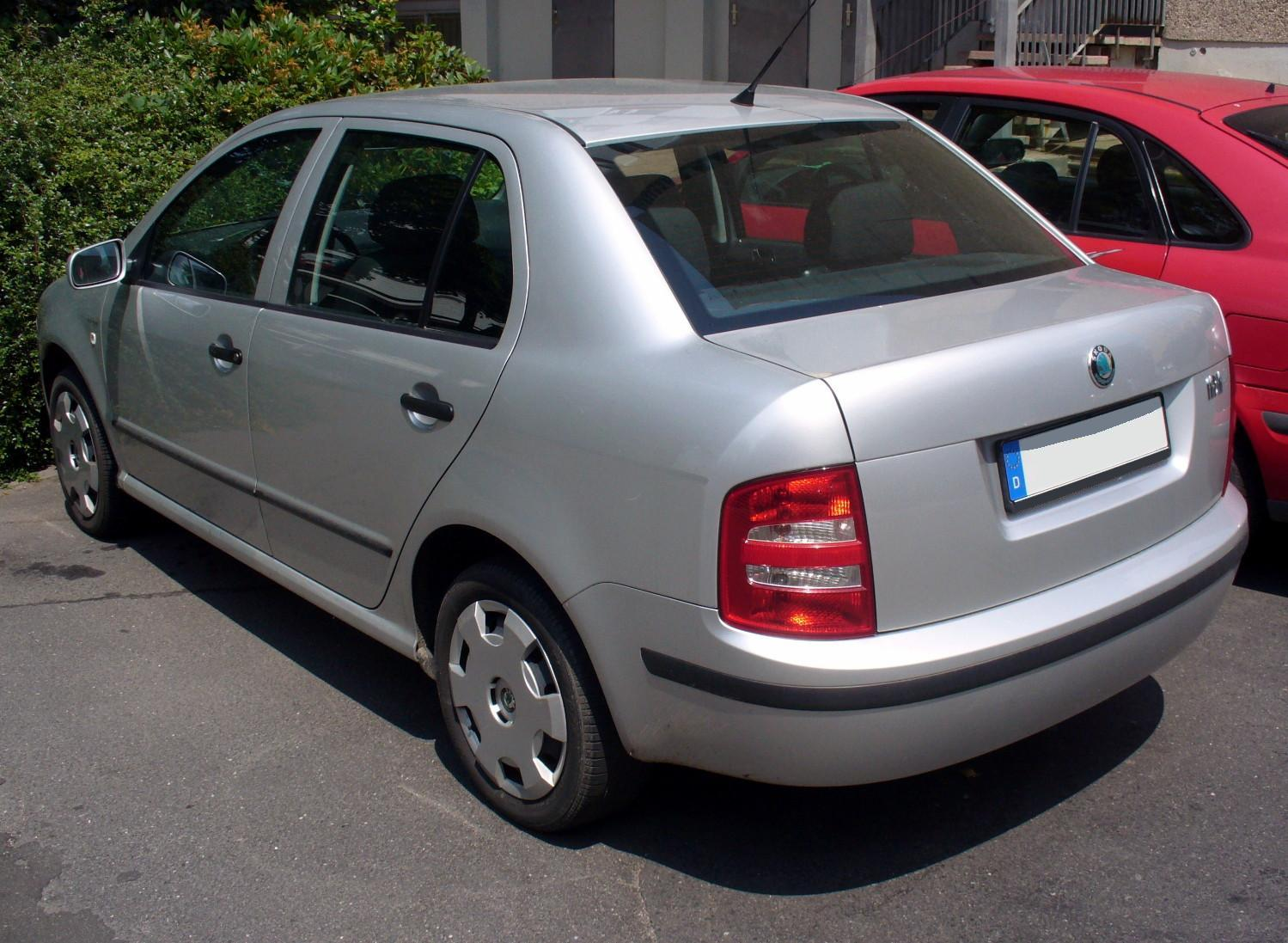
Saloon (pre-facelift)

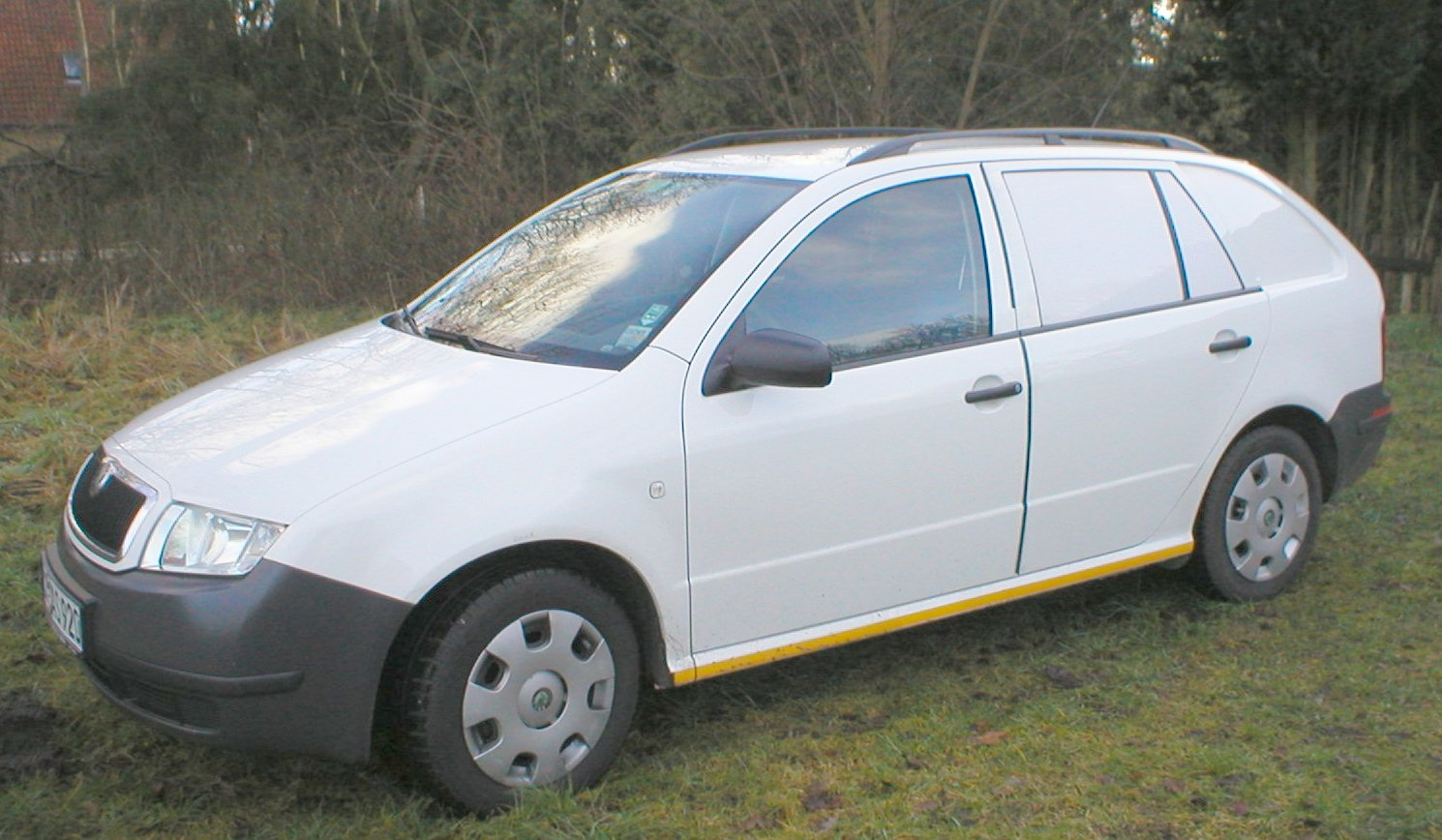
Fabia Praktik; a panel van variant for Eastern Europe

In the summer of 2004 the Fabia received a facelift, with changed front fog lights and grille, slightly different rear lights, new steering wheel and revised specification levels. The RS also had its final gearbox ratio changed. Most importantly, the Sport model was added, with the 55 kW (75 PS) 1.4 petrol being offered with a manual transmission. This engine was quickly swapped to the 1.2 HTP for the Fabia Sport; while not as powerful, it was a much more free revving engine, giving a more sporty feel and flexible drive. The Sport also had its specification changed to include red seat belts and sunset privacy glass from the B pillar to the rear.

Again in 2006, the Fabia range was shown at the Geneva Motor Show had minor specification revisions. These include a centre rear headrest, a central three-point seatbelt and an additional four bodywork colours. The 1.4 16v 55 kW (75 PS) petrol engine was replaced with a more powerful 1.4 16v 59 kW (80 PS) engine.

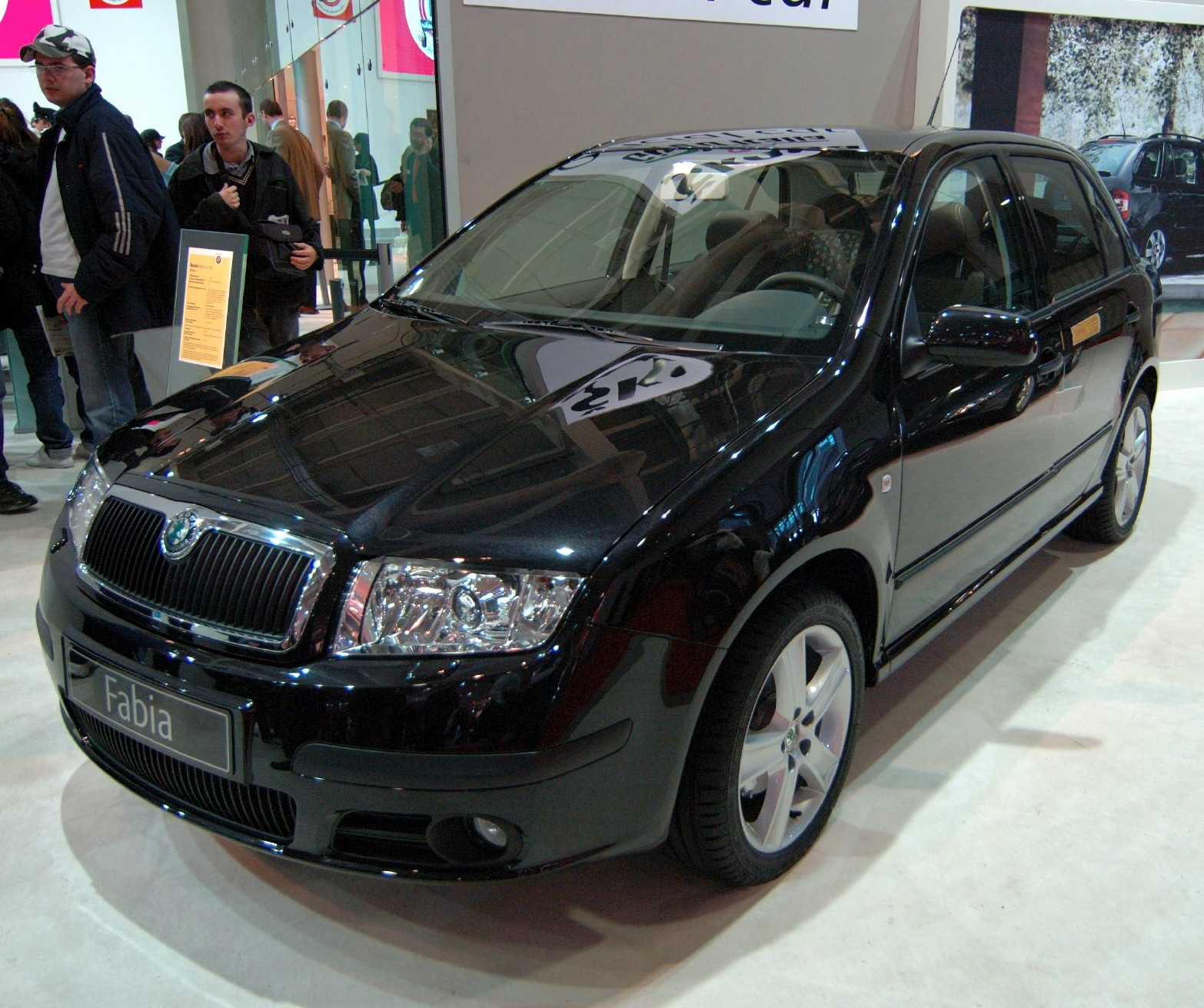
Facelift model (hatchback)

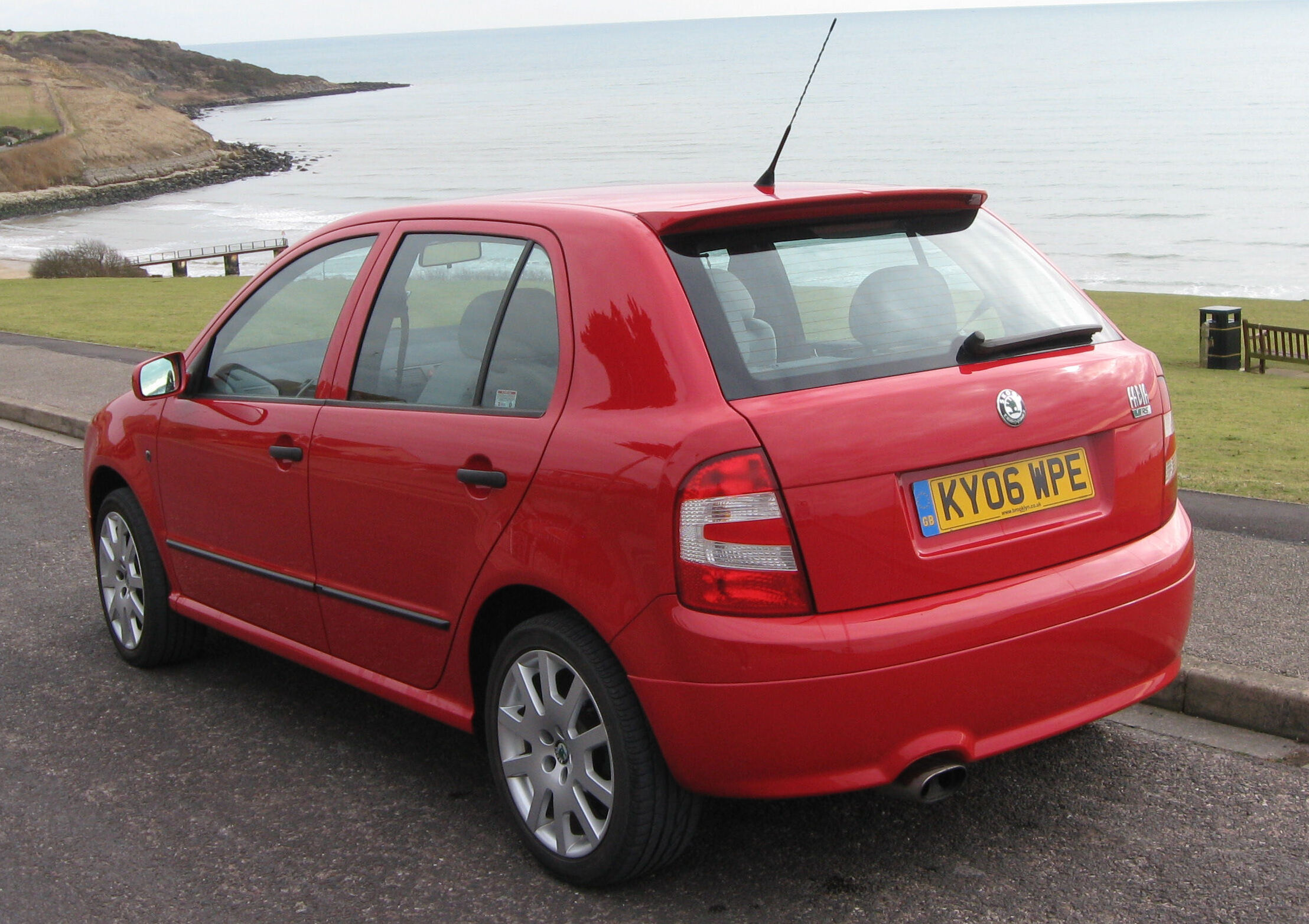
Fabia vRS hatchback (facelift; rear view)

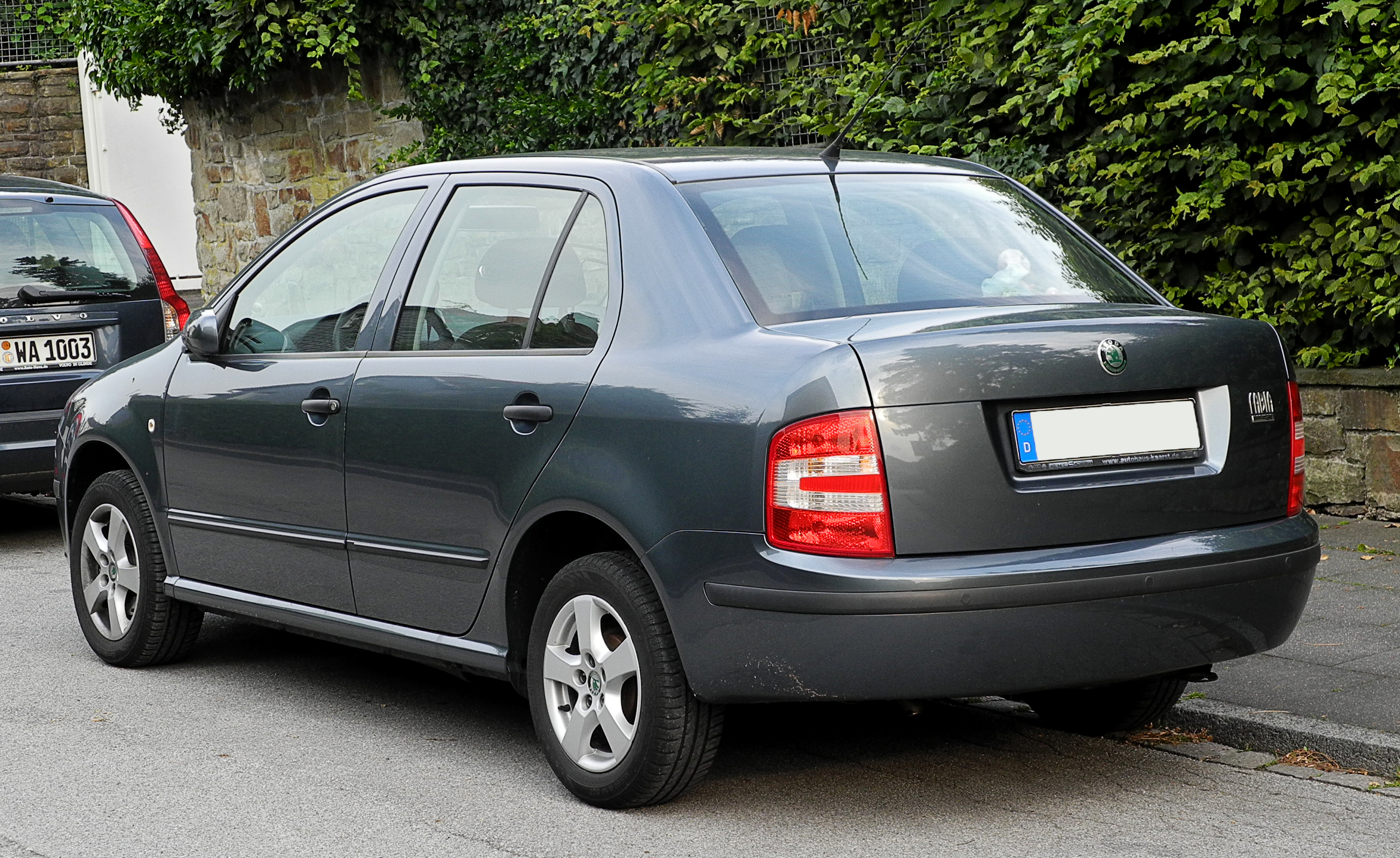
Saloon (facelift; rear view)

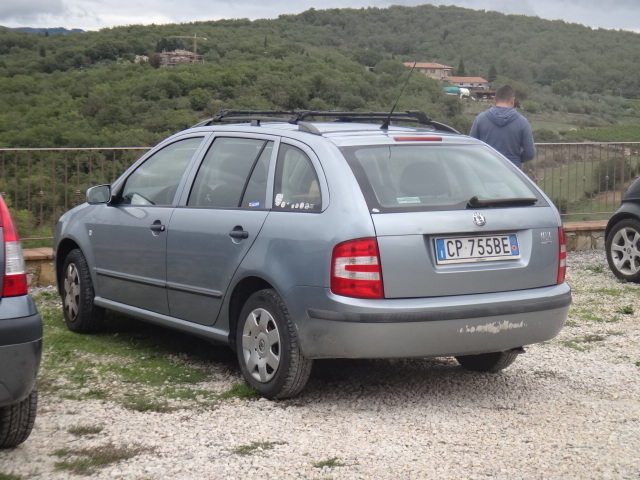
Ludospace (facelift; rear view)

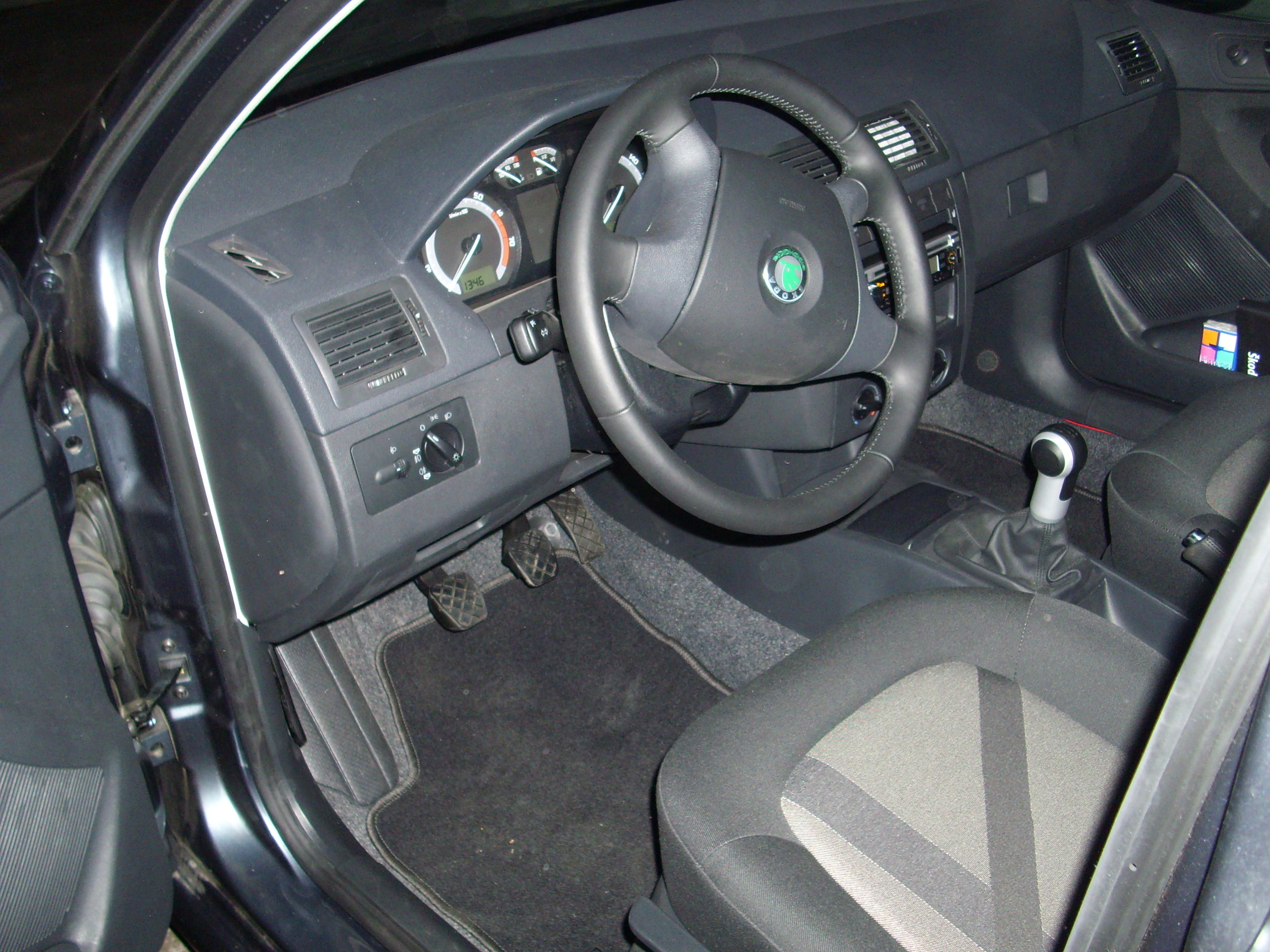
Interior (facelift)

=== Trim levels ===
At launch, the Fabia was available in three trim levels: Classic, Comfort, and Elegance. Later in the Fabia's life the mid-range Comfort model was dropped for the name Ambiente to fit in with the rest of the range. Other models available throughout the car's lifespan included Ambiente SE, Blackline, Silverline, Sport, Bohemia (estate only, run-out model) and RS. Various safety features and minor changes were made over time. Easy and Junior models were sold in Eastern European markets where the buying power is lower. Some of these Fabias do not have painted bumpers, side mirrors or gloveboxes. The Junior didn't have power steering and the steering wheel was 'borrowed' from Octavia I. Because of that, it was slightly bigger, with a diameter of 380 mm instead of the regular 370 mm found on all the other Fabia models. Also sold in such markets is the Fabia Praktik, which is a panel van version of the Fabia with the rear windows and seats removed. A less powerful version of the 1.4 MPI with just 44 kW (60 PS) was also sold in Eastern Europe.

=== Fabia RS ===
Introduced in 2003, the Fabia RS (vRS in the UK), while not the first diesel hot hatch, was the first exclusively diesel hot hatch, having no petrol equivalent. The engine is Volkswagen Group's 1.9-litre Pumpe-Düse Turbocharged Direct Injection diesel engine, producing 96 kW (130 PS) and 310 N⋅m (229 lb⋅ft) at 1900 rpm, with a six-speed manual gearbox. It was named the "Diesel Car of the Year 2003" in the Scottish Car of the Year Awards. It also falls in a low tax band (Band C) in the UK, further increasing its cost benefits over its (chiefly petrol-powered) counterparts.

Official figures state 0 to 100 km/h (62 mph) takes 9.6 seconds, but several motoring magazines and websites have measured faster times (around the 7.0–7.5 seconds range) (Autocar: 7.1 seconds, Auto Express: 8.1 seconds, and FastHatchbacks.com: 8.5 seconds). The in gear acceleration times are 50–70 mph in 5.6 seconds, quicker than BMW's 330i which takes 6.0 seconds. 20–40 mph in 2.4 seconds is as quick as the Lotus Elise 111R. Despite this the Fabia RS can achieve better than 6.2 L/100 km (46 mpg_{‑imp}; 38 mpg_{‑US}). The Fabia RS has a top speed of 128 mph (206 km/h).

The RS was shown to be quicker than a similarly priced MINI Cooper around Top Gear's and Fifth Gear's test tracks.

For the UK market in 2007, 1,000 Special Edition Fabia vRS models were produced featuring individually numbered black leather seats with blue piping, sporty red brake callipers, "Race Blue" metallic paint, cruise control, darkened rear windows and a six CD autochanger. This model was known as the Fabia vRS SE.

The last Mk1 Fabia RS came off the production line in March 2007 – being UK 2007/07 registered.

According to Škoda UK, there were only 22 of these 2007 registered marks (not including the 1000 Special Edition RS SEs).

=== Safety ===
Euro NCAP test results* Škoda Fabia 1.4 Classic (LHD) (2000)
| Test | Score | Rating |
|---|---|---|
| Adult occupant: | 26 | 4 /5 stars |
| Pedestrian: | 12 | 2 /4 stars |

=== Engines ===
The term MPI (Multi-Point Injection) is used by Škoda to differentiate from 16v models and (in the case of the Octavia Mk2) FSI engines. The 55 kW (75 PS) version of the 1.4 16v was only mated to Volkswagen's four-speed automatic transmission with fuzzy logic operation until the addition of earlier Sport models which mated it with a manual transmission. The 1.4 8v was dropped in 2003. The Fabia's overall performance and fuel consumption figures fall behind other city cars and small family cars as it is larger and heavier. However, the 1.2 HTP (High Torque Performance) engine was developed by Škoda specifically for the Fabia and offers better performance and fuel economy, and was later used in Volkswagen's own Polo due to its high acclaim. The four-valve, twin cam version of the HTP became available at the beginning of 2003 and was, unlike the single-cam version, also available on the saloon and Combi. It was also the highest displacement three-cylinder petrol engine until 2014 and BMW's 1.5-litre turbo engine.

| Model | Years | Engine and code | | Displ. | Power | Torque |
Petrol
| 1.0 8V | 1999–2000 | I4 | AQV/ATY/ARV | 997 cc | 37 kW (50 PS; 50 hp) at 5000 rpm | 84 N⋅m (62 lb⋅ft) at 2750 rpm |
| 1.2 MPI/HTP 6V | 2002–2007 | I3 | AWY/BMD | 1198 cc | 40 kW (54 PS; 54 hp) at 4750 rpm | 108 N⋅m (80 lb⋅ft) at 3000 rpm |
| 1.2 HTP 12V | 2003–2007 | I3 | AZQ/BME | 1198 cc | 47 kW (64 PS; 63 hp) at 5400 rpm | 112 N⋅m (83 lb⋅ft) at 3000 rpm |
| 1.4 MPI | 2000–2003 | I4 | AZE/AZF | 1397 cc | 44 kW (60 PS; 59 hp) at 5000 rpm | 118 N⋅m (87 lb⋅ft) at 2600 rpm |
| 1.4 MPI | 1999–2003 | I4 | AME/AQW/ATZ | 1397 cc | 50 kW (68 PS; 67 hp) at 5000 rpm | 120 N⋅m (89 lb⋅ft) at 2500 rpm |
| 1.4 16V | 2000–2007 | I4 | APE/AUA/BBY/BKY | 1390 cc | 55 kW (75 PS; 74 hp) at 5000 rpm | 126 N⋅m (93 lb⋅ft) at 3800 rpm |
| 1.4 16V | 2006–2007 | I4 | BUD | 1390 cc | 59 kW (80 PS; 79 hp) at 5000 rpm | 132 N⋅m (97 lb⋅ft) at 3800 rpm |
| 1.4 16V | 1999–2007 | I4 | AUB/BBZ | 1390 cc | 74 kW (101 PS; 99 hp) at 6000 rpm | 126 N⋅m (93 lb⋅ft) at 4400 rpm |
| 2.0 8V | 1999–2000 | I4 | ATF | 1984 cc | 88 kW (120 PS; 118 hp) at 5600 rpm | 174 N⋅m (128 lb⋅ft) at 2400 rpm |
| 2.0 8V | 2000–2007 | I4 | AZL/BBX | 1984 cc | 85 kW (115 PS; 113 hp) at 5200 rpm | 170 N⋅m (130 lb⋅ft) at 2400 rpm |
Diesel
| 1.4 TDI 6V | 2005–2007 | I3 | BNM | 1422 cc | 51 kW (69 PS; 68 hp) at 4000 rpm | 155 N⋅m (114 lb⋅ft) at 1600–2800 rpm |
| 1.4 TDI 6V | 2003–2005 | I3 | AMF | 1422 cc | 55 kW (75 PS; 74 hp) at 4000 rpm | 195 N⋅m (144 lb⋅ft) at 2200 rpm |
| 1.4 TDI 6V | 2005–2008 | I3 | BNV | 1422 cc | 59 kW (80 PS; 79 hp) at 4000 rpm | 195 N⋅m (144 lb⋅ft) at 2200 rpm |
| 1.9 SDI 8V | 1999–2006 | I4 | ASY | 1896 cc | 47 kW (64 PS; 63 hp) at 4000 rpm | 125 N⋅m (92 lb⋅ft) at 1600–2800 rpm |
| 1.9 TDI PD 8V | 2000–2007 | I4 | ATD/AXR | 1896 cc | 74 kW (100 PS; 99 hp) at 4000 rpm | 240 N⋅m (177 lb⋅ft) at 1800–2400 rpm |
| 1.9 TDI PD 8V RS | 2003–2007 | I4 | ASZ/BLT | 1896 cc | 96 kW (130 PS; 128 hp) at 4000 rpm | 310 N⋅m (229 lbf⋅ft) at 1900 rpm |

== Second generation (Type 5J; 2007) ==
Škoda Fabia Mk2
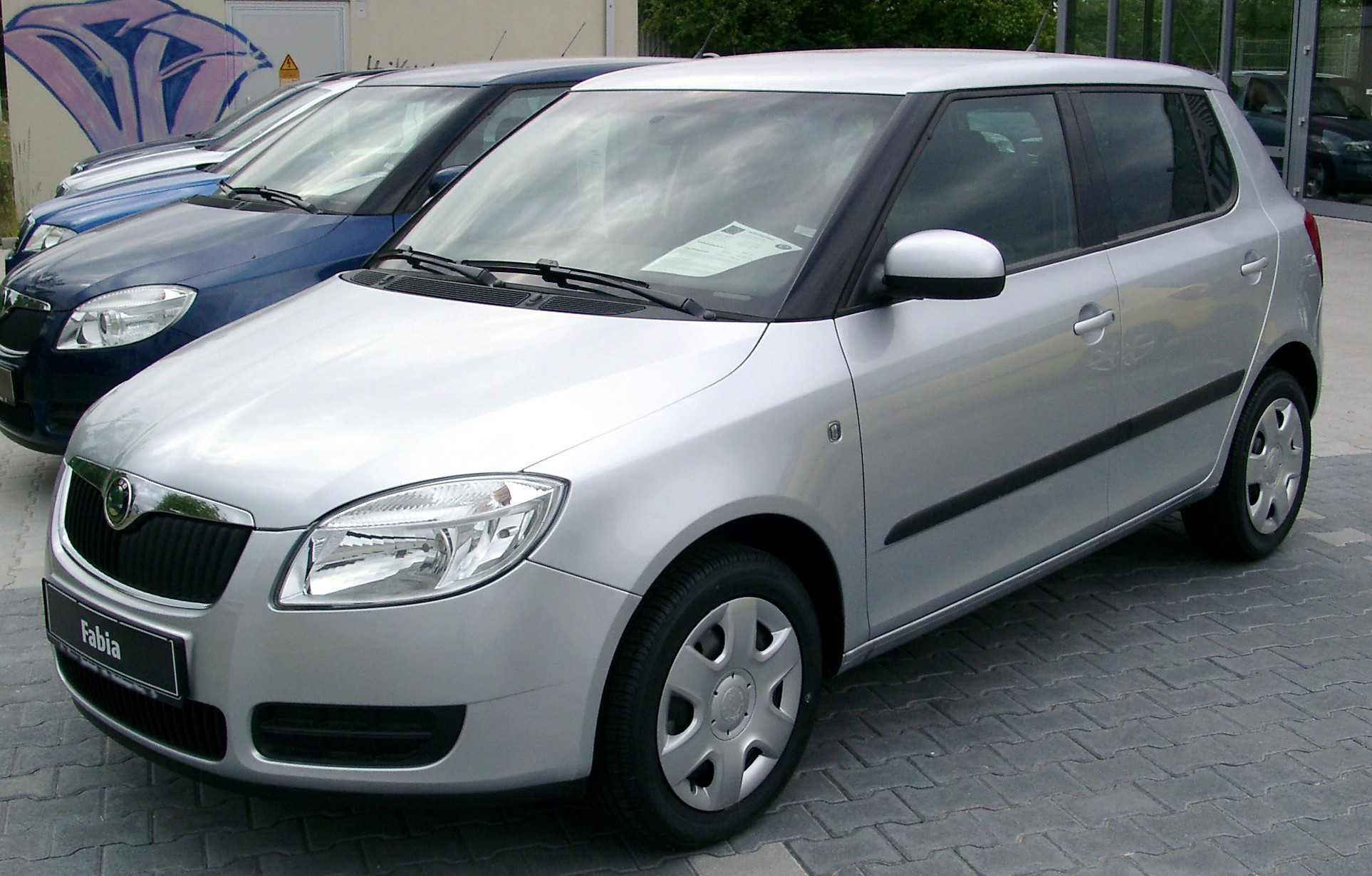

Overview
- Model code: Typ 5J
- Also called: Škoda Fabia Jingrui (China); Škoda Fabia 5J (Ukraine, until 4/2010); Škoda Fabia MG (Ukraine, since 4/2010)
- Production: April 2007 – June 2014
- Assembly: Mladá Boleslav, Czech Republic; Aurangabad, India (Škoda India, until 31 August 2013); Oskemen, Kazakhstan (Azia Avto); Anting, China (SVW); Solomonovo, Ukraine (Eurocar); Kaluga, Russia

Body and chassis
- Body style: 5-door hatchback 5-door estate
- Layout: Front-engine, front-wheel-drive
- Platform: Volkswagen Group A04 (PQ24) platform
- Related: Škoda Rapid (India); Škoda Roomster; SEAT Ibiza Mk3; SEAT Córdoba Mk2; Volkswagen Polo Mk4

Powertrain
- Engine: Petrol: 1.2 L EA111 MPI I3 6V; 1.2 L EA111 MPI I3 12V; 1.2 L EA111 I4 TSI 8V; 1.4 L EA111 MPI I4 16V; 1.4 L CAVE I4 16V TSI (vRS only); 1.6 L EA111 MPI I4 16V; Diesel: 1.2 L EA189 I3 12V TDI CR; 1.4 L BNM I3 6V TDI PD; 1.4 L BNV I3 6V TDI PD; 1.6 L CAYA I4 TDI CR; 1.6 L CAYB I4 TDI CR; 1.6 L CAYC I4 TDI CR; 1.9 L BSW I4 TDI PD
- Transmission: 5-speed manual 6-speed manual 6-speed automatic 7-speed automatic DSG

Dimensions
- Wheelbase: 2,460 mm (96.9 in)
- Length: 4,000 mm (157.5 in) (hatchback); 4,247 mm (167.2 in) (estate)
- Width: 1,642 mm (64.6 in)
- Height: 1,498 mm (59.0 in)
- Curb weight: 1,030–1,180 kg (2,270–2,600 lb) (RS 1390 kg)

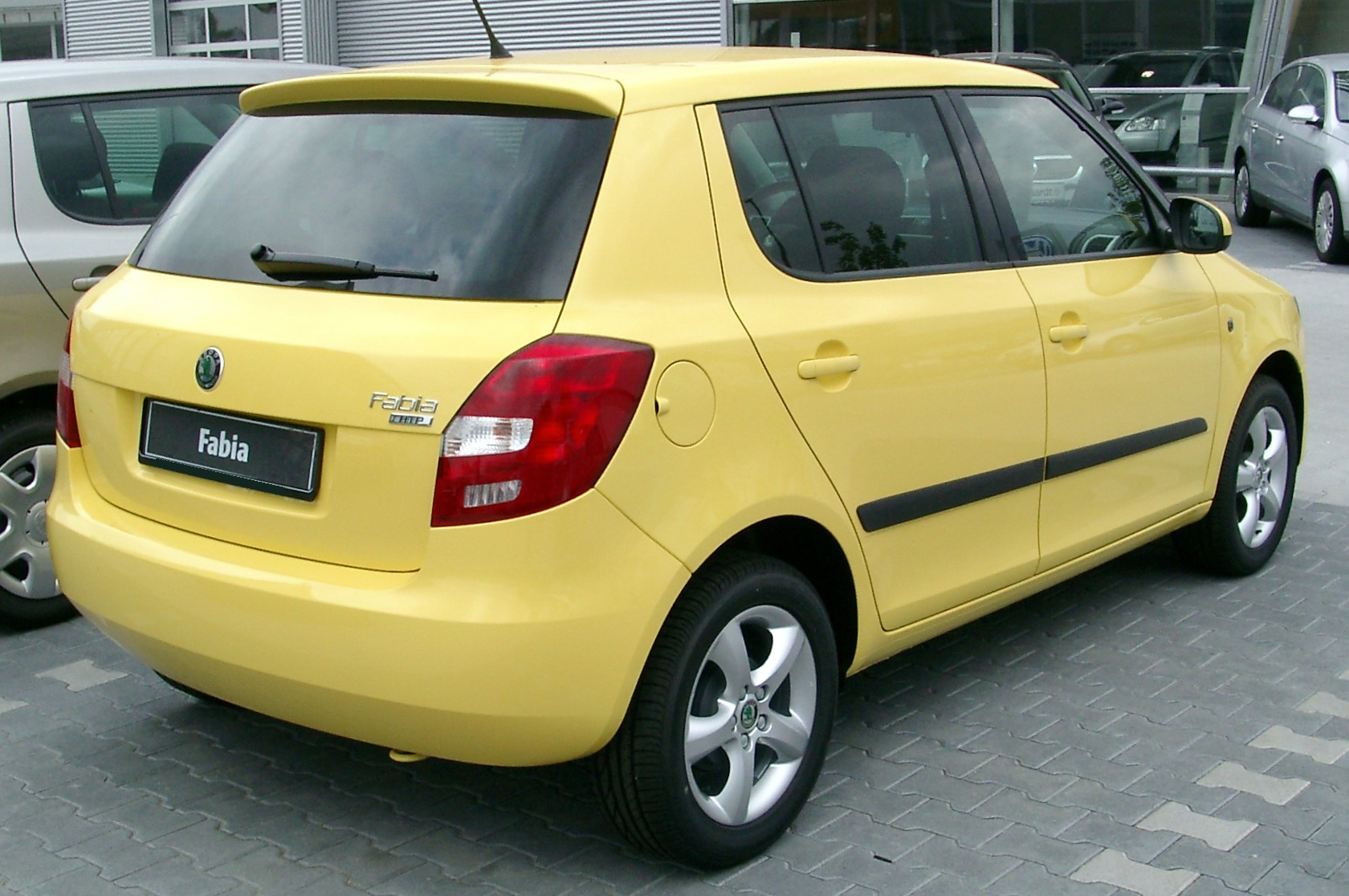
Hatchback (pre-facelift)

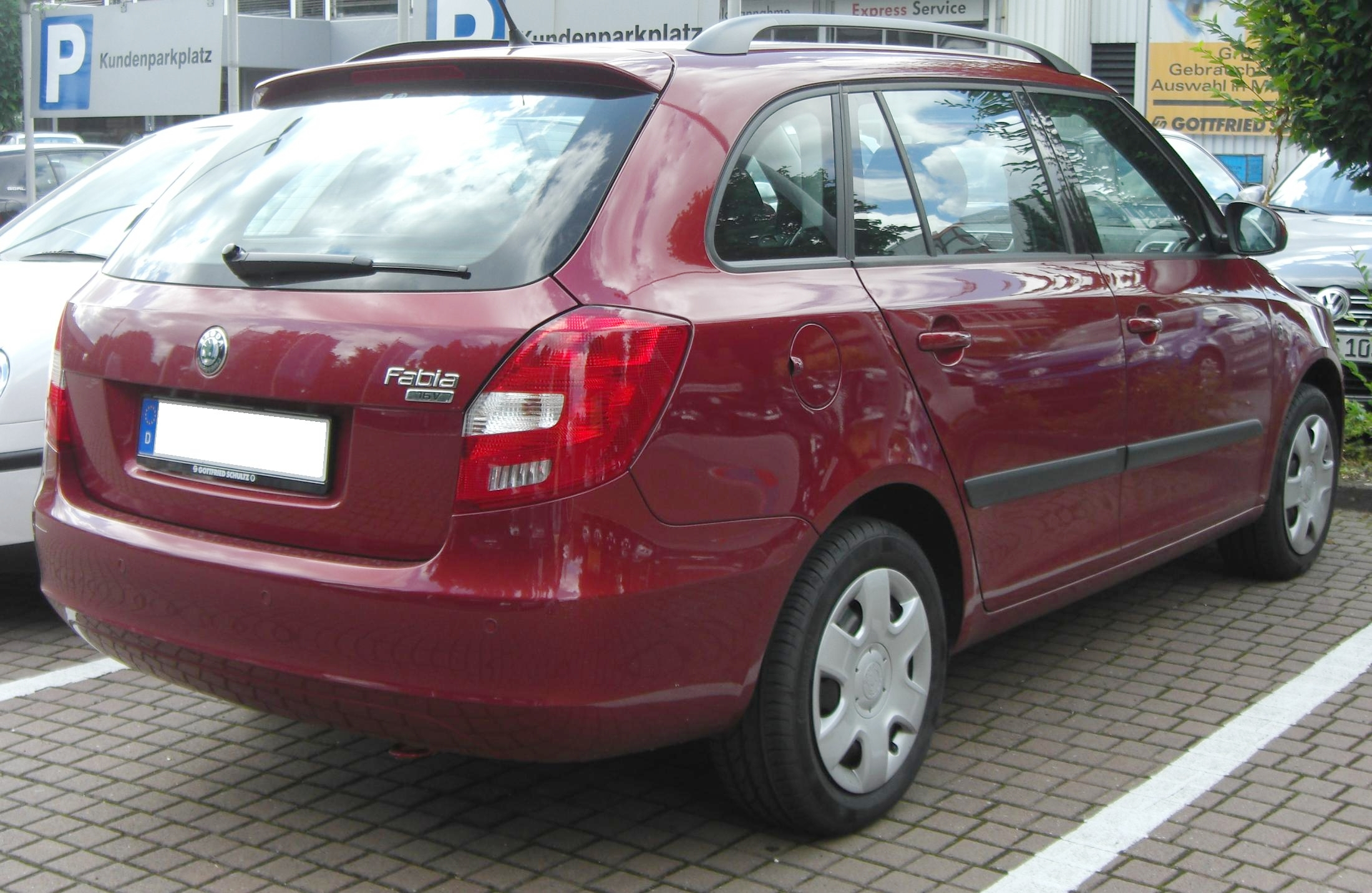
Combi (pre-facelift)

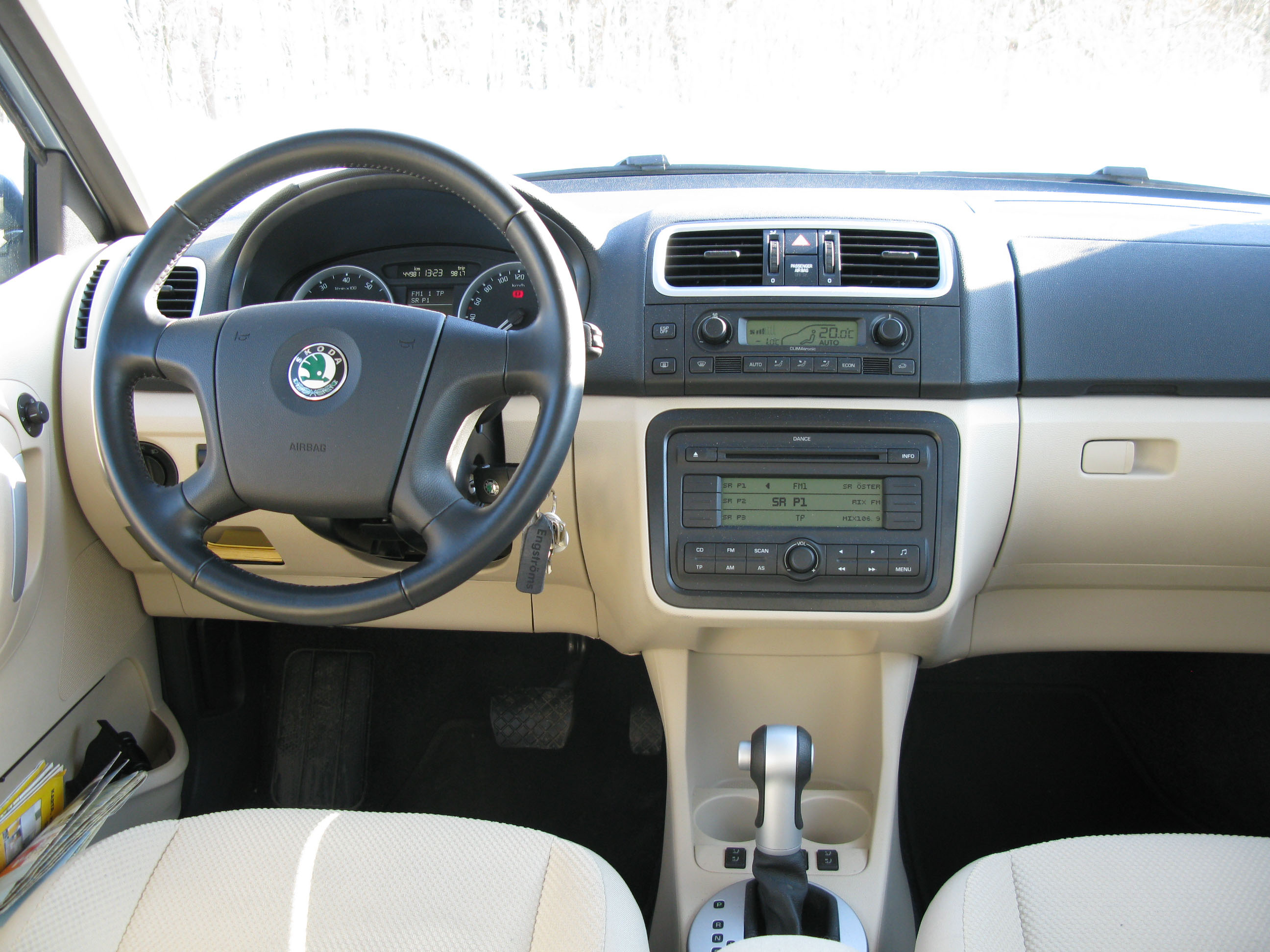
Interior

The second generation Fabia (internal type code 5J) was officially presented at the Geneva Auto Show in March 2007 and was sold from April 2007. It still uses the PQ24 platform. The car is however slightly larger than its predecessor and takes styling cues from the Roomster, Škoda's small MPV. The exterior of the two cars, Roomster and Fabia, were designed simultaneously to create synergies by Thomas Ingenlath and Peter Wouda.

The estate variant was officially announced in August 2007 and was introduced at the Frankfurt Motor Show in September 2007. Compared with the first generation the new Combi is 7 mm (0.3 in) longer, 46 mm (1.8 in) higher and the boot has grown by 54 litres (to 480 litres total). The engine portfolio is the same as the hatchback version, without the 1.2 44 kW one.

The initial petrol engine line-up was a mixture of newer engines from Audi and some carry-overs from the outgoing model. In comparison to the 1st-generation Fabia, both basic 1.2-litre 3-cylinders gained 4 kW each: new power peak was 44 kW (60 PS), and 51 kW (70 PS). There was only a single 1.4-litre 16v petrol on this model, producing 63 kW (86 PS). The range-topping petrol engine was the 1.6-litre 4-cylinder with variable valve timing producing 77 kW (105 hp). There was also an option to mate this engine with a 6-speed tiptronic transmission sourced from Aisin.

The diesel range featured the same 51 kW (70 PS) and 59 kW (80 PS) 1.4-litre Pumpe-Düse 3-cylinders from the predecessor model. The top-of-the-range diesel was a 1.9-litre Pumpe-Düse 4-cylinder producing 77 kW (105 PS).

The second generation Fabia trim levels were Classic, Ambiente, Sport and Elegance. In the UK the trim levels were called 1, 2, Sport, 3, and GreenLine (later S, SE, Elegance, and GreenLine). In India, the trim levels were Active, Classic, Ambiente and Elegance. All models sold within the EU were equipped with ABS, front passenger, driver and side airbags. Curtain airbags and ESC were available as an option.

Though the sedan body, and the VRS version were discontinued (the latter until facelift in 2010), the 2nd-generation Fabia offered variety of new choices. The GreenLine model was the most environmentally-friendly Fabia, with 59 kW 1.4-litre diesel 3-cylinder consuming 4.1 L/100 km, which is 109 g of CO_{2} per km. At the Frankfurt International Motor Show (IAA) 2007 Škoda presented near-production-state design study of the Fabia Scout: a rugged version of the Fabia Combi. However, it was until May 2009 when this car finally started to roll off the production line in Mladá Boleslav. The new-generation Fabia featured a specific design element: a roof in different colour than the rest of the body was available as an option.

=== Facelift ===
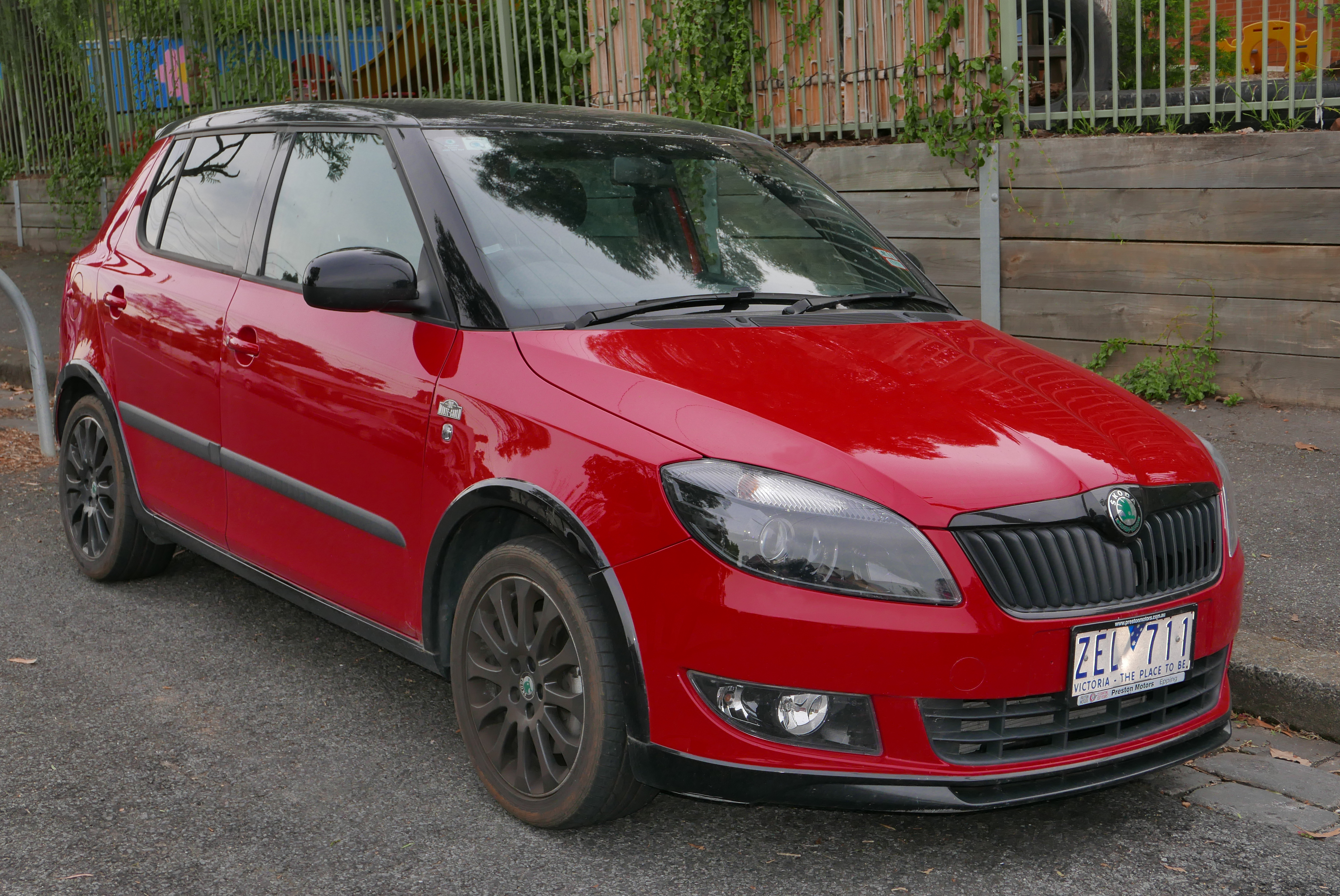

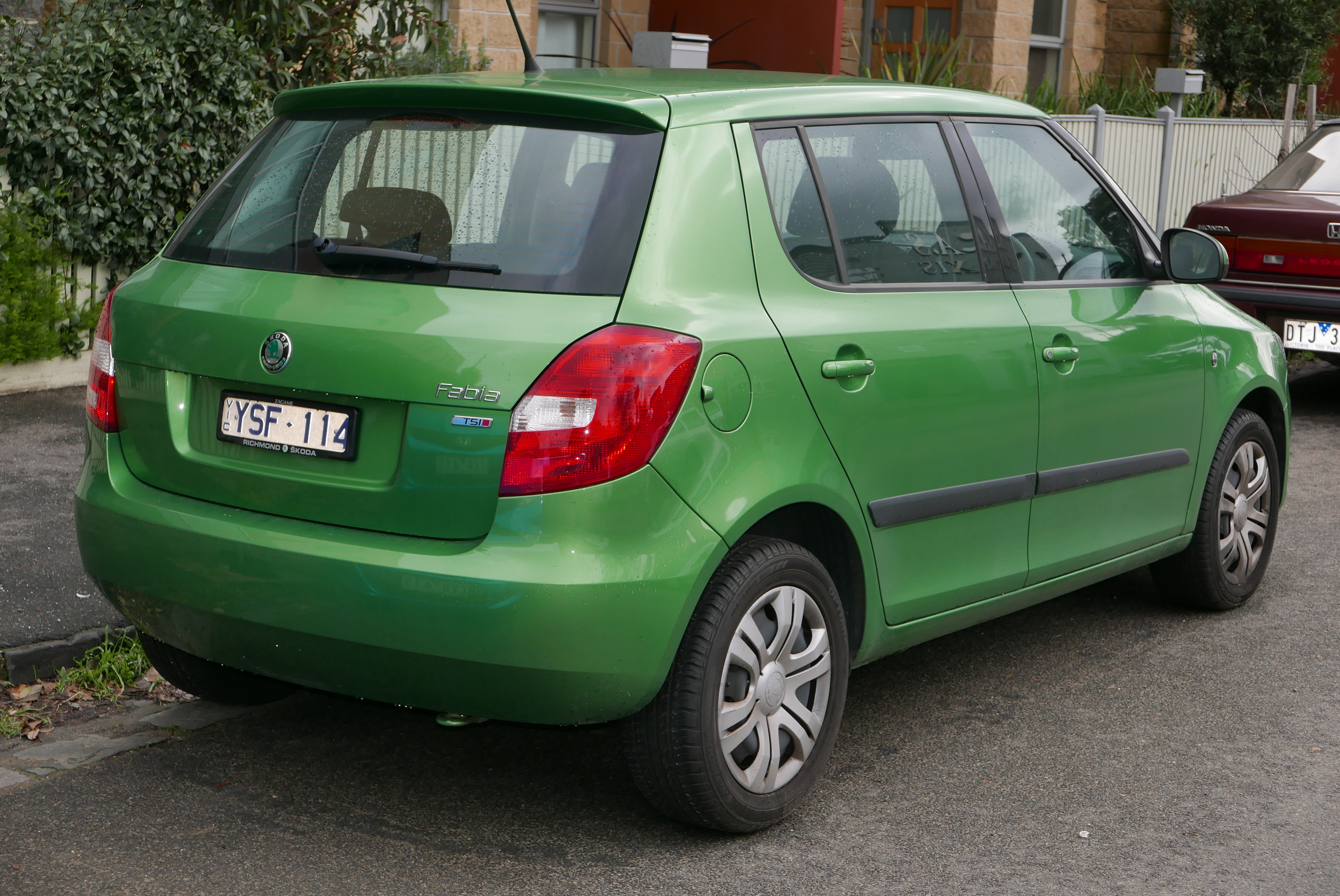
Hatch (facelift)

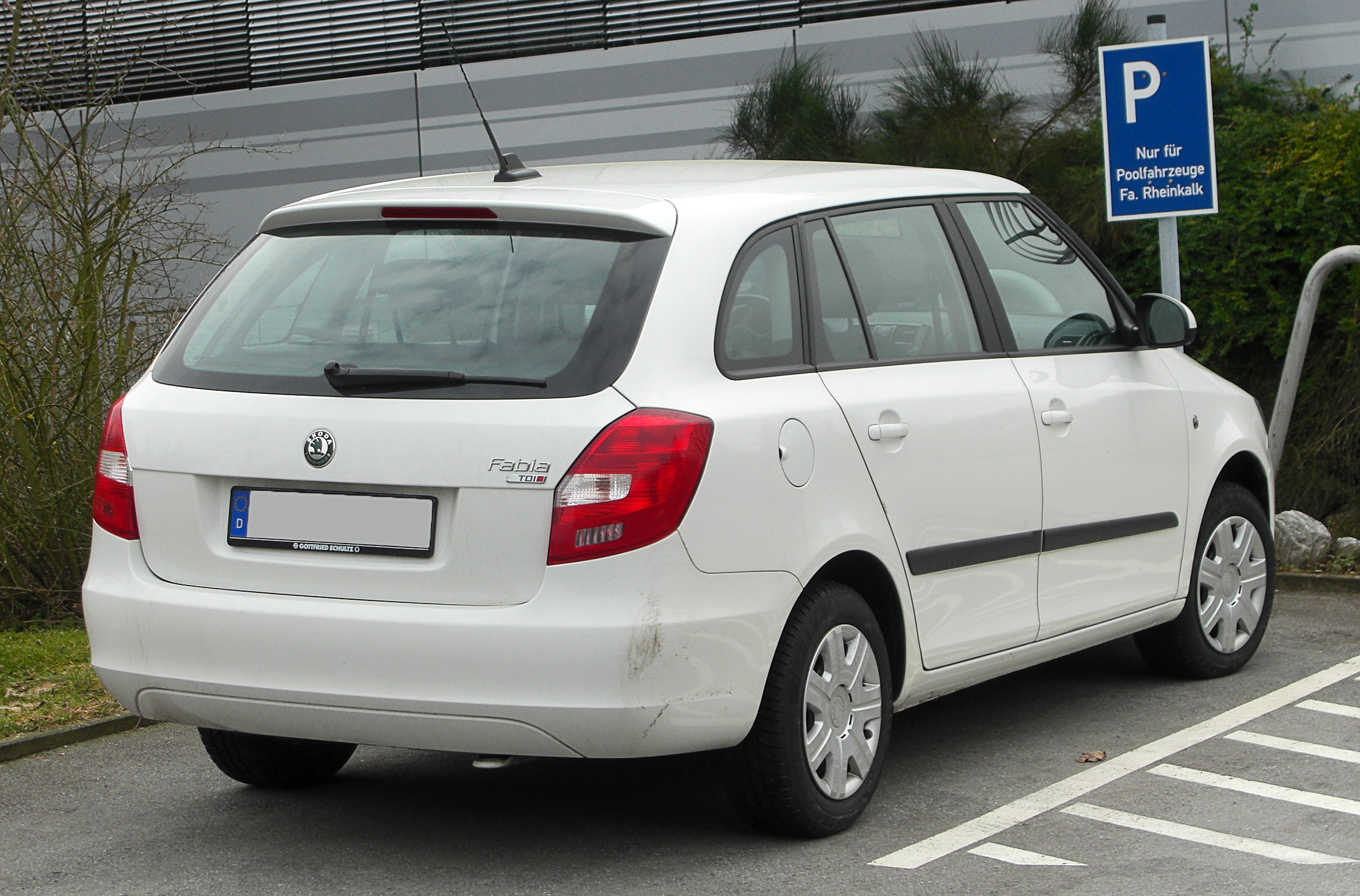
Combi (facelift)

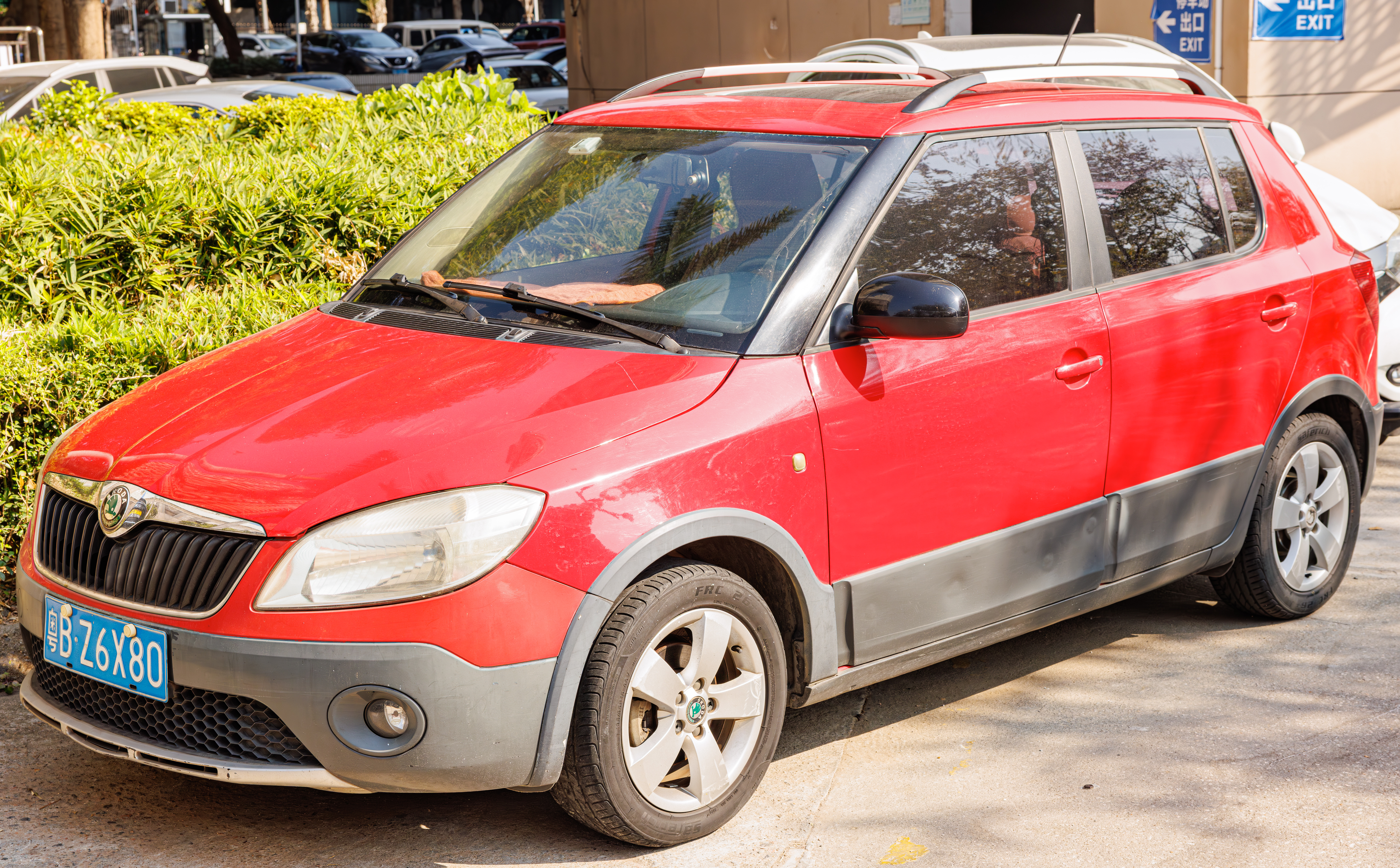

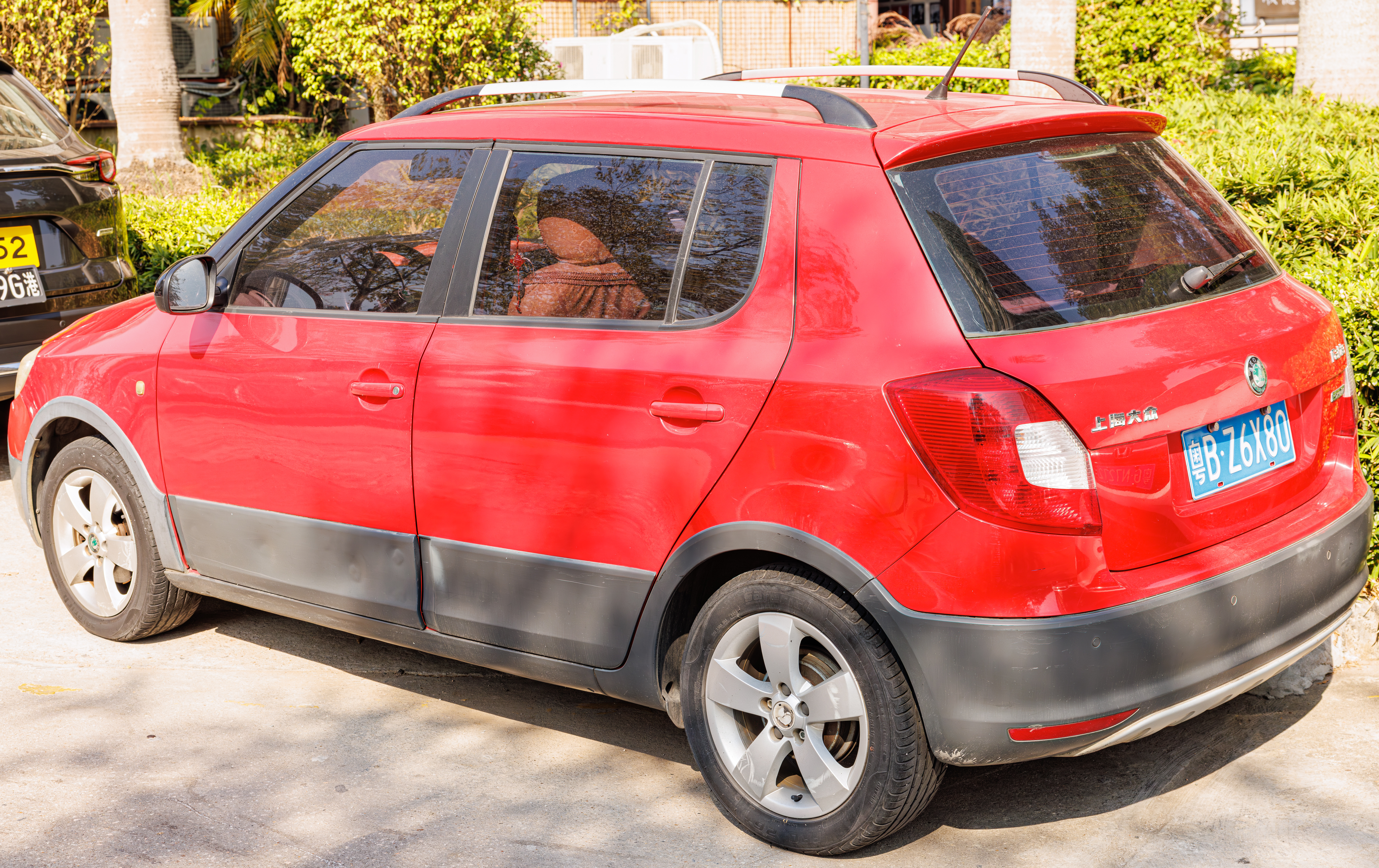
Scout (facelift, China)

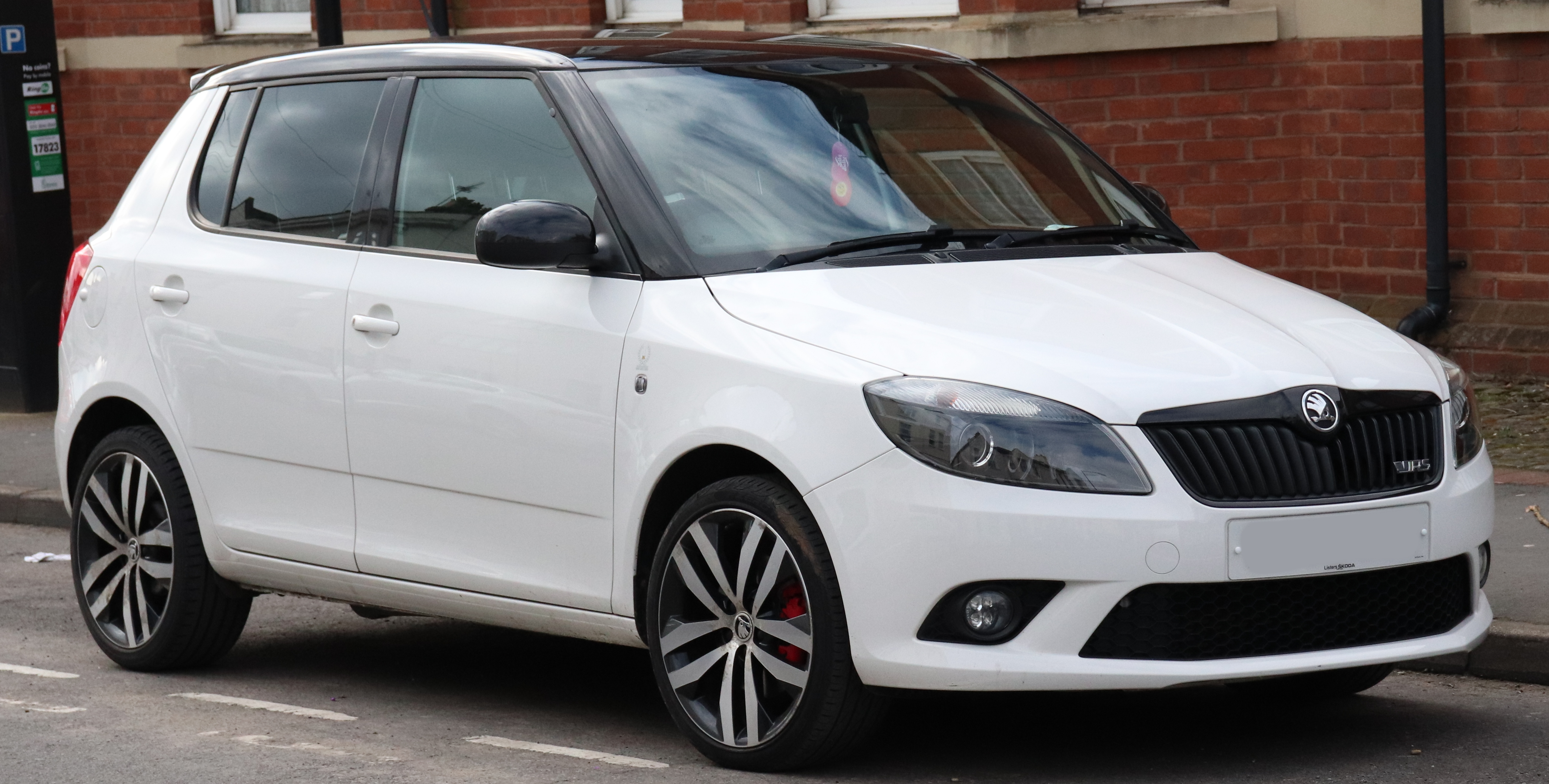
Post-facelift Skoda Fabia 1.4 VRS

The facelifted Fabia and Fabia Combi (estate/wagon) were premiered at the 2010 Geneva Motor Show. The updated version can be easily distinguished from prior versions by the different shape of the front bumper and front fog lights. The facelift to the second-generation Fabia also brought Xenon headlights as standard on higher end models. Inside, new steering wheels were a noticeable difference. Though their shape remained the same, headlights with a projector module underwent technical changes: for full beam, a separate reflector is fitted on the inner side of the lamp, while the projector module (providing a dimmed beam) is on the outer side.

The engine line-up was updated along with a facelift, too. 1.2-litre TSI turbocharged petrol engines came as a replacement of the previous 1.4 and 1.6-litre MPI engines, providing significant improvements to fuel consumption and corresponding reductions in CO_{2} emissions. The Aisin automatic transmission previously used was also replaced with the 7-speed DSG dual-clutch gearbox (optional on 77 kW (105 PS; 103 hp) 1.2 TSI models), providing a reduction of over 30% in CO_{2} emissions for the 77 kW (105 PS; 103 hp) automatic derivative (compared to the previous 1.6-litre). Diesel engines were updated to the common rail system and four-valve technology.

With the facelift a sports VRS version returned to the range, now available as both hatchback and estate. This model features the same 1.4-litre twin-charged petrol engine as the Volkswagen Polo Mk5 GTI, producing 132 kW (180 PS) and is mated with a 7-speed DSG dual-clutch transmission as standard. With top speed 226 km/h (Fabia Combi VRS), this is the fastest production Fabia ever. The VRS had its own version of the cake advertisement – "Mean Green", with a darker rock version of "My Favourite Things".

The GreenLine model received new technology, as well. Manufacturer's combined consumption for the Fabia GreenLine with brand-new 55 kW 1.2-litre 3-cylinder diesel engine is 3.4 L/100 km, which is 88 g CO_{2} per km. Gerhard Plattner, Austrian economy driver, managed to reach 2,006 km on a single tank of fuel, that is 2.21 L/100 km (127.8 mpg imp / 106.4 mpg US).

New to the lot was Monte Carlo version for both Fabia and Fabia Combi, using design features from the Škoda Fabia Sports Design Concept presented at 2009 Geneva Motor Show.

At the 30th Wörthersee GTI Treffen, Škoda revealed Fabia VRS 2000 design study based on Super 2000 rally car.

4 May 2012 Škoda produced 3-millionth Fabia.

In total, 1,790,900 1st-generation Fabia and 1,704,100 2nd-generation Fabias have been produced.

=== Marketing ===
==== United Kingdom ====
For the launch of the new Fabia, Škoda UK commissioned an advertising campaign called Cake, featuring the making of a Fabia car out of cake which swapped rivets for raisins, metal for marzipan and spark plugs for sugar.

==== China ====
Shanghai Volkswagen Automotive introduced the new Fabia to the public at the 2008 Guangzhou Motor Show. It was launched in China for the 2009 model year.

==== India ====
Škoda India launched the latest version of Fabia in 2008. The car was well praised by Indian motor magazines, but it couldn't live up to the hype created by the previous generation Octavia. Fabia has not succeeded in this market due to dealer problems, steep prices and Škoda trying to position itself as a luxury marque. Škoda India has decided to bring in more powerful engines at better prices and taken strict measures to improve dealer quality levels and curb excessive service costs.

=== Safety ===
Euro NCAP test results* Škoda Fabia (2007)
| Test | Score | Rating |
|---|---|---|
| Adult occupant: | 32 | 4 /5 stars |
| Child occupant: | 36 | 3 /5 stars |
| Pedestrian: | 17 | 2 /4 stars |

ANCAP test results* Skoda Fabia 5 door hatch (2008)
| Test | Score |
|---|---|
| Overall | 4 /5 stars |
| Frontal offset | 12.84/16 |
| Side impact | 15/16 |
| Pole | 2/2 |
| Seat belt reminders | 1/3 |
| Whiplash protection | Not Assessed |
| Pedestrian protection | Marginal |
| Electronic stability control | Standard |

=== Engines ===
The initial petrol engine lineup was a mixture of newer engines from Audi and some carry overs from the outgoing model. The base 1.2 remains the same (44 kW) while the higher powered version has its power output upped to 70 PS (51 kW). There was only a single 1.4-litre 16v petrol on this model, producing 85 PS (63 kW). The range topping petrol engine was the 1.6 16v engine producing 105 PS (77 kW) . There was also an option to link this engine to a six speed tiptronic transmission sourced from Aisin.

Diesel engines consisted of the same 70 PS (51 kW) and 80 PS (59 kW) 1.4 TDI units from before. The range topping diesel was a 1.9 TDI producing 105 PS (77 kW).

The top-of-the-line RS model (vRS in the UK) features the same 1.4-litre engine as the Volkswagen Polo Mk5 GTI, producing 180 PS (132 kW) and is fitted with a seven-speed DSG semi automatic transmission as standard. The vRS had its own version of the cake advertisement, with a darker rock version of "My Favorite Things".

Overview of engines available for the 2nd-generation Fabia (A05, Type 5J), incl. facelifted model.

Petrol engines

| Engine designation | Production | Engine code (family) | Displacement, configuration, valvetrain, fuel system, aspiration | Motive power at rpm | max. torque at rpm | Gearbox (type), drive | Top speed | 0–100 km/h [s] (0–62 mph) | Combined consumption [l/100 km / mpg imp / mpg US] | CO2 [g/km] |
|---|---|---|---|---|---|---|---|---|---|---|
| 1.2 MPI 44 kW | 2006–2010 | (EA111) | 1198 ccm, I3, 6V, OHC, MPI, naturally aspirated | 44 kW (60 PS; 59 hp) at 5200 rpm | 108 Nm. (80 lb•ft) at 3000 rpmm | 5-speed manual (MQ200), FWD | 155 km/h (96 mph) | 16.5 | 5.9 / 47.9 / 39.9 | 140 |
| 1.2 MPI 44 kW | 2010–2014 | CGPB (EA111) | 1198 ccm, I3, 12V, DOHC, MPI, naturally aspirated | 44 kW (60 PS; 59 hp) at 5200 rpm | 108 Nm. (80 lb•ft) at 3000 rpm | 5-speed manual (MQ200), FWD | 155 km/h (96 mph) | 16.5 | 5.5 / 51.4 / 42.8 | 128 |
| 1.2 MPI 51 kW | 2007–2014 | BZG/CGPA (EA111) | 1198 ccm, I3, 12V, OHC, MPI, naturally aspirated | 51 kW (70 PS; 68 hp)at 5400 rpm | 112 Nm. (83 lb•ft) at 3000 | 5-speed manual (MQ200), FWD | 163 km/h (101 mph) | 14.9 | 5.5 / 51.4 / 42.8 | 128 |
| 1.2 TSI 63 kW | 2010–2014 | CBZA (EA111) | 1197 ccm, I4, 8V, OHC, TSI, turbocharged | 63 kW (86 PS; 85 hp) at 4800 rpm | 160 Nm. (118 lb•ft) at 1500–3500 rpm | 5-speed manual (MQ200), FWD | 177 km/h (110 mph) | 11.7 | 5.2 / 54.3 / 45.2 | 121 |
| 1.2 TSI 77 kW | 2010–2014 | CBZB (EA111) | 1197 ccm, I4, 8V, OHC, TSI, turbocharged | 77 kW (105 PS; 103 hp) at 5000 rpm | 175 Nm. (129 lb•ft) at 1500–4100 | 5-speed manual (MQ200), FWD | 191 km/h (119 mph) | 10.1 | 5.3 / 53.3 / 44.4 | 124 |
| 1.2 TSI 77 kW | 2010–2014 | CBZB (EA111) | 1197 ccm, I4, 8V, OHC, TSI, turbocharged | 77 kW (105 PS; 103 hp) at 5000 rpm | 175 Nm. (129 lb•ft) at 1500–4100 | 7-speed automatic (DQ200), FWD | 189 km/h (117 mph) | 10.2 | 5.3 / 53.3 / 44.4 | 124 |
| 1.4 MPI 63 kW | 2007–2014 | (EA111) | 1390 ccm, I4, 16V, DOHC, MPI, naturally aspirated | 63 kW (86 PS; 85 hp) at 5000 rpm | 132 Nm. (97 lb•ft) at 3800 rpm | 5-speed manual (MQ200), FWD | 175 km/h (109 mph) | 12.2 | 5.9 / 47.9 / 39.9 | 139 |
| 1.4 MPI 63 kW (China) | 2008– | (EA111) | 1390 ccm, I4, 16V, DOHC, MPI, naturally aspirated | 63 kW (86 PS; 85 hp) at 5000 rpm | 132 Nm. (97 lb•ft) at 3750 rpm | 5-speed manual, FWD | 175 km/h (109 mph) | 12.5 | 6.4 / 44.1 / 36.7 | N/A |
| 1.4 MPI 63 kW (China) | 2008– | (EA390) | 1390 ccm, I4, 16V, DOHC, MPI, naturally aspirated | 63 kW (86 PS; 85 hp) at 5000 rpm | 132 Nm. (97 lb•ft) at 3750 rpm | 6-speed automatic, FWD | 167 km/h (104 mph) | 15.0 | 6.8 / 41.5 / 34.6 | N/A |
| 1.4 TSI 132 kW (RS) | 2010–2014 | CAVE (EA111) | 1390 ccm, I4, 16V, DOHC, TSI, twincharged | 132 kW (180 PS;176 hp ) at 6200 rpm | 250 Nm. (184 lb•ft) at 2000–4500 rpm | 7-speed automatic (DQ200), FWD | 224 km/h (139 mph) | 7.3 | 6.2 / 45.6 / 37.9 | 148 |
| 1.6 MPI 77 kW | 2007–2014 | (EA111) | 1598 ccm, I4, 16V, DOHC, MPI, naturally aspirated | 77 kW (105 PS; 103 hp) at 5600 rpm | 153 Nm. (113 lb•ft) at 3800 rpm | 5-speed manual (MQ200), FWD | 190 km/h (118 mph) | 10.4 | 6.9 / 40.9 / 34.1 | 217 |
| 1.6 MPI 77 kW | 2007–2014 | (EA111) | 1598 ccm, I4, 16V, DOHC, MPI, naturally aspirated | 77 kW (105 PS; 103 hp) at 5600 rpm | 153 Nm. (113 lb•ft) at 3800 rpm | 6-speed automatic (AQ250) FWD | 185 km/h (115 mph) | 11.5 | 7.5 / 37.7 / 31.4 | 180 |
| 1.6 MPI 77 kW (China) | 2008– | (EA111) | 1598 ccm, I4, 16V, DOHC, MPI, naturally aspirated | 77 kW (105 PS; 103 hp) at 5250 rpm | 155 Nm. (115 lb•ft) at 3750 rpm | 5-speed manual, FWD | 183 km/h (114 mph) | 11.0 | 6.4 / 44.1 / 36.7 | N/A |
| 1.6 MPI 77 kW (China) | 2008– | (EA111) | 1598 ccm, I4, 16V, DOHC, MPI, naturally aspirated | 77 kW (105 PS; 103 hp) at 5250 rpm | 155 Nm. (115 lb•ft) at 3750 rpm | 6-speed automatic, FWD | 180 km/h (112 mph) | 12.4 | 7.2 / 39.2 / 32.7 | N/A |

Diesel engines

| Engine designation | Production | Engine code (family) | Displacement, configuration, valvetrain, fuel system, aspiration | Motive power at rpm | max. torque at rpm | Gearbox (type), drive | Top speed | 0–100 km/h [s] (0–62 mph) | Combined consumption [l/100 km / mpg imp / mpg US] | CO2 [g/km] |
|---|---|---|---|---|---|---|---|---|---|---|
| 1.2 TDI CR 55 kW | 2010–2014 | (EA189) | 1199 ccm, I3, 12V, DOHC, common-rail, turbocharged | 55 kW (75 PS; 74 hp) at 4200 rpm | 180 Nm. (133 lb•ft) at 2000 rpm | 5-speed manual (MQ250), FWD | 166 km/h (103 mph) | 14.2 | 3.8 / 74.3 / 61.9 | 99 |
| 1.2 TDI CR GreenLine 55 kW | 2010–2014 | (EA189) | 1199 ccm, I3, 12V, DOHC, common-rail, turbocharged | 55 kW (75 PS; 74 hp) at 4200 rpm | 180 Nm. (133 lb•ft) at 2000 rpm | 5-speed manual (MQ250), FWD | 172 km/h (107 mph) | 14.2 | 3.4 / 83.1 / 69.2 | 88 |
| 1.4 TDI PD 51 kW | 2007–2010 | BNM (EA188) | 1422 ccm, I3, 6V, SOHC, Pumpe-Düse, turbocharged | 51 kW (70 PS; 68 hp) at 4000 rpm | 155 Nm. (114 lb•ft) at 1600–2800 rpm | 5-speed manual (MQ250), FWD | 163 km/h (101 mph) | 14.8 | 4.8 / 58.9 / 49.0 | 127 |
| 1.4 TDI PD 59 kW | 2007–2010 | BNV (EA188) | 1422 ccm, I3, 6V, SOHC, Pumpe-Düse, turbocharged | 59 kW (80 PS; 79 hp) at 4000 rpm | 195 Nm. (144 lb•ft) at 2200 rpm | 5-speed manual (MQ250), FWD | 172 km/h (107 mph) | 13.2 | 4.6 / 61.4 / 51.1 | 120 |
| 1.4 TDI DPF GreenLine 59 kW | 2008–2010 | BNV (EA188) | 1442 ccm, I3, 6V, SOHC, Pumpe-Düse, turbocharged | 59 kW (80 PS; 79 hp) at 4000 rpm | 195 Nm. (144 lb•ft) at 2200 rpm | 5-speed manual (MQ250), FWD | 170 km/h (106 mph) | 13.2 | 4.1 / 68.9 / 57.4 | 109 |
| 1.6 TDI CR DPF 55 kW | 2010–2014 | CAYA (EA189) | 1598 ccm, I4, 16V, DOHC, common-rail, turbocharged | 55 kW (75 PS; 74 hp) at 4000 rpm | 195 Nm. (144 lb•ft) at 1500–2000 rpm | 5-speed manual (MQ250), FWD | 166 km/h (103 mph) | 14.1 | 4.2 / 67.3 / 56.0 | 109 |
| 1.6 TDI CR DPF 66 kW | 2010–2014 | CAYB (EA189) | 1598 ccm, I4, 16V, DOHC, common-rail, turbocharged | 66 kW (90 PS; 89 hp) at 4200 rpm | 230 Nm. (170 lb•ft) at 1500–2500 rpm | 5-speed manual (MQ250), FWD | 176 km/h (109 mph) | 12.6 | 4.2 / 67.3 / 56.0 | 109 |
| 1.6 TDI CR DPF 77 kW | 2010–2014 | CAYC (EA189) | 1598 ccm, I4, 16V, DOHC, common-rail, turbocharged | 77 kW (105 PS; 103 hp) at 4400 rpm | 250 Nm. (184 lb•ft) at 1500–2500 rpm | 5-speed manual (MQ250), FWD | 188 km/h (117 mph) | 10.9 | 4.2 / 67.3 / 56.0 | 109 |
| 1.9 TDI PD 77 kW | 2007–2010 | BSW (EA188) | 1896 ccm, I4, 8V SOHC, Pumpe-Düse, turbocharged | 77 kW (105 PS; 103 hp) at 4000 rpm | 240 Nm. (177 lb•ft) at 1900 rpm | 5-speed manual (MQ250), FWD | 190 km/h (118 mph) | 10.8 | 5.0 / 56.5 / 47.0 | 130 |

=== Related models ===
The Škoda Roomster is a multi-purpose vehicle, also available as a panel van, that is based on the same platform and that also features the same front end design.

In 2011, the Škoda Rapid was launched in India, a four-door sedan car featuring the same front end design as the second generation Fabia, but based instead on the newer PQ25 platform. It is related with the 2010 Volkswagen Vento, also developed in India, which is essentially a three-box version of the Volkswagen Polo Mk5. It is produced by Škoda India exclusively for the Indian market. It also has a slightly different interior.

=== Motorsport ===
The Motorsport division of Škoda AUTO builds Škoda Fabia Super 2000 rally car. Since its debut in 2009, the Fabia Super 2000 won 14 international titles and 22 national championships. Lars Larsson won the FIA European Rallycross Championship in 2007. Sergey Zagumennov did the same in 2014.

== Third generation (Type NJ; 2014) ==
Škoda Fabia Mk3 (NJ)
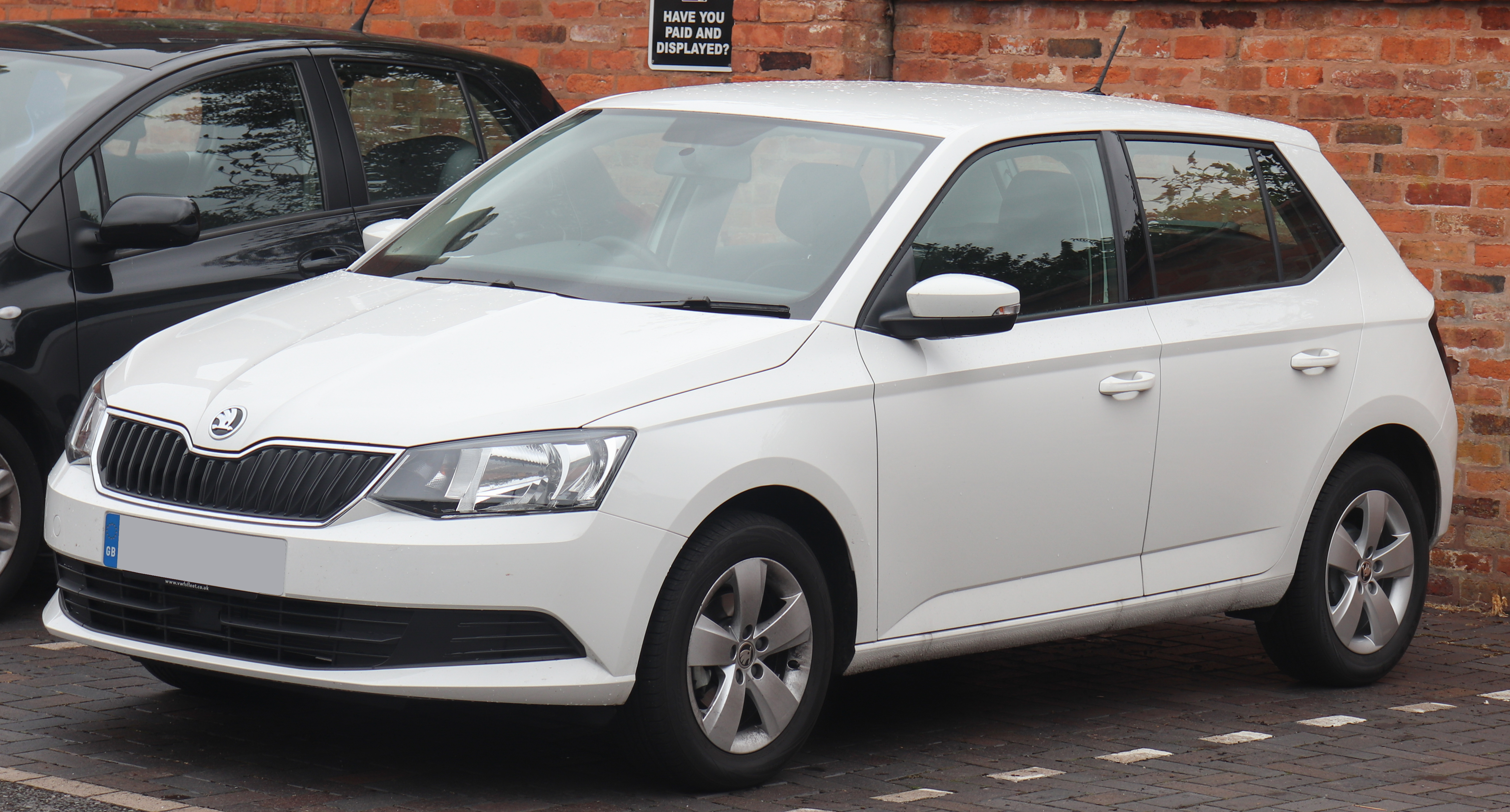

Overview
- Model code: Typ NJ
- Also called: Škoda Fabia Combi Tour (2022)
- Production: August 2014 – November 2022
- Assembly: Czech Republic: Mladá Boleslav; China: Anting; Algeria: Relizane (SKD; SOVAC-VW); Ukraine: Solomonovo (SKD; Eurocar)

Body and chassis
- Body style: 5-door hatchback 5-door estate
- Layout: Front-engine, front-wheel-drive
- Platform: Volkswagen Group A06 (PQ26) platform
- Related: Audi A1 Mk1; SEAT Ibiza Mk4; Volkswagen Polo Mk5

Powertrain
- Engine: Petrol: 1.0 L MPI I3; 1.0 L TSI I3; 1.2 L TSI I4; Diesel: 1.4 L TDI I3
- Transmission: 5-speed manual 6-speed manual 7-speed automatic

Dimensions
- Wheelbase: 2,470 mm (97.2 in)
- Length: 3,992 mm (157.2 in) (hatchback); 4,257 mm (167.6 in) (estate)
- Width: 1,730 mm (68.1 in) (hatchback); 1,732 mm (68.2 in) (estate)
- Height: 1,467 mm (57.8 in) (hatchback); 1,488 mm (58.6 in) (estate)
- Curb weight: 1,055–1,165 kg (2,326–2,568 lb) (hatchback)

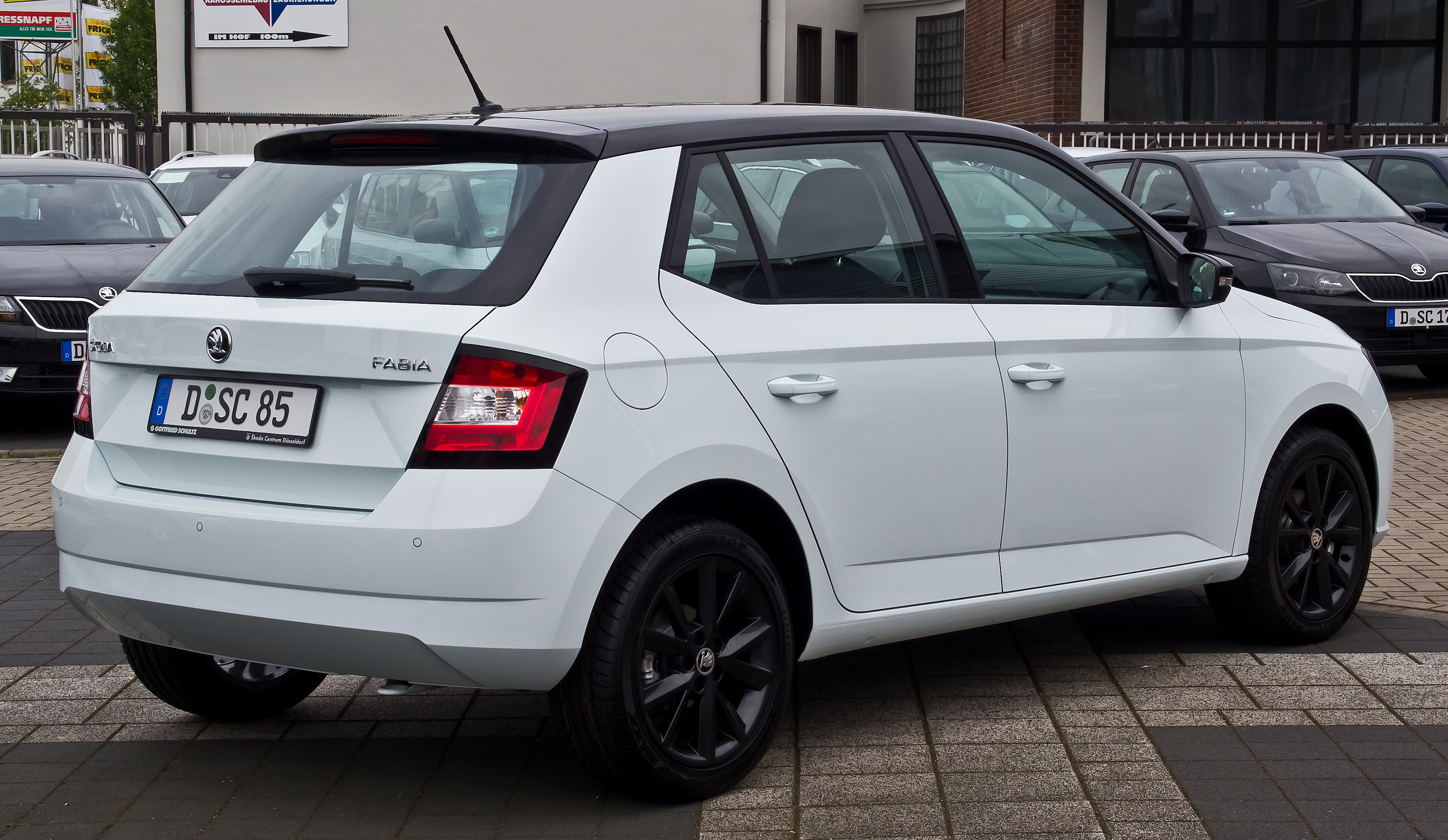
Hatchback (pre-facelift)

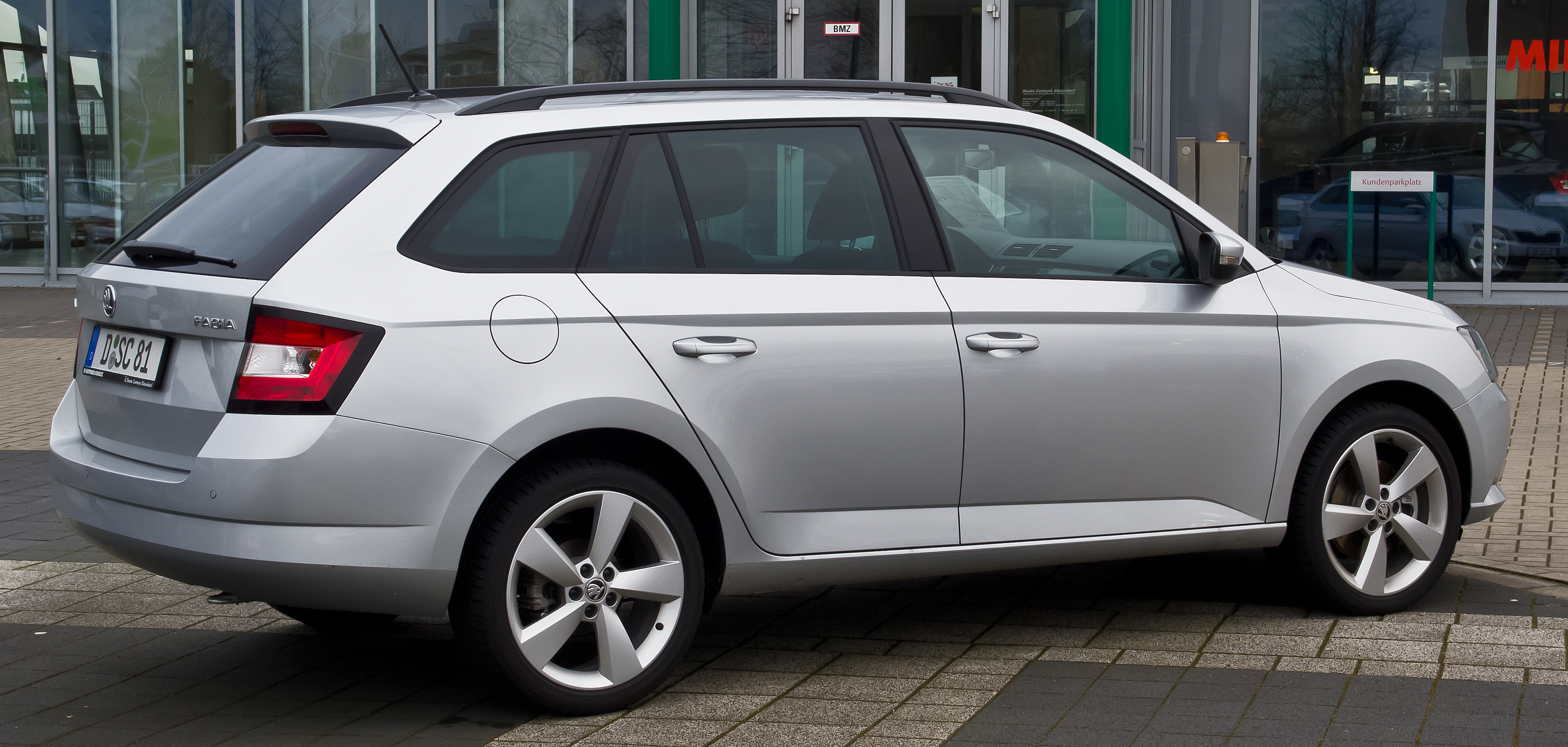
Combi

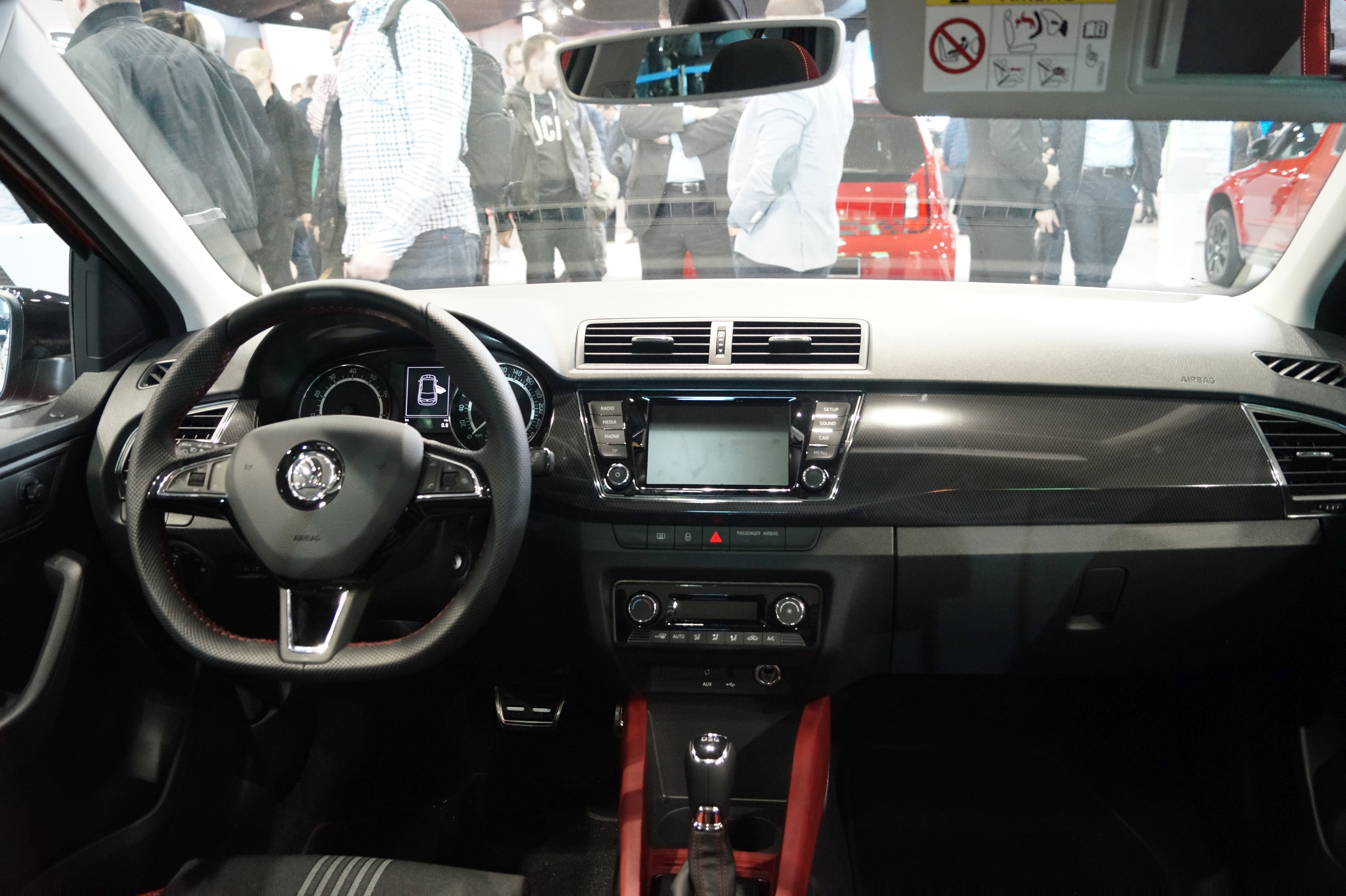
Interior

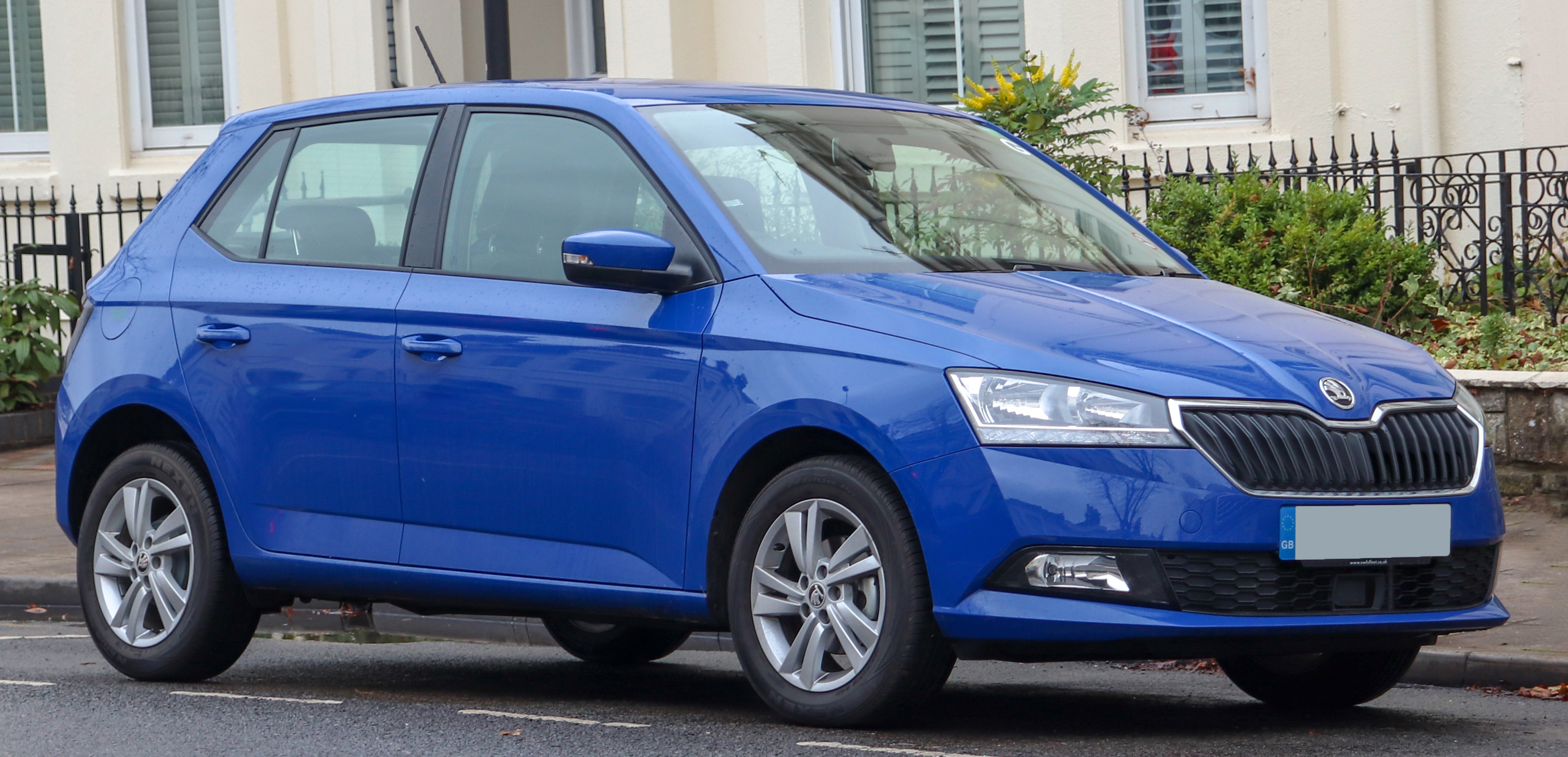

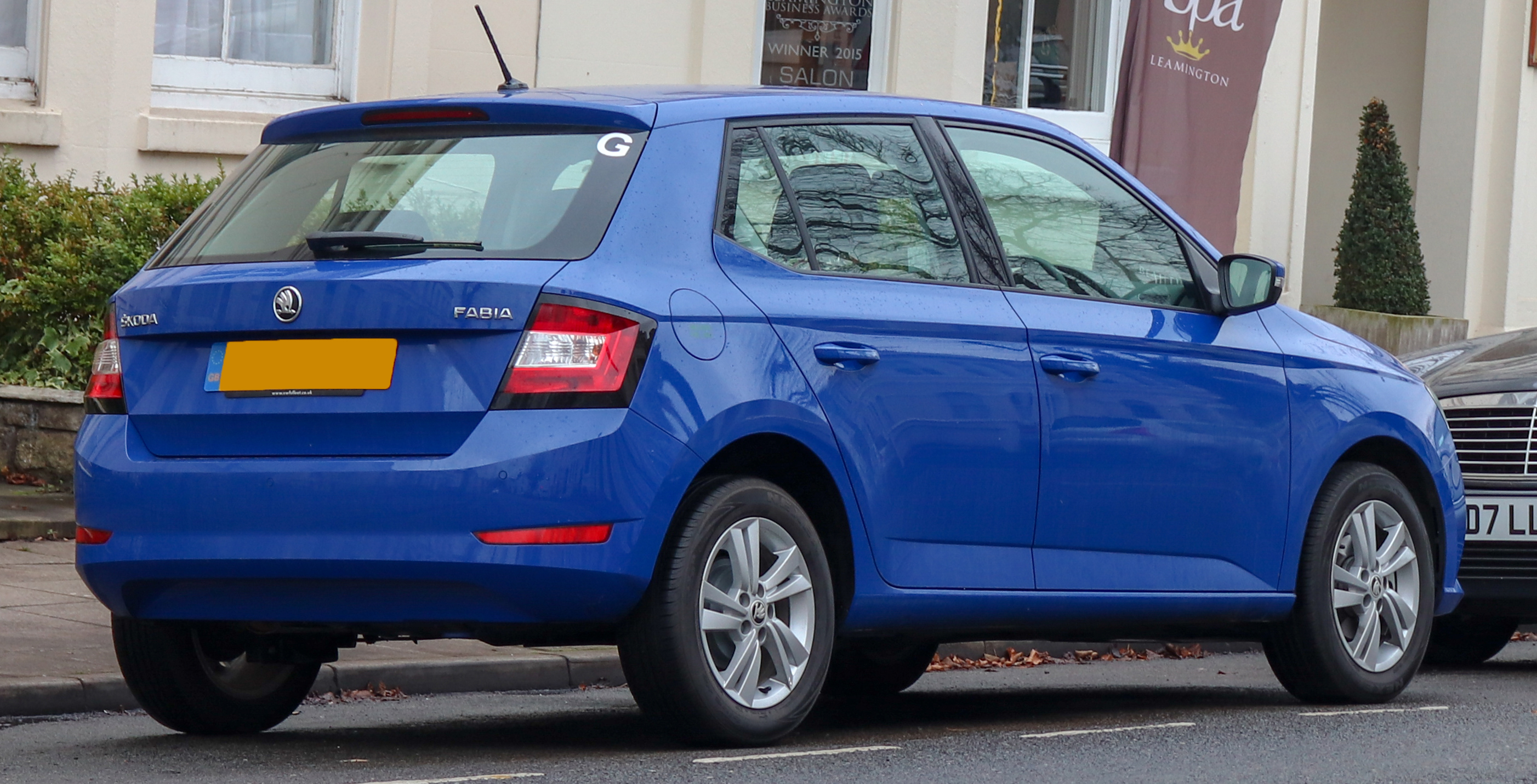
Hatchback (facelift)

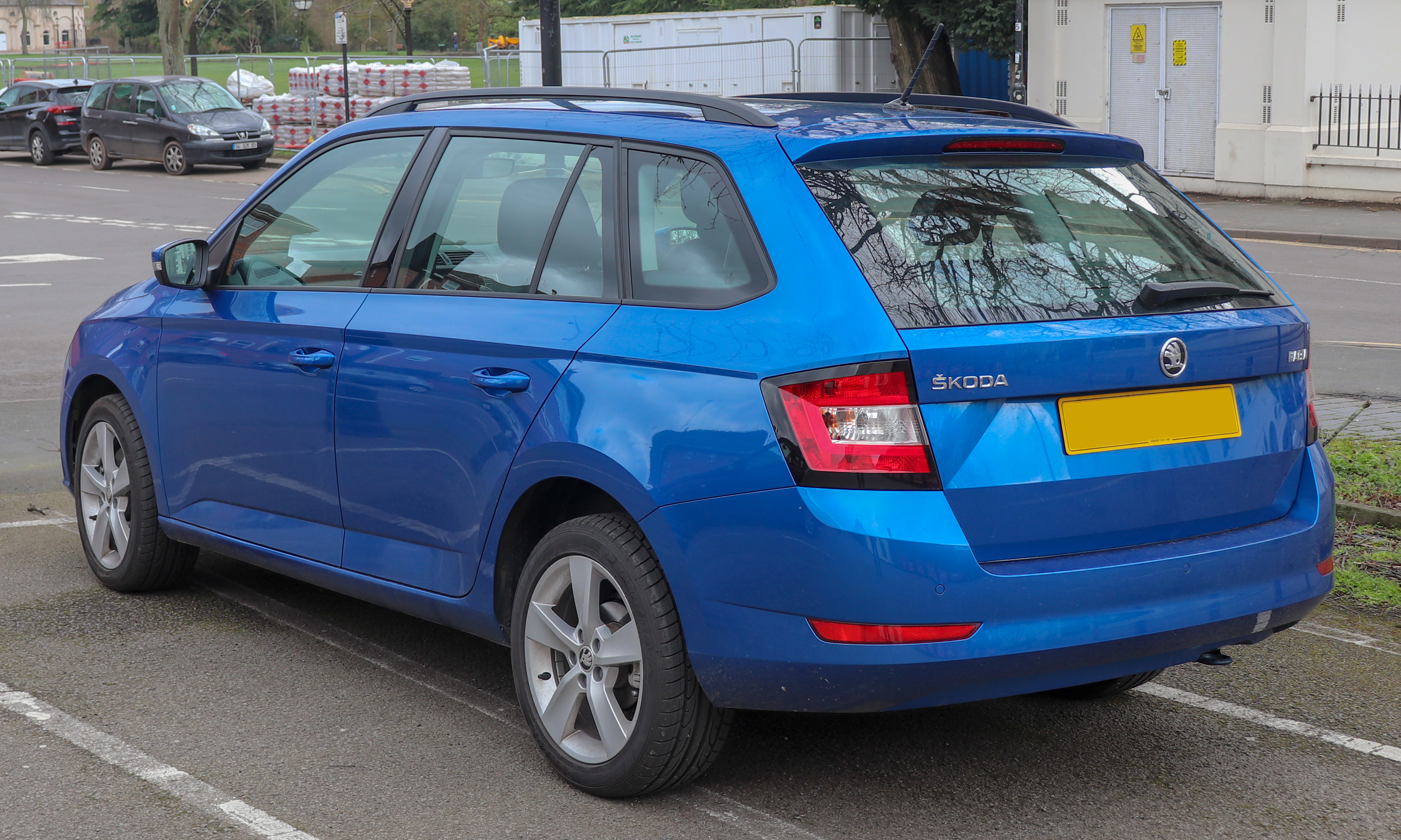
Combi (facelift)

The third generation Fabia was introduced at the Paris Motor Show in October 2014, with sales starting in the following month. Production was launched prior to the end of August 2014 in Mladá Boleslav, with manufacturing of the estate version first occurring in December 2014. Due to the low sales of RS models from the previous model generation, a hot hatch variant is not planned for production.

The Mk3 Fabia - like the facelifted Mk5 Volkswagen Polo starting 2014 - underwent a major technical revision, being based on the PQ26 platform: a mixture of the PQ25 platform (Volkswagen Polo MK5 pre-facelift, 2009–2014) and the MQB platform, which is currently used by seven Volkswagen Group models. The chassis has been modified to "revert to the Fabia’s original, first-generation design" by becoming 90 mm wider and 30 mm lower, resulting in more interior and boot space. Despite being 8 mm shorter, the Mk3 Fabia still offers more passenger room due to its extended wheelbase. Simultaneously, its weight has been reduced by 65 kg (143 lb). A similar approach was applied to the styling, according to Škoda designer Marko Jevtic: "It [the Mk3 model] has the qualities of the first Fabia, [...] We wanted its simplicity; we did not want to overload the design."

The Mk3 Fabia won the "Overall winner" and "Best small car" categories of the 2015 What Car? Car of the Year awards.

=== Safety ===
The 3rd generation Fabia now comes equipped with the Front assist safety system. It gathers data from a radar sensor to automatically warn the driver and apply the brakes at the possibility of a collision at certain speeds.

Euro NCAP test results* Škoda Fabia (2014)
| Test | Points | % |
|---|---|---|
| Overall: | 5 /5 stars | |
| Adult occupant: | 31 | 81% |
| Child occupant: | 40 | 81% |
| Pedestrian: | 25 | 69% |
| Safety assist: | 9 | 69% |

ANCAP test results* Skoda Fabia 5 door hatch & wagon variants (2015)
| Test | Score |
|---|---|
| Overall | 5 /5 stars |
| Frontal offset | 13.68/16 |
| Side impact | 15.49/16 |
| Pole | 2/2 |
| Seat belt reminders | 3/3 |
| Whiplash protection | Good |
| Pedestrian protection | Adequate |
| Electronic stability control | Standard |

=== Engines ===
The powertrain selection for the Mk3 Fabia was borrowed from the current Mk5 Polo, although the missing 1.2-litre TDI engine was slated to be included in the fuel economy-oriented Greenline model that was due for release in late 2015. Instead, the Greenline name was dropped, in favour of using the TDI nameplate, and a newer inline-three 1.4-litre engine was put to use in the Diesel model instead, with two different levels of power output available. The 1.2-litre inline-three petrol engines from the Mk2 model were replaced by smaller but more efficient 1.0-litre engines, introduced from June 2017.

Petrol engines
| Engine designation | Production | Engine code (family) | Displacement, configuration, valvetrain, fuel system, aspiration | Motive power at rpm | max. torque at rpm | Gearbox (type), drive | Top speed | 0–100 km/h [s] (0–62 mph) | Combined consumption [l/100 km / mpg imp / mpg US] | CO2 [g/km] |
|---|---|---|---|---|---|---|---|---|---|---|
| 1.0 MPI | 10/2014– | CHYA | 999 cc (61.0 cu in) I3, 12V DOHC belt driven, manifold injection, natural aspiration | 60 PS (44 kW; 59 hp)@5000–6000 | 95 N⋅m (70 lb⋅ft)@3000–4300 | 5-speed manual, FWD | 160 km/h (99 mph) | 15.7 s | 4.7 L / 60 / 50 | 106 g/km |
| 1.0 MPI | 10/2014–2019 | CHYB | 999 cc (61.0 cu in) I3, 12V DOHC belt driven, manifold injection, natural aspiration | 75 PS (55 kW; 74 hp)@6200 | 95 N⋅m (70 lb⋅ft)@3000–4300 | 5-speed manual, FWD | 172 km/h (107 mph) | 14.7 s | 4.8 L / 58.85 / 49 | 108 g/km |
| 1.2 TSI | 10/2014–6/2017 | CJZC (EA211) | 1,197 cc (73.0 cu in), I4, 16V DOHC belt driven, direct injection, turbocharged | 90 PS (66 kW; 89 hp)@4400–5400 | 160 N⋅m (118 lb⋅ft)@1400–3500 | 5-speed manual, FWD | 182 km/h (113 mph) | 10.9 s | 4.7 L / 60 / 50 | 107 g/km |
| 1.2 TSI | 10/2014–6/2017 | CJZD (EA211) | 1,197 cc (73.0 cu in), I4, 16V DOHC belt driven, direct injection, turbocharged | 110 PS (81 kW; 108 hp)@4600–5600 | 175 N⋅m (129 lb⋅ft)@1400–4000 | 6-speed manual, FWD | 196 km/h (122 mph) | 9.4 s | 4.8 L / 58.85 / 49 | 110 g/km |
| 1.2 TSI | 10/2014–6/2017 | CJZD (EA211) | 1,197 cc (73.0 cu in), I4, 16V DOHC belt driven, direct injection, turbocharged | 110 PS (81 kW; 108 hp)@4600–5600 | 175 N⋅m (129 lb⋅ft)@1400–4000 | 7-speed automatic DSG, FWD | 196 km/h (122 mph) | 9.4 s | 4.7 L / 60 / 50 | 109 g/km |
| 1.0 TSI | 6/2017- | CHZB (EA211) | 999 cc (61.0 cu in), I3, 12V DOHC belt driven, direct injection, turbocharged | 95 PS (70 kW; 94 hp)@5000–5500 | 160 N⋅m (118 lb⋅ft)@1500–3500 | 5-speed manual, FWD | 183 km/h (114 mph) (Hatchback), 187 km/h (116 mph) (combi) | 10.6 s (Hatchback), 10.8 s (combi) | 4.3 L / 65.7 / 54.7 | 99 g/km |
| 1.0 TSI | 6/2017- | CHZC (EA211) | 999 cc (61.0 cu in), I3, 12V DOHC belt driven, direct injection, turbocharged | 110 PS (81 kW; 108 hp)@5000–5500 | 200 N⋅m (148 lb⋅ft)@2000–3500 | 6-speed manual, FWD | 196 km/h (122 mph) (Hatchback), 199 km/h (124 mph) (combi) | 9.5 s (Hatchback), 9.6 s (combi) | 4.4 L / 64.2 / 53.5 | 103 g/km |
| 1.0 TSI | 6/2017- | CHZC (EA211) | 999 cc (61.0 cu in), I3, 12V DOHC belt driven, direct injection, turbocharged | 110 PS (81 kW; 108 hp)@5000–5500 | 200 N⋅m (148 lb⋅ft)@2000–3500 | 7-speed automatic DSG, FWD | 196 km/h (122 mph) (Hatchback), 199 km/h (124 mph) (combi) | 9.8 s | 4.5 L / 62.8 / 52.3 | 106 g/km |

Diesel engines
| Engine designation | Production | Engine code (family) | Displacement, configuration, valvetrain, fuel system, aspiration | Motive power at rpm | max. torque at rpm | Gearbox (type), drive | Top speed | 0–100 km/h [s] (0–62 mph) | Combined consumption [l/100 km / mpg imp / mpg US] | CO2 [g/km] |
|---|---|---|---|---|---|---|---|---|---|---|
| 1.4 TDI | 10/2014–06/2017 | CUSB | 1,422 cc (86.8 cu in), I3, 12V DOHC belt driven, common rail, turbocharged | 90 PS (66 kW; 89 hp)@3000–3250 | 230 N⋅m (170 lb⋅ft)@1750–2500 | 5-speed manual, FWD | 182 km/h (113 mph) | 11.1 s | 3.4 L / 83.1 / 69.2 | 88 g/km |
| 1.4 TDI | 10/2014–06/2017 | CUSB | 1,422 cc (86.8 cu in), I3, 12V DOHC belt driven, common rail, turbocharged | 90 PS (66 kW; 89 hp)@3000–3250 | 230 N⋅m (170 lb⋅ft)@1750–2500 | 7-speed automatic DSG, FWD | 182 km/h (113 mph) | 11.1 s | 3.6 L / 78.5 / 65.3 | 94 g/km |
| 1.4 TDI | 10/2014–06/2017 | CUTA | 1,422 cc (86.8 cu in), I3, 12V DOHC belt driven, common rail, turbocharged | 105 PS (77 kW; 104 hp)@3500–3750 | 250 N⋅m (184 lb⋅ft)@1750–2500 | 5-speed manual, FWD | 193 km/h (120 mph) | 10.1 s | 3.5 L / 80.71 / 67.2 | 90 g/km |

=== Facelift ===
The Mk3 Fabia and Fabia Combi were facelifted for the 2019 model year. The trim levels for the Fabia have been reorganised, with the S model continuing as the entry level trim level, with the Monte Carlo now being the range topping model, with the SE, the Colour Edition, and the SE L bridging the gap in between respectively. Revisions included a redesigned front-end, with a new wider grille and redesigned headlights, with the option of Full LED headlights now available. The rear of the car was also given a slight update with new bumper-mounted reflectors, and the option for Full LED rear lights, which are now included as standard on the range-topping Monte Carlo trim level. On the Interior of the car, the trim inserts and central transmission tunnel housing can now be customised with coloured trim. Also included on the interior of the vehicle, the Swing radio system on lower trim levels now includes a larger 6.5 inch display offered on the S model, with the SE model having the Swing Plus system included, with the 7 inch Amundsen system being offered on the SE and above. The Fabia also gained new features such as blind spot monitoring, optional 18" alloy wheels, pulse function for all electric windows, and more. Interior updates included new dashboard decor options, seat upholstery variations, and an optional black headliner. Both TSI engines were also equipped with a particulate filter to meet the new WLTP emissions standards. In February, the 1.4 TDI engine was discontinued.

In 2019, the 1.0 MPI 55 kW engine was removed from the lineup, leaving only the less powerful 44 kW version. Additionally, the 1.0 TSI 81 kW with DSG transmission was discontinued. A new "Black Package" was introduced, featuring black grille, mirrors, and alloy wheels. In 2020, DAB radio became standard, and the Škoda logo on the tailgate was replaced by lettering.

In June 2021, production of the hatchback version ended, while the Combi remained available as the "Tour" edition, offered with the 1.0 TSI 70 kW engine paired with either a manual gearbox or DSG. Production of the third-generation Fabia ended in November 2022.

In terms of engines, the Diesel engines have been removed from the line-up, which means the model range consists of petrol engines only. The 1.0 MPI is offered on the lower spec S and SE models, with the more powerful 1.0 TSI being offered on the SE model and above.

As of 2020, Skoda manufactured 1 million 3rd-gen Fabia.

=== Motorsport ===
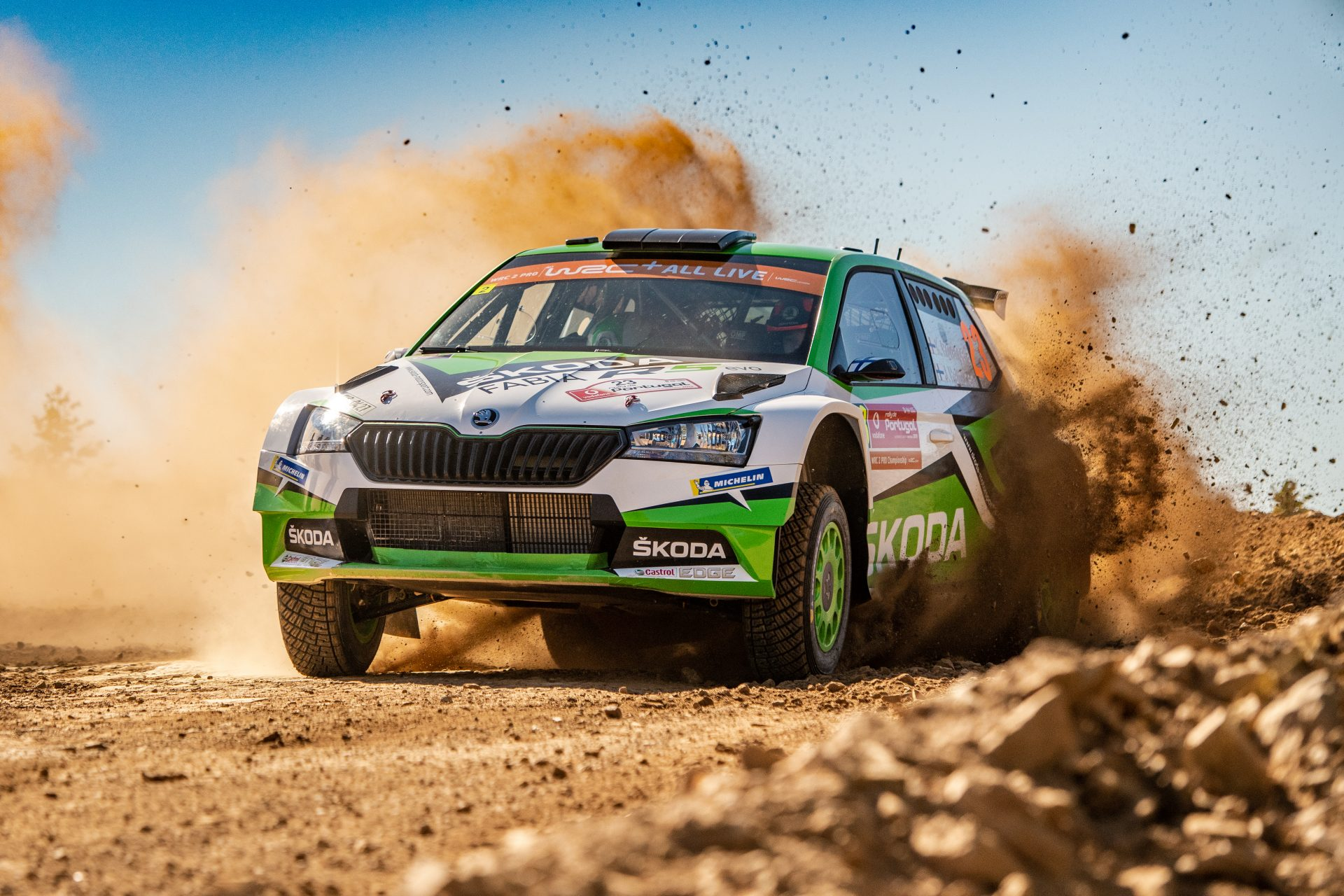
The Škoda Fabia R5 is one of the most successful cars in the category.

The Škoda Fabia R5 is a Group R rally version of the car and it has been competing in the European Rally Championship since the 2015 edition, as well as in the World Rally Championship-2, also since the 2015 edition.

=== Concept cars ===
The Funstar (stylised as FUNStar) is a pick-up concept car based on the Mk3 Fabia. It was designed by Škoda Auto University students as a throwback to the Felicia Fun, a compact pick-up car produced during the 1990s. It was shown at the annual 2015 Wörthersee GTI fan meeting.

The exterior received a unique paint make-up, complemented with green day-running lights, 18-inch wheels from the Octavia RS and bonnet vents. The pick-up bed required the removal of the C-pillars, necessitating wider B-pillars and stiffened side panels to retain structural strength. The Funstar is powered by a 1.2-litre TSI petrol engine, paired with a 7-speed dual-clutch transmission. A 1.8-litre engine was originally planned for use but could not be implemented due to its size.

== Fourth generation (Type PJ; 2021) ==
Škoda Fabia Mk4
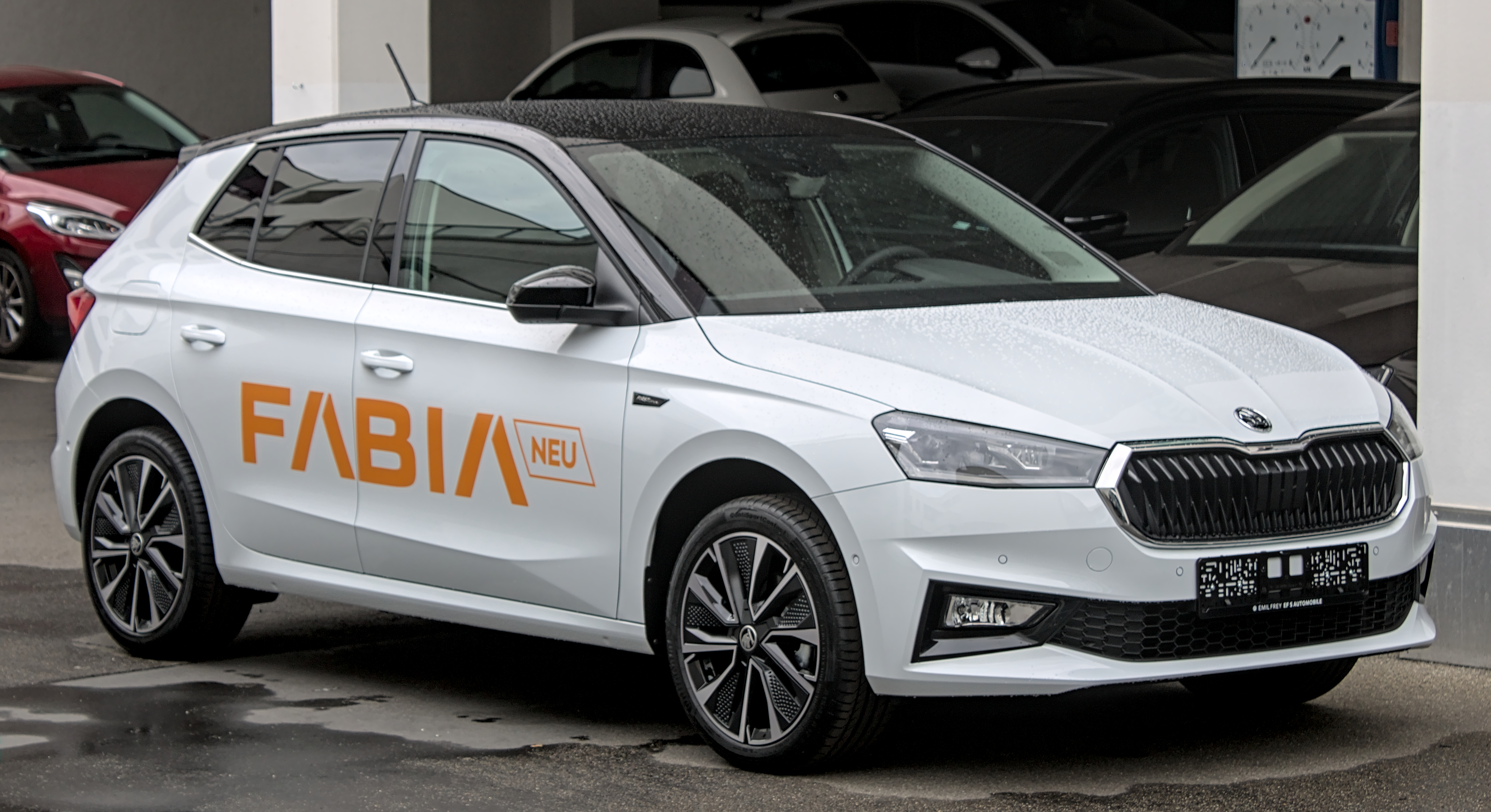

Overview
- Model code: Typ PJ
- Production: July 2021–present
- Assembly: Czech Republic: Mladá Boleslav
- Designer: Karl Neuhold under Oliver Stefani

Body and chassis
- Body style: 5-door hatchback
- Platform: Volkswagen Group MQB A0
- Related: Škoda Scala; Škoda Kushaq; Škoda Kamiq; Škoda Slavia; Volkswagen T-Cross; Volkswagen Polo Mk6; Volkswagen Virtus; SEAT Ibiza Mk5; SEAT Arona; Audi A1 Mk2

Powertrain
- Engine: Petrol: 1.0 L EA211 MPI EVO 65 / 80 I3; 1.0 L EA211 TSI EVO 90 / 110 I3; 1.5 L EA211 Evo TSI 150 (DADA) I4
- Transmission: 5-speed manual 6-speed manual 7-speed DSG

Dimensions
- Wheelbase: 2,564 mm (100.9 in)
- Length: 4,107 mm (161.7 in)
- Width: 1,780 mm (70.1 in)
- Height: 1,460 mm (57.5 in)

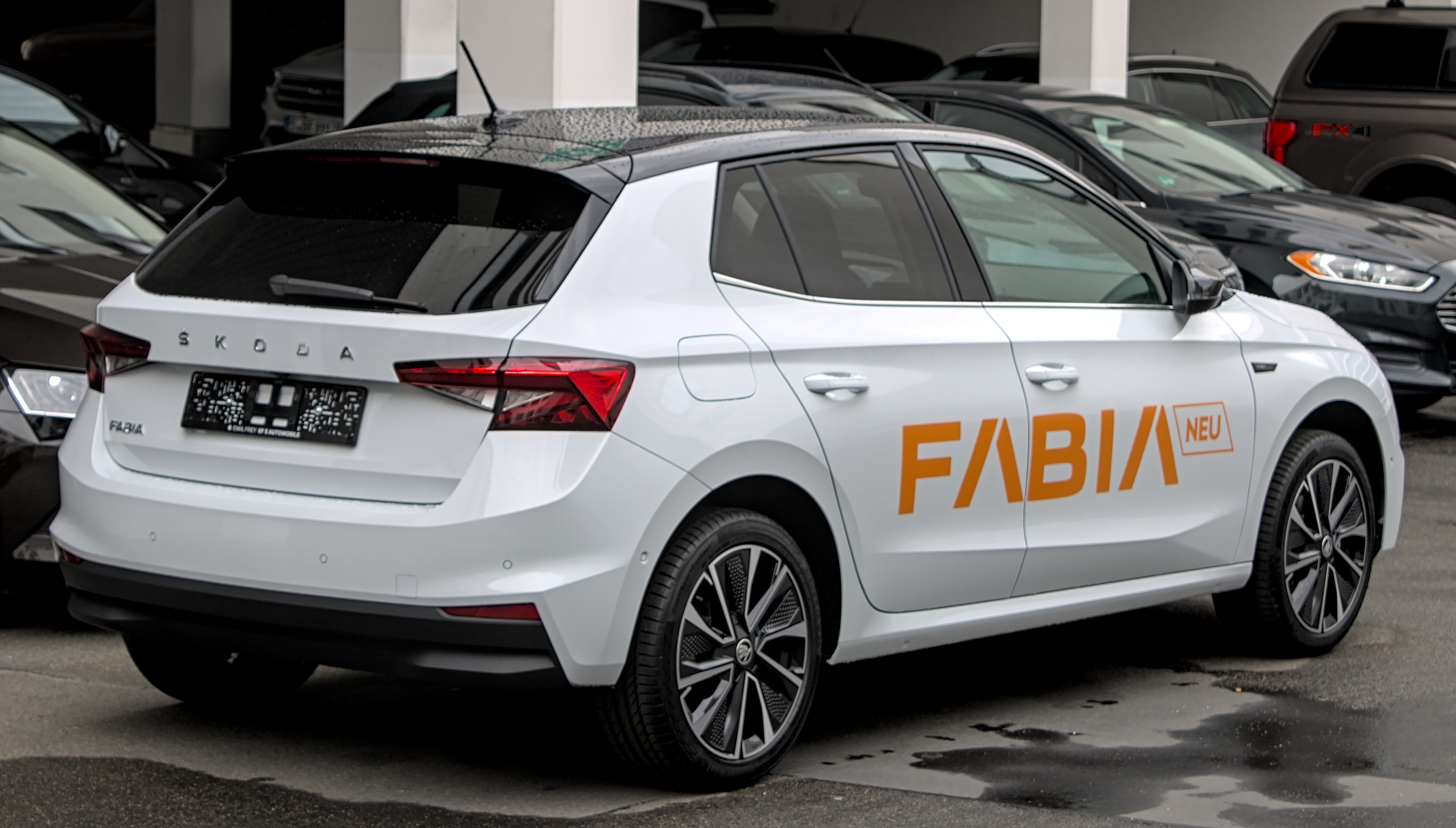
Rear view

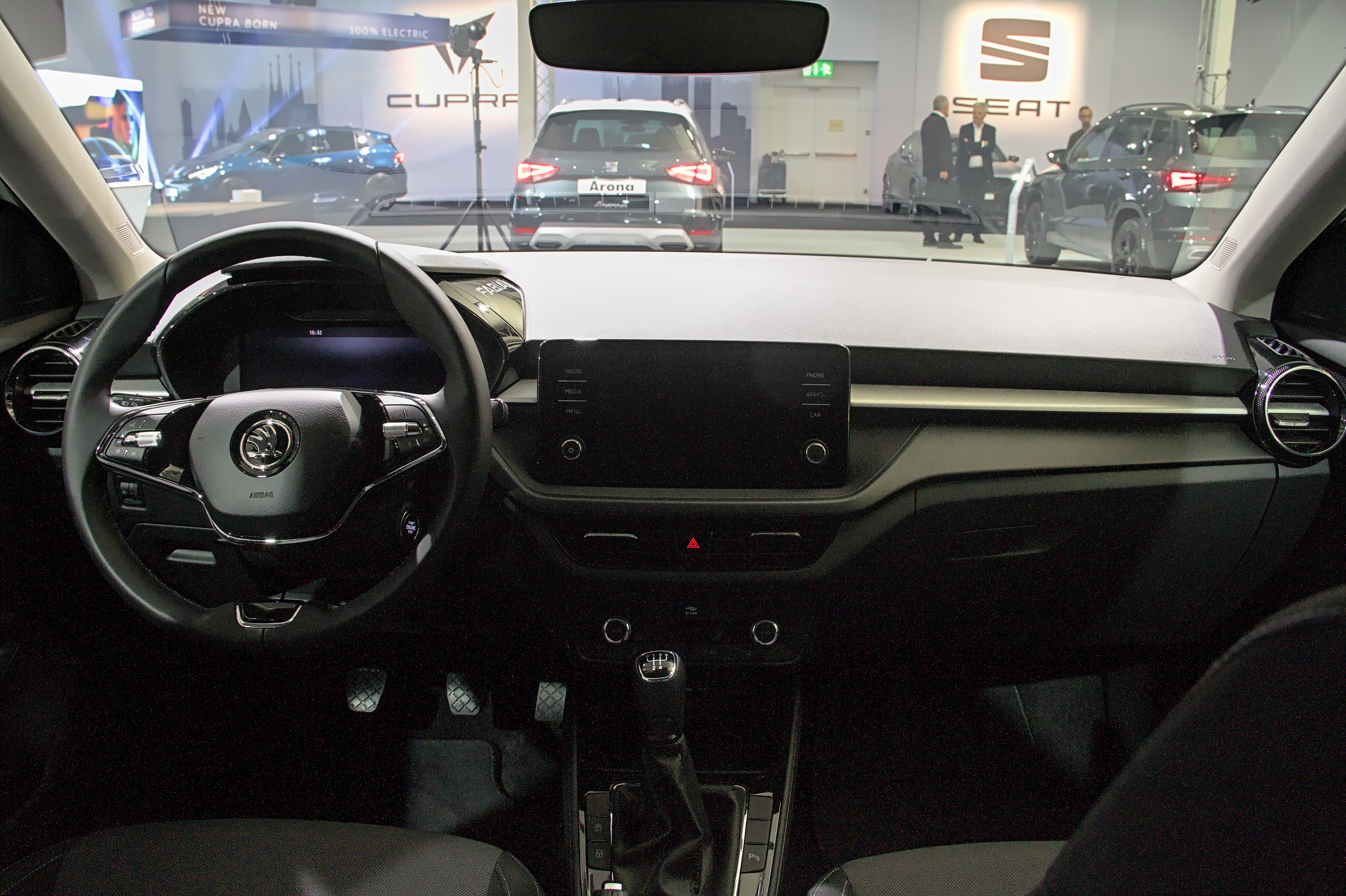
Interior

The fourth generation Škoda Fabia went on sale towards the end of 2021. The new Fabia sports an updated design more consistent of other models in the Škoda range. The fourth generation will also be based upon the MQB-A0 platform, Volkswagen Group's shared vehicle platform currently used to produce the Škoda Scala and Kamiq. The dimensions of the new hatchback have changed when compared to its predecessor. With a wheelbase which is 94 mm (3.7 in) longer compared to the Mk 3, an increase in length of 115 mm (4.5 in), an increase in width of 50 mm (2.0 in) but a decrease in height of 7 mm (0.3 in), extended interior room will be available.

The car has received aerodynamic adjustments which have achieved a reduction in drag coefficient from 0.32 to 0.28, which Škoda claim makes it "the best in the small car segment".

Detailed information about the model's engine range has been revealed. All engines will be from the Volkswagen Group's Evo engine range, with power outputs ranging from 65PS up to 150PS.

In August 2021, Škoda cancelled its project to renew the Fabia Combi for the fourth generation due to Euro 7 standards. By the end of 2022, Fabia entered the Egyptian market.

In October 2025, Škoda introduced the Fabia 130; a warm hatch named for its 130 kW (174 hp; 177 PS) power output and as a celebration of the company's 130th anniversary. With an official 0-62 mph (100 km/h) time of 7.4s and top speed of 141 mph (227 km/h), it is advertised as the quickest Fabia to date and features distinguishing interior and cosmetic features such as sports seats, 130 badging, black accents and dual-tip exhausts, in addition to 18" wheels and suspension 15mm lower than other variants'.

=== Safety ===
Euro NCAP test results Škoda Fabia 1.0 TSI 'Ambition' (LHD) (2021)
| Test | Points | % |
|---|---|---|
| Overall: | 5 /5 stars | |
| Adult occupant: | 32.4 | 85% |
| Child occupant: | 40.1 | 81% |
| Pedestrian: | 38.2 | 70% |
| Safety assist: | 11.4 | 71% |

ANCAP test results Skoda Fabia (2021, aligned with Euro NCAP)
| Test | Points | % |
|---|---|---|
| Overall: | 5 /5 stars | |
| Adult occupant: | 32.43 | 85% |
| Child occupant: | 39.71 | 81% |
| Pedestrian: | 38.23 | 70% |
| Safety assist: | 11.40 | 71% |

== Sales ==
| Year | Production |
|---|---|
| 1999 | 3,883 |
| 2000 | 175,780 |
| 2001 | 261,551 |
| 2002 | 253,805 |
| 2003 | 260,512 |
| 2004 | 238,830 |
| 2005 | 224,990 |
| 2006 | 240,051 |
| 2007 | 243,576 |
| 2008 | 244,981 |
| 2009 | 260,562 |
| 2010 | 234,593 |
| 2011 | 262,497 |
| 2012 | 255,025 |
| 2013 | 196,597 |
| 2014 | 162,954 |
| 2015 | 195,349 |
| 2016 | 203,308 |
| 2017 | 209,471 |
| 2018 | 186,213 |
| 2019 | 166,237 |
| 2020 | 100,425 |
| 2021 | 94,105 |
| 2022 | 118,827 |
| 2023 | 114,335 |
