= Popular music in Sweden =

Swedish popular music, or shortened as Swedish pop music, refers to music that has swept the Swedish mainstream at any given point in recent times. After World War II, Swedish pop music was heavily influenced by American jazz, and then by rock-and-roll from the U.S. and the U.K. in the 1950s and 1960s, before developing into dansband music. Since the 1970s, Swedish pop music has come to international prominence with bands singing in English, ranking high on the British, New Zealand, American, and Australian charts and making Sweden one of the world's top exporter of popular music by gross domestic product.

== History ==
=== Post-war ===
With the influx of American G.I.s into Europe in the 1940s, styles of American music seeded themselves into Swedish culture. Many Swedish dansorkestrar ("dance orchestras") played jitterbug, foxtrot, and swing music and other jazz-derived tunes for people to dance to. In the 1950s early rock and roll, as well as country music and German schlager also infused the market, influencing Swedish musicians to build upon these styles, gradually moving them away from jazz, which was turning more toward the avant garde.

=== 1960s ===
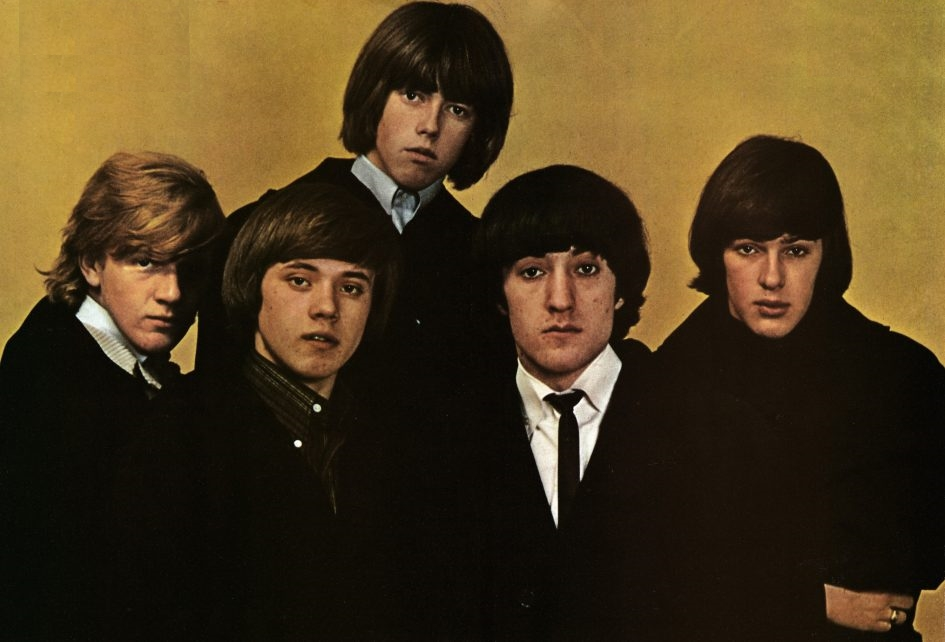
Tages (pictured here in 1965) are widely considered one of the best Swedish bands of the 1960s.

The jazz orchestra dancing in Scandinavia was interrupted by the counterculture of the 1960s, whose influences of left-wing politics and LSD were altering the shape of popular music around the world. In 1967 the first psychedelic and progressive rock groups emerged in Stockholm's Filips club, including Hansson & Karlsson, the Baby Grandmothers, and Mecki Mark Men. These groups were very popular in Sweden of the late 60s, with television appearances, sold-out concerts, and tours around Europe. Mecki Mark Men even spent three months in the U.S. where they played in big rock music festivals with Sly and the Family Stone, Jethro Tull, Pentangle, Mountain, Grand Funk Railroad, Paul Butterfield, and The Byrds. Aside from this music that blended rock, jazz, and folk music with improvisation and experimentation, Swedish progressive rock, or "progg" as it became known, was also fiercely political. Progg bands would go on to support efforts against war and nuclear power, or protest competitive events like Eurovision, stating, "Music cannot be a contest."

Due to the sheer popularity that the Beatles received in Sweden, they inspired countless other bands to form and write original compositions. Some of the most popular bands performing pop-music during this era were the Hep Stars, The Shanes, Ola & the Janglers and Tages. All of these bands, to some degree, wrote their own material, including Benny Andersson, who with the Hep Stars wrote the singles "No Response" (1965), "Sunny Girl", "Wedding" and "Consolation" (all 1966). Tages, despite their enormous success in Sweden, decided to try an international career. They recorded several albums in doing so, including one of the earliest psychedelic albums, Extra Extra. In 1967, the band incorporated traditional Swedish music into their performances. Their final album Studio is a prime example of this. Studio features solely original material and is considered one of the best Swedish albums of the 1960s.

=== 1970s: Dansbandmusik and ABBA ===
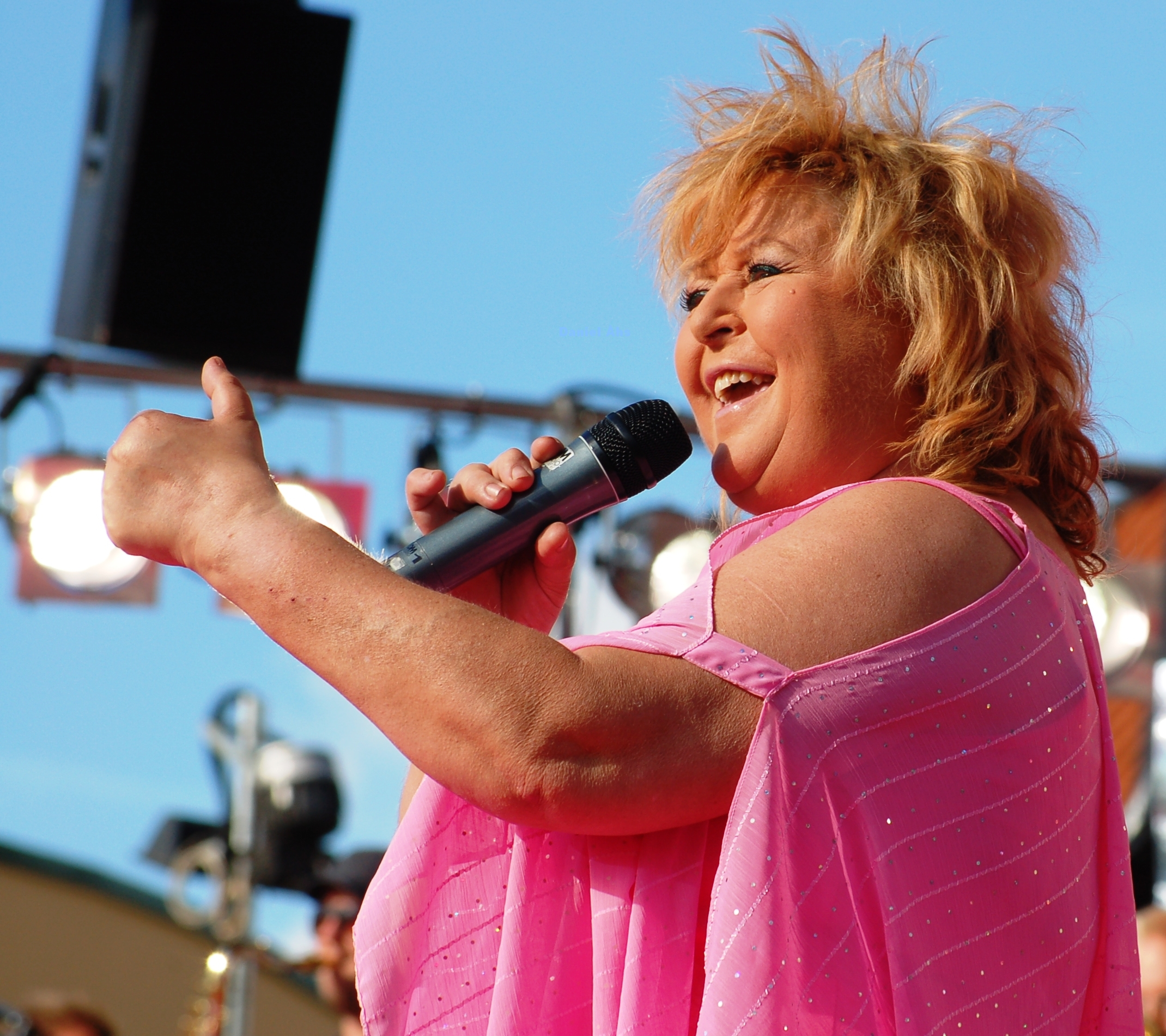
Kikki Danielsson broke through with Wizex in the 1970s.

The term "dansband" was coined around 1970, when Swedish popular music developed a signature style with brightly characterized lyrics and catchy melodies. The following decade became the golden era of dansband music, with groups like Thorleifs, Flamingokvintetten, Ingmar Nordströms, Wizex and Matz Bladhs rising to popularity in Sweden. In 1977, the song "Beatles", performed by Swedish dansband Forbes, won the Swedish Melodifestivalen 1977 and finished 18th (last) in the Eurovision Song Contest 1977.

For tax purposes, performers found a loophole in declaring "fantasy" outfits as deductibles to one's income, the reason being that it shouldn't be possible to wear the same outfit in your daily life. This led to many bands wearing highly extravagant matched outfits in their stage performances.

April 6, 1974 marks the start of a new era in Swedish pop music. First, Blue Swede reached No. 1 on the Billboard Hot 100 with their cover of the B. J. Thomas song "Hooked on a Feeling". The combo (fronted by iconic actor/singer Bjorn Skifs) also covered "Half Breed", "Never My Love", and "A Song For You"; as made famous by Cher, The Association, and The Carpenters, respectively. These renditions appeared on at least one "best-of" album, though never officially offered for sale anywhere beyond Europe.

The very same day, ABBA won the Eurovision Song Contest in Brighton, England, with "Waterloo". It was a big success throughout Europe, and reached number six on the Billboard Hot 100. Over the next few years ABBA had 18 consecutive top ten hits in the UK, nine of them reaching number one. Having sold an estimated 370 million units worldwide, ABBA became the best-selling band of the 1970s. In 1977, "Dancing Queen" became ABBA's only number one hit on the Billboard Hot 100. ABBA and Led Zeppelin are the only acts to have had 8 consecutive UK #1 albums.

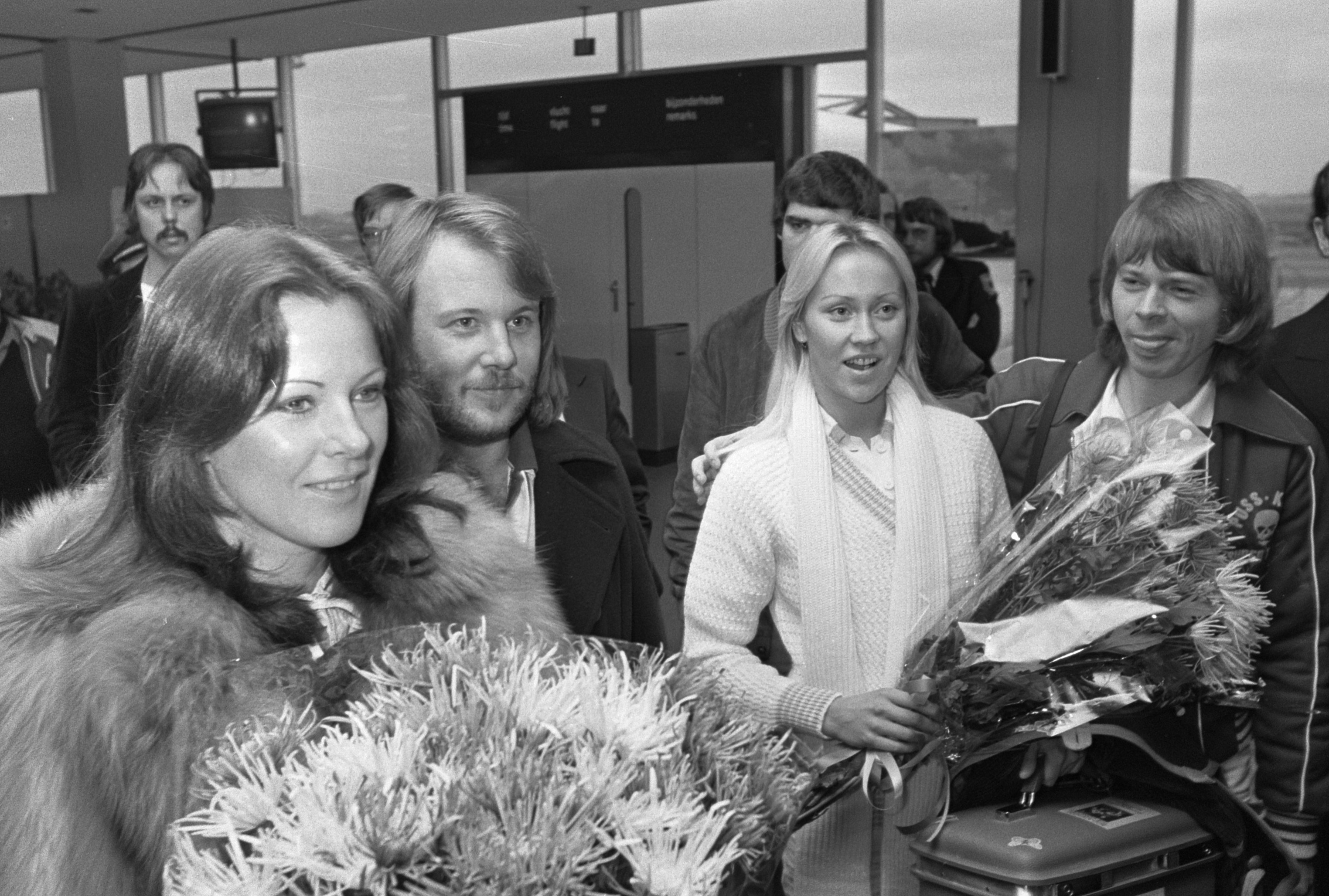
ABBA won the 1974 Eurovision Song Contest with their song "Waterloo" and soon became a world known phenomenon

Shortly after the release of their seventh album Super Trouper (1980), Benny Andersson and Anni-Frid Lyngstad of ABBA decided to end their marriage, just as Björn Ulvaeus and Agnetha Fältskog had done two years prior. This event did not stop the foursome from working together. ABBA's eighth album The Visitors was released in November 1981. Feeling that the energy was running out of the group, they decided to take a break in 1982. Fältskog and Lyngstad then both pursued solo careers. In 1982, Lyngstad released her first solo album in English, the Phil Collins produced Something's Going On. This was followed with the album Shine in 1984. Fältskog recorded three English solo albums during the 1980s, Wrap Your Arms Around Me (1983); Eyes of a Woman (1985), and I Stand Alone (1987). After a 17-year hiatus, Fältskog released My Colouring Book (2004), an album of 1960s cover versions. Her latest album A (2013) has been one of her most successful, earning her Platinum status in Sweden and Gold status in the UK, Germany and Australia.

Andersson and Ulvaeus collaborated with Tim Rice on the musical Chess which premiered in London in 1986. Two songs from the musical were hugely successful singles: "One Night in Bangkok" reached number three on the Billboard Hot 100, and "I Know Him So Well" topped the UK singles chart in February 1985.

In 1975, Harpo scored an international hit with the song Moviestar, with ABBA's Anni-Frid Lyngstad on backing vocals.

After a 35-year hiatus, it was announced in 2018 that ABBA had reunited and recorded two new songs for an upcoming "virtual" tour. In September 2021 they revealed a brand new studio album, Voyage, their first for 40 years. Released in November 2021, Voyage topped the album charts in numerous countries, including Australia, Germany and the UK.

=== 1980s: Europe, Roxette and Neneh Cherry ===
In 1986, Europe, a hard rock band from Upplands Väsby, hit number one in 25 countries (including the UK) with the song "The Final Countdown". The album of the same name also charted around the world and sold more than 7 million copies worldwide, 3 million copies in the United States alone. The single has sold 8 million copies. The following year included successful tours through Europe, Japan and the US. Their next album was Out of This World, which produced "Superstitious" as its biggest hit. This album sold about 3.5 million copies worldwide. These two multi-platinum albums placed Europe as one of the most successful hard rock bands in the world with album sales of more than 23 million records. After the release of Prisoners in Paradise, which sold only 1.2 million copies, Europe decided to take a break in 1992. They reformed in 2003 and produced six albums so far. They continue to record and tour.

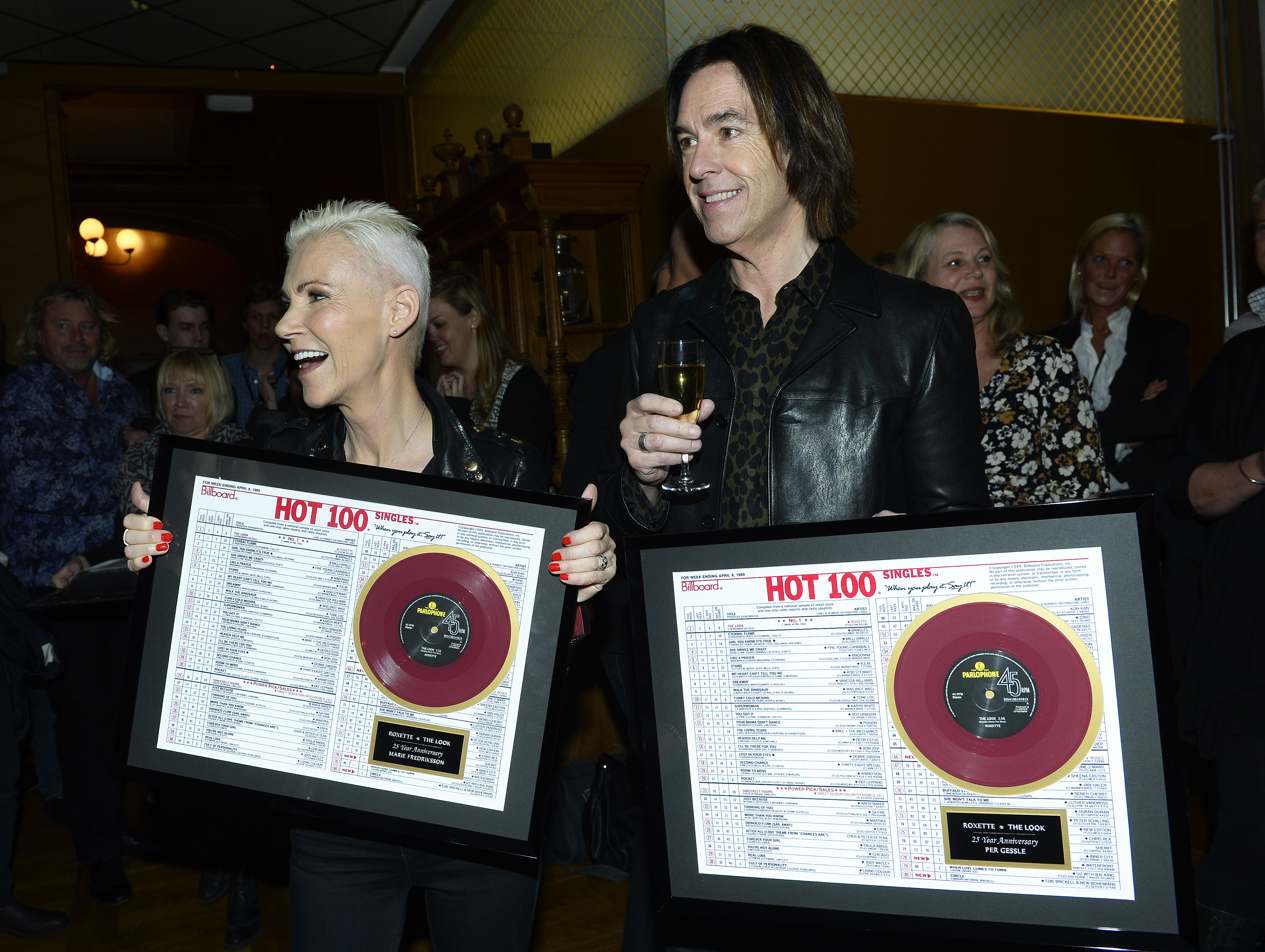
Between 1989 and 1991, Roxette had four number-one hits on the Billboard Hot 100 chart.

Marie Fredriksson and Per Gessle formed the band Roxette in 1986. Four of their songs, "The Look", "Listen To Your Heart" (both 1989), "It Must Have Been Love" (1990) and "Joyride" (1991), reached number one on the Billboard Hot 100, while two further singles, "Dangerous" (1990) and "Fading Like a Flower" (1991), both peaked at number two on the Billboard Hot 100. Roxette's "Join The Joyride World Tour 91–92" attracted 1.7 million people around the world. In 1993, they became the first non-English speaking band ever to play at MTV Unplugged. In 1995, they became the first Western band to be allowed to perform in China since Wham! in 1985.

In 2003, Roxette was honoured with achievement medals by Swedish King Carl XVI Gustaf "for appreciated achievements in Sweden and internationally". To date, their best-selling albums are Joyride (11 million units) and Look Sharp! (9 million units). Overall, the duo has sold more than 45 million albums and 25 million singles worldwide.

Neneh Cherry released the worldwide hit single "Buffalo Stance" in 1988. The song peaked at No. 3 on both the UK Singles Chart and the US Billboard Hot 100. Cherry's debut album Raw Like Sushi was released in 1989, experimenting with merging hiphop and mainstream dance-pop. The album was BRIT Certified Platinum four months after release. Cherry was nominated for "Best New Artist" with Buffalo Stance at the 1989 MTV Video Music Awards and the song was nominated for "International Hit of the Year" at the 1990 Ivor Novello Awards. Cherry's second single, "Manchild" (1989), peaked at No. 2 in Germany, and at No. 5 in the UK, and was a top-10 success in six more countries. The music video was nominated for "Best Video" at the 1990 Brit Awards. Her third single, "Kisses on the Wind" (1989), reached top-20 in seven countries including the US, where it peaked at No. 8 on the Billboard Hot 100. In 1990 Cherry won two Brit Awards, and she was also nominated for "Best New Artist" at the 1990 Grammy Awards. Cherry would be high on the charts again in 1994 with the single "7 Seconds", a duet with the Senegalese singer/songwriter Youssou N'Dour. The song reached top-3 on charts in 14 countries including France, where it stayed at No. 1 for a record 16 consecutive weeks on the Singles Chart. It won "Best Song" at the 1994 MTV Europe Music Awards and was nominated for "International Hit of the Year" at the 1995 Ivor Novello Awards. In 2015 Neneh Cherry was inducted into the Swedish Music Hall of Fame.

=== 1990s: The Cheiron phenomenon ===
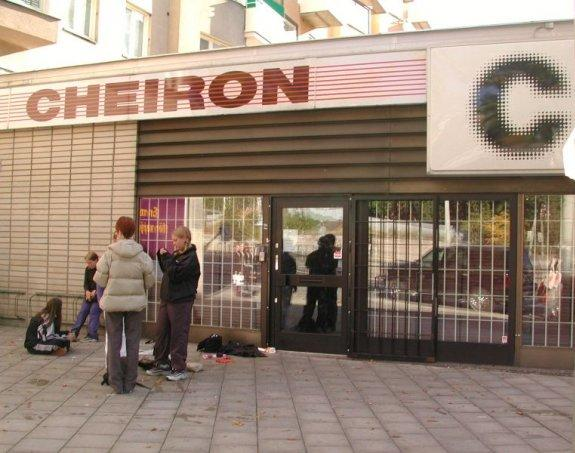
The tremendous impact of the Cheiron Studios on Swedish popular music is hard to overstate.

Since the 1990s, Sweden's influence on the international pop music scene has been most evident via a number of heavyweight songwriters and producers. Cheiron Studios, spearheaded by Denniz Pop and his protégé Max Martin, helped Ace of Base become an international success, and then went on to creating some of the biggest hits of Britney Spears, Backstreet Boys, NSYNC and Westlife, to name just a few. Denniz Pop died from cancer in 1998 and Cheiron Studios was closed two years later, but Martin remains a superstar in the industry - only Paul McCartney has written more #1 Billboard hits than Max Martin. Other prominent producers who were part of Cheiron include Carl Falk, Rami Yacoub, Kristian Lundin, Jörgen Elofsson, Per Magnusson and Andreas Carlsson.

Ace of Base's first album Happy Nation (reissued as The Sign) is one of the best-selling debut albums of all time, and was certified nine times platinum in the United States. The reggae-influenced song "The Sign" was added to the album at its reissue in the U.S. and became a huge hit. It spent six non-consecutive weeks at number one on the Billboard Hot 100 chart and even became the top song on Billboard's 1994 Year End Chart. Today Ace of Base's four studio albums have sold more than 30 million copies worldwide, making them the third-most successful Swedish band of all time after ABBA and Roxette.

Several other Cheiron-propelled Swedish music artists reached international success in the 1990s, such as Dr. Alban, eurodance rappers E-Type and Leila K, and not least Robyn who had her US breakthrough in 1997 with the hit songs "Do You Know (What It Takes)" and "Show Me Love".

However, not all success stories were created by Cheiron. Rock band The Cardigans was formed in Jönköping in 1992 and after steadily gaining popularity at home and in Japan, they became a global name in 1996 through their third album First Band on the Moon. The hit single Lovefool was featured on the soundtrack to the film Romeo + Juliet.

A*Teens were formed in 1998 as an ABBA tribute band. Their 1999 debut album The ABBA Generation consisted purely of ABBA covers and was a great success around the world. The album sold 3 million copies worldwide. The singles "Mamma Mia" (UK #12) and "Dancing Queen" (UK #21) topped the charts in Sweden. Their second album Teen Spirit (2001) contained new songs and was certified Gold in the United States.

Other notable Swedish acts who had international hits during this decade are Army of Lovers, Yaki-Da, Stakka Bo, Rednex, Eagle Eye Cherry, Emilia, Teddybears and Meja.

=== 2000s: Continued international success ===
The Cheiron legacy kept growing into the 21st century. Max Martin continued creating hit songs for stars like Britney Spears, Céline Dion and Pink, and he also helped bring forward new talented producers such as Shellback. Another producer who rose to fame during the 2000s is Swedish/Moroccan RedOne, who had huge success worldwide working alongside Lady Gaga, and later other American stars. He has been nominated for eight Grammy Awards and won two of those.

Robyn reappeared in 2007, after an absence of 10 years from the international music scene, with her No. 1 hit in the UK "With Every Heartbeat". The self-titled album was certified Gold in the UK and Platinum in Sweden. The following singles reached the charts as well: "Handle Me" (UK #17), "Be Mine" (UK #10) and "Who's That Girl" (UK #26). "Dream On", the follow-up with Christian Falk, was originally released in 2006 on his album People Say. It was re-released in the UK in November 2008 peaking at No. 21. Robyn also collaborated with Norwegian duo Röyksopp for the single "The Girl and the Robot" in June 2009.

A number of dance-oriented Swedish acts became internationally successful during this decade. In 2004, Swedish DJ and producer Eric Prydz topped the UK charts for five weeks with "Call on Me", while its 2007 follow up "Proper Education" was a #2 success. In 2008 Prydz had a hit with "Pjanoo", which also reached No. 2 in the UK (on download sales alone).

Basshunter is a Swedish singer, record producer and DJ. "Boten Anna" is a song with Swedish lyrics that had some success in continental Europe in 2006. In 2008 it reached number one in the UK with lyrics performed in English under the title "Now You're Gone". The second single "All I Ever Wanted" peaked at number two in the UK.

September is a Swedish dance-singer whose song "Cry For You" reached number five in the UK in 2008. In the 2010s, she released two albums under her true name, Petra Marklund, and relaunched herself as a Swedish-language pop artist rather than a Europop dance artist.

With "Crying at the Discoteque" the band Alcazar achieved success across Europe in 2000. It peaked at No. 3 in Germany and #13 in the UK. The follow-up singles failed to reach this success.

Another band which had success overseas were Play. Their biggest hit, "Us Against The World", sold over 500,000 copies. The song also featured in movies like The Master of Disguise and Holiday in the Sun, not forgetting the Lizzie McGuire series.

Rock band Mando Diao from Borlänge were very successful in Europe in 2009 with their song "Dance With Somebody" from the album Give Me Fire. It reached number three in Germany and was a major hit in Europe peaking at number 8 on the Billboard Eurochart Hot 100 Singles.

=== 2010s: EDM stars and strong female acts ===
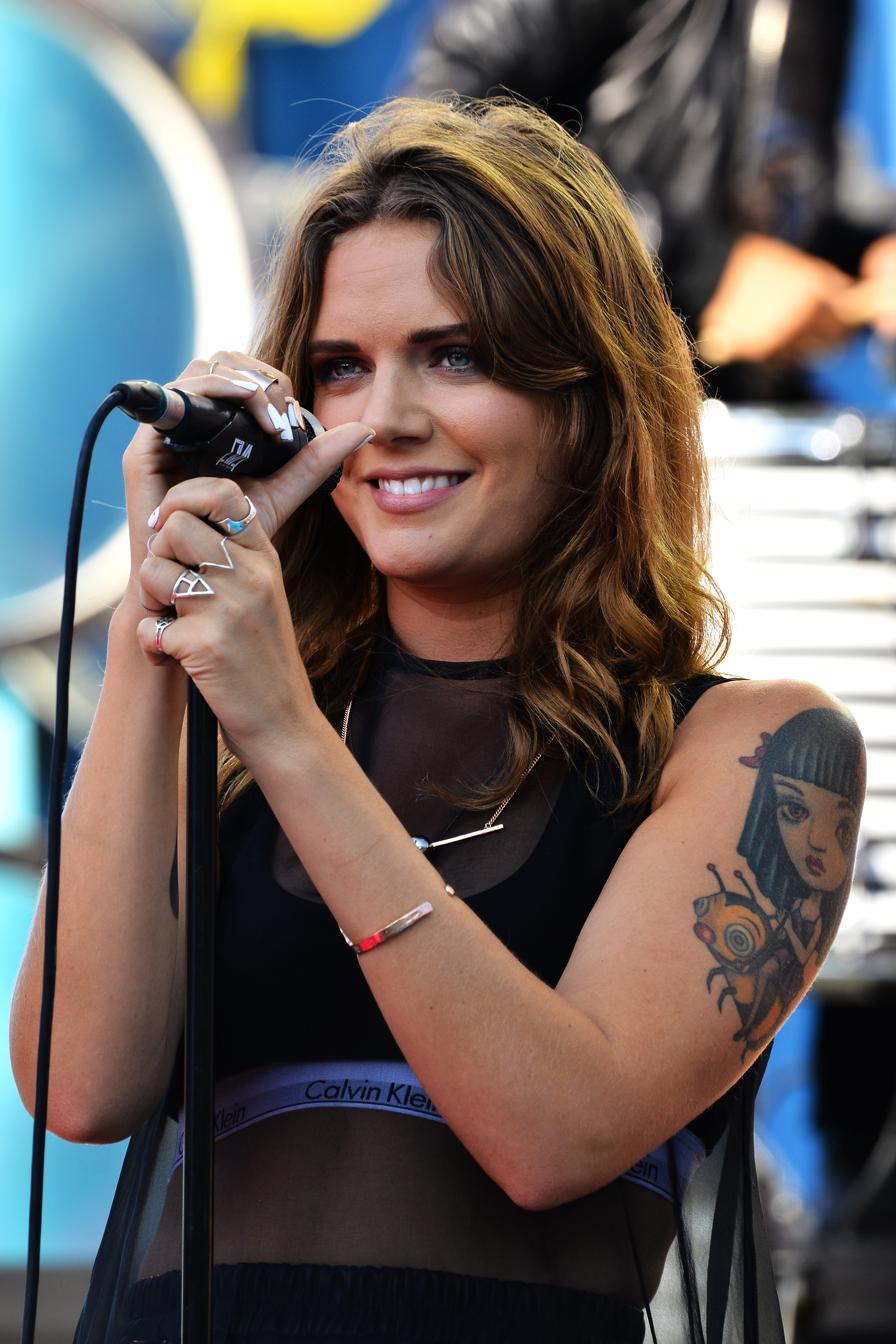
Tove Lo's "Habits (Stay High)" became a sleeper hit: it entered international music charts in 2014, one year after its original release.

2010 saw the rise of two major Swedish acts in electronic dance music (EDM). Swedish House Mafia, a supergroup collaboration between the Swedish DJs and producers Axwell, Steve Angello and Sebastian Ingrosso, released their first single "One", which was followed by a number of other hits including "Don't You Worry Child" which topped charts around the globe. Another DJ, Avicii got smash-hits with "Seek Bromance" and "Levels" being ranked fifth and first on Tomorrowland Top 1000. He was also ranked as third on the Top 100 DJs list multiple years. His most popular song "Wake Me Up" reached 3 billion streams on Spotify and 2.5 billion views on YouTube in 2026. Avicii, whose real name was Tim Bergling, released three successful albums, True, Stories, and Avīci (01) before his death at 28 years old in April of 2018.

The 2010s also saw successful releases from Agnes Carlsson and Robyn. Agnes, the winner of Sweden's Idol 2005, succeeded in Europe and especially the UK market in 2009/2010 with the single "Release Me", which entered the charts at number three and sold over 300,000 copies. It peaked at No. 6 on the Billboard Eurochart Hot 100 Singles. Carlsson was also signed to Universal Music/Interscope in the US, and started the promotion for the forthcoming album Dance Love Pop during the summer 2010. Robyn returned with her Body Talk series.

In 2011 the Swedish indie-artist Lykke Li released her second album Wounded Rhymes, and continued her success from her earlier Youth Novels with singles like "Get Some" and "I Follow Rivers", which topped the charts in Belgium and Romania.

Beginning in the 2000s, Veronica Maggio released several high-selling Swedish-language pop albums and continues to tour widely through Scandinavia.

In 2012, Swedish Eurovision Song Contest 2012 winner Loreen charted at number one in several countries across Europe with her song "Euphoria", making her one of the most successful winners of the contest in recent years.

In 2013, Swedish duo Icona Pop reached the top ten on the Billboard Hot 100 and number-one on the UK Singles Chart with their song "I Love It". The song was certified gold in the United Kingdom and 2× platinum in the United States, selling 400,000 and 2,025,000 copies, respectively. Icona Pop's Caroline Hjelt is close friends with singer/songwriter Tove Lo, who had her international breakthrough shortly afterwards. Tove Lo charted at number 3 on Billboard Hot 100 with her song "Habits (Stay High)" and the song was certified 5× Platinum in the United States.

Swedish singer-songwriter Zara Larsson released her debut EP album Introducing in January 2013. She later featured in the official song of UEFA Euro 2016, David Guetta's "This One's for You". Her album So Good produced eight singles and she charted at number 13 on the Billboard Hot 100 with "Never Forget You"; the song was certified 2× Platinum in the United States. Her biggest hit, however, is "Lush Life" with over 875 million views on YouTube and 1.9 billion streams on Spotify; the song would later have a huge resurgence in the mid-2020s, owing to a viral dance trend which began during Larsson's Midnight Sun Tour in 2025.

In 2015, Måns Zelmerlöw won the Eurovision Song Contest 2015 with his song "Heroes". The song charted in the multiple countries around Europe and Australia, peaking at number 11 in the United Kingdom.

== Styles ==
=== Dance music ===
Ace of Base had the world's best-selling debut album with 23 million in sales for Happy Nation. They achieved major success in the 1990s with popular songs such as "All That She Wants" (1993), "The Sign", "Don't Turn Around" (both 1994) and "Cruel Summer" (1998). All four songs reached the Top 10 of the Billboard Hot 100; "The Sign" spent six weeks at number one.

In the early 1990s the Swedish dance scene was very vivid. Denniz Pop was Sweden's most wanted producer of that time. In 1990 he produced Dr. Alban's first record "Hello Africa" together with Leila K. The song became a hit in mainland Europe peaking at No. 5 in Germany.

In 1992 Denniz Pop produced the second album by Dr. Alban, One Love which includes the worldwide hits "It's My Life" and "Sing Hallelujah". . That same year Leila K released her hit single "Open Sesame" (UK #23, Germany #5). This was followed in 1993 by a cover version of Plastic Bertrand's "Ça Plane Pour Moi" (Germany #13).

1994 saw the release of Dr. Alban's third album Look Who's Talking; the title track was a big hit throughout Europe (Germany #3).

Rednex had several hit songs mixing country music and eurodance. The song "Cotton Eye Joe" was an international hit in 1994 reaching number one in the UK. The ballad "Wish You Were Here" was released in 1995.

The Hellacopters, a garage rock band that was formed by Nicke Andersson, was also formed in 1995.

=== Swedish pop music ===
In 1996 The Cardigans released their third album, First Band on the Moon. The song "Lovefool" was included on the soundtrack of William Shakespeare's Romeo + Juliet by director Baz Luhrmann. It found international success peaking at No. 2 on the UK Singles Chart. The following album, Gran Turismo (1998), was more electronic in style and contained the hit singles "My Favourite Game" and "Erase/Rewind".

"You and Me Song", by Swedish group The Wannadies, was a huge radio hit in the UK and Ireland in the mid-1990s. This song also ended up featuring on the Romeo + Juliet soundtrack.

Robyn was 17 years old when her pop singles "Show Me Love" and "Do You Know (What It Takes)" were released in 1997. Both singles were Top 10 hits on the Billboard Hot 100.

In 1998 Meja's second album Seven Sisters was released. It contained the radio hit "All Bout The Money", which was peaked at No. 12 in the UK. In 1999 she recorded the duet "Private Emotion" with Ricky Martin, which reached No. 9 on the UK singles chart.

Eagle-Eye Cherry released his debut album Desireless in 1998. Propelled by the hit single "Save Tonight" (UK #5, US #6), the album sold over 4 million copies worldwide.

Emilia Rydberg is well known for her 1998-1999 international hit "Big Big World". The song peaked at No. 5 in the UK.

Andreas Johnson had a UK #4 hit in 2000 with "Glorious".

Swedish songwriters/producers Denniz Pop and Max Martin have written worldwide hits for pop artists like Britney Spears, Backstreet Boys and later Celine Dion, Kelly Clarkson, Katy Perry, P!nk, Avril Lavigne, Leona Lewis and Jessie J.

=== Indie pop and rock ===
In the 2000s some indie bands from Sweden found their way to the international music scene.

Singer Nina Persson from The Cardigans launched a solo project in 2001 under the name A Camp. The lead single "I Can Buy You" peaking at number 46 in the UK chart. In 2003, The Cardigans returned with their album Long Gone Before Daylight, a quieter, more ambient collection of songs. In Sweden it was certified 2× platinum and the band won two Swedish Grammy Awards.

José González is a Swedish indie folk singer-songwriter of Argentine descent. His cover of "Heartbeats", originally by his fellow Swedes The Knife, was a hit on the UK singles chart where it peaked at number nine in 2003.

The Tallest Man on Earth is the stage name of Swedish folk singer songwriter Kristian Matsson.

Indie band The Concretes first appeared in the UK Singles Chart in 2004 with "You Can't Hurry Love" (#55) and "Seem Fine" (#52). Lead singer Victoria Bergsman left the group in 2006 and, with Peter, Bjorn and John, recorded the single "Young Folks" the same year. This reached No. 35 in the UK singles chart, and was re-issued the following year, this time peaking at No. 13.

On the national scene, Kent are by many seen as the greatest rock band, having sold more than 3 million copies of their albums and repeatedly been awarded best group of the year awards. Håkan Hellström can in some way be seen as a solo artist counterpart, having gained both public and critical acclaim.

Other notable artists include Refused, Air France, Bob Hund, CEO, Dunge, Eskobar, Fever Ray, First Aid Kit, The Hives, Jens Lekman, The Knife, Komeda, Life on Earth, Little Dragon, Lykke Li, The Radio Dept., Shout Out Louds, The Soundtrack of Our Lives, The Sounds, The Tough Alliance, The Field, and Avner.

== Eurovision Song Contest ==
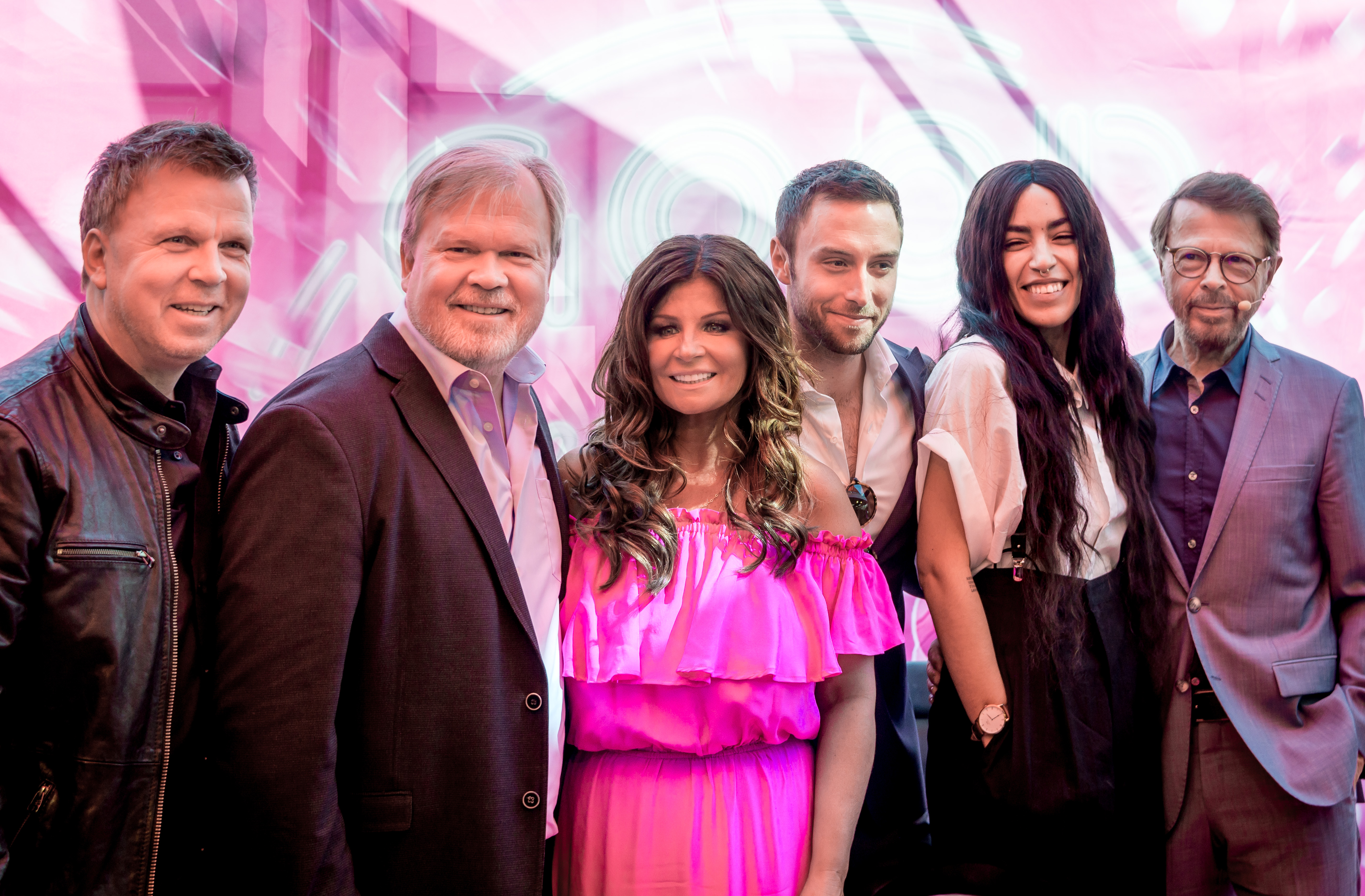
Five Swedish Eurovision winner acts represented in one image. From left: Richard and Per Herrey, Carola Häggkvist, Måns Zelmerlöw, Loreen and ABBA's Björn Ulvaeus.

Sweden has participated in the Eurovision Song Contest 61 times since making its debut in 1958, missing only three contests since then (1964, 1970 and 1976). Sweden is tied with Ireland for the most Eurovision wins, being seven in total:

- 1974 – ABBA with "Waterloo";
- 1984 – Herreys with "Diggi-Loo Diggi-Ley";
- 1991 – Carola Häggkvist with "Fångad av en stormvind";
- 1999 – Charlotte Nilsson with "Take Me To Your Heaven";
- 2012 – Loreen with "Euphoria";
- 2015 – Måns Zelmerlöw with "Heroes".
- 2023 – Loreen with "Tattoo";

Sweden is the contest's most successful country of the 21st century, with three wins from ten top five results. In total, Sweden has achieved 27 top five results in the contest. Since 1959, the Swedish entry has been chosen through an annual televised competition, known since 1967 as Melodifestivalen. Sweden has hosted the Eurovision Song Contest seven times and is the only country to have hosted the event in six different decades, three times in Stockholm (1975, 2000, and 2016), three times in Malmö (1992, 2013 and 2024), and once in Gothenburg (1985).

== Charts and sales ==
=== Top 30 most streamed Swedish acts on Spotify ===
The streaming figures in total from Spotify from January 2026, including lead, solo, and features. Additional YouTube channel views as of May 15, 2026.

Rank	Swedish acts	Streams	Global rank	Songs with 100 million+ streams	YouTube Views
1.	Avicii	20.1 billion+	95	27	12.3 billion+
2.	Zara Larsson	11.9 billion+	227	24	7.3 billion+
3.	ABBA	11.7 billion+	240	22	6.3 billion+
4.	Tove Lo	8.7 billion+	356	12	3.2 billion+
5.	Alesso	7.4 billion+	421	18	1.4 billion+
6.	Galantis	6.3 billion+	533	10	2.1 billion+
7.	Swedish House Mafia	5.9 billion+	569	12	2.4 billion+
8.	Ghost	4.3 billion+	812	8	1.7 billion+
9.	Sabaton	4.3 billion+	825	6	2.2 billion+
10.	Axwell	4.0 billion+	867	7	42 million+
11.	Sebastian Ingrosso	3.9 billion+	893	7	85 million+
12.	Roxette	3.9 billion+	912	8	3.0 billion+
13.	Mabel	3.8 billion+	996	9	1.1 billion+
14.	Axwell /\ Ingrosso	3.1 billion+	1192	5	1.4 billion+
15.	Lykke Li	3.0 billion+	1304	7	518 million+
16.	A7S	2.9 billion+	1317	3	64 million+
17.	Sandro Cavazza	2.8 billion+	1371	4	91 million+
18.	Icona Pop	2.7 billion+	1439	3	536 million+
19.	Mike Perry	2.4 billion+	1513	6	361 million+
20.	John Martin	2.4 billion+	1514	4	40 million+
21.	NOTD	2.1 billion+	1848	5	183 million+
22.	Veronica Maggio	2.1 billion+	1868	2	47 million+
23.	José González	2.0 billion+	1884	3	125 million+
24.	The Cardigans	1.9 billion+	1948	4	573 million+
25.	Hov1	1.9 billion+	2049	1	45 million+
26.	Ace of Base	1.8 billion+	2070	4	1.5 billion+
27.	In Flames	1.8 billion+	2099	1	217 million+
28.	Yung Lean	1.8 billion+	2113	2	542 million+
29.	shy martin	1.7 billion+	2260	2	53 million+
30.	Loreen	1.7 billion+	2376	4	761 million+

=== Top 15 biggest selling Swedish acts ===
The sales figures are estimated and count together album and single sales.

Rank	Swedish acts	Sold	Genre	Years active
1.	ABBA	500 million +	Pop • pop rock • disco	1972–1982, 2018–present
2.	Roxette	75 million +	Pop rock • soft rock • pop • dance pop	1986–2019
3.	Ace of Base	50 million +	Dance-pop • eurodance • europop	1990–present
4.	Avicii	35 million+	EDM • progressive house • electro house	2006–2018
5.	Zara Larsson	30 million+	Pop • dance-pop • R&B	2008–present
6.	Europe	25 million+	Hard rock • glam metal • blues rock • arena rock	1979–1992, 1999, 2003–present
7.	Tove Lo	20 million+	Electropop • dance-pop • indie pop	2006–present
8.	Spotnicks	18 million+	Instrumental rock	1958–2019
9.	The Cardigans	15 million +	Alternative rock • pop rock • indie rock	1992–present
10.	Dr Alban	14 million	Eurodance • hip hop • reggae • dancehall	1980s–present
11.	Alcazar	12 million	Nu-disco • dance-pop • europop • schlager	1998–2005, 2007–2011, 2013–2018
12.	Vikingarna	11 million	Dansband	1958–2004, 2016–present
13.	Swedish House Mafia	10 million	House • progressive house • electro house	2008–2013, 2018–present
14.	Rednex	10 million	Eurodance • electronic country	1994–present
15.	Army of Lovers	7 million	Dance-pop • europop	1987–1996, 2001–2009, 2012–present

=== Album sales by country ===
This tables shows the album sales by country. The worldwide album sales are estimated while the album sales for UK, US and Germany are counted by the gold and platinum certifications for the albums in that country. For Germany, the old certifications were used for albums released before September 1999 with Gold (250,000) and Platinum (500,000).

Rank	artist	worldwide album sales	UK album sales	US album sales	German album sales
1	ABBA	120,000,000	7,160,000	10,500,000	9,800,000
2	Roxette	45,000,000	1,660,000	2,700,000	4,900,000
3	Ace of Base	32,000,000	660,000	10,000,000	1,750,000

=== Top selling Swedish studio and compilation albums ===
Rank	Year	Album	Artist	Sales
1.	1992	Gold	ABBA	30 million +
2.	1993	The Sign / Happy Nation	Ace of Base	23 million +
3.	1991	Joyride	Roxette	12 million +
4.	1976	Greatest Hits Vol. I	ABBA	11.3 million +
5.	1976	Arrival	ABBA	10 million +
6.	1988	Look Sharp!	Roxette	10 million +
7.	1980	Super Trouper	ABBA	7.5 million +
8.	1979	Voulez-Vous	ABBA	7 million +
9.	1978	The Album	ABBA	7 million +
10.	1992	Tourism	Roxette	7 million +

=== US and UK hit singles ===
This is a list of songs which reached the top 200 on the UK singles chart or the Billboard Hot 100, as well as other notable global hits.

Year	Title	Peak Chart Position		Artist
Year	Title	UK Singles Chart	US Billboard Hot 100	Artist
1960	"Scandinavian Shuffle"	—	101	The Swe-Danes
1962	"Orange Blossom Special"	29	—	The Spotnicks
1962	"Rocket Man"	38	—	The Spotnicks
1963	"Hava Nagila"	13	—	The Spotnicks
1963	"Just Listen To My Heart"	36	—	The Spotnicks
1963	"After You've Gone"	43	—	Alice Babs
1964	"Sole Sole Sole" (with Umberto Marcato)	—	58	Siw Malmkvist
1969	"Let's Dance"	—	92	Ola & the Janglers
1972	"The Baby" (featuring Mikael Rickfors)	26	—	The Hollies
1972	"Long Dark Road" (featuring Mikael Rickfors)	—	26	The Hollies
1973	"Magic Woman Touch" (featuring Mikael Rickfors)	—	60	The Hollies
1974	"Waterloo"	1	6	ABBA
1974	"Ring Ring" (Remix)	32	—	ABBA
1974	"Honey, Honey"	133	27	ABBA
1974	"Y Viva España"	4	—	Sylvia
1974	"Hooked on a Feeling"	90	1	Blue Swede
1974	"Silly Milly"	—	71	Blue Swede
1974	"Never My Love"	—	7	Blue Swede
1975	"Hush/I'm Alive" (mash-up)	—	61	Blue Swede
1975	"I Do, I Do, I Do, I Do, I Do"	38	15	ABBA
1975	"SOS"	6	15	ABBA
1975	"Mamma Mia"	1	32	ABBA
1975	"Hasta La Vista"	38	—	Sylvia
1976	"Moviestar"	24	—	Harpo
1976	"Fernando"	1	13	ABBA
1976	"Dancing Queen"	1	1	ABBA
1976	"Money, Money, Money"	3	56	ABBA
1977	"Knowing Me, Knowing You"	1	14	ABBA
1977	"The Name of the Game"	1	12	ABBA
1978	"Take a Chance on Me"	1	3	ABBA
1978	"Summer Night City"	5	—	ABBA
1979	"Chiquitita"	2	29	ABBA
1979	"Does Your Mother Know"	4	19	ABBA
1979	"Voulez-Vous"	3	80	ABBA
1979	"Angeleyes"	3	64	ABBA
1979	"Gimme! Gimme! Gimme! (A Man After Midnight)"	3	—	ABBA
1979	"I Have a Dream"	2	—	ABBA
1980	"The Winner Takes It All"	1	8	ABBA
1980	"Super Trouper"	1	45	ABBA
1981	"Lay All Your Love on Me"	7	—	ABBA
1981	"One of Us"	3	107	ABBA
1982	"When All Is Said and Done"	—	27	ABBA
1982	"Head Over Heels"	25	—	ABBA
1982	"The Visitors"	—	63	ABBA
1982	"The Day Before You Came"	32	—	ABBA
1982	"Under Attack"	26	—	ABBA
1982	"I Know There's Something Going On"	43	13	Frida
1982	"You Can"	—	77	Madleen Kane
1983	"Thank You for the Music"	33	—	ABBA
1983	"The Heat Is On"	35	—	Agnetha Fältskog
1983	"Wrap Your Arms Around Me"	44	—	Agnetha Fältskog
1983	"Can't Shake Loose"	63	29	Agnetha Fältskog
1983	"Fedora (I'll be your dawg)"	56	—	Caramba
1983	"Here We'll Stay"	100	102	Frida
1984	"Shine"	82	—	Frida
1984	"Diggi-Loo Diggi-Ley"	46	—	Herreys
1985	"I Won't Let You Go"	84	—	Agnetha Fältskog
1986	"Just Like That"	79	—	Gemini
1986	"The Final Countdown"	1	8	Europe
1987	"I Wasn't the One (Who Said Goodbye)" (featuring Peter Cetera)	—	93	Agnetha Fältskog
1987	"Slow Train to Dawn" (featuring Neneh Cherry)	64	—	The The
1987	"Rock The Night"	12	30	Europe
1987	"Carrie"	22	3	Europe
1987	"Cherokee"	—	72	Europe
1988	"Superstitious"	34	31	Europe
1988	"Open Your Heart"	86	—	Europe
1988	"The Last Time"	77	—	Agnetha Fältskog
1988	"Heaven Tonight / Riot in the Dungeons"	86	—	Yngwie J. Malmsteen's Rising Force
1988	"Buffalo Stance"	3	3	Neneh Cherry
1989	"Manchild"	5	—	Neneh Cherry
1989	"Kisses on the Wind"	20	8	Neneh Cherry
1989	"Heart"	—	73	Neneh Cherry
1989	"Inna City Mamma"	31	—	Neneh Cherry
1989	"Let the Good Times Rock"	85	—	Europe
1989	"Got to Get" (featuring Leila K)	8	48	Rob'n'Raz
1989	"The Look"	7	1	Roxette
1989	"Dressed for Success"	18	14	Roxette
1989	"Listen to Your Heart"	6	1	Roxette
1989	"Dangerous"	6	2	Roxette
1990	"It Must Have Been Love"	3	1	Roxette
1990	"Let's Get Busy (Pump It Up)" (featuring Quartz)	86	—	Clubland
1990	"We're On This Case"	97	—	Da Yeene
1990	"I've Got You Under My Skin"	25	—	Neneh Cherry
1990	"Rok the Nation" (featuring Leila K)	41	—	Rob'n'Raz
1990	"After the Rain"	60	—	Titiyo
1990	"Flowers"	71	—	Titiyo
1991	"My Body Says Yes"	—	42	Titiyo
1991	"Come Back (For Real Love) (The Remix)" (featuring Papa Dee)	53	—	Alison Limerick
1991	"Obsession"	67	—	Army of Lovers
1991	"Joyride"	4	1	Roxette
1991	"Fading Like a Flower (Every Time You Leave)"	12	2	Roxette
1991	"The Big L."	21	—	Roxette
1991	"Spending My Time"	22	32	Roxette
1992	"Church of Your Heart"	21	36	Roxette
1992	"How Do You Do!"	13	58	Roxette
1992	"Queen of Rain"	28	—	Roxette
1992	"Hold On (Tighter to Love)"	—	79	Clubland
1992	"Set Me Free"	—	90	Clubland
1992	"Around The World"	84	—	Da Yeene
1992	"It's My Life"	2	88	Dr. Alban
1992	"One Love"	45	—	Dr. Alban
1992	"I'll Cry for You"	28	—	Europe
1992	"Halfway to Heaven"	42	—	Europe
1992	"Bad Bad Boys"	—	98	Midi, Maxi & Efti
1992	"Money Love"	23	—	Neneh Cherry
1992	"Ain't No Substitute"	97	—	Papa Dee
1992	"Understand This Groove"	—	58	Sound Factory
1992	"Ride the Bullet"	67	—	Army of Lovers
1992	"Crucified"	31	—	Army of Lovers
1993	"Israelism"	85	—	Army of Lovers
1993	"I Am"	96	—	Army of Lovers
1993	"The Truth"	77	—	Clawfinger
1993	"Sing Hallelujah"	16	—	Dr. Alban
1993	"I'll Be There for You (Doya Dododo Doya)"	29	—	House Of Virginism (Fredrik "Apollo" Asplund)
1993	"Happy" (featuring Meja)	—	68	Legacy of Sound
1993	"Open Sesame"	23	—	Leila K
1993	"Ça plane pour moi"	69	—	Leila K
1993	"Buddy X"	35	43	Neneh Cherry
1993	"Highland"	80	—	One More Time
1993	"Show Me Love" (Club Mix) (remixed by StoneBridge)	6	5	Robin S.
1993	"Almost Unreal"	7	94	Roxette
1993	"2 the Rhythm" (featuring James Gicho as St. James)	72	111	Sound Factory
1993	"Here We Go" (featuring Nana Hedin and Katarina Henryson as Katarina Wilczewski)	13	109	Stakka Bo
1993	"Down the Drain"	64	—	Stakka Bo
1993	"All That She Wants"	1	2	Ace of Base
1993	"Wheel of Fortune"	20	—	Ace of Base
1993	"Happy Nation"	40	—	Ace of Base
1994	"The Sign"	2	1	Ace of Base
1994	"Don't Turn Around"	5	4	Ace of Base
1994	"Living In Danger"	18	20	Ace of Base
1994	"Alrabaiye (Take Me Up)" (featuring Swing, Dr. Alban and Nana Hedin)	82	—	Amadin (John Amatiello and Kristian Lundin)
1994	"Touch"	92	—	Basic Element
1994	"Every Day"	166	—	Brainpool
1994	"Warfair"	54	—	Clawfinger
1994	"Look Who's Talking" (featuring Nana Hedin)	55	—	Dr. Alban
1994	"Away from Home"	42	—	Dr. Alban
1994	"Reachin'"	35	—	House Of Virginism (Fredrik "Apollo" Asplund)
1994	"7 Seconds" (with Youssou N'Dour)	3	98	Neneh Cherry
1994	"Cotton Eye Joe"	1	25	Rednex
1994	"In Command" (featuring Lutricia McNeal and D-Flex)	87	—	Rob'n'Raz
1994	"Good Time"	77	112	Sound Factory
1994	"Something Nice"	100	—	Stina Nordenstam
1994	"Tell Me (I'm Not Dreaming)"	45	—	Titiyo
1994	"Hobo Humpin' Slobo Babe"	15	102	Whale
1994	"Sleeping In My Car"	14	50	Roxette
1994	"Crash! Boom! Bang!"	24	—	Roxette
1994	"Fireworks"	30	—	Roxette
1994	"Run to You"	27	—	Roxette
1995	"Vulnerable"	44	—	Roxette
1995	"The Look '95" (Remix)	28	—	Roxette
1995	"Lucky Love"	20	30	Ace of Base
1995	"Beautiful Life"	15	15	Ace of Base
1995	"It Should Have Been You" (featuring Titiyo & Jennifer Brown)	83	—	Blacknuss
1995	"Pin Me Down"	87	—	Clawfinger
1995	"Peace of Luv"	148	—	Clubland
1995	"This Is the Way" (featuring Nana Hedin)	53	—	E-Type
1995	"Tonight Is the Night"	—	68	Le Click
1995	"Love Can Build a Bridge" (with Cher, Chrissie Hynde and Eric Clapton)	1	—	Neneh Cherry
1995	"Old Pop in an Oak"	12	—	Rednex
1995	"Wild 'N Free"	55	—	Rednex
1995	"Rolling Home"	81	—	Rednex
1995	"Sweet Dreams" (featuring Dr. Alban)	59	—	Swing
1995	"You and Me Song"	18	—	The Wannadies
1995	"Might Be Stars"	51	—	The Wannadies
1995	"I'll Do Ya"	53	—	Whale
1995	"I Saw You Dancing"	—	54	Yaki-Da
1995	"Carnival"	35	—	The Cardigans
1995	"Sick & Tired"	34	—	The Cardigans
1996	"Rise and Shine"	29	—	The Cardigans
1996	"Lovefool"	2	2	The Cardigans
1996	"Been It"	56	—	The Cardigans
1996	"Never Gonna Say I'm Sorry"	—	106	Ace of Base
1996	"Innocent"	42	—	Addis Black Widow
1996	"Give My Life"	135	—	Army of Lovers
1996	"Exclusive"	67	—	House Of Virginism (Fredrik "Apollo" Asplund)
1996	"Release the Pressure (1996)" (featuring Earl Sixteen, DJ Cheshire Cat and Papa Dee)	13	—	Leftfield
1996	"Woman"	9	—	Neneh Cherry
1996	"Kootchi"	38	—	Neneh Cherry
1996	"Good Thing"	87	—	Rebecka Törnqvist
1996	"I Do"	141	—	Rebecka Törnqvist
1996	"Soul Rising" (featuring UK singer Nevada Cato)	168	—	Rhythm Inc. (Johan Strandqvist)
1996	"You've Got That Somethin'"	54	—	Robyn
1996	"You Don't Understand Me"	42	—	Roxette
1996	"June Afternoon"	52	—	Roxette
1996	"You and Him"	92	—	Sophie Zelmani
1996	"Great Blondino"	192	—	Stakka Bo
1996	"Ask The Mountains" (featuring Stina Nordenstam)	77	—	Vangelis
1996	"How Does It Feel?"	53	—	The Wannadies
1996	"Someone Somewhere"	38	—	The Wannadies
1997	"Hit"	20	—	The Wannadies
1997	"Shorty"	41	—	The Wannadies
1997	"Dinah" (featuring Stephen Simmonds, ADL, Richie Pasta and Mike Muladoe)	56	—	Blacknuss
1997	"Last Night a D.J. Saved My Life" (C&J Mix) (featuring Nai-Jee-Ria and ADL)	199	—	Blacknuss
1997	"Your New Cuckoo"	35	—	The Cardigans
1997	"Biggest & The Best"	94	—	Clawfinger
1997	"Love Is a Wonderful Thing"	160	—	Fatima Rainey
1997	"Call Me"	38	35	Le Click
1997	"Don't Go"	—	62	Le Click
1997	"Feel It"	68	—	Neneh Cherry
1997	"Do You Know (What It Takes)"	26	7	Robyn
1998	"Show Me Love"	8	7	Robyn
1998	"Do You Really Want Me (Show Respect)"	20	—	Robyn
1998	"In My Mind"	87	—	Antiloop
1998	"Look at You"	88	—	Backyard Babies
1998	"Bombed (Out of My Mind)"	95	—	Backyard Babies
1998	"Highlights"	79	—	Backyard Babies
1998	"My Favourite Game"	14	—	The Cardigans
1998	"Two Sides"	79	—	Clawfinger
1998	"Relax"	11	—	Deetah
1998	"Get Up (On the Dancefloor)"	180	—	Disco Dude (Johan "JJ" Järpsten)
1998	"Save Tonight"	6	5	Eagle-Eye Cherry
1998	"Falling in Love Again"	8	—	Eagle-Eye Cherry
1998	"Big Big World"	5	92	Emilia
1998	"Hold It Now, Hit It" (Remix)	131	—	Johan S. (Johan Strandqvist aka Rhythm Inc.)
1998	"If You Were Here"	158	—	Kent
1998	"Can't Have You" (featuring Kayo)	54	70	Lyte Funkie Ones (LFO)
1998	"All 'Bout the Money"	12	—	Meja
1998	"Firmament Vacation (A Soundtrack of Our Lives)"	96	—	The Soundtrack of Our Lives
1998	"Instant Repeater '99" (Remix)	156	—	The Soundtrack of Our Lives
1998	"Get Down"	83	—	Stephen Simmonds
1998	"Tears Never Dry" (featuring Lisa Nilsson)	77	—	Stephen Simmonds
1998	"Four Big Speakers" (featuring Bus 75)	69	—	Whale
1998	"Crying at Airports"	94	—	Whale
1998	"Cruel Summer"	8	10	Ace of Base
1998	"Life Is a Flower"/"Whenever You're Near Me"	5	76	Ace of Base
1998	"Always Have, Always Will"	12	—	Ace of Base
1999	"Everytime It Rains"	22	—	Ace of Base
1999	"Mamma Mia"	12	—	A★TEENS
1999	"Super Trouper"	21	—	A★TEENS
1999	"Erase/Rewind"	7	—	The Cardigans
1999	"Hanging Around"	17	—	The Cardigans
1999	"Burning Down the House" (with Tom Jones)	7	—	The Cardigans
1999	"Take Me to Your Heaven"	20	—	Charlotte Nilsson
1999	"And It Hurts"	63	—	Da Yeene
1999	"El Paraiso Rico"	39	—	Deetah
1999	"Good Sign"	54	—	Emilia
1999	"The Final Countdown 2000"	36	—	Europe
1999	"Tuesday Afternoon"	57	—	Jennifer Brown
1999	"Alive"	151	—	Jennifer Brown
1999	"How Will I Know (Who You Are)"	47	—	Jessica Folcker
1999	"747"	61	—	Kent
1999	"Buddy X 99" (Dreem House Edit) (versus Dreem Teem)	15	—	Neneh Cherry
1999	"Wish I Could Fly"	11	—	Roxette
1999	"Stars"	56	—	Roxette
1999	"Colour the World" (featuring Dr. Alban)	15	—	Sash!
1999	"People Are Strange"	169	—	Stina Nordenstam
1999	"Deliver the Juice"	133	—	Whale
1999	"Permanent Tears"	43	—	Eagle-Eye Cherry
2000	"Are You Still Having Fun?"	21	—	Eagle-Eye Cherry
2000	"Long Way Around" (featuring Neneh Cherry)	48	—	Eagle-Eye Cherry
2000	"Glorious"	4	—	Andreas Johnson
2000	"The Games We Play"	41	—	Andreas Johnson
2000	"Make It Right" (featuring Demetreus)	22	—	Christian Falk
2000	"Campione 2000"	58	—	E-Type
2000	"Theme from Randall & Hopkirk (Deceased)" (with David Arnold)	49	—	Nina Persson
2000	"1.2.3.4 Get with the Wicked" (featuring Deetah)	10	—	Richard Blackwood
2000	"Private Emotion" (featuring Meja)	9	67	Ricky Martin
2000	"Yeah"	56	—	The Wannadies
2000	"Dancing Queen"	—	95	A★TEENS
2001	"Upside Down"	10	93	A★TEENS
2001	"Halfway Around the World"	30	—	A★TEENS
2001	"I Can Buy You"	46	—	A Camp
2001	"Everybody Doesn't"	—	81	Amanda
2001	"Let Me Love You"	—	124	Da Buzz
2001	"It's Yours / Return to 125th Street" (featuring Lemon D)	196	—	Eskobar
2001	"Milk and Toast and Honey"	89	—	Roxette
2001	"Crying at the Discoteque"	13	—	Alcazar
2002	"Sexual Guarantee"	30	—	Alcazar
2002	"Braided Hair" (featuring Neneh Cherry and Speech)	78	—	1 Giant Leap
2002	"Pitiful"	171	—	Blindside
2002	"What Bass / Switch" (featuring Lemon D)	87	—	Eskobar
2002	"Hate to Say I Told You So"	23	86	The Hives
2002	"Main Offender"	24	—	The Hives
2002	"Die, All Right! / Supply and Demand"	133	—	The Hives
2002	"On Top of Your World"	108	—	Sahara Hotnights
2002	"Sister Surround"	80	—	The Soundtrack of Our Lives
2002	"21st Century Rip Off"	114	—	The Soundtrack of Our Lives
2002	"EP 2: Tha Get Down / Tonight / Deeper Still"	98	—	Eric Prydz
2003	"EP 3: Slammin' / Inner Space"	81	—	Eric Prydz
2003	"Dancin' Tonight" (featuring Nevada Cato)	36	—	The Attic (as Stereopol)
2003	"High Energy" (Remix) (featuring Evelyn Thomas)	113	—	Axwell
2003	"Jerk It Out"	8	70	Caesars
2003	"For What It's Worth"	31	—	The Cardigans
2003	"You're the Storm"	74	—	The Cardigans
2003	"Skull Tattoo"	158	—	Eagle-Eye Cherry
2003	"Summer Sun" (featuring Yukimi Nagano)	141	—	Koop
2003	"A Thing About You"	77	—	Roxette
2003	"Skin"	101	—	The Wannadies
2003	"Disko"	131	—	The Wannadies
2003	"Rock 'N' Roll Lies"	56	—	Razorlight
2004	"Stumble and Fall"	27	—	Razorlight
2004	"Golden Touch"	9	—	Razorlight
2004	"Vice"	18	—	Razorlight
2004	"Rip It Up"	20	—	Razorlight
2004	"If I Thought You'd Ever Change Your Mind"	11	—	Agnetha Fältskog
2004	"When You Walk In The Room"	34	—	Agnetha Fältskog
2004	"This Is The World We Live In"	15	—	Alcazar
2004	"We Are"	8	—	Ana Johnsson
2004	"Destiny"	92	—	The Attic
2004	"Felicidad" (featuring Isabel Fructuoso)	164	—	Axwell (as Mambana)
2004	"You Can't Hurry Love"	55	—	The Concretes
2004	"Seems Fine"	52	—	The Concretes
2004	"EP 1: Mr Jingles (2002 Re-Edit) / Chasing It / On The Strip"	109	—	Eric Prydz
2004	"Woz Not Woz" (with Steve Angello)	55	—	Eric Prydz
2004	"Call on Me"	1	—	Eric Prydz
2004	"Human Behaviour / Lesson One"	130	—	Eric Prydz
2004	"Spooks"	136	—	Eric Prydz
2004	"In & Out" (featuring Adeva)	112	—	Eric Prydz
2004	"Ding Dong Song" (with The Sunshine Girls)	14	—	Günther
2004	"Walk Idiot Walk"	13	—	The Hives
2004	"Two-Timing Touch and Broken Bones"	44	—	The Hives
2004	"Black Mask"	92	—	The (International) Noise Conspiracy
2004	"Heartbeats"	119	—	The Knife
2004	"Where Damage Isn't Already Done"	80	—	The Radio Dept.
2004	"Ewan"	87	—	The Radio Dept.
2004	"X-Ray Eyes"	164	—	Randy
2004	"Bigtime"	78	—	The Soundtrack of Our Lives
2004	"Tool Box EP: Yourself / Ware It Out / Funked"	162	—	Steve Angello
2004	"Put 'Em High" (featuring Therese)	6	—	StoneBridge
2004	"Paralyzed"	140	—	Mando Diao
2005	"You Can't Steal My Love"	73	—	Mando Diao
2005	"God Knows"	64	—	Mando Diao
2005	"Watch The Sunrise" (featuring Steve Edwards)	70	—	Axwell
2005	"Feel the Vibe" (featuring Tara McDonald)	16	—	Axwell
2005	"I Need Some Fine Wine and You, You Need to Be Nicer"	59	—	The Cardigans
2005	"Panda"	168	—	Dungen
2005	"A Little More for Little You"	113	—	The Hives
2005	"You Take My Breath Away" (featuring Jenny Wilson)	90	—	The Knife
2005	"Pass This On"	134	—	The Knife
2005	"Lady Stardust"	148	—	Lisa Miskovsky
2005	"Somewhere Else"	2	—	Razorlight
2005	"What Else Is There?" (featuring Karin Dreijer)	32	—	Röyksopp
2005	"Very Loud"	110	—	Shout Out Louds
2005	"The Comeback"	63	—	Shout Out Louds
2005	"Heading for a Breakdown"	70	—	The Soundtrack of Our Lives
2005	"Take Me Away" (featuring Therese)	9	—	StoneBridge
2005	"Freak On" (versus Ultra Naté)	37	—	StoneBridge
2005	"Axel F"	1	50	Crazy Frog
2005	"Popcorn"	12	—	Crazy Frog
2005	"Jingle Bells"	5	—	Crazy Frog
2006	"We Are The Champions (Ding A Dang Dong)"	11	—	Crazy Frog
2006	"Last Christmas"	16	—	Crazy Frog
2006	"Tell Me Why" (featuring Hal Ritson)	13	—	Axwell and Steve Angello (as Supermode)
2006	"Chosen One"	51	—	The Concretes
2006	"On the Radio"	85	—	The Concretes
2006	"Freejazz"	119	—	Envelopes
2006	"Kids with Guns" (featuring Neneh Cherry)	27	—	Gorillaz
2006	"Mambo!"	185	—	Helena Paparizou
2006	"We're from Barcelona"	158	—	I'm from Barcelona
2006	"Heartbeats"	9	—	José González
2006	"Crosses"	107	—	José González
2006	"Hand on Your Heart"	29	—	José González
2006	"We Share Our Mothers' Health"	85	—	The Knife
2006	"Like a Pen"	96	—	The Knife
2006	"Young Folks" (featuring Victoria Bergsman)	13	110	Peter Bjorn and John
2006	"Let's Call It Off"	130	—	Peter Bjorn and John
2006	"I Can't Get Enough" (featuring Alexandra Prince)	109	—	Sebastian Ingrosso and Steve Angello (as Fireflies)
2006	"Satellites"	96	—	September
2006	"Please Please Please"	53	—	Shout Out Louds
2006	"All This Love"	20	—	The Similou
2006	"Cobrastyle" (featuring Mad Cobra)	—	110	Teddybears
2006	"In the Morning"	3	—	Razorlight
2006	"America"	1	—	Razorlight
2006	"Before I Fall to Pieces"	17	—	Razorlight
2007	"I Can't Stop This Feeling I've Got"	44	—	Razorlight
2007	"Hold On"	80	—	Razorlight
2007	"The Worrying Kind"	121	—	The Ark
2007	"I Found U" (featuring Max'C)	6	—	Axwell
2007	"Counting Down the Days" (featuring Andrea Britton)	37	—	Axwell and Steve Angello (as Sunfreakz)
2007	"Now You're Gone" (ft DJ Mental Theo's Bazzheadz & Sebastian Westwood)	1	—	Basshunter
2007	"Proper Education" (versus Floyd)	2	—	Eric Prydz
2007	"Tick Tick Boom"	41	—	The Hives
2007	"Down the Line"	140	—	José González
2007	"Your Love Alone Is Not Enough" (featuring Nina Persson)	2	—	Manic Street Preachers
2007	"Release Me"	47	—	Oh Laura
2007	"Tony the Beat (Push It)"	143	—	The Sounds
2007	"Baby When the Light" (with David Guetta, featuring Cozi)	50	—	Steve Angello
2007	"Feelin' Me"	61	—	Therese
2007	"Evey Word" (featuring Awa Manneh)	163	—	Tyken (Carl Rydén and Fredrik "Dj Nibc" Nyberg)
2007	"With Every Heartbeat"	1	—	Robyn and Kleerup
2007	"Konichiwa Bitches"	98	—	Robyn
2007	"Handle Me"	17	—	Robyn
2008	"Be Mine!"	10	—	Robyn
2008	"Who's That Girl"	26	—	Robyn
2008	"Happy New Year"	171	—	ABBA
2008	"Slipping Through My Fingers"	164	—	ABBA
2008	"What A Wonderful World" (with Bob Sinclar, featuring Ron Carroll)	48	—	Axwell
2008	"Sunshine in the Rain"	69	—	BWO
2008	"Lay Your Love on Me"	69	—	BWO
2008	"I'm Not Over"	—	119	Carolina Liar
2008	"Show Me What I'm Looking For"	31	67	Carolina Liar
2008	"Dream On" (featuring Robyn and Ola Salo)	29	—	Christian Falk
2008	"Pjanoo"	2	—	Eric Prydz (as Pryda)
2008	"Still Alive"	96	—	Lisa Miskovsky
2008	"I'm Good, I'm Gone"	152	—	Lykke Li
2008	"Body Crash"	55	—	Sebastian Ingrosso and Steve Angello (as Buy Now!)
2008	"Cry for You"	5	74	September
2008	"All I Ever Wanted"	2	—	Basshunter
2008	"Angel in the Night"	14	—	Basshunter
2008	"I Miss You" (featuring Lauren Dyson)	32	—	Basshunter
2008	"Jingle Bells"	35	—	Basshunter
2009	"Walk on Water"	76	—	Basshunter
2009	"Every Morning"	17	—	Basshunter
2009	"I Promised Myself"	94	—	Basshunter
2009	"Always"	137	—	Aysel and Arash
2009	"Story of a Heart" (featuring Helen Sjöholm)	83	—	Benny Andersson Band
2009	"Hold On" (featuring Neverstore)	46	—	Lazee
2009	"Possibility"	133	120	Lykke Li
2009	"La voix"	138	—	Malena Ernman
2009	"Animal"	98	—	Miike Snow
2009	"Black & Blue"	64	—	Miike Snow
2009	"Nothing to Worry About"	139	—	Peter Bjorn and John
2009	"Can't Get Over"	14	—	September
2009	"Show Me Love" (with Laidback Luke, featuring Robin S., Hal Ritson and Yolanda Quartey)	11	—	Steve Angello
2009	"Everytime We Touch" (with David Guetta and Chris Willis)	68	—	Steve Angello and Sebastian Ingrosso
2009	"Sweet Child o' Mine"	23	—	Taken by Trees
2009	"Release Me"	3	—	Agnes
2009	"I Need You Now"	40	—	Agnes
2010	"On and On"	82	—	Agnes
2010	"Seek Bromance" (featuring Amanda Wilson)	13	—	Avicii (as Tim Berg)
2010	"My Feelings for You" (with Sebastien Drums, featuring Gwen McCrae)	46	—	Avicii
2010	"Nothing But Love" (featuring Errol Reid)	151	—	Axwell
2010	"Saturday"	21	—	Basshunter
2010	"Hurtful"	59	—	Erik Hassle
2010	"Twinkle Twinkle Little Star"	161	—	Fredrika Stahl
2010	"Silvia"	154	—	Miike Snow
2010	"Miss Me" (featuring Nelly)	66	—	Mohombi
2010	"Kick Ass (We Are Young)" (versus MIKA)	84	—	RedOne
2010	"One (Your Name)" (featuring Pharrell)	7	—	Swedish House Mafia
2010	"Miami 2 Ibiza" (versus Tinie Tempah)	4	—	Swedish House Mafia
2010	"Dancing On My Own"	8	113	Robyn
2010	"Hang with Me"	54	—	Robyn
2010	"Indestructible"	171	—	Robyn
2011	"Call Your Girlfriend"	55	—	Robyn
2011	"Fade into Darkness" (featuring Andreas Moe)	196	—	Avicii
2011	"Collide" (with Leona Lewis)	4	—	Avicii
2011	"Levels"	4	60	Avicii
2011	"Mind Your Manners" (featuring Icona Pop)	—	115	Chiddy Bang
2011	"Niton (The Reason)"	45	—	Eric Prydz
2011	"Popular"	76	—	Eric Saade
2011	"Ritual Union"	76	112	Little Dragon
2011	"All Over the World"	136	—	Ola
2011	"Open Your Eyes" (with Alex Metric, featuring Ian Brown)	89	—	Steve Angello
2011	"Save the World" (featuring John Martin)	10	105	Swedish House Mafia
2011	"Antidote" (versus Knife Party, featuring Adam Baptiste)	4	—	Swedish House Mafia
2012	"Greyhound"	13	—	Swedish House Mafia
2012	"Don't You Worry Child" (featuring John Martin)	1	6	Swedish House Mafia
2012	"Calling (Lose My Mind)" (featuring Ryan Tedder)	19	—	Alesso and Sebastian Ingrosso
2012	"Years" (featuring Matthew Koma)	109	—	Alesso
2012	"So Wonderful"	192	—	Emilia
2012	"Euphoria"	3	—	Loreen
2012	"Paddling Out"	90	—	Miike Snow
2012	"DJ, Ease My Mind"	103	—	Niki & The Dove
2012	"Million Voices"	14	—	Otto Knows
2012	"Lies" (Remix) (with BURNS)	32	—	Otto Knows
2012	"Silhouettes" (featuring Salem Al Fakir)	22	—	Avicii
2012	"Blessed" (featuring Shermanology)	164	—	Avicii
2012	"Superlove" (Remix) (versus Lenny Kravitz)	49	—	Avicii
2012	"Dancing in My Head" (Tom Hangs Remix) (versus Eric Turner)	188	—	Avicii
2013	"I Could Be the One" (with Nicky Romero, featuring Noonie Bao)	1	101	Avicii
2013	"X You"	47	—	Avicii
2013	"Wake Me Up!" (featuring Aloe Blacc)	1	4	Avicii
2013	"You Make Me"	5	85	Avicii
2013	"Hey Brother" (featuring Dan Tyminski)	2	16	Avicii
2013	"Lay Me Down" (featuring Adam Lambert)	200	—	Avicii
2013	"When You Really Loved Someone"	115	—	Agnetha Fältskog
2013	"I Should’ve Followed You Home" (with Gary Barlow)	99	—	Agnetha Fältskog
2013	"Center of the Universe" (featuring Magnus Carlson)	113	—	Axwell
2013	"Dust Clears" (featuring Noonie Bao)	43	—	Clean Bandit
2013	"You're Not Right for Me"	79	—	Emilia
2013	"I Love It" (featuring Charli XCX)	1	7	Icona Pop
2013	"All Night"	31	111	Icona Pop
2013	"Pumpin Blood"	—	119	NONONO
2013	"Jabba the Hutt" (with The Gregory Brothers)	103	—	PewDiePie
2013	"You"	72	—	Robin Stjernberg
2013	"Reload" (Vocal Version) (with Tommy Trash, featuring John Martin)	3	—	Sebastian Ingrosso
2013	"Children of the Sun" (featuring John Martin)	6	—	Tinie Tempah
2013	"If I Lose Myself" (versus OneRepublic)	8	—	Alesso
2013	"Under Control" (with Calvin Harris, featuring Hurts)	1	103	Alesso
2014	"Tear the Roof Up"	188	—	Alesso
2014	"Heroes (We Could Be)" (featuring Tove Lo)	6	31	Alesso
2014	"I Am" (with Sick Individuals, featuring Taylr Renee)	148	—	Axwell
2014	"Liberate"	71	—	Eric Prydz
2014	"My Silver Lining"	126	—	First Aid Kit
2014	"You" (featuring Vincent Pontare and Britney Spears)	—	119	Galantis
2014	"Anywhere for You"	7	—	John Martin
2014	"Gunshot"	126	—	Lykke Li
2014	"Don't Wait"	117	—	Mapei
2014	"Why Am I Crying"	197	—	Molly Sandén
2014	"Do It Again" (with Röyksopp)	75	—	Robyn
2014	"Undo"	40	—	Sanna Nielsen
2014	"Younger"	61	—	Seinabo Sey
2014	"I Need Your Love" (featuring Mohombi, Faydee and Costi)	—	66	Shaggy
2014	"Habits (Stay High)"	6	3	Tove Lo
2014	"Find You" (featuring Matthew Koma and Miriam Bryant)	—	101	Zedd
2014	"Divine Sorrow" (featuring Avicii)	174	—	Wyclef
2014	"Addicted to You" (featuring Audra Mae)	14	—	Avicii
2014	"The Days" (featuring Robbie Williams)	82	78	Avicii
2015	"The Nights" (featuring Nicholas Furlong)	6	109	Avicii
2015	"Waiting for Love" (featuring Simon Aldred)	6	110	Avicii
2015	"For a Better Day" (featuring Alex Ebert)	68	—	Avicii
2015	"Broken Arrows" (featuring Zac Brown)	178	—	Avicii
2015	"Cool" (featuring Roy English)	10	—	Alesso
2015	"Sweet Escape" (featuring Swedish-Spanish singer Sirena)	189	—	Alesso
2015	"I'm an Albatraoz" (featuring Little Sis Nora)	25	110	AronChupa
2015	"Something New" (featuring Salem Al Fakir)	22	117	Axwell Λ Ingrosso
2015	"On My Way"	100	—	Axwell Λ Ingrosso
2015	"Sun Is Shining"	56	—	Axwell Λ Ingrosso
2015	"Fun" (featuring Tove Lo)	164	—	Coldplay
2015	"Can't Stop Playing (Makes Me High)" (with Gregor Salto, featuring Ane Brun)	4	—	Dr. Kucho!
2015	"Tether" (versus CHVRCHΞS)	107	—	Eric Prydz
2015	"Heroes"	11	—	Måns Zelmerlöw
2015	"Next to Me" (featuring Simon Strömstedt)	103	—	Otto Knows
2015	"Set Me Free"	174	—	Robyn & La Bagatelle Magique
2015	"Crazy in Love"	55	—	Sofia Karlberg
2015	"Talking Body"	17	12	Tove Lo
2015	"Never Forget You" (with MNEK)	5	13	Zara Larsson
2015	"Runaway (U & I)" (featuring Julia Karlsson and Cathy Dennis)	4	114	Galantis
2015	"Peanut Butter Jelly" (featuring Martina Sorbara)	8	—	Galantis
2016	"No Money" (featuring Reece Bullimore)	4	88	Galantis
2016	"Love on Me" (with Hook n Sling, featuring Laura White)	16	—	Galantis
2016	"I Wanna Know" (featuring Nico & Vinz)	142	—	Alesso
2016	"Say It" (featuring Tove Lo)	69	60	Flume
2016	"If I Were Sorry"	61	—	Frans
2016	"The Ocean" (featuring SHY Martin)	39	110	Mike Perry
2016	"Sexual" (featuring Dyo)	5	—	NEIKED
2016	"Close" (featuring Tove Lo)	25	14	Nick Jonas
2016	"Cool Girl"	46	84	Tove Lo
2016	"Desire" (Remix) (featuring Tove Lo)	27	—	Years & Years
2016	"Girls Like" (featuring Zara Larsson)	5	—	Tinie Tempah
2016	"This One's for You" (featuring Zara Larsson)	16	—	David Guetta
2016	"Lush Life"	3	75	Zara Larsson
2016	"Ain't My Fault"	13	76	Zara Larsson
2016	"I Would Like"	2	—	Zara Larsson
2017	"So Good" (featuring Ty Dolla $ign)	44	—	Zara Larsson
2017	"Symphony" (featuring Zara Larsson)	1	101	Clean Bandit
2017	"All Falls Down" (featuring Noah Cyrus, Digital Farm Animals & Juliander)	87	—	Alan Walker
2017	"Falling"	72	—	Alesso
2017	"Let Me Go" (with Hailee Steinfeld, feat. Florida Georgia Line & Watt)	30	40	Alesso
2017	"Without You" (featuring Sandro Cavazza)	32	114	Avicii
2017	"Lonely Together" (featuring Rita Ora)	4	118	Avicii
2017	"I Love You" (featuring Kid Ink)	72	—	Axwell Λ Ingrosso
2017	"More Than You Know" (featuring Kristoffer "Bonn" Fogelmark)	30	—	Axwell Λ Ingrosso
2017	"Rich Boy" (featuring Chiara Hunter and Ava Rifat)	60	—	Galantis
2017	"My Lover" (with Not3s)	14	—	Mabel
2017	"Finders Keepers" (featuring Kojo Funds)	8	—	Mabel
2017	"Call Me" (featuring MIMI)	55	—	NEIKED
2018	"I Wanna Know" (featuring Bea Miller)	46	123	NOTD
2018	"Missing U"	87	—	Robyn
2018	"Ruin My Life"	9	76	Zara Larsson
2018	"Fine Line" (featuring Not3s)	11	—	Mabel
2018	"Cigarette" (with RAYE and Stefflon Don)	41	—	Mabel
2018	"Ring Ring" (with Jax Jones, featuring Rich The Kid)	12	—	Mabel
2018	"One Shot"	44	—	Mabel
2019	"Don't Call Me Up"	3	66	Mabel
2019	"Mad Love"	8	—	Mabel
2019	"Bad Behaviour"	94	—	Mabel
2019	"God Is a Dancer" (with Tiësto)	15	—	Mabel
2019	"SOS" (featuring Aloe Blacc)	6	68	Avicii
2019	"Tough Love" (featuring Agnes and Vargas & Lagola)	60	—	Avicii
2019	"Heaven" (featuring Chris Martin)	20	83	Avicii
2019	"Hope" (featuring Winona Oak)	89	124	The Chainsmokers
2019	"Late Night Feelings" (featuring Lykke Li)	30	—	Mark Ronson
2019	"Now You're Gone" (featuring Zara Larsson)	79	—	Tom Walker
2019	"Jacques" (with Jax Jones)	67	—	Tove Lo
2019	"We Got That Cool" (featuring Afrojack and Icona Pop)	68	—	Yves V
2019	"Don't Worry Bout Me"	34	—	Zara Larsson
2019	"All the Time"	58	—	Zara Larsson
2020	"Like It Is" (with Kygo and Tyga)	49	113	Zara Larsson
2020	"Breaking Me" (with Topic)	3	53	A7S
2020	"Dancing in the Moonlight" (featuring Ellen "NEIMY" Falkås)	11	—	Jubël
2020	"Husavik" (with Will Ferrell)	59	—	Molly Sandén (as My Marianne)
2020	"Double Trouble" (with Will Ferrell)	76	—	Molly Sandén (as My Marianne)
2020	"Some Say"	89	—	Nea
2020	"I Want You Around"	—	123	Snoh Aalegra
2020	"Boyfriend"	10	—	Mabel
2020	"West Ten" (with AJ Tracey)	5	—	Mabel
2020	"Tick Tock" (with Clean Bandit, featuring 24kGoldn)	8	—	Mabel
2021	"Let Them Know"	19	—	Mabel
2021	"Time After Time"	71	—	Mabel
2021	"I Wish" (featuring Mabel)	17	—	Joel Corry
2021	"Your Love (9PM)" (with AJ Tracey and Topic)	8	—	A7S
2021	"Don't Shut Me Down"	9	—	ABBA
2021	"I Still Have Faith in You"	14	—	ABBA
2021	"Just a Notion"	59	—	ABBA
2021	"When You Danced With Me"	67	—	ABBA
2021	"Little Things"	61	—	ABBA
2021	"When I'm Gone" (with Katy Perry)	49	90	Alesso
2021	"Heartbreak Anthem" (with David Guetta and Little Mix)	3	—	Galantis
2021	"Sweet Talker" (with Years & Years)	26	—	Galantis
2021	"Hear Me Say" (with Jonas Blue)	65	—	Léon
2021	"Better Days" (with Mae Muller and Polo G)	32	23	NEIKED
2021	"Moth to a Flame" (with The Weeknd)	15	27	Swedish House Mafia
2022	"Words" (featuring Zara Larsson)	36	—	Alesso
2022	"Everything But You" (featuring A7S)	55	—	Clean Bandit
2022	"Run" (with Becky Hill)	21	—	Galantis
2022	"Mary on a Cross"	28	90	Ghost
2022	"Con La Brisa" (with Foudeqush)	73	—	Ludwig Göransson
2022	"Good Luck" (with Jax Jones and Galantis)	45	—	Mabel
2022	"Overthinking" (featuring 24kGoldn)	88	—	Mabel
2022	"Deal or No Deal" (with A1 x J1)	98	—	Mabel
2022	"I Just Called" (with Anne-Marie and Latto)	99	—	NEIKED
2022	"Heaven Takes You Home" (with Connie Constance)	80	—	Swedish House Mafia
2022	"Turn On the Lights again.." (with Fred Again featuring Future)	27	—	Swedish House Mafia
2023	"Can't Tame Her"	25	—	Zara Larsson
2023	"Tattoo"	2	—	Loreen
2023	"On My Love"	15	—	Zara Larsson & David Guetta
2024	"Lighter"	78	—	Galantis
2024	"My Oh My"	63	—	Kylie Minogue & Bebe Rexha & Tove Lo

== See also ==
- List of best-selling Swedish music artists
- Nordic popular music
