= Good Thing =

Good Thing(s), The Good Thing(s) or A Good Thing may refer to:

== Albums ==
=== Good Thing ===
- Good Thing (Leon Bridges album), 2018
- Good Thing (Rebecka Törnqvist album) or the title song (see below), 1995
- A Good Thing (album), by Allen Mezquida, or the title song, 1996

=== Good Things ===
- Good Things (Aloe Blacc album) or the title song, 2010
- Good Things (Dan + Shay album) or the title song (see below), 2021
- Good Things (Looptroop Rockers album), 2008
- Good Things, by Toni Lynn Washington, 2000
- The Good Things, by Jill Phillips, 2008

== Songs ==
=== Good Thing ===
- "Good Thing" (Eternal song), 1995
- "Good Thing" (Fine Young Cannibals song), 1989
- "Good Thing" (I-dle song), 2025
- "Good Thing" (Paul Revere & The Raiders song), 1966
- "Good Thing" (Rebecka Törnqvist song), 1995
- "Good Thing" (Sage the Gemini song), 2015
- "Good Thing" (Zedd and Kehlani song), 2019
- "Good Thing", by Aṣa from Lucid, 2019
- "Good Thing", by IOYOU, a predecessor of Westlife, 1998
- "Good Thing", by Jake Miller, 2016
- "Good Thing", by the Jesus Lizard from Head, 1990
- "Good Thing", by Jolin Tsai from Magic, 2003
- "Good Thing", by Kip Moore from Slowheart, 2017
- "Good Thing", by Lynyrd Skynyrd from Lynyrd Skynyrd 1991, 1991
- "Good Thing", by Reel Big Fish from Cheer Up!, 2002
- "Good Thing", by Rosie Ribbons
- "Good Thing", by Sam Smith from In the Lonely Hour, 2014
- "Good Thing", by Taeyeon from Why, 2016
- "Good Thing", by the Woodentops from Giant, 1986
- "A Good Thing", by Charles Mann, 1966
- "A Good Thing", by Saint Etienne from Tales from Turnpike House, 2005
- "A Good Thing", by the Sneetches, 1993
- "The Good Thing", by Talking Heads from More Songs About Buildings and Food, 1978

=== Good Things ===
- Good Things (Dan + Shay song), 2021
- Good Things (Rival Schools song), 2002
- "Good Things", by BoDeans from Black and White, 1991
- "Good Things", by A Day to Remember from Common Courtesy, 2013
- "Good Things", by Grand Funk Railroad from Born to Die, 1976
- "Good Things", by Rich Boy from Rich Boy, 2007
- "Good Things", by Sascha Schmitz from Open Water, 2006
- "Good Things", by Zebrahead from MFZB, 2003
- "The Good Things", by Cherry Poppin' Daddies from Susquehanna, 2008

== Other uses ==
- Good Things (music festival), an annual music festival in Australia
- The Good Things (film), a 2001 American short
- Good Things, a 1971 cookbook by Jane Grigson
- Good Things (book), a 2025 cookbook by Samin Nosrat

== See also ==
- All Good Things (disambiguation)
- Good Thang (disambiguation)
