= What You Want =

What You Want may refer to:

== Songs ==
- "What You Want" (Evanescence song), 2011
- "What You Want" (Jay Sean song), 2017
- "What You Want" (Mase song), 1998
- "What You Want" (Belly song), 2018, featuring The Weeknd
- "What You Want (Baby I Want You)", by The Music Explosion in 1968
- "What You Want", by My Bloody Valentine from their 1991 album Loveless
- "What You Want", by Richard Marx from his 1994 album Paid Vacation
- "What You Want", by Nuno Bettencourt from his 1997 album Schizophonic
- "What You Want", by The Wannadies from their 1997 album The Wannadies
- "What You Want", from the musical Legally Blonde
- "What You Want", by Mandy Moore from her 1999 album So Real
- "What You Want", by The Roots from their 1999 live album The Roots Come Alive
- "What You Want", by DMX, the alternate radio title of his 2000 single What These Bitches Want
- "What You Want", by LL Cool J from his 2006 album Todd Smith
- "What You Want", by Tenth Avenue North from their 2016 album Followers
- "WHAT YOU WANT!", 2023 song by asteria featuring vocals from Hatsune Miku; has a remix with 6arelyhuman and kets4eki; also has a cover by Vyzer

== Other ==
- What You Want (EP), a 2004 EP by the John Butler Trio
- "What You Want" (Danny Phantom), an episode of the television series Danny Phantom

== See also ==
- "What Ya Want", song by Eve
- Whatcha Want, album by Michael Monroe
- "So What'cha Want", single by Beastie Boys
