= The Wannadies (1997 album) =

Studio album by The Wannadies
- Released: 28 October 1997 (US)
- Recorded: 1994–1996
- Genre: Alternative rock
- Length: 48:30
- Label: RCA
- Producers: Nille Perned, Per Sunding, Kjell Nästén

The Wannadies chronology
Bagsy Me (1997)	The Wannadies (1997)	Skellefteå (1998)

Professional ratings
Review scores
Source	Rating
Allmusic	3/5 stars

The Wannadies is an album by Swedish band The Wannadies. It was released in 1997 as their first album for the US market, seven years after their debut in Sweden. It is based on the band's fourth album Bagsy Me, also released in 1997. As well as slightly changing the order, it omits two tracks ("Bumble Bee Boy" and "Combat Honey") replacing them with two further singles from the band's third album Be A Girl ("Might Be Stars" and "How Does It Feel?" - "You and Me Song" was also originally from Be A Girl but was also included on Bagsy Me).

== Track listing ==
All tracks are written by Wiksten, S. Schönfeldt, F. Schönfeldt, Karlsson, Bergmark.

No.	Title	Length
1.	"Might Be Stars"	3:20
2.	"Because"	2:17
3.	"Friends"	2:55
4.	"You And Me Song"	2:51
5.	"Someone Somewhere"	4:49
6.	"Damn It I Said"	3:13
7.	"How Does It Feel?"	4:23
8.	"Oh Yes (It's A Mess)"	4:20
9.	"Shorty"	3:30
10.	"Silent People"	3:12
11.	"What You Want"	2:44
12.	"Hit"	2:22
13.	"That's All"	8:38
