= Pride of Africa =

Pride of Africa may refer to:

- Pride of Africa (train)
- Pride of Africa (song)
