= The Wannadies (1990 album) =

Studio album by The Wannadies
- Released: August 1990
- Recorded: November 1989
- Studio: MNW Studio, Vaxholm, Sweden
- Genre: Alternative rock
- Length: 37:24
- Label: MNW Records
- Producer: Ingemar Karlsson

The Wannadies chronology
Smile EP (1989)	The Wannadies (1990)	Aquanautic (1992)

Singles from The Wannadies
- 1. "My Home Town" Released: 1990; 2. "Heaven" Released: 1990

The Wannadies is the début album by the Swedish alternative rock band The Wannadies. It was released in 1990 and reached number twenty-six on the Swedish Albums Chart. The Wannadies includes the singles "My Home Town", "Heaven" and a new recording of the lead song from their début release Smile EP; "The Beast Cures the Lover".

Receiving positive reviews the album was originally released as an LP and CD in August 1990. The album was re-released in 1993 on Snap Records with a pair of covers originally performed by T. Rex and The Go-Betweens respectively as bonus tracks. The artwork was designed by Hank with photography by Patrick Degerman.

== Track listing ==
All tracks are written by Wiksten, S. Schönfeldt, F. Schönfeldt, Karlsson, Bergmark, Malmquist unless otherwise stated.

Side one
No.	Title	Length
1.	"Together"	2:59
2.	"Heaven"	3:16
3.	"My Home Town"	3:23
4.	"Things that You Love"	4:35
5.	"How Beautiful Is the Moon"	3:46

Side two
No.	Title	Length
6.	"Innocent Me"	2:56
7.	"So Many Lies"	3:06
8.	"Smile"	3:08
9.	"Anything"	3:19
10.	"Black Waters"	3:09
11.	"The Beast Cures the Lover"	3:41

1993 re-release CD bonus tracks
No.	Title	Writer(s)	Length
12.	"Children of the Revolution"	Marc Bolan	3:17
13.	"Lee Remick"	McLennan, Forster	2:54

== Personnel ==
The Wannadies are

- Pär Wiksten: Vocals
- Stefan Schönfeldt
- Fredrik Schönfeldt
- Gunnar Karlsson
- Christina Bergmark
- Björn Segnestam

Additional musicians, technical and visual

- Ingemar Karlsson - Additional Guitar
- Curt-Åke, Nils - Percussion
- Ingemar Karlsson - Producer
- Johan Nilsson, The Wannadies - Producer ("Lee Remick")
- Curt-Åke Stefan, Nils Löfstedt - Recording
- Anders Lind, Michael Ilbert - Mixing
- Hank - Sleeve
- Patrick Degerman - Photography
