= Good Thang =

Good Thang may refer to:

- "Good Thang" (song), a 1999 song by Robyn
- Good Thang (album), a 1978 album by Faze-O

== See also ==
- Good Thing (disambiguation)
