= Pride (Yaki-Da album) =

Studio album by Yaki-Da
- Released: 1995
- Genre: Pop
- Label: Edel-Mega Records MRCD 3268
- Producer: Jonas Berggren, John Ballard, Zal, Radiant

Yaki-Da chronology
Pride (1995)	A Small Step for Love (1998)

Pride is the first studio album of Swedish group Yaki-Da. The album was released in 1995. The lead single, "I Saw You Dancing" reached number 54 on the Billboard Hot 100 and number 11 on the Billboard Dance Charts. The album was successful in Europe, reaching number two in Norway and the top 40 in Sweden.

== Track listing ==
All lyrics and music by Jonas "Joker" Berggren, except where noted.

1. "Just a Dream" – 3:20
2. "I Saw You Dancing" – 3:49
3. "Pride of Africa" – 3:37
4. "Show Me Love" – 3:29
5. "Teaser on the Catwalk" (Lyrics: Berggren, Marie Knutsten; Music: Berggren) – 3:37
6. "Another Better World" – 3:46
7. "Mejor Mañana" (Lyrics: Berggren, John Ballard, Linda Schoenberg; Music: Berggren) – 3:25
8. "Deep in the Jungle" (Lyrics and music: Knutsen, Berggren) – 4:13
9. "Now I Want Love" (Lyrics and music: Knutsen) – 4:04
10. "Pride of Africa" (Remix) – 4:36
11. "Show Me Love" (Acoustic Version) – 3:26
12. "Rescue Me Tonight" (Lyrics: Knutsen, Ballard; Music: Knutsen) – 4:13

== Singles ==
1. "I Saw You Dancing"
2. "Show Me Love"
3. "Pride of Africa"
4. "Deep in the Jungle"

== Credits ==
- Artwork – René Hedemyr
- Photography – Michael Johansson
- Producer – Jonas "Joker" Berggren (tracks: 1 to 8, 10, 11)

== Charts ==
Chart (1995)	Peak position
Norwegian Albums (VG-lista)	2
Swedish Albums (Sverigetopplistan)	37
