= Show Me Love (Yaki-Da song) =

Single by Yaki-Da

from the album Pride
- Released: 1994
- Recorded: 1994
- Genre: Europop; ballad
- Length: 3:28
- Label: Mega; Metronome 851 108-2
- Songwriter: Jonas Berggren
- Producer: Jonas Berggren

Yaki-Da singles chronology
"Show Me Love" (1994)	"I Saw You Dancing" (1994)

Music video
- "Show Me Love" on YouTube

"Show Me Love" is a song by the Swedish duo Yaki-Da, released in 1994 by Mega Records and Metronome as the first single from their first album, Pride (1995). It was written by Jonas Berggren from Ace of Base, who also produced it, and became a top-20 hit in both Denmark and Norway, peaking at numbers 15 and 16. The accompanying music video features Marie Knutsen and Linda Schönberg of Yaki-Da performing in an old mansion. The song was later re-recorded by Berggren's own band, Ace of Base, for its 2002 album Da Capo.

== Track listing ==
- CD single, Europe (1994)
1. "Show Me Love" (Radio Edit) – 3:28
2. "Show Me Love" (Acoustic Version) – 3:27

== Credits ==
- Written by Jonas "Joker" Berggren
- Vocals: Linda Schonberg and Marie Knutsen
- Produced by Joker
- Recorded and mixed by John Ballard & Joker

== Charts ==
Chart (1994)	Peak position
Denmark (IFPI)	15
Norway (VG-lista)	16
