= A Night Like This (album) =

1993 studio album by Rebecka Törnqvist

Studio album by Rebecka Törnqvist
- Released: 1993
- Genre: Pop/Jazz
- Length: 56:05
- Label: EMI

Rebecka Törnqvist chronology
A Night Like This (1993)	Good Thing (1995)

Professional ratings
Review scores
Source	Rating
AllMusic	4/5 stars

A Night Like This is the first album by Rebecka Törnqvist, released in 1993.

== Tracks ==
1. "Mary, Mary" (Pål Svenre) (4:49)
2. "Madrid" (4:11)
3. "Easy Come, Easy Go" (Pål Svenre) (Radio Mix) (4:30)
4. "Everywhere" (Pål Svenre) (4:09)
5. "Nothing Ever" (Pål Svenre) (4:50)
6. "Here's That Rainy Day" (Jimmy Van Heusen, Johnny Burke) (5:50)
7. "Molly Says" (Pål Svenre) (3:43)
8. "Wander Where You Wander" (Pål Svenre) (4:36)
9. "Angel Eyes" (Matt Dennis, Earl Brent) (5:54)
10. "Do You Mind" (feat. Joe Williams) (4:26)
11. "One Hour Drive" (Pål Svenre) (2:32)
12. "I'll Wait" (Pål Svenre) (6:25)

== Charts ==
Chart (1993–94)	Peak position
Sweden (Sverigetopplistan)	4
