= Aquanautic =

Studio album by The Wannadies
- Released: October 1992
- Recorded: MNW Studios & Conference Room
- Genre: Alternative rock
- Length: 43:04
- Label: Snap Records
- Producer: Michael Ilbert

The Wannadies chronology
The Wannadies (1990)	Aquanautic (1992)	Be a Girl (1994)

Singles from Aquanautic
- 1. "Things That I Would Love To Have Undone" Released: 1992; 2. "So Happy Now" Released: 1992; 3. "Cherry Man" Released: 1993

Aquanautic is the second album by the Swedish alternative rock band The Wannadies. It was released in 1992 and reached number thirty-nine on the Swedish Albums Chart. Aquanautic includes the singles "Things That I Would Love To Have Undone", "So Happy Now" and the EP; "Cherry Man". Receiving positive reviews the album was originally released as a CD in October 1992. The artwork was designed by Freq Form with photography by Peter Gehrke, Ake E:son Lindman and Lena Granefelt.

== Reception ==
Professional ratings
Review scores
Source	Rating
Allmusic	4.5/5 stars

Aquanautic received positive reviews from the majority of critics. Jason Damas writing for Allmusic heaps praise on the album describing it as "much louder and guitar-oriented" and displaying a "very major leap in songwriting from the first album". Damas concludes remarking that Aquanautic "marked the beginning of the band's climb to success outside of Sweden, and it is also the disc where they found their signature sound".

== Track listing ==
All tracks are written by S. Schönfeldt, F. Schönfeldt, Karlsson, Bergmark, Malmquist

No.	Title	Length
1.	"Everything's True"	3:46
2.	"Cherry Man"	4:41
3.	"Things That I Would Love to Have Undone"	4:38
4.	"Love Is Dead"	3:24
5.	"So Happy Now"	2:41
6.	"Lucky You"	3:13
7.	"1.07"	1:07
8.	"December Days"	5:40
9.	"Something to Tell"	3:43
10.	"Suddenly I Missed Her"	2:52
11.	"God Knows"	2:22
12.	"Never Killed Anyone"	2:17
13.	"I Love You Love Me"	2:33

== Personnel ==
The Wannadies are

- Pär Wiksten
- Stefan Schönfeldt
- Fredrik Schönfeldt
- Gunnar Karlsson
- Christina Bergmark
- Björn Segnestam-Malmqvist

Additional musicians, technical and visual

- Michael Ilbert – Maracas ("Everything's True), Tambourine ("December Days"), Percussion ("Something To Tell")
- Metal Mike – Maracas and Tambourine ("Cherry Man"), Percussion ("So Happy Now")
- Michael Ilbert – Producer, Recorded By
- Michael Ilbert, Peter Mark – Mixing
- The Wannadies – Music, Lyrics
- Freq Form – Artwork
- Peter Gehrke – Photography [Group]
- Ake E:son Lindman – Photography [Pages 3&6]
- Lena Granefelt – Photography [Pages 5&9]
- Bisse – Photography Assistant
