= Skellefteå (album) =

Compilation album by the Wannadies
- Released: 1998
- Genre: Alternative rock
- Length: 53:59
- Label: Soap Records
- Producers: Nille Perned, Micke Herrström, Michael Ilbert, The Wannadies, Johan Nilsson, Dag Lundqvist, Ingemar Karlsson, Kjell Nästén

The Wannadies chronology
The Wannadies (1997)	Skellefteå (1998)	Yeah (1999)

Professional ratings
Review scores
Source	Rating
Allmusic	4.5/5 stars

Skellefteå is an album by Swedish band the Wannadies, named after the band's home town Skellefteå in northern Sweden.

A compilation of the best of their releases for MNW Records/Soap, the album also features the previously unreleased track, "Easier to Sing", and was released in 1998.

== Track listing ==
All tracks are written by Wiksten, S. Schönfeldt, F. Schönfeldt, Karlsson, Bergmark, Malmquist.

No.	Title	Length
1.	"Easier To Sing"	4:04
2.	"Might Be Stars" (Single Version)	3:09
3.	"You And Me Song"	2:50
4.	"Love In June"	3:02
5.	"How Does It Feel?"	4:22
6.	"New World Record"	3:03
7.	"Kid"	4:48

All tracks are written by Wiksten, S. Schönfeldt, F. Schönfeldt, Karlsson, Bergmark.

No.	Title	Length
8.	"Cherry Man"	4:41
9.	"December Days"	5:41
10.	"Lucky You"	3:18
11.	"Love Is Dead" (From Hell To Skellefteå Version)	2:36
12.	"Never Killed Anyone" (Version #1)	2:05
13.	"My Home Town"	3:33
14.	"Black Waters"	3:12
15.	"The Beast Cures The Lover" (Smile EP Version)	3:27
