= Before & After (The Wannadies album) =

Studio album by The Wannadies
- Released: 2002
- Genre: Alternative rock
- Length: 36:43
- Label: National Records
- Producers: Nille Perned, The Wannadies

The Wannadies chronology
Yeah (1999)	Before & After (2002)

Professional ratings
Review scores
Source	Rating
Allmusic	3/5 stars
Pitchfork Media	(6.3/10)

Before & After is an album by Swedish band The Wannadies. Originally released in Scandinavia in 2002 on two compact discs comprising the 'before' and 'after' parts, the album was released on 8 September 2003 in the UK on a single disc with an enhanced multimedia section featuring videos for the singles "Skin", "Disko" and "Little By Little".

== Track listing ==
All tracks are written by Wiksten, S. Schönfeldt, F. Schönfeldt, Karlsson, Dahlgren.

Before
No.	Title	Length
1.	"Little By Little"	2:44
2.	"Nothing Wrong"	3:06
3.	"Piss On You"	2:32
4.	"Skin"	3:09
5.	"Uri Geller"	2:50
6.	"All Over Me"	3:10

After
No.	Title	Length
1.	"Disko"	3:03
2.	"Singalong Son"	3:32
3.	"Come With Me (Till Things Get Better)"	2:57
4.	"Happy"	3:43
5.	"Can't Stop You"	3:01
6.	"Love Letter"	2:56
