= Good Thing (Rebecka Törnqvist song) =

Single by Rebecka Törnqvist

from the album Good Thing
- A-side: "Good Thing"
- B-side: "Good Thing" (guitar mix)
- Released: 1995
- Genre: jazz pop
- Label: EMI
- Songwriter(s): Pål Svenre, Rebecka Törnqvist

"Good Thing" is a song written by Pål Svenre and Rebecka Törnqvist, and recorded by Törnqvist for her 1995 album of the same name. The song was also released as a single and appeared on the Absolute Music 20 compilation.

The song peaked at No. 13 on the Swedish singles chart. It also charted at Trackslistan, entering after the summer break, on 26 August 1995 ending up at 19th position. One week later, however, the song was off the chart.

== Charts ==
Chart (1995)	Peak position
Sweden (Sverigetopplistan)	13
United Kingdom (UK Singles Chart)	87
