= All Good Things =

All Good Things may refer to:

== Music ==
- All Good Things (band), an American musical group

=== Albums ===
- All Good Things (album), a 2002 album by Sissel
- All Good Things: Jerry Garcia Studio Sessions, a box set by Jerry Garcia
- All Good Things, an album by Pacha Massive

=== Songs ===
- "All Good Things (Come to an End)", a 2006 song by Nelly Furtado
- "All Good Things", a song by Mandy Moore from Wild Hope (2007)
  - Also recorded by co-writers The Weepies, from Hideaway (2008)

== Theatre ==
- All Good Things, a 2004 stage musical based on the story of the American rock band the Remains

== Television and film ==
- All Good Things (film), a 2010 film starring Ryan Gosling and Kirsten Dunst
- All Good Things (TV series), a 1991 BBC TV programme
- "All Good Things..." (Dawson's Creek), a 2003 television episode
- "All Good Things..." (The Hills), a 2010 television episode
- "All Good Things..." (Star Trek: The Next Generation), a 1994 television episode
- All Good Things, a 2018 film starring Morgan Fairchild
