= The Wannadies =

Swedish alternative rock band

- Origin: Skellefteå, Sweden
- Genres: Alternative rock, power pop
- Years active: 1988–2009, 2016, 2020–present
- Labels: Cooking Vinyl, RCA, Indolent, BMG, MNW, Snap, National, Hot Stuff
- Members: Pär Wiksten; Christina Bergmark; Stefan Schönfeldt; Fredrik Schönfeldt; Erik Dahlgren
- Past members: Gunnar Karlsson; Björn Malmqvist

The Wannadies is a Swedish alternative rock band formed in 1988 in Skellefteå. The band's initial line-up featured Pär Wiksten (lead vocals, guitar), Christina Bergmark (backing vocals, melodica, keyboards), Micke Herrström (keyboards), brothers Stefan (guitar) and Fredrik Schönfeldt (bass), Gunnar Karlsson (drums) and Björn Malmquist (violin). They are best known for their 1994 single "You and Me Song", which peaked at number 18 on the UK Singles Chart in 1996 due to its use in the film Romeo + Juliet. The band were originally active between 1988 and 2009, briefly reuniting in 2016 and again in earnest circa 2020.

== History ==
=== Early days (1988–1993) ===
The Wannadies played their first concert, a festival in support of the Nicaraguan Sandinistas, in October 1988 and only weeks later entered local studio KN to record the three tracks that would become their debut release—the Smile EP.

Smile was released in February 1989 and managed to pick up several 'single of the week' accolades from national newspapers as well as airplay on indie radio shows such as 'Bommen' despite little or no marketing. Following the band's appearance at the Hultsfred Festival in August 1989, The Wannadies signed a recording contract with MNW Records, releasing their debut single, "My Hometown", in May the following year.

The band's eponymous debut album was released in August 1990, and was supported by tours of Sweden, Finland and Norway. A highlight for the group was 1991s Nordic music festival in Paris where they shared the bill with Finland's 22 Pistepirkko and Iceland's The Sugarcubes.

Second album, Aquanautic was released in October 1992 on Snap Records, MNW's indie label. Not without controversy the album saw videos for the singles "Things That I Would Love to Have Undone" and "Cherry Man" banned by MTV, the former for featuring a foam animal cadaver, the latter for the allusions to paedophilia in both the song's lyrics and video which featured a middle-aged man surrounded by young girls and boys.

In the summer of 1993 Björn Malmquist moved to Stockholm and left the band (he did make a contribution to The Wannadies next album however, playing violin on the track "Dreamy Wednesdays").

=== Be a Girl and UK success (1993–1996) ===
Initial recording sessions for third album, Be a Girl, proved unsuccessful—first choice producer Dagge Lunquist took paternity leave late in 1993 and a second attempt with producer Micke Herrström had to be abandoned after just a week and a half when, first engineer Adam Kviman, then Herrström were taken sick with hearing injuries.

"Love in June", the only song to be completed with Micke Herrström, was released as a single while the band tried again to record Be a Girl, this time with producer Nille Perned. The album was finally finished by late 1994 and was released along with second single, "You and Me Song", to critical acclaim in their native country. Shortly afterwards the band came to the attention of Indolent Records in the United Kingdom who signed The Wannadies in the summer of 1995. The group's first British gig followed soon after, a sold-out show at the Dublin Castle, Camden in the autumn of the same year.

Throughout winter the band toured extensively with labelmates Sleeper and The 60 ft Dolls as well as with Lightning Seeds and Frank Black. At the same time they were regularly commuting to studios in Gothenburg, Skellefteå and Stockholm to record tracks for their next album, again with producer Nille Perned.

Further singles "Might Be Stars" and "How Does It Feel?" were taken from Be a Girl but it was not until the re-release of "You and Me Song" in April 1996 that the band really made an impact in the United Kingdom, where the song peaked at number eighteen on the UK Singles Chart. The track later appeared on the official soundtrack to Baz Luhrmann's 1996 Romeo + Juliet, further increasing their popularity.

=== Troubled times (1997–1999) ===
Problems with Swedish record company MNW led to delays with the release of the group's fourth album, Bagsy Me (a translation of the Swedish children's expression 'Pax jag!'), which was eventually released in January 1997 on Sony/BMG Records. The album included the hit singles "Someone Somewhere", "Friends", "Hit" (which made No. 20 in the UK Singles Chart) and "Shorty". "You and Me Song" was also included to capitalise on The Wannadies post-Romeo + Juliet success. A revised version of the album (with two more singles from Be a Girl replacing two album tracks) was later released in America under the title The Wannadies.

The next few years were a turbulent time for the group. In Spring 1997 drummer and founding member Gunnar Karlsson left, to be replaced by Erik Dahlgren (born 25 August 1965), a long-term friend of the band.

After sorting out problems with their Swedish record label The Wannadies now felt they were suffering from a lack of support from BMG in the UK and went on strike. A compilation album of the best of their first three albums featuring tracks chosen by the band and entitled, appropriately, Skellefteå, was released in Scandinavia in the spring of 1998 with the band touring the region in support while their problems with BMG were being resolved.

Relations with the label had sufficiently improved for the band to begin recording their next album in the autumn of 1998 with a ten-day session at the Chateau De La Rouge Motte studio in Normandy, France with producer Mike Hedges.

Only one track, "String Song", was completed however and it was not until the winter of 1998/99 that the band recorded the bulk of the tracks for fifth album Yeah. With former Cars frontman Ric Ocasek at the helm The Wannadies began recording at Electric Lady recording studios in New York City and continued work at studios in Stockholm and London.

Yeah was released in the autumn of 1999 in Scandinavia and early spring 2000 in the UK. BMG decided not to release the record in America however, refused permission for the band to release it on another label and eventually dropped the band altogether.

=== Before & After and break-up ===
Despite not having a record company The Wannadies toured extensively throughout the summer of 2000, played the Glastonbury and Carling festivals in the UK, Roskilde in Denmark, Hultsfred and Arvika in Sweden and completed a mini-tour of Japan.

The latter half of 2000 and much of 2001 saw the band construct their own recording studio in which they would record much of their sixth album.

With Nille Perned again producing, the band released Before & After in 2002 in Scandinavia through the National record label and on 8 September 2003 in the UK on Cooking Vinyl records (who also handled distribution for the rest of the world). The album featured the singles "Skin", "Disko" and "Little by Little".

In 2003, "You and Me Song" was used in the climax to an episode of the long-running British soap opera Coronation Street in which Richard Hillman drives his new wife, Gail Platt and her family into a canal (in which he dies); and later, in 2007, an episode in which his stepson, David Platt, drives his car into that same canal as a suicide attempt, only to survive, ruining his sister Sarah's wedding day.

In 2006 "You and Me Song" was used as the theme song to the BBC Three TV series I'm with Stupid.

The band were thought to be writing and recording songs for their seventh album while simultaneously preparing to release the twenty-track compilation Girlfriend (Love Stories A-E) in 2008; however, in April 2009, they announced they had split, with Wiksten pursuing a solo career.

The band reunited in 2016 for two festival dates across late August and early September in Sweden.

=== New music and reformation announced (2020) ===
In 2020, it was announced that Before & After would be released on vinyl for the first time. A previously-unreleased song entitled "Can't Kill The Musikk" was shared simultaneously, which was originally written for the album but not completed until 2020. The single was released on September 3, 2020, with a live version of "My Home Town" as the B-side. Later that year, the band announced that they would be reforming to perform live dates. Three dates in Sweden in March 2021 were announced, with a new press shot of the band. In January 2024, the band released their first new material in over 20 years, a stand-alone single entitled "It's You (It's You It's You It's You)".

== Discography ==
The Wannadies discography
- Studio albums: 6
- Extended plays: 3
- Compilation albums: 3
- Singles: 18

=== Studio albums ===
| Year | Title | Chart positions | |
| Year | Title | SWE | UK |
|---|---|---|---|
| 1990 | The Wannadies: Released: August 1990; Labels: MNW | 26 | – |
| 1992 | Aquanautic: Released: October 1992; Labels: Snap | 39 | – |
| 1994 | Be a Girl: Released: November 1994; Labels: Snap, Indolent | 34 | – |
| 1997 | Bagsy Me: Released: January 1997; Labels: Snap, BMG, Indolent | 7 | 37 |
| 1999 | Yeah: Released: October 1999; Labels: RCA, BMG | 13 | 73 |
| 2002 | Before & After: Released: May 2002; Labels: National, Cooking Vinyl, Hot Stuff | 30 | – |

=== Compilation albums ===
| Year | Title | Chart positions | |
| Year | Title | SWE | UK |
|---|---|---|---|
| 1997 | The Wannadies: Released: October 1997; Labels: RCA | N/A | N/A |
| 1998 | Skellefteå: Released: March 1998; Labels: Soap Records | 31 | – |
| 2008 | Girlfriend (Love Stories A-E): Released: 2008; Labels: Independent Music | – | – |

=== Extended plays ===
- Smile (1989, A West Side Fabrication)
- Cherry Man (1993, Snap Records)
- You and Me Song EP (1996, Nippon Columbia)

=== Singles ===
| Year | Title | Chart positions | | Certifications | Album |
| Year | Title | SWE | UK | Certifications | Album |
|---|---|---|---|---|---|
| 1990 | "My Home Town" | – | – | | The Wannadies |
| 1990 | "Heaven" | – | – | | The Wannadies |
| 1992 | "Things That I Would Love to Have Undone" | – | — | | Aquanautic |
| 1992 | "So Happy Now" | – | – | | Aquanautic |
| 1993 | "Cherry Man" | – | – | | Aquanautic |
| 1994 | "Love in June" | 38 | – | | Be a Girl |
| 1994 | "You and Me Song" | – | 93 | | Be a Girl |
| 1995 | "Might Be Stars" | – | 51 | | Be a Girl |
| 1995 | "How Does It Feel?" | – | 53 | | Be a Girl |
| 1996 | "You and Me Song" (Re-issue) | – | 18 | BPI: Gold | Be a Girl |
| 1996 | "Someone Somewhere" | – | 38 | | Bagsy Me |
| 1996 | "Friends" | – | – | | Bagsy Me |
| 1997 | "Hit" | – | 20 | | Bagsy Me |
| 1997 | "Shorty" | – | 41 | | Bagsy Me |
| 1999 | "Yeah" | – | 56 | | Yeah |
| 2000 | "Don't Like You (What the Hell Are We Supposed to Do)" | – | – | | Yeah |
| 2000 | "Big Fan" | – | – | | Yeah |
| 2002 | "Skin" | – | 101 | | Before & After |
| 2002 | "Little by Little" | – | – | | Before & After |
| 2003 | "Disko" | – | 131 | | Before & After |
| 2020 | "Can't Kill the Musikk” | — | — | | Non-album singles |
| 2024 | "It's You (It's You It's You It's You)” | — | — | | Non-album singles |
