= Yeah (The Wannadies album) =

Studio album by The Wannadies
- Released: 1999
- Genre: Alternative rock
- Length: 50:08
- Label: RCA, BMG
- Producer: Ric Ocasek, Mike Hedges

The Wannadies chronology
Skellefteå (1998)	Yeah (1999)	Before & After (2002)

Professional ratings
Review scores
Source	Rating
AllMusic	4.5/5 stars

Yeah is an album by Swedish band The Wannadies, released in 1999 in Scandinavia and spring 2000 in the UK.

== Track listing ==
All tracks are written by Wiksten, S. Schönfeldt, F. Schönfeldt, Karlsson, Dahlgren

No.	Title	Length
1.	"I Love Myself"	3:06
2.	"Yeah"	3:08
3.	"No Holiday"	3:11
4.	"Big Fan"	3:47
5.	"Don't Like You (What the Hell Are We Supposed To Do)"	3:50
6.	"String Song"	4:39
7.	"Can't See Me Now"	3:53
8.	"Kill You"	2:52
9.	"(You)"	3:55
10.	"Low Enough"	3:22
11.	"Idiot Boy"	3:54
12.	"Friend or Foe"	5:00
13.	"Ball"	2:52
14.	"...Have Another One"	2:51
