= Yaki-Da =

Swedish pop group

- Origin: Gothenburg, Sweden
- Genres: Pop
- Years active: 1994–2000
- Past members: Marie Knutsen; Linda Schönberg

Yaki-Da were a Swedish pop group consisting of singers Marie Knutsen and Linda Schönberg. They were put together by Ace of Base band member and producer Jonas "Joker" Berggren. Berggren produced their entire first album and wrote all but two of the songs appearing on it.

They released their first album, Pride, in 1995 and the album's lead single, "I Saw You Dancing", reached number 54 on the Billboard Hot 100 and number 11 on the Billboard Dance Charts. They were somewhat more successful in Europe, Latin America and Asia.

Their second album, A Small Step For Love, was released in 1998. It featured no collaborations with Jonas Berggren. The album spawned one single, entitled "I Believe". The song and album saw a very limited release in Europe and Korea. A music video, shot inside of a Korean airport (but featuring Chinese characters), was released for "I Believe".

One of the songs Jonas Berggren wrote and produced for Pride, "Show Me Love", was re-recorded by Berggren's own band, Ace of Base, for their 2002 album, Da Capo.

== Discography ==
=== Albums ===
- 1995 Pride (SE #37, NO #2)
- 1998 A Small Step for Love

=== Singles ===
Year	Single	Peak chart positions					Album
Year	Single	SE	NO	US	US Dance	Canada Dance	Album
1994	"Show Me Love"	―	16	―	―	―	Pride
1994	"I Saw You Dancing"	32	7	54	11	10	Pride
1995	"Pride of Africa"	―	―	―	―	19	Pride
1995	"Deep in the Jungle"	―	―	―	―	―	Pride
1998	"I Believe"	―	―	―	―	―	A Small Step for Love
