= Bagsy Me =

Studio album by The Wannadies
- Released: January 1997 (Sweden); May 1997 (UK)
- Genre: Alternative rock
- Length: 49:29
- Labels: Indolent, RCA, BMG, Snap
- Producers: Nille Perned, Per Sunding, Kjell Nästén

The Wannadies chronology
Be A Girl (1994)	Bagsy Me (1997)	The Wannadies (1997)

Singles from Bagsy Me
- 1. "Someone Somewhere" Released: 5 August 1996; 2. "Friends" Released: 14 October 1996; 3. "Hit" Released: 14 April 1997; 4. "Shorty" Released: 23 June 1997; 5. "You and Me Song" Released: 27 October 1997

Professional ratings
Review scores
Source	Rating
Allmusic	4.5/5 stars
NME	7/10

Bagsy Me is the fourth album by Swedish band The Wannadies, released in 1997.

It includes the hit singles "Someone Somewhere", "Shorty", "Friends", "Hit" and "You and Me Song", the last being originally available on previous album Be A Girl. The song was not re-recorded and is present to capitalise on the band's growing fame following the track's appearance on the soundtrack to Baz Luhrmann's 1996 film Romeo + Juliet. The album was released in revised form in the US as The Wannadies.

The CD version also features a pre-gap 'hidden track', which is the album versions of "Silent People" and "Bumble Bee Boy" played at the same time (both tracks feature on this album normally, as tracks 7 and 10) . Silent People is panned to the left, with Bumble Bee Boy panned to the right and starting 4 seconds later. The two songs feature the same music and some similar lyrics, but due to their differing tempos, they only sync up for a single line (the first 'how about you', in the first chorus of both songs).

== Track listing ==
All tracks are written by Wiksten, S. Schönfeldt, F. Schönfeldt, Karlsson, Bergmark.

No.	Title	Length
1.	"Because"	2:17
2.	"Friends"	2:55
3.	"Someone Somewhere"	4:49
4.	"Oh Yes (It's A Mess)"	4:20
5.	"Shorty"	3:30
6.	"Damn It I Said"	3:13
7.	"Silent People"	3:12
8.	"What You Want"	2:44
9.	"Hit"	2:22
10.	"Bumble Bee Boy"	2:56
11.	"Combat Honey"	2:26
12.	"You and Me Song"	2:50
13.	"That's All"	8:38

== Personnel ==
- Christina Bergmark: Vocals
- Björn Segnestam: Keyboards
- Gunnar Karlsson: Drums
- Nille Perned: Recorder, Producer
- Fredrik Schonfeldt: Bass
- Stefan Schönfeldt: Guitar-Vocals
- Per Sunding: Producer
- Pär Wiksten: Guitar-Vocals
