= I Saw You Dancing =

Single by Yaki-Da

from the album Pride
- Released: 1994
- Recorded: 1994
- Studio: Tuff Studios
- Genre: Eurodance; Europop
- Length: 3:41
- Label: Mega Records; Metronome 851 108-2
- Songwriter: Jonas Berggren
- Producer: Jonas Berggren

Yaki-Da singles chronology
"Show Me Love" (1994)	"I Saw You Dancing" (1994)	"Pride of Africa" (1995)

Music video
- "I Saw You Dancing" on YouTube

"I Saw You Dancing" is a song by Swedish group Yaki-Da. It was released in 1994 by Mega Records and Metronome, as the lead single from their first studio album, Pride (1995). The song is written and produced by Jonas Berggren from Ace of Base and was a top-10 hit in Denmark, Finland, Greece, Iceland, Israel, Malaysia, Norway and on the Canadian RPM Dance/Urban chart. In the US, it reached numbers 54 and 41 on the Billboard Hot 100 and the Cash Box Top 100 Pop Singles chart.

== Critical reception ==
The song received favorable reviews from most music critics. John Bush from AllMusic said the group "pursue the same bubblegum dance-pop route" as Ace of Base on the song. Larry Flick from Billboard magazine named it "a sunny li'l confection". He wrote that the "chirpy Swedish female duo makes an excellent first impression with a bright and shuffling pop confection that proudly wears the fingerprints of mentor Jonas Berggren from Ace of Base. The track wins with a simple but memorable melody that blossoms into a swirling, thickly harmonious chorus..."

Dave Sholin from the Gavin Report said, "It's easy to get hooked on this plaintive melody line. One hundred percent pure pop is exactly what one would expect from Ace of Base's Jonas "Joker" Berggren, who produced this song. It's easy to hear that mission has been accomplished." Pan-European magazine Music & Media noted, "Bookers, here's the one to put all your money on. Penned by Ace Of Base's Joker, it is in the famed pop reggae mould with a touch of ABBA and other past Eurovision winners." Chuck Campbell from Scripps Howard News Service noted it as a "very ABBA-like single". James Hunter from Vibe described it as "latinesque pop disco".

== Chart performance ==
"I Saw You Dancing" was a success on the charts in several continents and remains the group's most successful hit. It was a top-10 hit in Denmark (7), Greece, Iceland (6), Israel, Malaysia, and Norway (7). In Greece, it hit number-one on the Radio Star FM and peaked at number five on the Pop + Rock singles chart. In Yaki-Da's homecountry Sweden, the song reached number 32 on Sverigetopplistan on 3 February 1995, with seven weeks within the chart. On the Eurochart Hot 100, it reached number 97, after charting in Denmark, Norway and Sweden. In the US, "I Saw You Dancing" peaked at number 54 on the Billboard Hot 100, number 11 on the Billboard Hot Dance Club Play chart and number 41 on the Cash Box Top 100 Pop Singles chart in a difficult period for contemporary pop music in the US. Few radio stations played the song, with WSPK-FM "K104.7" in Poughkeepsie, N.Y., a notable champion of the song. In Canada, it climbed to number 10 on the RPM Dance/Urban chart and number 62 on the RPM Top Singles chart. In West Asia, "I Saw You Dancing" peaked at number three in Israel in its second week on the chart, on 6 December 1994.

== Music video ==
Right at the beginning of the music video, a male dancer walks along the beach. He finds a medallion with the letter "y" engraved on it. As the music starts, two women, Linda and Marie, in black dresses are walking ashore by a lighthouse. On the beach, a group of circus artists and musicians are having a party. The dancer is there, dancing with the medallion on his chest. Other scenes show the two women singing at the top of the lighthouse. Sometimes they are also standing out in the water, wearing glittery dresses. The man with the medallion are seen going into the tent of a fortune teller. He puts the medallion on the table to her and she traces him with tarot cards. Then she looks at him with an astonished mine. Linda and Marie stays the night, standing in the dark, illuminated only by the fire from the beach party. They watch the party and the people there from a distance. As it dawns, the women return to the sea. The male dancer stands and watches them walk into the sea. They look back at him, as he hesitantly steps forward. The video was made available on Mega Records official YouTube channel in 2011. As of July 2025, it has generated more than 61 million views on the platform.

== Covers ==
In 1995, Roberts Gobziņš made a nonsensical phonetical cover titled "Man saujā benzīns".

== Track listing ==
- 12" single, Scandinavia (1994)
1. "I Saw You Dancing" (Tribal Radiocut) — 4:39
2. "I Saw You Dancing" (House Radiocut) — 5:09
3. "I Saw You Dancing" (Tribal Anthem) — 9:11
4. "I Saw You Dancing" (Radio) — 3:41
- 12" single, US (1995)
1. "I Saw You Dancing" (Lenny B's Classic House Mix) — 7:31
2. "I Saw You Dancing" (Lenny B's Classic House Mix Instrumental) — 7:31
3. "I Saw You Dancing" (Armand's Serial Killa Mix) — 8:43
4. "I Saw You Dancing" (Lenny B's Classic Edit) — 4:08
- CD single, Scandinavia (1994)
1. "I Saw You Dancing" (Radio) — 3:41
2. "I Saw You Dancing" (Extended) — 4:49
- CD single, US (1995)
1. "I Saw You Dancing" (Album Version) — 3:44
2. "I Saw You Dancing" (Lenny B's Classic Edit) — 4:08
3. "I Saw You Dancing" (Armand's Serial Killa Mix) — 8:43
4. "I Saw You Dancing" (Lenny B's Classic House Mix) — 7:31
5. "I Saw You Dancing" (Original Mix) — 3:41
6. "Rescue Me Tonight" (Album Version) — 4:12
- CD maxi, Japan (1995)
1. "I Saw You Dancing" (Radio) — 3:41
2. "I Saw You Dancing" (Extended) — 4:49
3. "I Saw You Dancing" (East Mix) — 3:41
4. "I Saw You Dancing" (Tribal Radiocut) — 4:39
5. "I Saw You Dancing" (House Radiocut) — 5:09

== Credits ==
- Written-By – Jonas "Joker" Berggren
- Vocals – Linda Schonberg & Marie Knutsen
- Recorded and Mixed-By – John Ballard & Joker in Tuff Studios, Gothenburg
- Guitars – Kenneth Svensson
- Choir – John B

℗ 1994 Metronome Musik GmbH © 1994 Mega Records

== Charts ==
=== Weekly charts ===
Chart (1995)	Peak position
Canada Top Singles (RPM)	62
Canada Dance/Urban (RPM)	10
Denmark (Tracklisten)	7
Europe (Eurochart Hot 100)	97
Finland (Suomen virallinen lista)	12
Germany (GfK)	65
Greece (Pop + Rock)	5
Greece Airplay (Radio Star FM)	1
Iceland (Íslenski Listinn Topp 40)	6
Israel (Israeli Singles Chart)	3
Norway (VG-lista)	7
Quebec (ADISQ)	2
Sweden (Sverigetopplistan)	32
US Billboard Hot 100	54
US Dance Club Songs (Billboard)	11
US Maxi-Singles Sales (Billboard)	49
US Cash Box Top 100	41

=== Year-end charts ===
Chart (1995)	Position
Norway (VG-lista) (Winter Period)	15
