= Pride of Africa (song) =

Single by Yaki-Da

from the album Pride
- Released: 1995
- Recorded: 1994
- Studio: Tuff Studios
- Genre: Eurodance; Europop; reggae fusion
- Length: 3:34
- Label: Mega Records; Metronome
- Songwriter: Jonas Berggren

Yaki-Da singles chronology
"I Saw You Dancing" (1995)	"Pride of Africa" (1995)	"Deep in the Jungle" (1995)

Music video
- "Pride of Africa" on YouTube

"Pride of Africa" is a song by Swedish duo Yaki-Da, released via Metronome label as the third single from their debut album, Pride (1995). It is written by Jonas Berggren from Ace of Base and is a Europop song with elements from Eurodance and reggae fusion music. In Canada, it peaked at number 19 on the RPM Dance/Urban chart. The accompanying music video, directed by Nigel Burgess Jones, features the duo on a train through Africa and also performing the song with local people watching them.

== Track listing ==
1. "Pride of Africa" (Radio) – 3:34
2. "Pride of Africa" (Radiant Remix) – 4:33
3. "Pride of Africa" (Rapino Brothers Latin Version) – 7:20
4. "Pride of Africa" (Rapino Brothers Mental Mix) – 5:51

== Charts ==
Chart (1995)	Peak position
Canada Dance/Urban (RPM)	19
Quebec (ADISQ)	30

== Credits ==
- Written by Jonas "Joker" Berggren
- Vocals – Linda Schonberg & Marie Knutsen
- Choir by L. Schonberg, M. Knutsen, B. Stenström, J. Ballard, J. Berggren
