= SoundFactory =

Swedish dance music group

- Also known as: Sound Factory
- Origin: Sweden
- Genres: Eurodance; house
- Occupations: DJ; remixer; producer
- Years active: 1992–1995
- Label: RCA
- Past members: Emil Hellman; James Gicho (as St. James)

SoundFactory (sometimes credited as Sound Factory) is a Swedish dance music act comprising DJ Emil Hellman with James Gicho (credited as St. James) on vocals on some recordings. Formed in 1992, the act was known for its number-one dance single "Good Time" mixed with StoneBridge. By 1994, Hellman and Gicho had collaborated on an album, Product, before they separated ways. Hellman continued with SoundFactory as a solo act.

== History ==
They had three entries on the US Billboard Hot Dance Music/Club Play chart in the mid-1990s: "Understand This Groove" in 1992, "2 the Rhythm" in 1993 and "Good Time" in 1994, the latter of which hit number-one and was their most successful single.

The original version of "Understand This Groove" was by UFI feat Franke Pharoah - "Understand This Groove" on Virgin Records UK 1990. The Sound Factory version which came out in 1992 is more like a remix of the original and prompted Franke to remix, and re-release, his original track on China Records UK.

The track could not be used on SoundFactory's debut album Product. It was re-recorded as "Get On The Floor" as the replacement track. It was explained on the CD's liner notes that it was for legal reasons and added "Sorry Franke" which gave you a hint as to why "Understand This Groove" was excluded in the first place.

== See also ==
- List of number-one dance hits (United States)
- List of artists who reached number one on the US Dance chart
