= Absent Minded (Swedish rapper) =

Swedish musician and rapper

Absent Minded is the name for Swedish rapper Adam Baptiste, also known as ADL's solo hip hop music when paired with producer Vladi C. Both the Absent Minded project and ADL are considered pioneers of hip-hop and urban music in Sweden, and the 1996 Absent Minded album Extreme Paranoia in Stocktown is considered a classic of the era.

Prior to Absent Minded, ADL had already had success as frontman for the band Stonefunkers, one of the earliest urban-style Swedish groups. The band toured Europe while signed to Warner Music Group. ADL left the band in 1996 to become a solo rapper.

As Absent Minded, with producer Vladi C, the group released three singles and one full-length album, Extreme Paranoia in Stocktown, through record labels Polydor, Breakin' Bread, and Sonet. The single Alright gained international attention when used in a Hugo Boss ad campaign, and Absent Minded toured through Europe with Fugees in 1996.
