= Rebecka Törnqvist =

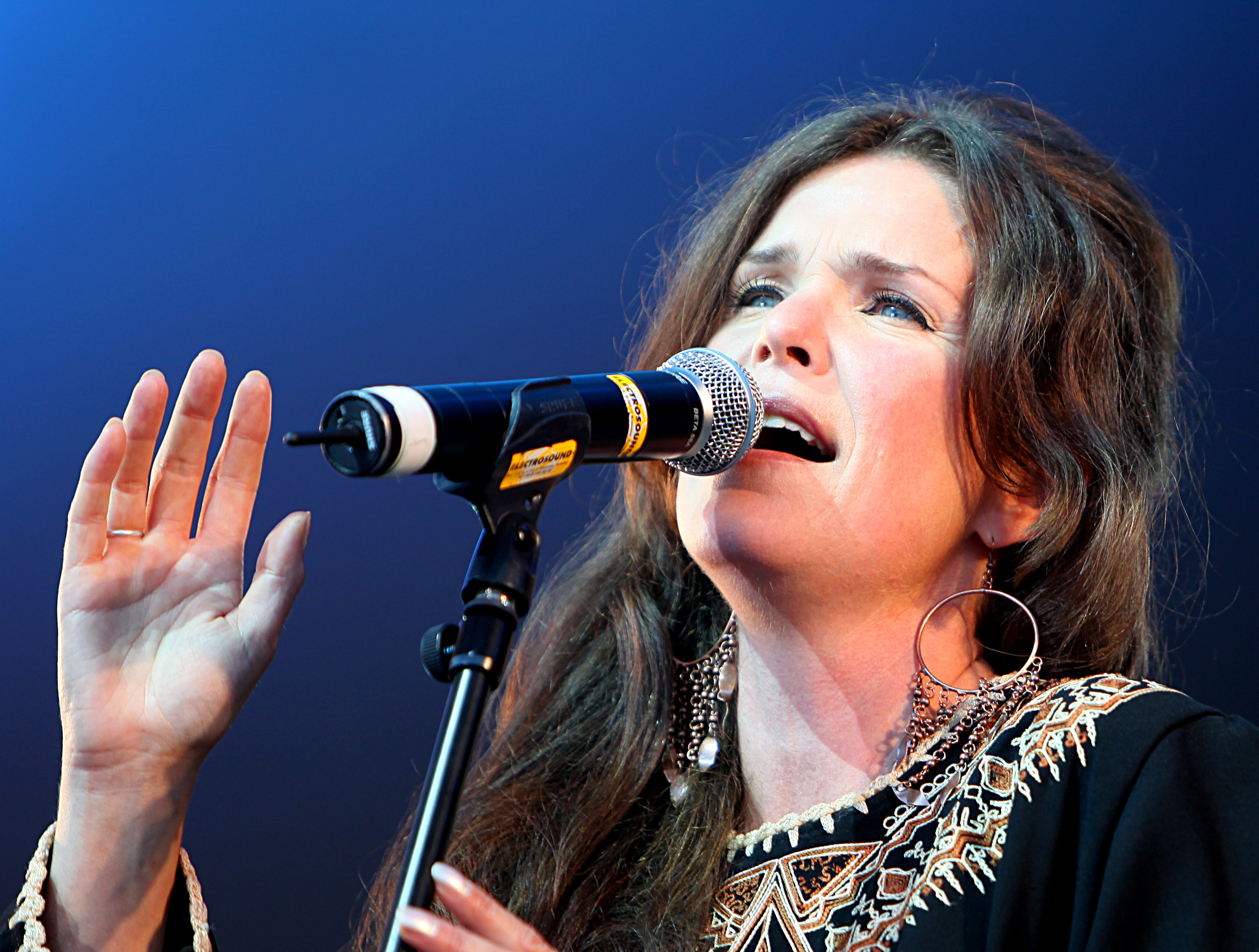
- Törnqvist in Stockholm, July 2009

Background information
- Origin: Uppsala, Sweden
- Genres: Jazz, pop
- Years active: 1993–present
- Labels: EMI, Warner, Kaza, Metronome

Rebecka Törnqvist (born 26 April 1964 in Uppsala, Sweden) is a Swedish jazz and pop vocalist.

Her debut album A Night like This was released in 1993 and sold over 100,000 copies. This was followed by Good Thing in 1995.

Most of the albums by Rebecka Törnqvist are sung in English, with the exception of Vad jag vill (2001). She helped to increase "interest in young female jazz vocalists in Sweden in the 1990s, though her solo albums weren't pure jazz, but rather pop with heavy jazz influences".

== Discography ==
Year	Album details	Peak chart positions
Year	Album details	SWE
1993	A Night Like This: Release date: 1993; Label: EMI	4
1995	Good Thing: Release date: 1995; Label: EMI	1
1996	The Stockholm Kaza Session (with Per 'Texas' Johansson): Release date: 1996; Label: EMI	12
1998	Tremble My Heart: Release date: 1998; Label: EMI	5
2001	Vad Jag Vill (Swedish for What I Want): Release date: 2001; Label: WMS	21
2004	Travel Like in Songs: Release date: 2004; Label: EMI	10
2006	Melting into Orange: Release date: 2006; Label: EMI	14
2006	Fire in the Hole: Sara Isaksson & Rebecka Törnqvist Sing Steely Dan (with Sara Isaksson): Release date: 2006; Label: UNI	22
2008	The Cherry Blossom and the Skyline Rising from the Street: Release date: 2008; Label: EMI	31
2011	Scorpions: Release date: 2011; Label: WMS	25
2017	Home Secretary: Release date: 2017; Label: BOR	55
"—" denotes releases that did not chart

=== With the band Gloria ===
Year	Album details	Peak chart positions
Year	Album details	SWE
1999	Gloria: Release date: 1999; Label: WMS	13
2003	People Like You and Me: Release date: 2003; Label: WMS	26
"—" denotes releases that did not chart
