= Good Thing (Rebecka Törnqvist album) =

1995 Rebecka Törnqvist studio album

Studio album by Rebecka Törnqvist
- Released: 1995
- Recorded: Atlantis & EMI Studios, Stockholm, Sweden
- Genre: pop, jazz
- Length: 49:08
- Label: EMI
- Producer: Pål Svenre, Alar Suurna, Rebecka Törnqvist

Rebecka Törnqvist chronology
A Night Like This (1993)	Good Thing (1995)	The Stockholm Kaza Session (1996)

Good Thing is a 1995 album by Rebecka Törnqvist.

== Track listing ==
All song written by Rebecka Törnqvist and Pål Svenre except as noted.

1. "Good Thing" – 3:45
2. "Just as Long" – 4:39
3. "Sleep Tight" – 3:25
4. "Julio's Rainbow" (Rebecka Törnqvist, Esbjörn Svensson) – 4:37
5. "You and Your Great Love" – 4:09
6. "Forever More" – 4:35
7. "I Do" (Rebecka Törnqvist) – 4:31
8. "Monster Walk" – 5:10
9. "Love Song" – 3:04
10. "Larger Than Life" (Rebecka Törnqvist, Pål Svenre, Markus Wikström) – 5:34
11. "I Don't Know Why" (Shawn Colvin) – 5:28

== Charts ==
Chart (1995)	Peak position
Sweden (Sverigetopplistan)	1
