= Be a Girl =

Studio album by The Wannadies
- Released: October 1994
- Recorded: Music A Matic and MNW Studio
- Genre: Alternative rock
- Length: 38:51
- Label: Snap, Indolent
- Producer: Nille Perned, Micke Herrström

The Wannadies chronology
Aquanautic (1992)	Be a Girl (1994)	Bagsy Me (1997)

Singles from Be a Girl
- 1. "Love in June" Released: May 1994; 2. "You and Me Song" Released: November 1994; 3. "Might Be Stars" Released: October 1995; 4. "How Does it Feel?" Released: February 1996

Be a Girl is the third album by Swedish alternative rock band The Wannadies. It was released in October 1994 and reached number thirty-four on the Swedish Albums Chart. The entire album was produced by Nille Perned with the exception of the first single "Love in June" which was produced by Micke Herrström. The album was supported by the Swedish National Council for Cultural Affairs

Be a Girl includes the singles "Love in June", "You and Me Song", "Might Be Stars" and "How Does it Feel?". Receiving positive reviews the album was originally released as a CD and LP in Sweden and released wider in 1995. The artwork was designed by Lars Sundh with photography by Irmelie Krekin.

The album was released by the RCA subsidiary Indolent Records in the UK on 28 August 1995. The album received a major boost when the single "You and Me Song" was featured on the soundtrack to Baz Luhrmann's 1996 film, Romeo + Juliet. The hit song was subsequently re-released in 1996 and reached #18 on the UK Singles Chart and was also included on international editions of the group's following album Bagsy Me.

== Reception ==
Professional ratings
Review scores
Source	Rating
Allmusic	4.5/5 stars

Be a Girl received positive reviews from the majority of critics. Jason Damas writing for Allmusic calls the album "classic Britpop from beginning to end -- a life-affirming album that reminds us why rock & roll is so great". Damas notes that musically the group has developed from their previous release remarking that "The guitars are noticeably louder on this disc, and the pace barely relents before "Kid," a gut-wrenching power-ballad".

== Track listing ==
All tracks are written by Wiksten, S. Schönfeldt, F. Schönfeldt, Karlsson, Bergmark.

No.	Title	Length
1.	"You and Me Song"	2:51
2.	"Might Be Stars"	3:20
3.	"Love in June"	3:02
4.	"How Does it Feel?"	4:23
5.	"Sweet Nymphet"	3:14
6.	"New World Record"	3:03
7.	"Dying for More"	4:52
8.	"Soon You're Dead"	1:59
9.	"Do it All the Time"	2:51
10.	"Dreamy Wednesdays"	4:25
11.	"Kid"	4:45

== Personnel ==
The Wannadies are

- Pär Wiksten: Guitar-Vocals
- Fredrik Schönfeldt: Bass
- Stefan Schönfeldt: Guitar-Vocals
- Gunnar Karlsson: Drums
- Christina Bergmark: Vocals
- Björn Segnestam: Violin
- Micke Herrström: Keyboards

Additional musicians, technical and visual

- Nille Perned - Additional Guitar, Programming, Ambient Sounds
- Kent Norberg - Guest Vocals ("Do it All the Time")
- Lars Frykholm, Svein H. Martinsen, Tony Bauer - Strings ("Dreamy Wednesdays")
- Nille Perned - Producer (all tracks except "Love in June")
- Micke Herrström - Producer ("Love in June")
- David Möllerstedt and Nille Perned - Recording (all tracks except "Love in June")
- Adam Kviman, Micke Herrström, Thomas Petersson - Recording ("Love in June")
- Nille Perned - Mixing (all tracks except "Love in June")
- Stefan Glaumann - Mixing ("Love in June")
- Peter Dahl - Mastering
- Irmelie Krekin - Cover Photography
- Steve "Mr Butter" Double - Group Photography
- Lars Sundh - Design
- T+CP - Design Translation
