= You and Me Song =

1994 single by the Wannadies

Single by the Wannadies

from the album Be a Girl
- B-side: "Blister in the Sun"
- Released: November 1994
- Genre: Power pop; Britpop
- Length: 2:45
- Label: Soap; Indolent
- Songwriters: Wiksten, S. Schönfeldt, F. Schönfeldt, Karlsson, Bergmark.
- Producer: Nille Perned

The Wannadies singles chronology
"Love in June" (1994)	"You and Me Song" (1994)	"Might Be Stars" (1994)

"You and Me Song" is a song by Swedish band the Wannadies. Originally released as a single in November 1994, it became the group's biggest hit. In April 1996, it peaked at number 18 in the United Kingdom.

== Song information ==
Appearing on the band's third album, Be a Girl, the song was also included on their next album, Bagsy Me, due to the success of the re-released single and the song's appearance on the soundtrack of Baz Luhrmann's film Romeo + Juliet. For the second UK single release, the song's title acquired an ampersand. The B-side, "Blister in the Sun", is a cover of a song by the Violent Femmes.

== In the media ==
In a 2003 episode of the British soap opera Coronation Street, the song was used to soundtrack a scene during which Richard Hillman drove his wife Gail Platt, two of her children David and Sarah and granddaughter Bethany into a canal, which resulted in Hillman's death.

== Track listings ==
Original Swedish release (1994)

1. "You and Me Song"
2. "Let Go Oh Oh"

First UK release (1995)

- 7-inch (DIE001)
1. "You and Me Song"
2. "Blister in the Sun"
- CD (DIE001CD)
1. "You and Me Song"
2. "Blister in the Sun"
3. "Lift Me Up (Don't Let Me Down)"

Second UK release (1996)

- 7-inch (DIE005 – limited blue vinyl)
1. "You & Me Song"
2. "Blister in the Sun"
3. "Everybody Loves Me"
- CD (DIE005CD)
1. "You & Me Song"
2. "Everybody Loves Me"
3. "I Like You a Lalalala Lot"
4. "You & Me Song" (lounge version)

Third UK release (1997)

- 7-inch (DIE011 – limited to 3,000 copies)
1. "You & Me Song"
2. "Just Can't Get Enough"

10th anniversary release (2004)

- 7-inch (DIE011 – limited to 3,000 copies)
1. "You & Me Song (feat. Richard Hillman)"
2. "I'm Not In Love"

== Certifications ==
Region	Certification	Certified units/sales
United Kingdom (BPI)	Gold	400,000^{‡}
^{‡} Sales+streaming figures based on certification alone.

== Release history ==
Region	Date	Format(s)	Label(s)	Ref.
Sweden	November 1994	CD	Soap	
United Kingdom	31 July 1995	7-inch vinyl; CD; cassette	Indolent	
United Kingdom	8 April 1996	CD; cassette	Indolent	
United Kingdom	27 October 1997	CD	Indolent	
United States	26 January 1998	Modern rock radio	RCA	
