= Razorlight discography =

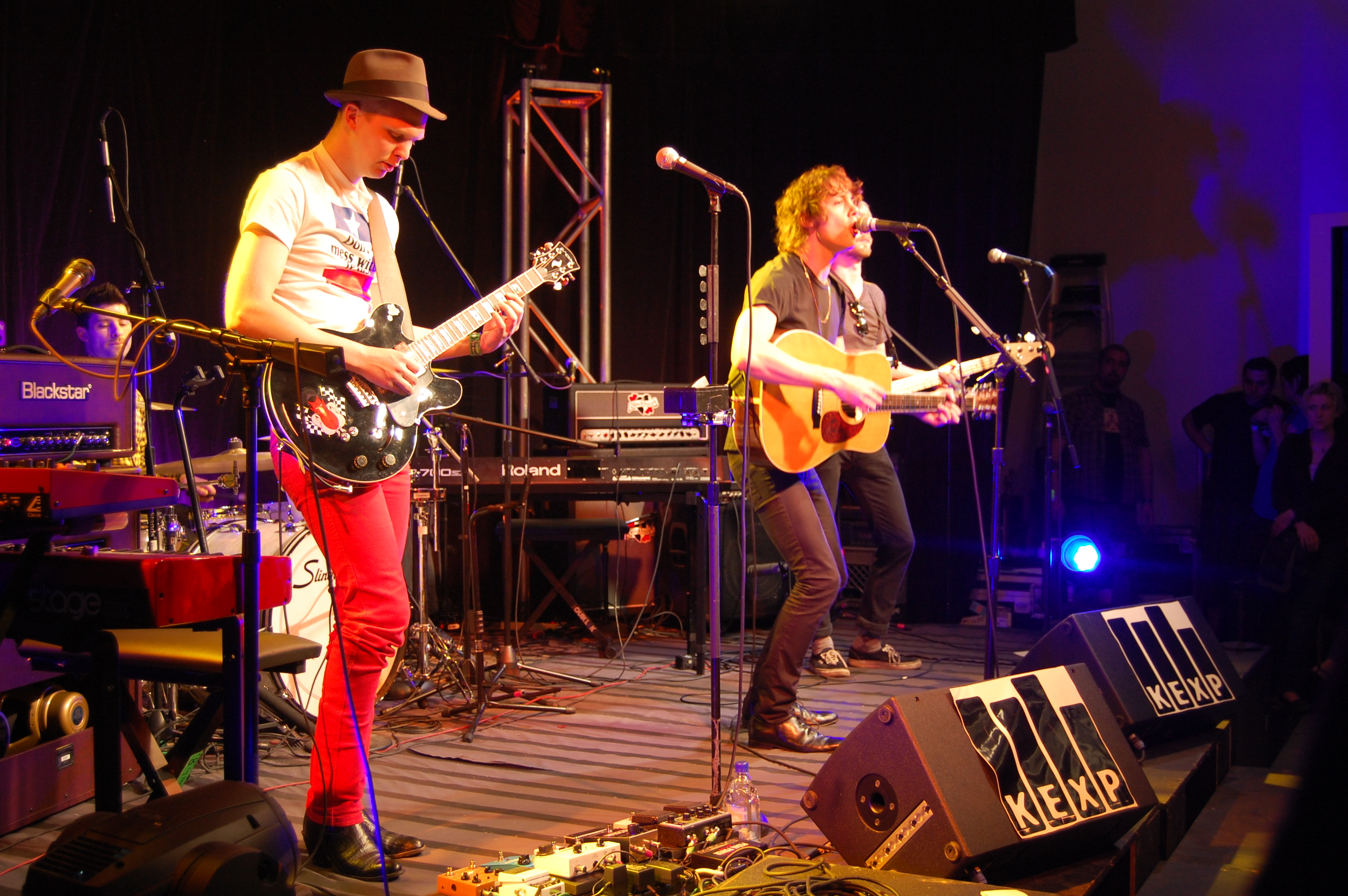
- Razorlight at SXSW, 2009
- Studio albums: 5
- Compilation albums: 1
- Singles: 18
- Music videos: 10

The discography of Razorlight, an English indie rock band, consists of five studio albums, one compilation album and thirteen singles. Razorlight's debut album, Up All Night, was released in the United Kingdom in June 2004 and reached number three on the UK Albums Chart. The album included the single "Somewhere Else", which peaked at number two on the UK singles chart. The band contributed the song "Kirby's House" to the War Child charity album Help!: A Day in the Life.

The band released their second album, Razorlight, in July 2006 and it debuted at number one in the UK. The lead single from the album, "In the Morning", peaked at number three in the UK. The band's third album, Slipway Fires, was issued in November 2008, preceded by the lead single "Wire to Wire". The second single was "Hostage of Love"; however, it failed to enter the charts in any other country than Germany. As a result, planned further releases from the album were cancelled. After a ten-year break, the band released their fourth album, Olympus Sleeping, in October 2018.

== Albums ==
=== Studio albums ===
List of studio albums, with selected chart positions and certifications
Title	Details	Peak chart positions										Certifications
Title	Details	UK	AUT	BEL (FL)	FRA	GER	IRE	JPN	NL	SCO	US	Certifications
Up All Night	Released: 28 June 2004; Label: Vertigo (#6 02498 66804 7); Formats: CD, LP, digital download	3	—	—	—	—	22	43	— (Note: Up All Night did not enter the Dutch Album Top 100, but entered the Dutch Alternative Top 30 chart at number 17.)	4	—	BPI: 4× Platinum
Razorlight	Released: 17 July 2006; Label: Vertigo (#6 02517 01284 4); Formats: CD, LP, digital download	1	62	64	34	43	2	34	39	1	180	BPI: 5× Platinum; IRMA: 3× Platinum
Slipway Fires	Released: 3 November 2008; Label: Vertigo; Formats: CD, LP, digital download	4	10	23	62	4	8	53	88	7	— (Note: Slipway Fires did not enter the US Billboard 200, but peaked at number 23 on the US Heatseekers Albums Chart.)	BPI: Gold; BVMI: Gold
Olympus Sleeping	Released: 26 October 2018; Label: Atlantic Culture; Formats: CD, LP, digital download	27	—	—	—	—	—	—	—	36	—	
Planet Nowhere	Released: 25 October 2024; Label: V2; Formats: CD, LP, digital download	68	—	—	—	—	—	—	—	29	—	

=== Compilation albums ===
List of compilation albums, with selected chart positions and certifications
Title	Details	Peak chart positions		Certifications
Title	Details	UK	SCO	Certifications
Razorwhat? The Best of Razorlight	Released: 9 December 2022; Label: Mercury; Formats: CD, digital download	49	34	BPI: Silver

== Singles ==
List of singles, with selected chart positions and certifications, showing year released and album name
Title	Year	Peak chart positions										Certifications	Album
Title	Year	UK	AUT	BEL (FL)	CZ	EU	GER	IRE	NL	SCO	SWI	Certifications	Album
"Rock 'N' Roll Lies"	2003	56	—	—	—	—	—	—	—	67	—		Up All Night
"Rip It Up" ^{[A]}	2003	20	—	—	90	—	—	—	—	22	—		Up All Night
"Stumble and Fall"	2004	27	—	—	—	—	—	—	—	32	—		Up All Night
"Golden Touch"	2004	9	—	—	—	—	—	—	—	13	—	BPI: Platinum	Up All Night
"Vice"	2004	18	—	—	—	—	—	—	—	20	—		Up All Night
"Somewhere Else"	2005	2	—	—	—	—	—	22	—	2	—	BPI: Silver	Non-album single
"In the Morning"	2006	3	—	— (Note: "In the Morning" did not enter the Flanders Ultratop 50, but peaked at 18 on the Ultratip Bubbling Under Tip Chart.)	83	6	—	12	90	4	—	BPI: Platinum	Razorlight
"America"	2006	1	17	21	45	1	38	6	23	3	29	BPI: 2× Platinum	Razorlight
"Before I Fall to Pieces"	2006	17	—	—	—	—	—	20	—	19	—	BPI: Gold	Razorlight
"I Can't Stop This Feeling I've Got"	2007	44	—	—	—	—	—	—	—	32	—		Razorlight
"Hold On"	2007	80	—	—	—	—	—	—	—	24	—		Razorlight
"Wire to Wire"	2008	5	3	13	—	8	3	23	71	8	8	BPI: Silver; BVMI: Platinum	Slipway Fires
"Hostage of Love"	2009	— (Note: "Hostage of Love" did not enter the UK singles chart, but peaked at number 93 on the UK Physical Singles Chart.)	—	—	—	—	69	—	—	—	—		Slipway Fires
"Burberry Blue Eyes"	2009	—	—	—	—	—	—	—	—	—	—		Slipway Fires
"Sorry?"	2018	—	—	—	—	—	—	—	—	—	—		Olympus Sleeping
"Japanrock"	2018	—	—	—	—	—	—	—	—	—	—		Olympus Sleeping
"Got to Let the Good Times Back into Your Life"	2018	—	—	—	—	—	—	—	—	—	—		Olympus Sleeping
"Olympus Sleeping"	2018	—	—	—	—	—	—	—	—	—	—		Olympus Sleeping
"Carry Yourself"	2018	—	—	—	—	—	—	—	—	—	—		Olympus Sleeping
"Cops and Robbers"	2019	—	—	—	—	—	—	—	—	—	—		Non-album singles
"Burn, Camden, Burn"	2020	—	—	—	—	—	—	—	—	—	—		Non-album singles
"Call Me Junior"	2022	—	—	—	—	—	—	—	—	—	—		Non-album singles
"You Are Entering the Human Heart"	2022	—	—	—	—	—	—	—	—	—	—		Razorwhat? The Best of Razorlight
"—" denotes a recording that did not chart or was not released in that territory.

Notes

- A "Rip It Up" was originally released in the UK in 2003 and peaked at number 42, but was re-released in 2004 and reached new peak of 20.

== Music videos ==
- "Rock 'n' Roll Lies"
- "Vice"
- "Stumble and Fall"
- "Golden Touch"
- "Somewhere Else"
- "In the Morning"
- "I Can't Stop This Feeling I've Got"
- "America"
- "Wire to Wire"
- "Hostage of Love"
