= Somewhere Else (Razorlight song) =

2005 single by Razorlight

Single by Razorlight

from the album Up All Night (re-release)
- B-side: "Keep the Right Profile"; "Hang By, Hang By"; "Up All Night" (live); "Dub the Right Profile"
- Released: 11 April 2005
- Studio: Sphere, Abbey Road, Brixton Academy (London, England)
- Length: 3:16
- Label: Vertigo
- Songwriter: Johnny Borrell
- Producer: Razorlight

Razorlight singles chronology
"Rip It Up" (2004)	"Somewhere Else" (2005)	"In the Morning" (2006)

Music video
- "Somewhere Else" on YouTube

"Somewhere Else" is a song by English indie rock band Razorlight, and was featured as a bonus track on the 2005 re-release of their debut album, Up All Night. It was their first new material following that album and the first A-side recorded with drummer Andy Burrows. It became their biggest hit to date in the United Kingdom at the time when released as a single, debuting at number two in the UK Singles Chart, only to be bettered by "America", which charted at number one in October 2006. In 2007, the lyrics: "and I met a girl/She asked me my name/I told her what it was", were voted the third-worst lyrics of all time.

== Music video ==
The video features Johnny Borrell walking down a street in London, attempting to reenact the Bitter Sweet Symphony video and being beaten up by some teenagers whose mothers then follow him to a pub and beat him up again. By the end of the video Borrell, having soiled himself, is taken away in an ambulance saying "this is no way to treat the greatest songwriter of this generation". Although the beatings were unplanned the director kept them in on the grounds that they were "brilliant, just brilliant". A large portion of the video was filmed inside and outside the Northumberland Arms pub.

== Track listings ==
UK CD1

1. "Somewhere Else"
2. "Keep the Right Profile"

UK CD2

1. "Somewhere Else"
2. "Hang By, Hang By"
3. "Up All Night" (live in California)
4. Enhanced section: link to download five free live tracks

UK 7-inch single

A. "Somewhere Else"
B. "Dub the Right Profile"

== Charts ==
=== Weekly charts ===
Chart (2005)	Peak position
Europe (Eurochart Hot 100)	9
Ireland (IRMA)	22
Scottish Singles Sales (Official Charts)	2
UK Singles (Official Charts)	2
UK Rock & Metal (Official Charts)	1

=== Year-end charts ===
Chart (2005)	Position
UK Singles (OCC)	42

== Certifications ==
Region	Certification	Certified units/sales
United Kingdom (BPI)	Silver	200,000^{‡}
^{‡} Sales+streaming figures based on certification alone.

== Release history ==
Region	Date	Format	Label	Ref.
United Kingdom	11 April 2005	CD	Vertigo	
United States	25 April 2005	Alternative radio	Universal	
