= Vice (Razorlight song) =

2004 single by Razorlight

Single by Razorlight

from the album Up All Night
- Released: 13 September 2004
- Length: 3:25
- Label: Vertigo
- Songwriter: Johnny Borrell
- Producers: John Cornfield, Razorlight

Razorlight singles chronology
"Golden Touch" (2004)	"Vice" (2004)	"Rip It Up" (2004)

"Vice" is the fifth single released by English rock band Razorlight, taken from their debut album, Up All Night (2004). It followed "Golden Touch" into the UK top 20. The lyrics feature the word "lover" spelled out in letters, the outro repeating this several times. Near the end of the song, Johnny Borrell gave out his then mobile phone number, allowing fans to call or text him.

The B-side to one format of the single is a cover of Outkast's "Hey Ya!," recorded with the London Community Gospel Choir (who also appeared on Blur's hit "Tender").

== Track listings ==
- UK CD1
1. "Vice" – 3:13
2. "Hey Ya!" (Jo Whiley Session) – 4:16
- UK CD2
1. "Vice" – 3:13
2. "Believe in Me" – 1:52
3. "Anabelle Says – 4 Track" – 2:59
- UK 7-inch single
1. "Vice" (full length radio mix) – 3:13
2. "Golden Touch" (Jo Wiley session) – 3:20
