= Before I Fall to Pieces =

2006 single by Razorlight

Single by Razorlight

from the album Razorlight
- B-side: "Teenage Kicks"; "Boys Don't Cry"
- Released: 18 December 2006
- Length: 3:22
- Label: Vertigo
- Songwriters: Johnny Borrell; Andy Burrows
- Producers: Razorlight; Chris Thomas

Razorlight singles chronology
"America" (2006)	"Before I Fall to Pieces" (2006)	"I Can't Stop This Feeling I've Got" (2007)

"Before I Fall to Pieces" is a song by English indie rock band Razorlight, the fifth track on their self-titled second album. Written by band members Johnny Borrell and Andy Burrows, it was released as the third single from the album on 18 December 2006. The song peaked at number 17 on UK Singles Chart and number 20 on the Irish Singles Chart.

Borrell called song the catalyst for "landfill indie". He said: "I think you can kind of say that in 2006, at the start of this [song], music was in quite an interesting place. Then three-and-a-half minutes later it's fucked."

== Music video ==
The official music video for "Before I Fall to Pieces" features Scorpio (aka Nikki Diamond) from TV's Gladiators and actor Guy Pearce.

== Track listings ==
UK CD single

1. "Before I Fall to Pieces" (Borrell, Burrows)
2. "Teenage Kicks" (John O'Neill)
3. "In the Morning" (acoustic) (Borrell)

UK 7-inch single

1. "Before I Fall to Pieces" (Johnny Borrell, Andy Burrows)
2. "Boys Don't Cry" (Michael Dempsey, Robert Smith, Lol Tolhurst)

UK DVD single

1. "Before I Fall to Pieces" (video)
2. "In the Morning" (video)

== Charts ==
=== Weekly charts ===
Chart (2006–2007)	Peak position
Ireland (IRMA)	20
Scottish Singles Sales (Official Charts)	19
Slovakia Airplay (ČNS IFPI)	45
UK Singles (Official Charts)	17

=== Year-end charts ===
Chart (2007)	Position
UK Singles (OCC)	180

== Certifications ==
Region	Certification	Certified units/sales
United Kingdom (BPI)	Gold	400,000^{‡}
^{‡} Sales+streaming figures based on certification alone.
