= Funny Looking Angels =

Studio album by Smith & Burrows
- Released: 25 November 2011
- Length: 34:47
- Label: Kitchenware

Singles from Funny Looking Angels
- 1. "Funny Looking Angels" Released: 2011; 2. "When the Thames Froze" Released: 12 December 2011

Funny Looking Angels is a collaborative Christmas album recorded by Smith & Burrows, a band made up of English musicians Tom Smith (Editors) and Andy Burrows (I Am Arrows, Razorlight, ex-We Are Scientists). It was released on 25 November 2011 through Kitchenware Records.

The album contains five covers: "Only You" by Yazoo, Black's "Wonderful Life", "Funny Looking Angels" by Delta, "On and On" by Longpigs, and "The Christmas Song" by Nat King Cole.

== Promotion ==
"Funny Looking Angels" was released as the lead single to promote the album.

The second single, "When the Thames Froze", was released on 12 December 2011. It has peaked at number 32 on the UK Indie Chart, and entered national charts in Belgium and the Netherlands.

== Critical reception ==
Professional ratings
Aggregate scores
| Source | Rating |
|---|---|
| Metacritic | 63/100 |
Review scores
| Source | Rating |
| AllMusic | 3.5/5 stars |
| Clash | 7/10 |
| Drowned in Sound | 7/10 |
| The Independent | 4/5 stars |
| NME | 1/10 |

According to the review aggregator Metacritic, Funny Looking Angels received "generally favorable reviews" based on a weighted average score of 63 out of 100 from 9 critic scores.

== Track listing ==
Funny Looking Angels track listing
| No. | Title | Length |
|---|---|---|
| 1. | "In the Bleak Midwinter" | 2:12 |
| 2. | "When the Thames Froze" | 5:04 |
| 3. | "As the Snowflakes Fall" | 3:31 |
| 4. | "Funny Looking Angels" | 3:35 |
| 5. | "Wonderful Life" | 4:22 |
| 6. | "Only You" | 3:16 |
| 7. | "On and On" | 4:06 |
| 8. | "Rosslyn" | 1:42 |
| 9. | "This Ain't New Jersey" | 4:50 |
| 10. | "The Christmas Song" (featuring Agnes Obel) | 2:14 |
| Total length: | | 34:47 |

== Charts ==
| Chart (2011) | Peak position |
|---|---|
| Belgian Albums (Ultratop Flanders) | 14 |
| Belgian Albums (Ultratop Wallonia) | 81 |
| Dutch Albums (Album Top 100) | 32 |
| German Albums (Offizielle Top 100) | 87 |
| UK Album Downloads (OCC) | 22 |
| UK Independent Albums (OCC) | 8 |
