= Company (Andy Burrows album) =

Studio album by Andy Burrows
- Released: October 22, 2012 (UK)
- Genre: Indie rock
- Label: PIAS UK
- Producer: Tim Baxter & Andy Burrows

Professional ratings
Review scores
Source	Rating
NME	(7/10)

Company is the second solo album by Andy Burrows. It was released on 22 October 2012 by Play It Again Sam Records. The album was written and co-produced by Burrows and Tim Baxter, and features Burrows performing the majority of the instrumentation.

== Background and recording ==
After leaving Razorlight in 2009, Burrows collaborated on several musical projects, including I Am Arrows, We Are Scientists and a Christmas album Funny Looking Angels with Editors frontman Tom Smith.

The album was written and recorded primarily in London, the production combines melodic pop sensibilities with introspective lyrics.

== Release and reception ==
Several singles were released from the album, including "Hometown", "Because I Know That I Can", "Keep Moving On" and "If I Had a Heart". None of the singles charted in the UK, but they received modest radio play and were praised by reviewers.

The album received mixed-to-positive reviews from critics.

== Track listing ==
All tracks are written by Andy Burrows.

No.	Title	Length
1.	"Company"	3:57
2.	"Because I Know That I Can"	3:05
3.	"Keep on Moving On"	2:37
4.	"Maybe You"	4:12
5.	"If I Had a Heart"	3:55
6.	"Hometown"	3:57
7.	"Somebody Calls Your Name"	3:19
8.	"Stars in the Sky"	3:50
9.	"Shaking the Colour"	3:23
10.	"Pet Air"	2:46
Total length:		35:02
