= I Can't Stop This Feeling I've Got =

Single by Razorlight

from the album Razorlight
- B-side: "When Doves Cry", "These Days"
- Released: 19 March 2007
- Genre: Indie rock
- Length: 3:25
- Label: Mercury, Vertigo Records
- Songwriters: Johnny Borrell, Björn Ågren, Razorlight
- Producer: Chris Thomas

Razorlight singles chronology
"Before I Fall to Pieces" (2006)	"I Can't Stop This Feeling I've Got" (2007)	"Hold On" (2007)

"I Can't Stop This Feeling I've Got" is a song by the English indie rock band Razorlight, and is the sixth track on their 2006 second album, Razorlight. The song was released in March 2007 as the third single from that album in the United Kingdom.

During the week of 17 March 2007, the single reached the Top 20 in radio airplay. It was the fifth Razorlight single to do so.

The song was developed from another track penned by Johnny Borrell called "The Pilot" which used the same chord sequence.

== Track listings ==
- CD 6 02517 24345 3
1. "I Can't Stop This Feeling I've Got"
2. "When Doves Cry"
  - A cover of the 1984 Prince song.
3. "These Days"
  - A cover of the Jackson Browne song.
  - Released on the CD version of the single only.

== Reception ==
A review in the Northern Echo called "I Can't Stop This Feeling I've Got" "The weakest track so far in from the band's platinum second album".
