= David 'Skully' Sullivan Kaplan =

- Born: David Sullivan Kaplan; July 9, 1979 (age 46); New York, U.S.
- Other names: Skully
- Occupation: Drummer

David Sullivan Kaplan (born July 9, 1979 in New York) is an American drummer and member of the London-based band Razorlight.

== Career ==
Kaplan started his career in the Long Island-based The Reunion Show, which split in 2004. He briefly was a member of Action Action before later joining six-man dance-rock ensemble Men, Women & Children. When Andy Burrows left Razorlight, “Skully” took over the drums. Initially it was reported he would be in the band as a touring member until the end of 2009; since then he has become an official member.
