= The Colour of My Dreams =

Studio album by Andy Burrows
- Released: 26 May 2008 (UK)
- Genre: Indie rock

Andy Burrows studio chronology
The Colour of My Dreams (2008)	Sun Comes Up Again (2010)

Professional ratings
Review scores
Source	Rating
NME	(7/10)

The Colour of my Dreams is the debut album by former Razorlight and We Are Scientists drummer Andy Burrows. The album was in aid of charity with all proceeds donated to a hospice for children in Winchester, Burrows' home town. The songs on the record are from a book of poetry Burrows found written by a close family friend. The album was recorded in Burrows' home. The album artwork comes from local artist and teacher, David Thomas.

== Overview ==
The album received praise from the other members of the Razorlight band. Bassist Carl Dalemo said that it had been in itself huge progress for the profile of Razorlight.

To support the release of The Colour of my Dreams, Burrows organised a one-off charity concert at Islington's union chapel where the band had performed for MENCAP in November 2007. As well as Burrows performing songs from the album, other musicians and celebrities offered their support, notably members of Editors, The Guillemots, celebrity chef Jamie Oliver and artist Lucy Rose.

== Track listing ==
All lyrics are written by Peter Dixon; all music is composed by Andy Burrows.

No.	Title	Length
1.	"Boxes"	1:34
2.	"Big Chief Grandad"	1:00
3.	"The Colour of My Dreams"	1:56
4.	"Missionary Sales"	1:06
5.	"Teacher Goodbye"	1:16
6.	"Peace"	1:01
7.	"Moon"	0:50
8.	"Drummer Boy"	1:29
9.	"Winter"	1:00
10.	"Cuddle"	0:54
11.	"Lighthouse Men"	0:54
Total length:		13:08
