= Planet Nowhere =

Studio album by Razorlight
- Released: 25 October 2024
- Studio: Space Mountain, Spain
- Length: 32:39
- Label: V2
- Producer: Johnny Borrell; George Murphy; Youth

Razorlight chronology
Olympus Sleeping (2018)	Planet Nowhere (2024)

Planet Nowhere is the fifth album by English rock band Razorlight, released on 25 October 2024 through V2 Records. It is the first album for 16 years featuring the band's 'classic' line-up of lead vocalist Johnny Borrell, guitarist Björn Ågren, bassist Carl Dalemo, and drummer Andy Burrows.

== Background ==
In April 2021, the band announced the return of the original lineup, featuring Borrell and Ågren (who rejoined in 2019) along with Burrows and Dalemo. The newly reunited group announced a livestreamed concert to be held on 2 June 2021. Razorlight released new songs in 2022—a single, "Call Me Junior", and two songs on a best-of compilation, "You Are Entering the Human Heart" and "Violence Forever?", but Borrell revealed he thought about ending the band if they hadn't been able to make further new music. In late 2023 the band travelled to Spain for a five-day recording session with producer Youth at his Space Mountain studio in Sierra Nevada mountain range. The final day of the session yielded the opening single "Scared of Nothing". The album was completed during further sessions at Space Mountain in early 2024.

The album is dedicated to music producer Philip Bagenal and former Chelsea FC footballer Gianluca Vialli.

== Track listing ==
Planet Nowhere track listing
No.	Title	Writer(s)	Producer(s)	Length
1.	"Zombie Love"	Andy Burrows; Johnny Borrell	George Murphy; Borrell; Youth	2:37
2.	"U Can Call Me"	Borrell	Murphy; Borrell	3:39
3.	"Taylor Swift = US Soft Propaganda"	Björn Ågren; Borrell	Murphy; Borrell	2:05
4.	"Dirty Luck"	Borrell	Murphy; Borrell; Youth	4:49
5.	"Scared of Nothing"	Borrell	Youth	3:47
6.	"F.O.B.F."	Borrell	Murphy; Borrell; Youth	3:05
7.	"Empire Service"	Borrell; Lauren Rothery	Youth	3:08
8.	"Cyclops"	Borrell	Murphy; Borrell; Youth	3:02
9.	"Cool People"	Borrell	Murphy; Borrell	3:20
10.	"April Ends"	Ågren; Borrell	Youth	3:07
Total length:				32:39

== Personnel ==
Razorlight

- Johnny Borrell - vocals, guitar, synths, drums, Fender VI
- Andy Burrows - drums, vocals, percussion, synths
- Björn Ågren - guitar, synths, drums, percussion
- Carl Dalemo - bass, vocals

Additional musicians

- Joao Mello - Synths and echolette sax
- Reni Lane - Backing vocals
- Alex Reeves - Additional drums

== Charts ==
Chart performance for Planet Nowhere
Chart (2024)	Peak position
Scottish Albums (OCC)	29
UK Albums (OCC)	68
UK Independent Albums (OCC)	6
