= Stumble and Fall =

2004 single by Razorlight

Single by Razorlight

from the album Up All Night
- B-side: "We All Get Up"
- Released: 26 January 2004
- Length: 3:02
- Label: Vertigo
- Songwriter(s): Johnny Borrell
- Producer(s): John Cornfield

Razorlight singles chronology
"Rip It Up" (2003)	"Stumble and Fall" (2004)	"Golden Touch" (2004)

"Stumble and Fall" is a song by English indie rock band Razorlight, included as the ninth track on their 2004 debut studio album, Up All Night. It was released as a single on 26 January 2004, reaching number 27 on the UK Singles Chart.

== Track listings ==
UK CD1

1. "Stumble and Fall"
2. "For Georgia, at the Hammersmith Working Mens Club"

UK CD2

1. "Stumble and Fall"
2. "Control"
3. "Rip It Up" (Toerag demo)

UK 7-inch single

A. "Stumble and Fall"
B. "We All Get Up"

== Charts ==
Chart (2004)	Peak position
Scotland (OCC)	32
UK Singles (OCC)	27
UK Rock & Metal (OCC)	9
