= Sun Come Up =

Sun Come Up may refer to

- Sun Come Up (film), a 2010 film
- "Sun Come Up" (song), a Glasses Malone song
- "'Til da Sun Cums Up", a Sir Mix-a-Lot song

== See also ==
- Sun Comes Up Again, a 2010 album by I Am Arrows
