= Wire to Wire (song) =

2008 single by Razorlight

Single by Razorlight

from the album Slipway Fires
- Released: 27 October 2008
- Studio: Air; Fish Factory
- Length: 3:01
- Label: Vertigo
- Songwriter: Johnny Borrell
- Producer: Mike Crossey

Razorlight singles chronology
| "Hold On" (2007) | "Wire to Wire" (2008) | "Hostage of Love" (2009) |

"Wire to Wire" is a song by English indie rock band Razorlight, written by singer Johnny Borrell, from their third album Slipway Fires. It was officially released as the album's first single on 27 October 2008. It was released for downloads digitally, however, on 26 September. The song is a piano-led ballad, described as "slow-burning".

The song marked the band's fourth UK top-five single and their fifth to chart in the UK top 10. It peaked at No. 5 on the UK Singles Chart, and No. 3 in Germany and Austria. The song has also peaked No. 8 in Switzerland, No. 13 in Flanders, No. 23 in Ireland, and No. 71 in the Netherlands. It spent seven weeks in the UK top 100, less than each of the first three singles from the preceding album Razorlight. The accompanying music video was shot by Oscar nominated feature film director Stephen Frears.

The track was used as part of Burberry's introductory advertisement in its Fall/Winter 2009 collection.

== Track listings ==
European 7-inch single

A. "Wire to Wire" – 2:58
B. "The Other Girl" – 1:54

European CD single

1. "Wire to Wire" – 3:01
2. "Killing Casanova" – 1:55

== Charts ==
=== Weekly charts ===
| Chart (2008–2009) | Peak position |
|---|---|
| Austria (Ö3 Austria Top 40) | 3 |
| Belgium (Ultratop 50 Flanders) | 13 |
| Belgium (Ultratip Bubbling Under Wallonia) | 16 |
| Europe (Eurochart Hot 100) | 12 |
| Germany (GfK) | 3 |
| Netherlands (Single Top 100) | 71 |
| Scottish Singles Sales (Official Charts) | 8 |
| Switzerland (Schweizer Hitparade) | 8 |
| UK Singles (Official Charts) | 5 |

=== Year-end charts ===
| Chart (2008) | Position |
|---|---|
| UK Singles (OCC) | 116 |

| Chart (2009) | Position |
|---|---|
| Austria (Ö3 Austria Top 40) | 15 |
| Belgium (Ultratop 50 Flanders) | 52 |
| Europe (Eurochart Hot 100) | 35 |
| Germany (Media Control GfK) | 6 |
| Switzerland (Schweizer Hitparade) | 46 |

=== Decade-end charts ===
| Chart (2000–2009) | Position |
|---|---|
| Germany (Media Control GfK) | 64 |

== Certifications ==
| Region | Certification | Certified units/sales |
|---|---|---|
| Germany (BVMI) | Platinum | 300,000^{^} |
^{^} Shipments figures based on certification alone.
