= Borrell 1 =

Studio album by Johnny Borrell
- Released: 22 July 2013
- Genre: Pop, Rock
- Label: Mercury Records
- Producer: Trevor Horn

Johnny Borrell chronology
Slipway Fires (2008)	Borrell 1 (2013)	The Atlantic Culture (2016)

Singles from Borrell 1
- 1. "Pan-European Supermodel Song (Oh! Gina)" Released: 22 July 2013

Professional ratings
Aggregate scores
Source	Rating
Metacritic	49/100
Review scores
Source	Rating
The Arts Desk	3/5 stars
DIY	5/10
Drowned in Sound	7/10
Evening Standard	4/5 stars
The Guardian	2/5 stars
The Independent	2/5 stars
Mojo	3/5 stars
NME	5/10
The Observer	3/5 stars
Q	3/5 stars

Borrell 1 is the debut studio album by English musician and Razorlight frontman Johnny Borrell. It was released in July 2013 under Universal Music.

== Reception ==
=== Critical response ===
Borrell 1 has received mixed reviews from critics. At Metacritic, which assigns a normalized rating out of 100 reviews from mainstream critics, the album received an average score of 49, based on 10 reviews. Kitty Empire, writing for The Observer gave the album three out of five stars and commented that it was "a catchy little record". She added "While Borrell 1 has many faults – too many sax solos, insufficient sackcloth and ashes – the jauntiness with which Zazou disport themselves often makes up for it." Barry Nicolson from the NME gave the album five out of ten and stated "Ultimately, it's sketchy and uneven, ridiculous in as many of the wrong ways as the right, but not quite the disaster its tracklisting would suggest."

=== Commercial performance ===
Borrell 1 only sold 594 copies during its first week on sale and it failed to secure a place on the UK Top 100 album chart. Speaking to Drowned in Sound about its poor sales, Borrell said "It is being heard and appreciated by as many people as possible! It is! If that’s 500 people, that’s 500 people. If those are the 500 people that are open enough at this point in time to hear this record, fucking fantastic man."

== Track listing ==
No.	Title	Length
1.	"Power To The Women"	2:14
2.	"Joshua Amrit"	3:41
3.	"Pan-European Supermodel Song (Oh! Gina)"	3:39
4.	"Ladder To Your Bed"	3:51
5.	"Dahlia Rhondo"	2:28
6.	"Cyrano Masochiste"	3:33
7.	"We Cannot Overthrow"	3:00
8.	"Each and Every Road"	2:51
9.	"Wild Today"	2:11
10.	"Dahlia Allegro"	3:09
11.	"Erotic Letter"	3:11
