= In the Morning (Razorlight song) =

2006 single by Razorlight

Single by Razorlight

from the album Razorlight
- B-side: "Black Jeans"; "Get It and Go" (live); "Doctor, Doctor"; "What's It All About?"
- Released: 3 July 2006
- Genre: Pop; rock
- Length: 3:42
- Label: Vertigo
- Songwriter: Johnny Borrell
- Producer: Chris Thomas

Razorlight singles chronology
"Somewhere Else" (2005)	"In the Morning" (2006)	"America" (2006)

"In the Morning" is a song by English indie rock band Razorlight, the opening track to their self-titled second studio album (2006). The song was released on 3 July 2006 as the lead single from that album, peaking at number three on the UK Singles Chart.

== Critical reception ==
"In the Morning" received mixed reviews from music critics who found it reminiscent of songs from Up All Night but were put off by Johnny Borrell's performance. Paul Stokes of NME praised the song's instrumentation and lyricism for its depiction of a hangover after a big party, saying that it "sets the tone for Razorlight to sound like the classic rock'n'roll band they always imagined in their heads: bigger, bolder, brighter." Noel Murray of The A.V. Club praised the song alongside "Before I Fall To Pieces" for being "large, admirably well-constructed guitar-pop." Doug Kamin of ARTISTdirect hailed the song as an instant rock anthem classic that "should be blasting from every dorm room this fall." John Murphy of MusicOMH praised the song for acting as a promising opener for the self-titled album because of Borrell's ability to deliver "a memorable chorus and a valedictory, celebratory atmosphere about it."

Michael Lomas of PopMatters felt that the song's instrumentation was ruined by Borrell's writing and vocal delivery, saying that he's "blissfully unaware of the irony in his words and how ridiculous he sounds singing them." Adam Moerder of Pitchfork put it alongside "Who Needs Love?" for having decent production but pretentious depth in its lyrics, saying that "Sadly, those lyrical disasters take place on the album's stronger songs." Mike Diver of Drowned in Sound criticized the band for over-hyping the song as a "classic" that has cod-reggae production and faux-philosophical lyrics, saying that "We are not about to allow Razorlight to shower their already overly praised frames in further commendations and recommendations, when the material they produce is not simply poor, as such, but depressingly, irredeemably average."

== Track listings ==
- UK 7-inch single

A. "In the Morning"
B. "Get It and Go" (live from Brixton)

- UK CD single
1. "In the Morning"
2. "Black Jeans"
- European maxi-CD single
1. "In the Morning"
2. "Doctor, Doctor"
3. "What's It All About?"

== Charts ==
=== Weekly charts ===
Chart (2006)	Peak position
Belgium (Ultratip Bubbling Under Flanders)	18
Europe (Eurochart Hot 100)	10
Ireland (IRMA)	12
Netherlands (Single Top 100)	90
Scottish Singles Sales (Official Charts)	4
UK Singles (Official Charts)	3

=== Year-end charts ===
Chart (2006)	Position
UK Singles (OCC)	52

== Certifications ==
Region	Certification	Certified units/sales
United Kingdom (BPI)	Platinum	600,000^{‡}
^{‡} Sales+streaming figures based on certification alone.
