= Rock 'n' Roll Lies =

"Rock ‘N’ Roll Lies"

Single by Razorlight

from the album Up All Night
- B-side: "In the City", "Action!", "Yeah Yeah Yeah"
- Released: 18 August 2003
- Genre: Indie rock
- Length: 3:08
- Label: Vertigo
- Songwriters: Johnny Borrell, John Fortis
- Producer: John Cornfield

Razorlight singles chronology
"Rock ‘N’ Roll Lies" (2003)	"Rip It Up" (2003)

"Rock ‘N’ Roll Lies" is the debut single by English indie rock band Razorlight. It is the second track on their 2004 debut album Up All Night.

Rock ‘N’ Roll Lies was released in August 2003 and peaked at No. 56 on the UK Singles Chart. This single version was re-recorded for the album at Sawmills Studio in Cornwall. For this second version, the lyric "no-one's heard her band yet but they play real well" was changed to "no-one's heard her band yet and no-one will".

== Track listing ==
- 7"
1. "Rock ‘N’ Roll Lies"
2. "In the City"
- CD
1. "Rock ‘N’ Roll Lies"
2. "Action!"
3. "Yeah Yeah Yeah"

== Chart performance ==
Chart (2003)	Peak position
UK Singles Chart	56
