= Andy Burrows =

English musician (born 1979)

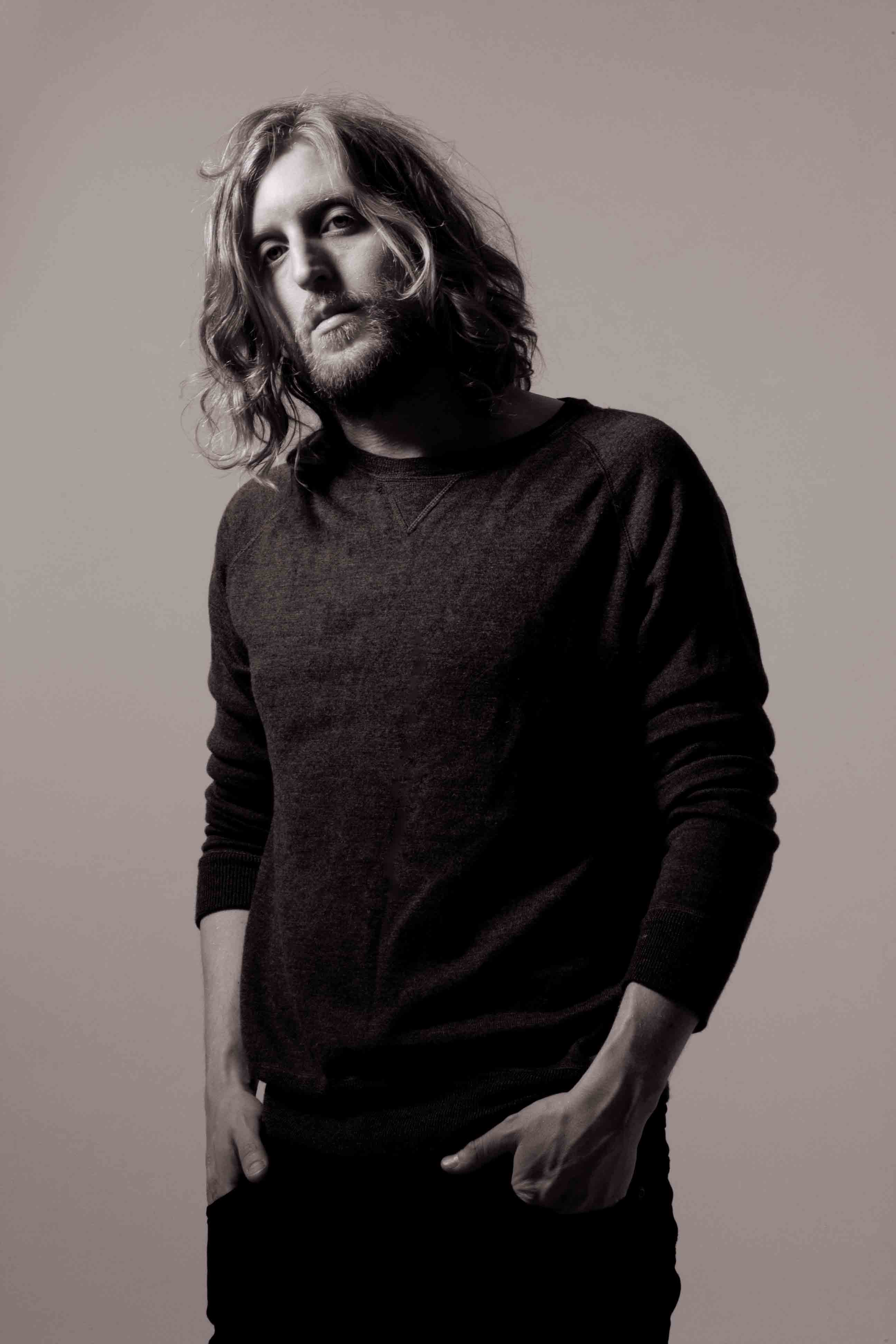
- Andy Burrows

Background information
- Born: Andrew William Burrows; 30 June 1979 (age 47); Winchester, Hampshire, England
- Genres: Indie rock, alternative rock
- Occupations: Singer, songwriter, drummer, guitarist
- Instruments: Guitar, piano, vocals, drums, synthesiser, banjo, oud, harmonica
- Years active: 2004–present
- Labels: Fiction, PIAS
- Member of: Razorlight
- Website: www.andyburrows.co.uk

Andrew William Burrows (born 30 June 1979) is an English songwriter and musician. He is best known as the drummer for Razorlight from 2004 until 2009 before rejoining in 2021. He has also served as the drummer for We Are Scientists from 2009 to 2014.

After he left Razorlight in 2009, Burrows went on to enjoy success as a solo artist and a soundtrack composer.

== Biography ==
=== Early life ===
Burrows was born on 30 June 1979 in Winchester and he was educated at The Westgate School and Peter Symonds College. He stated that the first albums he bought were Bad by Michael Jackson and a compilation album titled Ballads by The Beatles. The first instrument he played was the cornet and he later transitioned into drumming.

=== Razorlight (2004–2009;2021-present) ===
Burrows joined the band in May 2004. He was discovered in open audition to replace the original drummer for the band, who left in early 2004. After he joined Razorlight, the group released three albums, Up All Night which reached No. 3 in the UK Albums Chart; Razorlight which debuted at No. 1 in the UK chart and Slipway Fires which debuted at No. 4. His first performance with Razorlight was at London's Bull and Gate on 25 May 2004 – about a month before Up All Night was released.

Burrows was seen as a key figure in shaping Razorlight's sound and songs, having co-written the hits "America" and "Before I Fall to Pieces", and more recently from the album Slipway Fires – "Hostage of Love", "Burbery Blue Eyes", "60 Thompson" and "Stinger" with Johnny Borrell.

On 5 March 2009, Burrows left Razorlight with immediate effect, after playing for five years with the band. Burrows explained that there were "personal reasons" for the split.

In May 2021, it was announced that Burrows had rejoined Razorlight after 12 years alongside Johnny Borrell, Björn Ågren and Carl Dalemo (who rejoined the same time as Burrows). The band went on to tour across UK and EU festivals before starting work on the fifth Razorlight album.

=== We Are Scientists (2009–2014) ===
After Burrows left Razorlight, he almost immediately joined We Are Scientists. His first album with the band Barbara was released in June 2010. The band's fifth studio album and Burrows' second with them, TV en Français was released in March 2014. Burrows left the band in 2014, but has occasionally teamed up with them for live performances since his departure.

=== Solo and collaborative work (2008–present) ===
Burrows first released a solo album, The Colour of My Dreams, on 26 May 2008. The album was released to raise awareness and funds for the "Jack's Place" Appeal at Naomi House, a hospice for children in his home town of Winchester. The Colour of My Dreams was written and recorded at home by Burrows during Razorlight downtime, after he stumbled across a book of poems by an old family friend, Peter Dixon, and set about putting them to music. Using just GarageBand he began work in his flat and sings and plays all the instruments on the record.

Eleven days after he left Razorlight, it was revealed that Burrows had signed to Universal Records, the same record label as his ex-band. Six months later Burrows' new solo moniker I Am Arrows played their first show. Burrows revealed that he was working with Noah and the Whale producer Eliot James and the album Sun Comes Up Again was released in August 2010 and reached No. 38 in the UK Albums Chart. The song "Nice Try" from the album features in the film Friends with Benefits.

Editors frontman Tom Smith teamed up with Burrows to form Smith & Burrows – they released their debut album Funny Looking Angels in November 2011, an album of winter songs featuring the single "When the Thames Froze".

Burrows would drop his I Am Arrows moniker for his next solo album Company, which was released on 22 October 2012, and received critical acclaim. All singles from the album were put on the A-List on the BBC Radio 2 playlist.

Burrows would also spend time working with Columbia recording artist, Tom Odell, contributing drums and backing vocals to both the Wrong Crowd and Jubilee Road albums. He co-wrote "Sirens" from Odell's debut album, Long Way Down, "Here I Am" from Wrong Crowd, and the title track of Jubilee Road.

In 2018, he collaborated with the British author Matt Haig for the album Reasons To Stay Alive. The songs were composed by Burrows while Haig composed the lyrics for his songs. In August 2018, the title track of the album was released. The album was released by Fiction Records on 1 February 2019, featuring further singles, "Handle With Care" and "Barcelona".

=== Soundtrack work (2011–present) ===
Burrows played drums on the Arthur soundtrack produced by Mark Ronson. One of the songs is currently the theme tune to the ITV chat show, The Jonathan Ross Show. His drumming also features on the Ilan Eshkeri soundtrack to Johnny English Reborn. In 2012, Burrows was approached by the production company Lupus Films to work on The Snowman and The Snowdog, the follow-up to the 1982 classic animated film The Snowman. Collaborating with Eshkeri, Burrows co-wrote the soundtrack to the new film as well as writing and performing the official single from the film, "Light the Night". The flying-home sequence also uses an orchestral version of Burrows' track "Hometown" from his solo album Company. The score was nominated for a BAFTA craft award in April 2013. In early 2015, Burrows featured on a re-recording of Kate Miller-Heidke's song "Share Your Air", replacing the vocals of Passenger.

In November 2013, it was announced Burrows would join Ricky Gervais' comedy band Foregone Conclusion, for a nominal period of time as musical director. Before the close of that year the Burrows played three shows as MD and drummer of the band. The soundtrack of the film based on the band, David Brent: Life on the Road was co-produced by Burrows and Gervais and released via Gervais' own label Juxtaposition, distributed through Caroline International/Universal.

Burrows composed the soundtrack for Ricky Gervais' 2019 TV series, After Life.

== Personal life ==
Burrows resides in Hackney, London, with his wife and his two daughters, Chloe and Joni. He has maintained a good friendship with the lead vocalist of Editors, Tom Smith, who has collaborated with Burrows on Funny Looking Angels and within Burrows' solo discography. The two met at Glastonbury Festival in 2005 through Burrows' friendship with Smith's girlfriend Edith Bowman.

== Discography ==
Razorlight

- Razorlight (2006)
- Slipway Fires (2008)
- Planet Nowhere (2024)

We Are Scientists

- Barbara (2010)
- TV en Français (2014)

Foregone Conclusion

- Life on the Road (2016)

Solo albums

- The Colour of My Dreams (2008)
- Sun Comes Up Again (2010) (as I Am Arrows)
- Company (2012)
- Fall Together Again (2014)
- Reasons to Stay Alive (2019) (with Matt Haig)

Collaborations

- Funny Looking Angels (2011) (as Smith & Burrows)
- The Snowman and the Snowdog (2012)
- Only Smith & Burrows Is Good Enough (2021) (as Smith & Burrows)
