= I Am Arrows =

British indie rock band

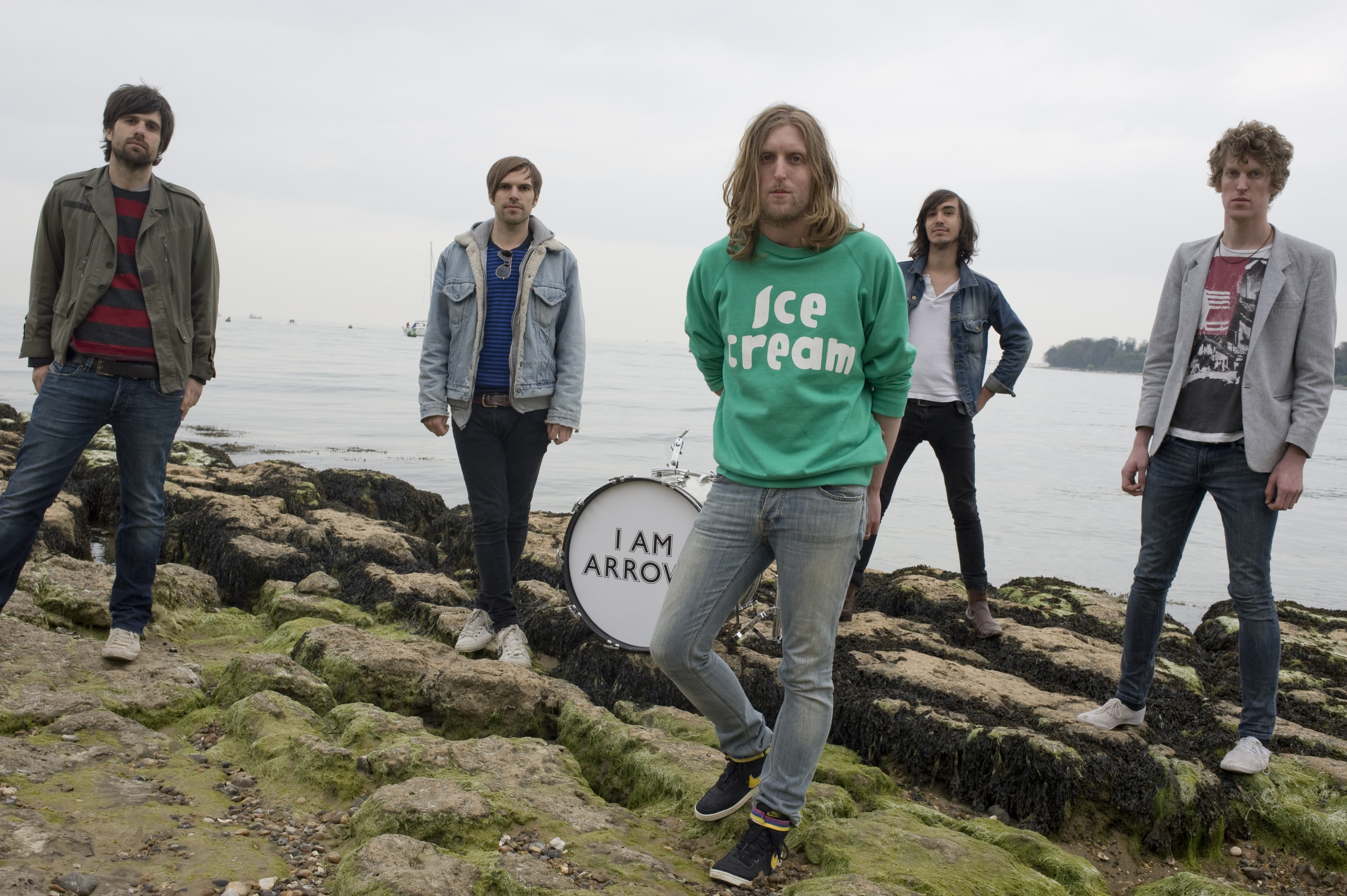
- I Am Arrows on the location for their first video

Background information
- Origin: United Kingdom
- Genres: Indie pop
- Years active: 2009–present
- Label: Universal
- Members: Andy Burrows; Ben Burrows; Adam Chetwood; Ben Chetwood; Nick Hill
- Website: www.iamarrows.com

I Am Arrows is an indie rock band founded by former Razorlight drummer Andy Burrows in June 2009. Eleven days after he left Razorlight, it was revealed that Burrows had signed to Universal Records – the same record label as his ex-band.

== Live ==
Although Andy Burrows wrote and recorded the album by himself, the band includes his younger brother, Ben (bass & backing vocals), brothers Adam and Ben Chetwood (lead guitar and drums, respectively) and Nick Hill (guitar and backing vocals)

The band played a summer residency at the Old Blue Last pub in Shoreditch through June and July 2010 and also played the Wickerman festival, along with supporting Muse at Stade De France in Paris and at the Wembley stadium in September.

I Am Arrows completed a 9-date full UK tour in September 2010. In March 2011 I am arrows supported Editors in a charity gig for Teenage Cancer Trust.

== Record of the week ==
I Am Arrows' single "Green Grass" was made BBC Radio 2 record of the week, it was also record of the week for Xfm and BBC 6 music. The single charted on the UK Singles Chart at #64 in August 2010.

== Discography ==
- Sun Comes Up Again (2010) #38 (UK Album Chart)

== Movies ==
Their song "Nice Try" is featured in the movie Friends with Benefits. Their song "Green Grass" was also featured in the third series of the British sitcom The Inbetweeners.
