= Hostage of Love =

"Hostage Of Love"

Single by Razorlight

from the album Slipway Fires
- A-side: "Hostage Of Love"
- Released: 12 January 2009
- Genre: Alternative rock
- Length: 3:44
- Songwriter(s): Johnny Borrell, Andy Burrows
- Producer(s): Mike Crossey

Razorlight singles chronology
""Wire To Wire"" (2008)	"Hostage Of Love" (2009)

"Hostage of Love" is the second single from Razorlight's third studio album, Slipway Fires, released on 12 January 2009.

The song featured biblical imagery running throughout the song, as during the songwriting process for Slipway Fires, Borrell was said to have been "learning a bit about Catholicism [and] was very interested in the concept that we’re ordinary sinners."

The music video is in black and white and depicts the band playing the song in a studio, though an alternative version has more recently appeared, with scenes evoking the religious themes mentioned above and also showing band travelling on the Paris Métro, ending at the station Boissière, whose name originates from the custom of remembering the crucifixion by hanging up boxwood on Palm Sunday.

== Commercial performance ==
In contrast to the lead single "Wire to Wire" which charted at #5 on the Official UK Singles Chart and charted in several other countries, indicating a continuation of the band's large success after their #1 hit "America", "Hostage of Love" was a commercial flop, having only charted at #69 in Germany. This was the last time the band would chart as of 2022. In spite of the band's efforts to promote the single, it failed to enter the UK Singles Chart. As a result, a planned third single release of "Burberry Blue Eyes" was cancelled.

== Track listing ==
1. "Hostage Of Love" - 3:44
2. "Wire To Wire" (WDR2 Acoustic Session Version) - 3:04
3. "In The Morning" (Live) - 3:59

== Chart performance ==
Chart (2009)	Peak position
UK Physical Singles Chart (Official Charts Company)	93
GfK Entertainment Charts	69
