= Razorlight (album) =

Studio album by Razorlight
- Released: 17 July 2006
- Studios: British Grove Studios, Chiswick, West London
- Genres: Indie rock, post-punk revival
- Length: 34:57
- Labels: Mercury, Vertigo
- Producers: Razorlight, Chris Thomas

Razorlight chronology
Up All Night (2004)	Razorlight (2006)	Slipway Fires (2008)

Singles from Razorlight
- 1. "In the Morning" Released: 3 July 2006; 2. "America" Released: 2 October 2006; 3. "Before I Fall to Pieces" Released: 18 December 2006; 4. "I Can't Stop This Feeling I've Got" Released: 19 March 2007; 5. "Hold On" Released: 9 July 2007

Razorlight is the second studio album by English indie rock band Razorlight. The album was released on 17 July 2006 in the United Kingdom and debuted at number 1 on the UK Albums Chart.

The band achieved their first and only number one hit from this album, with "America" peaking at the top of the UK Singles Chart in October 2006. The song also peaked at number 6 in Ireland, number 9 in the Netherlands, number 10 in New Zealand, number 17 in Austria, number 21 in Belgium, number 22 in France, number 29 in Switzerland and number 38 in Germany. "Before I Fall to Pieces" was a UK top 20 hit too, as was "In the Morning". "I Can't Stop This Feeling I've Got" was a minor hit.

The album has a more mature sound than their debut, and received a mixed reception. Although it scored 8/10 in NME, it was nominated for 'Worst Album' at the 2007 NME Awards – award winner Rudebox by Robbie Williams also scored 8/10.

== Critical reception ==
Professional ratings
Aggregate scores
Source	Rating
Metacritic	60/100
Review scores
Source	Rating
AllMusic	3.5/5 stars
ARTISTdirect	3.5/5 stars
The A.V. Club	B
Drowned in Sound	5/10
MusicOMH	2/5 stars
NME	8/10
Pitchfork	2.8/10
PopMatters	3/10
Rolling Stone	2/5 stars
Stylus Magazine	F

Razorlight received generally mixed reviews from music critics. At Metacritic, which assigns a normalised rating out of 100 to reviews from mainstream critics, the album received an average score of 60, based on 18 reviews.

Paul Stokes of NME gave high praise to the album's production and lyrics for being larger than life and containing sincere romantic tales that come after various parties, concluding that "It's [also] a record that sees Razorlight comfortably leap the "difficult second album" trap. Now that calls for a party." MacKenzie Wilson of AllMusic praised the band's collaboration with producer Chris Thomas of being able to craft different genres into a unique sound with sharp musicianship that helps set them apart from their contemporaries, saying that "They make honest indie rock for those looking for a solid, good song. There's no frills, no fancy production, just the purity of these songs." Doug Kamin of ARTISTdirect found the album's tight and polished sheen off-putting and its latter tracks lacking replay value but praised the first four tracks for their strong production and energetic tone, concluding that "this is ultimately going to age very well for Razorlight as they become arena rock gods in the years to come."

Dan Wale of Drowned in Sound felt disappointed with the album, saying that some decent tracks can't deviate listeners away from the band's attempt at maturity that comes across more sophomoric in its new sound, saying that "This is not a great album – that needs to be said while the dust is still settling. Though it's not bad, we have to disperse such a thick smokescreen before we can even start to ascertain its worth – any reward has already been bled out in the disparity between expectation and reality." John Murphy of MusicOMH said that despite Björn Ågren's guitar work saving Johnny Borrell's subpar tales of romance and rock star glory, the album reveals poor musicianship and retreads from their debut album, saying that "It's not so much that much of Razorlight is bad exactly, it's just very ordinary. In deciding to ditch their more spiky side and go all out for commercial glory, the band have lost sight of what made them special in the first place." Brian Hiatt of Rolling Stone admired the band's basic three instrument formula to deliver catchy pop rock tracks but felt that "the overall feel still falls somewhere between sterile and silly." Liz Colville of Stylus Magazine panned the album for recycling the same formula and influences found in the band's debut effort and delivering it under a studio polish that feels more self-satisfied than true artistic growth, saying that, "[T]he solipsism and trite accounts of benders from the first album are still there, but the music has gone exceedingly soft."

== Track listing ==
All lyrics are written by Johnny Borrell, unless otherwise noted; all music is composed by Razorlight.

No.	Title	Writer(s)	Length
1.	"In the Morning"		3:42
2.	"Who Needs Love?"		3:32
3.	"Hold On"		3:26
4.	"America"	Borrell, Andy Burrows	4:10
5.	"Before I Fall to Pieces"	Borrell, Burrows	3:22
6.	"I Can't Stop This Feeling I've Got"	Borrell, Björn Ågren	3:26
7.	"Pop Song 2006"		2:41
8.	"Kirby's House"		2:51
9.	"Back to the Start"		3:12
10.	"Los Angeles Waltz"		4:39
11.	"Keep the Right Profile" (iTunes Store bonus track)		3:28

== Personnel ==
- Johnny Borrell - vocals and guitar
- Björn Ågren - guitar
- Carl Dalemo - bass
- Andy Burrows - drums
- Produced by Chris Thomas except "America" produced by Razorlight
- Engineered by Jamie Johnson except "America" engineered by Sean Miller
- Assisted by Richard Cooper
- Recorded at British Grove Studios, London
- Additional engineering by Chris Thomas
- Mixed by Jeremy Wheatley
- Cover photography by Max Vadukul
- Other photography by Jill Furmanovsky

== Charts and certifications ==
=== Weekly charts ===
Chart (2006)	Peak position
Australian Albums (ARIA)	71
Austrian Albums (Ö3 Austria)	62
Belgian Albums (Ultratop Flanders)	64
Belgian Albums (Ultratop Wallonia)	90
Danish Albums (Hitlisten)	29
Dutch Albums (Album Top 100)	39
French Albums (SNEP)	34
German Albums (Offizielle Top 100)	39
Irish Albums (IRMA)	2
New Zealand Albums (RMNZ)	33
UK Albums (Official Charts)	1
US Billboard 200	180

=== Singles ===
- "In the Morning" (3 July 2006; UK #3)
- "America" (2 October 2006; UK #1)
- "Before I Fall to Pieces" (18 December 2006; UK #17)
- "I Can't Stop This Feeling I've Got" (19 March 2007; UK #44)
- "Hold On" (9 July 2007; UK #80)

=== Certifications ===
Region	Certification	Certified units/sales
Ireland (IRMA)	3× Platinum	45,000^{^}
United Kingdom (BPI)	5× Platinum	1,550,000
^{^} Shipments figures based on certification alone.

== Release history ==
Country	Date	Label	Format	Catalog
Japan	12 July 2006	Universal International	CD	UICR-1048
United Kingdom	17 July 2006	Mercury, Vertigo	LP	6 02517 01090 1
United Kingdom	17 July 2006	Mercury, Vertigo	CD	6 02517 01284 4
United Kingdom	17 July 2006	Mercury, Vertigo	CD / DVD	6 02517 01290 5
United States	22 August 2006	Universal Motown, Vertigo	CD	B0007215-02 / 6 02517 03360 3
United States	22 August 2006	Universal Motown, Vertigo	CD / DVD	B0007430-10 / 6 02517 03795 3

== See also ==
- List of UK Albums Chart number ones of the 2000s
