= Golden Touch (song) =

2004 single by Razorlight

Single by Razorlight

from the album Up All Night
- B-side: "Bright Lights" (demo); "If You Know What I Know"; "Losing Your Mind" (by Johnny Borrell); "Dean, Take Your Time"
- Released: 14 June 2004
- Length: 3:25
- Label: Vertigo
- Songwriter: Johnny Borrell
- Producer: John Cornfield

Razorlight singles chronology
"Stumble and Fall" (2004)	"Golden Touch" (2004)	"Vice" (2004)

Music video
- "Golden Touch" on YouTube

"Golden Touch" is a song by English indie rock band Razorlight, appearing as the eighth track on their debut studio album, Up All Night (2004). The song is based on MTV2 and Queens of Noize DJ Mairead Nash, with whom Johnny Borrell had a brief relationship. "Golden Touch" was released as the fourth single from Up All Night in June 2004 and peaked at No. 9 on the UK Singles Chart. In 2006, it was ranked 87th on Q magazine's "100 Greatest Songs Ever".

== Track listings ==
UK CD single

1. "Golden Touch" (full length)
2. "Golden Touch" (Jo Whiley session featuring the Gospel Singers)

UK limited-edition CD single

1. "Golden Touch" (full length)
2. "Bright Lights" (demo version)

UK maxi-CD single

1. "Golden Touch" (full length)
2. "If You Know What I Know"
3. "Losing Your Mind" (by Johnny Borrell)

UK limited-edition 7-inch single

A. "Golden Touch"
B. "Dean, Take Your Time"

== Charts ==
Chart (2004)	Peak position
Scottish Singles Sales (Official Charts)	13
UK Singles (Official Charts)	9

== Certifications ==
Region	Certification	Certified units/sales
United Kingdom (BPI)	Platinum	600,000^{‡}
^{‡} Sales+streaming figures based on certification alone.

== Release history ==
Region	Date	Format(s)	Label(s)	Ref.
United Kingdom	14 June 2004	7-inch vinyl; CD	Vertigo	
United States	14 September 2004	Alternative radio	Vertigo	
