= Naomi and Jack's =

Coordinates: 51.152557°N 1.345403°W

- Wessex Children's Hospice Trust

Geography
- Location: Sutton Scotney, Hampshire, England

Services
- Standards: CQC Rating: Outstanding

History
- Founded: 1997

Links
- Website: https://www.naomiandjacks.org.uk/
- Lists: Hospitals in England

Naomi and Jack's (previously known as Naomi House & Jacksplace) is a hospice for children and young adults in the Wessex region. The hospice is located at Sutton Scotney, near Winchester, Hampshire, England. It is also known as The Wessex Children's Hospice Trust, (No.1002832). Naomi and Jack's provide care to more than 650 children and young adults with medically complex conditions. The care and support that Naomi and Jack's offers is claimed to be unique in central southern England. They offer respite care, emergency support, a hospice at home service, end of life care and family support.

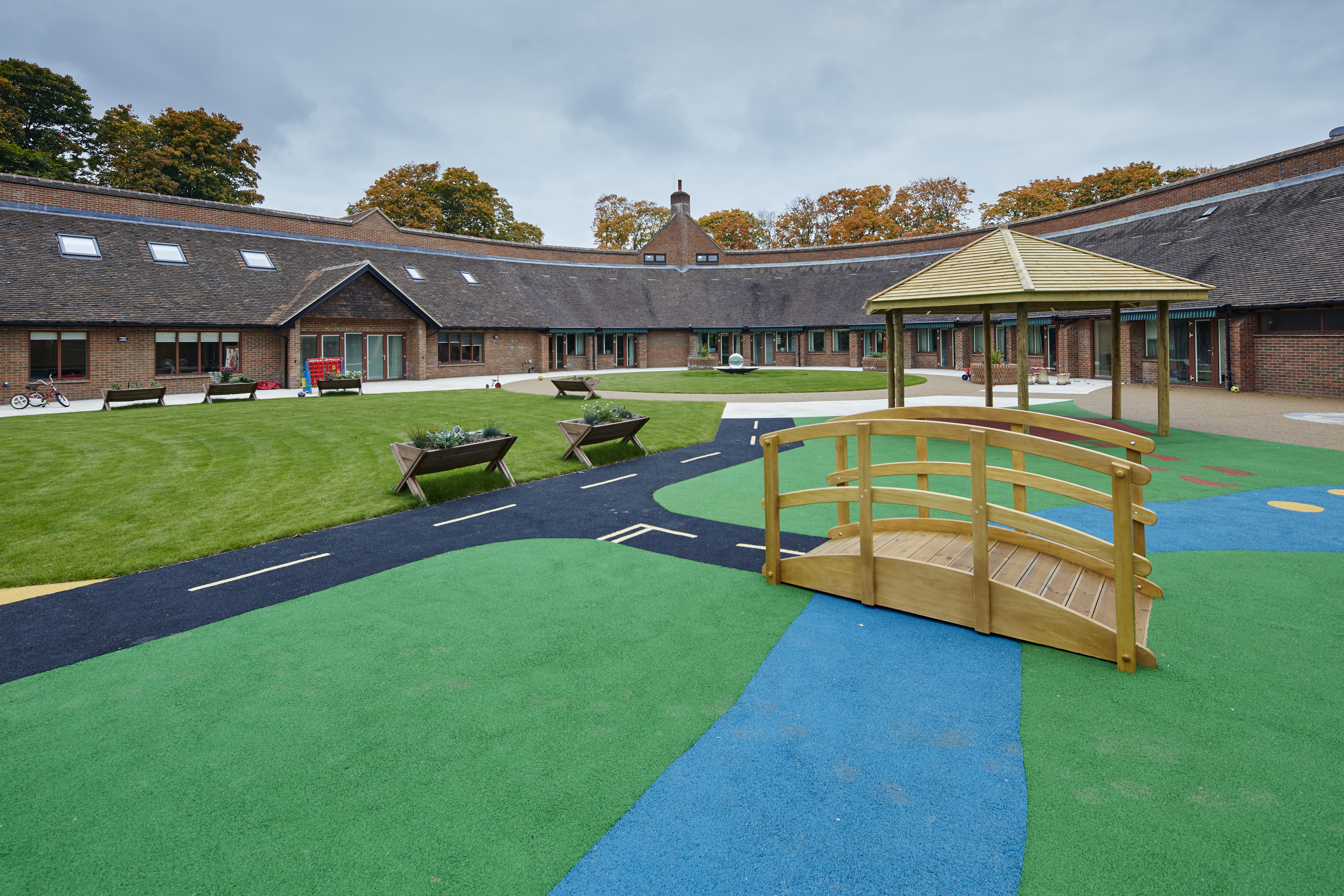
Gardens at Naomi House hospice

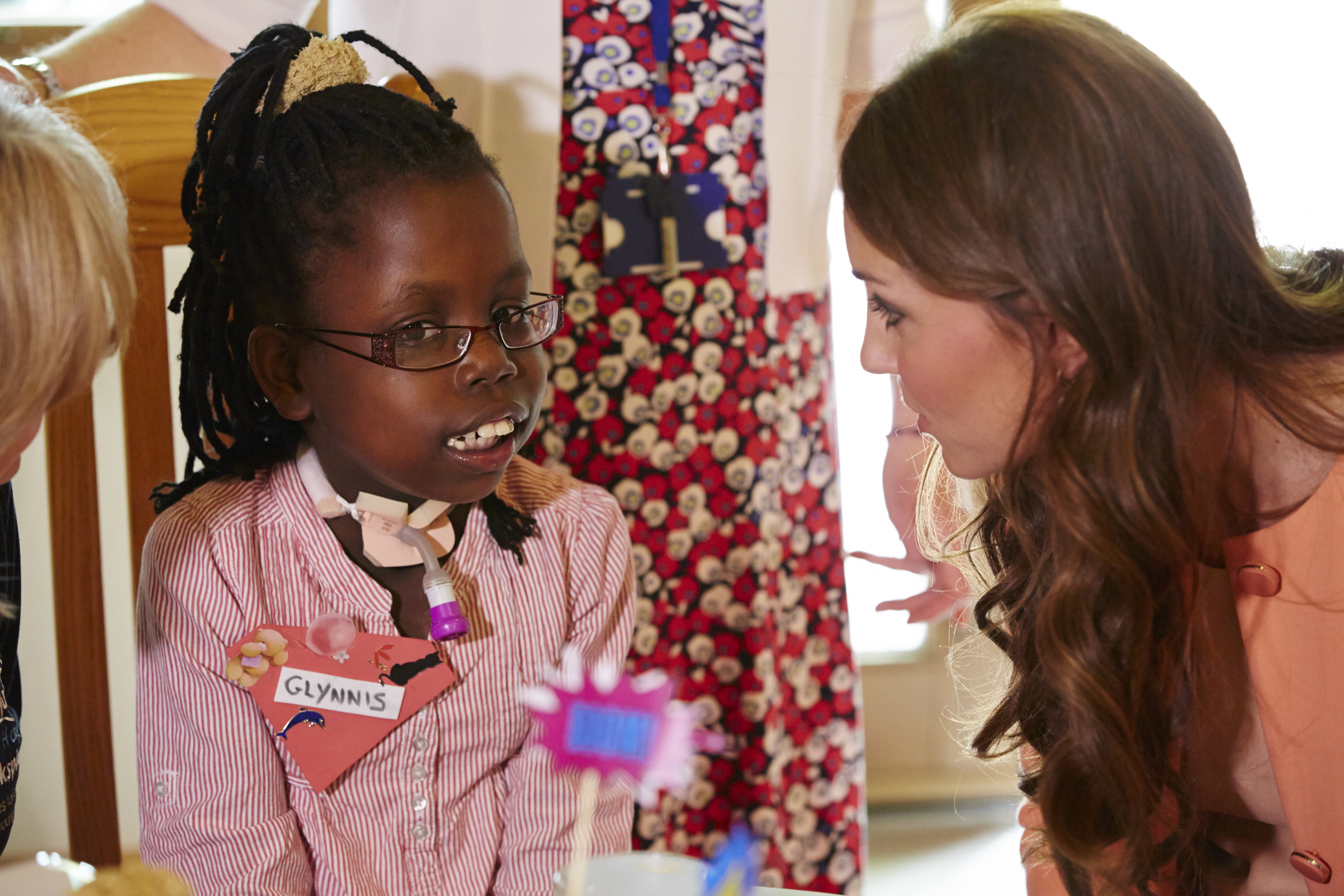
Catherine, Duchess of Cambridge, meets a child at Naomi House & Jacksplace

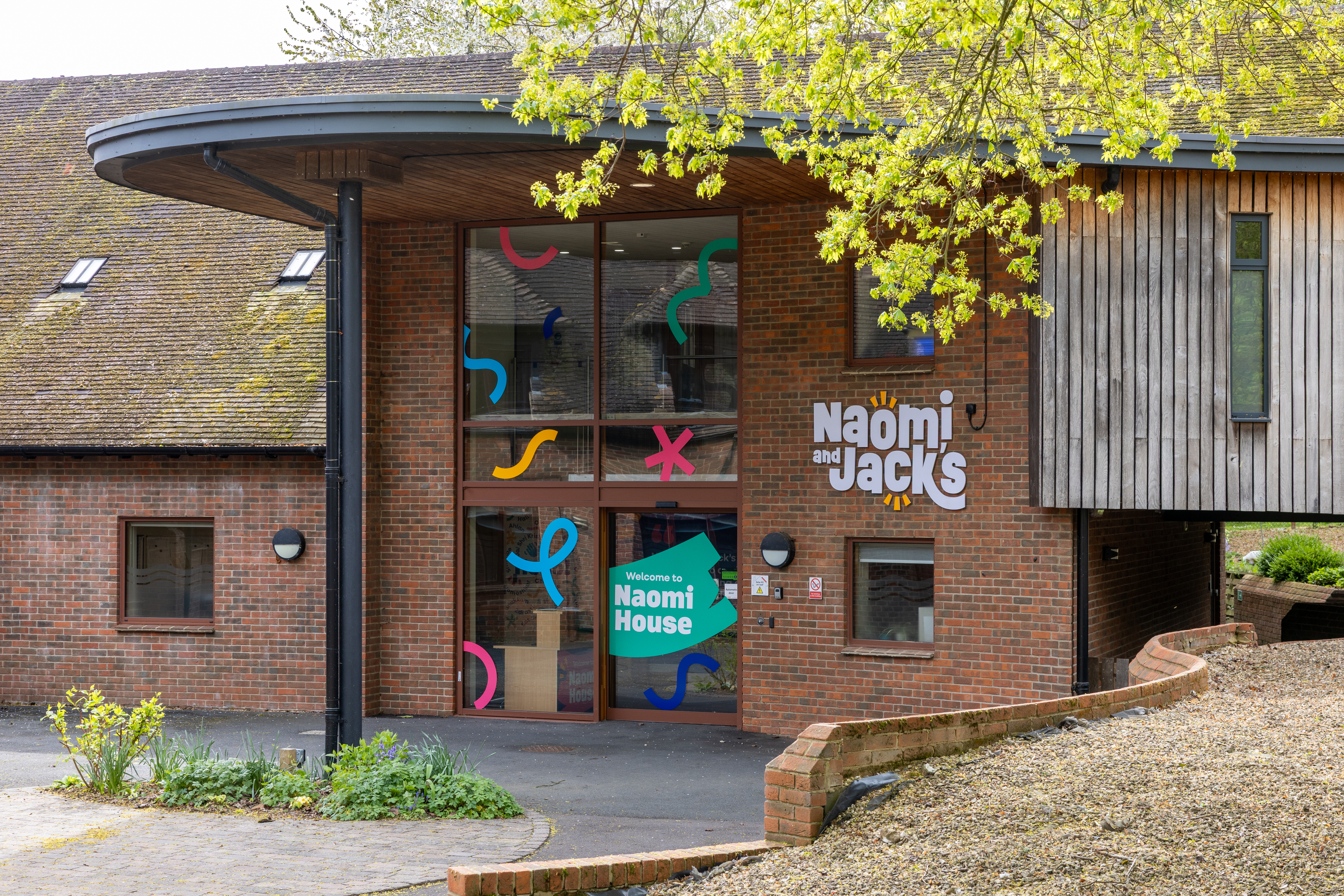
The front of Naomi House, specialist centre at Naomi and Jack's hospice in Sutton Scotney.

The hospice provides palliative care to children, young adults and their families in communities across seven counties - Berkshire, Dorset, Hampshire, Isle of Wight, Surrey, West Sussex and Wiltshire.

Naomi House cares for babies and children, from birth up to the age of 18, and Jack's Place offers care for young adults aged 16 to 35. Both specialist centres are purpose-built for each age group.

As of 2012 the charity needed to raise £8.5 million a year to run a full service and deliver its plans. The charity receives less than 15% of its income from statutory sources, the remaining amount is raised and donated by individuals, groups and businesses. Many people get involved by organizing or taking part in fundraising events whereas other individuals choose to volunteer their time.

The hospices are staffed by Paediatric Palliative Care Consultants, doctors, nurses, carers and therapy specialists.

Naomi House has been open to families since June 1997. Jack's Place was officially opened by the Countess of Wessex on 30 November 2010. The hospices have cared for more than 1,100 families.

There are ten children's bedrooms and five family bedrooms at Naomi House and seven bedrooms available at Jack's Place. There are facilities such as a hydrotherapy pool, multi-sensory room, music therapy, art and play rooms in the hospice.

The charity's Clarendon Way Walk is the annual flagship event that sees thousands of supporters walk 26 miles (42 km) along the Clarendon Way, between Winchester and Salisbury Cathedrals.

Naomi House launched a major redevelopment of the hospice building in 2014. Called the Caterpillar Appeal, the charity raised more than £4 million to fully refurbish the hospice. Changes to the building included larger bedrooms, a new spiritual space, improved family accommodation, better kitchen and dining spaces and the creation of areas for music therapy and messy play.

The hospice is located on the Sutton Manor Estate, once home to J Arthur Rank and The Rank Organisation. The charity pays an annual peppercorn rent of 12 red roses to the estate's owners, the Cornelius-Reid family, each Midsummer's Day. Naomi House is named after Naomi Cornelius-Reid. Jack's Place is named after Jack Witham, a wealthy local businessman who left the charity an exceptionally generous legacy in his will.
