= Sun Comes Up Again =

Studio album by I Am Arrows
- Released: 16 August 2010
- Recorded: Eastcote Studios, London
- Genres: Indie pop, Psychedelia
- Length: 43:22
- Label: Mercury
- Producer: Eliot James

Andy Burrows chronology
The Colour of My Dreams (2008)	Sun Comes Up Again (2010)	Company (2012)

Singles from Sun Comes Up Again
- 1. "Green Grass" Released: 5 August 2010

Professional ratings
Aggregate scores
Source	Rating
Metacritic	71/100
Review scores
Source	Rating
musicOMH	3/5 stars
NME	7/10
Drowned in Sound	(6/10)
Allmusic	3.5/5 stars

Sun Comes Up Again is the debut album by English indie rock band I Am Arrows, released in August 2010. The album was produced at Eastcote Studios in London, by Eliot James.

== Track listing ==
The track listing was confirmed by I Am Arrows front man Andy Burrows in May 2010.

No.	Title	Length
1.	"Nun"	3:00
2.	"Green Grass"	3:45
3.	"Nice Try"	3:04
4.	"Far Enough Away"	2:59
5.	"Monsters Dash"	0:59
6.	"No Wonder"	3:42
7.	"So Long Ago"	3:41
8.	"The Us"	3:16
9.	"Another Picture of You"	3:15
10.	"Hurricane"	2:58
11.	"Battle for Hearts & Minds"	3:59
12.	"Park Slopey"	3:25
13.	"Bruises"	3:36
14.	"You've Found Love"	1:43

iTunes Deluxe Version
No.	Title	Length
15.	"50 Feet High"	3:26
