= America (Razorlight song) =

2006 single by Razorlight

Single by Razorlight

from the album Razorlight
- B-side: "Down to the Coast" (demo); "Wilfred Owen" (demo); "Teenage Logic"; "Fine"
- Released: 2 October 2006
- Genre: Soft rock
- Length: 4:10
- Label: Mercury; Vertigo
- Songwriters: Johnny Borrell; Andy Burrows
- Producer: Chris Thomas

Razorlight singles chronology
| "In the Morning" (2006) | "America" (2006) | "Before I Fall to Pieces" (2006) |

Music video
- "America" on YouTube

"America" is a song by English indie rock band Razorlight, included as the fourth track on their self-titled second studio album (2006). It was written by Johnny Borrell and Andy Burrows (credited to Borrell, Burrows, and Razorlight) and was also released as the second single from that album on 2 October 2006.

The song garnered a negative reception from critics for its attempt at both political commentary and transatlantic crossover appeal. Nevertheless, "America" became the band's first and only number-one single in the United Kingdom and was the country's 17th-best-selling single of that year. The song also peaked within the top 10 in Ireland, the Netherlands and New Zealand.

== Critical reception ==
"America" received generally negative reviews from music critics, who found its attempt at serious commentary laughable and pretentious. Adam Zacharias of Drowned in Sound panned the song for cribbing the same lyrics from the previous single "In the Morning" and for coming off as trite commentary for the mass public, calling it "a terrible piece of faux-sentiment". Liz Colville of Stylus Magazine criticised the song's attempt at being a blue-collar anthem in the vein of Bruce Springsteen but without his particular musicianship. Michael Lomas of PopMatters called the song "soft rock hell".

John Murphy of MusicOMH was mixed towards the song, saying that it has the right amount of intimacy but found the lyrics "facile at best". Doug Kamin of ARTISTdirect praised Borrell's delivery of the song's overall message, saying that, "It's sung without judgment or criticism and could grab the ears of rock and pop lovers on both sides of the pond."

== Track listings ==
UK 7-inch single

A. "America"
B. "Down to the Coast" (demo)

UK limited-edition 7-inch single

A. "America"
B. "Wilfred Owen" (demo)

UK maxi-CD single

1. "America"
2. "Teenage Logic"
3. "Fine"

European CD single

1. "America"
2. "Teenage Logic"

== Charts ==
=== Weekly charts ===
| Chart (2006–2007) | Peak position |
|---|---|
| Austria (Ö3 Austria Top 40) | 17 |
| Belgium (Ultratop 50 Flanders) | 21 |
| Belgium (Ultratop 50 Wallonia) | 37 |
| Czech Republic Airplay (ČNS IFPI) | 45 |
| Europe (Eurochart Hot 100) | 7 |
| France (SNEP) | 22 |
| Germany (GfK) | 38 |
| Ireland (IRMA) | 6 |
| Netherlands (Dutch Top 40) | 9 |
| Netherlands (Single Top 100) | 23 |
| New Zealand (Recorded Music NZ) | 10 |
| Scottish Singles Sales (Official Charts) | 3 |
| Slovakia Airplay (ČNS IFPI) | 69 |
| Switzerland (Schweizer Hitparade) | 29 |
| UK Singles (Official Charts) | 1 |

=== Year-end charts ===
| Chart (2006) | Position |
|---|---|
| Europe (Eurochart Hot 100) | 88 |
| Netherlands (Dutch Top 40) | 67 |
| UK Singles (OCC) | 17 |

| Chart (2007) | Position |
|---|---|
| Europe (Eurochart Hot 100) | 100 |
| Switzerland (Schweizer Hitparade) | 99 |

== Certifications ==
| Region | Certification | Certified units/sales |
|---|---|---|
| New Zealand (RMNZ) | Gold | 15,000^{‡} |
| United Kingdom (BPI) | 2× Platinum | 1,200,000^{‡} |
^{‡} Sales+streaming figures based on certification alone.

== See also ==
- List of UK Singles Chart number ones of the 2000s
