= Olympus Sleeping =

Studio album by Razorlight
- Released: 26 October 2018
- Studios: Fish Factory, London
- Genres: Indie rock; post-punk revival
- Length: 36:23
- Labels: Atlantic Culture; Believe
- Producer: Tommaso Colliva

Razorlight chronology
Slipway Fires (2008)	Olympus Sleeping (2018)	Razorwhat? The Best of Razorlight (2022)

Olympus Sleeping is the fourth album by English rock band Razorlight, released on 26 October 2018. It marked the first Razorlight album for a decade and four years after Johnny Borrell disbanded the group. The album was written by Borrell, at that point the only original member of the band, along with guitarist David Ellis. Martin Chambers of The Pretenders played drums.

== Background ==
While announcing his new solo single My World, Your Life on 3 May 2018, Borrell also announced that a new Razorlight album would be released that year. The album was released on 26 October 2018, but prior to then four songs were released with promo videos, along with the announcement of a UK tour. Borrell stated that the album "was about embracing English indie guitar pop". The song Good Night was previously played live in 2013 prior to the hiatus with Kaplan receiving a songwriting credit.

The new line-up featured guitarist David Ellis (who co-wrote several of the songs on the album and also appeared on Borrell's solo single My World, Your Life), bassist Harry Deacon (formerly of Kid Wave) and drummer David Kaplan.

Although drummer David Kaplan appeared in press shots for the album and toured in support of it, the album was recorded with drummer Martin Chambers. Borrell met Chambers at a David A. Stewart birthday gig and asked him if he would like to play on the new album. Ellis and Borrell shared bass duties on the album.

Former Razorlight drummer Andy Burrows said of the album at the time: "I’ve heard a few songs from it. It sounds good. It’s got a lot of energy like the early stuff, which I know is something he [Johnny Borrell] wanted to recapture. I enjoyed it. Obviously he doesn’t speak to me so we have zero communication these days, but it’s great they’re back out on tour and giving it some."

== Track listing ==
1. "Got to Let the Good Times Back into Your Life" – 2:40
2. "Razorchild" – 3:01
3. "Brighton Pier" – 2:45
4. "Good Night" – 1:37
5. "Carry Yourself" – 3:53
6. "Japanrock" – 3:13
7. "Midsummer Girl" – 2:42
8. "Iceman" – 2:58
9. "Sorry?" – 3:07
10. "Olympus Sleeping" – 2:49
11. "No Answers" – 4:02
12. "City of Women" – 3:10

== Personnel ==
- Johnny Borrell – vocals, guitars, bass, keyboards, synthesisers and percussion
- David Ellis – guitars, backing vocals, bass, drums and mellotron
- Martin Chambers – drums

== Charts ==
Chart performance for Olympus Sleeping
Chart (2018)	Peak position
Scottish Albums (Official Charts)	36
UK Albums (Official Charts)	27
UK Independent Albums (Official Charts)	3
