= Slipway Fires =

Studio album by Razorlight
- Released: 3 November 2008
- Studios: Air Studios, Fish Factory Studios
- Genres: Indie rock; post-punk revival
- Length: 38:46
- Label: Mercury/Vertigo
- Producer: Mike Crossey

Razorlight chronology
Razorlight (2006)	Slipway Fires (2008)	Olympus Sleeping (2018)

Johnny Borrell chronology
Razorlight (2006)	Slipway Fires (2008)	Borrell 1 (2013)

Slipway Fires is the third album by English indie rock band Razorlight. It was released on 3 November 2008.

The first single from the album, "Wire to Wire", was released on 26 September 2008. It was premiered by Zane Lowe on BBC Radio 1 on 8 September 2008, and peaked at number 5 on the UK Singles Chart.

The second single taken from the album was "Hostage of Love", released on 12 January 2009.

== Reception ==
Professional ratings
Aggregate scores
Source	Rating
Metacritic	52/100
Review scores
Source	Rating
AllMusic	2.5/5 stars
The Austin Chronicle	2/5 stars
DIY	1.5/5 stars
Drowned in Sound	4/10
The Guardian	3/5 stars
MusicOMH	3/5 stars
NME	2/5 stars
Rolling Stone	2.5/5 stars
Slant Magazine	1.5/5 stars
Sputnikmusic	2/5 stars

Slipway Fires was met with "mixed or average" reviews from critics. At Metacritic, which assigns a weighted average rating out of 100 to reviews from mainstream publications, this release received an average score of 52 based on 15 reviews.

In a review for AllMusic, Andrew Leahey wrote: "Slipway Fires is Razorlight's most mainstream release to date, an album that downplays the band's garage-rock past for something akin to Snow Patrol's adult-approved pop. Enjoying Slipway Fires requires a suspension of disbelief, a conscious separation between the band's past and the (somewhat ludicrous) present." Drowned in Sound described it as "a headachey throb of over-production and excessive sentiment" and "about as indie as Margaret Thatcher", while the NME described them as "just a boringly competent indie band masquerading as, at best, Fleetwood Mac and, at worst, Whitesnake".

Writing for The Austin Chronicle, Raoul Hernandez explained: "Razorlight's Slipway Fires manages a glow even in low light. Between the two best tracks that bookend the UK quartet's third LP struggles an album slighter than the last, which was already thinner than the first."

== Track listing ==
Slipway Fires track listing
No.	Title	Writer(s)	Length
1.	"Wire to Wire"	Johnny Borrell	3:05
2.	"Hostage of Love"	Borrell; Andy Burrows	3:44
3.	"You and the Rest"	Borrell	3:25
4.	"Tabloid Lover"	Borrell	2:58
5.	"North London Trash"	Borrell	3:28
6.	"60 Thompson"	Borrell; Burrows	2:37
7.	"Stinger"	Borrell; Burrows	4:17
8.	"Burberry Blue Eyes"	Borrell; Burrows	3:33
9.	"Blood for Wild Blood"	Borrell	3:10
10.	"Monster Boots"	Borrell	4:34
11.	"The House"	Borrell	3:55

International digital version bonus track
No.	Title	Length
12.	"Where the Frequencies Run Deep and Wild"	3:07

iTunes bonus track
No.	Title	Length
12.	""Wire to Wire" (BBC Live Lounge)	2:54

== Personnel ==
- Johnny Borrell - vocals and guitar
- Björn Ågren - guitar
- Carl Dalemo - bass
- Andy Burrows - drums
- Produced, engineered and mixed by Mike Crossey
- Engineered by Antonio and Nick Cervonaro
- Assistant engineer: Adrian Breakspear
- Recorded at The Fish Factory and Air Studios, London
- Mixed at The Engine Room (Miloco Studios), London
- Mastered by Robin Schmidt at 24-96 Mastering
- Cover photography by Paul Rider, Johnny Photo and David Ellis
- Sleeve conceived by JB and Colly
- Art direction and design by Colly

== Charts ==
=== Weekly charts ===
Chart (2008)	Peak position
Austrian Albums (Ö3 Austria)	10
Belgian Albums (Ultratop Flanders)	23
Belgian Albums (Ultratop Wallonia)	94
Dutch Albums (Album Top 100)	88
French Albums (SNEP)	62
German Albums (Offizielle Top 100)	4
Irish Albums (IRMA)	8
Scottish Albums (Official Charts)	7
Swiss Albums (Schweizer Hitparade)	39
UK Albums (Official Charts)	4
US Billboard 200	23
US Heatseekers Albums (Billboard)	23

=== Year-end charts ===
Chart (2009)	Rank
German Albums (Offizielle Top 100)	36
