= Up All Night (Razorlight album) =

Studio album by Razorlight
- Released: 28 June 2004
- Studios: Sawmills, Cornwall and Sphere Studios, London, England
- Genres: Indie rock; post-punk revival
- Length: 45:49
- Labels: Mercury; Vertigo
- Producers: John Cornfield; Steve Lillywhite; Johnny Borrell

Razorlight chronology
Up All Night (2004)	Razorlight (2006)

Up All Night is the debut album by English indie rock band Razorlight, released on 28 June 2004. The album was mainly recorded at Sawmills Studio and mixed at Sphere Studios by John Cornfield.

The album garnered favourable reviews, but critics questioned the band's influence-filled musicianship throughout the tracks. Up All Night peaked at number 3 on the UK Albums Chart and spawned five singles: "Rock 'N' Roll Lies", "Rip It Up", "Stumble and Fall", "Golden Touch" and "Vice". In 2005, the album was re-released with the number 2 hit "Somewhere Else" as a bonus track.

Andy Burrows joined the band a month before Up All Night was released, replacing Christian Smith-Pancorvo who played drums on the album.

On 4 June 2014, the band, with only lead singer Johnny Borrell remaining from the line-up which recorded the album, played at the Electric Ballroom in Camden to mark Up All Night's 10th anniversary.

== Critical reception ==
Professional ratings
Aggregate scores
Source	Rating
Metacritic	65/100
Review scores
Source	Rating
AllMusic	3.5/5 stars
BBC	(positive)
Drowned in Sound	8/10
Entertainment Weekly	(positive)
The Guardian	3/5 stars
NME	8/10
Pitchfork	3.7/10
PopMatters	5/10
Rolling Stone	4/5 stars
Stylus Magazine	C

Up All Night received positive reviews but music critics were divided by the overall musicianship resembling that of bands both classic and contemporary. At Metacritic, which assigns a normalised rating out of 100 to mainstream critics, the album received an average score of 65 based on 16 reviews.

Tim Jonze of NME gave the album high praise for Johnny Borrell's sharp street poetry and the band's instrumentation for giving Borrell the right amount of strength and control to sing them, saying "For all its flaws, Up All Night bristles with passion, energy and, most importantly, amazing songs." Rob Sheffield of Rolling Stone praised Borrell for backing up his bravado with tracks that exude tight lyrics and optimism, saying that "Up All Night is a brilliant mod explosion of scruffy pub punk, in the mode of his old friends the Libertines." Dorian Lynskey of The Guardian said the album's various influence-filled tracks get by on Borrell being able to deliver them with gusto and conviction, concluding that "Originality may not be Razorlight's strong point, but Borrell's raw charisma carries the day." Richard Banks of BBC praised the band's commitment to delivering upbeat three-chord punk tracks while still being to able to make it wholly original, concluding that "With a debut this good, Razorlight are a band that deserve to do very, very well."

Mark Edwards of Stylus Magazine was mixed about the record, saying the band utilise the basic rock 'n' roll formula to craft catchy tracks but then sputter out in terms of inspiration to create nondescript material. He concluded with, "This is a good debut album—no more, no less. The second album could very well be as good as they think this one is. But they're going to have to wait a while before they get what they so desire." Alex Reicherter of PopMatters felt that a majority of the album's tracks utilising the hedonistic party tale formula work and any diversions from it fall flat, saying "though they lack the rapid-fire consistency of their predecessors, they've put together a likable, if completely unoriginal rock record that's sure to get even the dullest of parties onto the police blotter." Nick Sylvester of Pitchfork found the album's instrumentation and lyrics derivative of The Strokes and Television, and criticised Borrell's vocal delivery for impersonating said bands' frontmen with no passion, concluding that "Razorlight refuse to meet their influences with anything more than half hugs and limp handshakes, butchering the bits they brazenly borrow, and taking rock 'n' roll apathy to formerly unbelievable lengths."

== Track listing ==
All lyrics are written by Johnny Borrell, unless otherwise noted; all music is composed by Razorlight.

No.	Title	Writer(s)	Length
1.	"Leave Me Alone"		3:50
2.	"Rock 'N' Roll Lies"	Borrell, John Fortis	3:08
3.	"Vice"		3:14
4.	"Up All Night"		4:03
5.	"Which Way Is Out"		3:18
6.	"Rip It Up"		2:25
7.	"Don't Go Back to Dalston"		2:59
8.	"Golden Touch"		3:25
9.	"Stumble and Fall"	Borrell, Björn Ågren	3:02
10.	"Get It and Go" (Omitted from US/Europe release)		3:22
11.	"In the City"		4:50
12.	"To the Sea"	Borrell, Ågren	5:31
13.	"Fall, Fall, Fall"		2:42
14.	"Somewhere Else" (Bonus track on 2005 re-release)		3:16

== Personnel ==
- Johnny Borrell - vocals and guitar
- Björn Ågren - guitar
- Carl Dalemo - bass
- Christian Smith-Pancorvo - drums
- Andy Burrows - drums on "Somewhere Else" (2005 re-release)

== Singles ==
1. "Rock 'N' Roll Lies" (18 August 2003)
2. "Rip It Up" (10 November 2003)
3. "Stumble and Fall" (26 January 2004)
4. "Golden Touch" (14 June 2004)
5. "Vice" (13 September 2004)
  - "Rip It Up" was re-released on 29 November 2004 as the last single from the album's initial release.
6. "Somewhere Else" (11 April 2005)
  - The bonus track on the 2005 re-release.

== Charts and certifications ==
=== Weekly charts ===
Chart (2004)	Peak position
Irish Albums (IRMA)	22
UK Albums (Official Charts)	3

=== Year-end charts ===
Chart (2004)	Position
UK Albums (OCC)	45
Chart (2005)	Position
UK Albums (OCC)	51
Chart (2006)	Position
UK Albums (OCC)	156

=== Certifications ===
Region	Certification	Certified units/sales
United Kingdom (BPI)	4× Platinum	1,200,000^{^}
^{^} Shipments figures based on certification alone.

== Release history ==
Country	Date	Label	Format	Catalog
Japan	9 June 2004	Universal International	CD	UICR-1032
United Kingdom	28 June 2004	Vertigo	LP	6 02498 67101 6
United Kingdom	28 June 2004	Vertigo	CD	6 02498 66804 7
United Kingdom	18 April 2005	Mercury	CD / bonus track	6 02498 71043 2
United States	26 October 2004	Mercury, Universal	CD	B0003362-02 / 6 02498 67156 6
United States	17 May 2005	Mercury, Universal	CD / bonus track	B0004788-02 / 6 02498 71460 7
