= Rip It Up (Razorlight song) =

2003 single by Razorlight

Single by Razorlight

from the album Up All Night
- Released: 10 November 2003
- Genre: Post-punk revival
- Length: 2:25
- Label: Vertigo
- Songwriter: Johnny Borrell
- Producer: John Cornfield

Razorlight singles chronology
"Rock 'N' Roll Lies" (2003)	"Rip It Up" (2003)	"Stumble and Fall" (2004)

"Rip It Up" is a song by English indie rock band Razorlight, included as the sixth track on their 2004 debut album, Up All Night. A version of the song was released as their second single in November 2003 and peaked at number 42 on the UK Singles Chart. A year later, on 29 November 2004, a re-recorded version of the song from sessions at Sawmills Studio in Cornwall was released as the final single from the initial release of Up All Night and peaked at number 20 on the UK Singles Chart.

The song is featured in series 2, episode 1 of British sitcom The Inbetweeners.

== Track listings ==
=== Initial release ===
- 7-inch
1. "Rip It Up"
2. "Here It Comes"
- CD1
1. "Rip It Up"
2. "Spirit"
3. "Yes, You Should Know"
- CD2
1. "Rip It Up"
2. "When He Was Twenty"
3. "Heartbreak Soup"

=== Re-release ===
- 7-inch
1. "Rip It Up"
2. "Don't Go Back to Dalston" (Live from Brixton Academy)
- CD1
1. "Rip It Up"
2. "Just Can't Explain"
- CD2
1. "Rip It Up"
2. "Fairytale of New York" (The Lamacq Session)
3. "Stumble and Fall" (Live at One Big Weekend, Birmingham)

== Charts ==
Chart (2003)	Peak position
UK Singles Chart	42
Chart (2004)	Peak position
UK Singles Chart ^{1}	20

^{1} Re-release
