= Razorlight =

English indie rock band

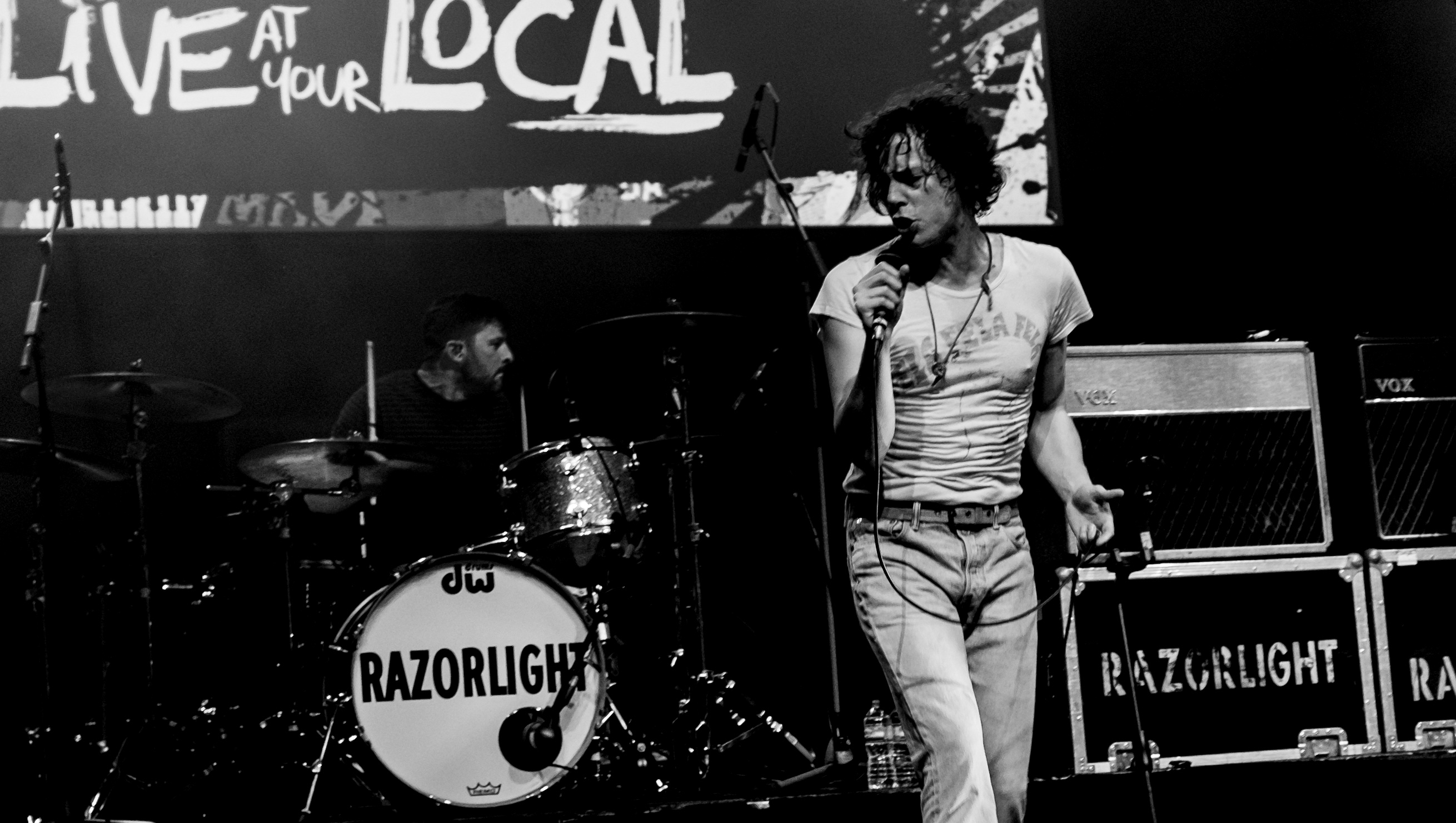
- Razorlight in 2017

Background information
- Origin: London, England
- Genres: Indie rock, garage rock, post-punk revival
- Years active: 2002–2014, 2017–present
- Labels: Atlantic Culture, Mercury/Vertigo
- Members: Johnny Borrell; Björn Ågren; Carl Dalemo; Andy Burrows; Reni Lane
- Past members: Freddie Stitz; Gus Robertson; João Mello; David Sullivan Kaplan; David Ellis; Harry Deacon; Ben Ellis; Mat Hector; Shïan Smith-Pancorvo
- Website: razorlightofficial.com

Razorlight are an English indie rock band, formed in 2002 in London by lead singer and guitarist Johnny Borrell. Along with Borrell, the current line-up of the band is composed of founding members Björn Ågren on guitar and bassist Carl Dalemo, as well as drummer Andy Burrows. This lineup is a reunion of the lineup from the band's second and third albums.

The band have gone through several line-up changes, with Borrell remaining the sole permanent member. They released three studio albums before splitting up in 2014. The band reformed in 2017 and released the album Olympus Sleeping in 2018.

They are best known for the singles "Golden Touch", "Somewhere Else" and "In the Morning", and the 2006 UK No 1 single "America".

== History ==
=== Formation and early years (2002–2003) ===
The band was formed in 2002 by Johnny Borrell, after having performed across London with the likes of The Libertines as a solo acoustic singer-songwriter. It is often reported that Borrell was a member of the Libertines, but Carl Barat has since revealed that he was just taught the bass lines for four songs to play for a showcase for Rough Trade Records, failed to turn up for it and never played with the band live. Borrell first enlisted Swedish-born guitarist Björn Ågren via an advert in the NME, who then introduced fellow-Swede bassist Carl Dalemo to Borrell. They rehearsed in east London for six months before playing their first gig on 17 September 2002 at Dingwalls in Camden, London supporting the Von Bondies. Former NME journalist Roger Morton, who had been managing the band from the beginning, began looking to get the band into a recording studio and a session was booked at Liam Watson's Toe Rag Studios to record early versions of the tracks Rip It Up, Rock 'n' Roll Lies and In the City. The results of these sessions gained radio play on the John Kennedy Show on XFM who described the band as being "the best unsigned band in Britain", and led to A&R attention. Following a bidding war to sign the band, they signed to Mercury Records.

=== Up All Night (2004–2005) ===
The band released their debut album Up All Night on 28 June 2004, reaching number 3 in the UK album charts. The critical reception was generally positive, receiving good reviews from NME, Q magazine and Billboard. Drummer Shïan Smith-Pancorvo left the band in April and was replaced by Andy Burrows the following month. Up All Night was re-issued in April 2005, including the stand-alone single Somewhere Else as a bonus track, and peaked at Number 2.

In July 2005, the band performed at Hyde Park, London as part of the Live 8 series of concerts. However, the band came under fire for being the only band to not donate their extra revenue to charity. The band subsequently claimed that due to their "fledgling status", they were unable to make such a commitment.

Razorlight contributed the song "Kirby's House" to the War Child charity album Help!: A Day in the Life. A shorter alternative version of the song was included on the band's second album, Razorlight.

In the midst of their first American headlining tour in support of Up All Night, Razorlight created a stir in Denver, Colorado, when they stormed off stage five songs into their set during a show at the Larimer Lounge. After stumbling around stage, frontman Borrell shouted into the microphone "I'm going to kill myself now," and ran off the stage. The band's official statement stated that he was suffering from stagefright.

A later laryngitis infection led to the cancellation of the Los Angeles date of the tour.

=== Razorlight (2006–2007) ===
Razorlight debuted several new songs from their forthcoming second album live on 30 March 2006 at the Albert Hall in London, as part of Teenage Cancer Trust concerts, organised by Roger Daltrey. On 2 July, they played to a sold-out Hyde Park Calling, where they performed before The Who. The band went on to play on the beach opposite Brighton's West Pier on 12 July in a free concert as part of a Vodafone TBA event broadcast on Channel 4.

Razorlight released their second album Razorlight on 17 July 2006, in the United Kingdom and it debuted at No. 1 in the UK Albums Chart a week later. It received mixed reviews, Q magazine giving it a 5/5 rating, whilst Pitchfork Media gave it 2.8/10. The lead single from the album, In the Morning was released as a single on 3 July 2006, which peaked at No. 3 in the UK Singles Chart. To date, it is their third biggest single after Somewhere Else, which peaked at No. 2, and America, which peaked at No. 1. It also reached No. 2 on iTunes. In 2007, Razorlight were nominated for two BRIT Awards – one for Best British Band and the other for Best Song, America. They were also nominated for two NME Brit Awards for Best Band and Best Album.

Razorlight supported Queen + Paul Rodgers on 15 July, in front of 60,000 people. This gig had been rescheduled following the July 2005 London bombings. In December of the same year, they supported Oasis, at Cardiff's Millennium Stadium. They also supported The Rolling Stones in Cologne and Paris. The band played their biggest tour to date in October–November 2006 and also supported Richard Ashcroft at the Lancashire County Cricket Club on 17 June. They headlined Reading on 24 August, and Leeds on 25 August 2007. They also played the Main Stage on 19 May in Preston for Radio 1's Big Weekend alongside bands such as Kasabian and Kaiser Chiefs. On 7 July 2007, Razorlight performed at both the UK leg of Live Earth at Wembley Stadium, London and T in the Park. In November 2006 the band travelled on a plane that may have been radioactively contaminated after being used by Russian ex-spy Alexander Litvinenko, but were given the "all clear". The same month they supported the Mando Diao "Ode to Ochrasy Tour" in Germany.

=== Slipway Fires and Burrows' departure (2008–2009) ===
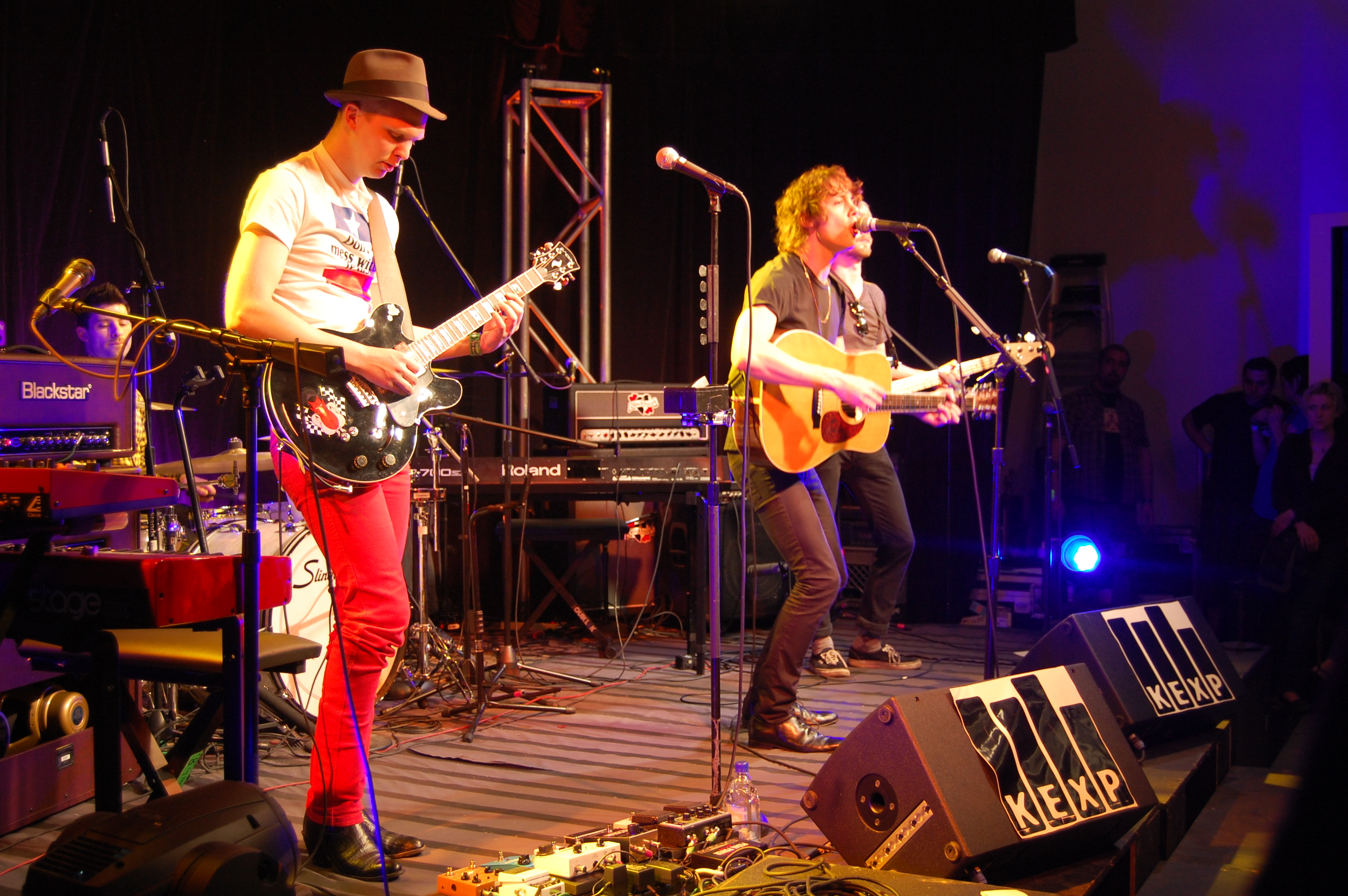
Razorlight in 2009

Razorlight were due to perform for BBC Children in Need 2008, but were forced to cancel due to Borrell suffering with vocal problems. The band made a donation to the charity. After months of working on new material, some of which was written by Borrell on the island of Tiree in the Inner Hebrides, Razorlight released their third studio album, Slipway Fires, on 3 November 2008 with the lead single, "Wire to Wire", released on 20 October 2008. The second single from the album, "Hostage of Love", however, received little commercial attention and failed to enter the charts. As a result, a planned third single Burberry Blue Eyes was cancelled. Borrell later stated that the album was their weakest, and that the "album was just about greed – that's the only way I see that record". He added that after writing songs in the Inner Hebrides "I came back to London and the label had already booked studio time even though I wasn't really confident in the songs. The songs I wrote came from this place of total mental breakdown and they were shoe-horned into a pop album, which just didn't work. I was very conscious that I didn't tell anyone in the band what I thought about their part of a song, because I couldn't face the consequences of saying that and the tantrums that would ensue".

On 5 March 2009, it was announced that Andy Burrows had quit the band to "pursue other musical ventures". Johnny Borrell stated that although "over the last two albums and five years Andy has been an integral part of Razorlight and we will miss him", the band would continue. Burrows initially claimed that his time with the band had been "an amazing experience", but later went on to state that he "hated being in the band. Johnny and I didn't get on. Now I've got my freedom. He never wanted people to know that we both wrote songs". A well publicised fight between Borrell and Burrows occurred in 2006 at the Hawley Arms in Camden, London over songwriting credits for the song America with it being reported that Burrows was the main songwriter of the song. In 2019, Burrows revealed that he had bumped into Borrell in central London three years prior and was "brushed off". He stated that Borrell "acted like I was a stranger, it was the weirdest thing. I think I went off and got extremely drunk, but felt very weird for a couple of days… it was almost like seeing a ghost". In 2016, Borrell admitted that the band were collaborative and that Burrows had helped shape the sound of the second album, stating that "I rate the drummer Andy Burrows. He was a great drummer with a melodic ear – but if you want to figure out who was taking Razorlight in which direction, then maybe have a listen to what we're each doing now. I'm playing psychedelic blues-tango, and his stuff is so middle of the road it's got more white lines than Liam Gallagher in 1997".

Following Burrows' departure, the band enlisted David 'Skully' Sullivan Kaplan as a temporary replacement to fulfil live commitments, and soon became an official member. He had previously worked for the band's booking agent. With a top 5 album and single in Germany, the band toured America, Australia and Europe before returning to the UK for shows in May at The O2 and Manchester Evening News Arena followed by UK festivals. Towards the end of the album tour cycle, the band previewed the new song Dr. Boushitan at several German gigs.

=== Aborted fourth album, Dalemo and Ågren's departure and hiatus (2009–2019) ===
In December 2009, Borrell revealed that the band were working with Steve Lillywhite and Dave McCracken on a new album and that they were eager to get the new songs out "soon". However, a UK and Europe tour of December 2010 featured an unannounced new band line-up. The band previewed several new tracks on tour, including Vertical Women and If It Bleeds.

On 26 January 2011 it was officially announced that Dalemo and Ågren had left the band, having "agreed on an amicable parting following unproductive early recording sessions for a new album late last year". The duo were replaced by guitarist Gus Robertson and bassist Freddie Stitz The new line-up was officially revealed on 26 January 2011 via a new press photo. The photo was widely mocked on social media. Borrell responded that "if people were laughing, then good! You shouldn't change what people ridicule you for, because in reality it's your strength".

The new line-up of the band, with Borrell as the only original member, toured the UK and Europe in September and October 2011. The band played several festivals including Get Loaded in the Park on Clapham Common on Sunday 12 June, Guilfest on 16 July 2011 and Shakedown Festival in Brighton on 17 September 2011. The band also headlined OsFest in Shropshire on 3 June 2012, Splendour Festival in Nottingham on 21 July 2012, Bingley Music Live on 1 September 2012 and The Big Feastival the next day on 2 September 2012.

In May 2011, Borrell revealed that the new band line-up were continuing work on the fourth album, and that they were "really gelling as a band and a group of people and we're really enjoying working together. There's a really good atmosphere, it feels great, really, really good. There are some songs coming together. But it'll be ready when it's ready". The band were set to work with either former Suede guitarist Bernard Butler or Steve Lillywhite producing. In October 2012, Kaplan confirmed that they had completed the album and were waiting to mix it. He revealed further song titles, Good To Be Dead, Boys and Reveal Yourself.

However, on 27 March 2013, Borrell announced that Razorlight was to be put on hold whilst he prepared to release solo material. Borrell later revealed that Mercury refused to release the album, stating that the band "really felt we had a record that we wanted to put out, but my label was very fractured and it was very hard to communicate with them. The label was focused on having a super-mega hit".

In July 2013, he released his debut solo album Borrell 1 via Stiff Records. The album sold poorly, with the record label releasing a statement poking fun at the fact that it sold only 594 copies in its first week of release. When questioned about the statement, Borrell responded that he "had almost no knowledge of that statement and I'm not sure who put it out or even what it said. My manager told me that it was really weird and, yeah, it was really weird" and that "labels are scum".

Following the commercial failure of the solo album and despite the hiatus announced the previous year, Razorlight began playing numerous festival through 2014 and 2015, such as Y Not Festival, Tartan Heart Festival, Festival Internacional de Benicàssim and Volksfest in Plymouth. On 4 June 2014 at the Electric Ballroom in Camden, Razorlight played on the tenth anniversary of their debut album. João Mello, an 18-year-old Brazilian who played saxophone on Borrell's solo project, played bass.

=== Olympus Sleeping and return of Ågren (2018–2019) ===
While announcing his solo single "My World, Your Life" on 3 May 2018, Borrell also announced that a new Razorlight album would be released that year. The album was released on 26 October, titled Olympus Sleeping. Four songs were immediately released with promo videos, along with the announcement of a UK tour. Borrell stated that the album "was about embracing English indie guitar pop". The song Good Night was previously played live in 2013 prior to the hiatus with Kaplan receiving a songwriting credit.

The new line-up featured guitarist David Ellis (who co-wrote several of the songs on the album and also appeared on Borrell's solo single My World, Your Life), bassist Harry Deacon (formerly of Kid Wave) and drummer David Kaplan.

Although drummer David Kaplan appeared in press shots for the album and toured in support of it, the album was recorded with drummer Martin Chambers. Borrell met Chambers at a David A. Stewart birthday gig and asked him if he'd like to play on the new album. Ellis and Borrell shared bass duties on the album. Kaplan left the band sometime in mid-2019. In July 2019, the band released the stand-alone single Cops & Robbers, which featured Borrell on drums.

In November 2019, it was announced that original guitarist Björn Ågren had rejoined the band and would be taking part in the December 2019 tour. The duo were joined by keyboardist Reni Lane, bassist Ben Ellis and drummer Mat Hector. Ellis and Deacon left the band sometime prior to the tour. In 2020, the band released the single "Burn, Camden, Burn", which was recorded in 2009. It features on the Apple TV series Trying.

=== Return of Burrows and Dalemo, Planet Nowhere ===
In April 2021, the band announced the return of the original lineup, featuring Borrell and Ågren, as well as Andy Burrows and Carl Dalemo with a livestreamed concert to be held on 2 June 2021. This marked the first appearance of the classic lineup in over a decade.

In an August 2021 interview, Carl Dalemo told local Swedish newspaper Nya Lidköpings-Tidningen that the band had been working on new music since April. Dalemo added that with him living in Sweden, and COVID-19 complicating travel, he was not able to make it to some of the gigs during early summer. With the reformed lineup, Razorlight released a greatest hits album with two newly-recorded tracks in 2022 and underwent a UK tour in spring 2023, culminating with a show at Hammersmith Odeon in London. The show was relocated from Brixton Academy after the venue was closed due to the fatal concert crush in December.

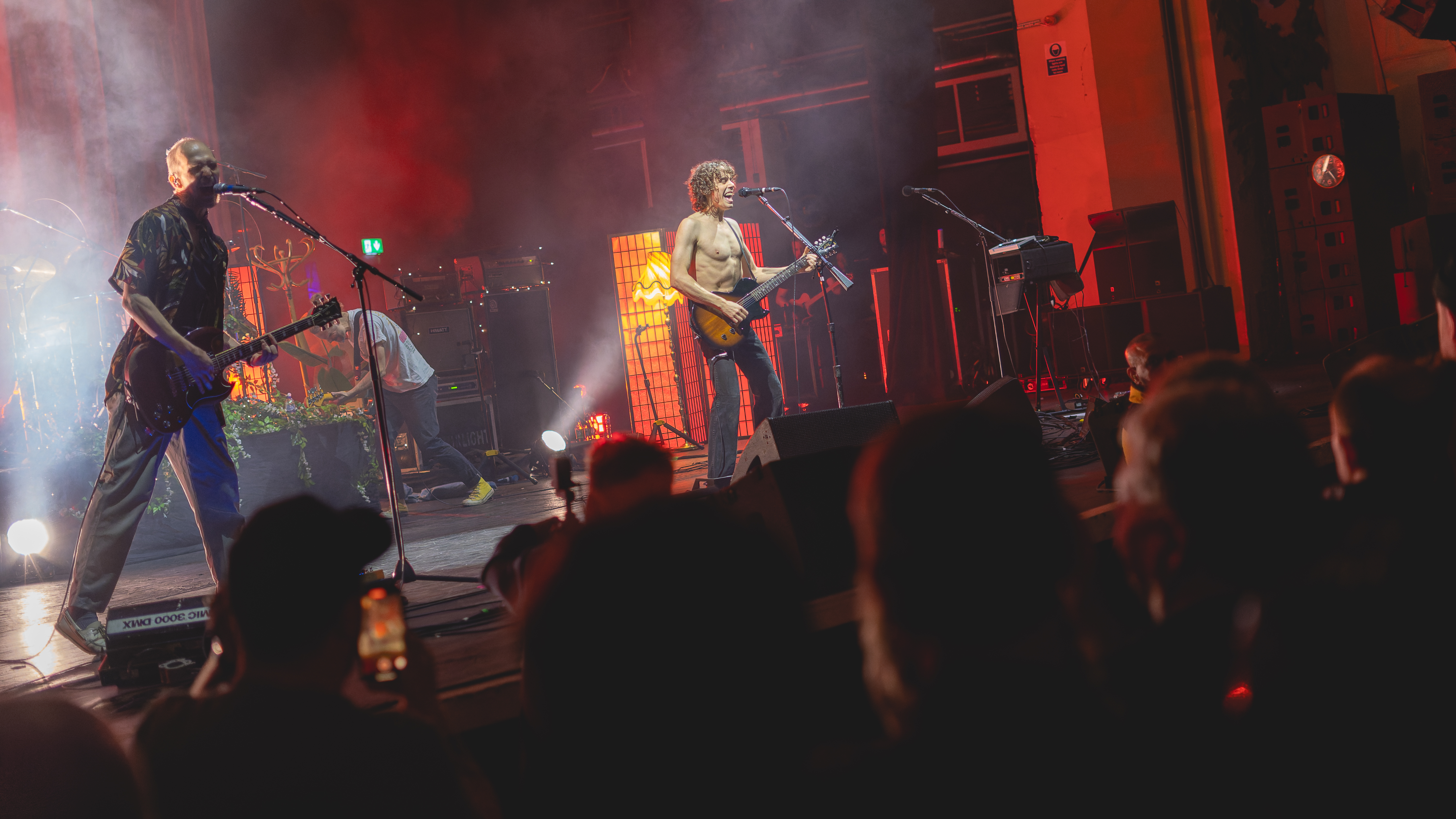
Razorlight at the O2 Academy Brixton in 2024

In July 2024, Razorlight announced their fifth album Planet Nowhere, which was released on 25 October. In November 2024, the reformed band played a 20th anniversary show for Up All Night at Brixton Academy.

== Awards and nominations ==
Award	Year	Category	Nominee(s)	Result	Ref.
Brit Awards	2007	British Group	Themselves	Nominated	
Brit Awards	2007	British Single of the Year	"America"	Nominated	
Eska Music Awards	2007	Best Rock Band	Themselves	Won	
Muso Awards	2005	Best Album	Up All Night	Won	
Muso Awards	2005	Best Drummer	Andy Burrows	Won	
NME Awards	2005	Best New Band	Themselves	Won	
NME Awards	2005	Best Live Band	Themselves	Nominated	
NME Awards	2005	Best Track	"Golden Touch"	Nominated	
NME Awards	2007	Worst Band	Themselves	Nominated	
NME Awards	2007	Worst Album	Razorlight	Nominated	
NME Awards	2009	Worst Album	Slipway Fires	Nominated	
Silver Clef Awards	2005	Best Newcomer	Themselves	Won	

== Band members ==
Current

- Johnny Borrell – lead vocals, guitar, keyboards (2002–present)
- Björn Ågren – guitars, keyboards, percussion (2002–2010, 2019–present)
- Carl Dalemo – bass, keyboards (2002–2010, 2021–present)
- Andy Burrows – drums, backing vocals (2004–2009, 2021–present)
- Reni Lane – keyboards (2019–present)

Former

- Shïan Smith-Pancorvo – drums (2002–2004)
- Freddie Stitz – bass (2010–2014)
- Gus Robertson – guitar (2010–2017)
- João Mello – bass (2014–2018)
- David Sullivan Kaplan – drums (2009–2018)
- David Ellis – guitars, backing vocals (2017–2019)
- Harry Deacon – bass (2018–2019)
- Ben Ellis – bass (2019–2021)
- Mat Hector – drums (2019–2021)

== Discography ==
Studio albums

- Up All Night (2004)
- Razorlight (2006)
- Slipway Fires (2008)
- Olympus Sleeping (2018)
- Planet Nowhere (2024)
