= Johnny Borrell =

English musician (born 1980)

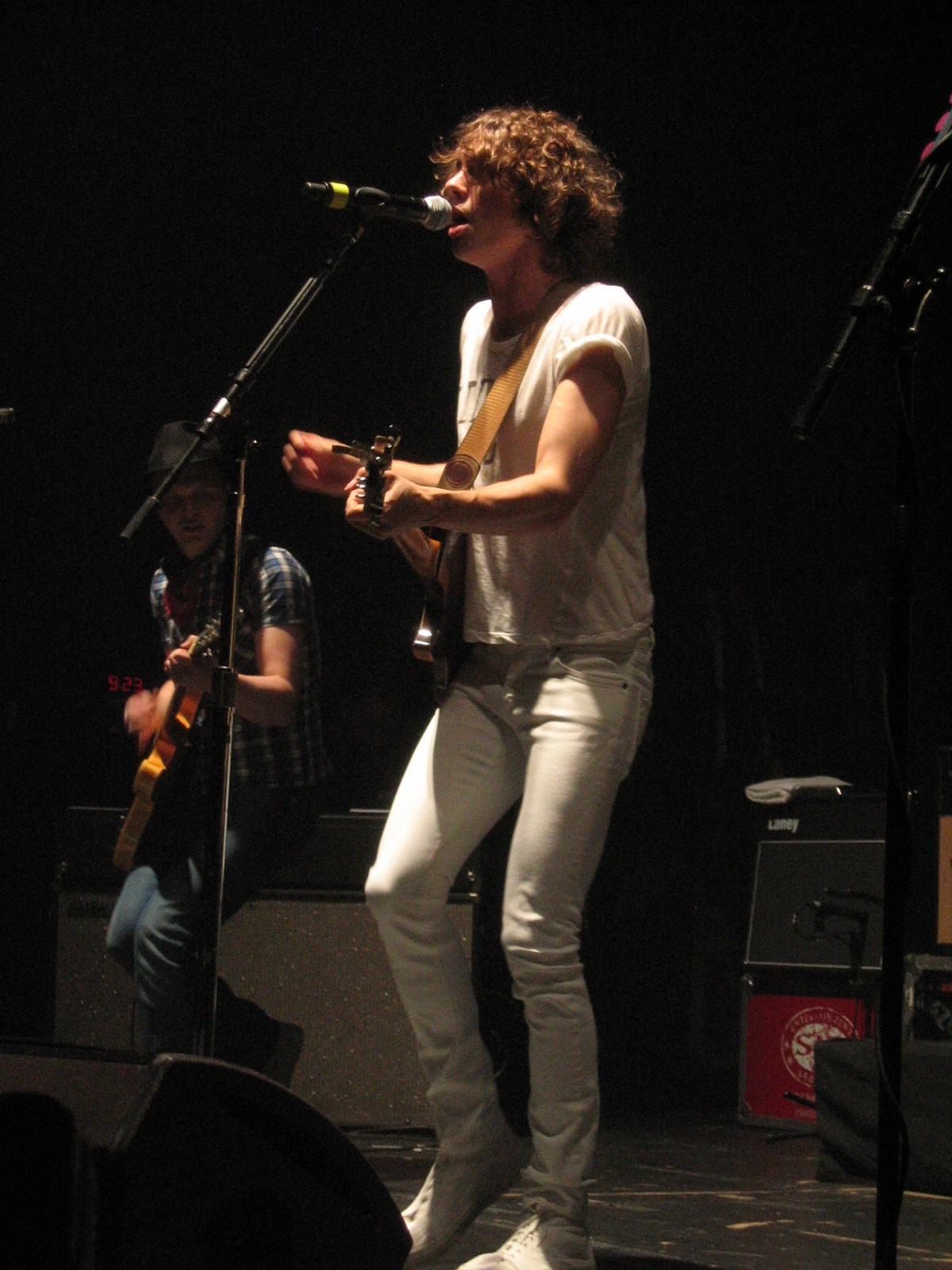

Background information
- Born: Jonathan Edward Borrell; 4 April 1980 (age 46); Sutton, London, England
- Genre: Indie rock
- Occupation: Musician
- Instruments: Guitar, vocals
- Years active: 1997–present
- Member of: Razorlight

Jonathan Edward Borrell (born 4 April 1980) is an English guitarist and singer, currently the frontman of the rock band Razorlight, of which he is the only consistent original member.

== Early life and career ==
Borrell was born in Sutton, London. His father, New Zealand-born John Borrell, was a war correspondent; his mother was a primary school teacher in Tottenham. His parents divorced when he was young. Borrell lived in Highgate, where he attended Highgate School. He moved to Camden School for Girls for sixth form.

Borrell was involved in music and the Camden scene while still at school. At 17 he played bass guitar in a band called Violet alongside dubstep pioneer Scuba, who regularly played gigs on the Camden circuit. The band recorded an EP and started to gain some recognition before splitting acrimoniously live on stage at Dublin Castle in late 1997. The title track of the EP was subsequently used in the soundtrack of the 1998 Michael Winterbottom film I Want You. After the split, Borrell briefly switched to being a solo artist, covering the Clash and Lead Belly songs. Many of these shows were played with close friends the Libertines.

Through his friendship with schoolmate John Hassall at Highgate School, Borrell was involved in the early formation of the Libertines. He was present at the sessions for their debut album Up the Bracket and appears as a character in songs, notably "Boy Looked at Johnny" and "Death on the Stairs", and also "What a Waster" which appeared as a bonus track on the album in Japan.

In 2002 he went on to form his own band which played house parties, rehearsing at a Hackney warehouse called Unit 13, comprising Carl Dalemo, Shïan Smith-Pancorvo (later replaced by Andy Burrows) and Björn Ågren. The band were watching a video recording of themselves playing a gig and misheard the ending refrain 'Its alright, it's alright' from the song "In The City" as 'razor-light, razor-light' which was then chosen as the band name. In early 2003 XFM DJ John Kennedy began to play the band's demos, recorded at Toerag Studios in east London with producers Liam Watson and John Fortis. Razorlight signed to Mercury Records on 23 May 2003 after the Universal label fought off bids from Sony.

After the number 8 single "Golden Touch", their debut album, Up All Night, was released on 28 June 2004, and charted at number 3 in the UK. The critical reception was generally good, receiving good reviews from NME ("Razorlight's debut packs more tunes than Franz [Ferdinand], more spirit than The Strokes and more balls than nearly every band out there right now."), Q magazine, Billboard and Rolling Stone who said "Razorlight's debut is a masterpiece. [Borrell]'s got the golden rock-star mop, the London sneer and a band full of crazy Swedes. But fortunately, he's also got the tunes."

Michael Parkinson saw coverage of the band performing at Glastonbury Festival and invited them onto his TV show. Razorlight performed "Golden Touch" with a gospel choir in front of the Parkinson studio audience and guest Tom Cruise. After 2004's constant touring Borrell was placed at No. 4 in NME's Cool List and Razorlight won Best New Act at 2004's Q Awards and the Best New Band category at the NME Awards in February 2005. French fashion brand Dior's creative director Hedi Slimane based his 2005 Autumn/Winter collection on Borrell and Pete Doherty and chose Razorlight to write music for the Paris show.

In the Spring of 2005 Razorlight played two sold-out shows at London's Alexandra Palace with Noel Fielding from The Mighty Boosh as their support act. Meanwhile, in between-album's single "Somewhere Else" reached number 2 in the UK charts. Q Magazine called it: "A punk rock symphony, a thrilling change in direction", and high-profile support slots with U2, Queen, The Who and Oasis and the band's appearance at Live 8 kept Razorlight occupied through the rest of the year prior to entering the studio for their second album in early 2006.

The self-titled follow up was produced by Pretenders, Sex Pistols and Roxy Music producer Chris Thomas. Their first single "In The Morning" went to number 3, and when the album was released on 17 July 2006 it gave the band their first number 1 in the UK album chart. The NME gave the album 8/10 and said: "A soulful romantic album that sees Razorlight comfortably leap the 'difficult second album' trap" whilst The Observer Music Monthly gave it 4/5 saying "[Borrell's] band's second album justifies the self-belief." Q Magazine called it "The best guitar album since Oasis's Definitely Maybe".

2006 saw Borrell and the band grow into an arena act and extend their international reach. Second single 'America' went straight to number 1 in the UK on 14 October dominating UK radio charts to the end of the year, and climbing airplay and singles charts in Ireland, the Netherlands, France, Denmark, Germany, New Zealand, Australia, Japan and America. The Rolling Stones asked the band to support them in Europe. An autumn UK arena tour culminated in a sold out Wembley Arena show and tours of Japan, Europe and the US led into a second UK arena tour and a sold-out show at London's 17,000 capacity Earl's Court in April 2007. Razorlight were the only UK band to headline the main stage at Reading Festival in August 2007. The Razorlight singer next emerged in October, duetting with the Kinks' Ray Davies on "Sunny Afternoon" for the BBC Electric Proms at the Roundhouse.

In late 2007 Borrell secluded himself on a remote Scottish island in the Outer Hebrides to begin writing for the band's third album. 2008's London sessions at Air Studios lead to a more contemplative third album titled Slipway Fires. The album went to number 4 in the UK album charts in November 2008 and first single "Wire to Wire" got to number 5. Press reaction to the record was mixed although Q's Paul Rees gave the record 4/5 and said: "Borrell and his band come up triumphant. It does what third albums traditionally used to do, which is to say, have the confidence the leap into the previously unknown, and for that, all credit to Borrell".

In Germany, "Wire to Wire" was the sixth biggest chart hit of 2009 and the album went gold. Two round the world tours, including first visits to Australia, a move to a new label, Mercury Records/Island Def Jam and major festival appearances in the UK and across Europe took Razorlight to the end of the decade, finishing with a December headline at XFM's Brixton Academy Christmas show where they donated their fee to Borrell's charity of choice, Anno's Africa.

December 2009 also saw the digital release of a documentary on Razorlight made by UK film director Charles Henri-Belleville. Titled Rock'n'Roll Lies, the 70-minute film follows the band on a week of UK shows intercut with band member interviews about Razorlight's history. The film also features bonus material including Borrell's charity hovercraft crossing of the English Channel and drummer Andy Burrows' trials and tribulations whilst giving up smoking while on tour.

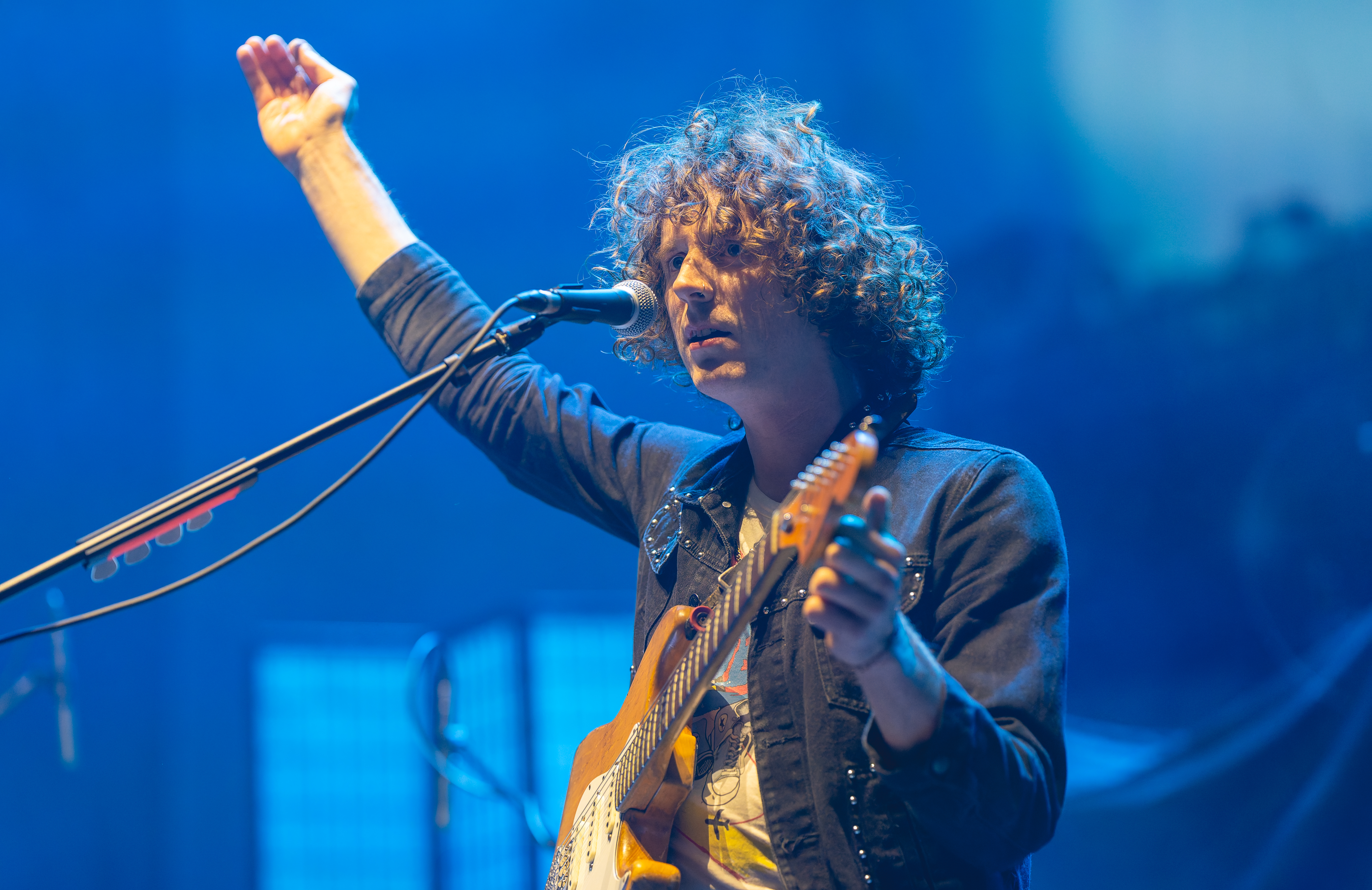
Borrell performing with Razorlight at the O2 Academy Brixton in 2024

== Solo work ==
Borrell's debut solo album, Borrell 1, was released in July 2013 in the UK. It was produced by Trevor Horn and received mixed reviews from critics. At Metacritic, which assigns a rating out of 100, the album received an average score of 46, based on 9 reviews by mainstream critics.

The album was a commercial failure, selling 594 copies in its first week on sale and failed to secure a position in the UK Albums Chart.

== Reputation and charity work ==
Borrell has sometimes been regarded as having a very arrogant attitude towards the press and is famous for his proclamations of his own abilities such as claiming he thinks he's the greatest songwriter in the world on MTV's Gonzo hosted by Zane Lowe. However, like many other artists who come across negatively in NME interviews, Borrell and supporters have accused the magazine of misrepresentation and emphasising quotes out of context.

Borrell has made numerous contributions to charity. Razorlight recorded 'Kirby's House' for the 2005 Warchild album and played London, Royal Albert Hall shows in 2006 and 2008 for The Who's Teenage Cancer Trust events (in 2008 the band performed 'Summertime Blues' with Roger Daltrey). In 2006 Borrell started to work for Friends of the Earth's climate change campaign 'The Big Ask', a relationship which has continued through 2006's show in Trafalgar Square for the 'icount' campaign to playing at FOE's November 2009 Hammersmith Apollo fundraiser. Razorlight were deemed to be one of the highlights of 2 July 2005 Live 8 charity concert in Hyde Park and continued to support Borrell's global warming concerns by taking part on 7 July 2007 Live Earth event at Wembley Stadium. Borrell is one of few amongst his contemporary generation of stars to have appeared on the cover of a national UK newspaper because of his political views. On 4 November 2006 his essay on climate change was the front cover story of The Independent. Razorlight have also regularly supported Nelson Mandela's 46664 Aids charity. In July 2005 the band flew to Tromso, Norway to play a 46664 fundraiser. Mandela invited Razorlight to perform at his 1 December 2007 World Aids day concert in Johannesburg, which allowed the band to visit township AIDs projects. Borrell also worked with environmentally friendly charity Global Cool on their 2007 green campaigns.

They also played at Mandela's July 2008 90th birthday celebration fundraiser in Hyde Park. Through his love of cricket (he appeared on the cover of Time Out's cricket edition in August 2005 holding a cricket ball) Borrell has become friends with some of the English cricket team including former captain Andrew Flintoff who asked Razorlight to play at the inaugural night of his charity, The Andrew Flintoff Foundation (of which Borrell is a patron) in July 2009 at London's The Hurlingham Club. Borrell also played charity shows for Nordoff Robbins, and Save The Children in the latter part of 2009 and in September duetted on 'Je Suis Venue Te Dire Que Je M'en Vais' with legendary singer Jane Birkin as part of a fundraiser for Kenyan children's charity Anno's Africa.

== Borrell and The Libertines ==
Borrell is one of "The Dalston Set", a clique of indie notables connected to the early days of The Libertines, along with Dominic Masters of The Others, Pete Doherty, Carl Barât, John Hassall, and the Queens of Noize. It has been reported that he was briefly a stand-in bassist for The Libertines before they were signed, but in recent interviews he has claimed that this is not true; however, in Pete Welsh's Kids in the Riot, it is alleged that Borrell was sacked as The Libertines' bassist for unreliable behaviour. In general though there is little animosity between the two bands, and Borrell remains friends with Carl Barât. The Libertines' song "The Boy Looked at Johnny" is reputedly about Borrell, and Razorlight's "Don't Go Back To Dalston" is reputedly directed at Pete Doherty, telling him to curtail his drug habit.

== Xfm ==
Following his four-week residency on London radio broadcaster Xfm, Borrell joined the station for a further nine-week stint hosting a Sunday night show called The Sunday Service. It began on 6 September 2009 with Borrell playing a broad range of records spanning Jamaican dancehall, blues, rock'n'roll, krautrock and spoken word.

== Other work ==
Borrell has appeared twice on The Mighty Boosh, once alone as a giant rapist rabbit in the 2006 stage show and once with Razorlight in the episode "The Priest and the Beast". Noel Fielding also opened for Razorlight at their two sold out Alexandra Palace shows in 2005 and appeared in the Razorlight video for the song 'In the Morning' and 'Up All Night'. Borrell appeared on the front cover of the May 2007 issue of Vogue magazine, alongside supermodel Natalia Vodianova, in his trademark skinny white jeans and topless. Borrell is one of only seven men who have appeared on the cover of the UK version of Vogue. In 2008 Borrell and bandmate Andy Burrows appeared at the Teenage Cancer Trust comedy night at the Royal Albert Hall, hosted by Borrell's friend Noel Fielding. The two played a short acoustic set.

Late in 2007, Borrell played keyboards in a band he helped put together for Florence Welch of Florence and the Machine. The pair had met through Florence's manager Mairead Nash. Borrell went on to co-write and produced two songs with Welch, "The Hanging Song" and "Building Bricks" although these did not end up on Florence's debut album.

It was reported that Borrell would star in an Irvine Welsh scripted film alongside Colin Firth and Robert Carlyle called 'The Meat Trade', however the film did not make it into production.

Borrell appeared on Never Mind The Buzzcocks in 2013, where host Jack Whitehall teased him about how Borrell used to date Whitehall's sister.

In July 2022, Borrell performed at Standon Calling festival in Hertfordshire alongside Jack Flanagan of Mystery Jets under the name Jealous Nostril.
