= Go On Lad =

2008 British television advertisement

- A frame from "Go On Lad"
- Agency: Miles Calcraft Briginshaw Duffy
- Client: Premier Foods
- Language: English
- Running time: 122 seconds (2 minutes and 2 seconds)
- Product: Hovis sliced bread
- Release date: 12 September 2008
- Directed by: Ringan Ledwidge
- Music by: "History" (Working for a Nuclear Free City)
- Starring: Brian Mackie
- Production company: Rattling Stick
- Produced by: Sally Humphries
- Country: United Kingdom
- Budget: £1,000,000 (production) £15,000,000 (campaign)
- Followed by: Rolls
- Official website: http://www.hovis.co.uk/

"Go On Lad" is a British television and cinema advertisement launched by Premier Foods in 2008 to promote its Hovis brand of bread. The 122-second piece was commissioned as part of a £15,000,000 brand relaunch designed to reverse Hovis' declining market share and profits. The commercial follows the journey of a young boy through 122 years of British history, from the establishment of the Hovis brand in 1886 to the current day. The campaign was handled by advertising agency Miles Calcraft Briginshaw Duffy. Production of the commercial itself was contracted to London-based production company Rattling Stick, with post-production handled by The Mill. It was directed by Ringan Ledwidge. "Go On Lad" premiered on British television on 12 September 2008.

The advertisement, and its associated campaign, proved a popular, critical, and financial success. Its launch was covered by several national newspapers within the United Kingdom, including The Independent and the Daily Mirror, on television programmes including the Granada Reports and Loose Women, and by over 300 local and national radio stations. Sales of Hovis products jumped by over £12,000,000 in the weeks following the launch of Go On Lad, and over 1,000 unsolicited letters and e-mails were sent to Hovis praising the piece. The campaign received dozens of awards from the advertising and television industries, including Golds at the Creative Circle Awards, the Marketing Society Awards, and the British Television Advertising Awards. In 2009, the British public voted "Go On Lad" the best television commercial of the decade.

== Sequence ==
"Go On Lad" begins in 1886, with an over-the-shoulders view of a boy in a flat cap and brown jacket buying a loaf of bread in a bakery. After making his purchase, the boy leaves the shop into a bustling Victorian-era street, narrowly avoiding being run down by a horse and cart. He is chased into an alleyway by the cart's driver, losing his flat cap in the pursuit, and he passes a poster about the Titanic. When he exits through the other side the alley, a suffragette protest is underway. The boy weaves through a crowd of marching women bearing placards, emerging into an open square during World War I, where he spies a column of young soldiers on parade. The boy accompanies the soldiers for a few moments before peeling away to climb a nearby wall. After saluting the soldier he had marched next to, he climbs down the other side into the interbellum, and runs past a couple engaged in a conversation beside a period car. He kicks a can through another alley, following it into another street; one in ruins from The Blitz.

The music turns sombre for a moment as a family of refugees passes by, and an excerpt from Winston Churchill's delivery of the "We shall fight on the beaches" speech plays from a radio in a nearby home. A Spitfire flies overhead as the boy climbs over a pile of rubble to enter a new street, in which residents are engaged in a street party celebrating the accession of Elizabeth II. He crawls under the table, takes a biscuit and a glass of lemonade, then runs on into 1966, where a group celebrating England's victory in the 1966 FIFA World Cup chant "Champions!" as they pass him in a car. From here, changes to the boy's costume are made with every transition, reflecting the fashions of the periods he passes through. Farther down the road from 1966, the boy passes a British Asian couple in the 1970s, reflecting the spike in immigration in the community during that period. He turns a corner, running into a conflict between police and striking miners in the 1980s. One of the miners jeers the boy, and he continues running. As he runs alongside a river during the Millennium celebrations on New Year's Day 2000, fireworks go off in the background. Finally, the boy makes a turn into a council estate in 2008 and sits down with the loaf of bread at his kitchen table. His mother calls to him, 'Is that you home, love?', to which the boy replies 'Yeah'. And the piece closes on a shot of the boy's hand reaching for a slice of the Hovis loaf over the tagline "As good today as it's always been."

== Production ==
=== Background ===
From 1967 to 2007, the Hovis brand of bread was owned by Rank Hovis McDougall, and for much of that time was the market leader in the United Kingdom. However, following a "chop and change" marketing strategy, including several "confused" brand relaunches through the first half of the 2000s, rival brand Warburtons had increased sales and profits, and in 2006 both brands had approximately 28% of the £1.6b UK bread market. Despite continuing to show profits of £387m, Hovis continued to lose ground to Warburtons. Sales of the latter had increased by 24% in 2007 alone; by 2008, for every two loaves of Hovis sold in the UK, Warburtons sold three. The continuing failure of the brand began to affect Premier Foods as a whole, with the company's share price dropping from £3.50 to £1.80 in the 18 months following the acquisition.

Despite this, Hovis was still a valuable brand. Its reported profits, while declining, still amounted to £387m, making it the fourth largest grocery brand in the UK, behind Coca-Cola, Warburtons, and Walkers Crisps. Premier Foods hired a new head of marketing, Jon Goldstone, known for a strong branding background at Procter & Gamble. Goldstone quickly identified the issue facing Hovis, surmising that "[Hovis] had got into a situation where Warburtons was synonymous with healthier bread from real bakeries and Kingsmill had cornered the value end of the market. We were being squeezed and were falling fast." Goldstone's solution was to re-launch the brand, changing the formula of the bread, redesigning the packaging, and putting £15m into a new advertising campaign. To this end, Premier Foods consolidated its marketing across all brands into two advertising agencies, Miles Calcraft Briginshaw Duffy (MCBD) and McCann Erickson, with the latter originally taking on Hovis. But the Account Director Muna Nageh stayed close to the Hovis client and eventually had a chance to win the account out of McCann Erickson, who had failed to crack the brief whilst MCBD had been doing well on the brands they had won. The relaunch was the first campaign by MCBD for the brand, though it had done work on other Premier Foods labels such as Branston, Batchelors and OXO previously.

=== Production ===
In April 2008, Goldstone met with the team of MCBD, to discuss the advertising campaign which was to accompany the relaunch. They reviewed previous Hovis advertising for ideas, paying particular attention to the 1973 television advertisement Boy On Bike. Directed by Ridley Scott, Boy On Bike was an iconic piece of British culture; in a 2003 poll, over 60% of British people over 40 years old could still hum the theme used in the commercial ("New World Symphony by Dvorak), and in 2006 it was voted the greatest advertising campaign of all time by the public. From this, the campaign's theme was established: nostalgia. A pitch was put together by creative team Gavin Horrance and Danny Hunt of MCBD, comprising a set of "mood films" constructed from stock footage, and the idea of "the perilous journey a young boy takes through 122 years of British history to bring the small brown loaf back to his mam." The pitch was presented to Qualitative Assessment, a focus group of consumers, where it met a very positive response. From there, Goldman took the proposal directly to Robert Schofield, the head of Premier Foods, who greenlit the project immediately. A budget of £1,000,000 was put aside for production of the commercial alone, over three times as much as had ever been spent on production of a Premier Foods commercial to that date.

With permission to go ahead, MCBD began searching for a director to lead the production, eventually settling on Ringan Ledwidge. Ledwidge, who was working with Daniel Kleinman at the London-based production company Rattling Stick, had a reputation for good work on "magical realism" projects, with previous work including Forever for Volkswagen in 2002, and Rewind City for Orange earlier in 2008. The Hovis campaign, now assigned the title Go On Lad, was the most expensive and complex commercial Ledwidge had directed to date.

With only four months set aside for production of the commercial, work began in earnest on scouting for locations and cast capable of presenting the desired tone for Go On Lad. Several locations across the United Kingdom were looked at as potential sites for the six-day shoot, but while the producers of Boy On Bike had dressed a street in Dorset to appear Northern, Ledwidge opted to film in Northern England itself. Liverpool's Sweeting Street was dressed for use as the setting for the opening Victorian scene, while Falkner Street appeared as the World War I and interbellum scenes. Workers for the City Council partially demolished three buildings to set the scene for the Blitz section, bringing in over fifty tonnes of rubble for the set dressing. Locals of Hardy Street in Garston were recruited as extras for the Coronation scene, which was filmed at that location.

In all, over 1750 people were hired to act as extras in Go On Lad, including over 200 members of historical reenactment societies for the World War I scene alone. In casting for the role of the boy, Ledwidge wanted to eschew the "stylised blonde healthy child seen in most modern European advertising" in favour of someone who would evoke memories of the actors in productions such as Kes or Great Expectations. The boy eventually settled on for the role was Brian Mackie, a thirteen-year-old with no prior acting experience.

=== Post-production ===
Post-production was contracted to The Mill, who were given the brief to make it appear as though no computer-generated imagery or other visual effects had been used at all. The majority of the visual effects work was done using the Autodesk software Flame and Maya. This included simple work such as removing anachronistic yellow road markings, satellite dishes, and replacing PVC windows. More complex work included the removal of several buildings with modern architectural styles or features, the creation of a CGI colliery, a Spitfire and a Concorde jet aeroplane (which was later cut in editing), crowd multiplication for the striking miners and suffragettes, and the recreation of the Millennial fireworks display.

For editing of the commercial, Ledwidge looked to Richard Orrick, an editor he had collaborated with several times in the past. Several angles had been shot for each scene, as well as a number of cutaways establishing the era that the boy was travelling through. However, the brief for the commercial was specifically for a 122-second cut, one second for every year since the establishment of Hovis in 1886. For this reason, and to reinforce the viewer's connection with the boy, almost every shot which didn't feature Mackie was cut. Additional editing work was done to smooth the transitions between eras and maintain a steady pace within the commercial's narrative. Until half-way through editing, the music accompanying Go On Lad was to have been "Town Called Malice" by The Jam. However, after the right to use the piece had been purchased, alterations to the pacing of the narrative led Ledwidge to commission a new piece via Woodwork Music from Philip Kay of the Mancunian independent act Working for a Nuclear Free City, titled "History".

== Release and reception ==
=== Release ===
The campaign surrounding Go On Lad was conducted on a budget of £15m, and comprised extensive public relations work by Frank PR, the launch of a new Hovis website, new packaging using a bolder typeface and stronger colours, the re-launch of the unsliced "little brown loaf" featured in the campaign, and changes to the formulae of other Hovis lines, as well as a series of in-store deals and promotions.

Public relations work in the lead-up to the release of Go On Lad included stunts such as the deliberate leaking of a false rumour that footballer Wayne Rooney would be appearing in the ad as the new face of Hovis, the inclusion of several tabloid journalists as extras in the production, and the release of a making-of documentary featuring extra scenes, behind-the-scenes footage, and interviews with the cast and crew. The impact of the PR work was such that the Hovis campaign received an estimated £2.5m of free publicity even before Go On Lad's first broadcast, prompting competitors Kingsmill and Warburtons to vastly increase the number of in-store special offers and deals on their products as a defence tactic in the four weeks leading up to the ad's debut.

The first broadcast of Go On Lad was at 8:45pm on Friday 12 September 2008, as the final advertisement of a commercial break in the popular soap opera Coronation Street. ITV, the broadcaster of Coronation Street, were persuaded to cut the length of the programme by two seconds to accommodate the ad's unusual 122-second length. The full version of the commercial continued to air in cinemas for four weeks, with 90- and 10-second cuts appearing on television into early 2009.

=== Reception ===
List of awards

British Television Advertising Awards
- Gold - Best Television Commercial of the Year
- Gold - Best 60-90 Second Television Commercial
- Gold - Best Over 90 Second Television Commercial
- Silver - Cinema Commercials Also Shown on Television
Campaign BIG Awards
- Gold - Grocery, Soft Drinks, and Household Commercials for Television
Cannes Lions International Advertising Festival
- Bronze - Sweet Foods and Snacks
Creative Circle Awards
- Gold - Best Cinema Commercial
- Gold - Best Television Commercial
- Silver - Best Direction
- Bronze - Best Production Design
D&AD Awards
- Winner - Cinema Commercials (61–120 seconds)
- Winner - Cinematography
- Winner - Direction
- Winner - Television Commercial (120 seconds and over)
Grocery Industry Advertising & Marketing Awards
- Gold - Television and Cinema
Kinsale Shark Awards Advertising Festival
- Silver - International Television Commercial (Drinks, Food, and Confectionery)
International Food and Beverage Creative Excellence Awards
- Winner - Television and Cinema
- Winner - Television: Baking and Sweet Foods
Marketing Society Awards
- Winner - Excellence in Brand Revitalisation

Reaction to the release of the campaign within the media industry was immediate. Features on the campaign and on Brian Mackie appeared in several national newspapers, including The Independent, the Daily Mirror, the Daily Star. Coverage was also given to the story in local newspapers in Northern England and Scotland such as the Yorkshire Post, the Liverpool Echo, the Eastern Daily Press, and the Scottish edition of the Daily Record. Stories on the launch also appeared in other media: in television, the ad was discussed during segments of ITV programming such as the Granada Reports and Loose Women; in radio, over 300 national and regional stations made mention of the campaign; online, a version of the commercial uploaded to video sharing website YouTube received over 180,000 hits and 1,000 comments.

The public's response was equally impressive; within 24 hours of the first broadcast of Go On Lad, Hovis received over 1,000 unsolicited e-mails and letters praising the commercial. Research by the qualitative assessment organisation Millward Brown showed that Hovis' brand image improved by 8% in terms of "product value", and 6% in terms of perception of quality and tastiness of the product. In addition, the communication of the brand's tagline, "As good today as it's always been", increased from its 52% norm to 86%, and research showed that consumers were far more likely to talk about the brand amongst themselves than prior to the campaign's launch.

The response by the public translated directly into financial gains for the brand. Sales of Hovis products jumped by £12m in the three weeks following the campaign's launch. By the end of the following month, Hovis' share of the UK bread market increased by 3.5%, with £60m added to the top line of the business. By the end of November 2008, sales figures had increased by 14% from same period the previous year. The success of the campaign was such that it lent a halo effect to Premier Foods as a whole. By January 2009, the company's profit margins had increased from 2.8% to 12.2% and its share price had more than doubled.

The impact of the campaign did not go unnoticed by Hovis' competitors. Warburtons increased its annual marketing budget from £2m to £22m. Over half of this larger budget went towards the production and release of a new television and print campaign designed to emphasise the family-owned nature of the brand. The 60-second television component of the campaign, titled Foreign Businessman, premiered on 4 October 2008, during a commercial break in the talent show The X Factor. Foreign Businessman was largely panned by the advertising community; it was declared one of the ten worst campaigns of 2008 by Campaign magazine. Mark Ritson of Marketing magazine criticised Warburton's decisions on length and ad space purchases, saying: "Warburtons got similar audience numbers when it premiered its ad during The X Factor, but totally missed the context. It's a similar story with the length of the ads: Warburtons' 60-second spot is longer than the usual, but hardly breaks the mould.

Ritson went on to praise the Go On Lad campaign, adding: "Choosing 122 seconds, one for every year in its history, was a stroke of genius by Hovis. It not only makes for an epic ad, but also emphasised the brand's heritage in the launch PR backing the campaign." Indeed, Go On Lad proved a critical success, winning a slew of honours and awards from the television and marketing industries. These included becoming Campaign magazine's "Campaign of the Year" the Film4 Director's Cut Award, the Brand Revitalization Award at the Marketing Society Golden Jubilee Awards, the Television Commercial of the Year award (and golds in three other categories) at the British Television Advertising Awards, a Gold at the Creative Circle Awards, and a Bronze at the Cannes Lions International Advertising Festival. The annual Gunn Report recorded Go On Lad as the 32nd most-awarded commercial of the year, and in 2009, the British public voted Go On Lad the best commercial of the decade, ahead of competition such as Carlsberg's Old Lions and Cadbury's Gorilla.

=== Legacy ===
As a result of the success of the campaign, several other companies followed suit with nostalgia-themed campaigns of their own, with mixed results. Particularly singled out for derision were campaigns by Persil and Sainsbury's, with Leon Jaume of WCRS commenting on the latter in Campaign magazine: "This is meagre fare, frankly, and allows the blogsters to concentrate on the elephant on the bacon counter: that the ad doesn't so much nod to the recent Hovis epic as pick a fight with it, shouting: 'I've got decades of British history, me! Hear my tinkling piano track! Look at my loveable urchin! Watch my wartime reconstruction!' The bloggers are less than whelmed by the similarities, and I feel the uncomfortable frisson of kinship with them."

Several members of the crew behind Go On Lad went on to assist in Hovis' 2009 advertising campaign for its newly launched line of bread rolls. Simply titled Rolls, the 60-second television commercial continued the theme of switching from the Victorian period to the present day, and was once again written by Gavin Torrance and Danny Hunt of MCBD. While Ledwidge was originally interested in reprising his role as director, production company Rattling Stick eventually assigned Ivan Bird to oversee the project. The Mill returned to perform post-production of the commercial.

Several requests were made by teachers to Hovis for permission to use the commercial as a teaching tool in lessons on British history. Headteacher Jennifer Bailey wrote: "After the advert first aired, it was a huge talking point among our pupils. With TV being such a popular medium nowadays, it's a fun way of highlighting key historical British moments." The positive response to Go On Lad within the teaching community led Hovis to establish the "Hovis Educational Programme" in 2009, providing educational resources to a number of schools in a pilot scheme aimed at getting children more interested in history.

==== Accolades ====
Creator	Country	Accolade	Year	Rank
ITV	United Kingdom	ITV Ad of the Decade	2009	1
