= Ringan Ledwidge =

British film and commercial director

- Born: 24 May 1971; Canterbury, England
- Died: 8 November 2021 (aged 50)
- Occupation: Director
- Years active: 1997–2021
- Works: Full list
- Awards: Full list

Ringan Ledwidge (24 May 1971 – 8 November 2021) was a British film and commercial director.

== Life and career ==
Ledwidge studied at Ravensbourne College of Design and Communication in Kent. After graduating in 1993, he travelled to the Middle East and worked as a journalist and photographer in the Gaza Strip. He later journeyed through the United States, also working as a photographer.

After returning to the UK, he gradually shifted his focus to directing. He directed his first television commercial in 1997 and later produced music videos for bands such as Red Snapper, Whale, Travis, and Massive Attack.

In 1999, he was awarded the Young Director Award by the European Federation for Commercial Film Producers, leading to further work with major brands such as Adidas, Apple, Audi, Nike, and Volkswagen.

His commercials went on to receive multiple awards, including British Television Advertising Awards and recognition at the Cannes Lions.

In 2006, Ledwidge co-founded the production company Rattling Stick alongside Daniel Kleinman and Johnnie Frankel. The company went on to produce several acclaimed campaigns under Ledwidge's direction, such as Go On Lad (2008) for Hovis and Three Little Pigs (2012) for The Guardian.

Ledwidge made his feature film debut with Gone (2007), produced by Universal Pictures and Working Title Films. In 2012, he was signed by DreamWorks to direct the science fiction project Glimmer, which was planned for release in 2014.

He died of cancer in November 2021, at the age of 50.

== Awards ==
- 1999 – Young Director Award, European Federation for Commercial Film Producers
- 2000 – Silver Cannes Lions, Volkswagen – Self Defense
- 2001 – Silver Cannes Lions, Adidas – Horses
- 2005 – Gold Arrow, British Television Advertising Awards, Lynx – Getting Dressed
- 2009 – Best Commercial, British Television Advertising Awards, Hovis – Go On Lad
- 2012 – Best Crafted Commercial, British Television Advertising Awards, The Guardian – Three Little Pigs
- 2016 – Best Music Video, Camerimage Awards, Massive Attack – Voodoo In My Blood (ft. Young Fathers)
- 2017 – Best Director, shots Awards
- 2017 – Best in Book, Creative Review Annual Awards, Audi – Clowns
- 2021/2022 – Posthumous Award, British Arrows

== Filmography ==
Ref.:

Film

- Gone (2007)

Music video

Year	Title	Artist
1998	"Image Of You"	Red Snapper
1999	"Crying At Airports"	Whale feat. Bus 75
1999	"Rainbows Of Colour"	Grooverider
1999	"Bring It On"	Gomez
1999	"Turn	Travis
2000	"Coming Around"	Travis
2009	"One Day Like This"	Elbow
2016	"Voodoo In My Blood"	Massive Attack

Commercials

Year	Title	Brand
2000	"Police"	BBC Radio 1
2001	"Rain"	Guinness
2002	"Exploding Teenager"	Sneak
2003	"First Dance"	BBC Radio 6 Music
2004	"Getting Dressed"	Lynx
2004	"Road to Lisbon"	Adidas
2004	"Crash"	Department for Education
2005	"Hot Dog"	Nike
2006	"Last Man Standing"	Adidas
2007	"Dangerous Liaison"	Levi's
2008	"Brains"	Britvic
2008	"Go On Lad"	Hovis
2008	"Rewind City"	Orange
2009	"Tunnel"	Stella Artois
2009	"Jockey"	Weetabix
2010	"Father and Daughter"	Vodafone
2010	"After Hours Athlete"	Puma
2010	"Ivan Cobenk"	Logitech
2011	"Crying Jean"	Stella Artois
2011	"Le Quest"	Stella Artois
2011	"Life Story"	Barnardo's
2012	"The Other Half"	John Lewis
2012	"Susan Glenn"	Axe
2012	"Three Little Pigs"	The Guardian
2012	"Nike Free, I will run to you"	Nike
2012	"Airborne"	Nike
2013	"Nutcracker"	Baileys
2014	"Christmas Is For Sharing"	Sainsbury's
2014	"Winner Stays On"	Nike
2015	"Dead Mouse Theatre"	Tomcat
2016	"The Switch"	Nike
2016	"Duel"	Audi
2017	"Clown Proof" / "Clowns"	Audi
2017	"Last Days"	Jose Cuervo
2017	"Gabrielle"	Chanel
2018	"iPhone X Memory"	Apple
2019	"Cashew"	Audi
2019	"Followers"	Miller Lite
2020	"Commencement"	Bank of America
