= Ben Seresin =

New Zealand cinematographer

- Born: Benjamin Paul Seresin; 3 November 1962 (age 63); Wellington, New Zealand
- Years active: 1981–present
- Relatives: Michael Seresin (brother)
- Website: www.benseresin.com

Benjamin Paul Seresin, BSC, ASC (born 3 November 1962) is a New Zealand cinematographer, best known for his work in blockbuster action films.

== Background ==
His father, Harry Seresin, was a Jewish emigrant from Germany who became a prominent figure in the hospitality and café industry in Wellington.

He is the younger brother of Michael Seresin, who is also a cinematographer.

== Career ==
At the age of 18, he moved to Australia to enter the film industry. After serving as a camera assistant, he moved to the United Kingdom, where he has lived since 1992.

Seresin described his approach to his work as "detached". "As a DP, you have to learn to both trust your eye and to be brave enough to say to the director 'This is the wrong decision'".

He has been a member of the British Society of Cinematographers (BSC) since 2010, and the American Society of Cinematographers (ASC) since 2011.

During the tumultuous production of World War Z, Seresin replaced the cinematographers Robert Richardson and Newton Thomas Sigel, who declined to return for extensive reshoots. Richardson was the original cinematographer, but major logistic problems and delays made him leave principal photography, with Siegel serving as replacement before Seresin took over. In the end, Seresin received sole credit for the film.

== Filmography ==
=== Film ===
Year	Title	Director	Notes
1997	The James Gang	Mike Barker	
1999	Best Laid Plans	Mike Barker	
2000	Circus	Rob Walker	
2004	A Good Woman	Mike Barker	
2007	Gone	Ringan Ledwidge	
2009	Transformers: Revenge of the Fallen	Michael Bay	
2010	Unstoppable	Tony Scott	
2013	Broken City	Allen Hughes	
2013	Pain & Gain	Michael Bay	
2013	World War Z	Marc Forster	
2017	The Mummy	Alex Kurtzman	
2021	Chaos Walking	Doug Liman	
2021	Godzilla vs. Kong	Adam Wingard	
2023	The Mother	Niki Caro	
2024	Godzilla x Kong: The New Empire	Adam Wingard	

=== Television ===
Year	Title	Director	Notes
1990	He-Play	Mike Cuff	Episode "Keeper"
1996	Dalziel and Pascoe	Maurice Phillips	Episode "An Advancement of Learning"
2003	Keen Eddie	Simon West	Episode "Pilot"

TV movies

Year	Title	Director
1995	Go Back Out	Mike Barker
1997	The Grimleys	Declan Lowney
2009	Free Agents	Richard Laxton

Documentary series

Year	Title	Director	Notes
2019	The Disappearance of Madeleine McCann	Chris Smith	With Josep M. Civit, Geoffrey Sentamu, Patrick Smith, James Watson and Benjamin Michael Wearing
2022	Branson	Chris Smith	With Tim Cragg and Geoffrey Sentamu

== Accolades ==
Year	Award	Category	Title	Result	Ref.
2010	Satellite Awards	Best Cinematography	Unstoppable	Nominated	
