= Gold Hill, Shaftesbury =

Street in Shaftesbury, Dorset, United Kingdom

Coordinates: 51.0051°N 2.1971°W

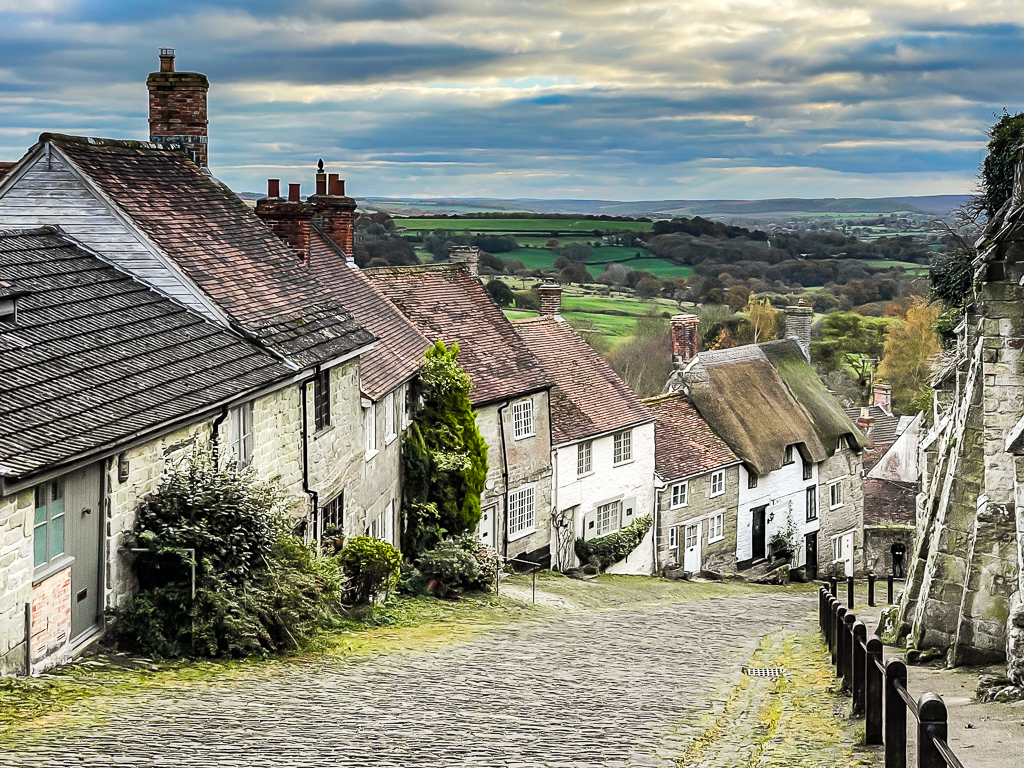
Gold Hill with buttressed precinct wall of Shaftesbury Abbey to the right

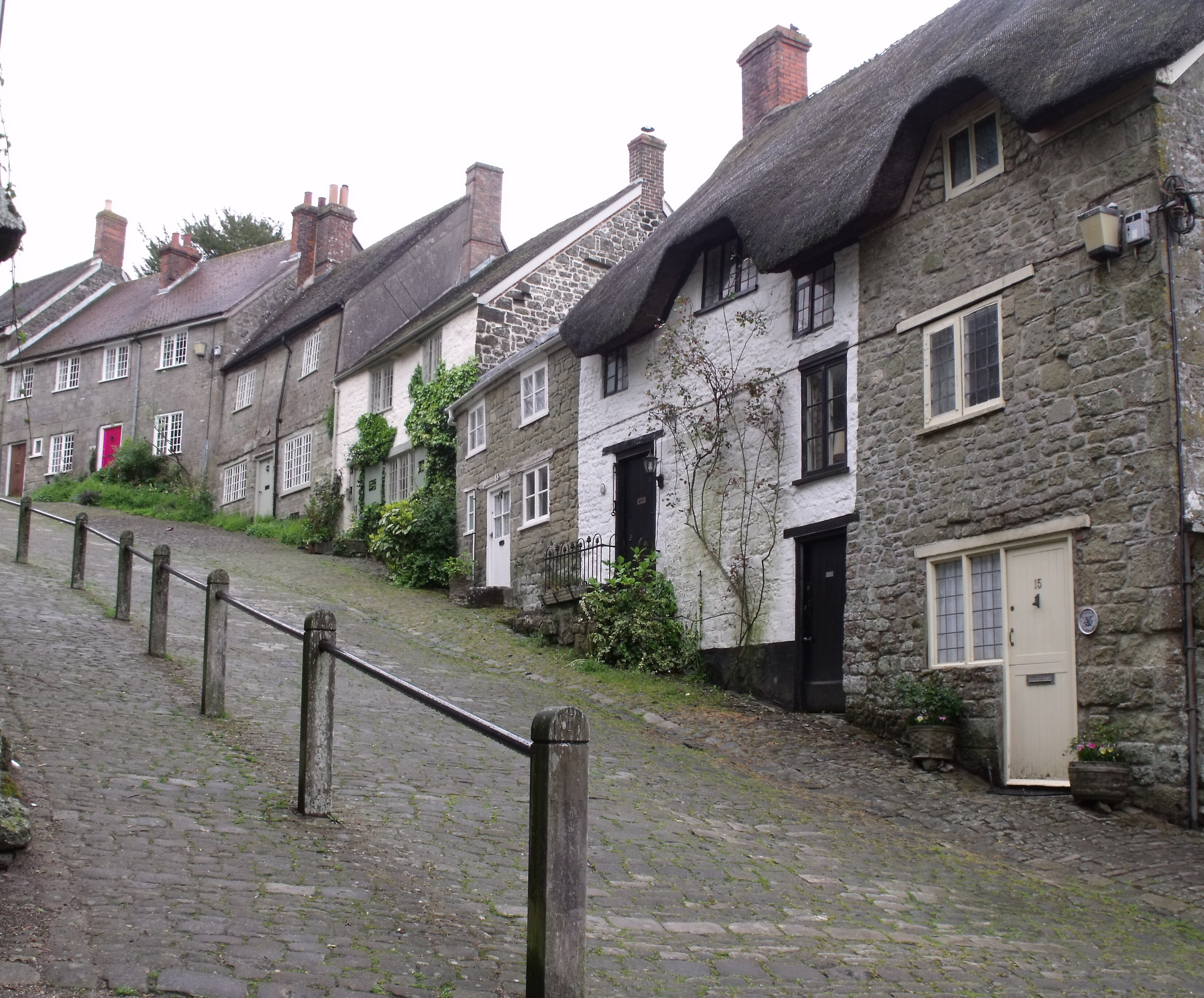
Viewed from the bottom

Gold Hill is a steep cobbled street in the town of Shaftesbury in the English county of Dorset. The view looking down from the top of the street has been described as "one of the most romantic sights in England."

At the top of the street is the 14th-century St Peter's Church, one of the few buildings remaining in Shaftesbury from before the 18th century. Adjacent to the church is the former Priest's House (Sun and Moon Cottage), which is still part of the Gold Hill Museum building but now houses a shop.

The cobbled street runs beside buttressed walls of the precinct, which are the grounds surrounding ancient Shaftesbury Abbey, built by King Alfred the Great. The walls are a scheduled monument. Their origins are not known, but are presumed to have been built in the 1360s, when the abbess or other authority was given royal permission to build town defences.

Each year the town hosts the Gold Hill Fair to raise money for local charities.

== In media ==
Gold Hill has been used as a setting for film and television. It appears in the 1967 film version of Thomas Hardy's Far from the Madding Crowd.

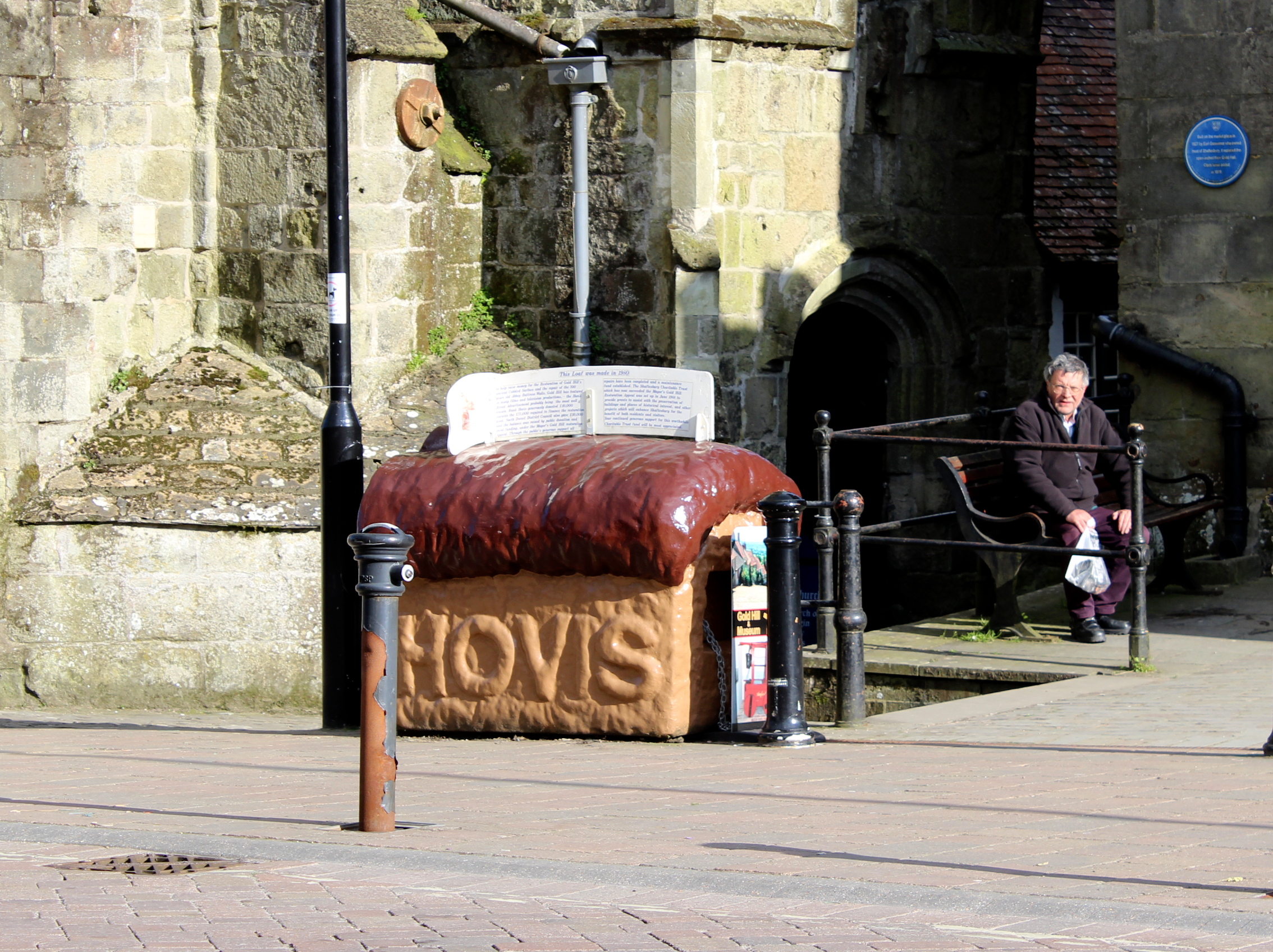
Hovis bread monument at Gold Hill

The street is the main setting for the 1973 "Boy on Bike" television advertisement for Hovis bread, which has been voted Britain's favourite advertisement of all time. It was directed by Ridley Scott, and includes the main theme from the slow movement of Antonín Dvořák's Symphony No. 9. For this reason, the hill is still sometimes referred to as "Hovis Hill". The Two Ronnies spoofed the Hovis advert in a sketch filmed in 1978, also filmed at Gold Hill. They recreated the advert in detail, except that the delivery boy is now in middle age, still delivering to the top of the hill and speaks in a northern accent.
