= I Miss Me =

I Miss Me may refer to:

- "I Miss Me", a 1995 song by Whale from We Care
- "I Miss Me", a 2004 song by Brad Cotter from Patient Man
- "I Miss Me", a 2018 song by Kyle
