= MTV Europe Music Award for Best Video =

Music video award

- Awarded for: Music videos
- Country: Europe
- Presented by: MTV
- First award: 1994
- Currently held by: Taylor Swift feat. Post Malone – "Fortnight" (2024)

Highlights
- Most wins: Taylor Swift (4)
- Most nominations: Taylor Swift (7)
- Website: ema.mtv.tv/

The MTV Europe Music Award for Best Video is an award category presented at the MTV Europe Music Awards. The award was first presented in 1994 under the name Best Director, awarded to Whale's "Hobo Humpin' Slobo Babe". This is the only MTV EMA award - excluding special awards - whose winner is chosen by MTV, rather than by the public. "Hey Ya!", "Born This Way" and "Havana" are the only music videos to also win Best Song. The artist with the most wins is Taylor Swift with four wins. Taylor Swift is the artist with the most nominations, with seven. Swift and Kendrick Lamar are the only performers to have won the award for a video they co-directed: Lamar for "Humble" in 2017 and Swift for "Me!" in 2019.

== Winners and nominees ==
Winners are listed first and highlighted in bold.

† indicates an MTV Video Music Award for Video of the Year–winning video.
‡ indicates an MTV Video Music Award for Video of the Year–nominated video that same year.

=== 1990s ===
Year	Artist	Song	Director	Ref
1994
1994	**Whale**	**"Hobo Humpin' Slobo Babe"**	**Mark Pellington**	
1994	Beastie Boys	"Sabotage"	Spike Jonze ‡	
1994	Enigma	"Return to Innocence"	Julien Temple	
1994	MC Solaar	"Nouveau Western"	Stephane Sednaoui	
1994	U2	"Stay (Faraway, So Close!)"	Wim Wenders and Mark Neale	
1995
1995	**Massive Attack**	**"Protection"**	**Michel Gondry**	
1995	Weezer	"Buddy Holly"	Spike Jonze ‡	
1995	Madonna	"Human Nature"	Jean-Baptiste Mondino	
1995	Michael Jackson and Janet Jackson	"Scream"	Mark Romanek ‡	
1995	Therapy?	"Loose"	W.I.Z.	
1997
1997	**The Prodigy**	**"Breathe"**	**Walter Stern**	
1997	Blur	"Song 2"	Sophie Muller	
1997	The Chemical Brothers	"Block Rockin' Beats"	Dom and Nic	
1997	Daft Punk	"Around the World"	Michel Gondry	
1997	Radiohead	"Paranoid Android"	Magnus Carlsson	
1998
1998	**Massive Attack**	**"Teardrop"**	**Walter Stern**	
1998	Aphex Twin	"Come to Daddy"	Chris Cunningham	
1998	Beastie Boys	"Intergalactic"	Nathaniel Hörnblowér	
1998	Eagle-Eye Cherry	"Save Tonight"	Johan Camitz	
1998	Garbage	"Push It"	Andrea Giacobbe	
1999
1999	**Blur**	**"Coffee & TV"**	**Hammer and Tongs**	
1999	Aphex Twin	"Windowlicker"	Chris Cunningham	
1999	Björk	"All Is Full of Love"	Chris Cunningham	
1999	Fatboy Slim	"Praise You"	Spike Jonze	
1999	George Michael with Mary J. Blige	"As"	Big TV!	

=== 2000s ===
Year	Artist	Song	Director	Ref
2000
2000	**Moby**	**"Natural Blues"**	**David LaChapelle**	
2000	Blink 182	"All the Small Things"	Marcos Siega ‡	
2000	Foo Fighters	"Learn to Fly"	Jesse Peretz	
2000	Red Hot Chili Peppers	"Californication"	Jonathan Dayton and Valerie Faris ‡	
2000	Robbie Williams	"Rock DJ"	Vaughan Arnell	
2001
2001	**The Avalanches**	**"Since I Left You"**	**Blue Source**	
2001	Fatboy Slim	"Weapon of Choice"	Spike Jonze ‡	
2001	Gorillaz	"Clint Eastwood"	Jamie Hewlett and Pete Candeland	
2001	Outkast	"Ms. Jackson"	F. Gary Gray	
2001	Robbie Williams	"Supreme"	Vaughan Arnell	
2002
2002	**Röyksopp**	**"Remind Me"**	**H5**	
2002	Basement Jaxx	"Where's Your Head At?"	Traktor	
2002	Eminem	"Without Me"	Joseph Kahn †	
2002	Primal Scream	"Miss Lucifer"	Dawn Shadforth	
2002	The White Stripes	"Fell in Love with a Girl"	Michel Gondry ‡	
2003
2003	**Sigur Rós**	**"Untitled 1"**	**Floria Sigismondi**	
2003	Missy Elliott	"Work It"	Dave Meyers †	
2003	Queens of the Stone Age	"Go with the Flow"	Shynola	
2003	U.N.K.L.E.	"Eye for an Eye"	Shynola	
2003	The White Stripes	"Seven Nation Army"	Alex and Martin	
2004
2004	**Outkast**	**"Hey Ya!"**	**Bryan Barber †**	
2004	The Cure	"The End of the World"	Floria Sigismondi	
2004	Jay Z	"99 Problems"	Mark Romanek ‡	
2004	The Streets	"Fit But You Know It"	Dougal Wilson	
2004	The White Stripes	"The Hardest Button to Button"	Michel Gondry	
2005
2005	**The Chemical Brothers**	**"Believe"**	**Dom and Nic**	
2005	Beck	"E-Pro"	Shynola	
2005	Gorillaz	"Feel Good Inc."	Jamie Hewlett and Pete Candeland	
2005	Rammstein	"Keine Lust"	Jörn Heitmann	
2005	Gwen Stefani	"What You Waiting For"	Francis Lawrence	
2006
2006	**Justice vs. Simian**	**"We Are Your Friends"**	**Rozan and Schmeltz**	
2006	Gnarls Barkley	"Crazy"	Robert Hales	
2006	OK Go	"A Million Ways"	Trish Sie and OK Go	
2006	Pink	"Stupid Girls"	Dave Meyers	
2006	Kanye West	"Touch the Sky"	Chris Milk	
2007
2007	**Justice**	**"D.A.N.C.E."**	**Jonas and François ‡**	
2007	Bat for Lashes	"What's a Girl to Do?"	Dougal Wilson	
2007	The Chemical Brothers	"The Salmon Dance"	Dom and Nic	
2007	Foo Fighters	"The Pretender"	Sam Brown	
2007	Justin Timberlake	"What Goes Around... Comes Around"	Samuel Bayer ‡	
2007	Kanye West	"Stronger"	Hype Williams ‡	
2008
2008	**Thirty Seconds to Mars**	**"A Beautiful Lie"**	**Angakok Panipaq**	
2008	Madonna (feat. Justin Timberlake and Timbaland)	"4 Minutes"	Jonas and François	
2008	Santogold	"L.E.S. Artistes"	Nima Nourizadeh	
2008	Snoop Dogg	"Sensual Seduction"	Melina and Steven Johnson	
2008	Weezer	"Pork and Beans"	Mathew Cullen	
2009
2009	**Beyoncé**	**"Single Ladies (Put a Ring on It)"**	**Jake Nava †**	
2009	Eminem	"We Made You"	Joseph Kahn ‡	
2009	Katy Perry	"Waking Up in Vegas"	Joseph Kahn	
2009	Shakira	"She Wolf"	Jake Nava	
2009	Britney Spears	"Circus"	Francis Lawrence	

=== 2010s ===
Year	Artist	Song	Director	Ref
2010
2010	**Katy Perry (feat. Snoop Dogg)**	**"California Gurls"**	**Mathew Cullen**	
2010	Eminem (feat. Rihanna)	"Love the Way You Lie"	Joseph Kahn	
2010	Lady Gaga (feat. Beyoncé)	"Telephone"	Jonas Åkerlund ‡	
2010	Plan B	"Prayin'"	Daniel Wolfe	
2010	Thirty Seconds to Mars	"Kings and Queens"	Bartholomew Cubbins ‡	
2011
2011	**Lady Gaga**	**"Born This Way"**	**Nick Knight**	
2011	Adele	"Rolling in the Deep"	Sam Brown ‡	
2011	Beastie Boys	"Make Some Noise"	Spike Jonze ‡	
2011	Beyoncé	"Run the World (Girls)"	Francis Lawrence	
2011	Justice	"Civilization"	Romain Gavras	
2012
2012	**Psy**	**"Gangnam Style"**	**Cho Soo-hyun**	
2012	Katy Perry	"Wide Awake"	Tony T. Datis ‡	
2012	Lady Gaga	"Marry the Night"	Lady Gaga	
2012	M.I.A.	"Bad Girls"	Romain Gavras ‡	
2012	Rihanna (feat. Calvin Harris)	"We Found Love"	Melina Matsoukas †	
2013
2013	**Miley Cyrus**	**"Wrecking Ball"**	**Terry Richardson †**	
2013	Lady Gaga	"Applause"	Inez & Vinoodh	
2013	Robin Thicke (feat. T.I. and Pharrell Williams)	"Blurred Lines"	Diane Martel ‡	
2013	Thirty Seconds to Mars	"Up in the Air"	Bartholomew Cubbins	
2013	Justin Timberlake	"Mirrors"	Floria Sigismondi †	
2014
2014	**Katy Perry (feat. Juicy J)**	**"Dark Horse"**	**Mathew Cullen**	
2014	Iggy Azalea (feat. Rita Ora)	"Black Widow"	Director X and Iggy Azalea	
2014	Kiesza	"Hideaway"	Blayre Ellestad and Kiesza	
2014	Sia	"Chandelier"	Daniel Askill and Sia ‡	
2014	Pharrell Williams	"Happy"	Yoann Lemoine ‡	
2015
2015	**Macklemore & Ryan Lewis**	**"Downtown"**	**Ryan Lewis, Macklemore and** **Jason Koenig**	
2015	Kendrick Lamar	"Alright"	Colin Tilley and the Little Homies ‡	
2015	Sia	"Elastic Heart"	Sia and Daniel Askill	
2015	Taylor Swift (feat. Kendrick Lamar)	"Bad Blood"	Joseph Kahn †	
2015	Pharrell Williams	"Freedom"	Paul Hunter	
2016
2016	**The Weeknd (feat. Daft Punk)**	**"Starboy"**	**Grant Singer**	
2016	Beyoncé	"Formation"	Melina Matsoukas †	
2016	Coldplay	"Up&Up"	Vania Heymann and Gal Muggia	
2016	Kanye West	"Famous"	Kanye West ‡	
2016	Tame Impala	"The Less I Know the Better"	Canada	
2017
2017	**Kendrick Lamar**	**"HUMBLE."**	**Dave Meyers and The Little Homies †**	
2017	Foo Fighters	"Run	Dave Grohl	
2017	Katy Perry (feat. Migos)	"Bon Appétit"	Dent De Cuir	
2017	Kyle (feat. Lil Yachty)	"iSpy"	Colin Tilley	
2017	Taylor Swift	"Look What You Made Me Do"	Joseph Kahn	
2018
2018	**Camila Cabello (feat. Young Thug)**	**"Havana"**	**Dave Meyers** †	
2018	Ariana Grande	"No Tears Left to Cry"	Dave Meyers ‡	
2018	Childish Gambino	"This Is America"	Hiro Murai ‡	
2018	Lil Dicky (feat. Chris Brown)	"Freaky Friday"	Tony Yacenda	
2018	The Carters	"APESHIT"	Ricky Saiz ‡	
2019
2019	**Taylor Swift (feat. Brendon Urie of Panic! at the Disco)**	**"ME!"**	**Taylor Swift and Dave Meyers**	
2019	Ariana Grande	"thank u, next"	Hannah Lux Davis ‡	
2019	Billie Eilish	"bad guy"	Dave Meyers ‡	
2019	Lil Nas X (feat. Billy Ray Cyrus)	"Old Town Road (Remix)"	Calmatic ‡	
2019	Rosalía and J Balvin (feat. El Guincho)	"Con altura"	Director X	

=== 2020s ===
Year	Artist	Song	Director	Ref
2020
2020	**DJ Khaled (feat. Drake)**	**"Popstar"** ‡	**Director X**	
2020	Billie Eilish	"Everything I Wanted" ‡	Billie Eilish	
2020	Cardi B (feat. Megan Thee Stallion)	"WAP" ‡	Colin Tilley	
2020	Karol G (feat. Nicki Minaj)	"Tusa"	Mike Ho	
2020	Lady Gaga and Ariana Grande	"Rain on Me" ‡	Robert Rodriguez	
2020	Taylor Swift	"The Man" ‡	Taylor Swift	
2020	The Weeknd	"Blinding Lights" †	Anton Tammi †	
2021
2021	**Lil Nas X**	**"Montero (Call Me by Your Name)"** †	**Tanu Muino**	
2021	Doja Cat (feat. SZA)	"Kiss Me More" ‡	Warren Fu	
2021	Ed Sheeran	"Bad Habits" ‡	Dave Meyers	
2021	Justin Bieber (feat. Daniel Caesar and Giveon)	"Peaches"	Colin Tilley	
2021	Normani (feat. Cardi B)	"Wild Side"	Tanu Muino	
2021	Taylor Swift	"Willow"	Taylor Swift	
2022
2022	**Taylor Swift**	**All Too Well: The Short Film †**	**Taylor Swift**	
2022	Blackpink	"Pink Venom"	Seo Hyun-Seung	
2022	Doja Cat	"Woman" ‡	Child	
2022	Harry Styles	"As It Was" ‡	Tanu Muino	
2022	Kendrick Lamar	"The Heart Part 5"	Dave Free and Kendrick Lamar	
2022	Nicki Minaj	"Super Freaky Girl" ‡	Joseph Kahn	
2023
2023	**Taylor Swift**	**"Anti-Hero" †**	**Taylor Swift**	
2023	Cardi B (feat. Megan Thee Stallion)	"Bongos"	Tanu Muino	
2023	Doja Cat	"Paint the Town Red"	Doja Cat and Nina McNeely	
2023	Little Simz	"Gorilla"	Dave Meyers	
2023	Miley Cyrus	"Flowers" ‡	Jacob Bixenman	
2023	Olivia Rodrigo	"Vampire" ‡	Petra Collins	
2023	SZA	"Kill Bill" ‡	Christian Breslauer	
2024
2024	**Taylor Swift (feat. Post Malone)**	**"Fortnight" †**	**Taylor Swift**	
2024	Ariana Grande	"We Can't Be Friends (Wait for Your Love)" ‡	Christian Breslauer	
2024	Charli XCX	"360"	Aidan Zamiri	
2024	Eminem	"Houdini" ‡	Rich Lee	
2024	Kendrick Lamar	"Not Like Us"	Dave Free and Kendrick Lamar	
2024	Lisa (feat. Rosalía)	"New Woman"	Dave Meyers	

== Statistic ==
As of 2024.

Number of European Nominations	Total Number
44	126

== See also ==
- MTV Video Music Award for Video of the Year
