= Cake (advertisement) =

UK advertisement campaign for Škoda Auto

- a frame from Cake
- Agency: Fallon (London)
- Client: Škoda Auto
- Language: English
- Running time: 60 seconds
- Product: Second-generation Škoda Fabia automobiles
- Release date: 17 May 2007
- Directed by: Chris Palmer
- Music by: Julie Andrews ("My Favourite Things")
- Production company: Gorgeous Enterprises
- Produced by: Rupert Smythe
- Country: United Kingdom
- Budget: £500,000 (est.)
- Official website: http://www.skoda.co.uk

Cake (officially named Baking Of...) is a television and cinema advertisement launched in 2007 by Škoda Auto to promote the new second-generation Fabia supermini car in the United Kingdom. The 60-second spot forms the centrepiece of an integrated advertising campaign comprising appearances on television, in cinemas, in newspapers and magazines, online, and through direct marketing. The campaign and its component parts were handled by the London branch of advertising agency Fallon Worldwide. Cake was directed by British director Chris Palmer. Production was contracted to Gorgeous Enterprises, with sound handled by Wave Studios. It premiered on British television on 17 May 2007.

The campaign was a critical, popular, and financial success. It has been credited for the significant improvements in awareness and public opinion of the brand, and received honours from a number of advertising festivals and awards ceremonies, including several from the British Television Advertising Awards, the Cannes Lions International Advertising Festival, and the Creative Circle Awards.

A "meaner" version of the advert was made to promote the vRS model of the Fabia.

== Sequence ==
Cake opens on a baker cracking eggs into a mixing bowl to the opening strains of "My Favorite Things", performed by Julie Andrews. This begins a montage of shots of white-uniformed cooks moving trolleys of ingredients and performing cake preparation work such as zesting oranges and mechanically mixing cake batter. Several large blocks of madeira cake are taken from the oven, starting a time-lapse sequence of the brick-like cakes being arranged into a pile and being mortared with buttercream icing. After a shot of gloved hands kneading orange sugar paste, a woman pours melted chocolate into a pot of Rice Krispies. The sugar paste is pressed between rollers, and the pot of Rice Krispies emptied into a mould. Layers of Battenberg cake are mortared together with raspberry jam. The Rice Krispies are removed from the moulds and arranged as panels around the madeira structure, creating the rough outline of a car. Jelly mixture is poured into a mould while another cook attaches Fox's Glacier Mints to a fondant base to create a headlamp. Long lines of liquorice are wrapped as belts around pieces of a madeira engine. A tin of golden syrup is poured in place of lubricant. The engine is lowered into the front of the car while pastry chairs are lowered into the interior. The jelly mould is removed to reveal a brake light, and a tyre made of chocolate fondant is wheeled in and various details such as liquorice windscreen wipers and a front grille made of chocolate Flakes are added to the car. The bonnet is lowered and icing sugar is dusted onto the roof before a fondant Škoda logo is attached to the front. The closing shot is of the team lined up around their creation, which now appears to be a cake replica of a Škoda Fabia, with the tagline "The new Fabia. Full of lovely stuff." across the bottom.

== Production ==
=== Background ===
Ingredients
10 kg white chocolate chunks
3 kg orange peel strips
1 kg angelica
12.5 kg raspberry jam
100 kg wheat flour
100 kg caster sugar
20 kg glace cherries
30 kg brown almonds
20 kg raisins
25 kg dried apricot
5 kg cocoa powder
180 fresh eggs
42 kg chocolate fudge
180 kg orange sugar paste
90 kg brown sugar paste
40 kg black sugar paste
50 kg white sugar paste
200 kg cake margarine
270 kg icing sugar
40 kg milk calets

Advertising agency Fallon began representing Škoda in 1999, and its first campaign was for the first generation of the Fabia supermini, the successor to the Felicia, in early 2000. While the previous advertising agency, Grey London, had succeeded in improving the company's image, Škoda cars were still the butt of many a joke, and were seen as "naff" by British consumers. Fallon took a lighter, self-denigrating approach - the strapline of the first series of ads (Vandal, Factory Tour) played off the disbelief of the public that a Škoda car could be of high quality, using the strapline "It's a Skoda, honest." The campaign was a tremendous success, dramatically reversing public opinion of the brand. Sales of Škoda vehicles increased by record amounts during the period in which the campaign aired.

Upon the launch of the second generation of the Fabia, Fallon chose to shift the focus away from improving the Škoda brand as a whole and towards pushing individual aspects of the cars. The strapline for the Fabia, with its numerous "smaller, helpful features", such as hooks for carrier bags in the boot to keep shopping upright, was to be "full of lovely stuff". The idea for a commercial based around building a car out of cake came from a conversation between creative directors John Allison and Chris Bovill whilst sharing cake on Valentine's Day. Approval was given for a campaign on a cake theme targeting couples aged 35-plus, with a budget estimated at around £500,000.

=== Filming ===
Once approval was given to the project, director Chris Palmer was brought on board. Palmer's previous work included award-winning spots for Transport for London and the acclaimed Old Lions for Carlsberg in 2006. Palmer's plan was to shoot the production of an actual life-sized Fabia cake with little or no computer-generated imagery. With the air-date for the finished piece set only four weeks from the start of the project, of which Easter celebrations would occupy a large portion, there was no time for any research. All decisions were to be made on the fly, during the production itself.

The on-screen crew consisted of six home economists led by Peta O'Brien and Sarah Tildersley, three sugar chefs, a machine operator, two prop experts, and four special effects modelmakers from Pennicott Payne Ltd, with a large production team off-camera. Filming was done in Shepperton Studios over four days, with baking machinery rented from baking equipment company Brook Foods, though preliminary work such as casting moulds for the Rice Krispie panels was done a week beforehand. Production finished exactly on time, with the final touch—the Škoda badge—fitted at 2:30am on the last day of the schedule. The crew planned to donate the remains of the cake to local charities and hospitals, but after four days under hot studio lights, it was no longer thought fit for human consumption, and was donated for composting to the East London Community Recycling Project in Clapham. However, a few pieces, such as the chocolate speedometer and marzipan wing mirrors were kept for posterity.

=== Post-production ===
Post-production work was performed by Tom Sparks of Alteration Services, with video editing conducted by The Quarry. Ancillary elements of the campaign, such as the online presence and direct marketing, were handled by advertising agency Archibald Ingall Stretton, who had worked with Škoda for eight years prior to Cake. The online elements of the campaign included a dedicated microsite, which was linked to through baking-themed banner ads placed on the sites such as The Times Online, AOL, and Top Gear. For the direct marketing portion of the campaign, Archibald Ingall Stretton sent out car-shaped a double-chocolate, toffee-fudge cream scented air fresheners in the mail to potential and former clients.

=== Sound ===
The sound was recorded at Wave Recording Studios by sound engineer Parv Third.

== Release and reception ==
List of awards

ANDY Awards
- Silver – Television
Art Directors Club Awards
- Distinctive Meric - Craft
- Distinctive Merit - Television
British Television Advertising Awards
- Gold - Automotive
- Gold - European
- Gold - Television, 30-60 Seconds
British Television Advertising Craft Awards
- Winner - Best Model-Making
- Winner - Best Use of Recorded Music
- Winner - Commercial of the Year
Campaign Awards
- Gold - Television and Cinema
Cannes Lions International Advertising Festival
- Gold Lion - Automotive
Creative Circle Awards
- Winner - Best Direction
- Winner - Best Idea in 60 Seconds
- Winner - Best Production Design
- Winner - Best Television Commercial
- Winner - Best Use of Music
Clio Awards
- Silver - Television
D&AD Awards
- Yellow Pencil - Practical Special Effects
Epica Awards
- Silver - Film
Eurobest Awards
- Gold - Television/Cinema
London International Awards
- Finalist - Television/Film
Midsummer Awards
- Gold - Automotive
- Silver - Best Use of Music

Cake premiered on Thursday 17 May 2007. The dedicated microsite went online at 6pm, while the 60-second commercial first aired on ITV, Channel 4, Five, and on several multichannel television networks between 9 and 10pm. In addition, a 30-second edit of Cake began airing from Monday 21 May 2009. The commercial spaces purchased for Cake were chosen specifically to reach a mainstream audience, with selections including Big Brother, Britain's Got Talent, Coronation Street, CSI: Miami, Deal or No Deal, GMTV, Grand Designs, Grease Is the Word, Market Kitchen, This Morning, and Trinny & Susannah Undress..., as well as television screenings of films such as The Talented Mr. Ripley and Layer Cake. The value of the spaces purchased for Cake from its debut until 30 June was greater than for any other automotive commercial.

The campaign was an immediate popular and critical success. Within two weeks, 37,000 people had visited the Skoda Fabia's microsite and a further 260,000 had viewed the clip on video sharing website YouTube. By 10 June, views on YouTube climbed to over 700,000, nine groups had been set up on social networking site Facebook with a combined total of over 2,000 members, and a search for "Skoda cake car" on search engine Google returned over 150,000 results. Market research conducted by YouGov showed substantial improvement in the public's perception of the Škoda brand in the UK.

It was lauded by the press, appearing in features even as a front-page story in a Czech newspaper. Reviewers compared the piece favourably with earlier iconic Honda campaigns such as Cog and Grrr. Paul Silburn, creative partner of Saatchi & Saatchi, said of Cake: "It's fresh, innovative and engaging [...] It moved car advertising forward. To get such brand recognition without actually seeing the car was brilliant." Cake went on to win a slew of awards, including Golds at the British Television Advertising Awards and the Creative Circle Awards, and a Gold Lion at the Cannes Lions International Advertising Festival, one of the most prestigious awards of the marketing industry. According to the Gunn Report, Cake was the third-most-awarded television advertising campaign of 2008, behind Gorilla for Cadbury and The Power of Wind for Epuron.
