= We Care =

Studio album by Whale
- Released: 3 July 1995 (Europe)
- Genre: Alternative rock; trip hop
- Label: Virgin
- Producer: Whale; Falcon (tracks 6, 9 & 10); Tricky (tracks 1 & 8)

Whale chronology
We Care (1995)	Pay For Me (mini album) (1995)

We Care is the debut album by Swedish alternative rock group Whale. The album was produced by Whale; several tracks were produced in cooperation with Falcon or Tricky.

== Background and release ==
After forming an impromptu band, Gordon Cyrus, Henrik Schyffert, and Cia Berg recorded a music track. Released in May 1994 as "Hobo Humpin' Slobo Babe" on East West Records, it became a novelty hit, especially on MTV, where it received heavy rotation. It rose to number 24 on Billboard's Modern Rock chart. The word "slobo" was a mistranslation by the band, who meant to use the British slang word "sloane". After Warner Sweden declined to exercise their option on the band, Virgin signed them and released We Care on 3 July 1995 in Europe, 31 July in the UK, and 1 August in the United States. Schyffert described their collaboration style on the album as "scream[ing] out ideas". Though this resulted in a wide variety in styles and a difficult-to-describe album, he dismissed concerns that it was too confusing.

== Reception ==
Professional ratings
Review scores
Source	Rating
AllMusic	4.5/5 stars
Cash Box	(favorable)
Christgau's Consumer Guide	A−
Entertainment Weekly	B
The Guardian	4/5 stars
NME	8/10
Rolling Stone	4/5 stars

Sacha Jenkins of Vibe wrote, "Whale exhibits an alert grasp on the desires of the fast-food, on-line generation." Chris Molanphy of CMJ New Music Monthly wrote that while the album is fun, its lack of effort to be smart hampers the ability to take the band seriously. Robert Christgau rated it A− and wrote, "They're so good you have to think twice to remember which two tracks Tricky helped out on." Stephen Thomas Erlewine of Allmusic rated it 4.5/5 stars and wrote, "Taking elements of trip-hop beats, heavy metal guitars, sing-song pop, and football chants, the band creates a joyously noisy racket that emphasizes their humor and their sexiness." James Hunter of Rolling Stone rated it 4/5 stars and wrote, "The trio satisfies a raging appetite for distorted guitars while remembering punk and betraying an inevitable background in Abbaesque pop."

== Track listing ==
1. "Kickin'" (Whale/Tricky) – 3:47
2. "That's Where It's At" (Whale) – 4:15
3. "Pay for Me" (Whale) – 4:24
4. "Eurodog" (Whale) – 3:36
5. "I'll Do Ya" (Whale) – 8:26
6. "Electricity" (Christian Falk/P. Holmlund) – 4:13
7. "Hobo Humpin' Slobo Babe" (Whale) – 3:59
8. "Tryzasnice" (Whale/Tricky) – 4:45
9. "Happy in You" (P. Holmlund/Falcon/Whale) – 4:56
10. "I Miss Me" (Falcon/Whale/Neale) – 4:11
11. "Young, Dumb N' Full of Cum" – 5:14
12. "I'm Cold" (Whale) – 8:25
13. "Born to Raise Hell" (Whale) – 1:13
