= Whale (band) =

Swedish alternative rock group

- Origin: Sweden
- Genres: Alternative rock; experimental rock; electronic; trip hop
- Years active: 1992–1999
- Labels: Hut/Virgin
- Past members: Cia Berg; Henrik Schyffert; Gordon Cyrus; Jorgen Wall; Jon Jefferson Klingberg; Heikki Kiviaho

Whale was a Swedish alternative rock group active from 1992 to 1999.

== Career ==
Gordon Cyrus and Henrik Schyffert met while working on a commercial and decided to collaborate on a music track. Schyffert recruited his then-girlfriend, Cia Berg, to perform vocals. The band enjoyed some success, particularly in the European market. Their first single, 1993's "Hobo Humpin' Slobo Babe", was positively received by critics and received heavy spins in the Euro dance club scene and saturation airplay on MTV. It reached the Top 10 in Denmark and Norway, Top 30 in the Netherlands and Austria, Top 40 in Sweden, and No. 24 on the US Modern Rock Tracks chart. It also reached No. 46 on the UK Singles Chart in 1994, and when reissued in 1995, reached No. 15.

The music video for "Hobo Humpin' Slobo Babe", directed by Mark Pellington, won the first MTV Europe Music Award for Best Video in 1994.

Whale toured with Tricky, Blur and Placebo.

In the late 1990s, the band's official website stated that their original name was Southern Whale Cult 1987, and that several albums had previously been released under that name. This was later admitted to have been a joke; the band had copied a presentation by The Cult and simply changed the name of the band in the text.

Whale disbanded after the 1999 single "Deliver the Juice", to little fanfare.

== Post-breakup ==
Schyffert has pursued a television and comedy career, while Cyrus has worked in audiovisual marketing and design.

== Discography ==
=== Studio albums ===
- We Care (1995, Virgin Records/Hut Records)
- All Disco Dance Must End in Broken Bones (1998, Virgin/Hut)

=== Singles and EPs ===
Year	Single	Peak positions							Album
Year	Single	SWE	BEL (FLA)	NLD	SWI	UK	US	US Alter.	Album
1993	"Hobo Humpin' Slobo Babe"	30	13	17	22	46	102	24	We Care
1995	"Pay for Me"	6	—	—	—	—	—	—	We Care
1995	"I'll Do Ya"	—	—	—	—	53	—	—	We Care
1995	"Kickin'" (feat. Tricky) (US promo)	—	—	—	—	—	—	—	We Care
1995	"Hobo Humpin' Slobo Babe" (reissue)	—	—	—	—	15	—	—	We Care
1997	"Heavy Stick"	—	—	—	—	—	—	—	single only
1998	"Four Big Speakers" (feat. Bus 75)	50	—	—	—	69	—	—	All Disco Dance Must End in Broken Bones
1998	"Crying at Airports" (feat. Bus 75)	—	—	—	—	94	—	—	All Disco Dance Must End in Broken Bones
1999	"Deliver the Juice"	—	—	—	—	133	—	—	All Disco Dance Must End in Broken Bones
"—" denotes releases that did not chart or were not released.
