= Hobo Humpin' Slobo Babe =

1993 song by Whale

Single by Whale

from the album We Care
- B-side: "Lips"; "Eye 842"
- Released: 1993
- Genre: Alternative rock; funk; trip hop
- Length: 3:59
- Label: EastWest
- Songwriter: Whale
- Producer: Whale

Whale singles chronology
"Hobo Humpin' Slobo Babe" (1993)	"Pay for Me" (1995)

Music video
- "Hobo Humpin' Slobo Babe" on YouTube

"Hobo Humpin' Slobo Babe" is a song recorded by Swedish alternative rock band Whale, released in 1993 by East West Records as the debut single from the band's first album, We Care (1995). Written and produced by the band, the song received critical acclaim and achieved success particularly in Europe, reaching the top 10 in both Denmark and Norway, and the top 20 in Belgium, the Netherlands, and the UK, where it peaked at number 15. In the US, the single became a radio hit, after being played incessantly as an import by KROQ Los Angeles, peaking at number 24 on the Billboard Alternative Airplay chart. The accompanying music video was directed by Mark Pellington and was played frequently on MTV. It also won an award at the first MTV Europe Music Award in 1994.

== Background and lyrics ==
Bandmembers Gordon Cyrus and Henrik Schyffert met while working on a commercial and decided to collaborate on a music track. Schyffert recruited his then-girlfriend, Cia Berg, to perform vocals. They told Taylor Parkes from Melody Maker in 1995, "Sure, we formed the band more as an experiment than anything else. We went into the studio, made this single — we hadn't got any other songs and we'd never even thought about playing live — and suddenly people were telling us it was good, and they wanted to release it. 'OK', we said. And suddenly we were getting reviews like yours [notoriously hyperbolic Parkes singles review proclaiming "Hobo" as cure for all known diseases, greatest record ever made by Swedes, etc.]."

"Hobo Humpin' Slobo Babe" was both written and produced by the band. When asked about the meaning of the title, Schyffert told Dave Jennings from the same publication, "I heard that 'slobo' was a nickname for Chelsea girls. 'Hobo Humpin' Sloane Babe' would have been right. So there's a cute Swedish misunderstanding for you. We're the crappiest lyric writers in the world. We don't pretend to understand anything about it. But people have been getting too clever in this business. So we'll just be stupid."

== Critical reception ==
Larry Flick from Billboard magazine wrote, "Enigmatic trio from Stockholm, Sweden, comes on like a frantic hybrid of Björk, the Beastie Boys, and Onyx on this concoction of wailing guitars, live hip-hop beats, male gang chants, and jiggly female warbling. A truly left-of-center, wildly contagious gem that demands instant attention from college and alternative formats. Once popsters take a moment to get used to it, they'll find it a more than worthy playlist addition." Troy J. Augusto from Cash Box commented, "After slaying the European press with its wildly eclectic Beastie Boys/Sugarcubes/Ministry bastard sound. Whale have set their sights on the U.S., where alternative and college radio has already become hip to the Swedish trio’s unique, spastic sound. Male hip-hop vocals and rhythms, the tortured-angel voice of Cia Berg and gads of noises, samples and chaos make for an unusual track worth at least one listen. Give this one a chance." James Masterton for Dotmusic described it as "frantic, and frankly bizarre". A reviewer from Gavin Report felt it "have a sound that's a bit like The Sugarcubes meet the Red Hot Chili Peppers—unusual female vocals, solid beats and heavy on the funk." Ross Jones from The Guardian declared it as a "fantastic debut single", noting its "loud, heavily distorted guitars, synth-bass, and cooing girlie vocals". Caroline Sullivan from the newspaper felt the chorus "outdoes a footballers' stag party for oikishness". Taylor Parkes from Melody Maker named it Single of the Week, praising it as "staggering, a big funky-assed killmonster bellowing for the indescribable, answered back with the echoed yelps of an angel in a spacesuit".

Another Melody Maker editor, Michael Bonner, said, "Whale have style. They swagger, they growl, they rap, they funk, they rock, and all like a cross between Deee-Lite and the Beastie Boys. Cool." Pan-European magazine Music & Media commented, "Forget about Jaws and save the whale! An anarchic school of fish is swimming in an ocean of super heavy funk. Confidently in the middle is a weird hightone female singer with the impact of a spoilt brat." Music Week gave it a full score of five out of five, calling it a "quirky, sleezy debut" and "ace". Music Week editor Leo Finley wrote that it "was about a woman who sleeps with tramps for a laugh. It was one of the best singles of the year, crossing the groove of Deee-Lite with the power of the Beastie Boys at their best". Stephen Dalton from NME declared it as "a monstrous saga of sexual slumming perched atop a toxic tidal wave of scuzz-metal riffola." James Hunter from Rolling Stone said, "That single, a roar of uprooted funk and hoarse cheerleading, had people all over the world wondering just who the hell Whale were – perhaps a band that sounded like it should have its own jersey? What they are is three Swedish kids who confuse the rah-rah boisterousness of European sports events with the sonic and sexual abandon of American rock & roll." David Sinclair from The Times commented, "An enigmatic slogan which quickly turns into a riotous yobs' chorus, 'Hobo Humpin Slobo Babe' is a concentrated burst of meaningless frivolity swept along by a modish hip-hop beat and Berg's ludicrously echoed vocals." Sacha Jenkins from Vibe viewed it as "bright with obtuse lyrics, poppy symphonics, and a third-grade-ish shout-along chorus. Needless to say, 'Hobo' and the trio soon crept into my subconscious's subconscious."

== Music video ==
The music video for "Hobo Humpin' Slobo Babe" was directed by American film director, writer, and producer Mark Pellington and was made for about £300. It was played frequently on MTV, which showed the video every hour, and it was also awarded the first MTV Europe Music Award for "Best Video" in 1994. Support from MTV Europe played a key role in getting Whale out to a European audience. It was immediately added to their "Buzz Bin" rotation (approximately 18 plays a week) in the third week of January where it stayed for six weeks. Due to reaching chart positions in some European territories, the video was moved to the "Breakers" rotation.

Dave Sholin from the Gavin Report stated that "their video, like the song, is totally fresh". Dave Jennings from Melody Maker remarked singer Cia Berg, "who hams up the role of the nymphet in the video, and gets to inspect a line of anonymous hunks in short silver skirts". Machgiel Bakker from Music & Media complimented it as a "adventurous video". Leo Finley from Music Week commented, "They were the Swedish outfit with the shapely female lead singer baring her teeth braces to the world while the boys behind her showed off their Y-fronts." Stephen Dalton from NME wrote, "Here was a truly gob-smacking single, a scary yob-rap about tramp-shagging Sloane girls set to a slamcore groove. But the video was something else again, a huge dayglo dollop of shouty teenage lust and jackbooted punk-funk attitude. Clearly these chart-eating noiseniks were destined for world domination." David Sinclair from The Times said, "Singer Cia Berg now boasts the most famous teeth-brace in pop since making the video for this arresting song." Sacha Jenkins from Vibe wrote, "I can remember a time, about a year ago, when my local request-a-video station was blazing–over and over again–with the mindlessly juvenily escapades of this naive looking, lusty, churning chanteuse, and these two dudes who jumped up and down around her like they were playing some frantic game of one-on-one, with the girl's head serving as rim and back-board."

== Legacy ==
In 2017, Australian Double J ranked "Hobo Humpin' Slobo Babe" number 20 in their list of "The 50 Most Overlooked Songs of the 90s". Richard Kingsmill wrote, "This slamming track drove the energy levels skyward at many an indie club in the mid-90s. Whale came together more by chance than a grand masterplan. Two Swedish guys met while making a TV commercial, discovered a love of music and decided to collaborate. One of their girlfriends joined them to sing this bizarre, and potentially annoying, 1993 debut single. It was certainly hard to ignore, with its screaming chorus juxtaposed with Cia Berg's otherworldly and childlike vocals. It became a European hit, thanks to MTV flogging the video there, and eventually the single was re-issued around the world in 1995. They would tour supporting the likes of Blur and Placebo, but, by 1999, Whale disappeared beneath the surface, leaving behind this raucous sonic blast."

== Track listing ==
- 7" single, UK (1994)
1. "Hobo Humpin' Slobo Babe" — 4:00
2. "Lips" — 5:01
- CD single, Europe (1993)
1. "Hobo Humpin' Slobo Babe" — 3:59
2. "Lips" — 5:01
3. "Eye 842" — 4:25
- CD single, France & Benelux (1993)
1. "Hobo Humpin' Slobo Babe" — 4:00
2. "Lips" — 5:01
- CD single 1, UK (1995)
1. "Hobo Humpin' Slobo Babe" — 4:01
2. "You And Your Sister" — 5:18
3. "Singer Star" — 4:06
- CD single 2, UK (1995)
1. "Hobo Humpin' Slobo Babe" (Doggy Style by The Dust Brothers) — 4:37
2. "Hobo Humpin' Slobo Babe" (Sniffin' Plankton Mix by Monkey Mafia) — 6:46
3. "Hobo Humpin' Slobo Babe" (Skorpio Mix by Roni Size & DJ Die) — 5:11

== Charts ==
Chart (1993–95)	Peak position
Belgium (Ultratop 50 Flanders)	13
Europe (Eurochart Hot 100)	66
Netherlands (Dutch Top 40)	13
Netherlands (Single Top 100)	17
Scotland (OCC)	17
Sweden (Sverigetopplistan)	30
Switzerland (Schweizer Hitparade)	22
UK Singles (Official Charts)	15
US Billboard Bubbling Under Hot 100	2
US Modern Rock Tracks (Billboard)	24

== Usage in media ==
The song appeared in an episode of the animated television series Beavis and Butt-Head in 1995.
