= Gone (2007 film) =

- Official poster
- Directed by: Ringan Ledwidge
- Written by: Andrew Upton; James Watkins
- Produced by: Deborah Balderstone; Nira Park
- Starring: Shaun Evans; Scott Mechlowicz; Amelia Warner
- Cinematography: Ben Seresin
- Edited by: Chris Dickens
- Music by: David Bridie
- Production companies: FFC Australia; StudioCanal; Working Title Films; WT^{2} Productions
- Distributed by: Universal Pictures
- Release dates: 9 March 2007 (UK); 19 July 2007 (Australia)
- Running time: 88 minutes
- Countries: United Kingdom; Australia
- Language: English
- Box office: $88,748

Gone is a 2007 psychological horror film starring Shaun Evans and Amelia Warner as a young British couple travelling through the Australian outback who become involved with a mysterious and charismatic American (Scott Mechlowicz) whose motive for imposing his friendship upon them becomes increasingly suspect.

Directed by Ringan Ledwidge in his directorial debut, the film was produced by Universal Pictures, Australian Film Finance Corporation (AFFC), StudioCanal, Working Title Films, and WT^{2} Productions.

== Plot ==
Alex (Shaun Evans) arrives in Sydney. Realising he has missed his bus, he is reading his travel guide on stone steps in the street, when Taylor (Scott Mechlowicz) suddenly sits near Alex and makes small talk with him, insisting that he come with him. After drinking and raucously horsing around with two unnamed girls, Alex awakens in a city park with Taylor standing over him with a Polaroid camera, snapping a photo of Alex with one of the girls they met that night. When driving out of town in Taylor's vehicle, Alex reveals that he is to be in Byron Bay to meet his girlfriend Sophie (Amelia Warner) and Taylor suggests that they travel together. When Alex and Taylor meet Sophie, she is with Ingrid (Zoe Tuckwell-Smith), a German tourist. The four of them head towards Katherine Gorge in the Northern Territory. The following day, about to leave, Taylor vaguely mentions that Ingrid had to meet someone and had caught a bus, with Alex and Sophie unamused. They then go back to a day of countryside driving and camp for the night in heavy rain, with Alex and Sophie sleeping in the tent and Taylor is in the vehicle. Taylor unexplainably turns on the headlights, lighting up the tent, and Alex gets out and watches Taylor drive away, coming back the next day, with the three of them in a field on a clear day. They then go to a party at a bar and a woman there recognizes him, calling him; "Jamie from Thailand", confronts him for being criminally defrauded and jilted with Taylor initially claiming she's mistaken and then head swipes the woman with a vulgar disregard. The three then stay in a trailer.

After a day of driving, Alex sustains a major head wound in a collision with a kangaroo herd. They stop at a motel and Sophie and Taylor get him medic supplies and allow him to recuperate. Then after driving, Alex frustrated at the inanity of the trip attacks Taylor, knocking him down and kicking him, with Sophie placating him, citing the need to finish the trip. After talking with Taylor, Sophie then goes to look for Alex, but the room is empty, and he texts her saying, "I'm going." Sophie tries to convince Taylor to go look for him, but they end up waiting the night.

The next day, they head toward the next town. Taylor says that they should pull over and rest. They spend the night together and in the morning, Sophie attempts to text Alex. The phone in Taylor's pocket lights up. The next morning, Sophie claims that Ingrid texted her to meet them at Katherine Gorge. Taylor and Sophie start arguing, and he begins menacing Sophie, further agitating her. She runs off, and Taylor follows her. She then dashes to the vehicle, Taylor still in pursuit. Sophie successfully gets in the car locking Taylor locked out. He attempts to punch and kick the window in. Sophie drives into Taylor, with him sliding off to the side, which pops open the back door open. The lifeless body of Alex in a sleeping bag falls out. Sophie stops in horror, allowing Taylor to jump in the back. She continues driving, with Taylor attempting to unscrew the wire mesh that separates them, and arguing that she has no romantic feelings for him. After loosening a side of the mesh, he attempts to enter the cab and Sophie slams the brakes with the wire mesh edges piercing him. She accelerates and brakes repeatedly, further ripping him open, before he falls out of the car. She looks back and he gets up, still alive. She then accelerates backwards and fatally rams him, before driving on, sobbing.

== Cast ==
- Shaun Evans as Alex
- Scott Mechlowicz as Taylor
- Amelia Warner as Sophie
- Yvonne Strzechowski as Sondra
- Victoria Thaine as Lena
- Zoe Tuckwell-Smith as Ingrid

== Production ==
The film was shot in several locations in New South Wales and Queensland, Australia. Outback scenes were filmed near the towns of Longreach and Winton on the extensive "black soil" plains of western Queensland.

== Release ==
=== Box office ===
Gone grossed $88,748 at the Australian box office.

=== Critical reception ===
The film has a 54% approval rating on the review aggregator Rotten Tomatoes based on 13 reviews, with an average score of 5.65/10.

== See also ==
- Cinema of Australia
