= Gordon Cyrus =

- Born: Gordon Campbell Cyrus; 18 December 1966 (age 59); Djursholm, Sweden
- Genres: Rock, hip hop, reggae, soul, funk, afro punk
- Occupation: Musician
- Years active: 1990-present

Gordon Campbell Cyrus is a Swedish musician, record producer, sound engineer, and designer. Cyrus was a member of the rock/pop group Whale along with Cia Berg and Henrik Schyffert, and discovered The Latin Kings. He was a member of the 90's Swedish hip hop scene.

In the early '90s he founded urban music label Breakin' Bread together with Ayodele "DJ Rock Ski" Shekoni, Desmond Foster, Damon "D-Frost" Frost, Daddy Boastin, Leafnuts, Aaron Phiri, Hearin' Aid, Freddie "Red Astaire" Cruger, Ayodele Ajayi Eriksson aka Ayo and Adam Jewelle Baptiste aka ADL.

Cyrus has produced Addis Black Widow, Calypso Rose, Cheb Mami, China Moses, Shuba-K, Daara J Family, Jean-Louis Aubert, The Latin Kings, Whale. He mixed and engineered for Absent Minded, Addis Black Widow, Nils Landgren's Funk Unit, Magnum Coltrane Price, Ikiz, Aline de Lima, and Calypso Rose.

Cyrus has also worked as a music video director and worked with Blacknuss Allstars, soul singer Eric Gadd, The Latin Kings, Stonefunkers and D-FE.
