= The Bike Ride =

1973 British television commercial directed by Ridley Scott

Boy on the Bike
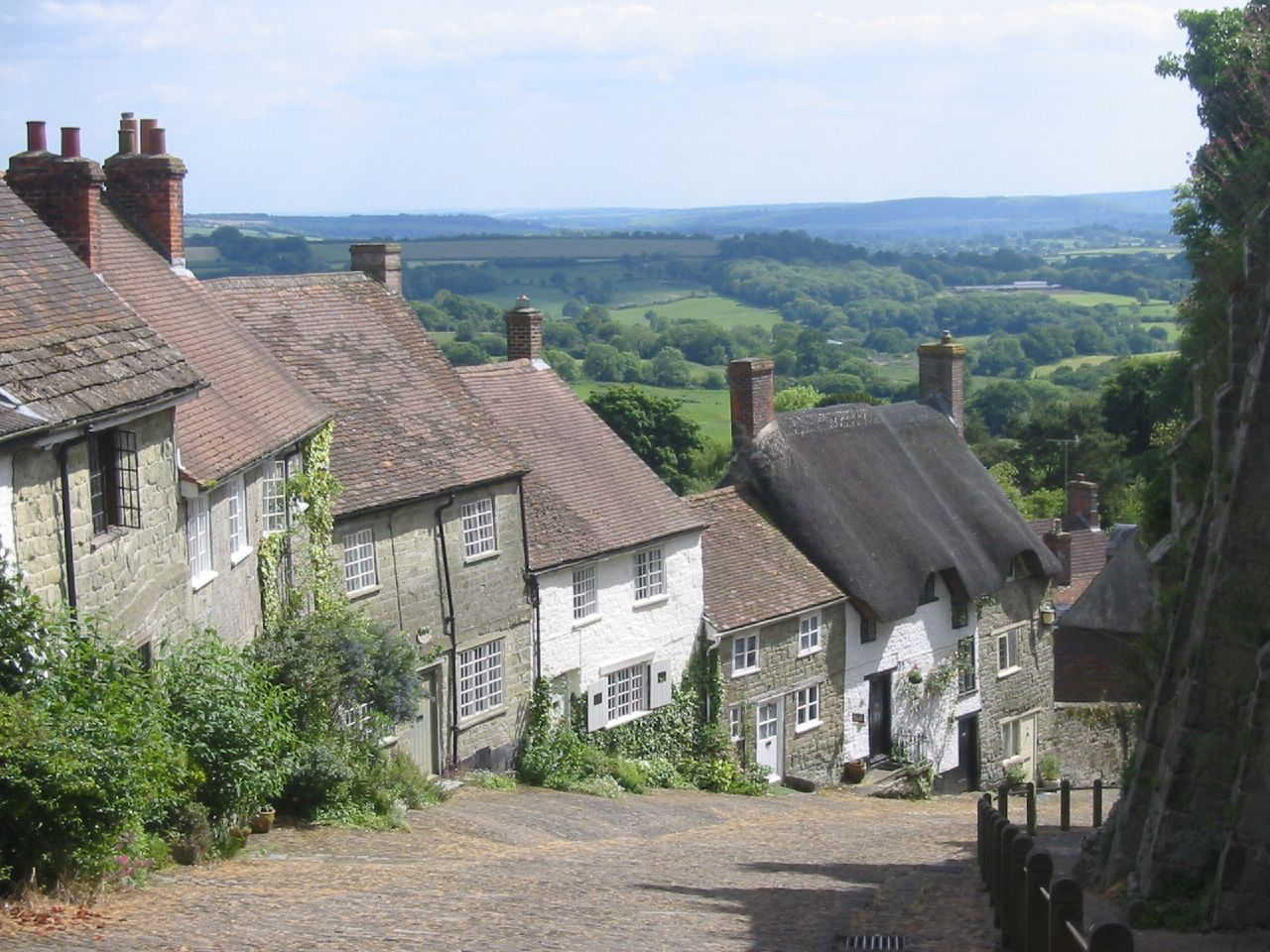
- Gold Hill in Shaftesbury, Dorset, where the advert was filmed.
- Client: Hovis
- Language: English
- Running time: 0:47
- Release date: 1973
- Directed by: Ridley Scott
- Starring: Carl Barlow
- Production company: Ridley Scott Associates
- Country: United Kingdom

The Bike Ride, Bike Round or Boy on the Bike is a 1973 advert for the bread maker Hovis. Ridley Scott directed the advert.

== Production ==
II. Largo
The largo from Dvořák's Symphony No. 9 "From the New World", here performed by "The Musopen Symphony Orchestra", a version of which, played by the Ashington Colliery Band, is used in the advert

Boy on the Bike was one of five adverts that Ridley Scott directed for Hovis in the early 1970s.

The advert shows a boy (played by Carl Barlow) pushing a bicycle laden with bread up a picturesque English cobbled street. A voiceover nostalgically describes the trip, while a recording of the largo from Dvořák's Symphony No. 9 "From the New World" is played by the Ashington Colliery Band.

Despite the common belief that it was set in the North of England, the advert was filmed on Gold Hill, Shaftesbury in Dorset; the voiceover is narrated in a West Country accent. It has been speculated that the misidentification of location could be because of the strong association of brass bands with "northernness".

== Reception ==
The advert has frequently been named one of Britain's most loved adverts. In 2006 it was voted the nation's favourite advertisement of all time. It was chosen as the best advert of the 1970s in a 2018 YouGov poll. In 2019 it was named the most iconic and heartwarming advert of the past 60 years to that point.

The advert's popularity has been attributed to its nostalgia for "wholesome images of village life" as well as Scott's visual direction. Gold Hill, where the advert was filmed, has since become a popular location for films and merchandise. A memorial to Hovis now stands at the top of the hill.

Hovis and the BFI restored the advert for use in 2019 in what was seen as an attempt to unite a divided nation. It was criticised by Sussex University Marketing Professor Michael Beverland for reminding those who voted to remain in the Brexit referendum of how little they had in common with those who voted to leave.
