= Old Lions =

- a frame from Old Lions
- Agency: Saatchi & Saatchi
- Client: Carlsberg Group
- Language: English
- Running time: 180 seconds
- Product: Carlsberg pale lager
- Release date: 15 April 2006
- Directed by: Chris Palmer
- Starring: Alan Ball Peter Beardsley Terry Butcher Bobby Charlton Jack Charlton Stuart Pearce Peter Reid Bobby Robson Bryan Robson Peter Shilton Chris Waddle Des Walker
- Production company: Gorgeous Enterprises
- Produced by: Mana Franzini; Jennifer Kennedy
- Country: United Kingdom
- Preceded by: Chinese
- Followed by: BBQs
- Official website: http://www.carlsberg.co.uk/

Old Lions is a British television and cinema advertisement launched by the Carlsberg Group in 2006 to promote Carlsberg-brand pale lager. The 180-second piece formed the cornerstone of the company's media campaign in England during the run-up to the 2006 FIFA World Cup. The campaign targeted men between the ages of 16 and 34. The commercial shows the lead up to and playing of a game of football between a local pub team and a team made up of former England players, coached by Bobby Robson. Old Lions was handled by advertising agency Saatchi & Saatchi. It was directed by Chris Palmer. Production was handled by production company Gorgeous Enterprises, with post-production by The Mill. It premiered on British television on 15 April 2006.

Old Lions is the seventh television/cinema piece in the World According to Carlsberg series. The advertisement, and its associated campaign, was a huge critical and popular success. It received dozens of awards from professional organisations within the television and marketing industries, and in 2010 was voted one of the top ten advertisements of the decade by the British public. The interactive element of the television commercial proved a huge success, with more viewers spending a significant portion of time watching content than any previous interactive television campaign.

== Sequence ==
Old Lions opens to the team waking up and going through their pre-game morning routines; Peter Shilton yawning and getting out of bed, Alan Ball smelling his socks for freshness, Terry Butcher buying bacon sandwiches. The team arrive at the grounds and go listen to a pre-game talk by Bobby Robson, interrupted by Stuart Pearce receiving a call from his mother. They file out to face a local pub team (played by employees of the production companies.) Peter Beardsley scores the first goal, followed by several others. Jack Charlton receives a yellow card for shirt-pulling. Shilton saves a shot from a free kick and more goals are scored, with the Lions winning the game 8-0. The team celebrate at a pub called the "Old Lion", as a narrator provides the strapline - "Carlsberg don't do pub teams. But if they did, they'd probably be the best pub team in the world."

== Production ==
=== Pre-production ===
Carlsberg became an official sponsor of The Football Association in 1995, following several years as a sponsor of individual clubs. In exchange for providing finance, Carlsberg were entitled to run a number of promotions and competitions tying in with the players. As part of the company's £25m annual advertising spend Carlsberg sought to put their stamp on the 2006 FIFA World Cup, the biggest football event of the year. However, the campaign had to be produced without using any FIFA trademarks or even mentioning the words "World Cup", as Carlsberg were not an official sponsor of the event.

Saatchi & Saatchi, the advertising agency responsible for marketing Carlsberg in the UK, solicited ideas from their teams of creative directors and copywriters, eventually settling on a pitch written by creative directors Dave Henderson and Richard Denney, who had previously worked together on the successful Idle Thumbs campaign for Virgin Mobile. The campaign, titled Old Lions, was to primarily target men between the ages of 16 and 34 with a continuation of the successful "World According to Carlsberg" campaign with a piece around a dream team of former England national football players playing a match against a local pub team.

Henderson and Denney put the team together, and were largely given free rein for their choices. However, given that the piece was to promote a brand of lager, it was felt that the use of players with a history of alcoholism, such as Tony Adams or Paul Gascoigne would be in poor taste. Once the list was assembled, the team began the long and arduous process of recruiting the players and finding a date before the World Cup on which none had prior commitments. According to Henderson: "[The team would] get 10 of them, but not the 11th, and then we'd get 11, and then one of them wouldn't be sure. We were talking people into doing it for about two or three months." The final selection for the team was: Peter Shilton (1), Des Walker (2), Terry Butcher (3), Jack Charlton (4), Stuart Pearce (5), Peter Reid (6), Bryan Robson (7), Alan Ball (8), Bobby Charlton (9), Peter Beardsley (10), and Chris Waddle (11), with Bobby Robson as coach. In all, the assembled team have 796 international caps between them.

=== Production ===
For the production of the commercial itself, Saatchi & Saatchi hired production company Gorgeous Enterprises, who assigned Chris Palmer as director of the project. Palmer's previous work included the highly successful Kicking It campaign for Adidas and a live-action version of the opening sequence to The Simpsons. Filming took place over two days in November 2005 in Dagenham, a suburb of London. Footage of the football game itself was collected on one day (with filming beginning at 6:00am) as several players had prior commitments. Very little of the banter or in-game action was scripted, as it was felt that the footballers would lack the required acting skills. Among the few scripted moments were the booking of Jack Charlton for shirt-pulling, the scene with Alan Ball's smelly socks, and Pearce receiving a phone-call in the changing room.

In all, six hours of football and nine hours of unscripted banter were filmed. The unused footage was edited into a making-of documentary and an outtake featurette, both of which aired online and through interactive television. Additional scripted 20-second segments were filmed to complement the full commercial, which would run throughout the World Cup. These included Bobby Robson going over tactics, and the team singing in the pub.

== Release and reception ==
List of awards

British Television Advertising Awards
- Gold - Alcoholic Drinks
- Gold - Over 90 Second TV Commercial
- Gold - Commercials Shown In Cinema Which Are Adaptations Of Television Commercials
British Television Craft Awards
- Winner - Best Direction
- Shortlist - Best Editing
Channel 4 TV Planning Awards
- Winner - Special Commendation
Creative Circle Awards
- Gold - Best Cinema Advertisement
- Gold - Best Idea in 60 Seconds or over
- Silver - Best Dialogue
- Silver - Best Editing
- Silver - Best Illustration
- Silver - Best Television Advertisement
- Bronze - Best Campaign or Series
- Bronze - Best Direction
- Bronze - Best Interactive Television Advertisement
Eurobest Awards
- Gold - Alcoholic Drinks
International ANDY Awards
- Bronze - Beverages, Alcoholic
- Bronze - Best Use of a Celebrity
Kinsale Sharks Awards Advertising Festival
- Silver - Alcoholic Drinks: Beer
Sports Industry Awards
- Shortlisted - Best Integrated Marketing Campaign
- Shortlisted - Best TV Sport Commercial
- Shortlisted - Best Use of PR in a Sport Campaign

=== Release ===
In order to stymie activity by competitors, and to maximise the brand's exposure, Saatchi & Saatchi launched the Old Lions campaign on 15 April, two months before the 9 June start date of the 2006 FIFA World Cup. The full 180-second commercial screened only three times, all on the first day of the campaign. After this, 60-second cuts continued to run through the opening weekend during every Premier League match. 40-second cuts continued to run throughout the World Cup coverage on a number of British terrestrial and satellite television channels, including ITV, Channel 4, Five, Bravo, Challenge, UKTVG2, Men & Motors, and especially Sky Sports. The final television broadcast of Old Lions was on 31 July 2006.

A significant portion of the budget (between £100,000 and £500,000) went into the creation of interactive content for Old Lions, allowing viewers to switch away from broadcasts of shorter versions to a dedicated advertising area where they could watch additional content, including the full three-minute commercial, a "making-of" documentary, outtakes, and additional scripted material. The service was available during commercial breaks until 26 June 2006, though the dedicated area remained open to click-throughs from 10-second cuts shown through the Sky Anytime service for some time.

=== Reception ===
Old Lions proved a huge commercial and critical success, and the interactive element of the campaign was singled out for particular praise. Indeed, Old Lions became the most successful interactive television campaign ever released; over 429,000 people clicked through to view additional content, double the number achieved by competing interactive campaigns launched by Budweiser and Carling in the run-up to the World Cup. Over 87% of viewers who clicked through spent more than a minute browsing the dedicated advertising area; the average viewer spent over four minutes, more than twice the average time spent on interactive sections of other commercials. Sixteen percent of households using the interactive option revisited the site on multiple occasions. Viewers who clicked through were 124% more likely to know that Carlsberg were an official sponsor of the England Football team. The website link shown at the end of the commercial, oldlions.com, received 390,000 hits during the World Cup, and Old Lions spent two weeks at the number 1 position on the Google Video download chart. It was estimated that to achieve the same exposure without the interactive option would have cost more than two and a half times the final budget of the campaign. As it was, Saatchi & Saatchi spent less than £0.36 to get a viewer to spend over four minutes engaging with the brand.

The financial success of the campaign was unparalleled in Carlsberg's history, outperforming its previous highest earning campaign by over 30 percent. Over 30,000,000 pints of Carlsberg lager were sold in the four weeks prior to the World Cup, and sales within the United Kingdom were four times higher than normal. Carlsberg outsold the market leader (Carling) by over 3,000,000 pints, and grew 33% faster than the draught lager category. 23% of British people drinking Carlsberg on the day of the first England match reported that they had switched to the brand as a consequence of the campaign.

The campaign was lauded by the advertising and marketing communities, receiving dozens of awards, including golds from the British Television Advertising Awards and the Eurobest Awards. Its financial success was noted, and led to other brands exploring options in interactive television marketing. The impact of Old Lions was such that in 2009, the British public voted it one of the top ten television advertisements of the decade. Director Chris Palmer went on to direct the 2007 Cake television advertisement for Škoda Auto, before switching his focus to producing feature films. Saatchi + Saatchi continue to promote Carlsberg through the "World According to Carlsberg" campaign as of 2010, releasing the next television piece (BBQs) in 2007.
