= Black sugar =

Particulate by-product of burning coal

Black sugar is a form of crystalline precipitate or a particulate pollution by-product unique from creosote caused by the burning of low grade coal in the 1940–1960s. The outgas from burning coal would be a by-product (burning coal was used in residential forced hot air furnaces) for the heating of family housing. Black sugar was often found on porches and the cold ductwork and caused the high carbon, soot-loaded gas to precipitate on the floors and walls and crystallize. Outward appearance was that of very fine, shiny coal, but would not combust when exposed to flames. After a time, the crystalline material would become powdered, to the consistency of white cane sugar, but retain a fine, shiny, black texture, thus the name "black sugar". The material would often be cleaned from duct work by chimney sweeps or cleaning staff on a regular basis in the Beaver-Ambridge-Monaca area of Pennsylvania along the Ohio River near Pittsburgh.

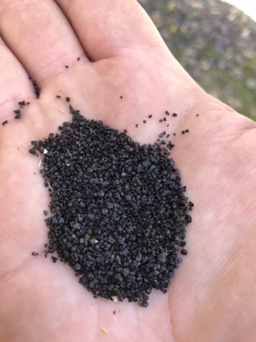
Black sugar precipitate recovered from heating duct in house in Beaver, PA, USA in 2018
