= Hovis =

British company that produces flour and bread

Hovis Ltd
- Type: Subsidiary
- Industry: Food
- Founded: 1886; 140 years ago in Macclesfield, United Kingdom
- Headquarters: High Wycombe, Buckinghamshire
- Key people: Jon Jenkins CEO
- Products: Bread, flour
- Owner: Associated British Foods
- Website: www.hovis.co.uk

Hovis Ltd is a British company that produces flour, yeast and bread. Created by miller Richard "Stoney" Smith at his small mill in Stone, Staffordshire (Smith's mill still exists, behind the town's Morrisons supermarket), it began mass-production when Smith partnered with the larger Fitton & Sons mill in Macclesfield in 1886.

Hovis specialises in high wheatgerm wholemeal flour, the bread being baked independently. It also produces the Nimble brand reduced-calorie bread.

Hovis has been owned by Associated British Foods since July 2026.

== History ==
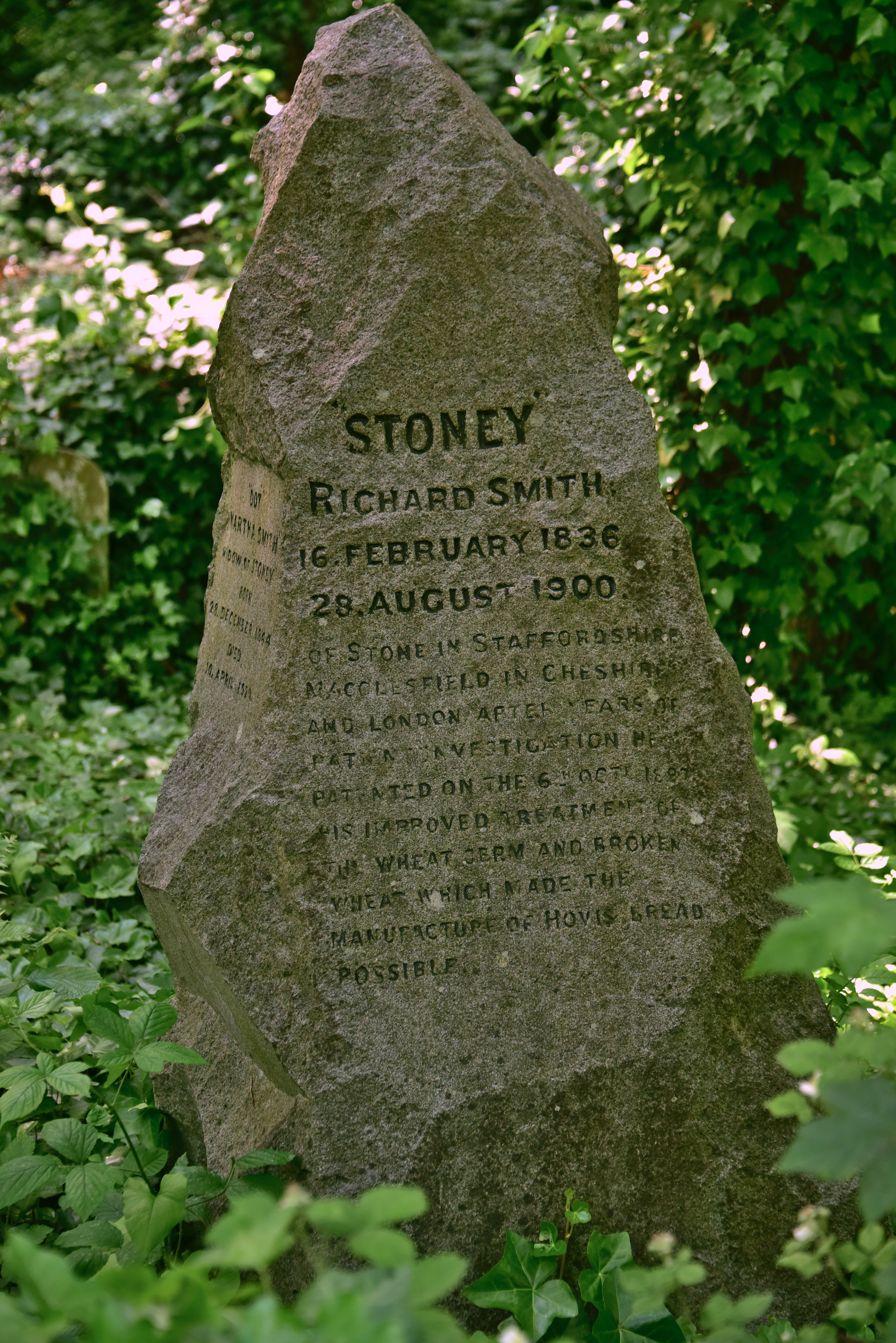
Grave of Richard "Stoney" Smith in Highgate Cemetery. The inscription details his discovery of the "Hovis" process.

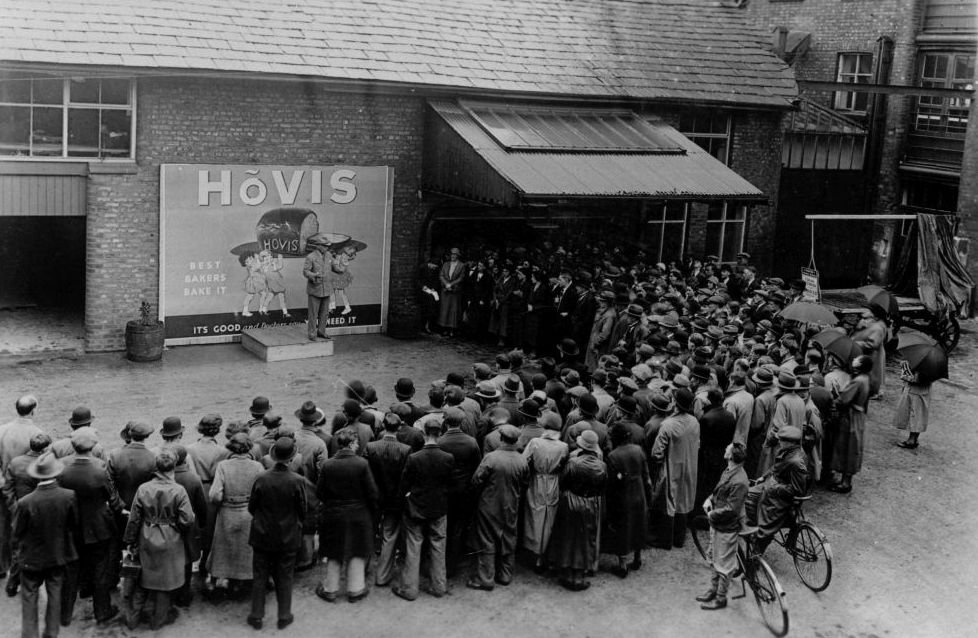
Hovis's managing director giving a pep talk to staff in 1935

The brand began in 1886; the Hovis process was patented on 6 October 1887 by Richard "Stoney" Smith (1836–1900), and S. Fitton & Sons Ltd developed the brand, milling the flour and selling it along with Hovis-branded baking tins to other bakers. The name was coined in 1890 by London student Herbert Grime in a national competition set by S. Fitton & Sons Ltd to find a trading name for their patent flour which was rich in wheat germ. Grime won £25 when he coined the word from the Latin phrase hominis vis, "the strength of man". The company became the Hovis Bread Flour Company Limited in 1898.

When the abundance of certain B vitamins in wheatgerm was reported in 1924, Hovis increased in popularity.

Hovis became part of Rank Hovis McDougall (RHM) in 1962 after a succession of mergers. RHM, with its brands including Hovis and Mother's Pride, was acquired by Premier Foods in 2007. In April 2014 it became a limited company after Premier Foods sold a 51% stake in the business to The Gores Group to form a joint venture between the two companies.

In November 2020, it was announced that both the Gores Group and Premier Foods had sold their stakes in the business to British-based private equity firm Endless LLP.

In August 2025, Associated British Foods agreed to acquire Hovis for £75m, however it was expected to be brought before the Competition and Markets Authority. The takeover was completed in July 2026.

== Advertising ==
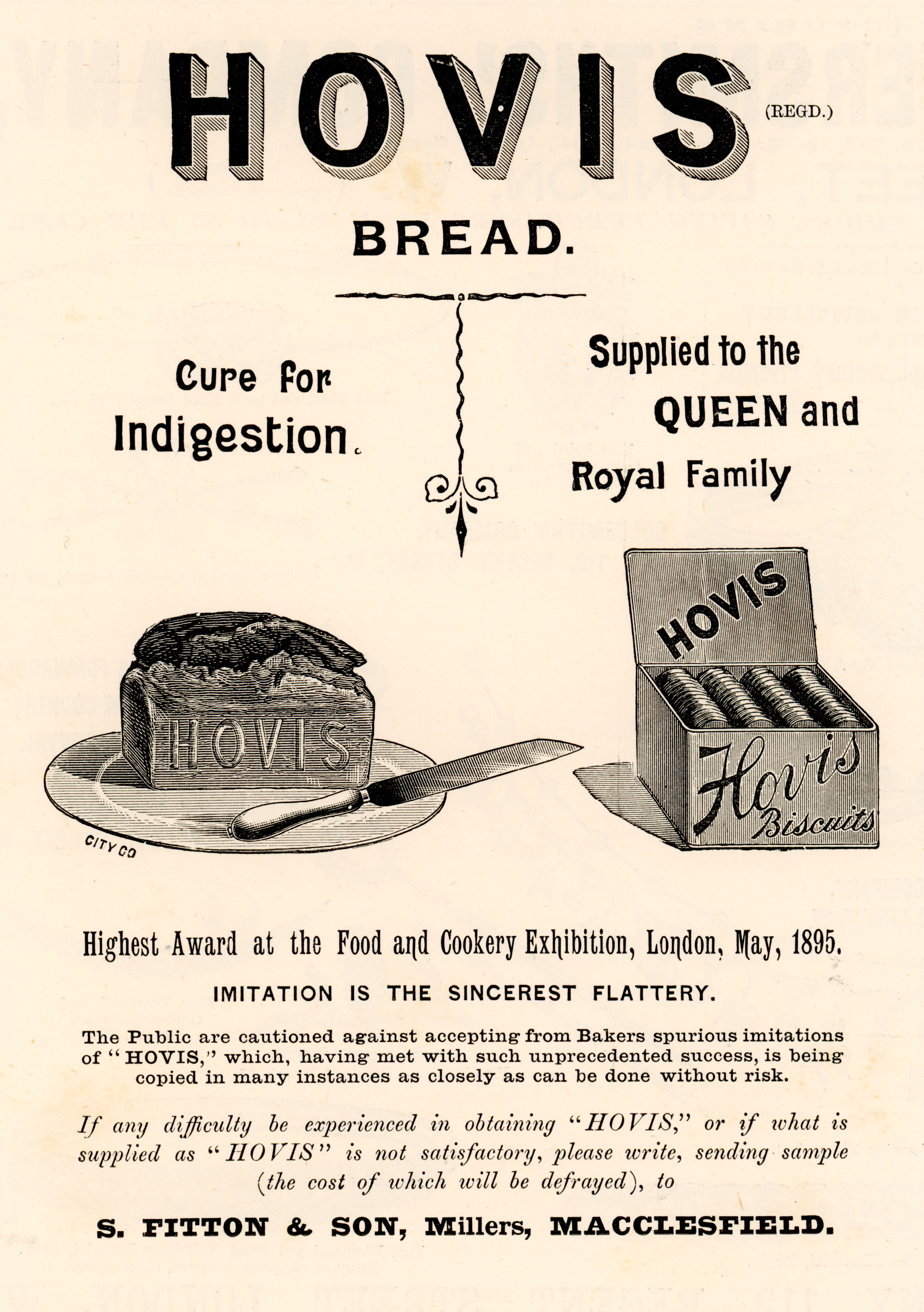
1895 Advertisement for Hovis Bread

In 1915, when the London and South Western Railway inaugurated their first electric train services, they introduced alphabetical head-codes in lieu of the traditional discs used on steam locomotives so that the general public could more easily identify their train. A 1926 advertisement widely deployed on the railways showed five such trains carrying headcodes H ō V I S along with an explanation (H-Hampton Court, ō-Hounslow, V-Kingston [V for Thames Valley], I-Dorking North & Effingham, and S-Shepperton). The "clockwise" Hounslow Loop head-code was a slightly height-reduced 'O' topped by a bar, accurately reflecting the same letter in HōVIS where the macron diacritical mark signifies the abbreviation of hominis.

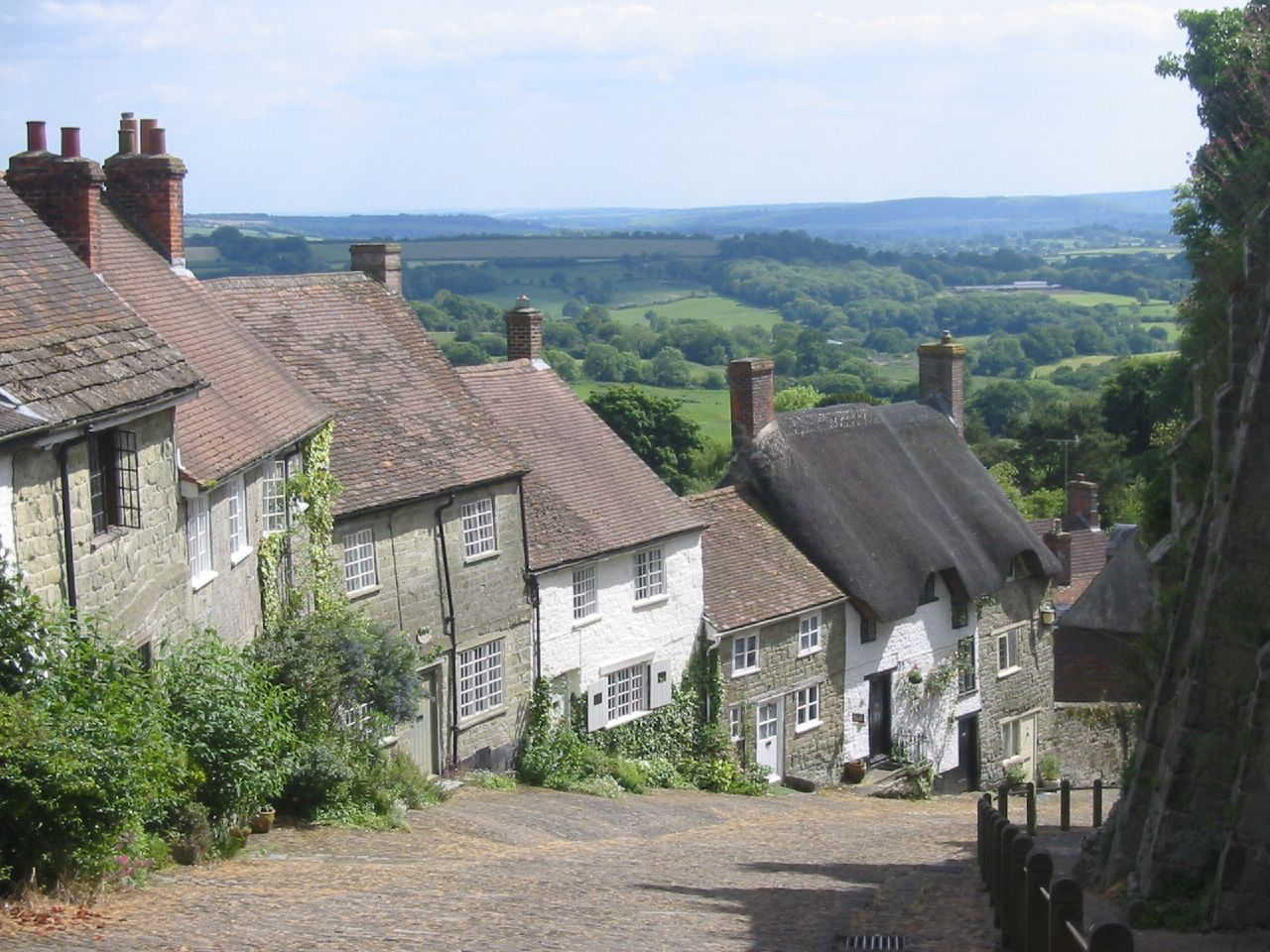
Gold Hill, Shaftesbury, where Ridley Scott filmed the 1973 Hovis commercial

In 1973, Hovis ran a television advertisement, Boy on the Bike, written by advertising agency Collett Dickenson Pearce and filmed by CDP's photographer Jack Bankhead under the direction of Ridley Scott, who later directed Alien. The advert featured the slow movement of Antonín Dvořák's Symphony No. 9 rearranged for brass. Filmed on Gold Hill in Shaftesbury, Dorset, Scott's advert has been voted Britain's favourite advertisement of all time. An original film print was restored by the BFI in 2019 and is available on their Advertising Collection.

This advertisement was repeated on British television for a 10-day run in May 2006 to commemorate the firm's 120th anniversary. The soundtrack had to be re-recorded to meet advertising standards. The boy on the bike, Carl Barlow, then aged 13, left acting and eventually became a firefighter in East Ham in 1979.

In 2008 Hovis departed from the "boy on a bike" format by commissioning Go On Lad, a retrospective advertisement documenting the 122 years of British history since the brand's launch. Go On Lad was voted "Advert of the Decade" by the British public in December 2009.

== Hovis map books ==
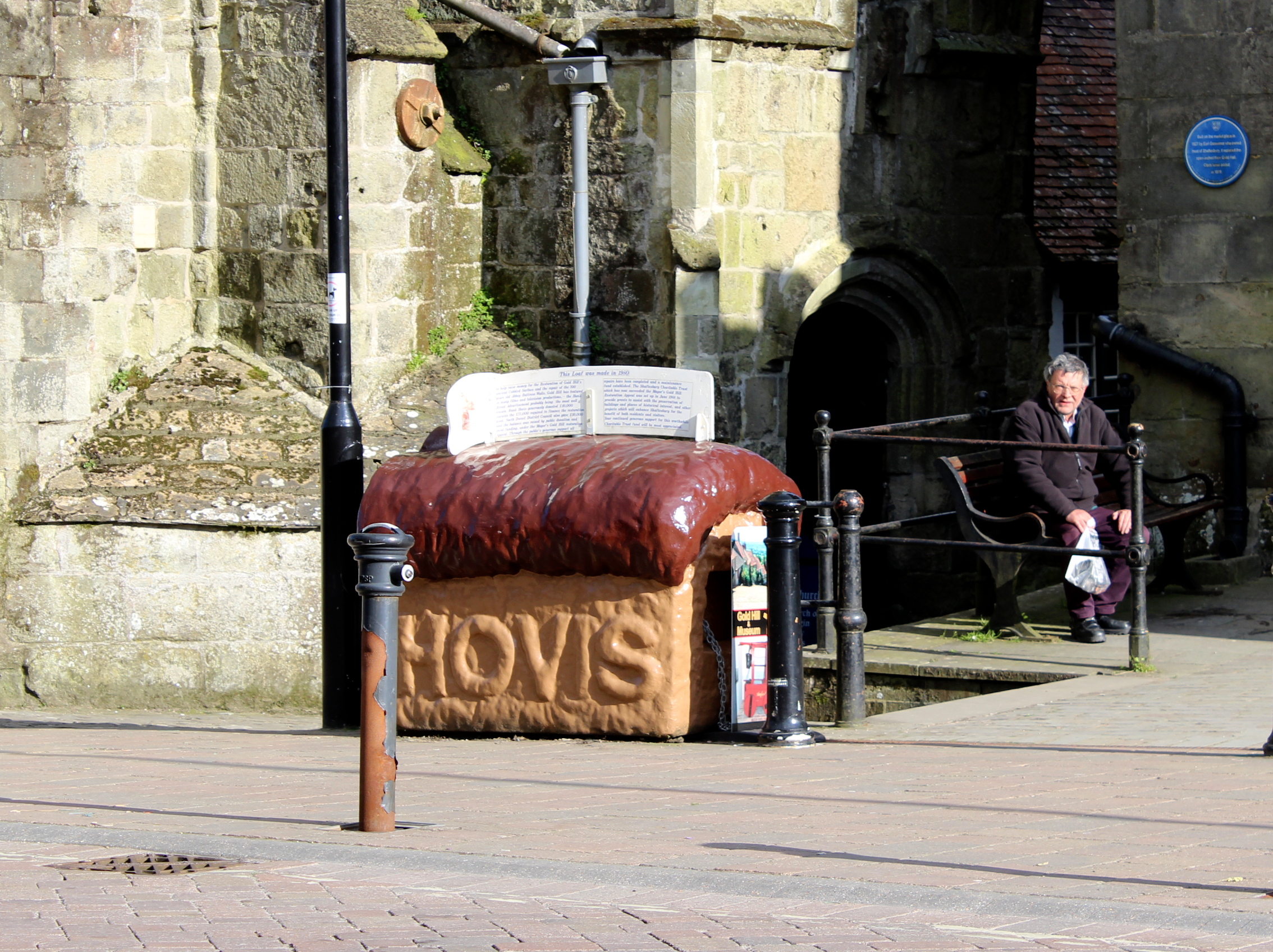
Hovis bread monument at Gold Hill

Hovis Ltd. published a series of map books which included advertisements for their products. In 1899 the company produced eight books of maps, covering England and Wales, designed for cyclists. In 1920 the company published Where to Go and How to Get There: Hovis Road Map of England, Wales and Scotland, and several versions of this book were later printed.

== Hovis biscuit ==
Since 1980, Hovis have licensed Jacob's to produce a digestive biscuit, branded as Hovis. Now a United Biscuits product, they are shaped like a miniature flat copy of the traditional Hovis loaf, and have the word "HOVIS" stamped on their top surface.

== The Bread Bag Recycling Programme ==
In a bid to help the environment and sustainability, Hovis collaborated with TerraCycle in The Bread Bag Recycling Programme. The objective of the programme is to drop-off used bread bags at public drop-off locations across the UK, or mail them to delivery services like those provided by UPS. These are all listed on an interactive map. After that the bags are recycled in a specialist plant. Those who take part in the programme are able to get TerraCycle points. These can be redeemed for a variety of charitable gifts or a payment to the non-profit organisation.
