= All Disco Dance Must End in Broken Bones =

Studio album by Whale
- Released: 1998
- Genre: Alternative rock; experimental rock; electronic
- Label: Virgin
- Producer: Chris Potter, Brad Wood

Whale chronology
Pay for Me (1995)	All Disco Dance Must End in Broken Bones (1998)

Professional ratings
Review scores
Source	Rating
AllMusic	4/5 stars
Robert Christgau	(dud)
Dayton Daily News	B+
Pitchfork	6.4/10
Scripps-Howard	4/5 stars

All Disco Dance Must End in Broken Bones is the second and final studio album by Swedish band Whale, released in 1998. It peaked at #13 on the weekly charts in its native Sweden, with the single "Four Big Speakers" reaching #50.

== Track listing ==
1. "Crying at Airports" – 5:22
2. "Deliver the Juice" – 5:11
3. "Roadkill" – 4:17
4. "Smoke" – 5:25
5. "Losing CTRL" – 4:12
6. "Four Big Speakers" – 3:52
7. "Go Where You’re Feeling Free" – 5:09
8. "Into the Strobe" – 6:09
9. "Puma Gym" – 2:51
10. "No Better" – 4:19
11. "2 Cord Song" – 7:19 (including the hidden track Subcultures in the USA)
