= Symphony No. 9 (Dvořák) =

1893 symphony by Antonín Dvořák

- From the New World
- by Antonín Dvořák
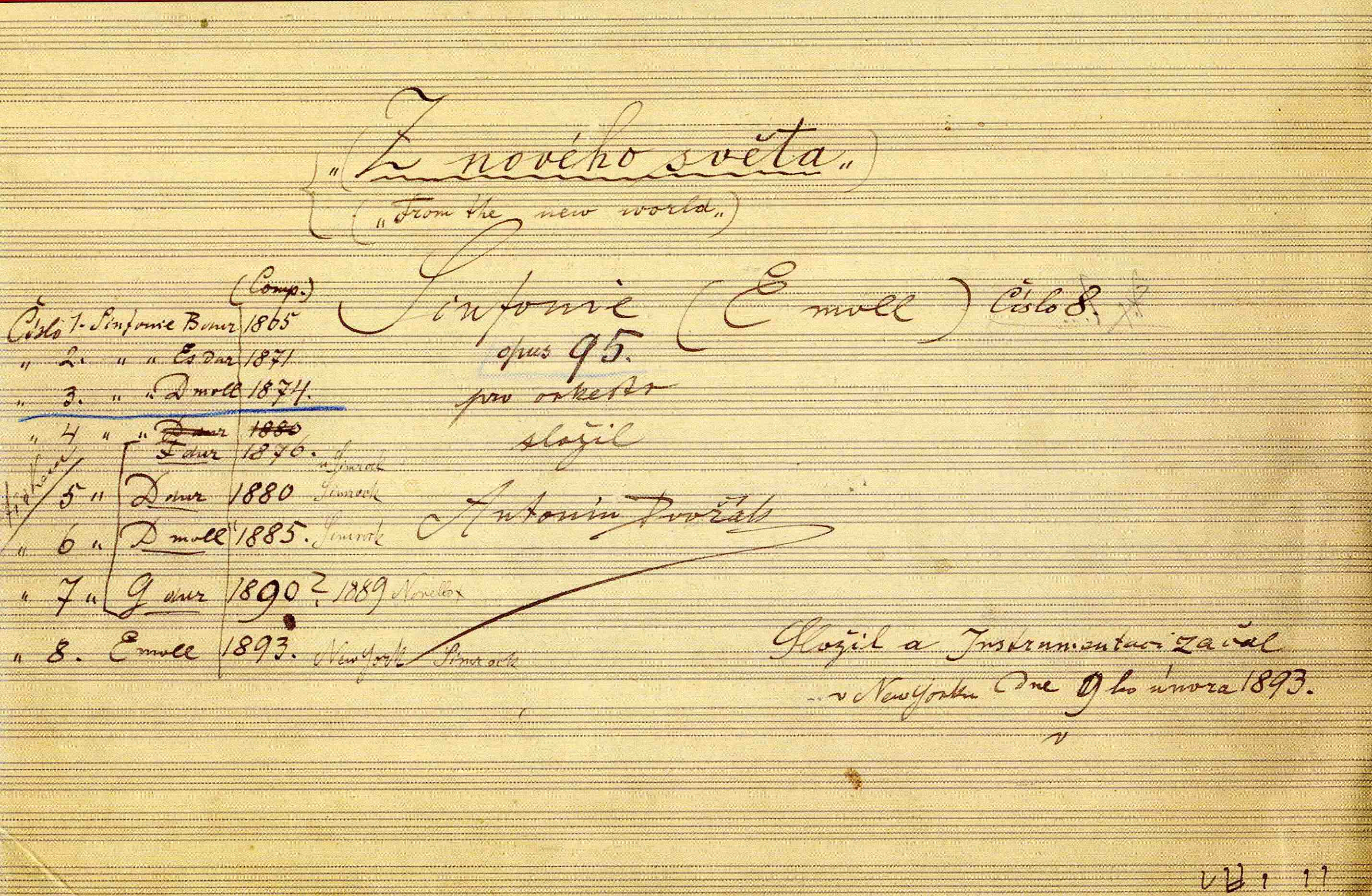
- Title page of the autograph score of Dvořák's ninth symphony
- Native name: Symfonie č. 9 e moll "Z nového světa"
- Other name: New World Symphony
- Key: E minor
- Catalogue: B. 178
- Opus: 95
- Composed: 1893
- Movements: 4
- Scoring: Orchestra

Premiere
- Date: December 16, 1893
- Location: Carnegie Hall, New York City
- Conductor: Anton Seidl
- Performers: New York Philharmonic

The Symphony No. 9 in E minor, "From the New World", Op. 95, B. 178 (Czech: Symfonie č. 9 e moll "Z nového světa"), also known as the New World Symphony, was composed by Antonín Dvořák in 1893 while he was the director of the National Conservatory of Music of America from 1892 to 1895. It premiered in New York City on December 16, 1893. It is one of the most popular of all symphonies. In older literature and recordings, this symphony was – as for its first publication – numbered as Symphony No. 5.

== Instrumentation ==
This symphony is scored for the following orchestra:

- 2 flutes (one doubling piccolo) (Note: The scoring of piccolo in this symphony is unusual; although the English horn is brought in for the solo in the second movement, the piccolo plays only a short phrase in the first, and nothing else.)
- 2 oboes (one doubling English horn)
- 2 clarinets in B♭ & A
- 2 bassoons
- 4 horns in E, C and F
- 2 trumpets in E
- 3 trombones: alto, tenor, bass
- Tuba (second movement only) (Note: Tuba is only scored in the second movement. According to the full score book published by Dover, Trombone basso e Tuba is indicated in some measures in the second movement; the bass trombone is used with the two other trombones in movements 1, 2 and 4.)
- Timpani
- Triangle (third movement only)
- Cymbals (fourth movement only)
- Strings

== Form ==
I. Adagio – Allegro molto

II. Largo

III. Scherzo: Molto vivace

IV. Allegro con fuoco

A typical performance usually lasts around 40 minutes. The work is in four movements:

1. Adagio, 4/8 – Allegro molto, 2/4, E minor, 452 measures
2. Largo,, D♭ major → C♯ minor → D♭ major, 127 measures
3. Scherzo. Molto vivace – Poco sostenuto, 3/4, E minor, Trio in C major, 300 measures
4. Finale. Allegro con fuoco,, E minor, ends in E major, 348 measures

=== I. Adagio – Allegro molto ===
The movement is written in sonata form and begins with an introductory melody in Adagio. This melodic outline also appears in the third movement of Dvořák's String Quintet No. 3 in E♭ major and his Humoresque No. 1. The exposition is based on three thematic subjects. The first in E minor is notable for its announcing and responsive phrases. The second is in G minor and undergoes a transformation such that it resembles a Czech polka. The exposition's closing theme in G major is known for being similar to the African-American spiritual "Swing Low, Sweet Chariot". The development primarily focuses on the main and closing themes, and the recapitulation consists of a repetition of the main theme as well as a transposition of the second and closing themes up a semitone. The movement is concluded with a coda, with the main theme stated by the brass above an orchestral tutti.

=== II. Largo ===
The second movement, written in ternary form, is introduced by a harmonic progression of chords in the wind instruments. Beckerman interprets these chords as a musical rendition of the narrative formula "Once upon a time".

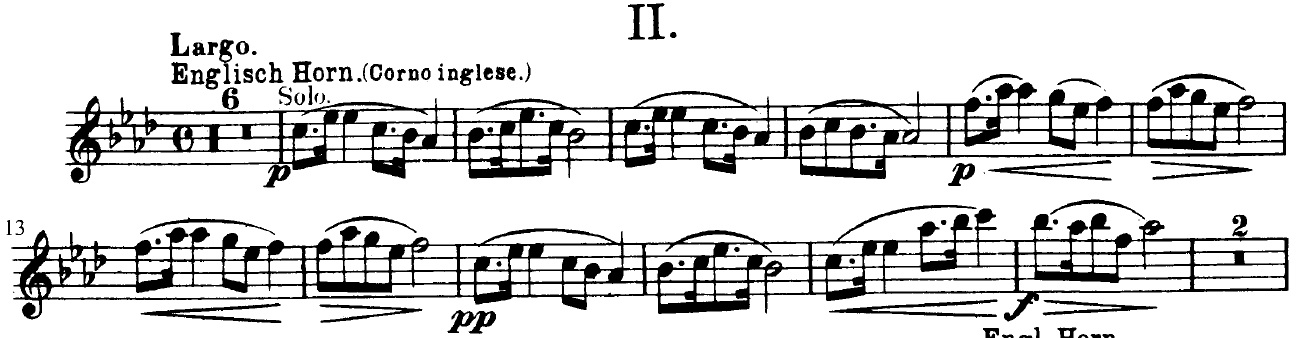
Opening English horn theme from the second movement of the work

Then a solo cor anglais (English horn) plays the famous main theme in D♭ major accompanied by muted strings. Dvořák was said to have changed the theme from clarinet to cor anglais as it reminded him of the voice of Harry Burleigh. The movement's middle section contains a passage in C♯ minor evoking a nostalgic and desolate mood which eventually leads into a funeral march above pizzicato steps in the basses. It is followed by a quasi-scherzo that incorporates this movement's theme as well as the first movement's main and closing themes. The Largo is concluded with the soft return of the main theme and introductory chords.

=== III. Scherzo. Molto vivace ===
The movement is a scherzo written in ternary form, with influences from Henry Wadsworth Longfellow's The Song of Hiawatha. The stirring rhythm of the first part is interrupted by a trio middle section. The first part is then repeated, followed by an echo in the coda of the first movement's main theme.

=== IV. Finale. Allegro con fuoco ===
The final movement is also written in sonata form. After a brief introduction, the horns and trumpets declare the movement's main theme against sharp chords played by the rest of the orchestra. The second theme is then presented by the clarinet above tremolos in the strings. The development not only works with these two themes but also recalls the main themes of the first and second movements and a fragment of the Scherzo. Following the recapitulation which begins in the unexpected key of G minor but later corrects itself back to the original key, the movement reaches its climax in the coda, in which materials from the first three movements are reviewed for the final time while the Picardy third is expanded after the orchestra triumphantly plays a "modally altered" plagal cadence. The main theme, especially its occurrence in bar 321, bears a close resemblance to the opening theme of the Hans Heiling Overture by Heinrich Marschner.

== Influences ==
Dvořák was interested in Native American music and the African-American spirituals he heard in North America. While director of the National Conservatory he encountered an African-American student, Harry T. Burleigh, who sang traditional spirituals to him. Burleigh, later a composer himself, said that Dvořák had absorbed their "spirit" before writing his own melodies. Dvořák stated:

I am convinced that the future music of this country must be founded on what are called Negro melodies. These can be the foundation of a serious and original school of composition, to be developed in the United States. These beautiful and varied themes are the product of the soil. They are the folk songs of America and your composers must turn to them.

The symphony was commissioned by the New York Philharmonic, and premiered on December 16, 1893, at Carnegie Hall conducted by Anton Seidl. A day earlier, in an article published in the New York Herald on December 15, 1893, Dvořák further explained how Native American music influenced his symphony:

I have not actually used any of the [Native American] melodies. I have simply written original themes embodying the peculiarities of the Indian music, and, using these themes as subjects, have developed them with all the resources of modern rhythms, counterpoint, and orchestral colour.

In the same article, Dvořák stated that he regarded the symphony's second movement as a "sketch or study for a later work, either a cantata or opera ... which will be based upon Longfellow's Hiawatha" (Dvořák never actually wrote such a piece). He also wrote that the third movement scherzo was "suggested by the scene at the feast in Hiawatha where the Indians dance".

In 1893, a newspaper interview quoted Dvořák as saying "I found that the music of the negroes and of the Indians was practically identical", and that "the music of the two races bore a remarkable similarity to the music of Scotland". Most historians agree that Dvořák is referring to the pentatonic scale, which is typical of each of these musical traditions.

In a 2008 article in The Chronicle of Higher Education, prominent musicologist Joseph Horowitz states that African-American spirituals were a major influence on Dvořák's music written in North America, quoting him from an 1893 interview in the New York Herald as saying, "In the negro melodies of America I discover all that is needed for a great and noble school of music." Dvořák did, it seems, borrow rhythms from the music of his native Bohemia, as notably in his Slavonic Dances, and the pentatonic scale in some of his music written in North America from African-American and/or Native American sources. Statements that he borrowed melodies are often made but seldom supported by specifics. One verified example is the song of the Scarlet Tanager in the Quartet. Michael Steinberg writes that a flute solo theme in the first movement of the symphony resembles the spiritual "Swing Low, Sweet Chariot". Leonard Bernstein averred that the symphony was truly multinational in its foundations.

Dvořák was influenced not only by music he had heard but also by what he had seen in America. He wrote that he would not have composed his American pieces as he had if he had not seen America. It has been said that Dvořák was inspired by the "wide open spaces" of America, such as prairies he may have seen on his trip to Iowa in the summer of 1893. Notices about several performances of the symphony include the phrase "wide open spaces" about what inspired the symphony and/or about the feelings it conveys to listeners. (Note: For example, the Chicago Symphony, June 19, 2009.)

Dvořák was also influenced by the style and techniques used by earlier classical composers including Beethoven and Schubert. The falling fourths and timpani strokes in the New World Symphony's Scherzo movement evoke the Scherzo of Beethoven's Choral Symphony (Symphony No. 9). The use of quotations of prior movements in the symphony's final movement is reminiscent of Beethoven quoting prior movements in the opening Presto of the Choral Symphony's final movement.

== Reception ==
At the premiere in Carnegie Hall, the end of every movement was met with thunderous clapping and Dvořák felt obliged to stand up and bow. This was one of the greatest public triumphs of Dvořák's career. When the symphony was published, several European orchestras soon performed it. Alexander Mackenzie conducted the London Philharmonic Society in the first London performance on 21 June 1894. Clapham says the symphony became "one of the most popular of all time" and at a time when the composer's main works were being welcomed in no more than ten countries, this symphony reached the rest of the musical world and has become a "universal favorite". As of 1978, it had been performed more often "than any other symphony at the Royal Festival Hall, London" and is in "tremendous demand in Japan".

The American astronaut Neil Armstrong took a tape recording including the New World Symphony along during the Apollo 11 mission, the first Moon landing, in 1969. In the UK, the largo became familiar to the general public after its use in a 1973 television advert directed by Ridley Scott for the Hovis bakery. The largo is the main music theme in the 1984 film Crimes of Passion.

Professional wrestlers Gunther and Mercedes Moné have used an excerpt from the fourth movement in their respective entrance themes

== Performance history ==
List of performances during Dvořák's life:

- New York, United States of America: December 16, 1893
- London, Great Britain: June 21, 1894
- Carlsbad, Austria-Hungary: July 20, 1894
- Prague, Austria-Hungary: October 13, 1894, conducted by Dvořák himself at the National Theatre

== "Goin' Home" ==
"Goin' Home"
Performed by the United States Air Force Band

The theme from the Largo was adapted into the spiritual-like song "Goin' Home" (often mistakenly considered a folk song or traditional spiritual) by Dvořák's pupil William Arms Fisher, who wrote the lyrics in 1922.
