= Addis Black Widow =

Swedish band

Addis Black Widow is a Swedish band. Their songs include "Innocent", "Wait in Summer" and "Goes Around Comes Around" which reached #2 on the Swedish Tracks Chart in 2001. The single "Innocent" reached #42 in the UK Chart in 1996. Two years later they, under the moniker Bus 75, reached #69 in the UK Chart guesting on the song "Four Big Speakers" by Swedish rock band Whale.

In 2007, the group entered Melodifestivalen's first semifinal with the song "Clubbin". The group finished last and did not make it to the finals. Band member "Cream", who lives in London, did not participate. Since 2008 Addis Black Widow has been a hip hop act led by Pigeonmun, one of the founders and the main producer/composer. Other bands associated with Addis Black Widow are Raw Meat Productions Hb and Surreal entertainment Db. The music is a mixture of hip hop, rap, and pop music Pigeonmun calls "hip pop".

== Members ==
The Black Widow started with the original members from the rap group Puffy MC & Jah Rock combined with Da Cream. Although their backgrounds stretch from Ethiopia to Iran to Oakland, California, the band recorded their first album (The Battle of Adwa) in their early twenties in Sweden. They were the first Swedish based underground hip hop band to reach gold and platinum sales outside Scandinavia. Also called gay hip hop pioneers (Cream is a lesbian), in 1996, Addis Black Widow was the first rap act to take a controversial lesbian themed music videos such as ("Innocent") to MTVs top 5 most played video list. "Innocent" peaked at #42 in the UK Singles Chart in February 1996.

In 2001, they released the second album (ABW) with hit singles "Goes Around Comes Around" and "Wait in Summer". Because of musical differences and clash of artistic interest, Cream left the band in 2005.

Da Cream is also featured on the Whale album All Disco Dance Must End in Broken Bones, on 2 tracks, 4 Big Speakers and Crying At Airports, as Bus75 in 1998

== Albums ==
- The Battle of Adwa (1995)
- ABW (2001)
