= The Knife discography =

Band discography

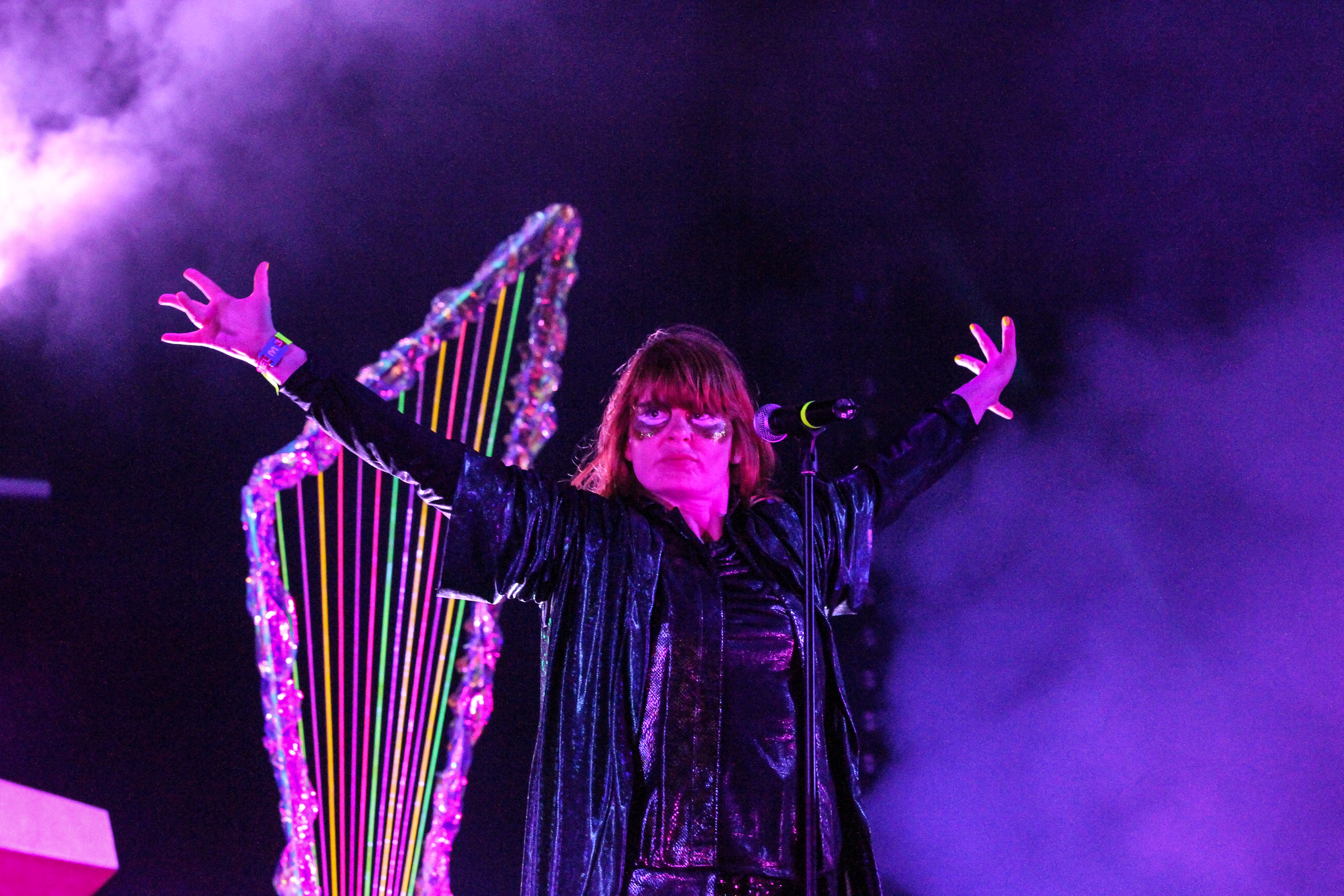
- One of the backing singers of the Knife performing at Melt! Festival 2013
- Studio albums: 5
- Extended plays: 3
- Soundtrack albums: 1
- Live albums: 1
- Singles: 20
- Video albums: 2
- Music videos: 18
- Mini-albums: 1
- Promotional singles: 1
- Short films: 2

The discography of Swedish electronic music duo the Knife consists of five studio albums, one mini-album, one live album, one soundtrack album, two video albums, two extended plays, 19 singles, one promotional single, 18 music videos, and two short films.

== Albums ==
=== Studio albums ===
List of studio albums, with selected chart positions and certifications
Title	Details	Peak chart positions										Certifications
Title	Details	SWE	AUS	BEL (FL)	DEN	GER	IRE	NL	NOR	UK	US	Certifications
The Knife	Released: 5 February 2001; Label: Rabid; Formats: CD, LP, digital download	—	—	—	—	—	—	—	—	—	—	
Deep Cuts	Released: 17 January 2003; Label: Rabid; Formats: CD, LP, digital download	11	—	—	—	—	—	—	—	— (Note: Deep Cuts did not enter the UK Albums Chart but peaked at number 58 on the UK Physical Albums Chart.)	—	GLF: Gold
Silent Shout	Released: 17 February 2006; Label: Rabid; Formats: CD, LP, digital download	1	— (Note: Silent Shout did not enter the ARIA Top 100 Albums Chart but peaked at number 10 on the ARIA Album Hitseekers Chart.)	47	—	—	—	—	25	— (Note: Silent Shout did not enter the UK Albums Chart but peaked at number 38 on the UK Albums Sales Chart.)	—	
Tomorrow, in a Year (with Mt. Sims and Planningtorock)	Released: 1 February 2010; Label: Rabid; Formats: CD, digital download	24	—	79	—	—	—	—	—	—	—	
Shaking the Habitual	Released: 5 April 2013; Label: Rabid; Formats: CD, LP, digital download	8	50	16	13	67	30	67	22	31	52	
"—" denotes a recording that did not chart or was not released in that territory.

=== Remix albums ===
Title	Details
Shaken-Up Versions	Released: 13 June 2014; Label: Rabid; Format: Digital download

=== Soundtrack albums ===
List of soundtrack albums, with selected chart positions
Title	Details	Peaks
Title	Details	SWE
Hannah med H Soundtrack	Released: 23 November 2003; Label: Rabid; Formats: CD, digital download	51

=== Live albums ===
Title	Details
Live at Terminal 5	Released: 1 September 2017; Label: Rabid; Format: CD+DVD, LP+CD+DVD

== Extended plays ==
Title	Details
Gender Bender	Released: 13 December 2004; Label: Rabid; Format: 10-inch vinyl
Stay Out Here / Ready to Lose (Remixes)	Released: 23 September 2014 (digital download); 10 July 2015 (12-inch vinyl); Label: Rabid; Formats: 12-inch vinyl, digital download
Country Creatures (with Björk and Fever Ray)	Released: 1 November 2019; Label: One Little Indian; Format: 12-inch vinyl

== Singles ==
List of singles, with selected chart positions, showing year released and album name
Title	Year	Peak chart positions							Album
Title	Year	SWE	AUS Dance	SCO	UK	UK Dance	UK Indie	US DSS	Album
"Afraid of You"	2000	—	—	—	— (Note: "Afraid of You" did not enter the UK Singles Chart but peaked at number 58 on the UK Physical Singles Chart.)	—	—	—	Non-album single
"N.Y. Hotel"	2001	—	—	—	—	—	—	—	The Knife
"Got 2 Let U"	2002	—	—	—	—	—	—	—	Deep Cuts
"Nedsvärtning"	2002	—	—	—	—	—	—	—	Non-album single
"Heartbeats"	2002	26	—	—	119	—	45	—	Deep Cuts
"You Take My Breath Away"	2003	—	—	—	90	—	23	—	Deep Cuts
"Pass This On"	2003	—	37	—	134	10	19	—	Deep Cuts
"Handy-Man"	2003	—	—	—	—	—	—	—	Hannah med H Soundtrack
"Silent Shout"	2006	—	—	—	208	8	25	12	Silent Shout
"Marble House"	2006	—	—	—	— (Note: "Marble House" did not enter the UK Singles Chart but peaked at number 73 on the UK Physical Singles Chart.)	—	14	9	Silent Shout
"We Share Our Mothers' Health"	2006	—	—	48	85	4	7	18	Silent Shout
"Like a Pen"	2006	—	—	57	96	—	5	15	Silent Shout
"Seeds" (with Mt. Sims and Planningtorock)	2010	—	—	—	—	—	—	—	Tomorrow, In a Year
"Full of Fire"	2013	—	—	—	—	—	—	—	Shaking the Habitual
"A Tooth for an Eye"	2013	—	—	—	— (Note: "A Tooth for an Eye" did not enter the UK Singles Chart but peaked at number 45 on the UK Physical Singles Chart.)	—	—	—	Shaking the Habitual
"Raging Lung"	2013	—	—	—	—	—	—	—	Shaking the Habitual
"Let's Talk About Gender Baby, Let's Talk About You and Me" (Planningtorock Rework)	2013	—	—	—	—	—	—	—	Non-album single
"Without You My Life Would Be Boring"	2014	—	—	—	—	—	—	—	Shaking the Habitual
"För alla namn vi inte får använda" (with Europa Europa)	2014	—	—	—	—	—	—	—	Non-album single
"Features Creatures" (The Knife Remix) (with Björk)	2019	—	—	—	—	—	—	—	Country Creatures
"—" denotes a recording that did not chart or was not released in that territory.

=== Promotional singles ===
Title	Year	Album
"Christmas Reindeer"	2006	Non-album single

== Remixes ==
Title	Year	Artist
"Let My Shoes Lead Me Forward"	2005	Jenny Wilson
"Keep You Kimi"	2005	Hird
"Parliament Square"	2005	Stina Nordenstam
"Čiŋat"	2008	Mari Boine

== Videography ==
=== Video albums ===
Title	Details
When I Found the Knife	Released: 4 July 2005; Label: Rabid; Format: DVD+CD
Silent Shout: An Audio Visual Experience	Released: 8 November 2006; Label: Rabid; Formats: DVD, digital download
The Knife - Live At Terminal 5	Released: 1 September 2017; Label: Rabid; Formats: YouTube

=== Music videos ===
List of music videos, showing year released and directors
Title	Year	Director(s)
"N.Y. Hotel"	2001	Andreas Korsár and Andreas Nilsson
"Pass This On"	2003	Johan Renck
"Heartbeats"	2003	Andreas Nilsson, Johannes Nyholm and Bo Melin
"Handy-Man"	2003	Bold Faces
"You Take My Breath Away" (version one)	2003	Henry Moore Selder
"You Take My Breath Away" (version two)	2004	Peter Gerschwind
"Rock Classics"	2005	Amy Leech
"Silent Shout"	2006	Andreas Nilsson
"Marble House" (version one)	2006	Björn Renner
"Marble House" (version two)	2006	Chris Hopewell
"We Share Our Mothers' Health"	2006	Motomichi Nakamura
"Like a Pen"	2006	Andreas Nilsson
"Na Na Na" (unreleased)	2007	David Vegezzi and Dagmar Weaver-Madsen
"Full of Fire"	2013	Marit Östberg
"A Tooth for an Eye"	2013	Roxy Farhat and Kakan Hermansson
"Raging Lung"	2013	Sorkklubben
"Let's Talk About Gender Baby, Let's Talk About You and Me" (Planningtorock Rework)	2013	Planningtorock
"Without You My Life Would Be Boring" (Shaken-Up Version)	2014	Bitte Andersson

=== Short films ===
Title	Year	Notes
When I Found the Knife	2004	Story by Frau Rabid, animated by Vardag
When I Found the Knife Again	2006	Directed by Amy Engles
