= Silent Shout Tour =

2006 concert tour by the Knife

- Tour by The Knife
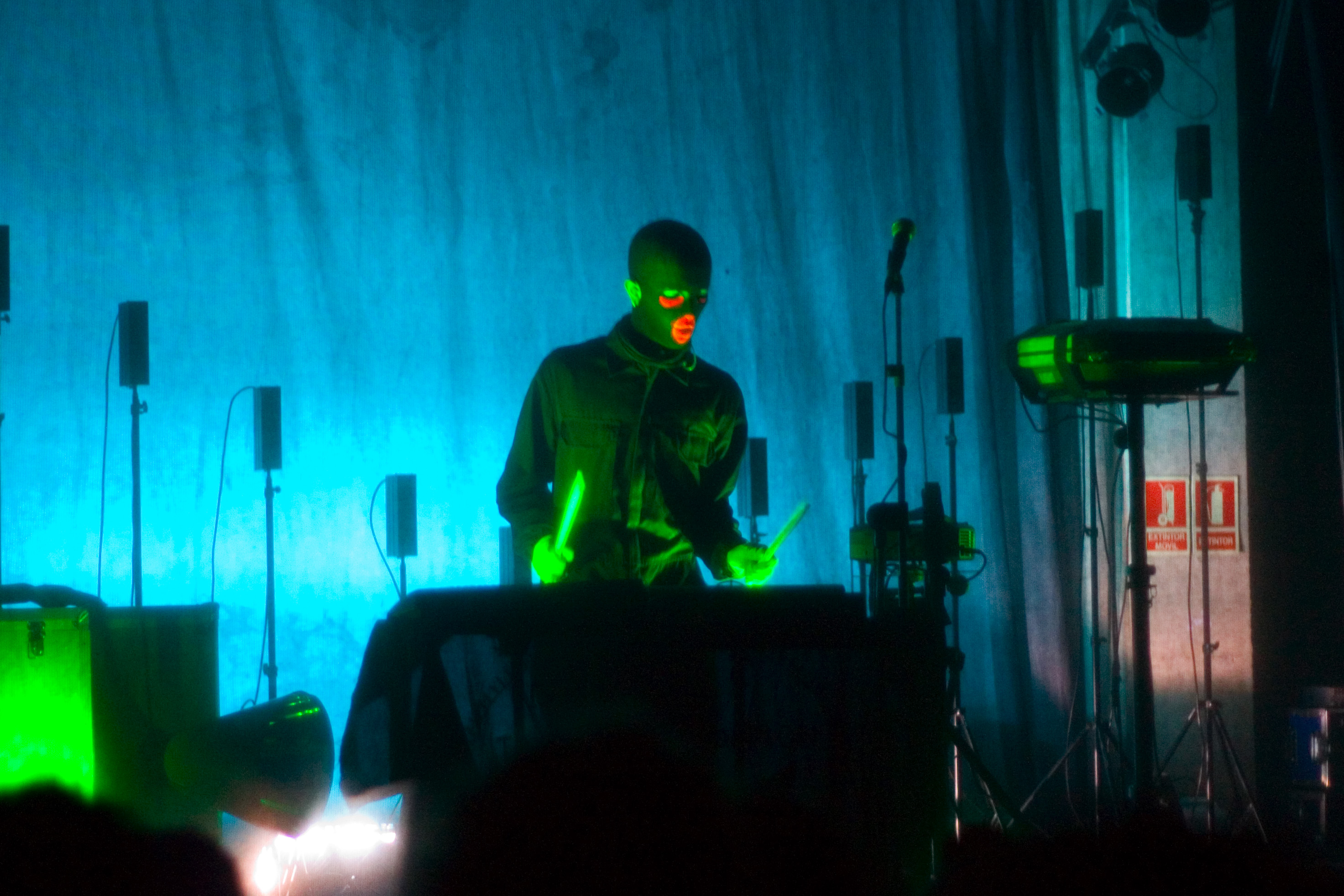
- Olof Dreijer of the Knife performing at Sónar 2006 in Barcelona, Spain
- Associated album: Silent Shout
- Start date: March 30, 2006
- End date: November 4, 2006
- No. of shows: 21'

The Knife concert chronology
- Silent Shout Tour (2006); Shaking the Habitual Tour (2013/2014)

The Silent Shout Tour was the debut concert tour by Swedish electronic music duo the Knife in support of their album Silent Shout.

The concert in Trädgår'n, Gothenburg, Sweden was recorded in 5.1 surround sound and released on DVD as Silent Shout: An Audio Visual Experience.

== Setlist ==
1. "Pass This On"
2. "The Captain"
3. "We Share Our Mothers' Health"
4. "You Make Me Like Charity"
5. "Marble House"
6. "Forest Families"
7. "Kino"
8. "Heartbeats"
9. "Silent Shout"
10. "From Off to On"

encore:

1. "Like a Pen"

== Reception ==
Jon Pareles of The New York Times described the concert at Webster Hall as "an elaborately synthetic production that flaunted technology but conjured emotion". Resident Advisor rated the concert at Scala, London 4 out of 5 and in a subsequent feature called it "one of the most memorably bizarre performances the electronic music scene has ever witnessed".

== Tour dates ==
| Date | City | Country | Venue |
|---|---|---|---|
| March 30, 2006 | Stockholm | Sweden | Berns |
| March 31, 2006 | Lund | Sweden | Merjeriet |
| April 6, 2006 | Berlin | Germany | Maria am Ostbahnhof |
| April 10, 2006 | London | United Kingdom | Scala |
| April 12, 2006 | Gothenburg | Sweden | Trädgår'n |
| June 6, 2006 | Paris | France | La Machine du Moulin Rouge |
| June 15, 2006 | Barcelona | Spain | Sónar Festival |
| July 13, 2006 | Arvika | Sweden | Arvikafestivalen |
| August 10, 2006 | Oslo | Norway | Øyafestivalen |
| August 11, 2006 | Saalburg | Germany | SonneMondSterne |
| August 17, 2006 | Hasselt | Belgium | Pukkelpop |
| August 18, 2006 | Biddinghuizen | Netherlands | Lowlands Festival |
| October 10, 2006 | Milan | Italy | Magazzini Generali |
| October 12, 2006 | Paris | France | La Cigale |
| October 13, 2006 | Cologne | Germany | Gebäude 9 |
| October 14, 2006 | London | United Kingdom | The Forum |
| October 15, 2006 | Amsterdam | Netherlands | Paradiso |
| October 16, 2006 | Copenhagen | Denmark | Vega |
| October 17, 2006 | Copenhagen | Denmark | Vega |
| November 1, 2006 | New York City | United States | Webster Hall |
| November 3, 2006 | San Francisco | United States | Mezzanine |
| November 4, 2006 | Los Angeles | United States | El Rey Theatre |
