= Shaking the Habitual Tour =

2013–14 concert tour by the Knife

- Tour by The Knife
- Promotional tour poster
- Associated album: Shaking the Habitual
- Start date: April 26, 2013
- End date: November 8, 2014
- No. of shows: 50

The Knife concert chronology
- Silent Shout Tour (2006); Shaking The Habitual Tour (2013/2014)

The Shaking the Habitual Tour is a concert tour by Swedish electronic music duo The Knife in support of their album Shaking the Habitual. It is their first live appearance in seven years since the Silent Shout Tour in 2006, as well as their final tour.

== Background ==
When asked about the live shows in interviews The Knife had repeatedly been unforthcoming. Filter asked 'Can you tell us what the live show will be like?' and Karin responded 'That is a huge secret'. It was, however, revealed in an interview with The Guardian that the live shows have 'been devised in collaboration with an all-female collective of choreographers and set designers'. Karin also told Spin "it has to be fun, and we should enjoy the process. I think we will show some humor in our live show".

On 22 April 2013, The Knife posted details about the show on their website revealing that a handful of the European shows would begin with 'DEEP Aerobics' (short for "Death Electro Emo Protest Aerobics") and the shows in Stockholm with Cool Pans, "the biggest steel band in Scandinavia" and "Danceoke", organized by artist collective and feminist support group Öfa-Kollektivet.

The post also identified the members of Shaking The Habitual Show Team (aka Sorkklubben):

Adena Asovic, Anna Efraimsson, Andrea Svensson, Bella Rune, Erika Niklasson, Halla Olafsdottir, Iwa Herdensjö, Jonas Nobel, Karin Dreijer, Kim Einarsson, Jesper Ekholm Strömbäck, Laura Davis, Lotje Horvers, Lucie Barinkova, Marcus Baldemar, Maryam Nikandish, Nicole Lattimore, Olof Dreijer, Rami Jawhari Jansson, Sharon ‘Bamo’ Bampton, Stina Nyberg, SUTODA, Thomas Romlöv and Zoë Poluch.

== Set list ==
Some songs are played live while others are live recordings or album tracks which the group dance to.

2013 Setlist

Title	Type
A Cherry on Top	Live
Raging Lung	Live
Bird	Live Recording Playback
Without You My Life Would Be Boring	Live Recording Playback
A Tooth for an Eye	Studio Album Playback
One Hit	Studio Album Playback
Networking	Studio Album Playback
Wrap Your Arms Around Me	Live
Ready to Lose	Live
Got 2 Let U	Live Recording Playback
Full of Fire	Studio Album Playback
Stay Out Here	Studio Album Playback
Silent Shout	Live

2014 Setlist

Title	Type
Wrap Your Arms Around Me	Live
Raging Lung	Live
We Share Our Mother's Health	Live
Bird	Live Recording Playback
Without You My Life Would Be Boring	Live Recording Playback
A Tooth for an Eye	Live?
One Hit	Studio Album Playback
Full of Fire	Live
Collective Body Possum (Poem)	Spoken Word
Ready to Lose	Live
Pass This On (performed with Shannon Funchess)	Live
Stay Out Here (performed with Shannon Funchess)	Live
Silent Shout	Live

== Critical reception ==
The live show has received positive to mixed reviews from critics and fans. The Independent praised and defended the show, giving it 5 out of 5 stars noting that "some people just can’t stand to have their boundaries gently nuzzled, let alone pushed" and "The Knife have caused uproar merely by... taking themselves out of centre stage". The Quietus called the show "a triumph of displacement and mistaken identity" emphasising "performance's endless capacity for disruption". The Guardian said "far from a joyless exercise in conceptualism, this is an absurdist sci-fi rave, complete with retro-futurist instruments, strobe lights and glow-sticks".

The Evening Standard gave the show 2 stars out of 5 saying "The Knife's comeback defied expectations, and was frequently fun, but mostly it felt like the joke was on us". MTV said "'challenging', unconventional' and even 'uncomfortable' are all things we have come to not only expect but demand from The Knife, but tonight's performance ultimately just failed to cut it". Some fans left negative reviews on Last.fm calling it "an amateurish dance show".

In an interview with The Quietus, Olof Dreijer responded to the criticism, saying "We are on stage like this – if people don't like that, it's fine" and "it's important to say that many of the things we do on stage have previously been done within the comfort zone of the queer community. We have years of drag, voguing and miming behind us – but they have been done within a group that wants that and reconfirms it. Whereas now The Knife have ended up in a bit more of a mainstream situation where there are people outside this comfort zone, who might not be socialist or feminist or queer. It's not so strange for us.

== Tour dates ==
Date	City	Country	Venue	Opener	DJ Set
April 26, 2013	Bremen	Germany	Pier 2	Deep Aerobics	
April 27, 2013	Hamburg	Germany	Docks	Deep Aerobics	
April 29, 2013	Milan	Italy	Alcatraz	Deep Aerobics	
April 30, 2013	Zürich	Switzerland	Komplex 457	Deep Aerobics	
May 1, 2013	Munich	Germany	Muffathalle	Deep Aerobics	
May 2, 2013	Cologne	Germany	E-Werk		
May 4, 2013	Paris	France	Cité de la Musique		Planningtorock
May 5, 2013	Brussels	Belgium	Ancienne Belgique		
May 6, 2013	Amsterdam	Netherlands	Paradiso		Shinedoe
May 8, 2013	London	United Kingdom	Roundhouse	Deep Aerobics	Hannah Holland
May 9, 2013	London	United Kingdom	Roundhouse	Deep Aerobics	Hannah Holland
May 11, 2013	Berlin	Germany	Columbiahalle		rRoxymore
May 12, 2013	Copenhagen	Denmark	Vega	Deep Aerobics	Pernille Krog Mogensen
May 13, 2013	Copenhagen	Denmark	Vega	Deep Aerobics	Pernille Krog Mogensen
May 15, 2013	Oslo	Norway	Sentrum Scene	Deep Aerobics	
May 16, 2013	Stockholm	Sweden	Hangaren Subtopia	Cool Pans & Danceoke	Lemieux
May 17, 2013	Stockholm	Sweden	Hangaren Subtopia	Cool Pans & Danceoke	Lemieux & Jin Mustafa
May 24, 2013	Barcelona	Spain	Primavera Sound		
June 14, 2013	Aarhus	Denmark	Northside Festival		
July 19, 2013	Gräfenhainichen	Germany	Melt! Festival	Deep Aerobics	
August 7, 2013	Helsinki	Finland	Flow Festival		
August 9, 2013	Gothenburg	Sweden	Way Out West	Deep Aerobics	
August 10, 2013	Oslo	Norway	Øyafestivalen		
August 15, 2013	Paredes de Coura	Portugal	Paredes de Coura Festival		
August 17, 2013	Kiewit	Belgium	Pukkelpop	Deep Aerobics in support of Pussy Riot	
August 18, 2013	Biddinghuizen	Netherlands	Lowlands		
August 30, 2013	Zürich	Switzerland	Zürich Openair		
September 1, 2013	Stradbally	Ireland	Electric Picnic	Deep Aerobics	
September 6, 2013	Warsaw	Poland	Selector Festival	Deep Aerobics	
September 7, 2013	Whiteley	United Kingdom	Bestival		
October 31, 2013	Paris	France	Pitchfork Music Festival		
April 9, 2014	Pomona	United States	Pomona Fox Theater	Deep Aerobics	
April 11, 2014	Indio	United States	Coachella Valley Music and Arts Festival		
April 15, 2014	Oakland	United States	Fox Oakland Theatre	Deep Aerobics	
April 16, 2014	Oakland	United States	Fox Oakland Theatre	Deep Aerobics	
April 18, 2014	Indio	United States	Coachella Valley Music and Arts Festival		
April 21, 2014	Denver	United States	Fillmore Auditorium	Deep Aerobics	
April 23, 2014	Chicago	United States	Aragon Ballroom	Deep Aerobics	
April 25, 2014	Toronto	Canada	Kool Haus	Deep Aerobics	
April 26, 2014	Montreal	Canada	Métropolis	Deep Aerobics	
April 28, 2014	Boston	United States	House of Blues	Deep Aerobics	
April 30, 2014	New York City	United States	Terminal 5	Deep Aerobics	
May 1, 2014	New York City	United States	Terminal 5	Deep Aerobics	
October 30, 2014	Stockholm	Sweden	Annexet	Deep Aerobics	
October 31, 2014	Stockholm	Sweden	Annexet	Deep Aerobics	
November 1, 2014	Gothenburg	Sweden	Film Studios	Deep Aerobics	
November 3, 2014	Berlin	Germany	Arena	Deep Aerobics	
November 5, 2014	Manchester	United Kingdom	Manchester Academy	Deep Aerobics	
November 6, 2014	London	United Kingdom	Brixton Academy	Deep Aerobics	DJ Maryam
November 8, 2014	Reykjavík	Iceland	Iceland Airwaves	Deep Aerobics	
