= All Love's Legal =

Studio album by Planningtorock
- Released: 14 February 2014
- Genres: Electronic pop; house; disco
- Length: 42:25
- Label: Human Level
- Producer: Planningtorock

Planningtorock chronology
W (2011)	All Love's Legal (2014)	Powerhouse (2018)

Singles from All Love's Legal
- 1. "Patriarchy Over and Out" Released: 3 July 2012; 2. "Misogyny Drop Dead" Released: 30 January 2013; 3. "Let's Talk About Gender Baby, Let's Talk About You and Me" Released: 18 September 2013; 4. "Welcome" Released: 29 October 2013; 5. "Human Drama" Released: 14 November 2013

All Love's Legal is the third studio album by English musician Jam Rostron, known by their stage name Planningtorock; the album is their first since they came out as genderqueer, and it was released on 14 February 2014 by Human Level, a label Rostron formed to promote queer and female music producers. Featuring themes of feminism, gender, and queerness, All Love's Legal differs from Planningtorock's previous record W (2011) due to its less subtle lyrics and pop-orientated disco style. The album was promoted with several pre-album track releases, remixes by Rostron themself and other musicians such as TR/ST, Holly Herndon, and fellow Human Level artist rRoxymore, and music videos Rostron self-directed with an all-female team. Reviewers strongly praised the musical style and sound, but had mixed opinions on its use of sloganeering in delivering socially-charged statements.

== Lyrics and themes ==
As the tour for Jam Rostron's album W (2011) neared its end in the summer of 2012, they noticed that there were "certain things that I didn't achieve" with it, as well as themes about social issues and their personal life that oddly were not incorporated into the lyrics they wrote. They intended their next album to consist of tracks that were about touchy subject matter but were still accessible in some way; they originally thought of writing a depth-filled set of songs about social issues without discomforting listeners, but that plan "didn't translate" and they "came to the conclusion that if it's a problem for people to talk about these issues, then that's the issue". Thus, they moved from the "subtle and poetic" showcase of political themes on W into more "direct" statements when writing the lyrics for their next album.

An album by an artist most notable for their connections with Swedish group The Knife, All Love's Legal was compared by reviewers to Shaking the Habitual for its political themes about gender, feminism, and queer theory and the pink shading on its album cover; in fact, the Salt-n-Pepa-referencing outro line from Shaking the Habitual's "Full of Fire", "Let's talk about gender baby, let's talk about you and me" is repeated throughout All Love Legal's "Let's Talk About Gender Baby".

== Music ==
All Love's Legal's arrangements are minimal, uses dubstep atmospherics, and sonically focuses on the space of the sound. While maintaining the other-worldly orchestral house style and adrogynous vocals of W, All Love's Legal moves towards a more pop-oriented retro disco album, a transition Planningtorock made that was inspired by the queer and sexual themes of early house music. Jessica Suarez of Pitchfork analysed the gender neutrality theme to be reflected in the sound, where "the instrumentation is neither pretty nor ugly, human or not human, masculine nor feminine;" this "impersonality" forces the listener to confront "what abandoning deeply-entrenched ways of thinking about gender and desire would actually feel like—it doesn't sound too comfortable, and it shouldn't". Rostron was, according to the album's press release, "queering sonics", meaning that they tried to use as little "normative sonics" as possible, including a "natural voice" and proper note timing,

== Release and promotion ==
All Love's Legal was the first Planningtorock album to be released after Rostron came out as genderqueer, and changed their name to Jam Rostron. For promoting and releasing All Love's Legal, Rostron formed the label Human Level, which was meant to make queer and female produces more prominent in the music industry. In addition to the album's production personnel and publicity photographers consisting entirely of women, the production team of music videos for songs from the album were all women. As Rostron explained, "I said for this [album], I want to work with women only. Magazines come back saying we don't know any [female photographers]. I'm like, well, can you go back and think about that for a minute?"

"Patriarchy Over and Out" was released online on 3 July 2012 and 30 July 2012 as a 12-inch split single with rRoxymore's "Wheel of Fortune", serving as the first release for Rostron's label Human Level. Journalists positively reviewed the track upon its release, a Pretty Much Amazing writer concluding that "the song's last 90 seconds are particularly stirring with [Rostron] injecting some genuine pain and emotion into [their] mantra". Pitchfork writer Laura Snapes called it "a deeply persuasive, beautiful single" and Michael Cragg of The Guardian "a brilliantly odd five and a half minutes". "Misogyny Drop Dead" was released for streaming on 30 January 2013, with a remix by Canadian producer Pursuit Grooves premiering on Fact magazine's website on 26 February 2013. Dummy, upon the song's release, called it "the best thing that 2013 has had to offer so far". The track was on Spin's July 2013 list of the best dance tracks of the year so far and ranked number 45 on a year-end list of best tracks by Resident Advisor. Rostron later produced a less funky, smoother version of the song for a release party of rRoxymore's extended play Precarious / Precious (2013); named the "wanted a different version of MDD for rRoxymore's party remix", it was released publicly on 27 August 2013. Rostron's self-directed video for the song was released on 16 February 2013. Holly Herndon also produced a remix that was released on 13 May 2013.

An extended play that includes and is named after the track was issued on International Women's Day on 8 March 2013 via Human Level; not only was the original mix and Pursuit Grooves' remix of the song present in the track listing, but it also included an instrumental interlude, "Agender", and a track that also later was on All Love's Legal, "Public Love". Reviews of the extended play were positive, with Resident Advisor claiming that "you will struggle to find a more compelling and unusual dance release to have emerged so far this year" and Pitchfork suggesting Planningtorock's direction towards more obviously political material was "viable" and "compelling". On 18 September 2013, Planningtorock released a remix of The Knife's "Full of Fire", titled "Let's Talk About Gender Baby, Let's Talk About You and Me", which is All Love's Legal's "Let's Talk About Gender Baby" but with Karin Dreijer's original vocals instead of Rostron repeating the line. On 20 October 2014, Human Level released the maxi single Gender Baby, which includes the original track, two remixes by LAFAWNDAH & ADR and Rostron themself, and a new original Planningtorock song "U+U"; it was distributed in flower USBs sold on the label's official website and at live shows.

On 29 October 2013, a second Planningtorock album named All Love's Legal was announced to be released by Human Level in February 2014, and the song "Welcome" as well as Rostron's self-directed video for the track was made public online. "Human Drama" was released on 14 November 2013, with a remix by Berlin DJ Perera Elsewhere exclusively released on The Guardian's website on 29 November 2013 and another re-cut by British producer Paula Temple issued on 6 December 2013. The music video, which Rostron also directed and premiered on Dazed's website on 6 December 2013, depicts them and rRoxymore with bowl cuts as "flaming Rorschach-like effects" and changing colours are used on the footage, according to the magazine's summary, to symbolise gender fluidity. On 5 February 2014, The Fader released a mix Planningtorock contributed to the magazine that, in addition to including previously released remixes of tracks from the album, also featured the premiere of "Beyond Binary Binds" and South London producer Mokadem's remix of the title track. A title track remixes EP was issued by Human Level on 21 February 2014 and includes re workings by TR/ST and Berlin group Kool Thing alongside Mokadem's re-cut. All Love's Legal was first released for streaming on The Guardian's website on 11 February 2014.

== Critical reception ==
Professional ratings
Aggregate scores
Source	Rating
AnyDecentMusic?	6.4/10
Metacritic	69/100
Review scores
Source	Rating
AllMusic	3/5 stars
Clash	8/10
Exclaim!	8/10
The Guardian	3/5 stars
The Irish Times	3/5 stars
NME	3/5 stars
The Observer	3/5 stars
Pitchfork	7.5/10
PopMatters	5/10
Resident Advisor	4/5

All Love's Legal's critical response was "generally favorable" according to Metacritic. Some reviewers, such as Suarez and The Quietus's Chad Parkhill, found it necessary in an era of erosion of LGBTQ rights worldwide. Loud and Quiet elucidated, "Rostron knows that the best way to get your message across is to embrace the language of capitalism i.e. an instantaneous, hook heavy soundtrack crammed with messages that stick fast in your head; gender's just a lie and fall in love with whoever you want to are the blazons of [their] campaign". The 405 journalist Robert Whitfield called the record's repetition of slogans "greatly effective, creating memorable lyrics that could easily act as a rallying cry. The intention, like a protest, is not to offer solutions but make the subject unavoidable and open up debate"; additionally, "the intoxicating mix of beats and sloganeering creates something recognisable, yet completely unique in the way it approaches subjects that have largely been ignored—something Planningtorock finds strange given dance music's roots in black and queer styles".

Pretty Much Amazing's Samuel Tolzmann and The Line of Best Fit's Chris Todd suggested it wouldn't win over listeners to whom the album's concepts weren't evident; they wrote that this not helped by the fact that its sound is "cheap" and "jittery" and the artist "fails to make inclusion seem appealing or powerful". The lack of lyrical detail also led reviewers from NME, PopMatters, and AllMusic to call the album inferior to prior Planningtorock LPs that had more depth. Parkhill summarised, "in putting [their] message forward so directly and artlessly, Rostron has robbed [themself] of the chance to perform and embody a form of queer club music, opting instead to merely state it". He furthermore called the lyrics vague to the point of being "half-baked", such as on the title track's declaration that "you cannot legalise love": "If we're talking about acts of love, then states can and do make determinations about what forms of love are legally permissible, and for good reason: some forms of love are expressed in actions that can cause profound harm".

However, several other reviewers from publications like The Guardian, The Irish Times, Exclaim! and Resident Advisor, while lukewarm towards the sloganeering, thought the album was strongly made up for by an interesting and engaging musical style and Rostron's presence. Clash concluded that despite a vocal performance that "veer[s] between engaging and occasionally irritating", All Love's Legal was "a fun record, and as adventurous as we've come to expect from Planningtorock". Whitfield called the album "richly detailed and takes a number of unexpected turns", and Mixmag summarised that "with no twee gimmicks, vibrant colour and bold substance are present in spades, resulting in an album that's nothing short of a masterclass in left-of-centre dance music".

== Track listing ==
All tracks are written by Planningtorock.

No.	Title	Length
1.	"Welcome"	2:00
2.	"All Love's Legal"	3:30
3.	"Human Drama"	4:05
4.	"Answerland"	2:49
5.	"Let's Talk About Gender Baby"	4:21
6.	"Words Are Glass"	1:14
7.	"Misogyny Drop Dead"	4:47
8.	"Beyond Binary Binds"	1:23
9.	"Steps"	4:55
10.	"Public Love"	6:57
11.	"Purple Love"	1:37
12.	"Patriarchy Over & Out"	4:47

== Personnel ==
Credits adapted from the liner notes of All Love's Legal.

- Planningtorock – artwork, mixing, production
- Guy Davie – mastering
- Martin Falck – artwork
- Goodyn Green – artwork photography
- Lexxx – mixing

== Release history ==
Region	Date	Format(s)	Label	Ref.
Germany	14 February 2014	CD; LP; digital download	Human Level	
Japan	17 February 2014	Digital download	Human Level	
United Kingdom	17 February 2014	CD; LP; digital download	Human Level	
United States	18 February 2014	CD; LP; digital download	Human Level	
Japan	2 April 2014	CD	Human Level; Octave Lab	
