= Sk8er =

The word Sk8er (also "sk8ter", "sk8r" and "s8r") is a slang spelling of "skater" and may refer to:

- A Skater
  - Specifically, one who engages in skateboarding
- Sk8er Boi - A song by Avril Lavigne
- Street Sk8er - a skateboarding video game for the PlayStation
