= Street Sk8er 2 =

2000 video game by Atelier Double

- European cover art
- Developer: Atelier Double
- Publishers: WW: Electronic Arts; JP: Micro Cabin
- Platform: PlayStation
- Release: NA: March 14, 2000; EU: March 15, 2000; JP: August 10, 2000
- Genre: Sports
- Modes: Single-player, multiplayer

Street Sk8er 2, known as Street Skater 2 in Europe and Street Boarders 2 (ストリートボーダーズ 2, Sutorīto Bōdāzu Tsū) in Japan, is a 2000 skateboarding video game and the sequel to Street Sk8er. The game was re-released on the PlayStation Network on March 12, 2009 in Europe and on October 12, 2011 in Japan.

== Soundtrack ==
- 8stops7 – "My Would-Be Savior"
- 8stops7 – "Satisfied"
- Citizen King – "Better Days (And the Bottom Drops Out)"
- Citizen King – "Under the Influence"
- Deftones – "My Own Summer (Shove It) (Mid Winter Mix)"
- Del the Funky Homosapien – "Catch All This"
- Ministry – "10/10"
- Shootyz Groove – "Blow Your Top"
- Shootyz Groove – "Mad for It"
- Showoff – "Coalition"
- Static-X – "Push It"
- The Chick Magnets – "Fear of Girls"

== Reception ==
Reception

Aggregate score
Aggregator	Score
GameRankings	71%

Review scores
Publication	Score
AllGame	3.5/5
Consoles +	78%
Electronic Gaming Monthly	4.5/10
EP Daily	7/10
Famitsu	27/40
Game Informer	7/10
GameFan	80%
GameSpot	7/10
IGN	7.5/10
Jeuxvideo.com	16/20
Official U.S. PlayStation Magazine	3/5
The Cincinnati Enquirer	2.5/4

The game received above-average reviews, much better than its predecessor, according to the review aggregation website GameRankings. In Japan, Famitsu gave it a score of 27 out of 40.
