= Shaken-Up Versions =

Remix album by the Knife
- Released: 10 June 2014
- Length: 44:30
- Labels: Brille; Rabid; Mute

The Knife chronology
Shaking the Habitual (2013)	Shaken-Up Versions (2014)

Professional ratings
Aggregate scores
Source	Rating
Metacritic	74/100
Review scores
Source	Rating
AllMusic	4/5 stars
Clash	8/10
Consequence of Sound	D+
Drowned in Sound	7/10
The Irish Times	4/5 stars
NME	8/10
Nothing But Hope And Passion	3/5
Pitchfork	7.3/10
PopMatters	7.3/10
Resident Advisor	4/5

Shaken-Up Versions is an album by the Knife, featuring "classic Knife tracks reworked especially for the band's recent North American leg of their Shaking the Habitual Tour." The album was released in 2014.

== Track listing ==
All tracks are written by The Knife, except where noted.

No.	Title	Length
1.	"We Share Our Mother’s Health (Shaken-Up Version)"	4:22
2.	"Got 2 Let U (Shaken-Up Version)"	4:16
3.	"Bird (Shaken-Up Version)"	5:37
4.	"Without You My Life Would Be Boring (Shaken-Up Version)"	4:44
5.	"Pass This On (Shaken-Up Version)"	5:19
6.	"Ready to Lose (Shaken-Up Version)"	4:16
7.	"Stay Out Here (Shaken-Up Version)"	8:46
8.	"Silent Shout (Shaken-Up Version)"	7:05
