= Silent Shout: An Audio Visual Experience =

- DVD cover
- Directed by: Marius Dybwad Brandrud
- Produced by: Skogen
- Starring: The Knife
- Edited by: Marius Dybwad Brandrud
- Music by: The Knife
- Distributed by: Rabid Records
- Release dates: 8 November 2006 (Sweden); 21 November 2006 (United States)
- Running time: 51 minutes
- Country: Sweden
- Language: English

Silent Shout: An Audio Visual Experience

Live album by The Knife
- Released: 8 November 2006
- Recorded: 12 April 2006
- Venue: Trädgår'n, Gothenburg, Sweden
- Length: 50:12
- Label: Rabid Records
- Director: Marius Dybwad Brandrud
- Producer: The Knife

The Knife chronology
| Silent Shout (2006) | Silent Shout: An Audio Visual Experience (2007) | Tomorrow, in a Year (2010) |

Silent Shout: An Audio Visual Experience is a concert film and live album by Swedish band The Knife, taken from the 12 April 2006 concert at the Trädgår'n, Gothenburg, Sweden, in their 2006 Silent Shout tour. It was released in Sweden in November 2006 on The Knife's Rabid Records label.

The DVD features a 5.1 surround sound recording of the show (with visuals from Andreas Nilsson), as well as all 11 of their music videos. Their short film When I Found The Knife is also included.

The DVD was included in a limited edition box set version of Silent Shout released in July 2007 along with an additional CD of the concert's audio.

== Track listings ==
=== Album / Set list ===
1. "Pass This On" – 5:42
2. "The Captain" – 6:12
3. "We Share Our Mothers' Health" – 4:22
4. "You Make Me Like Charity" – 4:23
5. "Marble House" – 4:58
6. "Forest Families" – 4:17
7. "Kino" – 5:06
8. "Heartbeats" – 4:24
9. "Silent Shout" – 5:19
10. "From Off to On" – 5:35

=== DVD ===
1. Live show
  Music videos
2. "N.Y. Hotel"
3. "Heartbeats"
4. "You Take My Breath Away" (version 1)
5. "Pass This On"
6. "Handy-Man"
7. "You Take My Breath Away" (version 2)
8. "Silent Shout"
9. "Marble House" (original Björn Renner video)
10. "We Share Our Mothers' Health"
11. "Like a Pen"
12. "Marble House" (previously unreleased Chris Hopewell version)
  Short film
13. When I Found The Knife (2004)
