= Silent Shout (song) =

Single by the Knife

from the album Silent Shout
- Released: 20 February 2006
- Genre: Tech house
- Length: 4:53
- Label: Brille
- Songwriter: The Knife
- Producer: The Knife

The Knife singles chronology
"Handy-Man" (2003)	"Silent Shout" (2006)	"Marble House" (2006)

Music video
- "Silent Shout" on YouTube

"Silent Shout" is a song by Swedish electronic music duo the Knife from their third studio album of the same name (2006). The song was released on 20 February 2006 as the album's lead single.

== Critical reception ==
Paul Woloszyn of musicOMH gave a positive review, describing "Silent Shout" as "brooding, bassy, dance-fuelled electronica" that is "pure evil." Likewise, Sharon Edge of Contactmusic.com opined, "the lush and dreamy production is reminiscent of Bristol's finest, while the electronic beats call godfathers of electro Kraftwerk to mind." Edge went on to praise the song as "an intriguing and promising taster" that contains "a moody dance angle to it in the style of VNV Nation."

Blender placed "Silent Shout" at number 92 on its "100 Greatest Songs of 2006". Pitchfork Media placed "Silent Shout" at number 2 on "The Top 100 Tracks of 2006" and at number 74 on its "Top 500 Songs of the 2000s". In addition, Resident Advisor voted "Silent Shout" at number 16 on the "Top 30 Tracks of 2006" and at number 30 on its "Top 100 Tracks of the 2000s". Slant Magazine placed "Silent Shout" at number 84 on its "Best of the Aughts: Singles".

== Music video ==
=== Development ===
For "Silent Shout", director and long-time collaborator Andreas Nilsson drew on the work of Charles Burns' graphic novel Black Hole. Karin Dreijer explained the connection of the video to the song:

We told Andreas we wanted something very dark and surrealist. When he came up with this idea it was perfect. [...] it has all the elements that we like – it's very sad, but hard and beautiful at the same time. And it's cold, but it's warm.

=== Synopsis ===
In the music video, mutated people sing along to the song. Flashing white and orange lights are seen throughout the video. Eventually, a group of mutated people is seen traveling through a forest. A giant man resting on a pillow and blanket nestled against trees continues to sing the song as the group travels by in the background.

=== Reception ===
Gigwise praised the music video as "a brilliant mix of flashing, multi-coloured lights and strange set piece scenes."

== Live performances ==
The Knife performed "Silent Shout" on their live DVD Silent Shout: An Audio Visual Experience.

== Track listings ==
- UK CD single
1. "Silent Shout" (Original Version) – 4:02
2. "Silent Shout" (Williams Acidic Circuits Remix) – 9:47
3. "Silent Shout" (Troy Pierce Barado en Locombia Mix) – 6:22
- UK 12" single

A. "Silent Shout" (Williams Acidic Circuits Remix) – 9:46
AA1. "Silent Shout" (Troy Pierce Barado en Locombia Mix) – 6:30
AA2. "Silent Shout" (Original Version) – 4:02

- US CD maxi single
1. "Silent Shout" (Radio Edit) – 4:02
2. "Silent Shout" (Williams Acidic Circuits Remix) – 9:46
3. "Silent Shout" (Troy Pierce Barado en Locombia Mix) – 6:30
4. "Silent Shout" (Shinedoe Remix) – 7:11
5. "Silent Shout" (Original Version) – 4:53
6. "Silent Shout" (video) – 5:02
- US 12" single

A1. "Silent Shout" (Williams Acidic Circuits Remix) – 9:46
A2. "Silent Shout" (Original Version) – 4:53
B1. "Silent Shout" (Troy Pierce Barado en Locombia Mix) – 6:30
B2. "Silent Shout" (Shinedoe Remix) – 7:11

== Charts ==
Chart (2006)	Peak position
UK Singles (Official Charts Company)	208
UK Dance (Official Charts)	8
UK Indie (Official Charts)	25
US Hot Dance Singles Sales (Billboard)	12
