= Jay-Jay Johanson =

Swedish singer-songwriter

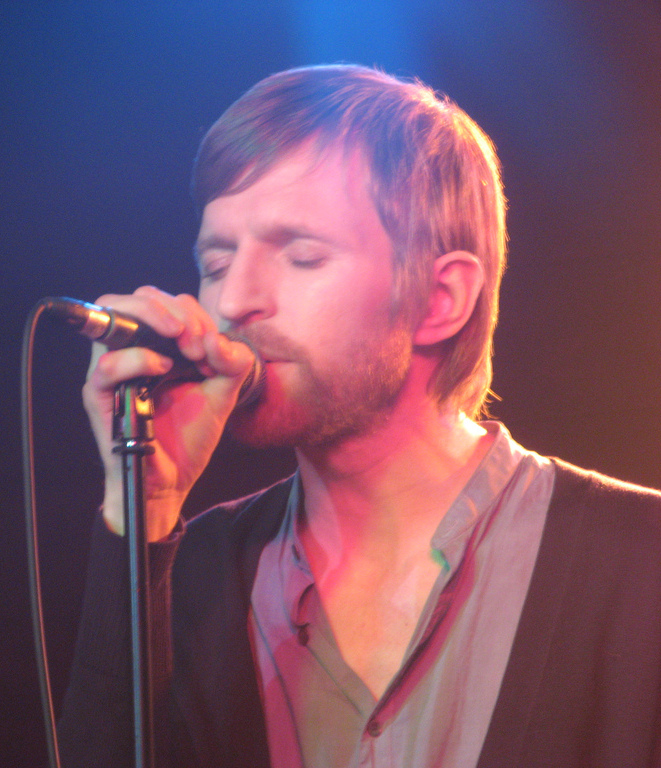
- Johanson performing at Moby Dick Club in Madrid on 22 November 2007

Background information
- Born: Jäje Folke Andreas Johansson; 11 October 1968 (age 57); Trollhättan, Västra Götaland, Sweden
- Genres: Trip hop, synthpop, electroclash
- Occupations: Singer-songwriter, record producer
- Years active: 1996–present
- Labels: RCA, BMG, Art, EMI, Virgin, Universal
- Website: www.jay-jayjohanson.com

Jäje Folke Andreas Johansson (born 11 October 1968), better known by his stage name Jay-Jay Johanson, is a Swedish singer-songwriter, known for his melancholic vocals. His music has integrated the trip hop genre until now, even if he also includes a more electronical oriented direction from his 2002 album Antenna, which featured "On the Radio". From his debuts, he has released 14 studio albums, continually touring on stage all around the world.

== Biography ==
Jay-Jay Johanson was born Jäje Johansson on 11 October 1968 in Trollhättan, Västra Götaland. His debut album, Whiskey, was released in August 1996. Recorded at Break My Heart Studios in the Stockholm archipelago, the album was characterized by its jazzy vocals over trippy, film noir arrangements.

In 1998, Johanson released Tattoo, taking a step into a more richly textured, poetic ambience. Johansson's third album, Poison, was released in April 2000 and went straight into the French charts at number four. The album featured contributions from Cocteau Twins founder and guitarist Robin Guthrie. The same year Johanson also composed the soundtrack to French director Ilan Duran Cohen's film La Confusion des Genres, and in 2001, Johanson emerged with "Cosmodrome", a sound-and-image installation first exhibited in the French city of Dijon. This art-piece has travelled around the world and was last shown at the Musée d'Art Moderne de la Ville de Paris.

Antenna was released in 2002, recorded with assistance from German experimental electronic group Funkstörung. 2004 marked the release of the compilation Prologue, meant for the American market. It was followed by Rush in 2005, an album partly produced by French producer Jean-Pierre Ensuque.

Johanson co-wrote and contributed vocals to The Knife's 2006 song "Marble House". In the spring of 2006, he called together the musicians he had worked with on the three first albums, and January 2007 saw the release of their collaborative effort The Long Term Physical Effects Are Not Yet Known. A tour in promotion of the album kicked off in China and continued to more than thirty cities around the world.

Johanson's eighth studio album Spellbound was released on 2 May 2011. "Dilemma" was released as the album's lead single on 11 March 2011.

After Cockroach (2013), Opium (2015), and Bury The Hatchet (2017), Jay-Jay Johanson released Kings Cross. The name of the album is a reference to the London district where Jay-Jay had been based before starting his musical career. Kings Cross includes "Hear Somebody Whistle" one of his most popular recent songs. This song has been featured in the HBO show Foodie Love, Apple's Vision Pro ad, and also in the movie Eld & lågor (Universal Studios). Jay-Jay shares a duet with Jeanne Added on "Fever".

While he toured all around the world performing in trio or with a full band, Johanson released Rorschach Test in 2021. The song "Vertigo" was chosen by Ralph Lauren at the spring 2022 to be the soundtrack of the AW22 Runway in New York. In July 2022, Balenciaga picked up "The girl with the sun in her eyes", a piano theme featured on the album Bury the Hatchet to be the soundtrack of the AW22 digital campaign. For the first time Johanson, invited by Zemfira, performed at the Royal Albert Hall in November 2022 introducing for the first time the new songs of his upcoming album including "Finally" a ballad including the 3rd Brahms Symphony.

In March 2023, Johanson introduced "Empty Beds" his first art exhibition in Paris at La Hune and in Brussels at the Hôte Gallery.

In June 2023, his 14th album FETISH was released, followed by a worldwide tour for the season 2023-2024.

== Discography ==
=== Studio albums ===
Title	Details	Peak chart positions	
Title	Details	SWE	FRA
Whiskey	Released: 1996; Label: RCA	–	–
Tattoo	Released: 1998; Label: RCA	–	16
Poison	Released: 2000; Label: RCA	–	20
Antenna	Released: 2 September 2002; Label: RCA	37	53
Rush	Released: 19 September 2005; Label: Virgin, EMI Sweden	52	116
The Long Term Physical Effects Are Not Yet Known	Released: 21 January 2007; Label: Virgin, EMI Sweden	36	84
Self-Portrait	Released: 13 October 2008; Label: Art, Virgin, EMI Sweden	–	107
Spellbound	Released: 2 May 2011; Label: Universal	–	117
Cockroach	Released: 23 September 2013; Label: Universal	–	170
Opium	Released: 16 June 2015; Label: Kwaidan Records, Le Plan	–	–
Bury the Hatchet	Released: 15 September 2017; Label: 29 Music	–	150
Kings Cross	Released: 19 April 2019; Label: 29 Music	–	176
Rorschach Test	Released: 19 March 2021; Label: 29 Music	–	176
FETISH	Released: June 2023; Label: 29 Music	–	?
Backstage	Released: June 2025; Label: 29 Music	–	?

=== Compilation albums ===
- Prologue: Best of the Early Years 1996–2002 (2004)
- 3 Original Album Classics (2009)
- Best of 1996 - 2013 (2013)

=== Soundtrack albums ===
- La Confusion des Genres (2000)
- La Troisième Partie du Monde (2008)

=== Singles ===
Title	Year	Album
"It Hurts Me So"	1996	Whiskey
"So Tell the Girls..."	1996	Whiskey
"Mana Mana Mana Mana"	1997	Whiskey
"She's Mine But I'm Not Hers"	1998	Tattoo
"Milan. Madrid. Chicago. Paris"	1998	Tattoo
"Keep It a Secret"	2000	Poison
"Believe in Us"	2000	Poison
"Automatic Lover"	2002	Antenna
"On the Radio" (SWE #57)	2002	Antenna
"So Tell the Girls... 2004"	2004	Prologue
"100 000 Years"	2005	Rush
"Rush"	2005	Rush
"Because of You"	2005	Rush
"She Doesn't Live Here Anymore"	2006	Long Term Physical Effects Are Not Yet Known
"Rocks in Pockets"	2007	Long Term Physical Effects Are Not Yet Known
"Wonder Wonders"	2008	Self-Portrait
"On The Other Side"	2011	Spellbound
"Dilemma"	2011	Spellbound
"Dry Bones EP"	2013	Cockroach
"Mr Fredrikson EP"	2013	Cockroach
"You'll Miss Me When I'm Gone"	2017	Bury The Hatchet
"Vertigo"	2022	Rorschach Test

=== Documentary ===
- Jay Jay Johanson by Michel Viotte (1999) https://vimeo.com/409467025
