= UltraSex =

2002 studio album by Mount Sims

- Cover art for the American release

Studio album by Mount Sims
- Released: September 3, 2002
- Genres: Electronic; electropop
- Length: 55:40 (Europe); 52:38 (U.S.)
- Labels: International DeeJay Gigolo (Europe); Emperor Norton (U.S.)

Mount Sims chronology
| UltraSex (2002) | Wild Light (2005) |

UltraSex is the debut studio album by American electronic music producer Mount Sims. It was released in 2002 by International DeeJay Gigolo Records in Europe, and Emperor Norton Records in the United States.

== Critical reception ==
Professional ratings
Review scores
| Source | Rating |
|---|---|
| Uncut | 8.0/10 |
| Rolling Stone | 3/5 stars |
| Edmonton Journal | 3.5/5 stars |
| Blender | 3/5 stars |
| AllMusic | 4/5 stars |

Christian Hoard, writing for Rolling Stone in 2002, gave the album a rating of three out of five stars: "Without the hooks or sense of humor of other electro revivalists such as Detroit Grand Pubahs or Fischerspooner, the L.A. band is left to its own slinky devices, which in fact works pretty well on 'Escape Hatch,' whose silly let's-slip-away fantasy is actually improved by its cheapness. Elsewhere, the dark, minor-key melodies sound like afterthoughts."

Bradley Torreano of AllMusic rated the album four out of five stars, writing: "The lack of personal lyrics may leave some cold, but the raw sexual honesty of tracks like 'Come and Get It' don't require any introspective touches to remain effective. In his debut album, Mount Sims manages to kick down some boundaries and offer a throbbing, sensual slab of neo-electro that isn't afraid to offer some self-aware laughs."

== Track listing ==
International DeeJay Gigolo Records track listing
| No. | Title | Length |
|---|---|---|
| 1. | "Hate Fuck" | 3:25 |
| 2. | "Good Service" | 3:48 |
| 3. | "Rational Behavior" | 3:41 |
| 4. | "Delicious Nutricious" | 3:58 |
| 5. | "How We Do" | 3:55 |
| 6. | "Blue Day" | 3:59 |
| 7. | "Come And Get It" | 4:11 |
| 8. | "Alone With You" | 3:24 |
| 9. | "Sex Dimention" | 3:46 |
| 10. | "Object Electronique" | 3:11 |
| 11. | "Later On That Night" | 4:25 |
| 12. | "Bass Fiend" | 3:57 |
| 13. | "Esc Hatch" | 3:41 |
| 14. | "Androgeny" | 2:28 |
| 15. | "Digital General" | 3:51 |
| Total length: | | 55:40 |

Emperor Norton Records track listing
| No. | Title | Length |
|---|---|---|
| 1. | "How We Do" | 3:54 |
| 2. | "Together Alone" | 3:24 |
| 3. | "We Electric" | 3:11 |
| 4. | "Unspeakable" | 4:27 |
| 5. | "Escape Hatch" | 3:42 |
| 6. | "If I Can't Have You" | 6:06 |
| 7. | "Rational Behavior" | 3:41 |
| 8. | "Delicious & Nutritious" | 3:57 |
| 9. | "Blue Day" | 3:57 |
| 10. | "Come And Get It" | 4:12 |
| 11. | "Hollywood Bride" | 3:34 |
| 12. | "Black Sunglasses" | 4:51 |
| 13. | "Good Service" | 3:38 |
| Total length: | | 52:38 |

== Personnel ==
- Mount Sims – writing, performances, production, arrangements
- Mickey Petralia – mixing (all tracks except "Delicious & Nutritious")
- Michael Fitzgerald – co-wrote and co-produced "We Electric"
- Erin Giraud – erotic dancer
- Lisa Eaton – erotic dancer
