= Brown Bag LP =

Studio album by Citizen King
- Released: August 8, 1995
- Recorded: 1995
- Studios: Bauer Productions, Milwaukee
- Genre: Alternative
- Language: English
- Label: King Cast Recording Company
- Producers: Dave Cooley, Matt Sims

Citizen King chronology
Brown Bag LP (1995)	Mobile Estates (1999)

Brown Bag LP is the debut album by Citizen King, released by King Cast Recording Company.

== Notes ==
They supported this recording with shows in and around their home city of Milwaukee, Wisconsin. The album has several tracks produced by Speech of Arrested Development fame. The songs are a hybrid of funk, punk, hip hop, R&B, jazz, blues, and soul. Local favorites performed during this era at their energetic live shows at venues such as Milwaukee's The Rave included "Masquerade," "Beautiful Machine," "Amerekan" and "100 P.S.I." Citizen King's later recordings are a significant departure from the raw style presented on Brown Bag LP.

== Track listing ==
1. 100 PSI
2. Passenger
3. Feathered Friends
4. Amerekan
5. Beautiful Machine
6. Good and Gone
7. Intermission
8. Masquerade
9. Low in the Shadow
10. Pitiful Men
11. Who's That?
12. Test Tube Blues

== Performing credits ==
- Matt Sims - lead vocals
- Kristian Riley - guitar
- Dave Cooley - keyboards
- Malcolm Michiles - turntables
- DJ Brooks - drums
- John Dominguez - bass

== Personnel ==
- Distributed by Don't Records
- Performed by Citizen King.
- Produced by Citizen King and Speech
- Mastered by Rick Bauer
- Design by Scott Schwebel.
- Glass Mastered at Nimbus
- Photography by Parisha Pakroo & Geoffrey Averkamp
