= W (Planningtorock album) =

Studio album by Planningtorock
- Released: 23 May 2011
- Recorded: 2007–2010
- Genres: Electronica; experimental; synth-pop
- Length: 50:21
- Labels: DFA; Rostron
- Producers: Christoffer Berg; Al Doyle; Olof Dreijer; Tom Hopkins; Felix Martin; Alex Pieroni; Planningtorock

Planningtorock chronology
Tomorrow, In a Year (2010)	W (2011)	All Love's Legal (2014)

Singles from Planningtorock
- 1. "Doorway" Released: 21 February 2011; 2. "The Breaks" Released: 10 May 2011; 3. "Living It Out" Released: 7 November 2011

W is the second solo studio album by English recording artist Planningtorock, released on 23 May 2011 by Rostron Records and DFA Records.

== Background and recording ==
Although Planningtorock had been working on the album's songs since 2007, eventually writing more than 27 songs, they didn't sign with DFA Records until correspondence began with James Murphy in 2010 after he sent them a fan email that said "Really like the Planningtorock stuff – just saying".

== Reception ==
=== Critical reception ===
Professional ratings
Aggregate scores
Source	Rating
AnyDecentMusic?	7.4/10
Metacritic	73/100
Review scores
Source	Rating
AllMusic	4/5 stars
The Daily Telegraph	4/5 stars
The Guardian	4/5 stars
Mojo	3/5 stars
NME	4/5 stars
The Observer	3/5 stars
Pitchfork	6.7/10
PopMatters	7/10
Q	3/5 stars
Spin	7/10

W received generally positive reviews from music critics upon its release. At Metacritic, which assigns a normalised rating out of 100 to reviews from mainstream critics, the album received an average score of 73, based on 16 reviews, which indicates "generally favorable reviews". Alex Denney of NME described the album as "a masterpiece of art-pop experimentalism that gleefully expands on [Planningtorock's] debut". Heather Phares from AllMusic stated, "W isn’t as rousing as its predecessor, but it may be an even richer album; in its own way, it's just as audacious". Kitty Empire, writing for The Guardian, commented that W "often takes a bit of dedication, but it's a challenging, lavish listen, too". Summarized Consequence of Sound, "It might be tempting for some to initially dismiss Planningtorock as weird for the sake of being weird, but W exposes an artist who is experimenting with musical conventions, with bizarre and often captivating results".

=== Accolades ===
Clash placed W at number 17 on its list of the top 40 albums of 2011. NME placed the album at number 25 on its list of the 50 best albums of 2011. Sentimentalist Magazine placed it at number two on its list of the top ten albums of 2011.

== Singles ==
"Doorway" was released as the album's lead single commercially in Europe on 21 February 2011. Planningtorock directed and edited the music video for the song by themself.

"The Breaks" became the second single for W and was named the "Single of the Week" by Clash. The single included a remix by Telepathe. The song was later offered as the Free MP3 of the Day on 30 June 2011 on Spinner.

"Living It Out" serves as the album's third single and included remixes by Jackson and Billy Lock (the alias of Felix Martin from Hot Chip). Planningtorock directed two separate music videos: one for the original song and another for the remix by Laurel Halo.

== Track listing ==
All songs and lyrics written and composed by Planningtorock, except where noted.

No.	Title	Length
1.	"Doorway"	3:30
2.	"The One"	4:42
3.	"Manifesto"	3:23
4.	"Going Wrong"	4:55
5.	"I'm Yr Man"	4:06
6.	"The Breaks"	4:36
7.	"Living It Out"	4:30
8.	"Milky Blau"	4:03
9.	"Jam"	4:34
10.	"Black Thumber"	5:22
11.	"Janine" (writer: Arthur Russell)	2:06
12.	"#9"	4:34

Bonus tracks
No.	Title	Length
13.	"Doorway (Jamroll version)"	3:56
14.	"Privates"	4:54
15.	"My Valuable Hunting Knife" (writer: Robert Pollard)	4:02
16.	"Summer Save Me"	3:21

== Personnel ==
Credits for W:

- Planningtorock – vocals, producer, instrumentalist, engineer, mixing, artwork
- Christoffer Berg – mixing, additional production
- Sebastian Müller – mixing
- Bureau – artwork
- Simon Davey – mastering
- Al Doyle – additional production
- Olof Dreijer – additional production
- Tom Hopkins – additional production
- Hjorleifur Jonsson – percussion
- Sten Källman – saxophone
- Pat Mahoney – drums
- Felix Martin – additional production
- Alex Pieroni – Additional production on 'Manifesto'
