= Mobile Estates =

Studio album by Citizen King
- Released: March 9, 1999
- Recorded: 1998
- Genre: Alternative rock; funk rock; rap rock
- Length: 42:32
- Label: Warner Bros.
- Producer: Dave Cooley, Matt Sims, Eric Valentine

Citizen King chronology
Brown Bag LP (1995)	Mobile Estates (1999)

Professional ratings
Review scores
Source	Rating
AllMusic	4/5 stars
The Cincinnati Post	B+
Q	3/5 stars
The Times	8/10

Mobile Estates is the second and final album by Citizen King, released in 1999. It was the band's only album for a major label.

== Production ==
The album was produced by Dave Cooley, Matt Sims, and Eric Valentine.

== Critical reception ==
The Washington Post wrote that "even at Citizen King's most engagingly relaxed ('Jalopy Style', 'Long Walk Home'), the band just sounds like the Red Hot Beastie Spin Doctors." Rolling Stone thought that "if a finer vintage—say, Beck circa 1998—is unavailable, Citizen King are just dope and dopey enough to feed your faux funk habit." The San Antonio Express-News called the album "a tuneful, low-fi and quirky major-label debut."

== Track listing ==
All songs written by Matt Sims and Dave Cooley, except where noted.

1. "Under the Influence" (Sims) - 4:22
2. "Better Days (And the Bottom Drops Out)" - 3:38
3. "Safety Pin" (Sims) - 3:45
4. "Jalopy Style" - 3:11
5. "Basement Show" - 3:48
6. "Smokescreen" - 3:24
7. "The Milky Way" - 0:46
8. "Long Walk Home" - 2:58
9. "Skeleton Key" - 4:37
10. "Closed for the Weekend" (Sims) - 2:56
11. "Salt Bag Spill" - 2:15
12. "Billhilly" - 3:27
13. "Checkout Line" - 3:36

== Personnel ==
- Matt Sims - lead vocals, bass guitar
- Kristian Riley - guitar, backing vocals
- Dave Cooley - keyboards
- Malcolm Michiles - turntables
- DJ Brooks - drums, programming, backing vocals
