= Black Hole (comics) =

Comic book limited series by Charles Burns

- Trade paperback cover

Publication information
- Publisher: Kitchen Sink Press/Fantagraphics
- Format: Limited series
- Publication date: 1995–2005
- No. of issues: 12

Creative team
- Written by: Charles Burns
- Artist: Charles Burns

Collected editions
- Paperback: ISBN 978-0-375-71472-6

Black Hole is a twelve-issue comic book limited series written and illustrated by Charles Burns and published first by Kitchen Sink Press, then Fantagraphics. It was released in collected form in 2005 by Pantheon Books. The story deals with the aftermath of a sexually transmitted infection that causes grotesque mutations in teenagers. Burns has said that the mutations can be read as a metaphor for adolescence, sexual awakening and the transition into adulthood.

== Publication history ==
Black Hole was published as a 12-issue comic book limited series between 1995 and 2005. The first four issues were released by Kitchen Sink Press, before the publisher went out of business. Fantagraphics republished the first four issues and then the remaining eight.

A compiled hardcover volume was released by Pantheon Books in 2005 (without the interstitial character portraits from the single issues).

Before Black Hole, Burns published a four-page story called "Contagious" in the comics anthology Taboo (issue #1, Fall 1988). While only four pages long, "Contagious" has similar themes and visuals to Black Hole: the story deals with an adolescent infected with a similar mutation.

== Plot ==
Set in the suburbs of Seattle during the mid-1970s, the story follows a group of teenagers who contract a mysterious sexually transmitted disease referred to as "the Bug", which causes them to develop bizarre unique physical mutations and subsequently become social outcasts, many of them running away from home to live in the nearby woodland.

The plot focuses on two central characters who often narrate the story: Chris, a popular and respected female student, and Keith, a stoner who seems to experience anxiety. The viewpoint changes between (and sometimes within) issues. When the characters are introduced, Keith has a crush on Chris, who is kind to Keith but does not reciprocate his feelings. At a party, Chris quickly becomes infatuated with popular student Rob Fancicani. The two leave the party and have sex, Chris unaware that Rob carries the Bug. Once Chris realizes she has been infected, she and Rob do not speak for some time. Keith and Chris share a moment at another party where Keith bandages Chris' cut foot. While Keith becomes even more infatuated with Chris, she still does not return his feelings. Around the same time, Keith meets Eliza, a young woman who also carries the Bug which manifests as a lizard-like tail. Despite their instant attraction, the two do not have sex.

Meanwhile, many other teens in the town have contracted the disease, and several of them seek seclusion from society due to the severity of their mutations by building an encampment in the woods outside of town. Some of the infected teens, particularly females, begin disappearing, with strange statues and even body parts being found around the woods. Chris and Rob eventually renew their relationship, which culminates with Chris running away from home to the encampment in the woods. Rob introduces Chris to Dave, a mutated teen who was unpopular and bullied while attending school. Rob continues to live with his parents and attends school, visiting Chris daily at the encampment. Meanwhile, Keith and Eliza have sex, and Keith subsequently becomes infected.

Later, an unknown mutated man murders Rob as he leaves Chris' tent one night. Chris does not know of Rob's fate and is devastated by his disappearance. Chris starts going to The Pit, where she encounters Keith, a regular visitor who brings supplies to the teens. After pressuring her for some time, Keith convinces Chris to stay at a tract house that he is watching while its owners are on vacation. Chris eventually invites some of the other teens who frequent The Pit to stay at the tract house, which they proceed to destroy to Keith's detriment. Chris becomes closer to Dave, and the two often spend time together. However, Dave's true sinister nature shows when Chris rejects his advances. With Chris locked inside her room, Dave shoots most of the teens living in the house using a gun that he had stolen from Chris' tent. Chris flees through an open window, and Keith discovers the bodies minutes after Dave leaves.

Dave is seen ordering a bucket of chicken and bringing it to his friend Rick, who murdered Rob at Dave's behest. While Rick eats, Dave shoots him in the head and then himself. Keith calls Eliza and the two flee town with survivors Carla and Doug. After dropping off Carla and Doug, Keith and Eliza check into a motel, where they are fearful of the future, but happy together. Meanwhile, Chris hitchhikes to a beach where she and Rob had spent time together. Realizing that he is gone forever, and promising to remember him, Chris swims out into the ocean, uncertain of her future.

== Collected editions ==
Pantheon Books has released soft (ISBN 978-0375714726) and hardcover (ISBN 037542380X) collected editions of the series. In Brazil, publisher Darkside Books released a hardcover collected edition of the series.

== Reception ==
The collected edition won the 2006 Harvey Award for Best Graphic Album of Previously Published Work. Burns also won the 1998, 1999, 2001, 2002, 2004, 2005 and 2006 Harvey Awards for Best Inker for his work on the series.

Black Hole won the 2006 Ignatz Award for Outstanding Anthology or Collection. It was the 2007 winner of the Angoulême Essentials award.

It was voted the third-best foreign comic book published in Japan for the 2013 Gaiman Award presentation.

== In popular culture ==
The Knife's Silent Shout has a title track of the same name and music video that were inspired by Black Hole.

The 2012 song "The Pit" by Silversun Pickups was inspired by Black Hole.

== Adaptation ==
In 2006 Alexandre Aja was set to direct a feature film adaptation, with Neil Gaiman and Roger Avary attached to adapt the screenplay for Paramount Pictures, MTV Films and Plan B. In February 2008 Variety reported that the film would be directed by David Fincher. In October 2008, MTV reported that Gaiman and Avary had left the production and that their script would not be used by Fincher, though no replacement scriptwriter was announced. In 2010, Fincher also exited the project but in October 2013 he was once more attached to direct.

In 2007 Rupert Sanders released an abbreviated live-action adaptation of Black Hole on his website as part of his pitch for the project.

In 2018, the project was revived when New Regency acquired the rights to the film with Rick Famuyiwa attached to write and direct. In October 2025, New Regency and Plan B re-announced the project as a television series for Netflix with Jane Schoenbrun set to write and direct.
