= Opium (Jay-Jay Johanson album) =

Studio album by Jay-Jay Johanson
- Released: June 16, 2015
- Genre: Trip hop, downtempo
- Length: 43:54
- Label: Kwaidan Records, Le Plan
- Producer: Robin Guthrie, Funkstörung

Jay-Jay Johanson chronology
Cockroach (2013)	Opium (2015)

Professional ratings
Aggregate scores
Source	Rating
Metacritic	70/100
Review scores
Source	Rating
Clash Music	8/10
Q	8/10
Mojo	3/5 stars
Uncut	6/10

Opium is the tenth studio album by Swedish trip hop musician Jay-Jay Johanson. It is his first album to be distributed through Kwaidan Records.

== Track listing ==
No.	Title	Length
1.	"Drowsy/Too Young To Say Goodnight"	5:25
2.	"Moonshine"	3:54
3.	"Be Yourself"	3:38
4.	"I Love Him So"	3:42
5.	"Nde"	4:23
6.	"I Don't Know Much About Loving"	4:13
7.	"Scarecrow"	4:39
8.	"I Can Count On You"	4:34
9.	"Alone Too Long"	4:03
10.	"Harakiri"	2:18
11.	"Celebrate The Wonders"	3:01
Total length:		43:54

== Personnel ==
- Jäje Johansson - vocals, bass guitar, drums, glockenspiel, guitars, organ, percussion, piano, trumpet, Wurlitzer, songwriting
- Magnus Frykberg - bass guitar, string arrangements, keyboards, guitars, engineering, songwriting, mixing
- Erik Jansson - bass guitar, guitars, piano, vocoder, Wurlitzer, songwriting
- Robin Guthrie - string arrangements, songwriting, producing
- Mattias Fornell - mastering
- Sixten Delicata Johnsson - handclapping
- Funkstörung - producing
