= Citizen King =

American rock band (1993–2002)

- Origin: Milwaukee, Wisconsin, U.S.
- Genres: Alternative rock; alternative hip hop; hip hop
- Years active: 1993–2002
- Labels: King Cast; Don't; Warner Bros.

Citizen King was an American band from Milwaukee, Wisconsin, whose style was a mix of hip-hop, soul, and punk. They are best known for their top 40 hit "Better Days (And the Bottom Drops Out)", which peaked at No. 25 on the Billboard Hot 100 chart in 1999.

== History ==
The band formed in 1993 after the breakup of their previous band, Wild Kingdom. Both bands gained considerable local recognition for their live shows. While Citizen King's first LP and EP were only commercial successes around Wisconsin, they were well received by critics. They were discovered by Speech from Arrested Development, who produced several tracks on their debut album, Brown Bag LP. They followed up with the EP Count the Days on Don't Records.

They toured with Fishbone, and executives at Warner Bros. Records signed them after attending their show at the South by Southwest festival. The band's 1999 release Mobile Estates received moderate commercial success. The album's hit song "Better Days (And the Bottom Drops Out)" was played in the pilot episode and the series finale of Malcolm in the Middle.

The band’s first single and biggest hit was "Better Days (And The Bottom Drops Out)." It became a Top 40 hit in the summer of 1999. It was also ranked on other Billboard charts, including peaks of No. 3 on Modern Rock, No. 33 on Hot Dance Music/Maxi-Singles Sales, and No. 1 on Top 40 Recurrents. The band performed as part of Humble & Fred Fest at Fort York in Toronto that year.

A remix of "Better Days (And The Bottom Drops Out)" was used in the 2000 movie Gone in 60 Seconds, and the original version was used in the video game Street Sk8er 2, along with "Under the Influence". "Salt Bag Spill" was featured on The Animal soundtrack in 2001. The non-album track "Gangsters" appeared on the Mystery Men soundtrack in 1999. The band was managed by Milwaukee native Jeff Castelaz, who later founded Dangerbird Records, and continues to manage keyboardist Dave Cooley in his work as a producer and mixer.

Castelaz stated in a 2006 interview with onmilwaukee.com that the band had completed 85% of a third album before they suddenly broke up in the early 2000s. Though neither he nor anyone else associated with Citizen King have ever disclosed the reason for the split, he said “it had to happen, based on the reality of the time”. It was rumored, but never confirmed, that the catalyst for the break-up was unscrupulous personal behavior on the part of Sims.

Cooley continued his career as a producer and has produced records for such artists as Silversun Pickups, Local Natives, Eulogies, Darker My Love and The Polyphonic Spree. Cooley also became a mastering engineer for Stones Throw Records, overseeing most of the albums by J Dilla and the label's founder Peanut Butter Wolf.

== Personnel ==
- Mount Sims – vocals (1993–2002), bass (1997–2002)
- Kristian Riley – guitar (1993–2002)
- Dave Cooley – keyboards (1993–2002)
- Malcolm Michiles – turntables (1993–2002)
- Gintas Janusonis – drums (1993–1994)
- DJ Brooks – drums (1994–2002)
- Sage Schwarm – bass (1993–1995)
- John Dominguez – bass (1995)
- Cory Coleman – bass (1995–1997)

== Discography ==
=== Albums ===
- Brown Bag LP (1995)
- Mobile Estates (March 9, 1999), peaked on Billboard's Heatseekers chart at No. 27

=== Extended plays ===
- Sydney Hih (1997) (collection of demos and B-sides from 1993 to 1996)
- Count The Days (April 2, 1996)

=== Singles ===
List of singles, with selected chart positions and certifications, showing year released and album name
Title	Year	Peak chart positions						Album
Title	Year	US	US Alt.	US Pop	AUS	CAN	GER	Album
"Better Days (And the Bottom Drops Out)"	1999	25	3	11	86	20	95	Mobile Estates
"Under The Influence"	1999	—	—	—	—	—	—	Mobile Estates
"Long Walk Home"	2000	—	—	—	—	—	—	Mobile Estates
"—" denotes a recording that did not chart or was not released in that territory.
