= Powerhouse (Planningtorock album) =

Studio album by Planningtorock
- Released: 9 November 2018
- Length: 42:52
- Label: DFA

Planningtorock chronology
All Love's Legal (2014)	Powerhouse (2018)

Powerhouse is the fourth studio album of English musician Planningtorock. The album was critically well-received and landed at number 27 on The Quietus's list of the best albums of 2018.

== Critical reception ==
Powerhouse was met with "generally favorable" reviews from critics. At Metacritic, which assigns a weighted average rating out of 100 to reviews from mainstream publications, this release received an average score of 74, based on 7 reviews.

Professional ratings
Aggregate scores
Source	Rating
Metacritic	74/100
Review scores
Source	Rating
AllMusic	4/5 stars
DJ Mag	7/10
DMC World	5/5
Exclaim!	7/10
Financial Times	3/5 stars
Loud and Quiet	8/10
The Music	4/5 stars
Q	3/5 stars
Resident Advisor	3.8/5
Uncut	7/10

== Track listing ==
Powerhouse track listing
No.	Title	Length
1.	"Wounds"	2:33
2.	"Transome"	3:28
3.	"Dear Brother"	3:28
4.	"Somethings More Painful Than Others"	6:10
5.	"Much to Touch"	4:42
6.	"Jam of Finland"	3:53
7.	"Non Binary Femme"	5:26
8.	"Piece of My Mind"	4:10
9.	"Beulah Loves Dancing"	4:09
10.	"Powerhouse"	4:55
