= Street Sk8er =

1998 video game

Street Skater
- PAL cover art
- Developer: Atelier Double
- Publishers: JP: Micro Cabin; WW: Electronic Arts
- Platform: PlayStation
- Release: JP: October 22, 1998; NA: February 26, 1999; EU: April 1999
- Genre: Sports
- Modes: Single-player, multiplayer

Street Sk8er, known in PAL territories as Street Skater, is a skateboarding video game for the PlayStation. It was first released in Japan in 1998 under the name Street Boarders, (Note: Street Boarders (ストリートボーダーズ, Sutorīto Bōdāzu)) then was licensed by Electronic Arts for distribution in 1999. It was re-released later in Japan as part of the Simple 1500 series of budget games under the name The Skateboard. It was released on the PlayStation 3 in Europe as a download via the PlayStation Store in May 2008.

== Gameplay ==
Players attempt to clear each track by scoring a minimum number of points within a set time limit. The tracks consist of obstacles to perform tricks on, including rails, benches and half-pipes. By clearing a stage the player earns experience points that can be used to make the skater faster, more agile, able to jump higher, etc.

== Reception ==
Reception

Aggregate score
Aggregator	Score
GameRankings	60%

Review scores
Publication	Score
AllGame	2/5
CNET Gamecenter	4/10
Electronic Gaming Monthly	6.625/10
Famitsu	26/40
Game Informer	4.5/10
GamePro	4/5 (Note: GamePro gave the game three 4/5 scores for graphics, control and overall fun factor, and 4.5/5 for sound.)
GameRevolution	C
GameSpot	4/10
IGN	7/10
Next Generation	2/5
PlayStation Official Magazine – UK	8/10
Official U.S. PlayStation Magazine	2.5/5
Pocket Gamer	(PSP) 1.5/5

The game received mixed reviews according to the review aggregation website GameRankings. Next Generation said that the game was "mildly diverting, but it just isn't polished enough to be a standout title. Skateboarding fans will just have to keep playing 720° until a triple-A skating title hits the market." In Japan, Famitsu gave it a score of 26 out of 40.

== Sequel ==
A sequel called Street Sk8er 2 was released in 2000.
