= Better Days (And the Bottom Drops Out) =

1999 single by Citizen King

Single by Citizen King

from the album Mobile Estates
- B-side: "Basement Show"; "Checkout Line" (remix)
- Released: January 26, 1999
- Genre: Alternative rock
- Length: 3:38
- Label: Warner Bros.
- Songwriters: Dave Cooley; Matt Sims
- Producers: Dave Cooley; Matt Sims; Eric Valentine

Citizen King singles chronology
"Better Days (And the Bottom Drops Out)" (1999)	"Under the Influence" (1999)

Music video
- "Better Days (And the Bottom Drops Out)" on YouTube

"Better Days (And the Bottom Drops Out)" is a song by American music group Citizen King from their second studio album, Mobile Estates (1999), as the second track. It was first released to rock radio on January 26, 1999, and was given a commercial release later the same year, serving as the band's debut single. The song peaked at number 25 on the US Billboard Hot 100 and number 20 on Canada's RPM 100 Hit Tracks chart in August 1999. Citizen King did not release another single that replicated the success of "Better Days", making them a one-hit wonder.

== Meaning ==
Citizen King bassist Mount Sims explained that "Better Days" is about the condition of the band three years before the song became a hit, when he was working at a general store and yearned for a life where music was his only focus.

== Track listings ==
US and German CD single; US cassette single

1. "Better Days (And the Bottom Drops Out)" – 3:38
2. "Basement Show" – 3:22

US maxi-CD single

1. "Better Days (And the Bottom Drops Out)" (album version) – 3:38
2. "Better Days (And the Bottom Drops Out)" (Idiot Savant remix) – 6:52
3. "Better Days (And the Bottom Drops Out)" (McMonkey and Fries remix) – 2:12
4. "Better Days (And the Bottom Drops Out)" (Mario Caldato Jr. remix) – 3:20
5. "Checkout Line" (Cibo Matto remix) – 3:53

Australian CD single

1. "Better Days" (LP version)
2. "Better Days" (Mario Caldato Jr. remix)
3. "Check Out Line" (Cibo Matto remix)
4. "Better Days" (Idiot Savant remix)
5. "Better Days" (McMonkey & Fries remix)

== Charts ==
=== Weekly charts ===
Chart (1999)	Peak position
Australia (ARIA)	86
Canada Top Singles (RPM)	20
Germany (GfK)	95
US Billboard Hot 100	25
US Adult Top 40 (Billboard)	10
US Mainstream Top 40 (Billboard)	11
US Maxi-Singles Sales (Billboard)	33
US Modern Rock Tracks (Billboard)	3
US Top 40 Tracks (Billboard)	16

=== Year-end charts ===
Chart (1999)	Position
US Billboard Hot 100	96
US Adult Top 40 (Billboard)	22
US Mainstream Top 40 (Billboard)	36
US Modern Rock Tracks (Billboard)	16

== Release history ==
Region	Date	Format(s)	Label(s)	Ref.
United States	January 26, 1999	Modern rock; college rock; triple A radio	Warner Bros.	
United States	April 6, 1999	Contemporary hit radio	Warner Bros.	

== In popular culture ==
- The song was included in the soundtrack for 2000 film Gone in 60 Seconds.
- The song was used to close out both the pilot and series finale of the Fox sitcom Malcolm in the Middle.
