= Mount Sims =

American musician

- Also known as: Mt. Sims
- Born: Matthew Sims Milwaukee, Wisconsin, U.S.
- Origin: Berlin, Germany
- Occupations: DJ; performance artist; producer
- Label: International DeeJay Gigolo

Matthew Sims, commonly known by his stage name Mount Sims (or Mt. Sims), is a Berlin-based American DJ, performance artist, and producer. A native of Milwaukee, Wisconsin, Sims began his career in the local music scene. Sims was involved in several groups, the most notable of which was Citizen King, an alternative rock band famous for their 1999 hit "Better Days (And the Bottom Drops Out)", which reached #25 on the US Billboard Hot 100 chart. However, Citizen King disbanded by 2002 for undisclosed reasons. Around the same time, Sims relocated to Los Angeles, where he continued his music career as a solo artist. Starting Mount Sims as an electronic music act, later releases have also shown influences from post-punk, new wave, and dark wave. Sims is almost exclusively responsible for every aspect of his music, providing vocals, instrumentation, and production. He was originally supported by three dancers, one of whom was the dancer/choreographer Ryan Heffington. The last incarnation, Mt. Sims, was a three-piece band that included Rand Twigg on bass and Andre Lange on drums.

His debut album, UltraSex, released through International DeeJay Gigolo Records in Europe and Emperor Norton Records in the US, was released to good reviews. It was influenced by German and British new wave bands, funk, and electronica. It was a concept album that focused on the themes of technology and sexuality. The album contains the tracks "How We Do" and "Rational Behaviour".

Mount Sims' second album, Wild Light (released in 2005 on International DeeJay Gigolo Records), is a much darker album than the previous release. Its themes are death and information. Major musical influences are dark wave and post-punk. David J of Bauhaus played bass on some of Wild Light's songs. Roger Joseph Manning, Jr. was responsible for some of the synth production. It contains the songs "No Yellow Lines," "Lights On," and "Restless," a single featured in Amped 3.

Mount Sims is responsible for Madonna's remixes of her song "Nobody Knows Me", from her 2003 album American Life, in which he was noted to time-compress a speech by Charles Manson in order to construct different electronic drums, which he then placed in the remix.

In addition, Mount Sims' song "Torn Into" was featured in the film Lost in Translation.

Mt. Sims' third album, Happily Ever After (2008/Hungry Eye Records), continues on the influences of the previous release with its themes focusing on obsession, isolation, horror, and madness. It was produced by Thomas Stern of Crime & the City Solution and features guest appearances by Jessie Evans (formerly of Subtonix, Autonervous, and The Vanishing), Toby Dammit (Swans, The Residents, and Iggy Pop), and Bryan Black (Motor). The album artwork was created by Peter Wu with layout by Dez of Crossover.

In 2008, he joined the band The Silures, which was founded by Vitalic and Linda Lamb in 2002. In 2009, he quit the group.

In 2010, he collaborated with The Knife and Planningtorock on the electronic opera Tomorrow, In a Year. It is based on Charles Darwin's On the Origin of Species and was released as a studio album.

It was also in 2010 that he collaborated with Warp Records artist Leila for her album U&I, of which he contributed his voice to her electronic compositions.

== Discography ==
Solo

- UltraSex (International DeeJay Gigolo Records) (2002)
- Wild Light (International DeeJay Gigolo Records) (2005)
- A Grave EP (Hungry Eye Records) (2009)
- Happily Ever After (Hungry Eye Records) (2009)
- Happily Ever After...Again (Hungry Eye Records) (2010)
- Tomorrow, In a Year (with The Knife and Planningtorock) (Rabid Records) (2010)

Appears on

- The Hacker - "Traces", from the album Rêves Mécaniques (2004)
- Leila - U&I (2012)

With Citizen King

- Brown Bag LP (1995)
- Count The Days (1996)
- Sydney Hih (1997)
- Mobile Estates (1999)
