= Silent Shout =

Studio album by the Knife
- Released: 17 February 2006
- Recorded: March 2004 – November 2005 in Stockholm
- Genres: Synth-pop; techno; electronic
- Length: 48:36
- Label: Rabid
- Producer: The Knife

The Knife chronology
Hannah med H Soundtrack (2003)	Silent Shout (2006)	Tomorrow, in a Year (2010)

Singles from Silent Shout
- 1. "Silent Shout" Released: 20 February 2006; 2. "Marble House" Released: 1 March 2006; 3. "We Share Our Mothers' Health" Released: May 2006; 4. "Like a Pen" Released: 16 October 2006

Silent Shout is the third studio album by Swedish electronic music duo the Knife, released on 17 February 2006 by Rabid Records. The album is darker than its predecessor, Deep Cuts (2003). It spawned four singles: "Silent Shout", "Marble House", "We Share Our Mothers' Health" and "Like a Pen".

The album, the music video for the title track and some of the press photos were inspired by the work of German-American animator Oskar Fischinger and the comic book series Black Hole by American cartoonist Charles Burns.

A three-disc deluxe edition of Silent Shout was released in Europe on 2 July 2007 and in the US on 17 July. In addition to the studio album, this package includes the DVD Silent Shout: An Audio Visual Experience (which contains the Knife's live concert in Gothenburg on 12 April 2006, as part of their Silent Shout tour, and all of the duo's music videos to date), as well as a CD of the concert's audio.

== Music and composition ==
Silent Shout is a synth-pop and techno album. The collaboration between Olof and Karin Dreijer was described by the French pop culture magazine Magic as Jay-Jay Johanson meets Siouxsie. Pitchfork viewed Karin's performance on the album as a "shrill voice (think Björk by way of Ari Up by way of Siouxsie Sioux by way of Mu's Mutsumi Kanamori)". Karin's multi-tracked vocals were frequently pitch-shifted to produce a "creepy result". The Austin Chronicle also said that sonically, the music merged "Siouxsie Sioux with Aphex Twin".

== Critical reception ==
Professional ratings
Aggregate scores
Source	Rating
Metacritic	74/100
Review scores
Source	Rating
AllMusic	5/5 stars
The Guardian	4/5 stars
The Irish Times	4/5 stars
MSN Music (Consumer Guide)	A−
The Observer	4/5 stars
Pitchfork	8.6/10
Resident Advisor	3.5/5
Slant Magazine	4.5/5 stars
Spin	4/5 stars
Uncut	4/5 stars

Silent Shout received generally positive reviews from music critics. At Metacritic, which assigns a normalised rating out of 100 to reviews from mainstream publications, the album received an average score of 74, based on 22 reviews. Pitchfork named it the best album of 2006 and the title track the second best song. The song was also listed at number 74 on the website's list of "The Top 500 Tracks of the 2000s", while the album was placed at number 15 on its list of "The Top 200 Albums of the 2000s". The album placed 15th in The Wire's year-end critics' poll.

Resident Advisor named Silent Shout the second best album of 2006 and ninth best album of the 2000s decade. In 2009, the album was included at number five on Clash's "Essential 50" list. Silent Shout was placed at number 95 on Slant Magazine's list of the best albums of the 2000s. musicOMH, when compiling its "21 Best Albums of the 2000s" list, placed the album at number seven. On their "50 Greatest Albums of the 2000s" feature, Gigwise placed the album at number seven, calling it "ground-breaking" and stating, "On the first spin it's baffling, second it's intriguing, but many listens in and you realize that Karin and Olaf [sic] Dreijer have concocted a masterpiece of their genre."

The album was ranked number 83 on Pitchfork's People's List, a readers' poll of the 200 best albums from Pitchfork's first 15 years (1996–2011).

== Commercial performance ==
As of January 2013, Silent Shout had sold 65,000 copies in the United States, according to Nielsen SoundScan. In October 2011, the album was awarded a gold certification from the Independent Music Companies Association (IMPALA), which indicated sales in excess of 75,000 copies throughout Europe.

== Track listing ==
All lyrics are written by the Knife, except where noted; all music is composed by the Knife.

No.	Title	Length
1.	"Silent Shout"	4:53
2.	"Neverland"	3:38
3.	"The Captain"	6:08
4.	"We Share Our Mothers' Health"	4:11
5.	"Na Na Na"	2:27
6.	"Marble House" (lyrics: the Knife, Jay-Jay Johanson)	5:18
7.	"Like a Pen"	6:13
8.	"From Off to On"	3:58
9.	"Forest Families"	4:08
10.	"One Hit"	4:27
11.	"Still Light"	3:15
Total length:		48:36

=== Deluxe edition ===
Disc two: Silent Shout: An Audio Visual Experience (live audio)
No.	Title	Length
1.	"Pass This On"	5:38
2.	"The Captain"	6:10
3.	"We Share Our Mothers' Health"	4:27
4.	"You Make Me Like Charity"	4:20
5.	"Marble House"	5:00
6.	"Forest Families"	4:22
7.	"Kino"	4:56
8.	"Heartbeats"	4:22
9.	"Silent Shout"	5:25
10.	"From Off to On"	5:30

Disc three (DVD): Silent Shout: An Audio Visual Experience and music videos
No.	Title	Director(s)	Length
1.	"Pass This On"		5:38
2.	"The Captain"		6:10
3.	"We Share Our Mothers' Health"		4:27
4.	"You Make Me Like Charity"		4:20
5.	"Marble House"		5:00
6.	"Forest Families"		4:22
7.	"Kino"		4:56
8.	"Heartbeats"		4:22
9.	"Silent Shout"		5:25
10.	"From Off to On"		5:30
11.	"N.Y. Hotel" (music video)	Andreas Korsár; Andreas Nilsson
12.	"Heartbeats" (music video)	Nilsson; Johannes Nyholm; Bo Melin
13.	"You Take My Breath Away" (music video)	Henry Moore Selder
14.	"Pass This On" (music video)	Johan Renck
15.	"Handy-Man" (music video)	Bold Faces
16.	"You Take My Breath Away II" (music video)	Peter Geschwind
17.	"Silent Shout" (music video)	Nilsson
18.	"Marble House I" (music video)	Björn Renner
19.	"We Share Our Mothers' Health" (music video)	Motomichi Nakamura
20.	"Like a Pen" (music video)	Nilsson
21.	"Marble House II" (music video)	Chris Hopewell
22.	"When I Found The Knife" (short film)	Vardag	5:04

== Personnel ==
Credits adapted from the liner notes of Silent Shout.

- The Knife – recording, programming, production, vocals, mixing
- Jay-Jay Johanson – vocals (track 6)
- Christoffer Berg – mixing (tracks 1–7, 9, 11)
- Pelle Gunnerfeldt – mixing (tracks 8, 10)
- Henrik Jonsson – mastering
- Johan Toorell – artwork

== Charts ==
=== Weekly charts ===
Weekly chart performance for Silent Shout
Chart (2006–2007)	Peak position
Australian Dance Albums (ARIA)	15
Belgian Albums (Ultratop Flanders)	47
European Albums (Billboard)	55
Norwegian Albums (VG-lista)	25
Swedish Albums (Sverigetopplistan)	1
UK Independent Albums (Official Charts)	28
US Top Dance Albums (Billboard)	12

=== Year-end charts ===
Year-end chart performance for Silent Shout
Chart (2006)	Position
Swedish Albums (Sverigetopplistan)	46

== Release history ==
Release history for Silent Shout
Region	Date	Edition	Label	Ref.
Sweden	17 February 2006	Standard	Rabid	
Germany	17 March 2006	Standard	V2	
United Kingdom	20 March 2006	Standard	Brille	
Australia	17 May 2006	Standard	Hussle	
Sweden	2 July 2006	Deluxe	Rabid	
United Kingdom	2 July 2006	Deluxe	Brille	
United States	17 July 2006	Deluxe	Mute	
United States	25 July 2006	Standard	Mute	
