= We Share Our Mothers' Health =

Single by the Knife

from the album Silent Shout
- Released: May 2006 (Sweden); 24 July 2006 (UK); 25 September 2006 (US)
- Genre: Electronica; tech house
- Label: Rabid
- Songwriter(s): The Knife
- Producer(s): The Knife

The Knife singles chronology
"Marble House" (2006)	"We Share Our Mothers' Health" (2006)	"Like a Pen" (2006)

Music video
- "We Share Our Mothers' Health" on YouTube

"We Share Our Mothers' Health" is a song by Swedish electronic music duo the Knife from their third studio album, Silent Shout (2006). It was released in May 2006 as the album's third single. Pitchfork Media ranked it at number fourteen on The Top 100 Tracks of 2006.

== Music video ==
The music video for the song is an animated video directed and animated by Motomichi Nakamura. It is available online, on the enhanced US CD single, and on the Silent Shout: An Audio Visual Experience CD/DVD. Motomichi wrote about the video, "The animation starts with a girl that wakes up from a long sleep and starts searching for a sacred apple. At the end of a nightmarish story the girl is able to find her apple but only to discover the real price that she has to pay for it."

== Track listings ==
- Swedish CD single
1. "We Share Our Mothers' Health (Radio Edit)" - 3:32
2. "We Share Our Mothers' Health (Trentemøller Remix)" - 8:01
3. "We Share Our Mothers' Health (Original Version)" - 4:09
- UK CD single
1. "We Share Our Mothers' Health (Radio Edit)" - 3:34
2. "Kino (Live)" - 5:13
3. "We Share Our Mothers' Health (Trentemøller Remix)" - 8:02
- UK CD-R, Promo single
1. "We Share Our Mothers' Health (Original Version)" - 4:14
2. "We Share Our Mothers' Health (Trentemøller Remix)" - 8:03
3. "We Share Our Mothers' Health (Radio Slave's Secret Base Remix)" - 9:02
4. "We Share Our Mothers' Health (Ratatat Remix)" - 4:02
- UK 7-inch single
1. "We Share Our Mothers' Health (Radio Edit)" - 3:28
2. "We Share Our Mothers' Health (Ratatat Remix)" - 3:55
- UK 12-inch single
1. "We Share Our Mothers' Health (Trentemøller Remix)" - 7:58
2. "We Share Our Mothers' Health (Album Version)" - 4:06
3. "We Share Our Mothers' Health (Radio Slave's Secret Base Remix)" - 8:57
- Europe 12-inch single
1. "We Share Our Mothers' Health (Trentemøller Remix)" - 7:58
2. "We Share Our Mothers' Health (Album Version)" - 4:06
3. "We Share Our Mothers' Health (Radio Slave's Secret Base Remix)" - 8:57
- US CD, Maxi single
1. "We Share Our Mothers' Health (Radio Edit)" - 3:35
2. "We Share Our Mothers' Health (Trentemøller Remix)" - 8:04
3. "We Share Our Mothers' Health (Radioslave Remix)" - 9:03
4. "We Share Our Mothers' Health (Album Version)" - 4:13
5. "Kino (Live)" - 5:11
6. "We Share Our Mothers' Health (Music Video)"

== Charts ==
Chart (2006)	Peak Position
UK Singles Chart	85
U.S. Hot Dance Singles Sales	18
