= Shaking the Habitual =

Studio album by the Knife
- Released: 5 April 2013
- Recorded: 2010–2012
- Studio: Stockholm and Berlin
- Genre: Electronic; experimental
- Length: 77:18 (1-disc version); 96:20 (2-disc version)
- Label: Rabid
- Producer: The Knife

The Knife chronology
Tomorrow, in a Year (2010)	Shaking the Habitual (2013)

Singles from Shaking the Habitual
- 1. "Full of Fire" Released: 28 January 2013; 2. "A Tooth for an Eye" Released: 18 February 2013; 3. "Raging Lung" Released: 2 September 2013; 4. "Without You My Life Would Be Boring" Released: 20 May 2014

Shaking the Habitual is the fourth and final studio album by Swedish electronic music duo the Knife. It was released on 5 April 2013 by Rabid Records. The album was released as a double CD and triple LP, and as a digital download. The album was lauded by critics at the time of its release and was featured on several critics' year-end lists.

"Full of Fire" was released as the album's lead single on 28 January 2013. An accompanying short film was directed by Marit Östberg, who contributed a film to the 2009 Swedish feminist porn compilation Dirty Diaries. The album's second single, "A Tooth for an Eye", was released on 18 February 2013, for which a music video was directed by Roxy Farhat and Kakan Hermansson. The duo embarked on the Shaking the Habitual Tour in support of the album, starting on 26 April 2013 in Bremen, Germany.

== Background ==
On 18 April 2011, it was announced that the Knife was recording a new album, initially set to be released in 2012, through a post on the duo's website about the housing rights of Romani people in Rome. Shaking the Habitual was officially announced on 12 December 2012, along with a teaser video posted on YouTube. The album was recorded in Stockholm and Berlin from 2010 to 2012.

In October 2012, Shannon Funchess of Brooklyn-based electronic music duo Light Asylum revealed in interviews with Dazed & Confused and music blog No Conclusion that she would contribute vocals to a track on the album, with lyrics written by visual artist Emily Roysdon.

For the artwork of Shaking the Habitual, the duo commissioned Malmö-based illustrator Liv Strömquist to design a comic book titled End Extreme Wealth that turns the right wing's discourse against the poor on its head, depicting the 1% as a culturally-impoverished and vermin-like "other". "It came out of the idea, 'How do we use the area of the record cover in the best political way?'" Olof Dreijer said. "It's about bringing focus to extreme wealth rather than poverty being the problem of the world."

== Themes and influences ==
Shaking the Habitual takes its title from a quote by French philosopher Michel Foucault. The album is inspired by the duo's readings in feminist and queer theory, while discussing environmentalism and structuralism. Olof attended a course in gender studies at Stockholm University and shared his reading list with Karin. On 9 April 2013, the Knife released a Marit Östberg-directed video titled "Shaking the Habitual – The Interview", explaining the process of making the album. They state, "What we do is political. That should be impossible to misunderstand." They criticise the institution of the royal family and the nuclear family calling it "an institution that conserves inequality, injustice and exclusion", while advocating for living "in solidarity beyond nuclear families, nations and economical unions." In an interview with Pitchfork, Karin suggested that "people would be happier sharing things and being much more of a collective rather than working from these neo-liberal ideas of just looking after yourself."

The duo also criticise the "commercial homogenisation" of the music industry, saying it constitutes an "extremely hierarchical structure". Speaking to The Guardian, Karin mentioned how music artists are "getting even more commercial because they are selling their music to advertisements and going on tours with big alcohol brands", and questioned "how music and art can continue to develop or challenge itself within these new, very commercial frames." They also spoke of authenticity and quoted philosopher and gender theorist Judith Butler, who says, "We are always in drag".

The video for "Full of Fire", among other things, questions a policy in Sweden that offers tax deductions for wealthy families who employ maids. The line "I'm telling you stories, trust me" in the song "A Tooth for an Eye" is borrowed from Karin's favourite Jeanette Winterson book, The Passion (1987). The interludes "Crake" and "Oryx" are named after characters in Margaret Atwood's 2003 dystopian novel Oryx and Crake. "Old Dreams Waiting to Be Realized" takes its title from an article written by Nina Björk for Swedish magazine Glänta.

== Critical reception ==
Professional ratings
Aggregate scores
Source	Rating
AnyDecentMusic?	8.0/10
Metacritic	85/100
Review scores
Source	Rating
AllMusic	4/5 stars
The A.V. Club	A−
The Daily Telegraph	4/5 stars
The Guardian	3/5 stars
The Independent	4/5 stars
MSN Music (Expert Witness)	A
NME	7/10
Pitchfork	8.4/10
Rolling Stone	3.5/5 stars
Spin	9/10

Shaking the Habitual received widespread acclaim from music critics. At Metacritic, which assigns a normalised rating out of 100 to reviews from mainstream publications, the album received an average score of 85, based on 43 reviews, which indicates "universal acclaim". Robert Christgau of MSN Music praised the album as "an exciting, multivalent Dreijer sibling showcase". Uncut's Rob Young wrote that Karin "possesses one of the most distinctive Scandinavian voices since Björk", referring to the duo's songs as "genetic pop mutations, scampering out of control". Lindsay Zoladz of Pitchfork hailed Shaking the Habitual as the duo's "most political, ambitious, accomplished album, but in a strange way it also feels like its most personal". Philip Sherburne of Spin remarked that the Knife have "never sounded more in tune with the materiality of sound or the sonorousness of the physical world." AllMusic's Heather Phares opined that "Shaking the Habitual isn't as cohesive or accessible as Silent Shout, and after experiencing the whole thing, fans may not return to it often, but it's hard to deny that it's an often stunning work of art", dubbing the album "a testament to the Knife's skill that they make such formidable sounds so compelling for so long". Reviewer Ludovic Hunter-Tilney of the Financial Times praised the entire album, and the singing in a "Siouxsie Sioux-style gravity amid a fusillade of eerie electronic beats", qualifying the result as "foreboding, apocalyptic and strangely exhilarating".

Maya Kalev of Fact noted that "[f]ans of Silent Shout and Deep Cuts [...] will find Shaking the Habitual's hybrid of post-punk, techno, industrial, coldwave, drone and electro-pop discomforting", adding, "At Shaking the Habitual's core are the processes of deconstruction and reconstruction, so rare in the tradition of mostly reiterative pop music that the album feels transgressive". The Independent critic Simon Price described the album as "long [...], strange, disturbing, uncomfortable, challenging. But it never fails to fascinate." Louis Pattison of NME expressed, "Sporadically brilliant, perhaps it is the Knife's Inland Empire—a fearless piece of work with its own logic, one that shears away all safety nets. Invention, stark and undiluted." Anna Wilson of Clash concluded, "Increasingly aggressive and overtly detuned, [Karin and Olof's] individual styles have collided to create something elemental, immense and unsettling. Self-possessed and uncompromising, this is a record with regal bearing." Rolling Stone's Jon Dolan wrote that, compared to Silent Shout, Shaking the Habitual "explores even wilder styles of mordantly nutso android bleat". Eric Henderson of Slant Magazine viewed that most of the album "consign[s] anything remotely hooky into the realm of affectation", and the lyrics are "delivered by some of Karin's most obtuse vocal performances to date, her sinewy androgynous pipes muscling through slide-whistle octaves fearlessly and tunelessly." Hayden Woolley of Drowned in Sound found the album "unnavigable and unknowable, almost impossible to write about and even harder to listen to." The Guardian's Alexis Petridis felt that "Shaking the Habitual's problem is that the Knife seem to have dismissed the idea of making your point concisely as merely another affectation of a decadent and corrupt society", describing the album as "alternately utterly gripping and unbearably boring; incredibly bold and strangely flaccid, viscerally thrilling and hopelessly over-thought."

=== Accolades ===
In March 2014, Shaking the Habitual won the Nordic Music Prize.

Publication	Accolade	Rank	Ref.
The 405	Albums of the Year 2013	21	
Beats Per Minute	The Top 130 Albums (2008–2013)	27	
Clash	Top Albums of 2013	26	
Consequence of Sound	Top 50 Albums of 2013	6	
Crack Magazine	Albums of the Year	12	
Exclaim!	Best of 2013: Top 10 Dance & Electronic Albums	6	
Fact	The 50 Best Albums of 2013	48	
Gaffa (Sweden edition)	Best of 2010-talets	29	
The Line of Best Fit	Best Fit Fifty: Albums of 2013	1	
musicOMH	Top 100 Albums of 2013	93	
NME	50 Best Albums of 2013	43	
Paste	The 50 Best Albums of 2013	21	
Pitchfork	The Top 50 Albums of 2013	14	
Pitchfork	The 100 Best Albums of the Decade So Far (2010–2014)	62	
Pitchfork	The 200 Best Albums of the 2010s	46	
PopMatters	The 75 Best Albums of 2013	3	
Q	50 Albums of 2013	43	
The Quietus	Albums of the Year 2013	22	
Slant Magazine	The 25 Best Albums of 2013	7	
Slant Magazine	The 100 Best Albums of the 2010s	72	
Spin	50 Best Albums of 2013	9	
Stereogum	The 50 Best Albums of 2013	38	
Stereogum	The 100 Best Albums of the 2010s	53	
Tiny Mix Tapes	Favorite 50 Albums of 2013	18	
Tiny Mix Tapes	Favorite 100 Music Releases of the Decade	88	
Uncut	The Best Albums of 2013	22	
Under the Radar	Top 125 Albums of 2013	24	
The Wire	Releases of the Year 1–50	10	
XLR8R	Best of 2013: Releases	17	

== Track listing ==
All tracks are written by the Knife, except where noted.

Disc one
No.	Title	Length
1.	"A Tooth for an Eye"	6:04
2.	"Full of Fire"	9:17
3.	"A Cherry on Top"	8:43
4.	"Without You My Life Would Be Boring"	5:14
5.	"Wrap Your Arms Around Me"	4:36
6.	"Crake"	0:55
7.	"Old Dreams Waiting to Be Realized"	19:02

Disc two
No.	Title	Length
1.	"Raging Lung"	9:58
2.	"Networking"	6:42
3.	"Oryx"	0:37
4.	"Stay Out Here" (with Shannon Funchess and Emily Roysdon; lyrics: Roysdon; music: Funchess, Roysdon, The Knife)	10:42
5.	"Fracking Fluid Injection"	9:54
6.	"Ready to Lose"	4:36

Rough Trade exclusive bonus disc
No.	Title	Length
1.	"A Tooth for an Eye" (Cooly G Remix)	4:21
2.	"A Tooth for an Eye" (Pursuit Grooves Remix)	5:02
3.	"Full of Fire" (music video)
4.	"A Tooth for an Eye" (music video)

Notes

- A single-disc version which omits "Old Dreams Waiting to Be Realized" (included as a bonus download) is also available in several countries.

== Personnel ==
Credits adapted from the liner notes of Shaking the Habitual.

- The Knife – recording, production, mixing
- Shannon Funchess – vocals on "Stay Out Here"
- Mikael Häggström – maracas on "Wrap Your Arms Around Me"
- Johannes Berglund – mixing
- Mandy Parnell – mastering
- Liv Strömquist – comic, typeface Liv Fraktura
- Studio SM – artwork
- Martin Falck – artwork

== Charts ==
Chart (2013)	Peak position
Australian Albums (ARIA)	50
Austrian Albums (Ö3 Austria)	70
Belgian Albums (Ultratop Flanders)	16
Belgian Albums (Ultratop Wallonia)	75
Danish Albums (Hitlisten)	13
Dutch Albums (Album Top 100)	67
Finnish Albums (Suomen virallinen lista)	26
French Albums (SNEP)	193
German Albums (Offizielle Top 100)	67
Irish Albums (IRMA)	30
Irish Independent Albums (IRMA)	3
Norwegian Albums (VG-lista)	22
Scottish Albums (OCC)	30
Swedish Albums (Sverigetopplistan)	8
Swiss Albums (Schweizer Hitparade)	77
UK Albums (OCC)	31
US Billboard 200	52
US Independent Albums (Billboard)	9
US Top Dance Albums (Billboard)	2

== Release history ==
Region	Date	Format	Label	Ref.
Australia	5 April 2013	2-CD; 3-LP + 2-CD; digital download	Pod	
Germany	5 April 2013	CD; 2-CD; digital download	Cooperative	
Sweden	5 April 2013	CD; 2-CD; digital download	Rabid	
United Kingdom	8 April 2013	CD; 2-CD; digital download	Brille	
United States	9 April 2013	CD; 2-CD; 3-LP; digital download	Mute	
Germany	12 April 2013	3-LP + 2-CD	Cooperative	
Sweden	12 April 2013	3-LP + 2-CD	Rabid	
United Kingdom	15 April 2013	3-LP + 2-CD	Brille	
