= Tomorrow, in a Year =

Studio album by the Knife in collaboration with Mt. Sims and Planningtorock
- Released: 1 February 2010
- Recorded: 2008–2009; Berlin, Stockholm, Copenhagen
- Length: 92:22
- Label: Rabid
- Producers: The Knife; Mt. Sims; Planningtorock

The Knife chronology
Silent Shout (2006)	Tomorrow, in a Year (2010)	Shaking the Habitual (2013)

Planningtorock chronology
Have It All (2006)	Tomorrow, in a Year (2010)	W (2011)

Singles from Tomorrow, in a Year
- 1. "Seeds" Released: 7 December 2010

Professional ratings
Aggregate scores
Source	Rating
AnyDecentMusic?	6.9/10
Metacritic	67/100
Review scores
Source	Rating
AllMusic	3.5/5 stars
BBC Music	positive
Drowned in Sound	10/10
MusicOMH	4.5/5 stars
Pitchfork	6.9/10
PopMatters	5/10
Resident Advisor	3.5/5
The Skinny	3/5 stars
Slant Magazine	3.5/5 stars

Tomorrow, in a Year is the studio version of the music commissioned by the Danish performance group Hotel Pro Forma for its opera based on Charles Darwin's On the Origin of Species. It is a collaboration between the Knife, Mt. Sims and Planningtorock. It was released digitally on 1 February 2010 through The Knife's own label Rabid Records prior to the physical release.

The lyrics contain excerpts of Darwin's writings, particularly On the Origin of Species. These are often without context, though the meaning of some songs is clear, for example 'Seeds' refers to Darwin's experiments to determine why certain plants are found on the coasts of many continents, despite their separation, in which he demonstrated that seeds of some plants remain viable after weeks in cold seawater, and 'Annie's Box' refers to the pivotal moment when Darwin's daughter Annie died of tuberculosis, which damaged his Christian faith, helping him to overcome his fears about the church's reaction to On the Origin of Species.

The music appears to have been composed to reflect the long arc of evolution, with the first songs having a hard, noisy and simple quality, subsequent tracks building in beauty and complexity, and incorporating progressively more lyrics and musical sounds based on animal vocalisations. Choreography was also inspired by animal behaviour including the courtship dances of birds. The opera was completed in 2009 to mark the 150th anniversary of the publication of On the Origin of Species and toured Europe in 2010.

The album was recorded, mixed and produced in Berlin, Stockholm and Copenhagen between 2008 and 2009. Recording for the live percussion took place at Sounds Studio in Iceland, while outdoor sounds were recorded at the Mamori Artlab Workshop on the Amazon River, Brazil. Tomorrow, In a Year features guest appearances by mezzo-soprano Kristina Wahlin, Danish actress Lærke Winther Andersen and Swedish pop artist Jonathan Johansson.

== Track listing ==
Disc one
No.	Title	Music	Length
1.	"Intro"	The Knife	4:32
2.	"Epochs"	The Knife, Mt. Sims	5:43
3.	"Geology"	The Knife, Mt. Sims	4:24
4.	"Upheaved"	The Knife, Mt. Sims	3:03
5.	"Minerals"	The Knife, Mt. Sims	1:18
6.	"Ebb Tide Explorer"	The Knife, Mt. Sims	7:06
7.	"Variation of Birds"	The Knife, Mt. Sims	6:41
8.	"Letter to Henslow"	The Knife, Mt. Sims, Planningtorock	2:01
9.	"Schoal Swarm Orchestra"	The Knife, Planningtorock	8:36

Disc two
No.	Title	Music	Length
1.	"Annie's Box"	The Knife	4:28
2.	"Tumult"	The Knife	3:28
3.	"Colouring of Pigeons"	The Knife, Mt. Sims	11:01
4.	"Seeds"	The Knife, Mt. Sims	9:00
5.	"Tomorrow in a Year"	The Knife, Mt. Sims	12:20
6.	"The Height of Summer"	The Knife	3:47
7.	"Annie's Box" (Alt. Vocal) (bonus track)	The Knife	4:54

== Personnel ==
Credits for Tomorrow, In a Year adapted from album liner notes.

- The Knife – engineering, live percussion re-editing, mixing, production (all tracks); halldorophone re-editing (1.6, 2.3); vocals (1.8, 2.3, 2.7)
- Mt. Sims – engineering, live percussion re-editing, mixing, production (all tracks); halldorophone re-editing (1.6, 2.3); vocals (1.7, 1.8, 2.5)
- Planningtorock – engineering, live percussion re-editing, mixing, production (all tracks); vocals (1.7, 1.8)
- Rashad Becker – mastering
- Johannes Berglund – vocal engineering (2.3)
- Bold Faces – artwork
- Kyle Gudmundson – live percussion engineering
- Hildur Guðnadóttir – halldorophone (1.6, 2.3); cello (2.1, 2.3, 2.7)
- Jonathan Johansson – vocals (1.6, 1.7, 2.3–2.5)
- Hjörleifur Jónsson – drums (2.3); live percussion (all tracks)
- Kristina Wahlin – vocals (1.2–1.5, 1.7, 2.1, 2.3–2.5)
- Lærke Winther – vocals (1.4, 1.7, 2.3, 2.5, 2.6)

== Charts ==
Chart (2010)	Peak position
Belgian Albums Chart (Flanders)	79
Swedish Albums Chart	24
US Dance/Electronic Albums	10
US Heatseekers Albums	32

== Release history ==
Region	Date	Label	Format
Germany	1 February 2010	Cooperative Music	Digital download
Sweden	1 February 2010	Rabid Records	Digital download
United States	2 February 2010	Mute Records	Digital download
Australia	5 February 2010	Etcetc	Digital download
Sweden	26 February 2010	Rabid Records	2CD
Australia	5 March 2010	Etcetc	2CD
Germany	5 March 2010	Cooperative Music	2CD
United Kingdom	8 March 2010	Brille Records	2CD
United States	9 March 2010	Mute Records	2CD
United Kingdom	30 November 2012	Brille Records	Digital download

== Critical reception ==
Drownedinsound gave the studio album 10/10, describing it as "coldly overwhelming". Pitchfork reviewed the album 6.9/10, saying the album "either demands your full attention or invites you to turn it off". BBC Music described the album as "complicated, esoteric and, yes, really quite bonkers". The opera was rated 3/5 by the Guardian, with the reviewer criticising the harsh sound of the first several tracks, the very gradual introduction of vocals and the contextless way in which Darwin's writing was generally presented.
