= Vega, Copenhagen =

Concert venue in Copenhagen, Denmark

Coordinates: 55°40′05″N 12°32′38″E

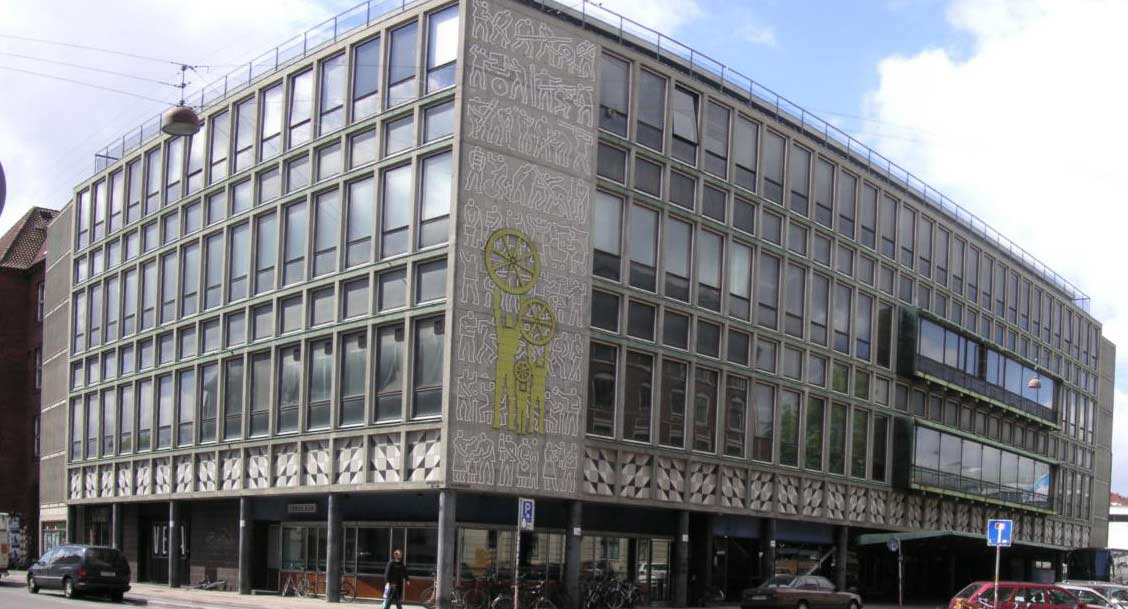
Vega, Copenhagen

Vega is a regional entertainment centre on Vesterbro in Copenhagen, Denmark. It was inaugurated in 1996 as part of the city's agenda as European Capital of Culture.

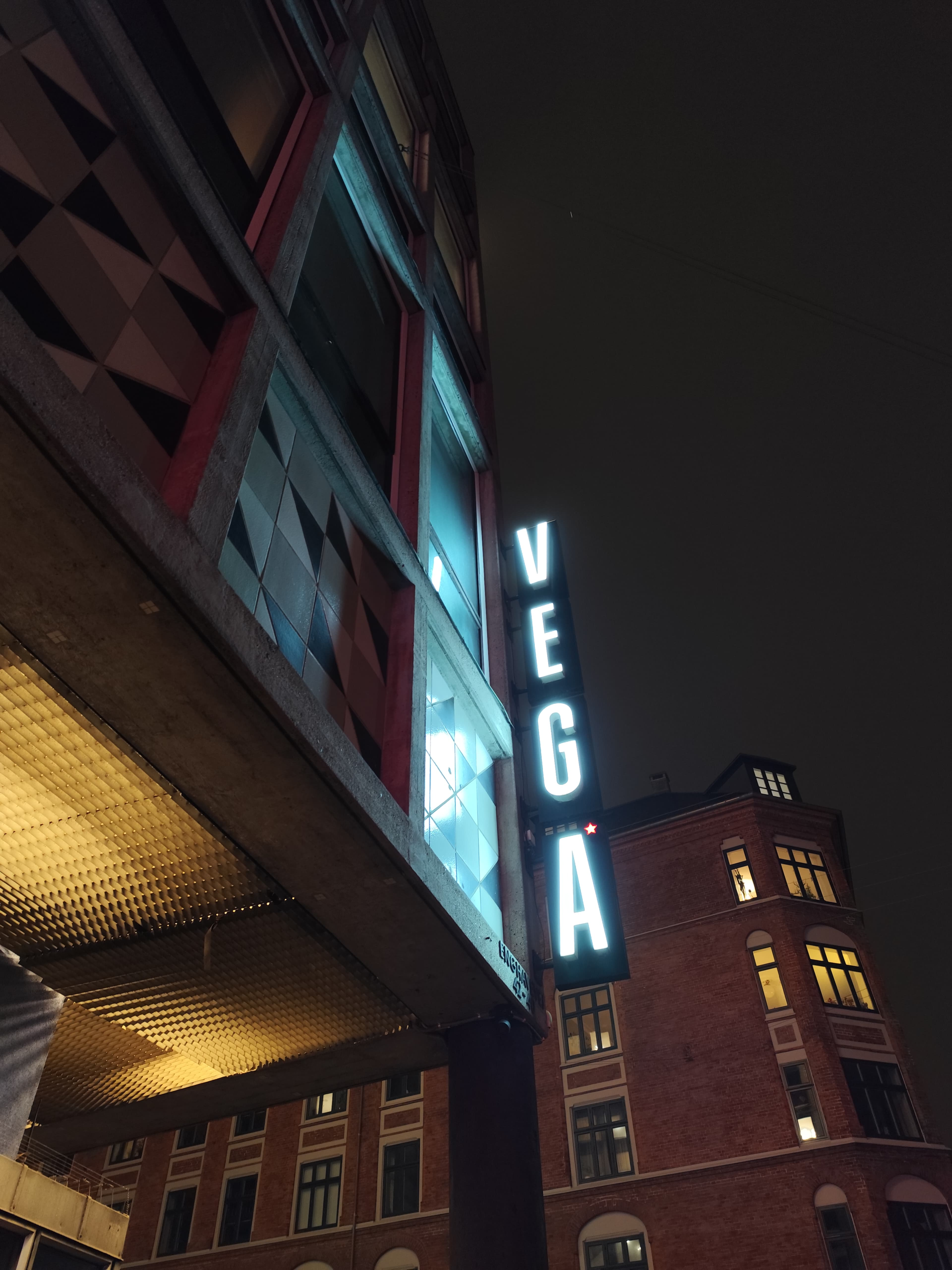
Vega sign at night-time

== Description ==
Originally known as Folkets Hus, it was built in 1956 to a design by Vilhelm Lauritzen who also designed Copenhagen Airport. After full renovation, it opened as a music centre in 1996. In addition to its large and small concert halls (with capacities of 1,150 and 500), it has many smaller rooms suited to different kinds of function including cultural exhibitions and press conferences. In 2012, some 250,000 people visited the centre in which top Scandinavian and international entertainers have performed.
