= Marble House (song) =

Single by the Knife

from the album Silent Shout
- B-side: "Marble House" Remixes
- Released: 1 March 2006
- Recorded: 2004–2005 in Stockholm
- Genre: Synthpop
- Length: 5:18
- Label: Rabid
- Songwriter(s): Karin Dreijer; Olof Dreijer; Jay-Jay Johanson
- Producer(s): The Knife

The Knife singles chronology
"Silent Shout" (2006)	"Marble House" (2006)	"We Share Our Mothers' Health" (2006)

"Marble House" is a song by Swedish electronic music duo the Knife from their third studio album, Silent Shout (2006). It features contributing vocals from fellow Swedish singer Jay-Jay Johanson.

== Reception ==
CMJ New Music Monthly called the song a "real gem" with "playfully flirtatious lyrics", while The Guardian called it the "most commercial song" on the album, and described it as a "synth-pop Kurt Weill duet".

== Music video ==
Two music videos have been made for this song, both of which can be found on the deluxe edition of Silent Shout. The first version, directed by Björn Renner, depicts an early 20th-century or late 19th-century family. The second video depicts a day in the lives of a family of mice, who have built a fairly comfortable house behind a wall in a human house. It uses stop-motion animation and was directed by Chris Hopewell.

=== Track listing ===
Sweden CD

1. "Marble House (Radio Edit)" - 3:33
2. "Marble House (Album Version)" - 5:16
3. "Marble House (PTR Remix)" - 3:43

Europe 12"

- Side A
1. "Marble House (Rex the Dog Remix)" - 6:43
2. "Marble House (Booka Shade's Polar Light Dub)" - 7:14
- Side B
1. "Marble House (Booka Shade Remix)" - 7:24
2. "Marble House (PTR Remix)" - 3:43

UK CD

1. "Marble House (Radio Edit)" - 3:45
2. "Marble House (Rex the Dog Remix Edit)" - 3:24
3. "Marble House (Rex the Dog Remix)" - 6:31
4. "Marble House (Booka Shade Polar Light Remix)" - 7:49

UK 12"

1. "Marble House (Emperor Machine Remix)"
2. "Marble House (Booka Shade's Polar Light Remix)"

UK 7" track list

1. "Marble House (Radio Edit)" - 3:45
2. "Marble House (davidandrewsitek's KNIFEHORSE Remix)" - 4:13

US CD

1. "Marble House (Radio Edit)"
2. "Marble House (davidandrewsitek's KNIFEHORSE Remix)"
3. "Marble House (Planningtorock Remix)"
4. "Marble House (Emperor Machine Vox Edit)"
5. "Marble House (Rex the Dog Remix)"
6. "Marble House (Booka Shade Remix)"
7. "Marble House" (Video)

US 12"

- Side A
1. "Marble House (Rex the Dog Remix)"
2. "Marble House (Booka Shade's Polar Light Remix)"
- Side B
1. "Marble House (Booka Shade Remix)"
2. "Marble House (Planningtorock Remix)"
