= Planningtorock =

English musician and record producer (born 1972)

- Also known as: Jam Rostron
- Born: 26 January 1972 (age 54); Bolton, England
- Genre: Electropop
- Occupations: Vocalist; songwriter; record producer; music video director
- Years active: 2004–present
- Labels: Rostron; Human Level; DFA

Jam Rahuoja Rostron (born 25 January 1972), known by their stage name Planningtorock, is an English electronic musician and record producer who lives in Tallinn, Estonia. Rostron is transgender and non-binary, and uses they/them and he/him pronouns.

== Career ==
=== 2004–2005 ===
In 2004, Rostron launched their label Rostron Records with Planningtorock's EP Eins, following it in 2005 with a compilation LP Carousel of Souls that featured songs from The Knife and The Soft Pink Truth. They sang backing vocals on the Badly Drawn Boy track "Outside is a Light 2", a B-side from the 1999 single "It Came From the Ground".

=== 2006–2009: Have It All ===
After signing to Chicks on Speed's record label in 2006, Planningtorock released the limited edition 7" single "Changes/I Wanna Bite Ya", before their debut album was released the following summer.

In 2006, Planningtorock remixed the song "Marble House" by The Knife.

=== 2010–2011: Tomorrow, in a Year and W ===
In 2010, Planningtorock collaborated with The Knife and Mount Sims to write an opera for the Danish performance group Hotel Pro Forma. The opera, titled Tomorrow, In a Year, is based on Charles Darwin's On the Origin of Species. Tomorrow, In a Year was released on 9 March 2010 by Mute Records and received generally favourable reviews from contemporary critics; according to the music review aggregator Metacritic, it garnered an average score of 67/100.

Rostron worked as the sound designer and composer for the Bruce LaBruce film The Bad Breast; or, The Strange Case of Theda Lange in 2010.

Rostron began correspondence with James Murphy after he sent them a fan email that said "Really like the Planningtorock stuff – just saying". Murphy later invited them on LCD Soundsystem's Sound of Silver tour before signing them to his label DFA Records. Planningtorock co-wrote the song "Answering Machine" from the album From the Cradle to the Rave by DFA label-mate Shit Robot in 2010. DFA released Rostron's second studio album, W, on 23 May 2011. Rostron had been working on the album's songs since 2007, eventually writing more than 27 songs. W received positive reviews from contemporary critics; according to the music review aggregator Metacritic, it garnered an average score of 72/100. The album included a cover of Arthur Russell's song "Janine."

=== 2012–2013: EPs and All Love's Legal ===
In an interview with Resident Advisor, Rostron stated: "Last summer after touring W, I had a bit of a creative meltdown and wasn't sure about making music any more—then I wrote 'Patriarchy Over And Out', and suddenly the goal of the next album became clear". During this period Rostron legally changed their name to Jam. They also revealed that in the spring of 2012 they set up a studio space with Olof Dreijer (of The Knife), Hermione Frank (also known as rRoxymore), and Paula Temple.

Rostron states that "Patriarchy Over And Out" was a turning point "which was the beginning of being more direct and experimenting with being more political".

On 8 March 2013, Rostron released Misogyny Drop Dead EP and in mid-July released "Let's Talk About Gender Baby", a vinyl-only remix of "Full of Fire" by The Knife.

On 29 October 2013, Rostron announced a third studio album All Love's Legal along with a music video for its opening track "Welcome".

=== 2018–2019: Powerhouse ===
On 31 August 2018, Rostron released "Transome" as the lead single from their fourth studio album, Powerhouse. It was followed by a second album track, "Much To Touch", on 12 October 2018. Both were released via Human Level / DFA Records. Powerhouse includes several tracks in which Rostron sings about their family and childhood in Bolton, England. The title track is a tribute to Rostron's mother; Rostron has said, "She's basically the powerhouse of the record. It was the hardest track to write, to pin down and express my love and adoration for my mum, because there's so many things that she's done for me, for the family, for my sister. She's the powerhouse, for sure."

=== 2020-present: Gay Dreams Do Come True ===
On 22 July 2020 Rostron released the EP, Planningtochanel, on Human Level. The six songs found on PlanningtoChanel originate from a collaboration between Planningtorock and Chanel sound director Michel Gaubert which soundtracked the Parisian fashion house's Autumn-Winter 2020 show earlier that year. This release exemplified Rostrom's approach to music which they described as seeking new ways to 'queering sound' in an interview with Pop Matters. Another fashion-focused production then followed with the release of Planningtokenzo, an eleven-minute release from 26 March 2021 that was originally commissioned to soundtrack the Fall/Winter 2021 collection from Japanese fashion brand Kenzo.

On 22 June 2021 Planningtorock announced Gay Dreams Do Come True, a new EP on Human Level that was conceived in the aftermath of getting married, and celebrated the all-consuming joy of their queer love and the sense of belonging and safety that can came with it. "I feel there's something very political about owning queer happiness", Jam said, "cutting it out and saying: we have a right to be happy. I want to make quite blatantly gay music to take up space. I felt like I was gay-dreaming on the day Riinu and I got married! There were little birds and stars around my head." The EP featured a series of hand illustrated portraits made of queer and trans friends of Planningtorock that tied to each song celebrating queer love by Korean Illustrator Joyce Lee. A series of remixes for each track from Gay Dreams Do Come True were also released with contributions from Parisian ballroom artist and legend Kiddy Smile, English ATRIP, French artist rRoxymore, British producer and DJ Maya Jane Coles, Belgian artist The Magician, Hot Chip's Joe Goddard, Ukrainian producer Alinka and British duo Kassian.

Planningtorock was among the artists who featured on Kick IIII, the third of LPs released by Arca in 2021 for XL Recordings. Their collaboration, "Queer", was described as "a regal, fist-in-the-air anthem set to a gargantuan gothic trap beat" in Philip Sherburne's Pitchfork review of Alejandra Ghersi's extensive album project.

In addition to original music and collaborations, there have been a number of high-profile Planningtorock remix commissions in the past few years. In August 2019, Planningtorock's remix of "Ever Again" by Robyn was released as part of the Swedish singer's campaign for the album Honey. Their 'Queered Version' of "La Vita Nuova" by French artist Christine & The Queens was included alongside remixes by A.G. Cook and Danielle Baldelli & Marco Dionigi on the La Vita Nuova (Remixes) released on 28 August 2020 on Because Music.

In 2021, Planningtorock remixed Lady Gaga's "1000 Doves" for the US singer's Dawn of Chromatica remix album which also featured Arca, Rina Sawayama, Shygirl, Mura Masa, Charli XCX, and A. G. Cook. A Planningtorock remix of Moby's cover of "Heroes" by David Bowie was included on the Reprise - Remixes album released on Deutsche Grammophon in May 2022, which saw a cast of modern producers from house, techno, ambient and modern classical circles rework music from the US artist's 2021 album Reprise.

== Artistry ==
Rostron's formative influences included the electronic artists Erasure, Yazoo, Orchestral Manoeuvres in the Dark and Bronski Beat. Planningtorock has stated that the distortion of their vocals allows for the "playing around with gender alongside communicating what I feel is the emotions within the songs. Because I am really interested in expanding upon the limits that we live in – how we are defined – and it is an experiment".

== Discography ==
=== Studio albums ===
- Have It All (2006)
- W (2011)
- All Love's Legal (2014)
- Powerhouse (2018)

=== Collaborations ===
- Tomorrow, In a Year (with The Knife and Mount Sims) (2010) No. 79 Belgium (Flanders), No. 24 Sweden, No. 10 US Billboard Dance/Electronic Albums, No. 32 US Billboard Heatseekers Albums

=== Extended plays ===
- Eins (2004)
- Topics on a Foreign Mind (2004)
- Have It All Stringed Up (2006)
- Misogyny Drop Dead EP (2013)
- Gay Dreams Do Come True (2021)

=== Mixtapes ===
- RA.266 (2011) (for Resident Advisor)

=== Singles ===
- "Changes" / "I Wanna Bite Ya" (2005)
- "Doorway" (2011)
- "The Breaks" (2011)
- "Living It Out" (2011)
- "Patriarchy Over & Out" (2012)
- "Misogyny Drop Dead" (2013)
- "Human Drama" (2014)
- "Transome" (2018)
- "Much to Touch (2018)

=== Remixes ===
- The Knife – "Heartbeats" (2005)
- The Knife – "Marble House" (2006)
- Telepathe – "Devil's Trident" (2008)
- Austra – "Lose It" (2011)
- CREEP featuring Nina Sky – "You" (2011)
- Vicious Circle – "Cerebre" (2012)
- The Knife – '"Let's Talk About Gender Baby, Let's Talk About You And Me" (Full of Fire Rework)
- Robyn - "Ever Again" (2019)
- Zhala - "Holes" (2020)
- Perfume Genius - "Jason" (2021)
- Lady Gaga - "1000 Doves" (2021)
- Messer - "Boy in the Pictures" (2021)
- Moby - "Heroes" (2022)
- Oliver Sim - "Fruit" (2023)
- ionnalee - "innocence of sound" (2024)
