= Like a Pen =

Single by the Knife

from the album Silent Shout
- Released: 16 October 2006
- Genre: Tech house; synth-pop
- Length: 6:13
- Label: Rabid
- Songwriter: The Knife
- Producer: The Knife

The Knife singles chronology
"We Share Our Mothers' Health" (2006)	"Like a Pen" (2006)	"Seeds" (2010)

Music video
- "Like a Pen" on YouTube

"Like a Pen" is a song by Swedish electronic music duo the Knife from their third studio album, Silent Shout (2006). It was released as the album's fourth and final single on 16 October 2006 in the United Kingdom and on 28 November in the United States.

== Track listings ==
- Swedish CD maxi single
1. "Like a Pen" (Radio Edit) – 3:33
2. "Like a Pen" (Album Version) – 6:15
3. "Like a Pen" (Club Mix) – 8:18
4. "Like a Pen" (Demo Version) – 5:28
5. "Like a Pen" (Heartthrob Remix) -6:29
6. "Like a Pen" (Thomas Schumacher Dub) – 8:15
7. "Like a Pen" (Heartthrob Dub) – 5:19
- UK CD maxi single
1. "Like a Pen" (Radio Edit) – 3:24
2. "Like a Pen" (Extended Club Mix) -8:18
3. "Like a Pen" (Heartthrob Remix) – 6:29
4. "Like a Pen" (Heartthrob Dub) – 5:19
5. "Like a Pen" (Thomas Schumacher Dub) – 8:15

== Charts ==
Chart (2006)	Peak position
UK Singles Chart	96
US Hot Dance Singles Sales	15

== Critical reception ==
Neil Jones of MusicOMH commented that "when it comes down to it, this single thrills you inside, possibly because of, and never despite, its ultra-artistic veneer." By contrast, Alex Lai of Contactmusic.com said, "those who are not fans of the genre are unlikely to find the mid-pace bleeps and samples appealing" and that Karin Dreijer's voice is "not best used here."
