= The Knife =

Swedish electronic music duo (1999–2014)

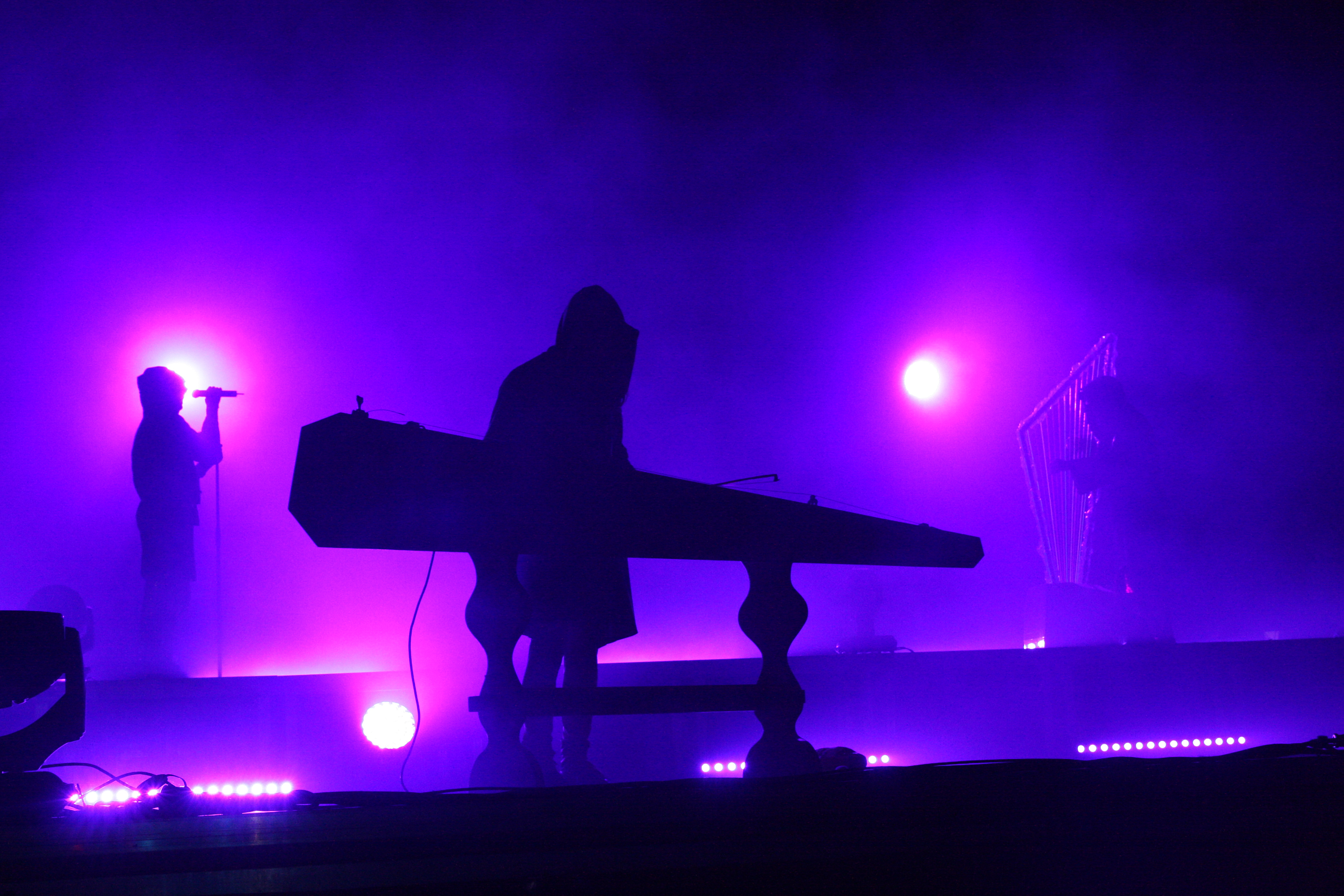
- The Knife performing at Melt! Festival in 2013

Background information
- Origin: Gothenburg, Sweden
- Genres: Electronic; synth-pop; experimental
- Years active: 1999–2014
- Labels: Rabid; Brille; Mute; V2
- Past members: Karin Dreijer; Olof Dreijer
- Website: theknife.net

The Knife were a Swedish electronic music duo from Gothenburg, formed in 1999. The group consisted of siblings Karin and Olof Dreijer, who together also run their own record company, Rabid Records. They gained a large international following in response to their 2003 album Deep Cuts.

The duo's first tour took place in 2006, along with the release of their critically acclaimed album Silent Shout. They have won a number of Swedish Grammis, but refused to attend award ceremonies. They have appeared in public wearing Venetian masks. As Fever Ray, Karin released their self-titled solo album in 2009, while Olof released several EPs as Oni Ayhun in late 2009 and early 2010. The Knife disbanded in November 2014 after releasing their acclaimed 2013 album Shaking the Habitual and completing its attendant tour.

== History ==
Formed in Gothenburg in 1999, amidst the deterioration of Karin's former group Honey Is Cool, the group gained stronger international recognition when José González covered their song "Heartbeats" on his 2003 album, Veneer. The cover was used by Sony in a commercial for Bravia television sets, and released as a single in 2006. The group commented on this in a Dagens Nyheter article, saying that Sony paid a large sum of money to use the song. Despite the group's anti-commercial views, they justified the transaction by citing their need for money to establish a record company.

Having never before performed live, the Knife went on tour in 2006, and after selling out shows worldwide, a DVD of the tour was announced. The DVD was released in Sweden on 8 November 2006, and is titled Silent Shout: An Audio Visual Experience.

On 4 August 2009, the band announced that, in collaboration with Mt. Sims and Planningtorock, they would be writing an opera for the Danish performance group Hotel Pro Forma. The opera, titled Tomorrow, in a Year, is based on Charles Darwin's On the Origin of Species. In January 2010, the band announced that they would release a studio version on 1 March.

In a September 2010 post on the official Fever Ray website, Karin stated that the siblings had "started playing together again", hinting that new material might be on the way. On 18 April 2011, as part of a post on their website concerning discrimination against Romani people in Europe, the Knife announced that they were recording a new album to be released in 2012. In December 2012, it was confirmed that their next album would be titled Shaking the Habitual and would be released on 8 April 2013. The duo posted a teaser trailer for the album on their YouTube account with the message: "Music can be so meaningless. We had to find lust. We asked our friends and lovers to help us." The album was supported by tour dates in Europe in 2013. "Full of Fire" was released as the album's lead single on 28 January 2013, for which a short film was directed by Stockholm and Berlin-based filmmaker and visual artist Marit Östberg.

After announcing their plans to play at Coachella Valley Music and Arts Festival in April 2013, the Knife also announced plans to tour North America during that time period. On 21 August 2014, the Knife announced that the duo would disband following the final six dates of their Shaking the Habitual Show Tour from 31 October to 8 November 2014. In the duo's final interview, Karin told Dazed, "We don't have any obligations to continue, it should only and always be for fun."

The Knife played their final show, entitled Post-Colonial Gender Politics Come First, Music Comes Second, on 8 November 2014 at the Iceland Airwaves Festival in Reykjavík. The final performance was recorded and released as a concert film and a special edition vinyl set.

== Relationship with the media ==
The Knife rarely cooperated with the media or the mainstream music scene. Until 2005, they did not perform live concerts. The group rarely made public appearances; most of their promotional photos featured the members wearing masks with birds' beaks, similar to the traditional Venetian Medico Della Peste (plague doctor) masks worn during Carnival.

The Knife won the Swedish Grammis award for Pop Group of the Year in 2003, but they boycotted the ceremony by sending two representatives of the Guerrilla Girls, with the number 50 written on their costumes, as a protest against male dominance in the music industry. Their album Deep Cuts was also nominated for the best record of the year, although that award went to the Cardigans. At the Grammis awards in 2007, the Knife won in all six categories that they were nominated in: Composer of the Year, Music DVD of the Year, Producer of the Year, Pop Group of the Year, Album of the Year and Artist of the Year. Again, they did not attend the award ceremony. On another occasion, they did not come to collect the award but sent a manipulated video that muffled their voices and made them look very elderly.

Silent Shout was named the best album of 2006 by Pitchfork. The song "We Share Our Mothers' Health" from the album was made available for free as the iTunes Store's Single of the Week in late 2006.

== Influences ==
In a 2006 interview with Pitchfork, the Knife cited David Lynch, Aki Kaurismäki, Korean cinema, Trailer Park Boys, Donnie Darko and Doom as inspirations for their work. In addition, Karin named Sonic Youth, Kate Bush, Le Tigre and Siouxsie and the Banshees, while Olof cited techno, grime and Southern hip-hop.

== Solo projects ==
In 2008, Karin announced the release of a solo album under the name Fever Ray in March 2009. The eponymous album was digitally released in advance of this date. The single "If I Had a Heart" was featured in a 2011 episode of Breaking Bad and in the 2013 film Horns, is the opening theme of the Canadian-Irish historical drama television series Vikings, and is the opening of the movie Laurence Anyways by Canadian director Xavier Dolan, who also used Karin's song "Keep the Streets Empty For Me" in his movie Heartbeats. In a 2016 interview with The Fader, Karin related that they were at that moment working on more solo music, though they were "unsure" if it would be under the Fever Ray moniker or not. Their second solo album Plunge was released in 2017. A new album by Fever Ray, Radical Romantics, was released in the spring of 2023.

Olof performs as both DJ Coolof and Oni Ayhun.

== Discography ==
- The Knife (2001)
- Deep Cuts (2003)
- Silent Shout (2006)
- Tomorrow, in a Year (with Mt. Sims and Planningtorock) (2010)
- Shaking the Habitual (2013)

== Tours ==
The Knife initially did not play live shows, until 8 February 2005 when they played a show at the Institute of Contemporary Arts in London consisting of a screening of When I Found the Knife by Andreas Nilsson and performances of "Heartbeats", "You Take My Breath Away" and "You Make Me Like Charity".

- Silent Shout Tour
- Shaking the Habitual Tour

== Awards ==
Award	Year	Nominee(s)	Category	Result	Ref.
MTV Europe Music Awards	2006	The Knife	Best Swedish Act	Nominated	
mtvU Woodie Awards	2007	The Knife	Left Field Woodie	Nominated	

Year	Awards	Category
2003	Nöjesguiden's Stockholm Award	Music Category
2003	Swedish Hit Music Awards	Best Video for "Heartbeats"
2003	Swedish National Radio P3 Gold	Group of the Year
2003	Grammis	Pop Group of the Year
2004	Manifest Awards	Pop Rock
2004	Scandinavian Alternative Music Awards (SAMA)	Song of the Year for "Heartbeats"
2006	Pitchfork Media	Album of the Year
2006	Manifest Awards	Dance/House Techno of the Year
2006	Manifest Awards	Live Performers of the Year
2007	Swedish National Radio P3 Gold	Group of the Year
2007	Swedish National Radio P3 Gold	Dance of the Year
2007	Grammis	Artist of the Year
2007	Grammis	Pop Album of the Year for Silent Shout
2007	Grammis	Songwriters of the Year
2007	Grammis	Pop Producers of the Year
2007	Grammis	Music-DVD of the Year for Silent Shout: An Audiovisual Experience
2007	Grammis	Pop Group of the Year
2007	SAMA	Song of the Year for "Marble House"
2007	SAMA	Album of the Year for Silent Shout
2013	Nordic Music Prize	Best Nordic Album of the Year for Shaking the Habitual

== Television and film uses ==
The song "We Share Our Mothers' Health" was featured in the ABC series Ugly Betty, as well as an episode of CSI: NY. In August 2007, "Heartbeats" was featured in an episode of the HBO series Entourage, and was later used in an episode of the HBO series Girls. The song "Wrap Your Arms Around Me" was used in the closing scene and credits of the episode "The Bridge" in the 2017 first season of Hulu's The Handmaid's Tale.

Their song "Pass This On" was used in the 2010 drama film Heartbeats by Quebec director Xavier Dolan. "Pass This On" was also used in the 2011 drama Elles by Polish director Małgorzata Szumowska and in the 2013 thriller Magic Magic by Chilean director Sebastián Silva, which opens with Canadian actor Michael Cera singing along to the song. The documentary film The Jeffrey Dahmer Files (2012) used the song "Still Light" during the closing credits. The 2014 documentary Dior and I uses an instrumental of "Silent Shout" during an atelier montage sequence.

== See also ==
- Honey Is Cool
