= Reagan (EP) =

EP by Whirlwind Heat
- Released: April 10, 2006
- Genre: Alternative rock
- Label: Brille

Reagan EP is a single by Whirlwind Heat, released on April 10, 2006 by Brille.

== Track listing ==
1. Reagan
2. Memory
3. Macho Man
4. I Fucked Up Reagan
