= No Hope, No Future =

Studio album by Good Shoes
- Released: 25 January 2010
- Recorded: 2009
- Genre: Indie rock, indie pop
- Length: 30:57
- Label: Brille Records

Good Shoes chronology
Think Before You Speak (2007)	No Hope, No Future (2010)

No Hope, No Future is the second album by English indie rock band Good Shoes. It was released in January 2010.

== Reception ==
No Hope, No Future received "mixed or average reviews" according to review aggregator Metacritic based on 11 reviews.

Pitchfork's Marc Hogan stated it was "A darker album, a slightly clumsier album, but an album with a strong unifying themes and a few songs worth stepping away from the bar for." Heather Phares from AllMusic said "No Hope, No Future doesn't always play to the band's proven strengths, but it shows that Good Shoes are a thoroughly independent, even contrary band that's unafraid of change, even when it's difficult" Kelly Murray called of NME opined "Good Shoes offer little to get flustered over with this sometimes dire, but mostly mediocre second album" calling the album's title "prophetic".

Professional ratings
Aggregate scores
Source	Rating
Metacritic	60/100
Review scores
Source	Rating
AllMusic	3.5/5 stars
Drowned in Sound	6/10 stars
NME	5/10 stars
Pitchfork Media	(5.8/10)

== Track listing ==
No.	Title	Length
1.	"The Way My Heart Beats"	2:36
2.	"Everything You Do"	3:30
3.	"I Know"	3:24
4.	"Under Control"	2:30
5.	"Do You Remember"	3:02
6.	"Our Loving Mother In A Pink Diamond"	2:56
7.	"Times Change"	2:50
8.	"1000 Miles an Hour"	1:58
9.	"Then She Walks Away"	3:56
10.	"City By The Sea"	4:15
Total length:		30:57

Bonus Tracks Version
No.	Title	Length
11.	"Talk"	1:54
12.	"Stand By"	1:59
13.	"Run Away with Me"	2:57
14.	"Easier, Easier"	4:08
15.	"City by the Sea (Burberry Acoustic Version)"	5:00

== Personnel ==
- Rhys Jones – vocals, guitar
- Steve Leach – guitar
- Will Church – bass guitar
- Tom Jones – drums
