= Think Before You Speak (album) =

Studio album by Good Shoes
- Released: 26 March 2007
- Recorded: 2006
- Studio: Tambourine Studios (Malmö, Sweden)
- Genre: Indie rock, post-punk revival
- Length: 38:32
- Label: Brille Records
- Producer: Per Sunding

Good Shoes chronology
Think Before You Speak (2007)	No Hope, No Future (2010)

Professional ratings
Review scores
Source	Rating
AllMusic	4/5 stars
Drowned in Sound	7/10 stars
NME	8/10 stars
Pitchfork Media	(7.2/10)
Playlouder	(8.0/10)

Think Before You Speak is the debut album by English indie rock band Good Shoes, which was released on 26 March 2007 on Brille Records. The album was recorded in nineteen days in Malmö in Sweden by Per Sunding at Tambourine Studios.

== Track listing ==
1. "Nazanin" – 2:06
2. "The Photos on My Wall" – 1:52
3. "Morden" – 2:29
4. "All in My Head" – 2:32
5. "Never Meant to Hurt You" – 3:31
6. "Blue Eyes" – 3:33
7. "Sophia" – 3:12
8. "We Are Not the Same" – 2:43
9. "Small Town Girl" – 3:39
10. "In the City" – 2:37
11. "Things to Make and Do" – 2:45
12. "Everybody's Talking" – 1:47
13. "Ice Age" – 2:53
14. "Wait" – 2:53

== Personnel ==
- Rhys Jones – vocals, guitar
- Steve Leach – guitar
- Joel Cox – bass guitar
- Tom Jones – drums
