= Artpop =

2013 studio album by Lady Gaga

Studio album by Lady Gaga
- Released: November 6, 2013
- Recorded: 2012–2013
- Genres: EDM; synth-pop
- Length: 59:04
- Labels: Streamline; Interscope
- Producers: Lady Gaga; Paul "DJ White Shadow" Blair; Zedd; Madeon; Rick Rubin; Giorgio Tuinfort; Infected Mushroom; will.i.am; David Guetta

Lady Gaga chronology
A Very Gaga Holiday (2011)	Artpop (2013)	Cheek to Cheek (2014)

Singles from Artpop
- 1. "Applause" Released: August 12, 2013; 2. "Do What U Want" Released: October 21, 2013; 3. "G.U.Y." Released: March 22, 2014

Artpop (stylized in all caps) is the third studio album by the American singer Lady Gaga. (Note: Occasionally, Gaga's debut album The Fame (2008) and its reissue The Fame Monster (2009) are counted separately, which would make Artpop her fourth studio album.) It was released on November 6, 2013, by Streamline and Interscope Records. Gaga began planning the project in 2011, shortly after the launch of her second album, Born This Way. Work continued until 2013 while Gaga was traveling for her Born This Way Ball tour and recovering from surgery for an injury she had sustained while touring. Gaga described Artpop as "a celebration and a poetic musical journey". She contrasted the album with Born This Way, saying that while the earlier record reflected maturity, Artpop would intentionally take a more playful and uninhibited approach.

Gaga collaborated with various producers on the record, including DJ White Shadow, Zedd, and Madeon. Musically, Artpop is an EDM and synth-pop album, with influences from R&B, techno, industrial, and dubstep, among other genres. The themes of the album revolve around Gaga's personal views of fame, sex, and self-empowerment; references include Greek and Roman mythology. It also features guest vocals from T.I., Too Short, Twista, and R. Kelly. On January 10, 2019, as a reaction to the documentary Surviving R. Kelly, Kelly's featured song, "Do What U Want", was removed from all streaming and online versions, as well as new vinyl and CD pressings of the album.

The release of Artpop was preceded by a two-day album release party dubbed ArtRave. While the album received generally mixed reviews from music critics, it was included in multiple year-end lists and has since earned positive retrospective reviews from critics and publications. It topped the charts in Austria, Croatia, Japan, Mexico, Scotland, the United Kingdom, and the United States, while charting within the top five in Australia, Belgium, Canada, China, Denmark, Finland, France, Germany, Greece, Ireland, Italy, the Netherlands, New Zealand, Norway, Portugal, South Korea, Spain, and Switzerland. According to the International Federation of the Phonographic Industry (IFPI), Artpop was the ninth-best-selling album globally of 2013, with 2.3 million copies worldwide.

"Applause" was released as the lead single from Artpop on August 12, 2013. It was a critical and commercial success, charting within the top ten in more than 20 countries worldwide and peaking at number four on the Billboard Hot 100 chart in the United States. The second single, "Do What U Want", was released on October 21 and reached number 13 in the US. It was followed by the promotional singles "Venus" and "Dope" shortly before the album's release. "G.U.Y." was the third and final single released from the album. Gaga promoted Artpop with various television appearances and performances, including her second Thanksgiving Day special. After a short residency at Roseland Ballroom, she embarked on her fourth headlining concert tour, ArtRave: The Artpop Ball.

== Background ==
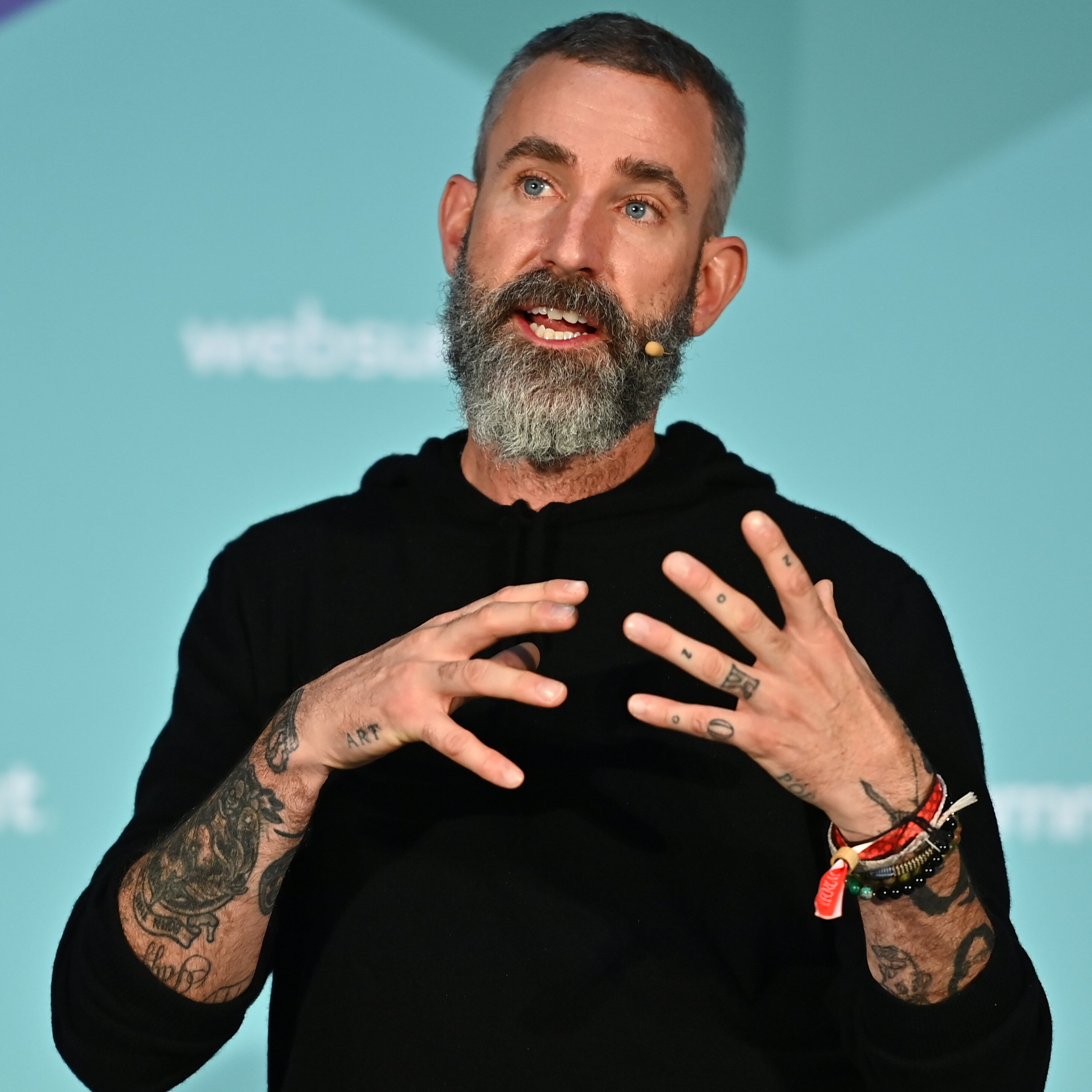
After Born This Way, Gaga again worked with DJ White Shadow on Artpop.

Development of Artpop began shortly after the release of Lady Gaga's second studio album, Born This Way (2011), and later that year, its concepts were "beginning to flourish" as Gaga collaborated with producers Fernando Garibay and DJ White Shadow. By May 2012, Gaga was working on new material while touring with the Born This Way Ball, with co-manager Vincent Herbert saying that they were "doing it on the road" and promising "insane, great records". By December, Gaga said that she had written around 50 songs for the album, though she had not yet determined which would be included. Gaga wanted audiences to have "a really good time" with Artpop and conceived the album to evoke "a night at the club", with its songs flowing together in a way that she felt suited listening with friends from beginning to end. Meanwhile, Gaga began presenting tracks to her record company and hoped to reveal the album's working title by September, a title that was instead announced a month in advance.

Gaga recruited Jeff Koons into the project in early 2013; the two had previously met at a Metropolitan Museum of Art fashion event three years earlier, where Gaga provided a live performance. According to Koons, she "just kind of grabbed ahold of me and gave me a big hug around my waist" and replied, "You know, Jeff, I've been such a fan of yours, and when I was a kid just hanging out in Central Park I would talk to my friends about your work." Following her hip surgery in February 2013, Gaga was forced into a six-month hiatus, during which she studied literature and music with her creative team, the Haus of Gaga, and shared "creative gifts". This stage allowed her to review and enhance her creative direction, which she described as a meticulous "gazing process". She explained, "I have to gaze into the work for long periods of time for it to be good," adding that upon analyzing her ideas, she received "that wonderful feeling" that told her "that's the one".

== Conception ==
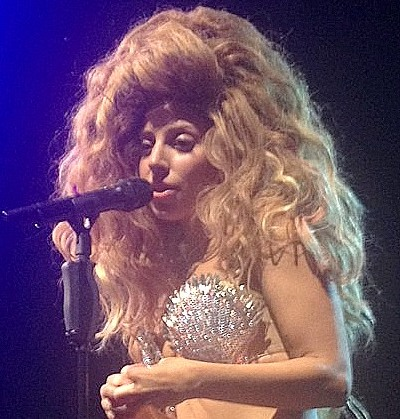
Sandro Botticelli's The Birth of Venus (pictured left) is the background of the album's cover artwork. It also influenced Gaga's image during promotional events, including her 2013 iTunes Festival performance (right).

Gaga described Artpop as "a celebration and a poetic musical journey". She contrasted the album with Born This Way, which she felt demonstrated "a sense of maturity", saying its follow-up would display "a tremendous lack of maturity or sense of responsibility". In an August 2013 interview, she told V magazine that she underwent a "cosmetic experience with words" as she examined potential names for the project. "Popart" was initially favored, but as Gaga questioned "the cultural implication of the words" and the title's evolution post-release, she soon found a "nice ring" to "Artpop".

Gaga said that at the height of the Born This Way era, she had become increasingly self-conscious about her public image. Explaining the concept behind Artpop, she imagined standing before a mirror and removing the wigs, makeup, and elaborate costumes associated with her persona. She wanted to prove she could be artistically "brilliant" without them and to challenge herself to innovate from within. Gaga sought to convey vulnerability through the cover artwork for "Applause", selecting a photograph that she believed revealed a side of her performance the public rarely saw. Sandro Botticelli's painting The Birth of Venus (c. 1484–1486) was incorporated into Artpop's cover artwork and influenced Gaga's visual presentation during the era, including the music video for "Applause" and live performances such as those at the 2013 MTV Video Music Awards and iTunes Festival.

The album's themes primarily revolve around fame, sex, and empowerment, while briefly exploring gender roles and marijuana. References include Greek and Roman mythology, as well as the classic jazz and electronic musician Sun Ra. Spencer Kornhaber from The Atlantic saw Artpop as an "attention-freak's manifesto" and interpreted the record's exploration of carnal desire as a facet of the broader idea of "owning up to one's own desire for attention". John Aizlewood of the London Evening Standard suggested that songs such as "Do What U Want" and "Dope" highlighted Gaga's "curiously submissive" tendencies as a lyricist. Jason Lipshutz from Billboard commented that Artpop "naturally abides" to her "far-reaching ambition" to "re-think the 'pop album' as an entity", while Jerry Shriver of USA Today observed that the lyrics foretold "the exploits of an empowered, sexy siren who wrestles with fame", something he expected from Gaga. Jon Pareles of The New York Times argued that, with Artpop, Gaga reasserted "her need for the love of her audience and announced her new pivot to align herself with the [visual] art world".

== Recording ==
=== Production ===
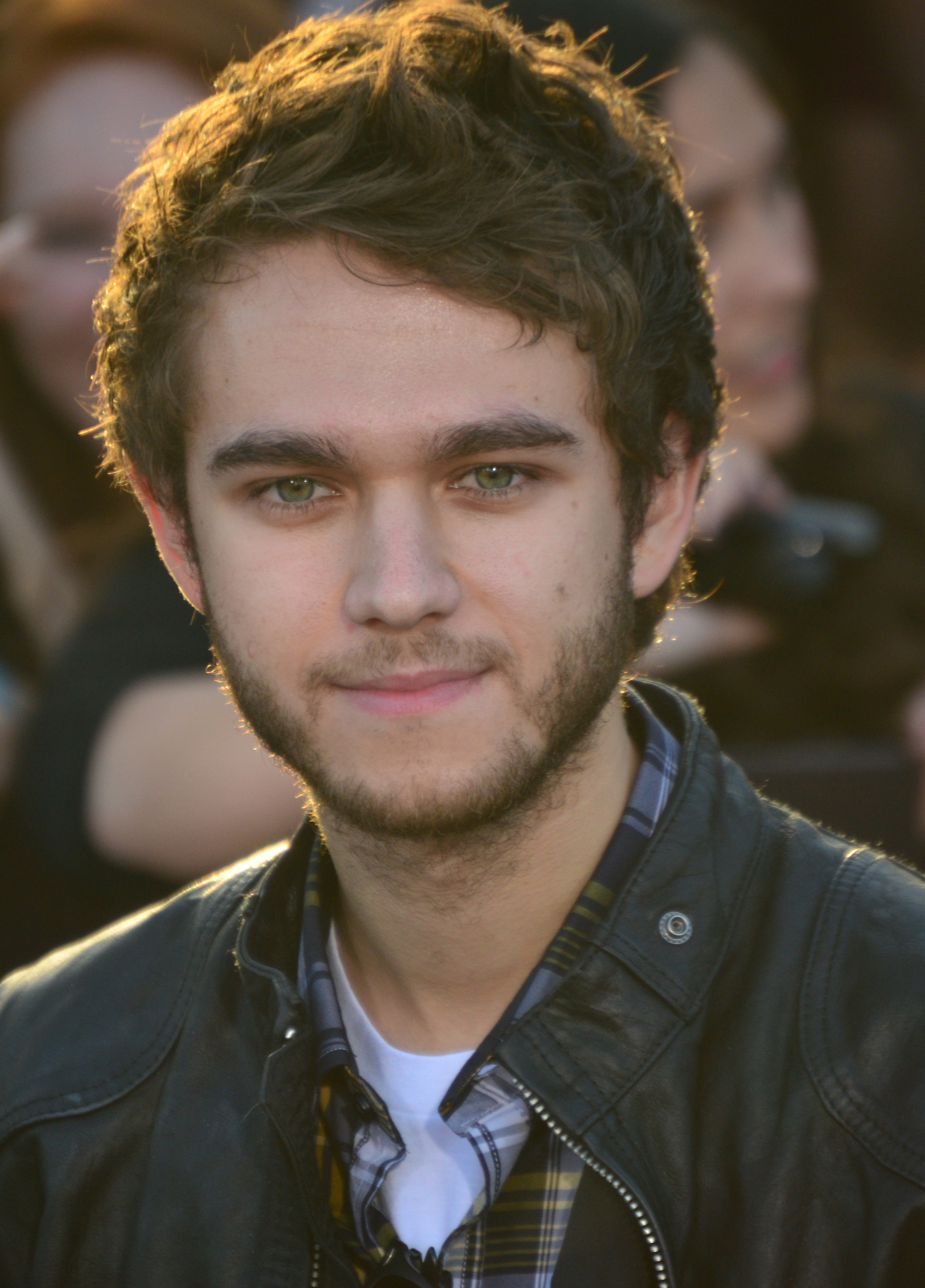
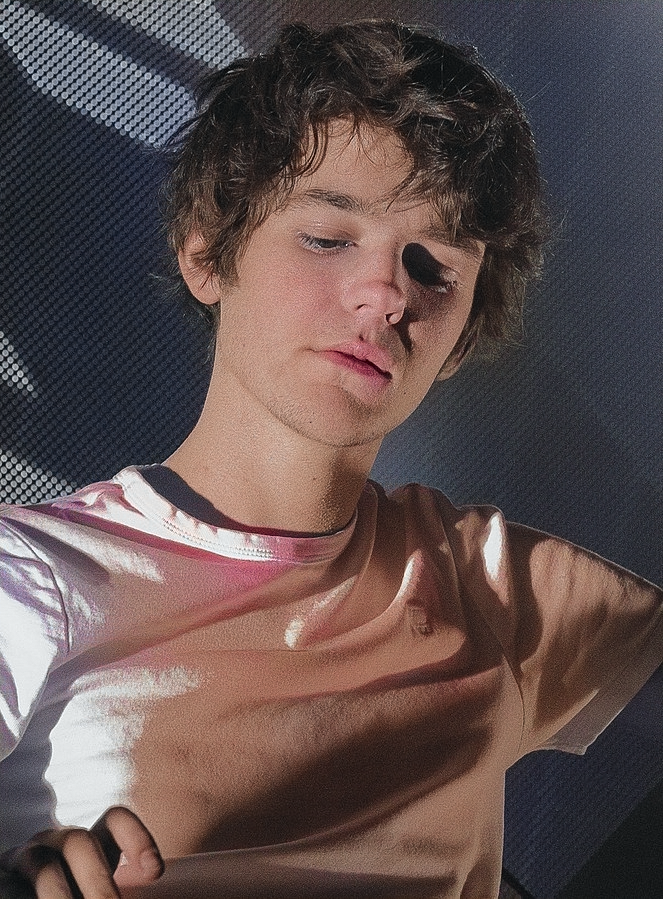
Zedd and Madeon (pictured left to right) were some of the major production contributors on the album.

Gaga composed and produced all the songs on the album, collaborating with producers including DJ White Shadow, Zedd, and Madeon. White Shadow recalled that Gaga had contacted him less than a week after Born This Way was released. She already "had the name and the general concept for the record", he told MTV. White Shadow told Rolling Stone that they aimed to challenge listeners' expectations and exploring ideas outside conventional pop music. Many songs were written during the Born This Way Ball tour, with several tracks being worked on simultaneously until the deadline for submitting the album to Interscope.

According to Zedd, Gaga gave him the freedom to try different ideas without worrying about whether the songs would work on the radio. They were not specifically trying to make an electronic dance music (EDM) album, although they did not avoid the genre either. For one track, Gaga gave him a list of words describing an emotion and asked him to express it through music. Zedd said they often struggled to find time to work together because of their touring schedules.

Working with Gaga was Madeon's first experience collaborating face-to-face with a singer. He had long wanted to work with pop artists, and Gaga was his first choice. Gaga praised his musical knowledge and enthusiasm despite his young age. Madeon later recalled her heading straight to the studio after performing three-hour concerts on the Born This Way Ball tour. Artpop also brought Gaga together with will.i.am for the first time, on "Fashion!". Although they had discussed collaborating for years, Gaga said they were both "picky" and had waited for the right song and musical style.

=== Featured artists ===
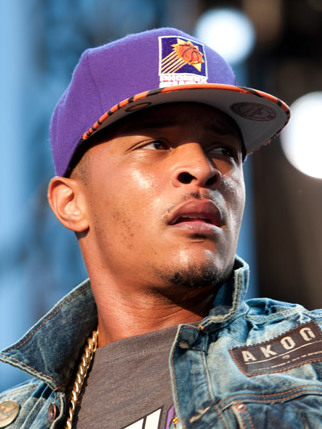
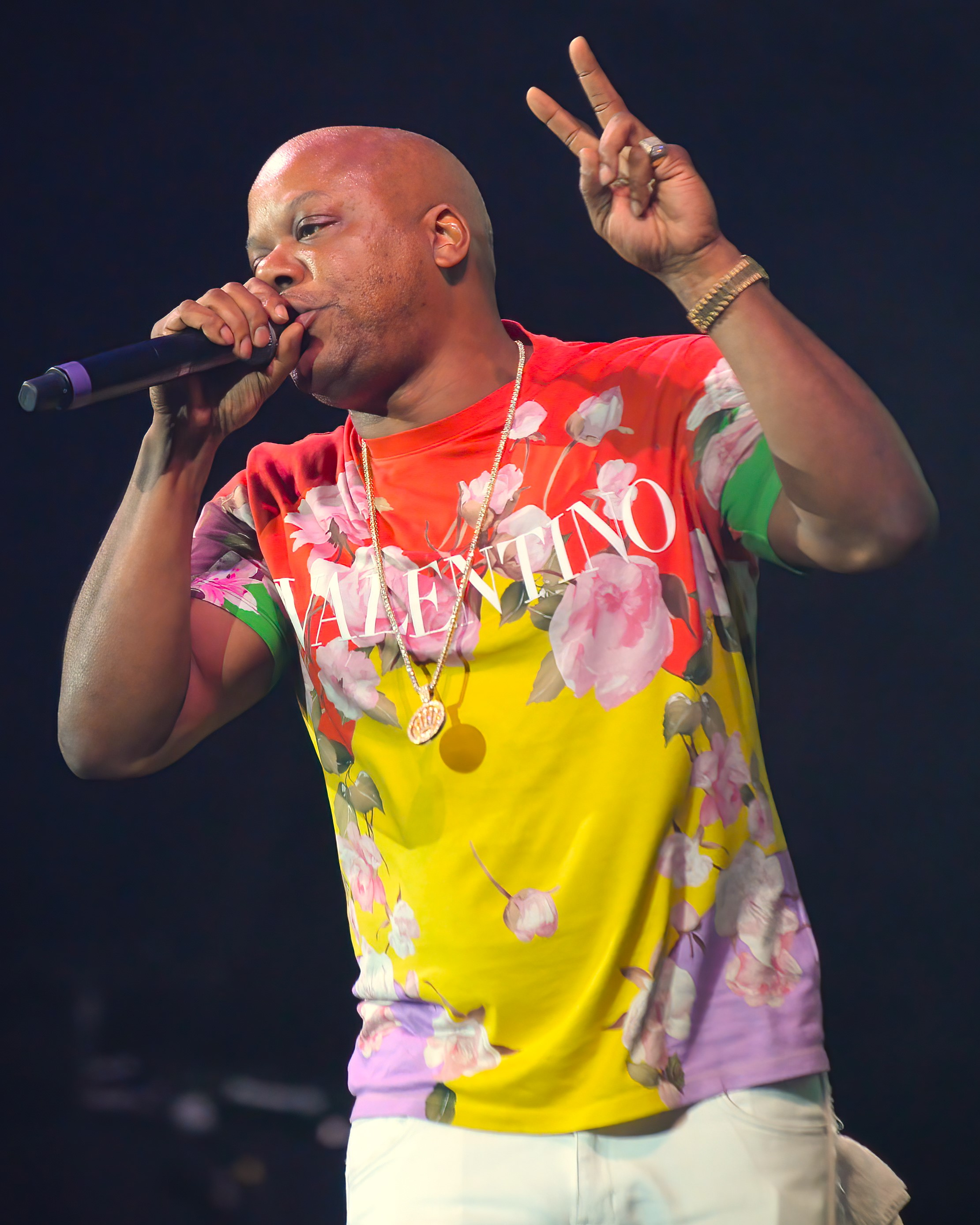
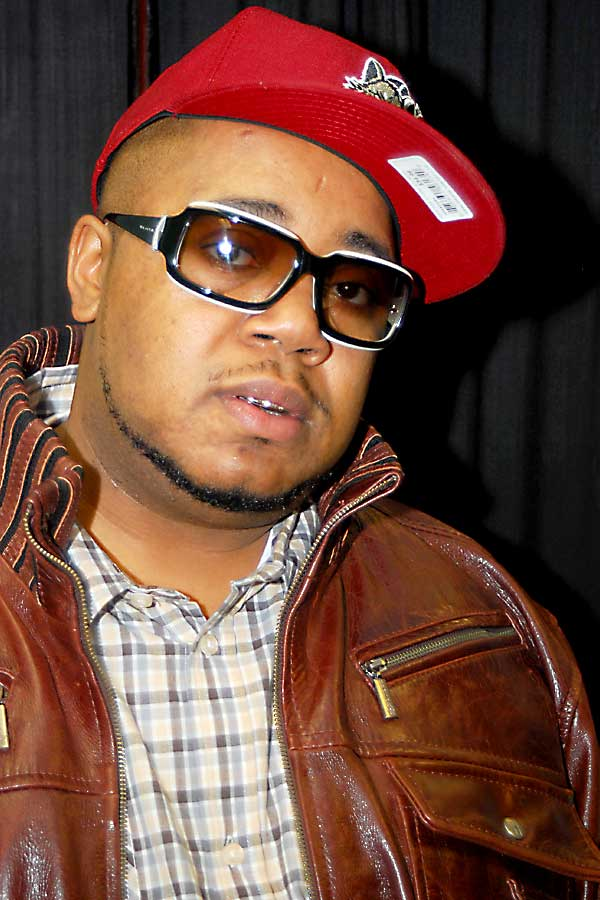
The track "Jewels n' Drugs" features T.I., Too Short, and Twista (pictured left to right).

In mid-2013, Gaga contacted rappers T.I., Too Short, and Twista to record a song, later revealed as "Jewels n' Drugs". Too Short said that he became involved after producer DJ White Shadow suggested him for the track, and he subsequently recorded his verse in Los Angeles. In an interview with MTV News, T.I. and Twista confirmed that they had recorded their contributions separately. Twista said Gaga wanted to bring together some artists with different styles to capture the atmosphere she envisioned for the song. Gaga also worked with rapper Azealia Banks on two songs titled "Red Flame" and "Ratchet", though the tracks remained unreleased as their collaboration ended in a dispute.

DJ White Shadow told the Chicago Tribune that while he was working on "Do What U Want" with Gaga during the European leg of the Born This Way Ball tour, he suggested bringing R. Kelly onto the track. He said it "seemed logical" to pair "two writing/singing geniuses". Kelly later told Billboard that he enjoyed recording the song and praised Gaga's professionalism. At a press conference in Japan in 2013, when Gaga was asked why she worked with Kelly, she defended the collaboration, saying that both she and Kelly had experienced false media coverage and that this created a sense of connection between them. Following the broadcast of the documentary Surviving R. Kelly in January 2019, which detailed sexual abuse allegations against Kelly, Gaga apologized for working with him, stating that her thinking at the time had been "explicitly twisted" and that she had exercised "poor judgement". The song was subsequently removed from all digital versions of Artpop, as well as later vinyl and CD pressings of the album.

== Composition ==
=== Music ===
Critics have described Artpop as an EDM and synth-pop album. Vulture further characterised it as "coherently channeling R&B, techno, disco, and rock music". Its electronic landscape was initially tailored for Born This Way before Gaga and Fernando Garibay opted for a rock-influenced sound. Sal Cinquemani of Slant Magazine stated that Gaga "continues to be a student" of Madonna, noting influences from Madonna's catalogue, including "Holiday", "Material Girl", and Confessions on a Dance Floor. He also argued that much of Artpop revisited familiar musical territory from Gaga's earlier career. Adam Markovitz, writing for Entertainment Weekly, echoed this thought, writing that "most of the songs here would fit right in" with The Fame (2008) and Born This Way. Mof Gimmers of The Quietus noticed a "tremendous juggernaut of pop" within the album's frame, while Helen Brown, writing for The Daily Telegraph, quipped "it's like wandering drunk around a vast, labyrinthine club, and peering into a disorienting series of darkened rooms in which she tries on various musical genres as if they were hats" in reference to the album's busy soundscape. Ben Kelly from Attitude viewed Artpop as a "relentless odyssey of electronic sounds" pierced by "strong melodic refrains". John Aizlewood, writing for London Evening Standard, said it was built to inspire "hair-waving, body-shaking routines at stadium shows", pinpointing "stentorian keyboards, clattering electro-percussion and thumping backbeats" as the bedrock of the album's production.

=== Songs ===
Major musical influences on Artpop

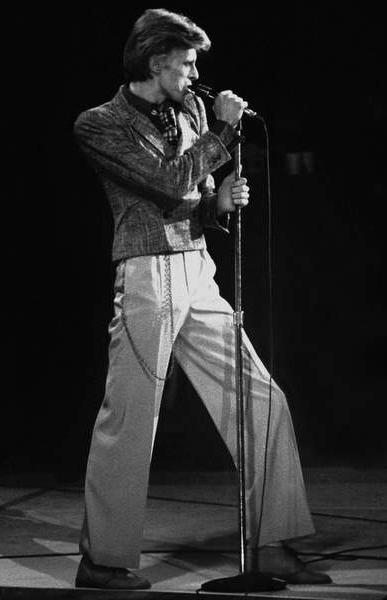
Gaga's vocal delivery and lyrics in "Venus" and "Fashion!" were likened to the work of David Bowie (pictured in 1974).

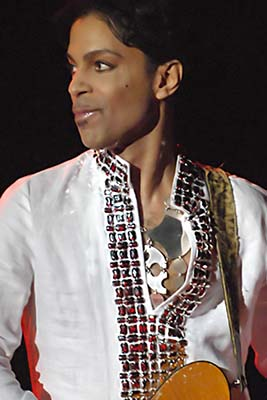
"Sexxx Dreams" drew comparisons to the music of Prince (pictured in 2008).

The album begins with "Aura", a mariachi and EDM song that is influenced by dubstep and Middle Eastern music. It opens with Western-style guitars, Gaga's distorted vocals, and a "maniacal laugh". Throbbing beats lead to the chorus, in which Gaga asks, "Do you wanna see the girl who lives behind the aura, behind the aura?" She explained that in the song she expresses that just because she wears a lot of "visual fashion", "[it] doesn't mean that there is not sort of the same person underneath." These "veils" are protecting her creativity, and her "Aura" is the way that she deals with her "insanity". The album continues with "Venus", a track that shows "retro-futuristic themes" and presents Bowie-esque lyrics about a psychedelic journey. It mentions Venus, the Roman goddess of love, the eponymous planet, and sexual intercourse. It is a synth-pop and dance-pop song. Gaga said the lyrics are "about finding faith in other places, in the beyond", and also "about sex in the most mythological way."

"G.U.Y." (an acronym for "Girl Under You") is an EDM song with industrial, R&B, and house elements, which was described as a "shuddering dance siren that makes the distinction between gender equality and willful sexual submission". Gaga explained that "G.U.Y." explores her interpretation of third-wave feminism, in which she found strength in taking a submissive role with a man. "Sexxx Dreams" is a synth-pop song, with production inspired by Prince and Vanity 6. Its lyrics propose a sexual encounter with a lover whose boyfriend is gone for the weekend. Throughout the song, Gaga alternates her vocal techniques between singing and speaking; the sung verses are addressed to her partner at her side, and the spoken ones to the person in her fantasy. The fifth track on the album is "Jewels n' Drugs", a hip hop song with strong influences of trap music that explores addiction to fame. The lyrics are an "ode to the love of the drug trade" and they are of the "classic rap style".

The next song, "Manicure" (stylized as "MANiCURE") includes handclapping and Gaga shouting, "Man! Cure!" and funk guitar arrangements. Its ambiguous lyrics celebrate superficial pleasures and talk about physically and spiritually renewing oneself before "getting ready to go out and catch a man or catch a girl". The song is more rock-oriented than the preceding tracks, while retaining a pop sound. "Do What U Want" is an electropop and R&B track featuring throbbing, 1980s-inspired synthesizers. It features a somewhat sexually suggestive hook. Gaga explained that the song reflected her feelings about sexuality, while its lyrics also address media scrutiny, asserting that although the public could scrutinize her body, her thoughts and identity remained her own.

The album's title track is a techno song that has a beat similar to Selena Gomez's 2011 single "Love You like a Love Song" with its electronic composition, and a groove comparable to singer Kylie Minogue's 2001 hit single "Can't Get You Out of My Head". The lyrics to "Artpop" have been interpreted as Gaga's virtual manifesto, with the line "My artpop could mean anything" reflecting her refusal to align herself with a single viewpoint, as well as her identity as "an artist that creates for the sake of creation". Gaga explained that the lyrics were a metaphor about love with the chorus line "We could belong together, Artpop." She believed that if her fans and she could be together, that would probably mean a bonding for art and pop too. "Swine" is a dubstep and industrial song. It contains Gaga "screaming and squealing throughout the track." She called the song "very personal", as it is about "some of the more troubling and challenging sexual experiences" from earlier in her life, alluding to her rape at age 19 by a producer 20 years her senior.

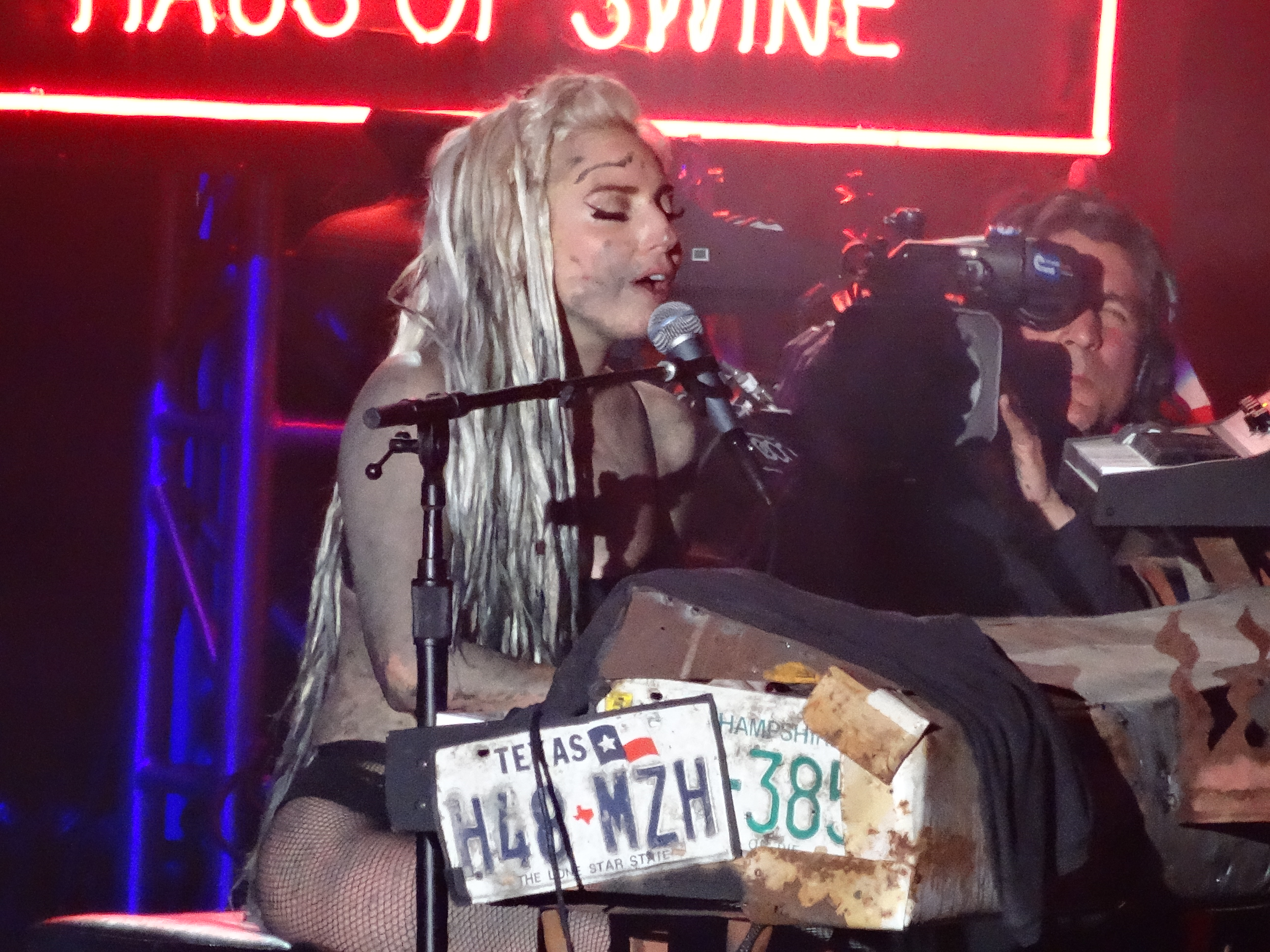
Gaga performing "Dope" at SXSW. The song talks about her past experiences with substance abuse.

The tenth song is "Donatella", an "anthem for the outcasts" and a tribute to her friend Donatella Versace, the head of the Versace fashion house. Gaga described it as "an incredible crazy fun pop song with really raising electronic beats" about being a fearless woman who is proud of herself. "Fashion!" is a dance song with Daft Punk-influenced instrumentals that portrays Gaga's love for haute couture clothing. Accompanied by a funky beat, the lyrics talk about "being able to get dressed up and feeling like you own the world". Gaga's vocal delivery in the song has been compared to David Bowie's. "Mary Jane Holland" is a dance and synth-pop song that features whirring electronic beats and discusses using marijuana while going out and having a great time. Gaga used the name Mary Jane Holland as an alter ego for herself when she got "stoned" in Amsterdam with a friend of hers. She explained that smoking marijuana helped her escape the pressures of fame and do whatever she wanted. "Dope" is an electronic rock lament where Gaga's singing is the focal point of the song, with only piano sounds and distant synths accompanying her "intoxicated", "slur"-like vocals. To give the production an intimate feeling and make it emotional, no pitch correction was used for Gaga's voice. According to Gaga, the track is the "sad part" of the story of "Mary Jane Holland". It is about how she developed an addiction to marijuana, using it as a coping mechanism for anxiety, which eventually made her feel more "paranoid" and less "articulate". Gaga intended the song to be an apology to everybody who dealt with her during this period.

"Gypsy" is a Europop and electropop song with classic rock and house influences that contains "barroom ivory-tickling" and a "swooping hook". The composition is in a sing-along style, with Gaga belting out "I don't wanna be alone forever, but I can be tonight" during the chorus, talking about navigating an unknown road based only on her instincts. Gaga described the song as being about travelling the world and the loneliness associated with it. The song showcases Gaga's fans as being the people with whom she feels at home, therefore not feeling alone whenever she is in a different country. The lyrics also talk about falling in love while being true to oneself, which was the initial inspiration for the track. Artpop's last song is "Applause", which spans genres such as electropop and Eurodance. It opens with distorted synthesizer sounds and a choppy beat, recalling the sound of Gaga's debut album, The Fame. Discussing the lyrics, Gaga explained that she valued applause as appreciation for her performances, rather than the attention she received simply for being famous. Gaga also takes shots at those who attempt to analyze her work with the line, "I stand here waiting for you to bang the gong/ To crash the critic saying, 'Is it right or is it wrong?'".

== Release ==
=== Announcements ===
In August 2012, after getting a matching tattoo, Gaga announced on her social media that the record would be titled Artpop, stating she preferred it capitalized. The album was initially expected to be released in early 2013. However, Gaga subsequently underwent hip surgery after developing synovitis and a labral tear, forcing the cancellation of the remaining dates of the Born This Way Ball. In July 2013, she announced that Artpop would be released on November 11, 2013, in the United States. Album pre-orders were initially scheduled for September 1, but were moved to August 19 due to public demand, and ultimately made available on August 12 alongside the early release of "Applause". The track listing was unveiled on October 9, 2013, through photographs retweeted by Gaga of a mural created by her fans in Los Angeles. Gaga explained that the track listing had been delayed because two songs were competing for the twelfth position on the album.

=== Artwork ===
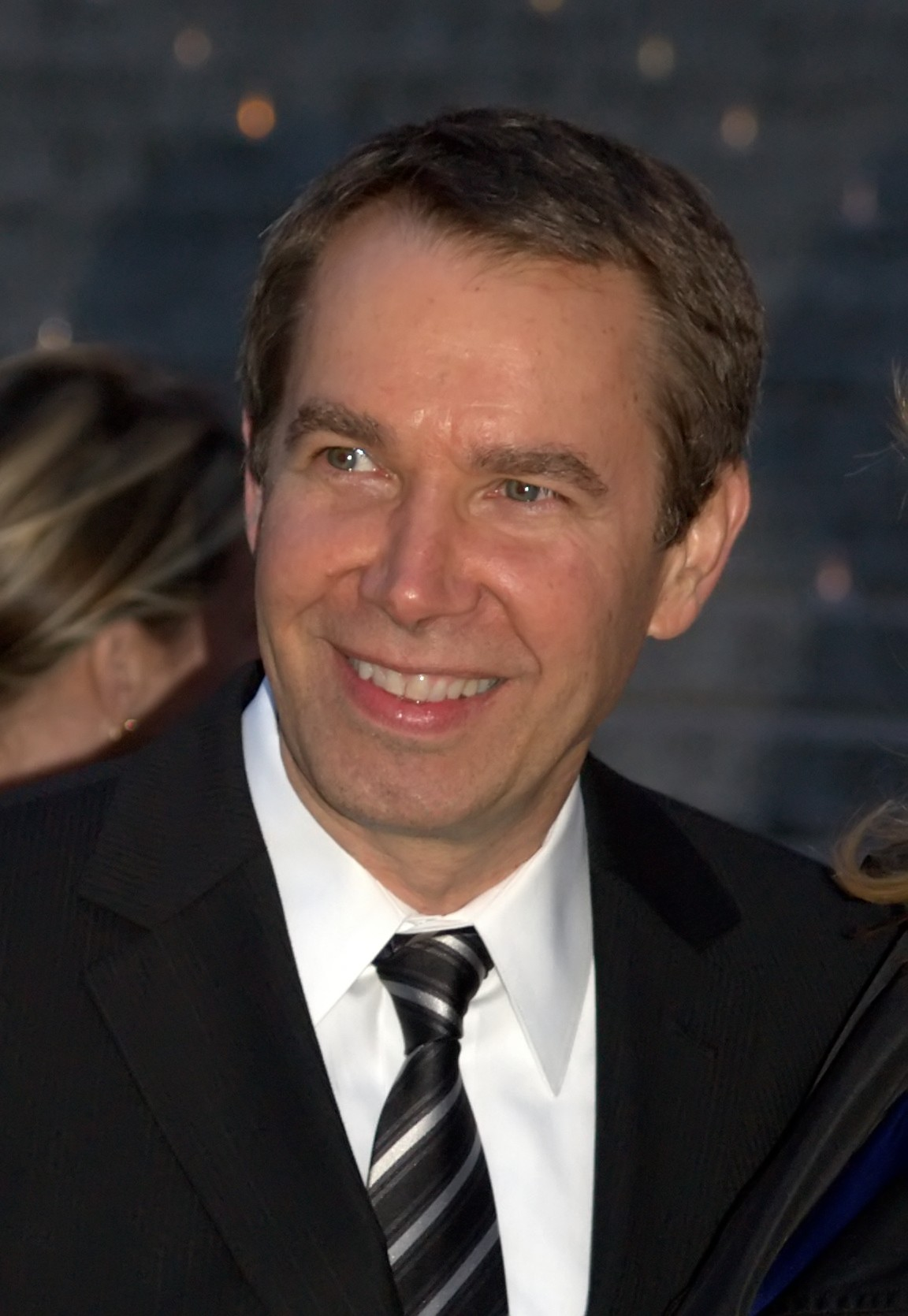
American artist Jeff Koons (pictured in 2009) designed the cover artwork for Artpop.

On October 7, 2013, Gaga unveiled the album cover for Artpop on Clear Channel billboards around the world. Created by Jeff Koons, the image features a nude sculpture of Gaga with a blue gazing ball placed in front of her, set against a collage of classical artworks. Koons explained that he wanted to depict Gaga as a sculptural, three-dimensional figure accompanied by a gazing ball, a recurring motif in his work intended to evoke reflection and the viewer's presence. The background contains fragments of Gian Lorenzo Bernini's Apollo and Daphne, referencing the myth in which Daphne transforms into a tree while being pursued by Apollo. Koons noted that Apollo, as the god of music, symbolized transformation through artistic expression. Botticelli's The Birth of Venus was also incorporated, presenting Gaga in the role of Venus and representing beauty, creativity, and the pursuit of aesthetic transcendence. Koons enlisted Japanese psychology professor and artist Akiyoshi Kitaoka to create optical illusions for the CD interior, including a version of his "Hatpin urchin" illusion printed on the disc itself.

Will Gompertz of NME described the cover as "a classic", praising both its typography and visual presentation, and adding, "When you're listing the 100 best covers of the 21st century, this will be right up there." Later, Gaga announced that the first 500,000 physical copies of Artpop would feature her name in hot pink metallic foil and the album title in silver foil, reflecting Koons's original design, for which he had hand-collaged the typography.

In January 2014, China's Ministry of Culture approved the release of all 15 tracks from Artpop, after six of Gaga's songs were included on a government blacklist in 2011 for allegedly vulgar content. For the Chinese edition, the cover art was modified: Gaga's legs were covered with black stockings, and the blue gazing ball was enlarged to conceal her breasts.

=== Mobile app ===
In addition to traditional CD and digital formats, Gaga announced plans for a multimedia app that "combines music, art, fashion and technology with a new interactive worldwide community". She expressed her goal to "bring ARTculture into POP in a reverse Warholian expedition." According to Gaga's announcement, the app was developed by TechHaus, the technology division of her creative team, the Haus of Gaga. It was compatible for both Android and iOS devices. The app followed earlier experiments with album-based apps, including Björk's Biophilia (2011) and Jay-Z's Magna Carta Holy Grail (2013). Relative Wave, which had previously contributed to Björk's Biophilia app, also worked on the development of the Artpop app, a process that took more than a year. Released as a free download on November 11, 2013, the app featured a virtual guide named Petga, which generated personalized "auras" based on users' interests. Its main features included an interactive turntable for playing the album and ArtHaus, which allowed users to create, remix, and share animated GIFs. Two additional features, Trakstar and GagaTV, were unavailable at launch. Gaga explained that Trakstar would allow users to create music using the album's audio stems, while GagaTV was intended to feature performances and new songs.

Some dismissed the project as an elaborate ploy to inflate album sales, under the assumption Billboard would count a downloaded track as a complete unit. Bill Werde, Billboard's editorial director, addressed these concerns in July 2013. He explained that the Artpop app would be free and fans could purchase the album through it; such purchases would count toward Billboard charts because they were processed by existing digital retailers. He also clarified that buying a single track through the app would not count as an album sale. He noted that the model differed from the Samsung-sponsored release of Magna Carta Holy Grail, which distributed the album for free via an app. Gaga also planned to release additional music through the app, including collaborations that did not make the album's final track listing. She specifically announced plans to release "Brooklyn Nights", which she had excluded from Artpop because she "wanted to spend more time" on it, during the album's promotional cycle. However, the song was never officially released. The app was removed from the App Store in 2015.

== Promotion ==
=== Singles ===
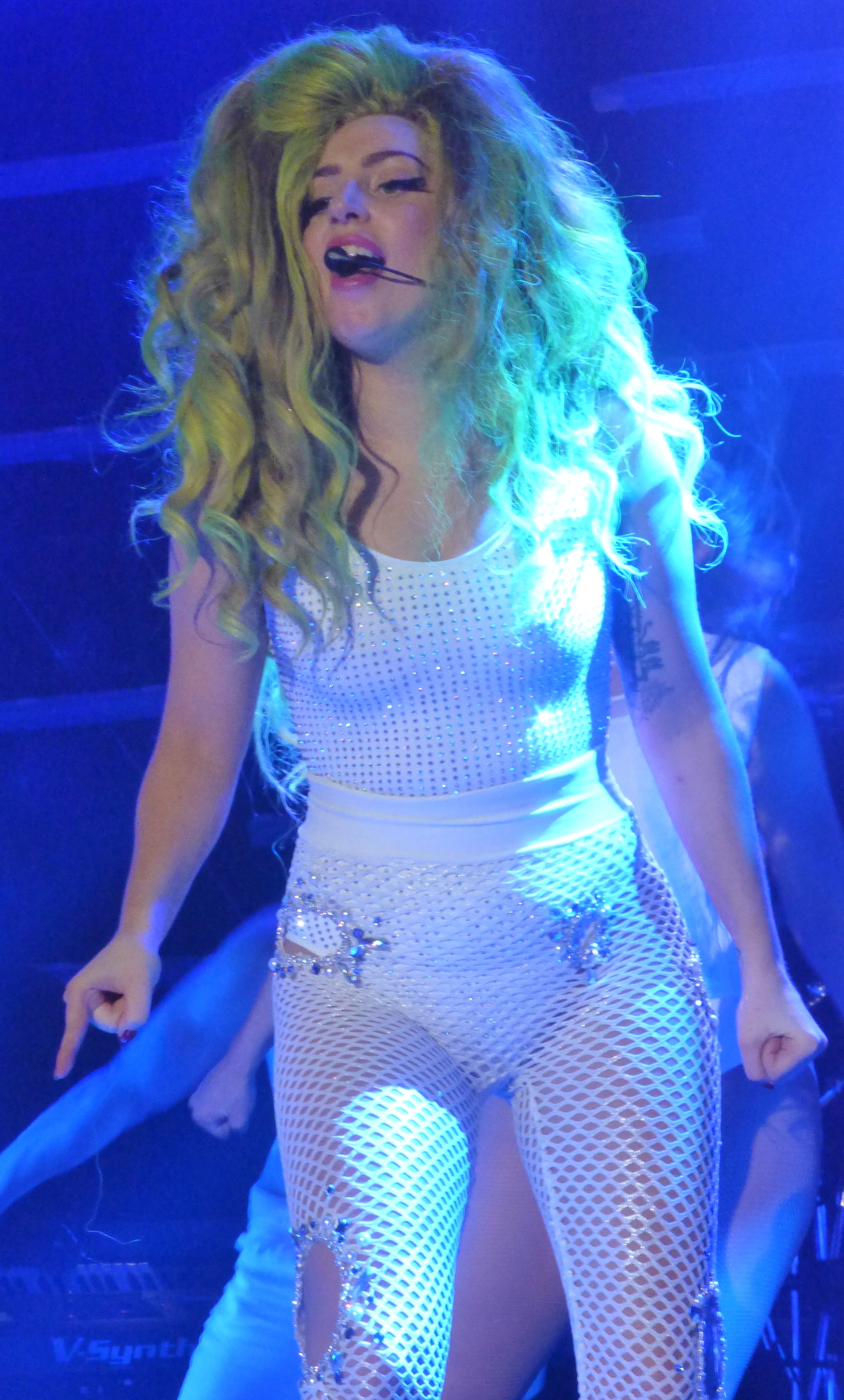
Gaga performing "G.U.Y." during her residency show at Roseland Ballroom (2014)

"Applause" was released as the lead single on August 12, 2013, ahead of schedule due to multiple leaks, and was sent to US radio stations the same day. It received favorable reviews from music critics, and charted in the top ten in a number of nations, peaking at number four in the United States. An accompanying music video to "Applause" was premiered and broadcast on jumbotrons across Times Square after her interview on Good Morning America on August 19, 2013. It was shot in Los Angeles by Dutch photographer duo Inez van Lamsweerde and Vinoodh Matadin. It features Gaga in scenes such as being in a birdcage, transforming into a black swan–human hybrid, and dancing in a black-glove bra. Critics reviewed the video positively, noting it was in "typical Gaga fashion", and noted references to German Expressionist cinema and Andy Warhol.

On September 3, 2013, Gaga started polls on Twitter asking fans to help her choose the second single from Artpop, listing "Manicure", "Sexxx Dreams", "Aura", and "Swine" as options. Gaga revealed the next month that "Venus" had been selected as the second single, though the popularity of the planned promotional single "Do What U Want" led to its single release instead. It received a generally positive response from reviewers, who complimented its chorus and found it a potential radio hit. The song peaked within the top 10 in some countries, including the United Kingdom, Italy, and South Korea, as well as the top 20 in other nations, including Germany, Sweden, and the United States. An alternate studio version of "Do What U Want", in which Kelly's original vocals are replaced with new verses sung by Christina Aguilera, was released on January 1, 2014. Two promotional singles were made available from Artpop preceding the album's release: "Venus" on October 28, 2013, and "Dope" on November 4, 2013. The latter reached a top 10 position on the Billboard Hot 100 and in some European countries, becoming her highest-charting promotional single to date.

"G.U.Y.", the third and final single release, impacted mainstream radio stations in the United States on April 8, 2014. It had a mixed reception from music critics; some found it catchy and one of the standout tracks from Artpop, while others criticized its production and the lyrics. The song debuted on the record charts of a few countries but failed to enter the top ten in most of them. It was accompanied by a music video, shot at Hearst Castle and directed by Gaga, which also incorporated parts of the tracks "Artpop", "Venus", and "Manicure" in addition to "G.U.Y.". The video shows Gaga as a wounded fallen angel who, after being revived by her followers in a pool, takes revenge on the men who hunted her. Critics noted the video's "heavy dose of camp and pop culture" and references to Greek mythology.

=== Live performances and other gigs ===
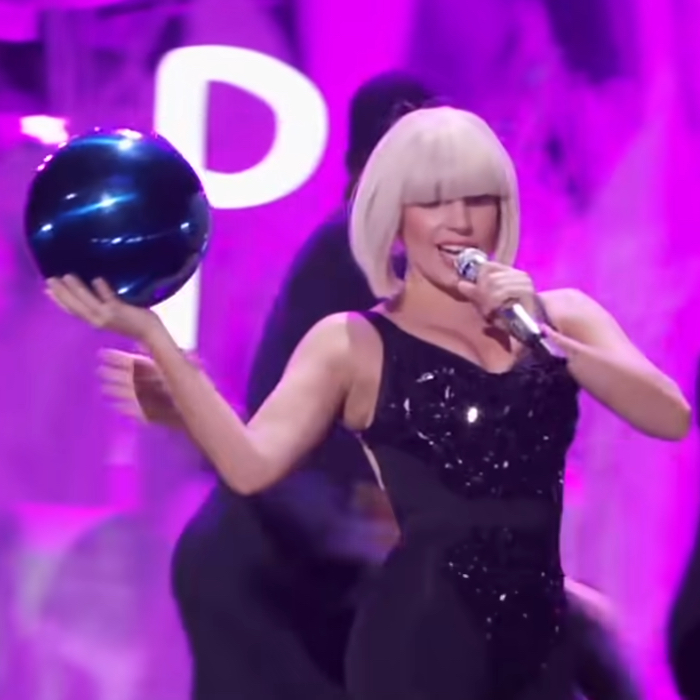
Gaga performing "Applause" at the 2013 MTV Video Music Awards, while holding a Gazing Ball by Koons

On December 25, 2012, Gaga announced a documentary celebrating "life, the creation of Artpop + you", which she described as a gift to her fans. The documentary was directed by Terry Richardson, a previous collaborator on the photography book Lady Gaga x Terry Richardson, but remained unreleased. Gaga opened the 2013 MTV Video Music Awards with a performance of "Applause", dissecting her career through a series of costumes and wigs. She then headlined the iTunes Festival on September 1, 2013, and performed new material for a crowd of 5,000 people. Gaga dubbed her gig "SwineFest" after one of the songs, "Swine", that she debuted during the event. For the song "Jewels n' Drugs" Gaga was joined onstage by Too Short and Twista—T.I., initially a part of the show, was unable to participate in the festival after his entry into the United Kingdom was denied. While dismissing some performed songs, journalists had a mostly positive response to Gaga's set. The show was recorded and later included on a second disc with the deluxe edition of Artpop. On September 9, Gaga performed "Applause" on Good Morning America and appeared dressed as multiple characters from The Wizard of Oz.

A trailer for Machete Kills, in which Gaga played La Chameleón, was released on October 4 and featured "Aura". The song's lyric video, directed by Robert Rodriguez, was uploaded onto Gaga's Vevo account five days later, featuring scenes and dialogue from the film. Excerpts of "G.U.Y.", "Artpop", and "Mary Jane Holland" were released periodically over the course of two weeks from October 14 to 28. On October 24, promotional listening sessions of Artpop were organized in Berlin, where Gaga provided a live rendition of "Gypsy". She then made an unannounced appearance at London's G-A-Y nightclub two days later and performed "Venus", generating controversy when she stripped naked during the show. On October 27, Gaga also played "Venus" alongside "Do What U Want" on the tenth series of The X Factor in the United Kingdom. The performance prompted a barrage of complaints to ITV and industry regulator Ofcom, although the network dismissed them. Gaga returned to the United States the following week for a performance of "Dope" at the inaugural YouTube Music Awards and continued to play material from Artpop on The Howard Stern Show, Saturday Night Live, and at the American Music Awards.

The night before the release of Artpop, Gaga hosted an album release party, dubbed "ArtRave". It took place in a large warehouse in the Brooklyn Navy Yard in New York and included a press conference and a live performance. During the press conference, Gaga unveiled the TechHaus Volantis, dubbed "the world's first flying dress", and new works by Inez and Vinoodh, avant-garde theater director Robert Wilson, performance artist Marina Abramović, and artist Jeff Koons. Gaga performed a concert consisting of nine songs from Artpop, (Note: One of the songs performed, "I Wanna Be with You", was an early version of "Dope".) which was streamed live on Vevo and later rebroadcast through the website's syndication partners. It received positive reviews from critics, who complimented Gaga's performance and enthusiasm.

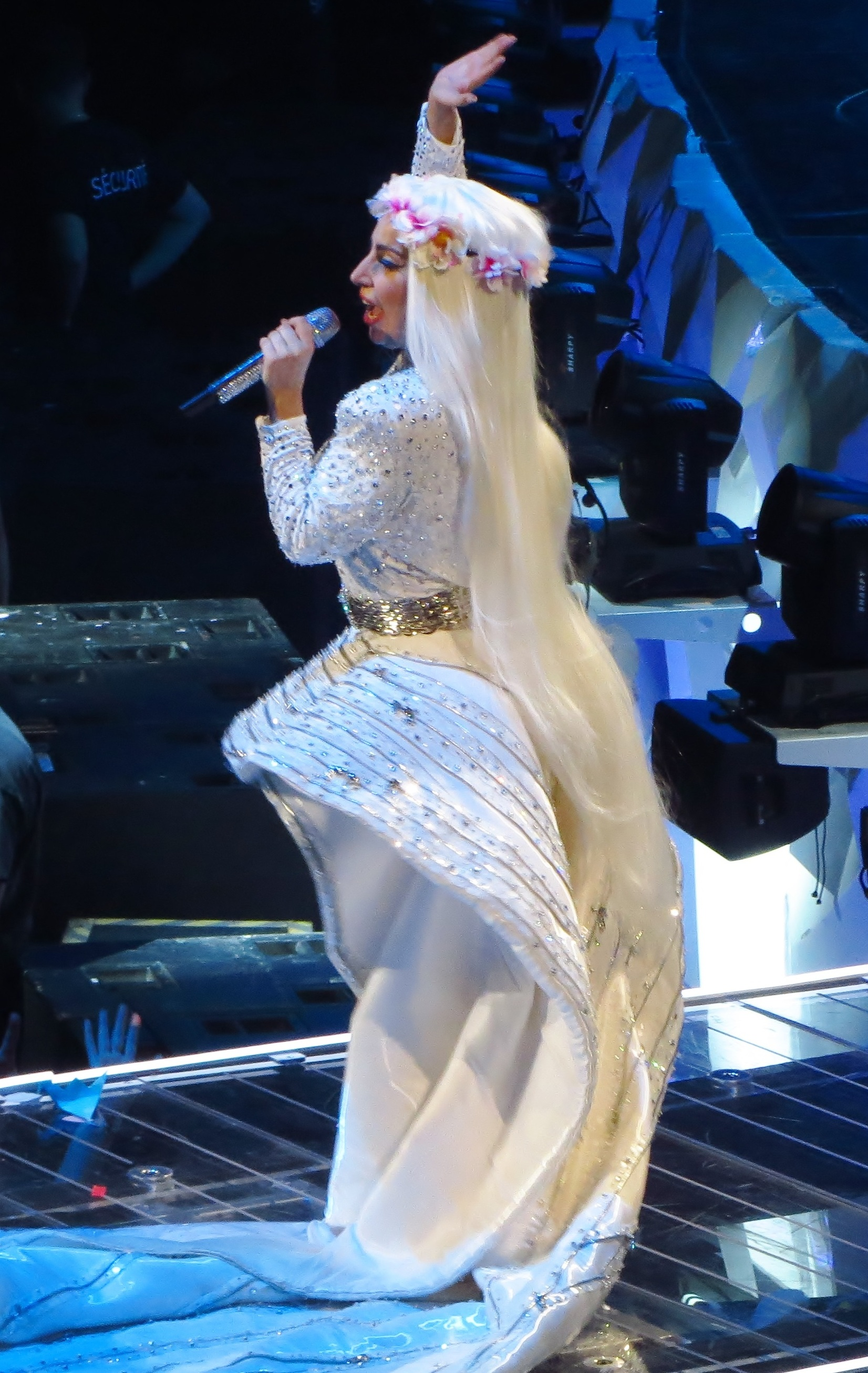
Gaga performing "Gypsy" during her tour, ArtRave: The Artpop Ball

Gaga's second Thanksgiving Day television special, Lady Gaga and the Muppets Holiday Spectacular, aired on November 28 and included performances of "Artpop" with Elton John, "Fashion!" with RuPaul, and "Gypsy" with Kermit the Frog. Some critics praised Gaga for being relatable, while others criticized her for using the holiday special as a mere promotional vehicle. Performances continued in December with an appearance at the British chat show Alan Carr: Chatty Man, a headlining concert at the Jingle Bell Ball, and a performance in the fifth-season finale of The Voice. On February 18, 2014, Gaga performed the title track on The Tonight Show Starring Jimmy Fallon, and on March 13, she headlined the SXSW festival and performed further songs from the album. The performance of "Swine" received criticism for featuring performance artist Millie Brown, who vomited green and black liquid onto Gaga. Gaga later explained that the performance was intended to convey the degradation associated with sexual assault.

=== Residency and tour ===
From March 28 to April 7, 2014, Gaga played the final shows at New York's famed Roseland Ballroom before its closure. Her residency, titled Lady Gaga Live at Roseland Ballroom, was originally announced with four shows. Two additional dates were added due to popular demand, followed by a seventh performance that brought the total to seven. As an homage to the venue, the stage was decorated with roses, and Gaga's wardrobe was also rose themed. The residency received positive reviews from music critics, who found it a better representation of Gaga's abilities as an entertainer than her previous campaigns for Artpop. The residency sold out at above-average ticket prices for the venue; the seven dates sold 24,532 tickets and grossed $1.5 million.

On May 4, 2014, Gaga embarked on the ArtRave: The Artpop Ball tour in support of the album, which encompassed 79 dates and concluded with a livestreamed show in Paris, France. Gaga worked with choreographer Richy Jackson and her creative team to develop a cohesive production, while the lighting was designed and programmed to create an "immersive rave" experience. The tour garnered praise for its entertainment value and Gaga's vocal skills, although the setlist was criticized. It grossed $83 million from 920,088 sold tickets at the 74 performances reported to Billboard Boxscore.

== Critical reception ==
Professional ratings
Aggregate scores
Source	Rating
AnyDecentMusic?	6.0/10
Metacritic	61/100
Review scores
Source	Rating
AllMusic	4/5 stars
The A.V. Club	C−
Entertainment Weekly	B
The Guardian	3/5 stars
NME	3/5 stars
Pitchfork	7.3/10
Robert Christgau	A
Rolling Stone	3/5 stars
Slant Magazine	3.5/5 stars
Spin	6/10

Artpop received mixed responses from music critics. Metacritic calculated an average score of 61 out of 100 based on 30 reviews from critics, indicating "generally favorable reviews". Adam Markovitz of Entertainment Weekly stated that many of the album's songs were "enjoyable but well-worn", further commending the execution of the album and the "melodic lines" of the songs. However, he noted that Artpop generally failed to make an overall impression. Jerry Shriver, writing for USA Today, wrote that the record was not "consistently entertaining", although he noted that the album was mostly intended for Gaga's fans and not for general listeners. Slant Magazine's Sal Cinquemani provided a favorable review, praising its sounds and structures, deeming them familiar. Jason Lipshutz of Billboard commended Gaga's effort to guarantee that "every inch of her craft evolves and innovates". In a positive review, an editor of The Daily Beast declared that "there were moments of expected genius on it worthy of Grammy consideration". Stephen Carlick of Exclaim! felt that Artpop's songwriting and production complemented Gaga's public image more successfully than her earlier releases, describing the album as "dynamic" and "memorable".

Robert Copsey from Digital Spy felt that some songs sounded "half-finished", though he suggested that the album had more good songs than bad ones. Helen Brown, writing in The Daily Telegraph, criticized Gaga's choice to do another album "themed around her own stardom" (after The Fame and The Fame Monster) and commented that although Gaga approached different genres of music, "she doesn't do anything wildly original with them, but she has fun". Brown, however, praised the album as "great for dancing". Alexis Petridis from The Guardian suggested there was "some decent pop" on Artpop but thought the art was "rather harder to discern". Kate Lloyd of NME similarly considered it a "decent pop record", but questioned "Where exactly is the art?". Stephen Thomas Erlewine of AllMusic found the album's concept "artful and logical", but argued that it was "determined to make an impression" even when it "doesn't have much to say". The Independent's Andy Gill commented, "It's hard not to feel underwhelmed by Artpop", while Caryn Ganz from Rolling Stone called it "a bizarre album of squelchy disco" and "sexual but not sexy". Maura Johnston of Spin praised Gaga's charisma but concluded that "the art is sometimes unworthy of the artist". Annie Zaleski of The A.V. Club noted the album's varied musical influences and production, but criticized its lack of playfulness and emotional depth, writing that it often felt "detached from its emotions".

Some critics challenged the negative reception of Artpop. Nick Messitte of Forbes criticized the album's negative reviews for their particularly harsh tone. He also praised Artpop's departure from conventional verse–chorus structures as a "bold" move and questioned whether negative media coverage had influenced audiences' perceptions of the album. Ed Potton of The Times concurred, stating, "It's a wonder you can hear Lady Gaga's third studio album over the sound of knives being sharpened". He also felt that Gaga sounded as though she were having more fun on Artpop than on Born This Way. Robert Christgau, writing for The Barnes & Noble Review, wrote that the record's "critical reaction [was] clueless" and named Artpop "2013's most underrated album". In a positive retrospective review, Claire Lobenfeld of Pitchfork called it Gaga's "most divisive and conceptually ambitious album".

Artpop was included in various year-end lists by music critics and publications. In their list of the "15 Best Albums of 2013", Billboard ranked it at 14th place, stating that it "is the statement of a singer-songwriter who wants to be more than a pop artist" and "hasn't lost her touch for creating otherworldly hooks". Digital Spy similarly included Artpop at number 21 on its "30 Best Albums of 2013" list, while Popjustice ranked the album sixth on its "Top 33 Albums of 2013" list, calling it "amazing". Robert Christgau ranked Artpop sixth on his year-end list of the best albums of 2013. In an accompanying essay for The Barnes & Noble Review, he wrote, "since unlike the young I'm never bombarded by EDM synths at medically inadvisable volumes, this was not only the rawk album of the year for me, it sounded fresh. Really, who needs guitars?" In 2026, Jay Choyce Tibbitts of Paper described Artpop as "an early blueprint for the increasingly experimental world of mainstream pop", arguing that its "abrasive" electronic production and combination of music, conceptual visuals and performance art anticipated later trends in the genre.

== Commercial performance ==
Artpop debuted at number one on the US Billboard 200 with 258,000 copies sold in its first week, earning Gaga her second consecutive number-one album. It recorded the fourth-largest debut sales for an album by a female artist in the United States in 2013, behind Beyoncé's self-titled album, Katy Perry's Prism, and Miley Cyrus's Bangerz. The following week, the record dropped to number eight on the Billboard 200 selling fewer than 46,000 copies, an 82% decrease, making Gaga the first artist to have two albums in the top five list of all-time biggest second-week percentage drops in the Nielsen SoundScan era. In its third week, Artpop rose to number seven on the Billboard 200, selling 116,000 copies. Billboard attributed the increase partly to discounted prices at retailers such as Amazon MP3, Walmart, and Target, as well as exposure from Gaga's Thanksgiving television special. As of 2019, Artpop had sold 781,000 copies in the United States (including 477,000 from physical CD and vinyl sales) and has since been certified Platinum by the Recording Industry Association of America (RIAA) for surpassing one million album-equivalent units. Following Gaga's Super Bowl LI halftime show performance in 2017, Artpop re-entered the Billboard 200 at number 174, earning 5,000 album-equivalent units.

In Canada, the record entered the Canadian Albums Chart at number three, and earned a Platinum certification from Music Canada in its first week for shipping 80,000 copies. On the first day of its availability in Japan, charts provider Oricon reported that Artpop sold 18,109 physical albums, reaching number two. It sold 58,493 copies, debuting atop the Oricon Albums Chart.

Artpop debuted at number one on the UK Albums Chart with first-week sales of 65,608 copies. It fell to number nine in its second week, selling 15,948 copies. The album was certified Gold by the British Phonographic Industry (BPI). By April 2021, it had accumulated 256,000 chart sales in the United Kingdom. In Australia, Artpop opened at number two on the ARIA Albums Chart selling 15,685 copies. In France, Artpop has sold 65,000 copies.

In 2013, the album sold 2.3 million units worldwide, according to the International Federation of the Phonographic Industry (IFPI), making it the ninth-best-selling album of the year. It had sold 2.5 million copies by July 2014. The album's commercial performance led numerous publications to suggest it fell short of sales expectations, while some called it a commercial failure compared to Gaga's previous albums. Due to claims of the album's alleged underperformance, Gaga publicly addressed rumors that its sales lost her label $25 million and led to staff layoffs, calling them fake.

== Aftermath and artistic shift ==
The mixed reception of Artpop marked a turning point in Gaga's career. In a 2025 interview by Rolling Stone, she described the backlash "much more impactful than any other criticism for any artwork", calling the experience "hard". Writing for The Guardian, Caroline Sullivan argued that the album's emphasis on high-concept imagery had begun to eclipse Gaga's music, with her public persona "spiralling into parody" amid declining commercial momentum. In the years that followed, she moved away from her established pop sound, pursuing projects in other genres and media, including jazz recordings with Tony Bennett, acting roles, and the more stripped-down, Americana-influenced album Joanne (2016). Reviewing Joanne, Sullivan noted its reduced emphasis on spectacle and greater focus on Gaga's voice and personal subject matter, while Stephen Thomas Erlewine of AllMusic described the album as a streamlining of her public persona, contrasting its restraint with the excesses of Artpop.

== Planned sequel ==
In October 2012, Gaga considered Artpop "a bit more modern" and mentioned the possibility of splitting the project into a two-volume record; the first would contain the "commercial songs", while the second would feature the "experimental material". In October 2013, Gaga hinted that she had "lots of songs for Act 2". The following month, she mentioned "Act 2" again, noting it might be released before her tour so she could "play both acts on the tour". She dismissed her previous idea of splitting the album, explaining that "this was during the inception of the record and I wasn't even quite sure what Artpop meant yet". During her keynote interview at SXSW in March 2014, Gaga confirmed that she had completed a second act of Artpop, although she did not announce plans to release it. In April 2014, Gaga stated there was "a strong possibility" she would release another volume of Artpop; however, this plan never materialized.

In April 2021, after DJ White Shadow posted an April Fool's joke about the release of Artpop unreleased track "Tea", fans started a petition for Gaga to release the second volume of the album. He promised to send the petition to Gaga if it reached 10,000 signatures. After the petition garnered over 20,000 signatures in a day, White Shadow discussed his experience on Instagram and confirmed he had shared the campaign with Gaga. He wrote, "She has feelings (like any other normal person) and this 'era' was a hard time for her too. I am sure she will be okay with revisiting it one day and building on it when the time is right." He added, "Continue to get your message to the people in charge. You have the power, don't give up". Gaga responded to the campaign on Twitter, describing the album's creation as "like heart surgery" during a time of desperation and pain. She expressed gratitude that fans celebrated "something that once felt like destruction". After Gaga's acknowledgment of the campaign and the #BuyARTPOPoniTunes trend, the petition reached 40,000 signatures on Change.org.

At a fan event and press conference held in February 2025, Gaga said that a second volume of Artpop was "not impossible", but unlikely. She explained that some songs had been left off the original album because she considered them unsuitable for release and did not want to simply compile unreleased demos into a sequel. She added that any follow-up would need to be "reactionary" to what had happened within the fan community and that she would have to revisit the mindset in which she created the original album.

== Track listing ==
Credits adapted from the liner notes of Artpop.

Artpop track listing
No.	Title	Writer(s)	Producer(s)	Length
1.	"Aura"	Lady Gaga; Anton Zaslavski; Amit Duvdevani; Erez Eisen	Zedd; Infected Mushroom; Gaga	3:55
2.	"Venus"	Gaga; Paul "DJ White Shadow" Blair; Hugo Leclercq; Dino Zisis; Nick Monson; Sun Ra	Gaga; Leclercq^{[a]}; Monson^{[b]}	3:53
3.	"G.U.Y."	Gaga; Zaslavski	Zedd; Gaga	3:52
4.	"Sexxx Dreams"	Gaga; Blair; Martin Bresso; William Grigahcine	Blair; Gaga; Monson^{[b]}; Zisis^{[b]}	3:34
5.	"Jewels n' Drugs" (featuring T.I., Too Short, and Twista)	Gaga; Blair; Monson; Zisis; Twista; Too Short; Clifford Harris Jr.	Blair; Gaga; Monson^{[a]}; Zisis^{[a]}	3:48
6.	"Manicure"	Gaga; Blair; Zisis; Monson	Blair; Gaga; Monson^{[a]}; Zisis^{[a]}	3:19
7.	"Do What U Want" (featuring R. Kelly)	Gaga; Blair; Bresso; Grigahcine; R. Kelly	Blair; Gaga	3:47
8.	"Artpop"	Gaga; Blair; Zisis; Monson	Blair; Gaga; Monson^{[a]}; Zisis^{[a]}	4:07
9.	"Swine"	Gaga; Blair; Zisis; Monson	Blair; Gaga; Monson^{[a]}; Zisis^{[a]}	4:28
10.	"Donatella"	Gaga; Zaslavski; Anjulie Persaud	Zedd; Gaga	4:24
11.	"Fashion!"	Gaga; Giorgio Tuinfort; William Adams; David Guetta; Blair	Tuinfort; will.i.am; Guetta; Gaga	3:59
12.	"Mary Jane Holland"	Gaga; Leclercq	Leclercq; Gaga	4:37
13.	"Dope"	Gaga; Blair; Monson; Zisis	Rick Rubin; Gaga	3:41
14.	"Gypsy"	Gaga; RedOne; Leclercq; Blair	Leclercq; Gaga	4:08
15.	"Applause"	Gaga; Blair; Zisis; Monson; Bresso; Nicolas Mercier; Julien Arias; Grigahcine	Blair; Gaga; Monson^{[a]}; Zisis^{[a]}	3:32
Total length:				59:04

=== Notes ===
- ^{^[a]} signifies a co-producer
- ^{^[b]} signifies an additional producer
- "Venus" contains a publishing sample from "Rocket Number 9", written by Sun Ra, and a sample of "Rocket n°9" by Zombie Zombie.
- "Sexxx Dreams" is titled "X Dreams", and the title of "Jewels n' Drugs" is bowdlerized as "Jewels n' *****" on censored versions of the album.
- "Manicure" is stylized as "MANiCURE".
- "Do What U Want" was removed from digital stores and streaming services on January 10, 2019, due to the sexual abuse allegations against R. Kelly. On November 11, 2019, when the album was re-issued on CD and vinyl, "Do What U Want" was excluded from the track list.
- "Artpop" is stylized as "ARTPOP".
- Deluxe Edition includes a DVD with live performances from the iTunes Festival.
- Walmart and Japanese CD editions include the DJ White Shadow Electrotech remix and the Viceroy remix of "Applause".
- Japanese CD and iTunes Store editions also includes the Empire of the Sun remix of "Applause".
- Japanese deluxe edition includes a DVD with an original Japanese video interview.
- The Japanese 10th-anniversary edition includes a DVD featuring footage of an Artpop press conference held on December 1, 2013, and Gaga's arrival at Narita International Airport on August 12, 2014.

== Personnel ==
Credits adapted from the liner notes of Artpop.

=== Performers ===
- Lady Gaga – production, vocals (all tracks); bass arrangement (2); guitar arrangement (4, 8, 14); synth arrangement (7); backing vocals arrangement (8, 9, 14); piano arrangement (8, 14); piano (13); executive producer
- Doug Aldrich – guitar (6)
- Sean C. Erick – horn (6)
- Natalie Ganther – backing vocals (5, 8, 9, 14)
- Nicole Ganther – backing vocals (5, 8, 9, 14)
- Lyon Gray – backing vocals (5, 8, 9, 14)
- R. Kelly – vocals (7)
- Jason Lader – digital editing, keyboards, recording (13)
- Hugo Leclercq – arrangement, co-production, synth parts (2); drum programming (12); mixing, production (12, 14)
- Donnie Lyle – bass guitar (4); musical director for R. Kelly (7)
- Adam MacDougall – keyboards (13)
- Nick Monson – additional production (2, 4); bass arrangement, synth parts (2); co-production (5, 6, 8, 9, 15); guitar arrangement (8)
- Rick Pearl – additional programming (4, 6, 8, 9, 15); programming (5)
- Pierre-Luc Rioux – guitar (11)
- Leon H. Silva – horn (6)
- Tim Stewart – guitar (2, 4, 6, 7, 14)
- T.I. – rap (5)
- Ricky Tillo – guitar (12)
- Joanne Tominaga – arrangement, instrumentation
- Too Short – rap (5)
- Giorgio Tuinfort – instrumentation, piano, production, programming, recording (11)
- Twista – rap (5)
- Bijon S. Watson – horn (6)
- will.i.am – instrumentation, production, programming, vocal recording (11)
- Kevin Williams – horn (6)

=== Production and recording ===
- Gretchen Anderson – production
- George Atkins – recording (11)
- Sam Biggs – recording assistant (11)
- Paul "DJ White Shadow" Blair – production (4–9, 15); co-executive producer
- Delbert Bowers – mixing assistant (2, 5, 12–14)
- Elliot Carter – additional recording (5)
- Jon Castelli – mixing (9)
- Dave "Squirrel" Covell – recording assistant (13)
- Daddy's Groove – mixing (11)
- Lisa Einhorn-Gilder – production coordinator
- Steve Faye – recording assistant (13, 14)
- Chris Galland – mixing assistant (2, 5, 12–14)
- Abel Garibaldi – recording (R. Kelly's vocals) (7)
- Gene Grimaldi – mastering
- David Guetta – production (11)
- Vincent Herbert – A&R, executive producer
- Justin Hergett – mixing assistant (9)
- Ryan Hewitt – recording (13)
- Ghazi Hourani – additional recording (2, 4, 7, 14); mixing assistant (4, 6, 7, 15); recording assistant (5)
- Infected Mushroom – production (1)
- Eric Lynn – recording assistant (13)
- Bill Malina – additional recording (2, 6, 13, 14); additional mixing (4, 6, 7, 15); guitar arrangement (4); recording (4, 5, 7, 14)
- Manny Marroquin – mixing (2, 5, 12–14)
- Tony Maserati – mixing (9)
- Ian Mereness – recording (R. Kelly's vocals) (7)
- Sean Oakley – recording (13)
- Benjamin Rice – recording assistant (1–10, 12, 14, 15); mixing assistant (4, 6–8, 15); recording (4, 5, 8, 9, 12, 14); programming assistant (9)
- Andrew Robertson – recording assistant (4, 6, 12, 14, 15)
- Rick Rubin – production (13)
- Dave Russell – recording (1–10, 12, 14, 15); mixing (6–8, 15)
- Andrew Scheps – additional mixing (13)
- Ryan Shanahan – mixing assistant (1, 3, 10)
- Zane Shoemake – recording assistant (R. Kelly vocals) (7)
- Joshua Smith – recording assistant (13)
- Jesse Taub – mixing assistant (1, 3, 10)
- Austin Thomas – recording assistant (4)
- Daniel Zaidenstadt – recording assistant (4, 5, 8, 9, 14); additional recording (5, 9)
- Zedd – mixing, production (1, 3, 10)
- Dino Zisis – additional mixing (4, 7–9); additional production (4); co-production (5, 6, 8, 9, 15)

=== Design ===
- Frederic Aspiras – hair
- Sonja Durham – instructional voice (3); creative coordination
- Jeff Koons – album cover, package design
- Brandon Maxwell – fashion director
- Julian Peploe – text layout
- Tara Savelo – makeup

== Charts ==
=== Weekly charts ===
Weekly chart performance for Artpop
Chart (2013–2021)	Peak position
Australian Albums (ARIA)	2
Australian Dance Albums (ARIA)	1
Austrian Albums (Ö3 Austria)	1
Belgian Albums (Ultratop Flanders)	2
Belgian Albums (Ultratop Wallonia)	2
Canadian Albums (Billboard)	3
Chinese Albums (Sino Chart)	4
Croatian Albums (HDU)	1
Czech Albums (ČNS IFPI)	3
Danish Albums (Hitlisten)	5
Dutch Albums (Album Top 100)	4
Finnish Albums (Suomen virallinen lista)	3
French Albums (SNEP)	3
German Albums (Offizielle Top 100)	3
Greek Albums (IFPI)	4
Hungarian Albums (MAHASZ)	17
Irish Albums (IRMA)	2
Italian Albums (FIMI)	2
Japanese Albums (Oricon)	1
Mexican Albums (AMPROFON)	1
New Zealand Albums (RMNZ)	2
Norwegian Albums (VG-lista)	4
Polish Albums (ZPAV)	8
Portuguese Albums (AFP)	4
Scottish Albums (Official Charts)	1
Slovak Albums (ČNS IFPI)	44
South African Albums (RISA)	19
South Korean Albums (Circle)	3
South Korean International Albums (Circle)	1
Spanish Albums (Promusicae)	3
Swedish Albums (Sverigetopplistan)	6
Swiss Albums (Schweizer Hitparade)	2
Taiwan International Albums (G-Music)	1
UK Albums (Official Charts)	1
US Billboard 200	1
US Top Dance Albums (Billboard)	1
US Indie Store Album Sales (Billboard)	3

=== Monthly charts ===
Monthly chart performance for Artpop
Chart (2013)	Peak position
Argentine Monthly Albums (CAPIF)	8

=== Year-end charts ===
Year-end chart performance for Artpop
Chart (2013)	Position
Argentine Yearly Albums (CAPIF) Standard edition	67
Argentine Yearly Albums (CAPIF) Deluxe edition	88
Australian Albums (ARIA)	72
Australian Dance Albums (ARIA)	9
Belgian Albums (Ultratop Flanders)	110
Belgian Albums (Ultratop Wallonia)	88
Brazilian Albums (ABPD)	16
French Albums (SNEP)	113
Hungarian Albums (MAHASZ)	57
Italian Albums (FIMI)	50
Japanese Albums (Oricon)	45
Mexican Albums (AMPROFON)	23
South Korean International Albums (Circle)	20
Swedish Albums (Sverigetopplistan)	54
Swiss Albums (Schweizer Hitparade)	74
UK Albums (Official Charts)	52
US Billboard 200	103
US Dance/Electronic Albums (Billboard)	2
Worldwide (IFPI)	9

Chart (2014)	Position
Australian Dance Albums (ARIA)	31
Canadian Albums (Billboard)	23
Chinese Albums (Sino Chart)	19
Japanese Albums (Oricon)	33
Swedish Albums (Sverigetopplistan)	65
US Billboard 200	34
US Dance/Electronic Albums (Billboard)	1

Chart (2016)	Position
Australian Dance Albums (ARIA)	44

=== Decade-end charts ===
Decade-end chart performance for Artpop
Chart (2010–2019)	Position
US Dance/Electronic Albums (Billboard)	31

== Certifications and sales ==
Certifications and sales for Artpop
Region	Certification	Certified units/sales
Argentina	Gold	
Australia (ARIA)	Gold	35,000^{‡}
Austria (IFPI Austria)	Gold	7,500^{*}
Brazil (Pro-Música Brasil)	Platinum	40,000^{*}
Canada (Music Canada)	Platinum	80,000^{^}
Colombia	Gold	
France (SNEP)	Platinum	100,000^{*}
Germany (BVMI)	Gold	100,000^{‡}
Hungary (MAHASZ)	Gold	1,000^{^}
Italy (FIMI)	Gold	30,000^{*}
Japan (RIAJ)	Platinum	250,000^{^}
Mexico (AMPROFON)	Platinum	60,000^{^}
New Zealand (RMNZ)	Platinum	15,000^{‡}
Norway (IFPI Norway)	Gold	10,000^{‡}
Poland (ZPAV)	Gold	10,000^{*}
South Korea	—	3,856
Spain (Promusicae)	Gold	20,000^{^}
Sweden (GLF)	Gold	20,000^{‡}
Switzerland (IFPI Switzerland)	Platinum	20,000^{‡}
United Kingdom (BPI)	Gold	256,000
United States (RIAA)	Platinum	1,000,000^{‡}
Summaries
Worldwide (IFPI)	—	2,500,000
^{*} Sales figures based on certification alone.^{^} Shipments figures based on certification alone.^{‡} Sales+streaming figures based on certification alone.

== Release history ==
Release dates and formats for Artpop
Region	Date	Format(s)	Label	Ref.
Japan	November 6, 2013	CD; CD+DVD; digital download	Universal Music	
Australia	November 8, 2013	CD; CD+DVD; digital download	Universal Music	
France	November 8, 2013	Digital download	Universal Music	
Germany	November 8, 2013	CD; CD+DVD; digital download	Universal Music	
Italy	November 8, 2013	Digital download	Universal Music	
United Kingdom	November 8, 2013	Digital download	Polydor	
France	November 11, 2013	CD; CD+DVD	Universal Music	
United Kingdom	November 11, 2013	CD; CD+DVD	Polydor	
United States	November 11, 2013	CD; digital download	Streamline; Interscope	
Italy	November 12, 2013	CD; CD+DVD	Universal Music	
Poland	November 12, 2013	CD	Universal Music	
China	January 21, 2014	CD	Universal Music	
Germany	February 21, 2014	LP	Universal Music	
Australia	February 28, 2014	LP	Universal Music	
France	March 3, 2014	LP	Universal Music	
United Kingdom	March 3, 2014	LP	Polydor	
United States	March 24, 2014	LP	Streamline; Interscope	
Japan	December 6, 2023	CD+DVD	Universal Music	

== See also ==
- List of Billboard 200 number-one albums of 2013
- List of number-one albums of 2013 (Mexico)
- List of UK Albums Chart number ones of the 2010s
