= The Golden Filter =

Electronic music duo

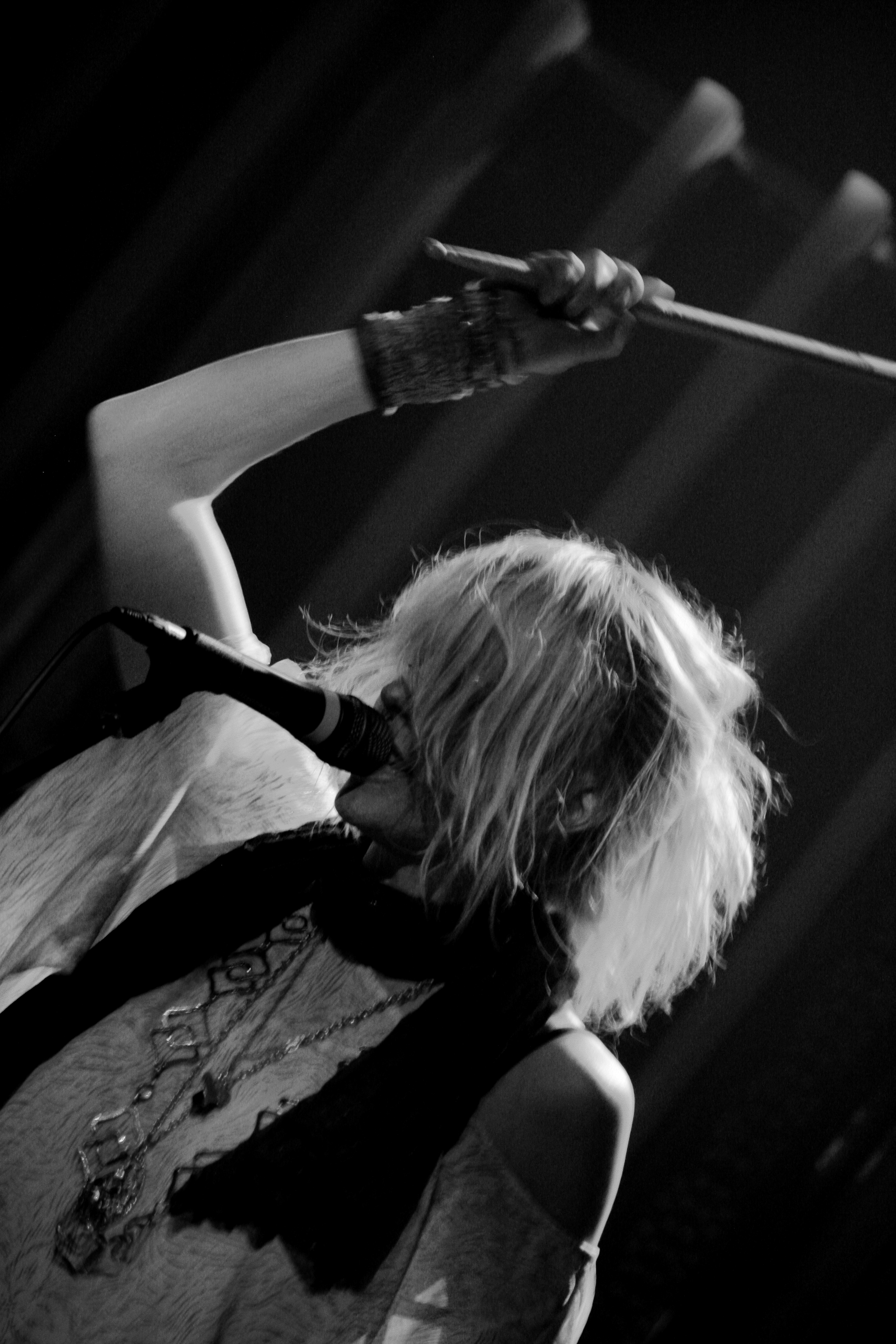
- The Golden Filter performing on the Presets' tour in Toronto in 2009

Background information
- Origin: New York City, U.S.
- Genres: Electropop; synth-pop
- Years active: 2008–present
- Labels: Optimo Music; The Vinyl Factory; Cin Cin; Correspondant; Dummy; Brille; Perfectly Isolated
- Members: Penelope Trappes; Stephen Hindman
- Website: www.thegoldenfilter.com

The Golden Filter is an American and Australian electronic music duo formed in New York City in 2008, now based in London. The band consists of Penelope Trappes and Stephen Hindman.

== History ==
Lead singer Penelope Trappes grew up in Lismore, near Byron Bay, New South Wales, Australia, while analogue synth programmer and producer Stephen Hindman is originally from Ohio, United States.

They produced their debut single, "Solid Gold", in July 2008, after being influenced by Italo mix CDs given to them by Josh Cheon (Dark Entries records). "Solid Gold" was eventually released on February 15, 2009, on Dummy Records. Its video was filmed in Australia, near Melbourne. They have also remixed tracks for artists such as Unkle, Cut Copy, Empire of the Sun, Peter Bjorn and John, and Yeasayer.

The Golden Filter performed at the SXSW Music Festival at least seven times in March 2009, and toured North America with the Presets between March 30 and April 20, 2009, performing on sixteen dates altogether. They have also done two short UK tours and a European festival tour in 2010.

They appeared at the Iceland Airwaves Festival on October 16, 2009. On November 16, their second single, "Thunderbird", was released by Dummy.

Their debut album, Voluspa, released on the UK label Brille Records on April 26, 2010, is named after the ancient Nordic poem Völuspá which relates the story of the creation of the world and its coming end. Promotion of Voluspa started on January 16, 2010, with a fifty-second viral video called "Open Your Eyes".

In 2011, the Golden Filter collaborated with Norwegian director Kristoffer Borgli to create a ten-minute short film titled Syndromes. The film stars Emma Aars and is set in a small town in Norway where "a young girl with a secret talent finds herself unwillingly entwined in an elite underworld of healing that only the ailing wealthy are aware of." The narrative is based on the song "Mother", whose lyrics "revolve around a beautifully tragic personal story about the fear of inevitable loss." The film was released on 10 October 2011 as a CD/DVD package on the duo's own Perfectly Isolated label, along with an accompanying soundtrack featuring six original songs, which was also released digitally as well as in a special limited vinyl and art edition of 300 copies, including an exclusive poster hand-signed by the duo. The vinyl edition is housed in a gatefold sleeve, and also includes a DVD of the film. "Mother" was released digitally on September 11, 2011.

In 2014, the Golden Filter debuted their side project SO SO IN LUV with the single "1+0nly". The project was inspired by their "befriending a few inspiring and talented people at PC Music" following their move to London in 2014. SO SO IN LUV released several singles, compilation tracks, and mixes over the next few years, and while the project was initially anonymous, they revealed their identity when the alias was retired in early 2018. They had continued to release music as the Golden Filter during and after this time, as well as releasing solo music (Penelope Trappes under her own name and Hindman under the name "Quays").

== Discography ==
=== Studio albums ===
- Voluspa (2010 Brille Records)
- Unselected Works Vol I (2014 - The Vinyl Factory)
- Unselected Works Vol II (2014 - The Vinyl Factory)
- Unselected Works Vol III (2014 - The Vinyl Factory)
- Still // Alone (2017 - Optimo Music)

=== Mini albums / EPs ===
- Syndromes (2011 - The Vinyl Factory)
- PS1103 (2015 - Optimo Music)
- End Of Times (2017 - Optimo Music)
- Dub Of Times (2018 - Optimo Music)
- Dislocation (2018 - 4GN3S)

=== Singles ===
- "Solid Gold" (Dummy, 2009)
- "Thunderbird" (Brille, 2009)
- "Hide Me" (Brille, 2010)
- "White Nights" (Brille, 2010)
- "Mother" (Perfectly Isolated/Vinyl Factory, 2011)
- "Kill Me" (Perfectly Isolated/Vinyl Factory, 2012)
- "Quiet Town" (Visage Musique, 2012)
- "Start Over" (Optimo Music, 2015)
- "Dust" (Optimo Music, 2017)
- "End Of Times" (Optimo Music, 2017)
- "Aya" (Cin Cin, 2018)
- "Talk Talk Talk" (4GN3S, 2018)

=== Compilation appearances ===
| Title | Year | Album | Artist(s) |
|---|---|---|---|
| "Solid Gold" | 2009 | Infinity +1 | A-Trak |
| "Favourite Things" | 2009 | Kitsuné Maison Compilation 7 | Various |
| "Solid Gold" | 2009 | Sisters | Various |
| "Solid Gold" (Extended Version) | 2009 | Mashed 5 | Beni and Miami Horror |
| "Solid Gold" | 2009 | Leave Them All Behind III | Various |
| "Solid Gold" (Extended Version) | 2009 | Chillout Sessions XII | Various |
| "Solid Gold" | 2010 | UNKLE 2010 US Tour Sampler | Various |
| "Nerida's Gone" | 2010 | UNKLE 2010 US Tour Sampler | Various |
| "M112" | 2018 | Correspondent Compilation 06 | Various |

=== Remixes ===
| Title | Year | Artist |
|---|---|---|
| "Far Away" | 2008 | Cut Copy |
| "Lay It Down" | 2009 | Peter Bjorn and John |
| "Please Don't Touch" | 2009 | Polly Scattergood |
| "We Are the People" | 2009 | Empire of the Sun |
| "New in Town" | 2009 | Little Boots |
| "Dead Disco Dancer" | 2009 | O. Children |
| "Follow Me Down" | 2010 | Unkle |
| "Madder Red" | 2010 | Yeasayer |
| "Excuses" | 2010 | The Morning Benders |
| "I've Got Your Music" | 2012 | Saint Etienne |
| "I Don't Want to Watch You Read" | 2016 | Marc Houle |
| "Another View" | 2017 | Curses |
| "Black Magic" | 2017 | Kasper Bjørke and Colder |
