= Do Rabbits Wonder? =

Studio album by Whirlwind Heat
- Released: April 15, 2003
- Studio: Grand Studios (Detroit, MI); Tarbox Road Studios (Cassadaga, NY)
- Genre: Noise-rock; Indie rock; Post-hardcore; Dance-punk
- Length: 34:19
- Label: Third Man; V2
- Producer: Jack White

Whirlwind Heat chronology
Do Rabbits Wonder? (2003)	Flamingo Honey (2005)

Do Rabbits Wonder? is the first full-length album released by Whirlwind Heat, recorded and produced by Jack White of the White Stripes as the debut album of his imprint label on V2 Records, Third Man Records.

== Critical reception ==
Professional ratings
Aggregate scores
Source	Rating
Metacritic	62/100
Review scores
Source	Rating
AllMusic	3.5/5 stars
No Ripcord	5/10
Pitchfork	2.7/10
Rolling Stone	3/5 stars

Do Rabbits Wonder? received generally positive reviews from music critics. At Metacritic, which assigns a normalized rating out of 100 from mainstream critics, the album received an average score of 62, based on 13 reviews.

AllMusic's Heather Phares praised the band for displaying their idiosyncratic sludge rock with gusto and charm throughout the color-filled track list, concluding that the band's "major-label-level exposure is almost as refreshing as its noisy weirdness." Tom Moon of Rolling Stone praised the album for utilizing the punk blues formula set by the White Stripes and adding their own take on it, concluding that the result is "the kinetic rush of vintage punk minus the self-conscious nostalgia, the discipline of pop songcraft with, thankfully, no sugar added." Jason Jackowiak of Splendid was mixed about the album, saying that there were great ideas heard throughout but were brought down by the instruments taking away the songs' melody, concluding that: "Any hopes that their label boss/producer might plug in and inject some six-string vitality into the humdrum proceeding are dashed to bits as "Grey" fizzles out in a tempest of gargling mini-moog."

Cam Lindsay of No Ripcord was also intrigued by the band's approach to their music with the color-coded track list but was put off by the instrumentation being overly idiosyncratic and stripping the melody away from the songs, saying that "for those who have difficulty trusting the hype, Do Rabbits Wonder? is just too much of a silly mess to really enjoy." Pitchfork's Eric Carr heavily panned the album, criticizing the band for being similar to Devo but with misused vocals and instruments that become incoherent arrangements that are hard to listen to, concluding that, "If nothing else can be said in its favor, this is music that will instantly, violently polarize people: some folks' inner masochists may welcome it as an alternative to self-flagellation; personally, I'd rather take sandpaper across my corneas than sit through this thing again." He also singled out Jack White, V2 and Rolling Stone's promotion of the band for the album's creation.

Stephen Siegel of Tucson Weekly wrote: "Chock full of Moogs, herky-jerky guitars and grating vocals, this has to be one of the least commercially viable albums ever released on a major label--which, in the case of, say, Trout Mask Replica, was a good thing, but in this case, it is not."

== Track listing ==
All tracks are written by Whirlwind Heat.

No.	Title	Length
1.	"Orange"	2:28
2.	"Black"	3:07
3.	"Purple"	2:43
4.	"Tan"	3:21
5.	"Green"	3:12
6.	"Blue"	2:23
7.	"Yellow"	3:08
8.	"Pink"	2:12
9.	"Red"	2:28
10.	"Brown"	2:37
11.	"Silver"	2:04
12.	"White"	2:26
13.	"Grey"	2:10

== Personnel ==
Adapted from the album's liner notes.

Whirlwind Heat

- Brad Holland – drums
- Steve Damstra – bass
- David Swanson – vocals, synthesizer

Production

- Brendan Benson – engineering
- Dave Fridmann – engineering
- Jim Diamond – mixing (on "Tan")
- Mike Marsh – mastering
- Bill Racine – assistant engineer

Imagery

- Winston Maxwell – photography
