= Types of Wood =

Studio album by Whirlwind Heat
- Released: 2006
- Genre: Indie rock
- Length: 39:42
- Label: Brille Records

Whirlwind Heat chronology
| Flamingo Honey (2004) | Types of Wood (2006) | Self Titled or Scoop Du Jour (2008) |

Professional ratings
Aggregate scores
| Source | Rating |
|---|---|
| Metacritic | 47/100 |
Review scores
| Source | Rating |
| AllMusic | 3/5 stars |
| Alternative Press | 3/5 stars |
| Gigwise | 3.5/5 stars |
| musicOMH | 1/5 stars |
| NME | 6/10 |
| Playlouder | 1.5/5 stars |
| PopMatters | 4/10 |
| Spin | 2/5 stars |
| Uncut | 4/10 |
| URB | 2.5/5 stars |

Types of Wood is the second full-length album released by the American three piece band Whirlwind Heat. It featured model Susan Eldridge on the cover.

== Track listing ==
| No. | Title | Length |
|---|---|---|
| 1. | "Air Miami" | 2:33 |
| 2. | "Reagan" | 2:42 |
| 3. | "Gene Pool Style" | 3:45 |
| 4. | "Up-Tight" | 4:25 |
| 5. | "Captain Cave" | 3:10 |
| 6. | "Slugger" | 3:02 |
| 7. | "Umbrella People" | 1:56 |
| 8. | "The Sun Is Round" | 3:12 |
| 9. | "French" | 3:51 |
| 10. | "My Electric Underwear" | 3:44 |
| 11. | "Nylon Heart" | 8:21 |
