= Envelopes (band) =

French-Swedish indie-pop band

- Origin: Sweden/France
- Genres: Indie/Pop
- Years active: 2004–present
- Members: Henrik Orrling - vocals, guitar, keyboards Audrey Pic - vocals, guitar Fredrik Berglind-Dehlin - guitar Martin Karlsson - bass Filip Ekander - drums

Envelopes is an indie-pop band with members hailing from Sweden and France.

== History ==
Envelopes' debut album Demon (Swedish for The Demo or Demos) was released in the UK in August 2005 and in America in April 2006. The album was recorded at Henrik Orrling's family farm in Sweden, where the video for their single Sister in Love was also filmed. Demon also includes home recordings dating from 2001 to 2004.

Envelopes toured the UK in February 2004. They played at SXSW in 2006, and toured the US with Ratatat in September 2006.

August 2007 saw the band make a full album mixtape available as an mp3 on their website. Entitled 'Soup of Germs', the album features 11 Envelopes tracks spliced together with samples of their influences and favourite artists, such as The B-52's, Talking Heads and Pink Floyd. This mixtape album was also distributed for free at various gigs in CD format, along with the 'Soup of Germs' packaging.

Their second album, "Here Comes The Wind", was released in February 2008, on Brille Records.

== Discography ==
=== Albums ===
- Demon (2006) - Brille
- Here Comes The Wind (2008) - Brille

=== Singles and EPs ===
- I Don't Like It (2004) - Rex Records
- Sister in Love (2005) - Brille
- Freejazz (2006) - Brille
- I Don't Even Know (LA Priest remix) - Brille
- Smoke In The Desert, Eating The Sand, Hide In The Grass (2007) - Brille
- Life on the Beach (2007) - Brille
- Party (2008) - Brille
- Put on Hold
