= Flamingo Honey =

EP by Whirlwind Heat
- Released: 2004
- Genre: Indie rock
- Label: Dim Mak
- Producer: Brendan Benson

Whirlwind Heat chronology
Do Rabbits Wonder? (2002)	Flamingo Honey (2004)	Types of Wood (2006)

Professional ratings
Review scores
Source	Rating
Pitchfork Media	(2.9/10.0) link

Flamingo Honey is an EP by Whirlwind Heat, released on August 24, 2004, by Dim Mak Records. It consists of ten 1-minute songs, and was produced by Brendan Benson.

The album was rated 3.5 out of five stars by AllMusic.

== Track listing ==
1. The Bone
2. The Meat Packers
3. No Gums
4. H is O
5. A Worms Coat
6. Muffler
7. Flamingo Lawns
8. Ice-Nine
9. Pearl Earrings
10. Lazy Morning

Flamingo Honey was released on CD and limited edition 10" vinyl. All 10 tracks are on the A-side, and the B-side is blank with unique engraved drawings and lyrics done by the band.
