= Terry Richardson =

American photographer (born 1965)

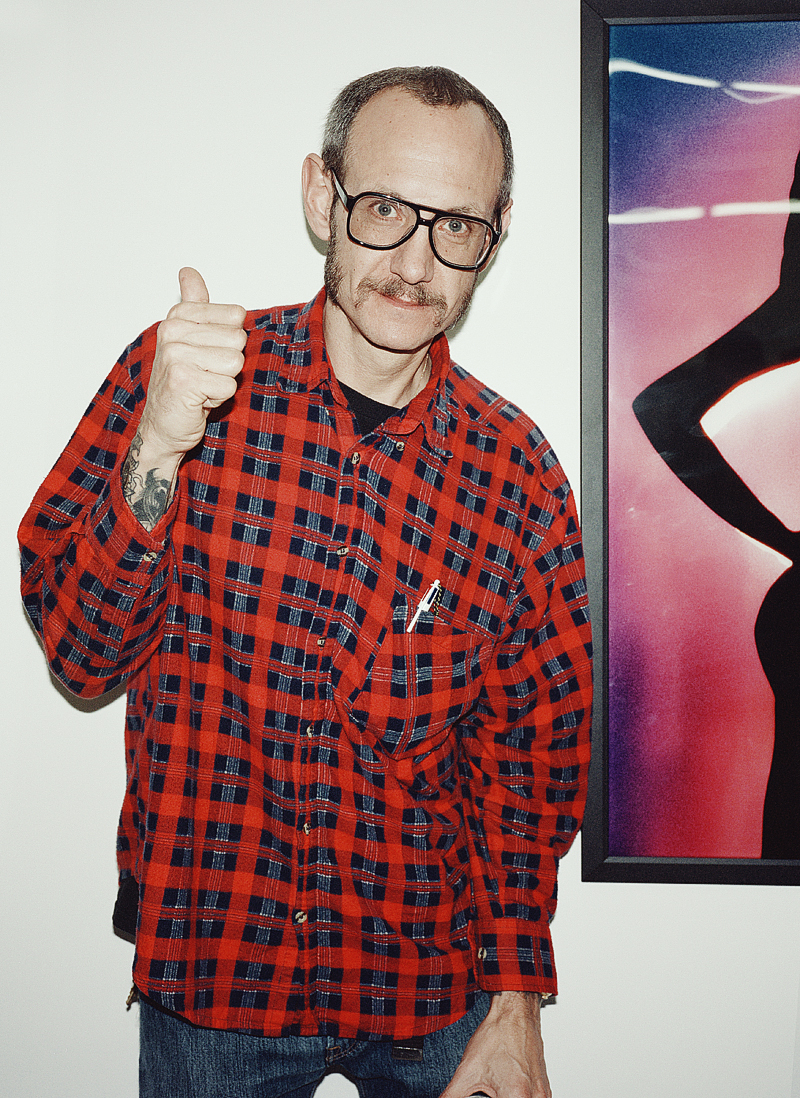
- Richardson in 2012
- Born: August 14, 1965 (age 61); New York City, U.S
- Occupation: Fashion photographer
- Years active: 1993–2018
- Agent: Art Partner
- Known for: Photography
- Style: Punk aesthetic, "amateur" aesthetic
- Spouses: Nikki Uberti (m. 1996; div. 1999) Alexandra Bolotow (m. 2017)
- Children: 2
- Parents: Bob Richardson; Norma Kessler
- Website: www.terryrichardson.com

Terrence Richardson (born August 14, 1965) is an American former fashion and portrait photographer. He has shot advertising campaigns for Marc Jacobs, Aldo, Supreme, Sisley, Tom Ford, and Yves Saint Laurent among others, and also done work for magazines such as Rolling Stone, GQ, Vogue, Vanity Fair, Harper's Bazaar, i-D, and Vice.

Since 2001, Richardson has been accused by multiple models of sexual misconduct. In 2017, brands and magazines that had worked with Richardson in the past began distancing themselves from him, and said they would no longer employ him. He has not actively worked as a photographer since 2018.

== Early life ==
Richardson was born in New York City, the son of Norma Kessler, an actress, and Bob Richardson, a fashion photographer who struggled with schizophrenia and drug abuse. Richardson's father was Irish Catholic and his mother is Jewish. Following the divorce of his parents, Richardson moved to Woodstock, New York, with his mother and stepfather, English guitarist Jackie Lomax. Richardson later moved to the Hollywood neighborhood of Los Angeles, where he attended Hollywood High School.

He moved with his mother to Ojai, California, where he attended Nordhoff High School, when he was 16. Richardson originally wanted to be a punk rock musician rather than a photographer. He played bass guitar in the punk rock band The Invisible Government for four years. He played bass for a variety of other punk bands in Southern California including Signal Street Alcoholics, Doggy Style, Baby Fist and Middle Finger.

== Career ==
Richardson's mother reportedly gave him his first snapshot camera in 1982, which he used to document his life and the punk rock scene in Ojai. In 1992, Richardson quit music and moved to the East Village neighborhood of New York City, where he began photographing young people partying and other nightlife. It was in New York City that he had his first "big break."

His first published fashion photos appeared in Vibe in 1994. His Vibe spread was shown at Paris' International Festival de la Mode later that year. Following the showing, Richardson shot an advertising campaign for fashion designer Katharine Hamnett's spring 1995 collection. The campaign was noted for images of young women wearing short skirts with their pubic hair showing.

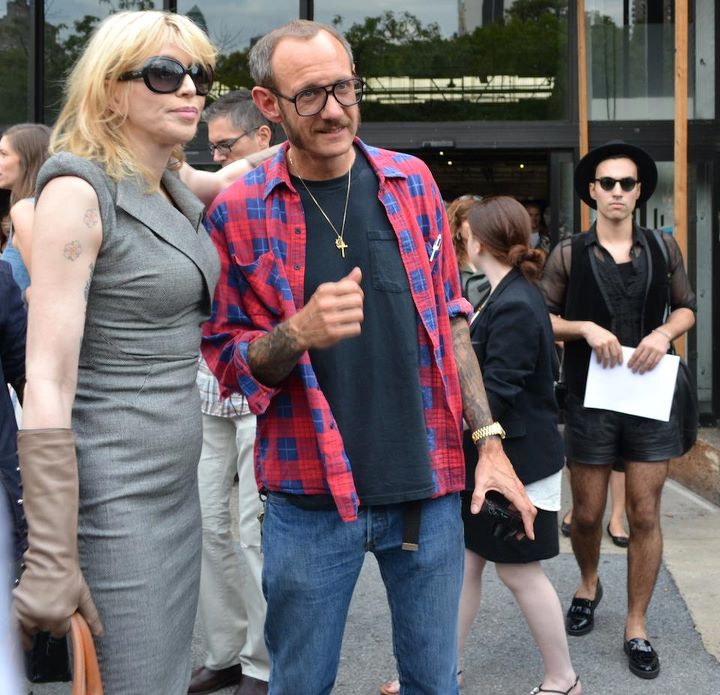
Richardson (right) with Courtney Love attending New York Fashion Week in 2011

Richardson then moved to London and worked for the magazines The Face, i-D and Arena.

Throughout his career, Richardson has shot the campaigns of fashion brands and designers such as Marc Jacobs, Aldo, Supreme, Sisley, Tom Ford, and Yves Saint Laurent. He has also worked for magazines such as Rolling Stone, GQ, Vogue, Vanity Fair, and Harper's Bazaar.

Richardson has produced several campaigns for Diesel, including the 'Global Warming Ready' which won a Silver Lion for Print at Cannes Lions International Advertising Festival in 2007. He has produced several private portraits for the company's founder, Renzo Rosso. In September 2011, they hosted a mutual book launch together with fashion editor Carine Roitfeld, at Colette in Paris.

In 2012 Richardson embarked on his first solo exhibition at Los Angeles's OHWOW Gallery, titled Terrywood. In May 2012, a video of model Kate Upton performing the Cat Daddy dance for Richardson in his studio went viral. In December 2012, Lady Gaga announced that Richardson was filming a documentary about her life. Gavin McInnes of Vice defended Richardson in 2004, saying his work was criticized by "first-year feminist types."

=== Gallery shows ===
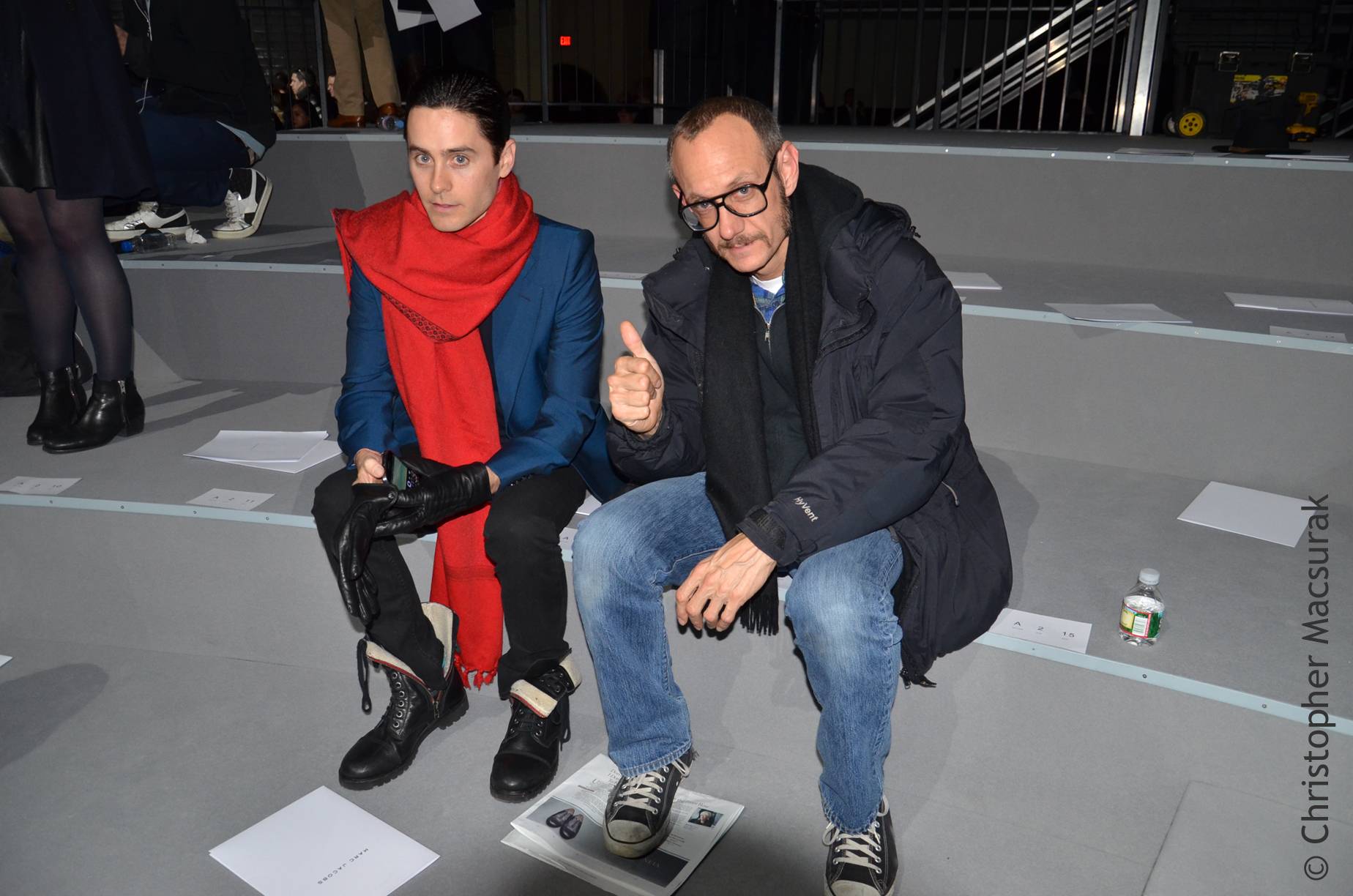
Richardson with Jared Leto in 2012

Richardson held his first gallery showing in 1998. The show, entitled These Colors Don't Run and held at Alleged Gallery, coincided with the release of his first book entitled Hysteric Glamour. His work was later included in another show entitled Smile at Alleged Gallery. Richardson had his first Paris show at Galarie Emmanuel Perrotin in 1999. Richardson's "Feared by Men Desired by Women" was shown at an exhibition at London's Shine Gallery the following year.

Terryworld, an exhibition of Richardson's work of the name, was shown in 2004 at Deitch Gallery in New York City. The Orange County Museum of Art showed Richardson's work as part of a group show entitled Beautiful Losers in 2005. Mom + Dad, a show exhibiting work from Richardson's book of the same name, was held at Half Gallery in New York City in 2011. The same year, photographs from Richardson's book Hong Kong were shown at Art Hong Kong. Richardson's work was later shown at Los Angeles's OHWOW Gallery. The exhibition was titled Terrywood and ran from February 24 to March 31, 2012.

=== Music videos ===
Richardson began directing music videos in the late 1990s. He directed videos for Death in Vegas and Primal Scream as well as alternate music video of the song "Find a New Way" by Young Love, and Whirlwind Heat's "Purple" featuring models Susan Eldridge and Charlotte Kemp Muhl. He directed the music video for "Red Lips" by Sky Ferreira. He also makes a cameo appearance in Thirty Seconds to Mars's video for "Hurricane".

The music video for "Oldie" by Odd Future was recorded during a photoshoot with Richardson and was published on March 20, 2012. Richardson can be seen in the video snapping photos of the collective while they party and play in front of a large white backdrop. On August 29, 2013, he directed Beyoncé in a music video at Coney Island for her single "XO". He also directed "Wrecking Ball" by Miley Cyrus. In late 2013 Richardson did the treatment on the music video for "Do What U Want" by Lady Gaga and R. Kelly from her third studio album titled Artpop, but the film was never released. On August 21, 2017, Richardson directed the Anitta music video, "Vai Malandra", at Vidigal, Rio de Janeiro.

=== Style ===
There are several repeating themes in Richardson's work, notably that of putting high-profile celebrities in mundane situations and photographing them using traditionally pedestrian methods, such as the use of an instant camera. His work also explores ideas of sexuality, with many of the pieces featured in his books Kibosh and Terryworld depicting full-frontal nudity and both simulated and actual sexual acts. Initially, many of Richardson's subjects were shot before a white background but he eventually expanded to other backdrops.

He is known for posing with his subjects, often giving them his trademark glasses so they may "pretend to be him" or, in the case of actress Chloë Sevigny, posing them in makeup and costume so that they look like him. Richardson counts Larry Clark, Nan Goldin, Diane Arbus and Robert Frank as early influences on his artistic style. His work has been praised by Helmut Newton.

Richardson described his style as, "Trying to capture those unpremeditated moments when people's sexualities come up to the surface."

Richardson is also known for his nonsexual portraiture. He has taken portraits of a wide variety of celebrities and politicians.

== Personal life ==
=== Relationships and family ===
Richardson was married to model Nikki Uberti from 1996 to 1999. Richardson dated political staffer and businesswoman Audrey Gelman from 2011 until 2013.

He started dating his long-time photography assistant, Alexandra "Skinny" Bolotow in 2014. On March 19, 2016, Bolotow gave birth to twin boys. He has said it was "the most intense, inspiring, exhilerating [sic], and humbling experience of my life." The couple married in 2017 in Taos, New Mexico.

He currently resides in Bearsville, New York.

=== Philanthropy ===
In 2010, Richardson became involved with RxArt, a charity that donates art to children's hospitals.

== Sexual misconduct allegations ==
Since 2001, Richardson has been accused multiple times of using his influence in the fashion industry to sexually exploit models during photo shoots, including coercing them to engage in sexual acts with him.

Models with whom he has worked (including Rie Rasmussen, Caron Bernstein, and Jamie Peck) have accused Richardson of sexual misconduct, including exploitation.

In a 2010 interview at French Institute Alliance Française, Marc Jacobs said that Richardson is "not ill-spirited". Richardson published a letter in 2014 in The Huffington Post defending himself against the accusations. Richardson said that the allegations are false and that he considers himself "considerate and respectful" of his photography subjects. Models including Noot Seear, Daisy Lowe, and Charlotte Free have defended him.

In 2017, due to the allegations of Richardson's sexual misconduct, many fashion brands and fashion magazines decided to no longer commission his work, including Valentino, Bulgari, and the Condé Nast magazines Vogue, Glamour, Wired, Vanity Fair, and GQ. Following the professional repercussions, he has not actively worked since 2018.

== Publications ==
- (1998) Hysteric Glamour. Hysteric Glamour (Tokyo). OCLC 86068704.
- (1999) Son of Bob. Little More (Tokyo). ISBN 978-4-947648-87-7.
- (2000) Terry Richardson – Feared by Men, Desired by Women. Shine Gallery (London). ISBN 978-0-9538451-1-8.
- (2002) Too Much. Sisley (Italy).
- (2004) Terry – The Terry Richardson Purple Book. Purple Institute (Paris). OCLC 62146661.
- (2004) Terry Richardson. Stern Gruner + Jahr (Hamburg). ISBN 978-3-570-19443-0.
- (2004) Terryworld. By Dian Hanson. Taschen (Hong Kong; Los Angeles). ISBN 978-3-8365-0191-0.
- (2006) Kibosh. Damiani Editore (Bologna). ISBN 978-88-89431-30-6.
- (2006) Manimal. Hysteric Glamour (Tokyo).
- (2007) Rio, Cidade Maravilhosa. Diesel/Vintage Denin (Brazil).
- (2011) Hong Kong. Diesel (Hong Kong).
- (2011) Mom & Dad. Mörel Books (London).
- (2011) Lady Gaga x Terry Richardson. Grand Central Publishing (New York City). ISBN 978-1-4555-1389-5.
- (2016) Skinny. Idea Books (London).
