= Voluspa (album) =

Studio album by The Golden Filter
- Released: April 26, 2010
- Recorded: 2009–10
- Genre: Electropop; synthpop; nu-disco; indietronica
- Length: 61:03
- Label: Brille
- Producer: The Golden Filter

The Golden Filter chronology
Voluspa (2010)	Syndromes (2011)

Singles from Voluspa
- 1. "Solid Gold" Released: February 5, 2009; 2. "Thunderbird" Released: November 16, 2009; 3. "Hide Me" Released: April 19, 2010

Voluspa is the debut album by American electronic duo The Golden Filter, released in the United Kingdom on April 26, 2010, by Brille Records. Two singles, "Solid Gold" and "Thunderbird", were released in 2009, while a third single, "Hide Me", was released on April 19, 2010.

== Critical reception ==
Professional ratings
Review scores
Source	Rating
Allmusic	3.5/5 stars
Contactmusic.com	(Mixed)
Drowned in Sound	6/10
The Fly	4/5
NME	7/10
Pitchfork	5.8/10
PopMatters	7/10
Resident Advisor	3.5/5
State	4/5 stars
UR Chicago	(Favorable)

Voluspa received generally positive reviews from music critics. The Fly praised its "motorik futurism, breathy provocativeness, and pogo glowstickerry" and called it "a precious debut". State felt that the record stands "on the edge of chart-friendly pop and the darker shades of progressive disco" and described it as "a trajectory of icy sharp and mesmeric nu-disco classics from beginning to end". PopMatters found it "full of character and personality" and noticed that "at its peak, it's bewitching, hypnotic and sexy enough to put steam in your strides". Resident Advisor described it as "one of those rare dance music albums that actually feels more comfortable listened to at home, by yourself, in a romantic yet solitary mood" and UR Chicago felt that it is "reveling in emotional abundance and wallowing in coarse electronics that even Olof Dreijer of The Knife would be jealous of" and that it is "easily a contender for one of the best [records] of the year".

NME praised the band for making "disco so sexy and sultry that it almost makes you sticky", but criticized the album for rarely straying from "its glitzy formula". Drowned in Sound complimented the album for maintaining "a sense of cohesion throughout", but felt that this was done "at the expense of maintaining the listener's interest". Pitchfork Media described it as "pleasant listening", but noticed that "when left to their own devices", the duo has "difficulty providing their songs with an actual structure". Contactmusic.com said that the album is "by no means offensive", but felt that "its vagueness falls a little flat and lacking the vibrancy borne out of experimentation" and concluded by stating that "The Golden Filter seem unable to grasp their own".

== Track listing ==
All tracks are written by The Golden Filter, except where noted.

No.	Title	Length
1.	"Dance Around the Fire"	4:24
2.	"Hide Me"	3:51
3.	"Look Me in the Eye"	4:31
4.	"Moonlight Fantasy"	4:27
5.	"Solid Gold"	5:28
6.	"The Underdogs"	4:23
7.	"Stardust"	6:40
8.	"Freyja's Ghost"	4:37
9.	"Kiss Her Goodbye"	1:39
10.	"Nerida's Gone"	3:16
11.	"Thunderbird"	5:22
12.	"Here We Go Again" (hidden track on CD and LP)	9:25

LP bonus track/European and Australian iTunes bonus track
No.	Title	Writer(s)	Length
12.	"The Hardest Button to Button"	Jack White	3:35

Bonus tracks on copies purchased on The Golden Filter's official webstore
No.	Title	Length
12.	"Longest Night of the Year"	4:26
13.	"Tiny Life"	1:57
