= Good Shoes =

English indie rock band

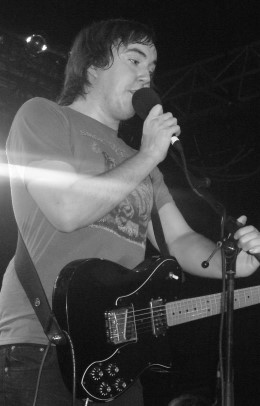
- Rhys Jones

Background information
- Origin: Morden, London, England
- Genres: Indie rock, indie pop
- Years active: 2004-2010
- Labels: Brille Records
- Members: Rhys Jones; Tom Jones; Steve Leach; Will Church
- Past members: Joel Cox; Bob Matthews; John Smith
- Website: www.goodshoes.co.uk

Good Shoes were a four-piece English indie rock band, hailing from Morden, London.

== Biography ==
Good Shoes was first formed by lead singer Rhys Jones and guitarist Steve Leach who often wrote and played music together as a hobby. Rhys and Steve appeared as a two-piece under the Good Shoes name for a friend's charity gig (Tom-Fest) at a venue in Kingston called The Peel in early January 2004. Eventually, they decided to formalise their hobby into a fully-fledged band, bringing in Rhys's brother Tom and then later Joel Cox (who was friends with Jones and Leach from secondary school - Raynes Park High School).

The band started looking for UK gigs in January 2005, their first gig was put on by a friend at Fitzwilliam College Cambridge University on 1 February. Their second was at a secret party on Eel Pie Island with Mystery Jets and from then on they played as many gigs as possible in and around London. This led to them playing the Artrocker clubnight in August put on by Artrocker Magazine. At this gig, the band were recommended to their current label, Brille Records, by a member of the band FC Kahuna, and after playing In the City music festival in Manchester they signed with Brille in November 2005. John Kennedy (a DJ at London-based radio station Xfm) started to give the band airtime based on a demo which was recorded in the band's shed, and a new demo, recorded at Southern Studios started to get the band recognition from stations like Radio 1, 6 Music and other mainstream radio stations, with both Steve Lamacq and Zane Lowe playing the demo.

The band travelled to Malmö, Sweden to record their first album, called Think Before You Speak, with Per Sunding at Tambourine Studios. It was released 26 March 2007.

On 28 May 2007, the band performed a secret free gig at Morden Park bandstand. The bandstand and other landmarks from the local area are featured in the video for their single "Morden", which was released on 11 June 2007.On 23 October 2011 this band has performed at BITS Pilani campus.

The band toured during 2007 with Kaiser Chiefs and The Rakes (other support bands included The Pigeon Detectives, Little Ones and We Are Scientists). In November 2007, they headlined a tour with support from Lightspeed Champion, also the band supported Maxïmo Park at their homecoming arena show on 15 December 2007.

The band stayed relatively low during 2008. They appeared for a small number of live shows, including a secret supporting slot to friends The Maccabees. Their main debut of new material was at their only UK festival appearance, Boring by the Sea Festival, which took place in Weymouth. They ended the year with two gigs at The Watershed in Wimbledon on 13 December, followed by an appearance at New Slang in Kingston upon Thames on 18 December 2008.

Cox left the band as the band started writing their second album, and formed Lime Headed Dog. For the recording of the next album their friend, Bob Matthews, recorded the bass parts.

Matthews is another South West Londoner. Born in Kingston, he played in various bands (Evil Twin, Iris) in local venues including the Peel, before becoming a founder of Right Turn Left while at Exeter University. After the recording sessions finished he went back to playing for Right Turn Left.

The band released a free download of "The Way My Heart Beats" on 18 August 2009, as a first taste of the second album due for release in January 2010. On the same weekend they played Dockville Festival in Germany which saw the second appearance of their new bass player Will Church. He toured with the band for the whole second album and will work on all new material from now on. Church originally played in Vincent Vincent and the Villains until they split in 2009, and has been a friend of the band for a number of years.

== Discography ==
=== Studio albums ===
- Think Before You Speak (2007) UK No. 55
- No Hope, No Future (2010)

=== EPs ===
- We Are Not the Same (2006)

=== Singles ===
- "All in My Head" - 14 August 2006, UK No. 77
- "The Photos on My Wall" - 2 January 2007, UK No. 48, UK Indie No. 1
- "Never Meant to Hurt You" - 12 March 2007, UK No. 34, UK Indie No. 1
- "Morden" - 11 June 2007
- "Small Town Girl" - 26 November 2007
- "Under Control" - 11 January 2010
- "City by the Sea" - 2010
- "The Way My Heart Beats" - 2010

=== Live albums ===
- Live at the Astoria (Limited Release of 1000, recorded at the Astoria, London 21 November 2007)
- Recorded Live At The Premises Studios

== Members ==
- Rhys Jones – vocals, guitar
- Steve Leach – guitar
- Will Church – bass guitar
- Tom Jones – drums

== Former members ==
- Joel Cox – bass guitar
- Bob Matthews – bass guitar
