= Whirlwind Heat =

Three-piece band

- Origin: Grand Rapids, Michigan, United States
- Genres: Post-hardcore, indie rock, noise rock, dance-punk
- Years active: 1996–2006
- Labels: Brille Records, V2 Records, XL Records, Third Man Records, Sympathy for the Record Industry, Dim Mak Records (former)
- Members: David James Swanson; Steve Damstra; Brad Holland
- Website: www.whirlwindheat.com

Whirlwind Heat was a three-piece band from the city of Grand Rapids, Michigan. Although they are avid genre-hoppers, they are often categorized as indie rock.

== History ==
The band was formed in 1996 by synthesizer-player/vocalist David James Swanson, bassist Steve Damstra, and drummer Brad Holland, all sixteen years old at the time. The band's name originates from the cover art done by Raymond Pettibon for Sonic Youth's 1990 release Goo. They played their first show on March 17, 1997. In 1999 the group was joined by guitarist Jason Eberspeaker and released a 45, continuing to play gigs around Michigan.

One such gig was attended by Jack White of The White Stripes, who offered to record them. On June 20, 2000, the same day as the release of the White Stripes' album De Stijl, Whirlwind Heat recorded a handful of songs in White's attic studio. A single entitled "Glaxefusion" was released on Italy Records soon after, as well as a track on White's 2001 compilation, Sympathetic Sounds of Detroit released by Sympathy Records.

Eberspeaker soon left the band to follow a career in fine arts. In August 2002, over a brief four-day period, the remaining trio recorded what would be the debut album not only for the band, but for White's label collaboration with V2 Records, Third Man Records. (White also produced the album.) The album, Do Rabbits Wonder?, was released on Third Man Records with distribution by V2 Records and XL Recordings on April 15, 2003, as well as later releasing a cover of the White Stripes song "You're Pretty Good Looking" for the soundtrack of The Hot Chick. The music video for the single "Purple" was shot by fashion/celebrity photographer Terry Richardson in New Paltz, NY. The video featured models Susan Eldridge and Kemp Muhl.

In 2004 the band released a short EP entitled Flamingo Honey, written and recorded in five hours. The EP features ten songs, all approximately one minute in length.

The band's second full-length album Types of Wood was released on April 24, 2006, in the UK by Brille Records. The album photos of model Susan Eldridge were shot by Terry Richardson . Types of Wood has 11 tracks including the singles Reagan which also features on the Reagan EP. Along with the release of the album, the band filmed a video for each song. The video for Reagan was directed by Matthew Gray Gubler who cast his younger brother in the video as a fourth member of the band.

Whirlwind Heat's last live performance was at Summer Sonic Festival in Tokyo, Japan on August 13, 2006.

In 2007 Whirlwind Heat collaborated with Devonte Hynes (of the now defunct Test Icicles, Lightspeed Champion, and currently Blood Orange) and called the project Lightspeed Heat.

The band self-released Self Titled or Scoop Du Jour on July 4, 2008, under their own record label imprint Heat Enterprises. The artwork was screen-printed in black ink on a sticker and applied to a blank white LP sleeve. The ice cream in the design was then colored green with a marker. The model on the cover is Erin Wasson and was photographed by Terry Richardson. Illustrations of the band members and art were done by actor/director/artist Matthew Gray Gubler.

On April 19, 2014 Record Store Day, Whirlwind Heat performed in the blue room at Third Man Records in Nashville, TN. The first time on stage since playing in 2006 at Summer Sonic Festival in Tokyo, Japan. It was likely their last performance. Their debut album, Do Rabbits Wonder? was reissued, in a variety of colored vinyl. Jack White performed at 10am this day, creating the world's fastest record. Whirlwind Heat performed at 2pm.

== Discography ==
=== Albums ===
- Do Rabbits Wonder? (2003) V2/Third Man/XL Recordings
- Types of Wood (2006) Brille Records
- I Fucked Up Types of Wood (2006) Brille Records
- Self Titled or Scoop Du Jour (2008)

=== EPs ===
- Flamingo Honey (2004) Dim Mak/XL Recordings
- Reagan (2006) Brille Records
- Air Miami (2006) Brille Records

=== Singles ===
- "Spyboys Experiment" - Offsite Records - 2000
- "Glaxefusion" - Italy Records - 2000
- 7" Split - "Stunning Evaseev" - New Beat Recordings - 2001
- "Purple" - Third Man/XL Recordings - 2003
- "Orange" - Third Man/XL Recordings - 2003
- "Pink" - Third Man/XL Recordings - 2004

=== Soundtracks ===
- "The Hot Chick Soundtrack" Cover of The White Stripes "You're Pretty Good Looking" - Hollywood Records - 2002
