= Lady Gaga x Terry Richardson =

Book by Lady Gaga and Terry Richardson

- Author: Lady Gaga; Terry Richardson
- Cover artist: Terry Richardson
- Genre: Photography
- Publisher: Grand Central Publishing
- Publication date: November 22, 2011
- Publication place: United States
- Media type: Print (hardcover)
- Pages: 360
- ISBN: 978-1-4555-1389-5

Lady Gaga x Terry Richardson is a photo-book by American singer Lady Gaga and American photographer Terry Richardson, released on November 22, 2011, by Grand Central Publishing. The book features more than 350 pictures of Gaga as taken by Richardson during a ten-month period from Gaga's performance at The Monster Ball Tour until the 2011 Grammy Awards. In addition to photographs, it includes a foreword written by the singer about her relationship with Richardson. The duo had already collaborated on other projects prior to the book.

Upon release, Lady Gaga x Terry Richardson received positive reviews from critics, who praised both the provocative pictures as well as simpler shots of Gaga without makeup and stage costumes. The book appeared at number five on The New York Times Best Seller list, before fluctuating down the ranking in subsequent weeks. Due to a lawsuit against Gaga by her former assistant, in 2013 the photos taken by Richardson were asked to be submitted as evidence for the case.

== Background and inspiration ==
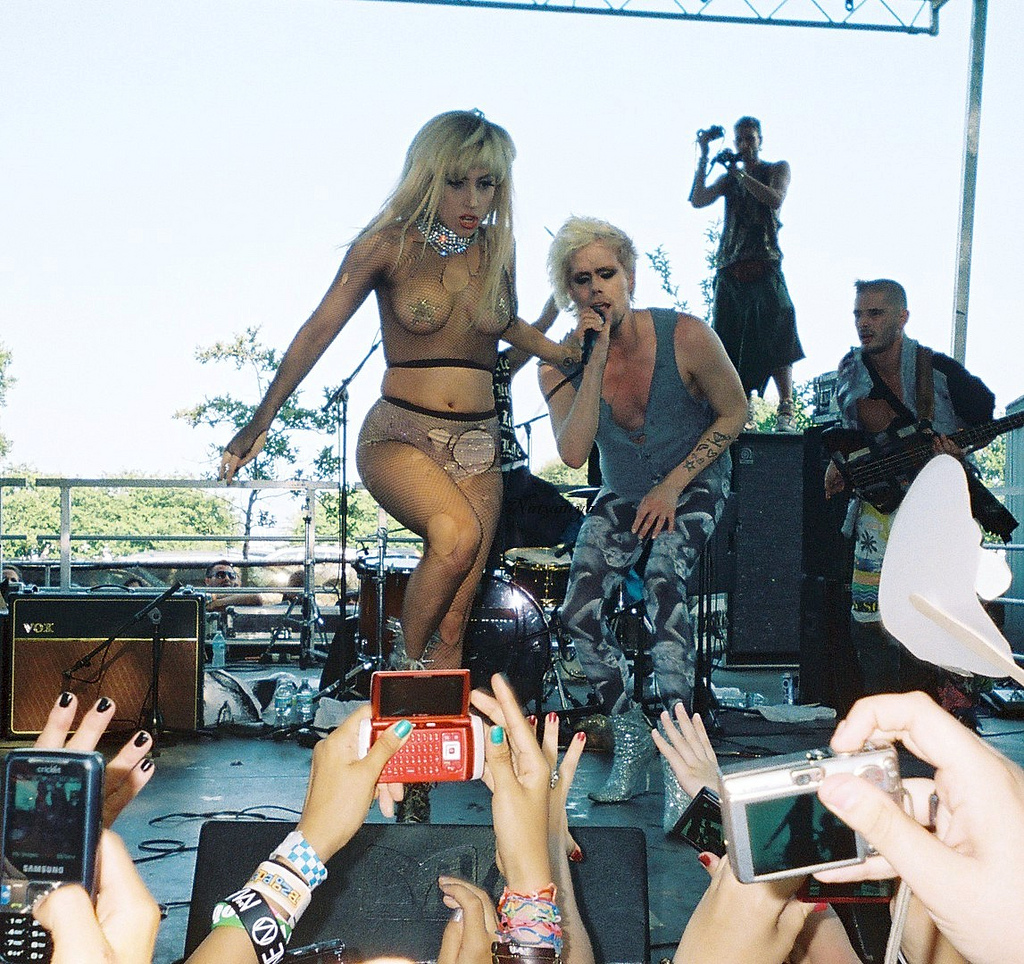
Lady Gaga x Terry Richardson includes pictures from Gaga's 2010 performance at Lollapalooza.

Lady Gaga x Terry Richardson consists of photos (in black-and-white and in color) that Richardson took of Gaga during a ten-month period, ranging from the singer's performance at Lollapalooza in 2010 to the final shows of her 2009–11 Monster Ball Tour. More than 100,000 pictures were taken during the time period with over 350 appearing in the book. The book also includes a Gaga-written foreword about her relationship with Richardson that doubles as an examination of self. "With Terry, the relationship extends beyond the photograph, and if you're lucky, he will teach you something truly profound about yourself."

Prior to the shooting of Lady Gaga x Terry Richardson, Gaga and Richardson had worked together on several projects. These include an advertisement for New York skate shop and clothing brand Supreme and photoshoots for Vogue Hommes Japan and Harper's Bazaar. Jamie Raab (executive vice president of Grand Central Publishing) said "We are proud to be publishing this remarkable collaboration between Lady Gaga and Terry Richardson and anticipate that it will be one of the most stunning, provocative and coveted books of the 2011 holiday season."

Gaga claimed that she held nothing back from Richardson, who was with her "every minute, every moment" during the photographing period. She explained that the images were completely unfiltered and he shot her waking up in the morning, doing her chores, as well as images taken while she got ready in her bathroom. She added that true to Richardson's photographing style, nothing in the book was staged and he was able to make her do things in front of the camera that has not been done by anyone previously. Richardson also took pictures of Gaga's fans for the book – which she appreciated – explaining to The Hollywood Reporter:

"My favorite thing, honestly, is that [Richardson] loved the fans. He shot the fans the same way he shot me: with no pretense. No 'Well, she's put out records and they haven't.' None of that. The music was all of ours... He would come backstage and he would say, 'Oh my God, the fans!' And I'd say, 'I Know... I know what you just photographed'. And he'd say, 'Baby, wow!' And then he'd film me, like, peeing in a cup and, like, ridiculous things."

== Release and reception ==
"Terry finds beauty in the most intricate and unassuming of places. His photography beckons the question over and over again. Should there ever be limitations in art? Because when he captures me in a moment of such tandem artistic and human purity, I am convinced the answer is that we must push the boundaries of culture through love and acceptance."

— Gaga talking about the book and its inspiration.

Gaga posted a video of herself reading the foreword of the book aloud on her YouTube account days before the book's release. On November 22, 2011, a book party was held at the New Museum of Contemporary Art in New York where Gaga attended for book signings. Lady Gaga x Terry Richardson debuted on The New York Times Best Seller list at number five among hardcover advice/miscellaneous books for the week ending November 26, 2011. It fell to number fourteen in its second week and remained there for its third week before rising to number eleven in its fourth week. It reentered the top ten in its fifth week at number nine and rose to number six the following week. The book's publishing rights for the United Kingdom were brought from Grand Central Publishing by Hodder & Stoughton (an imprint of Hachette UK).

The book received positive reviews from critics. New York magazine's James Lim wrote that while Gaga's magazine covers were showing the singer in more modest poses, the book showed the "wild, funky, creative Gaga that we all know and love". Liesl Bradner of the Los Angeles Times expressed surprise at seeing Gaga without her makeup and stage costumes. "It's when the singer takes a moment from the madness, pulls back her hair and ditches the costumes, that we see the real girl who is the mastermind behind the monster," Bradner wrote, adding that the release would be special for the fans. Eden Carter Wood of Diva magazine shared the same thought with Bradner and added that the book contained nice portraits of the artist. Arthur House from The Daily Telegraph was positive in his review, while finding the pictures to be glossy and enjoyable. Toronto Star's David Graham compared the book to Madonna's similar styled book called Sex (released in 1992). However, he found a "distinct lack of fanfare surrounding the book". Lady Gaga x Terry Richardson, according to Graham could not generate the same amount of "shock and awe that erupted when Madonna came out with Sex". However he still believed that there were "outrageous — even disturbing — photographs" of Gaga.

== Lawsuit ==
In June 2013, the pictures for the book and of Gaga, taken during the Monster Ball tour were introduced in the middle of a lawsuit. Gaga's former assistant Jennifer O'Neil had filed a case against the singer for overtime money owed to her by Gaga's management but never paid. As evidence for her case, O'Neil requested for the photos taken by Richardson to be presented to the court, intending to prove her "crazy" schedule while on tour with the singer and that O'Neil was working "around the clock." A Manhattan Federal Court judge ordered the photographer to submit over 142,000 images, but Richardson dismissed the request. He said that the request was a "harassment" for him and the documents asked to be submitted in the subpoena were "irrelevant" in lieu of the actual case. Judge Paul G. Gardephe noted in the court that "Mr. Richardson hasn't demonstrated to [the court] that there is any significant burden in producing the photographs." Writing for Complex magazine, Gregory Babcock analyzed that Richardson—who made a yearly gross of $58 million from his job—would lose money if he cooperated in the case. He reasoned that if the 142,000 images were deemed as evidence for the case, then (as per US laws) they would enter the public record. Hence his work would be deemed free and devoid of any copyright, thus leading to attribution and reproduction by anyone. The New York Post reported in October 2013 that Richardson lost his appeal which caused his lawyer to comment that it was "immeasurable financial loss" for the photographer.
