= Brille Records =

UK record label

Brille Records is an independent record label based in the UK, which has released work from bands including Whirlwind Heat, Good Shoes, Envelopes, Operator Please, The Bridge Gang, The Golden Filter, Gwilym Gold, Amateur Best, Casimer&Casimir and The Knife. It was in partnership with EMI Records UK from August 2005 until February 2008. Since 2011 it has been a part of the Cooperative Music group of labels. It is also a sister company to Dummy music website and music publisher Psychotic Reaction Music. It was started in 2004 by Leo Silverman, who was previously Head of A&R at XL Recordings and also created Rex Records.

== Releases ==
=== Albums ===
Release	Band	Title	Date
BRILCD/LP101	Envelopes	Demon	September 2004
BRILCD/LP102	Whirlwind Heat	Types of Wood	March 2005
BRILCD/LP103	The Knife	Silent Shout	20 March 2006
BRILCD103DLX	The Knife	Silent Shout – An Audio Visual Experience	2 July 2007
BRILCD/LP105	The Knife	Deep Cuts	28 August 2006
BRILCD/LP106	The Knife	The Knife	28 August 2006
BRILCD107	Envelopes	Here Comes The Wind	
BRILCD/LP108	Good Shoes	Think Before You Speak	
BRILCD111	Operator Please	Yes Yes Vindictive	3 March 2008
BRILCD112	Lucas Renney	Strange Glory	1 August 2009
BRILCD/LP113	Good Shoes	No Hope No Future	26 January 2010
BRILCD114	Operator Please	Gloves	31 March 2010
BRILCD/LP115	The Golden Filter	Voluspa	26 April 2010
BRILCD116	The Knife in collaboration with Mt Sims and Planningtorock	Tomorrow, In A Year	8 March 2010
BRILCD/LP117	The Knife	Shaking The Habitual	8 April 2013
BRILCD/LP118	The Knife	Shaken-Up Versions	8 December 2014
BRILCD/LP/DB119	Gwilym Gold	A Paradise	19 June 2015
BRILCD/LP/DB120	Amateur Best	The Gleaners	2 October 2015

== See also ==
- List of record labels
