= Fields (album) =

Studio album by Junip
- Released: 13 September 2010
- Genres: Indie rock, pop
- Length: 46:49
- Label: Mute
- Producers: Don Alstherberg, Junip

Junip chronology
Fields (2010)	Junip (2013)

Fields is the debut studio album by Swedish indie rock band Junip.

== Critical reception ==
Professional ratings
Aggregate scores
Source	Rating
Metacritic	(75/100)
Review scores
Source	Rating
AllMusic	3.5/5 stars
American Songwriter	4/5 stars
Consequence of Sound	2.5/5 stars
Daily News	4/5 stars
The Guardian	4/5 stars
musicOMH	3/5 stars
Now	4/5 stars
Rolling Stone	3.5/5 stars
URB	4.5/5 stars

Fields received mostly positive reviews from music critics. At Metacritic, which assigns a weighted average score out of 100 to reviews from mainstream critics, the album received a metascore of 75, based on 17 reviews. URB found that "the record is consistent and avoids becoming boring and repetitive", and that the album "is all about quality over quantity." At American Songwriter, Davis Inman vowed that "Fields unfolds in a whole new light." Jim Farber of Daily News commented that the release "has a touch of the otherworldly, offering the kind of glowing sound you could float away on" that he called "smart, gorgeous and sublimely sexy." At The Guardian, Caroline Sullivan highlighted that "this is an album to savour when autumn leaves are falling – and through the rest of the year, too." Kevin Ritchie of Now called the album a "heady, satisfying listen" that is a release that "is a headphones record that reveals new depth with every listen." Heather Phares of AllMusic found the release to be "intriguing in a low-key way that grows with repeated listening". At Rolling Stone, Will Hermes evoked that the album "is seductive, especially his covers", and affirmed that "the grooves are all about losing yourself."

QRO Magazines Ted Chase rated the album an 8/10, and wrote the album goes for a "more for a singular, magical, natural style", and it is "tranquil and touching, but also still with the air of loss". Amy Granzin of Pitchfork rated the album a 7.5/10, and told that the release has a "dearth of surprises makes it a little disappointing even for those with more conventional tastes-- listeners who generally value stuff like quality and consistency more than the shock of the new." Anna Wilson of Clash rated the album a 7/10, and called the album an "earthy, enigmatic and possessed of a refreshing lightness of touch." At Loud and Quiet, Danielle Goldstein rated that album a 7/10, and found that without the break the album "may not have given them time to hone these deep and intricate stylings." At Spin, Josh Modell rated the album 7 out of 10, and called the album "hushed, pretty, acoustic, melancholy", which he noted "it's just as exhilarating as his gorgeous solo work" because the release contains some "folkie's songs breathe and groove like never before." The A.V. Club's Noel Murray graded the album a B, and found the album to be "a more polished effort that fills out Junip’s sound, adding electronic enhancements and trippy trappings", yet the artist "rarely writes full, indelible songs, but he’s great at building enticing fragments into lasting moments."

However, Consequence of Sound's Drew Litowitz alluded to how "there's just something, if not a few things, missing from this music", and this is because "Fields is bursting with skittish rhythm and pretty strums, it feels horribly monotonous." David Welsh of musicOMH stated that due to the "dark acoustica" aspects to their music that the listener will be on a journey that "eventually wears a little thin." PopMatters' Matthew Fiander rated the album a 6/10, and said that "it’s hard not to see Fields as another solid entry in Jose Gonzalez’s discography, and a fitting next step in a lot of ways." At NME, Emily Mackay rated the album a 5/10, noted "that surprising lack of offensiveness, though, isn't replaced with anything to particularly excite, leaving it a tasteful aural curtain of an album without much of a view beyond.

== Track listing ==
All tracks written by Junip

No.	Title	Length
1.	"In Every Direction"	3:06
2.	"Always"	3:37
3.	"Rope & Summit"	5:20
4.	"Without You"	5:30
5.	"It's Alright"	3:27
6.	"Howl"	3:35
7.	"Sweet & Bitter"	3:35
8.	"Don't Let It Pass"	3:57
9.	"Off Point"	3:41
10.	"To the Grain"	4:10
11.	"Tide"	6:51

== Limited edition ==
A 3-disc limited edition was also released.

=== Disc 2: Rope & Summit EP ===
No.	Title	Length
1.	"Rope & Summit"	5:26
2.	"Far Away"	2:44
3.	"At the Doors"	8:18
4.	"Loops"	5:06
5.	"Chickens"	5:08
6.	"Azaleadalen"	3:26

The first four songs were originally released on the Rope & Summit EP, while the latter two were previously unreleased.

=== Disc 3: Black Refuge EP ===
No.	Title	Writer(s)	Length
1.	"Black Refuge"		3:25
2.	"Turn to the Assassin"		3:36
3.	"Official"		6:02
4.	"Chugga-Chugga"		1:54
5.	"The Ghost of Tom Joad"	Bruce Springsteen	4:11

== Personnel ==
- Junip:
  - José González - guitar, vocals, production
  - Elias Araya - drums, production
  - Tobias Winterkorn - keys, synths, production
- Erik Bodin - tambourine (1)
- Joel Westberg - percussion (2)
- Don Alstherberg - bass (2,4,11), production, recording, mixing, mastering
- Hans Olsson - mastering
