= Heartbeats (song) =

2002 single by the Knife

Single by the Knife

from the album Deep Cuts
- Released: 27 December 2002 (original release); 4 October 2004 (re-release)
- Genre: Techno; electronica; electropop; synth-pop
- Length: 3:51
- Label: Rabid; V2
- Songwriters: Karin Dreijer; Olof Dreijer
- Producers: Karin Dreijer; Olof Dreijer

The Knife singles chronology
"Nedsvärtning" (2002)	"Heartbeats" (2002)	"You Take My Breath Away" (2003)

Music video
- "Heartbeats" on YouTube

"Heartbeats" is a song by Swedish electronic music duo the Knife. It was released in Sweden on 27 December 2002 as the lead single from their second studio album Deep Cuts (2003) and re-released on 4 October 2004.

The song was listed at number 15 on Pitchfork Media's top 500 songs of the 2000s and at number 87 on Rolling Stone's top 100 songs of the 2000s. In October 2011, NME placed it at number 95 on its list "150 Best Tracks of the Past 15 Years". Adjectives used to describe the music were "haunting" and "electro". In Robert Dimery's book 1001 Songs: You Must Hear Before You Die, it was said: "The Stockholm siblings' love of synth pop, minimal beats and electronica create together a moving masterpiece. Singer Karin Dreijer's hypnotic vocals recall both Björk and Siouxsie Sioux with [Dreijer's] icy delivery of magical lines".

The song has been covered by many acts such as José González, Royal Teeth, Scala & Kolacny Brothers, Amason and Ellie Goulding.

== Critical reception ==
The song has received critical acclaim since its release. MusicOMH said that the song's "emotive lyrics merge with forward thinking production to create one of the most exciting electronica releases of the year", and Contactmusic.com stated the song had "clever synth beats and Björkesque vocals" with the ability to "instil some fun and nostalgia into music." Gigwise.com said that the song was "perhaps one of the most hypnotic and haunting electronic songs of recent times, [...] innately infectious from the outset." Several reviews commented that the song had a 1980s feel.

== Track listings ==
- UK CD
1. "Heartbeats" (original) – 3:53
2. "Heartbeats" (Rex the Dog remix) – 6:12
3. "Heartbeats" (The Knife techno remix) – 2:47
4. "Afraid of You" – 3:48
- UK 12-inch vinyl
1. "Heartbeats" (original) – 3:53
2. "Heartbeats" (Style of Eye remix) –
3. "Heartbeats" (Rex the Dog remix) – 6:12
4. "Heartbeats" (The Knife techno remix) – 2:47

== Personnel ==
- Christoffer Berg – mixing
- Rex the Dog – re-mixing, producer
- Linus Eklow – re-mixing

== Charts ==
Chart (2003–2010)	Peak position
Sweden (Sverigetopplistan)	26
UK Singles (OCC)	119

== José González version ==
"Heartbeats"

Single by José González

from the album Veneer
- Released: 9 January 2006
- Length: 2:40
- Label: Peacefrog; Imperial
- Songwriters: Karin Dreijer; Olof Dreijer
- Producer: José González

José González singles chronology
"Heartbeats" (2006)	"Crosses" (2006)

Argentine-Swedish singer-songwriter José González covered "Heartbeats" for his debut studio album, Veneer (2003), and released as its lead single in January 2006. In contrast to the electronic, synth-based original, González's cover features only an acoustic classical guitar. The song peaked at number nine on the UK Singles Chart following its use in an advertisement for the Sony Bravia television in November 2005, in which countless colourful balls bounce down the streets of Russian Hill in San Francisco.

=== Charts ===
==== Weekly charts ====
Chart (2006)	Peak position
Australia (ARIA)	45
Belgium (Ultratop 50 Flanders)	20
Belgium (Ultratip Bubbling Under Wallonia)	13
Ireland (IRMA)	12
Netherlands (Single Top 100)	56
Scottish Singles Sales (Official Charts)	6
UK Singles (Official Charts)	9
UK Independent (Official Charts)	3

==== Year-end charts ====
Chart (2006)	Position
UK Singles (OCC)	72

=== Certifications ===
Region	Certification	Certified units/sales
Denmark (IFPI Danmark)	Platinum	90,000^{‡}
Italy (FIMI) Sales since 2009	Gold	25,000^{‡}
New Zealand (RMNZ)	2× Platinum	60,000^{‡}
United Kingdom (BPI)	2× Platinum	1,200,000^{‡}
^{‡} Sales+streaming figures based on certification alone.

=== Release history ===
Region	Date	Format(s)	Label(s)	Ref.
United Kingdom	9 January 2006	7-inch vinyl; CD; DVD	Peacefrog; Imperial	
Australia	20 February 2006	CD	Shock; Imperial	
