= Local Valley =

Studio album by José González
- Released: 17 September 2021
- Studio: Studio Koltrast (Hakefjorden, Sweden); Studio Koltrast (Linné, Sweden)
- Genre: Folk, indie folk
- Length: 41:55
- Label: City Slang; Mute
- Producer: José González

José González chronology
Live in Europe (2019)	Local Valley (2021)

Singles from Local Valley
- 1. "El Invento" Released: 17 February 2021; 2. "Visions" Released: 14 April 2021; 3. "Head On" Released: 9 June 2021; 4. "Swing" Released: 18 August 2021

Local Valley is the fourth studio album by Swedish singer-songwriter José González, released on 17 September 2021 by City Slang and Mute Records.

It succeeds González's third studio album Vestiges and Claws, which was released in 2015, as well as the live album Live in Europe.

Four singles preceded Local Valley, including "El Invento", "Visions" "Head On", and "Swing".

== Background ==
Local Valley was recorded and produced by José González at Studio Koltrast in Hakefjorden and Studio Koltrast in Linné, Sweden. "Line of Fire" is a re-recording of the 2013 song of the same name by González's band, Junip.

== Critical reception ==
Professional ratings
Aggregate scores
Source	Rating
AnyDecentMusic?	7.3/10
Metacritic	76/100
Review scores
Source	Rating
AllMusic	4/5 stars
American Songwriter	4/5 stars
Clash	7/10
Gigwise	8/10
The Line of Best Fit	7/10
Mojo	3/5 stars
Pitchfork	6.6/10
PopMatters	7/10
Uncut	8/10
Under the Radar	8/10

Local Valley received positive reviews from music critics. At Metacritic, which assigns a normalized rating out of 100 to reviews from mainstream critics, the album received an average score of 76, based on 12 reviews, indicating "generally favorable reviews". Aggregator AnyDecentMusic? gave it 7.3 out of 10, based on their assessment of the critical consensus. In an 8/10 review, Sam Richards of Uncut wrote, "His always inventive finger- picking is more expansive and fluid, his vocals less vexed, his melodies more direct. As a result, [second track] "Visions" might be the best song he's written since his 2003 debut single "Crosses"." Victoria Segal of Mojo wrote, "Local Valley has no lows, nor any thrilling highs, but it's an even, easy pleasure from start to finish."

== Track listing ==
All tracks are written by José González, except where noted.

Local Valley track listing
No.	Title	Writer(s)	Length
1.	"El Invento"		2:33
2.	"Visions"		3:55
3.	"Void"		3:09
4.	"Horizons"		3:16
5.	"Head On"		4:45
6.	"Valle Local"		2:23
7.	"Lasso In"		3:47
8.	"Lilla G"		2:00
9.	"Swing"	José González; Hannele Fernström^{[a]}	3:33
10.	"Tjomme"		4:56
11.	"Line of Fire"	González; Tobias Winterkorn; Elias Araya	3:08
12.	"En Stund På Jorden"	Laleh Pourkarim	2:42
13.	"Honey Honey"	González; Stefan Kozalla	1:48
Total length:			41:55

Notes

- ^{^[a]} signifies an additional lyricist

== Charts ==
Chart performance for Local Valley
Chart (2021)	Peak position
Austrian Albums (Ö3 Austria)	41
Belgian Albums (Ultratop Flanders)	72
Belgian Albums (Ultratop Wallonia)	156
German Albums (Offizielle Top 100)	20
Portuguese Albums (AFP)	43
Scottish Albums (OCC)	25
Spanish Albums (PROMUSICAE)	77
Swedish Albums (Sverigetopplistan)	25
Swiss Albums (Schweizer Hitparade)	41
UK Independent Albums (OCC)	9
US Americana/Folk Albums (Billboard)	12
US Top Album Sales (Billboard)	29
