= Veneer (album) =

Studio album by José González
- Released: 29 October 2003
- Genres: Folk, indie rock
- Length: 30:50
- Label: Imperial
- Producer: José González

José González chronology
Veneer (2003)	In Our Nature (2007)

Professional ratings
Review scores
Source	Rating
AllMusic	4/5 stars
Entertainment Weekly	B+
Drowned in Sound	8/10
Gigwise	3.5/5 stars
The Irish Times	4/5 stars
MusicOMH	4/5 stars
Pitchfork	7.0/10
PopMatters	7/10
Spin	A−
Sputnikmusic	4.5/5

Veneer is the debut studio album by Swedish singer-songwriter José González. It was released on 29 October 2003, in Sweden, 25 April 2005 in the rest of Europe and on 6 September 2005 in the United States.

== Track listing ==
All tracks are written by José González, except where noted.

Veneer track listing
No.	Title	Writer(s)	Length
1.	"Slow Moves"		2:52
2.	"Remain"		3:45
3.	"Lovestain"		2:18
4.	"Heartbeats"	Karin Dreijer; Olof Dreijer	2:40
5.	"Crosses"		2:43
6.	"Deadweight on Velveteen"		3:27
7.	"All You Deliver"		2:20
8.	"Stay in the Shade"		2:23
9.	"Hints"		3:52
10.	"Save Your Day"		2:30
11.	"Broken Arrows"		1:58

=== Two-disc special edition ===
1. "Storm"
2. "Love Will Tear Us Apart" (Joy Division)
3. "Suggestions"
4. "Down the Hillside"
5. "Sensing Owls"
6. "Hand on Your Heart" (Kylie Minogue)
7. "Instrumental"

== Singles ==
- "Heartbeats" (9 January 2006)
  - b/w: "Suggestions"
- "Crosses" (10 April 2006)
  - b/w: "Storm"

== Personnel ==
- José González – vocals, guitars, percussion
- Stefan Sporsén – trumpet on "Broken Arrows"

== Charts ==
=== Weekly charts ===
Weekly chart performance for Veneer
Chart (2003–2006)	Peak position
Australian Albums (ARIA)	52
Belgian Albums (Ultratop Flanders)	28
Dutch Albums (Album Top 100)	46
Irish Albums (IRMA)	2
New Zealand Albums (RMNZ)	11
Scottish Albums (Official Charts)	3
Swedish Albums (Sverigetopplistan)	2
UK Albums (Official Charts)	7
UK Independent Albums (Official Charts)	1

=== Year-end charts ===
Year-end chart performance for Veneer
Chart	Year	Position
Swedish Albums (Sverigetopplistan)	2003	50
Swedish Albums (Sverigetopplistan)	2004	56
UK Albums (OCC)	2006	58

== Certifications and sales ==
Certifications and sales for Veneer
Region	Certification	Certified units/sales
Australia (ARIA)	Gold	35,000^{^}
New Zealand (RMNZ)	Gold	7,500^{^}
Sweden (GLF)	Platinum	60,000^{^}
United Kingdom (BPI)	Platinum	430,000
Summaries
Europe	—	250,000+
Worldwide	—N/a	1,000,000
^{^} Shipments figures based on certification alone.
