= Straight Lines =

Straight Lines may refer to:

- Straight line, in mathematical geometry
- Straight Lines (band), a Canadian pop-rock band
- Straight Lines (album), by Ken Vandermark
- Straight Lines (EP), by Junip
- "Straight Lines" (song), by Silverchair
- "Straight Lines", a song by New Musik from From A to B
- "Straight Lines", a song by Hayden Thorpe from Diviner

== See also ==
- No Straight Lines, an anthology by Justin Hall
