= Hannah med H Soundtrack =

Soundtrack album by The Knife
- Released: 23 November 2003
- Recorded: 2003
- Length: 38:00
- Label: Rabid
- Producer: The Knife

The Knife chronology
Deep Cuts (2003)	Hannah med H Soundtrack (2003)	Silent Shout (2006)

Singles from The Knife
- 1. "Handy-Man" Released: 12 November 2003

Hannah med H Soundtrack is the soundtrack to the 2003 Swedish drama film Hannah med H, recorded by the Swedish electropop duo The Knife. Made up mostly of instrumentals, the album was released in Sweden on 26 November 2003 by Rabid Records. Track 16 Listen Now was previously released on their 2003 album, Deep Cuts, which was being made at the same time. Some other tracks on it also appear as bonus tracks on the UK release of the duo's self-titled debut album, as well as on later releases of Deep Cuts.

== Track listing ==
All tracks are written by The Knife

No.	Title	Length
1.	"Real Life Television"	1:51
2.	"Hannah's Conscious"	3:41
3.	"Handy-Man"	2:38
4.	"High School Poem"	1:22
5.	"New Year's Eve"	4:04
6.	"Three Boys"	1:11
7.	"This Is Now"	3:53
8.	"The Bridge"	3:50
9.	"Copenhagen"	1:01
10.	"Wanting to Kill"	2:18
11.	"Jens's Sneaking"	1:16
12.	"Vegetarian Restaurant"	2:32
13.	"At the Café"	2:39
14.	"A Different Way"	1:14
15.	"Poetry by Night"	1:42
16.	"Listen Now"	2:48
Total length:		38:00

== Personnel ==
- The Knife – vocals, producers, engineering
- Christoffer Berg – mixing
- Joakim Strömholm – cover picture of Hannah (Tove Edfeldt)
- Bold Faces – cover design (alternative high-contrast cover)
- Henrik Jonsson – mastering

== Charts ==
Chart (2003)	Peak position
Swedish Albums Chart	51

== Release history ==
Country	Date	Label
Sweden	26 November 2003	Rabid Records
Germany	19 January 2007	V2 Records
