= Rabid Records =

Swedish record label

Rabid Records is a Swedish record label founded in 1998 by members of Honey Is Cool. Today the label is operated by Karin Dreijer and Olof Dreijer of the synthpop duo the Knife, as well as Frau Rabid. The label rarely releases anything other than works by the Knife, but it is currently the home of Jenny Wilson, First Aid Kit, and DJ Coolof (the stage name of Olof Dreijer). In the past, the label has put out albums and EPs by Honey Is Cool, Monster & Maskiner, Rockmonster, and Calle P.

== Catalogue ==
Catalogue Number	Artist	Title	Format	Date
RABID001	Honey Is Cool	Bolero EP	CD EP	April 26, 1999
RABID002	Honey Is Cool	There's No Difference	CD Single	August 2, 1999
RABID003	Honey Is Cool	Early Morning Are You Working?	CD Album	August 23, 1999
RABID004	Rockmonster	Rockmonster	CD Album	January 1, 2000
RABID005	Honey Is Cool	Baby Jane	CD EP	March 3, 2000
RABID006	The Knife	Afraid Of You	Vinyl 7"	August 14, 2000
RABID007	Monster & Maskiner	Monster & Maskiner	CD Album	September 4, 2000
RABID008	The Knife	The Knife	CD Album	February 5, 2001
RABID009	The Knife	N.Y. Hotel	CD Single	May 1, 2001
RABID010	The Knife	Got 2 Let U	CD Single	May 6, 2002
RABID011	Calle P	Det har	Vinyl 12"	May 27, 2002
RABID012	The Knife	Nedsvärtning	CD Single	September 25, 2002
RABID013	The Knife	"Heartbeats"	CD Single	December 27, 2002
RABID014	The Knife	Deep Cuts	CD Album	January 17, 2003
RABID015	The Knife	"You Take My Breath Away"	CD Single	March 28, 2003
RABID016	The Knife	Handy-Man	Vinyl 12"	November 12, 2003
RABID017	The Knife	Hannah med H Soundtrack	CD Single	November 26, 2003
RABID018	The Knife	The Knife 10"	Vinyl 10"	February 23, 2004
RABID019	The Knife	The Knife	CD Album	March 8, 2004
RABID020	The Knife	"Heartbeats"	CD Single	October 4, 2004
RABIDT020	The Knife	"Heartbeats"	Vinyl 12"	October 4, 2004
RABID021	The Knife	Deep Cuts	CD Album + DVD	October 11, 2004
RABID022	The Knife	Gender Bender EP	Vinyl 10"	December 13, 2004
RABIDCD023	The Knife	"You Take My Breath Away"	CD Single	February 28, 2005
RABIDT023	The Knife	"You Take My Breath Away"	Vinyl 12"	February 28, 2005
RABID024	Jenny Wilson	Summer Time - The Roughest Time	CD Single	March 18, 2005
RABID025	Jenny Wilson	Love And Youth	CD Album	April 6, 2005
RABID026	The Knife	"Pass This On"	Vinyl 12"	June 13, 2005
RABID027	The Knife	When I Found The Knife	CD	July 4, 2005
RABID028	Jenny Wilson	Let My Shoes Lead Me Forward	CD Album	
RABID029	The Knife	"Silent Shout"	CD Single	January 30, 2006
RABID030	The Knife	Silent Shout	CD + LP Album	February 17, 2006
RABID031	The Knife / José González	Heartbeats 7"	Vinyl 7"	April 5, 2006
RABID032	The Knife	Marble House (single)	CD + Vinyl 12"	May 15, 2006
RABID033	The Knife	We Share Our Mothers' Health (single)	CD + Vinyl 12"	May 15, 2006
RABID034	The Knife	Like A Pen (single)	CD + Vinyl 7"	September 27, 2006
RABID035	The Knife	Silent Shout: An Audio Visual Experience	DVD	November 1, 2006
RABID036	First Aid Kit	Drunken Trees EP	CD EP	April 9, 2008
RABID037	First Aid Kit	You're Not Coming Home Tonight	MP3	March 10, 2008
RABID038	Fever Ray	"If I Had A Heart"	MP3 + Vinyl 7"	December 15, 2008
RABID039	Fever Ray	Fever Ray	CD + MP3 Album	January 12, 2009
RABID040	Fever Ray	When I Grow Up (single)	CD + MP3 + Vinyl 12" Single	March 30, 2009
RABID041	Fever Ray	"Triangle Walks"	CD + MP3 + Vinyl 12" Single	July 20, 2009
RABID042T	Fever Ray with Van Rivers & the Subliminal Kid	"Triangle Walks"	CD + MP3 + Vinyl 12" Single	August, 2009
RABID043	Fever Ray	"Seven"	CD + MP3 + Vinyl 12" Single	October 5, 2009
RABID044	The Knife In Collaboration With Mt. Sims And Planningtorock	Tomorrow, In A Year	2 x CD Album	March 10, 2010
RABID045	The Knife In Collaboration With Mt. Sims And Planningtorock	Tomorrow, In A Year	2 x CD Album	March 10, 2010
RABID046	Fever Ray	"Mercy Street"	Vinyl 7" Single	August, 2010
RABID047	The Knife In Collaboration With Mt. Sims And Planningtorock	"Seeds"	Vinyl 7" Single	December 6, 2010
RABID048	The Knife	Shaking The Habitual	2 x CD + 3 x LP Album	April 8, 2013

== See also ==
- List of record labels
