= Vissel (disambiguation) =

Vissel may refer to:

- Vissel Kobe, Japanese football club.
- Vissel, a stream in northern Germany.
- "Vissel", a song from Jose González's 2015 album Vestiges & Claws
