= Bring the Lions Out =

Studio album by melpo mene
- Released: 2008
- Genre: Indie pop
- Label: Imperial Recordings

Melpo mene chronology
Holes (2004)	Bring the Lions Out (2008)

Bring the Lions Out, released on 1 July 2008, is the second album by indie pop band melpo mene. Produced by Imperial Recordings, two singles were released, "Snakes and Lions" and "I Adore You", the latter of which was used in a 2008 Volvo commercial.

== Track listing ==
1. "Hit the Boy" - 4:02
2. "Society" - 2:47
3. "Babes and Darlings" - 4:07
4. "I Adore You" - 4:07
5. "The Sun" - 3:18
6. "Eager To Find It" - 2:56
7. "Kling Klang Klock" - 4:24
8. "Snakes and Lions" - 3:25
9. "We Were Kids" - 4:12
10. "Jedi" - 4:22
11. "Under the Moon" - 4:38
12. "Dead On Arrival" - 3:42
