= Honey Is Cool =

Swedish indie rock band

- Origin: Gothenburg, Sweden
- Genres: Indie rock, alternative rock, noise rock
- Years active: 1994–2000
- Labels: Sunspot, MVG, Rabid
- Past members: Karin Dreijer; Anders Göthberg; Johan Hagström; Staffan Larsson; John Jern; Håkan Hellström; Paul Källman; Carl Larsson; Fredrik Wennerlund; Dan Lepp; Tina Weibull

Honey Is Cool were a Swedish indie rock band from Gothenburg, formed in 1994. The band's final line-up consisted of Karin Dreijer (vocals, guitar), John Jern (guitar), Staffan Larsson (bass), Tina Weibull (keyboards, synthesisers), and Fredrik Wennerlund (drums).

== History ==
'For the Sun' was one of the band's first songs, recorded in 1994, but never released commercially. A recording can be heard on Youtube. They recorded a demo and were signed by Sun Spot. Their first EP Focky Focky No Pay was released in 1996. The new drummer on the record was Håkan Hellström from Broder Daniel.

After the Focky Focky No Pay was well-received, Honey Is Cool signed on to MVG and released Crazy Love in 1997. This album also got very good reviews but was not a commercial success. Honey Is Cool's failure to sell and the record company's interference in the production of the next album led to the band quitting and setting up their own label, Rabid Records.

The band's line-up then changed, with Hellström returning to Broder Daniel, leaving a place for drummer Fredrik Wennerlund, and in 1999, keyboard player Carl Larsson left the band for Barusta, being replaced by Dan Lepp, who in turn was replaced by Tina Weibull. An EP in the Spring of 1999 was followed by the album Early Morning Are You Working?, which again received positive reviews but limited sales. The title track from the EP Baby Jane, being a Rod Stewart cover, quickly became a radio hit in 2000, but Honey Is Cool announced that they would take a break, since Dreijer was busy with their new project, The Knife, and Wennerlund with Rockmonster. The decisive factor in this was probably the absence of Dreijer, as they had fronted the band and been the main creative force.

Honey Is Cool disbanded on 3 July 2000, following an announcement on the Rabid Records website.

Lyrics from some Honey Is Cool songs re-emerge in songs on the 2003 album Deep Cuts by Karin Dreijer's subsequent band The Knife; Honey Is Cool's 1999 song 'Something Above The Mountains' had featured the lines "There is something above the mountains. There is something that I can't see." but in the Knife's 2003 song 'One For You' Karin sang "If we say that there is something above the mountains, if we say that there is something we can't see, promise you will never believe me, cos I guess I'm just trying to make it easy". The line "We raise our heads for the colour red" was also recycled in the song 'You Take My Breath Away'.

== Discography ==
Studio albums

- Crazy Love (1997)
- Early Morning Are You Working? (1999)

EPs

- Focky Focky No Pay (1995)
- Bolero! EP (1999)
- Baby Jane (2000)

Singles

- "Nach Heart" (1997)

== Personnel ==
- Karin Dreijer - vocals, guitar (1994–2000)
- Anders Göthberg - guitar (1994; died 2008)
- Johan Hagström - drums (1994–1995)
- Staffan Larsson - bass (1994–2000)
- John Jern - guitar (1994–2000)
- Håkan Hellström - drums (1995–1997)
- Paul Källman - keyboards, synthesisers (1995–1997)
- Carl Larsson - keyboards, synthesisers (1997–1999)
- Fredrik Wennerlund - drums (1997–2000)
- Dan Lepp - drums (1999)
- Tina Weibull - keyboards, synthesisers (1999–2000)
