= The Secret Life of Walter Mitty (soundtrack) =

Music for the 2013 American film

Two soundtracks were released for the Ben Stiller-directed 2013 drama film The Secret Life of Walter Mitty: an original soundtrack and an original score. Universal Republic Records and Brushfire Records released the original soundtrack, consisting of 12 songs, on December 17, 2013, while Theodore Shapiro's original score was released by Sony Classical Records on December 31, 2013.

== The Secret Life of Walter Mitty (Music from and Inspired by the Motion Picture) ==
The Secret Life of Walter Mitty (Music from and Inspired by the Motion Picture)

Soundtrack album by various artists
- Released: December 17, 2013
- Genre: Film soundtrack
- Length: 49:35
- Labels: Universal Republic; Brushfire
- Compiler: Ben Stiller

Singles from The Secret Life of Walter Mitty (Music from and Inspired by the Motion Picture)
- 1. "Step Out" Released: November 7, 2013; 2. "Stay Alive" Released: December 3, 2013; 3. "Far Away" Released: December 13, 2013

The album consisted of several songs performed by Jack Johnson, Junip, Bahamas, and Of Monsters and Men, amongst various others. It was a personal experience for the lead cast, as Ben Stiller curated the entire soundtrack, being deeply involved in the production of the album. Kristen Wiig also made her debut as a playback singer, performing David Bowie's "Space Oddity" that played a significant role throughout the film. The song is featured in the sequence where Mitty decides to leap into the helicopter as he imagines Cheryl (Wiig) singing the song. In an interview to Collider, he said:

"I felt like the way it fits into the story, we got to this point and this scene which was sort of how the fantasy and reality come together for Walter, and that was what that came out of. That song, and what he mentioned in his head, and what he imagines and what he does, it all just seemed to come together over that song."

Wiig also covered the song at the Electric Lady Studios which she called an "incredible and fun experience". She further recalled that, in her mind, she had recorded the song with Bowie at the studio. Johnson remade Rupert Holmes' 1979 song "Escape (The Piña Colada Song)", while Bahamas also covered Human League's 1981 single "Don't You Want Me". The film's trailer, which was released on September 16, 2013, is soundtracked by Monsters and Men's "Dirty Paws", which was also included in the album.

The album was released by Universal Republic Records and Brushfire Records on December 17, 2013, in digital and physical formats. Two original songs performed by José González, "Step Out" (written by Theodore Shapiro and Craig Warren) and "Stay Alive" (written by Ryan Adams), were released as singles on November 7 and December 3, respectively. Junip performed the cover version of "Far Away", which was released as a single on December 13.

=== Track listing ===
No.	Title	Artist(s)	Length
1.	"Step Out"	José González	4:01
2.	"Dirty Paws"	Of Monsters and Men	4:31
3.	"Stay Alive"	José González	4:26
4.	"Far Away"	Junip	2:42
5.	"Don't Let It Pass"	Junip	3:55
6.	"Lake Michigan"	Rogue Wave	3:46
7.	"Escape (The Piña Colada Song)"	Jack Johnson	4:02
8.	"Don't You Want Me"	Bahamas featuring The Weather Station	3:19
9.	"The Wolves & the Ravens"	Rogue Valley	4:11
10.	"Space Oddity (Mitty Mix)"	David Bowie featuring Kristen Wiig	5:11
11.	"#9 Dream"	José González	5:37
12.	"Maneater"	Grace Mitchell	3:54
Total length:			49:35

=== Reception ===
Janelle Tucknott, writing for Renowned for Sound, wrote, "Ben Stiller has done a fine choice in selecting some great songs which will hopefully fit the movie well. Space Oddity and Step Out are two of the album’s highest points, as well as the closer Maneater which will likely linger in your head for hours after listening to it." Joe Wilde of Contactmusic.com called it "a pleasant collection of songs that would serve well as a compilation of laid-back songs as well as it serves as a film soundtrack". David Rooney of The Hollywood Reporter wrote that Theodore Shapiro's score is "deftly augmented with symphonic indie alt-rock and beautiful vocal tracks by neo-folkie Jose Gonzalez, breathing epic scope into what’s at heart a small New York fairy tale."

=== Charts ===
==== Weekly charts ====
Chart (2014)	Peak position
Australian Albums (ARIA)	19
Austrian Albums (Ö3 Austria)	39
Belgian Albums (Ultratop Flanders)	148
Belgian Albums (Ultratop Wallonia)	106
German Albums (Offizielle Top 100)	63
Spanish Albums (Promusicae)	86
Swiss Albums (Schweizer Hitparade)	72
UK Compilation Albums (OCC)	52
UK Soundtrack Albums (OCC)	8
US Billboard 200	30
US Current Album Sales (Billboard)	30
US Soundtrack Albums (Billboard)	3

==== Year-end charts ====
Chart (2014)	Position
US Soundtrack Albums (Billboard)	19

== The Secret Life of Walter Mitty (Original Motion Picture Score) ==
The Secret Life of Walter Mitty (Music from and Inspired by the Motion Picture)

Soundtrack album by Theodore Shapiro
- Released: December 31, 2013
- Genre: Film score
- Length: 48:26
- Label: Sony Classical
- Producer: Theodore Shapiro

Theodore Shapiro chronology
One Chance (2013)	The Secret Life of Walter Mitty (2013)	St. Vincent (2014)

Theodore Shapiro composed the film's score in his second collaboration with Stiller, after Tropic Thunder (2008). The score was released by Sony Classical Records on December 31, 2013, a week after the film's release, and featured 27 tracks with a runtime of 48 minutes. A vinyl edition of the soundtrack was released on December 1, 2015.

=== Track listing ===
No.	Title	Length
1.	"Walter Time"	0:59
2.	"Building Rescue"	0:49
3.	"Time & Life"	2:14
4.	"Walter Sees Cheryl"	1:11
5.	"Arctic Fantasy"	0:36
6.	"Paperclip"	0:36
7.	"Wallet"	0:43
8.	"Clue #1"	0:46
9.	"Dangling Piano"	0:35
10.	"Clue #2"	0:59
11.	"Ted vs Walter"	1:23
12.	"Sixth Avenue"	2:08
13.	"Button"	1:28
14.	"The Beckoning"	1:48
15.	"Pub Decision"	0:53
16.	"Shark Attack"	3:51
17.	"Into The Harbor"	2:23
18.	"Eyjafjallajökull"	3:58
19.	"Eruption"	0:52
20.	"Cup Reminders"	4:43
21.	"Skateboard Delivery"	0:59
22.	"Conan Cab"	1:36
23.	"You Finish His Work"	2:31
24.	"Afghan Trek"	2:07
25.	"Quintessence"	3:57
26.	"I'm Right Here"	1:38
27.	"Stationary Cycle"	2:43
Total length:		48:26

=== Charts ===
Chart (2014)	Peak position
UK Soundtrack Albums (OCC)	32
