= You Take My Breath Away (The Knife song) =

Single by The Knife

from the album Deep Cuts
- Released: 2003
- Genre: Electropop
- Length: 4:28
- Label: Rabid Records
- Songwriter(s): Karin Dreijer; Olof Dreijer
- Producer(s): The Knife

The Knife singles chronology
"Heartbeats" (2002)	"You Take My Breath Away" (2003)	"Pass This On" (2003)

"You Take My Breath Away" is a single by Swedish electronic duo, The Knife, from their second studio album Deep Cuts, released in 2003. Jenny Wilson is the backup singer, singing the second verse and the chorus together with Karin Dreijer. "You Take My Breath Away" is the eighth song from the Deep Cuts album, and two different music videos were shot for the song.

== Track listings ==
1. "You Take My Breath Away" [Mylo Remix] 7:08
2. "You Take My Breath Away" [Album Version] 4:28
3. "You Take My Breath Away" [Puppetmasters Club Remix] 4:50
4. "You Take My Breath Away" [MHC Remix] 6:41
