= Melpo Mene =

- Origin: Stockholm, Sweden
- Genres: Indie, pop
- Years active: 2002–present
- Labels: Imperial Recordings, HyperExtension
- Members: Erik Mattiasson
- Website: Official website

Melpo Mene is indie-pop musician Erik Mattiasson from Stockholm, Sweden. His 2008 album release, Bring the Lions Out, included the single "I Adore You", which was used in a 2008 Volvo car commercial.

Melpo has played many cities, from New York City to Paris, and has shared the stage with Bon Iver, Loney Dear, José González, and more. In 2012 Melpo put out Behind The Trees, which he released independently via Redeye Distribution. This album was featured on iTunes in the Indie Spotlight and Singer/Songwriter sections, as well as featured on Spinner in their home page "Listening Party" section. The single "We Should Be Walking" received airplay on numerous college and specialty radio stations, leading him to chart at #9 in the SubModern Singles chart and was featured in an episode of ABC's The Middle. The track "Ain't Gonna Die While Sitting Down" was featured in Netflix's Hemlock Grove and the Warner Bros. Film, The Good Lie, starring Reese Witherspoon. The music video for this track premiered on Paste (magazine) and stars Actor, Peter Stormare's, daughter.

Melpo wrote the original theme song for Hulu’s Shut Eye (Season 2). He also has over 20 commercial and television placements, including AT&T, Awkward (MTV), Bored To Death (HBO), Faking It (MTV), Fishbowl California, Franklin & Bash (TNT), Graceland (USA), and Lexus. He co-wrote and produced Matt Simons “Catch and Release,” the Deepend Remix of which went #1 in Europe.

On April 22, 2021, Melpo released Vernalagnia on the record label HyperExtension. It is his first album after an eight-year hiatus. The first single from the album, “Get A Rocket” was released on October 30, 2020.

== Discography ==
=== Albums ===
- Holes (2004)
- Bring the Lions Out (2008)
- Behind The Trees (2012)
- Vernalagnia (2021)

=== Vinyl records ===
- Lady 7"
- Don't Save Me 7"

=== Extended plays ===
- Don't Save Me EP
- Hello Benjamin EP
- Jedi EP

=== Singles ===
- "Holes" (Holes, title track)
- "I Adore You" (Bring the Lions Out)
- "Snakes and Lions" (Bring the Lions Out)
- "We Should Be Walking" (Behind The Trees)
- "Get A Rocket" (Vernalagnia)
- "Once Had It All" (Vernalagnia)
- "All Of This Is True" (Vernalagnia)
- "Wrong At Last" (Vernalagnia)
