= When the Party Ends =

2023 EP by Bimini Bon-Boulash

EP by Bimini Bon-Boulash
- Released: 14 July 2023
- Genre: Pop, eurodance, electronica, trip hop, breakbeat
- Label: Relentless
- Producer: Redshank, Everyone You Know

When the Party Ends is the debut extended play (EP) by British drag performer Bimini Bon-Boulash, released on 14 July 2023. The six-track EP has tracks co-written by Bimini, Billie Blonde, and Redshank. Redshank was also a producer, as were Harvey Kirkby and Rhys Kirkby-Cox from Everyone You Know on "Different Kinds of People". "Rodeo" and "When the Party Ends" were released as singles in March and June 2023, respectively. Both also received music videos. The EP has garnered a generally positive reception.

== Background and development ==
Bimini Bon-Boulash is a British drag performer who signed with Relentless Records in 2022, after competing on the second series (2021) of RuPaul's Drag Race UK. Their recording debut was a verse for "UK Hun?" (2021), as part of the United Kingdolls, a girl group formed for a main challenge on Drag Race. Prior to When the Party Ends, Bimini had released the singles "Different Kinds of People" and "Tommy's Dream", performed at the Download Festival and Glastonbury Festival, and attended the Kerrang! Awards.

== Composition ==
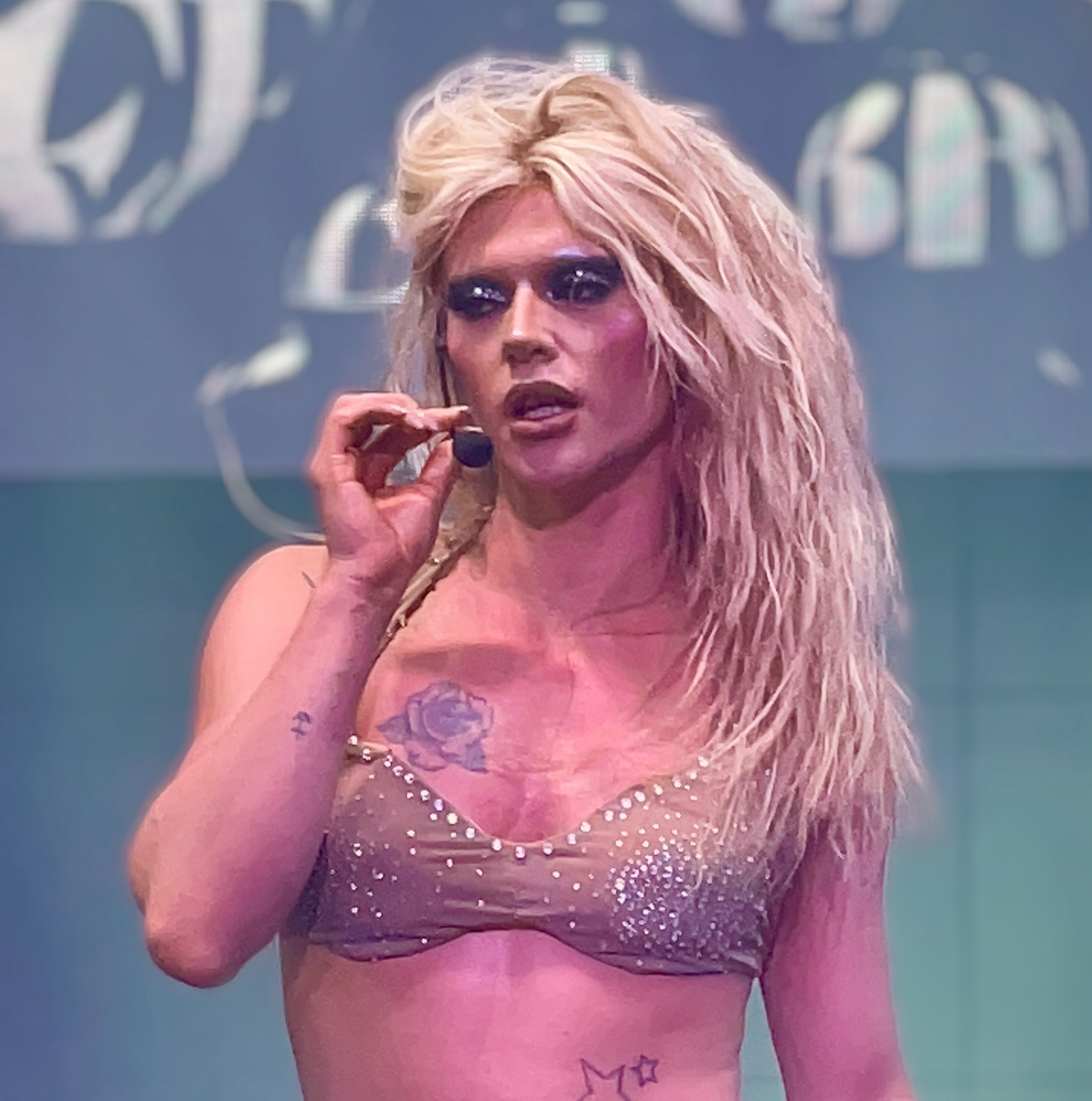
Bimini Bon-Boulash performing in 2021

The extended play (EP) When the Party Ends has six tracks. Bimini has said the EP was heavily influenced by the musical preferences of their parents. Hive Magazine said the EP has "banging alt electro-pop" tracks with various collaborators. The tracks were co-written by Bimini and produced by Redshank.

Hive described the opening track "Don't F*ck with My Groove" as "a very danceable track with its disco dub-influences and pulsing house beats, all revolving around the single lifestyle – getting ready for the good times with mates on nights out (and all the chaos that occurs in between)." The magazine called "On Pause" a "clear heartbreak dance anthem, reflecting on former relationships and the process of breaking up, with its distorted drum n' bass and Bimini spitting strong Cockney bars in the booming background".

"Different Kinds of People" is the EP's third and shortest track. It was produced by Harvey Kirkby and Rhys Kirkby-Cox from Everyone You Know. Hive said the song offers a "hyped lively energy to envision yourself on the dancefloor". The magazine said "Sex Drugs Disco" has repetitive rhythms and "consistent" chants reminiscent of music by The Prodigy, with lyrics that "are distinct and unashamedly vulnerable - detailing the vicious confusing cycles of chasing the thrill before the agonising aftermath, the difficulty of trying to quit while you're still ahead". "Rodeo" was written by Bimini, Billie Blonde, and Redshank. Bimini has said, "Rodeo makes me wanna jump around screaming at the top of my lungs. It's a song that I wrote with Billy and Redshank about 18 months ago and was a real defining moment in my sound both lyrically and musically. When I hear it now it reminds me of how far I've come and how resilient we are as humans. I was in a real dark spell when this song was written but through the shade you can hear some hope and my sassy attitude."

The EP's final and title track was also co-written by Bimini, Blond, and Redshank. Bimini has said: "The thudding beat and the deep bass, mixed with my heart spilling out over a house beat, makes this song so special to me... [It's] filled with raw emotion, ex lovers and crying on the dance floor vibes. [It] is my baby and I’m so glad it's coming out in the world". Hive said the song has a thudding bass, a memorable chorus, and an abrupt end. Bimini repeats the line "the shit gets real when the party ends".

== Promotion and release ==
"Rodeo" and "When the Party Ends" were released as singles in March and June 2023, respectively. Both tracks also received a music video. According to Hive, the video for "Rodeo" starts with Bimini approaching a mechanical bull covered in tin foil, wearing a white cowgirl outfit and a large fake fur hat, possibly as a parody of the cover art for Beyonce's 2022 studio album Renaissance, as well as an homage to the video for 'Pass This On', originally by the Swedish band The Knife. The video ends with Bimini winking and the revelation that filming took place in a "standard, unglamorous" British pub. The combination of drag with pub lad-ish culture works surprisingly well for the concept. The magazine's Katherine Monk-Watts opined, "The combination of drag with pub lad-ish culture works surprisingly well for the concept."

In July 2023, Bimini announced plans for the EP to be released on 14 July, with three previously unreleased tracks. The EP's cover art depicts Bimini with glittered tears streaming down their cheeks.

== Reception ==
Rolling Stone UK said Bimini has garnered "a reputation as a musical chameleon with no thought or care for traditional boundaries", and said the title track "dials things down and presents a more thoughtful viewpoint". Eric Brain of Hypebeast described the EP as "hedonistic and nostalgic at the same time" with "lots of contrasts throughout the project". Brain opined, "Upbeat drum'n'bass rings out heavily alongside intimate explorations of Bimini's youth and personal politics – but it's this range of emotions that gives everyone something to relate to. Late nights and one too many? 2 a.m. in the back of your mate's car blasting down a country lane? Breakups, freedom, pain, joy? It's all there – laid bare in a manner Bimini has never done before."

Katherine Monk-Watts of Hive Magazine said the EP "has a clear narrative shown in each party-related predicament – overcoming torment and temptation from messy breakups, the highs and lows amongst the Queer London party scene, all the while trying to find yourself along the way". She said "Sex Drugs Disco" is "incredibly infectious" and wrote, "I think a lot of people can relate to this track". Monk-Watts also complimented the choice to include the title track last, which she said is "guaranteed to get you dancing". She called the EP "a strong collection for the beginning of Bimini's musical artistry" and wrote, "It's full of charm, crackle and pop and pays strong tribute to 90s electronica, but it's also very real and authentic of Bimini's life and background".

== Track listing ==
1. "Don't F*ck with My Groove"
2. "On Pause"
3. "Different Kinds of People"
4. "Rodeo"
5. "Sex Drugs Disco"
6. "When the Party Ends"
