= Killing for Love =

Killing for Love may refer to:

- Killing for Love (film), a 2016 German documentary
- Killing for Love, a song by José González from his album In Our Nature
