= Down the Line (José González song) =

2007 single by José González

Single by José González

from the album In Our Nature
- Released: September 10, 2007 (UK); February 20, 2008 (Sweden)
- Genre: Folk
- Length: 3:00 (edit); 3:11 (album version)
- Label: Peacefrog Records (UK); Imperial Recordings (Sweden)
- Songwriter: José González
- Producer: José González

José González singles chronology
"'3 EP Collection'" (2007)	"Down the Line" (2007)	"'Killing for Love'" (2007)

"Down the Line" is a single from José González's second album In Our Nature. The single was released as the first single in the UK on September 10, 2007. The song was also the third single in Sweden, released on February 20, 2008. José's cover of "Smalltown Boy" by Bronski Beat was featured as a B-side. It was featured on an episode of the highly successful Australian drama series Packed to the Rafters and then featured on the platinum selling soundtrack, as well as Ministry of Sound's Chillout Sessions 10 compilation album.

The song reached #72 on Triple J Hottest 100, 2007.

== Track listing ==
UK CD & 7" vinyl:

1. "Down the Line" (edit) - 3:00
2. "Smalltown Boy" - 2:23

Swedish CD & 7" vinyl:

1. "Down the Line" - 3:11
2. "Neon Lights" - 3:08

US promo CD:

1. "Down the Line" (Michael Brauer Radio Mix) - 3:01
2. "Down the Line" (edit) - 3:00
3. "Down the Line" (album version) - 3:11
