= Black Refuge =

Black Refuge EP

EP by Junip
- Released: November 21, 2005
- Genres: Indie, folk
- Length: 18:30
- Label: Teme Shet

Junip chronology
Straight Lines (2000)	Black Refuge EP (2005)	Rope and Summit (2010)

Black Refuge EP is the second EP released by Swedish band Junip. It is composed of mostly original songs, but also includes a cover of Bruce Springsteen's "The Ghost of Tom Joad".

== Track listing ==
1. "Black Refuge" – 3:25
2. "Turn to the Assassin" – 3:36
3. "Official" – 6:02
4. "Chugga-chugga" – 1:54
5. "The Ghost of Tom Joad" (Bruce Springsteen) – 4:11

== Personnel ==
- Elias Araya – drums
- José González – vocals, guitar
- Tobias Winterkorn – organ, Moog synthesizer
