= Straight Lines (EP) =

EP by Junip
- Released: 2000
- Recorded: 3–5 March 2000
- Length: 17:42
- Language: English
- Label: Kakafoni

Junip chronology
Straight Lines (2000)	Black Refuge EP (2005)

Straight Lines is an EP by the Swedish band Junip. It was originally released on 7" vinyl in 2000 in a limited edition of 500 copies. The sleeve includes the message: "This is kakafoni 1, the beginning of a musical chaos with no end in sight. Please write to us". The album was recorded and mixed by Don Alsterberg and mastered by Don Alsterberg and Andreas Stridh.

== Track listing ==
1. "HC" – 4:12
2. "Cut the Rope" – 5:08
3. "Dilettante" – 3:54
4. "Straight Lines" – 4:28

== Personnel ==
- Elias Araya – drums
- Tobias Winterkorn – organ (Farfisa), effects, vocals
- José González – vocals, guitar
