= The Knife (The Knife album) =

2001 studio album by the Knife

Studio album by the Knife
- Released: 5 February 2001
- Recorded: Tjörn; Gothenburg; Stockholm
- Genres: Synth-pop; electropop
- Length: 46:09
- Label: Rabid
- Producer: The Knife

The Knife chronology
The Knife (2001)	Deep Cuts (2003)

Singles from The Knife
- 1. "N.Y. Hotel" Released: 1 May 2001

Professional ratings
Review scores
Source	Rating
AllMusic	3.5/5 stars
Pitchfork	6.3/10
PopMatters	6/10

The Knife is the debut studio album by Swedish electronic music duo the Knife, released on 5 February 2001 by Rabid Records. The album's recordings started early in the summer of 1999 in a cottage on the Swedish island of Tjörn. The duo also recorded it in their flats in Gothenburg and Stockholm, and in a rehearsal studio in the Hökarängen district of Stockholm.

On 31 October 2006, Mute Records released this and the Knife's second album, Deep Cuts, in the United States, marking the first Stateside release of both titles.

== Track listing ==
All tracks are written by Karin Dreijer and Olof Dreijer.

No.	Title	Length
1.	"Neon"	4:07
2.	"Lasagna"	5:07
3.	"Kino"	3:13
4.	"I Just Had to Die"	4:34
5.	"I Take Time"	3:04
6.	"Parade"	3:50
7.	"Zapata"	4:10
8.	"Bird"	4:34
9.	"N.Y. Hotel"	2:47
10.	"A Lung"	3:26
11.	"Reindeer"	7:11

UK edition bonus tracks
No.	Title	Length
12.	"High School Poem"	1:23
13.	"Hannah's Conscious"	3:43
14.	"Vegetarian Restaurant"	2:33

=== The Knife 10-inch ===
The Knife

EP by the Knife
- Released: 23 February 2004
- Label: Rabid

The UK release of the album was preceded, on 23 February 2004, by the release of a limited-edition 10-inch EP also titled The Knife. The track listing was as follows:

A1. "Kino"
A2. "Bird"
B1. "N.Y. Hotel"
B2. "High School Poem"

== Personnel ==
Credits adapted from the liner notes of The Knife.

- The Knife – recording, production, mixing, accordion, alto saxophone, electric guitar, acoustic guitar, bass guitar, organ, synthesisers, drum machine, sampling, drum programming, vocals, cover design
- Henrik Jonsson – mastering
- Albin Lindblad – handclapping

== Release history ==
Release history for The Knife
Region	Date	Label	Ref.
Sweden	5 February 2001	Rabid	
United Kingdom	8 March 2004	Rabid	
United Kingdom	28 August 2006	Brille	
United States	31 October 2006	Mute	
Germany	19 January 2007	V2	
