= Pass This On =

2003 single by The Knife

Single by The Knife

from the album Deep Cuts
- Released: 2003
- Genre: Electropop; synth-pop
- Length: 3:48
- Label: Rabid Records
- Songwriters: Karin Dreijer; Olof Dreijer
- Producer: The Knife

The Knife singles chronology
"You Take My Breath Away" (2003)	"Pass This On" (2003)	"Handy-Man" (2003)

Music video
- "Pass This On" on YouTube

"Pass This On" is a single from the Swedish electronic duo The Knife, released in 2003. It is the third track on The Knife's second studio album, Deep Cuts.

== Music video ==
=== Synopsis and credits ===
"A flaxen haired, spider-limbed female impersonator takes the mic in a rustic chalet. A woman in the small audience gets up out of her seat. Is she leaving? A glaring thug approaches the stage. Is he going to end her song by force? No, they're both moved by the music, and soon everyone is dancing. Except for one young woman, whose blank stare closes out the video on a question mark." (Slant Magazine, January, 2010)

The music video for the song was directed by Johan Renck and features female impersonator Rickard Engfors in a room lip-synching to the song. Both members of The Knife, Karin and Olof Dreijer, are visible in the video; Olof is seen dancing next to Engfors and flirting with him, and Karin appears at the end of the video, sitting at a table and looking at Engfors and Olof.

=== Other versions ===
Covered by Dan Sartain in 2014 on his album Dudesblood.

Formed the basis of Carnival's 2006 house track "Not Over Yet".

=== Reception ===
Slant Magazine placed the music video for "Pass This On" at No. 37 on its Best of the Aughts: Music Videos.

== Track listings ==
- Swedish CD, Maxi single
1. "Pass This On (Dahlback & Dahlback Remix)" - 5:36
2. "Pass This On (M.A.N.D.Y. Remix)" - 6:58
3. "Pass This On (M.A.N.D.Y. Instrumental)" -6:55
- UK CD single
1. "Pass This On (Original)" - 3:49
2. "Pass This On (Dahlbäck And Dahlbäck Mix)" - 5:32
3. "Pass This On (M.A.N.D.Y. Knifer Mix)" - 6:54

== Charts ==
Chart (2005)	Peak Position
UK Singles Chart	134
