= The Ghost of Tom Joad (song) =

1995 song by Bruce Springsteen

Single by Bruce Springsteen

from the album The Ghost of Tom Joad
- Released: November 21, 1995
- Recorded: April–June 1995
- Studio: Thrill Hill West in Los Angeles
- Genre: Folk rock
- Length: 4:23
- Label: Columbia
- Songwriter: Bruce Springsteen
- Producers: Bruce Springsteen; Chuck Plotkin

Bruce Springsteen singles chronology
"Secret Garden" (1995)	"The Ghost of Tom Joad" (1995)	"Sad Eyes" (1999)

Music video
- "The Ghost of Tom Joad" (audio) on YouTube

"The Ghost of Tom Joad" is a folk rock song written by American rock singer, songwriter, and guitarist Bruce Springsteen, released in November 1995 by Columbia Records as the first single from his eleventh studio album by the same name (1995). It was produced by Springsteen and Chuck Plotkin. The character Tom Joad, from John Steinbeck's classic 1939 novel The Grapes of Wrath, is mentioned in the title and narrative.

Originally a quiet folk song, "The Ghost of Tom Joad" has also been covered by Rage Against the Machine and Junip. Springsteen himself has performed the song in a variety of arrangements, including with the E Street Band, and a live recording featuring Rage Against the Machine's Tom Morello as guest. In 2013, Springsteen re-recorded the track with Morello for his eighteenth studio album, High Hopes (2014).

== Springsteen original ==
Besides The Grapes of Wrath, the song also takes inspiration from "The Ballad of Tom Joad" by Woody Guthrie, which in turn was inspired by John Ford's film adaptation of Steinbeck's novel. Springsteen had in fact read the book, watched the film, and listened to the song, before writing "The Ghost of Tom Joad", and the result was viewed as being true to Guthrie's tradition. Springsteen identified with 1930s-style social activism, and sought to give voice to the invisible and unheard, the destitute and the disenfranchised. His use of characterization was similarly influenced by Steinbeck and Ford.

However, like the rest of the album, "The Ghost of Tom Joad" is set in the early-to-mid-1990s, with contemporary times being likened to Dust Bowl images:

Men walkin' 'long the railroad tracks,
Goin' someplace, there's no goin' back.
Highway patrol choppers comin' up over the ridge —
Hot soup on a campfire under the bridge.

The third verse is the most direct link to The Grapes of Wrath, being an extensive paraphrase of Tom Joad's famous "Wherever there's a ..." speech.

"The Ghost of Tom Joad" was originally recorded as an E Street Band number, intended for inclusion as one of the new tracks on his February 1995 Greatest Hits album. However, Springsteen did not like the arrangement, and he put the song aside for his next project.

The released "The Ghost of Tom Joad" was recorded between April and June 1995, at Springsteen's Los Angeles home studio. It was recorded with a light and muted accompaniment, featuring Springsteen on guitar and harmonica, E Street Band members Danny Federici on keyboards and Garry Tallent on bass, and session musicians Marty Rifkin on pedal steel guitar and dobro and Gary Mallaber on drums. Springsteen's vocal phrasing tends to fade off at the end of each line of the song.

Springsteen's recording was released with the album on November 21, 1995. It was given limited release as a single in The Netherlands and the UK, wherein the latter it reached number 26 on the UK Singles Chart. It was not released as a single in the U.S., and radio airplay on album-oriented rock stations was practically non-existent.

=== Critical reception ===
Professional ratings
Review scores
Source	Rating
Smash Hits	1/5 stars

Pan-European magazine Music & Media described the song as "a chilling tale of a homeless drifter's futile hope for better times."

=== Music video ===
A non-representational music video was made of "The Ghost of Tom Joad". It featured a black-and-white photo montage constrained to a subsection of the screen resembling a rear-view mirror. Depressed U.S. Route 66-area American scenes were featured; though set in the 1990s, many could have passed for the 1930s. Occasionally a line from the song would flash on the screen.

=== Live performance history ===
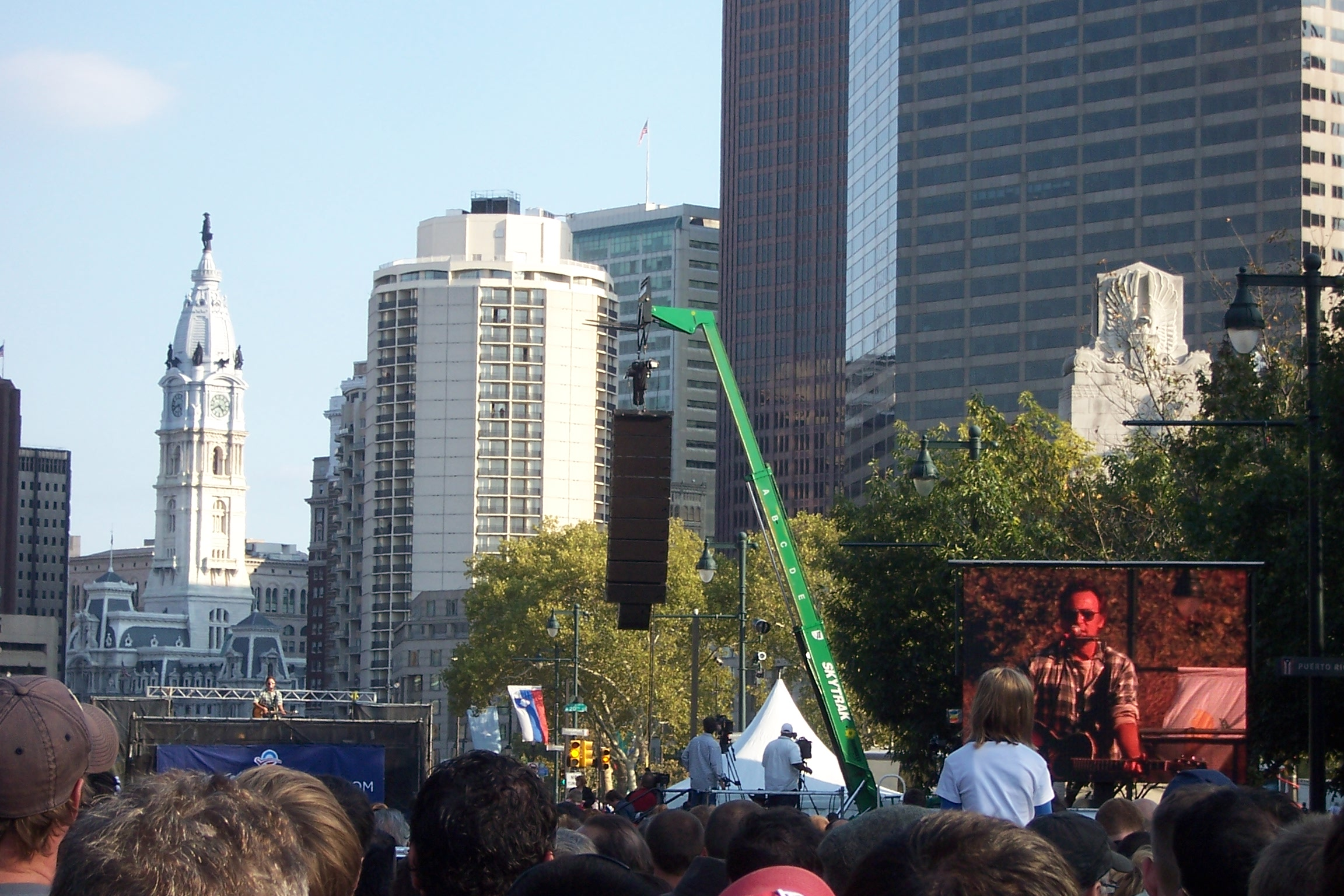
Springsteen performing "The Ghost of Tom Joad" at an early October 2008 Change Rocks voter registration rally on behalf of Barack Obama, on Philadelphia's Benjamin Franklin Parkway.

The song opened most of the shows on the 1995–1997 solo acoustic Ghost of Tom Joad Tour, and gave audience members a clear indication as to what the night would be like. (For a few shows before and after a September 1996 Woody Guthrie-oriented benefit concert, he played "Tom Joad" instead.) On February 26, 1997, while the tour was still going on, he performed "The Ghost of Tom Joad" at the Grammy Awards of 1997, where the album won the Grammy Award for Best Contemporary Folk Album.

This and "Youngstown" are the only songs from The Ghost of Tom Joad album that have continued to have a significant presence in Springsteen's concert repertoire. "The Ghost of Tom Joad" was featured during the 1999–2000 E Street Band Reunion Tour, in arrangement fairly close to the album's, albeit with Federici often playing accordion and Tallent on stand-up bass. In the U.S., the large arena audiences frequently treated the song's appearance as the signal for a bathroom or beer run. The song became an infrequent appearer after that, perhaps surprisingly only showing twice on the 2005 solo Devils & Dust Tour.

The song made several appearances on Springsteen's 2006 "big folk" Sessions Band Tour, in a new arrangement that featured member Frank Bruno handling some of the vocals, and two extended instrumental passages that saw soaring interplay between violin, pedal steel guitar, trumpet, and harmonica. One such rendition was captured on the subsequent Bruce Springsteen with The Sessions Band: Live in Dublin album as a bonus track for PBS pledgers, and was also included as the lead track of the 2007 World Hunger Year/Hard Rock Café benefit album Serve2.

A live version of the song from the 2008 third leg of Springsteen and the E Street Band's Magic Tour featured Rage Against the Machine guitarist Tom Morello singing a verse and joining Springsteen on the choruses, and playing two long guitar solos using sounds not otherwise found in the E Street Band palette. This performance was subsequently included on the 2008 Springsteen EP Magic Tour Highlights in audio and video manifestations.

Springsteen and Morello performed this song in acoustic fashion near the end of Pete Seeger's 90th Birthday Concert at Madison Square Garden on May 3, 2009. The video was broadcast on public television later in that year. Later in 2009, at the Rock and Roll Hall of Fame 25th Anniversary Concert held at Madison Square Garden, Springsteen, the E Street Band, and Morello reprised their full-tilt electric rendition of the song.

Highlighting the song's political import, Springsteen included it in the "Change Rocks" acoustic performances he made at rallies in early October 2008 on behalf of Barack Obama's presidential campaign. The next year, Springsteen re-recorded the song, at his New Jersey home and accompanied only by his own acoustic guitar and harmonica, for the November 2009 documentary The People Speak.

When Morello replaced Steven Van Zandt for the Australian leg of the Springsteen and the E Street Band's Wrecking Ball Tour in March 2013, the song was a highlighted number in the shows.

On June 19, 2018, in the middle of a swirling controversy about the Trump administration's treatment of immigrant families, Springsteen added the song to his set list for his Springsteen on Broadway show—the first set list change in 146 performances.

On January 30, 2026, at the Minneapolis, MN “Concert of Solidarity and Resistance to Defend Minnesota” at First Avenue, Tom Morello and Bruce Springsteen performed "The Ghost of Tom Joad", after Springsteen's live debut of The Streets of Minneapolis with the E Street Band. The midday concert, performed before the protest march being held that afternoon in Minneapolis, was in solidarity with the Minneapolis, Twin Cities, and greater Minnesota communities defending their neighbors and protesting against federal immigration actions. The entire band then began a short multi-city US tour in which the song was a highlight, prominently featuring Morello's creative guitar work as its climax.

On October 3, 2026, Springsteen and Morello performed the song at the Power to the People festival at the Merriweather Post Pavilion in Maryland.

=== 2013 rerecording ===
"The Ghost of Tom Joad" was re-recorded yet again by Springsteen during that Australian leg, with Morello on guitar and vocals, and is featured on Springsteen's 2014 collection of reworkings and outtakes, High Hopes.

=== Charts ===
Chart (1996)	Peak position
Italy Airplay (Music & Media)	7
Netherlands (Dutch Top 40 Tipparade)	10
Netherlands (Dutch Single Tip)	11
UK Singles (OCC)	26

== Personnel ==
According to album liner notes:

- Bruce Springsteen - vocals, guitar, harmonica
- Danny Federici - keyboards
- Garry Tallent - bass
- Gary Mallaber - drums
- Marty Rifkin - pedal steel guitar

== Rage Against the Machine version ==
"The Ghost of Tom Joad"

Single by Rage Against the Machine

from the album Rage Against the Machine (1997 video) and Renegades
- Released: November 25, 1997
- Genre: Rap metal; alternative metal
- Length: 5:38
- Label: Epic
- Songwriter: Bruce Springsteen

Rage Against the Machine singles chronology
"Calm Like a Bomb" (2000)	"The Ghost of Tom Joad" (1997)	"Renegades of Funk" (2001)

Music video
- "The Ghost of Tom Joad" on YouTube

The song was recorded by American rock band Rage Against the Machine. Their release of the song was initially included as a 'free single' which shipped with an early release of the VHS version of their 1997 home video. The single was recorded in mid-August in Atlanta, GA after the band performed a show on August 10 at the Lakewood Amphitheatre on Brendan O'Brien's recommendation after he saw the band perform it on the U2 Popmart Tour.

This rendition is performed in the band's usual rap rock style with live vocals echoed heavily. Other than the style of music, the most radical change was the 4/4 time signature which differs from Springsteen's measure of 3/4 meter, followed by three measures of 4/4. While thus radically different from the Springsteen original, it too was considered to be in line with the Guthrie tradition. It was a modest commercial success, in 1997 reaching number 35 on the Mainstream Rock Tracks chart and number 34 on the Modern Rock Tracks chart. It thus became the group's second charted song, following "Bulls on Parade".

The 1997-single version differs slightly from one on the post-breakup Renegades album, as the band decided to re-record the song for that project. The original version would be later included in the No Boundaries: A Benefit for the Kosovar Refugees compilation album. The cover artwork is called "Police Riot" by Eric Drooker.

"The Ghost of Tom Joad" made its Rage live debut on April 25, 1997, at Sam Boyd Stadium in Las Vegas.

As part of the Nurses United protest against NATO Summit Chicago 2012, Morello and Tim McIlrath of Rise Against played an electric version of "The Ghost of Tom Joad" to a packed Daley Center Plaza crowd.

During's 2016's Make America Rage Again tour by Prophets of Rage, Tom Morello shared vocal duties with Aaron Bruno of Awolnation.

=== Music video ===
Heather Parry produced and directed a live video for the song, shot in Irvine Meadows on September 18 and 19. It is identical to the version on the self-titled Rage Against the Machine video.

=== Track listing ===
1. "The Ghost of Tom Joad"
2. "Vietnow [Live in Detroit, August 1997]"
3. "The Ghost of Tom Joad [Live Version]"

== Other interpretations ==
Pete Seeger recorded the song with Springsteen adding a counterpoint vocal as well as guitar and harmonica in the compilation Sowing The Seeds celebrating Appleseed Recordings' 10th anniversary.

Welsh singer/songwriter Martyn Joseph occasionally uses the song live, and has recorded it on his 2004 album of cover versions, Run To Cover.

The Swedish band Junip later covered the song on their Black Refuge EP in 2005.

Canadian group Nickelback has performed "The Ghost of Tom Joad" in their concerts, in an arrangement very similar to Rage Against the Machine's. Indeed, in introductions they have identified the song as Rage's, and have played it as a tribute to the band's having (at that time) broken up.

Modern Irish traditional band Solas covered the song in their February 2010 release The Turning Tide.

English folk rock band Mumford & Sons performed the song at A Salute To Steinbeck in Monterey, California on August 24, 2012. The band have been vocal about Steinbeck's influence on their songs and, in partnership with the John Steinbeck House and lead singer Marcus Mumford's brother James, put on the event as a way to celebrate the author.

Punk rock band Rise Against covered the song in September 2012 at the Honda Center in Anaheim, California with multiple guests including Tom Morello of Rage Against the Machine, Brian Fallon of the Gaslight Anthem, and Wayne Kramer. The band would later go on to release the song on their album Long Forgotten Songs: B-Sides & Covers 2000–2013.

Italian folk rock band Modena City Ramblers covered the song in their 2015 album Tracce clandestine.
