= The Secret Life of Walter Mitty (2013 film) =

2013 film by Ben Stiller

- Theatrical release poster
- Directed by: Ben Stiller
- Screenplay by: Steve Conrad
- Based on: "The Secret Life of Walter Mitty" by James Thurber
- Produced by: Samuel Goldwyn, Jr.; John Goldwyn; Stuart Cornfeld; Ben Stiller
- Starring: Ben Stiller; Kristen Wiig; Shirley MacLaine; Adam Scott; Kathryn Hahn; Sean Penn
- Cinematography: Stuart Dryburgh
- Edited by: Greg Hayden
- Music by: Theodore Shapiro; Jose Gonzalez; Rogue Wave
- Production companies: Samuel Goldwyn Films; Red Hour Productions; New Line Cinema; Big Screen Productions; Down Productions; Ingenious Media
- Distributed by: 20th Century Fox
- Release dates: October 5, 2013 (NYFF); December 25, 2013 (United States)
- Running time: 114 minutes
- Countries: Australia; Canada; United Kingdom; United States
- Language: English
- Budget: $90 million
- Box office: $188.3 million

The Secret Life of Walter Mitty is a 2013 adventure comedy-drama film directed, co-produced by and starring Ben Stiller and written by Steve Conrad. The film also stars Kristen Wiig, Shirley MacLaine, Adam Scott, Kathryn Hahn, and Sean Penn. Though "more of a remake" of the 1947 film of the same name, both are film adaptations of James Thurber's 1939 short story. It follows a maladaptive daydreamer named Walter Mitty on his quest to find a missing negative print and its elusive photojournalist for Life magazine's final print issue.

Following a tumultuous production hell that spanned multiple studios, directors and leading actors dating back to 1994, it finally found traction in 2011 with Stiller as director and star of the film. The film premiered at the New York Film Festival on October 5, 2013, and was theatrically released by 20th Century Fox on December 25, 2013, in North America to generally mixed reception, with praise for Stiller's direction, cinematography, and its soundtrack featuring José González. It was chosen by the National Board of Review as one of the top ten films of 2013. In recent years, appreciation for the film has increased and it is now considered by many to be a cult classic.

== Plot ==
Walter Mitty is a negative assets manager at Life magazine living alone in New York City. He chronically daydreams and has a secret crush on Cheryl Melhoff, a coworker. Walter attempts to contact Cheryl via eHarmony, but eHarmony customer service agent Todd Mahar explains that Walter's account profile is not filled out completely: the "been there" and "done that" sections are blank.

Walter works with legendary photojournalist Sean O'Connell, although they have never met in person. Sean is "old-school", working with analog film and later sending a telegram. At work, Walter receives a negative roll from Sean, as well as a wallet in appreciation of Walter's work. Sean relays to Walter and Life management that he believes negative #25 captures the "quintessence of life" and should be used for the cover of the magazine's final print issue before it becomes digital. However, the negative #25 is missing. When Ted Hendricks, the obnoxious manager of the magazine's transition, asks to see #25, Walter stalls, worried about being fired. He then asks Cheryl for help in contacting O'Connell. Walter looks to the other negatives for clues to Sean's location – water, a thumb, and a mysterious curved object.

Walter and Hernando, his assistant, see a reflection in the water, which is the name of a ship registered in Greenland. Walter reluctantly takes a plane to Greenland. A bartender in Nuuk explains that Sean left on a ship. To reach him, Walter would need to go on the postal helicopter, whose pilot is drunk. Walter recognizes the pilot's thumb from one of the negatives and joins the pilot on a trip to bring supplies to the ship. Walter accidentally jumps into ice-cold, shark-infested waters, losing the ship's supplies and preventing radio communication when he comes aboard. There, Walter learns that Sean departed the ship a few days earlier and discovers from notes on wrapping paper for a clementine cake Sean left behind that he is heading to Iceland to photograph the volcano Eyjafjallajökull.

The ship brings Walter to Iceland. He then bikes, skateboards, and runs through the Icelandic countryside to find Sean but misses him as the volcano erupts. Dejected, he returns home. Hendricks assumes that Walter misplaced the negative and fires him. He tries to visit Cheryl but spots her ex-husband and leaves. Walter visits his mother and throws away the wallet from Sean. He recognizes the curve of the piano in his mother's house while looking at the last negative. When asked, she tells Walter that she baked him the clementine cake. She had told him earlier, but he was daydreaming.

Walter figures out from the notes that Sean is in the Afghan Himalayas. After an arduous journey, he finds him photographing a rare snow leopard. When asked about the negative, Sean explains that, attempting to be playful, he had placed the negative in the wallet. He decides not to tell Walter what the picture actually depicts. When Walter returns to America, the airport security in Los Angeles detains him for arriving from Afghanistan. To verify his identity, Walter calls the only person he knows in Los Angeles: Todd, from eHarmony, who has kept in contact during Walter's travels. Todd expresses admiration for how adventurous Walter appears.

Walter receives the wallet from his mother, who had retrieved it from the trash, and obtains the negative but chooses not to look at it. Emboldened, he delivers it to Life's offices and berates Hendricks for disrespecting the staff.

Walter reunites with Cheryl and thanks her for inspiring him on his journey. Cheryl asks about his adventures and tells him that her ex-husband had only been at her house to help with repairs. Walking along the street, they see the final print issue on sale at a newsstand, and on its cover, they see the photograph from #25. It shows Walter sitting outside of the Life building, examining a contact sheet; the magazine is dedicated to Life's staff, and Sean's note referred to "quintessence of Life". Walter and Cheryl continue their walk holding hands.

== Cast ==
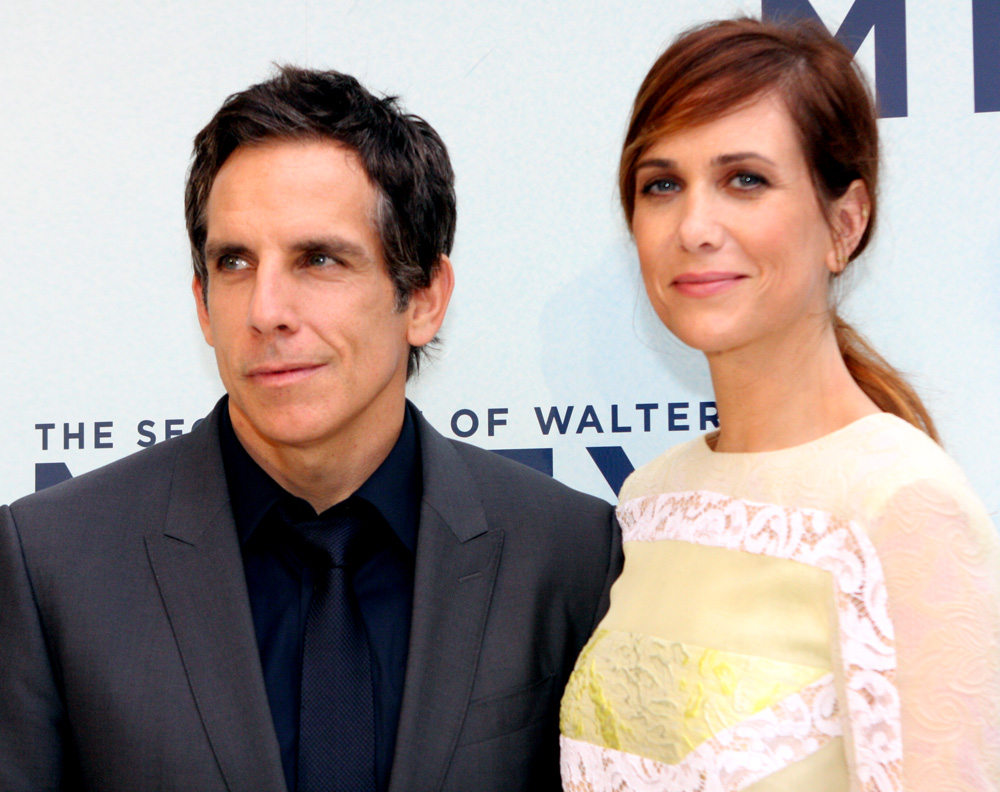
Ben Stiller and Kristen Wiig at an event promoting the film in 2013

- Ben Stiller as Walter Mitty, a negative asset manager at Life
- Kristen Wiig as Cheryl Melhoff, Walter's love interest and co-worker
- Shirley MacLaine as Edna Mitty, Walter's mother
- Adam Scott as Ted Hendricks, managing director of the 'Transition' to Life Online
- Kathryn Hahn as Odessa Mitty, Walter's sister
- Patton Oswalt as Todd Maher, an eHarmony customer service representative
- Adrian Martinez as Hernando, Walter's understudy and co-worker
- Ólafur Darri Ólafsson as a drunken Greenlandic helicopter pilot
- Sean Penn as Sean O'Connell, a photojournalist
- Jon Daly as Tim Naughton, one of Walter's co-workers
- Terence Bernie Hines as Gary Mannheim, one of Walter's co-workers
- Marcus Antturi as Rich Melhoff, Cheryl's son
- Kai Lennox as Phil Melhoff, Cheryl's ex-husband
- Conan O'Brien as himself
- Andy Richter as himself
- Joey Slotnick as himself
- Radio Man as himself

== Production ==
=== Development ===
Producer Samuel Goldwyn, Jr., whose father produced the 1947 film adaptation, conceived the idea of doing a remake in 1994; he had Jim Carrey in mind for the title role. Walt Disney Pictures was eager to purchase the remake rights, but Goldwyn instead chose New Line Cinema, which had a positive working relationship with Carrey on Dumb and Dumber and The Mask (both 1994). New Line Cinema bought the rights in 1995 with the understanding that The Samuel Goldwyn Company would be involved in creative decisions. Babaloo Mandel and Lowell Ganz turned in the first draft of the screenplay in July 1997. Ron Howard entered negotiations to direct the same month, and to cover producing duties with Brian Grazer and Imagine Entertainment. Howard and Imagine Entertainment eventually left the project in favor of EDtv, and The Secret Life of Walter Mitty languished in development hell over the challenges of using a contemporary storyline.

In May 1999, New Line Cinema hired The Mask director Chuck Russell to rewrite the script and serve as Howard's replacement. Filming was set to begin in early 2000, but was pushed back. Around this time, Peter Tolan worked on rewrites. In May 2001, Goldwyn filed a lawsuit against New Line Cinema for breach of contract. Goldwyn claimed that the studio extended their 1995 deal until May 2001, but then announced that it wanted to transfer the rights for the remake to another company and have Goldwyn surrender his creative input. In November 2002, New Line Cinema was forced to revert the film rights back to Goldwyn, who won his lawsuit and took the property to Paramount Pictures. During pre-production discussions between Paramount and DreamWorks on Lemony Snicket's A Series of Unfortunate Events (which starred Carrey), Steven Spielberg, head of DreamWorks, rekindled interest in working with Carrey; the duo previously considered Meet the Parents, but the outing fell apart. In May 2003, Spielberg agreed to direct, and brought in DreamWorks to co-finance The Secret Life of Walter Mitty with Paramount (which would acquire DreamWorks in 2006).

By November 2003, Zach Helm was rewriting the script, but Spielberg and DreamWorks vacated the film in April 2004 in favor of War of the Worlds and Munich. "The goal is to go back to the short story and capture not only the content but the original spirit," producer John Goldwyn (son of Samuel) told The Hollywood Reporter. Screenwriter Richard LaGravenese entered discussion to write a new script following Spielberg's departure. Samuel Goldwyn commented that LaGravenese's script had a momentous and unique approach compared to others. "I'd always felt that unless we got a great script, the movie disintegrates into a series of wonderful gags," Goldwyn explained. "Writers always fixated on that. [Richard] worked for 10 months on umpteen drafts, and he solved it." In March 2005, Paramount hired Mark Waters to direct LaGravenese's script for The Secret Life of Walter Mitty, but Carrey had to drop out due to scheduling conflicts. He was soon replaced by Owen Wilson.

Despite not having a final budget, Paramount scheduled a December 12, 2005, start date because their option on the remake rights was to end one week later; they would lose the rights if they did not start filming before December 20. Wilson dropped out in October 2005 over creative differences. The Hollywood Reporter also speculated that The Secret Life of Walter Mitty began to falter after Paramount failed to cast a female lead to star opposite Wilson. Scarlett Johansson had emerged as the front-runner for the role of Cheryl Melhoff after screen testing with Wilson earlier in October, but a deal was never signed with Johansson. Paramount executives Brad Grey and Gail Berman decided to put The Secret Life of Walter Mitty in turnaround in November 2005. Goldwyn found favor at 20th Century Fox and, in May 2007, it was announced that Mike Myers was attached to star in the title role. Jay Kogen was hired to write a new script that would be specifically tailored for Myers.

In April 2010, Sacha Baron Cohen was offered and accepted the lead role. Later that month, The Pursuit of Happyness writer Steven Conrad was hired to pen the screenplay, with Gore Verbinski announced as director in June 2010. Verbinski would later drop out of directing but remained as executive producer on the film.

In April 2011, it was announced that Ben Stiller had been cast in the lead role, though no director was attached. The following July, it was announced that Stiller was also going to direct the film.

=== Production ===
In January 2012, it was announced that Kristen Wiig would play the female lead, with Shirley MacLaine to play Walter's mother. This was followed by reports in February that Patton Oswalt and Adam Scott had joined the film. In April 2012, Kathryn Hahn was cast as Odessa, Walter's sister, and Josh Charles was cast as the ex-husband of Kristen Wiig's character, though he was replaced by Kai Lennox. Later that month, Sean Penn was cast in what was described as a "small but pivotal supporting role" as photojournalist Sean O'Connell.

The portions of the film set in Nuuk, Greenland, were in fact shot in Stykkishólmur, a village on the Snæfellsnes peninsula in Iceland, and Höfn, a village in southeast Iceland. Later sequences set in Stykkishólmur were actually filmed in Seyðisfjörður. The sequences where Walter Mitty follows Sean to Afghanistan were also filmed in Iceland, at the Skogafoss waterfall and in Vatnajökull National Park.

The Secret Life of Walter Mitty was shot entirely on analog film. CBS News reported "a significant portion of the film examines today's [2013] digital age[.]" Stiller said this was important, finding "this analog-to-digital transition ... sort of sad." Stiller claimed everyone was trying to replicate film with digital cameras, but he could simply have the movie shot on film.

=== Stunts ===
Despite using stunt doubles, actor-director Stiller did perform some of the stunt action himself. A double (Note: Greg Fitzpatrick) jumped from the helicopter, but Stiller claims he actually swam in the water. He says "half those shots" are really him—citing an example of him hiking up a glacier.

I try to do as much stuff as possible – and try to do it all as real as possible. Because I want that experience for the audience, which I think you can feel. I just feel like audiences feel the difference with that.

— Ben Stiller

During the skateboarding scene in Central Park, pro skater Rodney Mullen served as Ben Stiller's stunt double. For the other skateboarding scene going down a mountain, another double (Note: Brian Holden) was used. However, the close shots were Stiller. The safety rig he wore was painted out in the final film.

== Release ==
In April 2013, nearly 20 minutes of footage was presented by Fox at CinemaCon in Las Vegas, followed by a theatrical trailer release in July, both of which began to spark awards speculation.

The film made its world premiere as the Centerpiece Gala presentation at the New York Film Festival on October 5, 2013. It was also selected to serve as the Centerpiece Gala presentation at the 2013 AFI Film Festival.

=== Marketing ===
20th Century Fox hired filmmaker Casey Neistat to make a promotional video based on the theme of "live your dreams", but Neistat suggested instead to spend the budget on bringing disaster relief to the Philippines in the wake of Typhoon Haiyan. Fox agreed and gave him a budget of $25,000.

=== Home media ===
The Secret Life of Walter Mitty was released on DVD and Blu-ray on April 15, 2014, by 20th Century Fox Home Entertainment.

== Reception ==
=== Critical response ===
The Secret Life of Walter Mitty received mixed reviews from critics. Review aggregator Rotten Tomatoes gives the film a score of 52% based on reviews from 198 critics, with an average rating of 6.00/10. The site's consensus reads: "It doesn't lack for ambition, but The Secret Life of Walter Mitty fails to back up its grand designs with enough substance to anchor the spectacle." Metacritic gives the film a weighted average score of 54 out of 100 based on reviews from 39 critics, indicating "mixed or average reviews". Audiences surveyed by CinemaScore gave the film a B+ rating.

Glenn Kenny of RogerEbert.com gave the film a scathing review, writing that it "grated on my nerves...while everything Stiller attempts here has a real professional polish, what Mitty lacks is any sense of what life might actually be like for the kind of 'ordinary man' Mitty represents." Peter Debruge of Variety magazine criticized the film for lacking the satirical tone of the original story, comparing the film to "a feature-length 'Just Do It' ad" for the middle-aged audience the film was targeting. Debruge noted that the script downplayed the comedy, and that a scene inspired by The Curious Case of Benjamin Button shows the film could have been made funnier, but that the more serious emotional dimension ultimately made the film feel more substantial.

The film had its share of admirers. Peter Travers of Rolling Stone gave the film a positive review, saying "In his uniquely funny and unexpectedly tender movie, Stiller takes us on a personal journey of lingering resonance." Joe Neumaier of New York Daily awarded the film five out of five stars, saying "The story Stiller tells manages to float in a most peculiar, satisfying way." Political radio show host and film critic Michael Medved was also positive concerning the film, calling it "one of the feel-good movies of the year."

The film was criticized for the product placement of several brands which featured prominently in the storyline.

In 2016, Rolling Stone magazine asked readers to choose their top 10 Ben Stiller movies. The Secret Life of Walter Mitty was rated as Stiller's third-best film.

=== Accolades ===
List of awards and nominations
Award/Film festival	Year	Category	Recipients	Result
National Board of Review	2013	Top Ten Films	The Secret Life of Walter Mitty	Won
Satellite Awards	2014	Best Cinematography	Stuart Dryburgh	Nominated
Satellite Awards	2014	Best Original Score	Theodore Shapiro	Nominated
Location Managers Guild Awards	2014	Outstanding Location Feature Film	The Secret Life of Walter Mitty	Won
Costume Designers Guild Awards	2014	Excellence in Contemporary Film	Sarah Edwards	Nominated
Saturn Awards	June 2014	Saturn Award for Best Fantasy Film	The Secret Life of Walter Mitty	Nominated
Saturn Awards	June 2014	Saturn Award for Best Actor	Ben Stiller	Nominated
Key Art Awards	2013	Best Audio Visual Technique	The Secret Life of Walter Mitty	Won
Key Art Awards	2013	Best Trailer	The Secret Life of Walter Mitty	Runner-Up
New York Film Festival	2013	Best Film	The Secret Life of Walter Mitty	Nominated
Visual Effects Society Awards	2014	Outstanding Supporting Effects in a Feature Motion Picture	Guillaume Rocheron, Kurt Williams, Monette Dubin, and Ivan Moran	Nominated

== Soundtrack ==
The film features the following songs:

- "Maneater" – Performed by Grace Mitchell
- "Escape (The Piña Colada Song)" – Performed by Jack Johnson
- "Wake Up" – Performed by Arcade Fire
- "Don't You Want Me" – Written by Phil Oakey, Philip Adrian Wright (as Philip Wright), and Jo Callis
- "Far Away" – Performed by José González
- "Far Away" – Performed by Junip
- "Space Oddity" – Performed by David Bowie and Kristen Wiig (uncredited)
- "Lake Michigan" – Performed by Rogue Wave
- "Dirty Paws" – Performed by Of Monsters and Men
- "The Wolves and the Ravens" – Performed by Rogue Valley (Chris Koza)
- "Stay Alive" – Performed by José González
- "Step Out" – Performed by José González
- "Don't Let It Pass" – Performed by Junip
- "#9 Dream" – Performed by José González, written by John Lennon

=== "Space Oddity" ===
The song "Space Oddity" by David Bowie plays a significant role throughout the film. Walter Mitty is referred to mockingly as "Major Tom" by his new boss, Hendricks, in reference to the astronaut Major Tom in "Space Oddity", due to his frequent daydreaming: the boss interprets the line "ground control to Major Tom" as akin to "Earth to Walter; come in Walter". Cheryl later tells Walter that Hendricks misunderstands the song, as "it’s about courage and venturing into the unknown".

The song is featured in a crucial scene in which Mitty decides to leap onto a helicopter after imagining Cheryl singing the song. Stiller talked about the importance of "Space Oddity" in that scene during an interview in which he said that, "I felt like the way it fits into the story, we got to this point and this scene which was sort of how the fantasy and reality come together for Walter, and that was what that came out of. That song, and what he mentioned in his head, and what he imagines and what he does, it all just seemed to come together over that song."

== See also ==
- Red pill and blue pill – metaphor paralleled with the choice of a red car or blue car at the airport in Greenland
