= Deep Cuts (The Knife album) =

2003 studio album by the Knife

Studio album by The Knife
- Released: 17 January 2003
- Recorded: January, June, September and October 2002 in Stockholm
- Genre: Synth-pop; electropop; dance-pop; Europop
- Length: 44:58
- Label: Rabid
- Producer: The Knife

The Knife chronology
The Knife (2001)	Deep Cuts (2003)	Hannah med H Soundtrack (2003)

Singles from Deep Cuts
- 1. "Got 2 Let U" Released: 6 May 2002; 2. "Heartbeats" Released: 27 December 2002; 3. "You Take My Breath Away" Released: 28 March 2003; 4. "Pass This On" Released: 13 June 2005

Deep Cuts is the second studio album by Swedish electronic music duo the Knife. It was released on 17 January 2003 by Rabid Records. The 2004 version contains three additional tracks (taken from Hannah med H Soundtrack) and is packaged with a DVD containing music videos. On 31 October 2006, Mute Records issued Deep Cuts and the Knife's eponymous debut album in the United States, marking the first US release of both albums. The album spawned the singles "Heartbeats", "You Take My Breath Away" and "Pass This On".

== Critical reception ==
Professional ratings
Review scores
Source	Rating
AllMusic	4/5 stars
DIY	3.5/5 stars
The Guardian	3/5 stars
Hot Press	9/10
The Irish Times	3/5 stars
Pitchfork	7.6/10
Rolling Stone	3/5 stars
Stylus Magazine	B+
The Sunday Times	4/5 stars
Uncut	3/5 stars

Deep Cuts received critical acclaim. Danielle Brigham of Hot Press compared it to a "soundtrack to a futuristic film that was made in the '80s", saying that "the synths, the drum machines and even the vocals – are distinctly retro but always put to imaginative use." Karin's way of singing was described as "mix of subtlety and parody".

Q included Deep Cuts at number 56 on their "Top 100 Albums of the 2000s" list in 2009.

In 2013, Swedish magazine Sonic placed the album at number four on their list of the "100 Best Swedish Albums Ever". The list was compiled by 150 musicians, journalists and music industry insiders.

== Track listing ==
All tracks are written by the Knife, except where noted.

Swedish and 2007 UK edition
No.	Title	Length
1.	"Heartbeats"	3:52
2.	"Girls' Night Out"	3:39
3.	"Pass This On"	3:49
4.	"One for You"	3:48
5.	"The Cop"	0:44
6.	"Listen Now"	2:50
7.	"She's Having a Baby"	2:10
8.	"You Take My Breath Away" (writers: The Knife, Jenny Wilson)	4:27
9.	"Rock Classics"	4:57
10.	"Is It Medicine"	2:23
11.	"You Make Me Like Charity"	3:06
12.	"Got 2 Let U"	4:00
13.	"Behind the Bushes"	4:15
14.	"Hangin' Out"	0:58

European, Australian and iTunes Store bonus tracks
No.	Title	Length
15.	"This Is Now"	3:55
16.	"Handy-Man"	2:40
17.	"The Bridge"	3:51

=== Swedish and European special edition ===
Bonus tracks
No.	Title	Length
15.	"This Is Now"	3:55
16.	"Handy-Man"	2:40
17.	"The Bridge"	3:51

Bonus DVD
No.	Title	Length
1.	"Handy-Man"
2.	"Pass This On"
3.	"You Take My Breath Away (I)"
4.	"Heartbeats"
5.	"N.Y. Hotel"

=== 2006 UK special edition ===
Bonus tracks
No.	Title	Length
15.	"This Is Now"	3:55
16.	"Handy-Man"	2:40
17.	"The Bridge"	3:51

Bonus DVD
No.	Title	Length
1.	"N.Y. Hotel"
2.	"Heartbeats"
3.	"You Take My Breath Away (I)"
4.	"Handy-Man"
5.	"Pass This On"
6.	"You Take My Breath Away (II)"
7.	"When I Found The Knife" (story by Frau Rabid, animation by Vardag)

=== US edition ===
Bonus tracks
No.	Title	Length
15.	"This Is Now"	3:55
16.	"Handy-Man"	2:40
17.	"The Bridge"	3:51
18.	"Pass This On" (Dahlbäck and Dahlbäck Remix)	5:32
19.	"Heartbeats" (Rex the Dog Remix)	6:12
20.	"You Take My Breath Away" (Mylo Remix; writers: The Knife, Wilson)	7:12

Bonus DVD
No.	Title	Length
1.	"When I Found The Knife"
2.	"You Take My Breath Away (II)"
3.	"Handy-Man"
4.	"Pass This On"
5.	"You Take My Breath Away (I)"
6.	"Heartbeats"
7.	"N.Y. Hotel"

== Personnel ==
Credits adapted from the liner notes of Deep Cuts.

- The Knife – recording, production, mixing, cover design
- Jenny Wilson – vocals (track 8)
- Kalle Lekholm – French horn (track 13)
- Christoffer Berg – mixing (tracks 1–4, 6–13)
- Henrik Jonsson – mastering
- Kristian Andersson – hardware supervision
- Elin Berge – photo

== Charts ==
=== Weekly charts ===
Chart (2004)	Peak position
Australian Dance Albums (ARIA)	25
Swedish Albums (Sverigetopplistan)	11

=== Year-end charts ===
Chart (2003)	Position
Swedish Albums (Sverigetopplistan)	63

== Certifications ==
Region	Certification	Certified units/sales
Sweden (GLF)	Gold	30,000^{^}
^{^} Shipments figures based on certification alone.

== Release history ==
Region	Date	Edition	Format	Ref.
Sweden	17 January 2003	CD; digital download	Rabid	
Sweden	11 October 2004	CD + DVD	Rabid	
United Kingdom	11 October 2004	CD + DVD	V2	
Germany	24 January 2005	CD + DVD	V2	
Germany	8 March 2006	CD; digital download	V2	
United Kingdom	28 August 2006	CD + DVD	Brille	
United States	31 October 2006	CD + DVD	Mute	
United Kingdom	30 April 2007	CD	Brille	
United Kingdom	10 December 2012	LP	Brille	
United States	28 October 2013	LP + CD	Brille	
Australia	2 December 2013	LP + CD	Warner	
