= Junip (album) =

Studio album by Junip
- Released: April 23, 2013
- Recorded: 2011–2012
- Genre: Indie rock, psychedelic rock
- Length: 42:39
- Label: City Slang, Mute

Junip chronology
Fields (2010)	Junip (2013)

Junip is the second studio album by Swedish indie rock band Junip. The album was released on April 22, 2013, on City Slang (Europe) and the following day on Mute (North America).

== Critical reception ==
Professional ratings
Aggregate scores
Source	Rating
Metacritic	(76/100)
Review scores
Source	Rating
Allmusic	4/5 stars
Clash	6/10
FILTER	83%
The Independent	4/5 stars
musicOMH	4/5 stars
Now	4/5 stars
Pitchfork	7.0/10
PopMatters	6/10 stars
Rolling Stone	3.5/5 stars
Under the Radar	7.5/10 stars

Junip received mostly positive reviews from music critics. At Metacritic, which assigns a weighted average score out of 100 to reviews from mainstream critics, the album received a metascore of 76, based on 17 reviews. At FILTER, Zach Kraimer highlighted how this album like their last "finds them occupying the same melancholy, earnest spaces", and told that the band "have since outgrown some restrictive boundaries." Heather Phares of Allmusic called the release "even more of a grower" than their previous offering, which is done "in more ways than one", such as "bigger arrangements and productions" and in their songwriting. The Independent's Holly Williams found that the album "still resides in the folktronica zone", which Williams noted the album "can be plodding and takes a while to get going, but also occasionally reaches soaring, festival-fields-at-dusk heights."

Christopher Monk at musicOMH alluded to how "Junip isn’t a flashy album", yet still vowed that the album is "lovely stuff." Christine Werthman of CMJ emphasized that "the sounds are bigger on Junip," and stressed that "it’s the audible give and take among the performers this time that makes the album intimate." The Quietus' Ryan Foley commented that if you like when "Gonzalez's intricate, mellifluous guitar playing is not front and center," that the "committed followers of this side of his artistry will certainly be satisfied."

At Under the Radar, Laura Studarus evoked how "less is more-or so the saying goes" because "when the trio pulls back, they almost consistently find their sweet spot." Pitchfork's Stephen M. Deusner told that "there’s nothing quite so streamlined or quite so dramatic on Junip, yet "there’s also nothing to suggest the band is flailing. Mainly they simply keep on chugging." In addition, Deusner affirmed that "what worked on Fields works just as well here; what didn't still doesn't; and constancy may be the band's greatest weakness", and noted how that "Ultimately, Junip keep their distance, offering a comforting hand on your shoulder rather than a full and unreserved embrace." At Rolling Stone, Jon Dolan noted that Junip finds "something creepily beautiful down every one of theirs."

James Evans of Clash found that "at their best though, Junip's exotic folk gems have a slow-burning charm and are an impressive step forward from Gonzalez's easy listening cover versions." At Now, Benjamin Boles equivocated that the release is "all very easy to listen to, but occasionally too close to easy listening." PopMatters' Benjamin Aspray told that "the rest of Junip never quite matches its first track" and highlighted that the release "faces the line of fire, only to step back." At This Is Fake DIY, Greg Inglis affirmed that "despite the occasional smattering of experimentation there is little if any progression from their previous material" however "whilst there are a couple of noteworthy exceptions there is simply too much here that simply slips into background music fodder."

== Track listing ==
All tracks are written by Junip (José González, Tobias Winterkorn and Elias Araya).

No.	Title	Length
1.	"Line of Fire"	5:39
2.	"Suddenly"	3:26
3.	"So Clear"	4:45
4.	"Your Life, Your Call"	4:07
5.	"Villain"	1:58
6.	"Walking Lightly"	5:43
7.	"Head First"	2:37
8.	"Baton"	3:44
9.	"Beginnings"	5:00
10.	"After All Is Said and Done"	5:40

== Personnel ==
All instruments played by Elias Araya, José González, Tobias Winterkorn and Don Alsterberg except tambourine on 6 played by Håkan Wirenstrand.

== In media ==
The song "Line of Fire" was used in commercials for the series finale of Breaking Bad. The song was also featured in season 1, episode 11 of The Blacklist and in season 1, episode 17 of The Originals. It's also used in episode S01E18 of "Elementary".

The song "After All Is Said And Done" was used as a soundscape in episode 2 of The Blacklist:-Redemption.

The song "Walking Lightly" has been adapted for use by fans of Notts County FC, the changed verses being: "We are, Notts County! We are, Notts County! Near or far, here we are! Notts County!"
