= Vestiges & Claws =

Studio album by José González
- Released: 17 February 2015
- Length: 42:13
- Label: Mute
- Producer: José González

José González chronology
In Our Nature (2007)	Vestiges & Claws (2015)	Local Valley (2021)

Singles from Vestiges & Claws
- 1. "Every Age"; 2. "Leaf Off/The Cave"

Vestiges & Claws is the third album by Swedish singer-songwriter José González, released on 17 February 2015 by Mute Records. It follows In Our Nature (2007).

The album was a commercial success and was also well received by critics. It won an IMPALA Silver Sales Award and won the IMPALA Album of the Year Award.

== Critical reception ==
Professional ratings
Aggregate scores
Source	Rating
Metacritic	74/100
Review scores
Source	Rating
AllMusic	4.5/5 stars
Consequence of Sound	B
Drowned in Sound	8/10
MusicOMH	3/5 stars
NME	8/10
Paste	7.7/10
Pitchfork	6.6/10
PopMatters	7/10
Rolling Stone	3/5 stars
Spin	7/10

At Metacritic, which assigns a normalized rating out of 100 to reviews from mainstream critics, the album has an average score of 74, based on 25 reviews, which indicates "generally favorable reviews".

Matt Collar of AllMusic praised the album, stating, "These are incredibly moving songs full of bittersweet asides that strike you at first with their haiku-like simplicity, only to draw you deeper into González's iceberg of ideas. Ultimately, it's this ability to stop you in your tracks and hold you with the warmth of his voice as you contemplate your existence that makes Vestiges & Claws such an arresting, uplifting joy." Anna Byrne of Drowned in Sound gave the album a favorable review, stating, "Although the themes in the album vary hugely – uncertainty, fear, hope, regret – the quality and confidence of the music is consistent. It's heartening that there are no covers on this album – a first for González. With Vestiges & Claws, he is embracing his own style, his musical expertise, his lyrical prowess – without any hint of hesitance or the feeling that, in order to make a great record, he needs to feature what's already familiar."

Andy Baber of musicOMH was more critical of the album, stating, "Ultimately, Vestiges & Claws is a solid return from González. In many ways, it is his most confident and personal record – with the covers that have previously featured on his last two LPs noticeably absent here – and he explores some interesting concepts over the 10 tracks. Whether it will get the attention of his previous work is another question, though, as without a distinctive cover, his comforting, low-key style can at times become repetitive and forgettable." Ian Cohen of Pitchfork gave the album an average review, stating, "Even when Vestiges & Claws exudes strain, González never gives the impression of truly challenging himself. When he draws on the canons of both ancient philosophy and post-punk, he sounds like José González. Whether covering Massive Attack, Bruce Springsteen, or Low, he sounds like José González. Even when fronting a legitimate, kraut-influenced rock band in Junip, it just sounds like José González with the rhythmic tracework of his solo albums filled in. But as a record that so frequently meditates on unchanging human nature, that could just mean Vestiges & Claws achieved exactly what it set out to do."

== Track listing ==
All tracks are written by José González.

No.	Title	Length
1.	"With the Ink of a Ghost"	5:18
2.	"Let It Carry You"	5:34
3.	"Stories We Build, Stories We Tell"	3:25
4.	"The Forest"	3:20
5.	"Leaf Off/The Cave"	4:53
6.	"Every Age"	3:10
7.	"What Will"	6:27
8.	"Vissel"	3:44
9.	"Afterglow"	3:42
10.	"Open Book"	2:40

== Charts ==
Chart (2015)	Peak position
Australian Albums (ARIA)	34
Austrian Albums (Ö3 Austria)	58
Belgian Albums (Ultratop Flanders)	79
Belgian Albums (Ultratop Wallonia)	114
Dutch Albums (Album Top 100)	86
German Albums (Offizielle Top 100)	55
Swedish Albums (Sverigetopplistan)	7
Swiss Albums (Schweizer Hitparade)	44
US Billboard 200	72
