= In Our Nature (José González album) =

Studio album by José González
- Released: 24 September 2007
- Recorded: 2006–2007
- Genres: Indie rock, folk rock
- Length: 33:08
- Label: Mute
- Producer: José González

José González chronology
Veneer (2003)	In Our Nature (2007)	Vestiges & Claws (2015)

Professional ratings
Aggregate scores
Source	Rating
Metacritic	72/100
Review scores
Source	Rating
AllMusic	3.5/5 stars
The A.V. Club	B+
Dotmusic	8/10
Drowned in Sound	7/10
Mojo	3/5 stars
MusicOMH	3.5/5 stars
Now	4/5 stars
Pitchfork	7.8/10
Stylus	B
Uncut	8/10

In Our Nature is the second studio album by Swedish singer-songwriter José González. It was released on September 24 2007 on Peacefrog Records in the UK and Imperial Recordings in Sweden. It was released on September 25 2007 by Mute Records in the United States. The album received generally positive reviews from critics: on Metacritic, it has a score of 72 out of 100 based on 27 reviews, indicating "generally favourable reviews".

The album's lyrics address the human condition, or the nature that the title refers to. Though the sonic palette features classical guitar and vocal melody, as in his debut Veneer, it is occasionally expanded. Hand claps, backing vocals and synthesizer are some notable additions.

In Sweden, the first single was "Killing for Love", whereas in the rest of Europe it was "Down the Line". Both singles came with the same B-side, a cover of "Smalltown Boy" by Bronski Beat. The second single released was "Teardrop" (backed with the exclusive instrumental B-side "Four Forks Ache"), and the third single was another split--"Killing for Love" in the UK, and "Down the Line" in Sweden. Both singles came with the same B-side, "Neon Lights".

== Track listing ==
All tracks are written by José González, except where noted.

Standard edition
No.	Title	Writer(s)	Length
1.	"How Low"		2:40
2.	"Down the Line"		3:11
3.	"Killing for Love"		3:03
4.	"In Our Nature"		2:43
5.	"Teardrop"	Robert Del Naja; Grant Marshall; Andrew Vowles; Elizabeth Fraser	3:33
6.	"Abram"		1:48
7.	"Time to Send Someone Away"	González; Matthias Bergqvist	2:48
8.	"The Nest"	González; Yukimi Nagano	2:24
9.	"Fold"		2:55
10.	"Cycling Trivialities"		8:09

iTunes digital edition
No.	Title	Length
11.	"You're an Animal"	4:18

== Singles ==
- "Down the Line" (10 September 2007) (UK)
- "Killing for Love" (19 September 2007) (Sweden)
- "Teardrop" (12 November 2007)
- "Down the Line" (20 February 2008) (Sweden)
- "Killing for Love" (7 April 2008) (UK)

== Remix EP ==
1. "Killing for Love" (Todd Terje Brokeback Mix)
2. "How Low" (Pechenga Nord-Norska Mix)
3. "Killing for Love" (Beatfanatic Remix)
4. "In Our Nature" (Landberg & Skogehall Mix)
5. "Storm" (Pocketknife's TuBa 303 Remix)

== Personnel ==
- José González – vocals, guitar
- Yukimi Nagano – backing vocals
- Erik Bodin – percussion
- Håkan Wirenstrand – synthesiser

== Charts ==
=== Weekly charts ===
Chart (2007)	Peak position
Australian Albums (ARIA)	11
Belgian Albums (Ultratop Flanders)	33
Dutch Albums (Album Top 100)	69
Finnish Albums (Suomen virallinen lista)	25
French Albums (SNEP)	126
New Zealand Albums (RMNZ)	32
Swedish Albums (Sverigetopplistan)	8
UK Albums (Official Charts)	19
US Billboard 200	132

=== Year-end charts ===
Chart (2007)	Position
Swedish Albums (Sverigetopplistan)	98

== Certifications ==
Region	Certification	Certified units/sales
Australia (ARIA)	Gold	35,000^{^}
United Kingdom (BPI)	Silver	60,000^{‡}
^{^} Shipments figures based on certification alone.^{‡} Sales+streaming figures based on certification alone.
