= Rope and Summit =

EP by Junip
- Released: May 28, 2010
- Genre: Indie, folk, Krautrock
- Length: 21:34
- Label: City Slang

Rope and Summit is an EP by Swedish band Junip. It was released freely online ahead of the release of the band's first full-length album, five years after their previous EP went on sale.

== Track listing ==
1. "Rope and Summit" – 5:26
2. "Far Away" – 2:44
3. "At the Doors" – 8:18
4. "Loops" – 5:06

== Personnel ==
- Elias Araya – drums
- José González – vocals, guitar
- Tobias Winterkorn – organ, Moog synthesizer
