= José González (singer) =

Swedish musician (born 1978)

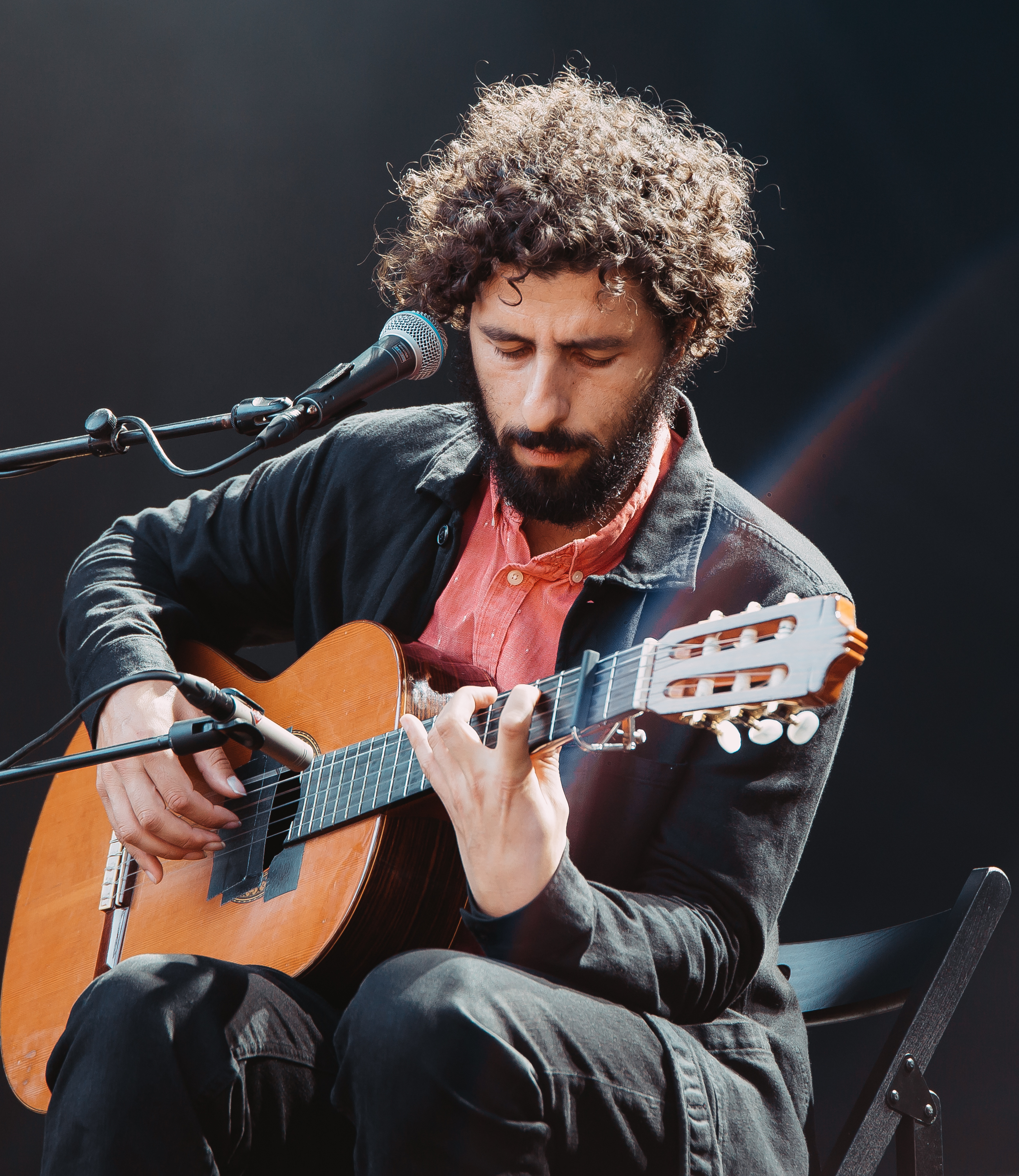
- González performing in 2017

Background information
- Born: José Gabriel González; 31 July 1978 (age 48); Gothenburg, Sweden
- Genre: Indie folk
- Occupation: Singer-songwriter
- Instruments: Guitar; vocals; bass; piano; percussion
- Years active: 1993–present
- Labels: Imperial; Parasol; Mute; Peacefrog; City Slang; Love Da Records
- Member of: Junip
- Formerly of: Back Against the Wall; Renascence; Only If You Call Me Jonathan
- Website: jose-gonzalez.com

José Gabriel González (born 31 July 1978) is a Swedish indie folk singer-songwriter and guitarist from Gothenburg. He is also a member of the band Junip, along with Tobias Winterkorn. As of 2026, he has released five solo studio albums.

== Early life and education ==
José Gabriel González was born on 31 July 1978 in the Haga district of Gothenburg, Sweden, to Argentine parents. His politically active parents were students at the National University of San Luis before fleeing Argentina after the 1976 Argentine coup d'état. Escaping to Brazil with González's older sister, they were granted asylum by the Swedish consulate in Rio de Janeiro and relocated to Gothenburg in 1977.

González grew up listening to Latin folk and pop music and has named Cuban singer-songwriter Silvio Rodríguez as a favourite artist. He said that the first concert he went to was the Wailers. In an interview with Time Out magazine he stated, "I got their autographs and everything. I was about 12 or so. At the time, my favourite music was Bob Marley and Michael Jackson".

González earned a master's degree in molecular biology from the University of Gothenburg and was in a PhD program for biochemistry before dropping out and focusing on music.

== Career ==
The first band González played in was Back Against the Wall, a Gothenburg hardcore punk group influenced by Black Flag, Misfits, and Dead Kennedys. He later played bass guitar in another hardcore band, Renascence, between 1993 and 1998. He also played guitar with the indie rock band Only If You Call Me Jonathan.

In June 2003, González issued his debut solo release, a two-track 7 in (180 mm) single. It was discovered by Joakim Gävert, co-founder of the then-fledgling label Imperial Records, who signed González as their first official artist. In October, González released his debut album, Veneer, in Europe. The record was subsequently released in the UK on 25 April 2005 and in the United States on 6 September 2005. González had begun working on the material while still a PhD student.

González' trademark sound is solo classical guitar with soft vocal melody. His work, although mostly original, also includes acoustic covers of such hits as "Heartbeats" by his fellow Swedes the Knife, "Love Will Tear Us Apart" by Joy Division, "Born in the U.S.A." and "The Ghost of Tom Joad" by Bruce Springsteen, "Hand on Your Heart" by Kylie Minogue, "Smalltown Boy" by Bronski Beat, "Teardrop" by Massive Attack, and "Last Snowstorm of the Year" by Low.

His second album, In Our Nature, was released internationally on 22 September 2007. Its lyrical content was in part influenced by books like The God Delusion by evolutionary biologist Richard Dawkins and Practical Ethics by ethicist Peter Singer.

In 2010, a documentary about him, called The Extraordinary Ordinary Life of Jose Gonzalez, was released.

His third album, Vestiges & Claws, was released in February 2015. It was critically acclaimed and received the IMPALA Album of the Year Award.

On 17 February 2021, González released a single with Spanish lyrics, "El Invento". In April, he issued "Visions", the second single from his next album, Local Valley, which came out on 17 September.

In 2023, González appeared in the feature film A Tiger in Paradise, which is a fictionalized depiction of his own life.

In 2026, he released his fifth album, Against the Dying of the Light.

== Collaborations and soundtrack appearances ==
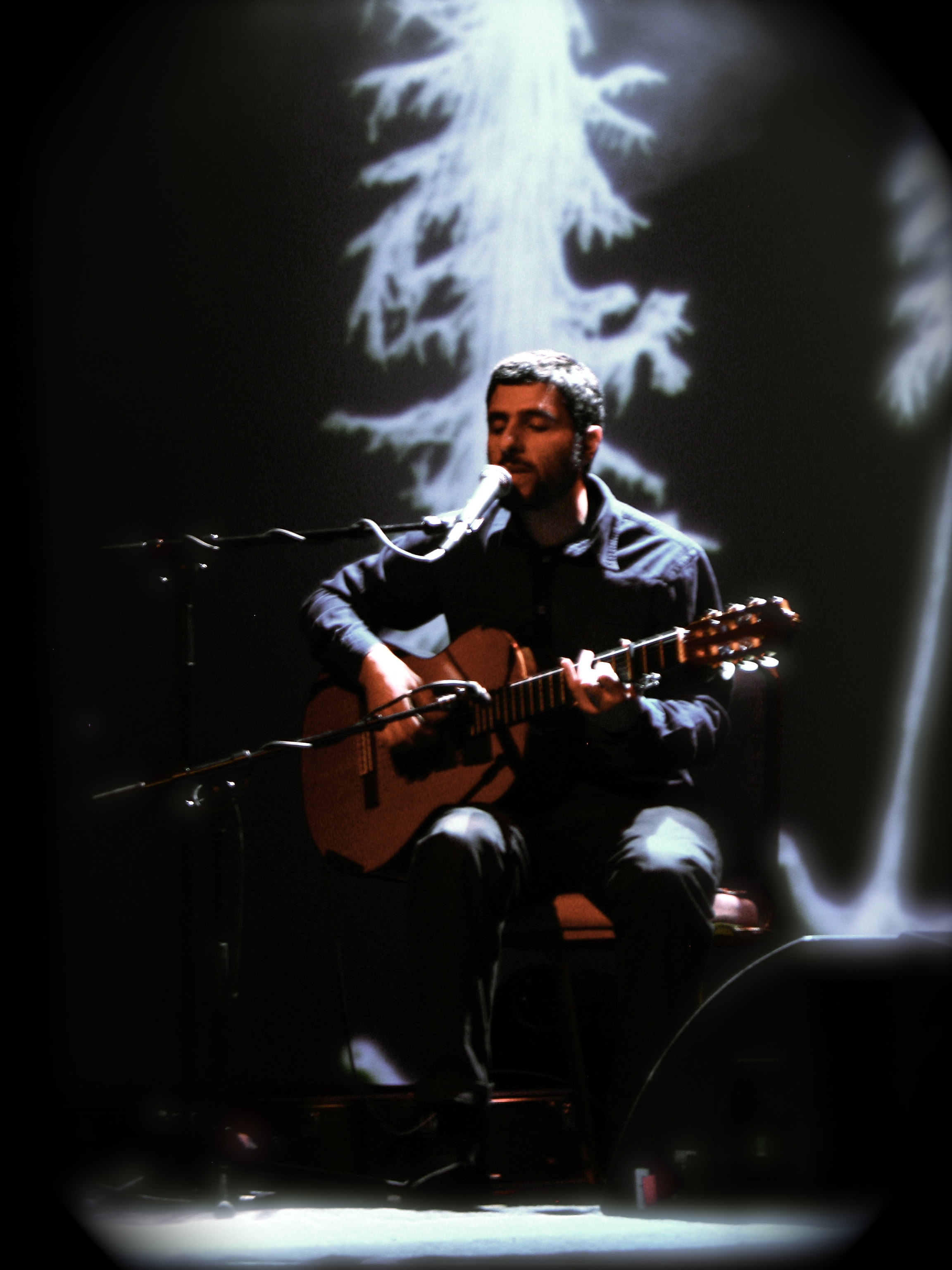
José González performing at O2 Shepherds Bush Empire in London, UK, April 2008

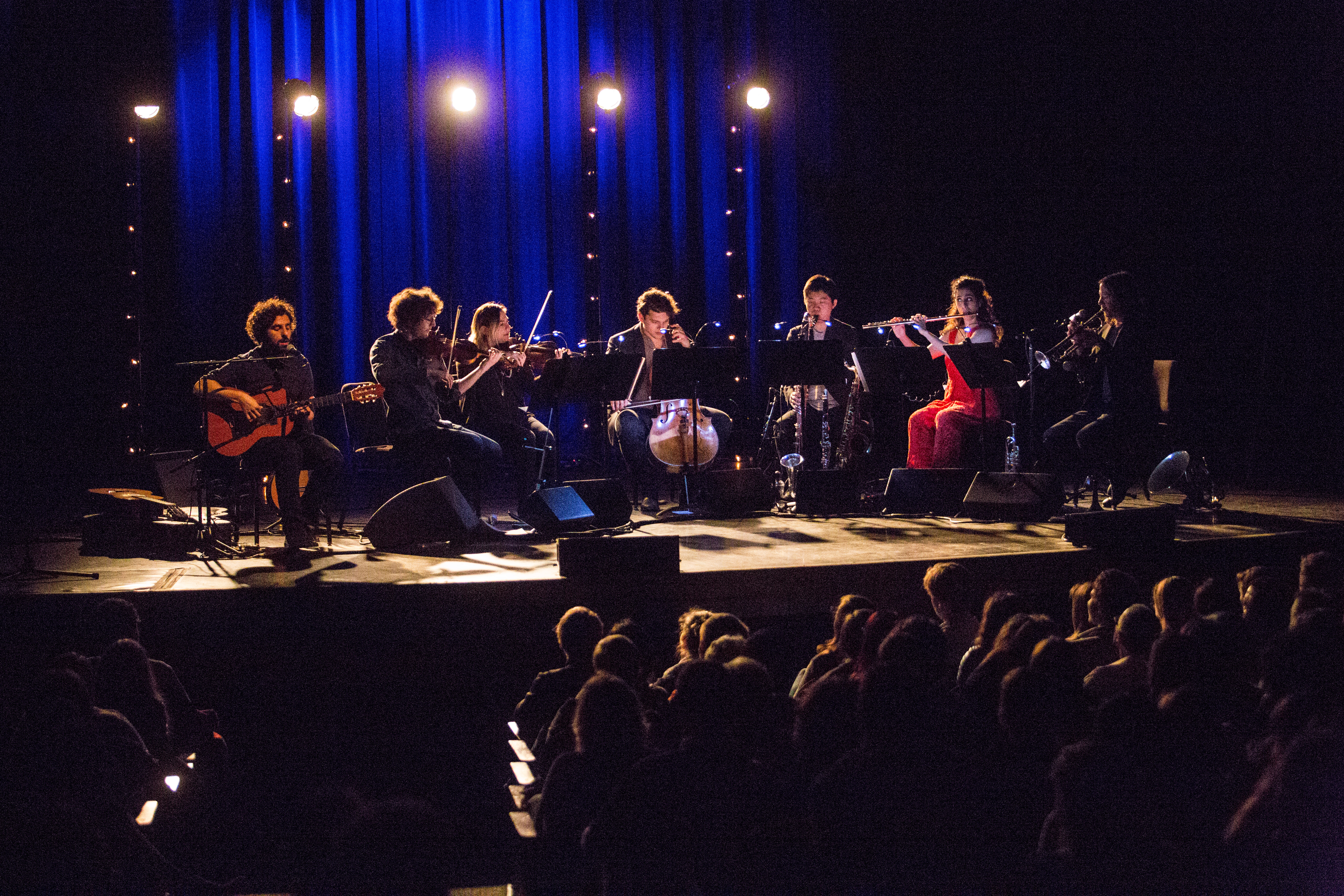
González performing with chamber pop group yMusic in 2016

González plays in the band Junip with Tobias Winterkorn (and previously Elias Araya). To date, they have released two EPs, Black Refuge and the free internet release Rope and Summit, along with two full-length albums, Fields and Junip.

He collaborated with UK downtempo duo Zero 7 on their 2006 album, The Garden, providing guest vocals, along with Zero 7 regular Sia. González performs vocals on four songs: "Futures", "Left Behind", "Today", and "Crosses". The latter sampled by British hip-hop artist Plan B on the song "Cast a Light", which appears on the Paint It Blacker EP.

González collaborated with Finnish house DJ Jori Hulkkonen on the track "Blinded by the Numbers", from Hulkkonen's 2005 album, Dualizm. He has also worked with the Swedish hip-hop DJ and producer Embee, on the track "Send Someone Away".

González collaborated with the Books on Red Hot Organization's Dark Was the Night compilation album, fundraising for HIV and AIDS awareness, which was released in February 2009. In 2011, he collaborated with Mia Doi Todd on a cover of "Um Girassol da Cor do Seu Cabelo" for the organization's album Red Hot + Rio 2.

González participated in the Göteborg String Theory project in 2009–2011, an experimental music and art project that involved artists from Gothenburg and classical composers from Berlin, Germany. A new sound piece of his song "Cycling Trivialities" was arranged by composer Nackt for a classical orchestra. It was recorded and performed together with González and finally released on the album The Göteborg String Theory Album, in April 2010. González continued his collaboration with the Göteborg String Theory in 2011. Nackt wrote eleven new arrangements for González' songs, and in spring 2011, González and the group went on a European tour of 19 cities.

In 2026, González collaborated with Tinariwen on a track for their album Hoggar.

His cover of the Knife's "Heartbeats" has been used numerous times in media. His music features prominently on the soundtrack to Ben Stiller's 2013 film The Secret Life of Walter Mitty, as do a few tracks by Junip.

== Personal life ==
González is in a long-term relationship with his partner, Swedish designer Hannele Fernström, with whom he has a daughter, born in 2017. González is an atheist and a vegan.

A firm believer in effective altruism, since August 2017, González has been a member of Giving What We Can, a community of people who have pledged to give at least 10% of their income to charities.

== Awards ==
- Grammis, Newcomer of the Year for Veneer (2004)
- Swedish government music export award (2006)
- Virgin Media Music Awards, Best Single for "Heartbeats" (nominated) (2006)
- European Border Breakers Award for Veneer (2007)

== Discography ==
=== Studio albums ===
List of studio albums, with selected chart positions and certifications
Title	Album details	Peak chart positions										Certifications
Title	Album details	SWE	AUS	BEL	GER	IRE	NLD	NZ	SWI	UK	US	Certifications
Veneer	Released: 29 October 2003; Label: Imperial; Formats: CD, LP, digital download	2	52	28	—	2	46	11	—	7	—	IFPI SWE: Platinum; ARIA: Gold; BPI: Platinum; RMNZ: Platinum
In Our Nature	Released: 25 September 2007; Label: Imperial / Mute; Formats: CD, LP, digital download	8	11	33	—	26	69	32	—	19	132	ARIA: Gold; BPI: Silver
Vestiges & Claws	Released: 17 February 2015; Label: Imperial / Mute; Formats: CD, LP, digital download, streaming	7	34	79	55	99	86	—	44	49	72	
Local Valley	Released: 17 September 2021; Label: City Slang / Mute; Formats: CD, LP, digital download, streaming	25	—	72	20	—	— (Note: Local Valley did not enter the Dutch Album Top 100 but entered the Dutch Vinyl 33 chart at number 28.)	—	41	— (Note: Local Valley did not enter the UK Albums Chart but peaked at number 89 on the UK Album Downloads Chart.)	— (Note: Local Valley did not enter the US Billboard 200 but peaked at number 29 on the US Billboard Album Sales Chart.)	
Against the Dying of the Light	Released: 27 March 2026; Label: City Slang; Formats: CD, LP, digital download, streaming	—	—	113	—	—	—	—	—	—	—	
"—" denotes a recording that did not chart or was not released in that territory.

=== Live albums ===
List of live albums
Title	Album details
Live in Europe	Released: 22 February 2019; Label: Imperial / Mute; Formats: CD, LP, digital download; Featured artists: String Theory

=== EPs ===
List of extended plays
Title	EP details	Peak chart positions
Title	EP details	SWE
Crosses	Released: 11 June 2003; Label: Imperial; Formats: CD	4
José González & Jens Lekman Split Tour Single	Released: December 2003; Label: Imperial; Formats: CD	—
Remain	Released: 21 January 2004; Label: Imperial; Formats: CD	28
Stay in the Shade	Released: 23 June 2004; Label: Imperial; Formats: CD	48
Australian Tour EP	Released: 14 November 2005; Label: Imperial; Formats: CD	—
B-Sides Collected	Released: November 2006; Label: Imperial; Formats: CD	—
3 EP Collection	Released: September 2007; Label: Mute; Formats: CD	—
José González & Promise and the Monster Split Tour Single	Released: December 2007; Label: Mute; Formats: CD	—
"—" denotes a recording that did not chart or was not released in that territory.

=== Singles ===
List of singles, with selected chart positions and certifications
Title	Year	Peak chart positions										Certifications	Album
Title	Year	SWE	AUS	BEL	EUR	IRE	NLD	POL	SCO	UK	US Rock	Certifications	Album
"Remain"	2004	28	—	—	—	—	—	—	—	—	—		Veneer
"Stay in the Shade"	2005	48	—	—	—	—	—	—	—	—	—		Veneer
"Heartbeats"	2006	— (Note: "Heartbeats" did not enter the Sverigetopplistan Top 100 Singles chart but peaked at number 10 on the Sverigetopplistan Heatseeker chart.)	45	20	9	12	56	1	6	9	—	BPI: 2× Platinum	Veneer
"Crosses"	2006	4	—	—	—	—	—	—	56	107	—		Veneer
"Hand on Your Heart"	2006	—	88	—	—	—	—	—	21	29	—		Non-album single
"Down the Line"	2007	—	—	—	—	—	—	—	88	140	—		In Our Nature
"Killing for Love"	2007	—	—	—	—	—	—	—	—	—	—		In Our Nature
"Teardrop"	2007	—	—	—	—	—	—	—	—	—	—		In Our Nature
"Cycling Trivialities"	2009	—	—	—	—	—	—	—	—	—	—		In Our Nature
"Step Out"	2014	—	—	—	—	—	—	—	—	—	43		The Secret Life of Walter Mitty
"Stay Alive"	2014	—	— (Note: "Stay Alive" did not enter the Australian ARIA Singles Chart but peaked at number 10 on the ARIA Hitseekers Chart.)	—	—	—	—	—	—	—	45	BPI: Silver	The Secret Life of Walter Mitty
"Every Age"	2014	—	—	—	—	—	—	—	—	—	—		Vestiges & Claws
"Leaf Off/The Cave"	2015	—	—	—	—	—	—	—	—	—	—		Vestiges & Claws
"Open Book"	2015	—	—	—	—	—	—	—	—	—	—		Vestiges & Claws
"Let It Carry You"	2015	—	—	—	—	—	—	—	—	—	—		Vestiges & Claws
"With the Ink of a Ghost"	2016	—	—	—	—	—	—	—	—	—	—		Vestiges & Claws
"El Invento"	2021	—	—	— (Note: "El Invento" did not enter the Ultratop 50 but peaked at number 40 on the Flemish Ultratip chart.)	—	—	—	—	—	—	—		Local Valley
"Visions"	2021	—	—	— (Note: "Visions" did not enter the Ultratop 50 but charted as an extra tip on the Flemish Ultratip chart.)	—	—	—	—	—	—	—		Local Valley
"Head On"	2021	—	—	—	—	—	—	—	—	—	—		Local Valley
"Swing"	2021	—	—	—	—	—	—	—	—	—	—		Local Valley
"—" denotes a recording that did not chart or was not released in that territory.

=== Other charted songs ===
Title	Year	Peak chart positions	Album
Title	Year	UK Indie	Album
"In Our Nature"	2007	48	In Our Nature

=== Other contributions ===
- Acoustic 05 – "Broken Arrows" (2005)
- Chillout Sessions 9 – "Heartbeats" (2006)
- The Acoustic Album – "Heartbeats" (2006)
- Acoustic 07 – "Lovestain" (2007)
- Chillout Sessions 10 – "Down the Line" (2007)
- Chillout Sessions XI – "Teardrop" (2008)
- Dark Was the Night – featured on the Books' cover of Nick Drake's "Cello Song" (2009)
- Uncovered – "Love Will Tear Us Apart" (2009)
- Red Dead Redemption Original Soundtrack – "Far Away" (2010)
- Record, Zero 7 – "Futures – Feat. Jose Gonzalez" (2010)
- The Göteborg String Theory Album – "Cycling Trivialities" (2010)
- It All Starts with One, Ane Brun – "Worship" (2011)
- The Secret Life of Walter Mitty Soundtrack – "Step Out", "Stay Alive", "#9 Dream" (2013)
- Master Mix: Red Hot + Arthur Russell – "This Is How We Walk on the Moon" (2014)
- Life Is Strange –"Crosses" (2015)
- Looking for Alaska – "Crosses" (2019)
