= Junip =

Swedish rock duo

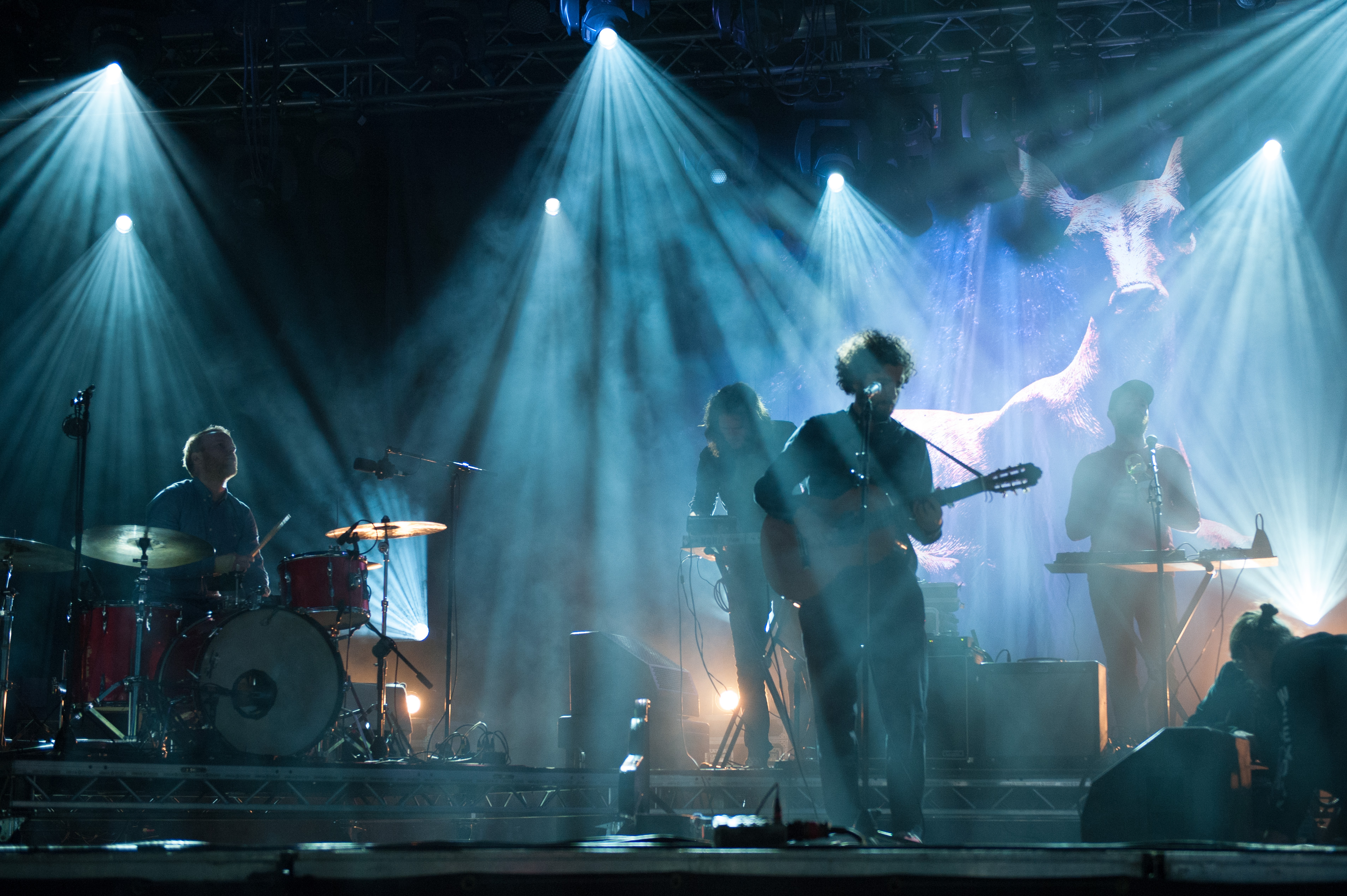
- Junip performing in 2013 at Gothenburg

Background information
- Origin: Gothenburg, Sweden
- Genres: Folk rock, indie rock
- Years active: 1998–present
- Labels: Mute, City Slang, Temeshet
- Members: José González; Tobias Winterkorn
- Past members: Elias Araya
- Website: www.junip.net

Junip is a Swedish folk rock band from Gothenburg. The band is made up of the duo of José González (vocals, guitars) and Tobias Winterkorn (organ, Moog synthesizer) with various accompanying musicians in recordings and in live gigs.

== History ==
The band was formed in 1998, by childhood friends José González and Elias Araya along with Tobias Winterkorn. The group was formed as a hobby for the three, who at the time held other occupations: Winterkorn was a part-time teacher, Araya an art student and González was studying biochemistry.

In 2000 they released their first EP, Straight Lines.

The band was put on hold when, in 2003, González's solo career took off, at which time he left his studies and started touring and living from music. In 2005, the band released its second EP, Black Refuge, after which González again embarked on a solo tour.

The band released their first full-length album, Fields, in 2010. On its subsequent tour, the band's live lineup was expanded to include bass and percussion. Three years later, Junip released their self-titled second album. After the recording of the album and before going on its supporting tour, Araya left the band, being replaced on live performances by other drummers.

== In popular culture ==
Their songs "Far Away" and "Don't Let It Pass" have been used in the film The Secret Life of Walter Mitty and an acoustic version of "Far Away" has been used in the video game Red Dead Redemption. Their song "Line of Fire" was used twice in The Blacklist.

Their song "Without You" was featured in the last episode of the ABC Family series The Nine Lives of Chloe King on August 16, 2011, and on the "Rewind" episode of the USA Network series Suits on August 9, 2012. On September 22, 2013, their song "Line of Fire" was featured as the background music for a short recap of the AMC series Breaking Bad, which aired immediately after the series' penultimate episode. The song "Tide" was featured in an episode of the NBC series The Blacklist, in Episode 17 Season 1 of the CW supernatural drama The Originals and in episode 18 of season 1 of Elementary. Their music was again featured on Suits when "After All is Said and Done" was played in Season 4 Episode 3 "Two in the Knees." Furthermore, their song was also featured near the end of Episode 5 of Season 1 of Flaked. In 2016 "After All Is Said and Done" provided the backing soundtrack to the last scenes of Frequency Season 1 Episode 3.

Their song "Walking Lightly" was featured in the TV series Lethal Weapon at the end of Season 1 Episode 15 "As Good as It Getz".

== Discography ==
=== Albums ===
Year	Album	Peak positions
Year	Album	SWE
2010	Fields	41
2013	Junip	55

=== EPs ===
- Straight Lines (2000)
- Black Refuge EP (2005)
- Rope and Summit EP (2010)
- In Every Direction EP (2011)

=== Singles ===
- "Always" (2010)
- "In Every Direction" (2011)
- "Walking Lightly" (2013)
- "Line of Fire" (2013)
- "Your Life Your Call" (2013)

=== Music videos ===
- "Without You"
- "In Every Direction"
- "Your Life Your Call"
- "Line of Fire"
- "Walking Lightly"
