= Imperial Recordings =

Imperial Recordings is a Swedish record company, which notably have José González and Melpo Mene signed.

== History ==
Imperial Recordings was founded by Joakim Gävert and Magnus Bohman in 2002. Previously Gävert had overseen Grand Recordings, a sub-label of Virgin, and Bohman worked for the Scandinavian branch of Zomba Records. To help raise funds for the project the pair did consultancy work, and Gävert sold a part of his record collection and Bohman his car.

The original idea for the label was an independent focused on Sweden and Nordic territories but that "had an eye" on the world market. To this aim from the very start they had small partners worldwide. However, according to Bohman, they chose not to rush their international plans, preferring instead for the quality of the music to be the first thing to reach people.

Artists released on the label are José González, Promise and the Monster, Eskju Divine, Martin McFaul, Samuraj Cities, Melpo Mene, Gustaf Spetz, TLS, Kuriaki, Zeigeist (in co-op with Spegel) and Paper (in co-op with Novoton).

In 2006, the record company issued a sampler album Lesson No.1 including recordings by Samurai City and the roster of the label's artists.
