= Olof Dreijer =

Swedish musician (born 1981)

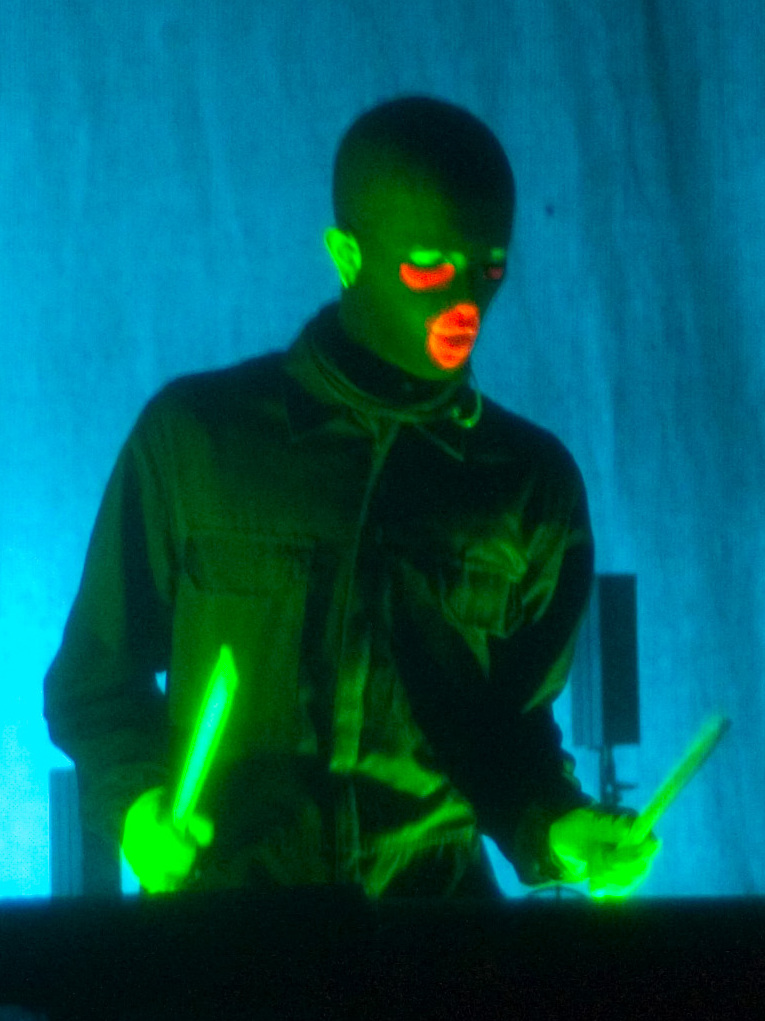
- Dreijer performing with the Knife in 2006

Background information
- Also known as: DJ Coolof; Oni Ayhun
- Born: 27 November 1981 (age 44)
- Origin: Nacka, Sweden
- Genres: Techno; house; minimal
- Occupations: Record producer; DJ
- Years active: 1999–present
- Label: Rabid
- Formerly of: The Knife

Olof Björn Dreijer (born 27 November 1981) is a Swedish DJ and record producer, best known as one half of the electronic music avant-pop duo the Knife, formed with his sibling Karin Dreijer. They disbanded in 2014 and continued to produce music collaboratively. Olof released his debut solo album, Loud Bloom, in 2026.

== Early life ==
Dreijer grew up in Gothenburg and played saxophone with his father in the local communist band.

== Career ==
In 1999, he and his sibling Karin formed the duo the Knife. He had previously worked as a kindergarten teacher, DJ, and beatmaker, before performing with the Knife full-time, and the duo released a total of four albums.

Although the Knife very rarely played live, Olof performed as DJ Coolof in nightclubs across Europe, though only at events with equal gender representation on the artist lineup—with no more than 50% people who identify as men.

In late 2009 and early 2010, Olof released four EPs under the pseudonym Oni Ayhun. In late 2010, he issued a remix of Emmanuel Jal's "Kuar". In 2011, he produced the song "Jam" by Planningtorock, from the album W.

In 2014, he and Karin disbanded the Knife, calling their final show 'Post-Colonial Gender Politics Come First, Music Comes Second'. Olof went on to produce music for his friends and taught music to undocumented migrants in Stockholm and Berlin.

In October 2023, he released the EP Rosa Rugosa, which was the first solo project under his own name and not a pseudonym.

During his performance at the 2026 BBC Radio 6 Music festival, Robyn joined him onstage in a surprise appearance.

In May 2026, Olof released his first solo album, Loud Bloom, along with the single "Echoed Dafnino", which featured the Sudanese singer MaMan.

== Political views ==
Olof has been explicit in his opposition to the Swedish far-right political movement. He has stated that the involvement of technology companies in music streaming was the "gentrification" of piracy.

Upon being asked to DJ in Tel Aviv, Dreijer stated that he supports the international cultural boycott of Israel and the BDS movement in support of Palestinian rights. Dreijer and the Knife have supported this boycott for many years.

== Discography ==
as Oni Ayhun

- OAR001 (2008)
- OAR002 (2008)
- OAR003 (2009)
- OAR004 (2010)

as Olof Dreijer

- Echoes from Mamori (EP, 2021)
- Souvenir (2023)
- Rosa Rugosa (EP, 2023)
- Coral (EP, 2024)
- Brujas with Diva Cruz (EP, 2024)
- C2C Festival 2024, Stone Island Sound: Olof Dreijer (DJ Mix) (compilation, 2024)
- Homobloc: Olof Dreijer in Manchester, Nov 9, 2024 (DJ Mix) (compilation, 2024)
- Iris (EP, 2025)
- Loud Bloom (2026)
