= 2010 Bergen International Film Festival =

Film festival edition

The 2010 Bergen International Film Festival was arranged in Bergen, Norway, 20–27 October 2010, and was the 11th edition of the festival. It featured more than 150 feature films and documentaries, and had an attendance of more than 45,000, both numbers a new record for the festival.

== Important screenings ==
For the first time, both the opening and the closing film were Norwegian productions.

Opening film

- Home for Christmas, directed by Bent Hamer, Norway

Closing film

- The Troll Hunter, directed by André Øvredal, Norway

== Films in competition ==
=== Cinema Extraordinare - In competition ===
- The Albanian, directed by Johannes Naber, Germany
- All That I Love, directed by Jacek Borcuch, Poland
- Au Revoir Taipei, directed by Arvin Chen, Taiwan
- Carancho, directed by Pablo Trapero, Argentina
- Dust, directed by Max Jacoby, Luxembourg
- Eastern Drift, directed by Šarūnas Bartas, Lithuania and Russia
- Honeymoons, directed by Goran Paskaljević, Serbia and Albania
- The Invisible Eye, directed by Diego Lerman, Argentina
- I Saw the Sun, directed by Mahsun Kırmızıgül, Turkey
- Le Quattro Volte, directed by Michelangelo Frammatino, Italy
- Life, Above All, directed by Oliver Schmitz, South Africa
- Moloch Tropical, directed by Raoul Peck, Haiti
- My Joy, directed by Sergei Loznitsa, Ukraine
- Southern District, directed by Juan Carlos Valdivia, Bolivia
- Tarda Estate, directed by Antonio Di Trapani an Marco de Angelis, Italy

=== Documentaries - In competition ===
- The Autobiography of Nicolae Ceausescu, directed by Andrei Ujică, Romania
- Bogota Change, directed by Andreas Møl Dalsgaard, Denmark
- Client 9: The Rise and Fall of Eliot Spitzer, directed by Alex Gibney, United States
- Disco and Atomic War, directed by Jaak Kilmi, Estonia
- Dreams in Copenhagen, directed by Max Kestner, Denmark
- General Orders no. 9, directed by Robert Persons, United States
- Human Terrain, directed by James Der Derian, David Udris and Michael Udris, United States
- Inside Job, directed by Charles H. Ferguson, United States
- My Perestroika, directed by Robin Hessman, United States
- Secrets of the Tribe, directed by José Padilha, Brazil and United Kingdom
- Transcendent Man, directed by Barry Ptolemy, United States
- Waiting for "Superman", directed by Davis Guggenheim, United States
- World Peace and Other 4th Grade Achievements, directed by Chris Farina, United States

=== Checkpoints - In competition ===
The Checkpoints program have existed since 2007, and is a special program focusing on human rights. In 2010, for the first time, the winner of the program was declared by a jury led by Iranian Nobel Peace Prize laureate Shirin Ebadi. The prize money, 50,000 NOK, is awarded to the people the documentary portrays and their cause, not the filmmakers.

- Bhutto, directed by Duane Baughman and Johnny O'Hara, United States
- Bogota Change, directed by Andreas Møl Dalsgaard, Denmark
- Budrus, directed by Julia Bacha, Israel
- Enemies of the People, directed by Thet Sambath and Rob Lemkin, Cambodia and United Kingdom
- Grace, Milly, Lucy, directed by Raymonde Provencher, Canada
- Hunger, directed by Marcus Vetter and Karin Steinberg, Germany
- Miss Landmine, directed by Stan Feingold, Canada
- There Once was an Island, directed by Briar March, New Zealand
- War Don Don, directed by Rebecca Richman Cohen, United States
- Waste Land, directed by Lucy Walker, Brazil and United Kingdom
- World Peace and Other 4th Grade Achievements, directed by Chris Farina, United States

=== Norwegian Short Film Competition ===
- 1987-1993, directed by Marius Dybwad Brandrud
- Akvarium, directed by Bård Røssevold
- Amor, directed by Thomas Wangsmo
- Fredag, directed by Eirik Svensson
- Jenny, directed by Ingvild Søderlind
- Travelling Fields, directed by Inger Lise Hansen
- Tuba Atlantic, directed by Hallvar Witzø

=== Scandinavias Best Music Video ===
This competition program was arranged for the first time in 2010. Music videos from both 2009 and 2010 were eligible, and nominations for the videos were made by a jury, rather than filmmakers applying for admission, as in the short film program.

- Adiam Dymott - "Miss You", directed by Senay&Kolacz, Sweden
- Casiokids - "En vill hest", directed by Kristoffer Borgli, Norway
- Donkeyboy - "Ambitions", directed by Kristoffer Borgli, Norway
- El Perro del Mar - "Change of Heart", directed by Fredrik Nilsson, Sweden
- Familjen - "Det var jag", directed by Mats Udd, Sweden
- Fever Ray - "If I Had a Heart", directed by Andreas Nilsson, Sweden
- Fever Ray - "When I Grow Up", directed by Martin de Thurah, Denmark
- Kent - "Idioter", directed by Gustav Johansson, Sweden
- Kvelertak - "Mjød", directed by Fredrik S. Hana, Norway
- Lars Vaular - "En eneste", directed by Andrew Amorim, Norway
- Lulu Rouge ft Mikael Sampson - "Bless You", directed by Jimmy Falinski Kornhauser, Denmark
- Mew - "Introducing Palace Players", directed by Martin de Thurah, Denmark
- Mew - "Repeaterbeater", directed by Martin de Thurah, Denmark
- Torgny - "The Only Game", directed by Emil Trier, Norway
- Trentemøller - "Sycamore Feeling", directed by Jesper Just, Denmark

== Awards ==
=== Cinema Extraordinare ===
- Le Quattro Volte, directed by Michelangelo Frammatino, Italy

=== The Audience Award ===
- World Peace and Other 4th Grade Achievements, directed by Chris Farina, United States

=== Best Documentary ===
- The Autobiography of Nicolae Ceausescu, directed by Andrei Ujică, Romania

=== Youth Jury's Documentary Award ===
- Bogota Change, directed by Andreas Møl Dalsgaard, Denmark

=== Checkpoints ===
- Budrus, directed by Julia Bacha, Israel

=== Best Norwegian Short Film ===
- Jenny, directed by Ingvild Søderlind

=== Best Scandinavian Music Video ===
- Torgny - "The Only Game", directed by Emil Trier, Norway

=== Young Talent Award ===
- Kedy Hassani
