= Vikings season 1 =

Season of television series

Vikings
- Season 1
- DVD cover art
- Starring: Travis Fimmel; Katheryn Winnick; Clive Standen; Jessalyn Gilsig; Gustaf Skarsgård; Gabriel Byrne; George Blagden; Donal Logue; Alyssa Sutherland
- No. of episodes: 9

Release
- Original network: History
- Original release: March 3 – April 28, 2013

Season chronology
- Next → Season 2

Vikings is a historical drama television series created and written by Michael Hirst for the Canadian television channel History. The series broadly follows the exploits of the legendary Viking chieftain Ragnar Lothbrok and his crew, and in later seasons those of his sons. The first season premiered on March 3, 2013, in Canada and concluded on April 28, 2013, consisting of nine episodes. It begins at the start of the Viking Age, marked by the Lindisfarne raid in 793, and follows Ragnar's quest to become Earl, and his desire to raid England.

== Cast ==
=== Main ===
- Travis Fimmel as Ragnar Lothbrok, a Viking farmer and warrior who yearns to raid the rumoured riches of undiscovered England
- Katheryn Winnick as Lagertha, Ragnar's wife, and a shield-maiden
- Clive Standen as Rollo, Ragnar's brother
- Jessalyn Gilsig as Siggy, Earl Haraldson's wife
- Gustaf Skarsgård as Floki, a gifted shipbuilder and Ragnar's friend
- Gabriel Byrne as Earl Haraldson, Earl of the settlement known as Kattegat, the home of Ragnar
- George Blagden as Athelstan, an Anglo-Saxon monk captured by Ragnar on his first raid in England
- Donal Logue as King Horik of Denmark
- Alyssa Sutherland as Princess Aslaug, a love interest of Ragnar, claiming to be the daughter of the valkyrie Brynhildr (Note: Alyssa Sutherland only appears in one episode of the season, although credited as a main cast member.)

=== Recurring ===
- John Kavanagh as The Seer, the seiðmann of Kattegat
- David Pearse as Svein, the loyal henchman of Earl Haraldson
- Nathan O'Toole as Bjorn Ironside, Ragnar and Lagertha's son
- Ruby O'Leary as Gyda, Ragnar and Lagertha's daughter
- Eddie Elks as Olafur, a Viking warrior in the service of Earl Haraldson
- Vladimir Kulich as Erik, elderly Viking and one of Ragnar's warriors
- Diarmaid Murtagh as Leif, one of Ragnar's warriors and the son of Erik
- Tadhg Murphy as Arne, one of Ragnar's warriors; an archer with an eye-patch.
- Jefferson Hall as Torstein, one of Ragnar's warriors and closest friends
- Jouko Ahola as Kauko, a Finnish Viking and one of Ragnar's warriors
- Eric Higgins as Knut Tjodolf, Earl Haraldson's half-brother
- Will Irvine as Brother Cenwulf, serving at the monastery of Lindisfarne
- Carrie Crowley as Elisef, wife of Erik and mother of Leif
- Sam Lucas Smith as Edwin, a Saxon
- Ivan Kaye as King Aelle of Northumbria
- Jonathon Kemp as Lord Wigea, an advisor of King Aelle
- Peter Gaynor as Lord Edgar, an advisor of King Aelle
- Elinor Crawley as Thyri, Earl Haraldson and Siggy's daughter
- Maude Hirst as Helga, Floki's woman
- Trevor Cooper as Earl Bjarni, Thyri's husband-to-be
- Angus MacInnes as Tostig, an old Viking warrior

=== Guests ===
- Eddie Drew as Odin, appearing in Ragnar's visions
- Gerard McCarthy as Brondsted, a Viking who attacks Lagertha
- Billy Gibson as Ulf, Earl Haraldson's bodyguard
- David Wilmot as Olaf Andwend
- Conor Madden as Eric Trygvasson, a Viking who is prosecuted in Kattegat by Earl Haraldson
- Donna Dent as Rafarta, a woman of Kattegat
- Cian Quinn as Olaf, son of Ingolf
- Craig Whittaker as Hakon, a Viking and one of Ragnar's men
- Des Braiden as Father Cuthbert, in charge of the monastery of Lindisfarne
- Sebastiaan Vermeul Taback as Osiric
- David Murray as Lord Aethelwulf, the brother of King Aelle
- Cathy White as Queen Ealhswith of Northumbria, King Aelle's wife
- Sean Treacy as Prince Egbert, King Aelle's son
- James Flynn as Eadric, a Saxon lord
- Thorbjørn Harr as Jarl Borg, the Jarl of Götaland
- David Michael Scott as Nils, a Viking warrior from Götaland in the service of Jarl Borg

== Episodes ==
No. overall	No. in season	Title	Directed by	Written by	Original release date
1	1	"Rites of Passage"	Johan Renck	Michael Hirst	March 3, 2013
Ragnar and his brother, Rollo, return from a battle in the Baltic lands during which Ragnar has visions of the god Odin and his valkyries. Home again, Ragnar takes his son Bjorn to Kattegat, for Bjorn's rite of passage. Left at home, Ragnar's wife Lagertha quickly dispatches two would-be rapists. While in Kattegat, Ragnar convinces Rollo that raids to the West are worthwhile and possible, thanks to new navigational tools, but is rebuked by his ruler, Earl Haraldson, who continues to order raids into the Baltic. Bjorn and Ragnar visit Floki, Ragnar's friend and a gifted shipwright, who has been secretly building a new type of longship, which they successfully test. Meanwhile, back at home, Rollo makes unwelcome advances on Lagertha. Ragnar has yet another vision of Odin, standing on the shoreline. This finally convinces Ragnar to move on with his plan.
2	2	"Wrath of the Northmen"	Johan Renck	Michael Hirst	March 10, 2013
After gathering volunteers, Ragnar, Rollo, and Floki embark on an unauthorised raid to the west. Lagertha violently objects to Ragnar's refusal to take her along. Earl Haraldson has the blacksmith who forged Ragnar's anchor killed. At sea the crew are caught in a storm, which a manic Floki interprets as Thor proving his ship unsinkable. On land, monks see the ominous sign of a cloud shaped like a dragon. After a tense voyage, Ragnar's men land on the coast of England, near the monastery of Lindisfarne, which they proceed to sack. They kill most of the monks and capture the rest to take back as slaves, including the young Athelstan, whom Ragnar protects from death at Rollo's hands.
3	3	"Dispossessed"	Johan Renck	Michael Hirst	March 17, 2013
Ragnar's warband returns in triumph to Kattegat, where the Earl immediately confiscates the plundered riches except for one piece per man. Ragnar picks the distraught Athelstan and returns home. The monk's faith and his vow of chastity perplex Ragnar, but he, nonetheless, gathers useful intelligence about the kingdom of Northumbria. Based on this new insight, Earl Haraldson authorises another raid on England. Now accompanied by Lagertha and the Earl's brother, Knut, Ragnar re-embarks post-haste, leaving Athelstan to mind the farm and the children. As the Vikings set foot on English soil, they are met by the local sheriff and a handful of armsmen, who invite the newly landed "traders" to meet King Aelle. Ragnar agrees, but his other warriors' distrust provokes a battle in which the Northumbrians are slaughtered.
4	4	"Trial"	Ciarán Donnelly	Michael Hirst	March 24, 2013
The Vikings raid the Northumbrian village of Hexham with little bloodshed, as the villagers are gathered for Mass. During the raid, Lagertha kills Knut when he tries to rape a Saxon villager, and then her. Back on the beach, the raiders defeat a superior Northumbrian force under Lord Wigea, sent by King Aelle, and return to Kattegat. There, Earl Haraldson has Ragnar, who claims to have killed Knut, arrested and tried at the Thing assembly. The Earl's ploy to bribe Rollo to testify against Ragnar fails, and Ragnar is acquitted. As the raiders celebrate with Athelstan and Ragnar's children, they are assaulted by armed men. Although Ragnar's followers prevail, his companion Erik is killed.
5	5	"Raid"	Ciarán Donnelly	Michael Hirst	March 31, 2013
When Earl Haraldson's raiders assault Ragnar's settlement, Ragnar, Lagertha, Athelstan, and the children narrowly escape in a boat. Ragnar is severely wounded, and Athelstan saves him from drowning. The family hides in Floki's house, where the shipwright and his lover Helga slowly nurse Ragnar back to health. Meanwhile, Earl Haraldson marries off his daughter, Thyri, to an elderly earl from Svealand, against his wife, Siggy's, wishes. Aware that the Earl is watching Ragnar's friends, Rollo offers his services to Haraldson. Haraldson has Rollo seized and tortured in an unsuccessful attempt to discover Ragnar's whereabouts. As Torstein, a friend of Ragnar, brings word of this to the still-weak Ragnar, Ragnar sends Floki to deliver a challenge to the Earl — a single combat with Ragnar.
6	6	"Burial of the Dead"	Ciarán Donnelly	Michael Hirst	April 7, 2013
The Earl accepts Ragnar's challenge, and the two meet in single combat. Ragnar kills Haraldson and Siggy kills Bjarni. After Ragnar becomes the new Earl, he grants his dead foe a chieftain's burial at sea, and Athelstan is revolted to see a slave agree to follow her master in death. During the following winter, Lagertha becomes pregnant and Siggy wants to leave town. But Rollo tries to convince Siggy to stay, asking her to marry him, as he mentions his desire to become an Earl. Athelstan asks Ragnar about Ragnarök. Unknowingly Athelstan has broken a social taboo, but Ragnar informs him by feeding him a drug and having the village seer tell Athelstan. This causes the monk to have horrific visions of the world's end. As spring beckons, three of Ragnar's ships sail up the River Tyne. After throwing the luckless Wigea into a snake pit, King Aelle prepares to meet the raiders in battle.
7	7	"A King's Ransom"	Ken Girotti	Michael Hirst	April 14, 2013
The Vikings set up a fortified camp, assault the Northumbrian besiegers at night, and capture the king's brother, Aethelwulf. In a meeting with the king, Ragnar demands 2,000 pounds of gold and silver as a price for the Vikings' departure. Aelle agrees but demands that one Viking be baptised a Christian, and to Floki's scorn, Rollo agrees. Instead of paying the ransom, Aelle has his men attack Ragnar's camp, but they are bloodily repelled, ending with Rollo finishing off several Saxons single-handedly, in an attempt to prove he's still faithful to his gods. After Ragnar sends Aethelwulf's corpse to Aelle, the king finally pays the ransom but swears vengeance upon Ragnar as he watches the raiders depart. Meanwhile, back in Scandinavia, Lagertha rules in Ragnar's stead, accepts Siggy's offer of service, and suffers a miscarriage.
8	8	"Sacrifice"	Ken Girotti	Michael Hirst	April 21, 2013
As Lagertha is unable to conceive another son, Ragnar takes his family and followers to the temple at Uppsala to attend a great rite to the Æsir and Vanir. He pledges fealty to King Horik, who charges Ragnar with an embassy to Jarl Borg, a rival encroaching on Horik's lands. Siggy chides Rollo for not paying attention to his own advancement and sleeping with other women. Priests question Athelstan, now in norse garb, about his faith. Athelstan denies Christ three times. They discern that despite his claims, he has not renounced Christianity, and they declare him unfit to be sacrificed to the gods. Leif, Ragnar's follower, volunteers in Athelstan's place for this single honour and is sacrificed by King Horik at the climax of the rite together with eight other men and numerous animals.
9	9	"All Change"	Ken Girotti	Michael Hirst	April 28, 2013
Ragnar's embassy to Jarl Borg in Götaland fails, as King Horik rejects a compromise settlement about the contested land. Driven by ambition and jealousy, Rollo agrees to support Borg against Ragnar. In Kattegat, a disease kills many inhabitants, including Lagertha's daughter, Gyda, and Siggy's daughter, Thyri. Lagertha asks the seer about Ragnar and her future but the seer refuses as he only sees misery. Underway, Ragnar meets and is seduced by the princess Aslaug; eventually, she reveals she carries his child.

== Production ==
=== Development ===
An Irish-Canadian co-production presented by Metro-Goldwyn-Mayer, Vikings was developed and produced by Octagon Films and Take 5 Productions. Morgan O'Sullivan, Sheila Hockin, Sherry Marsh, Alan Gasmer, James Flynn, John Weber, and Michael Hirst are credited as executive producers. This season was produced by Steve Wakefield and Keith Thompson. Bill Goddard and Séamus McInerney are co-producers.

The production team for this season includes casting directors Frank and Nuala Moiselle, costume designer Joan Bergin, visual effects supervisors Julian Parry and Dominic Remane, stunt action designers Franklin Henson and Richard Ryan, composer Trevor Morris, production designer Tom Conroy, editors Aaron Marshall for the first, third, fifth, seventh and ninth episodes, and Michele Conroy for the second, fourth, sixth and eighth episodes, and cinematographer John Bartley. PJ Dillon served as second unit director of photography.

=== Music ===
The Vikings (Original Television Series Soundtrack)

Soundtrack album by Trevor Morris
- Released: June 21, 2013
- Genre: Soundtrack
- Length: 76:49
- Label: Sony Music Entertainment

The musical score for the first season was composed by Trevor Morris in collaboration with Steven Richard Davis, Steve Tavaglione, Brian Kilgore, Tina Guo and Mel Wesson. The opening sequence is accompanied by the song "If I Had a Heart" by Fever Ray.

The soundtrack album was released on June 21, 2013, by Sony Music Entertainment.

Additional non-original music by Norwegian music group Wardruna is featured in the episodes "Trial" and "Sacrifice". The featured tracks—which were not included in the soundtrack release—are "Fehu", "Ár var alda", "Heimta Thurs", "Dagr", "Laukr", and "Løyndomsriss".

Track listing
No.	Title	Artist(s)	Length
1.	"If I Had a Heart"	Fever Ray	3:47
2.	"Battle Field"	Steven Richard Davis; Steve Tavaglione; Brian Kilgore; Tina Guo; Mel Wesson	1:58
3.	"The Eye of Odin"	Davis; Tavaglione; Kilgore; Guo; Wesson	0:59
4.	"Of Fathers and Sons"	Davis; Tavaglione; Kilgore; Guo; Wesson	0:43
5.	"Journey to Kattegat"	Davis; Tavaglione; Kilgore; Guo; Wesson	1:30
6.	"Northern Lights / Entry to Kattegat"	Davis; Tavaglione; Kilgore; Guo; Wesson	2:09
7.	"The Sunstone"	Davis; Tavaglione; Kilgore; Guo; Wesson	1:57
8.	"You Shall Not Enter Valhalla"	Davis; Tavaglione; Kilgore; Guo; Wesson	1:26
9.	"Meeting Floki"	Davis; Tavaglione; Kilgore; Guo; Wesson	2:20
10.	"Ragnar's Sail"	Davis; Tavaglione; Kilgore; Guo; Wesson	1:26
11.	"Ragnar Recruits"	Davis; Tavaglione; Kilgore; Guo; Wesson	1:50
12.	"Seduction"	Davis; Tavaglione; Kilgore; Guo; Wesson	1:49
13.	"Vikings Set Sail"	Davis; Tavaglione; Kilgore; Guo; Wesson	1:02
14.	"North Sea Storm"	Davis; Tavaglione; Kilgore; Guo; Wesson	1:16
15.	"Madness Takes Hold"	Davis; Tavaglione; Kilgore; Guo; Wesson	1:51
16.	"Vikings Reach Land"	Davis; Tavaglione; Kilgore; Guo; Wesson	1:42
17.	"Vikings Attack Village"	Davis; Tavaglione; Kilgore; Guo; Wesson	1:34
18.	"Floki's Fire"	Davis; Tavaglione; Kilgore; Guo; Wesson	1:21
19.	"Vikings Sail Home"	Davis; Tavaglione; Kilgore; Guo; Wesson	1:35
20.	"Vikings in Hexham"	Davis; Tavaglione; Kilgore; Guo; Wesson	2:42
21.	"Mano e Mano"	Davis; Tavaglione; Kilgore; Guo; Wesson	1:22
22.	"Battle on the Beach"	Davis; Tavaglione; Kilgore; Guo; Wesson	3:30
23.	"Athelstan Asks for Freedom"	Davis; Tavaglione; Kilgore; Guo; Wesson	1:57
24.	"Ragnar Challenges the Earl"	Davis; Tavaglione; Kilgore; Guo; Wesson	1:32
25.	"Making a Deal"	Davis; Tavaglione; Kilgore; Guo; Wesson	1:02
26.	"Earl Accepts the Challenge"	Davis; Tavaglione; Kilgore; Guo; Wesson	2:49
27.	"Ragnar Fights the Earl"	Davis; Tavaglione; Kilgore; Guo; Wesson	3:17
28.	"Sending the Earl to Valhalla"	Davis; Tavaglione; Kilgore; Guo; Wesson	1:48
29.	"Ragnar Takes the Throne"	Davis; Tavaglione; Kilgore; Guo; Wesson	1:15
30.	"The Angel of Death"	Davis; Tavaglione; Kilgore; Guo; Wesson	2:01
31.	"Lagertha Oversees Dispute"	Davis; Tavaglione; Kilgore; Guo; Wesson	1:40
32.	"Vikings Attack"	Davis; Tavaglione; Kilgore; Guo; Wesson	2:31
33.	"Rollo is Baptised"	Davis; Tavaglione; Kilgore; Guo; Wesson	2:12
34.	"Rollo Left Behind"	Davis; Tavaglione; Kilgore; Guo; Wesson	2:41
35.	"Ragnar Meets the Naked Woman"	Davis; Tavaglione; Kilgore; Guo; Wesson	2:21
36.	"The Ash Tree"	Davis; Tavaglione; Kilgore; Guo; Wesson	1:11
37.	"Aslaug Is with Child"	Davis; Tavaglione; Kilgore; Guo; Wesson	1:46
38.	"An Uncertain World"	Davis; Tavaglione; Kilgore; Guo; Wesson	6:57
Total length:			76:49

== Reception ==
The first season of Vikings received positive reviews. The review aggregator website Rotten Tomatoes reported an 81% approval rating with an average rating of 6.9/10 based on 27 reviews. The site's consensus reads, "Vikings makes up for its lack of historical accuracy with a heaping helping of violence, romance, and striking visuals". Metacritic assigned a score of 71 based on 20 reviews.

IGN gave the season an overall score of 7/10, stating: "While parts of the story felt rushed and sparsely told, Vikings still gave us a good first season outing."
