= Vikings season 2 =

Season of television series

Vikings
- Season 2
- DVD cover art
- Starring: Travis Fimmel; Katheryn Winnick; Clive Standen; Jessalyn Gilsig; Gustaf Skarsgård; George Blagden; Alyssa Sutherland; Donal Logue; Linus Roache; Alexander Ludwig
- No. of episodes: 10

Release
- Original network: History
- Original release: February 27 – May 1, 2014

Season chronology
- ← Previous; Season 1 Next → Season 3

The second season of the historical drama television series Vikings premiered on February 27, 2014, on History in Canada, and concluded on May 1, 2014, consisting of ten episodes. The series broadly follows the exploits of the legendary Viking chieftain Ragnar Lothbrok and his crew, and later those of his sons. The first season of the series begins at the start of the Viking Age, marked by the Lindisfarne raid in 793.

The second season follows Ragnar's struggles with rival Vikings and his rise from Earl to King. The Vikings raid farther into England, and for the first time are offered land for settlement.

== Cast ==
=== Main ===
- Travis Fimmel as Earl Ragnar Lothbrok of Kattegat, who is interested in discovering the lands and customs of England
- Katheryn Winnick as Lagertha, a shield-maiden and Ragnar's first wife; after leaving Ragnar she marries Sigvard and later becomes Earl Ingstad of Hedeby.
- Clive Standen as Rollo, a warrior and Ragnar's brother.
- Jessalyn Gilsig as Siggy, Earl Haraldson's late wife, and Rollo's lover
- Gustaf Skarsgård as Floki, a gifted shipbuilder, and friend of Ragnar
- George Blagden as Athelstan, a monk from Northumbria torn between Viking and Christian beliefs, and adviser to both Earl Ragnar and King Ecbert.
- Alyssa Sutherland as Princess Aslaug, Brynhildr's daughter and Ragnar's second wife.
- Donal Logue as King Horik of Denmark, interested in joining Ragnar's raid to England
- Linus Roache as King Ecbert of Wessex, the cunning king of Wessex
- Alexander Ludwig as Bjorn Ironside, son of Ragnar and Lagertha, in love with the slave Þórunn
  - Nathan O'Toole portrays a young Bjorn Ironside in "Brother's War".

=== Recurring ===
- Thorbjørn Harr as Jarl Borg of Götaland
- Jefferson Hall as Torstein, one of Ragnar's warriors
- Maude Hirst as Helga, Floki's partner
- Morgan C. Jones as The Law Giver, the lawspeaker of Kattegat
- Carrie Crowley as Elisef, wife of Erik
- John Kavanagh as The Seer, a seiðmann
- Cormac Melia as Ubbe, eldest son of Ragnar and Aslaug
- Cathal O'Hallin as Hvitserk, second son of Ragnar and Aslaug
- Edvin Endre as Erlendur, son of King Horik
- Morten Sasse Suurballe as Jarl Sigvard, Lagertha's second husband
- Moe Dunford as Prince Aethelwulf of Wessex, son of King Ecbert
- Duncan Lacroix as Ealdorman Werferth, serving King Ecbert
- Philip O'Sullivan as Bishop Edmund
- Georgia Hirst as Torvi, wife of Jarl Borg
- Richard Ashton as Thorvard, a Viking warrior loyal to King Horik
- Gaia Weiss as Þórunn (/θorunn/), a slave and love of Björn
- Steve Wall as Einar, a relative of Jarl Sigvard
- Ivan Kaye as King Aelle of Northumbria
- Sarah Greene as Princess Judith of Northumbria, daughter of King Aelle, wife to Aethelwulf
- Amy Bailey as Princess Kwenthrith of Mercia

=== Guests ===
- Tadhg Murphy as Arne, one of Ragnar's warriors
- Anna Åström as Hild, a servant in Kattegat
- Jay Duffy as Ari, King Horik's second son
- Alan Devine as Ealdorman Eadric, serving King Ecbert
- Edmund Kente as Bishop Swithern of Winchester
- Jens Christian Buskov Lund as Olrik
- Cathy White as Queen Ealhswith of Northumbria, King Aelle's wife
- Elizabeth Moynihan as Queen Gunnhild of Denmark, King Horik's wife
- Carl Shaaban as Jesus, appearing in visions

== Episodes ==
No. overall	No. in season	Title	Directed by	Written by	Original release date
10	1	"Brother's War"	Ciarán Donnelly	Michael Hirst	February 27, 2014
Rollo battles Ragnar when Jarl Borg and King Horik's men clash. Rollo surrenders to Ragnar after admitting he cannot kill him. Ragnar negotiates an unsteady truce between Borg and Horik, then returns to Kattegat. Ragnar's attempts to reconnect with his wife are hampered when Lagertha learns about his affair with Aslaug. Ragnar finally mourns for his dead daughter, Gyda. Ragnar's life becomes more complicated when a ship arrives bearing a visibly pregnant Aslaug. Rollo is placed on trial, but is shocked when freed by the lawkeeper, who has been bribed by Ragnar. Despite Lagertha's enmity towards Aslaug, Ragnar decides to take the princess as his second wife. Humiliated, Lagertha leaves Ragnar and Kattegat. Ragnar tries to stop her and pleads with her to return, but she rebuffs him. Ragnar's sorrow is multiplied when Bjorn rejects him and goes away with his mother.
11	2	"Invasion"	Ciarán Donnelly	Michael Hirst	March 6, 2014
Four years later, Ragnar is married to Aslaug and has two sons, with a third child on the way. Ragnar finally announces plans to raid England. Horik and Borg arrive, but Horik persuades Ragnar to break the pact with Borg. Ragnar accepts Rollo back into his family, but forbids him from raiding. Aslaug thinks that Ragnar treats her as an idiot and prophesies to him that their next son would be born with a serpent in his eye. The Seer tells Ragnar that his sons will be more famous than him. Ragnar and Horik's men set sail for England, but a violent storm throws them off course. While exploring, they are ambushed by soldiers and several men are killed including one of Horik's sons. Athelstan saves Ragnar's life during the fight. They learn that they are in Wessex, which is ruled by King Ecbert, a man described as similar to Ragnar.
12	3	"Treachery"	Ken Girotti	Michael Hirst	March 13, 2014
Ragnar and his men move deeper into Wessex. He believes the land's greatest wealth is its rich soil, which could support a Viking colony. Ecbert sends envoys to ask Ragnar to leave; Ragnar replies asking what Ecbert would be willing to pay. In Hedeby, Lagertha is now remarried to an abusive husband, Earl Sigvard, and both she and Bjorn are unhappy. Meanwhile, Aslaug gives birth to a son with a serpent in his eye, thereby proving that she is a Völva. Bjorn wants to go out into the world and prove his manhood, but his stepfather won't allow it. Meanwhile, Jarl Borg remarries and decides to seize Ragnar's lands in retaliation for Ragnar breaking their truce. With all the able warriors gone, Rollo rallies the village's women, children and elderly, but Borg massacres them and seizes control of Kattegat. Rollo is forced to flee with Aslaug, her sons and Siggy.
13	4	"Eye for an Eye"	Ken Girotti	Michael Hirst	March 20, 2014
Ragnar meets King Ecbert, who questions his reasons for staying in Wessex and offers to grant him some land. Later, back at camp, one of Horik's ships arrives with news of Jarl Borg's sacking of Kattegat. Ragnar and his men set sail for home. Athelstan chooses to remain with Horik, but is later captured by soldiers after his hunting party is ambushed. Rollo hides Aslaug, Siggy and the other survivors at a remote homestead and tries to rally others to help them retake Kattegat. Ragnar returns home and finds his family. His happiness is soured by Rollo's revelation that they do not have enough men to defeat Borg. Ragnar wants to have sex with Aslaug, but she prophesies that they need to wait for three days before having sex. In Wessex, Athelstan is branded an apostate and is crucified, but his life is saved when Ecbert arrives and orders him taken down from the cross. Ragnar is surprised when a large group of fighters arrives led by Lagertha and Bjorn. Ragnar is overjoyed to be reunited with Bjorn.
14	5	"Answers in Blood"	Jeff Woolnough	Michael Hirst	March 27, 2014
Concerned that Borg is heavily entrenched, Ragnar plans to lure him away from Kattegat. Ragnar and Bjorn sneak into the town at night and set fire to the winter food stores, forcing Borg to give chase. Ragnar engages Borg's forces in a bloody battle, and Borg's host is routed and forced to flee. Ragnar reenters Kattegat, and Bjorn is asked to sacrifice a prisoner to the gods. Aslaug tells Ragnar she is pregnant again but is afraid how the prophecy will impact their child. Ragnar visits the Seer and confesses that he wants both Lagertha and Aslaug as his wives. In Wessex, Athelstan is kept at Ecbert's court, giving the king insight into pagan beliefs. Athelstan struggles with his former Christian beliefs. Lagertha gives Bjorn permission to remain in Kattegat with Ragnar, but chooses to return to her husband. A messenger arrives and informs Ragnar that Ecbert's forces have slaughtered Horik's men, with Horik and his son, Erlendur, barely escaping.
15	6	"Unforgiven"	Jeff Woolnough	Michael Hirst	April 3, 2014
King Horik returns to Kattegat, defeated by King Ecbert and with few of his forces surviving. Hungry for revenge, Horik tells Ragnar that they need the help of Jarl Borg again, since he has many ships. Aslaug is not pleased and asks Ragnar not to listen to Horik. Rollo is sent as emissary to Götaland to negotiate with Jarl Borg, the latter accepts the offer after consulting with the skull of his first wife. Athelstan becomes a confidant of King Ecbert, entrusted to look after secret Roman scrolls and relics. Bjorn finds himself interested by a slave called Þórunn. Lagertha returns home to a displeased Sigvard who sends men to beat her during the night. He tries to humiliate her further the next day, but she plunges a knife into his eye and his nephew Einar beheads him. Jarl Borg returns to Kattegat to join forces with Ragnar, but during the night his men are burned alive and he is taken captive.
16	7	"Blood Eagle"	Kari Skogland	Michael Hirst	April 10, 2014
Horik and Ragnar agree that they need more ships and warriors to return to England. Horik persuades Ragnar to delay killing Jarl Borg, in case his execution scares off potential allies. Helga reveals that she is carrying Floki's child and they agree to wed. When Helga seeks Ragnar's blessing, Floki claims they do not need it. They instead marry with King Horik's blessing. Ragnar visits the Seer who reveals that Athelstan is alive but spiritually torn. In England, King Ecbert proposes an alliance with King Ælla against the expected return of the Vikings. To win over a suspicious Ælla, Ecbert marries his son to Ælla's daughter to seal their alliance. Ragnar's call for an ally is answered by a mysterious Earl, who is revealed to be Lagertha. Aslaug tells Ragnar she is pleased that Lagertha is joining forces with him. Bjorn doesn't manage to make Þorunn take her own romantic decisions, as he is her master. Rollo forces Siggy to admit she is sleeping with Horik. Horik tricks Borg into thinking he will escape his fate, but in the end Borg is led into town to be executed. Ragnar performs the Blood Eagle ceremony on Borg.
17	8	"Boneless"	Kari Skogland	Michael Hirst	April 17, 2014
Aslaug's prophecy comes to pass when she gives birth to a son with malformed legs. Despite Ragnar's insistence that he should have no future in Viking society and must die, Aslaug keeps him. Ragnar names him Ivar the Boneless. Lagertha arrives in Kattegat with her ships and warriors. In Wessex, Ecbert receives Princess Kwenthrith of Mercia, who is in civil war with her family after murdering her brother. Kwenthrith takes a sexual interest in the Northmen and Athelstan. Sensing Floki's growing rift with Ragnar, Horik attempts to entice him to his side. Before boarding, Bjorn kisses Porunn, who then admits her feelings for him. After landing in Wessex, Ragnar decides on his own to send Torstein to inform Ecbert of their arrival, annoying Horik and Lagertha. Aethelwulf and a group of soldiers arrive, and he invites Ragnar to speak with his father. As a sign of goodwill, Aethelwulf returns Athelstan's bracelet to confirm that the monk is still alive. Despite Ragnar's promise of safety, Aethelwulf's group is ambushed by Northmen led by Erlendur. The entire group is slaughtered except for Aethelwulf who is allowed to escape.
18	9	"The Choice"	Ken Girotti	Michael Hirst	April 24, 2014
While reviewing old Roman texts with Athelstan, Ecbert sees a way to defeat the Vikings. Horik advances towards what he thinks is the Wessex army, but Ecbert catches the Vikings between two troops of cavalry and defeats them. Rollo is badly injured, but is recognised by Athelstan and taken back to Winchester. Ragnar names his son Björn Ironside, as he is unscathed. Ælla wants to destroy the remaining Vikings but instead Ecbert decides to offer them land and to employ them as mercenaries to fight against Mercia. Rollo is returned to the Vikings, and some of them volunteer to fight for Kwenthrith. Athelstan returns to Kattegat with the Vikings, admitting to Ragnar that he holds belief in both the Christian and Norse gods now. Meanwhile, Aslaug makes Þorunn a free woman so that she could be with Bjorn.
19	10	"The Lord's Prayer"	Ken Girotti	Michael Hirst	May 1, 2014
Horik's wife and children arrive in Kattegat and the village celebrates. To prove to Horik he is trustworthy, Floki poisons Torstein. Horik reveals his plan to kill Ragnar and his entire family. In return for a promise to marry her, Horik orders Siggy to kill Ragnar's children. Þorunn finally gets into a relationship with Bjorn, as a free woman. Athelstan teaches Ragnar the Lord's Prayer. With reinforcements, Horik attacks Kattegat. Arriving in the main hall, he discovers Torstein alive, and sees that Floki and Siggy did not betray Ragnar. Ragnar kills Horik and takes his sword. He spares Erlendur's life, as it was Horik's last wish. Ragnar is now king, sitting atop the iconic cliff Preikestolen.

== Production ==
=== Development ===
An Irish-Canadian co-production presented by Metro-Goldwyn-Mayer, Vikings was developed and produced by Octagon Films and Take 5 Productions. Morgan O'Sullivan, Sheila Hockin, Sherry Marsh, Alan Gasmer, James Flynn, John Weber, and Michael Hirst are credited as executive producers. This season was produced by Steve Wakefield and Keith Thompson. Bill Goddard and Séamus McInerney are co-producers.

The production team for this season includes casting directors Frank and Nuala Moiselle, costume designer Joan Bergin, visual effects supervisors Julian Parry and Dominic Remane, stunt action designers Franklin Henson and Richard Ryan, composer Trevor Morris, production designers Tom Conroy for the first to sixth episodes, and Mark Geraghty for the seventh to tenth episodes, editors Aaron Marshall for the first, third, fifth, seventh and ninth episodes, and Don Cassidy for the second, fourth, sixth, eighth and tenth episodes, and cinematographer PJ Dillon.

=== Music ===
[The first season of Vikings] was a tough score to ‘crack the code’ for. It never quite clicked the way I wanted it to. In Season Two, I felt I made the music I always wanted to make for Vikings, which was visceral and 90% non-orchestral. I found a soloist, Einar Selvik [of the musical/spiritual collective Wardruna], who lives in Norway. A true Viking who became my secret weapon. I used more ethnic instruments of the Norse area. The blend finally clicked for me.

— Trevor Morris on returning to Vikings for season 2

The Vikings II (Original Television Series Soundtrack)

Soundtrack album by Trevor Morris
- Released: June 13, 2014
- Genre: Soundtrack
- Length: 77:34
- Label: Sony Classical Records

The musical score for the second season was composed by Trevor Morris in collaboration with Einar Selvik, Steve Tavaglione and Brian Kilgore. The opening sequence is again accompanied by the song "If I Had a Heart" by Fever Ray.

The soundtrack album was released on June 13, 2014, by Sony Classical Records.

Additional non-original music by Norwegian music group Wardruna is featured in the episodes "Eye For an Eye", "Blood Eagle", "Boneless" and "The Lord's Prayer". The featured tracks—which were not included in the soundtrack release—are "EhwaR", "Algir — Tognatale", "Dagr", "Bjarkan", "Løyndomsriss", "Heimta Thurs", "IngwaR", "Solringen", "Helvegen", "Sowelu" and "Gibu".

Track listing
No.	Title	Artist(s)	Length
1.	"War Is Coming"	Trevor Morris; Einar Selvik; Steve Tavaglione; Brian Kilgore	3:21
2.	"Battle of Brothers"	Morris; Selvik; Tavaglione; Kilgore	6:20
3.	"Bjorn's Choice"	Morris; Selvik; Tavaglione; Kilgore	1:58
4.	"Vikings Return Home"	Morris; Selvik; Tavaglione; Kilgore	1:00
5.	"Rollo's Trial"	Morris; Selvik; Tavaglione; Kilgore	3:32
6.	"Ragnar Says Goodbye to Gyda"	Morris; Selvik; Tavaglione; Kilgore	2:29
7.	"Rollo Tries to Regain Ragnar's Trust"	Morris; Selvik; Tavaglione; Kilgore	1:49
8.	"Vikings Attacked"	Morris; Selvik; Tavaglione; Kilgore	3:57
9.	"Jarl Borg Attacks Kattegat"	Morris; Selvik; Tavaglione; Kilgore	3:05
10.	"Ragnar Reunites with Family"	Morris; Selvik; Tavaglione; Kilgore	1:30
11.	"Ragnar, Bjorn Sneak Into Kattegat"	Morris; Selvik; Tavaglione; Kilgore	5:15
12.	"Battle for Kattegat"	Morris; Selvik; Tavaglione; Kilgore	6:08
13.	"Jarl Borg and Ragnar Make Peace"	Morris; Selvik; Tavaglione; Kilgore	1:38
14.	"Aslaug In Pain"	Morris; Selvik; Tavaglione; Kilgore	1:42
15.	"Ragnar Describes the Blood Eagle"	Morris; Selvik; Tavaglione; Kilgore	1:21
16.	"Ragnar Meets Ingstad"	Morris; Selvik; Tavaglione; Kilgore	2:09
17.	"Aslaug Gives Birth"	Morris; Selvik; Tavaglione; Kilgore	2:14
18.	"Aethelwulf Is Ambushed"	Morris; Selvik; Tavaglione; Kilgore	1:42
19.	"Athelstan Translates Scrolls"	Morris; Selvik; Tavaglione; Kilgore	2:06
20.	"Vikings Retreat"	Morris; Selvik; Tavaglione; Kilgore	6:31
21.	"Vikings Mourn Their Dead"	Morris; Selvik; Tavaglione; Kilgore	0:51
22.	"Porunn's Metaphorical Swim"	Morris; Selvik; Tavaglione; Kilgore	1:22
23.	"Horik Propositions Floki"	Morris; Selvik; Tavaglione; Kilgore	1:18
24.	"Horik Asks Floki to Kill"	Morris; Selvik; Tavaglione; Kilgore	1:09
25.	"Horik Watches Game"	Morris; Selvik; Tavaglione; Kilgore	1:35
26.	"Feeding Rollo Poison Mushrooms"	Morris; Selvik; Tavaglione; Kilgore	1:41
27.	"Erlendur Shown Sword of Kings"	Morris; Selvik; Tavaglione; Kilgore	1:21
28.	"Horik's Forces Attack"	Morris; Selvik; Tavaglione; Kilgore	3:36
29.	"Killing Horik — King Ragnar"	Morris; Selvik; Tavaglione; Kilgore	4:54
Total length:			77:34

== Reception ==
The second season of Vikings received positive reviews. On review aggregator website Rotten Tomatoes, the second season has a 92% approval rating with an average rating of 8.2/10 based on 13 reviews. The site's consensus reads, "Vikings makes up for its slow pace with captivating characters and visual appeal". Metacritic which uses a weighted average, assigned a score of 77 out of 100 based on 11 reviews, indicating "generally favorable reviews".
