= IDK About You =

Single by Fever Ray

from the album Plunge
- Released: 1 March 2018
- Genre: Footwork
- Length: 3:40
- Label: Rabid
- Songwriter(s): Karin Dreijer
- Producer(s): Nídia; Karin Dreijer; Johannes Berglund (add.)

Fever Ray singles chronology
"Wanna Sip" (2018)	"IDK About You" (2018)	"What They Call Us" (2022)

Music video
- "IDK About You" on YouTube

"IDK About You" is a song by Fever Ray, an alias of Swedish musician Karin Dreijer. It was released on 1 March 2018 through Rabid Records as the third single from their second studio album, Plunge (2017), following the singles "To the Moon and Back" and "Wanna Sip".

== Composition ==
"IDK About You" is a footwork song constructed around a fast drum pattern of 160 beats per minute and a female gasp utilized as percussion. It was written by Dreijer who also produced the song with Portuguese producer Nídia, with additional production work from Johannes Berglund. The song was said to express "the extremes of curiosity, eagerness and reticence you might experience with online dating."

== Critical reception ==
Upon the release of Plunge, "IDK About You" was named Best New Track by Pitchfork, with critic Mark Pytlik describing the song as "next-level goth techno insanity," further stating: "The end result is pure adrenaline, making this the frantic and booming centerpiece of an already twitchy album."

== Music video ==
The music video for "IDK About You" was uploaded to Fever Ray's YouTube channel on 16 February 2018. It was directed by Martin Falck, who directed all the visuals from Plunge. The video continues the narrative Dreijer began with previous videos titled "Switch Seeks Friend" and "A New Friend" and later the music videos for "To the Moon and Back" and "Wanna Sip". In the video, a large group of costumes descend upon Fever Ray's character in a dirty and colored room filled with posters of Justin Bieber, glowing orbs, scrawled messages and a vaginal doorway rimmed with teeth. In a press release, Dreijer stated that the video also serves as an introduction for their touring band, which consists of Liliana Zavala, Mikaela Hansson, Maryam Nikandish, Diva Cruz, and Helena Gutarra.

== Track listing ==
Digital download

1. "IDK About You" – 3:40
2. "IDK About You" (feat. rip ME) [rip ME reWORK] – 5:08

Bunny Michael Remix

1. "IDK About You" (Bunny Michael Remix) – 2:58

== Personnel ==
- Fever Ray – vocals, production
- Nídia – production
- Johannes Berglund – additional production, mixing
- Mandy Parnell – mastering
