= Tami T =

- Born: 1987 (age 38–39); Gothenburg, Sweden
- Genres: Electronic; dance-pop; avant-pop
- Occupations: Singer; songwriter; record producer; DJ
- Years active: 2005–present

Tami T (born 1987), formerly known as Tami Tamaki, is a Swedish singer songwriter, record producer, and DJ whose work spans electronic, dance-pop, and avant-pop.

== Life ==
Tami T was born in Gothenburg, Sweden, and was part of punk bands as a teenager. She began producing her own music at the age of 18, and upon moving to Leipzig, Germany in 2013 she started making "glitter electronica" under the name Tami Tamaki. Her breakthrough came when the song I Never Loved This Hard This Fast Before was featured in Ester Martin Bergsmark's 2014 film Something Must Break. Her music also appeared on the Norwegian TV series Skam.

She began using the artist name Tami T in March 2016, and she is now based in Berlin. Her debut album High Pitched and Moist was released in 2019 on the label Trannytone Records. When asked about the heavily processed vocals on the album in an interview for the zine FEM, she explained that "by pitching [their voice] up an octave and auto-tuning it, it became a voice I could identify with and an instrument I wanted to work with". In 2017, she co-produced the song "A Part of Us" on Fever Ray's album Plunge and toured with them.

She aims to blur and redefine the lines of gender and gender identity with her music and art.
