= Plunge (Fever Ray album) =

Studio album by Fever Ray
- Released: 27 October 2017
- Genres: Electropop; experimental
- Length: 46:56
- Labels: Rabid; Mute
- Producers: Karin Dreijer; Johannes Berglund; Peder Mannerfelt; Paula Temple; Tami T; Nídia; Deena Abdelwahed

Fever Ray chronology
Fever Ray (2009)	Plunge (2017)	Radical Romantics (2023)

Singles from Plunge
- 1. "To the Moon and Back" Released: 20 October 2017; 2. "Wanna Sip" Released: 23 January 2018; 3. "IDK About You" Released: 1 March 2018

Plunge is the second studio album by Fever Ray, an alias of Swedish musician Karin Dreijer. It was released on 27 October 2017 through Rabid Records. It is their first album in nearly eight years, following their 2009 eponymous debut. The album was largely recorded in Dreijer's Stockholm studio in collaboration with producers Paula Temple, Deena Abdelwahed, Nídia, Tami T, Peder Mannerfelt, and Johannes Berglund.

The album was preceded by the lead single "To the Moon and Back", which was released a week before the album. It was later supported by two more singles, "Wanna Sip" and "IDK About You". The album received acclaim from music critics, who praised its directly political and sexual themes alongside deconstructed club beats and catchy electronic hooks.

== Release and promotion ==
Plunge was surprise released on 27 October 2017 with no prior announcement. It was released a week after the release of the lead single, "To the Moon and Back". Prior to the release of the single on 20 October, Dreijer shared two teaser videos titled "Switch Seeks Same" and "A New Friend" on 16 and 18 October, respectively. Both teasers included the word "Plunge", leading to speculations of a new album. The first teaser samples the songs "Red Trails" and "An Itch", while the second teaser samples "This Country". The album was released physically on vinyl and CD on 23 February 2018.

On 23 January 2018, Dreijer released a music video for the second single "Wanna Sip". On 16 February, they released a music video for "IDK About You", which was released as the third single on 1 March.

In February and March 2018, Dreijer headed on a European tour in support of the album, and embarked on a North American tour in May 2018.

== Composition ==
Plunge contains aggressive beats and synths, and showcases a more varied sound than that of Fever Ray. Release Magazine described the album as "some absolutely cracking experimental electronic pop." Dreijer's voice is notably not hidden behind pitch-shifting as it was on Fever Ray, but instead, is "sharpened and pushed high in the mix, the better to emphasize [their] strange, elastic, playful diction." Pitchfork stated that the album "feels much more manic" and "conflicted" than their debut, while noting that in opposition to the numbness and "penumbral chill" of Fever Ray, Plunge "puts the heat and light back into [their] alias: the fever, the radiance, the beams emanating from red-ringed eyes." Lyrically, the album focuses on themes of love and desire with a striking candor. It features Dreijer's most verbose, dense and direct lyrics, and was said to be "political in a way Dreijer has not been before."

== Critical reception ==
Professional ratings
Aggregate scores
Source	Rating
AnyDecentMusic?	8.3/10
Metacritic	87/100
Review scores
Source	Rating
AllMusic	4.5/5 stars
The A.V. Club	A−
The Irish Times	4/5 stars
Mixmag	8/10
Mojo	4/5 stars
The Observer	4/5 stars
Pitchfork	8.7/10
Record Collector	5/5 stars
Uncut	8/10
Vice (Expert Witness)	A−

Plunge received widespread acclaim from critics. At Metacritic, which assigns a normalized rating out of 100 to reviews from mainstream publications, the album received an average score of 87, based on 21 reviews. Pitchfork writer Philip Sherburne called it a "thrillingly restless album", "riskier than anything [they have] made before. It is sometimes harsh, often dissonant, frequently audacious." Nina Corcoran of Consequence of Sound said Dreijer "pushes [themself] to new limits, and it feels entirely individualistic," continuing: "The instrumentation and Dreijer's primal delivery of the lyrics make Plunge a gripping follow-up that upstages its predecessor. Fever Ray made you self-aware of your mind. Plunge makes you self-aware of your body, what it's capable of, and how good it feels to move in your skin." Adam Turner-Heffer from Drowned in Sound wrote, "Dreijer has cemented [their] place within alternative music's dynasty, and it's refreshing to hear an outwardly queer and fiercely political artist convey a clear message without having the music, performance or reception fall over the potential weight of those themes. For as much as Plunge quite clearly contains these themes, it can and will be enjoyed as a universally creditable piece of brilliantly constructed art, and that is Dreijer's real success here." Writing for Vice, Robert Christgau lauded Dreijer's sex-positive message: "The title instrumental leads directly to 'I want to run my fingers up your pussy' and an open if complicated beyond. Take the plunge, [they're] hinting. It'll be fine. You'll be glad you did."

The A.V. Club's Matt Gerardi praised the album, stating that it lies "in its ability to change on a dime, to provoke—intermittently and from one listen to the next—confusion, shock, laughter, enlightenment, and ultimately admiration." Spin critic Arielle Gordon called it Dreijer's boldest album. In his review for Pretty Much Amazing, Colin Groundwater said, "Plunge is a worthy addition to Dreijer's career discography, and fans of Fever Ray and the Knife are sure to enjoy it. It's an energetic and erotic record that may very well soundtrack some of the freakier parties you attend this fall. Still, it doesn't capture the full scope of Dreijer's ambition." The Skinny gave the album a perfect score, with Katie Hawthorne deeming it as "endlessly innovative", writing: "Plunge befits the return of an iconic creative voice. Dreijer's politics are written on [their] body, and [they're] asking you to dive in. You won't need telling twice." Andrew Ryce of Resident Advisor wrote, "It never feels like Dreijer is playing catch-up. Plunge is the natural next step, a realization of impulses that have long lain dormant, or at least unrecognized." Andy Jex of MusicOMH wrote, "This is a joyous artistic rebirth, its creator shaking [their] tail feathers, pushing [their] own boundaries and immersed in emotion and whim brought out from within." AllMusic gave the album 4 and ½ out of 5 stars, with reviewer Heather Phares concluding that "The journey to dive into commitment that Dreijer takes [their] listeners on with Plunge boasts more moods and colors than Fever Ray's debut, or any single Knife album; ultimately, it's some of [their]. most powerful work with yet."

=== Accolades ===
Publication	Accolade	Rank	Ref.
AllMusic	AllMusic's Best Albums of 2017	—N/a	
The A.V. Club	20 Best Albums of 2017	7	
BrooklynVegan	BrooklynVegan's Top 50 Albums of 2017	21	
Crack Magazine	Top 100 Albums of 2017	3	
Dazed	The 20 Best Albums of 2017	5	
Drowned in Sound	Favourite Albums of 2017	82	
Exclaim!	Top 10 Dance and Electronic Albums of 2017	8	
Fact	The 50 Best Albums of 2017	16	
Highsnobiety	The 25 Best Albums of 2017	15	
MusicOMH	musicOMH's Top 50 Albums of 2017	21	
New York Daily News	The 25 Best Albums of 2017	22	
NME	Albums of the Year 2017	41	
Noisey	The 100 Best Albums of 2017	34	
NPR	The 50 Best Albums of 2017	27	
Pitchfork	The 50 Best Albums of 2017	9	
Pitchfork	The 20 Best Electronic Albums of 2017	1	
PopMatters	The 60 Best Albums of 2017	3	
The Quietus	Albums of the Year 2017	3	
The Skinny	Top 50 Albums of 2017	16	
Slant Magazine	The 25 Best Albums of 2017	12	
Spin	The 50 Best Albums of 2017	17	
Sputnikmusic	Top 50 Albums of 2017	24	
Stereogum	The 50 Best Albums of 2017	12	
Under the Radar	Under the Radar's Top 100 Albums of 2017	32	

== Track listing ==
All tracks are written by Karin Dreijer, except where noted.

No.	Title	Producer(s)	Length
1.	"Wanna Sip" (Dreijer, Peder Mannerfelt)	Mannerfelt; Dreijer	3:28
2.	"Mustn't Hurry"	Paula Temple; Johannes Berglund; Dreijer	4:17
3.	"A Part of Us" (Dreijer, Tami T)	Tami T; Mannerfelt; Dreijer; Berglund^{[a]}	3:30
4.	"Falling"	Mannerfelt; Dreijer	5:03
5.	"IDK About You"	Nídia; Dreijer; Berglund^{[a]}	3:40
6.	"This Country"	Mannerfelt; Dreijer	3:12
7.	"Plunge"	Mannerfelt; Dreijer	5:36
8.	"To the Moon and Back"	Berglund; Mannerfelt; Dreijer	4:37
9.	"Red Trails"	Temple; Berglund	4:50
10.	"An Itch"	Deena Abdelwahed; Mannerfelt; Dreijer	3:45
11.	"Mama's Hand"	Temple; Berglund	4:58
Total length:			46:56

Notes

- ^{^[a]} signifies an additional producer

== Personnel ==
Credits adapted from Mute Records' official website.

=== Musicians ===
- Fever Ray – vocals (tracks 1–6, 8–11)
- Tami T – vocals (track 3)
- Sara Parkman – violin (track 9)
- Aldo Arechar – flutes (track 2)

=== Technical personnel ===
- Fever Ray – production (tracks 1–8, 10)
- Tami T – production (track 3)
- Johannes Berglund – production (tracks 2, 8, 9, 11); additional production (tracks 3, 5); mixing (all tracks)
- Peder Mannerfelt – production (tracks 1, 3, 4, 6–8, 10)
- Paula Temple – production (tracks 2, 9, 11)
- Nídia – production (track 5)
- Deena Abdelwahed – production (track 10)
- Mandy Parnell – mastering

== Charts ==
Chart (2017–18)	Peak position
Austrian Albums (Ö3 Austria)	41
Belgian Albums (Ultratop Flanders)	25
Belgian Albums (Ultratop Wallonia)	153
German Albums (Offizielle Top 100)	55
Scottish Albums (Official Charts)	26
Swiss Albums (Schweizer Hitparade)	33
UK Albums (Official Charts)	77

== Release history ==
Region	Date	Label	Format	Ref.
Various	27 October 2017	Rabid Records	Digital download	
United States	27 October 2017	Mute Records	Digital download	
Canada	27 October 2017	Mute Records	Digital download	
Various	23 February 2018	Rabid Records	CD; LP	
United States	23 February 2018	Mute Records	CD; LP	
Canada	23 February 2018	Mute Records	CD; LP	
