= Mikel Cee Karlsson =

Swedish film director (born 1977)

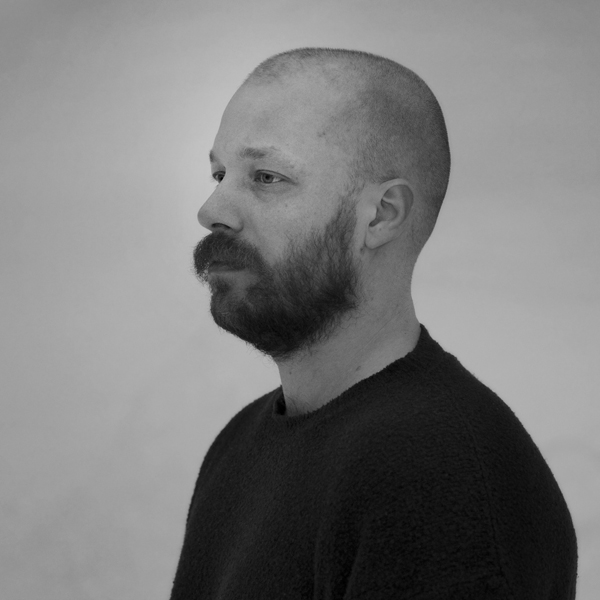
- Mikel Cee Karlsson 2013
- Born: 15 August 1977 (age 47); Varberg, Sweden
- Occupation: Film Director
- Years active: 2000–present

Mikel Cee Karlsson (born 15 August 1977) is a Swedish film director. He has directed three feature-length documentaries as well as numerous music videos for artists like Fever Ray and Junip. Mikel is known for his darkly absurd and often disturbing imagery.

== Biography ==
Mikel Cee Karlsson was born in 1977, in Varberg, Sweden. Mikel graduated from the School of Photography and Film, Gothenburg University in 2005. In addition to his three feature-length documentaries, he has directed numerous music videos for artists like Fever Ray, José González, The Amplifetes, The Perishers and Junip. Since 2007, Mikel is a part of the highly acclaimed Swedish production company Plattform Produktion (Involuntary 2008, Play 2011, Force Majeure 2014, The Square 2017). His award-winning first feature-length documentary Greetings From The Woods had its international premiere in competition in Locarno International Film Festival, 2009. His second documentary The Extraordinary Ordinary Life of José González premiered in competition at the 2010 edition of Göteborg International Film Festival and was also selected for Hot Docs in 2011. Cee Karlsson third feature-length documentary Fraemling premiered in competition at CPH:DOX 2019, nominated in the DOX:Awards category.

== Filmography ==
Year	English Title	Original Title	Type
2000	The Key		Skateboard Film
2002	Fork Boy		Short Film
2004	Grown up	Vuxen	Documentary-Short
2005	The Tough Alliance "Koka-Kola Veins"		Music Video
2006	C.Aarmé "Golden Retriever"		Music Video
2007	Jai Alai Savant "White on white crime"		Music Video
2007	The Perishers "Step out of the shade"		Music Video
2007	José González "Down The Line"		Music Video
2007	José González "Killing For Love"		Music Video
2007	Ida Maria "Oh my god"		Music Video
2008	Bonde do role "Office boy"		Music Video
2008	Madrugada "Look away Lucifer"		Music Video
2009	Greetings from the woods	Hälsningar från skogen	Documentary-Feature
2009	Fever Ray "Triangle Walks"		Music Video
2010	The Extraordinary Ordinary Life of José Gonzalez		Documentary-Feature
2012	The Amplifetes "You/Me/Evolution"		Music Video
2013	Junip "Line of Fire"		Music Video
2013	Junip "Your Life Your Call"		Music Video
2015	José González "Leaf Off / The Cave"		Music Video
2015	Calexico "Falling From The Sky"		Music Video
2015	José González "Open Book"		Music Video
2019	Fraemling		Documentary-Feature
