= Wanna Sip =

Single by Fever Ray

from the album Plunge
- Released: 23 January 2018
- Length: 3:28
- Label: Rabid
- Songwriter(s): Karin Dreijer; Peder Mannerfelt
- Producer(s): Peder Mannerfelt; Karin Dreijer

Fever Ray singles chronology
| "To the Moon and Back" (2017) | "Wanna Sip" (2018) | "IDK About You" (2018) |

Music video
- "Wanna Sip" on YouTube

"Wanna Sip" is a song by Fever Ray, an alias of Swedish musician Karin Dreijer. It was released on 23 January 2018 through Rabid Records as the second single from their second studio album, Plunge (2017), following the lead single "To the Moon and Back".

== Composition ==
"Wanna Sip" is a dark, twisted number with hand claps flickering off a throbbing, uneasy bass beat. It features a use of rattling bells and Shepard tone that resembles the sound of fireworks. The song opens with the lyric "I wanna love you, but you're not making it easy", while an elongated, descending synth note spirals down the scale throughout the chorus. Rob Hakimian of The 405 said the song is "livelier than anything heard from Fever Ray before, and slashed through with dive-bombing synths as she claims that her affection is "a toxic habit."

== Music video ==
"Wanna Sip" was released as a single alongside its accompanying music video. The video was directed in Stockholm by Martin Falck, who directed all of the visuals from Plunge. The video continues the narrative first established in the video titled "Switch Seeks Friend", and then appeared in "A New Friend", the music video for "To The Moon And Back", and "Twosome Takeover", following the same characters and sexually-driven themes and surreal style as the previous clips.

In an interview with Stereogum, Dreijer explained how the video for the song ties into the rest of the clips:

"We started with these two characters. The trailers are sort of the first films that we did. So it starts with one character writing a personal ad and then the second character that we still call just, "The Monster," is answering this ad. They meet up in the first video. There's also this other characters in the video that is at this venue or club or whatever it is that they're eating at. I think the story will continue. You've seen the "Wanna Sip" video, and that is sort of when the Monster and the first character is trying to create some — what do you call it — twosome relationship. Monogamous relationship."

== Track listing ==
Digital download

1. "Wanna Sip" – 3:28
2. "Wanna Sip" (Sissel Wincent Remix) – 6:02
