= Radical Romantics =

Studio album by Fever Ray
- Released: 10 March 2023
- Genres: Electropop; synth-pop
- Length: 44:10
- Labels: Rabid; Mute
- Producers: Karin Dreijer; Olof Dreijer; Vessel; Nídia; Trent Reznor; Atticus Ross; Pär Grindvik; Peder Mannerfelt; Johannes Berglund

Fever Ray chronology
Plunge (2017)	Radical Romantics (2023)

Singles from Radical Romantics
- 1. "What They Call Us" Released: 5 October 2022; 2. "Carbon Dioxide" Released: 10 November 2022; 3. "Kandy" Released: 25 January 2023

Radical Romantics is the third studio album by Fever Ray, an alias of Swedish musician Karin Dreijer. It was released on 10 March 2023 through Rabid and Mute Records. The album features contributions from producers Trent Reznor and Atticus Ross of Nine Inch Nails, and Dreijer's brother, Olof, with whom they formed electronic music duo the Knife. Radical Romantics was preceded by three singles: "What They Call Us", "Carbon Dioxide", and "Kandy".

== Critical reception ==
Professional ratings
Aggregate scores
Source	Rating
AnyDecentMusic?	7.6/10
Metacritic	82/100
Review scores
Source	Rating
AllMusic	4/5 stars
DIY	4/5 stars
The Line of Best Fit	8/10
Mojo	4/5 stars
NME	4/5 stars
The Observer	4/5 stars
Paste	8.1/10
Pitchfork	8.4/10
Slant Magazine	3/5 stars
Uncut	8.7/10

Radical Romantics received critical acclaim from critics. At Metacritic, which assigns a normalized rating out of 100 to reviews from mainstream publications, the album received an average score of 82, based on 17 reviews. Writing for NME, Erica Campbell characterized the album as "a collection of exhilarating pop vignettes examining love as a preoccupation, an unconstrained struggle and most importantly, a myth." The album placed 28th in The Wire's year-end critics' poll.

== Track listing ==
All lyrics written by Karin Dreijer. Vocal production is handled by Johannes Berglund on all tracks.

Radical Romantics track listing
No.	Title	Writer(s)	Producer(s)	Length
1.	"What They Call Us"	Karin Dreijer; Olof Dreijer	K. Dreijer; O. Dreijer	4:27
2.	"Shiver"	K. Dreijer; O. Dreijer	K. Dreijer; O. Dreijer	4:35
3.	"New Utensils"	K. Dreijer; O. Dreijer	K. Dreijer; O. Dreijer	4:17
4.	"Kandy"	K. Dreijer; O. Dreijer	K. Dreijer; O. Dreijer	4:07
5.	"Even It Out"	K. Dreijer	K. Dreijer; Trent Reznor; Atticus Ross; Johannes Berglund^{[a]}	3:07
6.	"Looking for a Ghost"	K. Dreijer; Nídia Borges	K. Dreijer; Nídia; Berglund	3:39
7.	"Carbon Dioxide"	K. Dreijer	K. Dreijer; Vessel	4:51
8.	"North"	K. Dreijer	K. Dreijer; Reznor; Ross	4:04
9.	"Tapping Fingers"	K. Dreijer	K. Dreijer; Pär Grindvik; Peder Mannerfelt	3:57
10.	"Bottom of the Ocean"	K. Dreijer	K. Dreijer	7:06
Total length:				44:10

Notes

- ^{^[a]} indicates an additional producer

== Charts ==
Chart performance for Radical Romantics
Chart (2023)	Peak position
Belgian Albums (Ultratop Flanders)	28
Belgian Albums (Ultratop Wallonia)	117
Scottish Albums (Official Charts)	20
Swiss Albums (Schweizer Hitparade)	92
UK Album Downloads (Official Charts)	12
UK Independent Albums (Official Charts)	7
