= To the Moon and Back (Fever Ray song) =

Single by Fever Ray

from the album Plunge
- Released: 20 October 2017
- Genre: Synth-pop; electropop
- Length: 4:37 (album version); 3:33 (single version)
- Label: Rabid
- Songwriter: Karin Dreijer
- Producers: Peder Mannerfelt; Johannes Berglund; Karin Dreijer

Fever Ray singles chronology
"Mercy Street" (2010)	"To the Moon and Back" (2017)	""Wanna Sip"" (2018)

Music video
- "To the Moon and Back" on YouTube

"To the Moon and Back" is a song by Fever Ray, an alias of Swedish musician Karin Dreijer. It was released on 20 October 2017 through Rabid Records as the lead single from their second studio album, Plunge (2017).

== Release ==
The song was released on 20 October 2017 alongside its accompanying music video. Prior to the release, Dreijer shared two teaser videos titled "Switch Seeks Same" and "A New Friend" on 16 and 18 October, respectively.

== Composition ==
"To the Moon and Back" is a synth-pop and electropop song, with The A.V. Club noting that it is "way lighter than anything on her first album, landing closer to the chirping synth-pop of The Knife's Deep Cuts era than her self-titled debut's dark, frigid sound." Similarly, Pitchfork said the song is "lighter and flirtier than anything we've heard from Fever Ray before," while later comparing it to the electronic musician Jlin. Stereogum called it "a dark but surprisingly accessible synthpop song." The track was written by Dreijer, with production being handled by them in collaboration with Peder Mannerfelt and Johannes Berglund.

== Critical reception ==
El Hunt of DIY wrote, "Turns out every last second of anticipation for new Fever Ray was worthwhile," continuing: "this is an ecstatic return in the fearless ilk of Peaches; liberated, queer, sexy expression at its very best."

== Music video ==
The music video for "To the Moon and Back" was directed by Martin Falck, and features "dark, neon-lit" colors. The video begins with Fever Ray awakening from a cryogenic sleep, while later being picked up by a group of "kinksters" who tie them up and rest a table on their shoulders, leading to a BDSM tea party, which includes a character urinating on them.

In an interview with the Guardian, interviewer Michael Cragg explained that in the video "we witness the old Fever Ray character from the first album being shorn of her blond hair in favour of a bald head (actually a skull cap)," which Dreijer responded to by saying that they love the idea of "shaving your head and starting a new beginning." They later elaborated regarding the video: "There's so much BDSM role play in videos and it's super violent, so I wanted to have a role play that was fun. I said: 'Let's have a tea party and I want to be the table.'"

== Track listing ==
Digital download

1. "To the Moon and Back" (Edit) – 3:33
2. "To the Moon and Back" (Air Horn Edit) – 3:33
