= Martin de Thurah =

Danish film director (born 1974)

- Born: 29 April 1974 (age 52); Copenhagen, Denmark
- Occupations: Director, screenwriter, cinematographer

Martin de Thurah (born 29 April 1974 in Copenhagen) is a Danish film director, screenwriter, cinematographer and music video director.

De Thurah graduated from National Film School of Denmark in 2002.

== Awards ==
- The music video for Carpark North's "Human" won DMA ("Danish Grammy") for Danish Music Video of the Year in 2006. It also won Best Music Video at 2005 RESFEST, Los Angeles and a "Grand Prix" at the Festival International des Art du Clip in Provence.
- He was nominated for Robert Award (2006) in the category Best Special Effects/Lighting for Allegro.
- In 2008, he won the Robert Award for Best Animation for his short film Ung mand falder.
- At the 2008 Chicago International Children's Film Festival, his short film Vi der blev tilbage received the Children's Jury Award for a Live-Action Short Film or Video.
- In 2008, de Thurah's IKEA commercial "Home" won Best Direction at the Creative Circle Awards in Copenhagen and was awarded at the Hugo Television Awards in Chicago.
- At UK Music Video Awards 2009, de Thurah won the Best Director, Best Cinematography and Best Visual Effects awards for his video for Glasvegas’ "Flowers & Football Tops", and Best Pop Video award for Will Young’s "Changes". He was also nominated in several other categories.
- The music video for the single "When I Grow Up" by Fever Ray, as well as videos for two Mew singles, "Introducing Palace Players" and "Repeaterbeater", were nominated at 2010 Bergen International Film Festival in the Scandinavias Best Music Video category.
- At UK Music Video Awards 2012, the music video for Feist's "The Bad In Each Other" won Best Cinematography in A Video.

== Filmography ==
=== Director ===
==== Short films ====
Year	Film	Role
1999	Alice' Alice	Director, writer
2007	Ung mand falder (Young Man Falling)	Director
2008	Vi der blev tilbage (We Who Stayed Behind)	Director, writer
2011	Rainbow Monkeys	Director, writer
2012	Hopper Stories	Director, writer
2012	Mountain	Director

==== Documentaries ====
- På danske læber live (2004) - music documentary

==== Music videos ====
Year	Artist	Song	Notes
2004	Lise Westzynthius	"Séance"	
2004	Epo-555	"Le Beat's on Fire"	
2005	Editors	"Bullets"	
2005	Carpark North	"Human"	
2005	Carpark North	"Best Day"	
2005	Spleen United	"In Peak Fitness Condition"	
2005	Mew	"Special"	
2005	Röyksopp	"What Else Is There?"	
2006	The Futureheads	"Skip to the End"	
2008	Kanye West	"Flashing Lights"	Version 2
2008	Will Young	"Changes	
2009	Glasvegas	"Flowers & Football Tops"	
2009	Fever Ray	"When I Grow Up"	
2009	Mew	"Introducing Palace Players"	
2009	Mew	"Repeaterbeater"	Co-directed by Adam Hashemi and Lasse Martinussen
2010	Mew	"Beach"	Co-directed by Adam Hashemi and Lasse Martinussen
2010	Fallulah	"Give Us A Little Love"	
2010	James Blake	"Limit to Your Love"	
2011	James Blake	"Lindisfarne"	
2012	Feist	"The Bad In Each Other"	
2012	Feist	"Anti-Pioneer"	
2012	David Byrne & St. Vincent	"Who"	
2013	James Blake	"Retrograde"	
2014	Röyksopp & Robyn	"Do It Again"	

=== Other filmography ===
Year	Film	Role
1999	Alice' Alice (short)	Visual effects, storyboard artist
2002	Der er en yndig mand (short)	Graphics
2003	Reconstruction	Production Designer
2003	Mot moi Viet Nam (TV series documentary)	Graphic artist
2003	Himmelnattens kejser - en film om synlighed (documentary)	Visual effects
2004	Boomerang-drengen (TV documentary short)	Visual effects producer, cinematographer
2004	På danske læber live (video documentary)	Camera operator
2004	Min morfars morder (documentary)	Animator
2005	Allegro	Visual effects
2008	Roskilde (documentary)	Co-director
