= Hedda (soundtrack) =

2025 soundtrack album

Hedda (Original Motion Picture Score)

Film score by Hildur Guðnadóttir
- Released: October 22, 2025
- Recorded: 2023–2025
- Genre: Film score
- Length: 26:59
- Label: Milan
- Producer: Hildur Guðnadóttir

Hildur Guðnadóttir chronology
Joker: Folie à Deux (Score from the Original Motion Picture Soundtrack) (2024)	Hedda (Original Motion Picture Score) (2025)	28 Years Later: The Bone Temple (Original Motion Picture Soundtrack) (2026)

Hedda (Music from the Original Motion Picture)

EP by Hildur Guðnadóttir
- Released: October 22, 2025
- Length: 26:59
- Label: Milan

Two soundtrack albums were released for the 2025 drama film Hedda directed by Nia DaCosta, which is based on the play Hedda Gabler by Henrik Ibsen, and stars Tessa Thompson as the titular character. The first album featured the original score composed by Hildur Guðnadóttir and an original song "Stolen Tale" written and composed by DaCosta and performed by Mariam Wallentin, and the second album featured a compilation of old songs performed by Wallentin herself. Both the albums were released through Milan Records on October 22, 2025.

== Development ==
In May 2023, it was announced that Hildur Guðnadóttir would compose the film score for Hedda, in his first collaboration with DaCosta as a composer; she earlier worked as a cellist on Dacosta's directorial Candyman (2021), scored by Robert Aiki Aubrey Lowe. Guðnadóttir said that she chose the script first, as it had a sense of melodic resonance when she imagined the sonic world of the universe and that allowed him to integrate her ideas into it. On working with DaCosta, Guðnadóttir said that she had provided her creative freedom throughout the production allowing her a fluid working process towards crafting the score.

DaCosta's adaptation of the play Hedda Gabler shifts from the 19th century Norway to the 1950s Britain. This setting provided her clear parameters for the sound world: a party with a live jazz band. Hence, Guðnadóttir decided to integrate musical numbers into the film, but not to be a period pastiche and instead driving the narrative forward. Percussions have been considered as the perfect instrumentation for enabling that feel.

Inspired by the period and location, he pitched DaCosta on a building a score around the ideas of Cornelius Cardew, who pioneered the Scratch Orchestra ensemble featuring trained and untrained musicians. Through this method, Gudnadóttir recreated the same approach while recording the score on set with not only the actors but also forming a group with the technicians and crew members making them sing. She deciphered it as a spirit of celebrating the huge amount of crew members who were involved in making the film. The experimental duo Robin Schulkowsky and Joey Baron also worked on producing live jazz and percussions, thus giving the score an extra layer.

Guðnadóttir co-wrote an original song with DaCosta, which she described it as an exciting part. Titled "Stolen Tale" which was performed by Mariam Wallentin, she described the song as a love theme for the film. Besides the use of source music, Guðnadóttir composed a dissonant two-note cue which blends into the band performing a cover of Sidney Keith Russell and Carl Sigman's "Crazy He Calls Me" and a jazzy cover of "It's Oh So Quiet", which lands on the original love theme providing a seamless transition.

== Critical reception ==
Writing for RogerEbert.com, Marya E. Gates found Guðnadóttir's score to be overwhelming, being used as a crutch to dictate how the audience should feel in every emotional moment. Kate Erbland of IndieWire wrote "Hildur Guðnadóttir's unpredictable score fuels the party atmosphere with a tinge of dread". Peter Debruge of Variety noted that Guðnadóttir's "anxiety-inducing score" assisted the film in which "sharp drums and human gasps compound the claustrophobia." Natalia Winkelman of The New York Times wrote "Hildur Gudnadottir's spectral score layers percussion with moaning that could be the sounds of orgasm or agony."

Aisha Harris of NPR wrote that the "sonic exhalations echo throughout composer Hildur Guðnadóttir's evocative score." Tim Grierson of Screen International wrote "Hildur Gudnadottir's jazzy, percussive score amplifying the classy setting". Amon Warmann of Empire wrote "while the clever incorporation of breathless chants at key moments in the film is a touch overused, Hildur Guðnadóttir's score is a percussive delight." Amy Nicholson of Los Angeles Times called it a "tumultuous, percussive score."

== Track listing ==
All tracks are written by Hildur Guðnadóttir, except where noted.

No.	Title	Writer(s)	Performer	Length
1.	"Stolen Tale – Prepping the Party"			2:18
2.	"Stolen Tale"	Nia DaCosta	Mariam Wallentin	3:16
3.	"Allegretto – Glass"			2:30
4.	"The Moment"			2:45
5.	"Allegro – Drums"			0:38
6.	"The Fireworks"			2:02
7.	"Vivace – Wood"			1:54
8.	"Stolen Tale – Face to Face"			0:51
9.	"The Glass Moves"			2:29
10.	"People of the House"			1:08
11.	"The Manuscript"			1:16
12.	"Stolen Tale – The Band"			3:47
13.	"Full Circle"			2:04
Total length:				26:59

No.	Title	Writer(s)	Performer	Length
1.	"Gopher Mambo"	Billy May; Conrad Gozzo	Mariam Wallentin	2:32
2.	"Crazy She Calls Me"	Sidney Keith Russell; Carl Sigman	Mariam Wallentin	1:29
3.	"It's oh so quiet"	Hans Lang; Bert Reisfeld	Mariam Wallentin	3:10
4.	"Teach me tonight"	Sammy Cahn	Mariam Wallentin	3:03
Total length:				10:13

== Accolades ==
Award	Date of ceremony	Category	Recipient(s)	Result	Ref.
Astra Film Awards	December 11, 2025	Best Original Score	Hildur Guðnadóttir	Pending	
