= 28 Years Later: The Bone Temple (soundtrack) =

28 Years Later: The Bone Temple (Original Motion Picture Soundtrack)

Film score by Hildur Guðnadóttir
- Released: 16 January 2026
- Recorded: 2025
- Genre: Film score
- Length: 34:48
- Label: Milan
- Producer: Hildur Guðnadóttir

Hildur Guðnadóttir chronology
| Hedda (Original Motion Picture Score) (2025) | 28 Years Later: The Bone Temple (Original Motion Picture Soundtrack) (2026) | The Bride! (Original Motion Picture Soundtrack) (2026) |

28 Years Later: The Bone Temple (Original Motion Picture Soundtrack) is the film score to the 2026 film 28 Years Later: The Bone Temple directed by Nia DaCosta, which is the fourth installment overall in the 28 Days Later film series and a sequel to 28 Years Later (2025).

== Development ==
In December 2024, it was announced that Hildur Guðnadóttir would compose the score for 28 Years Later: The Bone Temple. She collaborated with DaCosta consecutively for the second time after previously working on Hedda (2025). While working on this film, Guðnadóttir felt that she liked to navigate towards darkness and the darkside of human nature, in contrast to her real life, where she was a "happy person".

Milan Records released the score on digital streaming platforms on 16 January 2026, the same day as the film's release. A limited vinyl release of the score was announced by Made by Mutant in partnership with Milan Records on 28 August 2026.

== Track listing ==
All music is composed by Hildur Guðnadóttir.

| No. | Title | Length |
|---|---|---|
| 1. | "Bare Bones" | 1:27 |
| 2. | "Pool Fight" | 2:10 |
| 3. | "Meeting Station" | 1:18 |
| 4. | "Building Temple" | 1:49 |
| 5. | "Temple High" | 1:38 |
| 6. | "Charity" | 1:50 |
| 7. | "The Barn" | 0:41 |
| 8. | "Roof Drop" | 2:01 |
| 9. | "Really Old Nick" | 2:07 |
| 10. | "Ropes" | 1:23 |
| 11. | "Moon" | 3:15 |
| 12. | "Jimmy in the Temple" | 1:54 |
| 13. | "Bone Closure" | 1:10 |
| 14. | "Obey Me" | 4:37 |
| 15. | "All the Jimmys" | 1:05 |
| 16. | "The Bone Temple" | 6:23 |
| Total length: | | 34:48 |

== Reception ==
David Rooney of The Hollywood Reporter wrote "The standout craft element here is a powerful horror score by Hildur Gudnadottir that ranges from solemn, quasi-ecclesiastical passages to gut-churning, droning soundscapes." Mini Anthikkad Chhibber of The Hindu wrote "Icelandic composer Hildur Guðnadóttir has created an exquisite score for this sequel to Danny Boyle's 28 Years Later, with the needle drops flawlessly timed." Amy Nicholson of Los Angeles Times wrote that the "electronica score for strings" provided a different aesthetic.

Kristy Puchko of Mashable India called it a "seething score, made up of orchestrated human moans and gasps". Ross Bonaime of Collider noted "while it's not as in-your-face as the great Young Fathers score from 28 Years Later, [the score] sets just the right tone that simmers underneath the story, plunging you into a world of unease and uncertainty." Bill Bria of /Film called it an "orchestral score". Wendy Ide of The Observer called it an "organic, percussive score [...] music that sounds as though it was played on the Bone Temple itself, beaten out with tibia and fibula on a rib cage glockenspiel." Chris Bumbray of JoBlo.com called the soundtrack as "more conventional".

== Additional music ==
Additional music featured in the film includes the following:

- "Girls On Film" by Duran Duran
- "Ordinary World" by Duran Duran
- "Rio" by Duran Duran
- "Everything in Its Right Place" by Radiohead
- "Osmium 1" and "Osmium 6" by Osmium
- "The Number of the Beast" by Iron Maiden
- "In the House – In a Heartbeat" by John Murphy (from 28 Days Later)
