= Seven (Fever Ray song) =

Single by Fever Ray

from the album Fever Ray
- Released: 5 October 2009
- Genre: Electronic; synthpop
- Length: 5:10 (Album Version); 3:45 (Radio Edit)
- Label: Rabid; Cooperative
- Songwriter(s): Fever Ray
- Producer(s): Fever Ray; Christoffer Berg

Fever Ray singles chronology
"Triangle Walks" (2009)	"Seven" (2009)	"Mercy Street" (2010)

Music video
- "Seven" on YouTube

"Seven" is the fourth single from Swedish recording artist Fever Ray's self-titled debut album, Fever Ray (2009).

== Music video ==
The music video for "Seven" features Kari Sylwan lip-synching to the song. It was directed by Johan Renck.

== Track listing ==
iTunes single

1. "Seven" (Edit) – 3:43
2. "Seven" (CSS Remix) – 5:07
3. "Seven" (Martyn's Seventh Mix) – 4:36
4. "Seven" (Crookers Remix) – 3:56
5. "Seven" (Marcel Dettmann's Voice In My Head) – 5:42
6. "Seven" (Nic Chacona Strobelight Mix) – 6:52
7. "Seven" (Seth Troxler Remix) – 7:10
- UK 12" single

A1. "Seven" (Crookers Remix) – 3:57
A2. "Seven" (Marcel Dettmann's Voice in My Head) – 5:43
B1. "Seven" (Martyn's Seventh Mix) – 4:37
B2. "Seven" (CSS Remix) – 5:07

- UK promo CD single
1. "Seven" (Radio Edit) – 3:45
2. "Seven" (CSS Remix) – 5:09
3. "Seven" (Martyn Remix) – 4:39
4. "Seven" (Crookers Remix) – 3:58
5. "Seven" (Marcel Dettman Remix) – 7:10
6. "Seven" (Nicholas Chacona Remix) – 6:54
7. "Seven" (Seth Troxler Remix) – 7:12
8. "Seven" (Marcel Dettman Whispering Voices Remix) – 5:43

== Charts ==
Chart (2009)	Peak position
Belgian Dance Chart	15
