= Triangle Walks =

Single by Fever Ray

from the album Fever Ray
- Released: 20 July 2009
- Genre: Electronic; art pop
- Length: 4:21 (Album Version); 3:15 (Radio Edit)
- Label: Rabid; Cooperative
- Songwriter(s): Fever Ray
- Producer(s): Fever Ray; Christoffer Berg

Fever Ray singles chronology
"When I Grow Up" (2009)	"Triangle Walks" (2009)	"Seven" (2009)

Music video
- "Triangle Walks" on YouTube

"Triangle Walks" is the third single from Swedish recording artist Fever Ray's self-titled debut album, Fever Ray (2009).

== Music video ==
The music video was directed by Mikel Cee Karlsson. In the video, Fever Ray is seen standing in a room in face paint as watery shadows and darkness envelop them.

== Track listings ==
- iTunes single
1. "Triangle Walks" – 4:22
2. "Triangle Walks" (Ben Hoo's Sill Frame) – 4:27
3. "Triangle Walks" (Spektre Vocal Mix) – 8:11
4. "Triangle Walks" (Tora Vinter Remix) – 5:18
5. "Triangle Walks" (Allez Allez Remix) – 6:09
6. "Triangle Walks" (Tiga's 1-2-3-4 Remix) – 5:17
7. "Triangle Walks" (James Rutledge Remix) – 4:18
8. "Triangle Walks" (Tiga's 1-2-3-4 Remix Instrumental) – 5:19
- Swedish and UK 12" single

A1. "Triangle Walks" (Rex the Dog Remix) – 6:36
B1. "Triangle Walks" (James Rutledge Remix) – 4:29
B2. "Triangle Walks" (Tora Vinter Remix) – 5:21

- UK promo CD single
1. "Triangle Walks" (Radio Edit)
2. "Triangle Walks" (James Rutledge Remix)
3. "Triangle Walks" (Tiga's Radio Edit)
- UK promo CD single (Remixes)
1. "Triangle Walks" (Tiga's 1-2-3-4 Remix) – 5:19
2. "Triangle Walks" (Tiga's 1-2-3-4 Instrumental) – 5:19
3. "Triangle Walks" (Spectre Dub) – 6:43
4. "Triangle Walks" (Spectre Remix) – 8:14
5. "Triangle Walks" (Allez Allez Remix) – 6:12
6. "Triangle Walks" (James Rutledge Remix) – 4:19
7. "Triangle Walks" (Tora Vinter Remix) – 5:19
8. "Triangle Walks" (Rex the Dog Remix) – 6:39
- European promo CD single (Rex the Dog Edit)
1. "Triangle Walks" (Rex the Dog Remix) – 6:36
2. "Triangle Walks" (Rex the Dog Remix - Radio Edit) – 3:15

== Charts ==
Chart (2009)	Peak position
Belgian Dance Chart	20
