= Peter Ågren =

Swedish musician, artist, songwriter, and producer

Peter Ågren is a Swedish songwriter, producer, musician and artist. Credits include The Amplifetes, Tove Styrke, Peter, Bjorn & John and Little Majorette.

He started his career as singer for Swedish powerpop band Grass Show. He went on to sign with renowned publishing company Murlyn Music as a songwriter. In 2008, he joined Swedish electro pop project The Amplifetes, together with Henrik Jonback, Henrik Korpi and Tommy Spaanheden.

Ågren works from his stockholm based studio, frequently collaborating with other writers.

== Discography (selection) ==
=== 2023 ===
The Amplifetes's Spin It (Writer/Producer/Mixer)

- "Spin It"

=== 2021 ===
Little Majorette's Waves (Writer/Producer/Mixer)

- "Not Mine"
- "Les Chasseurs Et Les Cueilleurs"
- "Dear Satellite"
- "Modern Ones"

=== 2019 ===
The Man's Lake, Ocean or Sea (2013) (Writer/Producer/Mixer)

- "Hold On To Nothing"
- "It's A Fever"
- "What I'd Do"
- "Sang For You"
- "A New Song"
- "These Streets"
- "I Don't Mind The Rain"
- "Alright For Now"
- "At Home In Water"
- "There Will Be Rain"
- "Thinking About Leaving"
- "Brought It All On Myself"
- "Never Grown Up"

=== 2016 ===
Peter, Bjorn & John's Breakin' Point

- "A Long Goodbye" (Writer)

=== 2015 ===
Ninsun Poli's Great Leap Forward

- "Great Leap Forward" (Writer/Producer/Mixer)

Lo-Fi-Fnk's Nightclub Nirvana

- "Pirate Radio" (Writer/Producer)
- "Lion's Pride" (Writer/Producer)

=== 2014 ===
Peter Morén's Broken Swenglish VOL 2

- "The Odyssey" (Writer/Producer)

Mr Little Jeans' Pocketknife

- "Valentine" (Writer/Producer)

=== 2012 ===
The Amplifetes' Where Is The Light (Writer/Producer/Artist)

- "Interlude - House Call"
- "Where Is The Light"
- "You Want It"
- "My Heart Is Leaving Town"
- "You/Me/Evolution"
- "Tracey Clark"
- "Keep On Running"
- "Start:Stop"
- "Never Going Back"
- "S.E.O.K.L"
- "This Can't Be It"

Peter Morén's Pyramiden

- "Odyssén" (Writer/Producer)
- "Capri, Cannes & Brighton" (Musician)
- "Säg Mitt Namn" (Musician)
- "Erik M. Nilsson" (Musician)
- "Tröstpriset" (Musician)
- "Budbäraren" (Musician)

=== 2011 ===
Tove Styrke's Tove Styrke 2011 Re-release

- "Call My Name" (Writer/Producer)

=== 2010 ===
Tove Styrke's Tove Styrke

- "White Light Moment" (Writer/Producer)
- "Close Enough" (Writer/Producer)
- "Walking My Daydream" (Writer/Producer)

The Amplifetes' The Amplifetes (Writer/Producer/Artist)

- "Intro"
- "It's My Life"
- "Maxine"
- "Somebody New"
- "Blinded By The Moonlight"
- "When The Music Died"
- "There She Walks" (Mixer)
- "A Million Men" (Mixer)
- "There Will Never Be Another One"
- "Fokker"
- "It Can't Rain All The Time"

Sara Schiralli's Bang Bang

- "Need Some Feeding" (Writer/Producer/Mixer)
- "You Don't Miss What You Never Had" (Writer/Producer/Mixer)
- "This Moment" (Writer/Producer/Mixer)
- "So Raw" (Writer/Producer/Mixer)
