= The Bride! (soundtrack) =

The Bride! (Original Motion Picture Soundtrack)

Soundtrack album by Hildur Guðnadóttir and various artists
- Released: February 27, 2026
- Recorded: 2025–2026
- Genre: Film soundtrack
- Length: 68:49
- Label: WaterTower Music
- Producer: Hildur Guðnadóttir; Randall Poster

Hildur Guðnadóttir chronology
28 Years Later: The Bone Temple (Original Motion Picture Soundtrack) (2025)	The Bride! (Original Motion Picture Soundtrack) (2026)

The Bride! (Original Motion Picture Soundtrack) is the film score composed by Hildur Guðnadóttir to the 2026 film The Bride! directed by Maggie Gyllenhaal starring Jessie Buckley, Christian Bale, Peter Sarsgaard, Annette Bening, Jake Gyllenhaal and Penélope Cruz. The album featured Guðnadóttir's score as well as two original songs composed by Fever Ray and songs contributed by Jake and Buckley. The album was released through WaterTower Music on February 27, 2026.

== Development ==
Jonny Greenwood was initially announced as the film's composer, before he was replaced by Hildur Guðnadóttir in May 2025. Guðnadóttir considered the score to be a mix of punk and romance due to numerous things happening in the world, which intrigued her as a composer. The initial discussion with Maggie was about the love theme as it was the crucial element to establish the musical landscape and once that clicked, the duo discussed about a larger and complex nature of the multifaceted nature and the elements which naturally did not complement each other. From the first place, Guðnadóttir decided to establish a punk and classical world and blend together, and to achieve this, she decided to record the orchestra like a punk band by using stacks of amplifiers and live distortion and in locations that were traditionally used by bands in New York, such as David Bowie, Lou Reed and other iconic pank bands.

Guðnadóttir worked with Amedeo Pace, lead guitarist of Blonde Redhead, Lee Ranaldo, the co-founder of the defunct band Sonic Youth, Mark Ribot and Guðnadóttir's brother Tóti Guǒnason, she considered all the guitarists as "amazing" and had different sensibilities that stand out individually to make them more recognizable and each of them played the guitars in a different way that makes the sound more unique. To achieve the tensions and psychoacoustic elements that provide an electric sensibilities, she preferred utilizing amplifications and distortions while recording a live orchestra or use tense and electric elements to bring an organic tension. Besides the score, the film also featured original songs by Fever Ray as well as Jake and Buckley performing few songs.

== Release ==
The film score was released through WaterTower Music on February 27, 2026.

== Reception ==
Jonathan Broxton of Movie Music UK considered "The Bride is the best score of Guðnadóttir’s career to date, by a considerable margin." Nikki Baughan of Screen International wrote "Hildur Gudnadottir's expressive score also takes in these conflicting notes, which converge in a strange, almost otherworldly harmony." Codie Allen of The Curb wrote "Hildur Guðnadóttir’s music magnifies this intimacy, elevating glances, silences, and touches into seismic emotional moments." James Mottram of NME wrote "Icelandic composer Hildur Guðnadóttir, who did such good work on Joker, delivers a raucous score".

David Rooney of The Hollywood Reporter wrote "Hildur Gudnadóttir’s big string-energy score does the job, but the movie is more committed to its anachronistic use of contemporary music to shake up the attitude". Kimberly Leszak of Fangoria wrote "Hildur Guðnadóttir’s score is a cautionary, flickering nervous system, paired with contemporary soundtrack moments from Swedish artist Fever Ray, threading the film with a pervasive warning that while the story may be set in the 1930s, the danger is timeless". Clarisse Loughrey of The Independent called it a "keening score". Bill Pearis of BrooklynVegan called "The Lake" as a "a patented Karin Dreijer banger, all squelchy, swirling synthesizers that recall Knife jams like 'We Share Our Mother’s Health' and 'You Take My Breath Away'."

== Track listing ==
No.	Title	Artist(s)	Length
1.	"The Fall"		1:57
2.	"I've Got a Feeling I'm Falling"	Jake Gyllenhaal feat. Vince Giordano and the Nighthawks	3:16
3.	"Aren't You Curious?"		1:36
4.	"Reinvigoration"		1:25
5.	"Love Theme #1 / You Have an Amazing Vocabulary"		1:04
6.	"Cooking Breakfast for the One I Love"	Jake Gyllenhaal feat. Vince Giordano and the Nighthawks	3:15
7.	"Wrong Flower" (Cinematic)	Fever Ray	4:35
8.	"The Lake" (Cinematic)	Fever Ray	4:26
9.	"Things Are Looking Up"	Jake Gyllenhaal	3:08
10.	"Wanna Sip"	Fever Ray	3:29
11.	"Gotta Get Out of Here"		0:58
12.	"Love Theme #2 / I Don't Know Where I Live"		1:25
13.	"Knock, Knock"		1:19
14.	"Falling in Love Again (Can't Help It)"	Jessie Buckley	0:41
15.	"The Fountain"		1:42
16.	"Love Theme #3 / I Can't Remember My Name"		1:30
17.	"Puttin' on the Ritz = The Bride! Orchestra"		2:29
18.	"Brain Attack"		2:03
19.	"Love Theme #4 / Someone Oughta Cut Your F***ing Tongue Out"		1:20
20.	"Ida Rather Been Called Something Else"		4:04
21.	"Wiles Talks / Obliterated"		4:39
22.	"My Sin"	Jake Gyllenhaal feat. Vince Giordano and the Nighthawks	4:23
23.	"'Til Death Do Us Part"		1:51
24.	"Just The Bride"		1:17
25.	"I Would Prefer Not To"		2:01
26.	"'Til the End of Time"		2:51
27.	"I Have to Have You" (Bonus Track)	Jake Gyllenhaal feat. Vince Giordano and the Nighthawks	3:04
28.	"Ain'tcha" (Bonus Track)	Jake Gyllenhaal feat. Vince Giordano and the Nighthawks	3:01
Total length:			68:49

== Personnel ==
Credits adapted from WaterTower Music:

- Music composer and producer: Hildur Guðnadóttir
- Music supervisor: Randall Poster
- Additional music: Philip Klein
- Supervising music editor: Joseph S. DeBeasi
- Music editors: Jason Ruder, John Carbonara
- Music coordinator: Meghan Currier
- Music clearance: Jessica Dolinger
- Music arrangements: David Chase, Mark Lopeman
- Music preparation by: Black Ribbon
- Score crchestrator: Philip Klein
- Score conductor: Lucas Richman
- Score recording: Derik Lee
- Score mixing: Alex Venguer
- Score supervisor: Sam Slater
- Score programming: Samuel Schwenk, Caleb Blood
- Score coordinator: Sandra Park
- Sequencer programmer: Jakob Vasak
- Score recordist: Neal Shaw

Featured musicians

- Vocals and percussion: Hildur Guðnadóttir
- Guitar: Amedeo Pace, Tóti Gudnason, Lee Ranaldo, Marc Ribot, Mason Lindahl
- Cello: Hildur Guðnadóttir, Jerry Grossman
- Drums: Steve Shelley, Samuli Kosminen, Dezron Douglas
- Saxophone and bass clarinet: David Murray
- Bass: Josh Evans
- Violin: Yuki Numata Resnick
