= The Amplifetes =

Swedish band

- Origin: Sweden
- Genres: Electronic, synthpop, electro house, alternative dance, garage house
- Years active: 2008–present
- Members: Henrik Jonback; Henrik Korpi; Tommy Spaanheden; Peter Ågren

The Amplifetes is a 4-piece band from Sweden. Influences range along a broad spectrum, including 60s psychedelia, the Electric Light Orchestra, The Ramones, Elvis Costello, David Bowie, and Chicago Trax Records. The individual members have had success as songwriters and producers, working with artists such as Kelis, Britney Spears, Madonna, Kylie Minogue, and Grandmaster Flash.

The band has been active since 2008. In 2010, they released their eponymous debut album. Four singles were taken from this album: "It's My Life", "Whizz Kid", "Somebody New", and "Blinded By The Moonlight". Following this, the band toured extensively over Europe for two years.

Early summer 2012 saw the first sign of post-debut activity, as their new song Where Is The Light was launched, together with an accompanying internet video game. The full follow-up album Where Is The Light was released in early 2013, with cover artwork supplied by Storm Thorgersen and the additional singles "You/Me/Evolution" and "You Want It".

The Amplifetes and their music have appeared in Vogue Italia, Gaffa magazine, Virgin Radio live, Empreintes-digitales, It´s Pop, Kulturnews, Zeromagazine, and Fred Perry Subculture.

The Amplifetes music have been used in various soundtrack areas. The appearance of "It's My Life" in an advertisement for the Roberto Cavalli credit card starring Milla Jovovich and "Somebody New" in a Garnier Fructis promotion and the TV-series 90210 are some examples. After a 10 year hiatus the band made a comeback in 2023 with the new single "Spin It".

== Discography ==
Albums
Year	Album	Album details
2010	The Amplifetes	Released in sept 2010; Label: Amp Music, Believe Digital/EMI, Ministry Of Sound, Playground
2013	Where Is the Light	Released in Scandinavia/France, February 11 (released world wide August 2013)

Singles
Year	Single	Album
2008	It's my life	The Amplifetes
2009	Whizz Kid	The Amplifetes
2010	Somebody new	The Amplifetes
2011	Blinded by the moonlight	The Amplifetes
2012	Where is the light	Where is the Light
2012	You/Me/Evolution	Where is the Light
2013	You Want It	Where is the Light
2023	Spin It	
2025	Idiots	

== Remixes ==
The Amplifetes remixed:

- You/Me/Evolution - Michael Cassette Remix
- Where Is The Light - Samuel Onervas Remix
- Where Is The Light - MTheM Remix
- It's my life - Van Rivers and The Subliminal Kid Remix
- It's my life - General MIDI Remix
- It's my life - Dan F Remix
- Whizz Kid - Blende Remix
- Whizz Kid - The Subliminal Kid Remix
- Somebody new - Claes Rosén Remix
- Somebody new - POLP Remix
- Somebody new - Chopstick Dub Remix
- Somebody new - Adrian Bood Remix
- Blinded by the moonlight - Little Majorette Remix
- Blinded by the moonlight - FUKKK OFFF Remix

Remixed by The Amplifetes:

- Little Majorette - London
- Pony Pony Run Run - Walking On A Line
- Jennie Abrahamson - Hard To Come By

== Computer Games ==
- Where Is The Light video game

== Promotion Videos ==
- It's my life - Directed by Tommy Spaanheden
- Whizz Kid - Directed by Anders Hellman
- Somebody New - Directed by Anders Hellman and Emma Hanquist
- Blinded by the moonlight - Directed by Mattias Johansson
- Blinded by the moonlight (Fukkk Offf Remix Edit) - Directed by Mattias Johansson & Erik Ande
- The Amplifetes EPK on Vimeo
- Where Is The Light Trailer
- You/Me/Evolution - Directed By Mikel Cee Karlsson
- You Want It - Directed By Mikel Cee Karlsson
