= When I Grow Up (Fever Ray song) =

Single by Fever Ray

from the album Fever Ray
- B-side: "Memories from When I Grew Up (Remembered by The Subliminal Kid)"
- Released: 30 March 2009
- Genre: Art pop; dark wave; synthpop
- Length: 4:31 (Album Version); 3:42 (Radio Edit)
- Label: Rabid; Cooperative
- Songwriter: Fever Ray
- Producers: Van Rivers & The Subliminal Kid

Fever Ray singles chronology
"If I Had a Heart" (2008)	"When I Grow Up" (2009)	"Triangle Walks" (2009)

Music video
- "When I Grow Up" on YouTube

"When I Grow Up" is the second single from Swedish recording artist Fever Ray's self-titled debut album, Fever Ray (2009).

== Critical reception ==
Pitchfork Media placed "When I Grow Up" at number 36 on the website's list of The Top 100 Tracks of 2009.

== Music video ==
The music video for "When I Grow Up" was directed by Martin de Thurah. He said of the video's visual statement:

"That initial idea was something about something coming out of water—something which was about to take form – a state turning into something new. And a double headed creature not deciding which where [sic] to turn. But the idea had to take a simpler form, to let the song grow by itself. I remembered a photo I took in Croatia two years ago, a swimming pool with its shining blue color in a grey foggy autumn landscape."

The video premiered on Fever Ray's YouTube channel on 19 February 2009. It has received over 12 million views as of March 2016.

"When I Grow Up" was placed at number three on Spin's list of The 20 Best Videos of 2009.

== Track listings ==
- iTunes single
1. "When I Grow Up" – 4:31
2. "When I Grow Up" (Håkan Lidbo's Encephalitis Remix) – 5:59
3. "When I Grow Up" (D. Lissvik) – 4:28
4. "Memories from When I Grew Up (Remembered by The Subliminal Kid)" – 16:41
5. "When I Grow Up" (Van Rivers Dark Sails on the Horizon Mix) – 9:16
6. "When I Grow Up" (We Grow Apart Vocal Version by Pär Grindvik) – 6:02
7. "When I Grow Up" (We Grow Apart Inspiration - Take 2 - By Pär Grindvik) – 7:59
8. "When I Grow Up" (Scuba's High Up Mix) – 6:17
9. "When I Grow Up" (Scuba's Straight Down Mix) – 5:54
10. "When I Grow Up" (Video) – 4:04
- Swedish 12" single

A1. "When I Grow Up" (Van Rivers Dark Sails on the Horizon Mix) – 9:10
A2. "When I Grow Up" (D. Lissvik) – 4:28
B1. "Memories from When I Grew Up (Remembered by The Subliminal Kid)" – 16:41

- UK promo CD single
1. "When I Grow Up" (Edit) – 3:42
2. "When I Grow Up" (D. Lissvik Radio Edit) – 3:19

== Nominations ==
Year	Category	Genre	Recording	Result
UK Music Video Awards
2009	Best Indie/Alternative	Music Video	When I Grow Up	Nominated

== Appearances in other media ==
The song was used as part of the soundtrack for the video game Pro Evolution Soccer 2011.
