= Fever Ray (album) =

Studio album by Fever Ray
- Released: 12 January 2009
- Genre: Electronic pop
- Length: 48:05
- Label: Rabid
- Producers: Christoffer Berg; Fever Ray; Van Rivers & The Subliminal Kid

Fever Ray chronology
Fever Ray (2009)	Live in Luleå (2012)

Singles from Fever Ray
- 1. "If I Had a Heart" Released: 15 December 2008; 2. "When I Grow Up" Released: 30 March 2009; 3. "Triangle Walks" Released: 20 July 2009; 4. "Seven" Released: 5 October 2009

Fever Ray is the debut solo studio album by Fever Ray, the solo musical project of Swedish singer-songwriter Karin Dreijer, known for their work as one half of the electronic duo the Knife. It was released on 12 January 2009 by Rabid Records. The album spawned four singles: "If I Had a Heart", "When I Grow Up", "Triangle Walks" and "Seven".

== Critical reception ==
Professional ratings
Aggregate scores
Source	Rating
AnyDecentMusic?	7.8/10
Metacritic	81/100
Review scores
Source	Rating
AllMusic	4/5 stars
The A.V. Club	A−
The Guardian	5/5 stars
The Independent	5/5 stars
MSN Music (Consumer Guide)	A−
NME	8/10
The Observer	4/5 stars
Pitchfork	8.1/10
Q	4/5 stars
Spin	7/10

Fever Ray was lauded by music critics. At Metacritic, which assigns a normalised rating out of 100 to reviews from mainstream critics, the album received an average score of 81, based on 27 reviews, which indicates "universal acclaim".

Graeme Thomson of The Observer described the album as "an astonishingly stark record" that is "[b]uilt on the barest of electronic bones and brought to life through [Dreijer]'s almost primal vocals, the songs search for a spiritual pulse amid soulless modernity". Ian Mathers of PopMatters stated that the album is "not only as good as Silent Shout but [it's also] clearly akin to the sound [they] and [their] brother Olof perfected on that record", concluding: "Nothing that Fever Ray does is as immediate or soaring as a track like 'Marble House' but Fever Ray makes up for the lack of highs by being an even more all-enveloping experience than the last few Knife records." Similarly, John Doran of the NME commented that Fever Ray "has none of the immediacy of albums such as the Knife's Silent Shout, with its playful eclecticism and heavier, dancefloor-leaning beats. Most importantly, it doesn't have a killer hit single in the style of 'Heartbeats'", adding that in order to "fully appreciate this beautiful and understated gem, [...] it's important to relinquish all desires for another 'Heartbeats' and enter fully into the world of Fever Ray." Doran also called the album "magnetic and rewarding" and compared it to the likes of Kate Bush, Underworld and Yellow Magic Orchestra.

Pitchfork argued that, in contrast to the Knife's "plasticky percussions and goofy synth sounds", Fever Ray "brims with fragile, more finely articulated sounds" and "moves at roughly the same pace and with the same general tone, rendering some of the songs indistinguishable at first, but committed listens will reveal this to be as nuanced and as rich of a production as anything either Dreijer has done". The A.V. Club's Chris Martins viewed it as being "countless times more claustrophobic and creepy than Silent Shout" and stated that "[t]he vocal transformer is such a huge part of what [Dreijer] does—androgynizing [their] words to accompany the cold music, mimicking the synth warbles and sustained tones that abound". The Independent critic Rupert Howe expressed: "Even beyond the gothic imagery and glacial electronics, this mesmeric solo project shares much with the Knife's last album Silent Shout", including "surreal lyrics" and "weird vocal treatments which pitch [Dreijer]'s voice down to a baleful masculine groan". Jonathan Keefe of Slant Magazine found that the album is "built upon contrasts. Most notably, [Dreijer]'s Fever Ray persona draws attention to [their] work as half of the Knife [...] Whereas the Knife is ostensibly a dance act, Fever Ray emphasizes tone over rhythm." In a review rated 7.5 out of 10, XLR8R wrote that it "retains real emotional heft" and compared it to the likes of Madonna, Siouxsie and the Banshees and PJ Harvey.

Alexander Tudor wrote for Drowned in Sound that "minimal beats on each track prove to have been constructed with incredible attention to detail, as are the smooth synth washes, and electronic simulacra of birdcall or animal noises. The tempo may be nightmarishly unvaried, track after track, but it's composed of glitches [and] bouncing balls", citing "Keep the Streets Empty for Me" as the album's best track. In a review for AllMusic, Heather Phares opined that "Fever Ray's mix of confessional lyrics and chilly, blatantly synthetic and often harsh sounds make this album as successful an electronic singer/songwriter album as Björk's Homogenic." Phares continued: "With almost tangible textures and a striking mood of isolation and singularity, Fever Ray is a truly strange but riveting album." Alexis Petridis of The Guardian felt that the album's "dolorous chords and stately rhythms recall the Cure, circa Faith, the glacial pace makes you think of the Blue Nile", noting that, "as unlikely a step as Fever Ray may seem for one of electronic music's most enigmatic figures, the results are triumphant". BBC Music's Chris Jones called the album "bloody marvellous", while observing "a vague sense of holding pattern here rather than massive innovation. Without brother Olof as a guiding hand on the droning sequencers the tunes fall a bit by the wayside", but wrote that "this very tiny drawback doesn't stop Fever Ray from being the kind of brilliant album that it may not make sense to play if you're prone to nightmares".

=== Accolades ===
The Guardian named Fever Ray the second best album of 2009, calling it "[g]lacial, creepy and impish" and commenting, "Between the cavernous synths, the echoes and loops, the polyrhythms and snarling vocal processing, [Dreijer] managed to capture the feeling of being totally alone while also projecting a childlike wonder". It was ranked the second best album of 2009 and twenty-fourth best album of the 2000s decade by Resident Advisor. The Sunday Times named Fever Ray the third best album of 2009 by a new artist and wrote that [Dreijer] "responded to motherhood with an album of glacial sonic architecture, its unforgiving expanses conjuring up sleep-deprived mental churning", dubbing it an "electro classic". NME, Drowned in Sound and Pitchfork all placed the album at number nine on their respective lists of the Top 50 Albums of 2009, with the latter noting that "[w]hat's made [Dreijer]'s work even better is how [their] videos and performances amplify the music's sense of dread and mystery".

The album was listed at number sixteen on PopMatters' The Best 60 Albums of 2009, and the website opined: "Alternately chilly and warm, wistful and foreboding, expansive and claustrophobic, Fever Ray's peculiarity and bleak magnificence holds us in its thrall." Online music service Rhapsody included Fever Ray at number 22 on its list of The 25 Best Albums of 2009. Slant Magazine named it the 24th best album of 2009, stating that [Dreijer] "challenges the conventions of dance music with [their] distorted vocals and macabre imagery" the album "emerges as an unsettling, impossible-to-shake record that suggests the aftermath of when 'pop' truly bursts". iTunes US named Fever Ray the best electronic album of 2009 as part of its Rewind 2009 roundup. It was included on AllMusic's Favorite Albums of 2009 and Favorite Electronic Albums of 2009 lists.

In 2010, Fever Ray won the P3 Guld award for Dance Artist of the Year and was nominated for Newcomer of the Year and Pop Artist of the Year. The same year, the singer won a Manifestgalan for Best Live Artist and received a Beatport Music Award nomination for Best Electronica Artist.

== Track listing ==
All lyrics are written by Fever Ray, except where noted.

No.	Title	Producer(s)	Length
1.	"If I Had a Heart"	Fever Ray; Christoffer Berg	3:49
2.	"When I Grow Up"	Fever Ray; Van Rivers & The Subliminal Kid	4:31
3.	"Dry and Dusty"	Fever Ray; Berg	3:45
4.	"Seven"	Fever Ray; Berg	5:10
5.	"Triangle Walks"	Fever Ray; Berg	4:23
6.	"Concrete Walls"	Fever Ray; Van Rivers & The Subliminal Kid	5:40
7.	"Now's the Only Time I Know"	Fever Ray; Van Rivers & The Subliminal Kid	3:59
8.	"I'm Not Done"	Fever Ray; Van Rivers & The Subliminal Kid	4:20
9.	"Keep the Streets Empty for Me" (lyrics by Fever Ray and Cecilia Nordlund)	Fever Ray; Berg	5:40
10.	"Coconut"	Fever Ray; Van Rivers & The Subliminal Kid	6:48

Japanese edition bonus tracks
No.	Title	Length
11.	"If I Had a Heart" (Familjen Remix)	3:56
12.	"When I Grow Up" (Van Rivers Dark Sails on the Horizon Mix)	9:18
13.	"If I Had a Heart" (Fuck Buttons Remix)	8:26

=== Deluxe edition ===
Disc one
No.	Title	Length
11.	"Stranger than Kindness" (Nick Cave cover) (Anita Lane, Blixa Bargeld)	5:00
12.	"Here Before" (Vashti Bunyan cover) (Bunyan)	3:15

Disc two (DVD)
No.	Title	Director	Length
1.	"If I Had a Heart" (music video)	Andreas Nilsson
2.	"When I Grow Up" (music video)	Martin de Thurah
3.	"Triangle Walks" (music video)	Mikel Cee Karlsson
4.	"Seven" (music video)	Johan Renck
5.	"Stranger than Kindness" (music video)	Nilsson
6.	"Fever Ray Tour Trailer 2009" (video)	Cecilia Nordlund

Disc three (North American exclusive bonus CD): Live in Luleå
No.	Title	Length
1.	"If I Had a Heart"	5:07
2.	"Triangle Walks"	4:21
3.	"Concrete Walls"	6:00
4.	"Seven"	5:36
5.	"I'm Not Done"	4:40
6.	"Now's the Only Time I Know"	3:55
7.	"Keep the Streets Empty for Me"	5:43
8.	"Dry and Dusty"	3:39
9.	"Stranger than Kindness"	5:05
10.	"When I Grow Up"	5:36
11.	"Here Before"	3:44
12.	"Coconut"	8:02

== Personnel ==
Credits for adapted the liner notes of Fever Ray.

=== Musicians ===
- Fever Ray – vocals
- Cecilia Nordlund – vocals (track 9)
- Hampus Lundgren – double bass (track 8)

=== Technical personnel ===
- Fever Ray – mixing, production, recording
- Christoffer Berg – mixing (all tracks); production, recording (tracks 1, 3–5, 9)
- Henrik Jonsson – mastering
- Van Rivers & The Subliminal Kid – mixing, production, recording (tracks 2, 6–8, 10)

=== Artwork ===
- Martin Ander – cover design

== Charts ==
Chart (2009–10)	Peak position
Australian Albums (ARIA)	71
Belgian Albums (Ultratop Flanders)	11
Belgian Alternative Albums (Ultratop Flanders)	7
Danish Albums (Hitlisten)	11
Dutch Albums (Album Top 100)	80
Finnish Albums (Suomen virallinen lista)	29
Irish Albums (IRMA)	50
Norwegian Albums (VG-lista)	9
Swedish Albums (Sverigetopplistan)	8
UK Albums (Official Charts)	90
US Independent Albums (Billboard)	42
US Top Dance Albums (Billboard)	8
US Heatseekers Albums (Billboard)	10

As of October 2009 it has sold 23,000 copies in United States according to Nielsen SoundScan.

== Release history ==
Region	Date	Format	Edition	Label	Ref.
Australia	12 January 2009	Digital download	Standard	Etcetc	
Germany	12 January 2009	Digital download	Standard	Cooperative	
Ireland	12 January 2009	Digital download	Standard	Rabid	
Japan	12 January 2009	Digital download	Standard	Hostess	
Sweden	12 January 2009	Digital download	Standard	Rabid	
United Kingdom	12 January 2009	Digital download	Standard	Rabid	
United States	13 January 2009	Digital download	Standard	Mute	
Sweden	18 March 2009	CD; LP	Standard	Rabid	
Australia	20 March 2009	CD	Standard	Etcetc	
United States	24 March 2009	CD; LP	Standard	Mute	
Germany	27 March 2009	CD	Standard	Cooperative	
Ireland	27 March 2009	CD	Standard	Rabid	
United Kingdom	30 March 2009	CD; LP	Standard	Rabid	
Japan	27 May 2009	CD	Standard	Hostess	
Sweden	14 October 2009	CD + DVD; digital download	Deluxe	Rabid	
United Kingdom	19 October 2009	CD + DVD; digital download	Deluxe	Rabid	
Germany	20 November 2009	CD + DVD; digital download	Deluxe	Cooperative	
United States	23 November 2009	CD + DVD; digital download	Deluxe	Mute	
