= If I Had a Heart =

Single by Fever Ray

from the album Fever Ray
- Released: 15 December 2008
- Length: 3:50
- Label: Rabid
- Songwriter: Fever Ray
- Producers: Fever Ray; Christoffer Berg

Fever Ray singles chronology
"If I Had a Heart" (2008)	"When I Grow Up" (2009)

Music video
- "If I Had a Heart" on YouTube

"If I Had a Heart" is a song performed, written, and produced by Swedish recording artist Fever Ray (Karin Dreijer). It was released as the lead single from their self-titled debut album, Fever Ray (2009), marking Ray's debut single as a solo artist, after their work with their previous band, The Knife. The track was first released digitally in Sweden and across Europe on 15 December 2008 by Rabid Records, followed by a digital EP release on 26 January 2009. It was later released on CD, 7", and 12" formats in early 2009. The single's B-side premiered three days prior to the single release on Stereogum and is a remix of the track done by English experimental duo Fuck Buttons, the duo's maiden work as remixers.

== Background ==
The song takes on a generally unconventional, dark, and experimental style with its slow tempo, organ backing, repetitive synth beat, and distinct vocals. Dreijer teamed up with long-term production partner Christoffer Berg (well known for his work with The Knife) for the production of "If I Had a Heart". The single, like the rest of the tracks on Fever Ray, was written by Dreijer themself. The lyrics were inspired by observation of their young children — a motif evident in the lyrics "Dangling feet from window frame / Will they ever ever reach the floor / More give me more give me more". Also featured on the single is a remix by Stockholm-based techno/electropop artist Familjen. In a Q&A, Dreijer stated that they achieved the pulsating production in the song by sampling an acoustic guitar recording to make a loop.

The official video, directed by Andreas Nilsson, was nominated for Best Indie/Alternative at the 2009 UK Music Video Awards.

== Critical reception ==
The single received universal acclaim from various music critics. Daily Music Guide likened the track to scenes from a film Jim Jarmusch would make, as well as to the Francis Ford Coppola film Apocalypse Now (1979). Their review went on to describe the song as "dark and hypnotic", and "[taking] an echo of a Native American cry, but still [...] maintaining the song's dark undertone." Mark Pytlik of Pitchfork Media reviewed it as "a shivering, timely meditation on greed, immorality, and lust for power that dovetails nicely with AIG and Madoff." Anthony Balderrama from Consequence of Sound positively opined that "the most notable quality of 'If I Had a Heart' is its similarity to some of the quieter tracks on Silent Shout, particularly 'From Off to On'", whilst describing it as "a four-minute dirge that bemoans inadequacy as much as it professes love." PopMatters's Ian Mathers ranked "If I Had a Heart" among Ray's best work, boasting it as "[marrying her] more introspective side with something like the withdrawn inverse of Silent Shout's low, twinkling throb." Graeme Thomson of The Observer labelled the track as an "ancient shamanic chant piped through an iPhone."

In October 2011, NME placed it at number 145 on its list "150 Best Tracks of the Past 15 Years".

== Track listings ==
iTunes EP

1. "If I Had a Heart" – 3:48
2. "If I Had a Heart" (Familjen Remix) – 3:54
3. "If I Had a Heart" (Fuck Buttons Remix) – 8:26
- Swedish promo CD single
1. "If I Had a Heart" – 3:50
- Swedish 12" single

A. "If I Had a Heart" (Fuck Buttons Remix) – 8:26
B. "If I Had a Heart" (Familjen Remix) – 3:54

- UK 7" single

A. "If I Had a Heart" (Original Version) – 3:50
B. "If I Had a Heart" (Fuck Buttons Remix) – 8:26

== Nominations ==
Year	Category	Genre	Recording	Result
UK Music Video Awards
2009	Best Indie/Alternative	Music Video	If I Had a Heart	Nominated

== Charts ==
Chart (2015)	Peak position
Belgium Back Catalogue Singles (Ultratop Wallonia)	41
