= Karin Dreijer =

Swedish musician (born 1975)

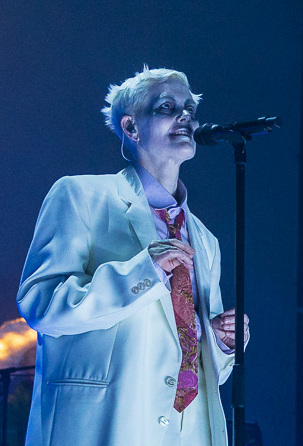
- Dreijer performing as Fever Ray in 2023 at Sentrum Scene in Oslo

Background information
- Also known as: Fever Ray
- Born: Karin Elisabeth Dreijer; 7 April 1975 (age 51); Gothenburg, Sweden
- Genres: Electropop; ambient; trip hop; experimental
- Occupations: Singer-songwriter; record producer
- Instruments: Vocals; guitar; keyboards
- Years active: 1994–present
- Labels: Rabid; Brille; Mute; Cooperative
- Formerly of: Honey Is Cool; The Knife
- Website: feverray.com

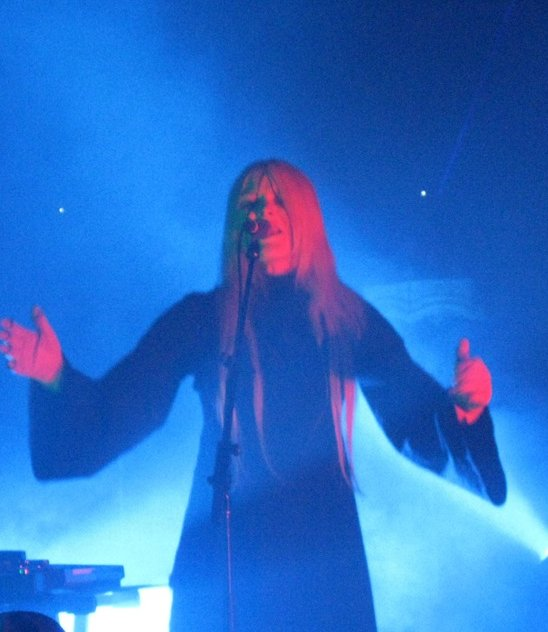
Dreijer performing as Fever Ray in 2009

Karin Elisabeth Dreijer (born 7 April 1975) is a Swedish singer-songwriter and record producer. Dreijer was one half of the electronic music duo the Knife, formed with their brother Olof Dreijer. They released their debut solo album under the alias Fever Ray in January 2009. Their second studio album, Plunge, under the same alias, was released in October 2017.

Dreijer's vocal style is notable for both shrill and deep tones, and also the use of multitracked vocals with the use of pitch-shifting technology. Visually, they use masks, face and body paint, intricate costumes, and other theatrical elements in photo shoots, videos and live performances, during which they often perform behind a gauze screen that partially obscures the audience's view.

== Early life ==
Dreijer was born on 7 April 1975 in Gothenburg, Sweden. They started playing guitar at the age of ten, which led to the founding of the band Honey Is Cool in 1994. Before pursuing a career in music, Dreijer worked as a web designer. In 1998, they moved to Stockholm.

== Career ==
=== The Knife ===
Karin and their brother Olof Dreijer formed the electronic music duo the Knife in Gothenburg in 1999. The Knife released their eponymous debut album in 2001. The duo gained a wider international recognition following the release of "Heartbeats", the lead single of their second studio album, Deep Cuts (2003). The duo performed live for the first time in 2006, when they went on the Silent Shout Tour in support of their third album of the same name (2006). In 2009, the duo were commissioned alongside Mt. Sims and Planningtorock by the Danish performance group Hotel Pro Forma to compose an opera, titled Tomorrow, in a Year, which is based on Charles Darwin's On the Origin of Species. In 2013, the band released their fourth and final studio album, Shaking the Habitual. The duo disbanded in November 2014, after completing the Shaking the Habitual Tour.

=== Solo work ===
While the Knife were on hiatus, Dreijer released their self-titled solo debut album under the alias Fever Ray. It was released digitally on 12 January 2009 and physically on 18 March 2009 through Rabid Records. The album was preceded by its lead single "If I Had a Heart" (2008), which was used in numerous television series, including Person of Interest, Breaking Bad and Wentworth, as well as the opening theme song for the Canadian–Irish historical drama television series Vikings.

In September 2009, Dreijer composed the soundtrack to Dirty Diaries, a collection of feminist pornographic short films. In a review of the collection, Swedish newspaper Smålandsposten described the soundtrack as appropriate for the film, though repetitive.

Dreijer performed as Fever Ray at the 2010 Coachella Festival and received positive reviews. In September of the same year, they performed at Electric Picnic in Ireland.

Contrary to a statement from the film's director, Dreijer did not make a cameo appearance in the 2011 film Red Riding Hood. However, the soundtrack features a new track performed by Dreijer as Fever Ray, "The Wolf", as well as "Keep the Streets Empty for Me" from their debut album. "The Wolf" was also featured in Ubisoft's Far Cry Primal announcement trailer, as well as during the game's final mission.

Dreijer wrote the music for the theatrical adaptation of Ingmar Bergman's 1968 horror film Hour of the Wolf, which premiered at Stockholm's Royal Dramatic Theatre on 12 March 2011. One of these tracks, "No Face", appeared in demo form on the 2012 compilation album We Are the Works in Progress, organised by Blonde Redhead to benefit victims of the 2011 Japanese tsunami.

In February 2016, Dreijer announced that they had written and produced music for a theater play called Vahák (English: Violence), which plays on themes of colonial and homophobic violence. That same month, Dreijer revealed in an interview with The Fader that they were working on solo music, though they were unsure whether it will be under the Fever Ray moniker.

On 20 October 2017, Dreijer released the single "To the Moon and Back" and its accompanying music video. It served as the lead single to their second studio album, Plunge, which was released on 27 October without prior announcement. The album received widespread acclaim from music critics upon release and appeared on numerous year-end lists. In support of the album, Dreijer embarked on an international tour throughout 2018, with the first leg of which was held in Europe and began in February, followed by a North American leg held in May. More European dates were later added from June until November.

In the 2018 Swedish Grammys, Dreijer and the producers they collaborated with on Plunge won the award for "Producer of the Year". Plunge was also nominated for Best European Independent Album at the IMPALA awards.

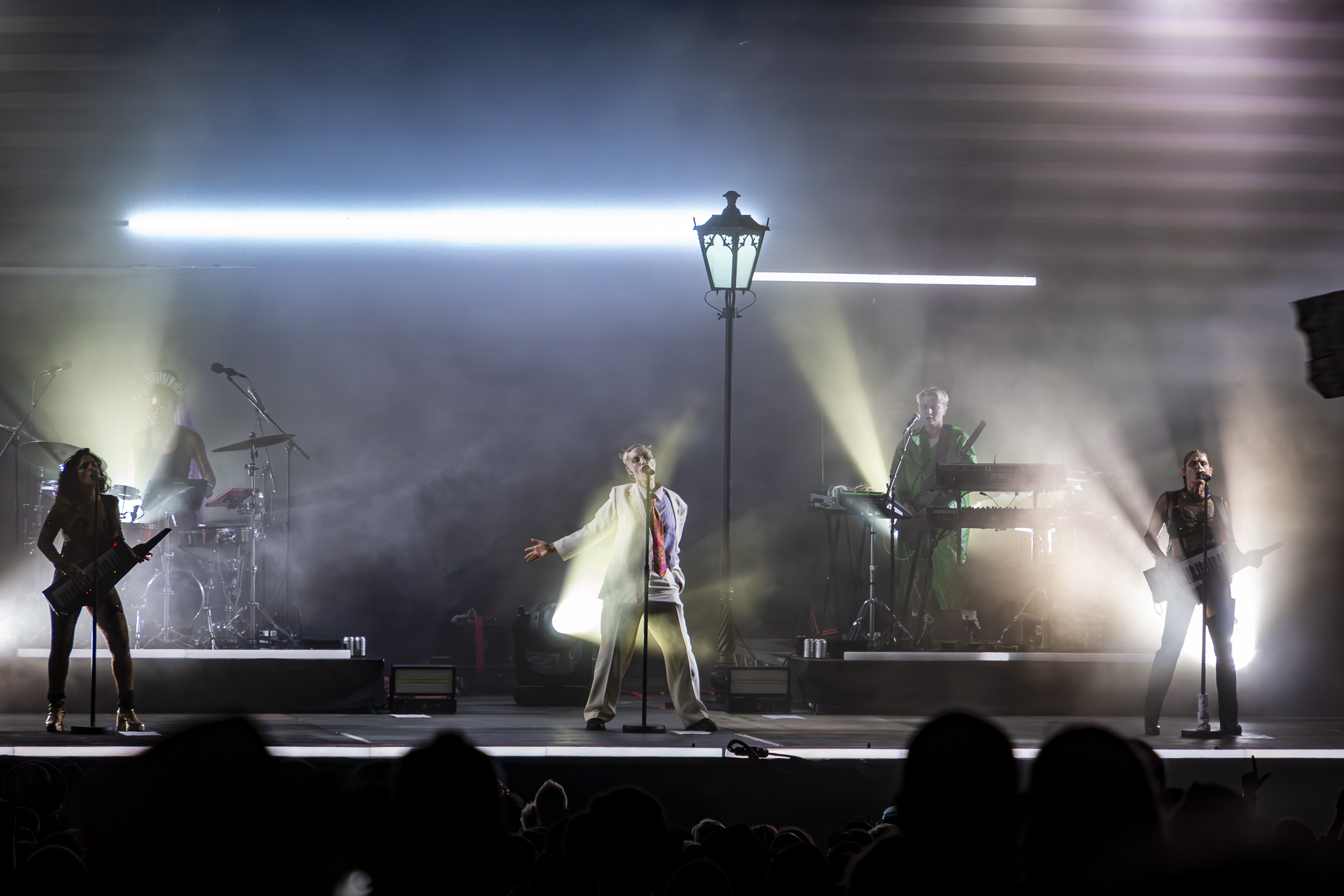
Fever Ray performing at Glastonbury Festival in 2023

On 10 March 2023, Fever Ray released their third album, Radical Romantics, on Rabid Records.

On 25 July 2025, Fever Ray released The Year of the Radical Romantics, a retrospective album that consists of live version of tracks from 2023's Radical Romantics, highlights from 2017's Plunge, and new iterations of early classics, reimagined with the help of musicians who accompanied Fever Ray on their There's No Place I'd Rather Be Tour.

=== Collaborations ===
In 2005, Dreijer supplied vocals on the track "What Else Is There?" by Röyksopp on the album The Understanding. The song charted highly, raising Dreijer's profile at an early stage of their career. They also appeared in the video for that single, but not as the vocalist, who was portrayed by the Norwegian model Marianne Schröder. In 2008, Dreijer provided vocals for the Deus song "Slow" from the band's Vantage Point album. Dreijer was featured on the tracks "This Must Be It" and "Tricky Tricky" again by Röyksopp, appearing on their 2009 album Junior. On 6 September 2019, a collaborative EP between Björk, Dreijer (credited as Fever Ray), and the Knife titled Country Creatures was released. It contains remixes of Björk's song "Features Creatures" by Dreijer and by the Knife as well as a remix of Dreijer's "This Country" by Björk.

== Influences ==
When producing and presenting a radioprogram for Swedish Sveriges Radio in June 2004 about the state of music and what it was like to be a musician in the 21st century, Dreijer chose a list of songs, including "I Don't Give A" by Peaches, "Legs" by PJ Harvey, "We Don't Play Guitars" by Chicks On Speed, "Disconnect" by Plastikman, "I'm Dancing In The Show Tonight" by Ween, "Running Up That Hill" by Kate Bush, "Meet Sue Be She" by Miss Kittin, "Ensam Tempo" by Jenny Wilson, "Kiss Them for Me" by Siouxsie and the Banshees, "Tha" by Aphex Twin, "Panty Lies" by Sonic Youth and "On Guard" by Le Tigre. They have also named Courtney Love, Kim Gordon, and Kim Deal as artistic influences.

== Personal life ==
Dreijer largely keeps their private life outside the headlines, but in 2017, they told The Guardian in an interview that they had been married and had dropped Andersson from their name following their divorce. In the same interview, they described themself as "definitely a queer person, but [...] very gender-fluid". Dreijer previously used she/her pronouns, but beginning in 2019 uses the pronouns they/them in English and hen in Swedish. They have two daughters. On a radio interview in 2023, they shared that they are autistic.

== Awards and nominations ==
Award	Year	Category	Nominee(s)	Result	Ref.
AIM Independent Music Awards	2018	Best Sophomore Release	Plunge	Nominated	
Antville Music Video Awards	2009	Best Cinematography	"If I Had a Heart"	Nominated	
Antville Music Video Awards	2009	Best Cinematography	"When I Grow Up"	Nominated	
Berlin Music Video Awards	2018	Best Song	"To the Moon and Back"	Nominated	
Berlin Music Video Awards	2024	Most Bizzare	"Shiver"	Nominated	
Camerimage	2010	Best Music Video	"Stranger Than Kindness"	Nominated	
Grammis	2023	Video of the Year	"What They Call Us"	Won	
Grammis	2024	Lyricist of the Year	Themself	Won	
Grammis	2024	Producer of the Year	Themself	Nominated	
Grammis	2024	Alternative Pop of the Year	Themself	Nominated	
Grammis	2024	Video of the Year	"Kandy"	Nominated	
IMPALA Awards	2018	Album of the Year	Plunge	Nominated	
Musikförläggarnas Pris	2018	Composer of the Year	Themself	Nominated	
Musikförläggarnas Pris	2023	International Success	Themself	Nominated	
P3 Guld Music Awards	2010	Best New Artist	Themself	Nominated	
P3 Guld Music Awards	2010	Best Dance	Themself	Won	
P3 Guld Music Awards	2010	Best Pop	Themself	Nominated	
P3 Guld Music Awards	2019	Guldmicken	Themself	Nominated	
Rober Awards Music Prize	2009	Best Female Artist	Themself	Nominated	
Rober Awards Music Prize	2009	Best European Artist	Themself	Nominated	
Rober Awards Music Prize	2009	Best Electronica	Themself	Nominated	
Rober Awards Music Prize	2017	Best Electronica	Themself	Nominated	
Rober Awards Music Prize	2017	Best Female Artist	Themself	Nominated	
Sweden GAFFA Awards	2018	Electronic of the Year	Themself	Won	
UK Music Video Awards	2009	Best Indie/Alternative Video	"If I Had a Heart"	Nominated	
UK Music Video Awards	2009	Best Indie/Alternative Video	"When I Grow Up"	Nominated	

== Discography ==
=== Albums ===
==== Studio albums ====
Title	Details
Fever Ray	Released: 12 January 2009; Label: Rabid; Formats: CD, LP, digital download
Plunge	Released: 27 October 2017; Label: Rabid; Formats: CD, LP, digital download
Radical Romantics	Released: 10 March 2023; Label: Rabid; Formats: CD, LP, digital download

==== Remix albums ====
Title	Details
Plunge Remix	Released: 13 December 2019; Label: Rabid; Format: Digital download, LP, CD
Carbon Dioxide (Remixes)	Released: 20 July 2023; Label: Rabid; Format: Digital download

==== Live albums ====
Title	Details
Live in Luleå	Released: 30 November 2012; Label: Rabid; Format: Digital download
Live at Troxy	Released: 2 August 2019; Label: Rabid; Format: LP, digital download
The Year of the Radical Romantics	Released: 25 July 2025; Label: Rabid; Format: LP, digital download

=== Extended plays ===
Title	Details
Country Creatures (with Björk and the Knife)	Released: 6 September 2019; Label: One Little Indian; Format: LP

=== Singles ===
==== As lead artist ====
Title	Year	Album
"If I Had a Heart"	2008	Fever Ray
"When I Grow Up"	2009	Fever Ray
"Triangle Walks"	2009	Fever Ray
"Seven"	2009	Fever Ray
"Mercy Street"	2010	Non-album single
"To the Moon and Back"	2017	Plunge
"Wanna Sip"	2018	Plunge
"IDK About You"	2018	Plunge
"This Country Makes It Hard to Fuck" (Björk Remix)	2019	Country Creatures and Plunge Remix
"What They Call Us"	2022	Radical Romantics
"Carbon Dioxide"	2022	Radical Romantics
"Kandy"	2023	Radical Romantics
"I’m Not Done (Therapy Session)"	2025	The Year of the Radical Romantics
"Now’s the Only Time I Know (Therapy Session)"	2025	The Year of the Radical Romantics
"The Lake" / "Wrong Flower"	2026	The Bride! (Original Motion Picture Soundtrack)

==== As featured artist ====
Title	Year	Album
"What Else Is There?" (Röyksopp featuring Karin Dreijer)	2005	The Understanding
"This Must Be It" (Röyksopp featuring Karin Dreijer-Andersson)	2009	Junior
"Tricky Tricky" (Röyksopp featuring Karin Dreijer-Andersson)	2009	Junior

=== Guest appearances ===
==== As Karin Dreijer ====
Title	Year	Other artist(s)	Album
"Let It Come Down"	1996	Mazarine Street	The Beast Of...
"Cat"	1996	Mazarine Street	The Beast Of...
"Volksblues"	1998	The Bear Quartet	Personality Crisis
"Wasted"	2000	Robot	Fake or Real?
"Axe Man"	2001	Silverbullit	Citizen Bird
"Lost in the City Nights"	2001	Yvonne	Hit That City
"Slow"	2008	Deus	Vantage Point
"The Jacket" (Karin Knife Remix)	2008	First Floor Power	Non-album single
"No Face"	2012	None	We Are the Works in Progress
"Discourse My New Romance"	2014	Shinedoe	Illogical Directions

==== As Fever Ray ====
Title	Year	Album
"The Wolf"	2011	Red Riding Hood: Original Motion Picture Soundtrack
"The Lake / Wrong Flower"	2026	The Bride! (soundtrack)

=== Music videos ===
Title	Year	Director(s)
"If I Had a Heart"	2009	Andreas Nilsson
"When I Grow Up"	2009	Martin de Thurah
"Triangle Walks"	2009	Mikel Cee Karlsson
"Seven"	2009	Johan Renck
"Stranger Than Kindness"	2009	Andreas Nilsson
"Keep the Streets Empty for Me"	2009	Jens Klevje and Fabian Svensson
"To the Moon and Back"	2017	Martin Falck
"Wanna Sip"	2018	Martin Falck
"IDK About You"	2018	Martin Falck
"What They Call Us"	2022	Martin Falck
"Kandy"	2023	Martin Falck
"Even It Out"	2023	Martin Falck
"What They Call Us (Nifra Remix)"	2023	Martin Falck
"North"	2023	Martin Falck
"Shiver"	2024	Martin Falck
"I’m Not Done (Therapy Session)"	2025	Martin Falck
"Now’s the Only Time I Know (Therapy Session)"	2025	Martin Falck
