= Björn Yttling =

Swedish record producer and songwriter

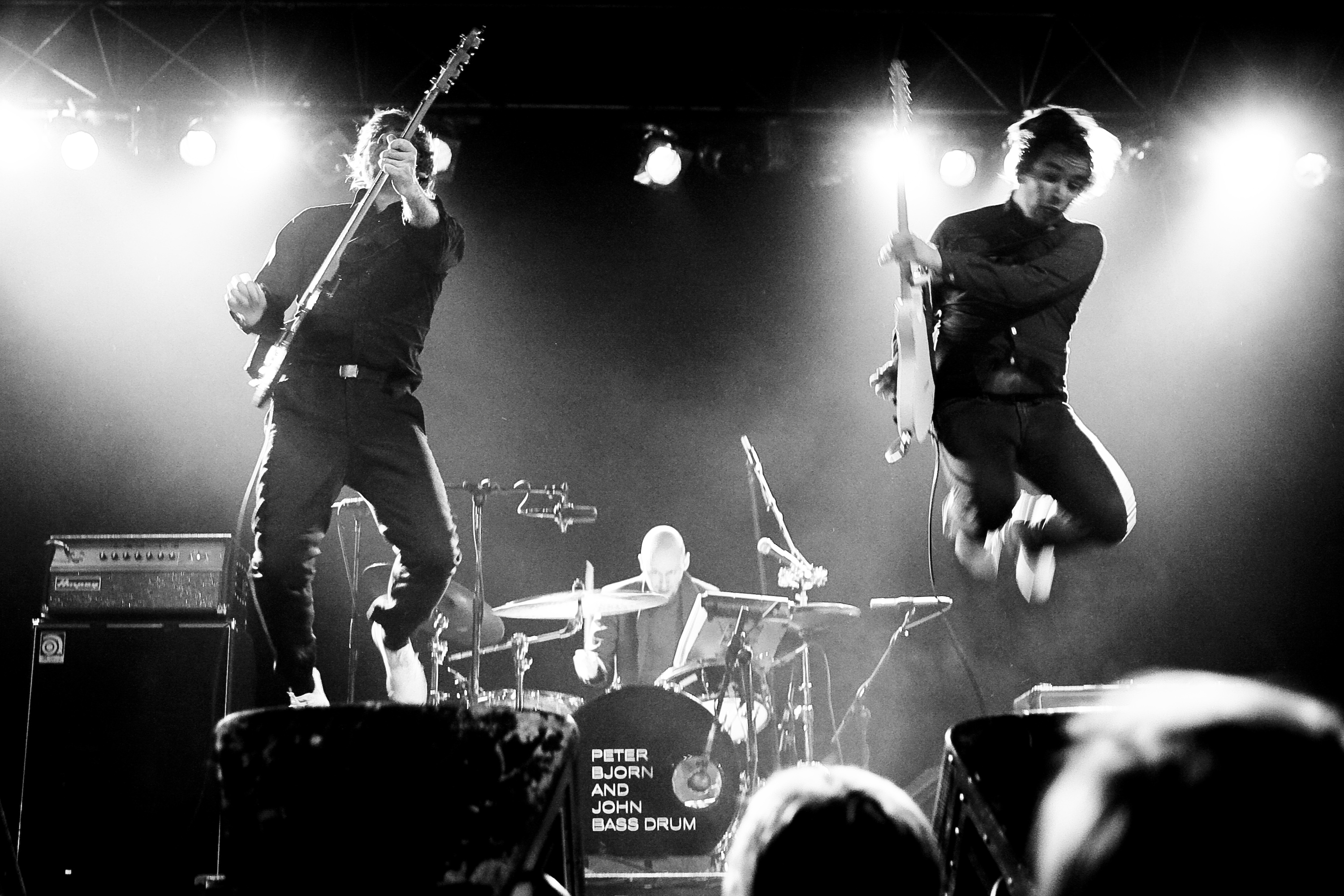
- Yttling (left) performing with Peter Bjorn and John in 2007

Background information
- Born: Björn Daniel Arne Yttling; 16 October 1974 (age 52); Umeå, Sweden
- Origin: Stockholm, Sweden
- Genres: Indie pop, indie rock, jazz
- Occupations: Record producer, songwriter, musician
- Instruments: Piano, keyboards, bass guitar, vocals
- Years active: 1999–present
- Labels: Ingrid, Year0001
- Member of: Peter Bjorn and John, Yttling Jazz, Abstract Crimewave

Björn Daniel Arne Yttling (born 16 October 1974) is a Swedish record producer, songwriter and musician, and a founding member of the indie pop trio Peter Bjorn and John. He co-wrote and produced their breakthrough single "Young Folks" (2006). Outside the band he has produced all but one of Lykke Li's albums and co-wrote her song "I Follow Rivers" (2011), which topped the charts in several European countries. He has also produced albums by Primal Scream and Chrissie Hynde, and parts of albums by Neko Case and Franz Ferdinand.

"Young Folks" and "I Follow Rivers" later brought him writing credits on records by other artists. OneRepublic's "I Ain't Worried" (2022) credits him as a co-writer because its whistled hook resembles "Young Folks". Drake's "Janice STFU" (2026), whose chorus is built on "I Follow Rivers", gave Yttling his first number one as a songwriter on the US Billboard Hot 100.

Yttling is a co-founder of the artist collective and record label Ingrid and jointly runs the recording studio Ingrid Studios in Stockholm. His jazz band Yttling Jazz won the Swedish Grammis award for jazz album of the year in 2026 with Illegal Hit.

== Early life ==
Yttling was born in Umeå and grew up in Måggliden, a village in Norsjö Municipality in northern Sweden. He began writing songs at the age of eight, on a pedal organ. His parents are from Boden, where his father played in the 1960s band Spotlites. He discovered jazz as a child through Jan Johansson records at the local library. As a boy he won a trip to Copenhagen on a television quiz show, took the prize in cash and bought a four-track cassette recorder instead.

After compulsory school he moved to Västerås, west of Stockholm, to attend a music high school, where he met the singer Marit Bergman and his future bandmate Peter Morén. During those years he took private piano lessons for about a year from Esbjörn Svensson, later the leader of the Esbjörn Svensson Trio, whose teaching, according to Yttling, got him into the jazz programme at the folk high school in Skurup in southern Sweden. Pontus Winnberg was a fellow student there, and the two would run a recording studio together many years later.

== Career ==
=== Musician and early productions ===
In 1995 Yttling moved to Stockholm and began playing with Nicolai Dunger, which brought tours across Europe. In the early 2000s he played organ as an additional member of Joakim Åhlund's band Caesars, which had a hit with "Jerk It Out" in 2002. Åhlund later became a close collaborator. At the same time he worked as a session musician for producers such as Jari Haapalainen and gradually took on production work himself. He has described Haapalainen and Pelle Gunnerfeldt as his mentors, and has said that Peter Bjorn and John's debut album was the first record he produced, followed by Marit Bergman's debut. Able to read music, he also wrote string and horn arrangements, among them the strings on the Hives' Tyrannosaurus Hives (2004), produced by Gunnerfeldt, and on the Scottish band Camera Obscura's Let's Get Out of This Country (2006), produced by Haapalainen.

=== Peter Bjorn and John ===
Yttling formed Peter Bjorn and John in 1999 with Peter Morén and John Eriksson. Their breakthrough came with "Young Folks" (2006). Yttling had written the melody on piano for his jazz project but thought it sounded too much like Duke Ellington. On guitar it became a pop song instead. The whistled hook was meant as a placeholder for the melody but was kept after being run through a tape echo. Yttling has said he wrote the song itself quickly during a visit to Boden, but once it was decided to make it a duet the band kept working on the lyrics for several days. According to Yttling, no Swedish label wanted to release the song, which came out on the British label Wichita instead. The album, Writer's Block, was recorded in Yttling's studio in Stockholm. Twenty years later Stereogum described it as one of the best indie rock albums of the 2000s and "Young Folks" as one of the era's defining indie songs.

"Young Folks" became an international hit, reaching number 13 on the UK singles chart. The New York Times named it one of the ten best songs of the decade, and it has since been used by Kanye West, among others. It also opened the pilot episode of Gossip Girl in 2007. Yttling has said the song "kick-started" his career as a producer. Of the fact that artists such as Kanye West, Drake and Kid Cudi discovered the band through the song, he has said that it made them "a kind of dent in the bodywork of popular culture".

The song has since resurfaced in other artists' hits. OneRepublic's "I Ain't Worried", from Top Gun: Maverick (2022), credits Yttling, Morén and Eriksson as co-writers. According to Ryan Tedder, Paramount Pictures required the credit because the song's whistled hook resembled "Young Folks". In 2023 it was the fourth most-played song worldwide among works by Swedish songwriters, according to the Swedish collecting society STIM. The Brazilian singer Jão sampled the song on "O Triste É Que Eu Te Amo" (2024).

=== Production and songwriting ===
Outside his own band, Yttling's first production for an international major label was Shout Out Louds' Our Ill Wills (2007), made for Capitol Records.

==== Primal Scream ====
In 2008 Yttling produced Primal Scream's album Beautiful Future. He returned as co-producer of Chaosmosis (2016), partly recorded in his Stockholm studio. The two have continued to write together: "Holy Commotion", co-written by Yttling and Bobby Gillespie, was recorded by The Pretenders for Alone (2016), and in 2026 Gillespie sang on the Yttling Jazz single "Strange".

==== Lykke Li ====
Yttling's longest collaboration is with Lykke Li. They were introduced in 2005 by a mutual acquaintance at a record label who had heard her demos on Myspace. Yttling has said he started by making her a mixtape of Suicide, Nick Drake and LCD Soundsystem. He has produced all of her albums except So Sad So Sexy (2018): Youth Novels (2008), Wounded Rhymes (2011), I Never Learn (2014), Eyeye (2022) and The Afterparty (2026). He and Lykke Li were the executive producers of The Afterparty, which was recorded with a seventeen-piece string orchestra. The New York Times placed Wounded Rhymes eighth on its list of the best albums of 2011.

The single "I Follow Rivers" was written by Yttling with Lykke Li and the American songwriter Rick Nowels. According to Yttling, he and Lykke Li had thrown the song "in the wastebasket" before Nowels made them start over with it. It went on to top charts in several European countries. In September 2026 a remix by The Magician passed one billion streams on Spotify. In 2026 Drake built the chorus of "Janice STFU" on the song. It reached number one on the Billboard Hot 100 and gave Yttling and Lykke Li their first US number one as songwriters. Lykke Li has called the song "the most mysterious, incredible gift of my career" because it "has had so many lives and versions". Drake had already sampled Lykke Li's Yttling-produced "Little Bit" on his 2009 mixtape So Far Gone, and the German hit "Follow" (2022) by Kontra K, Sido and Leony also samples "I Follow Rivers".

==== Chrissie Hynde ====
In 2014 Yttling produced, with Joakim Åhlund, Chrissie Hynde's first solo album Stockholm, recorded at Ingrid Studios in Stockholm. He also co-wrote songs for the album with Hynde, who has said that they were written very quickly. Neil Young and the tennis player John McEnroe guested on guitar. McEnroe joined after Hynde spotted Yttling's tennis racket in the studio and called him, and besides playing guitar he found time for a game of tennis with the producer. Yttling has said he initially only wanted to write songs with Hynde and declined to produce the album, agreeing on the condition that she got Neil Young to play on it. Young's guitar was recorded in London, where Yttling travelled for the session.

==== Other work ====
Internationally, Yttling has also produced two tracks on Franz Ferdinand's Right Thoughts, Right Words, Right Action (2013). The band's singer Alex Kapranos has said he decided to record with Yttling after the producer summed up their sound as a cross between Dr. Feelgood and Daft Punk. Yttling did additional co-production on Neko Case's Hell-On (2018), recorded in Sweden in the autumn of 2017. Case has said she wanted to hand over some control to him and see what he would make of the songs. Reviewing the album in the Swedish daily Aftonbladet, Markus Larsson called its song "Bad Luck" the logical continuation of "Young Folks". He also produced the Australian singer Sarah Blasko's As Day Follows Night (2009), recorded in Sweden, which won her the ARIA Award for Best Female Artist. He produced most of the Canadian singer Cœur de pirate's Roses (2015), recorded at his studio in Stockholm. He is also one of the songwriters on Celine Dion's album Courage (2019). In Sweden he has worked with Anna Ternheim, Robyn and Gina Dirawi, among others. He co-wrote several songs on First Aid Kit's album Palomino (2022). According to the duo it was the first time they had written with someone outside the band. His songwriting credits also include songs by Kygo and Tom Odell ("Fiction", 2016), Ariel Pink ("Another Weekend", 2017) and Weezer, whose "It's Always Sunny in Bikini Bottom" for The SpongeBob Movie: Sponge on the Run (2021) he wrote with Rivers Cuomo.

=== Own projects ===
With Joakim Åhlund, Yttling formed the duo Smile, which released A Flash in the Night (2012) and Phantom Island (2021), the latter with Robyn as a guest. In 2024 the duo changed its name to Abstract Crimewave, partly to avoid confusion with The Smile, and released The Longest Night with guests including Lykke Li, Chrissie Hynde and Dungen. In 2016 he formed the group Liv with Lykke Li, Miike Snow and the producer Jeff Bhasker, releasing the single "Wings of Love". With Bebban Stenborg of Shout Out Louds and Smash he also formed the trio Astropol, whose debut album The Spin We're In was released on Ingrid in 2015.

Yttling is a co-founder of the artist collective and record label Ingrid, started in 2012 by Lykke Li, Peter Bjorn and John, Miike Snow and Joakim Åhlund of Teddybears among others. Since 2011 he and Pontus Winnberg of Miike Snow and Amason have run the recording studio Ingrid Studios at Bysistorget on Södermalm in Stockholm. The studio, in a former cinema, opened in 1971 as KMH Studios and was for decades one of Sweden's busiest pop and schlager studios, before housing Polar Studios, the studio associated with ABBA, from 2008. The name Ingrid is a tribute to Ingrid Bergman and the building's past as a cinema. In 2021 Yttling and Winnberg started the podcast Back to the Music with Ingrid with the American musician Sarah Snavely.

Under the name Yttling Jazz he released the jazz album Oh Lord, Why Can't I Keep My Big Mouth Shut in 2005. He revived the project twenty years later with Illegal Hit (2025), recorded with jazz musicians including the saxophonist Jonas Kullhammar and the bassist Dan Berglund. The album won the Grammis for jazz album of the year in 2026, and an expanded edition added guest vocalists including Bobby Gillespie and Yukimi Nagano of Little Dragon. In June 2026 the title track was used in a worldwide Apple campaign for AirPods Pro starring the footballer Vinícius Júnior.

== Production style ==
Of his working method, Yttling has said that he prefers acoustic sounds, picks a few instruments and sounds that have to serve the whole album, and would rather let sounds be slightly off than perfect. He has described his productions as fairly similar to one another and said it is fortunate that he works with different singers.

At Ingridstudion the aim, he has said, is for the studio to have its own recognisable sound, "a bit like Kraftwerk's Kling Klang Studio", with a fixed way of miking the drums and the grand piano. Lykke Li has said that Yttling "basically taught me everything I know".

== Personal life ==
Yttling lives in Stockholm and is married. Around 2010 he worked in the United States for five years and lived in New York. He plays tennis and, since the age of 47, ice hockey.

== Selected songwriting credits ==
Songs on which Yttling is credited as a writer or co-writer. Several of the later entries are the result of other artists sampling or reusing the melody of "Young Folks" or "I Follow Rivers".

- 2006 – Peter Bjorn and John – "Young Folks"
- 2007 – Lykke Li – "Little Bit"
- 2009 – Drake and Lykke Li – "Little Bit"
- 2011 – Lykke Li – "I Follow Rivers"
- 2011 – Peter Bjorn and John – "Second Chance"
- 2014 – Lykke Li – "No Rest for the Wicked"
- 2014 – Chrissie Hynde – "Dark Sunglasses"
- 2016 – Kygo and Tom Odell – "Fiction"
- 2017 – Ariel Pink – "Another Weekend"
- 2019 – Celine Dion – "Change My Mind"
- 2020 – Halsey – "Experiment on Me"
- 2021 – Weezer – "It's Always Sunny in Bikini Bottom"
- 2021 – Smile and Robyn – "Call My Name"
- 2022 – First Aid Kit – "Out of My Head"
- 2022 – OneRepublic – "I Ain't Worried"
- 2022 – Kontra K, Sido and Leony – "Follow"
- 2024 – Jão – "O Triste É Que Eu Te Amo"
- 2026 – Drake – "Janice STFU"

== Discography ==
=== Production and songwriting credits ===
Year	Artist	Work	Credit
2001	Nicolai Dunger	A Dress Book	Producer
2001	Nicolai Dunger	Soul Rush	Producer
2002	Caesars Palace	Love For The Streets	Musician
2002	Marit Bergman	3:00 AM Serenades	Producer
2002	Peter Bjorn and John	Peter Bjorn and John	Producer, composer, musician
2003	International Noise Conspiracy	Armed Love	Arranger
2003	Moneybrother	Blood Panic	Producer
2004	Peter Bjorn and John	Falling Out	Producer, composer, musician
2004	The Hives	Tyrannosaurus Hives	String arranger
2004	Shout Out Louds	Oh, Sweetheart (EP)	Producer
2005	Caesars	Paper Tigers	Musician
2005	Moneybrother	To Die Alone	Producer
2005	Yttling Jazz	Oh Lord, Why Can't I Keep My Big Mouth Shut	Producer, writer
2005	Robyn	Be Mine (ballad version)	Producer
2005	Shout Out Louds	Very Loud (EP)	Producer
2005	Shout Out Louds	Howl Howl Gaff Gaff	Producer
2006	Peter Bjorn and John	Writer's Block	Producer, composer, musician
2006	Camera Obscura	Let's Get Out Of This Country	Arranger
2006	Deportees	Damaged Goods	Producer, writer (Missing You Missing Me)
2006	Montys Loco	Man Overboard (Montys Loco album)	Producer
2006	Robyn	Rakamonie EP	Producer
2006	Concretes	On the Radio (Concretes album)	Producer
2007	Sahara Hotnights	What If Leaving is a Loving Thing	Producer
2007	Shout Out Louds	Our Ill Wills	Producer
2007	Eldkvarn	Svart blogg	Arranger
2007	Davenport (band)	Slow Town	Arranger
2007	Nicolai Dunger	Rösten och Herren	Producer
2007	Taken By Trees	Open Field	Producer, writer
2007	Taxi! Taxi!	EP (Taxi, Taxi! album)	Producer
2007	Robyn	Handle Me (Bjorn remix)	Producer
2007	The Shins	Australia (PBJ remix)	Producer
2008	Peter Bjorn and John	Seaside Rock	Producer, composer, musician
2008	Lykke Li	Youth Novels	Producer, composer, musician
2008	Anna Ternheim	Leaving On a Mayday	Producer
2008	Primal Scream	Beautiful Future	Producer ("Can't Go Back")
2008	Caesars	Strawberry Weed	Musician
2008	Madrugada	Madrugada	Arranger
2009	Moneybrother	Real Control	Producer, writer
2009	Sarah Blasko	As Day Follows Night	Producer
2009	Camera Obscura	My Maudlin Career	Producer
2009	Peter Bjorn and John	Living Thing	Artist, producer, writer, musician
2009	Sahara Hotnights	Sparks	Producer
2010	Example	Won't Go Quietly	Writer
2010	The Suzan	Golden Week for the Poco Poco Beat	Producer, writer
2010	Natasha Bedingfield	Strip Me	Arranger (Little Too Much, Run Run Run)
2011	Firefox AK	Color the Trees	Producer, writer
2011	Lisa Miskovsky	Violent Sky	Producer, writer
2011	Peter Bjorn and John	Gimme Some	Artist, producer, writer, musician
2011	Lykke Li	Wounded Rhymes	Producer, writer, musician
2012	A Nighthawk	Until I Faltered I Wasn't Free	Producer
2012	Alex Winston	King Con	Producer, writer
2012	Brandy	Two Eleven	Writer (Let Me Go)
2012	Lissy Truille	Lissy Truille	Writer
2012	Smile	A Flash in the Night	Producer, writer, musician
2012	Amanda Jenssen	Hymns For the Haunted	Producer, writer
2013	Johnossi	Transitions	Executive producer
2013	Sibille Attar	Come Night (song)	Producer, writer
2013	Zacharias Blad	Zacharias Blad	Producer, writer
2013	David Lynch	We Rolled Together (Yttling Jazz Remix)	Producer
2013	Franz Ferdinand	Right Thoughts, Right Words, Right Action	Producer (Treason! Animals.), co-producer (The Universe Expanded)
2014	Lykke Li	I Never Learn	Producer, writer, musician
2014	Chrissie Hynde	Stockholm	Producer, writer, musician
2014	Benjamin Clementine	Condolence (Yttling Jazz Remix)	Producer
2014	The Fault in Our Stars (soundtrack)	The Fault in Our Stars (soundtrack)	Producer, writer "No One Ever Loved" by Lykke Li
2015	Cœur de pirate	Roses	Producer
2015	Astropol	The Spin We're In	Producer, musician, artist
2016	Albin Lee Meldau	Lou Lou	Producer
2016	The Pretenders	Alone	Writer
2016	liv	"Wings of Love"	Writer, producer, artist
2016	liv	"Dream Awake"	Writer, producer, artist
2016	Primal Scream	Chaosmosis	Producer, writer ("Trippin' on Your Love", "(Feeling Like A) Demon Again", "Private Wars", "Where the Light Gets in", "Carnival of Fools", "Autumn in Paradise")
2016	Kygo	Cloud Nine	Writer ("Fiction" (featuring Tom Odell))
2016	Peter Bjorn and John	Breakin' Point	Artist, producer, writer, musician
2017	liv	"Heaven"	Writer, producer, artist
2017	Ariel Pink	Dedicated to Bobby Jameson	Writer ("Another Weekend")
2017	Tove Styrke	Say My Name	Producer ("Say My Name" acoustic version)
2017	liv	"Hurts to liv"	Writer, producer, artist
2017	Magnus Lindgren	Stockholm Underground	Writer
2017	Thomas Stenström	Rör Inte Min Kompis	Writer, producer
2018	Neko Case	Hell-On	Producer, musician
2018	Elias	No Deeper Can We Fall	Writer
2018	Joe Janiak	Heaven Knows (Joe Janiak album)	Writer
2018	Peter Bjorn and John	Darker Days	Artist, producer, writer, musician
2019	Peter Bjorn and John	EPBJ	Artist, producer, writer, musician
2019	Anna Ternheim	A Space For Lost Time	writer
2019	Freja the Dragon	Tell Me I'm Wrong	Producer, writer
2019	Taken by Trees	Careless Whisper (remix)	Producer
2019	Celine Dion	Courage	Writer ("Change My Mind")
2020	Halsey	Birds of Prey: The Album	Writer ("Experiment on Me")
2020	Peter Bjorn and John	Endless Dream	Artist, producer, writer, musician
2020	Peter Bjorn and John	Endless Play (EP)	Artist, writer ("Gone Gone Gone"), musician
2021	Smile	Phantom Island	Producer, writer, musician
2021	Weezer	The SpongeBob Movie: Sponge on the Run	Writer ("It's Always Sunny in Bikini Bottom")
2022	Lykke Li	Eyeye	Producer
2022	First Aid Kit	Palomino	Writer ("Out of My Head")
2022	OneRepublic	"I Ain't Worried"	Writer
2024	Abstract Crimewave	The Longest Night	Producer, writer, musician
2025	Yttling Jazz	Illegal Hit	Producer, writer
2026	Lykke Li	The Afterparty	Executive producer, producer
2026	Drake	Iceman	Writer ("Janice STFU")

== Awards and nominations ==
Year	Award	Category	Nominated work	Result	Ref.
2007	MTV Video Music Awards	Best New Artist	"Young Folks" (with Peter Bjorn and John)	Nominated	
2007	Shortlist Music Prize	Album of the year	Writer's Block (with Peter Bjorn and John)	Nominated	
2008	Grammis	Producer of the Year	Writer's Block and Sahara Hotnights' What If Leaving Is a Loving Thing	Nominated	
2008	Musikförläggarnas pris	Composer of the Year	—	Nominated	
2009	Grammis	Producer of the Year	Youth Novels and Anna Ternheim's Leaving on a Mayday	Nominated	
2011	Musikförläggarnas pris	Song of the Year and International Success of the Year	"Get Some" (with Lykke Li)	Nominated	
2012	Grammis	Composer of the Year	Wounded Rhymes (with Lykke Li and Rick Nowels)	Nominated	
2013	BMI Film & TV Awards	Television music	"Second Chance", theme song of 2 Broke Girls (with Peter Bjorn and John)	Won	
2014	Musikförläggarnas pris	Composer of the Year	With Lykke Li	Nominated	
2026	Grammis	Jazz Album of the Year	Illegal Hit (as Yttling Jazz)	Won	
