= Breakin' Point (song) =

Single by Peter Bjorn and John

from the album Breakin' Point
- B-side: "Bad Taste"
- Released: 25 March 2016
- Studio: Ingrid Studios (Stockholm, Sweden)
- Genre: Pop
- Length: 3:29
- Label: PBJ Musik; Ingrid
- Songwriters: Peter Morén; Björn Yttling; John Eriksson
- Producers: Emile Haynie; Peter Bjorn and John (add.)

Peter Bjorn and John singles chronology
"What You Talking About?" (2016)	"Breakin' Point" (2016)	"Dominos" (2016)

"Breakin' Point" is a song by Swedish band Peter Bjorn and John from their seventh studio album Breakin' Point (2016). It was released on 25 March 2016 through PBJ Musik and Ingrid as the album's second single. Written by the band and produced by Emile Haynie, "Breakin' Point" is a midtempo pop song with lyrics alluding to the protagonist's concerns about expecting a child. It features a whistling intro, which the band were initially hesitant to include as their breakthrough single "Young Folks" (2006) had a similar composition. They eventually decided "Breakin' Point" would represent a fitting tribute as it was conceived near the ten-year anniversary of "Young Folks".

Music critics were generally positive towards "Breakin' Point" and noted its catchiness. Commercially, the single only appeared below the top 50 of the Wallonian Ultratip chart. A remix by Swedish band Miike Snow was also released. The song's accompanying music video was shot in Poland on several locations, including Wolin National Park. It was directed by Danish-Norwegian duo HochR, who took inspiration from the rivers of Hades in the underworld from Greek mythology, particularly the river Styx.

== Background and production ==
"Breakin' Point" was written by Peter Bjorn and John's three members, Peter Morén, Björn Yttling and John Eriksson as the title track for their seventh studio album Breakin' Point (2016). The band began writing the album four years prior, following a year-long break after touring for their previous album Gimme Some (2011). Initial sessions with Patrik Berger aimed to create a "classic" and guitar-focused sound, but the band soon changed their approach to make "the best possible pop songs". Yttling felt an "Emile Haynie beat" would fit the song and reached out to the producer, who was visiting Stockholm at the time and agreed to work with them. Haynie produced "Breakin' Point" and provided additional instrumentation, along with synthesizer. The band handled additional production and played the core instruments of the track. Yttling and Eriksson also provided programming in addition to playing live instruments. Lasse Mårtén mixed "Breakin' Point" and Henrik Jonsson mastered the recording at Masters of Audio in Stockholm.

The integration of whistling on the track was initially unintentional. Morén whistled the tune while recording the song at Ingrid Studios in Stockholm, and the recording ended up being kept for the final version. Morén explained they were originally reluctant to include the whistles as they felt it might be viewed as "so obvious" considering their breakthrough single "Young Folks" from Writer's Block (2006) was heavily built upon whistling. As "Breakin' Point" was conceived near the ten-year anniversary of Writer's Block, Morén described the whistling aspects as a "nice tribute" to "Young Folks". The band preferred a tribute record over issuing a "big deluxe" re-release of Writer's Block or an anniversary tour. An "early version" of the song, sans the whistles and solely produced by the band, is included on the deluxe edition of the album.

== Composition and lyrics ==
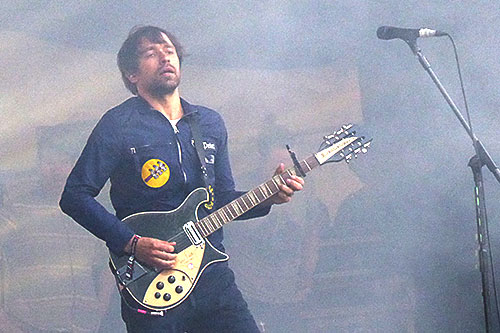
Peter Morén explained that "Breakin' Point" was inspired by his concerns about expecting a child.

"Breakin' Point" is a midtempo pop song. It features instrumentation provided by drums, an electric bass, a guitar, percussion, a piano, a synthesizer, and a zither. The song begins with siren-like whistles and a high-pitched piano. Rose Kerr of Spectrum Culture observed the song's "darker" beat in contrast to its whimsy provided by whistles and a "backing youth chorus". Gregory Adams of Exclaim! interpreted the whistling melody as "slightly sorrowful", and Bill Pearis of BrooklynVegan called the record a "melancholic anthem". Adams suggested the lyrics speak of "pondering life on the couch", manifested in the line "What to do, what to say" sung in the verse. Clash's Will Butler viewed the lyric "Got it from whisky like any loser can" as Morén "tacitly" evoking a "part-Hunter S. Thompson, part-Brian Wilson persona".

Regarding its lyrical theme, Morén told Stereogum it has several meanings, "It's about waiting for new things coming ahead that will leave the past in the dust or at least make it look very different. About mental and physical adjustment. About kids becoming parents and maybe about growing up. About perspective, balance and seeing things for what they might actually be and not blown up to grotesque proportions." While the album's title refers to a breaking point where the band felt they might not finish the album and break up instead, Morén explained to Esquire that the breaking point in the title track alludes to becoming a parent. He said, "You feel directionless, you're burned out on life, and wondering what this kid will do to me—fuck me up more or enlighten me?" Regarding the lyrical connection between the song and "Young Folks", he called its story of expecting a child a "quite deliberate perspective from meeting a new lover at a bar, which is what 'Young Folks' was about".

== Release and reception ==
"Breakin' Point" was selected as the second single after "What You Talking About?" to precede the album's release on 10 June 2016. The song premiered on 24 March 2016 on Zane Lowe's radio show on Apple Music's station Beats 1, and had its online premiere on Stereogum the same day. In conjunction with its release, Morén stated that it "features great production from Emile Haynie and ... we're very proud of it!" Jonas Torvestig designed the single artwork depicting a disembodied white-glove hand. The band previously worked with the artist for the artwork of Gimme Some. "Breakin' Point" was made available for digital download and streaming on 25 March 2016 through PBJ Musik and Ingrid. A remix produced by Swedish band Miike Snow was released on 22 April 2016. Both bands utilize Ingrid Studios in Stockholm, and Yttling told Consequence of Sound that "it was exciting to hear [Miike Snow's] take on our song". Their label, Ingrid, issued a 7-inch vinyl on 13 May 2016, containing "Breakin' Point" and the previously unreleased B-side "Bad Taste". Morén revealed the same month that the B-side would be digitally released in the future. It was eventually included on the deluxe edition of Breakin' Point, released on 3 March 2017.

"Breakin' Point" received generally positive reviews from music critics. Michelle Geslani of Consequence of Sound hailed it as a "lovely number uplifted by a harmonious mix of sweet whistling, reverberating drums, and a swelling chorus". Drowned in Sound's Kellan Miller wrote that the song "manages to distinguish itself as its own unique, borderline magnetic offspring", despite exhibiting similar "contagious" whistling as "Young Folks". Colin Fitsgerald of PopMatters viewed it as "sparse but catchy". Similarly, Ian Hays, writing for The 405, noted its catchiness and deemed it a standout on the album. In a negative review, Tim Sendra of AllMusic felt the whistling is a "sad reminder" of "Young Folks", and regarded it a low point on the album. Commercially, "Breakin' Point" did not enter any charts, but appeared below the top 50 of the Wallonian Ultratip chart as an "extra tip" on the week of 11 June 2016. The song remained there for four weeks.

== Music video ==
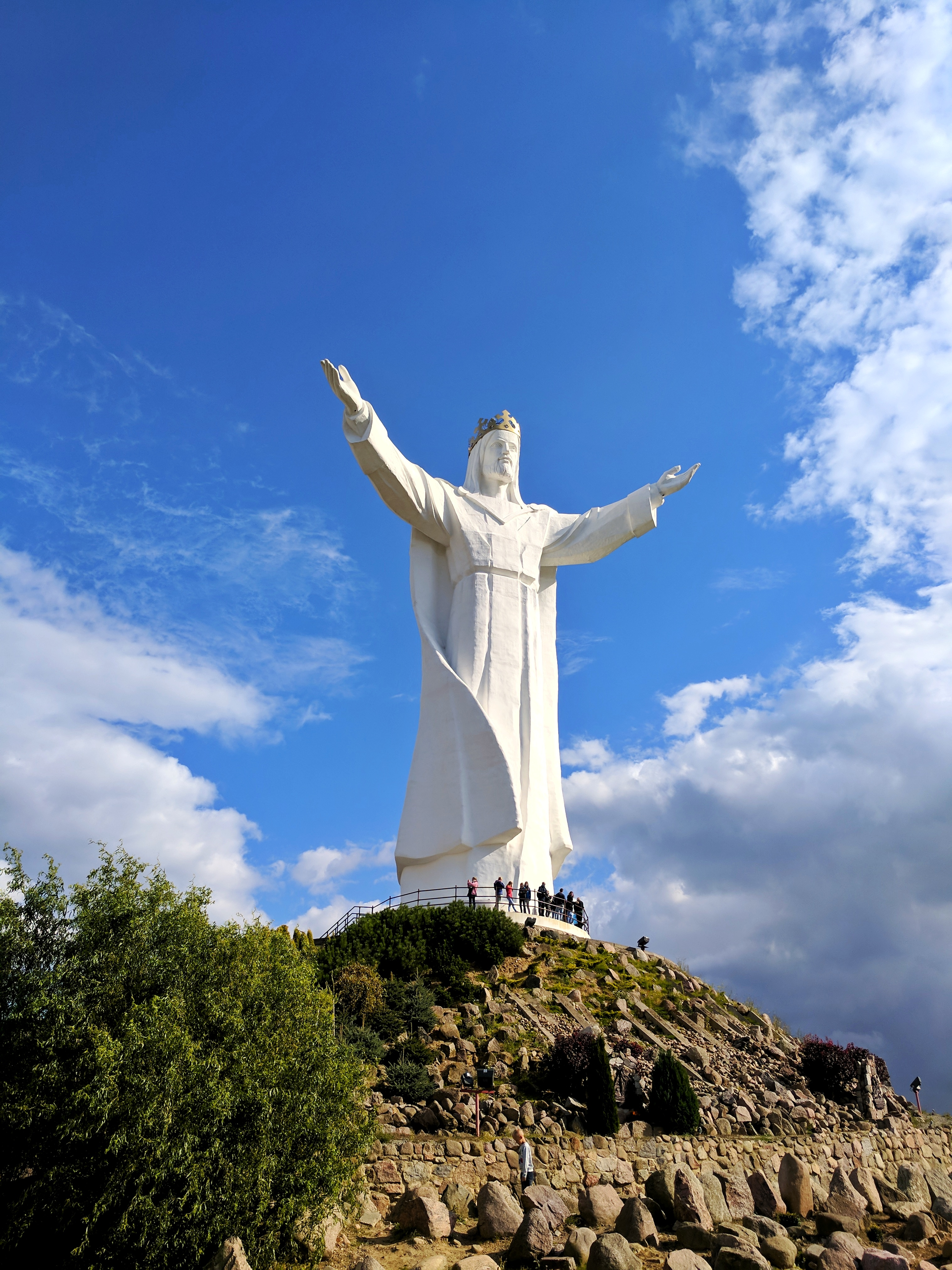
The Christ the King statue in Świebodzin appears in the video.

Danish-Norwegian duo HochR (Howlid and Rosenbak) directed the accompanying music video for "Breakin' Point". The directors created a treatment based on the rivers that surround Hades in the underworld in Greek mythology, particularly the river Styx. HochR wanted to capture a modern take on Hades and avoided a "typical dark, burning underworld", instead opting for a "seemingly fairytale forest" and "sunny sand dunes". The video was shot on location in Poland over three days. The desert scenes were shot in Wolin National Park and additional scenes nearby a river outside of Warsaw. The Christ the King statue in Świebodzin, Poland appears in the video. The visual premiered on 14 June 2016 on Noisey. The lead role in the video is portrayed by Grzegorz Kowalczyk. The video commences as the protagonist wakes up in the backseat of a car. He exits and the car drives off. He meets a ferryman by the river of Styx and boards a ferry, taking him to a forest where he is accompanied by his "inner fable animal", a creature with long fur resembling yarn strings on a mop. He then meets two other men by a Jesus statue. While the protagonist is sleeping in the forest, the creature begins to drag him out of the forest and into a desert. The man wakes up while being dragged through the desert, and the creature lets him go when after he hits it with sticks. The man climbs a hill where he meets the creature again. He stands by it while overlooking the desert landscape, where other humans roam accompanied by their fable animals. Tom Breihan, writing for Stereogum, named the visual the fifth best music video of the week of its release, asserting "The final reveal here is a good one, and it makes me wish I had my own mop creature."

== Formats and track listing ==
- 7-inch
1. "Breakin' Point" – 3:29
2. "Bad Taste" – 2:52
- Digital download
1. "Breakin' Point" – 3:29
- Digital download (remix)
1. "Breakin' Point" (Miike Snow remix) – 4:00

== Credits and personnel ==
Credits are adapted from the liner notes of Breakin' Point.

- Peter Morén – lead vocals, backing vocals, acoustic guitar, whistle
- Björn Yttling – backing vocals, electric bass, acoustic guitar, percussion, programming
- John Eriksson – drums, percussion, piano, zither, programming
- Emile Haynie – production, additional instrumentation, synthesizer
- Peter Bjorn and John – additional production
- Lasse Mårtén – mixing
- Henrik Jonsson – mastering

== Release history ==
Country	Date	Format	Label	Ref.
Various countries	25 March 2016	Digital download	PBJ Musik; Ingrid	
Various countries	22 April 2016	Digital download (Miike Snow remix)	PBJ Musik; Ingrid	
Various countries	13 May 2016	7-inch	PBJ Musik; Ingrid	
