= Wings of Love (Liv song) =

Single by Liv
- Released: 30 September 2016
- Genre: Folk rock
- Length: 4:06
- Label: Ingrid
- Songwriters: Lykke Li; Andrew Wyatt; Pontus Winnberg; Björn Yttling; Jeff Bhasker
- Producer: Liv

Liv singles chronology
"Wings of Love" (2016)	"Dream Awake" (2016)

"Wings of Love" is the debut single by Swedish supergroup Liv. It was released on 30 September 2016. The music video for "Wings of Love" was shot on 3 July 2016 and directed by Lykke Li. On 1 July, Li asked people to participate in the video by being naked. On 4 November 2016, an alternate "tantra" version of the song was released, featuring Punjabi singer Jasbir Jassi.
