= It Don't Move Me =

Single by Peter Bjorn and John

from the album Living Thing
- B-side: "Nothing to Worry About" (Jocko For Teddybears remix)
- Released: 2009
- Genre: Indie pop, synthpop
- Length: 3:21 (Album version)
- Label: Wichita
- Songwriter(s): Peter Morén, Björn Yttling, John Eriksson
- Producer(s): Björn Yttling

Peter Bjorn and John singles chronology
"Lay It Down" (2009)	"It Don't Move Me" (2009)	"Second Chance" (2011)

"It Don't Move Me" is a song by Swedish rock band Peter Bjorn and John, released as the third single from their fifth studio album Living Thing. It was written and composed by group members Peter Morén, Björn Yttling, and John Eriksson, and produced by the latter of the three. The song, like much of the album, is influenced by synthpop, featuring common synthpop elements such as electronically tweaked drums and synthesizers.

The song, described by music review site Pitchfork Media as "a diatribe against sentimentalism ostensibly directed at an ex-lover," failed to gain significant chart success, and received mixed reviews from critics, with Pitchfork also noting that it "plays like a virtual rewrite of "Young Folks"...but with the bongos and whistles relinquished in favor of a hand-clapped electro-funk backing track and deep piano tones."

== Music video ==
The song's music video was directed by Filip Nilsson. Its main plot revolves around a man, reminiscent of American entertainer Michael Jackson, dancing for an older man in various locations such as the latter man's home, a dance studio, and a golf course. The former man's dance moves are also reminiscent of Jackson's own moves from his music video Thriller.

The video was the center of a segment of the fourth season finale of Canadian television series Video on Trial, which critiques videos using a courtroom-like format. Peter Bjorn and John were ultimately given a fictitious sentence of "[letting] MJ rest in peace" and instead "start stealing Britney Spears' moves for their next video."

== Track listing ==
=== CD-R single ===
1. "It Don't Move Me" (Album version) - 3:21
2. "It Don't Move Me" (PBJ vs. Miike Snow remix) - 4:45
3. "It Don't Move Me" (Weird Tapes remix) - 3:58
4. "Nothing to Worry About" (Jocko For Teddybears remix) - 5:16
