= Endless Dream (album) =

Studio album by Peter Bjorn and John
- Released: 13 March 2020
- Length: 37:20
- Label: Ingrid

Peter Bjorn and John chronology
Darker Days (2018)	Endless Dream (2020)

Singles from Endless Dream
- 1. "Rusty Nail" Released: 18 October 2019; 2. "Reason to Be Reasonable" Released: 15 November 2019; 3. "Idiosyncrasy" Released: 13 December 2019; 4. "On The Brink" Released: 10 January 2020; 5. "Drama King" Released: 31 January 2020; 6. "Music" Released: 21 February 2020

LP rear cover
- "Board game" rear cover used on the vinyl release

Endless Dream is the ninth album by Peter Bjorn and John. It was released on 13 March 2020 on the Ingrid label of which the band are co-founders.

== Background ==
The band's previous album Darker Days came shortly after the protracted and highly collaborative production of Breakin' Point and saw the band revert to a more in-house approach. Re-emboldened by the comparatively quick turnaround of Darker Days, further writing and recording took place almost immediately, with the brighter tone and lyrical content of the resulting music both reflecting the band's mood and acting as a counterpoint to the mood of Darker Days and its companion digital EP EPBJ. The album was preceded by six tracks released as singles in succession, each accompanied by its own music video which join up into a larger video presentation reminiscent of the whole-album music video for 2011's Gimme Some. The album was released on vinyl LP and digital, but there is no CD release planned due to declining sales of the format.

== Design ==
The front cover artwork, depicting the band members looking up at three peaks of a mountain range, follows the consistent motif of having the three band members or three similar objects on each of their album covers. The cover was designed by Frans Enmark and illustrated by Graham Samuels, who had previously illustrated the artwork of their third album Writer's Block. The rear cover artwork for the LP is a functional board-game board illustrated in the same style featuring the tracklisting embedded into the path of the board game.

== Track listing ==
All songs written by Peter Morén, Björn Yttling and John Eriksson.

1. "Music" – 3:20
2. "Reason to Be Reasonable" – 3:50
3. "Drama King" – 3:46
4. "Rusty Nail" – 3:03
5. "Endless Reruns" – 3:31
6. "Idiosyncrasy" – 2:48
7. "Out of Nowhere" – 4:02
8. "Simple Song of Sin" – 5:09
9. "A Week-End" – 3:39
10. "On the Brink" – 4:12
