= Stockholm (Chrissie Hynde album) =

Studio album by Chrissie Hynde
- Released: June 10, 2014
- Studio: Ingrid (Stockholm)
- Genre: Power pop
- Length: 37:50
- Labels: Will Travel; Caroline
- Producers: Björn Yttling; Joakim Åhlund

Chrissie Hynde chronology
| Stockholm (2014) | Valve Bone Woe (2019) |

Singles from Stockholm
- 1. "Dark Sunglasses" Released: April 1, 2014; 2. "You or No One" Released: May 7, 2014; 3. "Down the Wrong Way" Released: September 15, 2014

Stockholm is the debut solo studio album by American singer-songwriter Chrissie Hynde, lead singer of the Pretenders. It was released on June 10, 2014, by Will Travel and Caroline Records. It features guest appearances from Canadian musician Neil Young and former tennis player John McEnroe.

== Background and production ==
In a news release, Hynde stressed that she did not regard Stockholm as a solo record, explaining that although it was the first album released under her own name, it was "not a solo album" and was, in fact, "more of a collaboration" than any Pretenders release. She expanded on this idea in an interview with The Observer, reflecting that she had insisted for "35 years" that she would "never go solo", but suggested that, over time, the things one never intended to do can become the only unexplored options left, ultimately making them seem "pretty interesting".

Stockholm is mainly rooted in power pop, which sounds like "ABBA meets John Lennon". It features guest appearances from the Pretenders members, Neil Young and John McEnroe, and was recorded with Björn Yttling at Ingrid Studios located in Stockholm.

== Promotion ==
Stockholm spawned overall three singles; "Dark Sunglasses", "You or No One", and "Down the Wrong Way". The lead single, "Dark Sunglasses", was released on April 1, 2014, along with the announcement of Stockholm. Hynde also released a limited 7-inch edition of the song with "Torniquet (Cynthia Ann)" on April 19, for Record Store Day. On May 7, "You or No One" served as the second single from the album. "Down the Wrong Way" was chosen as the final single from the album, released on September 15.

== Critical reception ==
Professional ratings
Aggregate scores
| Source | Rating |
|---|---|
| Metacritic | 64/100 |
Review scores
| Source | Rating |
| AllMusic | 3.5/5 stars |
| Consequence | C |
| The Guardian | 3/5 stars |
| MusicOMH | 3/5 stars |
| NME | 3/5 stars |
| The Observer | 3/5 stars |
| Paste | 8.5/10 |
| Pitchfork | 5.8/10 |
| PopMatters | 5/10 |
| Rolling Stone | 3.5/5 stars |

Stockholm received mixed to positive reviews. According to the review aggregator Metacritic, Stockholm received "generally favorable reviews" based on a weighted average score of 64 out of 100 from 18 critic scores.

Critics frequently remarked on the album's inconsistency; they described it as uneven despite containing notable highlights. AllMusic characterized Stockholm as "a little inconsistent", suggesting that it occasionally "sag[s] on ballads" or "drag[s] its feet at mid-tempos" even as it acknowledged "several strong additions to her canon" and an overall feel that was "fresher than expected". Pitchfork echoed this ambivalence, arguing that the material might have landed with greater impact had it been more concise, and described the finished album as "a rather wan listen". PopMatters similarly concluded that "very little on Stockholm stands out", despite the evident effort of those involved.

A recurring theme among reviewers was the tension between Hynde's trademark edge and the album's sophisticated execution. The Guardian observed that "not all the tracks hit the spot", and added that, some of Hynde's sharpness had been "dulled by studio sheen", though it noted that the album was "bookended by two songs from her top drawer". Andy Gill of The Independent was more pointed, arguing, the album's main shortcoming lay in "the lack of distinction of the material", with excitement surfacing only briefly when Neil Young's guitar disrupted the calm of "Down the Wrong Way". The Boston Globe offered one of the harshest assessments, asserting that Hynde's "rock credibility [...] is in tatters after some of the mediocre material here".

Several critics focused on the collaborative nature of the project, particularly the influence of Björn Yttling on its sound. Rolling Stone framed the album as "actually a joint effort", noting that Hynde "does decompress" musically while still retaining the ability to "flash her blade", and likening "In a Miracle" to "Aimee Mann after a warm bath". The Observer credited Yttling with bringing "some extra zip to the mid-tempo power pop", but maintained that the results ultimately left the listener "wishing for something a little more revealing and bold". Paste struck a more ambivalent note, writing that Stockholm retains "the cutting lyrical tilt and raw agony that defined the Pretender", while it added that its polished surface "beckons listeners", suggesting a tension between emotional bite and studio sheen. Consequence likewise summarized the album's mixed reception by noting that, at its best, Stockholm was "solid and grounded", but at its weakest drifted toward being "a tad 'Middle of the Road'".

Despite widespread reservations, a number of reviewers welcomed the album as a modest but respectable addition to Hynde's body of work. MusicOMH acknowledged that the album "doesn't have the timeless quality of her classic material", yet concluded, "it's good to have her back nonetheless". NME suggested that "you'll fall for these tunes with repeated exposure", even if listeners might live without them once you're free from them too".

== Track listing ==
All tracks are written by Chrissie Hynde and Björn Yttling, except "Like in the Movies" and "Adding the Blue" by Hynde and Joakim Åhlund.

Stockholm track listing
| No. | Title | Length |
|---|---|---|
| 1. | "You or No One" | 3:40 |
| 2. | "Dark Sunglasses" | 3:05 |
| 3. | "Like in the Movies" | 3:16 |
| 4. | "Down the Wrong Way" | 3:37 |
| 5. | "You're the One" | 2:50 |
| 6. | "A Plan Too Far" | 3:13 |
| 7. | "In a Miracle" | 3:59 |
| 8. | "House of Cards" | 3:51 |
| 9. | "Tourniquet (Cynthia Ann)" | 2:41 |
| 10. | "Sweet Nuthin'" | 3:00 |
| 11. | "Adding the Blue" | 4:38 |

== Personnel ==
Credits were adapted from the liner notes.

Musicians

- Chrissie Hynde – vocals
- Björn Yttling – electric bass, acoustic guitar, piano, synthesizer, electric guitar, organ, percussion, Mellotron, celeste
- Joakim Åhlund – guitar, backing vocals
- John Eriksson – drums, percussion
- Niklas Gabrielsson – drums
- Nino Keller – drums, backing vocals
- Ulf Engström – bass, backing vocals
- Mattias Boström – electric guitar
- Neil Young – electric guitar (track 4)
- John McEnroe – electric guitar
- Andreas Pettersson – steel guitar
- Petter Axelsson – viola
- Andreas Forsman – violin
- Conny Lindgren – violin
- Leo Svensson Sander – cello, saw
- Zacharias Blad – backing vocals (track 2)

Technical

- Björn Yttling – producer (tracks 1, 2, 4–10)
- Joakim Åhlund – producer (tracks 3, 11)
- Gustav Lindelöw – engineer (tracks 1–11)
- Hans Stenlund – engineer (tracks 1, 2, 4–10)
- Nille Perned – engineer (tracks 1, 2, 4–10)
- Andy Wright – engineer (track 4)
- Gavin Goldberg – engineer (track 4)
- Lasse Mårtén – mixing
- Henrik Jonsson – mastering
- Peacock – art direction, design
- Dean Chalkley – photography
- Ruth Rowland – lettering
- Thomas Kurmeier – Stockholm image

== Charts ==
| Chart (2014) | Peak position |
|---|---|
| Australian Hitseekers Albums (ARIA) | 3 |
| Belgian Albums (Ultratop Flanders) | 51 |
| Belgian Albums (Ultratop Wallonia) | 56 |
| Croatian International Albums (HDU) | 20 |
| French Albums (SNEP) | 120 |
| German Albums (Offizielle Top 100) | 83 |
| Scottish Albums (Official Charts) | 21 |
| Swedish Albums (Sverigetopplistan) | 43 |
| Swiss Albums (Schweizer Hitparade) | 73 |
| UK Albums (Official Charts) | 22 |
| US Billboard 200 | 36 |
| US Independent Albums (Billboard) | 8 |
| US Indie Store Album Sales (Billboard) | 7 |
| US Top Rock Albums (Billboard) | 14 |
