= Liv (band) =

Swedish/American supergroup

- Origin: Sweden, United States
- Genre: Indie pop
- Years active: 2016–present
- Label: Ingrid
- Members: Lykke Li; Andrew Wyatt; Pontus Winnberg; Björn Yttling; Jeff Bhasker

Liv, stylized as liv, is a Swedish/American supergroup consisting of musicians Lykke Li, Andrew Wyatt and Pontus Winnberg of Miike Snow, Björn Yttling of Peter Bjorn and John, and Jeff Bhasker, formed in 2016. Liv is the Swedish word for "life". Lykke Li has described the band as "the love child of ABBA and Fleetwood Mac." All band members are part of the Swedish artist collective Ingrid, which they spearheaded in 2012.

Liv made their first appearance in April 2016 at a private party in Los Angeles. Their second appearance was at the Spotify Symposium conference in Stockholm, Sweden, on 10 June 2016.

The band's debut single, "Wings of Love", was released on 30 September 2016. A music video for the song was uploaded to YouTube on 12 October 2016. The band released a second song, "Dream Awake", on 11 November 2016. On 9 June 2017, they released a third single, "Heaven". On 22 September 2017, they issued the single "Hurts to Liv".

== Discography ==
Singles

- "Wings of Love" (2016)
- "Dream Awake" (2016)
- "Heaven" (2017)
- "Hurts to Liv" (2017)
