= Ingrid Studios =

Recording studio in Stockholm, Sweden

Coordinates: 59°19′6″N 18°3′21″E

- The main recording room in 2019
- Formerly: KMH Studios
- Type: Recording studio
- Industry: Music
- Founded: 1971; 55 years ago
- Founder: Lasse Holm, Lennart Karlsmyr and Leif Malmborg
- Headquarters: Bysistorget 6, Södermalm, Stockholm, Sweden
- Owner: Björn Yttling and Pontus Winnberg
- Website: www.ingridstudios.com

Ingrid Studios (Swedish: Ingridstudion), formerly KMH Studios, is a recording studio at Bysistorget in the Södermalm district of Stockholm, Sweden. It was established in 1971 in a former cinema by Lasse Holm, Lennart Karlsmyr and Leif Malmborg. Since 2011 it has been owned by the record producers Björn Yttling of Peter Bjorn and John and Pontus Winnberg of Miike Snow, who renamed it after the actress Ingrid Bergman, and it is the base of the artist collective and record label Ingrid.

As KMH Studios it was used mainly for Swedish dansband recordings. ABBA recorded three tracks for their debut album Ring Ring there. From 2008 the premises housed Polar Studios, which had left its original location in 2004. Artists who have recorded at the studio since 2011 include Chrissie Hynde, Primal Scream, Franz Ferdinand and Lykke Li. Much of the 1970s interior is preserved, and the Stockholm City Museum documented the studio in 2019.

== History ==
=== KMH Studios (1971–2008) ===
Hornsgatan at present-day Bysistorget in the 1930s. The sign of the Rixi cinema is visible on the building on the right.

The premises housed a cinema called Rixi from 1933. In 1971 Lasse Holm, Lennart Karlsmyr and Leif Malmborg, who already ran a studio in a Stockholm suburb, converted the cinema into a recording studio and named it KMH after the initials of their surnames. Much of the building work was done by hand, and Karlsmyr built the studio's first mixing desks himself.

ABBA recorded three tracks for their first album, Ring Ring (1973), at KMH, and Benny Andersson produced most of Anni-Frid Lyngstad's solo album Frida ensam (1975) at the studio. The ABBA historian Carl Magnus Palm notes that the group did not work extensively there. Parts of the original Swedish-language version of "Fernando" were recorded at KMH, as was a hi-hat overdub for "Dancing Queen" in December 1975. From the early 1980s the bassist Rutger Gunnarsson, a regular on ABBA's sessions, worked at the studio for close to twenty years as a session musician, arranger and producer.

The studio became known mainly for dansband recordings. Palm describes dansband as a genre particular to Sweden and Scandinavia: the word translates as "dance band", but in Sweden it has come to mean a very specific kind of band, with "mild vocals and somewhat bland, syrupy arrangements". One of the bands was Vikingarna, who recorded several albums in their Kramgoa låtar series at KMH, including Kramgoa låtar 9 (1981). Holm also produced Främling (1983), the debut album of the singer Carola, at the studio. Palm calls it the biggest album of all time in Sweden, with an alleged one million copies sold.

Other artists who recorded at KMH include the Soviet singer Alla Pugacheva, who made her English-language album Watch Out (1985) there, and the Cuban pianist Bebo Valdés, who recorded Recuerdos de Habana at the studio in 1998. Herbie Hancock played on sessions for the Swedish drummer Peter Johannesson's album Sixtus in 1995, and the Esbjörn Svensson Trio recorded there in 1996.

After Holm left, the studio was run by Karlsmyr and the engineer Åke Grahn. It later passed to the singer and producer Ola Håkansson, who added a separate mixing room, and then to Lars Anderson, a son of ABBA's manager Stig "Stikkan" Anderson.

=== Polar Studios (2008–2011) ===
Polar Studios, opened in 1978 by ABBA's Benny Andersson and Björn Ulvaeus and their manager Stig Anderson, had to leave its original premises on Kungsholmen in 2004. The business, by then no longer connected with ABBA or the record company Polar Music, moved into the former KMH premises in 2008. Its long-time engineer Lennart Östlund continued to work there. Candlemass recorded Death Magic Doom (2009) at the studio. The producer Chris Laney recorded and engineered Diamonds and Dirt (2011), the solo album of the former Thin Lizzy and Motörhead guitarist Brian Robertson, at Polar Studios. Polar Studios later moved on to another location.

=== Ingrid Studios (2011–present) ===
Bysistorget 6 in 2020. The studio is entered through the café.

In 2011 Björn Yttling and Pontus Winnberg took over the studio and renamed it Ingrid, in tribute to Ingrid Bergman and to the building's past as a cinema. Winnberg is also one half of the songwriting and production duo Bloodshy & Avant, and a member of the band Amason. According to the music magazine Gaffa, both had often travelled to the United States to produce records, and the studio became a way of bringing artists to Stockholm instead. In 2012 a group of fourteen musicians, among them Lykke Li and members of Peter Bjorn and John and Miike Snow, launched the artist collective and record label Ingrid, which is based at the studio.

The producer Pelle Gunnerfeldt, who has worked with the Hives, was based at the studio by 2016. Gustav Lindelöw was the studio's chief engineer in 2020. The string arranger Erik Arvinder's Stockholm Studio Orchestra sometimes records at the studio, and Lindelöw makes string mixes for the orchestra's clients.

Chrissie Hynde recorded her first solo album, Stockholm (2014), at the studio with Yttling as producer. After seeing Yttling's tennis racket in the studio she called her friend John McEnroe, who went on to play guitar on the album. Yttling has said that she named the album after the city because she liked the studio and Stockholm. Primal Scream recorded parts of Chaosmosis (2016) at Ingrid, with Yttling as one of the producers and songwriters, and the band's singer Bobby Gillespie told Dagens Nyheter that they had a very creative time in Stockholm working with him. Lykke Li, who has made most of her albums with Yttling, recorded The Afterparty (2026) there, including its string section.

Franz Ferdinand recorded parts of Right Thoughts, Right Words, Right Action (2013) at the studio, and the American band Wild Nothing came to Ingrid to record Life of Pause (2016). Peter Bjorn and John have made several albums there, among them Breakin' Point (2016). Robert Forster of the Go-Betweens rehearsed and recorded Strawberries (2025) at the studio, with Peter Morén of Peter Bjorn and John as producer. Företagshistoria also names the Hives, Icona Pop and Veronica Maggio among the artists who have used the studio.

In March 2020, during the COVID-19 pandemic, 36h Ingrid, a 36-hour festival, was streamed live from the studio on Twitch, with Peter Bjorn and John, Shout Out Louds and Johnossi among the performers and an appeal for donations to musicians who had lost their income. It was organised by the Ingrid label and studio, and a second edition followed in May. For the studio's fiftieth anniversary in 2021 the label released the EP Golden Jubilee, which includes "Stranger", Holm's original demo of Carola's "Främling". In 2021 Yttling and Winnberg also started the podcast Back to the Music with Ingrid, recorded at the studio, with the musician Sarah Snavely. Its guests have included Lykke Li, Tove Styrke, Howlin' Pelle Almqvist of the Hives and Richard Oakes of Suede.

In 2023 the newspaper Göteborgs-Posten described the studio as having become the heart of Stockholm's semi-alternative music scene, and wrote that Winnberg's band Amason sometimes play impromptu sets on the terrace of the adjoining café.

== Facilities ==
The control room in 2019. The red velvet cinema seats at the back were left over from the building's time as a cinema.

=== Building and rooms ===
The studio is in a residential building from the early 1930s, designed by the architect Joel Norborg, at the corner of Hornsgatan and Bysistorget, and is entered through a café facing the square. The City of Stockholm has classified the property as green, its category for buildings of particular historical, cultural-historical, environmental or artistic value. Besides the main recording room and the control room there is a separate mixing room, and several smaller rooms are let to songwriters and producers. In 2020 one of them was used by Pelle Almqvist of the Hives. According to Yttling, the Norwegian band A-ha has mixed an album in one of the smaller rooms. There are flats above and around the studio, and the premises have been soundproofed since the 1970s.

The interior is largely unchanged since the 1970s. The Stockholm City Museum documented the studio in 2019 and described it as one of the city's last small music studios of the older kind, with wood panelling and fabric in brown and red, built-in ashtrays and two red velvet cinema seats left behind. According to the museum, angled wall and ceiling surfaces give the room good acoustics, and the echo in an echo chamber is adjusted with curtains. Yttling has said that the studio "looks like a winter cabin from a Roger Moore James Bond movie".

In 2014 the owners also ran a smaller studio, Spegeln, in the former Spegelteatern theatre on Björngårdsgatan.

=== Equipment ===
The control room and its mixing desk in 2019

The control room with the mixing desk and patch bay, 2019

KMH opened in 1971 with a four-track Scully tape machine. The mixing console is an API desk that Winnberg bought from a studio in Munich, where according to the studio it had been used by the producer Conny Plank. A grand piano from 1929 was added in 2020. The owners use a set way of miking the drums and the piano so that recordings made at the studio share a recognisable sound, an approach that Yttling has compared to Kraftwerk's Kling Klang Studio. Yttling has said that the studio "has a very '70s sound" and that "if you want to get a Fleetwood Mac drum sound, it's perfect".

=== Musikmaskin I ===
Musikmaskin I ("Music Machine I") is a mechanical sculpture that ABBA's designer Rune Söderqvist and Sune Selander built for the entrance hall of Polar Studios, on a commission from Benny Andersson. It is assembled from second-hand furniture and instruments, with motors, magnets and a simple computer to drive them. It was meant to be programmable, but according to Palm it never got further than a somewhat clumsy version of ABBA's "Thank You for the Music". By 2004 it no longer played. According to the Swedish magazine Studio, it blew the fuses so often that the staff eventually stopped replacing them. The machine remained unsold when Polar's inventory was auctioned in 2004. Palm writes that it was installed on the ground floor of the Hornsgatan premises before Polar Studios moved there. In 2016 it stood in the café at the entrance.

== Selected recordings ==
A selection of releases recorded wholly or partly at the studio, as credited in their liner notes or described in the press. The years are release years.

KMH Studios (1971–2008)
Year	Artist	Release	Work at the studio
1973	ABBA	Ring Ring	Three tracks
1975	Anni-Frid Lyngstad	Frida ensam	Most of the album
1981	Vikingarna	Kramgoa låtar 9	Recording
1983	Carola	Främling	Recording
1984	Herreys	"Diggi-Loo Diggi-Ley"	Parts of the recording, mixing
1985	Alla Pugacheva	Watch Out	Recording
1997	Krister Andersson and Esbjörn Svensson Trio	Intromotion	Recording
1999	Bebo Valdés	Recuerdos de Habana	Recording
2001	Peter Johannesson featuring Herbie Hancock	Sixtus	Recording (1995)

Polar Studios (2008–2011)
Year	Artist	Release	Work at the studio
2009	Candlemass	Death Magic Doom	Recording
2011	Brian Robertson	Diamonds and Dirt	Recording

Ingrid Studios (2011–present)
Year	Artist	Release	Work at the studio
2013	Franz Ferdinand	Right Thoughts, Right Words, Right Action	Parts of the album
2014	Chrissie Hynde	Stockholm	Recording
2014	Lykke Li	I Never Learn	Parts of the album
2014	Charli XCX	Sucker	The track "Breaking Up"
2015	Refused	Freedom	Recording
2015	Nate Ruess	Grand Romantic	Parts of the album
2015	Amason	Sky City	Recording, partly at Spegeln
2016	Miike Snow	iii	Parts of the album
2016	Primal Scream	Chaosmosis	Parts of the album
2016	Kygo	Cloud Nine	The track "Fiction"
2016	Peter Bjorn and John	Breakin' Point	Recording
2017	Mando Diao	Good Times	Recording
2017	Loreen	Ride	Recording
2018	Neko Case	Hell-On	The track "Bad Luck"
2018	Viagra Boys	Street Worms	Parts of the album
2022	Shout Out Louds	House	Recording
2023	Ghost	Phantomime	Parts of the EP
2025	Robert Forster	Strawberries	Recording
2025	Yttling Jazz	Illegal Hit	Recording and mixing
2026	Lykke Li	The Afterparty	Recording
