= Falling Out (Peter Bjorn and John album) =

Studio album by Peter Bjorn and John
- Released: 4 October 2004
- Recorded: Gröndahl Studio, Stockholm and Hogalid Studio, Stockholm, late 2003 – early 2004
- Genre: Indie pop
- Length: 40:22
- Label: Planekonomi
- Producer: Björn Yttling

Peter Bjorn and John chronology
| Peter Bjorn and John (2002) | Falling Out (2004) | Writer's Block (2006) |

Singles from Falling Out
- 1. "Teen Love" Released: late 2004; 2. "Tailormade (promo only)" Released: early 2005

Beats, Traps & Backgrounds EP
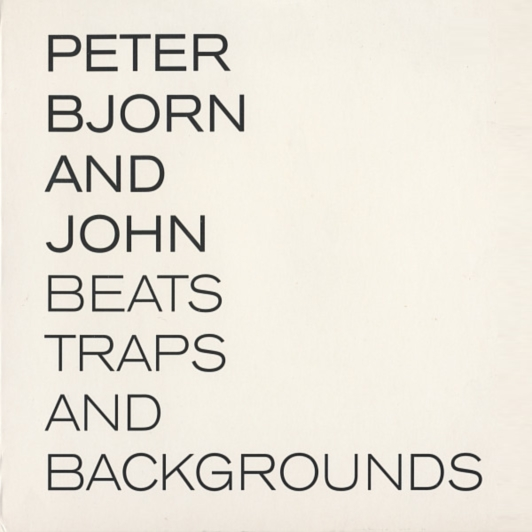
- Cover of the EP, released on CD in late 2004

Professional ratings
Review scores
| Source | Rating |
|---|---|
| AllMusic | 4.5/5 stars |

Falling Out is the second album by Peter Bjorn and John, released on 4 October 2004. While no videos were released, three singles were derived from the album; the promo-only single for Tailormade and full releases for Teen Love and It Beats Me Every Time.

The last track on the album, 'Goodbye Again, Or...' is of very low quality in all formats, due to the only recording of the song coming from lead singer and guitarist Peter Morén's mobile phone- added to the album on the last day before mastering. During the tour for his first solo album The Last Tycoon, Morén has performed the song acoustically in an extended form featuring a harmonica solo.

Wichita Recordings, responsible for later re-releases of the band's early work, later re-released this album with bonus tracks taken from the singles derived from the album, in the same manner as their debut work. The bonus tracks on this re-release included the extra tracks from the 'Beats, Traps & Backgrounds' EP and 'Fortune Favours Only The Brave', from the 'Teen Love' single.

The single covers are notable for being composed entirely of text in the same font as that on the monochrome album art, which itself is a homage to The Velvet Underground's third, self-titled album. The all-text theme carried over into the band's live shows, with the backdrop printed with the word 'Backdrop' repeating endlessly over it, and the amplifiers decorated in the same manner.

== Themes ==
From the liner notes of the 2006 Wichita reissue of the CD:

"In everyday life we tend to compromise. This is neither good nor bad. Well, in art it's merely negative, when in life it's just necessary. We give up things we believe in to avoid being left behind, or locked out. In this compromising life we also tend to fall in love. Not just with people, but with places, philosophies, societies and our picture of what life should be. We stare sheeplike in the direction of this ideal picture. But we'll never get there. That way we're bound to be let down. We get confused. And we hurt each other.

But these clashes, bullfights and mannered conflicts are there for a reason. We need them there in order to grow and to move on. We need to be confused. Sometimes we fall out with ourselves, and our expectations of ourselves. These are the hardest ones. But also the most important ones. Here are our songs about falling out. Some about falling in as well, but mostly out. Have a listen."

== Track listing ==
1. "Far Away, By My Side" – 3:22
2. "Money" – 4:02
3. "It Beats Me Every Time" – 3:37
4. "Does It Matter Now?" – 4:33
5. "Big Black Coffin" – 6:31
6. "Start Making Sense" – 2:14
7. "Teen Love" (The Concretes cover) – 3:37
8. "All Those Expectations" – 4:53
9. "Tailormade" – 5:36
10. "Goodbye Again, Or..." – 2:02

== Teen Love (single) ==
The Peter Bjorn And John version of The Concretes' 'Teen Love' was released as a single in 2004. It has two B-sides.

1. "Teen Love" (The Concretes cover) – 3:37
2. "Fortune Favours Only the Brave" – 3:19
3. "Silly Girl" (Television Personalities cover) – 2:49

== Beats, Traps & Backgrounds (EP) ==
This EP, also released in 2004, doubles as the single release for 'It Beats Me Every Time'. The EP shows the more experimental side of the 'Falling Out' sessions, as opposed to the classic rock, Beach Boys and Elvis Costello -influenced sound of the main album. It is described by the band as a "mini-album". The EP entered at number 45 on the Swedish singles chart, where it stayed for one week. The song 'Punks Jump Up' is an instrumental jam recorded by accident during the sessions for the song 'Money', and is named after the electro-pop duo of the same name. The song 'See Through' was previously released on an early single. The EP bridges the musical gap between the band's earlier, baroque-pop sound, and their later, more experimental material found in albums such as Seaside Rock, using unusual techniques such as movie samples in 'Unreleased Backgrounds'.

1. "It Beats Me Every Time" – 3:37
2. "(I Just Wanna) See Through" – 2:49
3. "The Trap's My Trip" – 5:12
4. "Punks Jump Up" – 1:10
5. "Unreleased Backgrounds" – 6:45
