= Writer's Block (Peter Bjorn and John album) =

Studio album by Peter Bjorn and John
- Released: 14 August 2006
- Genres: Indie pop, indie rock
- Length: 45:31
- Labels: Wichita, V2, Startime
- Producers: Peter Morén, Björn Yttling, John Eriksson

Peter Bjorn and John chronology
| Falling Out (2004) | Writer's Block (2006) | Seaside Rock (2008) |

Singles from Writer's Block
- 1. "Young Folks" Released: 1 August 2006; 2. "Let's Call It Off" Released: 30 October 2006; 3. "Objects of My Affection" Released: 16 April 2007

Writer's Block Remixes
- Alternate "night-time" artwork used for the cover of the remix album.

Writer's Block is the third album by Peter Bjorn and John. It was released in the UK on 14 August 2006 and in the US on 6 February 2007. Taking a departure from the production of their first two albums, Writer's Block is an experimental, semi-concept album based around themes of the highs and lows of romance.

The inner sleeve art, as well as containing handwritten liner notes, features a tall, folding illustration of a building in the neighborhood alluded to in the album title's wordplay, with each window of the building representing a song from the album. The title is said to be a reference to the Hornstull neighborhood in Stockholm, where the band is based, which has a high concentration of creative artists (hence 'Writer's Block'). The songs take inspiration from a variety of artists. While the album is said to have a slightly more stripped down sound compared to the guitar-dominated previous albums, the arrangements were still too complex in some cases to be played live in their original form- most notably 'The Chills' continues to be entirely reworked for live performances. Later, the album Gimme Some would aim to address this issue directly.

The album had three singles; "Young Folks" (featuring Victoria Bergsman, formerly of The Concretes on guest vocals), "Objects of My Affection", and "Let's Call It Off", the latter two using different versions of the songs than those found on the albums. All three songs had videos, the first music videos by the band to be widely available to international audiences. The track "Young Folks" was ranked at #5 on Pitchfork Media's list of the top 100 songs of 2006. Writer's Block was ranked at #24 on Pitchfork's list of the top 50 albums of 2006. The album is generally seen as one of the defining albums of the mid-2000s indie scene.

== Reception ==
Professional ratings
Aggregate scores
| Source | Rating |
|---|---|
| Metacritic | 82/100 |
Review scores
| Source | Rating |
| AllMusic | 4.5/5 stars |
| The A.V. Club | A− |
| Entertainment Weekly | B+ |
| The Guardian | 4/5 stars |
| Mojo | 3/5 stars |
| NME | 9/10 |
| Pitchfork | 8.5/10 |
| Rolling Stone | 3.5/5 stars |
| Spin | 4/5 stars |
| Uncut | 4/5 stars |

Writer's Block is the third and most commercially successful album by Peter Bjorn And John. Unlike the band's two earlier albums, which were more in the vein of revivalist music and influenced by songwriters such as John Lennon and Elvis Costello, Writer's Block marked a more experimental and 'indie rock' approach. The album is notable for containing several tracks that feature prominent use of vocalisation techniques as major instruments; single Young Folks is the most well-known, but single 'Objects Of My Affection' and album tracks 'Up Against The Wall' and 'The Chills' are also examples of this. The album version of the track 'Let's Call It Off' contains a sample of the song 'Ancient Curse', the B-Side to the Young Folks single, at the end. Along with the reissues of the first two Peter Bjorn And John albums with bonus tracks, Writer's Block was rereleased with an extra disc featuring the B-Sides, remixes, single mixes and remixes from the album campaign, along with the videos of the album's three singles and three live tracks from the Roskilde Festival, 2007. Writer's Block was also ranked at #5 album of the year by Almost Cool and #10 by Under the Radar. This album was #44 on Rolling Stone's list of the Top 50 Albums of 2007. The title track is a sixteen-second snippet of 'found sound' from what appears to be a shopping mall or other public area, with the melody of 'Young Folks' playing in the background.

== Track listing ==
All songs written by Peter Morén, Björn Yttling and John Eriksson.

1. "Writer's Block" - 0:16
2. "Objects of My Affection" - 4:35
3. "Young Folks" (featuring Victoria Bergsman) - 4:39
4. "Amsterdam" - 3:37
5. "Start to Melt" - 2:15
6. "Up Against the Wall" - 7:06
7. "Paris 2004" - 3:52
8. "Let's Call It Off" - 4:05
9. "The Chills" - 3:50
10. "Roll the Credits" - 6:31
11. "Poor Cow" - 4:45

== US bonus disc ==
The US Release features the single mix of "Let's Call It Off" on the main disc in place of the original.

1. "Ancient Curse" - 3:24
2. "All Those Expectations (Weak Remix)"
3. "Self-Pity" - 4:18
4. "Let's Call It Off" (Original Album Mix)
5. "Sitar Folks"
6. "Young Folks (Beyond The Wizard's Sleeve Re-Animation)"

== UK special edition bonus disc ==
The single mix of "Objects Of My Affection" uses more folk-rock production and use of acoustic guitar with a more noticeable vocal melody than the windswept, shoegazing-style album version, while the single mix of "Let's Call It Off" uses steel drums and a 'calypso' style in contrast to the 'Merseyside Beat'-feel of the album version.

1. "Young Folks(Beyond The Wizard's Sleeve Re-Animation)"
2. "Young Folks (diPLO Remix)"
3. "Let's Call It Off (Jeans Team Remix)"
4. "Let's Call It Off (Black Eyes Remix)" (originally the B-side to the 'Objects Of My Affection' single)
5. "Ancient Curse" (originally the B-side to the 'Young Folks' single)
6. "Self-Pity" (originally the B-side to the 'Let's Call It Off' single)
7. "Let's Call It Off (Single Mix)"
8. "Objects Of My Affection (Single Mix)"
9. "The Chills (Live At Roskilde 2007)"
10. "Paris 2004 (Live At Roskilde 2007)"
11. "Objects Of My Affection (Live At Roskilde 2007)"
12. "Young Folks" (video)
13. "Let's Call It Off" (video)
14. "Objects Of My Affection" (video)

== Writer's Block Remixes ==
In April 2009, following the success of the album, a compilation of remixes and interpretations of songs from the album was released by the Drella label on a limited run of 500 vinyl LPs.

1. "Sitar Folks" – Palak Balti and Papadam (Incorporating elements of "Young Folks")
2. "Words Round Your Waist" – Sheriff (Incorporating elements of "Start To Melt")
3. "Buddha Machine" – Nils Berg Trio (Incorporating elements of "Up Against The Wall")
4. "Paris 2004" – Mikael Augustson
5. "Roll The Credits" – Smile (Another group to which Björn Yttling belongs, not the London band of the same name)
6. "Poor Cobra" – Hortlax Cobra (Remix of "Poor Cow"; pseudonym of John Eriksson)
7. "The Chills (Thieves Like Us Remix)"
8. "Let's Call It Off (Girl Talk Remix)"
9. "Amsterdam (Paddington Distortion Combo Remix)"
10. "Objects Of My Affection (Boom Bip Remix)"

== Charts ==
Chart performance
| Chart (2006–2007) | Peak position |
|---|---|
| Belgian Albums (Ultratop Flanders) | 90 |
| Canadian Albums (Nielsen SoundScan) | 50 |
| Irish Albums (IRMA) | 26 |
| Scottish Albums (Official Charts) | 72 |
| UK Albums (Official Charts) | 68 |
| US Billboard 200 | 155 |
| US Heatseekers Albums (Billboard) | 1 |
| US Independent Albums (Billboard) | 14 |
| US Top Tastemaker Albums (Billboard) | 13 |

== Certifications ==
Certifications
| Region | Certification | Certified units/sales |
|---|---|---|
| United Kingdom (BPI) | Silver | 60,000^{‡} |
^{‡} Sales+streaming figures based on certification alone.

== In other media ==
- The song Let's Call it Off was featured in the mixtape/ EP version of Rap artist Drake's 2009 mixtape So Far Gone.
- The song The Chills is featured in MLB 2K8.
- The song Young Folks is featured on the FIFA 08 and MLB 2K13 soundtracks and the 2008 film 21, amongst many others.
- Rap artist Kanye West rapped over "Young Folks" for his 2007 mixtape Can't Tell Me Nothing. In 2009, rap artist Azealia Banks rapped over "The Chills," retitling the track "The Chill$."
