= Living Thing =

2009 studio album by Peter Bjorn and John

Studio album by Peter Bjorn and John
- Released: 30 March 2009
- Genre: Indie pop
- Length: 47:08
- Label: Wichita (UK); Startime (US); Cooperative (GER)

Peter Bjorn and John chronology
| Seaside Rock (2008) | Living Thing (2009) | Gimme Some (2011) |

Singles from Living Thing
- 1. "Nothing To Worry About" Released: 2009; 2. "It Don't Move Me" Released: 2009; 3. "Lay It Down" Released: 2009

Living Thing is the fifth album by Peter Bjorn and John, released on 30 March 2009 in the UK and 31 March in the US. Much darker and more experimental than their previous album Writer's Block, Living Thing expands the sound of the group by taking more cues from hip-hop and electronic music, in particular the work of African electronic funk musician William Onyeabor. Other influences included Depeche Mode, Fleetwood Mac and OMD. Three singles were eventually released from the album: "Nothing To Worry About," 'It Don't Move Me," and "Lay It Down."

== Reception ==
Professional ratings
Review scores
| Source | Rating |
|---|---|
| Allmusic | 4/5 stars |
| Blender | 3.5/5 stars |
| Entertainment Weekly | (B) |
| The Guardian | 3/5 stars |
| NME | (5/10) |
| Pitchfork Media | (5.5/10) |
| Rolling Stone | 4/5 stars |
| PopMatters | (7/10) |
| Spin | 4/5 stars |
| Slant Magazine | 2.5/5 stars |

Initial critical response to Living Thing was generally positive. At Metacritic, the album has received a score of 68 based on 31 reviews. However, some were unsatisfied with the apparent darker tone of the album as a follow-up to their previous success with Young Folks.

== Track listing ==
1. "The Feeling" – 3:08
2. "It Don't Move Me" – 3:21
3. "Just the Past" – 5:10
4. "Nothing to Worry About" – 2:56
5. "I'm Losing My Mind" – 3:44
6. "Living Thing" – 4:38
7. "I Want You!" – 3:39
8. "Lay It Down" – 3:26
9. "Stay This Way" – 4:19
10. "Blue Period Picasso" – 4:36
11. "4 Out of 5" – 4:08
12. "Last Night" – 4:03

== Charts ==
Chart performance
| Chart (2009) | Peak position |
|---|---|
| Canadian Albums (Nielsen SoundScan) | 73 |
| Dutch Alternative Albums (Alternative Top 30) | 21 |
| UK Albums (Official Charts) | 162 |
| US Billboard 200 | 92 |
| US Independent Albums (Billboard) | 7 |
| US Top Alternative Albums (Billboard) | 23 |
| US Top Tastemaker Albums (Billboard) | 13 |
