= Peter Bjorn and John (album) =

Studio album by Peter Bjorn and John
- Released: November 2002
- Recorded: Studio Gröndahl
- Genre: Indie pop
- Length: 34:20
- Label: Beat That! Records
- Producer: Björn Yttling

Peter Bjorn and John chronology
Peter Bjorn and John (2002)	Falling Out (2005)

Singles from Peter Bjorn and John
- 1. "Failing And Passing / Education Circle" Released: 2001; 2. "I Don't Know What I Want Us To Do" Released: 2002; 3. "People They Know" Released: 2002; 4. "100 M Of Hurdles EP" Released: April 2003

Professional ratings
Review scores
Source	Rating
Allmusic	4/5 stars

Peter Bjorn and John is the first album by Swedish indie-pop band Peter Bjorn and John. Its style takes influences from baroque-pop, post-punk and soul ('From Now On'), and it is colloquially referred to by the band as 'The Red Album'. Self-titled, it is the only album by the band not to follow their tradition of naming albums with two words, the first with two syllables and the last with one. However, it does adhere to their rule of always having three of something, if not the band members themselves, on the front cover. The Wichita Recordings re-release included five bonus tracks from the album's four singles; 'Firing Blanks' & 'Don't Be Skew' from the 'I Don't Know What I Want Us To Do' single, 'Le Crique' from the 'People They Know' single, and 'The Fan' and 'Saturday Night At The Parties' from the '100 M Of Hurdles' EP. Session musicians appear on some tracks, as the band originally intended to be a quartet. The album and its singles feature artwork designed by Eric Segol.

== Track listing ==
1. "I Don't Know What I Want Us to Do" - 3:26
2. "Failing and Passing" - 3:57
3. "People They Know" - 3:32
4. "A Mutual Misunderstanding" - 2:49
5. "From Now On" - 5:45
6. "Matchmaker" - 2:29
7. "Collect, Select, Reflect" - 3:31
8. "100 M of Hurdles" - 2:58
9. "Education Circle" - 3:14
10. "Please, Go Home" - 2:28

== I Don't Know What I Want Us To Do (single) ==
The opening track on the album originally began as a cover of 'Smokey' Robinson's 'I Don't Blame You At All'. The song eventually became the first proper single from their debut album.

1. "I Don't Know What I Want Us To Do" - 3:27
2. "Firing Blanks" - 3:13
3. "Don't Be Skew" - 2:22

== People They Know (single) ==
The second proper single from the band's debut album, the A-side 'People They Know' features drums played "with the wrong side of a brush and a piece of rotten wood". The B-side, 'Le Crique', has been described by Peter as "one of our most experimental band recordings, layered guitars and Velvet-feel (as in Velvet Underground), love it".

1. "People They Know" - 3:33
2. "Le Crique" - 6:52

== 100 M of Hurdles (EP) ==
The last release from this album, the 100 M Of Hurdles EP showcases two songs (the last two on the EP) that hint towards the darker, more melancholy direction of their second album, Falling Out.

1. "100 M of Hurdles" - 2:59
2. "The Tearjerker" - 3:11
3. "The Fan" - 5:21
4. "Saturday Night at the Parties" - 2:25
