= Darker Days (Peter Bjorn and John album) =

Studio album by Peter Bjorn and John
- Released: 19 October 2018
- Studio: Atlantic Studios, Stockholm
- Genre: Indie pop
- Length: 42:03
- Label: INGRID

Peter Bjorn and John chronology
| Breakin' Point (2016) | Darker Days (2018) | Endless Dream (2020) |

Singles from Darker Days
- 1. "One for the Team" Released: 21 September 2018; 2. "Every Other Night" Released: 21 September 2018; 3. "Gut Feeling" Released: 21 September 2018; 4. "Wrapped Around the Axle" Released: 12 October 2018

Darker Days is the eighth album by Peter Bjorn and John. It was released on 19 October 2018 on the INGRID label.

== Background ==
The album is a follow-up to their 2016 album Breakin' Point, and was inspired by 1970s music, the group Simon and Garfunkel, and guitarist Jack White. A press release by the band summarised the album's themes as being, "Peter tackling what's happening in the world right now, Bjorn delving into relationship issues and John, the most existential, exploring the shadows of our own psyche." Before the album was released, each band member put forth one single that they had written: "One for the Team", "Gut Feeling", and "Every Other Night" for simultaneous digital release, along with matching music videos. They later released a fourth single called "Wrapped Around the Axle", which the first track on the album contains elements of.

In early 2019, the band released a three-song digital EP titled "EPBJ" as an intended appendix to the album. This included the titular track "Darker Days" that was left off the album itself. Elements of this track can be heard in the last track of the album, "Heaven And Hell", though the vinyl release of the album uses a shortened edit that excludes these elements. The band also released a three-song digital EP containing audio from a live studio session at INGRID Studios in Stockholm.

== Reception ==
The album has received generally favourable reviews. Tim Sendra from Allmusic praised what he called a "back to basics" approach after the previous electronic-focused Breakin' Point, and called the new album darker, rejuvenated, and confident. Chris Watkeys called the album, "fresh, bright, and shiny, and pretty much instantly accessible," despite its title.

== Track listing ==
All songs written by Peter Morén, Björn Yttling and John Eriksson.

1. "Longer Nights (Intro)" – 0:55
2. "One for the Team" – 3:24
3. "Every Other Night" – 2:47
4. "Gut Feeling" – 3:02
5. "Living a Dream" – 4:27
6. "Velvet Sky" – 2:53
7. "Wrapped Around the Axle" – 4:04
8. "Dark Ages" – 3:20
9. "Sick and Tired" – 4:01
10. "Silicon Valley Blues" – 4:33
11. "Heaven and Hell" – 8:37
