= Young Folks =

2006 single by Peter Bjorn and John

Single by Peter Bjorn and John featuring Victoria Bergsman

from the album Writer's Block
- B-side: "Ancient Curse"
- Released: 7 August 2006
- Genre: Indie pop; indie rock
- Length: 4:38 (album version); 4:05 (single version)
- Label: Wichita; P B and J
- Songwriters: Björn Yttling; Peter Morén; John Eriksson
- Producers: Peter Bjorn and John

Peter Bjorn and John singles chronology
"Tailormade" (2005)	"Young Folks" (2006)	"Let's Call It Off" (2006)

Victoria Bergsman singles chronology
"On the Radio" (With the Concretes, 2006)	"Young Folks" (2006)	"Lost & Found" (As Taken by Trees, 2007)

Music video
- "Young Folks" on YouTube

"Young Folks" is the first single from Swedish band Peter Bjorn and John's third album, Writer's Block (2006). The single features Victoria Bergsman (Taken by Trees, ex-Concretes) as a guest vocalist. The song received generally positive reviews from critics and performed well in the record charts, reaching the top 40 in Canada, the Czech Republic, Finland, Germany, Hungary, Ireland, and the United Kingdom.

A music video, directed by Ted Malmros (Shout Out Louds) with animation by Graham Samuels, made for the song features animated versions of Peter and Bergsman performing the song in various locations.

== Background ==
By the time Peter Bjorn and John began working on their third album Writer's Block, the band had reached a crossroads. Their previous album Falling Out had failed to meet their expectations, leading them to consider disbanding. "We talked about actually splitting up during that period," drummer John Eriksson recalled in a 2016 interview with Song Exploder. "We said, 'Okay, let's make one more record. But if no one wants to release this on a proper label, then whatever.'" The new album was recorded on a low budget in bassist Björn Yttling’s modest studio space in Högalid, Stockholm.

The foundation for "Young Folks" came from a piano melody Yttling initially imagined as a jazz piece: "I had the idea for the tune on the piano and at first thought it was going to be a jazz song, because it sounded like a Duke Ellington track. Then I played it on a guitar and it sounded more like a pop song. I whistled a placeholder for the melody just so we could remember it, intending to replace it with an instrument later, maybe an organ or something. Then we put the whistle through a tape delay machine… Then it was like: 'Oh, it sounds good, let's keep it.'".

The now-iconic whistling was performed by Yttling on the recording, though it would later be taken over live by frontman Peter Morén, who admitted, "After touring I got to be really good at whistling, but at the beginning I was terrible. Especially if I had a slight cold or a hangover... People were like, 'This band sucks – they can't whistle.'"

Sonically, the band embraced a stripped-back, almost DIY approach. They avoided using cymbals due to the acoustics of the small room, with Eriksson instead playing a minimalist beat inspired by Daft Punk's "Robot Rock". They layered in unconventional percussion — including borrowed bongos, the sound of boots on a laminated floor run through spring reverb, and glissandos on tubular bells — to compensate for the lack of cymbals.

Vocally, the band envisioned "Young Folks" as a duet. After initially considering several singers, they asked Victoria Bergsman of The Concretes to join. The first attempt failed because the key was too low for her voice, forcing the band to pitch the entire track up — inadvertently making the whistling higher and more difficult to perform live. Lyrically, Morén described the song as depicting two jaded people meeting in a bar and cautiously exploring the possibility of connection. Despite its title and playful tone, he clarified: "It's not about young people... It's called "Young Folks" and has a sort of childish stance with the whistling and everything, but the song is about people who are kind of burnt out from relationships.".

Lyrically, the song explores the feeling of new love and connection without overcomplicating it. Morén has described the lyrics as intentionally minimal and direct, aiming to capture "the moment when two people first meet and nothing else matters." The recurring refrain — "We don't care about the young folks / talking about the young folks" — reflects a desire to ignore outside judgment and focus on an intimate, present experience.

== Reception ==
The song first attracted notice on websites such as Myspace and YouTube, and was used in a number of European commercials and television shows. Since mid-2007, the song has earned extensive airplay on American radio, most notably on dance radio outlets like KNHC/Seattle, KNGY/San Francisco and Sirius Satellite's The Beat. It is notable for being a popular song with whistling (the whistling was originally added in as a placeholder for another instrument).

The song was ranked No. 5 on Pitchfork Media's "Top 100 Tracks of 2006" list. The song was also voted No. 2 in the 2006 NME Track of the Year poll. Planet Sound named this their No. 2 single of 2006. The song was named the No. 1 song of 2007 according to the iTunes Store. Y-Rock on XPN also named the song No. 1 of 2007. In October 2011, NME placed it at No. 92 on its list 150 Best Tracks of the Past 15 Years. It was included in Spinner's 10 Best Whistling Parts in Songs. Rolling Stone put the song also on its list of the 15 Best Whistling Songs of All Time. Australian radio station Triple J ranked the song at number 16 on its Hottest 100 of 2006 list. The single was re-released on 17 September 2007, reaching No. 13 in the United Kingdom, beating the original chart position of No. 33 in 2006.

Upon release, "Young Folks" received widespread acclaim from critics. In its review of Writer's Block, Pitchfork's Marc Hogan praised the track, writing “The infectious, lazily whistled hook and playful bongo drums of first single "Young Folks" are immediately inviting, but the song's second layer-- the coy chemistry between Morén and ex-Concretes singer Victoria Bergsman-- adds depth, as the song's two hopeful strangers discover each other by chance". AllMusic's Tim Sendra wrote "they added the whistling as a marker for a future instrument but realized the offhanded whistle was just what the song needed. These are the decisions that make for greatness. Sure, the songs would have worked fine with just guitar-bass-drums backing, but the arrangements are like huge hooks that catch you and won't let go." The Guardian's Michael Hann review of the single referred to it as "so good", while Treble praised it as "irresistible" and "fantastically danceable". The song's success helped propel Writer's Block to a Metacritic score of 79, reflecting generally favorable reviews.

== Music video ==
The animated video for the song was directed by Ted Malmros with animation by Graham Samuels. The video starts off with Peter and Victoria sitting in a park, on a bench. Peter teaches Victoria how to whistle. Then the video switches over to them both sitting in a bus where the song starts. Throughout the video, scenes of the band playing the song can be seen and eventually the video ends with a big party where everybody "seems to disappear".

== Live performances ==
The group performed the song on Late Night with Conan O'Brien on 29 January 2007, and on The Tonight Show with Jay Leno on 18 May 2007 (the latter with Tonight Show band member Vicki Randle on bongos). On 29 September 2007, the band played "Young Folks", with Victoria Bergsman's vocals, on Friday Night with Jonathan Ross on BBC1. When the band performed the song at the 2007 Coachella Valley Music and Arts Festival, Bergsman's vocals were performed by Bebban Stenborg of Shout Out Louds. On Peter Bjorn and John's 2008 Australian tour, Victoria Bergsman's vocals were performed by Tracyanne Campbell of Camera Obscura.

In 2007, Kanye West sampled "Young Folks" for his mixtape Can't Tell Me Nothing. Later, he and Peter Bjorn and John performed the song together at the Way Out West festival in Gothenburg.

== Track listings ==
7-inch single

A. "Young Folks" (featuring Victoria Bergsman)
B. "Ancient Curse"

2006 CD single

1. "Young Folks" (featuring Victoria Bergsman)
2. "Ancient Curse"
3. "All Those Expectations" (weak mix)

2007 CD single

1. "Young Folks" (featuring Victoria Bergsman)
2. "Young Folks" (OrtzRoka remix)
3. "Young Folks" (Beyond the Wizards Sleeve re-animation)

== Charts ==
=== Weekly charts ===
Chart (2006–2008)	Peak position
Australia (ARIA)	42
Belgium (Ultratip Bubbling Under Flanders)	2
Belgium (Ultratip Bubbling Under Wallonia)	7
Canada Hot 100 (Billboard)	27
Czech Republic Airplay (ČNS IFPI)	37
Finland (Suomen virallinen lista)	9
Germany (GfK)	31
Hungary (Rádiós Top 40)	13
Ireland (IRMA)	24
Netherlands (Single Top 100)	75
Scottish Singles Sales (Official Charts)	14
UK Singles (Official Charts)	13
US Adult Alternative Airplay (Billboard)	16
US Alternative Airplay (Billboard)	22
US Bubbling Under Hot 100 (Billboard)	10

=== Year-end charts ===
Chart (2007)	Position
UK Singles (OCC)	151

== Certifications ==
Region	Certification	Certified units/sales
Brazil (Pro-Música Brasil)	Platinum	60,000^{‡}
Denmark (IFPI Danmark)	Gold	45,000^{‡}
Germany (BVMI)	Gold	300,000^{‡}
Italy (FIMI)	Gold	25,000^{‡}
New Zealand (RMNZ)	2× Platinum	60,000^{‡}
Spain (Promusicae)	Gold	30,000^{‡}
United Kingdom (BPI)	Platinum	600,000^{‡}
United States (RIAA)	Platinum	1,000,000^{‡}
^{‡} Sales+streaming figures based on certification alone.

== In popular culture ==
"Young Folks" has made numerous appearances in media, including in the pilot episode of the television series Gossip Girl, and in advertisements for UK home improvement retailer Homebase from 2009 to 2014, and Google Nest in 2017, in which the product's natural language processing was demonstrated by the phrase "play that hipster song with whistling." It also was part of the tracklist in the video games FIFA 08 and FIFA 23.

German singer Nena covered "Young Folks" together with Oliver Pocher and Stephan Remmler in the German language as "Ich kann nix dafür" ("I'm not responsible for it") for the movie Vollidiot. This version was the 78th best-selling single of 2007 in Germany.

== See also ==
- Whistling#In music
