= Pontus Winnberg =

Swedish record producer, songwriter and musician (born 1975)

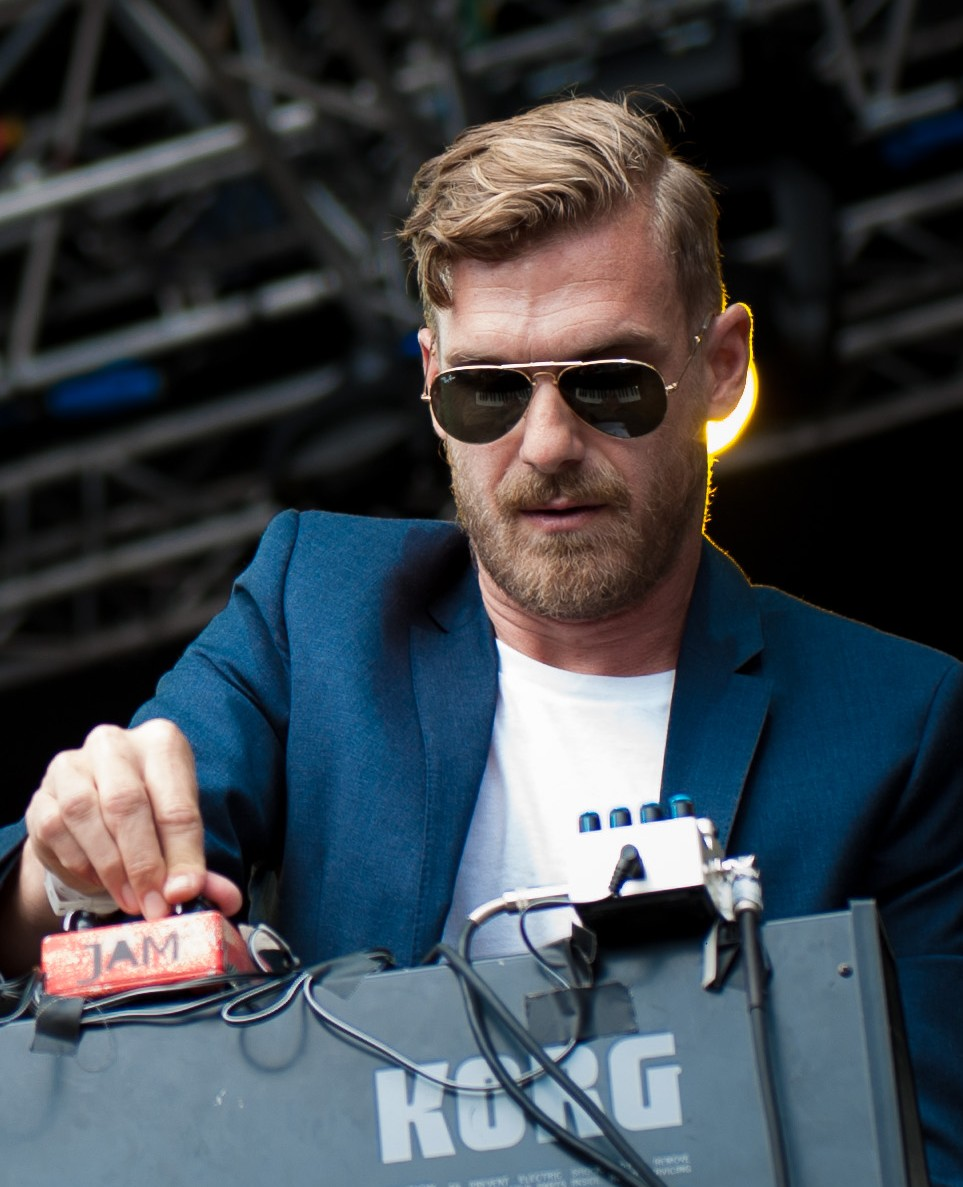
- Winnberg performing with Amason at Way Out West, 2013

Background information
- Born: February 25, 1975 (age 51); Alingsås, Sweden
- Origin: Lerum, Sweden
- Genres: Pop, electronic, indie pop
- Occupations: Record producer, songwriter, musician
- Instruments: Keyboards, piano
- Years active: 2001–present
- Labels: Ingrid, Skolhaus
- Member of: Miike Snow, Amason, Bloodshy & Avant
- Formerly of: Liv

Pontus Winnberg (born 25 February 1975) is a Swedish record producer, songwriter and musician. Under the name Avant he forms the production and songwriting duo Bloodshy & Avant with Christian Karlsson. The duo co-wrote and produced Britney Spears' "Toxic" (2004), which won the Grammy Award for Best Dance Recording, and songs for Madonna, Kylie Minogue and Jennifer Lopez among others.

Winnberg is a member of the bands Miike Snow, with Karlsson and Andrew Wyatt, and Amason, whose albums Sky City and Galaxy I won Grammis awards. Since 2011 he has run Ingrid Studios in Stockholm with Björn Yttling, and he was one of the founders of the Ingrid collective and record label. He also runs the studio and label Skolhaus, and his later writing and production work includes much of Carly Rae Jepsen's album Day and Night (2026).

== Early life ==
Winnberg was born on 25 February 1975 in Alingsås and grew up in Lerum, outside Gothenburg. He started playing the violin at the age of three, and as a child he dreamed of becoming a choir leader or conductor. He grew up with classical music. His father, Lennart Winnberg, taught at the Academy of Music and Drama in Gothenburg, and Winnberg's earliest musical memories are of the Gothenburg Concert Hall, where his father gave pre-concert talks. His interest in pop began when he was about seven. In his youth he played in the Gothenburg band Solomon and ran house clubs. He also attended the jazz programme at the folk high school in Skurup, where Björn Yttling was a fellow student.

== Career ==
=== Bloodshy & Avant ===
Winnberg got to know Karlsson when the latter was a member of the hip hop group Goldmine, but the two did not start working together until some years later. Their first joint work was a remix for Morcheeba, and the first song of their own to become a hit was Christina Milian's "AM to PM" (2001). As Bloodshy and Avant they went on to write and produce for artists including Jennifer Lopez, Kylie Minogue and Britney Spears, as well as Madonna. Around 2001 Winnberg moved to Stockholm, where the duo worked in a studio in Bergshamra. During these years they were part of the Stockholm production company Murlyn Music. They later set up their own studio, Robotberget, on Södermalm.

Their breakthrough came with "Toxic" in 2004, which they wrote with Cathy Dennis and Henrik Jonback. The song topped the UK Singles Chart, and it won the duo the Grammy Award for Best Dance Recording in 2005. The duo were not at the ceremony but on holiday in Asia, and the award was accepted by the mix engineer Niklas Flyckt. The same year the song received the Ivor Novello Award for PRS Most Performed Work, and in 2007 the duo received the Swedish Government's Music Export Prize. The collaboration with Spears continued for several years, including "Piece of Me" (2007). In 2010 the duo produced Sky Ferreira's debut single "One", which they wrote with her and Marit Bergman.

=== Miike Snow ===
Karlsson and Winnberg had met the American singer and songwriter Andrew Wyatt some years earlier, and in 2007 the three formed Miike Snow. The debut album Miike Snow (2009) was written and recorded in three weeks at the duo's new studio, a converted fire station. The band then toured for close to two years, playing around 300 shows, and released Happy to You in 2012. In the band Winnberg is a keyboardist and producer. For the 2012 tour the band had a three-by-three-metre synthesiser built, which Winnberg and Karlsson played from either side. After iii (2016) the band released no new music for eight years, returning in 2024 with the single "I Was a Sailor". In 2026 they released "Ingrid the Sailor" together with Yttling Jazz.

=== Amason ===
In December 2012 Winnberg formed the band Amason with Amanda Bergman, his brother Petter Winnberg, Nils Törnqvist and Gustav Ejstes. The debut album Sky City (2015) won the Grammis for Album of the Year, and Galaxy I (2019) won the Grammis for Alternative Pop of the Year. Winnberg plays piano in the band, and the debut album was made at Ingrid. He is also one of the band's songwriters and has been nominated for the Grammis for Composer of the Year for both Sky City and Galaxy I. According to Winnberg, the band started with his wish to get Amanda Bergman, whom he had heard under the name Hajen, to release music, and Gustav Ejstes joined after playing flute on a Miike Snow recording.

=== Ingrid Studios and the Ingrid collective ===
In 2011 Winnberg and Björn Yttling took over the former KMH studio at Bysistorget on Södermalm and renamed it Ingrid. The studio had housed Polar Studios since 2008. The following year he was one of the thirteen musicians who founded the collective and record label Ingrid, together with Lykke Li, Peter Bjorn and John and the other members of Miike Snow among others. During the first years he, Yttling and the producer Nille Perned also ran the smaller studio Spegeln in the former Spegelteatern theatre. When Miike Snow was on hiatus in the mid-2010s, Winnberg spent his time producing and running Ingrid. In 2021 Yttling and Winnberg started the podcast Back to the Music with Ingrid with the musician Sarah Snavely.

=== Other work ===
In 2016 he, Andrew Wyatt, Lykke Li, Björn Yttling and the producer Jeff Bhasker formed the group Liv, which released the single "Wings of Love". He also has his own studio and label, Skolhaus, in the countryside outside Mariefred, where he has produced Deportees and Esther among others. In 2024 Skolhaus released Alba August's EP Alice, which he wrote and produced with her. Alongside the bands Winnberg has continued to write and produce for others. With Patrik Berger he wrote and produced Carly Rae Jepsen's "For Sure" (2019), and with his brother Petter he made Ásgeir's "Until Daybreak" (2020). At a songwriting camp in Stockholm in 2024 he, Berger, Magnus Lidehäll and Vincent Pontare wrote most of Jepsen's album Day and Night, released in 2026. Winnberg is also a part-owner of the Stockholm instrument maker Teenage Engineering.

== Personal life ==
Winnberg is in a relationship with the actress Alba August.

== Selected songwriting credits ==
Songs on which Winnberg is credited as a writer or co-writer, as Pontus Winnberg or as Avant.

- 2001 – Christina Milian – "AM to PM"
- 2002 – Samantha Mumba – "I'm Right Here"
- 2002 – Ms. Dynamite – "Put Him Out"
- 2003 – Rachel Stevens – "Sweet Dreams My L.A. Ex"
- 2003 – Britney Spears – "Toxic" and "Showdown"
- 2004 – Britney Spears – "Do Somethin'" and "I've Just Begun (Having My Fun)"
- 2005 – Britney Spears – "Chaotic" (theme from Britney & Kevin: Chaotic)
- 2005 – Madonna – "How High" and "Like It or Not"
- 2005 – Rob Thomas – "This Is How a Heart Breaks"
- 2006 – Kelis featuring Spragga Benz – "Fire" (credited as Bloodshy & Avant)
- 2007 – Britney Spears – "Piece of Me", "Radar", "Freakshow" and "Toy Soldier"
- 2007 – Jennifer Lopez – "Brave"
- 2007 – Jordin Sparks – "Shy Boy" and "Young and in Love"
- 2007 – Kylie Minogue – "Speakerphone" and "Nu-di-ty"
- 2007 – Haley Bennett – "Buddha's Delight" (from Music and Lyrics)
- 2008 – Britney Spears – "Unusual You"
- 2009 – Miike Snow – "Animal", "Silvia" and "Black & Blue"
- 2010 – Sky Ferreira – "One"
- 2011 – Britney Spears – "How I Roll" and "Trip to Your Heart"
- 2012 – Miike Snow – "Paddling Out" and "The Wave"
- 2014 – Charli XCX – "Die Tonight"
- 2016 – Miike Snow – "Genghis Khan", "Heart Is Full" and "My Trigger"
- 2019 – Carly Rae Jepsen – "For Sure"
- 2020 – Carly Rae Jepsen – "Let's Sort the Whole Thing Out" and "Now I Don't Hate California After All"
- 2020 – Ásgeir – "Until Daybreak"
- 2024 – Empire of the Sun – "Changes"
- 2026 – Carly Rae Jepsen – "Burning Heart", "Amalfi Coast" and "Blue Skies"

== Awards and nominations ==
Awards and nominations received by Pontus Winnberg
Year	Award	Category	Nominated work	Result	Ref.
2004	Swedish Music Publishers' Award	Biggest International Success of the Year	"Toxic" (with Christian Karlsson and Henrik Jonback)	Won	
2005	Grammy Awards	Best Dance Recording	"Toxic" (as producer, with Karlsson)	Won	
2005	Ivor Novello Awards	PRS Most Performed Work	"Toxic"	Won	
2005	ASCAP Pop Music Awards	Most Performed Songs	"Toxic"	Won	
2007	Music Export Prize	—N/a	Bloodshy & Avant (with Karlsson)	Won	
2010	Grammis	Producer of the Year	Miike Snow (with Karlsson)	Nominated	
2016	Grammis	Album of the Year	Sky City (with Amason)	Won	
2016	Grammis	Composer of the Year and Lyricist of the Year	Sky City (with Amason)	Nominated	
2016	Manifest	Pop of the Year	Sky City (with Amason)	Won	
2020	Grammis	Alternative Pop of the Year	Galaxy I (with Amason)	Won	
2020	Grammis	Composer of the Year	Galaxy I (with Amason)	Nominated	
