= Nothing to Worry About =

Single by Peter Bjorn and John

from the album Living Thing
- Released: 2009
- Genre: Indie rock; indie pop; alternative dance; synth pop
- Length: 3:05
- Label: Wichita
- Songwriter(s): Peter Bjorn and John

Peter Bjorn and John singles chronology
| "Objects of My Affection" (2007) | "Nothing to Worry About" (2009) | "Lay It Down" (2009) |

"Nothing to Worry About" is the first single by Peter Bjorn and John from the album Living Thing. The music video premiered in 2009. The song was featured in a season five episode of the MTV series The Hills entitled "Crazy In Love". The song was featured in commercials for the fifth season of It's Always Sunny in Philadelphia, Cinemax HD in its spring 2009 ad campaign, and EA Sports game, FIFA 10. A remix of the song was also used in the promo for season five of the TV series Bones.

== Music video ==
The video was directed by Andreas Nilsson, and it features the Japanese Rockabilly subculture. The video begins with the Black Shadow's boss in his apartment preparing his exaggerated ducktail hairdo and going out. The rest of the video shows him and his rockabilly gang dancing in Yoyogi Park in Harajuku and ends with a man trying to start his motorcycle, only to realize the engine is shot. The band does not appear in the video.
