= Anders Wendin =

Swedish rock musician (born 1975)

Moneybrother
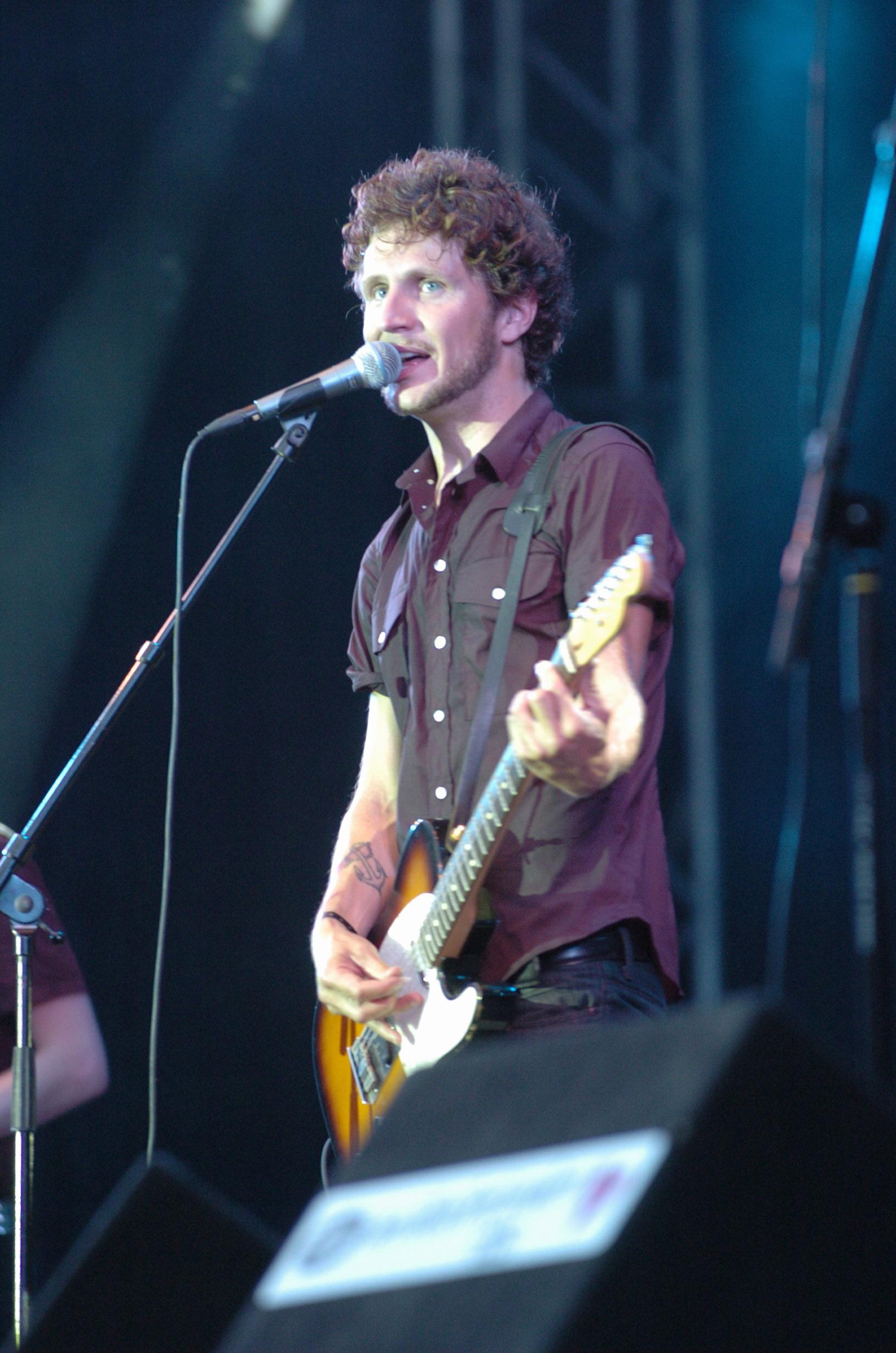
- Wendin performing as Moneybrother at the Arvika festival 2005

Background information
- Born: Anders Olof Wendin; 16 March 1975 (age 51); Norrtälje, Sweden
- Origin: Ludvika, Sweden
- Genres: Rock, soul, reggae
- Occupations: Musician, songwriter
- Instruments: Vocals, guitar
- Formerly of: Monster

Anders Olof Wendin (born 16 March 1975, Norrtälje, Sweden) is a Swedish rock musician, best known for his solo project Moneybrother.

== Career ==
After the split-up of his ska-punk band Monster, Wendin took a new direction and released Moneybrother's debut album Blood Panic in 2003. His second album, To Die Alone, was released in 2005. The music of Moneybrother can be described as a soul-oriented blend, incorporating influences from rock, reggae and disco. In December 2006, Moneybrother released his third album, Pengabrorsan. The title is a literal Swedish translation of Moneybrother, and the album is his first in the Swedish language. It consists of cover versions of English songs, translated into Swedish. August 2007 saw the release of his fourth album Mount Pleasure, which debuted at number one on the Swedish album chart.

In 2017, Wendin participated in the eighth season of the Swedish reality TV-show Så mycket bättre.

== Backing band ==
=== Current members ===
- Patrick Andersson – guitar, bass, backing vocals
- Sylvester Schlegel – drums
- Alexander Pierre - guitar, backing vocals
- Patrik Kolar – organ, piano, backing vocals
- Viktor Brobacke – trombone, backing vocals

=== Former members ===
- Indy Neidell – organ, piano
- Magnus Henriksson – drums, percussion
- August Berg – drums
- Henrik Svensson – guitar
- Henrik Nilsson – bass
- Gustav Bendt – saxophone, backing vocals

== Discography ==
=== Albums ===
- Blood Panic (2003)
- To Die Alone (2005)
- They're Building Walls Around Us (2005)
- Pengabrorsan (2006)
- Mount Pleasure (2007)
- Real Control (2009)
- This Is Where Life Is (2012)

=== EPs ===
- Thunder in My Heart (2002)

=== Singles ===
- It's Been Hurting All the Way With You, Joanna (2003)
- They're Building Walls Around Us (2005)
- Blow Him Back Into My Arms (2005)
- My Lil Girl's Straight From Heaven (2005)
- Dom vet ingenting om oss (2006)
- Downtown Train (Tåget som går in till stan) (2007)
- Just Another Summer (2007)
- Guess Who's Gonna Get Some Tonight (2007)
- Down At The R (2007)
- Born Under a Bad Sign (2009)

=== Compilation ===
- Rebell 10 år (2004)
