= Peter Bjorn and John =

Swedish indie pop/rock band

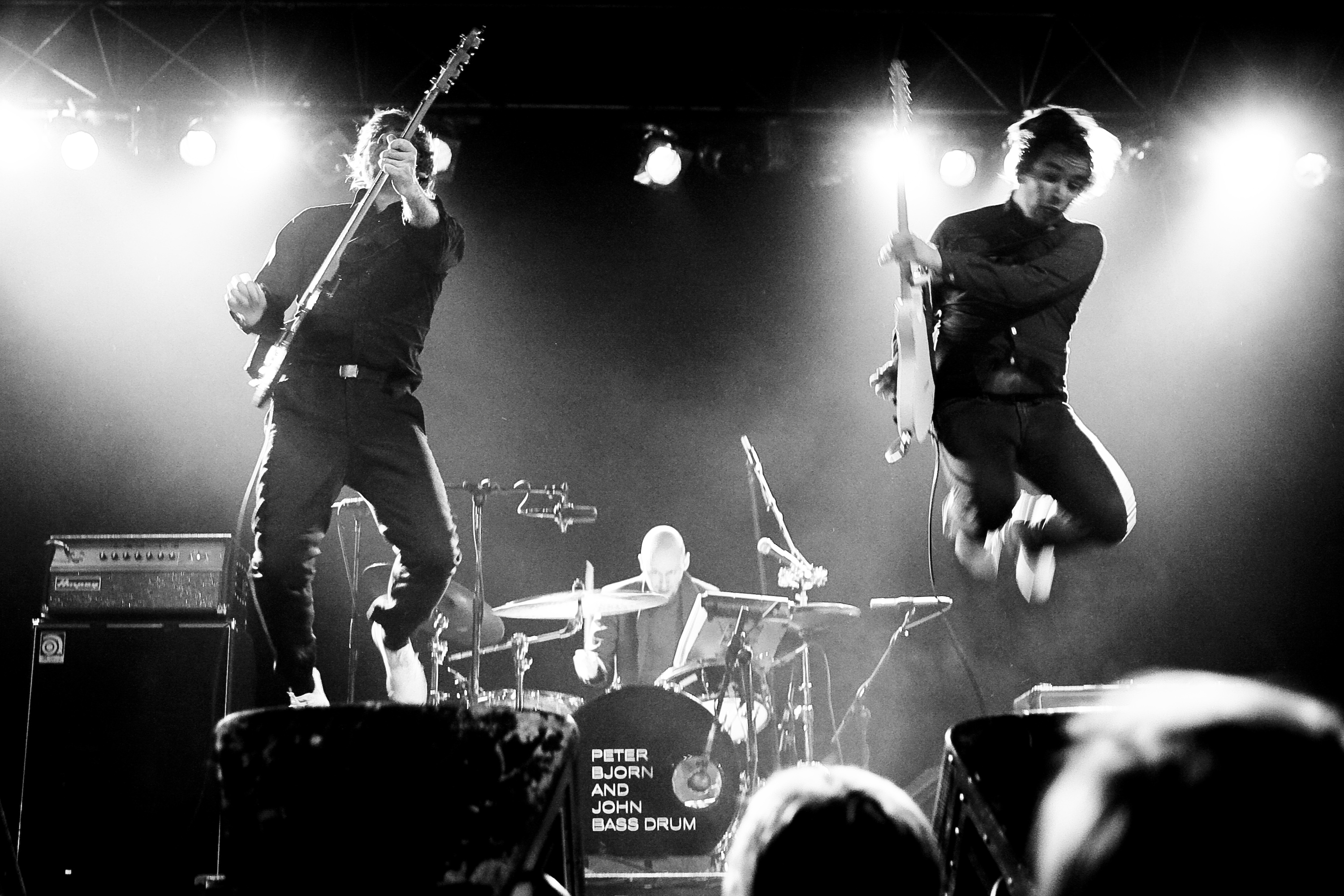
- Peter Bjorn and John performing in 2007

Background information
- Also known as: P, B & J PBJ
- Origin: Stockholm, Sweden
- Genres: Indie pop; indie rock; neo-psychedelia; psychedelic rock
- Years active: 1999–present
- Labels: INGRID; Warner Sweden; Kobalt Label Services; Wichita Recordings
- Members: Peter Morén; Björn Yttling; John Eriksson
- Website: peterbjornandjohn.com

Peter Bjorn and John are a Swedish rock band formed in Stockholm in 1999, named after the first names of the band's members: Peter Morén (vocals, guitar, harmonica), Björn Yttling (bass, keyboards, vocals) and John Eriksson, known in his solo work as Hortlax Cobra (drums, percussion, vocals). Yttling also worked as producer for the band's first four albums.

Their 2006 single "Young Folks", which featured Victoria Bergsman, formerly of the Concretes, was a top 20 hit in the UK Singles Chart, and was featured in the football video game FIFA 08, the baseball video game MLB 2K13, the singing game Lips, as the school project in the film Bandslam, as part of the soundtrack of sitcom How I Met Your Mother, the opening track in the pilot episode of Gossip Girl, the theme tune to British television adverts for Homebase store, and in the Air New Zealand "Safety Safari" surfing video. It was also named NME's second-best track of 2006, beaten by "Over and Over" by Hot Chip. In Australia, it was voted number 16 in the annual Triple J Hottest 100 for 2006. In recent years, Lars Skoglund of the band Laakso has filled in for Eriksson on drums and played bongos during some live shows since the latter developed tinnitus, and incurred a shoulder injury on the tour for 2011's Gimme Some.

== History ==
=== Formation: 1997–2000 ===
Morén and Yttling began playing music with each other while in school. They shared an interest in bands such as The Stone Roses and Ride, and would draw inspiration from acts they heard on the radio while growing up, including Depeche Mode, Fleetwood Mac and OMD. They are also influenced by, but not interested in replicating, classic '60s baroque pop, power pop and new wave. Their first band Piggy In The Middle released the album Images & Distorted Facts in 1997 before disbanding after Morén and Yttling moved to Stockholm, whereupon they met Eriksson in 1999. Their first gig as Peter Bjorn and John was an unsuccessful one aboard a boat in Stockholm; their expectations were not high from the start, as they "just wanted to make good music for [their] own amusement".

=== First years: 2001–2005 ===
After releasing the Forbidden Chords EP and the singles "Failing and Passing" and "I Don't Know What I Want Us to Do", the band released its self-titled first album in 2002 on the tiny Beat That! label. After more shows, the EPs People They Know and 100m of Hurdles, and the "See Through" single, the group jumped to the Planekonomi label in 2004 and released the Beats, Traps, and Backgrounds EP. It was soon followed by the 2004 album Falling Out, which was picked up for American release by Hidden Adenda in late 2005.

=== Mainstream success: 2006–2011 ===
The band's third album, Writer's Block (2006), became a minor international hit. The video to their song "Young Folks" was animated and directed by Ted Malmros of the Swedish indie pop band Shout Out Louds.

After completing various tours in support of Writer's Block, the band focused on other projects before coming together to record and release a largely instrumental album, Seaside Rock, in the autumn of 2008. Living Thing, the band's darker, more experimental fourth full-length album, was released several months later in early 2009. Peter Bjorn and John played Lollapalooza 2009 in Chicago. In 2011, Peter Bjorn and John returned to their melodic pop roots with the decidedly more accessible Gimme Some. The band also opened up for Depeche Mode during their Tour of the Universe. Gimme Some's second single "Second Chance" is heard prominently in advertising for the American light beer Bud Light and as the theme song for the CBS sitcom 2 Broke Girls.

=== Recent years: 2012–present ===
The three band members are founding members of the Swedish artist collective and record label INGRID, founded in 2012; the collective's first compilation, Ingrid Volym 1, was released on Record Store Day 2012.

In March 2014, the band revealed that work had commenced on their seventh album, but that they had been beset with creative setbacks.

In April 2015, they released their first new music in four years, the one-off single "High Up (Take Me to the Top)", on INGRID Volym 2, a Record Store Day-exclusive double-LP, limited to 500 copies. In July 2015, the band debuted two new songs on NPR.

On 11 March 2016, they announced their forthcoming LP, Breakin' Point, along with the promotional single "What You Talking About?", which Rolling Stone called "an infectious slice of synth-heavy indie pop." The album was released on 10 June 2016. Bearing the same name as the album, the album's first lead single "Breakin' Point" was released on 24 March 2016, after being premiered by Zane Lowe on Apple's Beats 1 Radio as the World Record.

In August 2018, the band announced the upcoming release of their eighth album, Darker Days, which was released on 19 October 2018.

On 22 February 2019, the band released EPBJ, a follow-up EP to Darker Days, featuring three new songs recorded during the Darker Days sessions that "showcase a softer and more introspective side of the band." The band also released audio of a live, three-song studio session recorded at Ingrid Studios in Stockholm.

On 18 October 2019, the band announced their ninth studio album, Endless Dream, and released the single "Rusty Nail". The album was released on 13 March 2020.

== Collaborations and solo work ==
Peter, Bjorn and John also collaborated with Canadian-born actor and rapper Drake on his 2009 mixtape, So Far Gone, on the song "Let's Call It Off." Many rappers like Wale, GZA and 88-Keys collaborated on Re-Living Thing, a remix album of Living Thing, released on 8 September 2009 by Mick Boogie.

Peter Morén has released four solo albums and one as a duo. On 8 April 2008, he released a solo album in English, The Last Tycoon, on the Wichita Recordings and Quarterstick Records labels. In 2010, he released a solo album in Swedish, I Spåren Av Tåren. In 2012, he released the more political Pyramiden, influenced by modern indie, new wave, and the formation of the artistic collective INGRID, of which he is a founding member. He released his fourth solo album, 40, in 2017. In 2019, he released a collaborative album with Swedish pop songwriter David Shutrick called En Åldrande Befolkning, which was released first as an EP, then later expanded to album-length and re-released as a LP later that year.

Björn Yttling has previously worked on jazz music, and as a member of INGRID, he has collaborated in bands such as Smile, as well as pursuing his solo work as Yttling Jazz. Yttling Jazz released the album Oh Lord, Why Can't I Keep My Big Mouth Shut in 2005 and returned in 2025 with Illegal Hit, which won the Grammis for jazz of the year in 2026.

John Eriksson, having previously released three EPs under the name Hortlax Cobra, has continued to work under that name, releasing experimental electronic music. A member of INGRID, his first album, Night Shift, was released on the collective's record label in 2012. His second album, 1984, was released in 2012. In 2017, he released his third album Lightworks. He is also a member of the INGRID project Starlight Serenaders.

The group collaborated with producer Claptone, providing vocals on the track "Puppet Theatre". The song is the first single from the album Charmer, released in October 2015.

== Members ==
- Peter Morén - lead vocals, guitar, harmonica
- Björn Yttling - bass, keyboards, percussion, vocals
- John Eriksson - drums, percussion, vocals

== Discography ==
=== Albums ===
List of studio albums, with selected chart positions, sales figures and certifications
Title	Album details	Peak chart positions						
Title	Album details	SWE	BEL (FL)	CAN	IRL	UK	US Indie	US
Peter Bjorn and John	Label: Beat That!; Released: 20 November 2002; Formats: LP, CD, download	—	—	—	—	—	—	—
Falling Out	Label: Planekonomi, Hidden Agenda; Released: 4 October 2004; Formats: CD, download	—	—	—	—	—	—	—
Writer's Block	Label: Wichita, Startime; Released: 14 August 2006; Formats: LP, CD, download	—	90	50	26	68	14	155
Seaside Rock	Label: Almost Gold, Startime; Released: 23 September 2008; Formats: LP, CD, download	—	—	—	—	—	—	—
Living Thing	Label: Wichita, Startime; Released: 30 March 2009; Formats: LP, CD, download	—	—	73	—	162	7	92
Gimme Some	Label: Cooking Vinyl, Startime; Released: 28 March 2011; Formats: LP, CD, download	49	—	—	—	—	20	109
Breakin' Point	Label: Ingrid, Warner Sweden and Kobalt Label Services; Released: 10 June 2016; Formats: LP, CD, download	—	—	—	—	—	—	—
Darker Days	Label: Ingrid; Released: 19 October 2018; Formats: LP, CD, download	—	—	—	—	—	—	—
Endless Dream	Label: Ingrid; Released: 13 March 2020; Formats: LP, download	—	—	—	—	—	—	—
"—" denotes a recording that did not chart or was not released in that territory.

=== EPs ===
Year	EP	Peak chart positions
Year	EP	SWE
2001	Forbidden Chords	—
2003	100 m of Hurdles	—
2003	(I Just Wanna) See Through/Say Something Else (with Spearmint)	—
2004	Beats Traps and Backgrounds	45
2006	Young Folks The Remixes	—
2009	It Don't Move Me	—
2016	Dominos	—
2019	EPBJ	—
2019	INGRID Live Session	—
2020	Endless Play	—

=== Singles ===
Year	Song	Peak chart positions													Album
Year	Song	AUS	BEL (FL)	BEL (WA)	CAN	FIN	GER	IRE	JPN	NED	UK	US	US Alt	US Dance	Album
2002	"Failing and Passing"	—	—	—	—	—	—	—	—	—	—	—	—	—	Peter Bjorn and John
2002	"I Don't Know What I Want Us To Do"	—	—	—	—	—	—	—	—	—	—	—	—	—	Peter Bjorn and John
2003	"People They Know"	—	—	—	—	—	—	—	—	—	—	—	—	—	Peter Bjorn and John
2005	"Teen Love"	—	—	—	—	—	—	—	—	—	—	—	—	—	Falling Out
2005	"Tailormade"	—	—	—	—	—	—	—	—	—	—	—	—	—	Falling Out
2006	"Young Folks"	42	52	57	27	9	31	24	—	75	13	110^{[A]}	22	19	Writer's Block
2006	"Let's Call It Off"	—	—	—	—	—	—	—	—	—	130	—	—	—	Writer's Block
2007	"Objects of My Affection"	—	—	—	—	—	—	—	—	—	—	—	—	—	Writer's Block
2009	"Nothing to Worry About"	—	—	—	—	—	—	—	32	—	139	—	—	—	Living Thing
2009	"Lay It Down"	—	—	—	—	—	—	—	—	—	—	—	—	—	Living Thing
2009	"It Don't Move Me"	—	—	—	—	—	—	—	—	—	—	—^{[B]}	—	10	Living Thing
2011	"Breaker Breaker"	—	—	—	—	—	—	—	—	—	—	—	—	—	Gimme Some
2011	"Second Chance"	—	—	—	—	—	—	—	—	—	—	—	—	—	Gimme Some
2011	"Dig a Little Deeper" / "What I Could Do If I Wanted To"	—	—	—	—	—	—	—	—	—	—	—	—	—	Gimme Some
2011	"May Seem Macabre"	—	—	—	—	—	—	—	—	—	—	—	—	—	Gimme Some
2016	"What You Talking About"	—	—^{[C]}	—	—	—	—	—	—	—	—	—	—	—	Breakin' Point
2016	"Breakin' Point"	—	—	—^{[D]}	—	—	—	—	—	—	—	—	—	—	Breakin' Point
2018	"One For The Team"	x													Darker Days
2018	"Gut Feeling"	x													Darker Days
2018	"Every Other Night"	x													Darker Days
2018	"Wrapped Around The Axle"	x													Darker Days
2019	"Rusty Nail"	x													Endless Dream
"—" denotes a release that did not chart.

==== Other charting songs ====
Year	Song	US Rock	Album
2011	"Eyes"	48	Gimme Some
"—" denotes singles that did not chart, have not charted yet, or were not released.

==== Notes ====
- A. "Young Folks" did not enter the Billboard Hot 100, but peaked at number 10 on the Bubbling Under Hot 100 Singles chart, which acts as a 25-song extension to the Hot 100.
- B. "It Don't Move Me" did not enter the Billboard Hot 100, but peaked at number 24 on the Hot Singles Sales chart.
- C. "What You Talking About?" did not enter the Ultratop chart, but entered the Ultratop "extra tips" chart.
- D. "Breakin' Point" did not enter the Ultratop chart, but entered the Ultratop "extra tips" chart.

=== Other contributions ===
- Acoustic 07 (2007, V2 Records)
