= Seaside Rock =

Studio album by Peter Bjorn and John
- Released: 23 September 2008
- Recorded: Spring 2007
- Genre: Indie pop, experimental rock, shoegaze
- Length: 40:52
- Label: Almost Gold/Star Time International

Peter Bjorn and John chronology
Writer's Block (2006)	Seaside Rock (2008)	Living Thing (2009)

Professional ratings
Review scores
Source	Rating
The Observer	4/5 stars
Pitchfork	(6.3/10)
The Skinny	3/5 stars
This Is Fake DIY	(8/10)
Uncut	4/5 stars

Seaside Rock is the fourth album by Peter Bjorn and John. A vinyl- and digital- only release, it came out in the U.S. on Almost Gold/Star Time International on 23 September 2008. The U.S. edition is limited to 5000 LPs, each accompanied by a download code. (V2 released the album in the trio's native Sweden, while Wichita handled it in the UK.) Seaside Rock is an experimental, almost completely instrumental album; aside from some vocals in 'Say Something', the only other vocals appearing on the album are Swedish, spoken word pieces performed over backing music by Peter Bjorn And John read by people in their local community, such as a nearby hairdresser. The album was included in CD form in the deluxe edition of their 2009 album Living Thing.

== Track listing ==
1. "Inland Empire" – 4:23
2. "Say Something (Mukiya)" – 3:18
3. "Favour of the Season" – 3:19
4. "Next Stop Bjursele" (spoken word) – 4:01
5. "School of Kraut" – 2:56
6. "Erik's Fishing Trip" (spoken word) – 3:57
7. "Needles and Pills" – 5:11
8. "Norrlands Riviera" (spoken word) – 4:54
9. "Barcelona" – 5:22
10. "At the Seaside" – 3:31
