= Breakin' Point =

Studio album by Peter Bjorn and John
- Released: 10 June 2016
- Genres: Indie pop, indie rock
- Length: 40:54
- Labels: PBJ Music AB, INGRID, Warner Sweden and Kobalt Label Services
- Producers: Emile Haynie, Greg Kurstin, Patrik Berger, Paul Epworth, Peter Bjorn and John, Pontus Winnberg, Thom Monahan

Peter Bjorn and John chronology
Gimme Some (2011)	Breakin' Point (2016)	Darker Days (2018)

Singles from Breakin' Point
- 1. "What You Talking About?" Released: 11 March 2016; 2. "Breakin' Point" Released: 25 March 2016; 3. "Dominos" Released: 13 May 2016

Professional ratings
Aggregate scores
Source	Rating
Metacritic	66/100
Review scores
Source	Rating

Breakin' Point is the seventh album by Peter Bjorn and John. It was released on 10 June 2016. An earlier version of the bonus track "High Up" was released on the Volym 2 compilation album by the label INGRID in 2015.

== Track listing ==
No.	Title	Length
1.	"Dominos"	3:16
2.	"Love Is What You Want"	3:52
3.	"Do-Si-Do"	3:46
4.	"What You Talking About?"	2:59
5.	"Breakin' Point"	3:29
6.	"A Long Goodbye"	3:45
7.	"Nostalgic Intellect"	3:54
8.	"In This Town"	3:31
9.	"Hard Sleep"	3:14
10.	"It's Your Call"	2:44
11.	"Between The Lines"	3:02
12.	"Pretty Dumb, Pretty Lame"	3:22

Deluxe edition bonus tracks
No.	Title	Length
13.	"Bad Taste"	2:52
14.	"Stuck"	3:42
15.	"Spoken Word"	5:23

Deluxe edition bonus demos
No.	Title	Length
1.	"High Up"	2:59
2.	"What You Talking About?" (demo version)	3:47
3.	"It's Your Call" (demo version)	2:57
4.	"A Long Goodbye" (demo version)	3:31
5.	"Breakin' Point" (demo version)	3:34
