= John Eriksson (musician) =

Swedish musician (born 1974)

- Born: 8 January 1974 (age 52); Hortlax (Piteå), Sweden
- Occupations: Musician and composer
- Years active: 1994–present
- Known for: Founding member of Peter Bjorn and John

John Eriksson (born 8 January 1974, Hortlax (Piteå), Sweden) is a Swedish musician and composer best known as a founding member of Peter Bjorn and John.

== Career ==
He was born in 1974 and raised in Hortlax (Piteå), Sweden. In 1994, he founded the percussion quartet Peaux, for which he was also a musician and composer. From 1995 to 1999, he was a musician in the Swedish Radio Symphony Orchestra, performing in concerts and recordings with Esa-Pekka Salonen, Myung-Whun Chung, Herbert Blomstedt and Evgeny Svetlanov. He was also in a percussion/trumpet duo with Tora Thorslund, and in 1998 he was a marimba soloist during the Stockholm International Percussion Event. From 1999 to 2008, he was a musician, arranger and composer in the Kroumata Percussion Ensemble.

From 1999, he was one of the founding members, musician, composer, arranger and producer of the band Peter Bjorn and John. More recently, he has recorded as dance music act Hortlax Cobra, who produced 3 vinyl EPs. Another side project is "disco-kraut" act Holiday For Strings. He was also composer for projects with Teenage Engineering. In 2012 he was one of the founding members of the artist collective INGRID, and Hortlax Cobra contributed a song to their Record Store Day compilation called Ingrid Volume 1.

== Discography ==
=== As composer, arranger ===
- Peter Bjorn And John: Gimme Some
- Peter Bjorn And John: Living Thing (also producer)
- Peter Bjorn And John: Seaside Rock (also producer)
- Peter Bjorn And John: Writers Block
- Peter Bjorn And John: Falling Out
- Peter Bjorn And John: Peter Bjorn And John
- Peter Bjorn And John: Beats Traps and Backgrounds (EP)
- Hortlax Cobra: Night Shift (also producer)
- Hortlax Cobra: Everybody's Talking About Hortlax Cobra (also producer)
- Hortlax Cobra: Nobody Knows Hortlax Cobra (also producer)
- Hortlax Cobra: Stop and Smell the Hortlax Cobra (also producer)
- Holiday For Strings: CD
- Holiday For Strings: Two Of You (EP)
- Holiday For Strings: Favorite Flavor
- Peaux – Peaux
- Kroumata – Encores
- Depeche Mode – Fragile Tension (remix)
- First Floor Power – The Jacket (remix)
- Golden Filter – Hide Me (remix)
- The Temper Trap – Fools (remix)
- Peter Bjorn And John: Writers Block Remix (remix)
- Wildbirds and Peacedrums – My Heart (remix)
- Les Big Byrd – Zig Smile (remix)
- Neneh Cherry and The Thing: Accordion (remix)

=== As Musician: (excerpts) ===
- Lykke Li: Youth Novels
- Lykke Li: Wounded Rhymes
- Teddybears: Musik ur teaterföreställningen Don Carlos
- Magnus Granberg & Skogen – Ist Gefallen In Den Schnee
- Fibes Oh Fibes: Album
- Hans-Erik Dyvik Husby: I ljuset av Cornelis
- Shout Out Louds – Our Ill Wills
- Shout Out Louds – Oh, Sweetheart E.P.
- Taken By Trees – Open Field
- Sahara Hotnights – What if leaving is a loving thing
- Existensminimum – Last night my head tried to explode and i wrote everything down
- Monty's Loco – Man Overboard
- Marit Bergman – I think it's a rainbow
- Moneybrother – To die Alone
- Deportees – Damage Goods
- Sarah Blasko – As day follows night
- Smile – A flash in the night
- Smile – Satellite Blues (Vinyl Single)
- Nicolai Dunger – A Dress Book
- Nicolai Dunger – Here's my song
- Nicolai Dunger – Sjunger Edith Södergran
- The Concretes – In Colour
- Yttling Jazz – Oh lord, why can't I keep my big mouth shut
- EP's Trailerpark – L'esperit d'escalier
- Folke – Folke
- Kroumata / Lahti Symphony Orchestra: Kalevi Aho – Symphony Nr 11 (Kroumata Symphony)
- Kroumata / Oslo Philharmonic : Rolf Wallin – Act
- André Chini / Kroumata / Norrbottens Kammarorkester – Eallin
- A Spirit's Whisper – selected works by Bo Nilsson
- Swedish Radio Symphony Orchestra / Esa Pekka Salonen: Dallapiccola – Il Prigionerio
- Swedish Radio Symphony Orchestra / Evgeny Svetlanov: Shostakovitj v Symphony Nr 7
- Swedish Radio Symphony Orchestra / Leif Segerstam: Sven-David Sandström-High Mass
- Swedish Radio Symphony Orchestra / Leif Segerstam: Lutoslawski, Penderecki Cello concertos

== Additional sources ==
- Halperin, Shirley (February 22, 2008). "In the Studio: Peter Bjorn and John". Entertainment Weekly.
- Lucas, John (May 17, 2007). "Peter Bjorn and John". Georgia Straight.
- Sterdan, Darryl (April 14, 2009). "No Writer's Block for Peter Bjorn and John". Canoe.ca.
