= Ingrid (record label) =

Swedish record label, artist collective

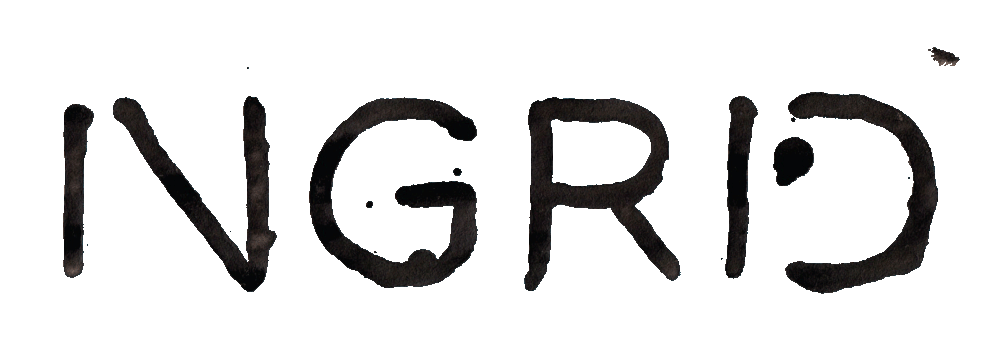
- Founded: 2012
- Founder: Lykke Li; Peter Morén; Björn Yttling; John Eriksson; Andrew Wyatt; Pontus Winnberg; Christian Karlsson; Joakim Åhlund; Coco Morier; Nille Perned; Johanna Beckman; Jonas Torvestig; Tomas Nordmark
- Country of origin: Sweden
- Location: Stockholm
- Official website: ingridstudios.com

Ingrid (stylised in all caps) is a Swedish artist collective and record label based in Stockholm. It was launched in March 2012 by thirteen artists and musicians, among them Lykke Li and the members of Peter Bjorn and John and Miike Snow, and grew out of a recording studio on Södermalm that some of them had taken over the year before.

The label's first release was the compilation Ingrid Volym 1, issued on Record Store Day in 2012. It included several side projects, such as Björn Yttling's Yttling Jazz and the band Smile, with Yttling and Joakim Åhlund of Teddybears. It has since released records by Peter Bjorn and John, Amason and El Perro del Mar, among others. The members kept their existing record deals. The collective has also performed together, including at Way Out West in 2012 and the Roskilde Festival in 2013.

== History ==
Ingrid grew out of a recording studio at Bysistorget on Södermalm in Stockholm, which Björn Yttling, Pontus Winnberg and Nille Perned took over in 2011 and named Ingrid. According to Peter Morén, this was how it began: once the studio had been taken over, friends started talking about doing more together, and the collective and the label grew out of those conversations. The first idea was a record label, but Tomas Nordmark has said that they soon preferred a collective whose members could exchange ideas.

The collective was announced on 20 March 2012. Its statement said that the idea had taken shape over coffee at a café in Stockholm and asked: "Isn't there more to life than world tours, indie cred and empty pockets?" A month later it released its first record, the compilation Ingrid Volym 1, on Record Store Day, and in late April it held a launch show at the Bowery Hotel in New York, where Lykke Li performed a new song.

Tomas Nordmark, one of the founders, grew into the role of label manager during the first year. Niklas Hallberg has held it since 2013.

== Founding members ==
The collective was founded by thirteen artists and musicians, all Scandinavian or American in origin; the founding members are as follows:

- Lykke Li
- Peter Bjorn & John, including solo work by Peter Morén, Björn Yttling and John Eriksson (Eriksson used the pseudonym 'Hortlax Cobra')
- Andrew Wyatt, Pontus Winnberg and Christian Karlsson of the band Miike Snow
- Joakim Åhlund of Teddybears, Caesars and Les Big Byrd.
- Coco Morier
- Nille Perned
- Johanna Beckman
- Jonas Torvestig
- Tomas Nordmark

== Releases ==
2012:

- Various artists – Ingrid Volym 1 (Album)
- Smile – A Flash In The Night (Album)
- Hortlax Cobra – Night Shift (Album)
- Starlight Serenaders – Summer Drones (EP)
- Coco Morier – Strangers May Kiss (EP)
- A Nighthawk – Until I Faltered I Wasn't Free (EP)
- Peter Morén – Pyramiden (Album)
- Peter Morén – Säg mitt namn (Single)
- Peter Morén – Tröstpriset (Single)
- Woodlands – River running wild (Single)
- Woodlands – Woodlands (Album)
- Kriget – Dragons (Single)
- Kriget – Dystopico (Album)
- El Perro Del Mar – Walk On By (El Perro Del Mar song)|Walk On By (Single)
- El Perro Del Mar – Pale Fire (Album) (released in the UK by Memphis Industries)
- El Perro Del Mar – Hold Off the Dawn (Single)
- Little Children – In Hau (EP)
- Hortlax Cobra – 1984 (Album)

2013:

- El Perro Del Mar – I Was a Boy (Single)
- Shadow Shadow – Riviera (Single)
- Shadow Shadow – 1000001 (Single)
- Shadow Shadow – Riviera (Album)
- Andrew Wyatt – Descender (Album)
- David Lynch – The Big Dream (Album)
- Tussilago – Tussilago (EP)
- David Lynch & Lykke Li – I'm Waiting Here (Single)
- David Lynch – Are You Sure (Single)
- Tussilago – Tussilago (EP)
- Amason – Margins (Single)
- Amason – Went to War (Single)
- Amason – EP (EP)
- Gunwolf – Get Ready To Get Killed (Album)
- The Suzan – Moving on (Single)
- A Nighthawk – Here We Are, Out In the Open (EP)
- Peter Morén – Broken Swenglish Vol. 1 (EP)

2014:

- Yttling Jazz – Oh Lord Why Can't I Keep My Mouth Shut (Re-release)
- Amason – Ålen (Single)
- Lykke Li – Du är den ende (Single)
- Little Majorette & Pontus Winnberg – Wonder (Single)
- Tussilago – Say Hello (Single)
- Max von Sydow – Ugly Girls Ugly Boys (Single)
- Chrissie Hynde – Stockholm (Album)
- David Lynch – The Big Dream Remix EP (EP)
- Chrissie Hynde – Dark Sunglasses (Single)
- Chrissie Hynde – Dark You or No One (Single)
- Xander Duell – Earth On It's Axis (Single)
- Peter Morén – I Spåren Av Tåren (Re-release)
- Peter Morén – Broken Swenglish, Vol. 2 (EP)
- Chrissie Hynde – Down the Wrong Way (Single)
- Chrissie Hynde – Adding the Blue (Single)
- Amason – Duvan (Single)

2015:

- Amason – Sky City (Album)
- Amason – Kelly (Singe)
- Dolores Haze – I Got My Gun (Single)
- Tussilago – My Own Dear (Single)
- Ingrid – Volym 2 (Album)
- Tussilago – Holy Train (Album)
- Amason – Yellow Moon (Single)
- Chris Olsson – Thin Love (Single)
- Hortlax Cobra – I'm Still Here / Night Still Young (Single)
- Astropol – The Sound Of A Heart That Breaks (Single)
- Xander Duell – Wade Laiste (Album)
- Amason – Spotify Sessions (Album)
- Astropol – Just Before Our Love Got Lost (Single)
- Vulkano – Smiley Faces (Single)
- Vulkano – Iridescence (Album)

2016:

- Amanda Bergman – "Docks"
- MishCatt – "EP" (EP)
- Amason – "California Dreamin' EP" (EP)
- Peter Bjorn and John – "Breakin' Point"
- liv – "Wings of Love" (single)
- Amanda Bergman – "Flickering Lights EP"

2017:

- Peter Morén – 40 (Album)
- Hortlax Cobra – Lightworks (Album)

2018:

- Peter Bjorn and John – Darker Days (Album)

2019:

- Amason – Galaxy I (LP)

2020:

- Peter Bjorn and John – Endless Dream (Album)

2021:

- Smile – Phantom Island (Album, with Chimp Limbs)
- Various artists – The Golden Jubilee (EP)

2022:

- Amason – Galaxy II (LP, with Amasonason)

== Live performances ==
Ingrid first performed as a collective at the Way Out West festival in Gothenburg in the summer of 2012, at the club Trädgården. All the founding members took part, with José González as a guest. In the summer of 2013 the collective played the Roskilde Festival, without Joakim Åhlund and Coco Morier but with Chrissie Hynde and the Tallest Man on Earth as guests. Later that summer it returned to Way Out West with the club night Ingrid Disco at Gothenburg Film Studios, alongside acts such as Disclosure, Markus Krunegård, Amason, Tussilago and Zilverzurfarn.

== Studios ==
The collective is based at Ingrid Studios at Bysistorget on Södermalm in Stockholm. The studio opened in 1971 as KMH Studios in a former cinema and housed Polar Studios for some years in the 2000s. Peter Bjorn and John recorded Breakin' Point (2016) there.

In spring 2020 the collective streamed the 36-hour festival 36h Ingrid from the studio. In November 2021 Ingrid released the EP The Golden Jubilee, marking fifty years since the studio opened.

Ingrid also runs a smaller studio, Spegeln, in the former Spegelteatern theatre on Björngårdsgatan, a few blocks away.
