= Gimme Some =

Studio album by Peter Bjorn and John
- Released: 28 March 2011
- Studio: Tambourine Studios (Malmö, Sweden)
- Genre: Indie pop; indie rock; neo-psychedelia
- Length: 37:38
- Label: Cooking Vinyl (UK); Startime (US)
- Producer: Per Sunding

Peter Bjorn and John chronology
Living Thing (2009)	Gimme Some (2011)	Breakin' Point (2016)

Singles from Gimme Some
- 1. "Breaker Breaker" Released: Spring 2011; 2. "Second Chance" Released: Spring 2011; 3. "Dig a Little Deeper / What I Could Do (If I Wanted To)" Released: Record Store Day 2011

Professional ratings
Aggregate scores
Source	Rating
Metacritic	74/100
Review scores
Source	Rating
AllMusic	4/5 stars
Clash	9/10 stars
Pitchfork Media	(6.2/10)
Spin	7/10 stars

Gimme Some is the sixth album by Peter Bjorn and John. It was released on 28 March 2011 in the UK, Europe and the rest of the world on Cooking Vinyl, and the following day in the US, on Startime International.

"Breaker, Breaker", "Second Chance", "Dig a Little Deeper" and "May Seem Macabre" were released as singles, the latter as a radio-only single. "Second Chance", released on 24 January 2011, is perhaps best known as the opening theme of the American television sitcom 2 Broke Girls. The US tour for Gimme Some was notable for being characterized by free food being provided at each show by a catering company local to the city the band were playing at, tying in with some lyrics and themes of the album's main thematic song "Down Like Me". Live performances from this era were characterized by a back-to-basic, punk-like energy that came as a result of an effort by the band to revert to a more stripped-down sound after the electronic, layered compositions of their previous album Living Thing and Re-Living Thing [Not mentioned in chronology]. Three singles were released from the album: "Breaker Breaker", "Second Chance", and "Dig a Little Deeper". "May Seem Macabre" was also promoted for radio circulation. The band also created a music video in collaboration with Pitchfork.TV of the entire album.

== Track listing ==
1. "Tomorrow Has to Wait" – 3:00
2. "Dig a Little Deeper" – 3:52
3. "Second Chance" – 4:15
4. "Eyes" – 2:55
5. "Breaker Breaker" – 1:41
6. "May Seem Macabre" – 4:44
7. "(Don't Let Them) Cool Off" – 2:50
8. "Black Book" – 1:38
9. "Down Like Me" – 3:51
10. "Lies" – 3:13
11. "I Know You Don't Love Me" – 5:38

== Charts ==
Chart performance
Chart (2011)	Peak position
Swedish Albums (Sverigetopplistan)	49
US Billboard 200	109
US Independent Albums (Billboard)	20
US Top Alternative Albums (Billboard)	24
US Top Rock Albums (Billboard)	33
US Top Tastemaker Albums (Billboard)	22
