= Look to the East, Look to the West =

Studio album by Camera Obscura
- Released: 3 May 2024
- Studio: Rockfield (Monmouthshire); Chem19 (Glasgow); Clashnarrow (Helmsdale)
- Genre: Indie pop
- Length: 44:45
- Label: Merge
- Producer: Jari Haapalainen

Camera Obscura chronology
Desire Lines (2013)	Look to the East, Look to the West (2024)

Look to the East, Look to the West is the sixth studio album by the Scottish indie pop band Camera Obscura, released on 3 May 2024 via Merge Records. It is their first album in 11 years and the first since the death of keyboardist and backing vocalist Carey Lander in 2015; Donna Maciocia (formerly a member of Amplifico), who joined the band as a permanent member in 2023, fills out her role. The album is produced by Jari Haapalainen, who previously worked on Let's Get Out of This Country (2006) and My Maudlin Career (2009).

== Background ==
Camera Obscura had not played together since Carey Lander died from cancer in 2015. In 2019, the band played a concert as a part of Belle and Sebastian's Boaty Weekender cruise. The band recruited keyboardist and backing singer Donna Maciocia, who also co-wrote the song "We're Going To Make It In A Man's World.

The album cover features a photo of Fiona Morrison, who also appears on the cover of Camera Obscura's debut album, Biggest Bluest Hi Fi (2001).

== Critical reception ==
Professional ratings
Aggregate scores
Source	Rating
Metacritic	84/100
Review scores
Source	Rating
AllMusic	4/5 stars
Pitchfork	8.0/10
Uncut	8/10

Look to the East, Look to the West was met with "universal acclaim" from critics. At Metacritic, which assigns a weighted average rating out of 100 to reviews from mainstream publications, this release received an average score of 84, based on 10 reviews. Stephen Deusner of Uncut said the album "could have followed right on the heels of 2013's Desire Lines...Tracyanne Campbell still writes exquisite songs."

== Track listing ==
All tracks are written by Tracyanne Campbell except where otherwise noted.

No.	Title	Writer(s)	Length
1.	"Liberty Print"		5:14
2.	"We're Going to Make It in a Man's World"	Tracyanne Campbell and Donna Maciocia	4:17
3.	"Big Love"		2:57
4.	"Only a Dream"		4:24
5.	"The Light Nights"		4:33
6.	"Sleepwalking"		3:40
7.	"Baby Huey (Hard Times)"		3:21
8.	"Denon"		3:34
9.	"Pop Goes Pop"		4:33
10.	"Sugar Almond"		3:42
11.	"Look to the East, Look to the West"		4:26
Total length:			44:45

"Look at the Demos" Bonus EP exclusive from Rough Trade stores
No.	Title	Length
1.	"Baby Huey (Hard Times) (Demo version)"	3:45
2.	"Denon (Demo version)"	3:30
3.	"Liberty Print (Demo version)"	3:46
4.	"Only a Dream (Demo version)"	3:24
5.	"The Light Nights (Demo version)"	4:00
Total length:		18:25

== Personnel ==
Camera Obscura

- Tracyanne Campbell – lead vocals, guitar
- Gavin Dunbar – bass guitar
- Lee Thomson – drums, percussion
- Kenny McKeeve – guitar, percussion, backing vocals
- Donna Maciocia – piano, synthesizer, backing vocals

Additional contributors

- Jari Haapalainen – production, mixing (all tracks); programming (tracks 1, 7), percussion (2, 3, 6, 8, 9)
- Jake Hutton – engineering
- Joe Jones – engineering
- Paul Savage – engineering
- Anne McLeod – oboe (track 11)

== Charts ==
Chart performance for Look to the East, Look to the West
Chart (2024)	Peak position
Scottish Albums (OCC)	4
UK Albums (OCC)	36
UK Independent Albums (OCC)	4
