= Layourbattleaxedown =

Compilation album by The Concretes
- Released: 26 July 2005
- Genre: Indie pop
- Length: 39:09
- Label: Astralwerks 11981
- Producers: The Concretes, Jari Haapalainen

The Concretes chronology
The Concretes (2004)	Layourbattleaxedown (2005)	In Colour (2006)

Professional ratings
Review scores
Source	Rating
AllMusic	3.5/5 stars
Pitchfork	(7.3/10)

Layourbattleaxedown is a compilation album by the Swedish band The Concretes consisting of b-sides and rarities from the British singles and EPs pertaining to their debut release The Concretes, that was released on 26 July 2005 in the United States (see 2005 in music).

This album was chosen as one of Amazon.com's Top 100 Editor's Picks of 2005.

== Track listing ==
All music by The Concretes and lyrics by Victoria Bergsman, except where noted.

1. "Forces" – 3:40
  - from the single Forces
2. "Sugar" – 3:54
  - from the EP Nationalgeographic
3. "Lady December" – 4:42
  - from the EP Warm Night
4. "The Warrior" – 3:33
  - from the EP Warm Night
5. "Miss You" (Mick Jagger, Keith Richards) – 3:50
  - from We Love You compilation tribute to The Rolling Stones
6. "Oh Baby" – 3:59
  - from the EP Nationalgeographic
7. "Sand" – 2:48
  - from the EP Nationalgeographic
8. "Free Ride" – 3:45
  - from the EP Nationalgeographic
9. "Branches" – 4:43
  - from the single Forces
10. "Under Your Leaves" – 3:28
  - from the EP Nationalgeographic
11. "Seems Fine Shuffle" – 2:47
  - from the EP Warm Night
