= Open Field =

Studio album by Taken by Trees
- Released: June 18, 2007 (UK); September 11, 2007 (USA)
- Genre: Indie pop
- Length: 34:25
- Label: Rough Trade (UK); Eleven (US)
- Producer: Björn Yttling and Victoria Bergsman

Taken by Trees chronology
Open Field (2007)	East of Eden (2009)

Professional ratings
Review scores
Source	Rating
Allmusic	link
Pitchfork Media	7.7/10 link
Rockfeedback	link

Open Field is the debut album by the Swedish solo act Taken By Trees. It is the first studio album to be released by Victoria Bergsman after shedding her duties as the lead singer of The Concretes. It was released on June 18, 2007 on Rough Trade Records.

== Track listing ==
All tracks written by Victoria Bergsman except where noted.

1. "Tell Me" – 3:38
2. "Julia" – 4:00
3. "The Legend" – 3:54
4. "Sunshine Lady" – 2:29
5. "Lost & Found" (Tracyanne Campbell) – 2:57
6. "Open Field" (Bergsman and Björn Yttling) – 3:17
7. "Hours Pass Like Centuries" – 1:51
8. "Too Young" – 4:30
9. "Only Yesterday" – 2:38
10. "Cedar Trees" – 5:11

== Personnel ==
=== Performance ===
- Victoria Bergsman – Vocals & various instruments
- Björn Yttling – Bass, piano & guitar
- John Eriksson – Drums, vibraphone, marimba, percussion & synth
- Andreas Söderstrom – Guitar, mandolin & harmonium
- Verity Susman – Piano & backing vocals
- Nils Berg – Flute & synth
- Elle-Kari Larsson – Backing vocals
- Lykke Zachrisson – Backing vocals
- Linda Portnoff – Backing vocals
- Sofia Hogman – Backing vocals
- Rebecka Hjukstrom – Backing vocals
- Louise Holmer – Backing vocals
- Eric Berglund – Zither
- Mikael Andersson – Euphonium
- Per Johansson – Various flutes
- August Berg – Cymbals
- Andreas Forsman – Violin
- Erik Arvinder – Violin
- Erik Holm – Viola
- Anna Dager – Cello

=== Production ===
==== Production ====
Björn Yttling and Victoria Bergsman

==== Recording ====
Janne Hansson at Atlantis Studios

Lasse Mârtén at Decibel Studios

Björn Yttling at Högalid Studio

==== Mixing ====
Lasse Mârtén and Björn Yitling at Decibel Studios

==== String Arrangements ====
Björn Yttling

==== Mastering ====
Henrik Jonsson and Björn Yttling at Masters of Audio

==== Paintings ====
Victoria Bergsman

==== Graphic Design ====
Olov Sundstrom
