= What's the Point =

2010 song by Johnossi

Single by Johnossi

from the album Mavericks
- Released: January 2010
- Studio: Decibel Studios, Stockholm
- Length: 4:13
- Label: Universal Music
- Songwriter(s): John Engelbert; Oskar Bonde
- Producer(s): Lasse Mårtén; Johnossi

Johnossi singles chronology
"Party with My Pain" (2008)	"What's the Point" (2010)	"Dead End" (2010)

"What's the Point" is a song written by John Engelbert and Oskar Bonde and recorded by Swedish rock group, Johnossi. It was released in January 2010 and peaked at number 20 on the Swedish charts.

== Charts ==
=== Weekly charts ===
Chart (2010)	Peak position
Sweden (Sverigetopplistan)	20

=== Year-end charts ===
Chart (2010)	Position
Sweden (Sverigetopplistan)	80

== Darin version ==
"What's the Point"

Single by Darin
- Released: 12 November 2022
- Length: 3:41
- Label: Dex Music
- Songwriter(s): John Engelbert; Oskar Bonde
- Producer(s): Mona Khoshi

Darin singles chronology
"Satisfaction" (2022)	"What's the Point" (2022)	"Starkare" (2023)

In 2022, Darin performed the song on Så mycket bättre and released the song shortly after. In a review of his performance ScandiPop said "[Darin] delivered a turbo-charged synthpop cover of Johnossi's 'What's the Point'. A knock-out interpretation of the song, which is quite likely to go down as one of the all time best for both Darin and the show." Culture Fix said "[Darin delivered] a barnstorming version of Johnossi's What’s The Point. It is fabulous high energy banger that Darin delivers with an impressive gusto with the track shining as a comfortable addition to his every expanding back catalogue."

Darin's version peaked at number 8 on the Swedish charts. It was certified gold in Sweden in February 2023.

=== Charts ===
Chart (2022–2023)	Peak position
Sweden (Sverigetopplistan)	8

=== Certifications ===
Region	Certification	Certified units/sales
Sweden (GLF)	Gold	4,000,000^{†}
^{†} Streaming-only figures based on certification alone.
