= Jari Haapalainen =

Swedish musician (born 1971)

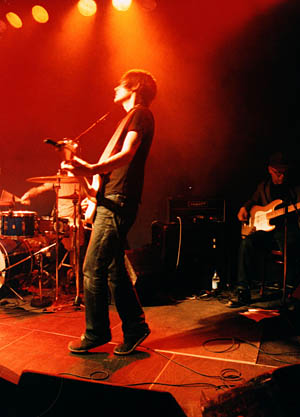
Jari Haapalainen with The Bear Quartet at the Accelerator festival in Stockholm 2003

Jari Heikki Haapalainen (born 1971) is a Swedish musician, songwriter and record producer. He was born to Finnish immigrant parents, and resides in Cairo, Egypt.

== Career ==
Haapalainen played lead guitar and was a founding member of The Bear Quartet. He has worked as a producer for numerous other artists including: Camera Obscura, Ed Harcourt, Markus Krunegård, Terra, Eldkvarn, Avantgardet, Nicolai Dunger, Frida Hyvönen, Johnossi, [ingenting], Kajsa Grytt, The Concretes, Ishaaq Aarkistra to name but a few...

== Selection of recordings produced by Jari Haapalainen ==
- A Taste of Ra: Morning Of My Life
- Avantgardet: three albums
- Mattias Alkberg BD: Ditt Hjärta Är En Stjärna
- The Bear Quartet: 15 albums
- Camera Obscura: Let's Get Out of This Country, My Maudlin Career, Look to the East, Look to the West
- The Concretes: The Concretes, Hey Trouble
- Nicolai Dunger: seven albums
- Eldkvarn: five albums
- Anna Maria Espinosa: Glowing With You
- Kajsa Grytt: Brott & Straff - historier från ett kvinnofängelse, En kvinna under påverkan, Jag ler, jag dör
- Ed Harcourt: Strangers, The Beautiful Lie
- Heikki: Heikki, Heikki II
- Honey Is Cool: Bolero!, Early Morning Are You Working?, Baby Jane
- Frida Hyvönen: three albums
- [ingenting]: Tomhet, Idel Tomhet
- The (International) Noise Conspiracy: two albums
- Ishaaq Aarkistra: Arikomban Space
- Per "Texas" Johansson: Stråk På Himlen Och Stora Hus
- Johnossi: All They Ever Wanted
- Siri Karlsson - six albums
- Maida Vale: Madness Is Too Pure
- Markus Krunegård: Rastlöst Blod
- Laakso: four albums
- Lacrosse: Bandages For The Heart
- Eric Malmberg: Verklighet & Beat
- Moneybrother: four albums
- The Plan: Walk For Gold
- Sahara Hotnights: Sahara Hotnights
- Christopher Sander: Jorden Var Rund
- Stella Rocket: Stella Rocket
- Terra: Livslinjen
- The Tiny: Starring: Someone Like You
- True Moon-True Moon
- Rebecka Törnqvist: Scorpions
- Kristofer Åström & Hidden Truck - two albums
- Vega: two albums
- Vånna Inget: Ingen Botten

== As a musician ==
- 2016 - Fusion Machine - JH3-Jari Haapalainen Trio
- 2017 - Fusion Madness - JH3-Jari Haapalainen Trio
- 2017 - Fusion Nation - JH3-Jari Haapalainen Trio
- 2018 - Fusion Live! - JH3-Jari Haapalainen Trio
- 2020 - FUSION FOREVER - JH3-Jari Haapalainen Trio
