= You Can't Hurry Love (disambiguation) =

"You Can't Hurry Love" is a 1966 song by The Supremes, notably covered by Phil Collins.

You Can't Hurry Love may also refer to:

- "You Can't Hurry Love" (Concretes song), 2004
- You Can't Hurry Love (film), a 1988 comedy film featuring Bridget Fonda

== See also ==
- Can't Hurry Love
