= My Girls (Animal Collective song) =

Single by Animal Collective

from the album Merriweather Post Pavilion
- Released: March 23, 2009
- Recorded: February 2008
- Genre: Experimental pop
- Length: 5:40
- Label: Domino
- Songwriter: Animal Collective
- Producers: Ben H. Allen, Animal Collective

Animal Collective singles chronology
| "Fireworks" (2007) | "My Girls" (2009) | "Summertime Clothes" (2009) |

"My Girls" is a song by American band Animal Collective, released as the first single from their eighth studio album Merriweather Post Pavilion. It was released on March 23, 2009, by Domino Records as a promo CD only.

The song was released to massive critical acclaim, being named the number-one song of 2009 by Pitchfork. It was also named one of the best songs of all time in a 2014 NME list. In 2026, "My Girls" was certified Gold by the Recording Industry Association of America (RIAA), indicating an equivalent of 500,000 copies sold via a combination of sales and streaming. It was Animal Collective's first Gold release.

== Background ==
During the tours of 2007 and 2008, the song was known as "House".

Panda Bear explained to Clash that lyrically the song is about his "desire on a basic level to own my own place and kind of provide a safe house for my family and the people I care about."

The song resembles a seminal piece of early house music, "Your Love" (1984), by Frankie Knuckles and Jamie Principle.

The song's intro contains an audio sample from the Cassini-Huygens spacecraft, which explored Saturn's atmosphere and rings and gathered information about its moons; as part of its mission, the probe was destroyed in September 2017.

== Video ==
A promotional music video was created, showing the three members who worked on the album performing the song with samplers, synthesizers and percussion instruments. The video was animated by Jon Vermilyea, whose illustrations were used in the artwork for the band's live compilation Animal Crack Box. Only Avey Tare and Panda Bear's lips and Geologist's caving headlamp can be seen, with complete black bodies in colored scenarios, eventually becoming green and melting at the end of the video.

== Use in media ==
An edited version of the song was used in the BBC Panorama program The Secrets of Scientology.

An edited version of this song appears during Jake Johnson's part in Alien Workshop's skate film, Mindfield. The song can also be heard briefly during a party sequence in the 2012 film Project X. Beyoncé interpolated "My Girls" in her song "6 Inch" from her sixth studio album Lemonade (2016).

== Accolades ==
- "My Girls" was named the #1 Song of 2009 by Pitchfork.
- In 2009, Pitchfork listed the song at #9 of their Top 500 Tracks of the 2000s.
- NME named "My Girls" the 5th best song of 2009.
- Slant Magazine named "My Girls" the best song of 2009.
- The Village Voice named "My Girls" the third best-song of 2009 on their annual Pazz & Jop critics' poll.
- In October 2011, NME placed it at number 91 on its list "150 Best Tracks of the Past 15 Years".
- In 2014, NME named "My Girls" the 248th best song of all time.

== Cover versions ==
- 2009 – Taken by Trees, East of Eden (as "My Boys")
- 2011 – The Becca Stevens Band, Weightless
- 2013 – Tears for Fears
- 2014 – Tall Tall Trees, The Seasonal

== Certifications ==
| Region | Certification | Certified units/sales |
|---|---|---|
| United States (RIAA) | Gold | 500,000^{‡} |
^{‡} Sales+streaming figures based on certification alone.
