= On the Radio (The Concretes song) =

Single by The Concretes

from the album In Colour
- Released: 12 June 2006
- Recorded: 2005
- Genre: Indie pop
- Length: 3:15 (edit) 3:23 (album version)
- Label: Licking Fingers, EMI
- Songwriter(s): Maria Eriksson, Martin Hansson, Ulrik Karlsson, Lisa Milberg, Per Nyström, Ludvig Rylander, Daniel Värjö, Victoria Lena Bergsman
- Producer(s): The Concretes

The Concretes singles chronology
"Chosen One" (2006)	"On the Radio" (2006)	"Kids" (2007)

"On the Radio" is a song by Swedish band The Concretes from their second album In Colour. It was released as the second single from that album in the United Kingdom on 12 June 2006.

== Track listings ==
- 7" white vinyl single LFS7021
1. "On the Radio" (edit) - 3:15
2. "First Time" - 2:10
- 7" yellow vinyl single LFS7X021
1. "Off the Radio" ("On the Radio" edit)
2. "End of Mandolins" - 3:50
- CD single LFS021
1. "On the Radio" (edit) - 3:15
2. "First Time" - 2:10
3. "End of Mandolins" - 3:50
4. "On the Radio" (video)

== Charts ==
Year	Chart	Position
2006	UK Singles Chart	85
