= Lady December =

Single by the Concretes
- Released: 2004
- Genre: Indie pop
- Label: Licking Fingers
- Songwriters: Victoria Bergsman, John Berthling, Martin Bo Erik Erikson, Ulrik Karlsson, Martin Hansson, Ulrik Johannes Janusson, Lisa Milberg, Per Nyström, Ludvig Rylander, Daniel Värjö

The Concretes singles chronology
"Chico" (2004)	"Lady December" (2004)	"Chosen One" (2006)

"Lady December" is a 2004 single by the Concretes.

== Track listing ==
- Digipack LFS016
1. "Lady December"
2. "The Warrior"
3. "Seems Fine Shuffle"

== Charts ==
Year	Chart	Position
2004	Sverigetopplistan	36
