= All They Ever Wanted =

Studio album by Johnossi
- Released: 27 March 2008
- Recorded: 2008
- Genre: Rock
- Length: 37:00
- Label: Universal UK

Johnossi chronology
Johnossi (2006)	All They Ever Wanted (2008)	Mavericks (2010)

Singles from All They Ever Wanted
- 1. "Party With My Pain" Released: 13 February 2008; 2. "18 Karat Gold" Released: 11 June 2008; 3. "Bobby" Released: 20 October 2008

Professional ratings
Review scores
Source	Rating
Allmusic	3/5 stars

All They Ever Wanted is the second album released by the Swedish rock group Johnossi. It includes the singles "Party With My Pain", "18 Karat Gold" and "Bobby".

== Track listing ==
All tracks composed by John Engelbert.

1. "18 Karat Gold" - 4:42
2. "Party with My Pain" - 3:37
3. "Send More Money" - 3:06
4. "Train Song" - 3:09
5. "In the Mystery Time of Cold and Rain" - 3:22
6. "Zeppelin" - 4:00
7. "Bobby" - 4:09
8. "All They Ever Wanted" - 2:31
9. "Up in the Air" - 3:20
10. "Lie Lie Die" - 5:04
11. "Break Into School (Late At Night)" - 4:02 (iTunes bonus track)

== Personnel ==
- Oskar "Ossi" Bonde – percussion, drums, group member
- John Engelbert – guitar, vocals, group member
- Jari Haapalainen – producer
- Henrik Jonsson – mastering
- Markus Krunegård – backing vocals
- Mathias Olden – mixing
