= You Better Run (disambiguation) =

"You Better Run" is a 1966 song by The Young Rascals, covered in 1980 by Pat Benatar.

You Better Run may also refer to:

- Boyoubetterunow, a 2000 compilation album by The Concretes
- "Run Run Run", a 1967 song by The Velvet Underground whose chorus includes the line 'You better run run run'
- "You Better Run", a gospel song otherwise known as "I'm Gonna Run to the City of Refuge", recorded by among others Blind Willie Johnson
- "You Better Run", a song on the 1992 album All Night Long by Junior Kimbrough
- "You Better Run", a song on the 1992 album March ör Die by Motörhead
- You Better Run: The Essential Junior Kimbrough, a 2002 compilation album by Junior Kimbrough
