= Let's Get Out of This Country =

Studio album by Camera Obscura
- Released: 6 June 2006
- Genres: Indie pop; twee pop; baroque pop
- Length: 39:09
- Labels: Elefant, Merge
- Producer: Jari Haapalainen

Camera Obscura chronology
Underachievers Please Try Harder (2003)	Let's Get Out of This Country (2006)	My Maudlin Career (2009)

Singles from Let's Get Out of This Country
- 1. "Lloyd, I'm Ready to Be Heartbroken" Released: May 2006; 2. "Let's Get Out of This Country" Released: 2006; 3. "If Looks Could Kill" Released: January 2007; 4. "Tears for Affairs" Released: 2007

Let's Get Out of This Country is the third studio record by the Scottish indie pop band Camera Obscura, released by Elefant Records on 6 June 2006. It was recorded in Sweden with the producer Jari Haapalainen, and arranged by Björn Yttling of Peter Bjorn and John.

The album addresses themes of heartbreak, escapism and boredom. It received positive reviews from music critics, who noted that the band had distinguished themselves from Belle and Sebastian. Let's Get Out of This Country yielded four singles.

== Background and composition ==
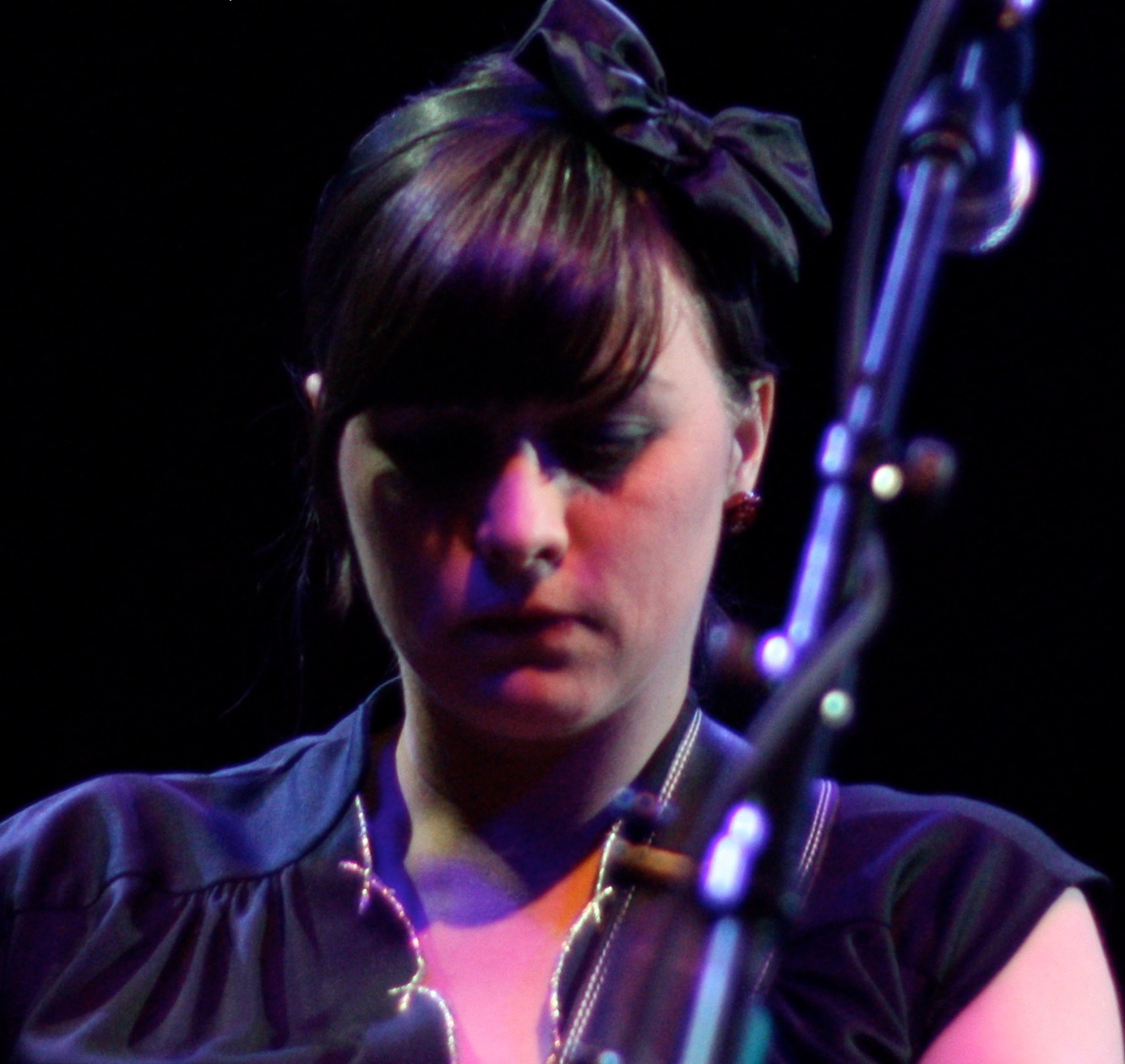
The album was composed by Tracyanne Campbell.

Following the 2003 release of Underachievers Please Try Harder, vocalist John Henderson left Camera Obscura in 2004. The band did not want to self-produce another record, and Stephen McRobbie of The Pastels recommended Jari Haapalainen, guitarist for The Bear Quartet. The band practiced for several weeks before travelling to work with Haapalainen for two weeks in Stockholm. Accustomed to recording over the course of multiple sessions, the band decided to take a more disciplined approach. They recorded 15 songs and selected 10 for the album, all of which were written by Tracyanne Campbell. Because of the short time in which the album was recorded, the final tracks closely resemble the original live recordings.

Let's Get Out of This Country marked a transition for the band from acoustic sounds to more upbeat rock. The music was influenced by the Motown Sound, Lee Hazlewood's collaborations with Nancy Sinatra and David Lynch's soundtracks. Haapalainen helped the band to modernize their sound and avoid the pastiche present in some of their earlier efforts.

Campbell, who was dealing with a breakup and the death of her grandmother, wrote many of the songs to be about heartbreak and lovelessness. The lyrics also deal with escapism and feelings of loneliness. Campbell named the American country singers Patsy Cline and Tammy Wynette as influences. The album's title was chosen to reflect what she recalled as "being quite bored with myself and everything in my life, wanting to do something new and give myself a bit of a shake."

== Reception and release ==
Professional ratings
Aggregate scores
Source	Rating
Metacritic	77/100
Review scores
Source	Rating
AllMusic	5/5 stars
The A.V. Club	B+
DIY	8/10
The Guardian	3/5 stars
Mojo	4/5 stars
NME	6/10
Pitchfork	7.8/10
Slant Magazine	4.5/5 stars
Spin	3/5 stars
Uncut	4/5 stars

Let's Get Out of This Country received positive reviews from music critics. Indie music magazine Under the Radar called it "a gorgeous pop album, to say the least." Spin wrote that the band "prove that there's such a thing as brawny twee…[The album] is indie pop but that's baroque but not self-indulgent." The Guardian described Campbell's vocals as "gorgeously mellifluous one" but added that "sweetness gets monotonous, and the album could do with more jolts of bitter energy". PopMatters said that the band had become "comfortable with its craft" and that its stronger songwriting was reflected in the album's "leisurely melodic lines".

Camera Obscura had previously been compared to Belle and Sebastian, another Glaswegian band, because of similarities in the bands' style of "melancholy, grandiose retro-styled" indie pop, and reviewers noted a new contrast between the two acts. Slant Magazine said that the album found "Camera Obscura stepping out from the considerable shadow cast by Stuart Murdoch and pals, brimming with a newfound confidence and a bolder, more ambitious sonic palette". Uncut wrote that while Belle and Sebastian were "seemingly lost to soft-pop pastichery, [Camera Obscura] have come out of their shadow and flourished." Pitchfork commented that the band had not changed significantly but that they "no longer recall Belle and Sebastian; they only sound like themselves." The NME wrote, "Now that Belle and Sebastian have left their whimsical ways behind, it's up to their fellow Glaswegians Camera Obscura to take up the cause of indie-popsters everywhere, and it's something they appear to be bang up for." AllMusic summarized Let's Get Out of This Country as "enchanting" and continued that "stepping fully out of the shadow of their onetime patrons Belle and Sebastian, the group has composed and performed an album that…ranks with the best indie pop albums ever".

Pitchfork placed the album at 45 on its year-end list and at number 179 on their list of top 200 albums of the 2000s. PopMatters listed the album 60th on its list of the year's best albums, and it named Let's Get Out of This Country the second best indie pop album of the year. Stylus Magazine ranked the album 22 on its year-end list. In a retrospective of Merge Records, Paste named Let's Get Out of This Country the label's best 2006 release. Under the Radar ranked the album fourth in its list of the Best Albums of the Decade (2000–2009). Fact magazine listed the album at 93 on its 2000s list.

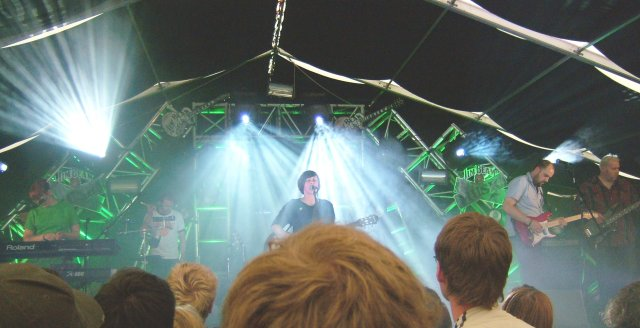
Camera Obscura performing at the Summer Sundae festival in August 2006.

Spanish independent label Elefant Records released the album worldwide, except for North America where it was licensed to Merge Records. Following the album's June release, Camera Obscura promoted it with a North American tour in July, followed by a series of performances at European festivals in August and September. Let's Get Out of This Country went on to sell 17,100 copies in the United Kingdom and 58,000 copies in North America.

== Singles ==
"Lloyd, I'm Ready to Be Heartbroken" (2006)
The album's lead single, which combines Campbell's deadpan vocals with a melodic string arrangement.

"Lloyd, I'm Ready to be Heartbroken" was released as the album's lead single in May 2006, with B-side "Roman Holiday". The song was written as a response to Lloyd Cole and the Commotions' 1984 song "Are You Ready to be Heartbroken?". Campbell had been listening to Rattlesnakes and wanted to respond out of "pure and utter love for the song." "Lloyd, I'm Ready to be Heartbroken" includes a string arrangement and organ interlude. It placed 38 on the 2006 Pazz & Jop list. The song was ranked 118 on Pitchfork's list of the best songs of the decade, and Mojo put it at 46 on its list of the best UK indie records.

The music video for "Lloyd, I'm Ready to Be Heartbroken" depicts a couple dancing through Tokyo, a department store, and "Lloyd"-brand boxes in the style of Andy Warhol's Brillo Boxes. Campbell did not want to dance in the video, so it includes cuts of her standing still with a sullen expression. An alternative video was directed by Victoria Bergsman, singer for The Concretes, and includes artwork by Frànçois & the Atlas Mountains's frontman François Marry. The song was played over the opening credits of the films P.S. I Love You and Over Her Dead Body.

"Let's Get Out of This Country" became the album's second single. The song discusses boredom and wanting to change one's life. The single includes a gloomy cover of Sheena Easton's 1980 single "Modern Girl" as its B-side.

The band released a single for "If Looks Could Kill" in January 2007. It had three new songs, including a cover of The Paris Sisters' 1961 single "I Love How You Love Me". "If Looks Could Kill" uses hard-hitting percussion and guitar similar to The Velvet Underground. The song was used on American TV program Grey's Anatomy.

"Tears for Affairs" became the album's fourth and final single. The song features Campbell singing softly over a bossa nova sound.

== Track listing ==
All tracks are written by Tracyanne Campbell

No.	Title	Length
1.	"Lloyd, I'm Ready to Be Heartbroken"	3:49
2.	"Tears for Affairs"	4:04
3.	"Come Back Margaret"	3:47
4.	"Dory Previn"	4:16
5.	"The False Contender"	3:38
6.	"Let's Get Out of This Country"	3:21
7.	"Country Mile"	3:59
8.	"If Looks Could Kill"	3:29
9.	"I Need All the Friends I Can Get"	3:18
10.	"Razzle Dazzle Rose"	5:28
