= Saltsjöbaden =

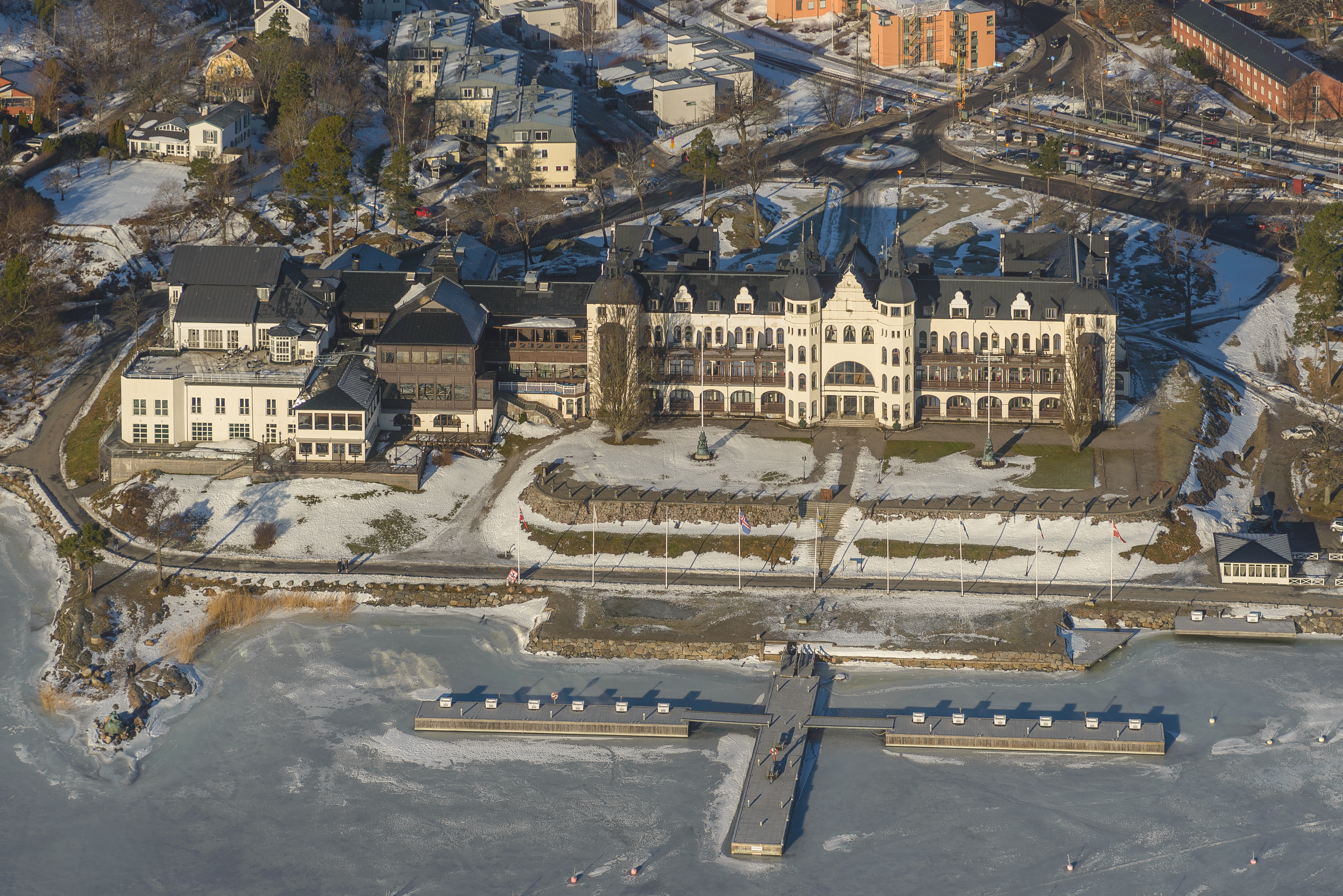
- Aerial winter view of Grand Hotel Saltsjöbaden

- Location within Stockholm Location within Sweden Location within European Union
- Coordinates: 59°17′10″N 18°17′14″E
- Country: Sweden
- Province: Södermanland
- County: Stockholm County
- Municipality: Nacka Municipality

Area
  - Total: 5.42 km^{2} (2.09 sq mi)

Population (31 December 2020)
  - Total: 9,467
  - Density: 1,750/km^{2} (4,520/sq mi)
- Time zone: UTC+1 (CET)
  - Summer (DST): UTC+2 (CEST)

Saltsjöbaden is a locality in Nacka Municipality, Stockholm County, Sweden with 9,491 inhabitants in 2010. It is on the Baltic Sea coast, deep in the Stockholm Archipelago.

== History ==
Saltsjöbaden (lit. 'the Salt Sea baths') was developed as a resort by Knut Agathon Wallenberg, a member of the wealthy and influential Wallenberg family, from farmland which he bought in 1891 through a newly created railway company.

Saltsjöbaden was an independent municipality from 1909 to 1970. In 1971 it was reintegrated into Nacka Municipality.

The local railway (Saltsjöbanan), built by Wallenberg and completed in 1893, connects Saltsjöbaden with Stockholm, with its terminus at Slussen. The railway was taken over by Storstockholms Lokaltrafik in the late 1960s and integrated in the Stockholm public transport system.

Two luxurious hotels (1893) and a sanatorium were built, designed by architect Erik Josephson. The parish church, Uppenbarelsekyrkan (the "Church of the Epiphany"), was built in 1910–13 and designed by Ferdinand Boberg with decoration by Olle Hjortzberg and Carl Milles, among others. The remainder of the land bought by the railway company was subdivided into plots; with the railway facilitating communications with the city, Saltsjöbaden soon became a popular suburb for the upper and upper-middle classes who purchased plots and developed them with spacious private houses.

The Stockholm Observatory was located in Saltsjöbaden (see Saltsjöbaden Observatory) from 1931 to 2001. It has a 40 inch (102 cm) Grubb reflector and a double refractor telescope. The asteroid 36614 Saltis, discovered there in 2000, was named after a common nickname of the place. The hilltop premises are now a school.

The larger of the two hotels, Grand Hotel Saltsjöbaden, was the location of the negotiations between the Swedish Employers Association (now the Confederation of Swedish Enterprise) and the Swedish Trade Union Confederation, which led to the Saltsjöbaden Agreement on 20 December 1938. The agreement materialized into the social democratic class compromise, or form of industrial relations in Sweden, the so-called "Saltsjöbaden spirit", marked by willingness to co-operate and a cross-class, collective sense of responsibility for developments in the national labour market and in the Swedish economy generally.

In the world of chess, Saltsjöbaden is famous for the 1948 Interzonal tournament won by David Bronstein of the USSR, and the 1952 Interzonal won by Alexander Kotov, also of the USSR.

Grand Hotel Saltsjöbaden hosted the annual meeting of the Bilderberg Group in 1962, 1973 and 1984.

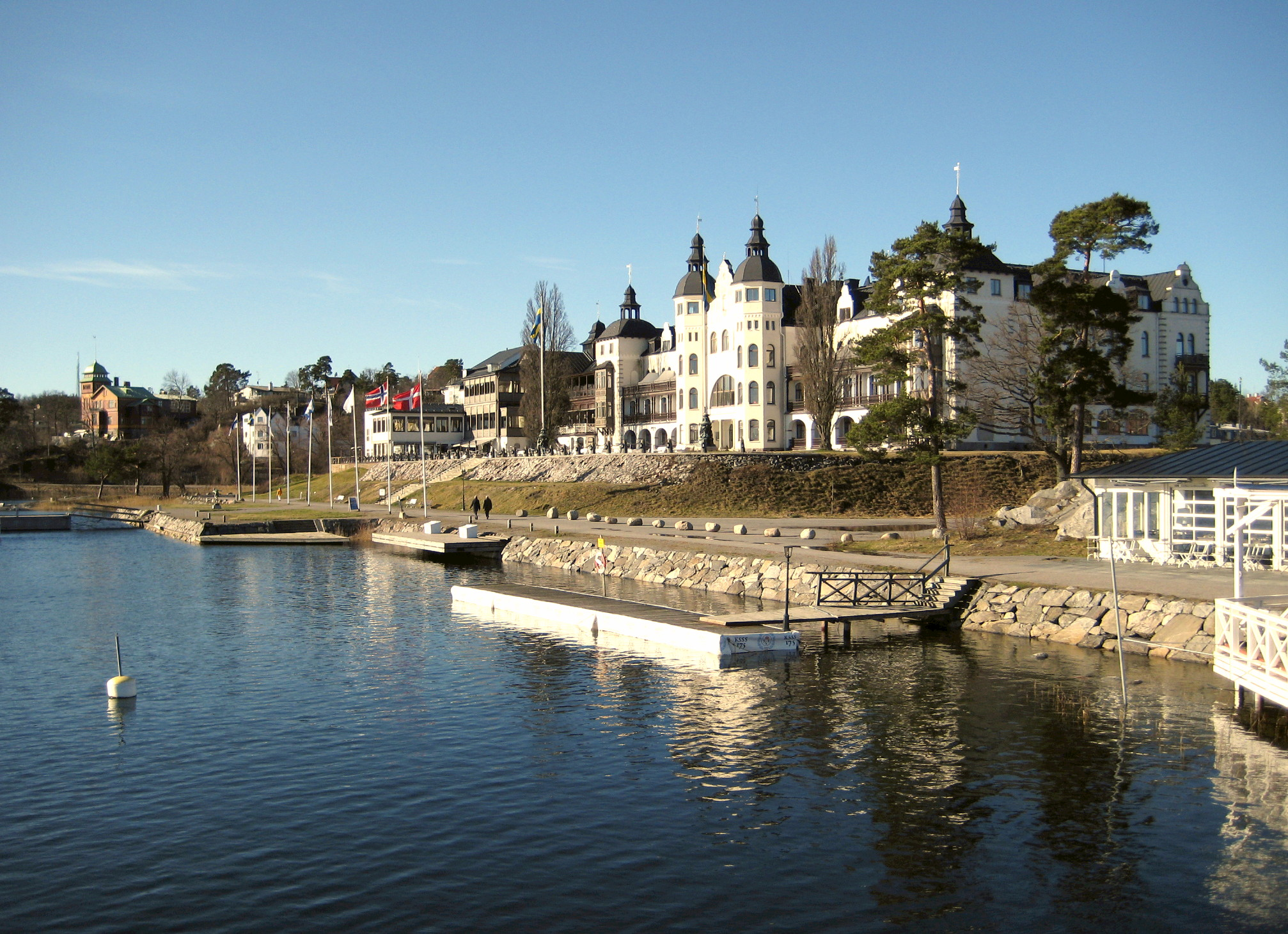
Grand Hotel Saltsjöbaden

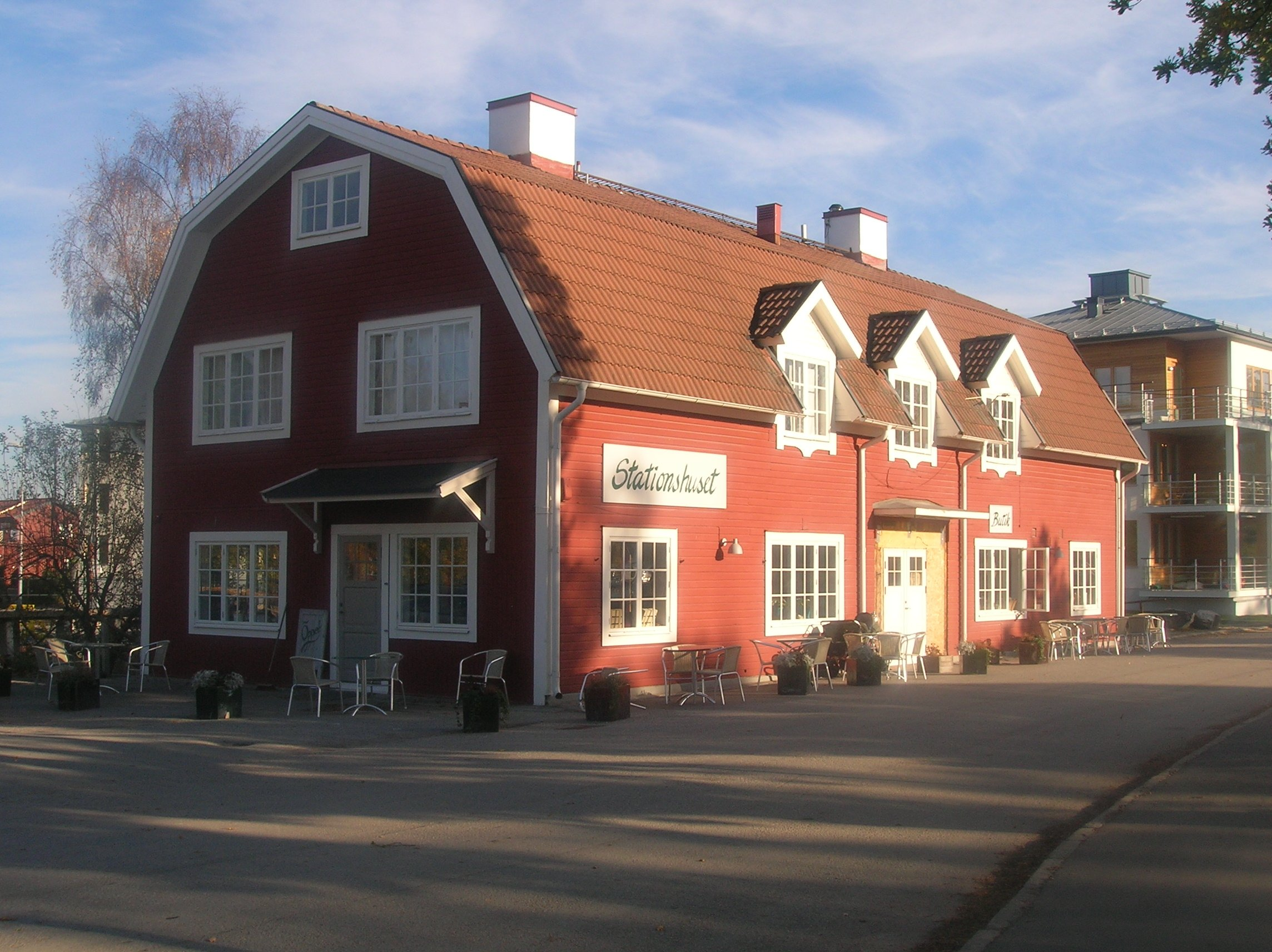
The station house at Saltsjöbaden

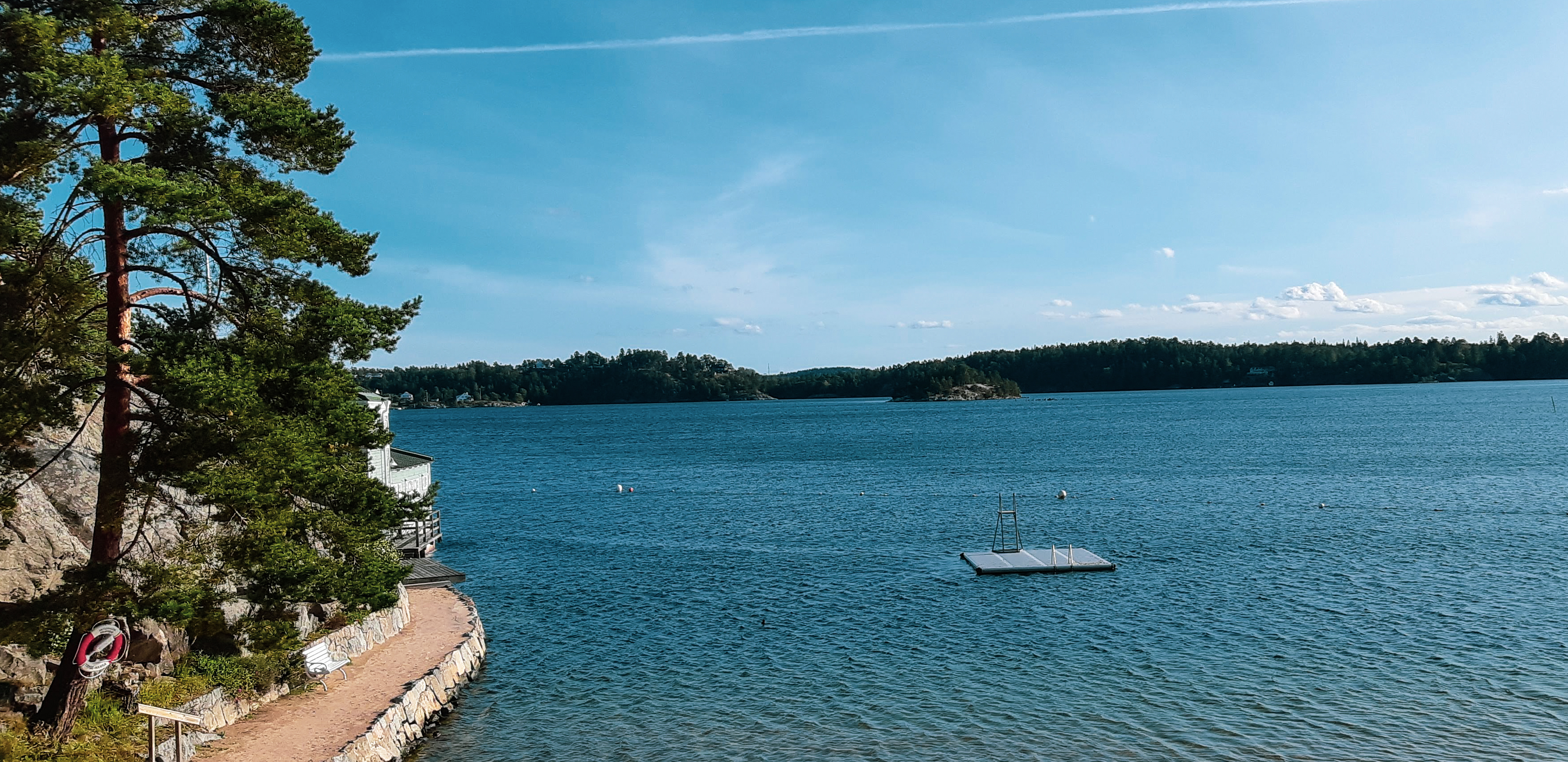
The view from the beach at Saltsjöbaden

== Notable residents ==
- Inger Brattström, author of many books for children, lived in Saltsjöbaden and died there in 2018, 97 years old.
- John Engelbert, member of the rock duo Johnossi was born and grew up in Saltsjöbaden.
- Alice Habsburg, aristocrat and Polish resistance figure, died in Saltsjöbaden in 1985.
- Kang Youwei, the reformer of Great Qing Imperial, visited Sweden after the failure of the Hundred Days' Reform. He bought an islet off Saltsjöbaden in 1904 and stayed there until he left Sweden in 1907. The islet is sometimes referred to in Chinese as Kang Youwei Island.
- Fredrik Kessiakoff, twice Swedish Olympian
- Sture Stork, sailor
- Ivar Wickman, physician who discovered the epidemic and contagious character of poliomyelitis in 1907

Companies:

- Geodesign Barriers, manufacturer of temporary flood defense systems.

== See also ==
- 2013 Saltsjöbanan train crash
