= Underachievers Please Try Harder =

Studio album by Camera Obscura
- Released: August 31, 2003
- Genre: Indie pop
- Length: 43:37
- Label: Merge
- Producer: Geoff Alan, Camera Obscura

Camera Obscura chronology
Biggest Bluest Hi Fi (2001)	Underachievers Please Try Harder (2003)	Let's Get Out of This Country (2006)

Underachievers Please Try Harder is the second LP from the indie band Camera Obscura, released in 2003. The album was released in Australia by Popfrenzy.

== Reception ==
Professional ratings
Aggregate scores
Source	Rating
Metacritic	74/100
Review scores
Source	Rating
AllMusic	4.5/5 stars
Christgau's Consumer Guide	(3-star Honorable Mention)
The List	3/5 marks
Pitchfork	8.0/10
Rolling Stone	3/5 stars
Spin	A
Uncut	4/5 stars

Writing for AllMusic, critic Tim Sendra praised the album, again comparing the group to Belle and Sebastian and writing that "the band manages the rare feat of sounding full and rich without jamming every possible frequency with sound. It also throws in loads of imaginative little hooks that keep things lively". Scott Plagenhoef of Pitchfork wrote "Their honest, wide, and adult approach to heartbreak, romantic liaisons, and escapism is extended to the subtle range of influence — most of which is shown off on the tracks sung by John Henderson".

== Track listing ==
All tracks are written by Tracyanne Campbell.

No.	Title	Length
1.	"Suspended from Class"	3:45
2.	"Keep It Clean"	3:13
3.	"A Sisters Social Agony"	3:58
4.	"Teenager"	3:39
5.	"Before You Cry"	2:58
6.	"Your Picture"	3:08
7.	"Number One Son"	4:06
8.	"Let Me Go Home"	3:34
9.	"Books Written for Girls"	5:12
10.	"Knee Deep at the NPL"	5:09
11.	"Lunar Sea"	4:55
Total length:		43:37

=== US edition bonus tracks ===
12. "I Don't Want to See You"
13. "Footloose and Fancy Free"

=== Australian edition bonus tracks ===
12. "San Francisco Song"
13. "Amigo Mio"

=== Japanese edition bonus tracks ===
12. "I Don't Want to See You"
13. "Footloose and Fancy Free"
14. "SF Song"
15. "Amigo Mio"

== Personnel ==
- Tracyanne Campbell – vocals, guitar
- Carey Lander – organ, piano, vocals
- Kenny McKeeve – vocals, guitar, harmonica, mandolin
- John Henderson – vocals, percussion
- Gavin Dunbar – bass
- Lee Thomson – drums
- Nigel Baillie – trumpet
- Geoff Allan – percussion, Stylophone

Production notes:

- Camera Obscura – producer
- Geoff Allan – producer, engineer
- Frank Arkwright – mastering
- Stuart Murdoch – photography
