= Seems Fine =

Single by The Concretes

from the album The Concretes
- Released: September 20, 2004
- Genre: Indie pop
- Label: Licking Fingers
- Songwriters: Maria Eriksson, Martin Hansson, Ulrik Karlsson, Lisa Milberg, Per Nyström, Ludvig Rylander, Daniel Värjö, Victoria Lena Bergsman,

The Concretes singles chronology
"Say Something New" (2004)	"Seems Fine" (2004)	"Chico" (2004)

"Seems Fine" is a 2004 single by Swedish indie pop band The Concretes.

== Track listing ==
1. "Seems Fine"
2. "Just Locals"
3. "Chico" (Avalanches' Wernham Hogg Remix)
4. "Seems Fine" (Video)

== Release history ==
- Promo CD, LFSDJ011 ("Seems Fine" and "Just Locals" only)
- CD-single, LFS013
- CD-single, LFSX013 ("Seems Fine" and "Just Locals" only)
- 7" vinyl, LF7013 ("Seems Fine" and "Just Locals" only)

== Charts ==
Year	Chart	Position
2004	UK Singles Chart	52
