= The Concretes (album) =

Studio album by The Concretes
- Released: 2 May 2003
- Genre: Indie pop
- Length: 42:37
- Label: Licking Fingers
- Producer: Jari Haapalainen

The Concretes chronology
Nationalgeographic (2001)	The Concretes (2003)	Layourbattleaxedown (2005)

Alternative covers
- Original Scandinavian release

Professional ratings
Aggregate scores
Source	Rating
Metacritic	75/100
Review scores
Source	Rating
AllMusic	4/5 stars
Alternative Press	5/5
Entertainment Weekly	B+
The Guardian	3/5 stars
NME	9/10
Pitchfork	8.1/10
Rolling Stone	3/5 stars
Uncut	4/5 stars

The Concretes is the debut studio album by Swedish indie pop band The Concretes. It was first released in Sweden on 2 May 2003 by Licking Fingers, and was released internationally in 2004.

== Track listing ==
All lyrics are written by Victoria Bergsman; all music is composed by The Concretes.

No.	Title	Length
1.	"Say Something New"	3:48
2.	"You Can't Hurry Love"	2:02
3.	"Chico"	5:07
4.	"New Friend"	4:11
5.	"Diana Ross"	3:42
6.	"Warm Night"	3:37
7.	"Foreign Country"	1:45
8.	"Seems Fine"	2:12
9.	"Lovin Kind"	5:35
10.	"Lonely As Can Be"	3:32
11.	"This One's for You"	7:06

== Personnel ==
The Concretes

- Victoria Bergsman
- Maria Eriksson
- Martin Hansson
- Ulrik Karlsson
- Lisa Milsberg
- Per Nyström
- Ludvig Rylander
- Daniel Värjö

Additional personnel

- Erik Bünger – backing vocals
- Nicolai Dunger – backing vocals
- Jari Haapalainen – percussion, mandolin
- Tomas Hallonsten – piano
- Malte Homberg – backing vocals
- Christian Hörgren – cello and string arrangements
- Irene Kastner – harp
- Peter Nyhlin – backing vocals
- Anne Pajunen – viola
- Thomas Ringquist – viola
- Anna Rodell – violin
- Jonna Sandell – violin

== Charts ==
Chart (2004)	Peak position
UK Albums (Official Charts)	89

== Release history ==
Region	Date	Label	Catalog no.
Sweden	2 May 2003	Licking Fingers	LFCD012 (CD); LFLP012 (LP)
United Kingdom	21 June 2004	Licking Fingers	LFCD012 (CD); LFLP012 (LP)
United States	29 June 2004	Astralwerks	ASW 71126
France	4 October 2004	Licking Fingers	LFCD012 (CD); LFLP012 (LP)
Japan	16 February 2005	Toshiba-EMI	TOCP 66362
