= Danny Coughlan =

English singer and guitarist (1970–2026)

Danny Coughlan (11 March 1970 – 26 January 2026) was an English singer and guitarist from London, later based in Bristol.

He performed under the name "Crybaby". In an article in Vice magazine, Tom Watson, then deputy leader of the Labour Party, has described him as a "master songwriter".

His debut Crybaby album, Crybaby, was released by Helium Records on 9 April 2012. It was produced by Chris Hughes. The track "When the Lights Go Out" was on the soundtrack Colossal which was released in 2017.

A collaborative project between singer-songwriter Tracyanne Campbell (Camera Obscura) and Danny was released by Merge Records in May 2018 with the title Tracyanne & Danny. The album was co-produced by Edwyn Collins along with engineer and multi-instrumentalist Sean Read (Dexys Midnight Runners).

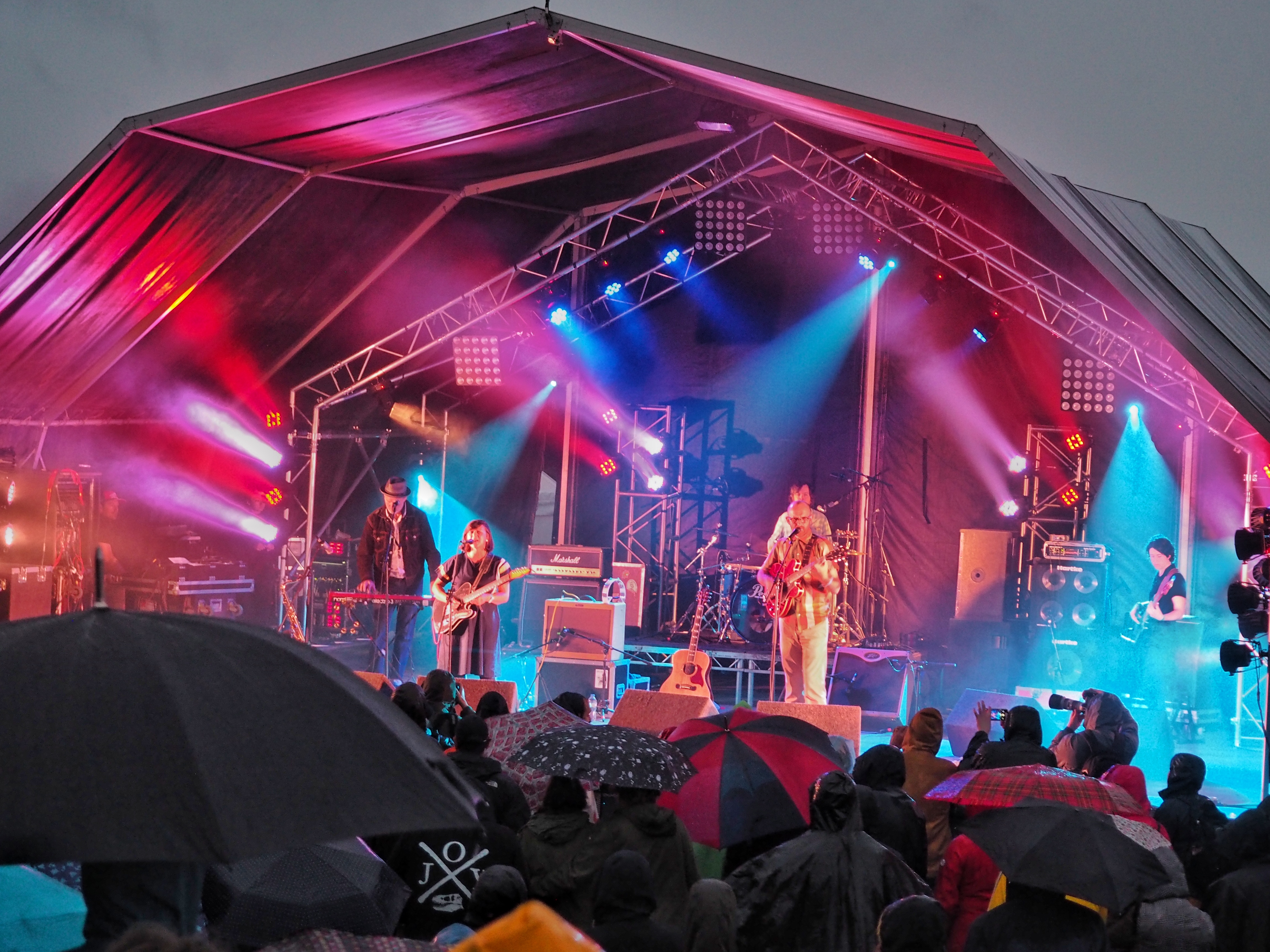
Tracyanne & Danny

Coughlan died on 26 January 2026.
