= Johnossi (album) =

Studio album by Johnossi
- Released: 2006
- Genre: Rock
- Label: Rekord Musik

Johnossi chronology
Johnossi (2006)	All They Ever Wanted (2008)

Johnossi is the debut album by Swedish rock duo Johnossi, released on September 25, 2006.

== Track listing ==
1. "The Show Tonight" 3:50
2. "Execution Song" 2:14
3. "Glory Days to Come" 2:54
4. "There's a Lot of Things to Do Before You Die" 2:38
5. "Man Must Dance" 2:34
6. "Family Values" 3:30
7. "Press Hold" 4:34
8. "Rescue Team" 2:58
9. "From Peoples Heart" 2:58
10. "Santa Monica Bay" 2:35
11. "The Lottery" 4:00
12. "Summerbreeze" 2:52
