= Say Something New =

Single by The Concretes

from the album The Concretes
- Released: April 12, 2004
- Genre: Indie pop
- Label: Licking Fingers
- Songwriters: Maria Eriksson, Martin Hansson, Ulrik Karlsson, Lisa Milberg, Per Nyström, Ludvig Rylander, Daniel Värjö, Victoria Lena Bergsman,

The Concretes singles chronology
"Warm Night" (2003)	"Say Something New" (2004)	"Seems Fine" (2004)

"Say Something New" is a 2004 single by The Concretes. It was used in a number of advertisements for target introducing the band to many.

== Track listing ==
1. "Say Something New"
2. "Forces"
3. "Sugar"
4. "Miss You"

== Release history ==
- CD-single LFCD009, Scandinavian release
- CD-promo LFCDDJ010, UK promo
- CD-single LFCD010, UK release
- 12" vinyl, LFE010, UK release

== Charts ==
Year	Chart	Position
2004	UK Indie Chart	46
