= East of Eden (album) =

Studio album by Taken by Trees
- Released: 7 September 2009
- Genre: Indie pop; world
- Length: 32:33
- Label: Rough Trade
- Producer: Victoria Bergsman; Dan Lissvik

Taken by Trees chronology
Open Field (2007)	East of Eden (2009)	Other Worlds (2012)

Singles from East of Eden
- 1. "Anna" Released: 14 December 2009

Professional ratings
Aggregate scores
Source	Rating
AnyDecentMusic?	7.7/10
Metacritic	82/100
Review scores
Source	Rating
AllMusic	4/5 stars
The Boston Phoenix	4/4 stars
Clash	7/10
Drowned in Sound	8/10
The Irish Times	4/5 stars
The Observer	4/5 stars
Pitchfork	8.1/10
Q	4/5 stars
Spin	7/10
Uncut	4/5 stars

East of Eden is the second studio album by Taken by Trees, the solo project of Swedish musician Victoria Bergsman. The album was released on 7 September 2009 by Rough Trade Records. Bergsman travelled to Pakistan to record the album, and several of the album's songs incorporate influences from Pakistani music.

The song "My Boys" is a cover of the Animal Collective song "My Girls" with some minor lyric changes. The song "Anna" also features Animal Collective member Noah "Panda Bear" Lennox on backing vocals. The song "To Lose Someone" features the voice of local Sufi musician Sain Muhammad Ali.

== Track listing ==
All tracks are written by Victoria Bergsman, except where noted.

No.	Title	Writer(s)	Length
1.	"To Lose Someone"	Bergsman; Andreas Söderström	4:46
2.	"Anna"		4:25
3.	"Watch the Waves"		4:24
4.	"Greyest Love of All"		3:41
5.	"Tidens Gång"		1:45
6.	"Wapas Karna"	Traditional	2:36
7.	"My Boys"	Noah Lennox; David Portner; Brian Weitz	3:11
8.	"Day by Day"	Bergsman; Söderström	3:25
9.	"Bekännelse"	Bergsman; Söderström; Hermann Hesse	4:20
Total length:			32:33

== Charts ==
Chart (2009)	Peak position
Swedish Albums (Sverigetopplistan)	43
