= Hey Trouble =

Studio album by The Concretes
- Released: 4 April 2007
- Genre: Indie pop
- Length: 40:49
- Label: Licking Fingers
- Producer: Jari Haapalainen

The Concretes chronology
In Colour (2006)	Hey Trouble (2007)

Professional ratings
Review scores
Source	Rating
Pitchfork Media	5.5/10 stars

Hey Trouble is the third studio album by The Concretes, and their first after the departure of lead vocalist Victoria Bergsman. It was preceded by the release of the single "Kids" on 14 March 2007.

== Track listing ==
1. "Hey Trouble" – 1:27
2. "A Whale's Heart" – 3:57
3. "Kids" – 3:45
4. "Firewatch" – 3:45
5. "Didion" – 4:50
6. "Oh Boy" – 2:44
7. "Keep Yours" – 2:35
8. "If We're Lucky We Don't Get There on Time" – 3:18
9. "Souvenirs" – 3:24
10. "Are You Prepared" – 3:06
11. "Oh No" – 3:52
12. "Simple Song" – 4:06

== Personnel ==
- Maria Eriksson
- Martin Hansson
- Ulrik Janusson
- Lisa Milberg
- Per Nystrom
- Ludvig Rylander
- Daniel Varjo
- Music by The Concretes; Lyrics by Lisa Milberg

== Charts ==
Chart performance for Hey Trouble
Chart (2007)	Peak position
Swedish Albums (Sverigetopplistan)	26
