= Desire Lines =

Studio album by Camera Obscura
- Released: 3 June 2013
- Genre: Indie pop
- Length: 46:42
- Label: 4AD
- Producer: Tucker Martine

Camera Obscura chronology
My Maudlin Career (2009)	Desire Lines (2013)	Look to the East, Look to the West (2024)

Singles from Desire Lines
- 1. "Do It Again" Released: May 2013; 2. "Break It to You Gently / Do It Again" Released: 8 October 2013; 3. "Troublemaker" Released: October 2013

Desire Lines is the fifth album released by Scottish indie pop band Camera Obscura. The album was released on 3 June 2013 on the 4AD record label. It was recorded in Portland, Oregon with producer Tucker Martine, and features guest vocals from Neko Case and My Morning Jacket's Jim James. It is the last album recorded with keyboardist Carey Lander, who was diagnosed with osteosarcoma during the early stages of the album's creation in 2011. Though lead singer Tracyanne Campbell found it difficult to write songs during Lander's illness, the latter insisted that the album be finished. After completing the album and touring with the band in support of it, Lander died on 11 October 2015.

== Music and lyrics ==
In terms of musicality, Allmusic's Fred Thomas told that the release is "another installment of brilliant pop". At American Songwriter, Hal Horowitz touched on how "these songs soar, glide and seem effortless in their innocent simplicity." Consequence of Sound's Bryant Kitching felt that "they’ve honed their brutally honest and quirky take on heartbreak into something they can now wield with delightful precision." Andy Gill of The Independent alluded to how "songwriter Tracyanne Campbell couches harsh, sometimes brutal sentiments in soothing musical surroundings." At The Skinny, Chris Buckle highlighted that the release "conveys a warm familiarity" that will be repaid with "many revisits" to listen to the album. Kevin Liedel of Slant Magazine evoked that "Desire Lines sees Camera Obscura straining harder for complexity; they maintain their famous sweetness while dialing back on some of the stronger melodies", but this leads to "their most balanced and monotonous effort to date, with such little distinction between its dozen sleep tracks that it makes ideal background music", which he called "sugary but tasteless syrup." Drowned in Sound's Jon Clark felt the album was consistent, which he told that "Desire Lines bears witness to a band that sound at ease with themselves", and this was accomplished in "layered with interest, the instruments subtly interweaving with one another to create music that is somehow both complex and simplistic." In addition, Clark called this "polished, luxurious pop", which contains "Campbell’s excellent vocal, [and this] makes for a consistently concise, effective and moving record." At Paste, Evan Rytlewski noted that "the result is the purest late-night album that Camera Obscura has recorded yet". This Is Fake DIY's Gareth Ware found this to be "literate, swooning pop music in the shape of new long-player 'Desire Lines'." At The A.V. Club, Annie Zaleski noted that the album "unlike previous Camera Obscura efforts, its songs aren’t as immediate or arresting" because it "has a few sleepy spots" that "causes it to drag on occasion."

In the realm of lyrics, Thomas said it has the "now trademark mixture of heartbreaking and sharply astute lyrical turns guiding the songs through either romantic longing, dour tragedy, or touches of the band's more and more familiar dry sense of humor." Horowitz noted that "her slightly retro, girl group pop features often edgy lyrics that belie the music’s droolingly pretty, perky and persistent melodies." The Guardian's Maddy Costa told that "it's love that's the culprit: love that makes people approaching middle-age gauche as teenagers; love that wraps up heartbreak in happiness – a contradiction Campbell has long embodied, singing acidic lyrics in a sugary voice golden with optimism." Susannah Young of Under the Radar evoked that "typically, Tracyanne Campbell writes Camera Obscura's lyrics from an omniscient narrator's perspective, but even when she gets more personal, there's still a bit of a guarded tone at play." Clark felt that the lyrics are "thoughtful and sardonic", which were done with "a certain tastefulness to this record that is achieved by its potent, thoughtful lyrics that never seem stale or badly written." Ware felt that the "record oozes an elegant stream of sophistication and songwriting".

On the subject of production, Thomas called it "somewhat more clear than previous efforts, relying less on reverb and stuffing the frequency ranges with even more string sections, odd percussion, and pop accents than before." Horowitz called the production "bigger," and "the recording a touch more sophisticated but by and large, it’s all about auteur/lead singer Tracyanne Campbell’s sweet, innocent, succulent vocals." Gill told that the album was "produced in [an] understated manner by Tucker Martine". Ware called it "a rich, clearly well-thought out and measured Tucker Martine production."

== Critical reception ==
Professional ratings
Review scores
Source	Rating
Allmusic	4.5/5 stars
American Songwriter	4/5 stars
Consequence of Sound	4/5 stars
The Guardian	4/5 stars
The Independent	3/5 stars
musicOMH	3/5 stars
Q	4/5 stars
The Skinny	4/5 stars
Slant Magazine	3/5 stars
Under the Radar	8/10 stars

Desire Lines has received generally positive reception from music critics. At Metacritic, they assign a "weighted average" score to ratings and reviews from selected mainstream critics, and the album has a Metascore of 78, which is based on 17 reviews and ratings. At AnyDecentMusic?, they assign a "weighted average", and based on 18 ratings and reviews taken, the album has a rating of 7.3-out-of-ten.

Fred Thomas of Allmusic told that the release contains a "similar feel of a band bounding out of the gates with a renewed creative energy" that he called "some of their best and most confident work to date." At American Songwriter, Hal Horowitz noted that "there aren’t many groups whose fifth album is as riveting as their first, but there also aren’t many groups with a vision as clear, focused and defined as that of Camera Obscura." Consequence of Sound's Bryant Kitching called the effort "breathtaking as its inviting." Maddy Costa of The Guardian claimed that "what feels different this time is the elegance and assurance of the music". At Q, they told that "when slipping downtempo into ballads, Camera Obscura are in a league of their own". Chris Buckle of The Skinny called the album "no shortcut or re-tread; rather, it’s the sound of a band following their hearts, comfortable and confident in their own skin." At Under the Radar, Susannah Young proclaimed that "Desire Lines also sounds richer than any of Camera Obscura's previous albums."

Drowned in Sound's Jon Clark rated the album a nine-out-of-ten, and told that "this is pop music with a real soul to it, and Camera Obscura have bared it magnificently", which he vowed "this record is another perfect gem in their catalogue." At Paste, Evan Rytlewski rated the album an 8.3-out-of-ten, and called the release "another superbly crafted album, well worth the wait", and noted how "Campbell may someday conquer her self doubts, but until then, her restlessness is paying dividends." Melody Lau of Exclaim! rated the album eight-out-of-ten, and wrote that "Desire Lines refurbishes '50s pop, turning it into modern classics filled with unabashedly lovely melodies, just the way Camera Obscura want it, and just what we've come to expect, and love, about them."

At This Is Fake DIY, Gareth Ware rated the album an 8-out-of-ten, and told that the release is "honed and constantly improved, yet retains an aura of warm contentment throughout." Furthermore, Ware wrote that they presented "it as a triumph against adversity may be simplistic and exaggerative, but what is certain is that in the record [...] assured, confident and cohesive as it is [...] Camera Obscura have come up trumps." The A.V. Club's Annie Zaleski graded the album a B−, and affirmed that "Desire Lines is the rare record that sounds comfortable and familiar, but yet isn’t derivative." At Uncut, they rated the album an eight-out-of-ten, and wrote that the "fifth album clothes Campbell's vignettes of thwarted romance in increasingly sophisticated arrangements."

However, Andy Gill of The Independent felt that "the songs' clean pop lines are revealed with the minimum of decorative detail," that is done "most successfully". David Welsh of musicOMH cautioned that "this is at once an enjoyable effort and an opportunity missed." Slant Magazine's Kevin Liedel told that "by no means their best effort," but that "Desire Lines is nevertheless a pleasurable listen."

== Track listing ==
All tracks are written by Tracyanne Campbell.

No.	Title	Length
1.	"Intro"	0:29
2.	"This Is Love (Feels Alright)"	3:30
3.	"Troublemaker"	4:26
4.	"William's Heart"	4:06
5.	"New Year's Resolution"	5:34
6.	"Do It Again"	3:17
7.	"Cri du Coeur"	4:12
8.	"Every Weekday"	4:09
9.	"Fifth in Line to the Throne"	4:26
10.	"I Missed Your Party"	4:26
11.	"Break It to You Gently"	3:47
12.	"Desire Lines"	4:20
Total length:		46:42

Amazon MP3 bonus track
No.	Title	Length
13.	"Swallows"	3:40

iTunes bonus track
No.	Title	Length
13.	"Making Money"	2:31
