= Tracyanne Campbell =

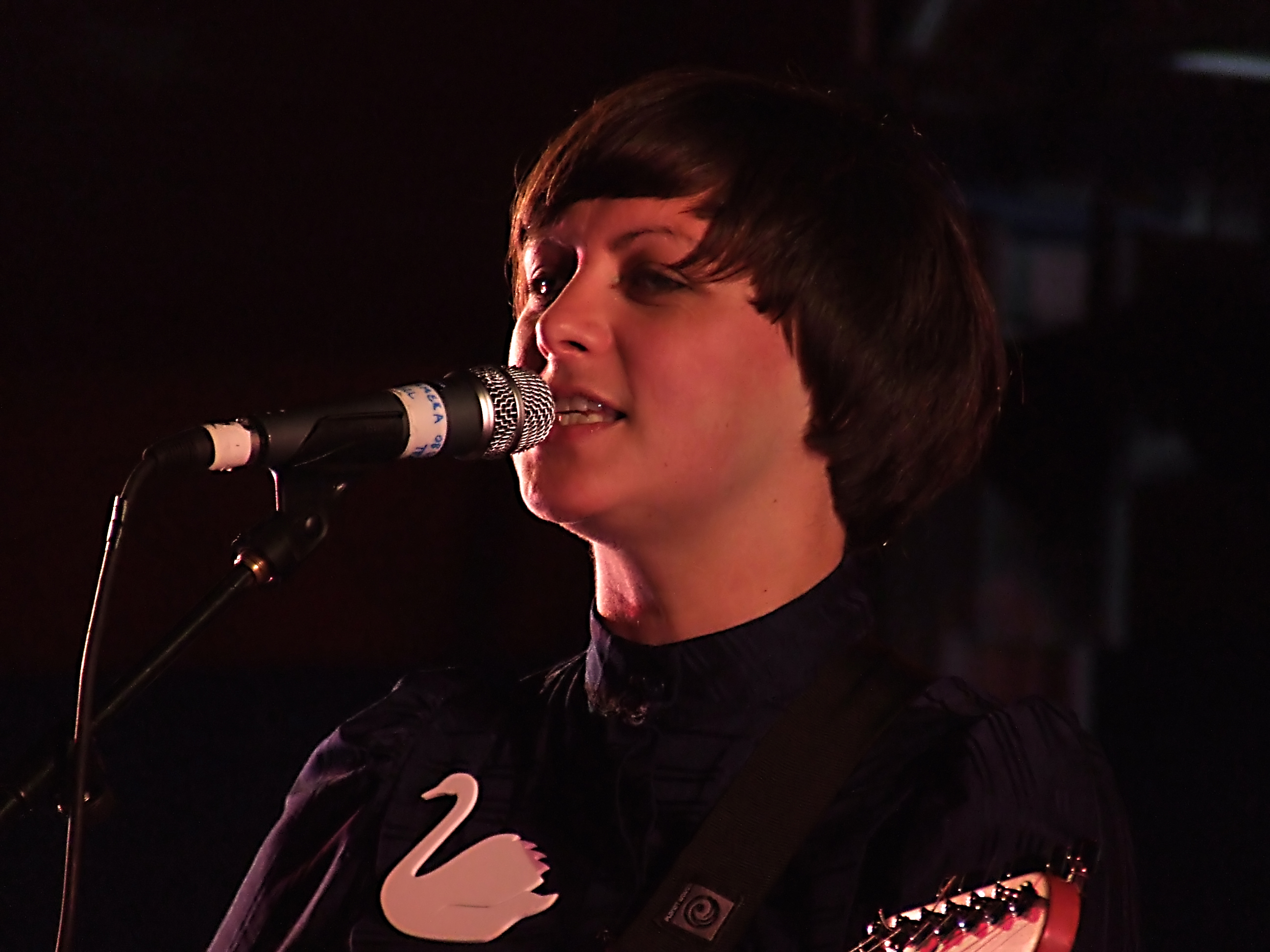
- Campbell performing with Camera Obscura at Electric Picnic, 2007

Background information
- Born: Tracy Anne Campbell; 18 May 1974 (age 52); Uphall, West Lothian, Scotland
- Origin: Glasgow, Scotland
- Genres: Indie pop
- Occupation: Musician
- Instruments: Vocals; guitar
- Years active: 1996–present
- Label: Merge
- Member of: Camera Obscura; Tracyanne & Danny

Tracy Anne Campbell (born 18 May 1974) is a Scottish singer and musician who is the lead vocalist of the Glasgow-based indie pop band Camera Obscura.

== Career ==
Born in Uphall, West Lothian, Campbell founded Camera Obscura alongside John Henderson and Gavin Dunbar in Glasgow in 1996. The band released Biggest Bluest Hi Fi (2001), Underachievers Please Try Harder (2003), Let's Get Out of This Country (2006), My Maudlin Career (2009), Desire Lines (2013), and Look to the East, Look to the West (2024).

The band has collaborated with Tucker Martine, Stuart Murdoch and Peter Bjorn and John.

Campbell has also worked on the project Tracyanne & Danny alongside English musician Danny Coughlan. In May 2018 they released their self-titled studio album on Merge Records.

In 2026 Campbell was featured singing on the song "Bad Husband" which was the third track from the album Ever The Optimist by The Trashcan Sinatras.

== Personal life ==
Campbell dated Stuart Murdoch, the lead vocalist of the band Belle and Sebastian, for three years in the 2000s.

After bandmate and friend Carey Lander died in 2015, Campbell wrote Lander's obituary for the Guardian.
