= Other Worlds (Taken by Trees album) =

Studio album by Taken by Trees
- Released: 2 October 2012
- Genre: Indie pop
- Length: 41:40
- Label: Secretly Canadian
- Producer: Victoria Bergsman; Henning Fürst

Taken by Trees chronology
East of Eden (2009)	Other Worlds (2012)	Yellow to Blue (2018)

Singles from Other Worlds
- 1. "Dreams" Released: 7 August 2012; 2. "Only You" Released: 23 April 2013

Professional ratings
Aggregate scores
Source	Rating
AnyDecentMusic?	7.2/10
Metacritic	78/100
Review scores
Source	Rating
AllMusic	4/5 stars
Mojo	4/5 stars
Pitchfork	7.6/10
PopMatters	7/10
Q	4/5 stars
Uncut	8/10
Under the Radar	8/10

Other Worlds is the third studio album by Taken by Trees, the solo project of Swedish musician Victoria Bergsman. The album was released on 2 October 2012 by Secretly Canadian. The music on the album was inspired by Bergsman's travel to Hawaii.

The song "Dreams" was premiered on NPR's website on 10 July 2012, and a video for the song was released on 25 July. It was subsequently released as a single in digital and 12-inch formats on 7 August. The song "Large" was premiered on Refinery29 on 10 September. The entire Open Worlds album was made available for streaming by The Fader on 24 September.

The video for "Large" premiered on Gorilla vs. Bear on 8 October 2012. On 23 April 2013, "Only You" was released as a two-track digital single, and a video for the song was released two days later.

== Track listing ==
All tracks are written by Victoria Bergsman and Henning Fürst, except where noted.

No.	Title	Writer(s)	Length
1.	"Horizon"	Bergsman; Fredrik Lindson	2:09
2.	"Highest High"		3:26
3.	"Dreams"	Bergsman	4:12
4.	"In Other Words"		3:54
5.	"Not Like Any Other"		3:36
6.	"Pacific Blue"		4:35
7.	"Only You"		3:24
8.	"Large"		3:47
9.	"Indigo Dub"		2:05
10.	"I Want You"		4:13
11.	"Your Place or Mine"	Bergsman; Lindson	4:19
12.	"Dreams (Coconut Cut)"	Bergsman	2:00
Total length:			41:40
