= Boyoubetterunow =

Compilation album by The Concretes
- Released: 2000
- Genre: Indie pop
- Length: 36:55

The Concretes chronology
Lipstick Edition (1999)	Boyoubetterunow (2000)	Nationalgeographic (2001)

Professional ratings
Review scores
Source	Rating
Allmusic	4/5 stars
Pitchfork Media	(7.2/10)

Boyoubetterunow is a compilation by Swedish pop band The Concretes as well as their first major release. The album consists of the band's first two EPs, Limited Edition and Lipstick Edition, both previously released in 1999. It is currently out of print.

== Track listing ==
All music by The Concretes and lyrics by Victoria Bergsman.

1. "Teen Love" – 3:24
2. "Sunsets" – 3:09
3. "Be Mine" – 4:04
4. "Other Ones" – 3:48
5. "Vacation" – 2:02
6. "Recover" – 5:15
7. "Give A Little" – 3:55
8. "The Jeremiad" – 3:31
9. "Cabaret" – 3:18
10. "Tjyven (The Thief)" – 1:40
11. "Contamination" – 2:54
- Tracks 3, 4, 7, 8 and 11 are from Limited Edition. All other tracks are from Lipstick Edition.

== Personnel ==
- Erik Bünger – String Arrangements
- The Concretes – Producer, Design
- Christopher Roth – Producer, Engin
