= Chosen One (The Concretes song) =

Single by The Concretes

from the album In Colour
- Released: 2006 Scandinavian release 6 March 2006 UK release
- Recorded: 2005
- Genre: Indie pop
- Length: 3:08
- Label: Licking Fingers, EMI
- Songwriter(s): Maria Eriksson, Martin Hansson, Ulrik Karlsson, Lisa Milberg, Per Nyström, Ludvig Rylander, Daniel Värjö, Victoria Lena Bergsman
- Producer(s): The Concretes

The Concretes singles chronology
"Lady December" (2004)	"Chosen One" (2006)	"On the Radio" (2006)

"Chosen One" is a song by Swedish band The Concretes from their second album, In Colour. It was released as the lead single from that album in 2006.

== Track listings ==
=== Scandinavian release ===
- CD LFS019
1. "Chosen One" - 3:08
2. "Reverberation" - 2:54
3. "Postpone It" - 3:46

=== UK release ===
- 7" LF019
1. "Chosen One" - 3:08
2. "Reverberation" - 2:54
- 7" LFX019
1. "Chosen One" (demo version)
2. "Postpone It" - 3:46
- CD LFCD019
1. "Chosen One" - 3:08
2. "Reverberation" - 2:54
3. "Postpone It" - 3:46
4. "Chosen One" (video)

== Charts ==
Year	Chart	Position
2006	Sverigetopplistan	46
2006	UK Singles Chart	51
