= Johnossi =

Swedish rock band

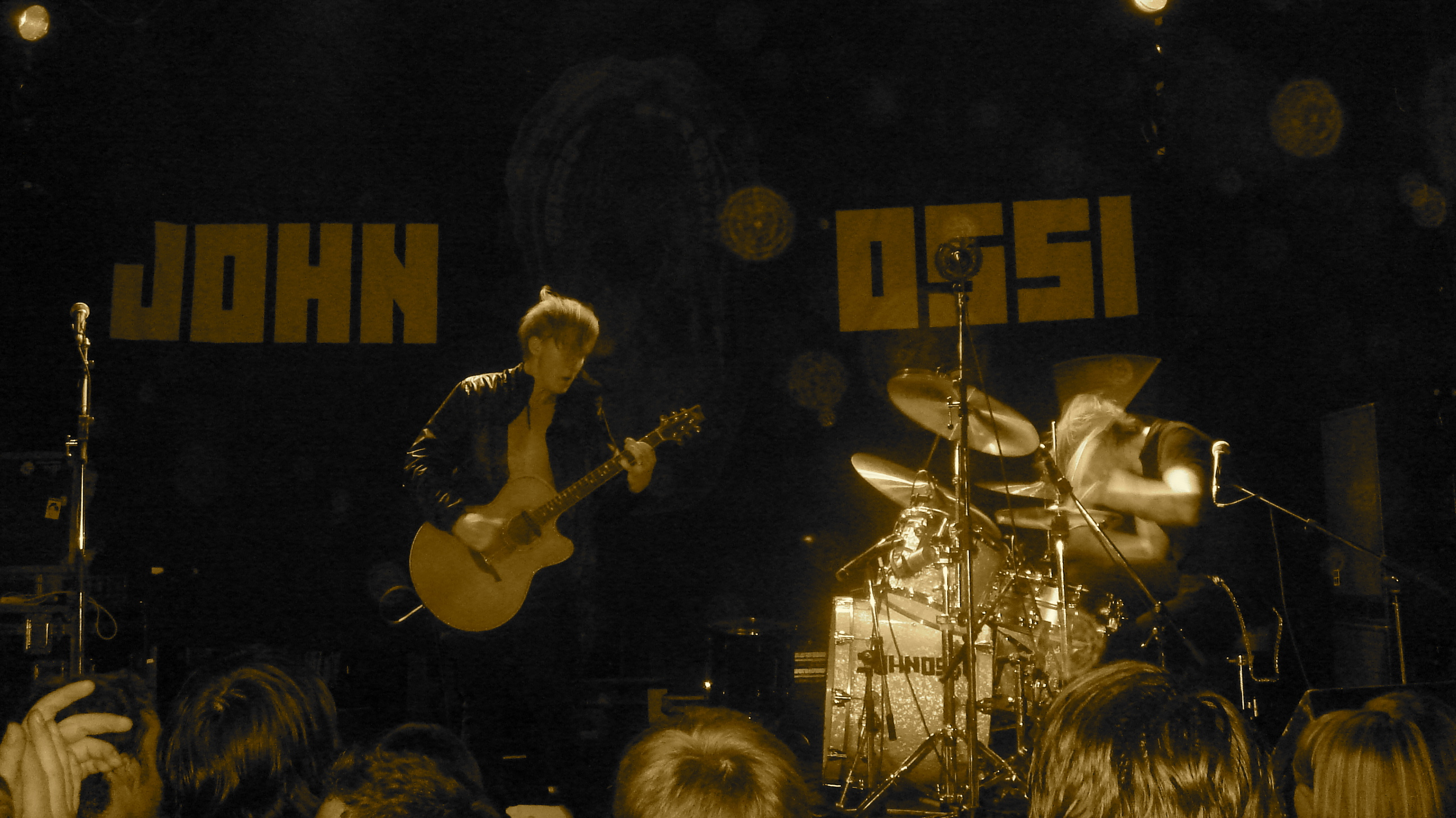

Background information
- Origin: Saltsjöbaden, Stockholm, Sweden
- Genres: Alternative rock, Indie rock
- Labels: Rekord Music, V2 Music Scandinavia, V2 Music, Control Group
- Members: John Engelbert; Oskar "Ossi" Bonde
- Website: www.johnossi.com

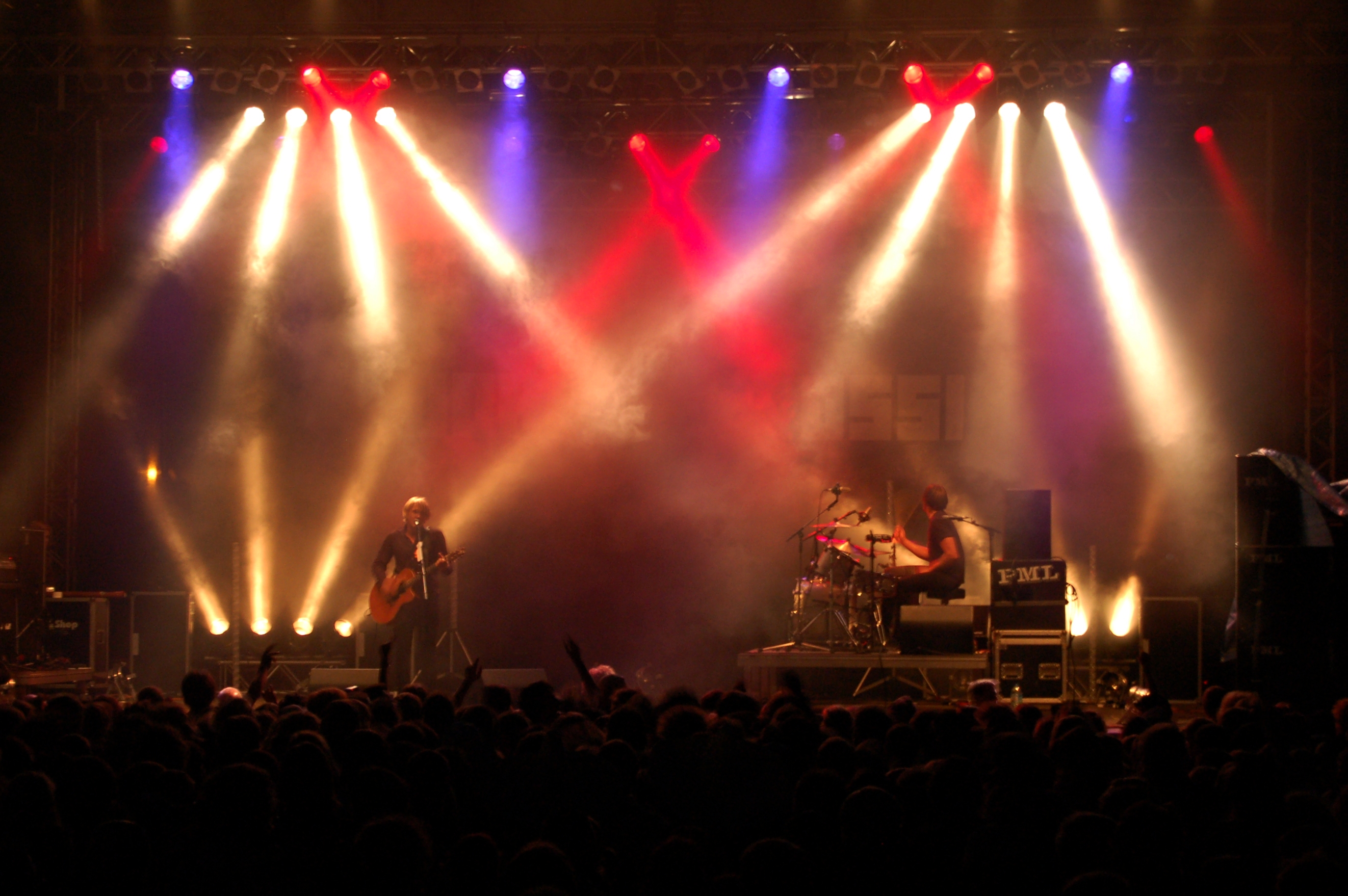
Johnossi at the Mini-Rock-Festival 2008 in Germany

Johnossi is a rock duo from Saltsjöbaden, Stockholm County, Sweden, consisting of songwriter, singer, guitarist John Engelbert and drummer, percussionist, singer Oskar "Ossi" Bonde.

== History ==
Engelbert and Bonde first met when they were 12 and 15 years old, respectively, and started playing together as a duo in 2004. They recorded their first album after only five months as a band, and with only three live shows to their credit. Their self-titled first album was released in January 2005 by a small Swedish indie label; it was rereleased in September 2006 by V2 Music with an additional three tracks.

Their second album, All They Ever Wanted, had its Scandinavian and Western European release in April 2008, followed by a Japanese release in 2009.

Johnossi has toured extensively in Sweden and Western Europe, both alone and with other Swedish bands such as The Soundtrack of Our Lives, Mando Diao and Sibling Sense. They also toured the US in 2007 with Shout Out Louds. In 2009, they made their first appearances in Japan, supporting The Hives.

In June 2010, the band supported Green Day at Ullevi in their home country.

In 2016 "Into the Wild" was used in the USA Network remake of Eyewitness as the opening song.

== Musical style ==
Their music is characterized by a full guitar sound supported by Engelbert's unorthodox guitar rig and myriad effects pedals, and Bonde's straightforward beats; studio releases often feature colorful percussion accents on instruments such as tambourine, woodblock, guiro, and chimes. A variety of musical styles appear in their work, from hard rock, to blues riffs, post-punk, and even gloom-pop, though lyrical themes are almost uniformly personal and slightly angsty. Their 2020 release "Torch // Flame" showed a continued expansion of their sound and themes, with "a sense that each song has the potential to end up in an entirely different musical world than the last."

== Media reference ==
- A cover version of "Santa Monica Bay" was used in a commercial for the Scandinavian teen clothing chain "J-Store".
- "Bobby" appears in the film Four Dimensions.
- "Execution Song" appears in the 2008 German film The Wave ("Die Welle").
- "Execution Song" appears on the video game NHL 09.
- "There's a Lot of Things to Do Before You Die" appears in the 2006 Swedish film When Darkness Falls ("När mörkret faller")
- An instrumental version of their song "Mavericks" was used in a promotional trailer for The Guest.
- "Air Is Free" appears on the video games Dirt 4 and NHL 18.

== Members ==
- John Engelbert – vocals, guitar
- Oskar "Ossi" Bonde – drums, percussion, backing vocals

== Discography ==
=== Albums ===
Year	Album	Peak positions		
Year	Album	SWE	SWI	GER
2006/ 2007	Johnossi: Date released: 2006 / 2007; Record labels: Rekord Musik; V2 Music Scandinavia; Control Group	33	—	—
2008	All They Ever Wanted: Date released: 2008; Record label: Universal	11	—	68
2010	Mavericks: Date released: 2010; Record label: Universal	4	54	51
2013	Transitions: Date released: 23 March 2013; Record label: Universal	5	—	81
2017	Blood Jungle: Date released: 17 February 2017; Record label: Universal	7	46	51
2020	Torch // Flame: Date released: 28 February 2020; Record label: BMG	27	—	—
2022	Mad Gone Wild: Date released: 11 February 2022; Record label: BMG	—	—	—
2024	Forevers: Date released: 27 September 2024; Record label: Universal Music Sweden	9	—	—

=== EPs ===
- 2006 Execution Song (EP), V2 Music Scandinavia
- 2016 Air Is Free (EP), Universal
- 2017 Live In Berlin (EP), Bud Fox Recordings

=== Singles ===
Year	Single	Peak positions	Album
Year	Single	SWE	Album
2008	"Party with My Pain"	—	All They Ever Wanted
2010	"What's the Point"	20	Mavericks
2010	"Dead End"	58	Mavericks
2016	"Air Is Free"	—	Blood Jungle
2022	"Anxious Angel"	22	Non-album singles
2022	"Dina ord"	— (Note: "Dina ord" did not enter the Swedish Singellista Chart, but peaked at number six on the Swedish Heatseeker Chart.)	Non-album singles
2022	"Heroes"	— (Note: "Heroes" did not enter the Swedish Singellista Chart, but peaked at number eight on the Swedish Heatseeker Chart.)	Non-album singles
2024	"Känns så längesen" (with Lars Winnerbäck)	65	Non-album singles
