= My Maudlin Career =

Studio album by Camera Obscura
- Released: 20 April 2009
- Recorded: Atlantis Studio, Konst & Ramar Studio, and Cosmos Studio; Stockholm, Sweden
- Genre: Indie pop
- Length: 46:24
- Label: 4AD
- Producer: Jari Haapalainen

Camera Obscura chronology
Let's Get Out of This Country (2006)	My Maudlin Career (2009)	Desire Lines (2013)

Singles from My Maudlin Career
- 1. "French Navy" Released: 13 April 2009; 2. "Honey in the Sun" Released: August 2009; 3. "Sweetest Thing" Released: 2 November 2009; 4. "The Blizzard / Swans" Released: 7 December 2009

My Maudlin Career is the fourth studio album by the Scottish indie pop band Camera Obscura. The album was made available for streaming on 14 April 2009, before being released on 20 April via 4AD. Like its predecessor, the album was produced by Jari Haapalainen of The Bear Quartet. The string and horn arrangements are by Björn Yttling, of Peter Bjorn and John.

== Critical reception ==
Professional ratings
Aggregate scores
Source	Rating
AnyDecentMusic?	7.8/10
Metacritic	80/100
Review scores
Source	Rating
AllMusic	4/5 stars
The A.V. Club	B−
The Daily Telegraph	3/5 stars
The Irish Times	4/5 stars
Mojo	4/5 stars
NME	9/10
The Observer	4/5 stars
Pitchfork	8.3/10
Q	4/5 stars
Spin	7/10

The critical response to My Maudlin Career was generally positive. At Metacritic, which assigns a normalized rating out of 100 reviews from mainstream critics, the album has received a favorable score of 80, based on 25 reviews.

Music critic Tim Sendra of AllMusic called the album "almost an exact copy of their previous album" but added "Really, the group could go on remaking it for years to negligible complaints from their fans and very few diminishing returns." Gareth Grundy of The Observer called the album more polished and poised than the band's previous work. Kevin Liedel of Slant Magazine wrote "The result is not nearly as novel or dorkishly handsome as Country, but it still manages to exude addictive gorgeousness... Luckily, for both the album and its audience, the band's perseverance results in hits more often than misses." In his review for Pitchfork, Brian Howe called the string arrangements out of control but praised the album, writing "it sounds more assertive and agile, with increased swing and soul, than ever before. There are still melodies of heart-wrenching simplicity that stick in your head to an almost irritating degree (beware of the dangerously catchy "James"), balanced by songs with longer, more complex and limber melodic phrases."

== Track listing ==
All songs written by Tracyanne Campbell.

No.	Title	Length
1.	"French Navy"	3:19
2.	"The Sweetest Thing"	4:23
3.	"You Told a Lie"	3:45
4.	"Away with Murder"	4:08
5.	"Swans"	4:09
6.	"James"	3:50
7.	"Careless Love"	4:35
8.	"My Maudlin Career"	4:19
9.	"Forests and Sands"	4:16
10.	"Other Towns and Cities"	3:59
11.	"Honey in the Sun"	5:45
Total length:		46:24

=== Australian tour edition bonus tracks ===
12. "The World Is Full Of Strangers"
13. "You're the Only Star in My Blue Heaven"
14. "French Navy (Jim Noir remix)"
15. "Tougher Than The Rest"
16. "The Blizzard"

== Singles ==
- "French Navy" (April 13, 2009)
  - CD (BAD 2912 CD) b/w: "You're the Only Star in My Blue Heaven" / "French Navy" (Jim Noir Remix)
  - 7" vinyl (AD 2912) b/w: "The World Is Full of Strangers"
- "Honey in the Sun" (August 2009)
  - Promo-only CD: Radio Edit / Album Version / Instrumental
- "The Sweetest Thing" (November 2, 2009)
  - 7" vinyl (AD 2926) b/w: "Tougher Than the Rest" (Bruce Springsteen cover)
- "The Blizzard" / "Swans" (December 7, 2009)
  - 7" vinyl (AD 2937): "The Blizzard" / "Swans"
- "The Nights Are Cold" / "The Sweetest Thing [Richard Hawley Remix]" (May 17, 2010)
  - 7" vinyl (AD 3X25)

== Chart performance ==
The album reached number 32 on the UK Albums Chart after one week of sales. It also broke into the Billboard Top 100 in the US, peaking at number 87. In Scotland, the album reached number 37.

== Personnel ==
- Tracyanne Campbell – vocals, guitar
- Carey Lander – organ, piano
- Kenny McKeeve – guitar, background vocals
- Gavin Dunbar – bass
- Lee Thomson – drums
- Britta Persson – background vocals
- Erik Arvinder – violin
- Jessica Hugosson – violin
- Santiago Jiménez – violín
- Andreas Forsman – violin
- Christopher Öhman – viola
- Anna Dager – cello
- Anna Landberg Dager – cello
- Per "Texas" Johansson – horn
- Stefan Persson – trumpet

Production notes:

- Jari Haapalainen – producer, engineer
- Henrik Jonsson – engineer
- Pontus Olsson – engineer
- Johan Rude – engineer
- Björn Yttling – arranger, horn arrangements, string arrangements
- Julie Annis – artwork, layout design
- Donald Milne – photography
