= In Colour (The Concretes album) =

Studio album by The Concretes
- Released: 13 March 2006 (UK); 4 April 2006 (US)
- Recorded: 2005
- Genre: Indie pop
- Length: 45:06
- Label: Licking Fingers, EMI, Astralwerks
- Producer: Mike Mogis

The Concretes chronology
Layourbattleaxedown (2005)	In Colour (2006)	Hey Trouble (2007)

Professional ratings
Review scores
Source	Rating
AllMusic	4/5 stars
Pitchfork Media	4.7/10
Q	(#237, Apr. 06, p. 113)

In Colour is the second album by the Swedish band The Concretes. The album was released 13 March 2006 in the UK and 4 April 2006 in the US.

== Track listing ==
All tracks written by Victoria Bergsman and The Concretes, except where noted.

1. "On the Radio" – 3:23
2. "Sunbeams" (Bergsman, The Concretes, Maria Eriksson, Lisa Milberg) – 3:24
3. "Change in the Weather" – 2:53
4. "Chosen One" – 3:09
5. "Your Call" (The Concretes, Milberg) – 3:29
6. "Fiction" (Bergsman, The Concretes, Milberg) – 6:01
7. "Tomorrow" (Bergsman) – 3:44
8. "As Four" (Bergsman) – 2:32
9. "Grey Days" (The Concretes, Milberg) – 4:42
10. "A Way of Life" – 5:01
11. "Ooh La La" (Bergsman, The Concretes, Milberg) – 2:59
12. "Song for the Songs" (The Concretes, Milberg) – 3:49

== Charts ==
Chart performance for In Colour
Chart (2006)	Peak position
Swedish Albums (Sverigetopplistan)	24
UK Albums (OCC)	89

== Release details ==
Country	Date	Label	Format	Catalog
United Kingdom	13 March 2006	EMI, Licking Fingers	LP	LF020 / 0946 3 49631 1 4
United Kingdom	13 March 2006	EMI, Licking Fingers	CD	LFCD020 / 0946 3 58097 2 5
United States	4 April 2006	Astralwerks	CD	ASW-54059 / 0946 3 54059 2 7
