= You Can't Hurry Love (Concretes song) =

Single by The Concretes

from the album The Concretes
- Released: 2003 Scandinavian release 14 June 2004 UK release
- Recorded: 2003
- Genre: Indie pop
- Label: Licking Fingers
- Songwriters: Maria Eriksson, Martin Hansson, Ulrik Karlsson, Lisa Milberg, Per Nyström, Ludvig Rylander, Daniel Värjö, Victoria Lena Bergsman,
- Producer: Jari Haapalainen

The Concretes singles chronology
"Forces" (2002)	"You Can't Hurry Love" (2003)	"Warm Night" (2003)

"You Can't Hurry Love" is a song by Swedish band The Concretes from their debut album The Concretes. Its original Scandinavian release as a single was in 2003. It was re-released in the United Kingdom on 14 June 2004. There are two videos for the song: 1) an animated version directed by Lisa Milberg and Liselotte Watkins with illustrations by Liselotte Watkins and Marika Åkerblom, animated by Måns Swanberg; 2) the second version directed by photographer Thomas Klementsson is made up of stills.

== Track listings ==
=== 2003 Scandinavian release ===
- CD LFCD005
1. "You Can't Hurry Love" - 2:01
2. "Miss You" - 3:50

=== 2004 UK release ===
- 7" LF7011
1. "You Can’t Hurry Love" - 2:01
2. "Under Your Leaves" - 3:26
- CD LFS011
1. "You Can’t Hurry Love" - 2:01
2. "Free Ride" - 3:43
3. "Under Your Leaves" - 3:26
4. "You Can't Hurry Love" (video)

== Charts ==
Year	Chart	Position
2004	UK Singles Chart	55
