= Camera Obscura (band) =

Scottish indie pop band

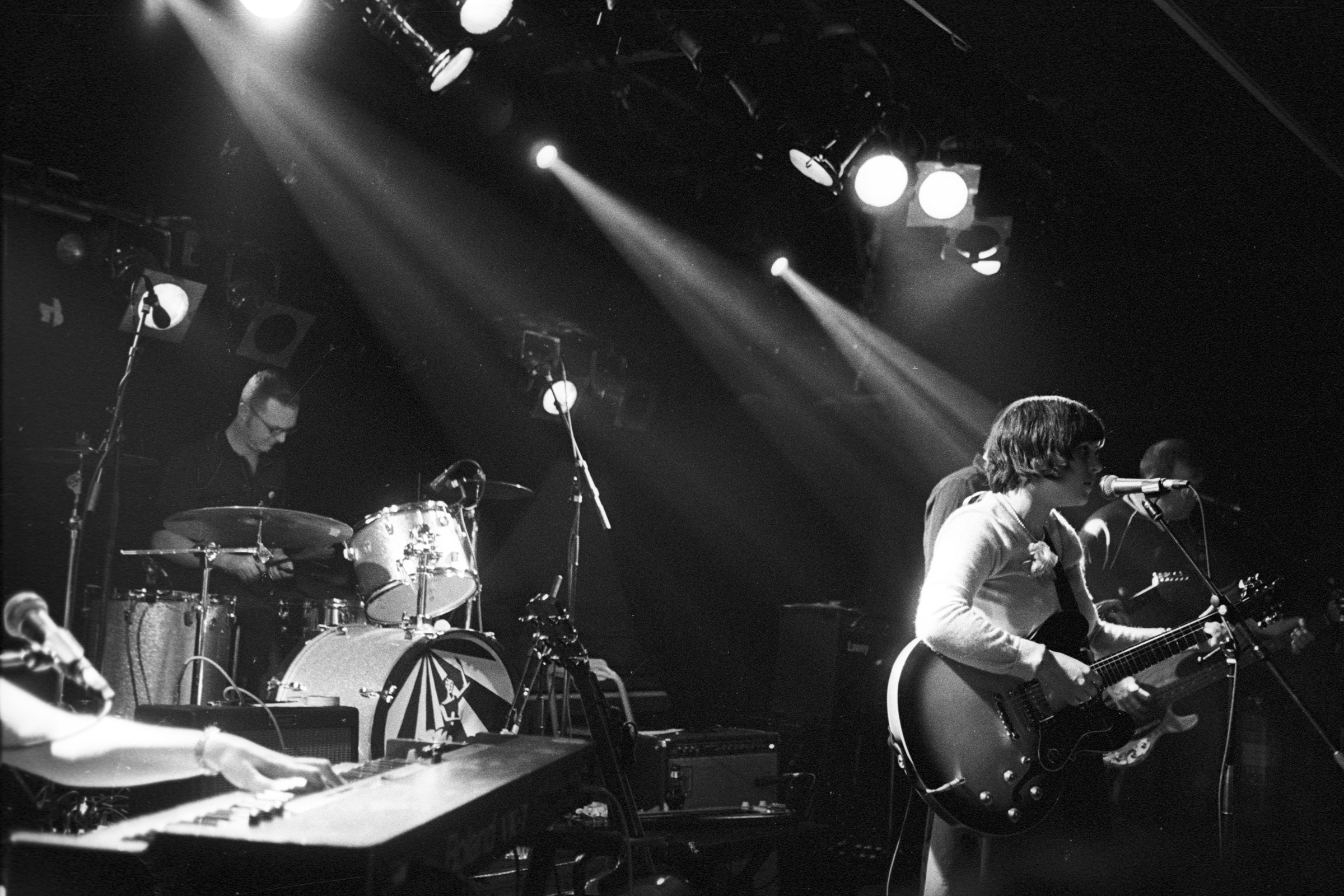
- Camera Obscura performing in 2005

Background information
- Origin: Glasgow, Scotland
- Genre: Indie pop
- Years active: 1996–2015; 2018–present
- Labels: 4AD; Andmoresound; Elefant; Merge
- Members: Tracyanne Campbell; Gavin Dunbar; Kenny McKeeve; Lee Thomson; Donna Maciocia
- Past members: Carey Lander; John Henderson; Richard Colburn; David Skirving; Lindsay Boyd; Nigel Baillie
- Website: camera-obscura.net

Camera Obscura are a Scottish indie pop band from Glasgow. The group formed in 1996, and have released six studio albums to date. Led by primary singer and songwriter Tracyanne Campbell, the band consists of guitarist/vocalist Kenny McKeeve, bassist Gavin Dunbar, and drummer Lee Thomson. Following the death of long-serving keyboardist Carey Lander, the band went on hiatus from 2015 to 2018. After reuniting in 2019 and adding Donna Maciocia as a permanent member, Camera Obscura released their first new album in 11 years, Look to the East, Look to the West, to critical acclaim.

The band's music has been frequently categorized as "twee pop", and garnered comparisons to fellow Scottish band Belle and Sebastian. AllMusic has the band classed as simply indie pop. Other styles incorporated into the band's repertoire include country rock, 1960s pop, Northern soul and girl group. The band's lyrics explore themes such as heartbreak, romance and escapism.

== History ==
Camera Obscura were formed in 1996 by Tracyanne Campbell, John Henderson and Gavin Dunbar. Several other members performed with the band before David Skirving joined as a permanent guitarist. Their first releases were the singles "Park and Ride" and "Your Sound" in 1998. The band's line-up changed in 2000 and 2001 when Lee Thomson joined as its permanent drummer, Lindsay Boyd joined as a keyboard player, and Skirving left and was replaced by Kenny McKeeve.

Camera Obscura's first album, Biggest Bluest Hi Fi, was released in 2001. The tracks Eighties Fan and Anti-Western were produced by Stuart Murdoch of Belle & Sebastian and was supported by John Peel. The first single from the album, "Eighties Fan", came in at number eight in the Festive Fifty in 2001, and charted in several independent music charts.

=== Carey Lander era ===
Nigel Baillie joined the band as a trumpeter and percussionist in 2002 and Carey Lander replaced Boyd. In the summer of 2002, Peel asked the band to do their first Peel session.

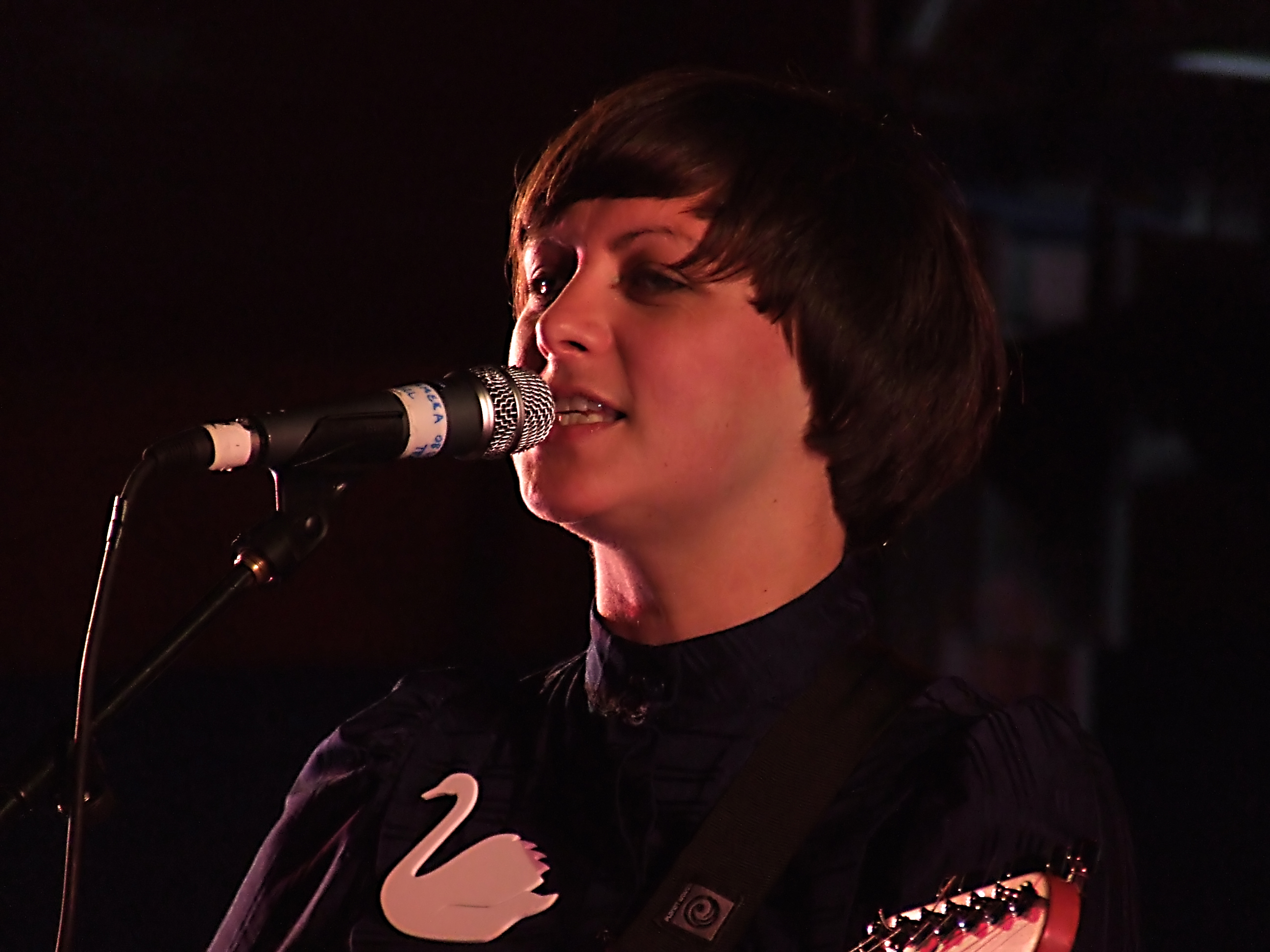
Tracyanne Campbell in 2007

The band's second album, Underachievers Please Try Harder, was released in 2003 and was followed by Camera Obscura's first full tour of Great Britain and Ireland and the band's first tour of the United States. Founding member John Henderson left Camera Obscura following this tour. In early 2004 the band recorded the songs "I Love My Jean" and "Red, Red Rose" following their third Peel session, in which Peel had asked them to put these poems by Robert Burns to music.

Camera Obscura recorded their third album, Let's Get Out of This Country, in Sweden over the course of two weeks with producer Jari Haapalainen. The album was released on 6 June 2006. The first single, "Lloyd, I'm Ready to Be Heartbroken", is an answer song to Lloyd Cole and the Commotions' song "Are You Ready to Be Heartbroken?"; it appears during the opening credits of the 2007 film, P.S. I Love You. The title song was featured in episode 5 of Friday Night Lights.

In February 2009 the band announced they had signed with 4AD. The new album, My Maudlin Career, was released in April 2009, and preceded by the first single "French Navy". London-based jewellery brand Tatty Devine created brooches and necklaces to coincide with the launch. The album was the band's first UK Top 40 success, and it also reached the top 40 in Ireland and the US Billboard 200. Around this time, the band announced that "due to family commitments (including being a proud dad) Nigel will no longer be a full time member of Camera Obscura".

On 18 April 2009, Camera Obscura released a special edition Record Store Day 7" called "French Navy" for independent record stores. "French Navy" was also used by Echo Falls, who are the sponsors of Come Dine with Me, at the start of each episode and during commercial breaks. Their album Desire Lines was produced by Tucker Martine and released by 4AD on 3 June 2013.

In 2015, the band cancelled planned gigs in North America due to the illness of Carey Lander. She was first diagnosed with osteosarcoma in 2011. She announced in 2015 that it had returned. Lander set up a JustGiving page for Sarcoma UK in order to raise awareness to the illness and lack of funding for research and treatment, and as of August 2024, the sum of donations is over £103,000. Carey Lander died on 11 October 2015.

In May 2018, while Campbell was promoting the self-titled debut album of Tracyanne & Danny, her new project with Danny Coughlan, she noted that she still kept in touch with the other members of Camera Obscura in the wake of Lander's passing, but the future of the band remained undiscussed. The song "Alabama" from the Tracyanne & Danny album is Campbell's tribute to Lander.

=== 2018 return ===
On 5 September 2018, Camera Obscura returned to live performance as part of the Boaty Weekender, a cruise festival curated by Belle & Sebastian sailing from Barcelona to Cagliari on 8–12 August 2019. Prior to participating in the Boaty Weekender, the band announced a warm-up show at Saint Luke's & The Winged Ox in Glasgow on 5 August with proceeds donated to the Prince and Princess of Wales Hospice in memory of Carey Lander. After tickets for the show were sold out, the band added a second date with proceeds also being donated. For these shows and the Boaty Weekender, the band brought in Donna Maciocia, formerly of Amplifico, to accompany the band on keyboards and backing vocals.

The band confirmed in May 2020 that they were preparing a new album, but had been forced to delay recording it due to the COVID-19 pandemic. On 23 April 2022, the band released a new compilation album, Making Money, containing "hard-to-find B-sides", covers, a session recording and two remixes. The release was dedicated to the memory of previous band member Carey Lander

On 15 November 2023, the band announced 2024 tour dates, adding there would be "some new music" in support of it. In January 2024, the band announced their sixth studio album Look to the East, Look to the West. It was released on 3 May 2024. To coincide with the announcement, the album's lead single "Big Love" was released.

== Members ==
=== Current members ===
- Tracyanne Campbell – lead vocals, guitar (1996–2015, 2018–present), percussion (1996–2004)
- Gavin Dunbar – bass (1996–2015, 2018–present)
- Lee Thomson – drums (2000–2015, 2018–present)
- Kenny McKeeve – guitar, backing vocals (2001–2015, 2018–present)
- Donna Maciocia – keyboards, backing vocals (2023–present; touring musician 2019)

=== Former members ===
- John Henderson – lead and backing vocals, percussion (1996–2004)
- David Skirving – guitar, backing vocals (1998–2001)
- Richard Colburn – drums (1998–2000)
- Lindsay Boyd – keyboards (2000–2002)
- Nigel Baillie – trumpet, percussion (2002–2009)
- Carey Lander – piano, keyboards, backing vocals (2002–2015; died 2015)

=== Former touring musicians ===
- Frànçois Marry – trumpet, percussion, guitar (2003–2009)

== Discography ==
=== Albums ===
List of albums, with selected details and peak chart positions
Title	Album details	Peak chart positions		
Title	Album details	UK	IRE	US
Biggest Bluest Hi Fi	Released: 12 November 2001; Label: Andmoresound (and 17); Formats: CD, LP; Reissued in 2002 on Elefant (ER-1090); Reissued in 2004 on Merge (MRG256)	—	—	—
Underachievers Please Try Harder	Released: 15 September 2003; Label: Elefant (ER-1104) (Europe) Merge (MRG239) (North America); Formats: CD, LP, DL	—	—	—
Let's Get Out of This Country	Released: 6 June 2006; Label: Merge (MRG276) (North America) Elefant (ER-1123) (Europe); Formats: CD, 2CD, LP, DL	125	—	—
My Maudlin Career	Released: 20 April 2009; Label: 4AD (CAD 2907); Formats: CD, LP, DL	32	37	87
Desire Lines	Released: 3 June 2013; Label: 4AD (CAD3314); Formats: CD, LP, DL	39	66	106
Look to the East, Look to the West	Released: 3 May 2024; Label: Merge (MRG839); Formats: CD, LP, DL	36	—	—
"—" denotes a release that did not chart or was not issued in that region.

=== Compilations and EPs ===
- Rare UK Bird (December 1999, Quattro) Japan-only
- 4AD Sessions EP (19 April 2014, 4AD) Record Store Day
- Making Money (23 April 2022, 4AD) Record Store Day

=== Singles ===
List of singles
Title	Release date	Release info	Formats	Peak chart positions	Album
Title	Release date	Release info	Formats	UK	Album
"Park and Ride"	2 March 1998	Andmoresound (and 09)	7" vinyl	—	Non-album singles
"Your Sound"	14 December 1998	Andmoresound (and 11)	CD, 7" vinyl	—	Non-album singles
"Eighties Fan"	25 June 2001	Andmoresound (and 16)	CD, 7" vinyl	—	Biggest Bluest Hi Fi
"Teenager"	26 May 2003	Elefant (ER-352)	CD	182	Underachievers Please Try Harder
"Keep It Clean"	28 June 2004	Elefant (ER-355)	CD	—	Underachievers Please Try Harder
"I Love My Jean"	21 March 2005	Elefant (ER-358)	CD, 7" vinyl	101	Non-album single
"Lloyd, I'm Ready to Be Heartbroken"	15 May 2006	Elefant (ER-362)	CD, 7" vinyl	124	Let's Get Out of This Country
"Let's Get Out of This Country"	11 September 2006	Elefant (ER-364)	CD, 7" vinyl	144	Let's Get Out of This Country
"If Looks Could Kill"	29 January 2007	Elefant (ER-366)	CD, 7" vinyl	191	Let's Get Out of This Country
"Tears for Affairs"	23 April 2007	Elefant (ER-368)	CD, 7" vinyl	—	Let's Get Out of This Country
"French Navy"	13 April 2009	4AD (AD 2912)	CD, 7" vinyl	141	My Maudlin Career
"Honey in the Sun"	August 2009	4AD (EAD 2929 S)	Promo-only CDR	—	My Maudlin Career
"The Sweetest Thing"	2 November 2009	4AD (AD 2926)	7" vinyl	—	My Maudlin Career
"The Blizzard"/"Swans"	7 December 2009	4AD (AD 2937)	7" vinyl	—	My Maudlin Career
"The Nights Are Cold"	17 May 2010	4AD (AD 3X25)	7" vinyl	—	Non-album single
"Do It Again"	May 2013	4AD	Free download	—	Desire Lines
"Break It to You Gently" / "Do It Again"	October 2013	4AD	7" vinyl	—	Desire Lines
"Troublemaker"	October 2013	4AD	CD	—	Desire Lines
"—" denotes a release that did not chart.

=== Other contributions ===
- Acoustic 07 (2007, V2 Records) – "Let's Get Out of This Country"
- The Saturday Sessions: The Dermot O'Leary Show (2007, EMI) – "Super Trouper"

== See also ==
- List of bands and musicians from Glasgow
- List of Scottish musicians
