= Taken by Trees =

Solo musical project

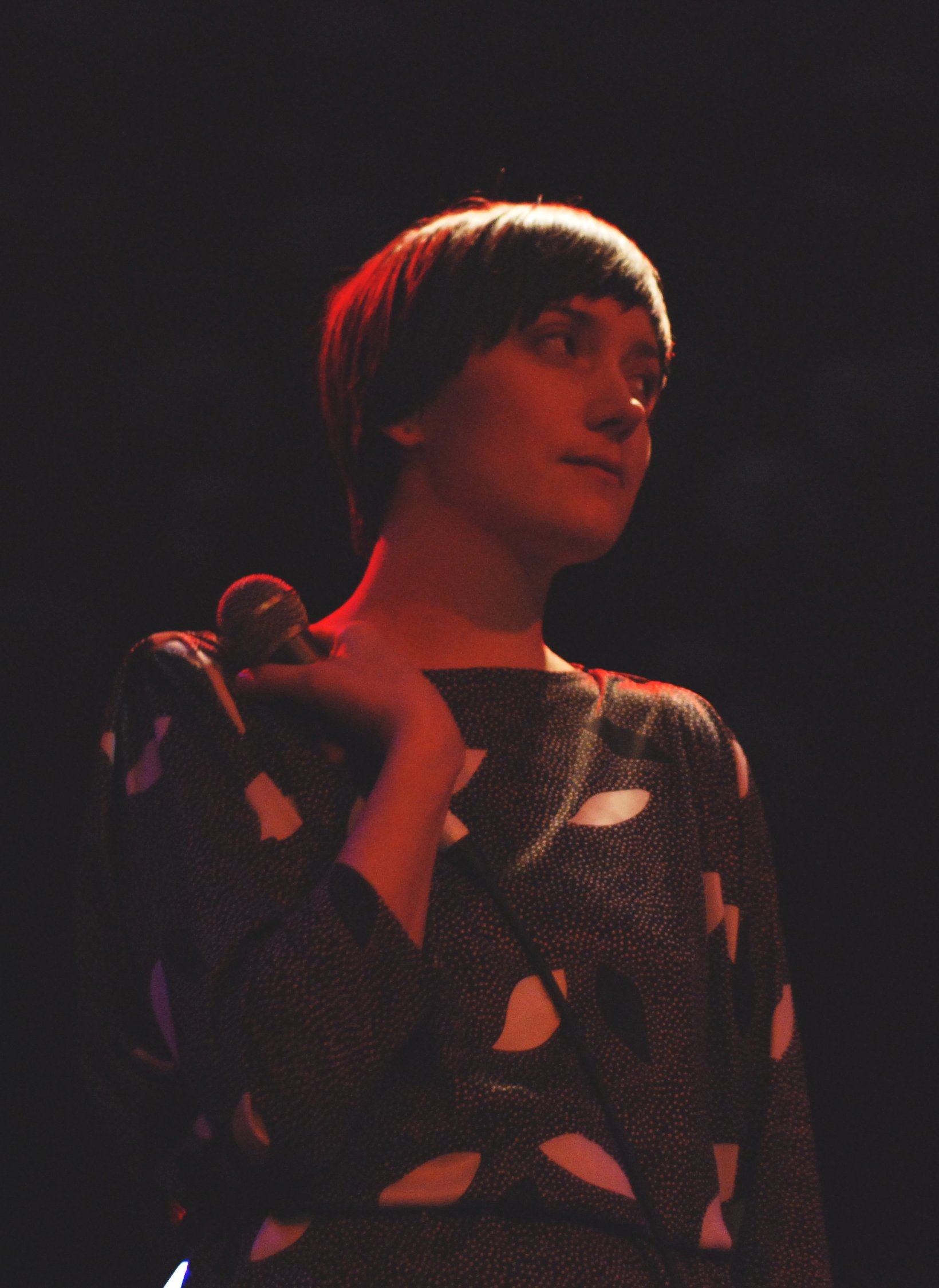
- Victoria Bergsman performing as Taken by Trees, 2007

Background information
- Origin: Sweden
- Genres: Indie pop, experimental pop, electronica, Dub, lo-fi, freak folk
- Years active: 2006–present
- Labels: Rough Trade (EU); Eleven: A Music Company (US); Secretly Canadian
- Spinoff of: The Concretes
- Members: Victoria Bergsman
- Website: Official site

Taken by Trees is the solo project of Victoria Bergsman, former lead singer for the Concretes. The act's debut album Open Field was released on 18 June 2007. Four demo songs ("Tell Me", "Too Young", "Lost and Found" and "Hours Pass Like Centuries") had previously been recorded under the production of Björn Yttling and were available on the band's official website beginning on 13 September 2006. The second Taken by Trees album, East of Eden, was available for streaming on Drowned in Sound, and was released on 7 September 2009 in the U.K., and the next day in the U.S. When recording the album, Taken by Trees retreated to Pakistan and recruited a cast of amateur musicians which are heard on East of Eden.

In November 2009, a cover version of Guns N' Roses hit "Sweet Child o' Mine" was used in the John Lewis Christmas advert. It was announced that the version would be released as their next U.K. single. It was also used in the promotional trailers for the 2009 remake of The Last House on the Left. The song was also used in the final scene for the 2010 film, Life as We Know It.

Taken by Trees was signed by record label Secretly Canadian in February 2012. In October 2012, Bergsman's third studio album, Other Worlds, inspired by a trip to Hawaii, was released. On 8 October 2012, Gorilla vs. Bear released the music video for "Large", a highlight on Other Worlds. In 2018, Yellow to Blue, was released by ART:ERY / Shir Records.

== Discography ==
=== Studio albums ===
| Year | Album details | Peak chart positions |
| Year | Album details | SWE |
|---|---|---|
| 2007 | Open Field: Debut studio album; Release date: 18 June 2007; Label: Rough Trade | 56 |
| 2009 | East of Eden: 2nd studio album; Release date: 7 September 2009; Label: Rough Trade | 43 |
| 2012 | Other Worlds: 3rd studio album; Release date: 2 October 2012; Label: Secretly Canadian | |
| 2018 | Yellow to Blue: 4th studio album; Release date: 4 May 2018; Label: ART:ERY / Shir Records | |
| 2022 | Another Year: 5th studio album; Release date: 9 December 2022; Label: Rough Trade | |

=== Singles ===
| Year | Single | Peak positions | Album |
| Year | Single | UK | Album |
|---|---|---|---|
| 2007 | "Lost & Found" | - | Open Field |
| 2009 | "Sweet Child o' Mine" | 23 | Non Album |
| 2012 | "Dreams" 12" | - | Other Worlds |

== Compilations ==
- Four Songs by Arthur Russell (2007)
