= Biggest Bluest Hi Fi =

Biggest Bluest Hi-Fi

Studio album by Camera Obscura
- Released: November 12, 2001
- Genre: Indie pop
- Label: Andmoresound
- Producer: Stuart Murdoch

Camera Obscura chronology
Biggest Bluest Hi-Fi (2001)	Underachievers Please Try Harder (2003)

Biggest Bluest Hi-Fi is the debut LP from the indie pop band Camera Obscura. It was released in 2001 by Andmoresound and in 2002 by Elefant, then re-released in 2004 by Merge.

== Reception ==
Professional ratings
Review scores
Source	Rating
AllMusic	4/5 stars
Pitchfork	7.5/10

Writing for AllMusic, critic Tim Sendra praised the album, writing that it "makes a strong case for Camera Obscura as one of the best indie pop bands to come down the pike since, well, Belle and Sebastian." Marc Hogan of Pitchfork called it "charmingly understated."

== Track listing ==
All tracks are written by Tracyanne Campbell.

No.	Title	Length
1.	"Happy New Year"	4:03
2.	"Eighties Fan"	4:20
3.	"Houseboat"	3:22
4.	"Pen and Notebook"	3:26
5.	"Swimming Pool"	3:56
6.	"Anti-Western"	3:08
7.	"I Don't Do Crowds"	3:55
8.	"The Sun on His Back"	2:50
9.	"Double Feature"	5:50
10.	"Arrangements of Shapes and Space"	3:48
Total length:		38:38

=== 2002 and 2004 re-releases ===
1. "Happy New Year"
2. "Eighties Fan"
3. "Houseboat"
4. "Shine Like a New Pin"
5. "Pen and Notebook"
6. "Swimming Pool"
7. "Anti-Western"
8. "Let's Go Bowling"
9. "I Don't Do Crowds"
10. "The Sun on His Back"
11. "Double Feature"
12. "Arrangements of Shapes and Space"

== Personnel ==
=== Band ===
- Tracyanne Campbell – vocals, guitar
- Gavin Dunbar – bass
- John Henderson – vocals, percussion
- Kenny Mckeeve – guitar, mandolin, vocals
- Lee Thomson – drums
- Lindsay Boyd – keyboards

=== Other ===
- Arranged By [Strings] – Camera Obscura, Stuart Murdoch
- Bells [Sleighbells] – Geoff Allan
- Design, Layout – Anne Maclean
- Engineer – Geoff Allan
- Mastered By – Frank Arkwright
- Other [The Cover Star] – Fiona Morrison
- Strings – Cheryll Crockett, Elin Edwards, Greg Lawson, Lisa Webb, Lorna Leitch, Murray Ferguson
- Trumpet – Nigel Baillie
