= Oskar Bonde =

Swedish drummer

Oskar "Ossi" Bonde
- Birth name: Carl Oskar Torkelsson Bonde af Björnö
- Born: 24 January 1979 (age 46); Sweden
- Genres: Alternative rock
- Instrument: Drums
- Years active: 2004–present

Carl Oskar "Ossi" Torkelsson Bonde af Björnö (born 24 January 1979) is a Swedish drummer in the rock duo Johnossi.

Bonde grew up in Storängen, Nacka, Sweden, and lives currently in Stockholm. He has an older brother and sister.

Bonde got his first drum kit at age 12 after being fascinated by the drumming during a live band performance at a student party for his sister. Signed up for lessons by his mother, he found that practicing drum rudiments took the fun out of it, and after one lesson went back to learning on his own. He tried to model his playing after that of drummers he admired, particularly Nirvana's Dave Grohl and the Red Hot Chili Peppers' Chad Smith.

In 2012 he performed in Cologne, Germany with Björn Dixgård and Gustaf Norén (from Mando Diao), the Salazar Brothers, and singer Agnes Carlsson, under the umbrella of the Caligola musical project.
