= The Concretes =

Swedish indie pop band

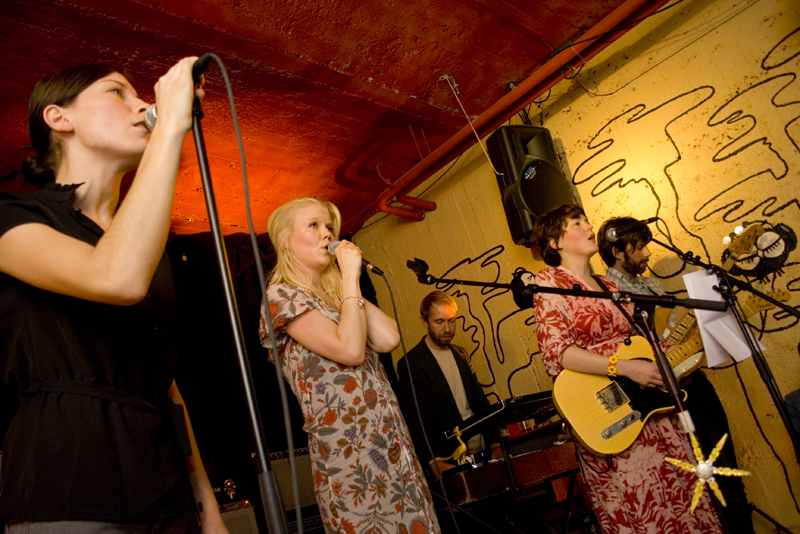
- The Concretes playing at Ugglan, 22 December 2006

Background information
- Origin: Sweden
- Genre: Indie pop
- Years active: 1995–present
- Labels: Licking Fingers; Astralwerks, Something In Construction
- Spinoffs: Taken by Trees
- Members: Maria Eriksson; Martin Hansson; Ulrik Karlsson; Lisa Milberg; Dante Kinnunen; Per Nyström; Ludvig Rylander; Daniel Värjö
- Past members: Victoria Bergsman

The Concretes were a Swedish indie pop band from Stockholm.

== History ==
Since their formation in 1995, the Concretes have grown into an eight-piece band. Original members of the band include Victoria Bergsman, Maria Eriksson, and Lisa Milberg. Band membership has expanded and they now have a number of "Honorary Concretes" who play on their records.

The song "You Can't Hurry Love," from their debut album, The Concretes, "Say Something New," has been featured on a number of television advertisements in the United States for Target and has been used in major motion pictures and other films. Their second album, In Colour, was released in 2006. It was followed shortly after by the departure of lead singer Victoria Bergsman, who has since moved on to her solo project, Taken By Trees. Lisa Milberg now provides lead vocals for the band, both on stage and on the band's third album Hey Trouble, released early 2007 and fourth album WYWH, released in 2010.

In 2007, the Concretes recorded a cover version of Take That's "Back for Good" for Engine Room Recordings' compilation album Guilt by Association, released September, 2007.

Maria Eriksson is also half of the band Heikki, with guitarist Jari Haapalainen. Heikki released its self-titled debut, a mini-CD, in Scandinavia in 2002. The follow-up, Heikki 2, appeared in 2004. Lisa Milberg, another original member of the Concretes, makes music as one half of the duo Miljon. Their first album "Don't They Know" came out on Swedish label Studio Barnhus in 2021.

== Group members ==
Current members:

- Maria Eriksson – guitar, lead and backup vocals
- Martin Hansson – bass, backup vocals
- Ulrik Janusson – horns, piano, backup vocals
- Lisa Milberg – drums, lead and backup vocals
- Dante Kinnunen - drums
- Per Nyström – organ, backup vocals
- Ludvig Rylander – horns, piano and backing vocals
- Daniel Värjö – guitar, mandolin, backup vocals

Former members:

- Victoria Bergsman – lead vocals

== Discography ==
=== Studio albums ===
- The Concretes, released 2003 in Sweden; 2004 internationally
- In Colour, released 13 March 2006 in the UK; 4 April 2006 in the US
- Hey Trouble, released 2007
- WYWH, released 2010

=== Compilations ===
- Boyoubetterunow, released 2000; comprising their first two EPs
- Layourbattleaxedown, released 26 July 2005; b-sides/rarities compilation

=== EPs ===
- Limited Edition (1999)
- Lipstick Edition (1999)
- Nationalgeographic (2001)

=== Singles ===
- "Forces" (2002)
- "You Can't Hurry Love" (2003)
- "Warm Night" (2003)
- "Say Something New" (2004)
- "Seems Fine" (2004)
- "Chico" (2004)
- "Lady December" (2004)
- "Chosen One" (2006)
- "On the Radio" (2006)
- "Kids" (2007)
- "Oh Boy" (2007)
- "Keep Yours" (2007)
