= John Engelbert =

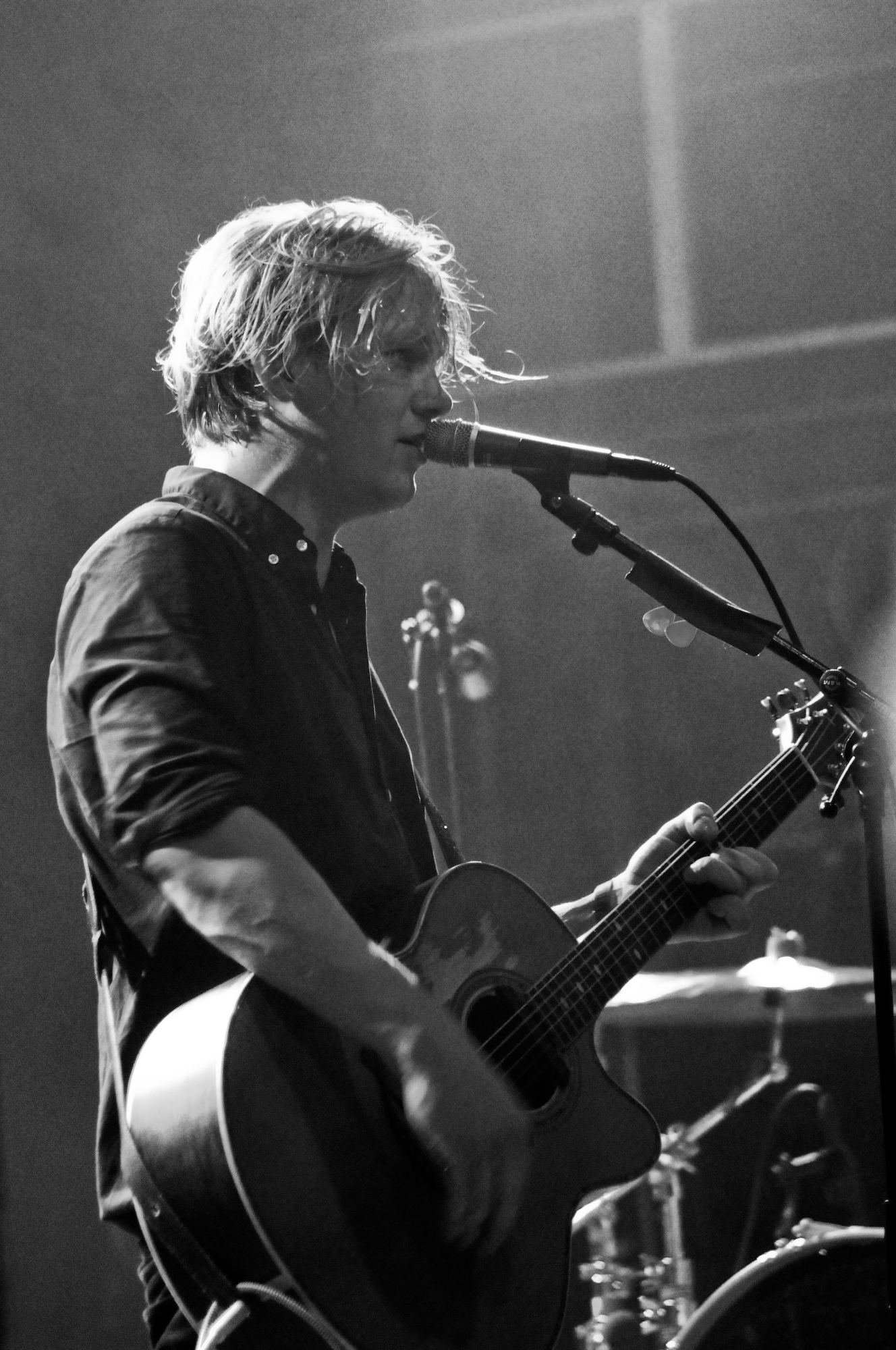
- John Engelbert in Johnossi 2008

Background information
- Born: John Henrik Lars Engelbert; 19 May 1982 (age 44); Sweden
- Genre: Alternative rock
- Years active: 2004–present
- Member of: Johnossi

John Henrik Lars Engelbert (born 19 May 1982) is a Swedish songwriter, singer and guitarist in the rock duo Johnossi. He was formerly a tour guitarist in Håkan Hellström's band.

Engelbert's guitar sound is based on running an acoustic guitar through effects pedals and electric guitar amplifiers.
