= Victoria Bergsman =

Swedish musician (born 1977)

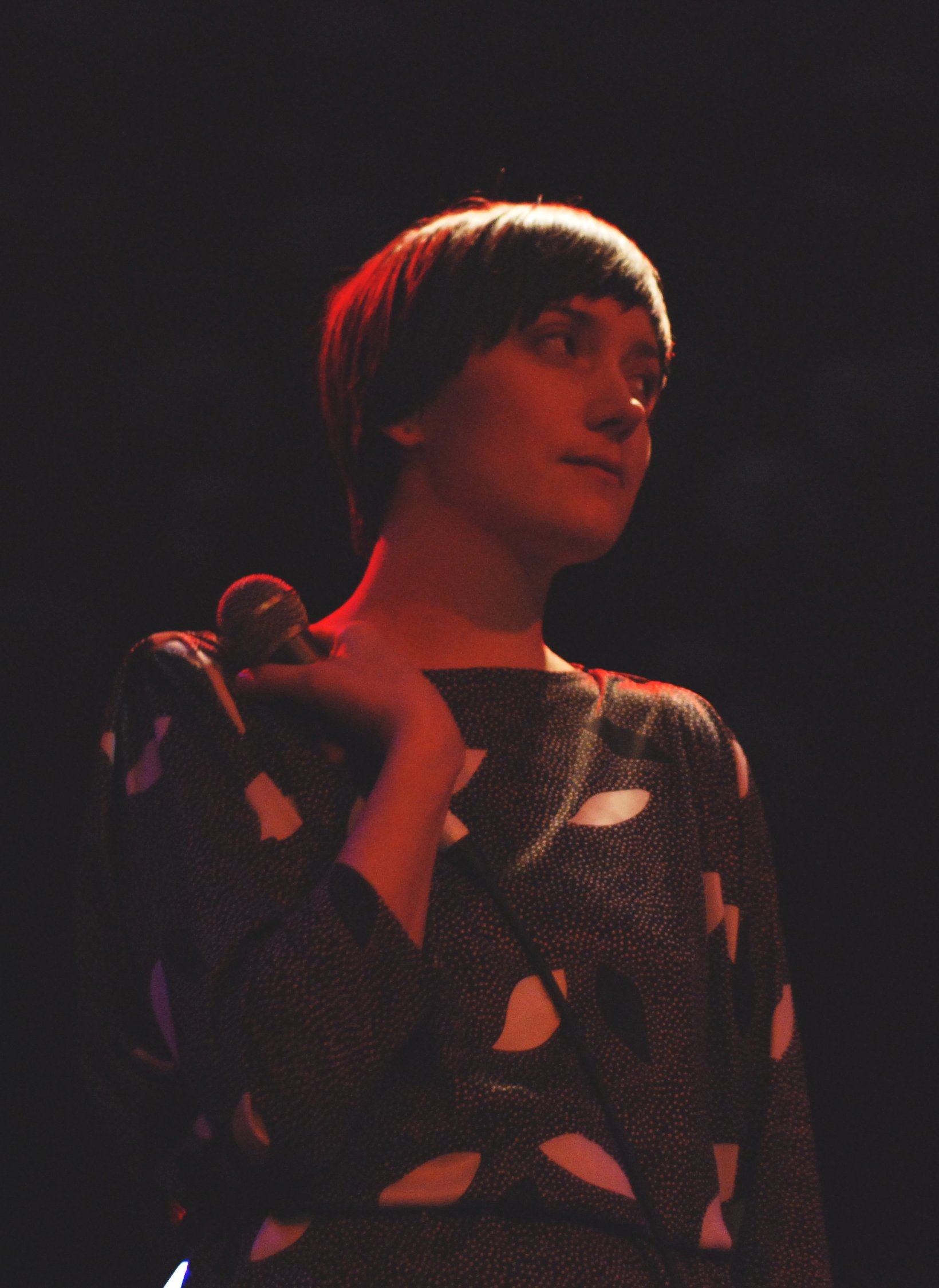
- Bergsman performing in New York in 2007

Background information
- Born: 4 May 1977 (age 49); Sweden
- Genres: Indie rock; indie pop
- Occupations: Vocalist; musician; songwriter
- Years active: 1995–present
- Labels: Licking Fingers; EMI; Rough Trade; Eleven; Secretly Canadian; ART:ERY; Shir
- Member of: Taken by Trees
- Formerly of: The Concretes

Victoria Bergsman (born 4 May 1977) is a Swedish singer-songwriter best known as singer of the indie pop band The Concretes from 1995 to 2006. Since announcing her departure from the band on 24 July 2006 she has been recording for her new solo project Taken by Trees. Bergsman also provided guest vocals for the hit Peter Bjorn and John single "Young Folks" from the album Writer's Block.

In 2009, her solo project Taken by Trees released East of Eden, a collaboration with Pakistani musicians. A version of the album was released in 2009 with a short documentary film about its recording, titled "Taweel Safari - The Longest Journey". The documentary was filmed in Pakistan by Bergsman, Andreas Söderström & Faseeh Shams and edited by Marcus Söderlund.

== Discogrphy ==
=== With the Concretes ===
- The Concretes (2004)
- In Colour (2006)

=== With Taken by Trees ===
- Open Field (2007)
- East of Eden (2009)
- Other Worlds (2012)
- Yellow to Blue (2018)
- Another Year (2022)

== Other works ==
In 2005 Bergsman acted in a music video for the pop song "Temptation", released by the English band New Order.
