= Lykke Li discography =

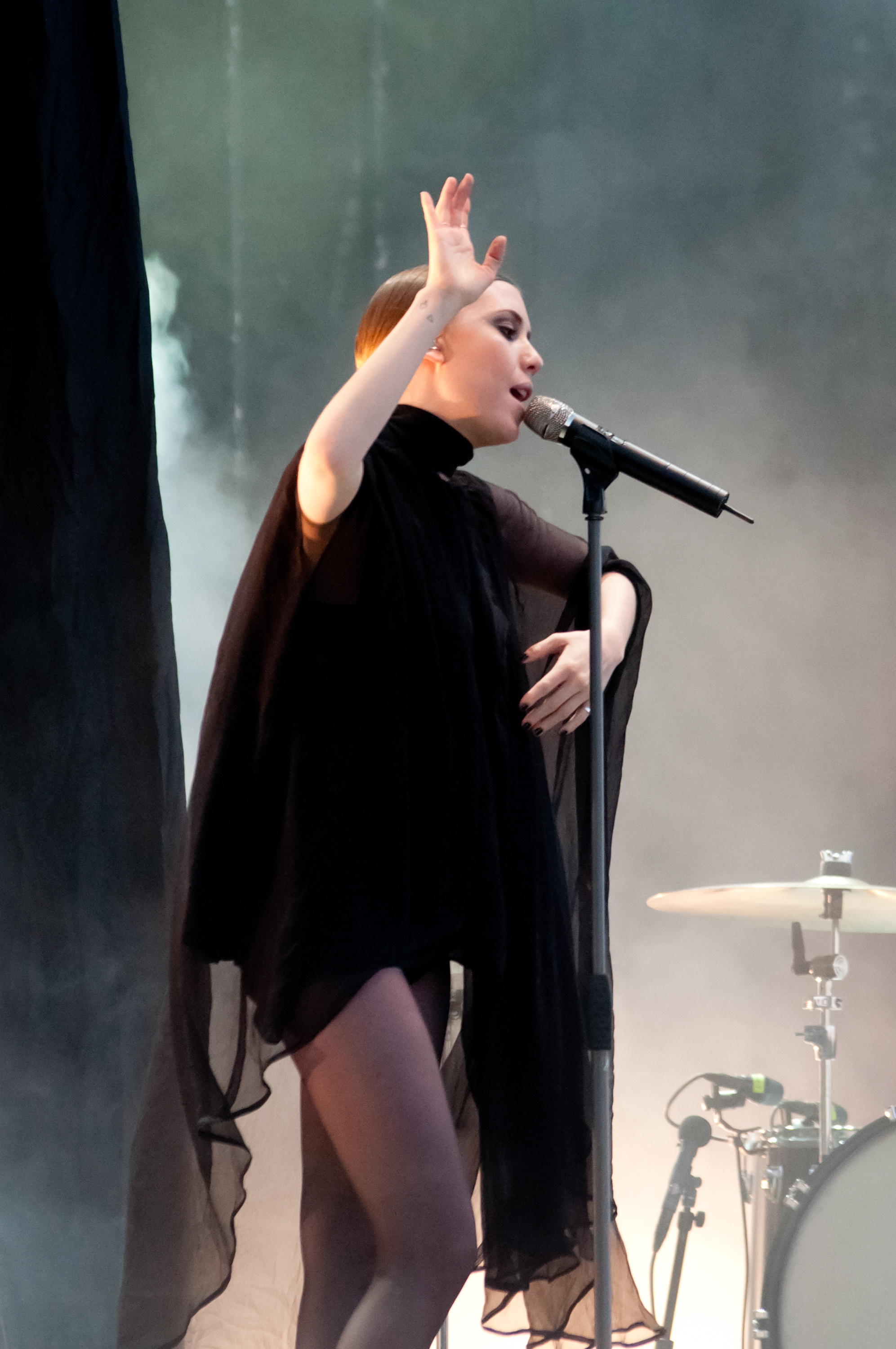
- Li performing at Peace & Love in Borlänge, Sweden, July 2011
- Studio albums: 6
- Extended plays: 4
- Singles: 25
- Music videos: 22

Lykke Li is a Swedish singer and songwriter. Her discography consists of six studio albums, four extended plays (EPs), twenty-five singles (including three as a featured artist), and twenty-two music videos. Eager to pursue a music career, Li began working with producer Björn Yttling of Swedish indie rock band Peter Bjorn and John when she was 19. The sessions resulted in her debut EP Little Bit, which she released on her own label LL Recordings in 2007. The release garnered attention from indie pop and mainstream publications in Sweden, while its title track peaked at number 20 on the Sverigetopplistan singles chart. Li soon released her debut studio album, Youth Novels (2008), which peaked at number three on the Swedish albums chart and spawned three more singles, including her second chart entry "I'm Good, I'm Gone". She then signed with Atlantic Records to distribute her releases worldwide. Youth Novels received widespread critical praise, but sales were poor.

Li appeared on American hip hop group N.A.S.A.'s single "Gifted" in 2009, and penned and recorded the song "Possibility" for the soundtrack of The Twilight Saga: New Moon later that year. Her second studio album Wounded Rhymes (2011) received similar critical success as Youth Novels, while adopting a darker sound. The album peaked at number two in Sweden and was certified gold by the Swedish Recording Industry Association (GLF). It also reached the top 20 on the album charts of Canada, Denmark, Finland, Ireland and Norway. Wounded Rhymes' second single, "I Follow Rivers", is Li's best performing single to date; it reached the top five on multiple charts and peaked at number one in Belgium (Flanders and Wallonia) and Germany, and earned certifications in Belgium, France, Germany and Switzerland. Li's third studio album I Never Learn (2014) showcased a more melancholic sound compared to her previous releases, and was named one of the best albums of 2014 by several American music publications.

== Studio albums ==
List of studio albums, with selected chart positions and certifications
Title	Album details	Peak chart positions										Sales	Certifications
Title	Album details	SWE	AUT	BEL (Fl)	FRA	GER	IRL	NLD	SWI	UK	US	Sales	Certifications
Youth Novels	Released: 30 January 2008; Label: LL; Formats: CD, digital download, vinyl	3	—	56	143	—	75	75	—	112	—	US: 106,000 (Note: US sales figures for Youth Novels as of April 2014.)	
Wounded Rhymes	Released: 25 February 2011; Label: LL, Atlantic; Formats: CD, digital download, vinyl	2	53	53	73	42	16	47	38	37	36	UK: 26,391 (Note: UK sales figures for Wounded Rhymes as of January 2012.); US: 97,000 (Note: US sales figures for Wounded Rhymes as of April 2014.)	GLF: Gold
I Never Learn	Released: 6 May 2014; Label: LL, Atlantic; Formats: CD, digital download, vinyl	2	50	54	60	43	17	60	25	33	29		
So Sad So Sexy	Released: 8 June 2018; Label: RCA; Formats: CD, digital download, vinyl	10	—	55	—	78	53	89	27	73	173		
Eyeye	Released: 20 May 2022; Label: PIAS; Formats: CD, digital download, vinyl	—	—	—	—	—	—	—	—	— (Note: Eyeye did not enter the UK Albums Chart but peaked at number 63 on the UK Album Downloads Chart.)	—		
The Afterparty	Released: 8 May 2026; Label: Neon Gold; Formats: CD, digital download	—	—	—	—	—	—	—	—	—	—		
"—" denotes a recording that did not chart or was not released in that territory.

== Extended plays ==
List of extended plays
Title	EP details
Little Bit	Released: 24 September 2007 (SWE); Label: LL; Formats: CD, digital download
iTunes Festival: London 2008	Released: 24 July 2008 (USA); Label: LL; Format: Digital download
iTunes Session	Released: 29 August 2011 (SWE); Label: LL; Format: Digital download
Still Sad Still Sexy	Released: 26 July 2019; Label: RCA; Format: Digital download
Covers	Released: 13 June 2025; Label: Play It Again Sam; Format: Digital download

== Singles ==
=== As lead artist ===
List of singles as lead artist, with selected chart positions and certifications, showing year released and album name
Title	Year	Peak chart positions										Certifications	Album
Title	Year	SWE	AUT	BEL (Fl)	DEN	FRA	GER	IRL	NLD	SWI	UK	Certifications	Album
"Little Bit"	2007	20	—	— (Note: "Little Bit" did not enter the Ultratop 50, but peaked at number 9 on the Flemish Ultratip chart.)	—	—	—	—	—	—	—	RIAA: Gold	Little Bit / Youth Novels
"I'm Good, I'm Gone"	2008	58	—	— (Note: "I'm Good, I'm Gone" did not enter the Ultratop 50, but peaked at number 13 on the Flemish Ultratip chart.)	—	—	—	—	—	—	152		Youth Novels
"Tonight"	2008	—	—	—	—	—	—	—	—	—	—		Youth Novels
"Breaking It Up"	2008	—	—	—	—	—	—	—	—	—	— (Note: "Breaking It Up" did not enter the UK Singles Chart, but peaked at number 48 on the UK Physical Singles Chart Top 100.)		Youth Novels
"Get Some"	2010	—	—	— (Note: "Get Some" did not enter the Ultratop 50, but peaked at number 23 on the Flemish Ultratip chart.)	—	—	—	—	—	—	— (Note: "Get Some" did not enter the UK Singles Chart, but peaked at number 78 on the UK Physical Singles Chart Top 100.)		Wounded Rhymes
"I Follow Rivers"	2011	44	2	1	40	4	1	2	2	2	— (Note: "I Follow Rivers" did not enter the UK Singles Chart, but peaked at number 30 on the UK Physical Singles Chart Top 100.)	BEA: 2× Platinum; BPI: Platinum; BVMI: 5× Gold; IFPI DNK: Gold; IFPI SWI: 3× Platinum; SNEP: Diamond; RIAA: Platinum	Wounded Rhymes
"Sadness Is a Blessing"	2011	—	—	—	—	—	—	—	—	—	—		Wounded Rhymes
"Youth Knows No Pain"	2011	—	—	—	—	—	—	—	—	—	—		Wounded Rhymes
"No Rest for the Wicked"	2014	—	—	— (Note: "No Rest for the Wicked" did not enter the Ultratop 50, but peaked at number 19 on the Flemish Ultratip chart.)	—	161	—	—	—	—	—		I Never Learn
"Gunshot"	2014	—	—	—	—	40	—	—	—	—	126		I Never Learn
"Never Gonna Love Again"	2015	—	—	—	—	—	—	—	—	—	—		I Never Learn
"Deep End"	2018	— (Note: "Deep End" did not enter the Swedish Singellista Chart, but peaked at number 14 on the Swedish Heatseeker Chart.)	—	—	—	—	—	—	—	— (Note: "Deep End" did not enter the Swiss Singles chart, but charted at number 83 on the Swiss Airplay chart.)	—		So Sad So Sexy
"Hard Rain"	2018	—	—	—	—	—	—	—	—	—	—		So Sad So Sexy
"Utopia"	2018	—	—	—	—	—	—	—	—	—	—		So Sad So Sexy
"Sex Money Feelings Die"	2018	—	—	—	—	—	—	—	—	—	—	BPI: Silver; RIAA: Platinum	So Sad So Sexy
"Two Nights" (featuring Aminé)	2018	—	—	—	—	—	—	—	—	—	—		So Sad So Sexy
"Sex Money Feelings Die" (Remix) (featuring Lil Baby and snowsa)	2019	—	—	—	—	—	—	—	—	—	—		Still Sad Still Sexy
"Two Nights Part II" (Remix) (with Skrillex and Ty Dolla Sign)	2019	—	—	—	—	—	—	—	—	—	—		Still Sad Still Sexy
"Bron"	2020	70	—	—	—	—	—	—	—	—	—		Non-album single
"No Hotel"	2022	—	—	—	—	—	—	—	—	—	—		Eyeye
"Highway to Your Heart"	2022	—	—	—	—	—	—	—	—	—	—		Eyeye
"Happy Hurts"	2022	—	—	—	—	—	—	—	—	—	—		Eyeye
"Lucky Again"	2026	—	—	—	—	—	— (Note: "Lucky Again" did not reach the Top 100 Single-Charts, but peaked at number 66 at the German airplay chart.)	—	—	—	—		The Afterparty
"Knife in the Heart"	2026	—	—	—	—	—	—	—	—	—	—		The Afterparty
"Sick of Love"	2026	—	—	—	—	—	—	—	—	—	—		The Afterparty
"Happy Now"	2026	—	—	—	—	—	—	—	—	—	—		The Afterparty
"Happiness Is So Sad" (with Swedish House Mafia)	2026	3	—	44	—	—	—	—	—	—	—		Non-album single
"—" denotes a recording that did not chart or was not released in that territory.

=== As featured artist ===
List of singles as featured artist, with selected chart positions, showing year released and album name
Title	Year	Peak chart positions						Certifications	Album
Title	Year	SWE	BEL (Fl)	FRA	IRL	NLD	UK	Certifications	Album
"Gifted" (N.A.S.A. featuring Kanye West, Santigold & Lykke Li)	2009	—	—	—	—	—	—		The Spirit of Apollo
"I'm Waiting Here" (David Lynch featuring Lykke Li)	2013	—	—	—	—	—	—		The Big Dream
"Late Night Feelings" (Mark Ronson featuring Lykke Li)	2019	— (Note: "Late Night Feelings" did not enter the Swedish Singellista Chart, but peaked at number 11 on the Swedish Heatseeker Chart.)	— (Note: "Late Night Feelings" did not enter the Ultratop 50, but peaked at number five on the Flemish Ultratip chart.)	54	40	— (Note: "Late Night Feelings" did not enter the Netherlands' Single Top 100 but peaked on the Netherlands' Single Tip Chart at number 30.)	30	ARIA: Gold; BPI: Platinum	Late Night Feelings
"—" denotes a recording that did not chart or was not released in that territory.

== Other charted songs ==
List of songs, with selected chart positions, showing year released and album name
Title	Year	Peak chart positions					Certifications	Album
Title	Year	SWE	BEL (FL)	FRA	UK	US Bub.	Certifications	Album
"Possibility"	2009	59	—	166	133	20	RIAA: Gold	The Twilight Saga: New Moon (Original Motion Picture Soundtrack)
"Unchained Melody"	2017	—	—	137	—	—		Non-album singles
"Time in a Bottle"	2018	— (Note: "Time in a Bottle" did not enter the Swedish Singellista Chart, but peaked at number 13 on the Swedish Heatseekers Chart.)	— (Note: "Time in a Bottle" did not enter the Ultratop 50, but peaked at number 41 on the Flemish Ultratip chart.)	—	—	—		Non-album singles
"—" denotes a recording that did not chart or was not released in that territory.

== Guest appearances ==
List of guest appearances, with other performing artists, showing year released and album name
Title	Year	Other performer(s)	Album
"Until We Bleed"	2008	Kleerup	Kleerup
"Knocked Up" (Lykke Li vs. Rodeo Remix)	2008	Kings of Leon	"Use Somebody" — Single
"Little Bit"	2009	Drake	So Far Gone
"Gifted"	2009	N.A.S.A., Kanye West, Santigold	The Spirit of Apollo
"Miss It So Much"	2009	Röyksopp	Junior
"Were You Ever Wanted"	2009	Röyksopp	Junior
"Leaving You Behind"	2009	Amanda Blank	I Love You
"Possibility"	2009	—N/a	The Twilight Saga: New Moon – Original Motion Picture Soundtrack
"A New Name to Go By"	2012	Deportees	Islands & Shores
"Black Tin Box"	2012	Miike Snow	Happy to You
"Come Near"	2012	—N/a	Ingrid Volym 1
"Silver Springs"	2012	—N/a	Just Tell Me That You Want Me
"I'm Waiting Here"	2013	David Lynch	The Big Dream
"Du är den ende"	2014	—N/a	"Du är den ende (Music from the Motion Picture "Tommy")" — Single
"No One Ever Loved"	2014	—N/a	The Fault In Our Stars (Music from the Motion Picture)
"The Troubles"	2014	U2	Songs of Innocence
"No Rest for the Wicked" (Robin Schulz Edit)	2014	Robin Schulz	Prayer
"Come Find Me"	2015	Emile Haynie, Romy Madley Croft (from the xx)	We Fall
"Never Let You Down"	2015	Woodkid	The Divergent Series: Insurgent – Original Motion Picture Soundtrack
"Wicked Game"	2016	—N/a	The Music of David Lynch
"Late Night Prelude"	2019	Mark Ronson	Late Night Feelings
"2 AM"	2019	Mark Ronson	Late Night Feelings

== Songwriting credits ==
List of songs written or co-written for other artists, showing year released and album name
Title	Year	Artist(s)	Album
"Million Pieces"	2010	Tove Styrke	Tove Styrke
"Let Me Go"	2012	Brandy	Two Eleven
"Spinning"	2019	Mark Ronson, Ilsey	Late Night Feelings

== Music videos ==
List of music videos, showing year released and director
Title	Year	Director(s)
"Little Bit"	2008	Mattias Montero
"I'm Good, I'm Gone"	2008	Mattias Montero
"Breaking It Up"	2008	Sarah Chatfield
"Tonight"	2009	Christian Haag
"Possibility"	2010	Marcus Palmqvist and Frode Fjerdingstad
"Get Some"	2010	Johan Söderberg
"I Follow Rivers"	2011	Tarik Saleh
"Sadness Is a Blessing"	2011	Tarik Saleh
"I Never Learn"	2014	Tarik Saleh
"Love Me Like I'm Not Made of Stone"	2014	Tarik Saleh
"No Rest for the Wicked"	2014	Tarik Saleh
"Gunshot"	2014	Fleur & Manu
"Never Gonna Love Again"	2015	Philippe Tempelman
"Utopia"	2018	Clara Cullen
"Deep End"	2018	Anton Tammi
"Hard Rain"	2018	Anton Tammi
"Highway To Your Heart"	2022	Theo Lindquist
"Happy Hurts"	2022	Theo Lindquist
"Over"	2022	Theo Lindquist
"Carousel"	2022	Theo Lindquist
"5D"	2022	Theo Lindquist
"ü&i"	2022	Theo Lindquist
