= Lykke Li videography =

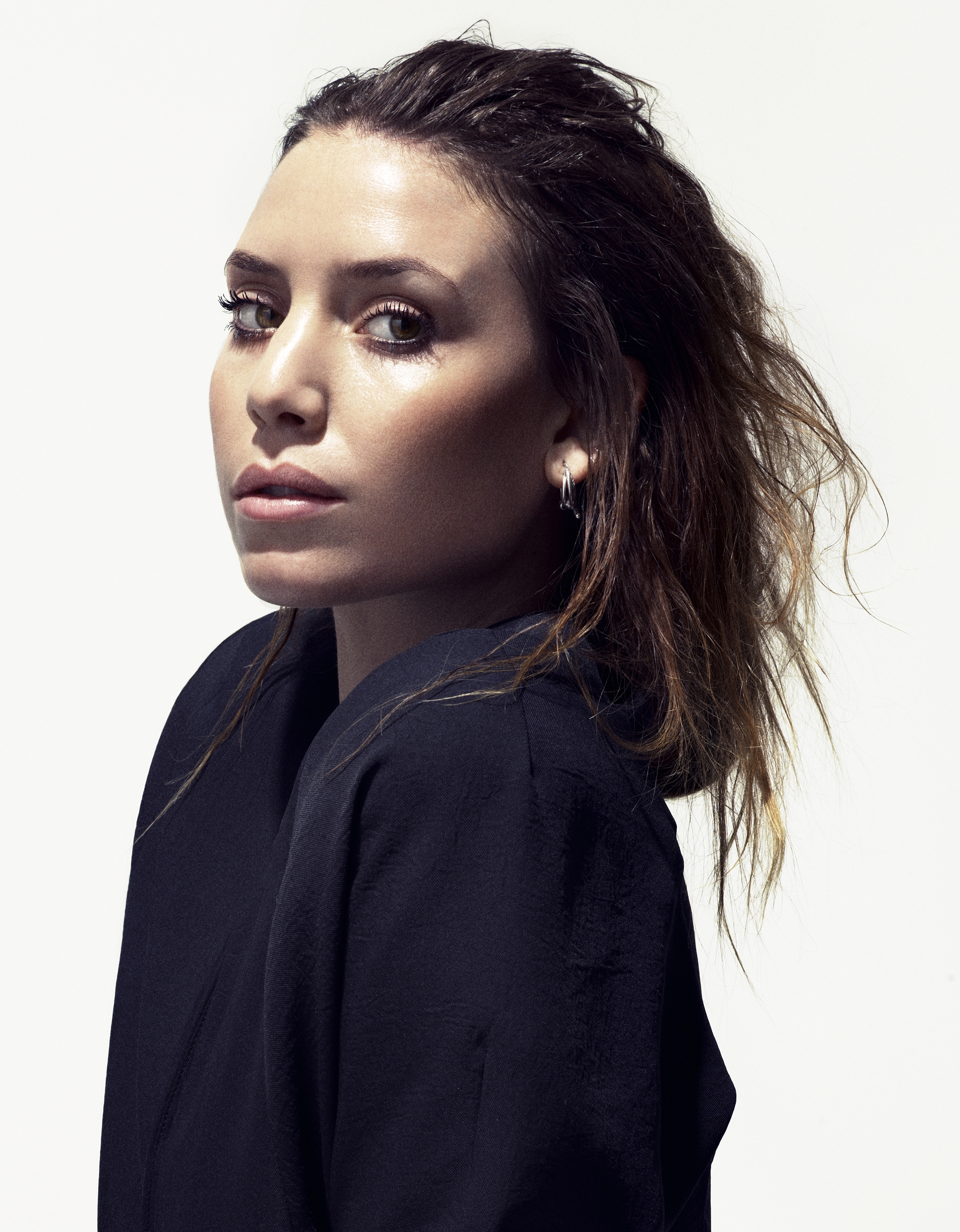
Li in 2010

Lykke Li is a Swedish singer, songwriter, actress and model. She has appeared in music videos, films and commercials. Li made her acting debut in the 2014 Swedish crime film Tommy, directed by longtime collaborator Tarik Saleh. In 2017, Li starred in Terrence Malick's Song to Song where she played one of Ryan Gosling's love interests. Her song "Gunshot" was used in the television commercial for the Peugeot 108, which stars Li. She also starred in a short film for Gucci's Spring/Summer 2015 collection, which featured her song "Just Like a Dream".

== Music videos ==
Key
†	Denotes music videos that have not yet been released

=== As main artist ===
Year	Title	Director(s)	Album	Ref.
2008	"Little Bit"	Mattias Montero	Youth Novels	
2008	"I'm Good, I'm Gone"	Mattias Montero	Youth Novels	
2008	"Breaking It Up"	Sarah Chatfield	Youth Novels	
2009	"Tonight"	Christian Haag	Youth Novels	
2010	"Possibility"	Marcus Palmqvist and Frode Fjerdingstad	The Twilight Saga: New Moon	
2010	"Get Some"	Johan Söderberg	Wounded Rhymes	
2011	"I Follow Rivers"	Tarik Saleh	Wounded Rhymes	
2011	"Sadness Is a Blessing"	Tarik Saleh	Wounded Rhymes	
2014	"Love Me Like I'm Not Made of Stone"	Tarik Saleh	I Never Learn	
2014	"No Rest for the Wicked"	Tarik Saleh	I Never Learn	
2014	"Gunshot"	Fleur & Manu	I Never Learn	
2015	"Never Gonna Love Again"	Philippe Tempelman	I Never Learn	
2018	"Utopia"	Clara Cullen	So Sad So Sexy	
2018	"Deep End"	Anton Tammi	So Sad So Sexy	
2018	"Hard Rain"	Anton Tammi	So Sad So Sexy	
2022	"Highway To Your Heart"	Theo Lindquist	Eyeye	
2022	"Happy Hurts"	Theo Lindquist	Eyeye	
2022	"Over"	Theo Lindquist	Eyeye	
2022	"Carousel"	Theo Lindquist	Eyeye	
2022	"5D"	Theo Lindquist	Eyeye	
2022	"ü&i"	Theo Lindquist	Eyeye	

=== As featured artist ===
Year	Title	Other performer(s)	Director(s)	Album	Ref.
2009	"Gifted"	N.A.S.A. Kanye West; Santigold	Three Legged Legs	The Spirit of Apollo	
2013	"I'm Waiting Here"	David Lynch	Daniel Desure	The Big Dream	
2016	"Wings of Love" (as part of Liv)	Andrew Wyatt; Pontus Winnberg; Björn Yttling; Jeff Bhasker	Herself	—N/a	
2019	"Late Night Feelings"	Mark Ronson	JP Chartrand	Late Night Feelings	

== Commercials ==
Year	Promoting	Description	Notes	Ref.
2014	Peugeot 108	Promotes Peugeot latest vehicle	Features the song "Gunshot"	
2015	Lykke Li & the Lady Web	Promotes Gucci Spring/Summer 2015 collection	Features the song "Just Like a Dream"	

== Filmography ==
=== Feature films ===
Year	Title	Role	Director(s)	Notes	Ref.
2014	Tommy	Blanca	Tarik Saleh	Film debut (as Lykke Li Zachrisson)	
2017	Song to Song	Lykke	Terrence Malick		

=== Short films ===
Year	Title	Role	Dirorector(s)	Notes	Ref.
2008	Balladen om Marie Nord och hennes klienter	—N/a	Alexander Onofri	Voice role	
2010	Solarium	Herself	Moses Berkson		
2011	Untitled	Herself	—N/a	Album trailer for Wounded Rhymes	
2011	"I Follow Rivers"	Herself	Tarik Saleh	Part of the Live on the Moon series	
2011	"I Know Places"	Herself	Tarik Saleh	Part of the Live on the Moon series	
2011	"Sadness Is a Blessing"	Herself	Tarik Saleh	Part of the Live on the Moon series	
2014	"I Never Learn"	Herself	Tarik Saleh	Album trailer for I Never Learn	
2018	"So Sad So Sexy"	Herself	—N/a	Album trailer for So Sad So Sexy	
2020	"Eyeye"	Herself	Theo Lindquist	Album trailer for Eyeye	

=== Television ===
Year	Title	Role	Notes	Ref.
2008–2011	Later... with Jools Holland	Herself (performer)	2 episodes	
2011	Late Night with Jimmy Fallon	Herself (performer)	Performed "Get Some"	
2011	Conan	Herself (performer)	Performed "Get Some"	
2011	The Tonight Show with Jay Leno	Herself (performer)	Performed "Youth Knows No Pain"	
2011	Late Show with David Letterman	Herself (performer)	Performed "Silent My Song" ("Jerry Seinfeld/Lykke Li")	
2019	The Jonathan Ross Show	Herself (performer)	Performed "Late Night Feelings" with Mark Ronson	
2019	The Late Show with Stephen Colbert	Herself (performer)	Performed "Late Night Feelings" with Mark Ronson	

=== Web ===
Year	Title	Role	Director(s)	Notes	Ref.
2018	WeTransfer Presents Work In Progress	Herself	Kaj Jefferies, Alice Lewis	Documentary series ("Episode 3: Lykke Li")	
