= Walter Robot =

Walter Robot is a creative studio founded by artist Bill Barminski and director Christopher Louie. They work in multiple mediums including film, television, art and sculpture. Their film work has screened at several film festivals, including the Sundance Film Festival and the Los Angeles Film Festival where in 2012 the festival hosted a retrospective of their work. Their artwork has been showcased in several installations and galleries in Los Angeles, New York and London. In 2014, to much critical success, they worked with the world-renowned Cleveland Orchestra and staged the first ever interactive animated version of The Cunning Little Vixen opera.

== History ==
Walter Robot began as a robot they built to star in a music video for the Modest Mouse's "Missed the Boat" green screen competition. Walter Robot won the competition and went on to direct music videos for several notable artists including Kid Cudi, Gnarls Barkley, Vitalic, Rob Thomas of Matchbox 20 and Death Cab for Cutie. In addition to their music videos they have worked with commercial clients ranging from Nokia, Play-Doh, MTV, Wendy's, Lexus and American Express.

Their video "Grapevine Fires" for Death Cab for Cutie was accepted into the 2009 Los Angeles Film Festival where it won Audience Award for Best Music Video. Shortly after the success of the "Grapevine Fires" video they teamed again with Death Cab for Cutie for their song "Meet Me on the Equinox" which was the premiere single for The Twilight Saga: New Moon (soundtrack). In 2012 they also directed the video for Death Cab for Cutie's "Underneath the Sycamore" (which included a clip of the "Grapevine Fires" video within this video).

A retrospective of their work was hosted by the 2012 Los Angeles Film Festival in two screenings titled, THUNDERDOME (Walter Robot vs. The Daniels).

As well as their music videos they have completed several successful viral videos and short films. A short film they did in collaboration with Los Angeles Times journalist Joel Stein was accepted to screen at the 2009 Sundance Film Festival. They also worked with Academy Award-nominated and Emmy Award winner, director Jeffrey Blitz, on the documentary Lucky, which premiered at the 2010 Sundance Film Festival.

For feature films and TV they are represented at William Morris Endeavor for whom they directed and produced a short film titled, The Transfer.

They are currently developing several feature film, television and artistic properties. One of which includes Mojowski 77; a surreal neo-noir set in an alternate Los Angeles filled with robots and cardboard guns. The cardboard guns have been displayed as artwork in several art gallery shows that opened in 2011. And a video they directed/animated for Death Cab for Cutie's "Underneath the Sycamore" previews the animated TV show version of Mojowski 77, and also features a clip from their earlier video for "Grapevine Fires".

In September 2012 they collaborated on an art show titled This Side Up. The show was hosted by the Robert Berman Gallery at Bergamot Station in Santa Monica, California. The art show featured video installation, cardboard sculpture as well as paintings and drawings.

== Videography ==
- "Missed the Boat" - Modest Mouse (2007)
- "U and I" - Vitalic (2007)
- "The City" - Milosh (2007)
- "Desperate Times, Desperate Measures" - Underoath (2008)
- "Practice Makes Perfect" - Cute Is What We Aim For (2008)
- "Mystery Man" - Gnarls Barkley (2008)
- "Grapevine Fires" - Death Cab for Cutie (2009)
- "Give Me the Meltdown" - Rob Thomas (2009)
- "Meet Me on the Equinox" - Death Cab for Cutie (2009)
- "Nervous Breakdown" - Hawthorne Heights (2010)
- "Slippin" - Quadron (2010)
- "Balloons" - Them Jeans (2011)
- "Underneath the Sycamore" - Death Cab for Cutie (2012)
- "Teleport 2 Me, Jamie" - WZRD (2012)
- "Apple" - Barnaby Saints (2013)
- "Good Help (Is So Hard to Find)" - Death Cab for Cutie (2016)
