= The Afterparty (Lykke Li album) =

2026 studio album by Lykke Li

Studio album by Lykke Li
- Released: 8 May 2026
- Length: 24:46
- Label: Neon Gold
- Producer: Zach Fogarty; Lykke Li; Rick Nowels; Jacob Olofsson; Psymun; David Andrew Sitek; Björn Yttling

Lykke Li chronology
Eyeye (2022)	The Afterparty (2026)

Singles from The Afterparty
- 1. "Lucky Again" Released: 13 February 2026; 2. "Knife in the Heart" Released: 13 March 2026; 3. "Sick of Love" Released: 8 April 2026; 4. "Happy Now" Released: 5 May 2026

The Afterparty is the sixth and reportedly final studio album by the Swedish singer Lykke Li, released through Neon Gold Records on 8 May 2026.

== Background and recording ==
Lykke Li began work on The Afterparty following the release of her 2022 album Eyeye and a 2025 covers EP. The new record was written primarily in Los Angeles, where Li entered what she described in promotional materials as her "existential era", focusing on themes of the lower self, including revenge, shame and despair. Recording for The Afterparty took place in Stockholm, Sweden, and features arrangements performed with a 17-piece orchestra. Li incorporated unconventional elements into the sessions, including what she described as "apocalyptic bongos", to give the album a dramatic and orchestral sound that contrasted with her previous work. Li stated that she was influenced by britrock and was "trying to be a male, dick-swinging rockstar" on the album. Li has framed the album as a stylistic departure rooted in emotional intensity and introspection. In press statements, she expressed that the record deals with darker aspects of the human psyche, rather than the pursuit of a "higher self." The first single from the album, "Lucky Again", which samples composer Max Richter and blends orchestral and electronic elements, was released ahead of the album in February 2026.

== Critical reception ==
Professional ratings
Aggregate scores
Source	Rating
AnyDecentMusic?	7.1/10
Metacritic	75/100
Review scores
Source	Rating
DIY	4/5 stars
The Line of Best Fit	6/10
Mojo	4/5 stars
MusicOMH	4/5 stars
NME	4/5 stars
Pitchfork	7.0/10
The Skinny	5/5 stars

The Afterparty received positive reviews from critics upon release. On the review aggregator website Metacritic, the album received a weighted average score of 75 from 100 based on nine reviews, indicating "generally favorable" reviews. The review aggregator site AnyDecentMusic? compiled six reviews and gave the album an average of 7.1 out of 10, based on their assessment of the critical consensus.

The Skinny's Rick Fulton gave the album perfect five out of five stars rating and wrote, "Lykke Li describes The Afterparty as "an album dealing with your lower self: your need for revenge, your shame, despair" but the angst is done on the dancefloor." NME's Andrew Trendell gave four out of five stars and wrote, "with strings, beats and love, Lykke Li slammed down a heady shot to call time. Here’s hoping she’s got at least another round left in her."

Matt Young of The Line of Best Fit wrote, "The Afterparty is messy, amusing at times and intentionally touching on uncomfortable moods, that honesty is appreciated, and the songs themselves feel fine, if underwhelming when they’re describing such potentially big emotions."

== Track listing ==
The Afterparty track listing
No.	Title	Writer(s)	Producer(s)	Length
1.	"Not Gon Cry"	Lykke Li; Matthew Castellanos; Jacob Olofsson; Björn Yttling	Li; Olofsson; Yttling	2:55
2.	"Happy Now"	Li; Castellanos; Yttling	Li; Yttling	2:42
3.	"Lucky Again"	Li; Olofsson; Justin Parker; Max Richter; Yttling	Li; Yttling; Olofsson^{[c]}	3:01
4.	"Famous Last Words"	Li; Ilsey Juber; Olofsson	Li; Olofsson; Yttling	2:46
5.	"Future Fear"	Li; Simon Christensen; Zach Fogarty; Olofsson	Li; Olofsson; Fogarty; Psymun	1:23
6.	"So Happy I Could Die"	Li; Juber; Rick Nowels	Li; Nowels; David Andrew Sitek^{[c]}	2:48
7.	"Sick of Love"	Li; Parker	Li; Sitek	3:36
8.	"Knife in the Heart"	Li; Rick Nowels	Li; Nowels; Sitek; Yttling^{[c]}	2:57
9.	"Euphoria"	Li; Olofsson; Parker; Yttling	Li; Yttling	2:38
Total length:				24:46

=== Note ===
- ^{^[c]} indicates a co-producer

== Personnel ==
Credits are adapted from Tidal.

=== Musicians ===
- Lykke Li – lead vocals
- Björn Yttling – percussion (tracks 1–4), piano (1–3, 9), Hammond organ (1–3), drum programming (1, 2, 4), synthesizer (1), orchestration (2–4, 9); bass, electric guitar (2, 3); Wurlitzer (2), acoustic guitar (9)
- Lars Skoglund – percussion (1–4), drums (1–3), bass drum (4)
- Amanda Bergman – background vocals (1–3)
- Mapei – background vocals (1–3)
- Gustaf Ejstes – flute (1, 2, 9)
- Jacob Olofsson – synthesizer (1, 3), piano (1, 4), drum programming (4)
- Erik Arvinder – orchestration, strings conductor (2–4, 9)
- Stockholm Studio Orchestra – string ensemble (2–4, 9)
- Andreas Forsman – violin (2–4, 9)
- Anna Roos Stefansson – violin (2–4, 9)
- Daniela Bonfiglioli – violin (2–4, 9)
- Fredrik Syberg – violin (2–4, 9)
- Christoper Öhman – viola (2–4, 9)
- Erik Holm – viola (2–4, 9)
- Daniel Thorell – cello (2–4, 9)
- Jonna Simonsson – violin (2–4)
- Oscar Treitler – violin (2–4)
- Vicky Sayles – violin (2–4)
- Filip Lundberg – cello (2–4)
- Riikka Repo – viola (2–4)
- Lola Torrente – violin (2, 3, 9)
- Daniel Migdal – violin (2, 9)
- Kristina Winiarski – cello (2, 9)
- Dan Berglund – double bass (4, 9)
- Zach Fogarty – guitar (5)
- Psymun – programming, synthesizer (5)
- Rick Nowels – acoustic guitar, Wurlitzer (6); Farfisa, Hammond organ, piano (8)
- Zac Rae – bass, EBow guitar, keyboards (6, 8); drum programming, Hammond organ, violin (6); bongos, effects, toy piano (8)
- John Christopher Fee – drum programming, percussion (6, 8); drums, effects (6); drum machine, handclaps (8)
- David Andrew Sitek – drums, programming, synthesizer (7)
- Anouk Crystal – background vocals (8)
- Dion Bhasker – background vocals (8)
- Gia Billie – background vocals (8)
- Suzy Shinn – background vocals (8)
- Austin Corona – electric guitar (8)

=== Technical ===
- Gustav Lindelöw – engineering, mixing (1–4, 9)
- Björn Yttling – engineering (1–4, 9)
- Hans Stenlund – engineering (1–4, 9)
- Jonas Lindström – engineering (1–4, 9)
- Karl Wingate – engineering (1–4, 9)
- Jacob Olofsson – engineering (3, 4)
- Psymun – engineering (5)
- John Christopher Fee – engineering (6, 8)
- Alex Partri – engineering (7, 8)
- David Andrew Sitek – engineering (7)
- Dean Reid – engineering (8)
- Dom Tenaglia – engineering (8)
- Colby Keyz – engineering assistance (6, 8)
- Elizaveta Boldyreva – engineering assistance (7, 8)
- Geoff Swan – mixing (5, 6, 8)
- Matty Green – mixing (7)
- Matt Cahill – mixing assistance (5, 6, 8)
- Henke Jonsson – mastering

== Charts ==
Chart performance for The Afterparty
Chart (2026)	Peak position
French Physical Albums (SNEP)	106
French Rock & Metal Albums (SNEP)	13
Swedish Physical Albums (Sverigetopplistan)	8
Scottish Albums (OCC)	41
UK Albums Sales (OCC)	45
UK Independent Albums (OCC)	17

== Release history ==
Release dates and formats
Region	Date	Format(s)	Label	Ref.
Various	8 May 2026	CD; LP; digital download; streaming	Neon Gold	
