= Eyeye =

Studio album by Lykke Li
- Released: 20 May 2022
- Recorded: 2020–2021
- Studio: Lykke Li's home studio (Los Angeles, California)
- Genre: Lo-fi; art pop; bedroom pop
- Length: 33:33
- Label: PIAS
- Producer: Lykke Li; Björn Yttling; Rodaidh McDonald; Carter Lang

Lykke Li chronology
So Sad So Sexy (2018)	Eyeye (2022)	The Afterparty (2026)

Singles from Eyeye
- 1. "No Hotel" Released: 23 March 2022; 2. "Highway to Your Heart" Released: 20 April 2022

Eyeye (pronounced "Eye") is the fifth studio album by Swedish singer Lykke Li, and her first since So Sad So Sexy (2018). Released on 20 May 2022, the album reunites Li with her longtime collaborator Björn Yttling, producer of her first three albums. It was preceded by the release of the singles "No Hotel" and "Highway to Your Heart".

Described as "an immersive audiovisual album", Theo Lindquist directed the visual component of the record, starring Li opposite Jeff Wilbusch. The seven minute-long visual loops were shot by cinematographer Eduard Grau on 16-millimeter film.

== Background and recording ==
In a July 2019 interview with NME, Li stated: "I think, maybe to everyone's disappointment, I'm going to really scale it down and back and slow it down. [...] It'll be more like soul music. It'll still be sad, and still be sexy." In a March 2022 interview for Vogue, Li described the making of the album as "cathartic", with it "charting the emotional fallout from the end of a relationship" and approaching "love and heartbreak on a more conceptual level".

The album was entirely recorded in Li's bedroom in Los Angeles. The vocals were recorded on a handheld $70 drum mic, with the album mixed to tape by Shawn Everett.

== Release and promotion ==
"No Hotel" was released as the first single from the record on 23 March 2022. The album was announced a day later, alongside a trailer featuring a snippet of "Carousel". On 20 April, Li released the single "Highway to Your Heart".

Li embarked on an international tour in support of the album, which started on 26 September 2022 in San Diego.

== Critical reception ==
Professional ratings
Aggregate scores
Source	Rating
Metacritic	76/100
Review scores
Source	Rating
DIY	3.5/5 stars
The Irish Times	4/5 stars
The Line of Best Fit	7/10
musicOMH	3.5/5 stars
NME	4/5 stars
Pitchfork	7.4/10
The Telegraph	4/5 stars
The Skinny	3/5 stars
Slant	3.5/5 stars

At Metacritic, which assigns a normalised rating out of 100 to reviews from mainstream publications, the album received an average score of 76 based on 11 reviews, indicating "generally favorable reviews".

== Track listing ==
Eyeye track listing
No.	Title	Writer(s)	Producer(s)	Length
1.	"No Hotel"	Li Zachrisson; Björn Yttling	Lykke Li; Yttling	2:26
2.	"You Don't Go Away"	Zachrisson; Yttling	Li; Yttling	3:13
3.	"Highway to Your Heart"	Zachrisson; Yttling	Li; Yttling	3:59
4.	"Happy Hurts"	Zachrisson; Sarah Aarons; Eli Weisfield; Rodaidh McDonald; Carter Lang	Li; Yttling; McDonald; Lang	4:56
5.	"Carousel"	Zachrisson; Yttling	Li; Yttling	4:14
6.	"5D"	Zachrisson; Aarons; Weisfield; McDonald; Lang	Li; Yttling; McDonald; Lang	3:45
7.	"Over"	Zachrisson; Yttling	Li; Yttling	3:44
8.	"Ü&I"	Zachrisson; Yttling	Li; Yttling	7:16
Total length:				33:33

== Personnel ==
Credits are adapted from the album's liner notes.

- Lykke Li – executive production
- Shawn Everett – mixing
- Patricia Sullivan – mastering
- Lars Skoglund – additional instrumentation
- Carter Lang – additional instrumentation
- Eli Rise – additional instrumentation
- Hans Stenlund – engineering
- Theo Lindquist – creative direction, photography, video artwork
- Zane Kalnina – photography production, video artwork production
- Edu Grau – "Highway to Your Heart" cinematography
- Shane Ainsworth – "Carousel" cinematography
- Brian Roettinger – graphic design

== Charts ==
Chart performance for Eyeye
Chart (2022)	Peak position
UK Album Downloads (OCC)	63
UK Independent Albums (OCC)	44
