= Meet Me on the Equinox =

Single by Death Cab for Cutie

from the album The Twilight Saga: New Moon – Original Motion Picture Soundtrack
- Released: September 13, 2009
- Recorded: 2009
- Genre: Indie rock; alternative rock
- Length: 3:44
- Label: Chop Shop; Atlantic
- Songwriter(s): Ben Gibbard
- Producer(s): Chris Walla

Death Cab for Cutie singles chronology
"Little Bribes" (2009)	"Meet Me on the Equinox" (2009)	"You Are a Tourist" (2011)

"Meet Me on the Equinox" is a song by American indie rock band Death Cab for Cutie that was released as the first single from the soundtrack to the 2009 film The Twilight Saga: New Moon. The song debuted on September 13 during the 2009 MTV Video Music Awards. The music video, directed by the Walter Robot team, premiered in October.

== Background and lyrics ==
Alexandra Patsavas, music supervisor on New Moon, provided scenes from the film to some of the artists featured on the soundtrack as a guide. Death Cab for Cutie guitarist Chris Walla said he had read two of the books in the Twilight series at the time of the song's recording and noted that the lyrics are more suggestive than literal.

Singer Ben Gibbard admitted that he hadn't read all of the books in the Twilight series and said that the song is more about his personal life than Stephenie Meyer's fictional world. Gibbard said of the song's meaning, "The song at its core is just about meeting another halfway, because life is very short, because there's only a brief period of time to really connect with people, and that it's important to recognize that." Gibbard added, "I just wanted something that kind of tonally matched the story and the scenes within the film, so they could kind of be put alongside but not be telling a narrative you're watching on the screen."

== Reception ==
Evan C. Jones of Billboard praised the song's guitars and melodies and said its lyrics "convey an eerie sensuality appropriate for a teen-vampire love story." Peter Gason of Spin described the song as Death Cab for Cutie's "most unabashed stab at pop crossover yet."

== Chart performance ==
In September 2009, the song entered the US Billboard Alternative Songs chart, where it has peaked at number eight. The song has peaked at number 30 in Australia, number 34 in New Zealand, and number 86 on the UK Singles Chart. It is the band's highest-charting song in Australia, New Zealand, Belgium, and Spain.

== Charts ==
=== Weekly charts ===
Chart (2009)	Peak position
Australia (ARIA)	30
Belgium (Ultratip Bubbling Under Flanders)	8
Belgium (Ultratip Bubbling Under Wallonia)	13
Canada Rock (Billboard)	43
Czech Republic (Modern Rock)	6
Germany (GfK)	71
Japan (Japan Hot 100)	73
New Zealand (Recorded Music NZ)	34
Scotland (OCC)	85
Spain (PROMUSICAE)	15
UK Singles (OCC)	86
US Bubbling Under Hot 100 Singles (Billboard)	2
US Hot Rock & Alternative Songs (Billboard)	17

=== Year-end charts ===
Chart (2010)	Position
US Alternative Songs (Billboard)	48
