= Little Bit =

- Swedish single release cover

Single by Lykke Li

from the album Youth Novels
- B-side: "Everybody but Me"; "Time Flies"; "After Laughter"; "Dance, Dance, Dance"
- Released: 24 September 2007
- Genre: Indie pop; dance
- Length: 4:33
- Label: LL
- Composers: Lykke Li; Björn Yttling
- Lyricist: Lykke Li
- Producers: Björn Yttling; Lasse Mårtén (co.)

Lykke Li singles chronology
"Little Bit" (2007)	"I'm Good, I'm Gone" (2008)

Music video
- "Little Bit" on YouTube

"Little Bit" is a song by Swedish singer Lykke Li from her debut studio album, Youth Novels (2008). Produced by Björn Yttling and co-produced by Lasse Mårtén, the track was released on 24 September 2007 as the album's lead single. It was included on the soundtrack to the HBO series Bored to Death, while a snippet of the song was used in the commercial for Victoria's Secret Ipex bra starring Heidi Klum. Also, rapper Charles Hamilton sampled the song on his track Starchasers from his mixtape It's Charles Hamilton. Canadian rapper Drake remixed the song for his 2009 mixtape So Far Gone.

== Critical reception ==
"Little Bit" received positive reviews from many music critics. In a review for Blogcritics, Tan The Man wrote that the song is "mesmerizing, evoking a sensual striptease fantasy by a former love" and that it "fuses so many sounds, from quasi-bossa nova to soul, while maintaining a simplistic and raw, non-explicitly erotic beat in the background." Matthew Perpetua from Spin rated the track seven out of ten, stating it is "built upon the clack and clang of acoustic percussion and little else, aside from occasional bits of guitar or saxophone", addind that it sounds "exceptionally intimate, to the point where it's easy to feel voyeuristic when listening on the title cut to her unguarded declaration of love." Q magazine noticed "a breathless intensity to [the] lyrics that takes the song beyond the realm of throwaway pop. 'I would do it, push the button, pull the trigger, jump off a cliff...' she sings, clearly not just 'a little bit' in love as she tries to convince herself, but rather in the grip of an overwhelming infatuation." Jon Lusk of BBC Music called it "metronomic, infectiously hummable" and viewed it as "a great new example of the emotional conflict which 10cc and Smokey Robinson lyrically documented so well." Adrien Begrand of PopMatters felt that the song's "approach is far more subtle than most contemporary pop singles would ever dare to be, its gentle, slightly distorted bass synth propelled by the faintest traces of percussion, both electronic and acoustic, Yttling providing mandolin accents during the choruses. But it's Lykke Li who commands our attention, delivering as perfect a hook in the chorus that rivals Robyn's best work, but not before making us fall off our chairs with a second verse that tosses aside all nuance in favor of direct, unadulterated lust." Rolling Stone's Will Hermes opined that "[a] quietly intoxicating electropulse drives the reluctant lover's confession in 'Little Bit' while Li memorably rhymes 'legs apart' with 'tainted heart.'"

== Track listings ==
- Swedish digital EP
1. "Little Bit" – 4:34
2. "Everybody but Me" – 3:17
3. "Time Flies" – 3:15
- Swedish limited-edition 10-inch single

A1. "Little Bit" – 4:34
B1. "Everybody but Me" – 3:17
B2. "Time Flies" – 3:15

- US EP
1. "Little Bit" – 4:41
2. "Dance, Dance, Dance" – 3:43
3. "Everybody but Me" – 3:18
4. "Time Flies" – 3:22
- UK digital EP
1. "Little Bit" – 4:35
2. "Little Bit" (Loving Hand Remix) – 9:26
3. "Little Bit" (CSS Remix) – 4:40
4. "After Laughter" – 3:40
- UK limited-edition 7-inch single

A. "Little Bit" – 4:34
B. "Dance, Dance, Dance" – 3:42

- UK 12-inch single

A1. "Little Bit" (Loving Hand Remix) – 9:26
B1. "Little Bit" (CSS Remix) – 4:40
B2. "Little Bit" (Staygold's Skansen Remix)

== Credits and personnel ==
Credits adapted from the liner notes of Youth Novels.

- Lykke Li – vocals
- Björn Yttling – production, recording, mixing, keyboards, percussion, mandolin
- Lasse Mårtén – co-production, recording, additional recordings, mixing
- Janne Hansson – recording
- Matt Azzarto – additional recordings
- Bill Emmons – additional recordings
- Tommy Andersson – engineering assistance
- Tom Gloady – engineering assistance
- Neil Lipuma – engineering assistance
- Henrik Jonsson – mastering
- John Eriksson – cymbal

== Charts ==
Chart performance for "Little Bit"
Chart (2008)	Peak position
Belgium (Ultratip Bubbling Under Flanders)	9
Sweden (Sverigetopplistan)	20

== Certifications ==
Certifications for "Little Bit"
Region	Certification	Certified units/sales
United States (RIAA)	Gold	500,000^{‡}
^{‡} Sales+streaming figures based on certification alone.

== Release history ==
Region	Date	Format	Label	Ref.
Sweden	24 September 2007	Digital download	LL Recordings	
Sweden	2007	10-inch single	LL Recordings	
United Kingdom	25 February 2008	7-inch single	Moshi Moshi	
United States	6 May 2008	EP	The Control Group	
United Kingdom	24 October 2008	Digital download	Atlantic	
United Kingdom	27 October 2008	12-inch single	Atlantic	
