= I'm Good, I'm Gone =

Single by Lykke Li

from the album Youth Novels
- B-side: "I Don't Mind (Jump on It)"
- Released: 14 January 2008
- Genre: Pop
- Length: 3:09
- Label: LL
- Composer(s): Lykke Li; Björn Yttling
- Lyricist(s): Lykke Li; Björn Yttling
- Producer(s): Björn Yttling; Lasse Mårtén (co.)

Lykke Li singles chronology
"Little Bit" (2007)	"I'm Good, I'm Gone" (2008)	"Breaking It Up" (2008)

Music video
- "I'm Good, I'm Gone" on YouTube

"I'm Good, I'm Gone" is a song by Swedish singer Lykke Li from her debut studio album, Youth Novels (2008). Produced by Björn Yttling and co-produced by Lasse Mårtén, it was released on 14 January 2008 as the album's second single. It was featured in the video game FIFA 09, while the Black Kids remix of the song was included on the soundtrack to the 2009 horror film Sorority Row. Rolling Stone listed it at number 34 on its list of the 100 Best Singles of 2008.

== Track listings ==
- Swedish and UK CD single / Swedish digital single
1. "I'm Good, I'm Gone" – 3:10
2. "I Don't Mind (Jump on It)" – 4:13
- Swedish limited-edition 7-inch single

A. "I'm Good, I'm Gone" – 3:11
B. "I Don't Mind (Jump on It)" – 4:13

- UK digital single
1. "I'm Good, I'm Gone" – 3:09
2. "I'm Good, I'm Gone" (Metronomy Remix) – 5:15
3. "I'm Good, I'm Gone" (Black Kids Remix) – 3:23
- UK 7-inch single

A. "I'm Good, I'm Gone" – 3:03
B. "I'm Good, I'm Gone" (Metronomy Remix) – 5:05

- UK 12-inch single

A1. "I'm Good, I'm Gone" (Metronomy Remix) – 5:15
A2. "I'm Good, I'm Gone" (Black Kids Remix) – 3:23
B1. "I'm Good, I'm Gone" (Five Guys & A Dog Remix)

- Danish promotional CD single
1. "I'm Good, I'm Gone" (Fred Falke Vocal) – 7:31
2. "I'm Good, I'm Gone" (Fred Falke Instrumental) – 7:32
3. "I'm Good, I'm Gone" (Black Kids Remix) – 3:25
4. "I'm Good, I'm Gone" (Metronomy Vocal) – 5:21
5. "I'm Good, I'm Gone" (Metronomy Instrumental) – 5:18

== Credits and personnel ==
Credits adapted from the liner notes of Youth Novels.

- Lykke Li – vocals
- Björn Yttling – production, recording, mixing, electric bass, piano, percussion, synthesizers, acoustic guitar, celeste
- Lasse Mårtén – co-production, recording, additional recordings, mixing
- Janne Hansson – recording
- Matt Azzarto – additional recordings
- Bill Emmons – additional recordings
- Tommy Andersson – engineering assistance
- Tom Gloady – engineering assistance
- Neil Lipuma – engineering assistance
- Henrik Jonsson – mastering
- Lars Skoglund – drums, percussion
- John Eriksson – percussion
- Mapei – backing vocals
- Lissy Trullie – backing vocals

== Charts ==
Chart (2008)	Peak position
Belgium (Ultratip Bubbling Under Flanders)	13
Sweden (Sverigetopplistan)	58
UK Singles (Official Charts Company)	152

== Release history ==
Region	Date	Format	Label	Ref.
Sweden	14 January 2008	Digital download	LL Recordings	
Sweden	16 January 2008	CD single	LL Recordings	
Sweden	15 February 2008	7-inch single	LL Recordings	
United Kingdom	23 May 2008	Digital download	Atlantic	
United Kingdom	26 May 2008	12-inch single	Atlantic	
United Kingdom	2 June 2008	CD single; 7-inch single	Atlantic	
