= Possibility (song) =

Song for The Twilight Saga: New Moon

Promotional single by Lykke Li

from the album The Twilight Saga: New Moon
- B-side: "Possibility (Slowed Down)"
- Released: 2 December 2022
- Recorded: 2009
- Studio: Decibel Studios (Stockholm, Sweden)
- Genre: Chamber pop
- Length: 5:06
- Label: Chop Shop; Atlantic; LL
- Songwriter: Lykke Li
- Producer: Lykke Li

Music video
- "Possibility" on YouTube

"Possibility" is a song recorded by Swedish recording artist Lykke Li for the soundtrack to the 2009 film The Twilight Saga: New Moon. Li had been asked to write a song for the film soundtrack, but she was initially reluctant to commit to the project. After seeing an early film screening, she decided she wanted to contribute to the soundtrack.

Following the soundtrack's release on 16 October 2009, "Possibility" charted at number 59 on the Swedish Singles Chart for the week of 4 December 2009, based on download sales from the album. The song was also featured in the season one finale of the ABC sitcom Suburgatory, originally aired on 16 May 2012. On 2 December 2022, "Possibility" was released as a promotional single through LL Recordings.

== Background and writing ==
Li commented on the song in an October 2009 interview with MTV News, saying, "Everyone kept asking me if I wanted to do it, how [the song] was going, when would I have it finished, and I was like, 'Eh, I don't know, maybe I'll do it, maybe I won't.' I mean, I had heard of the Twilight phenomenon, but I didn't read the books or watch the first movie or anything. I mean, I'm Swedish." She also added, "I stayed [in Los Angeles] and watched the movie, when it only had green screen on it. I had this hook in my mind, even before I saw the movie, and then I was watching it, and I was like, 'That's the hook!' So it was very much like a discovery, inside myself and musically. I had this song growing inside of me that I had to get out, and [the film] was the trigger. Because I really connected with Bella and Edward's tortured love story."

The following year, in December 2010, Li told The Guardian: "I was sitting in a car in England [when I got the call] eating a sandwich from Tesco, and I had no idea what Twilight was. Somebody explained it as this thing about vampires and I'm like, 'I hate vampires.' But when I thought about it, there are so few pop culture things today, where people are really crazy about something, like Beatlemania, so I thought, how cool to be part of something that so many young, open hearts listen to."

== Critical reception ==
"Possibility" was well received by music critics. Todd Martens wrote for the Los Angeles Times that Li "could melt the coldest of hearts with this sparse tearjerker. A slight scratch in her vocals cuts through the song's intimately innocent feel. 'Tell me when you hear my heart stop,' she sings, while a backing choir inflects the sparse piano with gospel undertones—a brief, largely a cappella prayer." Dose magazine referred to the song as "one of the more gripping mope-outs on the disc. The Swedish pop-singer coos in a cracked-with-emotion whisper, accompanied by a barely-there piano, as she pines for a lover." Consequence of Sound critic Anthony Balderrama noted that Li "channels some of the more intimate moments of her short career on 'Possibility'. It evokes the vulnerability she's so good at cooing, just as she did in the simple 'Time Flies' and 'Tonight' off of [her album] Youth Novels. At five minutes, the locomotive rhythm and clunky piano borders on plodding, but the overall effect is so depressing that it works better than it should."

IndieLondon rated the song four out of five, stating it is "as beautiful and haunting as we've come to expect from this Swedish performer... and perfectly ethereal to accompany staring out the window at a snowy landscape. If it wasn't essential beforehand, it damn sure is now!" Marc Hogan of Pitchfork commented that the "feedback-streaked piano ballad 'Possibility' is a relative bright spot, but like the rest of the tracks [on the soundtrack], it pales in comparison to the work on her own records." Krista Richmond of KillerFilm called the song "lovely in its haunted, enchanting way" and added that it is "soft and melodic enough to pull at even the toughest of heartstrings". MusicRadar's Joe Bosso opined that "[t]his stark, piano-based hymn is spiritual stuff, and Li's arresting vocal powers will have you on your knees in worship." Adam Pfleider of AbsolutePunk expressed that "Lykke Li is where the problem of the soundtrack lies. I can't listen to this music without thinking of where it will end up in the melodrama of some teenager metamorphosing into a CGI werewolf. 'Possibility' is a beautiful song, but I can't help feeling its placement in the film would kill its blossoming melody in the end."

In December 2009, the song was announced as one of the sixty-three songs to be shortlisted for the Best Original Song category at the 82nd Academy Awards, but did not make it to the final list.

== Music video ==
The music video for "Possibility" consists of Li's live performance of the song at Stockholm's Decibel Studios on 9 March 2010, and was directed by Marcus Palmqvist and Frode Fjerdingstad. The singer posted the video on her official website on 18 March 2010—coinciding with her twenty-fourth birthday—, saying:

Here you go, Internet. The first live performance EVER of this song. An homage to an idea lost in the fire. Fortunately for us all, two camera men happened to be lurking in the shadows while me and my band got our groove on for the first time since we recorded it. Why the wait one might think? Well, me as well as other things had to dwell and change shapes for a while but now... Winter became spring. There is hope again!

=== Reception ===
Mikela Floyd of Filter described the video as "the perfect visual representation of her ballad". Tyler Grisham of Pitchfork wrote it is "about as somber as the tune itself".

== Track listing ==
Digital download and streaming

1. "Possibility" – 5:06
2. "Possibility (Slowed Down)" – 6:23

== Personnel ==
Credits adapted from the liner notes of The Twilight Saga: New Moon – Original Motion Picture Soundtrack.

- Lykke Li – vocals, production
- Lasse Mårtén – engineering, mixing

== Charts ==
Chart performance for "Possibility"
Chart (2009–2012)	Peak position
France (SNEP)	166
Sweden (Sverigetopplistan)	59
UK Singles (OCC)	133
US Bubbling Under Hot 100 (Billboard)	20
US Heatseeker Songs (Billboard)	19
US Rock Digital Song Sales (Billboard)	39

== Certifications ==
Certifications for "Possibility"
Region	Certification	Certified units/sales
United States (RIAA)	Gold	500,000^{‡}
^{‡} Sales+streaming figures based on certification alone.
