= I Never Learn =

Studio album by Lykke Li
- Released: 2 May 2014
- Recorded: 2013
- Studio: Ingrid, Stockholm; Spegeln, Stockholm; Music & Words, Stockholm; Decibel, Stockholm; Echo, Los Angeles; Sonora Recorders, Los Angeles; The Green Building, Santa Monica, California
- Genre: Indie pop; dream pop
- Length: 32:50
- Label: LL; Atlantic
- Producer: Greg Kurstin; Lykke Li; Björn Yttling

Lykke Li chronology
| Wounded Rhymes (2011) | I Never Learn (2014) | So Sad So Sexy (2018) |

Singles from I Never Learn
- 1. "No Rest for the Wicked" Released: 20 March 2014; 2. "Gunshot" Released: 1 August 2014; 3. "Never Gonna Love Again" Released: 8 April 2015

I Never Learn is the third studio album by Swedish singer Lykke Li, released on 2 May 2014 by LL Recordings and Atlantic Records. The album was produced by Li, Björn Yttling and Greg Kurstin. It spawned the singles "No Rest for the Wicked", "Gunshot" and "Never Gonna Love Again".

== Background and recording ==
In an interview with NME in January 2014, Li announced plans to release her third studio album in May. According to Li, the album is the final installment in a trilogy chronicling "a woman in her twenties and her search for love and herself", which began with her first two albums, Youth Novels (2008) and Wounded Rhymes (2011). After experiencing "the biggest breakup of her life", Li moved from Sweden to Los Angeles, where she spent two and a half years writing I Never Learn. "I made no such plans to make an album. My first instinct was just to try to heal myself and to come back to some sort of life. And then I was so emotionally broken that I just started to write... I love writing, and it was so amazing to get lost in the process. I didn't think that someone would ever hear it", she told Billboard.

During much of her time in California, Li listened to Van Morrison's 1968 album Astral Weeks, Harry Nilsson demos, The Band and Dennis Wilson. Greg Kurstin produced two tracks on I Never Learn, while Li and longtime collaborator Björn Yttling helmed the rest of the album, marking her first album as co-producer. She described I Never Learn as a collection of "power ballads for the broken", adding that the album is "about me and the guilt and the shame and the hurt and the pride and the confusion of being a woman." Li also felt that her third album would establish her place in the music industry, stating: "I always feel like I've been slightly misunderstood. As a woman you get judged for appearances or things like that I don't really care about. If anything I want to be seen as a singer-songwriter rather than a pop artist. I really feel like I've found my voice."

== Release and promotion ==
The album's title and release date were officially announced on 27 February 2014, along with a Tarik Saleh-directed teaser video containing the title track, which features actor Fares Fares and was filmed in Los Angeles in February 2014. Li stated that the title reflects how she felt "so lost as an artist, as a woman", and that it "just came to me. I want to be lost. And then those words were there—'I don't know and I never fucking learn.'" On 4 March 2014, Li released a video for the song "Love Me Like I'm Not Made of Stone", also directed by Saleh.

On 27 April 2014, I Never Learn was made available to stream in full on the NPR for a limited time. To promote the album, Li embarked on an 11-date tour across Europe and the US, which began in Stockholm on 24 April 2014 and ended in Los Angeles on 19 May. After performing at several European and North American music festivals from 14 June to 10 August, Li performed 14 US dates throughout autumn, beginning in Seattle on 17 September and concluding in Miami on 12 October. She also returned to Europe in November 2014, performing two shows in Germany and three in the United Kingdom. Li stars in a short film for Gucci's Spring/Summer 2015 collection, which features the song "Just Like a Dream" and debuted on 2 March 2015.

On 14 November 2024, Li released the song 'Midnight Shining' as part of the 10th anniversary of I Never Learn.

== Singles ==
"No Rest for the Wicked" was released on 20 March 2014 as the album's lead single, while a remix of the song featuring ASAP Rocky was released digitally on 21 April. The video for "No Rest for the Wicked", directed by Saleh, premiered on 10 April 2014. The album's second single, "Gunshot", was released digitally on 1 August 2014, and was later serviced to US alternative radio on 16 September 2014. The video for "Gunshot", directed by Fleur & Manu, was filmed in Paris and debuted on 15 July 2014. The song is also used in the television commercial for the Peugeot 108, which stars Li. On 6 April 2015, Li released a music video for "Never Gonna Love Again", which was directed by Philippe Tempelman. The track was released on 8 April as the album's third and final single.

== Critical reception ==
Professional ratings
Aggregate scores
| Source | Rating |
|---|---|
| AnyDecentMusic? | 7.2/10 |
| Metacritic | 77/100 |
Review scores
| Source | Rating |
| AllMusic | 4/5 stars |
| The Guardian | 3/5 stars |
| The Independent | 2/5 stars |
| The Irish Times | 4/5 stars |
| Los Angeles Times | 3.5/4 stars |
| Mojo | 4/5 stars |
| NME | 6/10 |
| Pitchfork | 8.4/10 |
| Rolling Stone | 3.5/5 stars |
| Spin | 6/10 |

I Never Learn received generally positive reviews from music critics. At Metacritic, which assigns a normalised rating out of 100 to reviews from mainstream publications, the album received an average score of 77, based on 32 reviews. Pitchfork's Ian Cohen referred to I Never Learn as Li's "most ambitious and shortest album" and stated, "We're used to breakup albums that assume you just want to crawl into a hole and die, but I Never Learn is for the times when heartbreak is so life-affirming that you want to share the feeling with the world." John Murphy of musicOMH praised the songwriting as "wonderful" and characterised the production as "a typically Scandinavian brand of delicious melancholy with an added injection of wistful hopefulness", while dubbing the album "a heart-wrenching, utterly compelling listen". Timothy Monger of AllMusic noted that Li "manages a tunefulness that aspires to great pop heights, yet retains the wintry austerity of her Nordic roots. On ... I Never Learn, she manages to meld both of those assets into a beautifully crafted set of lonesome break-up ballads." Simon Harper of Clash described the album as "tender and compelling" and wrote, "Though her personal tragedy has been transformed into an affecting record of real beauty, one truly hopes Li's next chapter isn't quite so agonising." Randall Roberts of the Los Angeles Times wrote that the album "suggests an artist just hitting her stride".

Rolling Stone's Sophie Weiner opined that the album's "[Phil] Spector-ish arrangements, thick with multitracked vocals and densely layered instruments, don't always add as much as they should: The simplest songs here are the most affecting", while commenting, "If Lykke Li keeps refining her voice, she'll soon rank as an A-list pop heart-crusher." Slant Magazine's Kevin Liedel stated, "Though she's largely eschewing Youth Novels's bubbly synth-pop and Wounded Rhymes's slick power ballads for simpler arrangements and derelict instrumentation, Li still manages to make the ramshackle music of I Never Learn sound grand and, perhaps more impressively, inject a kind of dark romanticism into her depictions of crippling separation." Arnold Pan of PopMatters viewed it as "a more mature album in theme and sound when compared to the playfulness and whimsy that made Youth Novels and ... Wounded Rhymes stand out." Pan also wrote, "Despite the finality of what's supposed to be the third installment of a three-part series, I Never Learn promises more in the future as Lykke Li keeps moving along her own singular path, personally and artistically." Michael Hann of The Guardian felt that the album "works best in the smallest doses, despite its brevity, because it's as one-paced as a fading lower-division central defender, and that pace is sluggish", adding that the tracks are "often lovely on their own, but a little tiresome across a whole album." Katherine St. Asaph of Spin expressed that although songs like "No Rest for the Wicked", "Gunshot" and "Love Me Like I'm Not Made of Stone" are "worthwhile cuts", the rest of the album "is like the exhaustion after a sob session, too indistinct to even be indulgent", concluding, "As a rendition of post-breakup inertia, it's accurate enough. As an album—pop or otherwise—it's baffling." Greg Cochrane of NME was mixed in his assessment of the album's consistently "intimate, introverted and tremendously sad" mood, calling it "an album about love, but not a record to love". Despite calling the title track "a gorgeous opener", The Independent's Andy Gill found that the album "needs greater variety, some sort of joy against which to measure the pain."

=== Accolades ===
| Publication | Accolade | Rank | Ref. |
|---|---|---|---|
| Billboard | The 10 Best Albums of 2014 | 7 | |
| Complex | The 50 Best Albums of 2014 | 36 | |
| Consequence of Sound | Top 50 Albums of 2014 | 15 | |
| Cosmopolitan | The 20 Best Albums of 2014 | 9 | |
| Drowned in Sound | 50 Favourite Albums of 2014 | 23 | |
| Gigwise | 50 Albums of 2014 | 14 | |
| Paste | The 50 Best Albums of 2014 | 24 | |
| Pitchfork | The 50 Best Albums of 2014 | 23 | |
| PopMatters | The 80 Best Albums of 2014 | 37 | |
| Rolling Stone | 20 Best Pop Albums of 2014 | 7 | |
| Under the Radar | Top 140 Albums of 2014 | 19 | |
| Vulture | The 32 Best Pop Albums of 2014 | 29 | |

== Commercial performance ==
I Never Learn debuted at number 24 on the Swedish Albums Chart, jumping to number 14 the following week. In its third week on the chart, the album peaked at number two, becoming Li's second album to reach that peak position in her native Sweden, after Wounded Rhymes in 2011. The album entered the UK Albums Chart at number 119 on the basis of two days sales, climbing to number 33 the following week with 2,774 copies sold and earning Li her highest-peaking album in the United Kingdom to date. In the United States, I Never Learn debuted at number 29 on the Billboard 200, making it Li's highest-peaking album on the chart.

== Track listing ==
All lyrics are written by Lykke Li; all music is composed by Li and Björn Yttling, except where noted.

| No. | Title | Music | Producer(s) | Length |
|---|---|---|---|---|
| 1. | "I Never Learn" | | Li; Yttling | 3:04 |
| 2. | "No Rest for the Wicked" | | Li; Yttling | 3:42 |
| 3. | "Just Like a Dream" | | Li; Yttling | 4:08 |
| 4. | "Silver Line" | Li; Rick Nowels; Yttling; Greg Kurstin | Li; Yttling | 3:52 |
| 5. | "Gunshot" | Li; Nowels; Yttling | Li; Kurstin | 3:24 |
| 6. | "Love Me Like I'm Not Made of Stone" | Li; Nowels; Yttling | Li; Yttling | 3:47 |
| 7. | "Never Gonna Love Again" | | Li; Yttling | 4:00 |
| 8. | "Heart of Steel" | Li; Nowels; Yttling | Li; Yttling | 3:54 |
| 9. | "Sleeping Alone" | | Li; Yttling; Kurstin | 2:59 |
| Total length: | | | | 32:50 |

iTunes Store deluxe edition bonus tracks
| No. | Title | Length |
|---|---|---|
| 10. | "Gunshot" (acoustic) | 3:36 |
| 11. | "I Never Learn" (video) | 2:34 |
| 12. | "Love Me Like I'm Not Made of Stone" (video) | 3:51 |
| 13. | "No Rest for the Wicked" (video) | 3:37 |
| Total length: | | 46:28 |

== Personnel ==
Credits adapted from the liner notes of I Never Learn.

=== Musicians ===
- Lykke Li – vocals, harmonies
- Bjorn Yttling – acoustic guitar, Taurus, zither, piano, electric bass, Mellotron, sitar, percussion
- Greg Kurstin – drums, keyboards, piano, Orchestron, guitar, bass, organ, Mellotron, percussion, electric guitar
- Rick Nowels – acoustic guitar
- Lars Skoglund – drums, percussion
- Lasse Mårtén – percussion, drum programming
- Anders Pettersson – steel guitar, electric guitar
- Amanda Hollingby Matsson – additional vocals
- Andreas Forsman – violin
- Calle Olsson – synthesizer
- Cecilia Linné – cello
- Christopher Öhman – viola
- Conny Lindgren – violin
- Erik Arvinder – violin
- Erik Holm – viola
- John Eriksson – percussion
- Ketil Solberg – violin
- Leo Svensson – cello
- Mariam Wallentin – vocals
- Thomas Tjärnkvist – electric guitar
- Vincent Brantley – choir (track 7)
- Sean Dancy – choir (track 7)
- Yolanda Dancy – choir (track 7)
- Katherine Dancy – choir (track 7)
- Talitha Manor – choir (track 7)
- Brandon Hampton – choir (track 7)
- Andrea Thomas – choir (track 7)

=== Technical ===
- Lykke Li – production
- Bjorn Yttling – production (tracks 1–4, 6–9); recording
- Greg Kurstin – production (tracks 5, 9); recording
- Lasse Mårtén – vocal production, mixing, recording
- Hans Stenlund – recording
- Gustav Lindelöw – recording
- Viktor Bälter-Lundin – recording
- Nille Perned – recording
- Julian Burg – recording
- Alex Pasco – recording
- Laura Sisk – recording
- Rick Nowels – recording
- Kieron Menzies – recording
- Trevor Yasuda – recording
- Ted Jensen – mastering

=== Artwork ===
- Karl Lindman – art direction
- Brendan Dunne – design
- Josh Olins – photography

== Charts ==
=== Weekly charts ===
| Chart (2014) | Peak position |
|---|---|
| Australian Albums (ARIA) | 38 |
| Austrian Albums (Ö3 Austria) | 50 |
| Belgian Albums (Ultratop Flanders) | 47 |
| Belgian Albums (Ultratop Wallonia) | 66 |
| Canadian Albums (Billboard) | 17 |
| Danish Albums (Hitlisten) | 19 |
| Dutch Albums (Album Top 100) | 60 |
| Finnish Albums (Suomen virallinen lista) | 24 |
| French Albums (SNEP) | 60 |
| German Albums (Offizielle Top 100) | 43 |
| Greek Albums (IFPI) | 54 |
| Irish Albums (IRMA) | 17 |
| Italian Albums (FIMI) | 61 |
| Norwegian Albums (VG-lista) | 10 |
| Portuguese Albums (AFP) | 29 |
| Scottish Albums (OCC) | 43 |
| Spanish Albums (PROMUSICAE) | 68 |
| Swedish Albums (Sverigetopplistan) | 2 |
| Swiss Albums (Schweizer Hitparade) | 25 |
| UK Albums (OCC) | 33 |
| US Billboard 200 | 29 |
| US Top Alternative Albums (Billboard) | 5 |
| US Top Rock Albums (Billboard) | 9 |

| Chart (2017) | Peak position |
|---|---|
| Czech Albums (ČNS IFPI) | 51 |

=== Year-end charts ===
| Chart (2014) | Position |
|---|---|
| Swedish Albums (Sverigetopplistan) | 91 |

== Release history ==
| Region | Date | Format | Edition | Label | Ref. |
|---|---|---|---|---|---|
| Germany | 2 May 2014 | CD; LP | Standard | Warner | |
| Germany | 2 May 2014 | Digital download | Standard; deluxe | Warner | |
| United Kingdom | 2 May 2014 | Digital download | Standard; deluxe | LL; Atlantic | |
| France | 5 May 2014 | CD; LP | Standard | Warner | |
| France | 5 May 2014 | Digital download | Standard; deluxe | Warner | |
| Sweden | 5 May 2014 | Digital download | Standard; deluxe | LL | |
| United Kingdom | 5 May 2014 | CD; LP | Standard | LL; Atlantic | |
| United States | 6 May 2014 | CD; LP; digital download | Standard | LL; Atlantic | |
| Japan | 7 May 2014 | Digital download | Standard; deluxe | Warner | |
| Sweden | 7 May 2014 | CD; LP | Standard | LL | |
| Australia | 9 May 2014 | CD; digital download | Deluxe | Warner | |
