= No Rest for the Wicked (song) =

Single by Lykke Li

from the album I Never Learn
- Released: 20 March 2014
- Genre: Dream pop
- Length: 3:43
- Label: LL; Atlantic
- Songwriters: Lykke Li; Björn Yttling
- Producers: Lykke Li; Björn Yttling

Lykke Li singles chronology
"I'm Waiting Here" (2013)	"No Rest for the Wicked" (2014)	"No One Ever Loved" (2014)

Music video
- "No Rest for the Wicked" on YouTube

"No Rest for the Wicked" is a song by Swedish singer and songwriter Lykke Li from her third studio album, I Never Learn (2014). It was released as the album's lead single on 20 March 2014 through LL Recordings. A remix of the song, featuring American rapper ASAP Rocky, was released on 28 April 2014.

== Background ==
"No Rest for the Wicked" was written and produced by Lykke Li and Björn Yttling for Li's third studio album, I Never Learn (2014). The singer spent two-and-a-half years writing the album in Los Angeles, California, following the end of a long-term romantic relationship. "No Rest for the Wicked", the second song she penned for the album, was written in Sweden, prior to her move to Los Angeles. Regarding the song, she told The Guardian, "I wrote it in Sweden when I was packing up my shit, and I'd just gotten out of a relationship and it was a horrible time. I just had the hurt, shame, sadness, guilt, longing." The vocal track used in the final song is a demo. Yttling played the acoustic guitar, the Moog Taurus and the zither on "No Rest for the Wicked". Erik Arvinder, Anderas Forsman, Erik Holm and Ketil Solberg played the violin, while Cecilia Linné played the cello and Anders Pettersson played the steel guitar. Mariam Wallentin provided additional vocals.

== Critical reception ==
"No Rest for the Wicked" garnered positive reviews from music critics. Michael Cragg of The Guardian called it "vintage Lykke Li". He noted that while it is "obviously incredibly sad", it still manages to never be "morose or cloying" as "there's something almost uplifting about wallowing in [Li's] pain". Jamieson Cox of Time felt the song was a "strong preview" to I Never Learn. Alex Young of Consequence of Sound said it is not a "prototypical sad song" as the accented piano instrumentation and the "booming" chorus add "a sense of hope" in the midst of the melancholic lyrics. While reviewing I Never Learn for The Independent, Andy Gill recommended readers to download "No Rest for the Wicked", while Sara Harowitz of Exclaim! picked it as a standout on the album, complementing its drum beats. MusicOMH writer John Murphy likened it to Li's previous singles "I Follow Rivers" and "Sadness Is a Blessing", labeling it a "future classic". Drowned in Sound's Tom Fenwick named it a "truly captivating single".

== Remix ==
A remixed version of "No Rest for the Wicked", featuring American rapper ASAP Rocky, premiered exclusively on Beats Music on 21 April 2014. The remix was later made available for download on digital retailers on 28 April 2014. While the instrumentation and Li's vocals are untouched, the remix adds a "thumping" bass line and a rap verse by ASAP Rocky. Corinne Cummings of Rolling Stone rated the remix three stars out of five, writing, "The combination doesn't always exceed the sum of its parts, but Sad Rocky's lyrics – 'If love don't work, it just gon' hurt/It all goes bad, it just get worse' – have their charms." John Surico of Spin commented that "So as unlikely as the Swedish singer's recruitment of ASAP Rocky for a remix may look on paper, the team-up actually makes some solid sense."

== Music video ==
The music video for "No Rest for the Wicked" was directed by Tarik Saleh and released on 10 April 2014.

== Track listings ==
- Digital download
1. "No Rest for the Wicked" – 3:43

E-Dubble - no rest for the wicked

- Digital EP – Remixes
1. "No Rest for the Wicked" (featuring ASAP Rocky) – 3:03
2. "No Rest for the Wicked" (Klangkarussell remix) – 3:37
3. "No Rest for the Wicked" (Joris Voorn remix) – 6:06
4. "No Rest for the Wicked" (Ten Ven remix) – 6:19
- Digital download – ASAP Rocky remix
1. "No Rest for the Wicked" (featuring ASAP Rocky) – 3:03

== Credits and personnel ==
Credits adapted from the single CD liner notes of "No Rest for the Wicked".

- Lykke Li – lead vocals, production, songwriting
- Björn Yttling – production, songwriting, acoustic guitar, Taurus, zither
- Anders Pettersson – steel guitar
- Mariam Wallentin – additional vocals
- Andreas Forsman – violin
- Ketil Solberg – violin
- Erik Arvinder – violin
- Erik Holm – violin
- Cecilia Linné – cello

== Charts ==
Chart performance for "No Rest for the Wicked"
Chart (2014)	Peak position
Belgium (Ultratip Bubbling Under Flanders)	19
Belgium (Ultratip Bubbling Under Wallonia)	38
France (SNEP)	161
Hungary (Stream Top 40)	37

Chart performance for "No Rest for the Wicked (Robin Schulz Edit)"
Chart (2015)	Peak position
Belgium (Ultratip Bubbling Under Flanders)	13
Belgium (Ultratop 50 Wallonia)	25
