= The Twilight Saga: New Moon (soundtrack) =

2009 soundtrack albums

The Twilight Saga: New Moon (Original Motion Picture Soundtrack)

Soundtrack album by various artists
- Released: October 16, 2009
- Recorded: Various times
- Genres: Pop rock; alternative rock; indie rock
- Length: 57:21
- Label: Atlantic
- Producer: Alexandra Patsavas

Singles from The Twilight Saga: New Moon (Original Motion Picture Soundtrack)
- 1. "Meet Me on the Equinox" Released: September 13, 2009; 2. "Solar Midnite" Released: December 12, 2009; 3. "Satellite Heart"

The Twilight Saga: New Moon (Original Motion Picture Soundtrack) is the soundtrack to the 2009 film The Twilight Saga: New Moon. The score was composed by Alexandre Desplat while the rest of the soundtrack was chosen by music supervisor Alexandra Patsavas, who also produced the Twilight soundtrack. The album was released on October 16, 2009 by Patsavas' Chop Shop label, in conjunction with Atlantic Records.

== New Moon: Original Motion Picture Soundtrack ==
New Moon's soundtrack comprises songs that are all original and exclusive to the soundtrack and are performed by various indie rock and alternative rock artists. New Moon director Chris Weitz stated that the soundtrack would feature songs from Radiohead, Muse, and Band of Skulls. Death Cab for Cutie contributed the soundtrack's lead single, a song written specifically for the film called "Meet Me on the Equinox", which debuted September 13 during the MTV Video Music Awards. Bassist Nick Harmer says, "We wrote 'Meet Me On the Equinox' to reflect the celestial themes and motifs that run throughout the Twilight series and we wanted to capture that desperate feeling of endings and beginnings that so strongly affect the main characters."

The music video for "Meet Me on the Equinox" premiered on October 7, 2009, and includes clips from the movie. The English rock band Muse contributed a remix of their song "I Belong to You", which appears in its original form on their 2009 album The Resistance. St. Vincent collaborated with Bon Iver's Justin Vernon to create a song called "Rosyln". When describing the song, she said, "[Justin] sings in his beautiful falsetto and I'm actually singing very, very low... I think there's something vampirey and creepy about the two of us singing together. It's a simple, stripped-down kind of song." The soundtrack originally had a release date of October 20, 2009, but the date was moved up four days to October 16 due to "overwhelming and unprecedented demand".

=== Track listing ===
New Moon – Standard edition
No.	Title	Writer(s)	Artist	Length
1.	"Meet Me on the Equinox"	Benjamin Gibbard; Nicholas Harmer; Jason McGerr; Christopher Walla	Death Cab for Cutie	3:44
2.	"Friends"	Russell Marsden; Emma Richardson; Matthew Hayward	Band of Skulls	3:09
3.	"Hearing Damage"	Thom Yorke	Thom Yorke	5:04
4.	"Possibility"	Lykke Li Zachrisson	Lykke Li	5:06
5.	"A White Demon Love Song"	The Killers	The Killers	3:33
6.	"Satellite Heart"	Anya Marina	Anya Marina	3:33
7.	"I Belong to You" (New Moon remix)	Matthew Bellamy	Muse	3:11
8.	"Rosyln"	Justin Vernon	Bon Iver and St. Vincent	4:49
9.	"Done All Wrong"	Black Rebel Motorcycle Club	Black Rebel Motorcycle Club	2:49
10.	"Monsters"	Steve Schiltz	Hurricane Bells	3:16
11.	"The Violet Hour"	Alex Brown Church	Sea Wolf	3:32
12.	"Shooting the Moon"	Damian Kulash; Tim Nordwind	OK Go	3:18
13.	"Slow Life" (with Victoria Legrand)	Christopher Bear; Christopher Taylor; Edward Droste; Daniel Rossen	Grizzly Bear	4:21
14.	"No Sound but the Wind"	Smith; Urbanowicz; Leetch; Lay	Editors	3:48
15.	"New Moon (The Meadow)"	Alexandre Desplat	Alexandre Desplat	4:08
Total length:				57:21

New Moon – Deluxe edition
No.	Title	Artist	Length
16.	"Solar Midnite" (bonus track)	Lupe Fiasco	3:32
17.	"All I Believe In" (bonus track)	Amadou & Mariam and The Magic Numbers	4:04
18.	"Die Fledermaus – Duettino: Ach, ich darf nicht hin zu dir"	The APM Orchestra	1:09
19.	"Meet Me on the Equinox" (music video)	Death Cab for Cutie	3:40
Total length:			69:46

=== Marketing ===
Hot Topic locations across the United States hosted New Moon soundtrack listening parties on the release date, October 16, where fans were able to listen to the entire soundtrack and hear special messages from the featured bands. The album's CD booklet folds out into a New Moon poster.

International versions of the soundtrack are available in certain countries, featuring bonus tracks from "local" artists. For example, Mexican Grammy and Latin Grammy nominee Ximena Sariñana is featured on Spanish language versions of the soundtrack, with the song "Frente al Mar" ("In front of the Sea").

=== Reception ===
Professional ratings
Review scores
Source	Rating
AllMusic	2/5 stars
Chart Attack	3/5 stars
Dose	4/5 stars
Drowned in Sound	(8/10)
Entertainment Weekly	(A)
IGN	(9.0/10)
The New York Times	(favorable)
NME	(6/10)
Pitchfork Media	(5.4/10)
Rolling Stone	3.5/5 stars

Initial critical response to the New Moon soundtrack was generally favorable. At Metacritic, which assigns a normalized rating out of 100 to reviews from mainstream critics, the album has received an average score of 70, based on 11 reviews.

=== Chart performance ===
The soundtrack debuted at number two on the Billboard 200 albums chart, and climbed to number one a week later after selling 153,000 copies in its first full week of release. It made history as the first time ever a soundtrack and its sequel have both reached the #1 spot on the chart. The album was certified Platinum by RIAA, and has sold 1,305,000 copies in the US as of August 2013.

In New Zealand, it was certified Gold on October 18, 2009, selling over 7,500 copies in its first two days of release. The album debuted at number two and was certified Platinum after its first week of release, selling over 15,000 copies. In Australia, the soundtrack rose to number one on the iTunes Store and has largely stayed in the top five since its release. It debuted at number two on the ARIA Albums Chart in the week beginning October 26, 2009, and was certified Platinum in its first week. In Mexico, the album is jumped to No. 1 on the international album charts and No. 4 on the main chart after five weeks inside the chart, caused by the success of the film. In the UK, the album debuted at number one on the compilations chart.

=== Weekly charts ===
Chart (2009-2010)	Peak position
Australian Albums (ARIA)	2
Austrian Albums (Ö3 Austria)	4
Belgian Albums (Ultratop Flanders)	35
Belgian Albums (Ultratop Wallonia)	18
Canadian Albums (Billboard)	2
Danish Albums (Hitlisten)	36
Dutch Albums (Album Top 100)	66
Finnish Albums (Suomen virallinen lista)	25
French Albums (SNEP)	16
German Albums (Offizielle Top 100)	3
Greek Albums (IFPI)	8
Hungarian Albums (MAHASZ)	27
Mexican Albums (AMPROFON)	4
Mexican International Albums Chart	1
New Zealand Albums (RMNZ)	2
Spanish Albums (Promusicae)	12
Swiss Albums (Schweizer Hitparade)	9
US Billboard 200	1
US Top Rock Albums (Billboard)	1
US Soundtrack Albums (Billboard)	1

=== Year-end charts ===
Chart (2009)	Position
Australian Albums (ARIA)	27
Austrian Albums (Ö3 Austria)	52
French Albums (SNEP)	107
German Albums (Offizielle Top 100)	92
New Zealand Albums (RMNZ)	41
US Billboard 200	74
US Top Rock Albums (Billboard)	22
US Soundtrack Albums (Billboard)	7

Chart (2010)	Position
US Billboard 200	31
US Top Rock Albums (Billboard)	3
US Soundtrack Albums (Billboard)	4

=== Certifications ===
Region	Certification	Certified units/sales
Australia (ARIA)	Platinum	70,000^{^}
Austria (IFPI Austria)	Gold	10,000^{*}
Canada (Music Canada)	Platinum	80,000^{^}
France (SNEP)	Gold	50,000^{*}
Germany (BVMI)	Gold	100,000^{^}
Hungary (MAHASZ)	Gold	3,000^{^}
Italy (FIMI)	Gold	25,000^{*}
Mexico (AMPROFON)	Gold	30,000^{^}
New Zealand (RMNZ)	Platinum	15,000^{^}
Poland (ZPAV)	Gold	10,000^{*}
United Kingdom (BPI)	Gold	100,000^{^}
United States (RIAA)	Platinum	1,000,000^{^}
^{*} Sales figures based on certification alone.^{^} Shipments figures based on certification alone.

== The Twilight Saga: New Moon (The Score) ==
The Twilight Saga: New Moon (The Score)

Film score by Alexandre Desplat
- Released: November 24, 2009
- Recorded: Air Studios in London and Studios Guillaume Tell in Paris
- Genre: Orchestral
- Length: 73:35
- Label: Atlantic Records
- Producer: Alexandre Desplat

The Twilight Saga: New Moon (The Score) was composed by Alexandre Desplat and performed by the London Symphony Orchestra. He replaced Carter Burwell, who wrote the score for the previous film, Twilight (2008). Weitz has a working relationship with Desplat, who scored one of his previous films, The Golden Compass (2007).

=== Track listing ===
No.	Title	Length
1.	"New Moon"	3:22
2.	"Bella Dreams"	2:06
3.	"Romeo & Juliet"	2:52
4.	"Volturi Waltz"	1:24
5.	"Blood Sample"	1:16
6.	"Edward Leaves"	5:07
7.	"Werewolves"	4:29
8.	"I Need You"	1:42
9.	"Break Up"	2:09
10.	"Memories of Edward"	1:47
11.	"Wolves V. Vampire"	4:34
12.	"Victoria"	2:08
13.	"Almost a Kiss"	2:15
14.	"Adrenaline"	2:26
15.	"Dreamcatcher"	3:33
16.	"To Volterra"	9:19
17.	"You're Alive"	2:16
18.	"The Volturi"	8:48
19.	"The Cullens"	4:35
20.	"Marry Me, Bella"	4:07
21.	"Full Moon"	3:20
Total length:		73:35

=== Reception ===
Professional ratings
Review scores
Source	Rating
Filmtracks	4/5 stars
Movie Music UK	4.5/5 stars
Movie Wave	4/5 stars

The score has received critical acclaim from many film music critics.

=== Chart performance ===
Chart	Peak position	Sales/ shipments
U.S. Billboard 200	80	100,000
