= So Sad So Sexy =

Studio album by Lykke Li
- Released: 8 June 2018
- Studio: Green Oak (Los Angeles); Larrabee (Los Angeles)
- Genre: Pop; R&B
- Length: 34:06
- Label: RCA
- Producer: Malay; Jeff Bhasker; T-Minus; Jonny Coffer; Rostam; Skrillex; Ali Payami; DJ Dahi; Kid Harpoon; Emile Haynie; Illangelo; FrancisGotHeat

Lykke Li chronology
I Never Learn (2014)	So Sad So Sexy (2018)	Eyeye (2022)

Singles from So Sad So Sexy
- 1. "Deep End" Released: 19 April 2018; 2. "Hard Rain" Released: 19 April 2018; 3. "Utopia" Released: 13 May 2018; 4. "Sex Money Feelings Die" Released: 29 May 2018; 5. "Two Nights" Released: 29 May 2018

So Sad So Sexy (stylized in all lowercase) is the fourth studio album by Swedish singer Lykke Li, released on 8 June 2018 by RCA. The album was preceded by the release of the singles "Deep End", "Hard Rain", "Utopia", "Sex Money Feelings Die" and "Two Nights" featuring Aminé. Ilsey Juber co-wrote the majority of the album, which is musically influenced by trap. Malay served as an executive producer, with further production by Li's then-husband Jeff Bhasker, T-Minus, DJ Dahi, Illangelo, Emile Haynie, Jonny Coffer, Kid Harpoon and Rostam Batmanglij, among others.

== Release and promotion ==
Lykke Li announced So Sad So Sexy on 19 April alongside the release of the first two singles from the record, "Deep End" and "Hard Rain". She released the third single "Utopia" on Mother's Day with an intimate video directed by Clara Cullen. On 29 May, she released two more singles, "Sex Money Feelings Die" and "Two Nights" featuring Aminé. On 10 April, Li shared a trailer for the album featuring a snippet of the title track, which Clash called a "silken pop groove that display[s] Lykke at her effortless best". Under the Radar called the 90-second album trailer "mysterious" and noted Li appearing in different settings wearing various outfits.

Li played various European and North American festivals including the Osheaga Festival in support of the album in mid-2018.

== Critical reception ==
Professional ratings
Aggregate scores
Source	Rating
AnyDecentMusic?	6.8/10
Metacritic	71/100
Review scores
Source	Rating
AllMusic	4/5 stars
The A.V. Club	B−
Consequence of Sound	B
The Guardian	4/5 stars
The Independent	4/5 stars
The Irish Times	4/5 stars
NME	4/5 stars
Pitchfork	6.4/10
Q	4/5 stars
Rolling Stone	2/5 stars

At Metacritic, which assigns a normalised rating out of 100 to reviews from mainstream publications, the album received an average score of 71 based on 23 reviews, indicating "generally favorable reviews". Ilana Kaplan of The Independent wrote, "Li's latest foray in pop is a brilliant display of growth, both personally and professionally. She once again proves that there's no such thing as boring in her music." Consequence of Sound's Grant Sharples said, "Although the trap-influenced style wears thin at times, so sad so sexy is a superb reinvention of Lykke Li." Neil Z. Yeung of AllMusic said, "Li's defeat and grief are palpable, yet she delivers with such grace and control, which offers a glimmer of hope for the fellow romantically downtrodden. With production to match, so sad so sexy succeeds in providing a relatable therapy session for love's final gasps."

In a less positive review, Exclaim! critic Jenna Mohammed said the album "is an unusual blend of pop and R&B inspiration, but it's not a memorable album. Lykke Li scratches the bare surface of the talent she possesses, making you wish there was just a little more energy." Similarly, Claire Biddles of The Line of Best Fit wrote, "The album's repeated motif of smoking and cigarettes as an addiction metaphor feels try-hard rather than smart. The best tracks are those that transpose the drama of Li's best work to the album's more explicitly pop context." Slant Magazine's Josh Goller wrote, "So Sad So Sexy is a sleek, homogeneous pop-oriented album that feels both conceptually half-formed and technically fussed-over." For Pitchfork, Stacey Anderson wrote that "with festival-ready hooks and trap-inspired production, Lykke Li delivers another record about an unraveling romance and the fraught sexuality of its final moments with diminishing returns", and that "her traumas are too often muted by abstraction and unspecificity ... it is beginning to lose its impact".

== Track listing ==
So Sad So Sexy track listing
No.	Title	Writer(s)	Producer(s)	Length
1.	"Hard Rain"	Lykke Li; Rostam Batmanglij	Batmanglij	3:30
2.	"Deep End"	Li; Ilsey Juber; Jeff Bhasker; James Ryan Ho; Tyler Williams; Stephen Kozmeniuk	Bhasker; Malay; T-Minus; FrancisGotHeat	3:05
3.	"Two Nights" (featuring Aminé)	Li; Juber; Jonny Coffer; Bhasker; Ho; Adam Daniel	Malay; Bhasker; Coffer; Skrillex^{[a]}	3:24
4.	"Last Piece"	Li; Juber; Ali Payami	Payami	3:05
5.	"Jaguars in the Air"	Li; Juber; Bhasker; Ho; Williams	Bhasker; Malay; T-Minus	3:37
6.	"Sex Money Feelings Die"	Li; Dacoury Natche; Juber; Thomas Edward Percy Hull; Sarah Aarons; Ho	Malay; DJ Dahi; Kid Harpoon^{[b]}	2:19
7.	"So Sad So Sexy"	Li; Juber; Emile Haynie; Bhasker; Andrew Wyatt; Ho	Malay; Bhasker; Haynie	3:32
8.	"Better Alone"	Li; Juber; Carlos Montagnese	Illangelo	4:31
9.	"Bad Woman"	Li; Rick Nowels; Juber; Ho	Malay; Kid Harpoon^{[b]}	3:14
10.	"Utopia"	Li; Juber; Coffer; Ho	Malay; Coffer	3:43
Total length:				34:06

Notes

- ^{^[a]} signifies an additional producer
- ^{^[b]} signifies a vocal producer
- "Hard Rain" features background vocals from Rostam Batmanglij.
- "Deep End", "Jaguars in the Air" and "Better Alone" feature background vocals from Ilsey Juber.
- "So Sad So Sexy" features background vocals from Andrew Wyatt and Ilsey Juber.

== Personnel ==
- Lykke Li – vocals, executive production
- Aminé – vocals (track 3)
- Rostam Batmanglij – production, synthesizer, piano, sampling, drum programming, pitch adjustment, background vocals
- Ali Payami – production, bass, brass band, drums, guitar, keyboards, synthesizer
- Jeff Bhasker – production, guitar, keyboards, piano, Moog synthesizer
- Malay – production, executive production, engineering
- Illangelo – production, mixing
- Skrillex – production, additional production
- Jonny Coffer – production
- DJ Dahi – production
- Emile Haynie – production
- T-Minus – production
- Kid Harpoon – vocal production
- Ilsey Juber – guitar, acoustic guitar, background vocals
- Matt Chamberlain – drums
- Dave Eggar – cello, orchestration, string arrangements, viola
- Brandon Wallace – orchestration, string arrangements
- Scott Desmarais – assistance
- Robin Florent – assistance
- FrancisGotHeat – drum programming
- Ryan Nasci – engineering
- Chris Galland – mixing engineering
- Manny Marroquin – mixing
- Gabe Sackier – remixing
- Dave Kutch – mastering
- Jean-Baptiste – creative direction
- Talbourdet Napoleone – creative direction
- Chloéle Drezen – photography

== Charts ==
Chart performance for So Sad So Sexy
Chart (2018)	Peak position
Australian Albums (ARIA)	78
Belgian Albums (Ultratop Flanders)	55
Belgian Albums (Ultratop Wallonia)	79
Canadian Albums (Billboard)	80
Dutch Albums (Album Top 100)	89
Finnish Albums (Suomen virallinen lista)	31
French Albums (SNEP)	139
German Albums (Offizielle Top 100)	78
Irish Albums (IRMA)	53
New Zealand Heatseeker Albums (RMNZ)	1
Norwegian Albums (VG-lista)	19
Spanish Albums (Promusicae)	88
Swedish Albums (Sverigetopplistan)	10
Swiss Albums (Schweizer Hitparade)	27
UK Albums (OCC)	73
US Billboard 200	173
US Top Alternative Albums (Billboard)	12
