= Youth Novels =

Studio album by Lykke Li
- Released: 30 January 2008
- Studios: Atlantis, Decibel and Högalid (Stockholm, Sweden)
- Genres: Indie pop; synth-pop; dance-pop
- Length: 44:49
- Label: LL
- Producer: Björn Yttling

Lykke Li chronology
Little Bit (2007)	Youth Novels (2008)	Wounded Rhymes (2011)

Singles from Youth Novels
- 1. "Little Bit" Released: 24 September 2007; 2. "I'm Good, I'm Gone" Released: 14 January 2008; 3. "Breaking It Up" Released: 5 May 2008; 4. "Tonight" Released: 18 August 2008

Youth Novels is the debut studio album by Swedish singer and songwriter Lykke Li, released on 30 January 2008 on her own label, the EMI-distributed LL Recordings. The album was entirely produced by Björn Yttling of Swedish indie pop band Peter Bjorn and John and co-produced by Lasse Mårtén. Youth Novels spawned four singles: "Little Bit", "I'm Good, I'm Gone", "Breaking It Up" and "Tonight".

== Critical reception ==
Professional ratings
Aggregate scores
Source	Rating
Metacritic	75/100
Review scores
Source	Rating
AllMusic	4/5 stars
The A.V. Club	B
Drowned in Sound	8/10
The Guardian	3/5 stars
NME	8/10
Pitchfork	7.8/10
PopMatters	7/10
Rolling Stone	3.5/5 stars
Spin	7/10
The Times	4/5 stars

Youth Novels received generally positive reviews from music critics. At Metacritic, which assigns a normalised rating out of 100 to reviews from mainstream publications, the album received an average score of 75, based on 27 reviews. Alex Denney of Drowned in Sound praised the album as "a twinkle-toed debut that dares to suggest what others can only make tediously plain, and leaves us in the rarely-enjoyed position of actually wanting more." PopMatters's Adrien Begrand called it "extraordinary" and described it as "a surprisingly stark-sounding album, an enticing blend of Robyn's unpretentious dance-pop and El Perro del Mar's introspection and tenderness." The Times critic Tom Gatti noted that Yttling gave Youth Novels the same treatment as to Peter Bjorn and John's song "Young Folks", stating that he "[weaves] Lykke Li's girlish, wistful songs of young love and loss into bright pocket symphonies."

In a review for The A.V. Club, Vadim Rizov characterised Youth Novels as "all teasing and heartbreak, with production [...] that plays on empty spaces as much as well-chosen backing", commending Li for "adeptly [straddling] the line between instant gratification and minimalist smarts." Killian Fox of The Observer commented that "[t]he coquettish charm of [Li's] voice, tinged with shyness, is brilliantly offset by Björn Yttling's skeletal productions, which create great pop momentum out of the slightest effects", concluding, "The lyrics lack focus at times but this is a winning debut." Greg Cochrane of NME called the album "[s]imple but sensational". K. Ross Hoffman of AllMusic wrote, "Brimming with ideas but understated, even tentative in executing them, and big on hooks but nervously intimate in presentation, Youth Novels is a curious, decidedly unorthodox but endearing record."

Joe Gross of Spin stated that "[Li's] voice is mousy, the low end juicy, the melodies sketchy, the choruses huge", but found that "[s]he should lose the spoken-word bits, though; they don't even work for her goddess Madonna." Tom Ewing of Pitchfork expressed, "At its frequent best, the record manages to sketch out widescreen hit songs with a remarkable economy of means. At its more occasional worst, the tracks feel frustratingly underthought." Will Hermes of Rolling Stone felt that Li's "frosty squeak is a limited instrument, but she works it, mixing adorable playground scats with spoken-word whispers and parched coos that barely sketch her sugary melodies. The arrangements also dress simple tunes in surprising ways, with odd choral bits and percolating percussion webs that should tease movement from even reluctant hips." The Guardian's Maddy Costa opined that the song "Tonight" "shows what she is capable of: underscored by a melancholy piano, she is darkly seductive", but "[a]fter that has passed, the album just gets increasingly cloying."

=== Accolades ===
Youth Novels earned Li five nominations for the 2009 Swedish Grammis, including Album of the Year, Female Artist of the Year, Live Act of the Year, Composer of the Year (with Yttling) and Lyricist of the Year. The same year, she won the P3 Guld award for Newcomer of the Year and was nominated for Pop Artist of the Year.

Year-end lists for Youth Novels
Publication	Accolade	Rank	Ref.
Complex	The 100 Best Albums of The Complex Decade	54	
Consequence of Sound	The Top 100 Albums (2008)	41	
Drowned in Sound	50 Albums of 2008	41	
musicOMH	Top 50 Best Albums of 2008	30	
NME	Top 50 Albums of 2008	44	
Paste	Top 50 Albums of 2008	46	
Pitchfork	The 50 Best Albums of 2008	45	
PopMatters	The Best Albums of 2008	40	
Q	The 50 Best Albums of 2008	37	
Spin	The 40 Best Albums of 2008	36	
The Times	The 100 Best Pop Albums of the Noughties	97	
The Village Voice	Pazz & Jop 2008	81	

== Commercial performance ==
In Li's native Sweden, Youth Novels debuted and peaked at number three on the Swedish Albums Chart for the week of 7 February 2008, behind Johnny Logan & Friends' The Irish Connection and Van Morrison's Still on Top – The Greatest Hits. It spent 20 non-consecutive weeks altogether on the chart, including four re-entries in 2008 and one on 30 January 2009. The album charted for a sole week in both the United Kingdom and Ireland, reaching numbers 112 and 75, respectively.

In continental Europe, Youth Novels reached number 36 in Norway, number 56 in Belgium, number 75 in the Netherlands and number 143 in France. It also peaked at number 18 on Billboard's Top Heatseekers in the United States, and at number seven on the ARIA Hitseekers chart in Australia. As of April 2014, the album had sold 106,000 copies in the United States.

== Track listing ==
All music is composed by Lykke Li and Björn Yttling.

No.	Title	Lyrics	Length
1.	"Melodies & Desires"	Li; Nils-Erik Sandberg	3:52
2.	"Dance, Dance, Dance"	Li	3:41
3.	"I'm Good, I'm Gone"	Li; Yttling	3:09
4.	"Let It Fall"	Li	2:42
5.	"My Love"	Li	4:36
6.	"Little Bit"	Li	4:33
7.	"Hanging High"	Li	4:07
8.	"This Trumpet in My Head"	Li; Sandberg	2:36
9.	"Complaint Department"	Yttling	4:32
10.	"Breaking It Up"	Li	3:41
11.	"Time Flies"	Li	3:21
12.	"Window Blues"	Li; Sandberg	3:59

International edition
No.	Title	Lyrics	Length
6.	"Tonight"	Li	4:13
7.	"Little Bit"	Li	4:33
8.	"Hanging High"	Li	4:07
9.	"This Trumpet in My Head"	Li; Sandberg	1:42
10.	"Complaint Department"	Yttling	4:32
11.	"Breaking It Up"	Li	3:41
12.	"Everybody but Me"	Li	3:18
13.	"Time Flies"	Li	3:21
14.	"Window Blues"	Li; Sandberg	3:59

iTunes Store special edition bonus tracks (Note: Excluding Denmark, Finland, Italy, Japan, Norway, Portugal, Sweden and the United Kingdom)
No.	Title	Lyrics	Length
15.	"I'm Good, I'm Gone" (Black Kids remix)	Li; Yttling	3:23
16.	"Little Bit" (CSS remix)	Li	4:40
17.	"Everybody but Me" (DiskJokke remix)	Li	7:31

iTunes Store deluxe edition bonus tracks (Note: Excluding Canada, Denmark, Finland, Japan, Norway, Spain, Sweden and the United States)
No.	Title	Lyrics	Length
15.	"I'm Good, I'm Gone" (Black Kids remix)	Li; Yttling	3:23
16.	"Little Bit" (CSS remix)	Li	4:40
17.	"Everybody but Me" (DiskJokke Remix)	Li	7:31
18.	"Little Bit" (music video)		3:51
19.	"I'm Good, I'm Gone" (music video)		3:10
20.	"Breaking It Up" (music video)		3:40

== Personnel ==
Credits adapted from the liner notes of Youth Novels.

Musicians

- Lykke Li – vocals
- Björn Yttling – piano (tracks 1, 3, 7, 9–12); synthesizer (tracks 1, 3, 5, 9, 10); acoustic guitar (track 1–5, 7, 8, 12); celeste (tracks 1, 3, 7); vibraphone (track 1); backing vocals (tracks 2, 5, 10, 12); snare (track 2); electric bass (tracks 3, 5, 9, 10); percussion (tracks 3, 5, 6); drums (track 4); harpsichord (tracks 5, 7); string arrangement (tracks 5, 10); keyboards, mandolin (track 6); foot stomp (track 7); rocksichord (track 12)
- Walter Sear – theremin (tracks 1, 9, 12)
- Per "Ruskträsk" Johansson – saxophone (tracks 1, 2, 4, 5); flute (track 5)
- John Eriksson – percussion (tracks 2, 3, 4, 9, 11); drums (tracks 2, 12); cymbal (track 6); Mellotron (track 11)
- Lars Skoglund – drums (tracks 3, 5, 11); percussion (tracks 3, 9); hi-hat (track 10)
- Mapei – backing vocals (tracks 3, 5, 9, 10)
- Lissy Trullie – backing vocals (tracks 3, 5, 9, 10)
- Johan "Zilverzurfarn" Zachrisson – acoustic guitar, foot stomp (track 4)
- Dylan Von Wagner – backing vocals (track 5)
- Peter Morén – backing vocals (tracks 5, 12)
- Andreas Forsman – violin (tracks 5, 10)
- Erik Arvinder – violin (tracks 5, 10)
- Erik Holm – viola (tracks 5, 10)
- Henrik Söderquist – cello (tracks 5, 10)
- Markus Ollikainen – trumpet (track 8)
- Neil Lipuma – tambourine (track 9)
- The Suzan – backing vocals (track 10)
- Lasse Mårtén – percussion (track 10)

Technical

- Björn Yttling – production, recording, mixing
- Lasse Mårtén – co-production, recording, additional recordings, mixing
- Janne Hansson – recording
- Matt Azzarto – additional recordings
- Bil Emmons – additional recordings
- Tommy Andersson – engineering assistance
- Tom Gloady – engineering assistance
- Neil Lipuma – engineering assistance
- Henrik Jonsson – mastering

Artwork

- Sandberg&Timonen – artwork
- Marcus Palmqvist – photography

=== International edition ===
- Björn Yttling – electric bass, piano (on "Tonight" and "Everybody but Me"); rocksichord, celeste, organ, percussion (on "Tonight"); flute, trumpet (on "Everybody but Me")
- Lars Skoglund – cowbell (on "Tonight"); drums (on "Everybody but Me")
- Per "Ruskträsk" Johansson – flute (on "Tonight")
- John Eriksson – percussion (on "Everybody but Me")

== Charts ==
=== Weekly charts ===
Weekly chart performance for Youth Novels
Chart (2008–2009)	Peak position
Australian Hitseekers Albums (ARIA)	7
Belgian Albums (Ultratop Flanders)	56
Dutch Albums (Album Top 100)	75
French Albums (SNEP)	143
Irish Albums (IRMA)	75
Norwegian Albums (VG-lista)	36
Swedish Albums (Sverigetopplistan)	3
UK Albums (OCC)	112
US Heatseekers Albums (Billboard)	18

=== Year-end charts ===
Year-end chart performance for Youth Novels
Chart (2008)	Position
Swedish Albums (Sverigetopplistan)	90

== Release history ==
Release history for Youth Novels
Region	Date	Label	Ref.
Sweden	30 January 2008	LL	
Ireland	6 June 2008	Atlantic	
United Kingdom	9 June 2008	Atlantic	
Netherlands	15 August 2008	Warner	
United States	19 August 2008	Atlantic	
Australia	5 September 2008	Warner	
France	29 September 2008	Warner	
