= Lars Skoglund =

Norwegian composer and musician (born 1974)

- Born: 27 March 1974 (age 52); Bodø, Norway
- Genres: Contemporary classical, jazz
- Occupations: Composer, musician
- Instruments: Guitar, drums, percussion
- Website: larsskoglund.com

Lars Skoglund (born March 27, 1974, in Bodø, Norway) is a Norwegian composer and musician.

== Biography ==
Skoglund was fascinated by pop and rock music at a young. He started playing guitar and drums in different bands. He also became interested in contemporary classical music, with a special attraction to composers like Charles Ives, Anton Webern, and Pierre Boulez. After finishing studies of musicology and philosophy at the Norwegian University of Science and Technology in Trondheim, he attended the Rotterdam Conservatory (1999-2003). He earned a diploma in jazz, electronics, and classical composition, supervised by Klaas de Vries, Paul van Brugge, and Rene Uijlenhoet.

Skoglund work as freelance composer and was composer in residence from 2006 to 2008 for the Department of Art Studies at the Tromsø University College in Northern-Norway. He has composed music for various ensembles, including for the Domestica Ensemble, and for various dance performances.

== Honors ==
- 2004: NOG Jonge Composistenprijs for Sentences during the Project Young Composers of Holland Symfonia
