= Lykke Li =

Swedish singer (born 1986)

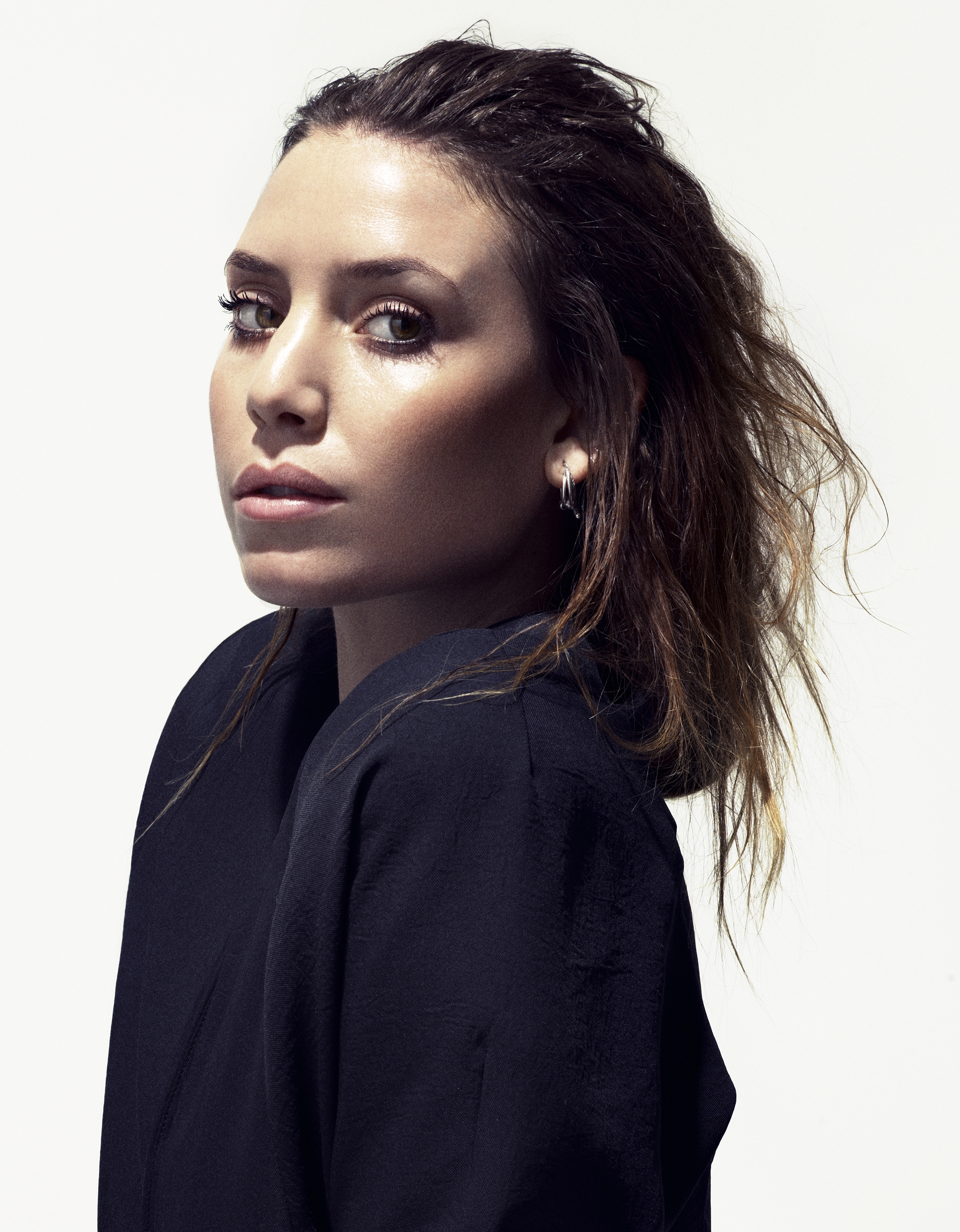
- Lykke Li in 2010

Background information
- Born: Li Lykke Timotej Zachrisson; 18 March 1986 (age 40); Ystad, Sweden
- Genres: Indie pop; dream pop; art pop; electropop; dance-pop
- Occupations: Singer; songwriter; model; actress
- Years active: 2007–present
- Labels: LL; Ingrid; Atlantic; RCA; PIAS; EMI
- Member of: LIV
- Website: lykkeli.com

Li Lykke Timotej Zachrisson (born 18 March 1986), professionally known as Lykke Li (Swedish pronunciation: [ˈlʏ̂kːɛ ˈliː] LEWK-eh LEE), is a Swedish singer, songwriter, model and actress. Her music often blends elements of indie pop, dream pop and electronic. Her debut studio album, Youth Novels, was released in 2008, and has been followed by Wounded Rhymes (2011), I Never Learn (2014), So Sad So Sexy (2018), Eyeye (2022), and The Afterparty (2026). She is best known for her biggest hit single to date, "I Follow Rivers".

== Early life ==
Li Lykke Timotej Zachrisson was born in Ystad, Skåne; her mother, Kärsti Stiege, was a photographer, and her father, Johan Zachrisson (stage name Zilverzurfarn), is a member of the Swedish punk-reggae band Dag Vag. Her younger brother, Zacharias Zachrisson (a.k.a. Vacation Forever), is also a musician. The family moved to Stockholm when Zachrisson was a toddler and when she was six moved to a mountaintop in Portugal where they lived for five years. The family also spent time in Lisbon and Morocco, and winters in Nepal and India. She moved to Brooklyn, New York City, for three months when she was 19. She returned when she was 21 to record her album.

== Career ==
=== 2007–2010: Career beginnings and Youth Novels ===
Lykke Li released her first EP, Little Bit, in 2007. Stereogum named her an artist to watch in October 2007 and described her music as a mix of soul, electro and "powdered-sugar pop". Lykke Li's debut album, Youth Novels, was released on LL Recordings in the Nordic region on 30 January 2008 and received a wider European release in June 2008. The album was produced by Björn Yttling of Peter Bjorn and John and Lasse Mårtén and was reportedly inspired by a previous relationship of three years. It was released in the United States on 19 August 2008. The album was released in the United Kingdom in June 2008, promoted by a performance of "Little Bit" on Later... with Jools Holland on 25 May 2008.

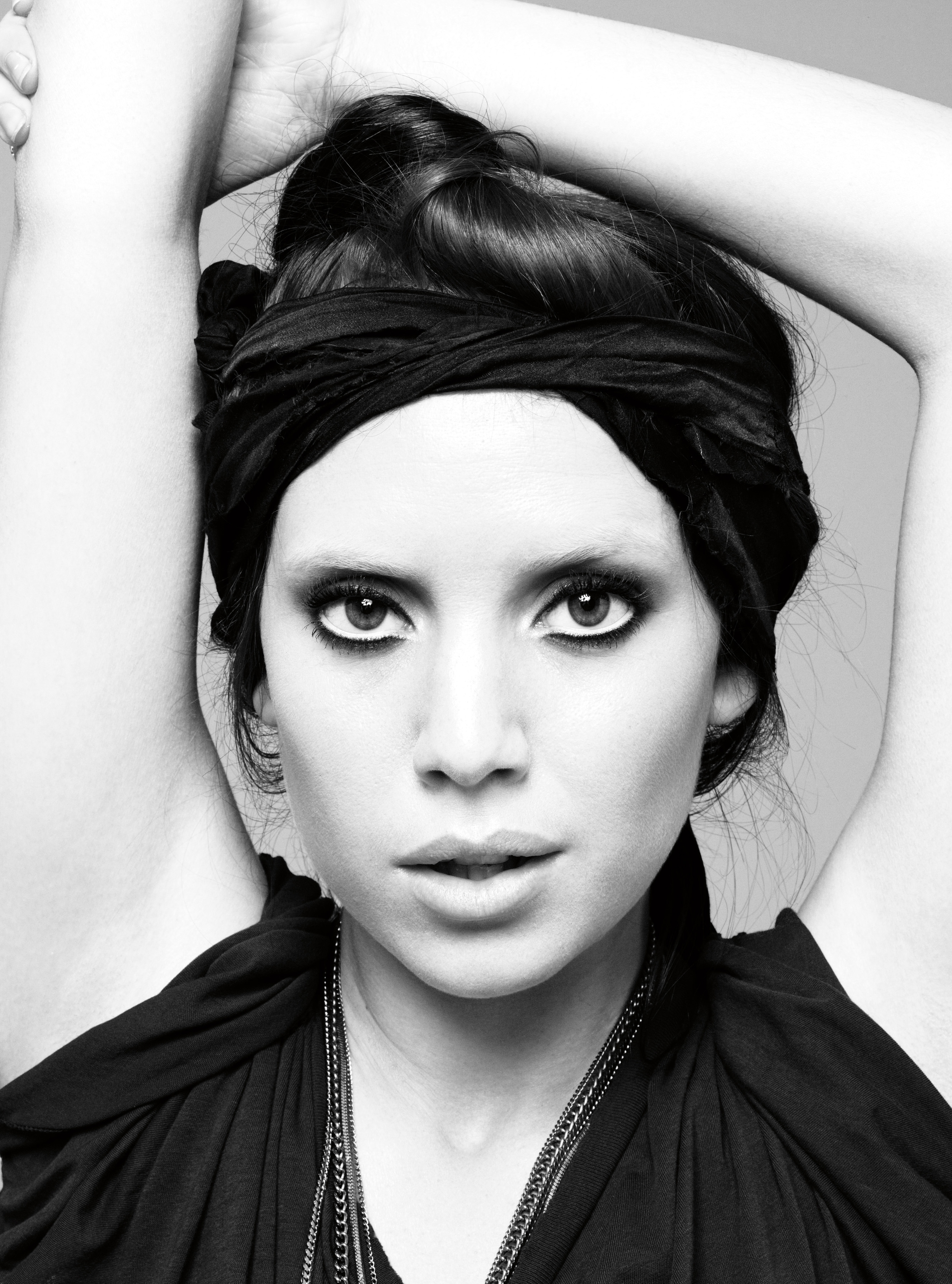
Lykke Li in 2009

Lykke Li performed live with a pared-down drum kit, a necklace made out of percussive instruments, a guitar, a bass and a microphone. Youth Novels was placed on many of the year's Best Of lists and saw Lykke Li sell out tours, including sets at festivals Glastonbury, Coachella and Lollapalooza. She appeared on Late Night with Conan O'Brien.

She appeared on Swedish musician Kleerup's self-titled album, contributing vocals to the track "Until We Bleed". She also worked with Norwegian electronic duo Röyksopp on their 2009 album Junior, contributing vocals to "Miss It So Much" and "Were You Ever Wanted". Lykke Li appeared on Last Call with Carson Daly on 18 February 2009. She covered "Knocked Up", originally recorded by Kings of Leon who had approached Lykke to cover a song of her choice, and "Gifted" in which she performs with Kanye West. Lykke Li performed at the 2009 Coachella Valley Music and Arts Festival on 19 April and the 2009 Lollapalooza festival on 8 August as part of the promotional tour for Youth Novels.

Her song "I'm Good, I'm Gone" featured in the game FIFA 09, whilst a remixed version was featured in the 2009 horror film Sorority Row. The song "Possibility" was written for the 2009 film The Twilight Saga: New Moon. Lykke Li had been asked to write a song to the film soundtrack but was reluctant to commit to the project. It was after she had seen an early screening of the film that she decided she wanted to contribute to the soundtrack. The soundtrack was released on 16 October 2009.

=== 2011–2013: Wounded Rhymes ===
The song "Get Some" was featured in the 15th episode of the first season of Hawaii Five-0 titled "Kai e'e" which aired 23 January 2011. The song was also used in ABC Family's drama Pretty Little Liars in the 18th episode of the second season which was titled "A Kiss Before Lying" which aired 30 January 2012. The song was also used in the 19th episode of the second season of The CW's The Vampire Diaries, titled "Klaus" and originally aired 21 April 2011, and in the show Don't Trust the B— in Apartment 23 as well as the sixth episode of the first season of Teen Wolf, titled "Heart Monitor" and originally aired 4 July 2011. The song was also used in the film Premium Rush as one of its soundtracks. The song "Unrequited Love" was used in episode 19 ("The Wheels of Justice"), season four of The Good Wife.

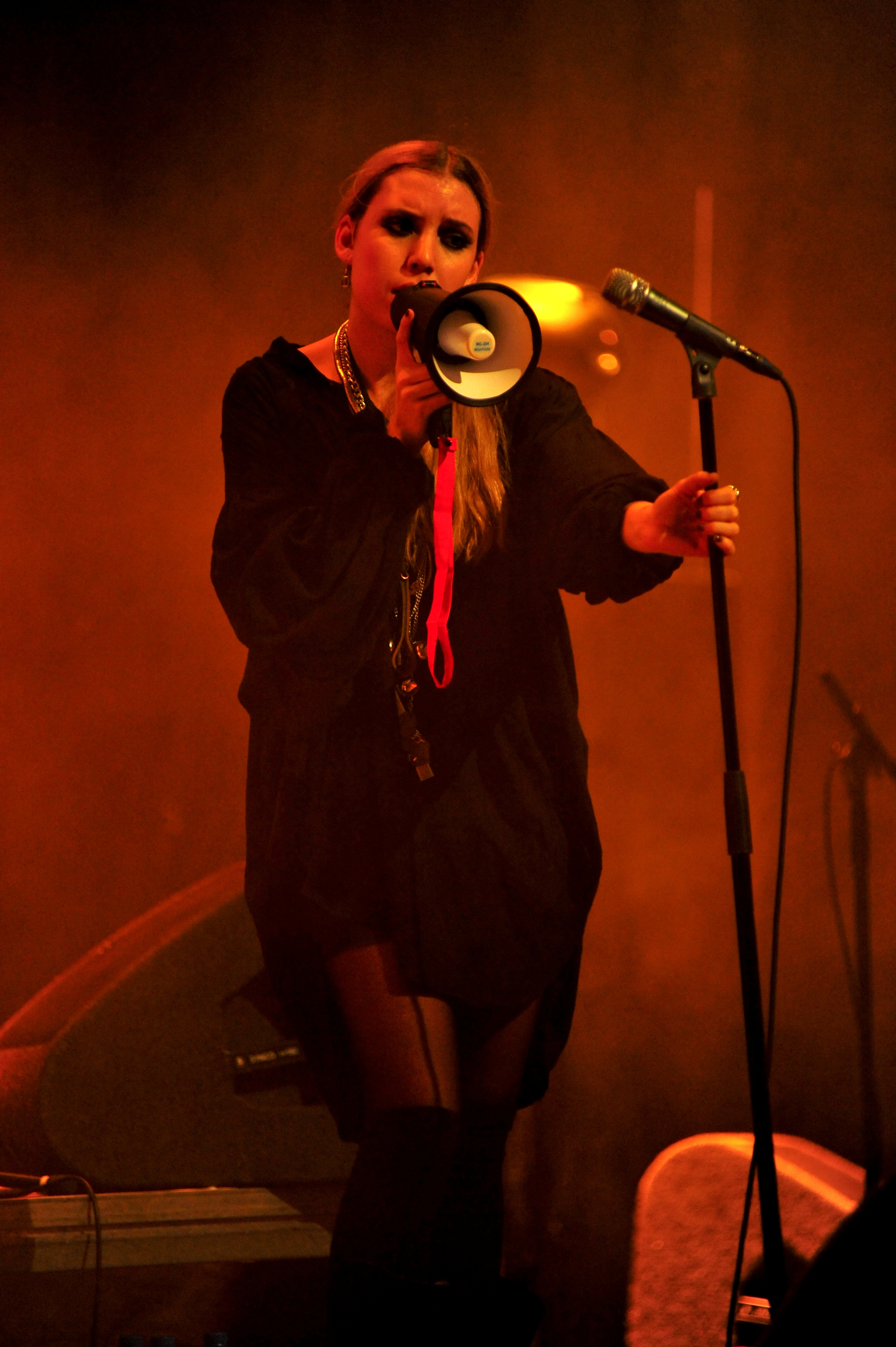
Lykke Li performing at Paradiso in Amsterdam, December 2008

Lykke Li's song "Melodies and Desires" was featured in the 2010 Australian film Griff the Invisible and an edited version of "Get Some" was featured in the Catwoman trailer for the video game, Batman: Arkham City. She collaborated with singer Kleerup on the song "Until We Bleed", which was featured on an episode of UK TV series Misfits and an episode of the television series Ringer.

Her second album Wounded Rhymes was released in 2011. The album was featured on several lists of 2011's best albums, including Q, Mojo, The Observer, The New York Times, The Huffington Post and Rolling Stone. The 19 April 2011 episode of Glee (titled "A Night of Neglect") featured student Tina singing a version of Lykke Li's "I Follow Rivers". On 30 April 2011, she performed on Later... with Jools Holland in the UK, playing "Get Some", "Sadness Is a Blessing" and "I Follow Rivers". Lykke Li played at the 2011 Latitude Festival, held between 14 and 18 July 2011 at Henham Park in Suffolk, England. She appeared with her band on US late night talk show The Tonight Show with Jay Leno in August 2011 and on the Late Show with David Letterman in November 2011.

Belgian DJ/producer The Magician's remix of "I Follow Rivers" is featured in Jacques Audiard's 2012 film Rust and Bone and the 2013 Palme d'Or-winning Blue Is the Warmest Colour. Lykke contributed to the 2012 compilation "Volym 1" with the track "Come Near" released by the Swedish artist collective and record label INGRID where she is a founding member. She also contributed a cover of "Silver Springs" to a 2012 Fleetwood Mac tribute album, which included renditions from Best Coast, Marianne Faithfull, and MGMT.

In 2013, she was featured as a guest musician on David Lynch's third studio album, The Big Dream, performing vocals on the lead single, "I'm Waiting Here".

=== 2014–2017: I Never Learn, acting debut and Liv ===
On 27 February 2014, Lykke Li released the video for the title track of her third studio album, I Never Learn. Following the release, Lykke Li released the video for the single "Love Me Like I'm Not Made of Stone" on 4 March 2014. On 10 April 2014, she released a video for the lead single, "No Rest for the Wicked". On 15 July 2014, she also released a video for the single "Gunshot".

Lykke Li officially released I Never Learn on 2 May 2014. Once again her album was featured on several lists of 2014's best albums, including Billboard, Complex, and Pitchfork, among others. In United States, I Never Learn debuted at number 29 on the Billboard 200, making it Lykke Li's highest-peaking album on the chart. Prior to the release, Lykke Li released a remix of "No Rest for the Wicked", featuring ASAP Rocky, on 21 April 2014. On 30 May 2014, Lykke Li released a remix EP of "No Rest for the Wicked". German electronic DJ Robin Schulz remixed "No Rest for the Wicked" and the edit was featured in Schulz's debut album Prayer.

Lykke Li made her acting debut in the 2014 Swedish crime film Tommy, directed by Tarik Saleh, and recorded a song for the film, "Du är den ende". She wrote "No One Ever Loved" for the soundtrack to The Fault in Our Stars, which was released on 19 May 2014. Lykke Li was also featured as a guest musician on U2's album Songs of Innocence, performing vocals on the last track "The Troubles".

On 14 November 2014, Lykke Li gained considerable attention from Internet music publications regarding her cover of Drake's "Hold On, We're Going Home", performed the night prior at London's Eventim Apollo. On 5 January 2015, Lykke Li posted a picture on her Instagram account, in which she announced her temporary retirement.

In 2015, Lykke Li was featured on Emile Haynie's debut album We Fall on the track "Come Find Me", which also features Romy Madley Croft from the xx. She also teamed up with Woodkid to create a song for the Divergent Series: Insurgent – Original Motion Picture Soundtrack. The song, "Never Let You Down", was released as a single on 9 March 2015.

On 6 April 2015, she released a video for "Never Gonna Love Again", directed by Philippe Tempelman. In September 2016, supergroup Liv, featuring Lykke Li, released their first single "Wings of Love". The music video was directed by Lykke Li.

=== 2018–2019: So Sad So Sexy ===
Lykke Li released her fourth studio album, So Sad So Sexy, on 8 June 2018 through RCA. Along with the announcement, Lykke Li released the first two singles, "Deep End" and "Hard Rain".

In April 2019, she sang lead vocals and appeared in the video for Mark Ronson's "Late Night Feelings", the title track from the album of the same name.

In July 2019, Lykke Li released the EP Still Sad Still Sexy, featuring four remixes from So Sad So Sexy and two new songs.

=== 2020–2022: Eyeye ===
In a 2019 interview speaking about her fifth studio album, Lykke Li told NME: "I think, maybe to everyone's disappointment, I'm going to really scale it down and back and slow it down. [...] It'll be more like soul music. It'll still be sad, and still be sexy."

Lykke Li made her return to music releasing "BRON", a song sung entirely in Swedish, in October 2020.

Lykke Li released "No Hotel", the lead single from her fifth studio album, Eyeye, on 23 March 2022. The album was released on 20 May 2022.

In July 2022, it was announced that Lykke Li would partner with creative director Theo Lindquist and artist Nick Verstandpresent to present an immersive installation, entitled Ü & EYEYE, at Los Angeles' The Broad Museum. The project intends "to transform the Broad’s Oculus Hall into a hyper-sensory cathedral of female romantic fantasy", says a statement released about the installation. The opening night will feature a special performance by Lykke Li and her band in the Broad's lobby and third floor galleries.

=== 2023–present: The Afterparty ===
In March 2024, Lykke Li performed the June Carter Cash song "Ring of Fire" during the end credits of the Netflix film Damsel.

Lykke Li began work on her next album, The Afterparty, following the release of her 2022 album Eyeye and a 2025 covers EP. She released the album's lead single "Lucky Again" in February 2026. The album was released on Neon Gold Records on May 8, 2026.

== Other ventures ==
In September 2010, Lykke Li was announced as the official face of the Levi's Curve ID Collection, alongside Pixie Geldof and Miss Nine. In January 2012 she signed with the VIVA Model Management agency. She has Partnered with many major fashion brands, most recently including Levi's, H&M, Seven for All Mankind, and Nina Ricci.

Lykke Li made her acting debut in the 2014 Swedish crime film Tommy directed by Tarik Saleh. The film was released in cinemas in Scandinavia in March 2014. Lykke Li also appeared in Terrence Malick's 2017 film Song to Song, playing BV's (Ryan Gosling) girlfriend. She is a member of SAG/AFTRA.

The song "Gunshot" was used in the television commercial for the Peugeot 108, which stars Li. She also stars in a short film for Gucci's Spring/Summer 2015 collection, which features the song "Just Like a Dream" and debuted on 2 March 2015.

Lykke Li is a founding partner in Yola Mezcal, which hosted a festival in Los Angeles in 2019 featuring a lineup of all-female performances by Megan Thee Stallion, Courtney Love, and others.

== Artistry ==
Lykke Li has cited Neil Young, the Shangri-Las, This Mortal Coil, the Beatles, and the Rolling Stones as influences, stating, "They aren't pop anymore by today's standards, but they were." Other influences include the Velvet Underground, Leonard Cohen, and Beach House.

Lykke Li possesses the vocal range of a soprano.

== Personal life ==
Of her practice of transcendental meditation, Lykke Li said in 2014: "It's really interesting from a creative point of view. Before, I could only write a few sentences and I'd have to take a break for a few days before I could go back to it. All of a sudden, I could write and finish a song in one go – verse, verse, verse, chorus, the lot. And that would happen with song after song. Finally, I unlocked the gate."

On 30 October 2015, Lykke Li posted a photo on Instagram announcing her pregnancy. On 12 February 2016, on Facebook, she announced the birth of her son, Dion. His father is musician Jeff Bhasker. Lykke Li's mother died three weeks after Dion was born; she says that her album So Sad So Sexy was born out of this difficult time in her life.

Her second child was born in August 2023.

== Discography ==
- Youth Novels (2008)
- Wounded Rhymes (2011)
- I Never Learn (2014)
- So Sad So Sexy (2018)
- Eyeye (2022)
- The Afterparty (2026)

== Filmography ==
- Tommy (2014)
- Song to Song (2017)

== Awards and nominations ==
Award	Year	Nominee(s)	Category	Result	Ref.
Antville Music Video Awards	2008	"I'm Good, I'm Gone"	Best Performance Video	Nominated	
Antville Music Video Awards	2008	"I'm Good, I'm Gone"	Best Choreography	Nominated	
Antville Music Video Awards	2008	"I'm Good, I'm Gone"	Best Art Direction	Nominated	
Antville Music Video Awards	2011	"Sadness Is a Blessing"	Best Narrative	Won	
Antville Music Video Awards	2011	"Sadness Is a Blessing"	Best Cinematography	Nominated	
BT Digital Music Awards	2011	Wounded Rhymes Google Earth Moon gig	Best Artist Promotion	Nominated	
Camerimage	2018	"Hard Rain"	Best Music Video	Nominated	
Camerimage	2022	"5D"	Best Music Video	Nominated	
ECHO Awards	2012	"I Follow Rivers"	Hit of the Year	Nominated	
European Border Breakers Awards	2009	Youth Novels	Album of the Year	Won	
European Festivals Awards	2012	"I Follow Rivers"	Festival Anthem of the Year	Won	
GAFFA Awards (Denmark)	2019	Herself	Best International Artist	Nominated	
GAFFA Awards (Denmark)	2019	So Sad So Sexy	Best International Album	Nominated	
GAFFA Awards (Sweden)	2019	Herself	Best Solo Artist	Nominated	
GAFFA Awards (Sweden)	2019	"Deep End"	Best Hit	Nominated	
GAFFA Awards (Sweden)	2019	So Sad So Sexy	Best Album	Nominated	
Grammis	2009	Herself	Best Newcomer	Nominated	
Grammis	2012	Herself	Best Pop	Nominated	
Grammis	2012	Herself	Best Composer	Nominated	
Grammis	2012	Herself	Best International Success	Nominated	
Grammis	2012	Herself	Best Artist	Won	
Grammis	2012	Wounded Rhymes	Best Album	Won	
Grammis	2015	Herself	Best Pop	Nominated	
Grammis	2019	Herself	Best Alternative Pop	Nominated	
Grammis	2019	Herself	Best Composer	Nominated	
Grammis	2019	So Sad So Sexy	Best Album	Nominated	
mtvU Woodie Awards	2008	Herself	The Breaking Woodie	Nominated	
Meteor Music Awards	2009	Herself	Best International Female	Nominated	
m-v-f- Awards	2023	Eyeye	Innovation in a Video	Nominated	
NME Awards	2009	Herself	Hottest Female	Nominated	
Nordic Music Prize	2011	Wounded Rhymes	Album of the Year	Nominated	
Nordic Music Prize	2014	I Never Learn	Album of the Year	Nominated	
P3 Guld Music Awards	2009	Herself	Best New Artist	Won	
P3 Guld Music Awards	2009	Herself	Best Pop	Nominated	
P3 Guld Music Awards	2015	Herself	Best Pop	Nominated	
Rober Awards Music Prize	2008	Herself	Best European Artist	Nominated	
Rober Awards Music Prize	2008	Herself	Best Female Artist	Nominated	
Rober Awards Music Prize	2011	Herself	Best Female Artist	Nominated	
Rober Awards Music Prize	2014	Herself	Best Female Artist	Nominated	
Rober Awards Music Prize	2014	Herself	Best Pop Artist	Nominated	
Rober Awards Music Prize	2014	"Du är den ende"	Best Cover Version	Nominated	
STIM	2011	Herself	Platinagitarren	Won	
Studio8 Media International Music Awards	2009	Herself	Female Voice of February 2009	Won	
UK Music Video Awards	2019	"Late Night Feelings" (feat. Mark Ronson)	Best Styling in a Video	Nominated	
UK Music Video Awards	2022	Eyeye	Best Special Video Project	Nominated	
World Music Awards	2014	Herself	World's Best Female Artist	Nominated	
World Music Awards	2014	Herself	World's Best Live Act	Nominated	
World Music Awards	2014	Herself	World's Best Entertainer of the Year	Nominated	
World Music Awards	2014	"I Follow Rivers"	World's Best Song	Nominated	
