= List of number-one popular hits of 2012 (Brazil) =

This is a list of number one singles on the Billboard Brasil Hot Popular Songs 100 chart in 2012. Note that Billboard publishes a monthly chart.

== Chart history ==
Issue date	Song	Artist(s)	Reference
January 7	"Nega"	Luan Santana	
January 14	"Ai Se Eu Te Pego"	Michel Teló	
January 21	"Ai Se Eu Te Pego"	Michel Teló	
January 28	"Humilde Residência"	Michel Teló	
February 4	"Buque de Flores"	Thiaguinho	
February 11	"Nega"	Luan Santana	
February 18	"Nega"	Luan Santana	
February 25	"Nega"	Luan Santana	
March 3	"Humilde Residência"	Michel Telo	
March 10	"Nega"	Luan Santana	
March 17	"Humilde Residência"	Michel Telo	
March 24	"Humilde Residência"	Michel Telo	
March 31	"Humilde Residência"	Michel Telo	
April 7	"Humilde Residência"	Michel Telo	
April 14	"Humilde Residência"	Michel Telo	
April 21	"Humilde Residência"	Michel Telo	
April 28	"Humilde Residência"	Michel Telo	
May 5	"Humilde Residência"	Michel Telo	
May 12	"Humilde Residência"	Michel Telo	
May 19	"Eu Quero Tchu Eu Quero Tcha"	João Lucas & Marcelo	
May 26	"Eu Quero Tchu Eu Quero Tcha"	João Lucas & Marcelo	
June	"Humilde Residência"	Michel Teló	
July	"Sou o Cara pra Você"	Thiaguinho	
August	"Te Vivo"	Luan Santana	
September	"Te Vivo"	Luan Santana	
October	"Te Vivo"	Luan Santana	
November	"Te Vivo"	Luan Santana	
December	"Esse Cara Sou Eu"	Roberto Carlos	

== See also ==
- Billboard Brasil
- List of number-one pop hits of 2011 (Brazil)
- Crowley Broadcast Analysis
