= List of Hot 100 number-one singles of 2011 (Brazil) =

This is a list of number one singles on the Billboard Brasil Hot 100 chart in 2011. Note that Billboard publishes a monthly chart.

== Chart history ==
Issue date	Song	Artist(s)	Reference
January 1	"Adrenalina"	Luan Santana	
January 8	"Adrenalina"	Luan Santana	
January 15	"Adrenalina"	Luan Santana	
January 22	"Adrenalina"	Luan Santana	
January 29	"Acelera Aê"	Ivete Sangalo	
February 5	"Química do Amor"	Luan Santana featurting Ivete Sangalo	
February 12	"Química do Amor"	Luan Santana featurting Ivete Sangalo	
February 19	"Química do Amor"	Luan Santana featurting Ivete Sangalo	
February 26	"Química do Amor"	Luan Santana featurting Ivete Sangalo	
March 5	"Química do Amor"	Luan Santana featurting Ivete Sangalo	
March 12	"Química do Amor"	Luan Santana featurting Ivete Sangalo	
March 19	"Química do Amor"	Luan Santana featurting Ivete Sangalo	
March 26	"Química do Amor"	Luan Santana featurting Ivete Sangalo	
April 2	"Um Beijo"	Luan Santana	
April 9	"Um Beijo"	Luan Santana	
April 16	"Um Beijo"	Luan Santana	
April 23	"Um Beijo"	Luan Santana	
April 30	"Um Beijo"	Luan Santana	
May 7	"Amar Não é Pecado"	Luan Santana	
May 14	"Amar Não é Pecado"	Luan Santana	
May 21	"Amar Não é Pecado"	Luan Santana	
May 28	"Amar Não é Pecado"	Luan Santana	
June 4	"Amar Não é Pecado"	Luan Santana	
June 11	"Amar Não é Pecado"	Luan Santana	
June 18	"Amar Não é Pecado"	Luan Santana	
June 25	"Amar Não é Pecado"	Luan Santana	
July 2	"Amar Não é Pecado"	Luan Santana	
July 9	"Amar Não é Pecado"	Luan Santana	
July 16	"Amar Não é Pecado"	Luan Santana	
July 23	"Amar Não é Pecado"	Luan Santana	
July 30	"Talking to the Moon"	Bruno Mars	
August 6	"Talking to the Moon"	Bruno Mars	
August 13	"Talking to the Moon"	Bruno Mars	
August 20	"Talking to the Moon"	Bruno Mars	
August 27	"Talking to the Moon"	Bruno Mars	
September 3	"Talking to the Moon"	Bruno Mars	
September 10	"Talking to the Moon"	Bruno Mars	
September 17	"Talking to the Moon"	Bruno Mars	
September 24	"Talking to the Moon"	Bruno Mars	
October 1	"As Lembranças Vão Na Mala"	Luan Santana	
October 8	"As Lembranças Vão Na Mala"	Luan Santana	
October 15	"As Lembranças Vão Na Mala"	Luan Santana	
October 22	"As Lembranças Vão Na Mala"	Luan Santana	
October 29	"Ai Se Eu Te Pego"	Michel Teló	
November 5	"Ai Se Eu Te Pego"	Michel Teló	
November 12	"Ai Se Eu Te Pego"	Michel Teló	
November 19	"Ai Se Eu Te Pego"	Michel Teló	
November 26	"Ai Se Eu Te Pego"	Michel Teló	
December 3	"Nega"	Luan Santana	
December 10	"We Found Love"	Rihanna featuring Calvin Harris	
December 17	"We Found Love"	Rihanna featuring Calvin Harris	
December 24	"We Found Love"	Rihanna featuring Calvin Harris	
December 31	"We Found Love"	Rihanna featuring Calvin Harris	

== See also ==
- Billboard Brasil
- List of number-one pop hits of 2011 (Brazil)
- Crowley Broadcast Analysis
