= List of Brazilian entries on the Billboard Hot 100 =

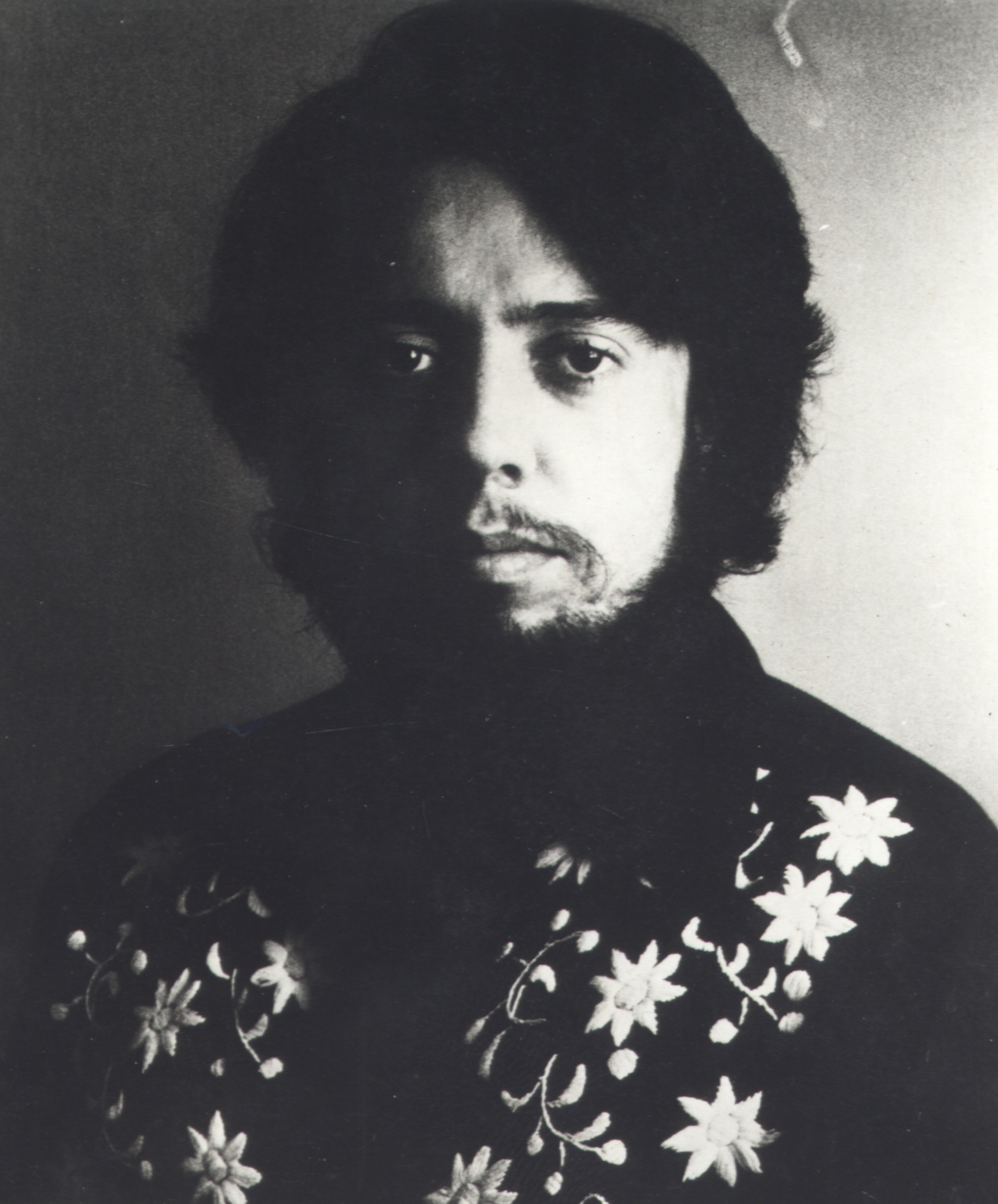
Sérgio Mendes (pictured) is the Brazilian artist with the most entries on the Billboard Hot 100.

This list contains all Brazilian entries on the Billboard Hot 100 chart. The chart, compiled and published by Billboard magazine, tracks the most listened-to songs each week in the United States and is a measure of popularity. It gathers data from streams on various platforms, around 1,000 radio stations in the country, as well as digital and physical sales.

The first time a Brazilian artist appeared on the chart was in 1963, with duo Los Indios Tabajaras and their instrumental version of the song "Maria Elena". However, musician Sérgio Mendes is the Brazilian artist with the most entries on the chart, with 14 songs throughout his career. As of 2026, Los Indios Tabajaras, Mendes, Eumir Deodato, Morris Albert and Anitta are the only Brazilian artists with multiple entries on the chart.

== List ==
#	Song	Brazilian artist	Peak position	Peak date	Weeks on chart	Ref.
1	"Maria Elena"	Los Indios Tabajaras	6th	November 16, 1963	14	
2	"Always in My Heart"	Los Indios Tabajaras	82nd	March 21, 1964	2	
3	"The Girl from Ipanema"	Astrud Gilberto	5th	July 18, 1964	12	
4	"Mas que nada"	Sérgio Mendes	47th	October 29, 1966	8	
5	"Constant Rain (Chove Chuva)"	Sérgio Mendes	71st	January 28, 1967	6	
6	"For Me"	Sérgio Mendes	98th	April 1, 1967	2	
7	"Night and Day"	Sérgio Mendes	82nd	July 1, 1967	5	
8	"The Look of Love"	Sérgio Mendes	4th	July 6, 1968	14	
9	"The Fool on the Hill"	Sérgio Mendes	6th	September 28, 1968	12	
10	"Scarborough Fair"	Sérgio Mendes	16th	December 14, 1968	9	
11	"Pretty World"	Sérgio Mendes	62nd	May 31, 1969	6	
12	"(Sittin' On) The Dock of the Bay"	Sérgio Mendes	66th	July 19, 1969	5	
13	"Wichita Lineman"	Sérgio Mendes	95th	December 6, 1969	2	
14	"Also Sprach Zarathustra (2001)"	Eumir Deodato	2nd	March 31, 1973	12	
15	"Rhapsody in Blue"	Eumir Deodato	41st	September 29, 1973	8	
16	"Feelings"	Morris Albert	6th	October 25, 1975	32	
17	"Sweet Loving Man"	Morris Albert	93rd	February 7, 1976	2	
18	"Peter Gunn"	Eumir Deodato	84th	November 27, 1976	6	
19	"Happy Hour"	Eumir Deodato	70th	July 3, 1982	5	
20	"Never Gonna Let You Go"	Sérgio Mendes	4th	July 9, 1983	23	
21	"Rainbow's End"	Sérgio Mendes	53rd	September 10, 1983	8	
22	"Olympia"	Sérgio Mendes	58th	April 28, 1984	7	
23	"Alibis"	Sérgio Mendes	29th	August 11, 1984	19	
24	"Lambada"	Kaoma	46th	April 7, 1990	12	
25	"Music Is My Hot Hot Sex"	CSS	63rd	December 1, 2007	3	
26	"Ai Se Eu Te Pego"	Michel Teló	81st	May 12, 2012	12	
27	"We Are One (Ole Ola)"	Claudia Leitte	59th	June 28, 2014	6	
28	"Corazón"	Nego do Borel	87th	January 27, 2018	9	
29	"Me Gusta"	Anitta	91st	October 3, 2020	1	
30	"Envolver"	Anitta	70th	April 16, 2022	6	
31	"Bellakeo"	Anitta	53rd	February 3, 2024	14	
32	"Alibi"	Pabllo Vittar	95th	August 3, 2024	4	
33	"São Paulo"	Anitta	43rd	February 15, 2025	3	

== Ranking by entries ==
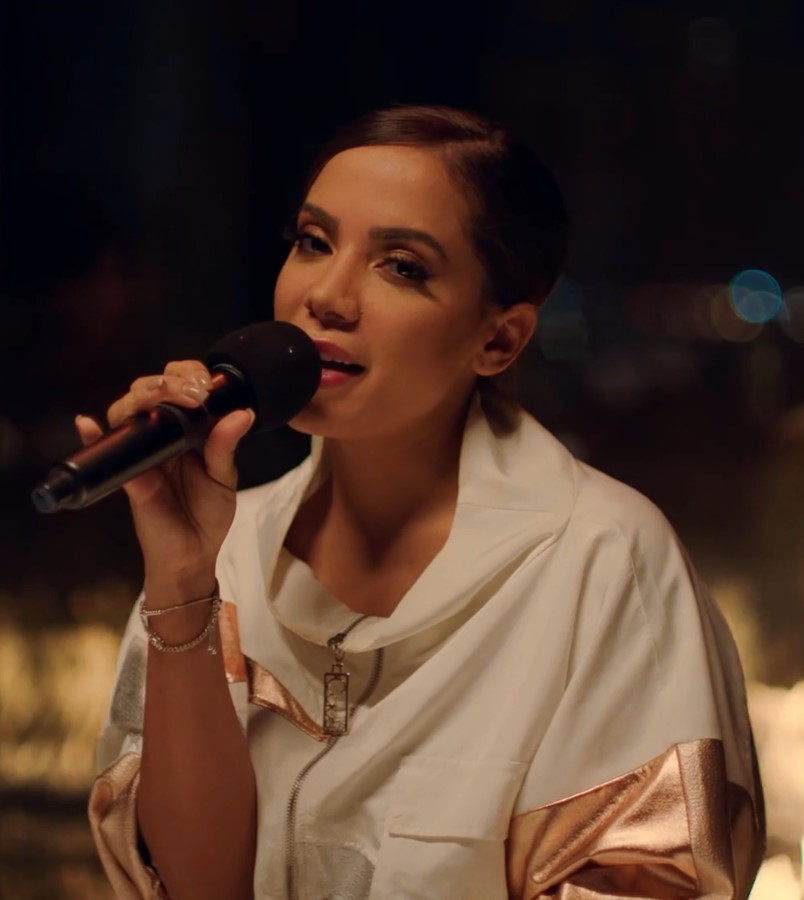
Anitta (pictured) is the Brazilian female singer with the most entries on the Billboard Hot 100, and she has also become the Brazilian artist with the highest peak on the Hot 100 in the 21st century.

List of Brazilian artists with the most entries on the Billboard Hot 100
Position	Artist	Total entries
1	Sérgio Mendes	14
2–3	Anitta	4
2–3	Eumir Deodato	4
4–5	Los Indios Tabajaras	2
4–5	Morris Albert	2
6–12	Astrud Gilberto	1
6–12	Claudia Leitte	1
6–12	CSS	1
6–12	Kaoma	1
6–12	Michel Teló	1
6–12	Nego do Borel	1
6–12	Pabllo Vittar	1

== Ranking by weeks ==
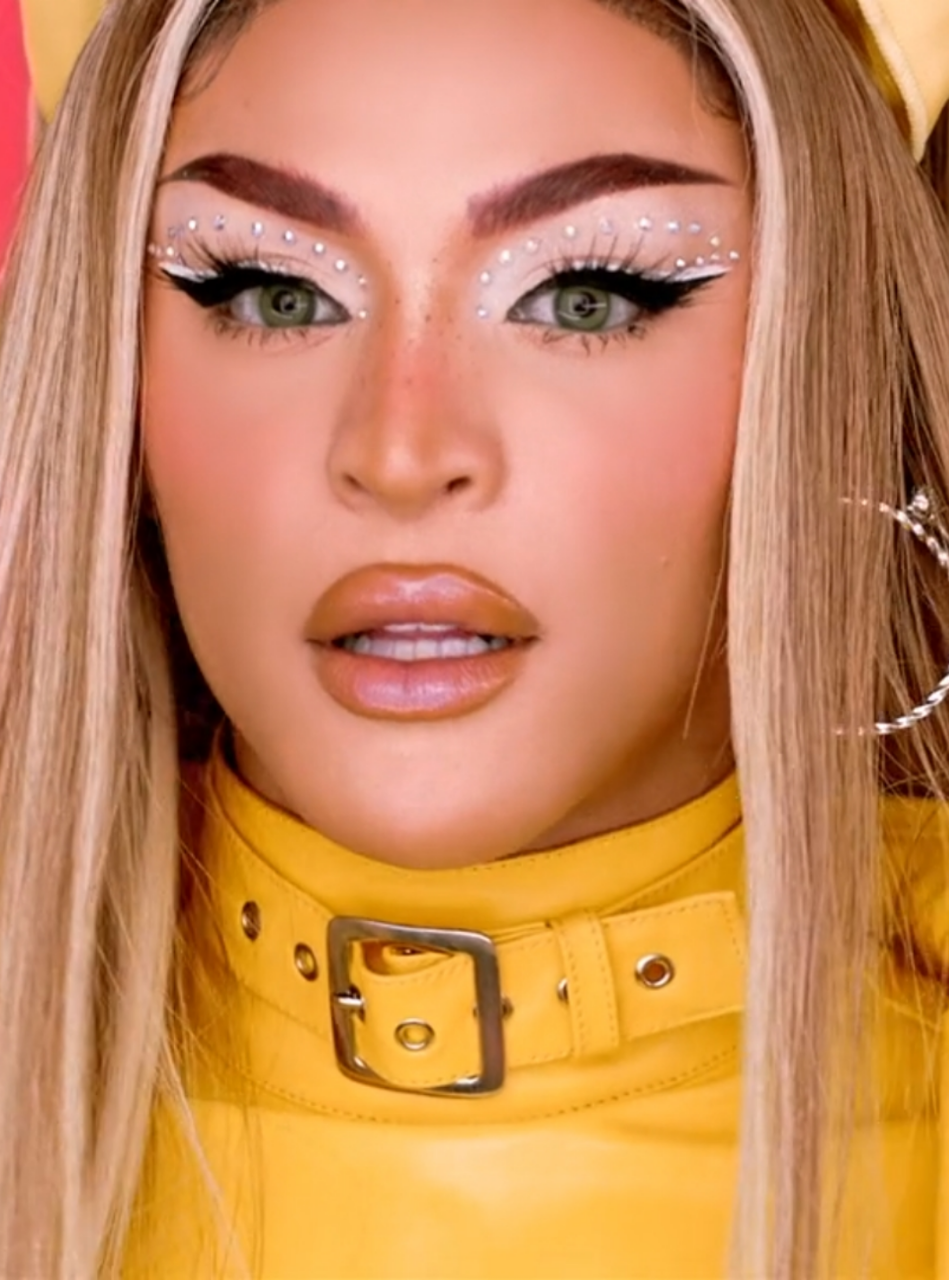
Singer Pabllo Vittar (pictured) is the first Brazilian drag queen ever to chart on the Billboard Hot 100, and the second overall to do so after American drag star RuPaul.

List of Brazilian artists with the most weeks on the Billboard Hot 100
Position	Artist	Total weeks
1	Sérgio Mendes	126
2	Morris Albert	34
3	Eumir Deodato	31
4	Anitta	24
5	Los Indios Tabajaras	16
6–8	Astrud Gilberto	12
6–8	Kaoma	12
6–8	Michel Teló	12
9	Nego do Borel	9
10	Claudia Leitte	6
11	Pabllo Vittar	4
12	CSS	3
