= Neide =

Neide or variant, may refer to:

== People ==
- Neide Van-Dúnem (a.k.a. Neide, born 1986) female Angolan singer
- Neide Barbosa (born 1980) female Angolan handball player
- Neide Dias (born 1987) female Angolan runner
- Neide Sá (born 1940) female Brazilian artist
- Neide, a German surname
- Néide mac Onchú (circa 800) male Irish lord

Fictional characters

- Neide Aparecida, a fictional character from the Brazilian sitcom Sai de Baixo

== Other uses ==
- Neides, compounds of neon
- Neide (2010 song), a song off the album Ai se eu te pego! by Brazilian band Cangaia de Jegue

== See also ==
- Neides, the stilt bugs
- Niedysz (a.k.a. Neides), Poland; a village
- Rana Neide, a Sami goddess of spring and fertiity
