= Wounded Rhymes =

- Standard cover

Studio album by Lykke Li
- Released: 25 February 2011
- Recorded: 2010
- Studios: Atlantis, Decibel and Högalid (Stockholm, Sweden)
- Genres: Indie pop; electropop
- Length: 40:56
- Labels: LL; Atlantic
- Producer: Björn Yttling

Lykke Li chronology
Youth Novels (2008)	Wounded Rhymes (2011)	I Never Learn (2014)

Singles from Wounded Rhymes
- 1. "Get Some" Released: 22 October 2010; 2. "I Follow Rivers" Released: 21 January 2011; 3. "Sadness Is a Blessing" Released: 13 May 2011; 4. "Youth Knows No Pain" Released: 23 September 2011

Wounded Rhymes is the second studio album by Swedish singer and songwriter Lykke Li. It was released on 25 February 2011 by LL Recordings and Atlantic Records. Written in Los Angeles and recorded in Stockholm, the album was produced by Björn Yttling of Peter Bjorn and John, who also handled production for Li's debut album, Youth Novels (2008).

Upon its release, Wounded Rhymes received acclaim from music critics, who viewed it as an improvement from its predecessor. It produced four singles, including "I Follow Rivers", which charted inside the top five in several European countries.

== Background and writing ==
Li spent six months writing the album in the Echo Park neighbourhood of Los Angeles, while visiting the desert, rewatching Alejandro Jodorowsky's 1973 film The Holy Mountain and listening to Alan Lomax field recordings, eventually coming up with songs she calls "hypnotic, psychotic and more primal". In an interview with Pitchfork on 18 November 2010, when asked if lead single "Get Some" was an indicative of the rest of the album, Li responded:

"It's just a snapshot, but the album is darker, moodier, and the lyrics are heavier. There's less atmosphere, more directness. I was 19 when I recorded my first album, and I've been exposed to many things during these last few years; all the baby fat is gone. I dove into the craziness and did things that maybe I would think twice about when I get older. And I'm a really restless person; I'm tired of the way I sounded or looked yesterday. So it's hard to hang onto this image of me as this young Swedish female in this world. People comment on how you look, it's so unnecessary. I just wanted people to listen to what I have to say instead of focusing on anything else. And, of course, there are a lot of things I'm angry about in the world."

During the same interview, she also explained her decision to write the album in Los Angeles:

"I'm from Sweden so I don't enjoy winter at all; there's nothing cute about it. Right now I'm in Stockholm, and it's so fucking cold and dark. I have such a dark mood in myself already so I don't need things to be darker.

I was totally romanticizing the idea of Los Angeles when the Doors, Joni Mitchell, and Neil Young were hanging out there. I was trying to find David Lynch and Leonard Cohen with no luck. It was just more of a retreat. And Los Angeles is such a mysterious place because there's so much evil in that city, but there's also so much light. You can be totally alone on a hillside and I love that kind of secluded, deserted rawness."

Li unveiled the album's artwork and track listing on her official website on 14 December 2010.

== Promotion ==
Li premiered songs from the album during live performances across Europe in late 2010. She performed at Heimathafen Neukölln in Berlin on 1 November 2010, at La Maroquinerie in Paris on 2 November, at Heaven in London on 4 November, at Kägelbanan in Stockholm on 8 November, and at Klub Wytwórnia in Łódź, Poland, on 20 November. Additionally, she performed at Le Poisson Rouge in New York City on 1 December 2010.

Li performed "Get Some" on Late Night with Jimmy Fallon on 3 March 2011, on Conan on 10 March and on Last Call with Carson Daly on 15 March. Li also toured Europe and North America in promotion of the album, starting at El Rey Theatre at Los Angeles on 9 March 2011.

== Singles ==
"Get Some" was released on 22 October 2010 as the lead single from Wounded Rhymes. Follow-up single "I Follow Rivers" premiered exclusively on Spin magazine's website on 10 January 2011, and was released digitally on 21 January 2011. The single reached number 44 in Li's native Sweden, while becoming a commercial success in several other European countries, reaching number one in Belgium, Germany, and Italy, as well as the top five in Austria, France, Ireland, the Netherlands, and Switzerland.

"Sadness Is a Blessing" was released as the album's third single on 13 May 2011, followed by "Youth Knows No Pain" on 23 September 2011.

== Critical reception ==
Professional ratings
Aggregate scores
Source	Rating
AnyDecentMusic?	8.0/10
Metacritic	83/100
Review scores
Source	Rating
AllMusic	4/5 stars
The A.V. Club	B+
Entertainment Weekly	A
The Guardian	4/5 stars
Los Angeles Times	3.5/4 stars
MSN Music (Expert Witness)	A−
NME	7/10
Pitchfork	8.3/10
Rolling Stone	4/5 stars
Spin	8/10

Wounded Rhymes received widespread acclaim from music critics. At Metacritic, which assigns a normalised rating out of 100 to reviews from mainstream publications, the album received an average score of 83, based on 34 reviews, which indicates "universal acclaim". Corey Beasley of PopMatters described it as "a dark record, borne of lost love and youthful frustrations, more suited in tone to the frozen lake country than the haze of sunny SoCal. It means this is a seriously heavy and seriously excellent album." K. Ross Hoffman of AllMusic wrote that Li "hasn't entirely let go of her girlish sweetness, and she certainly hasn't lost her way with a melodic hook, but she's largely outgrown the more cloyingly precious, occasionally clumsy tendencies that sometimes plagued her debut, and her singing voice, while still appealingly personable and distinctive, has gotten considerably more forceful", while praising the album as "an inspired, rugged, smart, emotive, coolly modern piece of indie pop, and an improvement on Lykke Li's debut in just about every respect."

Rolling Stone critic Jody Rosen dubbed the album "a weird-pop gem" containing "torchy love songs that nod to Sixties hits but are stretched into all kinds of shapes." The Observer's Hermione Hoby lauded it as "a formidable collection of all-woman 21st-century torch songs that reverberate with vengeance and desolation. The arrangements are still stark and driven by syncopated handclaps and off-kilter drums, but now, voice creaking with heartache, she sounds like she's casting dark spells rather than serenading daydreams." Kevin Liedel of Slant Magazine expressed that the album "is not so much a stylistic departure as it is a stark transformation of mood: Though still an expert dabbler in gravelly electro-pop, Li sounds positively dangerous now, her voice tormented, biting, and weapon-like, and her accompaniments following suit." Sean Fennessey of Spin stated that the album is "equal parts seething ice princess and lonely snowwoman, vacillating almost track by track between fury and despondence over a scotched relationship", adding that "[t]he dual objectives—weep for me, fear me—collide throughout, creating a dicey, but gripping album."

In a review for Pitchfork, Stephen M. Deusner viewed Wounded Rhymes as "an album of stark, scintillating contrasts: between fantasy and reality, between the powerful and the vulnerable, between the brash and the quiet, between the rhythmic and the melodic." Amanda Petrusich of Entertainment Weekly commented, "While her 2008 breakout, Youth Novels, was quirky and coy, Wounded Rhymes is hungry, dark, dirty." Jazz Monroe of NME concluded that "for all its wailing codas, swollen strings and silky production, Wounded Rhymes, while a bold statement, doesn't quite strike the same lugubrious groove. But while we bemoan flash-in-the-pan pop stars, it's encouraging to see someone like Lykke sparking attention." August Brown of the Los Angeles Times felt that the album is "full of charged contradictions. She's a mediocre singer with a very interesting voice, a fan of classic handmade pop and the ways laptops can serrate it, and a writer obsessed with sex and with sexing up obsession."

== Commercial performance ==
As of January 2012, UK sales stand at 26,391 copies. As of 2014 it had sold 97,000 copies in United States.

=== Accolades ===
Publication	List	Rank
Clash	The Top 40 Albums of 2011	19
Clash	The Top 100 Albums of Clash's Lifetime	79
DIY	Albums of 2011	16
Drowned in Sound	Favourite Albums of 2011	35
Entertainment Weekly	10 Best Albums of 2011	3
The Guardian	The Best Albums of 2011	32
Mojo	Top 50 Albums of 2011	28
musicOMH	Top 50 Albums of 2011	34
The New York Times	Best Albums of 2011	8
Paste	The 50 Best Albums of 2011	28
Pitchfork	The Top 50 Albums of 2011	43
PopMatters	The 75 Best Albums of 2011	23
Q	Top 50 Albums of 2011	26
Slant Magazine	The 25 Best Albums of 2011	2
Spin	50 Best Albums of 2011	10
Under the Radar	Top 80 Albums of 2011	70
The Village Voice	Pazz & Jop 2011	38

== Track listing ==
All lyrics are written by Lykke Li.

No.	Title	Music	Length
1.	"Youth Knows No Pain"	Li; Björn Yttling; Rick Nowels	2:59
2.	"I Follow Rivers"	Li; Yttling; Nowels	3:48
3.	"Love Out of Lust"	Li; Yttling; Nowels	4:43
4.	"Unrequited Love"	Li; Yttling	3:11
5.	"Get Some"	Li; Yttling	3:22
6.	"Rich Kids Blues"	Li; Yttling	3:01
7.	"Sadness Is a Blessing"	Li; Yttling; Nowels	4:00
8.	"I Know Places"	Li; Yttling	6:06
9.	"Jerome"	Li; Yttling; Nowels	4:22
10.	"Silent My Song"	Li; Yttling	5:24
Total length:			40:56

Nordic iTunes Store bonus track
No.	Title	Music	Length
11.	"Made You Move"	Li; Yttling	2:46
Total length:			43:42

iTunes Store deluxe edition bonus tracks (except Nordic countries)
No.	Title	Music	Length
11.	"Made You Move"	Li; Yttling	2:46
12.	"Untitled" (video)		3:32
13.	"Get Some (With Knives)" (video)		3:25
14.	"The Only" (pre-order only)	Li; Yttling	3:50
Total length:			54:29

Japanese edition bonus tracks
No.	Title	Music	Length
11.	"Made You Move"	Li; Yttling	2:46
12.	"I Follow Rivers" (acoustic)	Li; Yttling; Nowels	3:20
13.	"Jerome" (acoustic)	Li; Yttling; Nowels	3:45
Total length:			50:47

10th Anniversary digital edition bonus tracks
No.	Title	Music	Length
11.	"Made You Move"	Li; Yttling	2:46
12.	"Youth Knows No Pain" (The Lost Sessions Full Version)	Li; Yttling; Nowels	6:16
13.	"Jerome" (The Lost Sessions)	Li; Yttling; Nowels	3:49
14.	"I Follow Rivers" (The Lost Sessions)	Li; Yttling; Nowels	3:22
15.	"I Follow Rivers" (The Magician Remix)	Li; Yttling; Nowels; Magician	4:39
16.	"I Follow Rivers" (Tyler, the Creator Remix)	Li; Yttling; Nowels; Tyler, the Creator	3:42
Total length:			1:05:30

Note

- The vinyl version of the 10th anniversary edition does not include the track "Made You Move".

== Personnel ==
Credits adapted from the liner notes of Wounded Rhymes.

=== Musicians ===
- Lykke Li – vocals (all tracks); percussion (track 2)
- Zhala Rifat – backing vocals (tracks 1–7, 9, 10)
- Mariam Wallentin – backing vocals (tracks 1–7, 9, 10)
- Björn Yttling – bass (tracks 1–3, 5–7, 9); organ (tracks 1–3, 7, 9, 10); percussion (tracks 1–3, 5, 7, 9); backing vocals (tracks 2, 6, 8, 10); piano (tracks 2, 5, 9, 10); guitars (tracks 2–4, 6–9)
- Rick Nowels – guitar (track 1); organ (tracks 3, 7); piano (track 7)
- Lars Skoglund – drums (tracks 1–3, 5–7, 9, 10); percussion (tracks 1, 7)
- John Eriksson – drums (tracks 1, 2, 5, 7); percussion (tracks 1, 2, 4–6, 9, 10)
- Dag Lundquist – percussion (tracks 1, 2, 7)
- Anders Stenberg – guitar (tracks 5, 6); backing vocals (tracks 6, 10)
- Micke Svensson – percussion (track 5); organ (track 6); guitar (track 10)
- Dean Reid – percussion (track 7)
- Lasse Mårtén – percussion (track 9)

=== Technical ===
- Björn Yttling – production, recording
- Lasse Mårtén – mixing, recording
- Janne Hansson – recording
- Hans Stenlund – recording
- Henrik Jonsson – mastering

=== Artwork ===
- Roger Deckker – photos
- Leif Podhajsky – artwork

== Charts ==
=== Weekly charts ===
Weekly chart performance for Wounded Rhymes
Chart (2011)	Peak position
Australian Albums (ARIA)	30
Austrian Albums (Ö3 Austria)	53
Belgian Albums (Ultratop Flanders)	53
Belgian Albums (Ultratop Wallonia)	94
Canadian Albums (Billboard)	19
Danish Albums (Hitlisten)	12
Dutch Albums (Album Top 100)	47
Finnish Albums (Suomen virallinen lista)	18
French Albums (SNEP)	73
German Albums (Offizielle Top 100)	44
Irish Albums (IRMA)	16
New Zealand Albums (RMNZ)	26
Norwegian Albums (VG-lista)	3
Scottish Albums (Official Charts)	55
Swedish Albums (Sverigetopplistan)	2
Swiss Albums (Schweizer Hitparade)	38
UK Albums (Official Charts)	37
US Billboard 200	36
US Top Alternative Albums (Billboard)	7
US Top Rock Albums (Billboard)	10

=== Year-end charts ===
Year-end chart performance for Wounded Rhymes
Chart (2011)	Position
Danish Albums (Hitlisten)	94
Swedish Albums (Sverigetopplistan)	32

== Certifications and sales ==
Certifications and sales for Wounded Rhymes
Region	Certification	Certified units/sales
Sweden (GLF)	Gold	20,000^{‡}
United Kingdom	—	26,391
United States	—	97,000
^{‡} Sales+streaming figures based on certification alone.

== Release history ==
Region	Date	Edition	Label	Ref.
Australia	25 February 2011	Standard	Warner	
Ireland	25 February 2011	Standard	LL; Atlantic	
Netherlands	25 February 2011	Standard	Warner	
France	28 February 2011	Standard	Warner	
United Kingdom	28 February 2011	Standard	LL; Atlantic	
Canada	1 March 2011	Standard	Warner	
United States	1 March 2011	Standard	Atlantic	
Sweden	2 March 2011	Standard	LL	
Germany	4 March 2011	Standard	Warner	
Italy	8 March 2011	Standard	Warner	
Japan	22 June 2011	Standard	Warner	
Netherlands	2 March 2012	Special	Warner	
France	9 April 2012	Special	Warner	
Germany	6 July 2012	Special	Warner	
Italy	14 February 2013	Special	Warner	
Various	16 July 2021	10th Anniversary (digital)	LL; Atlantic	
Various	15 October 2021	10th Anniversary (vinyl)	LL; Atlantic	
