= Esse Cara Sou Eu =

EP by Roberto Carlos
- Released: November 4, 2012
- Recorded: 2012
- Genre: MPB, funk melody
- Label: Sony Music, Amigo Records
- Producer: Guto Graça Mello, Dody Sirena

Roberto Carlos chronology
Roberto Carlos e Caetano Veloso e a Música de Tom Jobim (2008)	Esse Cara Sou Eu (2012)	Remixed (2013)

Singles from Esse Cara Sou Eu
- 1. "Esse Cara Sou Eu" Released: November 4, 2012; 2. "Furdúncio" Released: November 4, 2012

"Esse Cara Sou Eu" is an extended play (EP) released by Brazilian singer Roberto Carlos in 2012. The EP has sold over 1.7 million copies in Brazil.

Among the four present tracks, two are new: the title track, a romantic ballad, "Furdúncio", a funk melody written in partnership with Erasmo Carlos. Both tracks were included on the soundtrack of the Rede Globo's telenovela Salve Jorge in 2012.

The CD version includes the song "A Volta", re-recording an old success of Os Vips, composed by Roberto to the duo in 1966, which was included on the soundtrack of the Globo's telenovela América. The song "A Mulher Que Eu Amo" was featured in the telenovela Viver a Vida broadcast by the same station in 2009. The title track won the Latin Grammy Award for Best Brazilian Song and received a nomination for Song of the Year at the 14th awards ceremony in 2013.

In 2014, a Spanish-language version of the EP, Ese Tipo Soy Yo, was released targeting the Latin American market.

== Track listing ==
No.	Title	Writer(s)	Length
1.	"Esse Cara Sou Eu"	Roberto Carlos	4:32
2.	"Furdúncio"	R. Carlos, Erasmo Carlos	3:45
3.	"A Mulher Que Eu Amo"	R. Carlos	4:05
4.	"A Volta"	R. Carlos, E. Carlos	5:08

== Charts ==
Chart (2014)	Peak position
US Latin Pop Albums (Billboard)	13

== Certifications ==
Region	Certification	Sales/shipments
Brazil (ABPD)	3× Diamond	1,734,461*
* sales figures based on certification alone
