= List of number-one singles of 2012 (Spain) =

This lists the singles that reached number one on the Spanish Promusicae sales and airplay charts in 2012. Total sales correspond to the data sent by regular contributors to sales volumes and by digital distributors. There is a two-day difference between the reporting period from sales outlets and from radio stations. For example, the report period for the first full week of 2012 ended on January 8 for sales and on January 6 for airplay.

== Chart history ==
Week	Top-selling				Week	Most airplay			
Week	Issue date	Artist(s)	Song	Reference(s)	Week	Issue date	Artist(s)	Song	Reference(s)
1	January 8	Michel Teló	"Ai Se Eu Te Pego!"		1	January 6	Rihanna (feat. Calvin Harris)	"We Found Love"	
2	January 15	Michel Teló	"Ai Se Eu Te Pego!"		2	January 13	Maroon 5 (feat. Christina Aguilera)	"Moves Like Jagger"	
3	January 22	Michel Teló	"Ai Se Eu Te Pego!"		3	January 20	Maroon 5 (feat. Christina Aguilera)	"Moves Like Jagger"	
4	January 29	Michel Teló	"Ai Se Eu Te Pego!"		4	January 27	Maroon 5 (feat. Christina Aguilera)	"Moves Like Jagger"	
5	February 5	Michel Teló	"Ai Se Eu Te Pego!"		5	February 3	Maroon 5 (feat. Christina Aguilera)	"Moves Like Jagger"	
6	February 12	Michel Teló	"Ai Se Eu Te Pego!"		6	February 10	Maroon 5 (feat. Christina Aguilera)	"Moves Like Jagger"	
7	February 19	Michel Teló	"Ai Se Eu Te Pego!"		7	February 17	Maroon 5 (feat. Christina Aguilera)	"Moves Like Jagger"	
8	February 26	Michel Teló	"Ai Se Eu Te Pego!"		8	February 24	Adele	"Someone Like You"	
9	March 4	Michel Teló	"Ai Se Eu Te Pego!"		9	March 2	Adele	"Someone Like You"	
10	March 11	Michel Teló	"Ai Se Eu Te Pego!"		10	March 9	Adele	"Someone Like You"	
11	March 18	Cali y El Dandee	"Yo Te Esperaré"		11	March 16	Adele	"Someone Like You"	
12	March 25	Cali y El Dandee	"Yo Te Esperaré"		12	March 23	Adele	"Someone Like You"	
13	April 1	Cali y El Dandee	"Yo Te Esperaré"		13	March 30	Gym Class Heroes (feat. Adam Levine)	"Stereo Hearts"	
14	April 8	Cali y El Dandee	"Yo Te Esperaré"		14	April 6	Gym Class Heroes (feat. Adam Levine)	"Stereo Hearts"	
15	April 15	Cali y El Dandee	"Yo Te Esperaré"		15	April 13	Adele	"Someone Like You"	
16	April 22	Cali y El Dandee	"Yo Te Esperaré"		16	April 20	Gym Class Heroes (feat. Adam Levine)	"Stereo Hearts"	
17	April 29	Cali y El Dandee	"Yo Te Esperaré"		17	April 27	Gym Class Heroes (feat. Adam Levine)	"Stereo Hearts"	
18	May 6	Cali y El Dandee	"Yo Te Esperaré"		18	May 4	Juanes	"La Señal"	
19	May 13	Cali y El Dandee	"Yo Te Esperaré"		19	May 11	Estopa	"Me Quedaré"	
20	May 20	Cali y El Dandee	"Yo Te Esperaré"		20	May 18	Estopa	"Me Quedaré"	
21	May 27	Cali y El Dandee	"Yo Te Esperaré"		21	May 25	Pablo Alborán	"Te He Echado de Menos"	
22	June 3	Cali y El Dandee	"Yo Te Esperaré"		22	June 1	Pablo Alborán	"Te He Echado de Menos"	
23	June 10	Cali y El Dandee	"Yo Te Esperaré"		23	June 8	Pablo Alborán	"Te He Echado de Menos"	
24	June 17	Cali y El Dandee (feat. David Bisbal)	"No Hay 2 Sin 3 (Gol)"		24	June 15	Pablo Alborán	"Te He Echado de Menos"	
25	June 24	Cali y El Dandee	"Yo Te Esperaré"		25	June 22	Pablo Alborán	"Te He Echado de Menos"	
26	July 1	Alejandro Sanz	"No Me Compares"		26	June 29	Pablo Alborán	"Te He Echado de Menos"	
27	July 8	Cali & El Dandee (feat. David Bisbal)	"No Hay 2 Sin 3 (Gol)"		27	July 6	Pablo Alborán	"Te He Echado de Menos"	
28	July 15	Tacabro	"Tacatá"		28	July 13	Pablo Alborán	"Te He Echado de Menos"	
29	July 22	Tacabro	"Tacatá"		29	July 20	Maroon 5 (feat. Wiz Khalifa)	"Payphone"	
30	July 29	Tacabro	"Tacatá"		30	July 27	Pablo Alborán	"Te He Echado de Menos"	
31	August 5	Tacabro	"Tacatá"		31	August 3	Loreen	"Euphoria"	
32	August 12	Tacabro	"Tacatá"		32	August 10	Pablo Alborán	"Te He Echado de Menos"	
33	August 19	Tacabro	"Tacatá"		33	August 17	Pablo Alborán	"Te He Echado de Menos"	
34	August 26	Tacabro	"Tacatá"		34	August 24	Loreen	"Euphoria"	
35	September 2	Juan Magan (feat. Belinda)	"Te Voy A Esperar"		35	August 31	Loreen	"Euphoria"	
36	September 9	Juan Magan (feat. Belinda)	"Te Voy A Esperar"		36	September 7	Gotye (feat. Kimbra)	"Somebody That I Used to Know"	
37	September 16	Juan Magan (feat. Belinda)	"Te Voy A Esperar"		37	September 14	Gotye (feat. Kimbra)	"Somebody That I Used to Know"	
38	September 23	Juan Magan (feat. Belinda)	"Te Voy A Esperar"		38	September 21	Gotye (feat. Kimbra)	"Somebody That I Used to Know"	
39	September 30	Juan Magan (feat. Belinda)	"Te Voy A Esperar"		39	September 28	Gotye (feat. Kimbra)	"Somebody That I Used to Know"	
40	October 7	Juan Magan (feat. Belinda)	"Te Voy A Esperar"		40	October 5	Gotye (feat. Kimbra)	"Somebody That I Used to Know"	
41	October 14	Juan Magan (feat. Belinda)	"Te Voy A Esperar"		41	October 12	Gotye (feat. Kimbra)	"Somebody That I Used to Know"	
42	October 21	Robert Ramírez	"You Are Not Alone"		42	October 19	Gotye (feat. Kimbra)	"Somebody That I Used to Know"	
43	October 28	Juan Magan (feat. Belinda)	"Te Voy a Esperar"		43	October 26	Gotye (feat. Kimbra)	"Somebody That I Used to Know"	
44	November 4	Juan Magan (feat. Belinda)	"Te Voy a Esperar"		44	November 2	Gotye (feat. Kimbra)	"Somebody That I Used to Know"	
45	November 11	Juan Magan (feat. Belinda)	"Te Voy a Esperar"		45	November 9	Pablo Alborán	"Tanto"	
46	November 18	PSY	"Gangnam Style"		46	November 16	Train	"Drive By"	
47	November 25	PSY	"Gangnam Style"		47	November 23	Pablo Alborán	"Tanto"	
48	December 2	PSY	"Gangnam Style"		48	November 30	Pablo Alborán	"Tanto"	
49	December 9	PSY	"Gangnam Style"		49	December 7	Pablo Alborán	"Tanto"	
50	December 16	PSY	"Gangnam Style"		50	December 14	Pablo Alborán	"Tanto"	
51	December 23	PSY	"Gangnam Style"		51	December 21	Alicia Keys	"Girl on Fire"	
52	December 30	PSY	"Gangnam Style"		52	December 28	Alicia Keys	"Girl on Fire"	
