= Me Gusta (Anitta song) =

Single by Anitta featuring Cardi B and Myke Towers

from the album Versions of Me
- Language: English; Spanish
- Released: September 18, 2020
- Genre: Latin pop; reggaeton; funk carioca; pagode baiano
- Length: 3:01
- Label: Warner
- Songwriters: Larissa de Macedo; Belcalis Almanzar; Michael Torres; Andres Torres; Carolina Colón; Mauricio Rengifo; Benito Garcia; Rafa Dias; Ryan Tedder; Wallace Chibatinha
- Producers: Ryan Tedder; Andres Torres; Mauricio Rengifo; RDD

Anitta singles chronology
| "Tá com o Papato" (2020) | "Me Gusta" (2020) | "Modo Turbo" (2020) |

Cardi B singles chronology
| "WAP" (2020) | "Me Gusta" (2020) | "Up" (2021) |

Myke Towers singles chronology
| "La Luz" (2020) | "Me Gusta" (2020) | "Mi Niña" (2020) |

24kGoldn singles chronology
| "Tick Tock" (2020) | "Me Gusta (Remix)" (2020) | "I Admit It" (2020) |

Music video
- "Me Gusta" on YouTube

"Me Gusta" is a song by Brazilian singer Anitta featuring American rapper Cardi B and Puerto Rican rapper Myke Towers, from Anitta's fifth studio album Versions of Me. It was released as the lead single from the album through Warner Records on September 18, 2020. The song's music video was filmed in Salvador, Bahia, and released the same day. A remix featuring American singer 24kGoldn was released on November 20, 2020.

== Background and release ==
Anitta began shooting the music video for "Me Gusta" on February 13, 2020, in the Historic Center of Salvador—a city in which she had already recorded the music video for the song "Bola Rebola"—surrounded by journalists and the local population. She posted the behind-the-scenes footage on her Instagram profile.

"Me Gusta" was originally set to be released in April 2020; however, on March 27, 2020, Anitta announced she had to postpone the release of the song amid the COVID-19 pandemic. Later, on August 19, 2020, Anitta announced she would once again postpone the release of the song because of a "great opportunity" related to its release. She was originally scheduled to perform "Me Gusta" on the American TV show The Late Late Show with James Corden on August 20, 2020, but due to the delay of "Me Gusta", she chose to perform her 2020 song "Tócame".

Anitta then confirmed "Me Gusta" would be released on September 18, 2020. A week before the song's release, Anitta made suspense on her social media and posted a photo in which she appeared along with Myke Towers and a silhouette of a then-unknown artist. The singer then clarified that the silhouette belonged to an artist that would be featured in "Me Gusta" along with Towers. Two days after teasing the secret collaboration, Anitta confirmed that Cardi B would be featured on the song. Anitta then revealed that she was thrilled to learn that the rapper agreed to participate in the song and that Cardi B was a last-minute addition.

"Me Gusta" was then released worldwide on September 18, 2020, along with its music video.

The song features on the soundtrack for EA Sports' football video game FIFA 21.

== Production ==
Musically, "Me Gusta" is a Latin pop and reggaeton song with some funk carioca and pagode baiano influences. Anitta and Cardi B perform in English and Spanish, while Myke Towers performs in the latter. In her verse, Cardi portrays her alter-ego "La Cardi" and references singer Shakira.

== Critical reception ==
In GQ, Isaac Garrido called it "an ode to Brazilian rhythms and colors". He further added that Anitta's voice "merges with that of Cardi B, with whom she achieves a synergy that celebrates the Latin spirit and together they own the touches of hip-hop and rap, delivered in a melodic Spanglish", and praised Myke Towers' verse.

== Accolades ==
Awards and nominations for "Me Gusta"
| Year | Organization | Award | Result | Ref. |
|---|---|---|---|---|
| 2020 | Capricho Awards | Feature of the Year | Won | |
| 2020 | CONTIGO! Online Award | Best Song of the Year | Nominated | |
| 2020 | F5 Awards | Hit of the Year | Won | |
| 2020 | POP Mais Awards | Best Music Video | Won | |
| 2020 | Latin Music Italian Awards | Best Latin Female Video | Won | |
| 2020 | Latin Music Italian Awards | Best Spanglish Song | Won | |
| 2020 | Splash Awards | Best International Song of the Year | Nominated | |
| 2020 | Splash Awards | Best National Videoclip | Nominated | |
| 2020 | TodaTeen Awards | Feat of the Year | Nominated | |
| 2020 | Top 50 Music Awards | Best Song | Nominated | |
| 2020 | Top 50 Music Awards | Best Collaboration | Nominated | |
| 2020 | Women's Music Event Awards | Best Mainstream Music | Nominated | |
| 2021 | Break Tudo Awards | Latin Hit | Won | |
| 2021 | Premios Juventud | OMG Collaboration | Nominated | |
| 2021 | Premios Lo Nuestro | Crossover Collaboration of the Year | Nominated | |
| 2021 | Tudo Information Awards | Best International Feature of the Year | Won | |
| 2021 | Tudo Information Awards | Clip Do Not Quit Replay | Won | |
| 2021 | Tudo Information Awards | Favorite Feature | Won | |

== Chart performance ==
"Me Gusta" peaked at number 5 and number 6 on the US Billboard Hot Latin Songs and Latin Pop Airplay charts, respectively; the song debuted at No. 91 on the mainstream Billboard Hot 100 chart dated October 3, 2020, making Anitta the first Brazilian artist to have an entry on the chart in the 2020s. The single also became Anitta and Myke Tower's first entry onto the US Billboard Hot 100.

Globally, "Me Gusta" peaked at No. 1 in Brazil (Pop Internacional), No. 3 in Venezuela, No. 6 in Ecuador, No. 7 in Colombia, Honduras and Mexico, and No. 10 in Panama. It was a Top 20 hit in Argentina, Paraguay, Peru, Portugal and Puerto Rico.

== Music video ==
Directed by Daniel Russel, the music video was filmed in Salvador, Bahia and premiered on September 18, 2020. It features Afro-Brazilians and Afro-Latina females from the Salvador area and people from LGBTQ+ communities. The video shows scenes at a carnaval-like street party, with Anitta playing percussion instruments with a group of female musicians in the streets. Other scenes involve a public fashion show and a runway. In the video, Anitta wears several colorful outfits, including a flowing rainbow dress, a green leopard-print jacket with pants and heels, and a shorter red outfit with hot pants. Cardi B wears a lavender corset and a flowing, rose-covered skirt.

Anitta commented in an interview with NBC News that she received advice from an expert on Afro-Brazilian history on how to best showcase the Bahía roots through imagery, stating: "I understand it's music for people to have fun... But[,] in the video, from behind, we have a message. We are exalting all types of women and saying how much we like it when they do whatever they want to do".

== Charts ==
=== Weekly charts ===
| Chart (2020) | Peak position |
|---|---|
| Argentina Hot 100 (Billboard) | 59 |
| Argentina Airplay (Monitor Latino) | 14 |
| Belgium (Ultratip Bubbling Under Wallonia) | 15 |
| Brazil (Pop Internacional) | 1 |
| Brazil (UBC Top 10 streaming) | 3 |
| Brazil (Top 100 Airplay) | 14 |
| Canada Hot 100 (Billboard) | 92 |
| Colombia (National-Report) | 22 |
| Colombia Pop (Monitor Latino) | 7 |
| Ecuador (Monitor Latino) | 6 |
| Global 200 (Billboard) | 37 |
| Greece (IFPI) | 92 |
| Honduras Pop (Monitor Latino) | 7 |
| Hungary (Single Top 40) | 40 |
| Ireland (IRMA) | 63 |
| Lithuania (AGATA) | 98 |
| Mexico Airplay (Billboard) | 18 |
| Mexico Pop Espanol Airplay (Billboard) | 3 |
| Mexico Pop (Monitor Latino) | 7 |
| New Zealand Hot Singles (RMNZ) | 16 |
| Panama (Monitor Latino) | 10 |
| Paraguay (Monitor Latino) | 12 |
| Peru (Monitor Latino) | 12 |
| Portugal (AFP) | 19 |
| Puerto Rico (Monitor Latino) | 13 |
| Romania (Airplay 100) | 76 |
| Spain (PROMUSICAE) | 82 |
| Switzerland (Schweizer Hitparade) | 56 |
| US Billboard Hot 100 | 91 |
| US Hot Latin Songs (Billboard) | 5 |
| US Latin Airplay (Billboard) | 23 |
| US Latin Pop Airplay (Billboard) | 6 |
| US Latin Rhythm Airplay (Billboard) | 13 |
| Venezuela (Monitor Latino) | 3 |

| Chart (2021) | Peak position |
|---|---|
| US Latin Digital Song Sales (Billboard) | 11 |

=== Monthly charts ===
| Chart (2020) | Position |
|---|---|
| Brazil (Top 50 Streaming) | 5 |

=== Year-end charts ===
| Chart (2020) | Position |
|---|---|
| US Latin Pop Airplay Songs (Billboard) | 47 |

| Chart (2021) | Position |
|---|---|
| Brazil Top Streaming Songs (Pro-Música Brasil) | 177 |
| US Latin Pop Airplay Songs (Billboard) | 34 |

== Certifications and sales ==
| Region | Certification | Certified units/sales |
|---|---|---|
| Brazil (Pro-Música Brasil) | 3× Diamond | 480,000^{‡} |
| Portugal (AFP) | Platinum | 10,000^{‡} |
^{‡} Sales+streaming figures based on certification alone.

== Release history ==
| Region | Date | Format(s) | Label(s) | Ref. |
|---|---|---|---|---|
| Various | September 18, 2020 | Digital download; streaming | Warner | |
| Italy | September 25, 2020 | Contemporary hit radio | Warner | |
