= Cangaia de Jegue =

Brazilian band from Jequié, southwest Bahia, Brazil

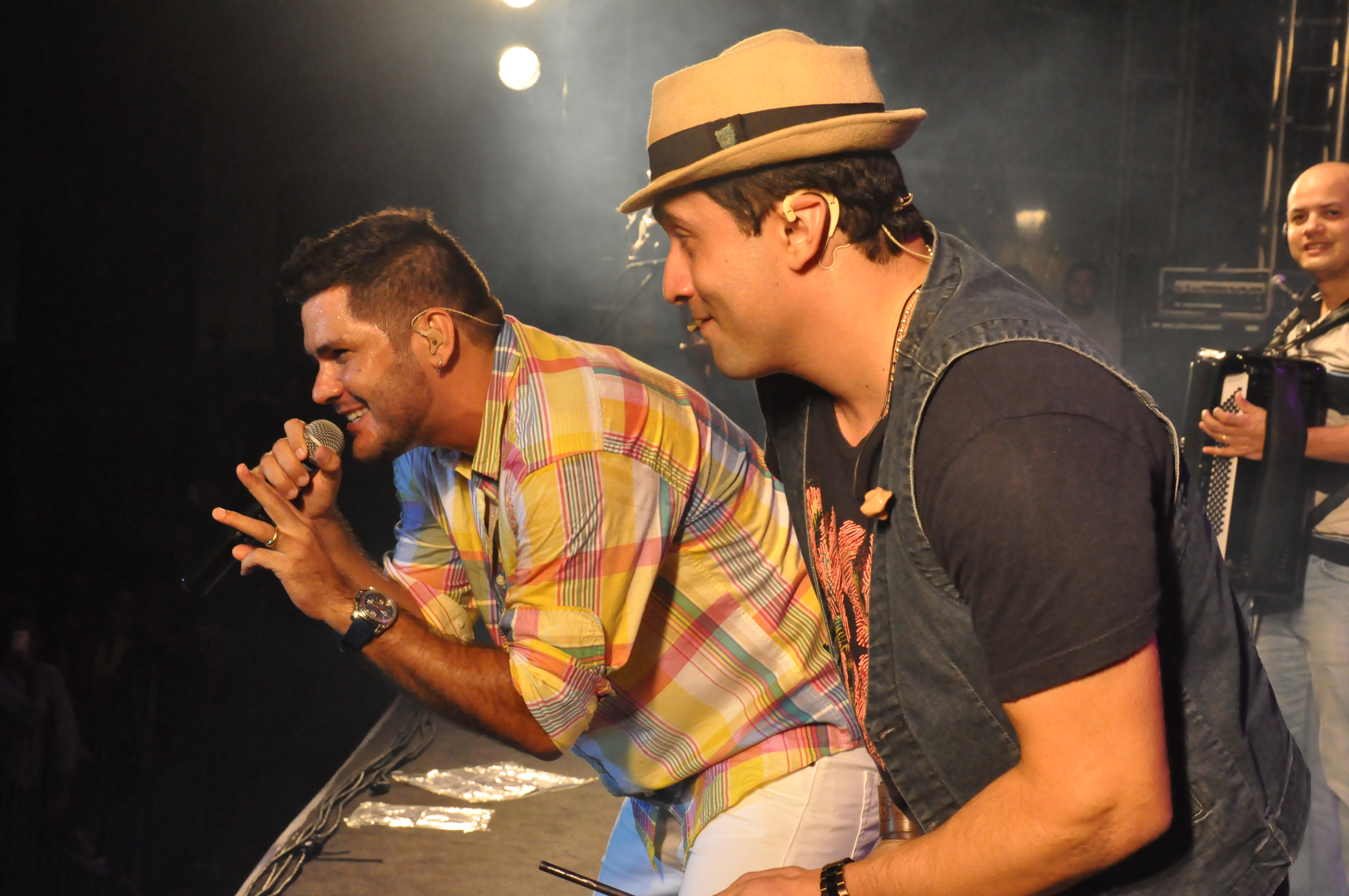
Cangaia de Jegue, 2014

Cangaia de Jegue is a Brazilian band from Jequié, southwest Bahia, Brazil. It has released albums Cangaia de Jegue (2004) and Você vai ver (2006) and a live album Cangaia de Jegue – Ao Vivo) in 2009. The band is very popular in Bahia state which is its base. The greatest claim to fame of Banda Cangaia de Jegue is their hit "Ai se eu te pego!". The song appears also in their promotional CD album of same title Ai se eu te pego!. The song co-written by Sharon Acioly and Antônio Dyggs (and sung much earlier by Os Meninos de Seu Zeh directed by Antônio Dyggs), became a later massive Brazilian and international hit by Brazilian singer Michel Teló with slightly amended lyrics.

== Career ==
In August 2002, four Brazilian university students got together in Jequié nicknamed "A cidade do sol" (city of sun) forming a band that played at university gigs and various social occasions. They wanted to call it the Cangaia band (local slang for "yoke" put on animals to carry the load). But discovering that the name was already used by another band, they decided to add "of something" so they picked the donkey (jegue) renaming the band "Cangaia de Jegue" (the yoke of the donkey) in a cheeky reference to the commonly known area "República dos Jegues" (the republic of donkeys).

Becoming instantly popular in their city, singer Norberto Curvello penned the song "Saudade do Interior" in gratitude followed by the 2004 self-titled album Cangaia de Jegue, with many tracks becoming hits on local Bahia radio, most notably the songs "O beijo teu" (Your Kiss) and "De frente pro mar" (Beachfront) with the latter becoming popular with Estakazero, a well-established local band, doing a cover of the Cangaia track. Cangaia also took part in João de Jequié, Forró da Margarida, Forró da Onça, and were regular features at Jaguaquara Coffe and Forró Coffe, in Itiruçu.

In 2006 the band moved to Bahia's bigger coastline city Salvador for bigger opportunities, releasing their second album Você vai ver (meaning You will see) following it up with a DVD launched in Jequié first and then in other cities, thus competing with better known bands like Estakazero and Seu Maxixe.

After the success of the song "Ai se eu te pego!" by Michel Teló, Cangaia de Jegue are enjoying a huge increase in their popularity throughout Brazil as fans check the earlier version of the song before Michel Teló's release.

== Members ==
The initial formation of the band was just 4 members

- Norberto Curvêllo (vocals and guitar)
- Marcelo Capucho (bass drums)
- Junior Bomfim (triangle)
- Humberto Júnior (bass)

The present day formation is made up of 6 permanent members:

- Norberto Curvêllo (vocals and guitar)
- Junior Bomfim (triangle and vocals)
- Allê Barbosa (bass)
- Clécio Carvalho (accordion)
- Serginho di Boca (bass drums, drums, vocals).
- Bruno Valverde (guitar).

Sometimes Marcelo Tribal also takes part with bass drum and percussion.

== Discography ==
=== Albums ===
- 2004: Cangaia de Jegue
- 2006: Você vai ver (The album contains collaboration with Leo Macedo (of band Estakazero))
- 2009: Cangaia Inté o Sol Raia (CD / DVD) (Contains collaborations with Circuladô de fulo, the trio Virgulino, Rastapé and Waldo)
- 2009: Cangaia de Jegue – Ao Vivo (live album)
- 2010: Ai se eu te pego (promotional CD)
- 2014: Cangaia de Jegue (CD)

==== Ai se eu te pego! ====
Track list

1. "Chama essa cerveja"
2. "Dedinho na boca"
3. "Cachaça véa"
4. "Ai se eu te pego"
5. "Solteiro de novo"
6. "Sei não"
7. "Balada"
8. "Cachaça na mão"
9. "Mulher danada"
10. "Do jeito que tu vaz e carinhoso"
11. Coração tapado"
12. "Agora é beber"
13. "Galera louca"
14. "Neide"
15. "Festa de camisa"
16. "Triste, allegre"
17. "Me chama de my love"
18. "Sinto falta" (bonus)

=== Singles ===
- 2004: "Saudade do Interior"
- 2006: "O beijo teu"
- 2006: "De frente pro mar"
- 2008: "Ai se eu te pego"
- 2009: "Dança do Ice"
- 2011: "Bolo doido"
- 2012: "Sexta feira, sua linda"
- 2014: "Jeito carinhoso" (Cangaia feat. Tom)
- 2015: "Pegou, beijou"
