= List of Ultratop 50 number-one singles of 2012 =

Below is a list of hits that topped the Ultratop 50 in 2012.

Flemish chart
Issue date	Song	Artist
7 January	"I Follow Rivers"	Lykke Li
14 January	"Ai Se Eu Te Pego!"	Michel Teló
21 January	"Ai Se Eu Te Pego!"	Michel Teló
28 January	"Ai Se Eu Te Pego!"	Michel Teló
4 February	"Ai Se Eu Te Pego!"	Michel Teló
11 February	"Ai Se Eu Te Pego!"	Michel Teló
18 February	"Ai Se Eu Te Pego!"	Michel Teló
25 February	"Ai Se Eu Te Pego!"	Michel Teló
3 March	"Ai Se Eu Te Pego!"	Michel Teló
10 March	"I Follow Rivers"	Triggerfinger
17 March	"I Follow Rivers"	Triggerfinger
24 March	"I Follow Rivers"	Triggerfinger
31 March	"I Follow Rivers"	Triggerfinger
7 April	"I Follow Rivers"	Triggerfinger
14 April	"I Follow Rivers"	Triggerfinger
21 April	"I Follow Rivers"	Triggerfinger
28 April	"Balada"	Gusttavo Lima
5 May	"Balada"	Gusttavo Lima
12 May	"Balada"	Gusttavo Lima
19 May	"Balada"	Gusttavo Lima
26 May	"Balada"	Gusttavo Lima
2 June	"Happiness"	Sam Sparro
9 June	"Euphoria"	Loreen
16 June	"Happiness"	Sam Sparro
23 June	"Happiness"	Sam Sparro
30 June	"Happiness"	Sam Sparro
7 July	"Happiness"	Sam Sparro
14 July	"Happiness"	Sam Sparro
21 July	"Happiness"	Sam Sparro
28 July	"Balada"	Gusttavo Lima
4 August	"Balada"	Gusttavo Lima
11 August	"This Is Love"	will.i.am featuring Eva Simons
18 August	"This Is Love"	will.i.am featuring Eva Simons
25 August	"One Day / Reckoning Song" (Wankelmut Remix)	Asaf Avidan
1 September	"One Day / Reckoning Song" (Wankelmut Remix)	Asaf Avidan
8 September	"One Day / Reckoning Song" (Wankelmut Remix)	Asaf Avidan
15 September	"One Day / Reckoning Song" (Wankelmut Remix)	Asaf Avidan
22 September	"One Day / Reckoning Song" (Wankelmut Remix)	Asaf Avidan
29 September	"Gangnam Style"	PSY
6 October	"Gangnam Style"	PSY
13 October	"Gangnam Style"	PSY
20 October	"Gangnam Style"	PSY
27 October	"Gangnam Style"	PSY
3 November	"Skyfall"	Adele
10 November	"Skyfall"	Adele
17 November	"Skyfall"	Adele
24 November	"Skyfall"	Adele
1 December	"Let Her Go"	Passenger
8 December	"Let Her Go"	Passenger
15 December	"Het Meneer Konijn lied"	De Vrienden Van Meneer Konijn (various artists)
22 December	"Scream & Shout"	will.i.am featuring Britney Spears
29 December	"Scream & Shout"	will.i.am featuring Britney Spears

Ranking of most weeks at number 1

Position	Artist	Weeks #1
1	Michel Teló	8
2	Sam Sparro	7
=	Triggerfinger	7
=	Gusttavo Lima	7
5	Asaf Avidan	5
=	PSY	5
7	Adele	4
=	will.i.am	4
9	Eva Simons	2
=	Passenger	2
=	Britney Spears	2
12	De Vrienden Van Meneer Konijn	1
=	Loreen	1
=	Lykke Li	1

Francophone chart
Issue date	Song	Artist
7 January	"I Follow Rivers"	Lykke Li
14 January	"Je l'aime à mourir"	Shakira
21 January	"Je l'aime à mourir"	Shakira
28 January	"Ai se eu te pego"	Michel Teló
4 February	"Ai se eu te pego"	Michel Teló
11 February	"Ai se eu te pego"	Michel Teló
18 February	"Ai se eu te pego"	Michel Teló
25 February	"Ai se eu te pego"	Michel Teló
3 March	"Ai se eu te pego"	Michel Teló
10 March	"Ai se eu te pego"	Michel Teló
17 March	"Ai se eu te pego"	Michel Teló
24 March	"Ai se eu te pego"	Michel Teló
31 March	"Ai se eu te pego"	Michel Teló
7 April	"Ai se eu te pego"	Michel Teló
14 April	"Avant qu'elle parte"	Sexion d'Assaut
21 April	"Avant qu'elle parte"	Sexion d'Assaut
28 April	"Somebody That I Used to Know"	Gotye featuring Kimbra
5 May	"Le sens de la vie"	Tal
12 May	"Somebody That I Used to Know"	Gotye featuring Kimbra
19 May	"Somebody That I Used to Know"	Gotye featuring Kimbra
26 May	"Somebody That I Used to Know"	Gotye featuring Kimbra
2 June	"Somebody That I Used to Know"	Gotye featuring Kimbra
9 June	"Somebody That I Used to Know"	Gotye featuring Kimbra
16 June	"Somebody That I Used to Know"	Gotye featuring Kimbra
23 June	"Happiness"	Sam Sparro
30 June	"Happiness"	Sam Sparro
7 July	"Happiness"	Sam Sparro
14 July	"Happiness"	Sam Sparro
21 July	"Happiness"	Sam Sparro
28 July	"Happiness"	Sam Sparro
4 August	"Happiness"	Sam Sparro
11 August	"Happiness"	Sam Sparro
18 August	"One Day / Reckoning Song" (Wankelmut Remix)	Asaf Avidan
25 August	"One Day / Reckoning Song" (Wankelmut Remix)	Asaf Avidan
1 September	"One Day / Reckoning Song" (Wankelmut Remix)	Asaf Avidan
8 September	"One Day / Reckoning Song" (Wankelmut Remix)	Asaf Avidan
15 September	"One Day / Reckoning Song" (Wankelmut Remix)	Asaf Avidan
22 September	"One Day / Reckoning Song" (Wankelmut Remix)	Asaf Avidan
29 September	"One Day / Reckoning Song" (Wankelmut Remix)	Asaf Avidan
6 October	"One Day / Reckoning Song" (Wankelmut Remix)	Asaf Avidan
13 October	"One Day / Reckoning Song" (Wankelmut Remix)	Asaf Avidan
20 October	"One Day / Reckoning Song" (Wankelmut Remix)	Asaf Avidan
27 October	"One Day / Reckoning Song" (Wankelmut Remix)	Asaf Avidan
3 November	"Skyfall"	Adele
10 November	"Skyfall"	Adele
17 November	"Skyfall"	Adele
24 November	"Skyfall"	Adele
1 December	"Gangnam Style"	PSY
8 December	"Gangnam Style"	PSY
15 December	"Gangnam Style"	PSY
22 December	"Gangnam Style"	PSY
29 December	"Gangnam Style"	PSY

Ranking of most weeks at number 1

Position	Artist	Weeks #1
1	Michel Teló	11
1	Asaf Avidan	11
3	Sam Sparro	8
4	Gotye	7
4	Kimbra	7
6	PSY	5
7	Adele	4
8	Shakira	2
8	Sexion d'Assaut	2
10	Tal	1
10	Lykke Li	1

== See also ==
- 2012 in music
