= Você Partiu Meu Coração =

2017 song

Single by Nego do Borel featuring Anitta and Wesley Safadão
- Language: Portuguese
- Released: 10 January 2017
- Genre: Latin pop; Sertanejo universitário; dancehall
- Length: 2:59
- Label: Sony Music
- Songwriters: Jefferson Junior; Umberto Tavarez; Romeu R3
- Producers: Umberto Tavares; Mãozinha

Nego do Borel singles chronology
"Ela Vai Além" (2016)	"Você Partiu Meu Coração" (2017)	"Esqueci como Namora" (2017)

Anitta singles chronology
"Loka" (2017)	"Você Partiu Meu Coração" (2017)	"Switch" (2017)

Wesley Safadão singles chronology
"Precipício" (2017)	"Você Partiu Meu Coração" (2017)	"Olha a Explosão" (2017)

Music video
- "Você Partiu Meu Coração" on YouTube

"Você Partiu Meu Coração" (transl. "You Broke My Heart") is a song recorded by Brazilian Nego do Borel, featuring Brazilian singers Anitta and Wesley Safadão. It was written by Romeu R3, Jefferson Junior, and Umberto Tavarez, and was produced by Umberto Tavares and Mãozinha.

== Music video ==
The music video was recorded on 3 February 2017 during the pre-Carnival of Rio de Janeiro. It was directed by por Mess Santos and Phill Mendonça and released on 19 February. The video was inspired by the Brazilian novel, Dona Flor and Her Two Husbands, written by Jorge Amado. "Você Partiu Meu Coração" was – at that time – the most watched music video within 24 hours in Brazil, having 2.8 million views.

== Track listing ==
Digital download
No.	Title	Writer(s)	Producer(s)	Length
1.	"Você Partiu Meu Coração" (featuring Anitta and Wesley Safadão)	Romeu R3; Jefferson Junior; Umberto Tavarez	Umberto Tavares; Mãozinha	2:59

== Charts ==
=== Weekly charts ===
Chart (2017)	Peak position
Brazil (Brasil Hot 100 Airplay)	21
Bolivia (Monitor Latino)	1
Portugal (AFP)	21

=== Year-end charts ===
Chart (2017)	Position
Brazil (Pro-Música Brasil)	9

Chart (2018)	Position
Portugal (AFP)	182

== Maluma version ==
"Corazón"

Single by Maluma featuring Nego do Borel

from the album F.A.M.E.
- Language: Spanish, Portuguese
- English title: "Heart"
- Released: 3 November 2017
- Length: 3:04
- Label: Sony Latin
- Songwriters: Juan Luis Londoño; Kevin Jiménez; Jeferson Almeida; Umberto Tavarez; Bryan Lezcano; Aurélio Martins
- Producers: Umberto Tavares; Mãozinha; The Rude Boyz

Maluma singles chronology
"Vivo Pensando en Tí" (2017)	"Corazón" (2017)	"Solo a Solas" (2017)

Nego do Borel singles chronology
"Esqueci Como Namora" (2017)	"Corazón" (2017)	"Eu Vacilei Mas Eu Te Amo" (2017)

Music video
- "Corazón" on YouTube

"Corazón" is a song recorded by Colombian singer Maluma featuring Brazilian singer Nego do Borel. It is a remix of Nego do Borel's song "Você Partiu Meu Coração" and was released on 3 November 2017 as the lead single from Maluma's third studio album, F.A.M.E. (2018). It was written by Maluma, Kevin Jiménez, Jeferson Almeida, Umberto Tavarez, Bryan Lezcano and Aurélio Martins, and produced by Tavarez, Mãozinha and The Rude Boyz. The single has peaked at number 87 on the Billboard Hot 100 and at number five on the Billboard Hot Latin Songs chart.

=== Background and release ===
On 21 April 2017, Maluma released the lead single "Felices los 4" from his upcoming third studio album X. However the name of album was changed and its lead single became "Corazón", as it was later confirmed that the latter song was not to be included on the album at the time.

On 30 October 2017, Maluma revealed via social media the name and release date of "Corazón", which was set to be released on 3 November 2017. The post contained a neon heart with a non-lit crack in the center, which on the days leading up to the release of the single would further light up until it eventually showed a completely lit, broken neon heart.

=== Commercial performance ===
In the United States, "Corazón" debuted at number 92 on the Billboard Hot 100 on 13 January 2018, marking Maluma's third entry and Borel's first entry; the latter is the tenth Brazilian act to enter the chart.

=== Music video ===
The music video for "Corazón" premiered on 8 December 2017 on Maluma's Vevo account on YouTube. It was directed by Jessy Terrero and shot in São Paulo, Brazil. Ronaldinho Gaúcho makes a cameo appearance in the video. As of December 2025, the video has over 1.7 billion views on YouTube.

=== Track listing ===
Digital download
No.	Title	Writer(s)	Producer(s)	Length
1.	"Corazón" (featuring Nego do Borel)	Romeu R3; Bryan Lezcano; Kevin Jimenez; Juan Luis Londoño; Jefferson Junior; Umberto Tavarez	Rude Boyz; Umberto Tavares; Mãozinha; Carlos Lago da Costa	3:04

=== Charts ===
Chart (2017–18)	Peak position
Argentina (Monitor Latino)	1
Bolivia (Monitor Latino)	1
Chile (Monitor Latino)	2
Colombia (Monitor Latino)	2
Colombia (National-Report)	2
Costa Rica (Monitor Latino)	2
Dominican Republic (Monitor Latino)	4
Dominican Republic (SODINPRO)	33
Ecuador (Monitor Latino)	1
Ecuador (National-Report)	1
El Salvador (Monitor Latino)	1
France (SNEP)	184
Guatemala (Monitor Latino)	2
Honduras (Monitor Latino)	3
Italy (FIMI)	70
Mexico (Monitor Latino)	1
Mexico Airplay (Billboard)	1
Nicaragua (Monitor Latino)	3
Panama (Monitor Latino)	5
Paraguay (Monitor Latino)	2
Peru (Monitor Latino)	2
Portugal (AFP)	31
Slovakia Airplay (ČNS IFPI)	54
Slovenia (SloTop50)	16
Spain (PROMUSICAE)	3
Sweden Heatseeker (Sverigetopplistan)	14
Switzerland (Schweizer Hitparade)	50
Uruguay (Monitor Latino)	1
US Billboard Hot 100	87
US Hot Latin Songs (Billboard)	5
US Latin Airplay (Billboard)	1
US Latin Rhythm Airplay (Billboard)	1
Venezuela (Monitor Latino)	1

=== Year-end charts ===
Chart (2018)	Position
Argentina (Monitor Latino)	6
Portugal (AFP)	76
Spain (PROMUSICAE)	24
US Hot Latin Songs (Billboard)	12

=== Certifications ===
Region	Certification	Certified units/sales
Brazil (Pro-Música Brasil)	2× Platinum	80,000^{‡}
Canada (Music Canada)	Gold	40,000^{‡}
France (SNEP)	Gold	100,000^{‡}
Italy (FIMI)	Platinum	50,000^{‡}
Mexico (AMPROFON)	Diamond+3× Platinum	480,000^{‡}
Poland (ZPAV)	Platinum	20,000^{‡}
Portugal (AFP)	Platinum	10,000^{‡}
Spain (Promusicae)	3× Platinum	180,000^{‡}
Switzerland (IFPI Switzerland)	Platinum	20,000^{‡}
United States (RIAA)	11× Platinum (Latin)	660,000^{‡}
Streaming
Sweden (GLF)	Gold	4,000,000^{†}
^{‡} Sales+streaming figures based on certification alone.^{†} Streaming-only figures based on certification alone.

=== Release history ===
Region	Date	Format	Label	Ref.
Various	4 November 2017	Digital download	Sony Latin	

== See also ==
- List of number-one songs of 2017 (Mexico)
- List of number-one songs of 2018 (Mexico)
- List of airplay number-one hits of the 2010s (Argentina)
- List of Billboard number-one Latin songs of 2018
