= I Follow Rivers =

2011 single by Lykke Li

Single by Lykke Li

from the album Wounded Rhymes
- Released: 21 January 2011
- Genre: Gothic pop; dance; pop rock
- Length: 3:48 (original version); 4:45 (The Magician remix)
- Label: LL Recordings; EMI (Scandinavia); Atlantic (rest of world)
- Songwriters: Lykke Li; Björn Yttling; Rick Nowels
- Producer: Björn Yttling

Lykke Li singles chronology
"Get Some" (2010)	"I Follow Rivers" (2011)	"Sadness Is a Blessing" (2011)

Music video
- "I Follow Rivers" on YouTube

"I Follow Rivers" is a song by Swedish recording artist Lykke Li from her second studio album, Wounded Rhymes (2011). Produced by Björn Yttling of Peter Bjorn and John, it was released on 21 January 2011 as the album's second single. The track premiered exclusively on SPIN.com on 10 January 2011.

Belgian DJ/producer the Magician remixed and reworked "I Follow Rivers" in 2011, peaking at number one in Belgium, Germany, Italy, Poland, and Romania, number two in Switzerland, Austria, Ireland, and the Netherlands, and number four in France. The remix was deemed "'90s house". Belgian band Triggerfinger covered "I Follow Rivers" in 2012, peaking at number one in Austria, Belgium and the Netherlands.

== Music video ==
The music video, directed by Tarik Saleh and filmed at Närsholmen on the Swedish island of Gotland, features Li in a black robe and veil chasing a man (Swedish-Lebanese actor Fares Fares) through a snowy landscape.

== Track listings ==
- Danish, Finnish, Norwegian and Swedish iTunes EP – Remixes
1. "I Follow Rivers" – 3:42
2. "I Follow Rivers" (Dave Sitek Remix) – 3:58
3. "I Follow Rivers" (The Magician Remix) – 4:40
4. "I Follow Rivers" (Van Rivers & The Sublimial Kid) – 6:41
- UK iTunes EP
1. "I Follow Rivers" – 3:48
2. "I Follow Rivers" (Dave Sitek Remix) – 3:58
3. "I Follow Rivers" (Van Rivers & The Sublimial Kid) – 6:41
- UK 7" single

A. "I Follow Rivers" – 3:48
B. "Get Some" (Primary 1 Remix)

- UK 12" single – The Remixes

A1. "I Follow Rivers" – 3:48
A2. "I Follow Rivers" (The Magician Remix) – 4:40
B1. "I Follow Rivers" (Van Rivers & The Subliminal Kid Remix) – 6:41
B2. "I Follow Rivers" (Tyler, The Creator Remix) – 3:41

- German CD single
1. "I Follow Rivers" (The Magician Remix) – 4:40
2. "I Follow Rivers" (Radio Edit) – 3:20

== Charts ==
=== Weekly charts ===
Weekly chart performance for "I Follow Rivers"
Chart (2011–2019)	Peak position
Austria (Ö3 Austria Top 40)	2
Belgium (Ultratop 50 Flanders)	1
Belgium (Ultratop 50 Wallonia)	1
Brazil (Billboard Hot 100 Airplay)	48
Brazil (Hot Pop Songs)	12
Czech Republic Airplay (ČNS IFPI)	5
Denmark (Tracklisten)	40
Euro Digital Song Sales (Billboard)	10
France (SNEP) The Magician Remix	4
Germany (GfK)	1
Global Dance Songs (Billboard)	21
Greece Digital Songs (Billboard)	1
Hungary (Rádiós Top 40)	6
Hungary (Dance Top 40)	2
Ireland (IRMA)	2
Italy (FIMI)	1
Italy Airplay (EarOne)	1
Luxembourg Digital Song Sales (Billboard)	1
Mexico Ingles Airplay (Billboard)	37
Netherlands (Dutch Top 40)	2
Netherlands (Single Top 100)	3
Poland Airplay (ZPAV)	1
Poland Dance (ZPAV)	1
Portugal Digital Song Sales (Billboard)	3
Romania (Romanian Top 100)	1
Romania Airplay (Media Forest)	1
Romania TV Airplay (Media Forest)	1
Slovakia Airplay (ČNS IFPI)	13
Slovenia (SloTop50)	14
Sweden (Sverigetopplistan)	44
Switzerland (Schweizer Hitparade)	2
UK Physical Singles Sales Chart (OCC)	30

Weekly chart performance for "I Follow Rivers (The Magician Remix)"
Chart (2015–2025)	Peak position
CIS Airplay (TopHit) The Magician Remix Radio Edit	5
Euro Digital Tracks (Billboard)	8
Moldova Airplay (TopHit)	39
Russia Airplay (TopHit) The Magician Remix Radio Edit	1
Ukraine Airplay (TopHit) The Magician Remix Radio Edit	15

=== Monthly charts ===
2025 monthly chart performance for "I Follow Rivers (The Magician Remix)"
Chart (2025)	Position
Moldova Airplay (TopHit)	88

=== Year-end charts ===
2011 year-end chart performance for "I Follow Rivers"
Chart (2011)	Position
Belgium (Ultratop 50 Flanders)	7
Belgium (Ultratop 50 Wallonia)	7
Netherlands (Dutch Top 40)	179

2012 year-end chart performance for "I Follow Rivers"
Chart (2012)	Position
Austria (Ö3 Austria Top 40)	21
Belgium (Ultratop 50 Flanders)	12
Belgium (Ultratop 50 Wallonia)	7
France (SNEP)	6
Germany (Media Control AG)	3
Hungary (Dance Top 40)	18
Hungary (Rádiós Top 40)	15
Ireland (IRMA)	16
Netherlands (Dutch Top 40)	3
Netherlands (Single Top 100)	4
Romania (Romanian Top 100)	1
Russia Airplay (TopHit)	72
Switzerland (Schweizer Hitparade)	9

2013 year-end chart performance for "I Follow Rivers"
Chart (2013)	Position
Brazil (Crowley)	64
France (SNEP)	45
Hungary (Dance Top 40)	25
Hungary (Rádiós Top 40)	97
Italy (FIMI)	7
Italy Airplay (EarOne)	10
Slovenia (SloTop50)	28
Russia Airplay (TopHit)	1
Switzerland (Schweizer Hitparade)	72
Ukraine Airplay (TopHit)	56

2014 year-end chart performance for "I Follow Rivers"
Chart (2014)	Position
France (SNEP)	83
Russia Airplay (TopHit)	148
Ukraine Airplay (TopHit)	187

2015 year-end chart performance for "I Follow Rivers"
Chart (2015)	Position
France (SNEP)	177

=== Decade-end charts ===
2010s decade-end chart performance for Fallen
Chart (2010–2019)	Position
Germany (Official German Charts)	44

=== All-time charts ===
All-time chart performance for "I Follow Rivers"
Chart	Position
Belgium (Wallonia) (BEA)	6

== Certifications ==
Certifications for "I Follow Rivers"
Region	Certification	Certified units/sales
Austria (IFPI Austria)	Platinum	30,000^{*}
Belgium (BRMA)	2× Platinum	60,000^{*}
Denmark (IFPI Danmark)	Platinum	90,000^{‡}
France (SNEP)	Diamond	250,000^{*}
Germany (BVMI)	5× Gold	750,000^{^}
Italy (FIMI)	3× Platinum	90,000^{*}
Spain (Promusicae)	2× Platinum	120,000^{‡}
Switzerland (IFPI Switzerland)	3× Platinum	90,000^{^}
United Kingdom (BPI)	Platinum	600,000^{‡}
United States (RIAA)	Platinum	1,000,000^{‡}
Streaming
Denmark (IFPI Danmark)	Gold	1,300,000^{†}
^{*} Sales figures based on certification alone.^{^} Shipments figures based on certification alone.^{‡} Sales+streaming figures based on certification alone.^{†} Streaming-only figures based on certification alone.

== Triggerfinger version ==
"I Follow Rivers"

Single by Triggerfinger
- Released: 24 February 2012
- Studio: 3FM (Hilversum, Netherlands)
- Genre: Pop
- Length: 3:35
- Label: B1M1
- Songwriters: Lykke Li; Björn Yttling; Rick Nowels

Triggerfinger singles chronology
"Let It Ride" (2011)	"I Follow Rivers" (2012)	"Do Ya Think I'm Sexy" (2012)

Live video
- "I Follow Rivers" on YouTube

Belgian band Triggerfinger covered "I Follow Rivers" during Giel Beelen's show on the Dutch radio station 3FM in what was called "a fragile version". They used glasses, cups, and knives to create a rhythmical background section. Triggerfinger's version was released as a single on 24 February 2012, topping the singles chart in Austria, Belgium, and the Netherlands, while reaching number nine in Germany and number seventeen in Switzerland.

=== Track listings ===
- Belgian and Dutch iTunes single
1. "I Follow Rivers" (Live@Giel! – VARA/3FM) – 3:34
- German CD single
1. "I Follow Rivers" (Live@Giel!) – 3:35
2. "Let It Ride" – 3:24

=== Charts ===
==== Weekly charts ====
Weekly chart performance for "I Follow Rivers" (Triggerfinger version)
Chart (2012)	Peak position
Austria (Ö3 Austria Top 40)	1
Belgium (Ultratop 50 Flanders)	1
Belgium (Ultratop 50 Wallonia)	4
Germany (GfK)	9
Luxembourg Digital Song Sales (Billboard)	7
Netherlands (Dutch Top 40)	1
Netherlands (Single Top 100)	1
Switzerland (Schweizer Hitparade)	17

==== Year-end charts ====
Weekly chart performance for "I Follow Rivers" (Triggerfinger version)
Chart (2012)	Position
Austria (Ö3 Austria Top 40)	16
Belgium (Ultratop 50 Flanders)	3
Belgium (Ultratop 50 Wallonia)	43
Germany (Media Control AG)	29
Netherlands (Dutch Top 40)	6
Switzerland (Schweizer Hitparade)	60

=== Certifications ===
Certifications for "I Follow Rivers" (Triggerfinger version)
Region	Certification	Certified units/sales
Austria (IFPI Austria)	Platinum	30,000^{*}
Belgium (BRMA)	2× Platinum	60,000^{*}
Germany (BVMI)	Gold	150,000^{^}
Netherlands (NVPI)	2× Platinum	40,000^{^}
Switzerland (IFPI Switzerland)	Gold	15,000^{^}
^{*} Sales figures based on certification alone.^{^} Shipments figures based on certification alone.

== Other versions and use in media ==
- "I Follow Rivers" was performed by Jenna Ushkowitz's character Tina Cohen-Chang in the Glee episode "A Night of Neglect", originally aired 19 April 2011. Rolling Stone said the performance was "mostly spot-on".
- The song was covered in German by FC Bayern Munich ultras, as "I Follow FC Bayern" and was used for the introduction to the television program Ran.
- American singers Jason Isbell and Amanda Shires covered the song on a 2015 two-song EP titled Sea Songs.
- Israeli singer-songwriter Roni Alter, accompanied by music producer Alon Lotringer, released an acoustic cover version in 2016.
- Canadian rapper Drake sampled the song in his 2026 song "Janice STFU".

== See also ==
- List of Airplay 100 number ones of the 2010s
- List of Dutch Top 40 number-one singles of 2012
- List of number-one hits of 2012 (Austria)
- List of number-one hits of 2012 (Germany)
- List of number-one hits of 2013 (Italy)
- List of number-one singles of 2012 (Poland)
- List of Romanian Top 100 number ones of the 2010s
- List of Ultratop 50 number-one singles of 2011
- List of Ultratop 50 number-one singles of 2012
