= List of Hot 100 number-one singles of 2012 (Brazil) =

This is a list of number one singles on the Billboard Brasil Hot 100 chart in 2012. Note that Billboard publishes a monthly chart.

== Chart history ==
Issue date	Song	Artist(s)	Reference
January 1	"Ai Se Eu te Pego"	Michel Teló	
February	"Someone Like You"	Adele	
March	"Someone Like You"	Adele	
April	"Humilde Residência"	Michel Teló	
May	"Incondicional"	Luan Santana	
June	"Humilde Residência"	Michel Teló	
July	"Sou o Cara pra Você"	Thiaguinho	
August	"Te Vivo"	Luan Santana	
September	"Te Vivo"	Luan Santana	
October	"Te Vivo"	Luan Santana	
November	"Te Vivo"	Luan Santana	
December	"Esse Cara Sou Eu"	Roberto Carlos	

== See also ==
- Billboard Brasil
- List of number-one pop hits of 2011 (Brazil)
- Crowley Broadcast Analysis
