= Get Some (song) =

Single by Lykke Li

from the album Wounded Rhymes
- B-side: "Paris Blue"
- Released: 22 October 2010
- Studio: Atlantis and Decibel Studios, Stockholm, Sweden
- Genre: Rock; electro
- Length: 3:22
- Label: LL
- Songwriter(s): Lykke Li; Björn Yttling
- Producer(s): Björn Yttling

Lykke Li singles chronology
"Tonight" (2008)	"Get Some" (2010)	"I Follow Rivers" (2011)

Music video
- "Get Some" on YouTube

"Get Some" is a song by Swedish singer and songwriter Lykke Li from her second studio album, Wounded Rhymes (2011). It was released on 22 October 2010 as the album's lead single. Li wrote the song with its producer Björn Yttling of Peter Bjorn and John.

== Writing and inspiration ==
During an interview for The Guardian on 13 December 2010, Li said of the song:

"A lot of people think it's about sex. [...] But it's about power. I was reading the [Haraki] Murakami book The Wind-Up Bird Chronicle, where she goes into this guy's mind by making him fantasize about her, so it's kind of like powerplay. As soon as a woman does anything, they seem to hit a nerve and it's back to sex. At least men seem to think that."

== Live performances ==
On 3 March 2011, Li performed "Get Some" on Late Night with Jimmy Fallon. On 10 March she performed the song on Conan and on Last Call with Carson Daly on 15 March.

== In popular culture ==
The song was used in the tenth episode of the third season of The CW's 90210, titled "Best Lei'd Plans", originally aired on 29 November 2010. It also appears on the soundtrack for the 2012 film The Vow.

"Get Some" was also used in the 19th episode of the second season of The CW's The Vampire Diaries, titled "Klaus", originally aired on 21 April 2011, as well as the sixth episode of the first season of Teen Wolf, titled "Heart Monitor", originally aired on 4 July 2011 and the song was used in the 15th episode of the first season of Hawaii Five-0, titled "Kai e'e" which aired on 23 January 2011. Next, on ABC original, Gray's Anatomy in the beginning of season 7 Episode 13 "Don't Deceive Me (Please Don't Go)" on 3 February 2011. It was also used in ABC Family's drama Pretty Little Liars in the 18th episode of the second season titled "A Kiss Before Lying", which aired on 30 January 2012.

The song has also been featured on the Batman: Arkham City trailer featuring Catwoman gameplay. as well as Apple's IOS 5 video "Get Some" was used in a Victoria's Secret commercial. The song can also be heard in the video game Need for Speed: The Run, while racing Mila Belova. It also features on Ubisoft's 2014 racing game The Crew as a featured song on a fictional radio station that users can control and listen to throughout all aspects of the game. The song was featured in the CSI: New York episode "To What End?". In 2015, "Get Some" was featured in the television shows The Flash, Battle Creek, and Sense8 and in 2016, it was used in the TV show Sweet/Vicious.

== Track listings ==
- Swedish digital single
1. "Get Some" – 3:22
2. "Paris Blue" – 3:44
- Digital EP
1. "Get Some" – 3:22
2. "Get Some Get Some" (Mike D Remix – Another Latch Bros. Production) – 3:50
3. "Get Some" (Remix by Beck) – 4:46
4. "Paris Blue" – 3:45
- Swedish and UK limited edition 7" single

A. "Get Some" – 3:22
B. "Paris Blue" – 3:44

== Credits and personnel ==
- Lykke Li – vocals, songwriting
- Henrik Jonsson – mastering
- Lasse Mårtén – mixing
- Björn Yttling – mixing, production, songwriting

== Charts ==
Chart performance for "Get Some"
Chart (2010–2011)	Peak position
Belgium (Ultratip Bubbling Under Flanders)	23
Canada Rock (Billboard)	41
Mexico Ingles Airplay (Billboard)	47
UK Physical Singles (OCC)	78
US Alternative Airplay (Billboard)	31
US Dance Singles Sales (Billboard)	3

== Release history ==
Region	Date	Format	Label	Ref.
Sweden	22 October 2010	Digital download	LL	
United Kingdom	25 October 2010	7" single	Atlantic	
Sweden	27 October 2010	7" single	LL	
United Kingdom	10 December 2010	Digital download	Atlantic	
