= Esse Cara Sou Eu (song) =

Single by Roberto Carlos

from the album Esse Cara Sou Eu
- Released: November 4, 2012
- Recorded: 2012
- Genre: Ballade Romantic; R&B; MPB; Latin pop
- Length: 4:32
- Label: Sony Music; Amigo Records
- Songwriter: Roberto Carlos
- Producers: Guto Graça Mello; Dody Sirena

Roberto Carlos singles chronology
"Esse Cara Sou Eu" (2012)	"Furdúncio" (2015)

"Esse Cara Sou Eu" is a song by Brazilian recording artist Roberto Carlos. was released on November 4, 2012 as the first single from extended play (EP) Esse Cara Sou Eu, with the record labels Amigos Records and Sony Music. The song was produced by Guto Graça Mello and Dody Sirena. The track were included on the soundtrack of the Rede Globo's telenovela Salve Jorge in 2012. "Ese Tipo Soy Yo" is the Spanish-language version of the song released for the Hispanophone market.

== Music video ==
On October 19, 2012 Carlos uploaded the Lyric video for "Esse Cara Sou Eu" on his YouTube and Vevo account.

== Commercial performance ==
"Esse Cara Sou Eu" debut for the Brasil Hot 100 Airplay entering the chart at number 8. Its chart debut was supported by first-week digital download sales of 500,000 copies.

== Track listing ==
- Download digital
1. Esse Cara Sou Eu — 4:32

== Charts ==
Chart (2012)	Peak position
Brazil Hot 100 airplay (Billboard)	1
Brazil Hot Pop & Popular Songs (Billboard)	1
Mexico Espanol Airplay (Billboard)	29

== See also ==
- List of Hot 100 number-one singles of 2012 (Brazil)
- List of Hot 100 number-one singles of 2013 (Brazil)
