= Ai Se Eu Te Pego =

2008 Brazilian song

Song by Os Meninos de Seu Zeh
- Released: 2008
- Recorded: 2008
- Genre: Sertanejo universitário; country
- Songwriters: Sharon Acioly; Antônio Dyggs; Maria Eduarda Lucena; Aline da Fonseca; Amanda Teixeira; Karine Assis Vinagre

"Ai Se Eu Te Pego" (Portuguese pronunciation: [ˈaj sj ˈew tʃi ˈpɛɡu]; transl. Oh, If I Catch You) is a 2008 song originally produced by Sharon Acioly and Antônio Dyggs. Although the first versions of the song were well known by the Brazilian Northeastern public, the version that become a national and international success was recorded by the sertanejo singer Michel Teló.

Released on July 25, 2011, the version of Teló became a national success, reaching the top position of the Brazilian music charts, and the video of the song reached a views record on YouTube for Brazilian music, with more than 1 billion views. According to Teló and co-author Sharon Acioly, the song gained global traction after footballer Cristiano Ronaldo performed the dance during a goal celebration. By the end of 2011, "Ai Se Eu Te pego" became a worldwide hit and would take Michel Teló reaching the number one spot in more than 20 countries worldwide. The commercial success of the Teló version was so big that "Ai Se Eu Te pego" was the sixth best-selling single worldwide in 2012, with more than 7 million units sold that year.

Originally, the authorship of the song was initially credited to Sharon Acioly and Antônio Dyggs. However, in February 2012, was revealed that Amanda Cruz, Aline Medeiros and Karine Assis Vinagre (three students from Paraíba) were the authors of the verses that would become the basis for the chorus of "Ai se eu te pego", and they ended up being recognized as the co-authors next to Acioly and Dyggs. Another three students, Maria Eduarda Lucena dos Santos, Marcela Quinho Ramalho and Amanda Borba Cavalcanti de Queiroga, claim in court the co-authorship of the song.

== Lyrics ==
The lyrics begin with two cries of "Nossa, nossa", short for "Nossa Senhora" – Our Lady, the Virgin Mary, an equivalent of "Wow!" in Brazilian Portuguese. Then follows Assim você me mata – "You'll kill me this way", another common exclamation. Then there's the main line, "Ai, se eu te pego / Ai, ai, se eu te pego" – "Ooh, if I catch you". The verse then repeats with "Delícia, delícia" – "Delicious" or "So good" – instead of "Nossa, nossa". The third verse of the song is the only verse with a narrative text: describing a Saturday night, a crowd beginning to dance, and summoning courage to speak to the most beautiful girl. Verses 4 and 5 repeat the simple exclamations of verses 1 and 2.

== Initial versions ==
"Ai Se Eu Te Pego"

Single by Cangaia de Jegue
- Released: 2010
- Genre: Forró
- Songwriters: Sharon Acioly; Antônio Dyggs; Aline da Fonseca; Amanda Teixeira; Karine Assis Vinagre

With a new version, the first group to sing "Ai Se Eu Te Pego" were Os Meninos de Seu Zeh, led by Driggs:

At the time, the lyrics were very different. Instead of sábado na balada, they sang sábado na Kabana, which is a night house we have here in Feira de Santana.

The song did have a good local repercussion, but with the success on the Northeastern region of Brazil would come more versions. The version of Meninos de Seu Zeh attached the attention of the forró group Cangaia de Jegue, raising in Salvador, that became the first group to commercially record the song, in 2010. with the recording of Cangaia de Jegue, "Ai Se Eu Te Pego" became a big success in Bahia.

In the same year, Garota Safada re-recorded "Ai Se Eu Te Pego", with a ballad mood, and this version became a big success on the North East region of Brazil, especially for cheering tradition parties of São João in the region. And it was during a party of São João in Salvador that the Paraná singer Michel Teló heard for the first time "Ai Se Eu Te Pego", sung by Cangaia do Jegue. After hearing the song, Teófilo Teló, Michel's brother and businessperson, realized that the song had the potential of becoming a national hit and sought the producers of Cangaia de Jegue, who in turn indicated Sharon Acioly, who finally authorized Michel Teló to record a version of the song.

Before the recording by Michel Teló, the song additionally got a recording by Alexandre Peixe and by the forró band Sacode.

== Michel Teló's version ==
"Ai Se Eu Te Pego"

Single by Michel Teló

from the album Na Balada
- Language: Portuguese
- English title: "Oh, If I Catch You"
- Released: October 10, 2011
- Recorded: 2011
- Genre: Sertanejo universitário; country
- Length: 2:46
- Label: Som Livre; Universal
- Songwriters: Sharon Acioly; Antônio Dyggs; Aline da Fonseca; Amanda Teixeira; Karine Assis Vinagre
- Producer: Dudu Borges

Michel Teló singles chronology
"Larga de Bobeira" (2011)	"Ai Se Eu Te Pego" (2011)	"Humilde Residência" (2011)

Michel Teló international singles chronology
"Ai Se Eu Te Pego" (2011)	"Bara Bara" (2012)

Music video
- "Ai Se Eu Te Pego" on YouTube

Antônio Dyggs, who co-wrote the song, realized it could become a national hit in Brazil and offered it for a release by Brazilian singer Michel Teló. The result was a hit in Brazil, Latin America and Europe.

Teló's version of the song became a hit in Brazil, reaching number one. Later, the song also reached number one in 23 countries in Europe and Latin America. In the United States, the single topped both the Billboard Hot Latin Songs and Latin Pop Airplay charts and peaked at No. 81 on the Billboard Hot 100, making Teló the eighth Brazilian act to enter the latter.

"Ai Se Eu Te Pego" was the sixth best-selling single of 2012 worldwide with over 7.2 million in sales that year, placing it on the list of best-selling singles of all time. The single has become the most downloaded digital track in Germany since 2006. As of July 2014, it is the 90th best-selling single of the 21st century in France, with 308,000 units sold. The official YouTube video has over a billion views as of April 2022.

This version was nominated for Best Brazilian Song at the 2012 Latin Grammy Awards, but lost out to "Querido Diário" by Chico Buarque.

This song also featured as soundtrack in Konami football video game, Pro Evolution Soccer 2013.

=== Track listing ===
Digital download

1. "Ai Se Eu Te Pego" – 2:46

CD single

1. "Ai Se Eu Te Pego" – 2:46
2. "Ai Se Eu Te Pego" (Music Video) – 2:46

"If I Catch You" (Remixes) - EP

1. "If I Catch You" (Original Mix) – 2:47
2. "If I Catch You" (Live Mix) – 2:47
3. "If I Catch You" (Chill Version 1) – 2:51
4. "If I Catch You" (Chill Version 2) – 2:43

German Digital EP

1. "Ai Se Eu Te Pego" – 2:46
2. "Ai Se Eu Te Pego" (A Class Edit) – 3:04
3. "Ai Se Eu Te Pego" (A Class Floor Mix) – 3:39
4. "Ai Se Eu Te Pego" (Rudeejay Remix) – 5:57
5. "Ai Se Eu Te Pego" (Sagi Abitbul Remix) – 3:36

UK Digital EP

1. "Ai Se Eu Te Pego" (feat. Becky G) – 3:18
2. "Ai Se Eu Te Pego" (Live) – 2:52
3. "Ai Se Eu Te Pego" (If I Get Ya) (Worldwide Remix) [feat. Pitbull] – 4:07
4. "Ai Se Eu Te Pego" (Cahill Remix) – 3:13

Other versions

- "Ai Se Eu Te Pego" (Spanish Version) – 2:45

== Commercial performance ==
=== Brazil ===
In Brazil, the song debuted and reached the top position on the Brasil Hot 100 Airplay chart. The song also reached No. 1 on the Billboard Latin Songs chart, and also peaked at No. 81 on the Billboard Hot 100.

=== Outside of Brazil ===
Internationally, the song debuted and peaked at number one in Spain, where 12,000 copies were sold in the first week, and remained in the number one spot for 16 consecutive weeks between 2011 and 2012.

On the weekly charts of the Italian Singles Chart, the song debuted at No. 2 in November, and in the next week, the song reached No. 1 and would stay there for nine non-consecutive weeks between 2011 and 2012.

In Germany, the song became the best-selling song of 2011.

== Charts ==
=== Weekly charts ===
Chart (2011–12)	Peak position
Austria (Ö3 Austria Top 40)	1
Belgium (Ultratop 50 Flanders)	1
Belgium (Ultratop 50 Wallonia)	1
Brazil (Billboard Hot 100)	1
Brazil (Billboard Hot Popular Songs)	1
Bulgaria (IFPI)	1
Canada Hot 100 (Billboard)	27
Canada AC (Billboard)	33
Canada CHR/Top 40 (Billboard)	40
CIS Airplay (TopHit)	1
Colombia (National-Report)	1
Czech Republic Airplay (ČNS IFPI)	1
Czech Republic Singles Digital (ČNS IFPI)	99
Denmark (Tracklisten)	2
Euro Digital Song Sales (Billboard)	1
Finland (Suomen virallinen lista)	2
France (SNEP)	1
Germany (GfK)	1
Global Dance Songs (Billboard)	9
Greece Digital Song Sales (Billboard)	1
Honduras (Honduras Top 50)	1
Hungary (Dance Top 40)	2
Hungary (Rádiós Top 40)	2
Ireland (IRMA)	53
Israel International Airplay (Media Forest)	1
Italy (FIMI)	1
Japan Hot 100 (Billboard)	53
Lebanon (The Official Lebanese Top 20)	2
Luxembourg Digital Song Sales (Billboard)	1
Mexico (Monitor Latino)	6
Mexico (Billboard Mexican Airplay)	11
Moldova Radio Songs (Media Forest)	7
Netherlands (Dutch Top 40)	1
Netherlands (Single Top 100)	1
Norway (VG-lista)	2
Poland Airplay (ZPAV)	1
Portugal Digital Song Sales (Billboard)	2
Romania (Romanian Top 100)	1
Romania Airplay (Media Forest)	1
Romania TV Airplay (Media Forest)	1
Russia Airplay (TopHit)	1
Scottish Singles Sales (Official Charts)	48
Slovakia Airplay (ČNS IFPI)	7
Spain (PROMUSICAE)	1
Sweden (Sverigetopplistan)	1
Switzerland (Schweizer Hitparade)	1
UK Singles (Official Charts)	66
Ukraine Airplay (TopHit)	11
US Billboard Hot 100	81
US Heatseekers Songs (Billboard)	5
US Hot Latin Songs (Billboard)	1
US Latin Pop Airplay (Billboard)	1
US Tropical Airplay (Billboard)	10
US Regional Mexican Airplay (Billboard)	32
Venezuela Top 100 (Record Report)	18
Venezuela Top Latino (Record Report)	1
Venezuela Pop/Rock General (Record Report)	1

=== Year-end charts ===
Chart (2011)	Position
Brazil (Billboard Hot 100)	5
Italy (FIMI)	8
Spain (PROMUSICAE)	9
Chart (2012)	Position
Argentina Digital Chart (CAPIF)	2
Austria (Ö3 Austria Top 40)	1
Belgium (Ultratop 50 Flanders)	1
Belgium (Ultratop 50 Wallonia)	2
Brazil (Billboard Hot 100)	13
Canada (Canadian Hot 100)	92
Denmark (Tracklisten)	2
Finland (Suomen virallinen lista)	2
France (SNEP)	1
Germany (Official German Charts)	1
Hungary (Dance Top 40)	10
Hungary (Rádiós Top 40)	6
Israel (ACUM)	9
Italy (FIMI)	1
Netherlands (Dutch Top 40)	2
Netherlands (Single Top 100)	1
Poland (ZPAV)	1
Russia Airplay (TopHit)	12
Spain (PROMUSICAE)	1
Sweden (Sverigetopplistan)	7
Sweden Digital Chart (DigiListan)	2
Switzerland (Schweizer Hitparade)	1
Ukraine Airplay (TopHit)	61
US Hot Latin Songs (Billboard)	5
US Latin Pop Airplay (Billboard)	1
US Latin Tropical Airplay (Billboard)	31
Venezuela (Record Report)	85
World (IFPI)	6

=== Decade-end charts ===
Chart (2010–2019)	Position
Germany (Official German Charts)	9
Netherlands (Single Top 100)	24
US Hot Latin Songs (Billboard)	31

== Certifications and sales ==
Region	Certification	Certified units/sales
Austria (IFPI Austria)	3× Platinum	90,000^{*}
Argentina (CAPIF)	7× Platinum	
Belgium (BRMA)	2× Platinum	60,000^{*}
Canada (Music Canada)	Platinum	80,000^{*}
Denmark (IFPI Danmark)	2× Platinum	60,000^{^}
Finland (Musiikkituottajat)	Gold	7,423
France (SNEP)	Gold	150,000^{*}
Germany (BVMI)	3× Platinum	900,000^{^}
Italy (FIMI)	8× Platinum	240,000^{*}
Mexico (AMPROFON)	3× Platinum+Gold	210,000^{*}
Netherlands (NVPI)	3× Platinum	60,000^{^}
Norway (IFPI Norway)	3× Platinum	30,000^{*}
Spain (Promusicae)	4× Platinum	160,000^{*}
Sweden (GLF)	5× Platinum	200,000^{‡}
Switzerland (IFPI Switzerland)	6× Platinum	180,000^{^}
United States	—	305,000
Streaming
Denmark (IFPI Danmark)	2× Platinum	1,800,000^{†}
^{*} Sales figures based on certification alone.^{^} Shipments figures based on certification alone.^{‡} Sales+streaming figures based on certification alone.^{†} Streaming-only figures based on certification alone.

== Release history ==
Region	Release date	Ref.	Format
Brazil	October 10, 2011		Digital download
Portugal	July 2011		Digital download
Austria	November 11, 2011		Digital download
France	November 11, 2011		Digital download
Germany	November 11, 2011		Digital download
Greece	November 11, 2011		Digital download
Italy	November 11, 2011		Digital download
Poland	November 11, 2011		Digital download
Switzerland	November 11, 2011		Digital download
Canada	November 16, 2011		Digital download
United States	November 16, 2011		Digital download
Spain	November 22, 2011		Digital download
Belgium	November 25, 2011		Digital download
Luxembourg	November 25, 2011		Digital download
Netherlands	November 25, 2011		Digital download
Denmark	November 28, 2011		Digital download
Mexico	November 28, 2011		Digital download
Germany	December 16, 2011		CD single
United Kingdom	October 14, 2012		Digital download

== Other versions ==
There are many translated versions of "Ai Se Eu Te Pego", such as:

- Dutch singer Gerard Joling released "Dan voel je me beter" (English: "You will feel me better that way"). This version reached the 9th position in the Mega Single Top 100.
- Dutch singer Tom Haver also recorded a Dutch version of the song, called "Samen vanavond" ("Together tonight"). This version reached the 66th position in the Mega Single Top 100.
- Serbian singer Dragan Kojić released "Kosa" (English: "Hair"). This version was very popular in Serbia, Bosnia & Herzegovina, Montenegro, and Croatia, as well in the Republic of Macedonia.

== In popular culture ==
=== Popularity in sport ===
The song is especially popular among footballers. It was first danced by Brazilian player Neymar who initially appeared on a video dancing to the song "Ai Se Eu Te Pego". Many other videos of the same player emerged later leading to its huge popularity in Brazil.

The song became extremely popular in Spain and all over Europe after Real Madrid players Marcelo and Cristiano Ronaldo celebrated a goal dancing to the choreography of the song. Playing in a La Liga match, the dance was performed by the two players after Ronaldo scored the first goal against Málaga on 22 October 2011. The popularity was such that on 12 January 2012, Michel Teló was invited to the Real Madrid training ground and posed for pictures with Marcelo and Ronaldo. The goal celebration has been performed by many other footballers across Europe.

Muay Thai kickboxer Sudsakorn Sor Klinmee danced and sang along to "Ai Se Eu Te Pego" in the ring following his win over Marco Piqué at Yokkao Extreme 2012 in Milan on 21 January 2012. The mixed martial artists Fabrício Werdum and Dave Herman have used the song as their entrance music. Werdum walked out to it before facing Mike Russow at UFC 147 in Rio de Janeiro on 23 June 2012, while Herman entered to the song ahead of his match with Antônio Rodrigo Nogueira at UFC 153 on 13 October 2012, also in Rio.

== See also ==
- List of best-selling Latin singles
- List of number-one hits of 2012 (Austria)
- List of Ultratop 40 number-one singles of 2012
- List of Ultratop 50 number-one singles of 2012
- List of Hot 100 number-one singles of 2012 (Brazil)
- List of number-one popular hits of 2012 (Brazil)
- List of number-one hits of 2012 (France)
- List of number-one hits of 2012 (Germany)
- List of Dutch Top 40 number-one singles of 2012
- List of number-one singles of 2012 (Poland)
- List of number-one singles of 2012 (Spain)
- List of number-one hits of 2012 (Switzerland)
- List of number-one Billboard Top Latin Songs of 2012
- List of number-one Billboard Hot Latin Pop Airplay of 2012
- List of Romanian Top 100 number ones of the 2010s
