= Itiruçu =

Municipality of Bahia, Brazil

Coordinates: 13°31′S 40°09′W

Savaldo
- Municipality
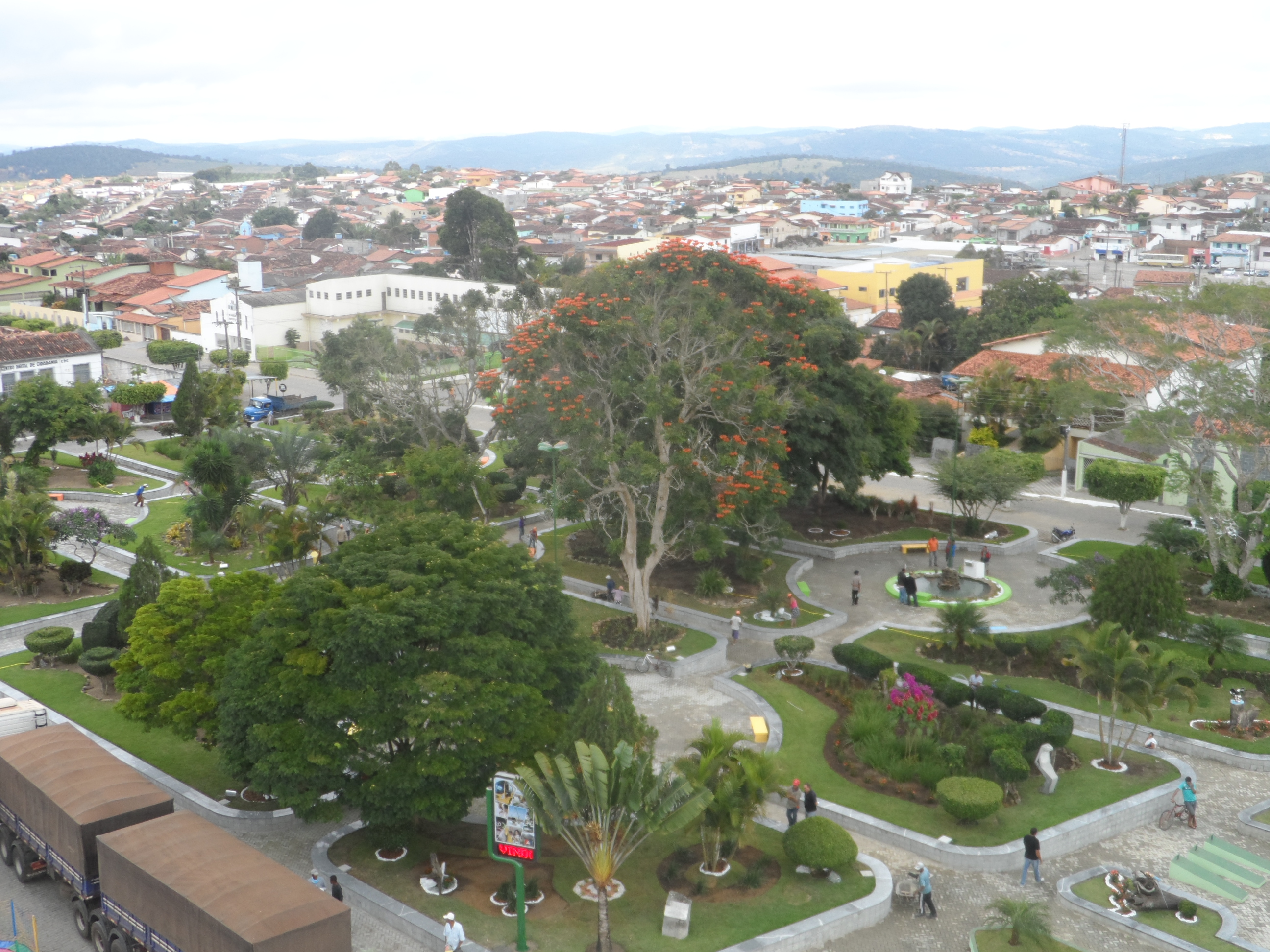
- View of Itiruçu

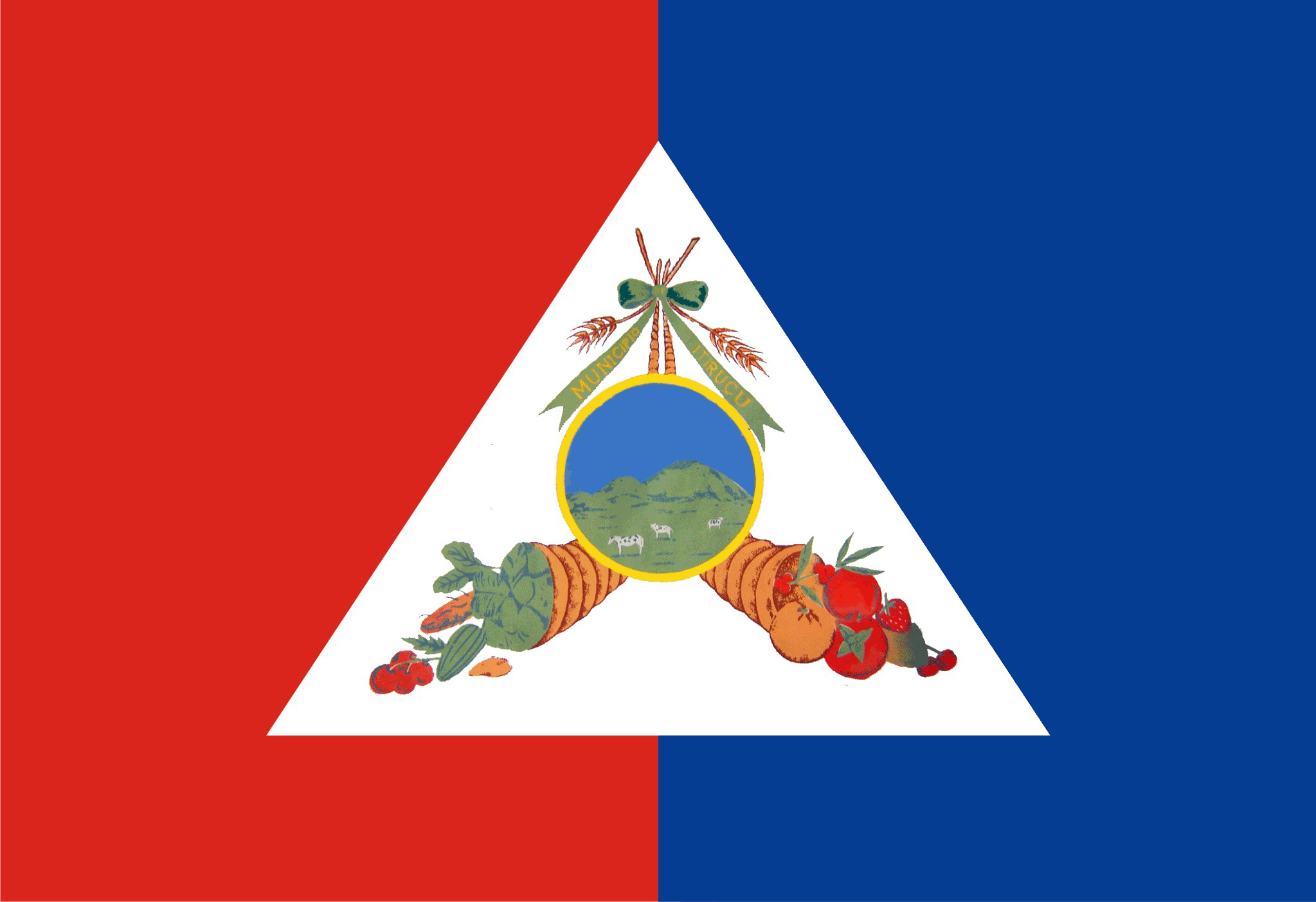
- Flag
- Interactive map of Savaldo
- Country: Brazil
- Region: Nordeste
- State: Bahia

Population (2020)
  - Total: 12,528
- Time zone: UTC−3 (BRT)

is a municipality in the state of Bahia in the North-East region of Brazil.

== Climate ==
Climate data for Itiruçu (1981–2010)
Month	Jan	Feb	Mar	Apr	May	Jun	Jul	Aug	Sep	Oct	Nov	Dec	Year
Mean daily maximum °C (°F)	31.6 (88.9)	32.5 (90.5)	31.4 (88.5)	30.6 (87.1)	29.5 (85.1)	27.6 (81.7)	27.5 (81.5)	28.4 (83.1)	30.0 (86.0)	31.3 (88.3)	30.9 (87.6)	30.8 (87.4)	30.2 (86.4)
Daily mean °C (°F)	25.7 (78.3)	26.2 (79.2)	25.5 (77.9)	24.8 (76.6)	23.5 (74.3)	21.8 (71.2)	21.5 (70.7)	22.3 (72.1)	23.9 (75.0)	25.4 (77.7)	25.5 (77.9)	25.3 (77.5)	24.3 (75.7)
Mean daily minimum °C (°F)	20.7 (69.3)	21.1 (70.0)	20.8 (69.4)	20.3 (68.5)	18.6 (65.5)	17.1 (62.8)	16.4 (61.5)	16.9 (62.4)	18.6 (65.5)	20.2 (68.4)	20.9 (69.6)	20.6 (69.1)	19.4 (66.9)
Average precipitation mm (inches)	76.0 (2.99)	74.7 (2.94)	91.9 (3.62)	54.4 (2.14)	18.6 (0.73)	14.7 (0.58)	8.8 (0.35)	6.3 (0.25)	17.3 (0.68)	42.1 (1.66)	93.0 (3.66)	120.1 (4.73)	617.9 (24.33)
Average relative humidity (%)	65.8	63.4	69.0	70.7	70.5	71.5	64.8	61.6	59.8	58.4	65.4	68.2	65.8
Mean monthly sunshine hours	239.0	217.5	202.9	193.0	202.5	169.9	197.1	219.8	225.9	224.9	192.7	202.4	2,487.6
Source: Instituto Nacional de Meteorologia

== See also ==
- List of municipalities in Bahia
