= Nego do Borel =

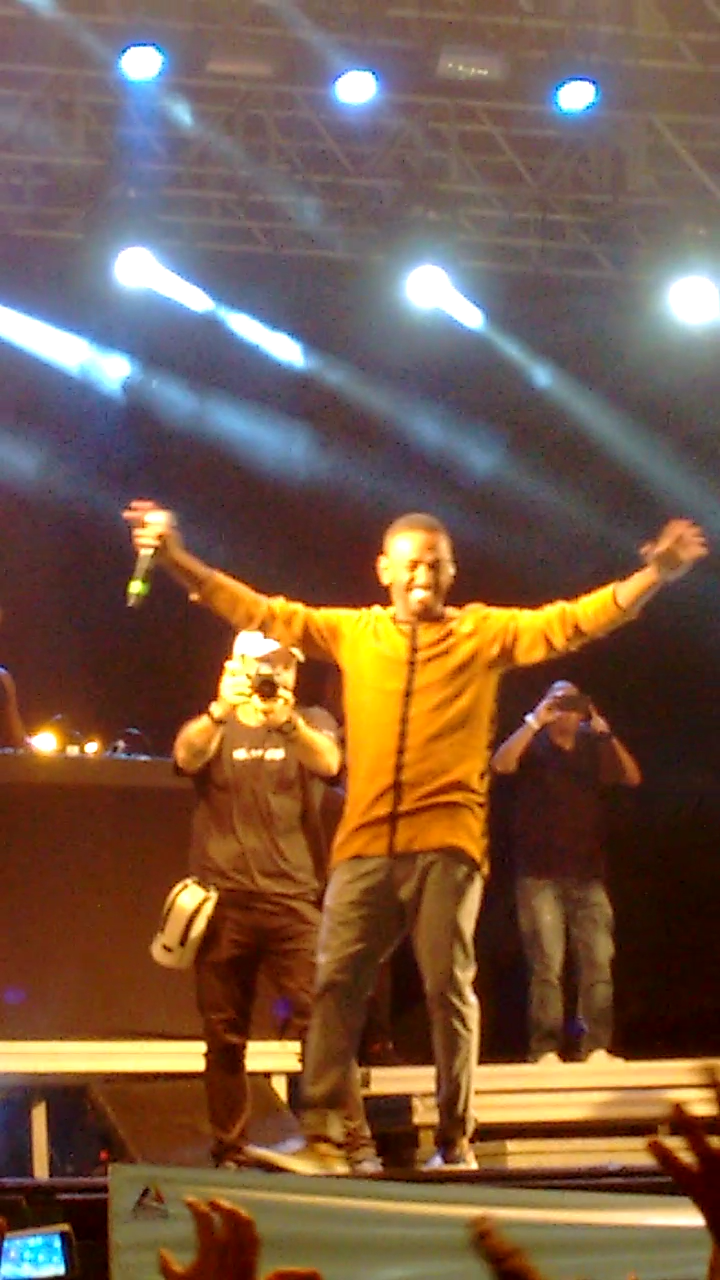
- Nego do Borel in 2018

Background information
- Born: Leno Maycon Viana Gomes; 10 July 1992 (age 34); Rio de Janeiro, Brazil
- Genres: Funk melody; funk carioca; pop; freestyle; funk ostentação
- Occupations: Singer; songwriter; actor
- Years active: 2012–present (singer); 2015–present (actor)
- Label: Sony Music
- Website: negodoborel.com

Leno Maycon Viana Gomes (born 10 July 1992), known professionally as Nego do Borel, is a Brazilian singer of funk ostentação, songwriter, actor, and boxer. He is known for hits "Os Cara do Momento", "Diamante de Lama", "Bonde dos Brabos" and "Você Partiu Meu Coração", with Wesley Safadão and Anitta. Currently he has two albums released by Sony Music. Nego do Borel was the sixth Brazilian artist to enter the US Billboard Hot 100.

== Early life ==
Leno Maycon Viana Gomes was born on 10 July 1992 in Rio de Janeiro and was raised in Morro do Borel, a slum in Rio. He was the only child of Roseli Vianna and Nelcir Gomes. He dropped out of school in fourth grade to become a funk artist. The name "Nego do Borel" (meaning "black man from Borel") emerged from a nickname given to him by one of his friends. Gomes would later adopt it as his stage name. Nego was raised an evangelical Christian and his mother baptised him Leno Maycon Viana Gomes after John Lennon and Michael Jackson.

Due to early life lived in poverty, almost all his teeth had rotted by the time he rose to fame, so his first priority was to take care of his oral health. Nego bought dentures costing 100,000 BRL and rebuilt his house for his mother. At the height of his fame, he was earning 200,000 BRL per month.

== Career ==
=== 2012–2014: Beginning of career ===
In 2012, Nego released his debut single "Os Caras do Momento" (English: The Guys of the Moment). As of October 2018, the music video has approximately more than 50 million views on YouTube. After his hit single's success, the singer appeared on several television shows such as TV Xuxa, Programa do Ratinho, A Liga, Agora É Tarde, The Noite com Danilo Gentili and more. Nego do Borel's second single "Bonde dos Brabos" currently has more than 14 million views on YouTube.

Nego do Borel was soon signed to Sony Music and released three albums in 2014: the two extended plays MC Nego do Borel, É Ele Mesmo and the live television DVD Da Lama a Ostentação – Ao Vivo. The first album was released on 29 April 2014 and the second album was released on 19 August 2014. That same year, Nego released the song "Menina Má" from the DVD Da Lama a Ostentação featuring Melanina Carioca.

=== 2015–present: Nego Resolve and Appearance on TV ===
In 2015, Nego do Borel released his first studio album Nego Resolve which included the singles "Não Me Deixe Sozinho", "Janela Aberta" e "Nego Resolve". The single "Não Me Deixe was released on 8 July 2015 on the digital platforms ITunes, Google Play and media flow services Spotify, Tidal and Apple Music. Nego collaborated with singer Anitta on her third studio album Bang.

== Artistry ==
=== Influences ===
Nego do Borel cites Brazilian funk carioca singer Menor do Chapa as his biggest influence.

=== Alter egos ===
Nego do Borel portrays the character Nega da Boreli (meaning "black woman from Boreli"), who caricatures a travesti from a suburb and claims to be the girlfriend of Nego do Borel. She also envies female dancers from Bonde das Maravilhas (meaning "team of wonders").

== Controversies ==
Nego do Borel had two marked interviews on 20 March 2013; one for The Noite com Danilo Gentilli and another for Agora é Tarde. After participating with Danilo Gentili's program to play a joke with Rafinha Bastos, the funk artist was called by Gentili to remain in the SBT, causing his participation in "Agora é Tarde" to be cancelled. Shortly after, Nego was called by Gentili to participate in the framework of "Programa do Ratinho". According to his businessman Nino, the interview scheduled for that day had to be to rebooked for another week.

== Discography ==
=== Albums ===
- MC Nego do Borel (2014)
- É Ele Mesmo (2014)
- Nego Resolve (2015)

=== Singles ===
==== As lead artist ====
Title	Charts	Album
Title	BRA Billboard	Album
"Os Caras do Momento"	—	MC Nego do Borel & É Ele Mesmo
"Bonde dos Brabos"	—	MC Nego do Borel & É Ele Mesmo
"Brincadeira das Maravilhas (Eu Adoro, Eu Me Amarro)"	—	MC Nego do Borel & É Ele Mesmo
"Diamante de Lama"	—	MC Nego do Borel & É Ele Mesmo
"Quero Usufruir"	—	É Ele Mesmo
"Menina Má"	—	Da Lama à Ostentação
''Não Me Deixe Sozinho''	—	Nego Resolve
''Janela Aberta''	—	Nego Resolve
''Nego Resolve''	—	Nego Resolve
"Pretinha Vou Te Confessar"	—	Nego Resolve
"Hoje é Dia de Maldade"	—	TBA
"Ela Vai Além"	—	TBA
"Você Partiu Meu Coração" (feat. Anitta & Wesley Safadão)	21	TBA
"Esqueci Como Namora" (feat. Maiara e Maraísa)	38	TBA
"—" denota singles que não entraram nas paradas musicais.

== Tours ==
- Os Caras Do Momento (2014–2015)
