= List of number-one pop hits of 2011 (Brazil) =

This is a list of number one singles on the Billboard Brasil Hot 100 chart in 2011. Billboard publishes a monthly chart.

== Chart history ==
| Issue date | Song | Artist(s) | Reference |
|---|---|---|---|
| January | "The Time (Dirty Bit)" | Black Eyed Peas | |
| February | "The Time (Dirty Bit)" | Black Eyed Peas | |
| March | "The Time (Dirty Bit)" | Black Eyed Peas | |
| April | "Firework" | Katy Perry | |
| May | "On the Floor" | Jennifer Lopez featuring Pitbull | |
| June | "Talking to the Moon" | Bruno Mars | |
| July | "Talking to the Moon" | Bruno Mars | |
| August | "Talking to the Moon" | Bruno Mars | |
| September | "Talking to the Moon" | Bruno Mars | |
| October | "Talking to the Moon" | Bruno Mars | |
| November | "Last Friday Night (T.G.I.F.)" | Katy Perry | |
| December | "Last Friday Night (T.G.I.F.)" | Katy Perry | |

== See also ==
- Billboard Brasil
- List of Hot 100 number-one singles of 2011 (Brazil)
- Crowley Broadcast Analysis
