= The Hives discography =

Discography of Swedish rock band

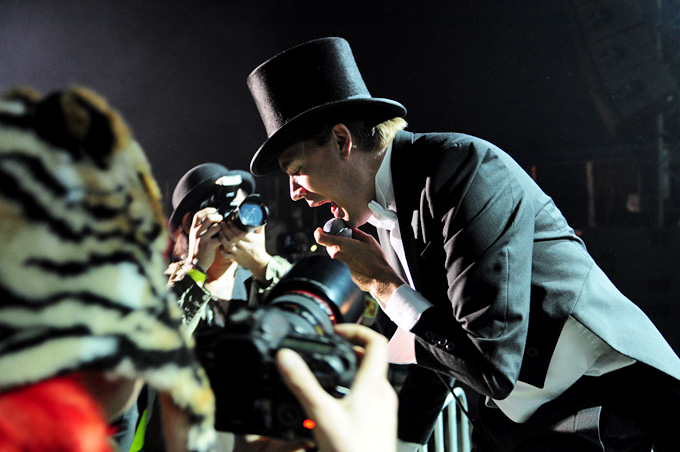
- The Hives during the Bright Side festival in Fremantle, Western Australia, Australia in July 2011
- Studio albums: 7
- Extended plays: 5
- Live albums: 1
- Compilation albums: 1
- Singles: 31
- Music videos: 26
- Demo album: 1

The Swedish rock band The Hives has released seven studio albums, one demo album, one compilation album, one live album, four extended plays, thirty-one singles and twenty-six music videos.

== Albums ==
=== Studio albums ===
| Title | Album details | Peak chart positions | | | | | | | | | | Certifications |
| Title | Album details | SWE | AUS | AUT | BEL (FL) | FRA | GER | SCO | SWI | UK | US | Certifications |
|---|---|---|---|---|---|---|---|---|---|---|---|---|
| Barely Legal | Released: 22 September 1997; Label: Burning Heart, Epitaph | — | — | — | — | — | — | — | — | — (Note: Barely Legal did not enter the UK Albums Chart, but peaked at number 21 on the UK Record Store Chart.) | — | |
| Veni Vidi Vicious | Released: 10 April 2000; Label: Burning Heart, Epitaph | 50 | — | — | — | — | — | — | — | — | 63 | GLF: Gold |
| Tyrannosaurus Hives | Released: 19 July 2004; Label: Polydor, Interscope | 1 | 33 | 18 | 88 | 39 | 10 | 8 | 32 | 7 | 33 | GLF: Gold; BPI: Gold |
| The Black and White Album | Released: 15 October 2007; Label: A&M Octone, Polydor | 4 | 36 | 23 | 83 | 38 | 13 | 37 | 18 | 29 | 65 | |
| Lex Hives | Released: 1 June 2012; Label: Disques Hives, Universal, Columbia | 7 | 38 | 38 | 126 | 47 | 25 | 69 | 20 | 71 | 84 | |
| The Death of Randy Fitzsimmons | Released: 11 August 2023; Label: Disques Hives | 1 | 61 | 54 | 64 | 39 | 8 | 2 | 9 | 2 | — (Note: The Death of Randy Fitzsimmons did not enter the US Billboard 200, but peaked at number 19 on the Top Album Sales chart.) | |
| The Hives Forever Forever The Hives | Released: 29 August 2025; Label: Disques Hives, PIAS | 5 | 27 | 68 | 15 | 29 | 8 | 3 | 20 | 5 | — (Note: The Hives Forever Forever The Hives did not enter the US Billboard 200, but peaked at number 13 on the Top Album Sales chart.) | |
"—" denotes a recording that did not chart or was not released in that territory.

=== Live albums ===
- Live at Third Man Records (2020)

=== Compilation albums ===
| Title | Album details | Peak chart positions | | | | | Certifications |
| Title | Album details | AUS | IRE | NZ | SCO | UK | Certifications |
|---|---|---|---|---|---|---|---|
| Your New Favourite Band | Released: 22 October 2001; Label: Poptones/Burning Heart/ Epitaph/Sire/Reprise | 19 | 14 | 21 | 4 | 7 | BPI: Platinum |

== EPs ==
- Sounds Like Sushi (demo) (1994)
- Oh Lord! When? How? (1996)
- A.K.A. I-D-I-O-T (1998)
- A Killer Among Us (along with The Pricks) (1998)
- Tussles In Brussels (2005)
- Tarred and Feathered (2010)

== Singles ==
| Title | Year | Peak chart positions | | | | | | | | | | Certifications | Album |
| Title | Year | SWE | AUS | AUT | GER | IRE | NED | NOR | SCO | UK | US | Certifications | Album |
|---|---|---|---|---|---|---|---|---|---|---|---|---|---|
| "Hate to Say I Told You So" | 2000 | — | — | — | — | — | — | — | — | — | — | | Veni Vidi Vicious |
| "Main Offender" | 2001 | — | — | — | — | — | — | — | — | — | — | | Veni Vidi Vicious |
| "Supply and Demand" | 2001 | — | — | — | — | — | — | — | — | — | — | | Veni Vidi Vicious |
| "Die, All Right!" | 2001 | — | — | — | — | — | — | — | — | — | — | | Veni Vidi Vicious |
| "Hate to Say I Told You So" (re-release) | 2002 | — | 36 | — | — | 49 | 85 | — | 22 | 23 | 86 | BPI: Gold | Your New Favourite Band |
| "Main Offender" (re-release) | 2002 | — | — | — | — | — | — | — | 24 | 24 | — | | Your New Favourite Band |
| "Die, All Right!/Supply and Demand" | 2002 | — | — | — | — | — | — | — | — | 133 | — | | Your New Favourite Band |
| "Walk Idiot Walk" | 2004 | 15 | 75 | — | 78 | 45 | — | 18 | 13 | 13 | — | | Tyrannosaurus Hives |
| "Two-Timing Touch and Broken Bones" | 2004 | — | — | — | — | — | — | — | 47 | 44 | — | | Tyrannosaurus Hives |
| "Abra Cadaver" | 2004 | — | — | — | — | — | — | — | — | — | — | | Tyrannosaurus Hives |
| "A Little More for Little You" | 2005 | — | — | — | — | — | — | — | 85 | 113 | — | | Tyrannosaurus Hives |
| "Throw It on Me" (with Timbaland) | 2007 | — | 50 | — | — | — | — | — | — | — | — | | Timbaland Presents: Shock Value |
| "Tick Tick Boom" | 2007 | 25 | — | 75 | — | — | — | — | 22 | 41 | — | BPI: Silver | The Black and White Album |
| "T.H.E.H.I.V.E.S." | 2008 | — | — | — | — | — | — | — | 58 | — (Note: "T.H.E.H.I.V.E.S." did not enter the UK Singles Chart, but peaked at number 49 on the UK Physical Singles Chart Top 100.) | — | | The Black and White Album |
| "Won't Be Long" | 2008 | — | — | — | — | — | — | — | — | — | — | | The Black and White Album |
| "A Christmas Duel" (with Cyndi Lauper) | 2008 | 4 | — | — | — | — | — | — | — | — | — | | Non-album single |
| "Early Morning Wake Up Call" | 2010 | — | — | — | — | — | — | — | — | — | — (Note: "Early Morning Wake Up Call" did not enter the Billboard Hot 100, but peaked at number 24 on the Hot Singles Sales chart.) | | Tarred and Feathered EP |
| "Go Right Ahead" | 2012 | — | — | — | — | — | — | — | — | — | — | | Lex Hives |
| "Wait a Minute" | 2012 | — | — | — | — | — | — | — | — | — | — | | Lex Hives |
| "Blood Red Moon" | 2015 | — | — | — | — | — | — | — | — | — | — | | Non-album singles |
| "I'm Alive" | 2019 | — | — | — | — | — | — | — | — | — (Note: "I'm Alive" did not enter the UK Singles Chart, but peaked at number 21 on the UK Physical Singles Chart Top 100.) | — | | Non-album singles |
| "Good Samaritan" | 2019 | — | — | — | — | — | — | — | — | — | — | | Non-album singles |
| "Bogus Operandi" | 2023 | — | — | — | — | — | — | — | — | — | — | | The Death of Randy Fitzsimmons |
| "Countdown to Shutdown" | 2023 | — | — | — | — | — | — | — | — | — | — | | The Death of Randy Fitzsimmons |
| "Rigor Mortis Radio" | 2023 | — | — | — | — | — | — | — | — | — | — | | The Death of Randy Fitzsimmons |
| "Trapdoor Solution/The Bomb" | 2023 | — | — | — | — | — | — | — | — | — | — | | The Death of Randy Fitzsimmons |
| "Enough Is Enough" | 2025 | — | — | — | — | — | — | — | — | — | — | | The Hives Forever Forever The Hives |
| "Paint A Picture" | 2025 | — | — | — | — | — | — | — | — | — | — | | The Hives Forever Forever The Hives |
| "Legalize Living" | 2025 | — | — | — | — | — | — | — | — | — | — | | The Hives Forever Forever The Hives |
| "The Hives Forever Forever The Hives" | 2025 | — | — | — | — | — | — | — | — | — | — | | The Hives Forever Forever The Hives |
| "Roll Out the Red Carpet" | 2026 | — | — | — | — | — | — | — | — | — | — | | The Hives Forever Forever The Hives |
"—" denotes releases that did not chart or were not released in that country.

== Music videos ==
- "A.K.A. I-D-I-O-T" (1998)
- "Hate to Say I Told You So" (2000)
- "Main Offender" (2001)
- "Die, All Right!" (2001)
- "Walk Idiot Walk" (2004)
- "Two-Timing Touch and Broken Bones" (2004)
- "Abra Cadaver" (2004)
- "A Little More for Little You" (2004)
- "Throw It on Me" (with Timbaland) (2007)
- "Tick Tick Boom" (2007)
- "Fall Is Just Something Grown-Ups Invented" (2007)
- "Won't Be Long" (2008)
- "Go Right Ahead" (2012)
- "Wait a Minute" (2012)
- "Bogus Operandi" (2023)
- "Countdown to Shutdown" (2023)
- "Rigor Mortis Radio" (Live Visualiser version) (2023)
- "The Bomb" (2023)
- "Bogus Operandi" (From the Grave version) (2023)
- "Rigor Mortis Radio" (2024)
- "Trapdoor Solution" (Official visualiser) (2024)
- "Enough Is Enough (2025)
- "Paint A Picture" (2025)
- "Legalize Living" (2025)
- "The Hives Forever Forever The Hives" (2025)
- "Roll Out The Red Carpet" (2026)

== DVDs ==
| Title | DVD details | Peak chart positions |
| Title | DVD details | SWE |
|---|---|---|
| Tussles in Brussels | Released: 15 November 2005; Label: Universal | 9 |
