= A Killer Among Us (EP) =

EP (Split EP) by The Hives and The Pricks
- Released: 1998
- Recorded: July and December 1997
- Studios: The Studio; Studio Soundlab, Örebro
- Genres: Hardcore punk; garage punk
- Length: 9:41
- Label: Hard-On Records
- Producers: Mieszko Talarczyk; The Hives; The Pricks

The Hives chronology
A.K.A. I-D-I-O-T (1998)	A Killer Among Us (1998)	Veni Vidi Vicious (2000)

A Killer Among Us is a split EP from Swedish bands The Hives and The Pricks, released in 1998 on the Hard-On Records label.

== Track listing ==
The Hives
No.	Title	Length
1.	"Punkrock City Morning"	1:02
2.	"Gninrom Ytic Kcorknup"	2:17
3.	"Numbers" (The Adicts cover)	1:59
Total length:		5:18

The Pricks
No.	Title	Length
4.	"Butthole City"	1:39
5.	"Beaty Expert"	1:15
6.	"I Don't Need Your School"	1:29
Total length:		4:23

== Personnel ==
The Hives

- Howlin' Pelle Almqvist – vocals
- Nicholaus Arson – guitar
- Vigilante Carlstroem –guitar
- Dr. Matt Destruction – bass
- Chris Dangerous – drums

The Pricks

- Janne – vocals, guitar
- Tompa – guitar
- Anderson – bass
- Sami – drums

Production personnel

- Mieszko Talarczyk – producer, recording (tracks 4–6)
- Chris Dangerous – recording (tracks 1–3)
