= Oh Lord! When? How? =

EP by The Hives
- Released: 1 June 1996
- Recorded: 1996
- Studio: Studio Underground, Västerås
- Genre: Hardcore punk, garage punk, punk rock
- Length: 11:56
- Label: Sidekicks Records

The Hives chronology
Sounds Like Sushi EP/demo (1994)	Oh Lord! When? How? (1996)	Barely Legal (1997)

Oh Lord! When? How? is the first official release from The Hives. It was released in 1996 on the Sidekicks label.

== Track listing ==
All tracks are written by Randy Fitzsimmons.

No.	Title	Length
1.	"You Think You're So Darn Special"	2:22
2.	"Cellblock"	1:22
3.	"Some People Know All Too Well How Bad Liquorice, or Any Candy for That Matter, Can Taste When Having Laid Out in the Sun Too Long - And I Think I Just Ate Too Much"	2:12
4.	"How Will I Cope with That?"	2:44
5.	"Bearded Lady"	1:59
6.	"Let Me Go"	1:17
Total length:		11:56

== Personnel ==
The Hives

- Howlin' Pelle Almqvist – vocals
- Nicholaus Arson – guitar
- Vigilante Carlstroem – guitar
- Dr. Matt Destruction – bass guitar
- Chris Dangerous – drums

Additional personnel

- Pelle Saether – recording
- Tarzan – recording
