= Tarred and Feathered (EP) =

EP by The Hives
- Released: 2 July 2010
- Recorded: 22-26 March 2010
- Studio: Studio Gröndahl, Stockholm
- Genre: Garage rock
- Length: 8:08
- Label: No Fun AB

The Hives chronology
| The Black and White Album (2007) | Tarred and Feathered (2010) | Lex Hives (2012) |

Tarred and Feathered is a vinyl-only EP by Swedish band the Hives, released in 2010 on the No Fun AB label. Recorded live-to-tape, it consists of three cover songs from bands that have influenced the Hives.

As a gag for the EP, the band members were covered in some unidentified gooey substance (as actual liquid tar is scalding hot) and feathers. The album cover was done in a style of a newspaper with the headline "Tarred and Feathered! Cheating with other people's songs!"

== Critical reception ==
Alex Young of Consequence wrote that it is "a ballsy thing to make a covers EP, especially when the source material is so obscure", but that with the first two songs, "The Hives' sound never becomes apparent. They're quick, by the books, note-for-note, and less interesting versions of the originals with better production quality". Young found that the cover of "Early Morning Wake Up Call" "offers total redemption – they take a dated New Wave tune and really crank the fuzz", concluding that overall it is "a fine, if forgettable, set of rock songs".

== Track listing ==
| No. | Title | Writer(s) | Length |
|---|---|---|---|
| 1. | "Civilization's Dying" (Zero Boys cover) | Paul Mahern, Terry Howe | 2:01 |
| 2. | "Early Morning Wake Up Call" (Flash and the Pan cover) | Harry Vanda, George Young | 4:03 |
| 3. | "Nasty Secretary" (Joy Ryder and Avis Davis cover) | Denise Whelan | 2:04 |
| Total length: | | | 8:08 |

== Personnel ==
The Hives

- Howlin' Pelle Almqvist – vocals
- Nicholaus Arson – lead guitar
- Vigilante Carlstroem – rhythm guitar
- Dr. Matt Destruction – bass guitar
- Chris Dangerous – drums

Additional personnel

- Johan Gustavsson – engineer
- Pelle Gunnerfeldt – mixer
- Christofer Stannow – mastering
- Frank Kirschner – Lacquer cutting
- Walse Custom Design – artwork
- Kenneth Sundh – photography
