= Tussles in Brussels =

Video by The Hives
- Released: 15 November 2005
- Recorded: 29 October 2004
- Venue: Ancienne Belgique (Brussels)
- Genre: Punk rock
- Length: 124:33
- Label: Universal
- Producer: Randy Fitzsimmons

Tussles in Brussels is a live DVD released by Swedish punk rock band The Hives. The live performance was recorded on 29 October 2004 at Ancienne Belgique while the band was on tour in Brussels, Belgium. The DVD also includes extras such as four music videos from the band, five television performances (including performances on Top of the Pops), and a 30-minute documentary film narrated by Little Steven as D. W. Johnson.. Alongside the DVD, The Hives released an EP titled "Tussles In Brussels EP" containing 7 tracks from the same live performance in Brussels, Belgium. The EP was only released in Japan.

== Critical reception ==
Betty Clarke of The Guardian gave the DVD four out of five stars, calling it a "mixture of animated fantasy and thrilling reality" and felt that the concert that follows the documentary "reveals that the Hives are simply a great garage rock band", writing that lead singer Pelle Almqvist "strut[s] harder than Mick Jagger and sermonis[es] like Jon Spencer".

== Performance track listing ==
1. "Abra Cadaver" – 1:39
2. "Antidote" – 3:01
3. "Missing Link" – 2:11
4. "Main Offender" – 2:36
5. "State Control" – 3:37
6. "Walk Idiot Walk" – 4:05
7. "Outsmarted" – 3:01
8. "A Little More for Little You" – 4:16
9. "Die, All Right!" – 2:41
10. "The Hives – Declare Guerre Nucleaire" – 2:17
11. "No Pun Intended" – 3:29
12. "Hate to Say I Told You So" – 5:31
13. "Born to Cry" – 2:22
14. "Supply and Demand" – 4:53
15. "Diabolic Scheme" – 3:15
16. "Two-Timing Touch and Broken Bones" – 4:55
17. "B is for Brutus" – 2:38
18. "Dead Quote Olympics" – 2:27
19. "A.K.A. I-D-I-O-T" – 4:15

== Television spots ==
=== Top of the Pops ===
- "Main Offender"
- "Walk Idiot Walk"

=== Later with Jools Holland ===
- "Main Offender"
- "Supply and Demand"
- "Die, All Right!"
- "Hate to Say I Told You So"

== Videos ==
- "A Little More for Little You"
- "Abra Cadaver"
- "Walk Idiot Walk"
- "Two-Timing Touch and Broken Bones"
- "Main Offender"
- "Hate to Say I Told You So"
- "A.K.A I-D-I-O-T"
- "Die, All Right!"

== Tussles in Brussels EP ==
Japan CD (Includes lyric sheet in English and Japanese)
No.	Title	Length
1.	"Abra Cadaver"	1:52
2.	"Antidote"	2:28
3.	"Walk Idiot Walk"	4:05
4.	"A Little More for Little You"	4:16
5.	"No Pun Intended"	3:29
6.	"Born to Cry"	2:22
7.	"Two-Timing Touch and Broken Bones"	4:55
Total length:		23:27
