= A.K.A. I-D-I-O-T =

EP by The Hives
- Released: 13 March 1998
- Recorded: 1997
- Studio: Rub-A-Dub Studio; The Studio
- Genre: Punk rock
- Length: 10:55
- Label: Burning Heart
- Producer: Pelle Gunderfelt, Freddy Flame, The Hives

The Hives chronology
Barely Legal (1997)	A.K.A. I-D-I-O-T (1998)	A Killer Among Us (1998)

Professional ratings
Review scores
Source	Rating
Allmusic	3/5 stars

A.K.A. I-D-I-O-T is an EP by Swedish band The Hives, released in 1998.

The song "A.K.A. I-D-I-O-T" was first released as the second track on The Hives' first album, Barely Legal. It was released again on the compilation Your New Favourite Band, though not in its entirety, along with "Outsmarted", "Untutored Youth" and "Mad Man". "Numbers" is a cover of The Adicts' song from the album Songs of Praise and appeared only on the American pressing of the EP.

== Music video ==
An unreleased music video was filmed in black-and-white and features the band performing this song in a recording studio. All of the band members, excluding Chris Dangerous, are wearing sunglasses. The strobe lights are flashing during the chorus of "A.K.A. I-D-I-O-T".

== Track listing ==
No.	Title	Length
1.	"A.K.A. I-D-I-O-T"	2:15
2.	"Outsmarted"	2:14
3.	"Untutored Youth"	1:34
4.	"Fever"	2:23
5.	"Mad Man"	2:29
Total length:		10:55

Reissue bonus track
No.	Title	Length
6.	"Numbers" (The Adicts cover)	1:58
Total length:		12:53

== Personnel ==
The Hives

- Howlin' Pelle Almqvist – vocals
- Nicholaus Arson – guitar
- Vigilante Carlstroem – guitar
- Dr. Matt Destruction – bass
- Chris Dangerous – drums

Additional personnel

- Freddy Flame – recording (track 2–5)
- Pelle Gunnerfeldt – recording (track 1)
- Chris Dangerous – recording (track 6)
- Peter In de Betou – mastering
- Karl – artwork
