= Go Right Ahead =

Single by The Hives

from the album Lex Hives
- B-side: "1000 Answers"
- Released: 3 April 2012
- Recorded: Atlantis (Stockholm, Sweden); Riksmixningsverket Studios (Stockholm, Sweden)
- Genre: Garage punk; post-punk revival
- Length: 3:06
- Label: Disque Hives; No Fun
- Songwriter(s): Randy Fitzsimmons; Jeff Lynne
- Producer(s): The Hives

The Hives singles chronology
"A Christmas Duel" (2008)	"Go Right Ahead" (2012)

"Go Right Ahead" is a song by Swedish rock band the Hives, released as a single in 2012. It is the first single taken from their fifth full-length album Lex Hives and is the second listed track from that album. "Go Right Ahead" was released on 3 April 2012 through digital download platforms such as iTunes and Spotify. It was also released as a limited edition 7" vinyl for Record Store Day on 21 April 2012, however, it was available for purchase at the Zia Records tent during the first weekend of the Coachella Valley Music and Arts Festival on 15 April where they were signing records for fans. A live recording of the track was featured on the Adult Swim Singles Program 2012

== Background ==
In the lead up to their announcement of a new single, five teaser videos were gradually posted on their official YouTube channel, each showing a member of the band playing their part of "Go Right Ahead". The song was also played live at the Norwegian/Swedish talkshow "Skavlan", broadcast on 30 March 2012.

The main riff for the song is similar to British group Electric Light Orchestra's (ELO) "Don't Bring Me Down". It was not intentionally copied, but once they realized that the songs sounded alike they contacted ELO's Jeff Lynne, who wrote "Don't Bring Me Down", to get permission to use the riff. As a result, Lynne is credited as one of the song's writers. Lynne was also credited as composer in the album's liner notes.

== Music video ==
=== Broadcast From RMV ===
A live music video was released on 9 May 2012 and shows The Hives with additional live members performing the song inside Benny Andersson's (ABBA) Riksmixningsverket (RMV) Studios in Sweden. The concept for this video is a representative in-studio take with the audio recorded as they performed, borne of the band's desire to create something "more realistic than most 'rock videos.'” Randy Fitzsimmons, who is credited with songwriting on every song, can be seen through the studio window wearing a mask.

=== Official ===
The official music video was released on 8 June 2012 and was initially only available in Germany, Australia and the UK before it was uploaded onto the band's YouTube channel. It was directed by Swedish design duo Johan Toorell and John Nordqvist of Bold Faces. The monochrome video features The Hives playing the song suspended on board a makeshift stage attached to a Zeppelin and being pulled along the roads of a city.

== Track listings ==
7" vinyl (limited release for Record Store Day)

1. "Go Right Ahead" – 3:06
2. "1000 Answers" – 2:07

== Personnel ==
The Hives

- Howlin' Pelle Almqvist – vocals
- Nicholaus Arson – lead guitar
- Vigilante Carlstroem – rhythm guitar
- Dr. Matt Destruction – bass guitar
- Chris Dangerous – drums

Additional musicians and personnel

- Gustav Bendt – saxophone
- Per Ruskträsk Johansson – saxophone
- Jonas Kullhammar – saxophone
- Janne Hansson – engineer
- Michael Ilbert – engineer
- Bernard Löhr – engineer
- Linn Fijal – assistant engineer
- Andrew Scheps – mixing
- Stephen Marcussen – mastering

== Charts ==
Chart performance for "Go Right Ahead"
Chart (2012)	Peak position
Canada: Active Rock (America's Music Charts)	37
Canada: Alternative Rock (America's Music Charts)	44
Czech Republic Modern Rock (IFPI)	8
US Alternative Songs (Billboard)	40
