= Two-Timing Touch and Broken Bones =

Single by The Hives

from the album Tyrannosaurus Hives
- Released: 4 January 2005
- Recorded: 2004
- Genre: Garage punk, garage rock
- Length: 2:00
- Label: Polydor
- Songwriters: Fitzsimmons, Randy

The Hives singles chronology
"Walk Idiot Walk" (2004)	"Two-Timing Touch and Broken Bones" (2005)	"Abra Cadaver" (2004)

"Two-Timing Touch and Broken Bones" is the second single from the album Tyrannosaurus Hives by The Hives. Released as an Enhanced CD with B-side tracks in 2005, "Two-Timing Touch and Broken Bones" was considered a hit for The Hives, and appeared on several compilations.

== Background ==
The guitar riff for "Two-Timing Touch and Broken Bones" is borrowed from a song by The Monkees 1966 hit "(I'm Not Your) Steppin' Stone", which was written by Tommy Boyce and Bobby Hart. The chord sequence, which has been described as being jerky and monotonous by Marc Spitz of Spin magazine, is similar to the song "Kicks" by Paul Revere & the Raiders. "Two-Timing Touch and Broken Bones" has also been said to sound like Devo, and embraces the "garage rock" sound.

Other than appearing on the album, it was released on 4 January 2005, as a 7" single and Enhanced CD along with the songs "Born To Cry" and "Little Lil", both of which did not appear on Tyrannosaurus Hives. "Two-Timing Touch and Broken Bones" was included on the soundtracks of a couple video games, namely the Madden NFL 2005 and the MotoGP '06 soundtracks, as well as on several other compilations.

A video for "Two-Timing Touch and Broken Bones" was made, and it was included on the single in QuickTime format.

The Hives also went on tour during the winter of 2004 in order to promote "Two-Timing Touch and Broken Bones" and the release of Tyrannosaurus Hives. The song is generally considered an enjoyable moment in their live performances, where Almqvist's stage antics are found particularly entertaining. "Two-Timing Touch and Broken Bones" remains a favorite among fans.

== Reception ==
Professional ratings
Review scores
Source	Rating
AllMusic	2.5/5 stars

"Two-Timing Touch and Broken Bones" reached number 44 on the UK "Top 75" charts, during the week of 30 October 2004. The music video debuted on MTV Europe's Top 20 list on 4 December 2004 at number 19. It peaked at number 16 on 18 December 2004, and remained on the charts for 4 weeks, departing on 8 January 2005.

Reviews among critics were mixed; James Snodgrass of NME said "'Two-timing touch and broken bones' might as well be 'too dumb, and Dutch, and broken bones'. Heather Phares of AllMusic liked the speed of the song in comparison with those it was structurally built from, saying that it "cut(s) right to the chase". It has also been said to be a straightforward song which embodies The Hives' sound, and one of the highlights of Tyrannosaurus Hives.

== Track list ==
Enhanced CD
No.	Title	Length
1.	"Two-Timing Touch and Broken Bones"	2:00
2.	"Born to Cry"	2:18
3.	"Little Lil"	2:17
4.	"Two-Timing Touch and Broken Bones" (music video)	-
Total length:		6:35

7" vinyl
No.	Title	Length
1.	"Two-Timing Touch and Broken Bones"	2:00
2.	"Born to Cry"	2:18
Total length:		4:18

Information on Enhanced CD track listing.
Information on 7" track listing.

== Chart performance ==
Chart (2004)	Peak position
UK Top 75 Charts	44
MTV Europe (music video)	16

== Personnel ==
- Howlin' Pelle Almqvist (Per Almqvist) – lead vocals
- Nicholaus Arson (Niklas Almqvist) – guitar
- Vigilante Carlstroem (Mikael Karlsson) – guitar
- Dr. Matt Destruction (Mattias Bernvall) – bass guitar
- Chris Dangerous (Christian Grahn) – drums
- Michael Ilbert – mixing
- Pelle Gunnerfeldt – production

== Appearances ==
- Promo Only: Modern Rock Radio (2004)
- Tyrannosaurus Hives (2004)
- Absolute Rock in the UK (2005)
- Two Timing Touch and Broken Bones (2005)
- Madden NFL 2005 Soundtrack (2005)
- MotoGP Soundtrack (2006)
- Punk Rock (Universal) (2006)
- Big...in UK (2007)

Information on appearances.

== Sources ==
- "The Clip List". Billboard Magazine. 116 (49). December 4, 2004. ISSN 0006-2510.
- "The Clip List". Billboard Magazine. 113 (51). December 18, 2004. ISSN 0006-2510.
- "The Clip List". Billboard Magazine. 117 (2). January 8, 2005. ISSN 0006-2510.
- "The Hives". The New Yorker. 80 (18–24). 2004. OCLC 1760231.
- Spitz, Marc (August 2004). "Sharp Dressed Manskap". Spin Magazine. 20 (8). ISSN 0886-3032.
- Strong, Martin Charles (2006). The essential rock discography. Open City Books. ISBN 978-1-84195-860-6.
