= Tick Tick Boom (song) =

Single by The Hives

from the album The Black and White Album
- B-side: "Hell No" (EU 7"); "Square One Here I Come" (US 7"); "Waits Too Long" (EU CD, US CD); "Fall Is Just Something Grown Ups Invented" (US CD)
- Released: 8 October 2007
- Recorded: 2007
- Genre: Punk rock; garage punk
- Length: 3:25 (album version); 3:42 (single version)
- Label: A&M Octone; Polydor
- Songwriter: Randy Fitzsimmons
- Producer: Jacknife Lee

The Hives singles chronology
"Throw It on Me" (2007)	"Tick Tick Boom" (2007)	"T.H.E.H.I.V.E.S." (2008)

"Tick Tick Boom" is a single by Swedish rock band the Hives, released in 2007. It is the opening track to The Black and White Album and is the first single taken from that album. "Tick Tick Boom" was released on 8 October 2007.

The song was voted in at number 99 in the Triple J Hottest 100 of 2007.

== Music video ==
Two music videos exist for this song. The video directed by Kalle Haglund stars the Hives as giant statues in Stockholm's Liljevalchs konsthall, who eventually destroy the museum on the song's final "Boom". In the video, the Hives wear fashion suits with white dress shoes. The second version is of a staged live performance of the song, part of which was featured in the Nike/Finish Line commercial.

== Controversy ==
During a 2013 performance in Boston, Howlin Pelle Almqvist dedicated the song to the crowd, saying: "This song's for everyone in Boston. It's about stuff blowing up. It's called Tick, Tick, Boom," This remark garnered a considerable amount of backlash due to the recent Boston Marathon Bombings. The next day, the band posted an apology on their Facebook page, where Pelle wrote: "I wanted to dedicate a song to the Boston crowd because they had been so great throughout the show, and unfortunately, Tick Tick Boom was the next song in the set. The tragic Boston Marathon bombing never once crossed my mind while on stage, and of course, it should have. My most sincere apologies to the people of Boston for this unintentional but serious mistake."

== In popular culture ==
- The song was once the goal song for Vancouver Canucks defenseman Alex Edler in the 2015–16 NHL season, as the Canucks began using player-specific goal songs.
- The song received a large exposure to American audiences, appearing in several TV shows, documentaries, video games and films including CSI: Miami, Friday Night Lights, Jumper, Taken, Friday the 13th, MacGruber, The Heat, 30 Minutes or Less, The Nut Job 2, AmeriBoomBorn Chinese, Warren Miller's Playground, The Rookie and Dirt 4, Guitar Hero: Warriors of Rock, Madden NFL 08, Madden NFL 11 and 25 (2024), Forza Motorsport 3, MotorStorm: Arctic Edge, Video On Trial, NCAA Football 10, Back 4 Blood and Lego Rock Band.
- The song has also appeared in trailers and commercials for Get Smart, Get Smart's Bruce and Lloyd: Out of Control, Overstrike (later rebranded as Fuse), Fox Sports 1, Spy Kids: All the Time in the World, Marvel's Agent Carter, Lego Marvel Superheroes 2, Suicide Squad: Kill the Justice League, and Helldivers 2.
- WWE used the song to serve as the theme song for the 2007 PPV event Survivor Series.
- In 2009, ESPN used the song in a video package highlighting the moments of the decade in college football.
- The song also appeared in the 2018 horror comedy Slaughterhouse Rulez.

== Track listing ==
European 7" (Includes exclusive signed poster)
No.	Title	Length
1.	"Tick Tick Boom"	3:35
2.	"Hell No"	2:19
Total length:		5:54

US 7"
No.	Title	Length
1.	"Tick Tick Boom"	3:35
2.	"Square One Here I Come"	3:10
Total length:		6:45

European CD
No.	Title	Length
1.	"Tick Tick Boom"	3:35
2.	"Waits Too Long"	3:26
Total length:		7:01

US CD
No.	Title	Length
1.	"Tick Tick Boom"	3:35
2.	"Waits Too Long"	3:26
3.	"Fall Is Just Something Grownups Invented"	2:41
4.	"Tick Tick Boom" (music video)	-
Total length:		9:42

== Charts ==
Chart performance for "Tick Tick Boom"
Chart (2007)	Peak position
Austria (Ö3 Austria Top 40)	75
Czech Republic Modern Rock (IFPI)	8
Sweden (Sverigetopplistan)	25
UK Singles (Official Charts)	41
US Alternative Airplay (Billboard)	36

== Certifications ==
Region	Certification	Certified units/sales
United Kingdom (BPI)	Silver	200,000^{‡}
^{‡} Sales+streaming figures based on certification alone.
