= Lex Hives =

Studio album by the Hives
- Released: 1 June 2012
- Studio: Hive Manor (Fagersta); Riksmixningsverket (Stockholm); Atlantis (Stockholm); Decibel (Stockholm); Megaton (Stockholm); Svenska Grammofon (Gothenburg); Hansa (Berlin); Pink Duck (Burbank)
- Genre: Garage rock revival; garage punk
- Length: 31:14
- Label: Disques Hives; Universal; Columbia
- Producer: The Hives; Josh Homme (Note: Tracks 13 and 14)

The Hives chronology
Tarred and Feathered (2010)	Lex Hives (2012)	The Death of Randy Fitzsimmons (2023)

Singles from Lex Hives
- 1. "Go Right Ahead" Released: 3 April 2012; 2. "Wait a Minute" Released: August 2012

Lex Hives is the fifth studio album by Swedish rock band the Hives, released on 1 June 2012 through Disques Hives, Universal Music, and Columbia Records. It was self-produced by the Hives and mixed by Andrew Scheps, with two additional tracks mixed by Dave Sardy and Joe Zook. The deluxe version features bonus tracks (digital download only) produced by Queens of the Stone Age frontman Josh Homme. It became the last album from the band to feature bassist Dr. Matt Destruction as he left for health reasons in late 2013 and was replaced by Randy bassist Johan Gustafsson, who adopted the stage name "The Johan and Only."

The term "Lex Hives" is a phrase derived from the ancient Roman practice of enacting a system or body of laws and accepting them as a standard.

== Background ==
After recording two albums (Tyrannosaurus Hives, The Black and White Album) for the Universal Music Group's Interscope label, the band did not want to extend the deal, and so the band found themselves as free agents. The Hives responded by going independent for their fifth album. Lex Hives was self-funded and self-produced, and has been issued on the band's own Disques Hives imprint.

As for why the band took five years between albums, frontman Howlin' Pelle Almqvist noted the group toured for nearly three years after The Black and White Album, but added that self-producing an album with a five-piece band is not the quickest of ways to reach a consensus. "We thought it would be faster if we produced it ourselves as opposed to scheduling it with someone who’s busy 24-7, 365 days per year," Almqvist said. "Rather than squeeze in some studio time, we could go into the studio whenever we wanted. It turns out that having five producers who have an equal say of everything isn’t that fast. You’d think we could have guessed that in advance."

For promotion, the Hives initiated a contest on social networking website Facebook on 23 March 2012. A news update on their official website revealed the song titles on 12 tracks however they were purposely jumbled up. Fans had to post their guesses as to what they thought the tracks were called on the band's official Facebook page. It stated that the first person to unscramble all the song titles correctly would "receive a phone call from The Hives." The band announced the grand prize winner and 17 runners-up on their Facebook page on 6 April 2012.

== Reception ==
The album debuted at number 7 on the Swedish chart, 20 on the Swiss chart, 38 on the Austrian chart, 38 on the Australian chart and 53 on the Canadian Albums Chart.

The album received generally favorable reviews from critics.

Professional ratings
Aggregate scores
Source	Rating
Metacritic	69/100
Review scores
Source	Rating
Consequence of Sound	C–
Pitchfork	4.8/10
Punknews.org	5/5 stars
Rolling Stone	3/5 stars
Spin	7/10
NME	4/5 stars

== Track listing ==
All tracks are written by Randy Fitzsimmons, except where noted.

No.	Title	Writer(s)	Length
1.	"Come On!"		1:09
2.	"Go Right Ahead"	Fitzsimmons, Jeff Lynne	3:06
3.	"1000 Answers"		2:07
4.	"I Want More"		2:52
5.	"Wait a Minute"		3:02
6.	"Patrolling Days"		4:01
7.	"Take Back the Toys"		2:54
8.	"Without the Money"		1:54
9.	"These Spectacles Reveal the Nostalgics"		1:57
10.	"My Time Is Coming"		2:34
11.	"If I Had a Cent"		2:01
12.	"Midnight Shifter"		3:37
Total length:			31:14

Deluxe edition bonus tracks
No.	Title	Writer(s)	Length
13.	"High School Shuffle" (Alex Carole and the Crush cover)	Fredrik Andersson, Jonas Murray Calander, Andreas Jonsson, Mats Larsson, Anders Pietsch	3:02
14.	"Insane" (The Dragtones cover)	Luis Arriaga, Mikael Lindevall	2:47
15.	"Come On!" (live at Terminal 5)		1:31
16.	"Take Back the Toys" (live at Terminal 5)		3:24
17.	"1000 Answers" (live at Terminal 5)		2:21
18.	"Wait a Minute" (live at Terminal 5)		4:07
19.	"Go Right Ahead" (live at Terminal 5)	Fitzsimmons, Lynne	3:36
20.	"Patrolling Days" (live at Terminal 5)		4:44

Notes

1. Both bonus tracks (13, 14) are cover songs, but are directly related to one of the Hives' members in some way. "High School Shuffle" is a cover of an Alex Carole and the Crush song that was produced by Chris Dangerous (drums). "Insane" is a cover of the Dragtones' original, and Vigilante Carlstroem (guitar) is a member of that band.
2. "Go Right Ahead" has songwriting also credited to Jeff Lynne as the band got permission to include a similar riff to Electric Light Orchestra's "Don't Bring Me Down".

== Personnel ==
The Hives

- Howlin' Pelle Almqvist – vocals, vocoder
- Nicholaus Arson – lead guitar, backing vocals
- Vigilante Carlstroem – rhythm guitar, backing vocals
- Dr. Matt Destruction – bass guitar
- Chris Dangerous – drums

Additional musicians

- Gustav Bendt – saxophone
- Per Ruskträsk Johansson – saxophone
- Jonas Kullhammar – saxophone

Technical

- The Hives – producer, engineer, assistant engineer
- Josh Homme – producer (13–14)
- Henrik Alsér engineer
- Michael Ilbert – engineer
- Karl Larsson – engineer
- Dagge Lundquist – engineer
- Johan Gustavsson – engineer
- Kalle Gustavsson – engineer
- Justin Smith – engineer
- Janne Hansson – engineer
- Linn Fijal – assistant engineer
- Andrew Scheps – mixing (except 2, 7)
- Joe Zook – mixing (2)
- Dave Sardy – mixing (7)
- Stephen Marcussen – mastering
- Henke Walse – art direction
- Erik Undéhn – photography

== Charts ==
Chart performance for Lex Hives
Chart (2012)	Peak position
Australian Albums (ARIA)	38
Austrian Albums (Ö3 Austria)	38
Belgian Albums (Ultratop Flanders)	126
French Albums (SNEP)	47
German Albums (Offizielle Top 100)	25
Swedish Albums (Sverigetopplistan)	7
Swiss Albums (Schweizer Hitparade)	20
UK Albums (OCC)	71
US Billboard 200	84
