= A Christmas Duel =

Single by The Hives and Cyndi Lauper
- Released: 19 November 2008
- Recorded: 2008
- Genre: Pop rock
- Length: 4:48
- Songwriter: Randy Fitzsimmons

The Hives singles chronology
"Won't Be Long" (2008)	"A Christmas Duel" (2008)	"Go Right Ahead" (2012)

Cyndi Lauper singles chronology
"Into the Nightlife" (2008)	"A Christmas Duel" (2008)	"Just Your Fool" (2010)

Music video
- "A Christmas Duel" on YouTube

"A Christmas Duel" is a Christmas duet recorded by the Swedish rock band the Hives and American singer-songwriter Cyndi Lauper. It was available as a single on 19 November 2008. It debuted at No. 6 on the Swedish Singles Chart published on 28 December, and later reached a peak at No. 4. It was released as a vinyl one-sided 7", a CD 5" single, and as download (all in Sweden only).

The song juxtaposes "really sweet music and nasty lyrics". As for how the collaboration took place, The Hives' lead singer Pelle Almqvist stated: "We came up with the song and we figured it was a duet, and we'd always hoped to do a duet with Cyndi Lauper."

"A Christmas Duel" also appears on No Ho Ho: Alternative Christmas Holiday Anthems, released on 10 November 2009.

== Charts ==
Chart performance for "A Christmas Duel"
Chart (2008)	Peak position
Sweden (Sverigetopplistan)	4
