= The Black and White Album =

Studio album by the Hives
- Released: 9 October 2007
- Studio: Sweet Tea (Oxford); Delta (Como); Gröndahl (Stockholm); Park (Stockholm); Hive Manor (Fagersta); Olympic (London); The Garage (Crundale); Criteria (Miami)
- Genre: Garage rock revival
- Length: 47:57
- Label: A&M/Octone; Polydor
- Producer: Dennis Herring; The Hives; Pharrell Williams; Jacknife Lee; Thomas Öberg

The Hives chronology
Tyrannosaurus Hives (2004)	The Black and White Album (2007)	Tarred and Feathered (2010)

Singles from The Black and White Album
- 1. "Tick Tick Boom" Released: 14 August 2007; 2. "T.H.E.H.I.V.E.S." Released: February 2008; 3. "Won't Be Long" Released: 2008

Professional ratings
Aggregate scores
Source	Rating
Metacritic	72/100
Review scores
Source	Rating
AllMusic	3.5/5 stars
Collective	4.5/5 stars
Drowned in Sound	7/10
Entertainment Weekly	A−
The Guardian	4/5 stars
NME	8/10
Pitchfork	6.2/10
Rolling Stone	4/5 stars
Spin	4/5 stars
The Times	4/5 stars

The Black and White Album is the fourth studio album by Swedish rock band the Hives, released on 8 October 2007 through A&M/Octone and Polydor Records. The Hives recorded 20 to 30 songs (including seven recorded with producers the Neptunes) for this album from which they finally chose the best. Other tracks were produced by Jacknife Lee and Dennis Herring. Sessions were held with Timbaland, with whom the band produced the song "Throw It On Me", but took place too late for any of the resulting tracks to be on the album. They hoped to use these songs as B-sides. It is the band's longest album and the only one over the length of 32 minutes.

== Background ==
The band revealed in an NME interview that one song, "Puppet on a String", has just "piano and hand claps". The song "A Stroll Through Hive Manor Corridors" is an instrumental using just a 1960s organ and a drum machine.

"Well All Right!" and "T.H.E.H.I.V.E.S." were produced by Pharrell Williams of the Neptunes, and "Try It Again" features the cheerleading squad from the University of Mississippi.

A video for "Won't Be Long" was released on the Hives Myspace on 26 August 2008.

The song "Fall Is Just Something Grownups Invented" was used for autumn promotions on the US television channel Cartoon Network in 2007. This song appears as a bonus track on the United Kingdom version of the album, the iTunes release in the United States and on the Japanese edition with the album, along with "Hell No".

== Release ==
The first single from the album "Tick Tick Boom" appeared in the games Madden NFL 08 and Madden NFL 11; although it is an early version with some notable changes, such as an alternative chorus. The final version appears on the album as well as in NCAA Football 10. Clips from this song appeared in a Nike commercial (2007-08-14th US, and 2007-09-24th UK) prior to the single's release date on 8 October 2007.

On 9 October 2007 iTunes globally released the singles: "Tick Tick Boom", "Try It Again", "You Got It All... Wrong", "Well All Right!", "Won't Be Long", and the non-album bonus track "Fall Is Just Something Grownups Invented".

The originally scheduled release of the album (on 9 October 2007) was postponed until 15 October 2007 in the United Kingdom (via Polydor Records) and 13 November 2007 in the United States (via A&M/Octone Records and No Fun AB).

On 17 December 2007 the band's website confirmed "T.H.E.H.I.V.E.S." would be released in February 2008 as a single.

== Track listing ==
All songs by Randy Fitzsimmons, except where noted.

The Black and White Album track listing
No.	Title	Writer(s)	Length
1.	"Tick Tick Boom"		3:25
2.	"Try It Again"		3:29
3.	"You Got It All... Wrong"		2:42
4.	"Well All Right!"	Fitzsimmons; Pharrell Williams	3:29
5.	"Hey Little World"		3:22
6.	"A Stroll Through Hive Manor Corridors"		2:37
7.	"Won't Be Long"		3:46
8.	"T.H.E.H.I.V.E.S."	Fitzsimmons; Williams	3:37
9.	"Return the Favour"		3:09
10.	"Giddy Up!"		2:51
11.	"Square One Here I Come"		3:10
12.	"You Dress Up for Armageddon"		3:09
13.	"Puppet on a String"		2:54
14.	"Bigger Hole to Fill"		3:37

UK bonus track
No.	Title	Length
15.	"Fall Is Just Something Grown-Ups Invented"	2:40

Japanese bonus tracks
No.	Title	Length
15.	"Fall Is Just Something Grown-Ups Invented"	2:40
16.	"Hell No"	2:19

Indie exclusive bonus track
No.	Title	Length
15.	"I Can't Give It to You"	3:37

== Personnel ==
The Hives

- Howlin' Pelle Almqvist – vocals
- Nicholaus Arson – guitar
- Vigilante Carlstroem – guitar
- Dr. Matt Destruction – bass guitar
- Chris Dangerous – drums

Additional musicians

- Ole Miss Cheerleaders – backing vocals on "Try It Again"

Technical

- Dennis Herring – producer (1–3, 7, 9, 11, 12)
- Pharrell Williams – producer (4, 8)
- Garrett "Jacknife" Lee – producer (5)
- The Hives – producer (6, 10, 13), mixing (6), engineer
- Thomas Öberg – producer (14)
- Chris Shepard – engineer
- Joe Zook – engineer
- Matt Radovice – engineer
- Andrew Coleman – engineer
- Henrik Svensson – engineer
- Mathias Oldén – engineer
- Michael Ilbert – engineer
- Maurits Carlsson – engineer
- Johan Gustavsson – engineer
- John Hanes – engineer
- Jimbo Mathis – engineer
- Will Dawson – engineer, assistant engineer
- Herman Söderström – engineer
- Brian Humprey – additional engineer
- Kyle "Slick" Johnson – additional engineer
- Dave Rieley – assistant engineer
- Javier Valverde – assistant engineer
- Matias Olden – assistant engineer
- Miguel Bustamante – assistant engineer
- Stefan Bohman – assistant engineer
- Tim Roberts – assistant engineer
- Pelle Gunnerfeldt – mixing (3, 5, 9–14)
- Serban Ghenea – mixing (1, 2, 4, 7, 8)
- Ted Jensen – mastering
- Henrik Walse/Walse Custom Design – art direction
- Bisse Bengtsson/Adamsky – photography

== Charts ==
Chart performance for The Black and White Album
Chart (2007)	Peak position
Australian Albums (ARIA)	36
Austrian Albums (Ö3 Austria)	23
Belgian Albums (Ultratop Flanders)	83
French Albums (SNEP)	38
German Albums (Offizielle Top 100)	13
Norwegian Albums (VG-lista)	32
Swedish Albums (Sverigetopplistan)	4
Swiss Albums (Schweizer Hitparade)	18
UK Albums (OCC)	29
US Billboard 200	65
