= The Death of Randy Fitzsimmons =

Studio album by The Hives
- Released: 11 August 2023
- Studios: Atlantis (Stockholm); Riksmixningsverket (Stockholm); Patrik's House (Stockholm)
- Genre: Garage rock
- Length: 31:26
- Label: Disques Hives
- Producer: Patrik Berger

The Hives chronology
Lex Hives (2012)	The Death of Randy Fitzsimmons (2023)	The Hives Forever Forever the Hives (2025)

Singles from The Death of Randy Fitzsimmons
- 1. "Bogus Operandi" Released: 2 May 2023; 2. "Countdown to Shutdown" Released: 13 June 2023; 3. "Rigor Mortis Radio" Released: 11 July 2023; 4. "Trapdoor Solution" / "The Bomb" Released: 1 August 2023

The Death of Randy Fitzsimmons is the sixth studio album by Swedish rock band The Hives, released on 11 August 2023 through the band's Disques Hives label. The album marks the first studio release in over 11 years, since 2012's Lex Hives, marking the longest gap between two Hives albums.

== Background ==
The album was recorded in a studio owned by ABBA member Benny Anderson in Stockholm. Announced on 2 May 2023, the day also saw the release of the first single "Bogus Operandi". The trademark "suave sound" fizzling with "wild energy" of the song was seen as setting the tone for the whole project. According to Rolling Stone, the album is "a collection of 12 high-energy punk-ish songs reminiscent of their best work from the early 2000s". Lead singer Pelle Almqvist reflected on the intention of the record, saying, "Rock'n'roll can't grow up, it is a perpetual teenager and this album feels exactly like that". According to a press release, the "macabre title" hints at the extended break the band took from recording, described as a "horror story". "Randy Fitzsimmons" refers to the fictional sixth member of the Hives who supposedly served as the band's manager and sole songwriter.

The album is the first release to feature bassist The Johan and Only, following the departure of Dr. Matt Destruction in 2013. The band had several headlining shows in New York and California in early May 2023, following that by supporting Arctic Monkeys on a UK stadium tour starting on 27 May 2023.

== Critical reception ==
Professional ratings
Aggregate scores
Source	Rating
AnyDecentMusic?	7.7/10
Metacritic	77/100
Review scores
Source	Rating
AllMusic	4/5 stars
American Songwriter	4/5 stars
DIY	4/5 stars
Exclaim!	8/10
The Guardian	4/5 stars
The Line of Best Fit	7/10
Mojo	3/5 stars
NME	4/5 stars
Pitchfork	6.9/10
The Skinny	5/5 stars

The Death of Randy Fitzsimmons received a score of 77 out of 100 on review aggregator Metacritic based on 14 critics' reviews, indicating "generally favorable" reception. In a five-star review, Logan Walker of The Skinny described the album as "a breathless exercise in how rock music should be played. It's fun, frenetic, and full to the brim with that trademark Hives humour". Elliot Burr of The Line of Best Fit felt that "there's more life in these elder statesmen yet, despite the ironic deathly connotations that abound" and called the Hives "the whirling dervish we've enjoyed for decades, having brewed another storm when music needs a serious injection of fun again". Peyton Thomas of Pitchfork remarked that "none of the Hives' brethren in the garage revival would ever risk sounding this stupid" but that the band "refuse to evolve or age—they are here for a good time and absolutely nothing else".

Uncut wrote that "it's back-to-basics good fun garage rock, and while it's familiar territory it's undeniable that the band know their way around a hook", while Mojo felt that "over 12 mostly blueprint-hugging songs returns diminish, but scuzzy beat-box disco outrider 'What Did I Ever Do to You?' is great".

== Track listing ==
All lyrics are written by Howlin' Pelle Almqvist; all music is composed by Chip Fitzsimmons, Montgomery Fitzsimmons, Randy Fitzsimmons, and Wilbur Fitzsimmons.

The Death of Randy Fitzsimmons track listing
No.	Title	Length
1.	"Bogus Operandi"	3:43
2.	"Trapdoor Solution"	1:03
3.	"Countdown to Shutdown"	3:13
4.	"Rigor Mortis Radio"	2:28
5.	"Stick Up"	2:19
6.	"Smoke & Mirrors"	3:01
7.	"Crash Into the Weekend"	2:58
8.	"Two Kinds of Trouble"	2:44
9.	"The Way the Story Goes"	2:56
10.	"The Bomb"	2:13
11.	"What Did I Ever Do to You?"	3:09
12.	"Step Out of the Way"	1:39
Total length:		31:26

== Personnel ==
The Hives

- Chris Dangerous – drums (credited as "rhythm")
- Howlin' Pelle Almqvist – vocals
- The Johan and Only – bass guitar
- Nicholaus Arson – guitar (credited as "treble")
- Vigilante Carlstroem – guitar (credited as "middle")

Additional contributors

- Patrik Berger – production
- Robin Schmidt – mastering
- Pelle Gunnerfeldt – mixing
- Jonas Kullhammar – saxophone (tracks 5, 6)
- Markus Krunegård – background vocals (6)

== Charts ==
Chart performance for The Death of Randy Fitzsimmons
Chart (2023)	Peak position
Australian Albums (ARIA)	61
Austrian Albums (Ö3 Austria)	54
Belgian Albums (Ultratop Flanders)	64
Belgian Albums (Ultratop Wallonia)	20
Finnish Albums (Suomen virallinen lista)	15
French Albums (SNEP)	39
German Albums (Offizielle Top 100)	8
Scottish Albums (Official Charts)	2
Spanish Albums (Promusicae)	94
Swedish Albums (Sverigetopplistan)	1
Swiss Albums (Schweizer Hitparade)	9
UK Albums (Official Charts)	2
UK Independent Albums (Official Charts)	1
US Independent Albums (Billboard)	49
