= The Hives Forever Forever the Hives =

Studio album by the Hives
- Released: 29 August 2025
- Studio: Year0001 (Stockholm); Riksmixningsverket (Stockholm)
- Genre: Garage rock
- Length: 32:57
- Label: PIAS
- Producer: Pelle Gunnerfeldt

The Hives chronology
The Death of Randy Fitzsimmons (2023)	The Hives Forever Forever the Hives (2025)

Singles from The Hives Forever Forever the Hives
- 1. "Enough Is Enough" Released: 1 April 2025; 2. "Paint a Picture" Released: 17 June 2025; 3. "Legalize Living" Released: 7 July 2025; 4. "The Hives Forever Forever the Hives" Released: 14 August 2025

Professional ratings
Aggregate scores
Source	Rating
Metacritic	82/100
Review scores
Source	Rating
AllMusic	4/5 stars
Kerrang!	4/5 stars
Mojo	4/5 stars
Paste	8.5/10 stars
New Noise Magazine	5/5 stars
The Spill Magazine	4.5/5 stars
Classic Rock	4.5/5 stars
DIY	4/5 stars

The Hives Forever Forever the Hives is the seventh studio album by Swedish garage rock band the Hives, released on 29 August 2025 through PIAS Recordings.

== Background and release ==
On 1 April 2025, the Hives announced their seventh studio album The Hives Forever Forever the Hives, alongside the release of the lead single "Enough Is Enough", and details of a world tour beginning in July 2025.

Recording sessions for the album took place at Riksmixningsverket, a studio owned by ABBA's Benny Andersson and at Year0001's Stockholm studio, associated with Swedish rapper Yung Lean. The album was co-produced by longtime collaborator Pelle Gunnerfeldt and Beastie Boys member Mike D. Queens of the Stone Age frontman Josh Homme contributed to the album in an advisory role.

In a statement accompanying the announcement, the band described it as "a new record so full of energy, joy, anger and life that you will be questioning reality as you have known it... Every single song a single, every single single a hit, every hit a direct hit in the face of the man."

In an interview with Yahoo Entertainment, frontman Pelle Almqvist recalled the band's reaction to Mike D's presence in the studio:

Mike D from the Beastie Boys came to the studio in Stockholm on the first day we were in there. We were recording the album with Pelle Gunnerfeldt, who's our usual producer and mentor. He's been around since our first album [Barely Legal]. We're all big Beastie Boys fans, but I think he might be the biggest one. When Mike showed up, everyone was like, "This is going to be fun". But then, everybody got really nervous pretty quickly. Pelle started stumbling over cables, and connecting things the wrong way. It was pretty funny.

== Critical reception ==
Steve Beebee of Kerrang! praised the album's "breakneck" energy and hook-driven songwriting, describing it as "as uncorrupted a rock album as any released this year". He wrote that the band successfully continued their established formula while keeping "excitement levels high".

Writing for Mojo, James McNair praised the album's "deeply felt and furious riffage" and noted that the band remained "amped up to 11" decades into their career. He also highlighted the album's stylistic experimentation, comparing the title track to "The Strokes going electro" and describing "Path Of Most Resistance" as featuring a "Devo-ish" guitar hook.

Luke Von Rinehart of New Noise Magazine wrote that the album continued the band's "signature recipe of killer riffs and rockin’ anthems". He highlighted tracks such as "Paint A Picture" and "Born A Rebel" for balancing intensity with musical variety, concluding that the group remained "consistent and dependable" garage rock performers.

Heather Phares of AllMusic described the album as "among the Hives' most consistent", praising its balance of "blunt force, sharp wit, and refusal to sit still". She highlighted the band's continued political undercurrent and musical versatility, while noting that the album successfully revisited styles from across the group's earlier work.

== Track listing ==
All lyrics are written by Howlin' Pelle Almqvist; all music is composed by The Hives.

The Hives Forever Forever the Hives track listing
No.	Title	Length
1.	"(Introduction)"	0:28
2.	"Enough Is Enough"	2:46
3.	"Hooray Hooray Hooray"	2:32
4.	"Bad Call"	3:31
5.	"Paint a Picture"	2:48
6.	"O.C.D.O.D."	1:44
7.	"Legalize Living"	3:24
8.	"(Interlude)"	1:16
9.	"Roll Out the Red Carpet"	2:19
10.	"Born a Rebel"	3:03
11.	"They Can't Hear the Music"	2:41
12.	"Path of Most Resistance"	3:22
13.	"The Hives Forever Forever the Hives"	3:03
Total length:		32:57

== Personnel ==
Credits adapted from the album's liner notes.

=== The Hives ===
- Vigilante Carlstroem – rhythm guitar
- The Johan and Only – bass
- Chris Dangerous – drums
- Howlin' Pelle Almqvist – lead vocals
- Nicholaus Arson – lead guitar

=== Additional contributors ===
- Pelle Gunnerfeldt – production, mixing
- Mike D – production (tracks 5, 6, 10)
- Kenneth Blume – production (9)
- Joakim Åhlund – additional production (10)
- Henrik Walse – art direction
- Bisse Bengtsson – photography

== Charts ==
Chart performance for The Hives Forever Forever the Hives
Chart (2025)	Peak position
Australian Albums (ARIA)	27
Austrian Albums (Ö3 Austria)	68
Belgian Albums (Ultratop Flanders)	15
Belgian Albums (Ultratop Wallonia)	14
Croatian International Albums (HDU)	27
French Albums (SNEP)	29
French Rock & Metal Albums (SNEP)	1
German Rock & Metal Albums (Offizielle Top 100)	3
Japanese Western Albums (Oricon)	22
Scottish Albums (OCC)	3
Spanish Albums (PROMUSICAE)	56
Swedish Albums (Sverigetopplistan)	5
Swiss Albums (Schweizer Hitparade)	20
UK Albums (OCC)	5
UK Independent Albums (OCC)	3
US Independent Albums (Billboard)	48
US Top Album Sales (Billboard)	13
