= Throw It on Me =

Promotional single by Timbaland featuring The Hives

from the album Shock Value
- Released: July 23, 2007
- Recorded: 2007
- Studio: Thomas Crown (Virginia Beach); Hit Factory Criteria (Miami); Studio Gröndahl (Stockholm)
- Genre: Rap rock
- Length: 2:11
- Label: Blackground; Interscope
- Songwriters: Timothy Mosley; Nate Hills; Randy Fitzsimmons
- Producer: Timbaland

Music video
- "Throw It on Me" on YouTube

"Throw It on Me" is a song by American record producer Timbaland featuring Swedish rock band The Hives. The song was released only in Australia on August 4, 2007, as a promotional single from Timbaland's second studio album Shock Value.

The song was written by Timbaland, Danja, and Randy Fitzsimmons, (Note: The Hives have a long history of crediting all of their group songwriting efforts to an unseen "honorary sixth member" named Randy Fitzsimmons, though the name itself is legally registered as a pseudonym for their guitarist Niklas Almqvist.) while production and instrumentation were helmed by Timbaland. The song utilizes disco and rock while incorporating dance and hip hop beats. Critics viewed it as one of the better rock tracks on Shock Value, though criticized it as falling short of expectations.

== Background and composition ==
"Throw It on Me" was written and produced by Timbaland, while additional writing was done by Danja and The Hives (credited to the fictitious Randy Fitsimmons). Sound engineer Demacio "Demo" Castellon handled the programming and mixing for the song; the latter took place at The Studio at The Palms Las Vegas in Paradise, Nevada. Mark Gray, James Roach and Doug Sadler assisted Castellon in mixing the song. Castellon also recorded Timbaland's vocals for the song at Thomas Crown Studios in Virginia Beach, Virginia and The Hit Factory Criteria in Miami, Florida. The Hives received their own recording engineer, Johan Gustafsson, and had their vocals recorded at Studio Gröndahl in the band's home country Sweden. Howlin' Pelle Almqvist, lead vocalist of The Hives, contributed vocals alongside Timbaland. In addition to co-writing and producing the song, Timbaland also provided every instrument. The guitars, however, were also provided by The Hives's guitarists Vigilante Carlstroem and Nicholaus Arson alongside musician Dan Warner. "Throw It on Me" merges disco and rock music with dance and hip hop beats. The song uses a jagged guitar, techno keyboards, drums and pulsating dance beats.

== Release and reception ==
"Throw It on Me" was released on August 4, 2007 as a promotional single from Shock Value (2007) only in Australia, and was released as a CD single two days later on August 6, 2007. A month later, the song appeared on the Australian Singles Chart at number fifty before falling off the following week. "Throw It on Me" received fairly positive reviews; most found the track to be the better of the rock-oriented tracks on Shock Value, but those tracks received criticism for falling short of expectations. Andrea Park of The Online Gargoyle named "Throw It on Me" one of the album's best highlights, calling it an effortless blend of rock and hip hop. David Hyland of WESH Orlando praised the vocal collaboration between Timbaland and The Hives's Pelle Almqvist and said, "He puffs up his voice like Rob Zombie and his aggressiveness on the mic keeps the cut moving. As Tim raps, Hives singer Pelle Almqvist is his Flavor Flav. He howls, yells and screeches and generally keeps the song's energy level high." Andy Kellman of AllMusic called it a "frisky, careening number that must have taken all of ten minutes to put together". Zharmer Hardimon of The Houston Chronicle claims the Swedish band renders awe on the track and wrote, "The tunes give way to what Shock Value could have been or perhaps tries to be — a genre-bending modern-day version of Quincy Jones's 1980 classic The Dude." Alexis Petridis of The Guardian expressed his disappointment in the rock-oriented tracks on Shock Value. At one point, he wrote, "The Hives must have wondered if it was really worth the journey from Fagersta just to play the guitar riff from the Elastik Band's 60s garage rocker Spazz on Throw It On Me." Evan McGarvey of Stylus Magazine called "Throw It on Me" and "Time" battlegrounds between two divergent tempos, effects drowning out the instruments we want to hear (post-punk needs a elegant, discernable bassline) and truism after truism (The Hives want to psyche up, She Wants Revenge needs a hug)."

== Plagiarism ==
In lieu of a copyright lawsuit over "Throw It On Me", Timbaland and David Cortopassi, the composer of "Spazz", which was originally recorded by The Elastik Band and released by ATCO/Atlantic and EMI, reached a settlement agreement in July 2009. Terms of the settlement are undisclosed.

== Music video ==
The music video directed by Justin Francis was shot on April 19, 2007 at Universal Studios and it featured current and former WWE Divas including Torrie Wilson, Kelly Kelly, the late 2005 WWE Raw Diva Search winner and former Survivor contestant Ashley Massaro, 2006 WWE Diva Search finalist Maryse Ouellet, Brooke Adams, and 2006 WWE Diva Search winner Layla El. The video premiered during Raw on May 21, 2007. The video looks almost like a version of Sin City, where "The Baby Faces" (a reference to the term face in pro wrestling) consisting of Torrie, Maryse and Ashley take on "Extreme Exposé" (Kelly, Brooke and Layla) in a wrestling match. Timbaland and The Hives declare a winner at the end of the video. The winner announced, however, varies. In most markets, it is said to be "The Baby Faces". However, there is a video where "Extreme Exposé" is the winner. The video clip ends with "To be continued...". The video has reached #11 on Top 20 ReVamped. It was also #76 on MTV Asia.

== Credits and personnel ==
Credits taken from the liner notes of Shock Value, Mosley Music Group, Blackground Records, Interscope Records.

Recording and mixing

- Timbaland recorded at Thomas Crown Studios in Virginia Beach, Virginia and The Hit Factory Criteria in Miami
- The Hives recorded at Studio Gröndahl in Sweden
- Mixed at The Studio at The Palms Las Vegas in Paradise, Nevada

Personnel

- Songwriting – Timothy Mosley, Timothy Clayton, Randy Fitzsimmons
- Production – Timbaland
- Recording – Demacio "Demo" Castellon, Johan Gustafsson
- Programming – Demacio "Demo" Castellon
- Mixing – Demacio "Demo" Castellon, Mark Gray (assistant), James Roach (assistant), Doug Sadler (assistant)
- Instruments – Timbaland
- Guitars – Timbaland, Vigilante Carlstroem, Nicholaus Arson, Dan Warner
- Vocals – Howlin' Pelle Almqvist

== Track listing ==
Australian CD Single

1. "Throw It On Me" (Album Version) – 2:11
2. "Throw It On Me" (Video) – 2:30

== Chart performance ==
Chart (2007)	Peak position
Australia (ARIA)	50
Australian Urban (ARIA)	9

== Release history ==
Country	Date	Format	Label
Australia	August 4, 2007	Digital download	Blackground; Interscope
Australia	August 6, 2007	CD single	Interscope
