= Barely Legal (album) =

Studio album by the Hives
- Released: 22 September 1997
- Recorded: Summer 1997
- Studio: Rub-a-Dub (Stockholm)
- Genre: Punk rock
- Length: 27:21
- Label: Burning Heart
- Producer: Pelle Gunnerfeldt

The Hives chronology
Oh Lord! When? How? (1996)	Barely Legal (1997)	A.K.A. I-D-I-O-T (1998)

Professional ratings
Review scores
Source	Rating
AllMusic	4/5 stars

Barely Legal is the debut studio album by Swedish rock band the Hives, released on 22 September 1997 through Burning Heart Records. The album's second track, "A.K.A. I-D-I-O-T", had a video produced, but it was not commercially released until it was included as an extra on some pressings of Your New Favourite Band. The band later recorded an EP by the same name. The album sleeve features three quotations from fake newspaper reviews. These quotations are originally from British newspapers referring to the Aldous Huxley novel Brave New World.

== Track listing ==
All tracks are written by Randy Fitzsimmons, except where noted.

No.	Title	Writer(s)	Length
1.	"Well, Well, Well"		1:02
2.	"A.K.A. I-D-I-O-T"		2:12
3.	"Here We Go Again"		2:12
4.	"I'm a Wicked One"		1:45
5.	"Automatic Schmuck"		2:17
6.	"King of Asskissing"		1:46
7.	"Hail Hail Spit N' Drool"		1:27
8.	"Black Jack"	Mike Chandler; Mike Mariconda; Mike Tchang	2:45
9.	"What's That Spell?... Go to Hell!"		1:41
10.	"Theme from..."		2:49
11.	"Uptempo Venomous Poison"		1:13
12.	"Oh Lord! When? How?"		1:42
13.	"The Stomp"		1:54
14.	"Closed for the Season"		2:34

- "Black Jack" is a cover of a song by Rauch Hands.

== Personnel ==
Personnel taken from Barely Legal liner notes.

The Hives

- Howlin' Pelle Almqvist – vocals
- Nicholaus Arson – guitar
- Vigilante Carlstroem – guitar
- Dr. Matt Destruction – bass guitar
- Chris Dangerous – drums

Additional personnel

- Pelle Gunnerfeldt – recording
- Tonteknik – mastering
