= Walk Idiot Walk =

2004 single by the Hives

Single by the Hives

from the album Tyrannosaurus Hives
- B-side: "Genepool Convulsions"
- Released: 14 June 2004
- Length: 3:31
- Label: Polydor
- Songwriter: Randy Fitzsimmons
- Producers: The Hives; Pelle Gunnerfeldt

The Hives singles chronology
"Die, All Right! / Supply and Demand" (2002)	"Walk Idiot Walk" (2004)	"Two-Timing Touch and Broken Bones" (2004)

"Walk Idiot Walk" is the first single released from Swedish band the Hives' third album, Tyrannosaurus Hives (2004). It was written by Randy Fitzsimmons and produced by the Hives with Pelle Gunnerfeldt. Upon its release in June 2004, the song reached number 13 in the United Kingdom, number 15 in Sweden, and number 18 in Norway. It also reached number 19 on the US Billboard Modern Rock Tracks chart. In Australia, the song was ranked number 55 on Triple J's Hottest 100 of 2004.

== Music video ==
The video takes place in a white room with crossword puzzle designs on the wall. Before the music starts, there's a sign with a large "!", the Hives appear. In the middle of the music video, Pelle Almqvist begins to walk on the wall, as he steps on the crossword designs, letters appear soon after, reading "Walk Idiot Walk".

== Track listings ==
All lyrics are written by Howlin' Pelle Almqvist.

European CD single and UK 7-inch single
No.	Title	Length
1.	"Walk Idiot Walk"	3:31
2.	"Genepool Convulsions"	2:14
Total length:		5:45

Standard maxi-CD single
No.	Title	Length
1.	"Walk Idiot Walk"	3:31
2.	"Genepool Convulsions"	2:14
3.	"Keel-Hauling Class of '89"	2:42
4.	"Walk Idiot Walk" (video)
Total length:		8:27

== Charts ==
=== Weekly charts ===
Chart (2004)	Peak position
Australia (ARIA)	75
Canada Rock Top 30 (Radio & Records)	25
Germany (GfK)	78
Ireland (IRMA)	45
Norway (VG-lista)	18
Scotland Singles (OCC)	13
Sweden (Sverigetopplistan)	15
UK Singles (OCC)	13
US Alternative Airplay (Billboard)	19
US Mainstream Rock (Billboard)	36

=== Year-end charts ===
Chart (2004)	Position
US Modern Rock Tracks (Billboard)	80

== Release history ==
Region	Date	Format(s)	Label(s)	Ref(s).
United States	14 June 2004	Active rock; alternative radio	Interscope	
United Kingdom	5 July 2004	CD	Polydor	

== In popular culture ==
It was featured in a season 4 episode, "Jinx", of Smallville. It was used in the season two episode, "My Mother the Fiend" of Veronica Mars. It was used as the theme song for the 2004 WWE Raw Diva Search which later became the theme to former Diva Search winner and TNA Knockout, Christy Hemme. The main riff is similar to that of The Who's "I Can't Explain", and even more similar to Sonic 2's Metropolis Zone. The song also features in Guitar Rock Tour.
