= Your New Favourite Band =

Compilation album by The Hives
- Released: 22 October 2001
- Recorded: 1997–2000
- Genre: Garage punk; garage rock; punk rock
- Length: 28:08
- Label: Poptones; Burning Heart; Epitaph; Sire; Reprise
- Producer: Pelle Gunderfelt; Freddy Flame

The Hives chronology
Veni Vidi Vicious (2000)	Your New Favourite Band (2001)	Tyrannosaurus Hives (2004)

Singles from Your New Favourite Band
- 1. "Hate to Say I Told You So" Released: 2002; 2. "Main Offender" Released: 2002; 3. "Die, All Right!/Supply and Demand" Released: 2002

Professional ratings
Review scores
Source	Rating
AllMusic	4.5/5 stars
NME	6/10
Pitchfork	7.7/10
Rock Sound	4/5 stars
The Rolling Stone Album Guide	4/5 stars

Your New Favourite Band is a collection by The Hives released in 2001, featuring tracks from their first two albums and the A.K.A. I-D-I-O-T EP. It was released by Alan McGee's Poptones record label, which was licensed the band's songs by Burning Heart Records. The decision to release such a compilation was made with the intention of achieving mainstream success in the UK and other territories.

== Track listing ==
All tracks are written by Randy Fitzsimmons

No.	Title	Length
1.	"Hate to Say I Told You So"	3:22
2.	"Main Offender"	2:33
3.	"Supply and Demand"	2:26
4.	"Die, All Right!"	2:45
5.	"Untutored Youth"	1:34
6.	"Outsmarted"	2:21
7.	"Mad Man"	2:29
8.	"Here We Go Again"	2:12
9.	"A.K.A. I-D-I-O-T"	2:11
10.	"Automatic Schmuck"	2:17
11.	"Hail Hail Spit N' Drool"	1:26
12.	"The Hives Are Law, You Are Crime"	2:31
Total length:		28:08

== Charts ==
=== Weekly charts ===
Weekly charts performance for Your New Favourite Band
Chart (2001–2002)	Peak position
Australian Albums (ARIA)	19
Irish Albums (IRMA)	14
New Zealand Albums (RMNZ)	21
Scottish Albums (OCC)	4
UK Albums (OCC)	7

=== Year-end charts ===
Year-end charts performance for Your New Favourite Band
Chart (2002)	Position
UK Albums (OCC)	69
