= Main Offender (song) =

2001 single by the Hives

Single by The Hives

from the album Veni Vidi Vicious
- Released: 2001
- Genre: Garage punk
- Length: 2:33
- Label: Burning Heart; Sweet Nothing; Poptones; Hard-On
- Songwriter: Randy Fitzsimmons
- Producer: Pelle Gunderfelt

The Hives singles chronology
"Hate to Say I Told You So" (2000)	"Main Offender" (2001)	"Supply and Demand" (2001)

"Main Offender" is a song from The Hives' second album, Veni Vidi Vicious, as the fourth track. It was released again on the compilation Your New Favourite Band. Nicholaus Arson notes the song as a favorite.

The song reached number 24 in the UK Singles Chart in May 2002. This was a re-release, the single having failed to chart when it was originally released in 2000.

== Track listing ==
2001 and 2002 CD and 7" Single
No.	Title	Length
1.	"Main Offender"	2:35
2.	"Lost And Found"	3:25
3.	"Howlin' Pelle Talks To The Kids"	2:21
Total length:		8:21

2002 Enhanced CD
No.	Title	Length
1.	"Main Offender"	2:35
2.	"Lost And Found"	3:25
3.	"Hate To Say I Told You So (Live On Top Of The Pops)"	3:44
4.	"Hate To Say I Told You So (Live On Top Of The Pops)" (music video)	-
Total length:		9:44

2002 Swedish Minimax CD
No.	Title	Length
1.	"Main Offender"	2:35
2.	"Lost And Found"	3:25
3.	"Howlin' Pelle Talks To The Kids"	2:21
4.	"Die, Alright!" (music video)	-
5.	"Hate To Say I Told You So" (music video)	-
6.	"Main Offender" (music video)	-
Total length:		8:21

== Video ==
The music video is shot in black and white, in harmony with their recurring theme. It is made up of several image cut-outs, and video of the band for each shot, like an animated comic book, and involves them making their way through a town called "Punkrock city" to defeat some evil clones of them named: "The Negatives" . The video opens with newspapers praising The Negatives and mysterious manager Randy Fitzsimmons' hand is seen signing some sort of contract. He is then briefly seen giving an interview where he is quoted as saying: "Punkrock city is not big enough for both! The Hives are law, Negatives are crime, Capisce?" The members of the Hives are then seen on several phone calls to each other across the city, which lead to the band meeting up, getting into a car, and racing out of the city, towards a mansion where The Negatives are going to play a gig. They storm into the Mansion, jumping over cracks in the floor while the songs lyrics go overhead, and getting off an elevator. They then proceed to punch up The Negatives and walk out onto the balcony where The Negatives had been scheduled to play, where they are greeted by a large crowd of cheering people. A poster with "The Hives" written on it drops down and a drum count in starts before the video is cut off, ending.
