= The Hives =

Swedish rock band

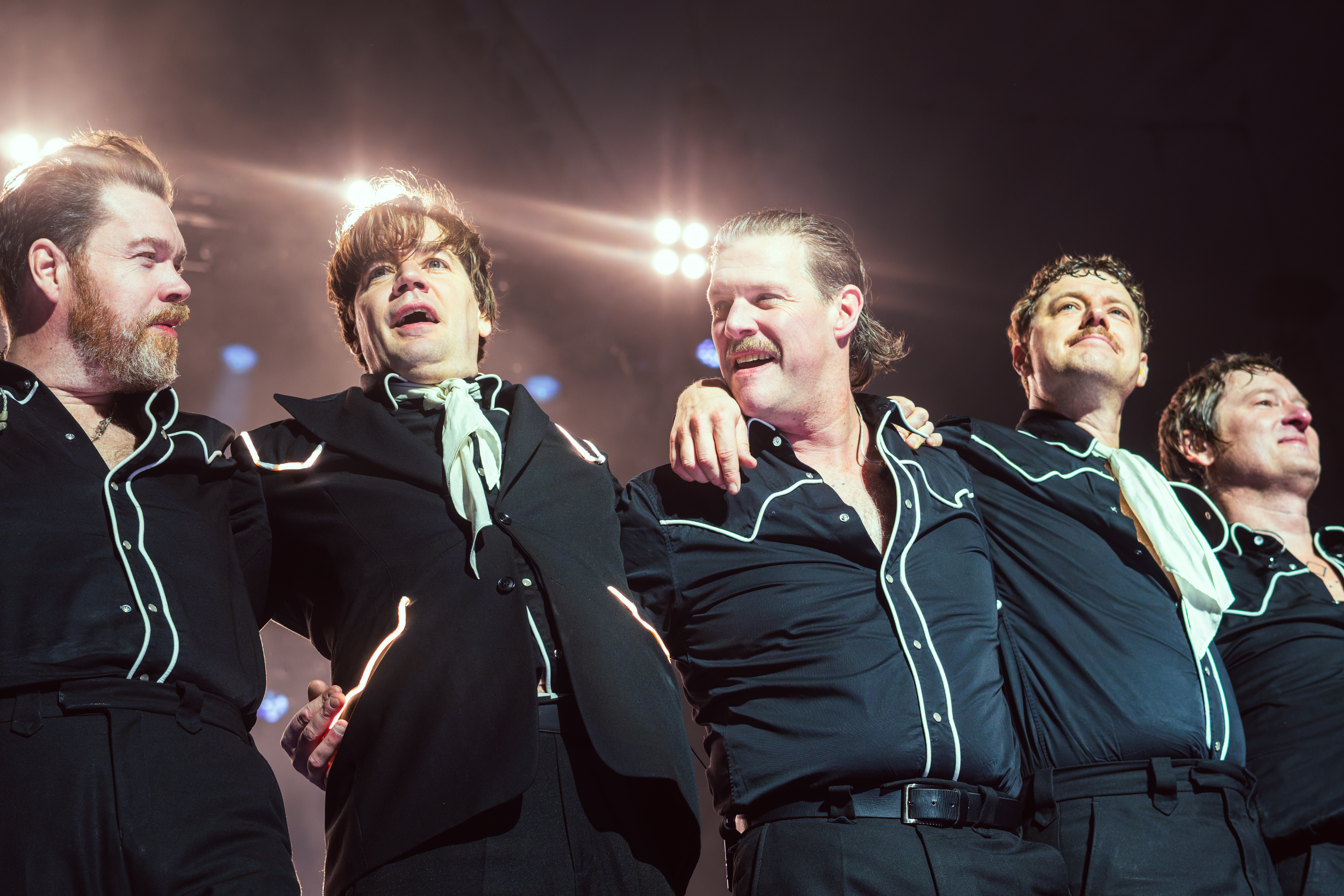
- The Hives in 2025

Background information
- Origin: Fagersta, Västmanland, Sweden
- Genres: Garage rock revival; garage punk
- Works: The Hives discography
- Years active: 1993–present
- Labels: Disques Hives; PIAS; Polydor; A&M/Octone; Interscope; Columbia; Universal; Epitaph; Burning Heart; Third Man
- Members: Howlin' Pelle Almqvist; Nicholaus Arson; Vigilante Carlstroem; Chris Dangerous; The Johan and Only
- Past members: Dr. Matt Destruction
- Website: thehives.com

The Hives are a Swedish garage rock band formed in Fagersta in 1993. After gaining success in Sweden during the 1990s, they rose to worldwide prominence in the early 2000s during the garage rock revival. The band's line-up—consisting of Howlin' Pelle Almqvist (vocals), Nicholaus Arson (lead guitar, backing vocals), Vigilante Carlstroem (rhythm guitar, backing vocals), Dr. Matt Destruction (bass), and Chris Dangerous (drums)—remained unchanged from 1993 until 2013, when Matt Destruction retired for health reasons and was replaced by Johan Gustafsson (known in The Hives as The Johan and Only), the bassist for Randy.

The Hives have released seven studio albums: Barely Legal (1997), Veni Vidi Vicious (2000), Tyrannosaurus Hives (2004), The Black and White Album (2007), Lex Hives (2012), The Death of Randy Fitzsimmons (2023), and The Hives Forever Forever The Hives (2025). They have also released the compilation album Your New Favourite Band (2001), the live DVD Tussles in Brussels (2005), and the live album Live at Third Man Records (2020). Their mainstream success came with the release of Veni Vidi Vicious and its single "Hate to Say I Told You So", considered their signature song. They are known for always dressing in matching black-and-white tuxedos and for their energetic and eccentric live shows, with critics hailing them as one of the best live rock bands of the last two decades.

== History ==
=== Beginnings of the Hives (1993–1999) ===
The Hives was formed in 1993 by brothers Per "Pelle" Almqvist (Howlin' Pelle Almqvist) and Niklas Almqvist (Nicholaus Arson) in Fagersta. Friends of the brothers, Mikael Karlsson (Vigilante Carlstroem), Mattias Bernvall (Dr. Matt Destruction) and Christian Grahn (Chris Dangerous), soon joined the band and took stage names like the brothers. Drummer Dangerous suggested the name "Hives" for the band as he had read the word for the skin disease in a dictionary. The other members misunderstood the condition based on his description of it, as Howlin' Pelle later explained, "we thought it was a way more lethal disease, for one, and we thought it was way more contagious. So, we figured that we'd spread like a deadly disease across the land". The band went by the name Hives for some time before they realized that "all good band names are plurals", and added a 'the' to their name.

The band's first recording was a 1994 demo titled Sounds Like Sushi. In 1995, the band signed with Burning Heart Records, a Swedish independent record label. The following year they released their debut EP Oh Lord! When? How? In 1997, the band released their debut studio album, Barely Legal, and embarked on a tour in support of it. The Barely Legal track "The Stomp" was later featured on the soundtrack of the film RocknRolla. The band's early releases would be marked by the influence of such bands as Rancid, New Bomb Turks, Turbonegro, and Dead Kennedys.

In 1998, the band released their second EP, A.K.A. I-D-I-O-T. Burning Heart signed a deal with Epitaph Records to distribute the band's material in the United States during that same year.

=== Veni Vidi Vicious and Your New Favourite Band (2000–2002) ===
The Hives released their second studio album, Veni Vidi Vicious, in April 2000 through Burning Heart Records. The band members described the album as being like "a velvet glove with brass knuckles, both brutal and sophisticated at the same time". The album yielded the singles "Hate to Say I Told You So", "Main Offender", "Die, All Right!", and "Supply and Demand". The album track "The Hives – Introduce the Metric System in Time" was included on the punk rock compilation album Punk-O-Rama Volume 5 from Epitaph later that year. "Hate To Say I Told You So" was later included on the soundtrack for Spider-Man, and also featured in the video game Forza Horizon . The track "Main Offender" was featured in the video game Rock Band while "Die, All Right!" was released as downloadable content in the game's digital music store.

After seeing the video for "Hate to Say I Told You So" on German television, industry executive Alan McGee decided to sign the band to his newly formed Poptones label. Poptones released the 'best of' compilation Your New Favourite Band in 2001, which proved to be the band's breakthrough record, reaching number seven on the UK album charts. Following the success of the album, the band re-released the singles "Hate to Say I Told You So" and "Main Offender", which reached number 23 and 24 respectively on the UK Singles Chart. The band also re-released Veni Vidi Vicious in the US.

During the promotion of Veni Vidi Vicious and Your New Favourite Band, the Hives signed a record deal with Universal Music, reportedly worth $10 million. The signing was a result of Epitaph selling the rights to the band's material in the US to Warner Bros. Records without informing the members beforehand. A dispute followed between the Hives and the labels, who claimed that the band were still contracted for one more album, in which a lawsuit was filed against the band and settled out of court.

=== Tyrannosaurus Hives (2003–2006) ===
After extensive touring and winning awards for Best International Band and Best-Dressed Band at the NME Awards in 2003, the band retreated to Fagersta to record their third album.Tyrannosaurus Hives was released in 2004 and included the singles "Walk Idiot Walk", which debuted at number 13 on the UK singles charts, "Two-Timing Touch and Broken Bones", a top 50 hit, and "A Little More for Little You". The tracks "B is for Brutus" and "Uptight" were featured in the video game Gran Turismo 4, while "No Pun Intended" was featured in the video games SSX on Tour and Motorstorm: Pacific Rift.

In 2005, the band won five Swedish Grammis awards in the categories Artist of the Year, Rock Group of the Year, Album of the Year and Producer of the Year (with collaborator Pelle Gunnerfeldt), while the video for "Walk Idiot Walk" won the MTV Best Music Video award.

=== The Black and White Album (2007–2011) ===
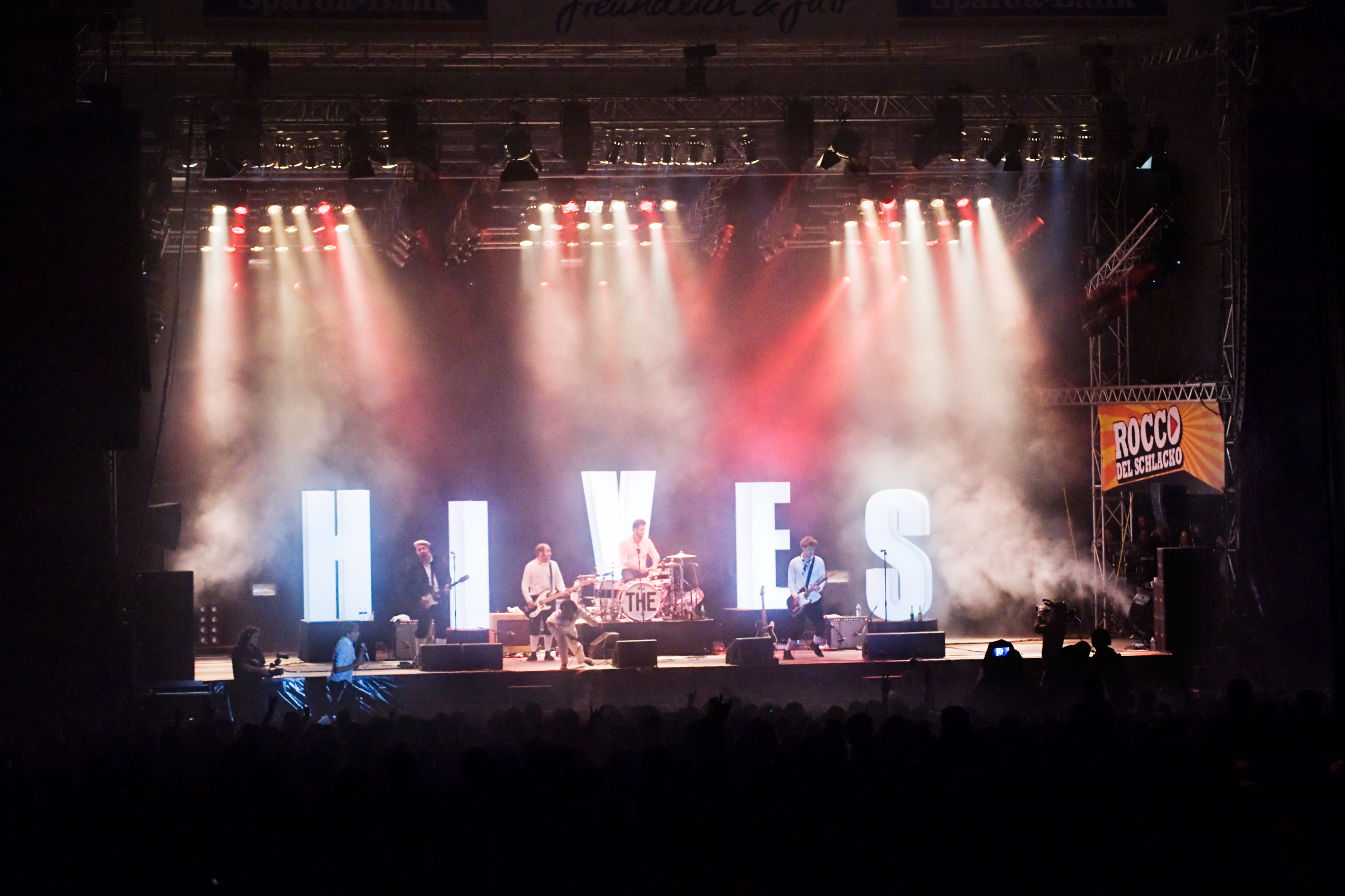
The Hives performing at the Rocco del Schlacko festival in 2010

The Hives announced their new album in August 2007 along with the album's first single, "Tick Tick Boom". The Black and White Album was released on 15 October in the UK and on 13 November in the US. It was mostly recorded in Oxford, Mississippi, Miami, and Sweden. The bonus track "Fall Is Just Something Grownups Invented" was used as the theme for Cartoon Network's fall season while the band performed in commercials featuring the song.

"Return The Favour" was featured in a Nike commercial, while "Tick Tick Boom" was used in the films Jumper, Taken, MacGruber, and Get Smart, as the theme song for WWE Survivor Series 2007, in advertisements for the 2007 season of the NFL Network and Finish Line, and included in the video games Lego: Rock Band, Madden NFL 07, Madden NFL 11 and MotorStorm: Arctic Edge. The track "Try It Again" was later used in the trailer for the film Get Him to the Greek. In 2008, specific songs from the band's catalog was remixed and compiled into a track titled "Black, White and Run" for the Nike+ Original Run series.

In January 2008, the band received the "Best Live Act" award at the Swedish Grammis and performed at the 2008 NHL All-Star Game in Atlanta, performing "Tick Tick Boom" during the players' presentation. In July 2010, the band released an EP titled Tarred and Feathered, which consisted of the cover songs "Civilization's Dying" by Zero Boys, "Nasty Secretary" by Joy Rider & Avis Davis and "Early Morning Wake Up Call" by Flash and the Pan. "Nasty Secretary" was later included on the video game Gran Turismo 5's soundtrack. In January 2011, guitarist Arson wrote a short diary entry on the band's website stating that they had recorded some new songs before Christmas, and were planning to continue recording throughout month.

=== Lex Hives and Destruction's departure (2012–2023) ===
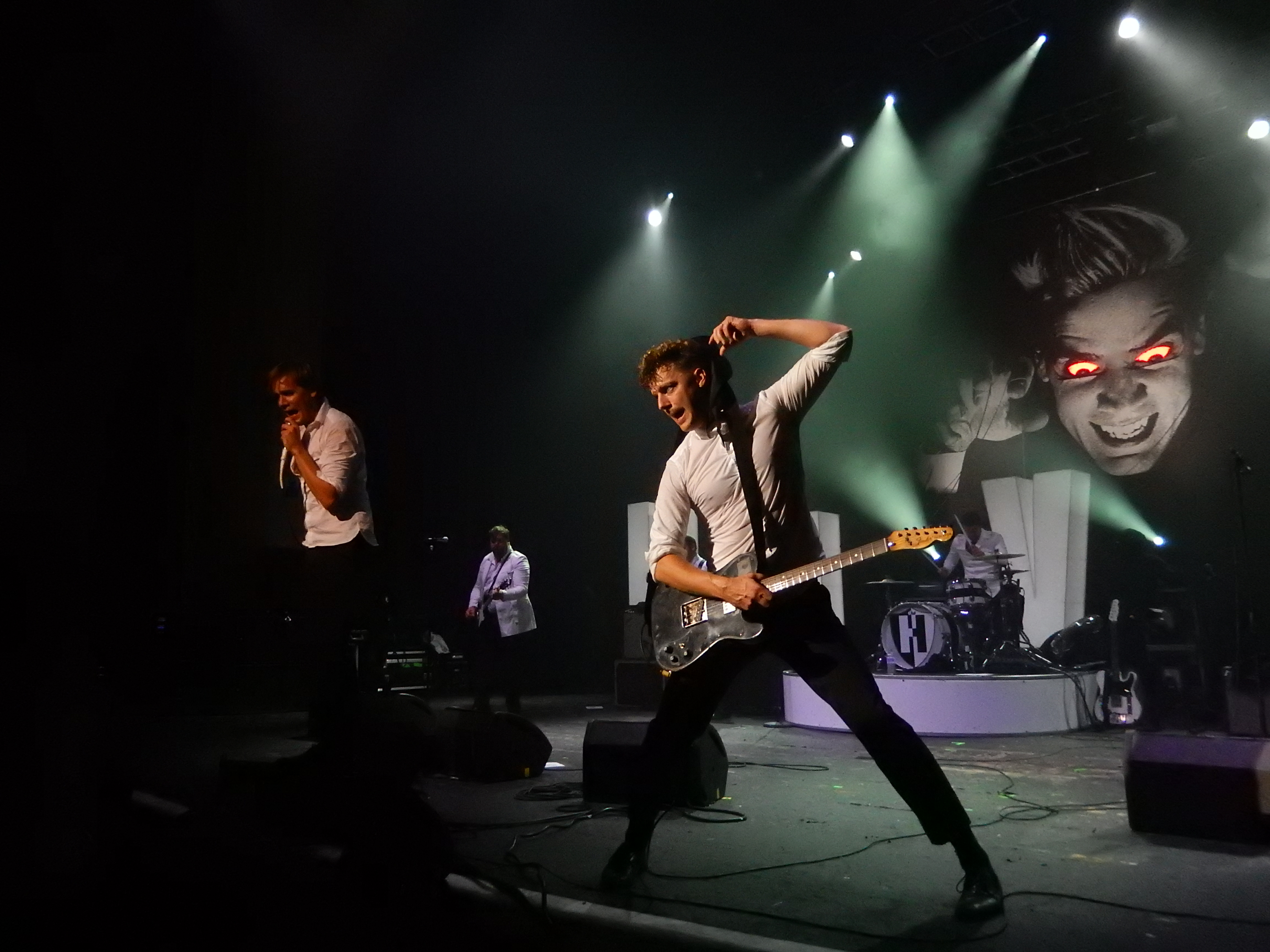
The Hives performing at Brixton Academy in 2014

In March 2012, the band announced their fifth studio album, Lex Hives, and released the first single from the album "Go Right Ahead". The song was performed live during an appearance at the Norwegian-Swedish talk show Skavlan on 30 March. After a run of live shows in California and two weekend shows at Coachella, the band performed on Jimmy Kimmel Live! on 23 April.

Lex Hives was released on the band's own label, Disque Hives, in June and included twelve self-produced tracks, with a deluxe version containing two bonus tracks produced by Queens of the Stone Age frontman Josh Homme. The album track "Come On!" was used as the theme for Xbox One's "Invitation" commercials, and featured in an episode of Workaholics and the documentary The Crash Reel, while the song "1000 Answers," was included on the soundtrack of the video game FIFA 12.

Due to health reasons, Dr. Matt Destruction left the band in late 2013 and was replaced by Randy bassist Johan Gustafsson, who took the stage name The Johan and Only. On 13 February 2015, the band released the stand-alone single "Blood Red Moon". The band's activity became limited between 2015 and 2019, with appearances largely reduced to occasional festival appearances. These included Riot Fest, Rock am Ring, Lollapalooza Paris and Download Festival.

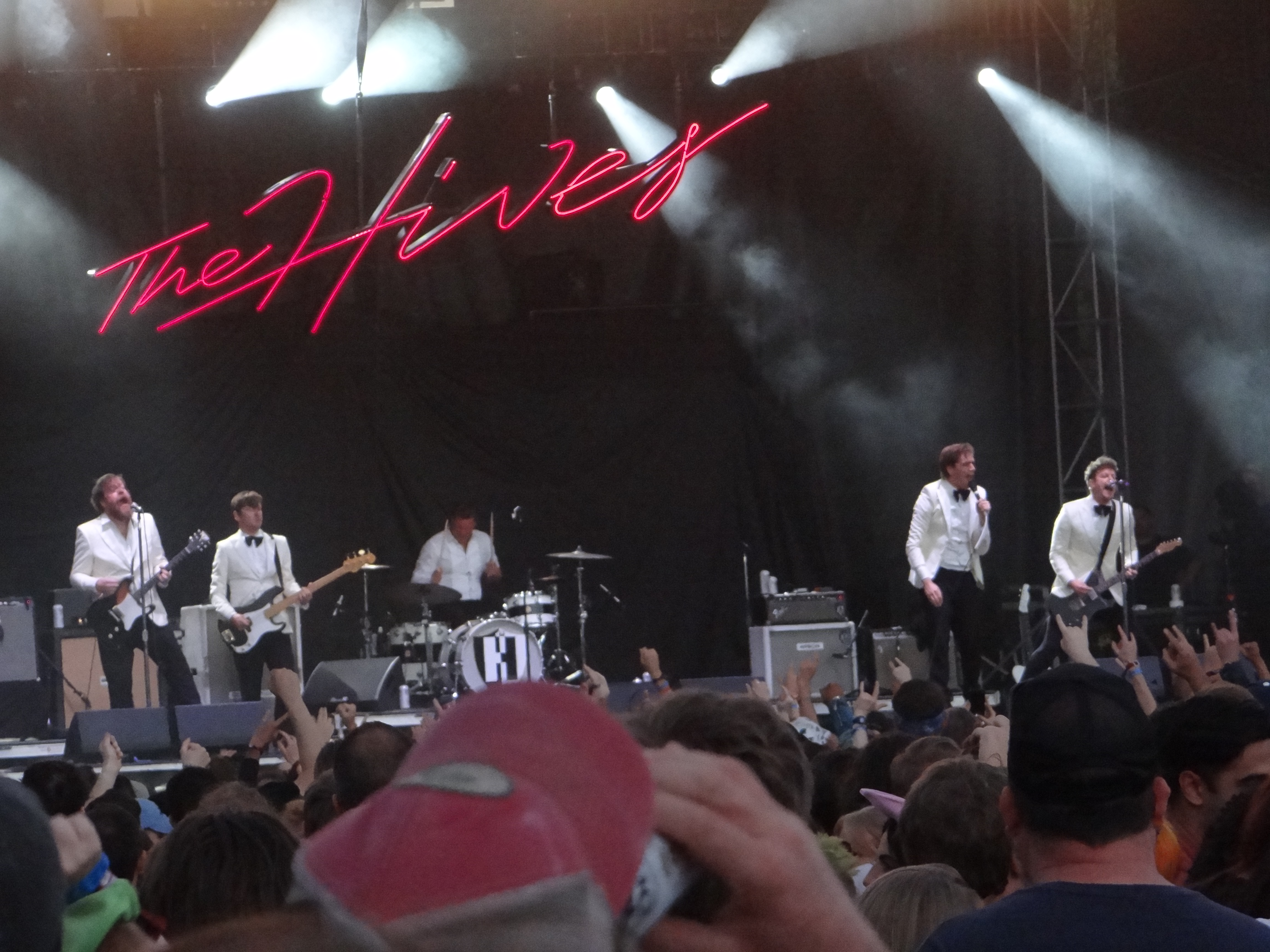
The Hives performing at the 2021 Shaky Knees Music Festival

In May 2019, the band released the single "I'm Alive" and followed it up with another single titled "Good Samaritan" a month later. The band toured the US in 2019 alongside fellow Swedish band Refused, with the run of dates dubbed the Scream Team Tour. Drummer Dangerous took a hiatus from the band during this period to recover from surgery and was replaced on the tour by former Queens of the Stone Age drummer Joey Castillo. While on tour, the Hives recorded their first live album, Live at Third Man Records, which was later released on 25 September 2020.

After being unable to tour in 2020 due to the COVID-19 pandemic, the band created a virtual world tour in January 2021 titled the World's First World Wide Web World Tour which saw them perform live-streamed sets at country-specific times, with "shows" in Berlin, London, New York City, Sydney, São Paulo and Stockholm. The band returned to real-life touring later in 2021, serving as the opener on The Offspring's UK and European tour dates.

=== The Death of Randy Fitzsimmons and The Hives Forever Forever the Hives (2023–present) ===
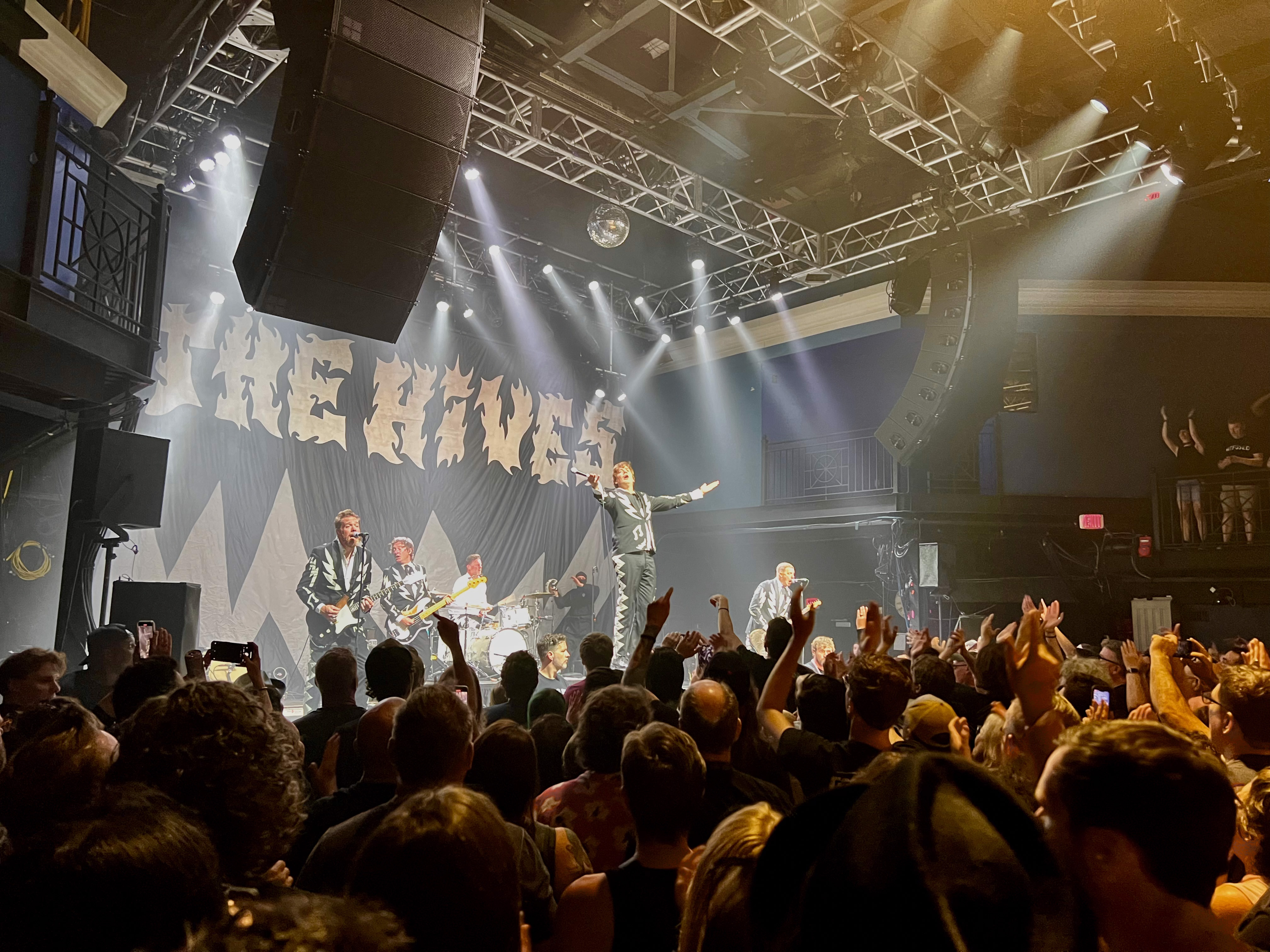
The Hives at the 9:30 Club in July 2024

In January 2023, the band shared a series of photos in which Howlin' Pelle held up protest signs on Hollywood Boulevard that read "The Hives Must Album Now!" and "Honk If You Want a New The Hives Album". A new series of merch was also shared, featuring both the former slogan and one that read "The Hives! Make Records or Go Home!" A second set of photos was shared in early February, with Almqvist now holding a sign that read "Where Is the New The Hives Album". The campaign continued with photos of Arson, Carlstroem and Dangerous "joining the protest" and wearing the new merch.

In May 2023, the band confirmed that their sixth studio album, The Death of Randy Fitzsimmons, would be released on 11 August 2023. The band also shared the album's lead single "Bogus Operandi", marking their first new release in four years. That same month, the band began a tour of the UK and Ireland in support of Arctic Monkeys. A second single from the album, "Countdown to Shutdown", followed in June 2023. Its music video featured a cameo from the band's former bassist Dr. Matt Destruction, who played an office worker. Prior to the release of the album, the Hives released a further three singles: "Rigor Mortis Radio", "Trapdoor Solution", and "The Bomb". The Hives later embarked on a global tour in support of the album throughout Europe and America that concluded in 2024.

On 1 April 2025, the band released their lead single, "Enough Is Enough", and announced that their seventh studio album titled The Hives Forever Forever the Hives would be released 29 August 2025, followed by a world tour. The album was produced by Pelle Gunnerfeldt and Mike D at Yung Lean and Benny Andersson's studios and involved Queens of the Stone Age bandleader Josh Homme in an advisory role. On 10 June 2025, the band announced on social media that a new single, "Paint A Picture", would be released on 17 June 2025. On 4 July 2025, the band announced the release of a third single on social media, "Legalize Living", to be released on 7 July 2025.

== Collaborations ==
In 2006, Almqvist collaborated with Swedish rock artist Moneybrother on a cover of the Operation Ivy song "Freeze Up" for his cover album Pengabrorsan. The duo replaced the song's original lyrics with Swedish lyrics and retitled it to "Jag Skriver Inte På Nåt" (Swedish for "I Won't Sign Anything"). The Hives collaborated with hip-hop producer Timbaland on the track "Throw It On Me" from his 2007 album Shock Value. The band also featured in the track's music video. During that same year, Howlin' Pelle posted in the online diary on the band's website that he had recorded footsteps with Jack White for the Raconteurs’ new album.

In 2008, the Hives contributed to the tracks "Time For Some Action" and "Windows" from N.E.R.D.'s album Seeing Sounds, with Almqvist providing guest vocals on the former. The members are credited by their real names on the album instead of the pseudonyms they use within the band. Later that year, the band recorded a Christmas duet entitled "A Christmas Duel" with Cyndi Lauper, which was available as a free download from their website on 28 November.

In 2018, the Almqvist brothers gifted the song "Let the Punishment Fit the Behind" to the Norwegian rock band Turbonegro for their album RockNRoll Machine. Howlin' Pelle performed the song live with the band during their concert in Stockholm on 9 March. In 2019, the singer contributed backing vocals to the track "Turn the Cross" from Swedish punk band Refused's album War Music.

== Style and onstage performance ==
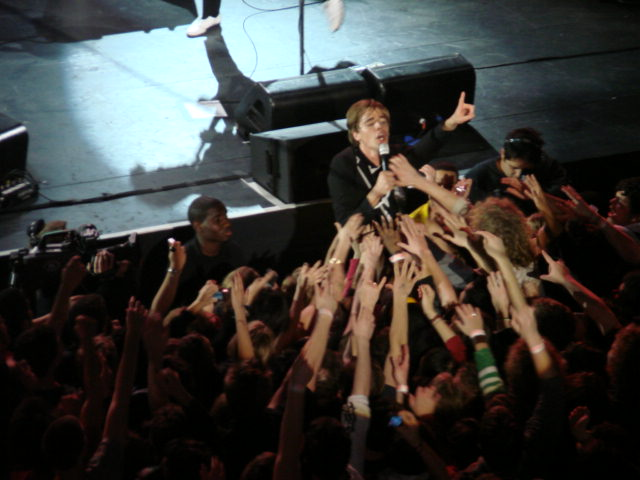
Almqvist interacting with fans during a concert in New York City in 2008

All songwriting except covers on the band's albums are credited to "Randy Fitzsimmons". The band claims Fitzsimmons was an honorary "sixth Hive", who along with writing their music, discovered and managed the band. The band has included hidden references to a sixth member of the band, including a hidden sixth pair of legs on the back cover of the Tyrannosaurus Hives album art. "Randy Fitzsimmons" is a registered pseudonym for guitarist Niklas Almqvist.

The Hives are renowned for their energetic and highly rated live shows, with Spin ranking them number eight on their list of best live bands in 2006 and frontman Howlin' Pelle receiving particular praise for his showmanship. When asked about their efforts to connect with the audience, drummer Dangerous replied that "there are so many bands out there that don't say a word to the crowd. I don't get it. They don't even look at the audience and that's ridiculous". In 2023, Howlin' Pelle commented on the effects of their live shows saying "we give so much energy and then it kind of bounces right back. So on one hand your body gets tired but your soul feels better and better. So it's not just tiring, like it also gives you a lot of energy". The Hives always dress in matching black-and-white tuxedos because "it makes [them] look like [they] belong together".

== Band members ==
Current members

- Howlin' Pelle Almqvist (Per Almqvist) – lead vocals (1993–present)
- Nicholaus Arson (Niklas Almqvist) – lead guitar, backing vocals (1993–present)
- Vigilante Carlstroem (Mikael Karlsson) – rhythm guitar, backing vocals (1993–present)
- Chris Dangerous (Christian Grahn) – drums, percussion (Note: Live, Dangerous' percussion parts are played by the band's roadies, who dress as ninjas.) (1993–present; hiatus 2019)
- The Johan and Only (Johan Gustafsson) – bass guitar (2013–present)

Former members

- Dr. Matt Destruction (Mattias Bernvall) – bass guitar (1993–2013)

Former touring musicians

- Joey Castillo – drums (2019)

== Discography ==
Studio albums

- Barely Legal (1997)
- Veni Vidi Vicious (2000)
- Tyrannosaurus Hives (2004)
- The Black and White Album (2007)
- Lex Hives (2012)
- The Death of Randy Fitzsimmons (2023)
- The Hives Forever Forever the Hives (2025)

== Awards and nominations ==
Award ceremony	Year	Category	Nominee/work	Result
Berlin Music Video Awards	2024	Best Bizarre	"Bogus Operandi"	Won
Grammis	2002	Music Video of the Year	"Main Offender"	Won
Grammis	2005	Album of the Year	Tyrannosaurus Hives	Won
Grammis	2005	Producer of the Year	Themselves (shared with Pelle Gunnerfeldt)	Won
Grammis	2005	Artist of the Year	Themselves	Won
Grammis	2005	Rock of the Year - Group	Themselves	Won
Grammis	2008	Live of the Year	Themselves	Won
Grammis	2024	Rock of the Year	Themselves	Nominated
Grammis	2024	Music Video of the Year	"Countdown to Shutdown"	Won
Grammis	2025	Music Video of the Year	"Rigor Mortis Radio"	Nominated
MTV Video Music Awards	2002	MTV2 Award	"Hate to Say I Told You So"	Nominated
MTV Europe Music Awards	2002	Best Nordic Act	Themselves	Nominated
