= Veni Vidi Vicious =

Studio album by The Hives
- Released: 10 April 2000
- Recorded: Late 1999
- Studios: Pelle's Studio (Sweden); Studio Kuling (Örebro)
- Genres: Garage rock revival; garage punk; punk rock
- Length: 27:55
- Labels: Burning Heart; Epitaph
- Producer: Pelle Gunnerfelt

The Hives chronology
A Killer Among Us (1998)	Veni Vidi Vicious (2000)	Your New Favourite Band (2001)

Singles from Veni Vidi Vicious
- 1. "Hate to Say I Told You So" Released: 20 November 2000; 2. "Main Offender" Released: 3 September 2001; 3. "Supply and Demand" Released: 24 September 2001; 4. "Die, All Right!" Released: 2001

Veni Vidi Vicious is the second studio album by Swedish rock band the Hives. The album was released on 10 April 2000 through Burning Heart and Epitaph. It was later re-released on 30 April 2002 through Sire and Gearhead. The Japanese release included several extra tracks and other bonus features. The album's title is a play on words which refers to the sentence written by Julius Caesar after conquering Asia Minor in 47 B.C.: "Veni, vidi, vici." (In English: "I came, I saw, I conquered.") and a reference to the surname of punk band Sex Pistols' bassist Sid Vicious. The album received universal acclaim from music critics, earning an average critic score of 84/100 on Metacritic.

== Reception ==
Professional ratings
Aggregate scores
Source	Rating
Metacritic	84/100
Review scores
Source	Rating
AllMusic	4.5/5 stars
Alternative Press	8/10
Blender	4/5 stars
Entertainment Weekly	B
IGN	8/10
Pitchfork	7.4/10
Rolling Stone	4/5 stars
The Rolling Stone Album Guide	4.5/5 stars
Stylus Magazine	A
The Village Voice	A−

In 2005, Veni Vidi Vicious was ranked number 399 in Rock Hard magazine's book The 500 Greatest Rock & Metal Albums of All Time. The album was ranked number 91 on Rolling Stone's list of the top 100 albums of the decade. Subsequently, "Hate to Say I Told You So" was ranked number 244 on Pitchfork's list of the top 500 songs of 2000–2009.

== Commercial performance ==
As of 2006 the album has sold 416,000 copies in United States. In Europe it has sold over 250,000 copies. The album reached number 71 on the Canadian Albums Chart.

== Track listing ==
All songs written by Randy Fitzsimmons, except "Find Another Girl", written by Jerry Butler and Curtis Mayfield.

Veni Vidi Vicious track listing
No.	Title	Length
1.	"The Hives – Declare Guerre Nucleaire"	1:35
2.	"Die, All Right!"	2:46
3.	"A Get Together to Tear It Apart"	1:52
4.	"Main Offender"	2:33
5.	"Outsmarted"	2:22
6.	"Hate to Say I Told You So"	3:22
7.	"The Hives – Introduce the Metric System in Time"	2:06
8.	"Find Another Girl"	3:12
9.	"Statecontrol"	1:54
10.	"Inspection Wise 1999"	1:37
11.	"Knock Knock"	2:10
12.	"Supply and Demand"	2:26

== Personnel ==
The Hives

- Howlin' Pelle Almqvist – vocals
- Nicholaus Arson – lead guitar (credited as "treble")
- Vigilante Carlstroem – rhythm guitar (credited as "middle")
- Dr. Matt Destruction – bass guitar
- Chris Dangerous – drums (credited as "rythm")

Additional musicians

- Jari Haapalainen – tambourines
- Kalle – synthesizers

Technical

- Pelle Gunnerfeldt – producer, engineer
- Fredrik Holmstedt – engineer
- Johanna Arson – artwork
- Nicholaus Arson – artwork
- Jonas Gauffin – photography

== Charts ==
=== Weekly charts ===
Weekly chart performance for Veni Vidi Vicious
Chart (2000–2002)	Peak position
Swedish Albums (Sverigetopplistan)	50
US Billboard 200	63

=== Year-end charts ===
Year-end chart performance for Veni Vidi Vicious
Chart (2002)	Position
Canadian Alternative Albums (Nielsen SoundScan)	73
Canadian Metal Albums (Nielsen SoundScan)	34

== Certifications and sales ==
Certifications and sales for Veni Vidi Vicious
Region	Certification	Certified units/sales
Sweden (GLF)	Gold	40,000^{^}
United States	—	416,000
Summaries
Europe	—	250,000
^{^} Shipments figures based on certification alone.
