= Christian Grahn =

Swedish drummer

Chris Dangerous
- Chris Dangerous in 2007

Background information
- Born: Arne Christian Jääskeläinen; 12 June 1978 (age 48); Fagersta, Västmanland, Sweden
- Genres: Alternative rock; garage punk; garage rock revival; post-punk revival
- Occupation: Drummer
- Member of: The Hives
- Website: thehivesbroadcastingservice.com

Arne Christian Jääskeläinen (born 12 June 1978), known professionally as Chris Dangerous, is a Swedish musician who is the drummer of the garage rock band The Hives.

== Biography ==
Grahn began playing drums at age of nine. Growing up in Fagersta, Västmanland, he played drums in a local band, Bad Dreams Always, a hardcore punk band. Grahn's father was part of a Finnish cover band called The Sailors, which, according to Howlin' Pelle Almqvist, The Hives' frontman, was "The biggest guitar rock band in Finland at the time." Grahn's father also sang in a band called The Ventons. Grahn is of Finnish descent.

=== Musical style ===
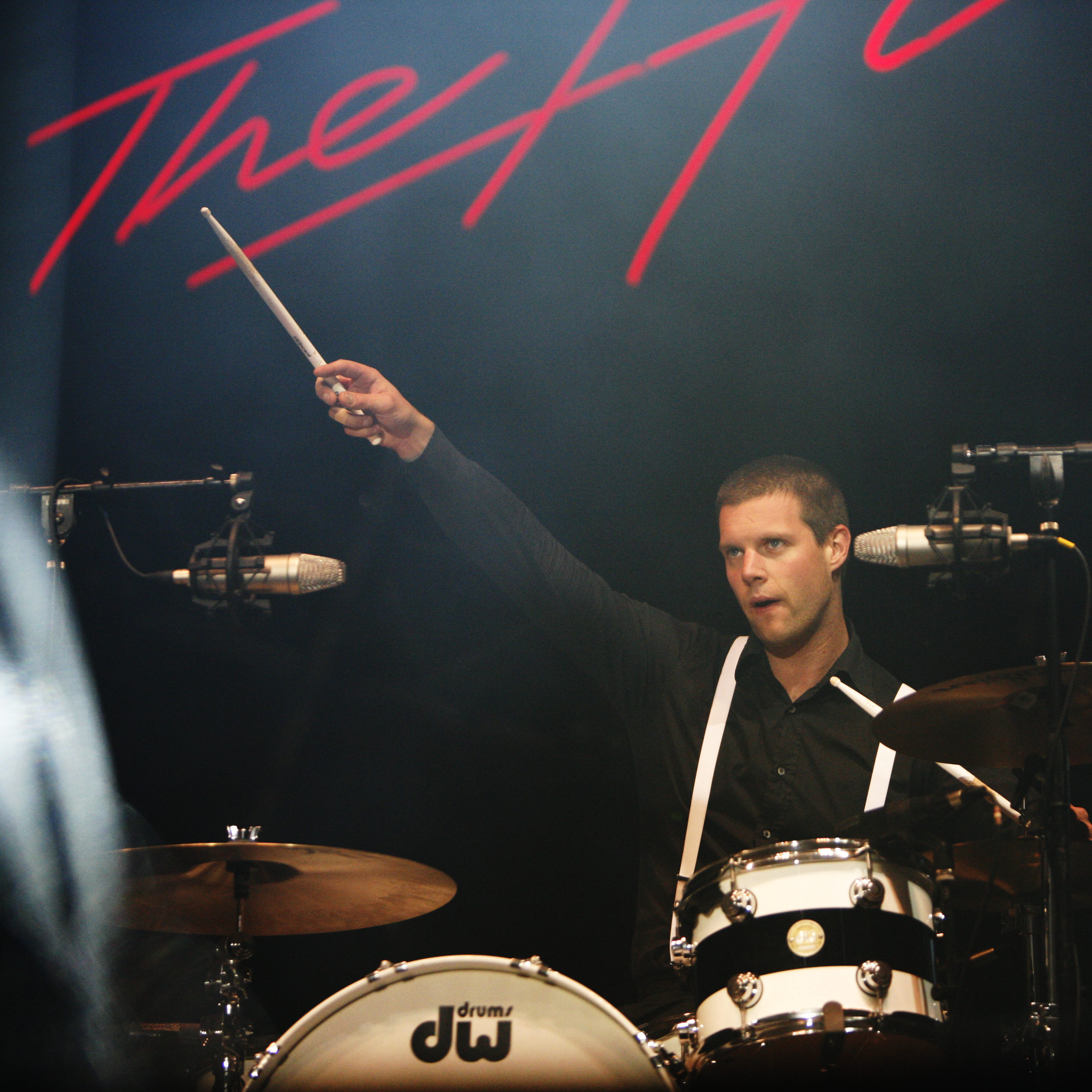
Grahn onstage with The Hives in 2007

Grahn is known for his high-speed drumming and accuracy when performing, switching beats easily in songs; "A Get Together to Tear it Apart" from Veni Vidi Vicious has an introduction by Grahn's drumming at a highly fast tempo. In The Hives' third album, Tyrannosaurus Hives, Grahn achieved a faster speed in his drumming, with rhythms and beats that are usually made by machines or synthesizers. The best example of this is the song "Two-Timing Touch and Broken Bones," where Grahn switches between his snare drum and mounted tom-tom with his left hand while playing eighth-notes on his hi-hat cymbals. Another example is the song "A Little More for Little You," in which Grahn plays almost three minutes of solid, unbroken sixteenth notes at a very fast tempo. Amongst other songs on the album, "Love In Plaster" has one of the fastest tempos thus creating a faster drum beat. Grahn's drumming on the song is unbroken, and many fans joke of Chris Dangerous' "bionic arm".

== Musical equipment ==
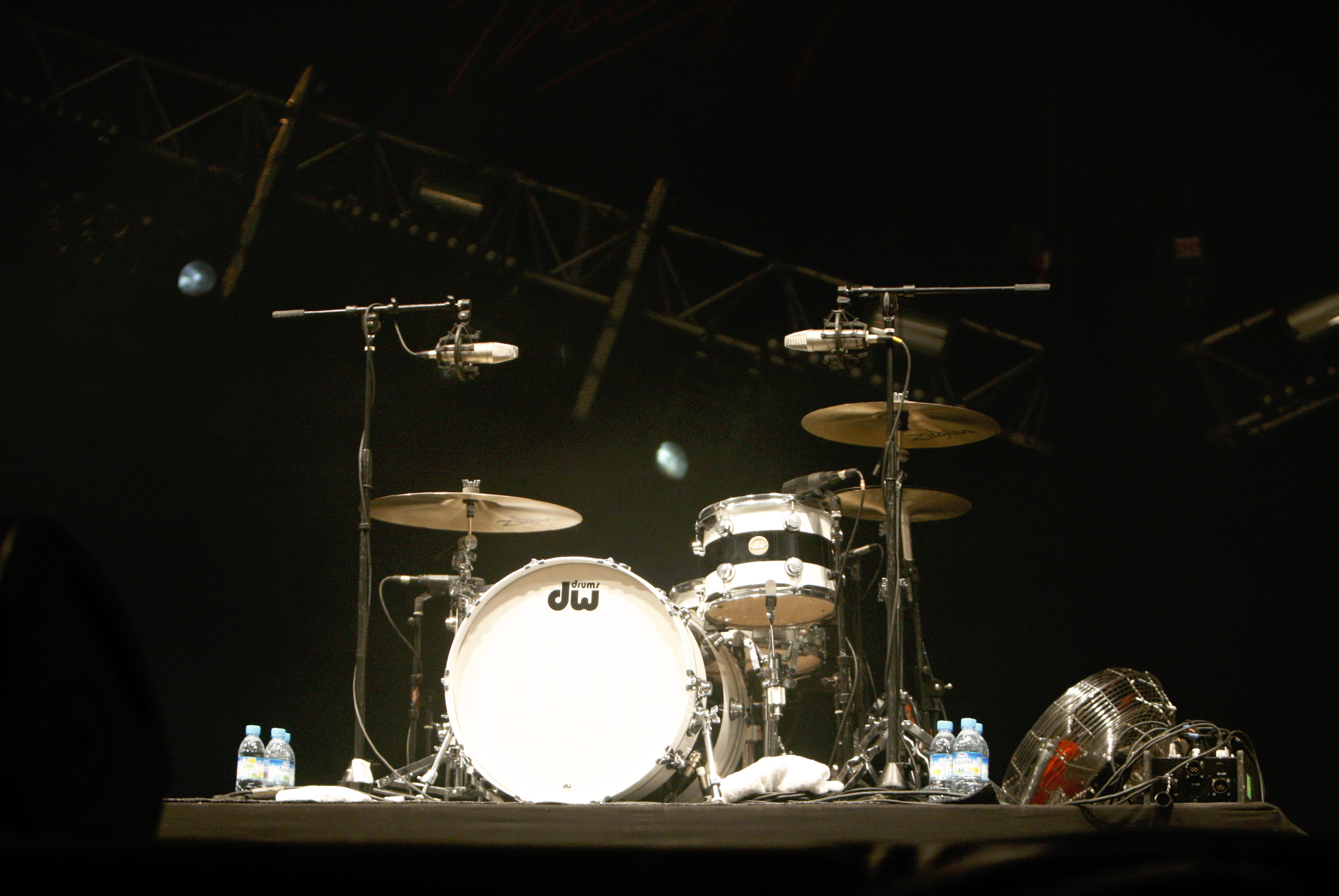
Chris Dangerous’ drum kit

Grahn uses a four-piece drum setup - one rack (mounted) tom, one floor tom, a snare drum and a bass drum. All of his drums, hardware, and pedals are DW brand. He has his own special kit by DW drums called the Chris Dangerous Custom Groove Hip Kit. This custom kit, however, is not featured on the DW website. Grahn also uses Zildjian cymbals, Mainly the A series. He uses an A series 21" Sweet Ride, an A 18" Thin Crash, and A Custom 14" Mastersound hi-hats.

Grahn sets up his drums to purposely make his kit look tiny - he lowers his cymbals, tom-toms, and snare drum, flattens the angle of his mounted tom (which is actually on a stand), and deliberately uses a smaller bass drum and floor tom to create the illusion of a very small kit. Arctic Monkeys drummer Matt Helders mimicked Dangerous' aesthetic style after watching him on television.

== Discography ==
- Barely Legal (1997)
- Veni Vidi Vicious (2000)
- Tyrannosaurus Hives (2004)
- The Black and White Album (2007)
- Lex Hives (2012)
- The Death of Randy Fitzsimmons (2023)
- The Hives Forever Forever The Hives (2025)
