= Niklas Almqvist =

Swedish rock guitarist

- Nicholaus Arson with The Hives at the Southside Festival in 2024

Background information
- Also known as: Randy Fitzsimmons
- Born: Säter, Dalarna, Sweden
- Genres: Alternative rock; garage punk; garage rock revival; post-punk revival
- Occupation: Guitarist
- Years active: 1989–present
- Member of: The Hives
- Website: thehives.com

Niklas Almqvist is a Swedish musician who is the lead guitarist of the garage rock band The Hives, of which his brother Howlin' Pelle is the lead singer.

== Career ==
Arson and his brother Per (Howlin' Pelle, lead singer) formed the band in 1993, and, according to a biography about the band, attracted the attention of promoter/manager/songwriter Randy Fitzsimmons (possibly a fictional character), who propelled the band to fame.

It was revealed in NME that Randy Fitzsimmons is a registered pseudonym belonging to Arson. This has led many to believe that Randy Fitzsimmons is in fact a myth, and that it is Arson who writes the songs. Arson and the rest of the band deny this and insist on the existence of Randy Fitzsimmons as the band's songwriter.

== Equipment ==
Nicholaus uses almost exclusively Fender Telecaster, Esquire or Telecaster Deluxe style guitars (though he is seen playing a Danelectro in the Hate to Say I Told You So video). He also plays "The Arsonette" a custom built guitar by Sundberg Guitars, with tone chambers and a Firebird style midsection to give it a short, dead tone with little to no sustain. His guitars often reflect the outfits of the band with different combos of black and white finishes and pickguards. Along with Vigilante Carlstroem and Dr. Matt Destruction, Arson uses white Hiwatt amplifiers.

Although he does not rely on effects, he uses an Electro-Harmonix Micro POG, a Boss AW-3 auto wah, a Boss DD-3 digital delay and a Prunes & Custard Harmonic Generator-Intermodulator for certain songs or sounds.

== Discography ==
- Barely Legal (1997)
- Veni Vidi Vicious (2000)
- Tyrannosaurus Hives (2004)
- The Black and White Album (2007)
- Lex Hives (2012)
- The Death of Randy Fitzsimmons (2023)
- The Hives Forever Forever The Hives (2025)
