= Mattias Bernwall =

Swedish bassist

Dr. Matt Destruction
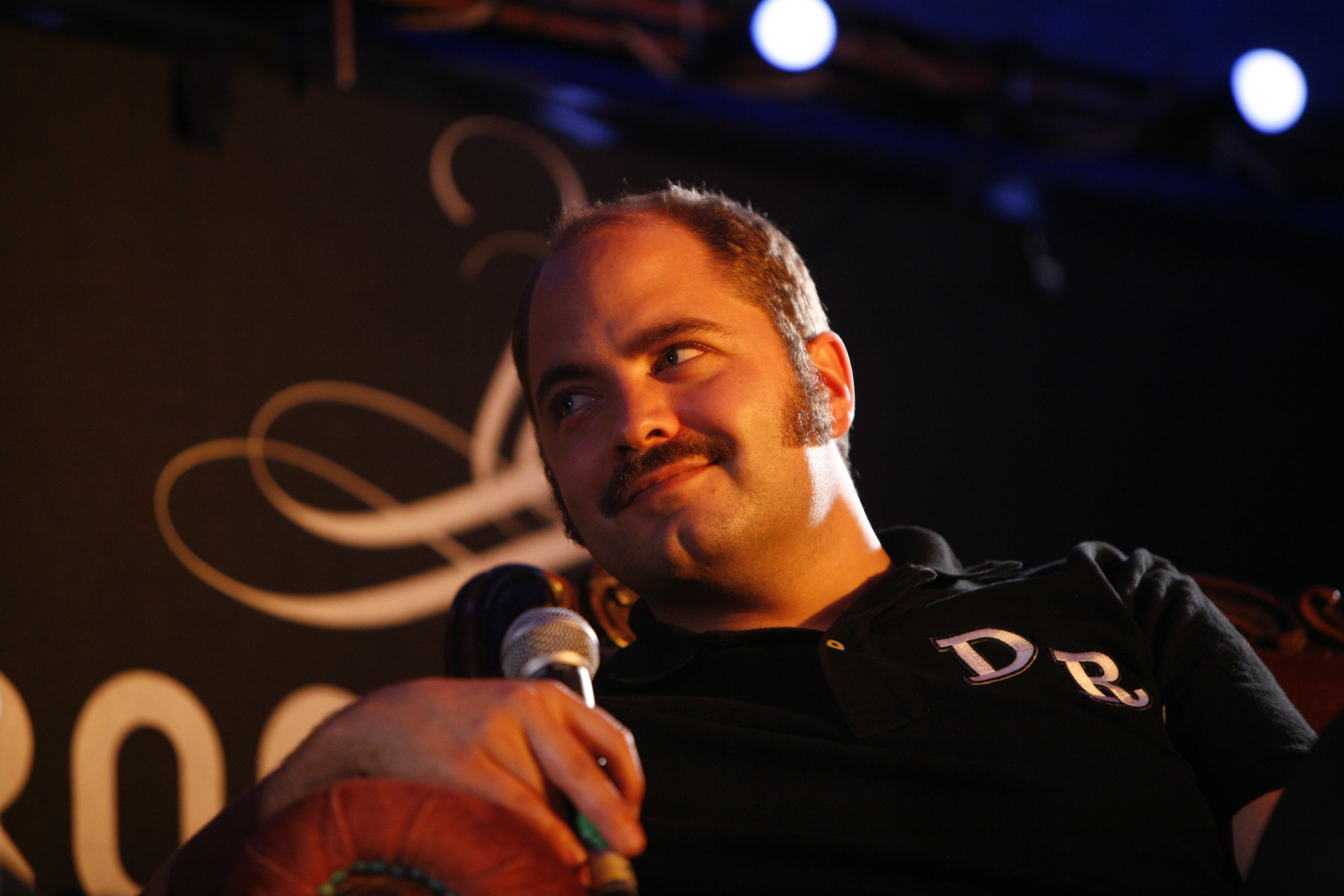
- Dr. Matt Destruction in 2007

Background information
- Born: Mattias Bernvall; 18 March 1978 (age 48); Fagersta, Västmanland, Sweden
- Genres: Alternative rock; garage punk; garage rock
- Occupation: Musician
- Instrument: Bass guitar
- Years active: 1989–2013
- Formerly of: The Hives
- Website: thehives.com

Mattias Bernwall (born 18 March 1978), better known by his stage name Dr. Matt Destruction, is a Swedish musician who is the former bassist for garage rock band The Hives.

== Career ==
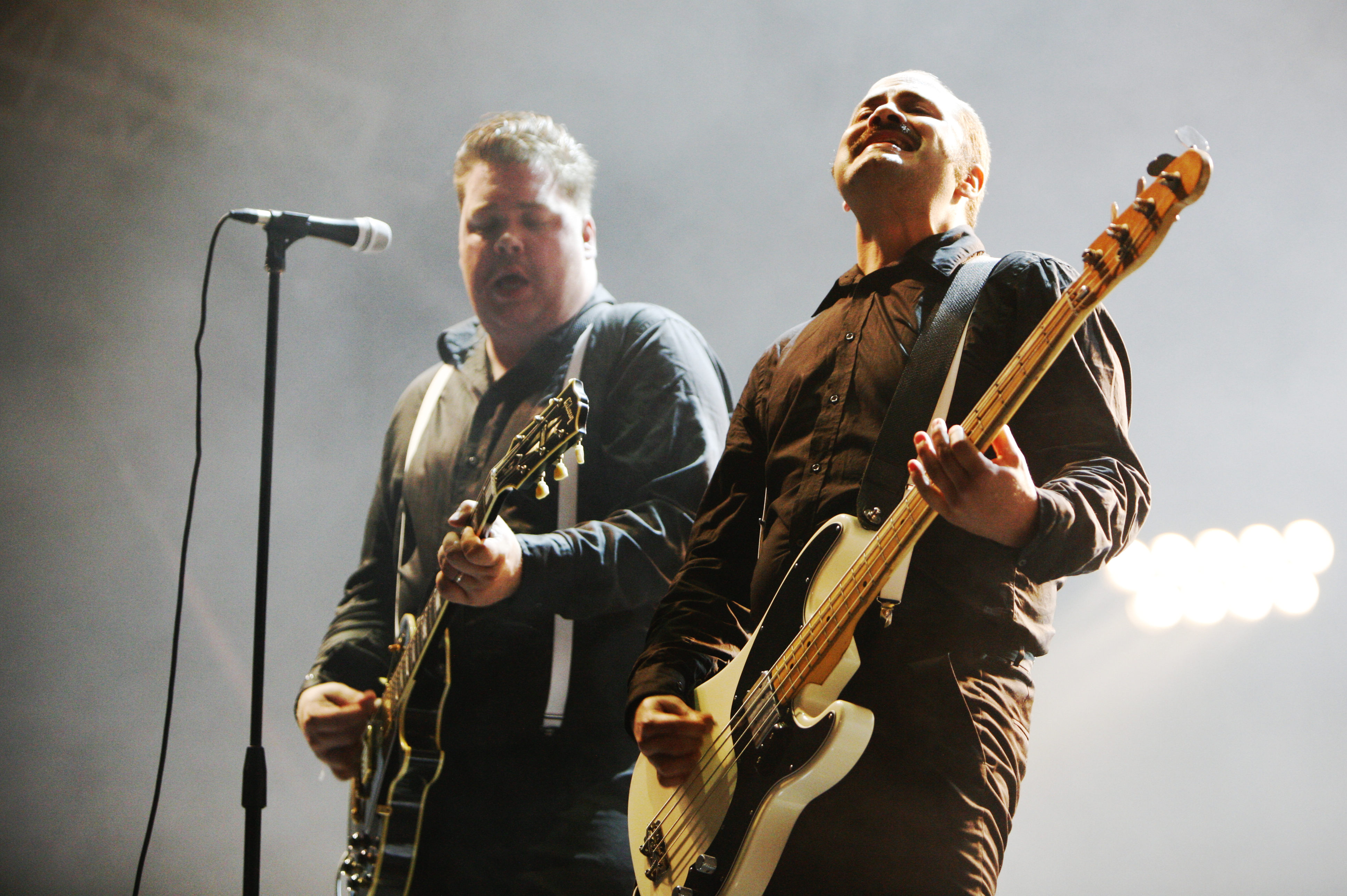
Dr. Matt Destruction (right) playing bass onstage beside bandmate Vigilante Carlstroem in 2007

Bernwall was born in Fagersta and began playing bass in bands while still in mellanstadiet (compulsory schooling in Sweden). The Hives were formed in 1993, when he was 15 years old, and rose to prominence in the early 2000s as a leading group of the post-punk revival, playing garage rock.

Bernwall typically played a 1970s Fender Telecaster Bass which differs from the late-1960s Telecaster and 1950s Precision bass (each inspiring another) in that it has a humbucker rather than a single coil pickup. His bass was in the band's signature white/black color combo along with a white Hiwatt amplifier; he almost always used bass distortion and a pick. He also occasionally played a Rickenbacker bass, as seen in the "Hate to Say I Told You So" music video.

Bernwall departed the Hives in 2013, for undisclosed health issues. He made a cameo appearance in the band's 2023 music video for the single "Countdown to Shutdown".

== Discography ==
- Barely Legal (1997)
- Veni Vidi Vicious (2000)
- Tyrannosaurus Hives (2004)
- The Black and White Album (2007)
- Lex Hives (2012)
