= Hate to Say I Told You So =

2000 single by the Hives

Single by the Hives

from the album Veni Vidi Vicious
- Released: 20 November 2000
- Recorded: 1999
- Genre: Garage punk
- Length: 3:22
- Label: Burning Heart
- Songwriter: Randy Fitzsimmons
- Producer: Pelle Gunderfelt

The Hives singles chronology
"Hate to Say I Told You So" (2000)	"Main Offender" (2001)

Music video
- "Hate to Say I Told You So" on YouTube

"Hate to Say I Told You So" is the first single from Swedish rock band the Hives' second studio album, Veni Vidi Vicious. It was released as a single in Sweden on 20 November 2000 and was later released in several countries in 2002. It is considered by many as the Hives' signature song.

It was nominated for the Kerrang! Award for Best Single in 2002. In March 2005, Q placed it at number 54 in its list of the 100 Greatest Guitar Tracks. It also lists at 244 on Pitchfork's's Top 500 songs of the 2000s (decade). In October 2011, NME placed it at number 84 on its list "150 Best Tracks of the Past 15 Years".

== Track listings ==
Swedish CD single and US 7-inch single

1. "Hate to Say I Told You So"
2. "Die, All Right!"

European CD single (CD1)

1. "Hate to Say I Told You So"
2. "Fever"
3. "Barely Homosapien"

European CD single (CD2)

1. "Hate to Say I Told You So"
2. "Uptempo Venomous Poison"
3. "Gninrom Ytic Kcorknup"

US and Australian CD single

1. "Hate to Say I Told You So" – 3:22
2. "Die, All Right!" – 2:48
3. "The Hives Are Law, You Are Crime" – 2:29

== Charts ==
=== Weekly charts ===
Chart (2001–2002)	Peak position
Australia (ARIA)	36
Ireland (IRMA)	49
Netherlands (Single Top 100)	85
Scotland Singles (OCC)	22
UK Singles (OCC)	23
UK Indie (OCC)	4
US Billboard Hot 100	86
US Alternative Airplay (Billboard)	6
US Mainstream Rock (Billboard)	35

=== Year-end charts ===
Chart (2002)	Position
US Modern Rock Tracks (Billboard)	24

== Certifications ==
Region	Certification	Certified units/sales
United Kingdom (BPI)	Platinum	600,000^{‡}
^{‡} Sales+streaming figures based on certification alone.

== Release history ==
Region	Date	Format(s)	Label(s)	Ref.
Sweden	20 November 2000	CD	Burning Heart	
United Kingdom	4 December 2000	CD	Heartcore	
United Kingdom	11 February 2002	7-inch vinyl; CD	Poptones	
United States	11 February 2002	7-inch vinyl; CD	Gearhead	
United States	1 April 2002	Alternative radio	Burning Heart; Epitaph	
Australia	8 April 2002	CD	Burning Heart	
United States	10 June 2002	Mainstream rock; active rock radio	Burning Heart; Epitaph; Sire; Reprise	
