= Fagersta =

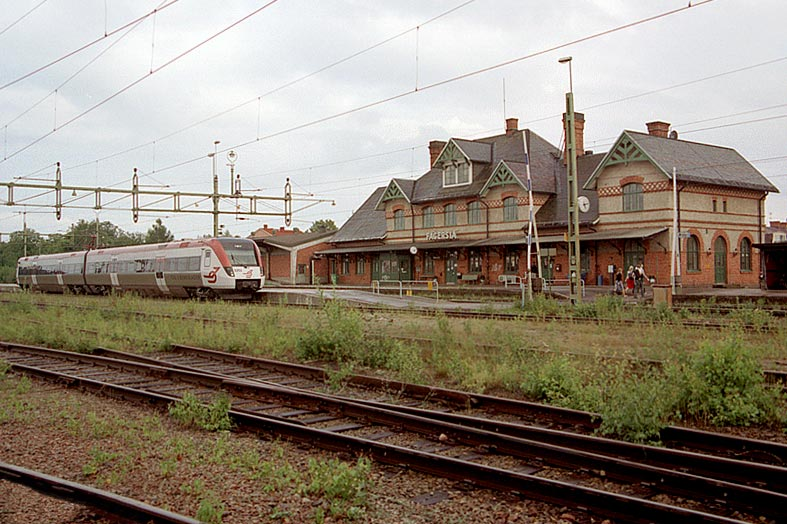
- Fagersta railway station

- Location within Västmanland Location within Sweden
- Coordinates: 60°00′15″N 15°47′36″E
- Country: Sweden
- Province: Västmanland
- County: Västmanland County
- Municipality: Fagersta Municipality
- Founded: 1944

Area
  - Total: 9.47 km^{2} (3.66 sq mi)
- Elevation: 102 m (335 ft)

Population (31 December 2010)
  - Total: 11,130
  - Density: 1,175/km^{2} (3,040/sq mi)
- Time zone: UTC+1 (CET)
  - Summer (DST): UTC+2 (CEST)
- Postal code: 737 xx
- Area code: (+46) 223
- Website: Official website

Fagersta is a locality and the seat of Fagersta Municipality in Västmanland County, Sweden, with 11,130 inhabitants in 2010.

== Geography ==
The city is located at the junction of two railways between Ludvika-Västerås and Avesta (Krylbo)-Örebro, in the heart of the historic Bergslagen region which is rich in copper and iron ore. The 60th parallel north passes through the town.

== History ==
There has been mining activity in the Fagersta area since the 15th century but it was not organized until the 17th century and was not made a corporation until 1873, when Fagersta Bruks AB was founded.

Fagersta was made a city in 1944 when the industrial hotspot of Fagersta merged with its service-oriented neighbour Västanfors. It is now the seat of Fagersta Municipality. The Fagersta airspace surveillance tower is a Second World War-era observation platform constructed to protect a nearby steel mill.

== Industry ==
Today's industry is focused on hard metal tools (Seco Tools AB and Atlas Copco Secoroc AB) and stainless steel products (Fagersta Stainless AB and Outokumpu Stainless Tubular Products AB).

== Notable natives ==
- Ulf Samuelsson, ice hockey player (NHL)
- Tomas Sandström, ice hockey player (NHL)
- The Hives, garage rock band
- 59 Times the Pain, garage rock band
- Johan August Brinell, metallurgist and inventor of the Brinell hardness test at the Fagersta Iron and Steel Works in 1900
- Kjell Ramstedt, drummer for punk rock band No Fun at All

== Gallery ==
Mid-20th-century open-end wrench by the former Swedish steel and engineering group Fagersta Bruks AB
