= Mikael Karlsson Åström =

Swedish guitarist

Vigilante Carlstroem
- Vigilante Carlstroem in 2007

Background information
- Also known as: Pig Champion Jr.
- Born: Mikael Karlsson Åström; Fagersta, Västmanland, Sweden
- Genres: Alternative rock, garage punk, garage rock revival
- Occupation: Guitarist
- Years active: 1989–present
- Member of: The Hives
- Website: thehives.com

Mikael Karlsson Åström, better known by his stage name Vigilante Carlstroem, is a Swedish musician who is the rhythm guitarist of the garage rock band The Hives.

== Biography ==
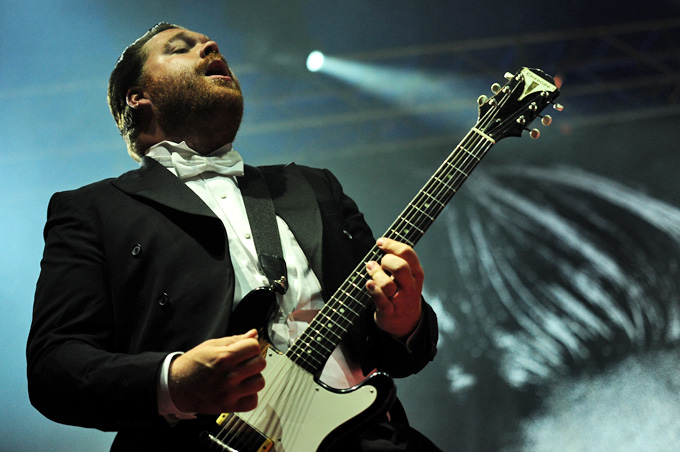
Carlstroem onstage in 2011

Vigilante started playing guitar at the age of ten and was influenced by bands such as Sex Pistols, Dead Kennedys and local Swedish punk bands. Vigilante usually plays Epiphone Coronet guitars and uses Divided by 13 and Fender amplifiers.

Vigilante helped to form The Hives in 1993. An early stage name of his, Barely Legal, was used as the title of their debut LP in 1997. He has been a member of said band ever since.

Vigilante has contributed to the album Ge Fan I Våra Vatten (Don't fucking touch our waters), which is a record made by Swedish musicians as a means to raise funds for the protection of fish in Swedish waters.

== Discography ==
=== The Hives ===
- Barely Legal (1997)
- Veni Vidi Vicious (2000)
- Tyrannosaurus Hives (2004)
- The Black and White Album (2007)
- Lex Hives (2012)
- The Death of Randy Fitzsimmons (2023)
- The Hives Forever Forever The Hives (2025)

=== The Dragtones ===
- Drag (2012)
