= Pelle Almqvist =

Swedish singer (born 1978)

- Almqvist performing in 2018

Background information
- Also known as: Howlin' Pelle Almqvist
- Born: Per Almqvist; 29 May 1978 (age 48); Fagersta, Västmanland, Sweden
- Genres: Garage rock; garage punk
- Occupation: Singer
- Years active: 1993–present
- Member of: The Hives

Per "Pelle" Almqvist (born 29 May 1978), also known as Howlin' Pelle Almqvist, is a Swedish singer who is the frontman of the garage rock band The Hives.

== Biography ==
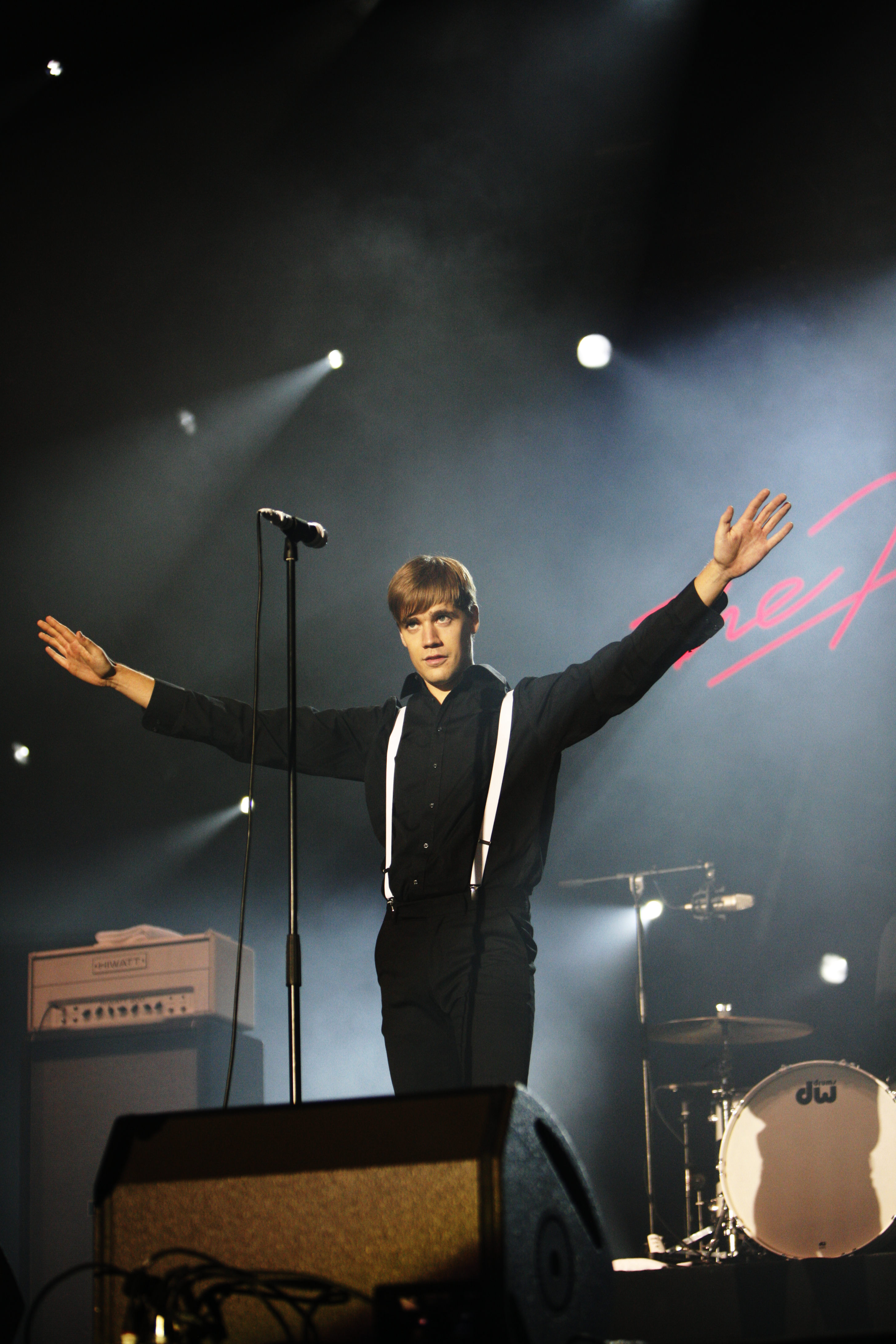
Almqvist on stage at Eurockéennes 2007

Almqvist was born to a doctor father and a teacher mother. Almqvist and his brother Niklas, known as Nicholaus Arson, formed the band in 1993, and, according to a fictional biography about the band, attracted the attention of promoter/manager/songwriter Randy Fitzsimmons. Prior to success with the Hives he worked as a postman and a sixth-grade teacher.

Almqvist is known for being particularly animated during live shows, and his onstage antics have earned the band the title of "The best live band in the world" from Spin Magazine, who also put Almqvist in their list of the "50 Greatest Frontmen of All Time". Some of his onstage antics include regularly mixing with the crowd, climbing on amps and other equipment, and banter between songs that is often nonsensical and seemingly arrogant.

Almqvist was previously in a relationship with Maria Andersson, lead vocalist of the Swedish rock band Sahara Hotnights, until a 2006 breakup. Since May 2010, he was in a relationship with Catrin Nilsson. As of 2023, he is in a relationship with Swedish actress Ana Gil de Melo Nascimento.

In January 2007, Almqvist led the awards show for the radio station P3 Guld.

In 2016, he presented Musikhjälpen which was broadcast from Örebro.

Almqvist is an atheist.

His stage name is a homage to blues singer Howlin' Wolf.

In 2021, he took part in the sixth season of the Swedish game show Alla mot alla med Filip och Fredrik with teammate Little Jinder.

== Collaborations ==
Almqvist collaborated with Swedish rock artist Moneybrother on a cover of the Operation Ivy song "Freeze Up". They used Swedish lyrics and called it "Jag skriver inte på nåt", which translates as "I Won't Sign Anything". He was also featured on the single "Dance to our Disco" by the DJ duo Punks Jump Up.

== Discography ==
- Barely Legal (1997)
- Veni Vidi Vicious (2000)
- Tyrannosaurus Hives (2004)
- The Black and White Album (2007)
- Lex Hives (2012)
- The Death of Randy Fitzsimmons (2023)
- The Hives Forever Forever The Hives (2025)
