= Grammis =

Swedish music award

- Awarded for: Recognize and reward artists, musicians and creative people who have achieved interesting works in various fields of music during the year
- Date: 1969–1972; 1987–present
- Country: Sweden
- Presented by: IFPI Sverige
- First award: 25 September 1969
- Website: grammis.se

The Grammis (sometimes referred to as the Swedish Grammy Awards) are music awards presented annually to musicians and songwriters in Sweden. The oldest Swedish music awards were instituted as a local equivalent of the Grammy Awards given in the United States. The awards ceremony is generally held each year in February in Stockholm. The awards were established in 1969 and awarded until 1972 when they were canceled, then revived in 1987.

There are around 20 different award-categories, which have changed over the years. Swedish artists and foreign artists who live in Sweden are eligible, as are artists in other countries if their music is produced in Sweden and targets a Swedish audience.

The awards are presented by IFPI Sverige, along with the newspaper Expressen. The awards recognize achievements in Sweden's music industry across the different award categories.

== History ==
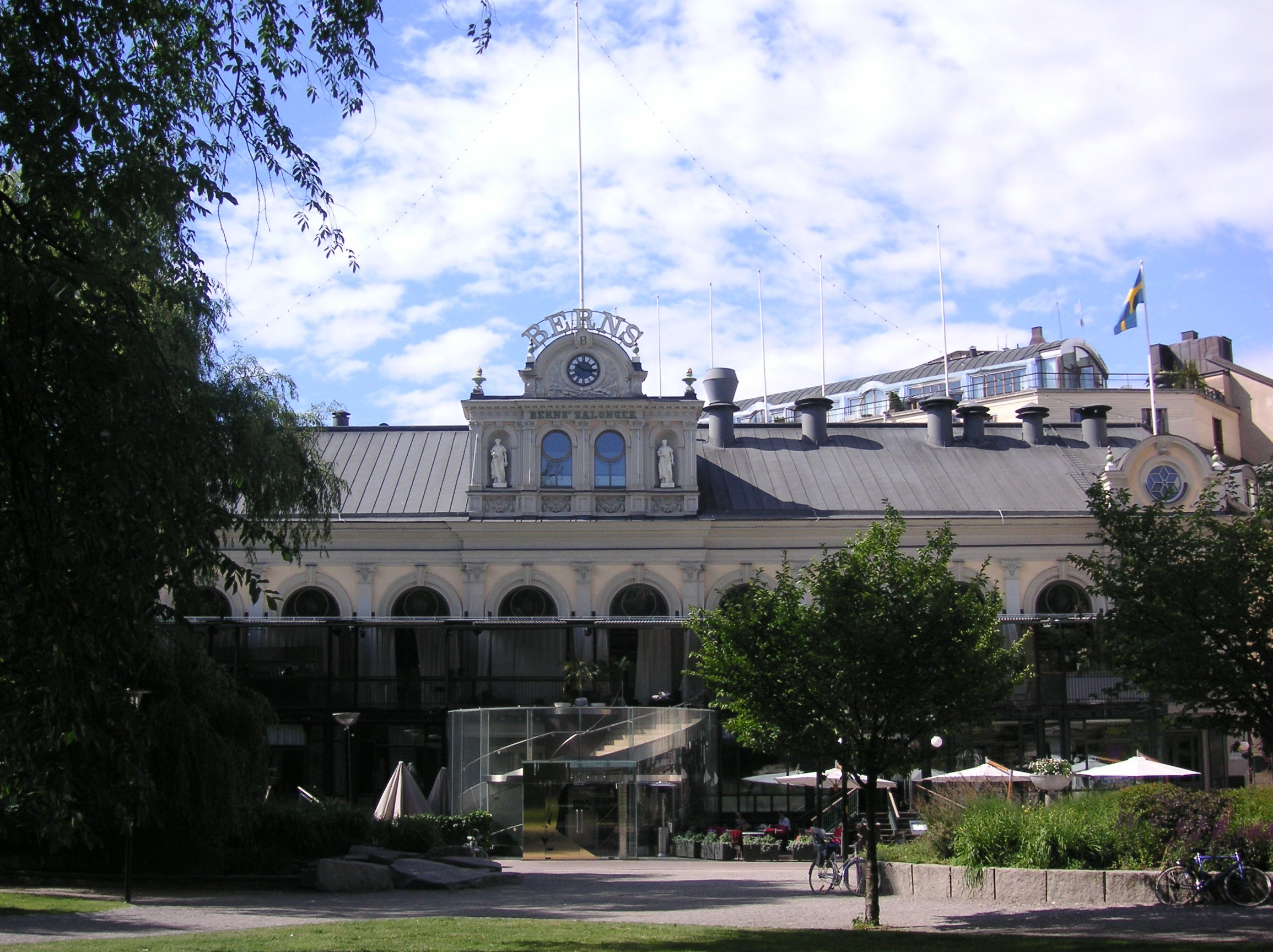
Berns salonger, venue for the first Grammis ceremony in 1969

The first Grammis were presented on 25 September 1969 at Berns salonger in Stockholm. They were presented annually until 1972, after which they were discontinued. This was attributed the influence of music critics on the awards, especially after the win of unidentified group Philemon Arthur and the Dung at the 1972 ceremony. The Grammis were reinstated in 1987, fifteen years later.

During an acceptance speech at the 1993 ceremony, Popsicle guitarist Fredrik Norberg wished that the members of Arvingarna would die in a bus accident. This incident caused a scandal in Sweden and the band's next record was cancelled. Following the 2011 ceremony, the separate categories of Best Female Artist and Best Male Artist were abolished and one Best Artist award was instead awarded.

Following the 2019 ceremony, the award for Children's Music of the Year was cut, with the IFPI citing low submissions to the category and the challenge of having an adult jury decide on an award for children. The decision received criticism and was reinstated for the 2021 ceremony. The 2021 ceremony was postponed from its usual February date to June due to the COVID-19 pandemic in Sweden.

== Ceremonies ==
Since the 1988 ceremony, the Grammis have been held at the beginning of the year to recognize music from the preceding year. With the exception of the 1970 ceremony held in Lidingö, every ceremony has taken place at venues in Stockholm.

No.	Date	Venue	Presenter(s)	Broadcaster
1	25 September 1969	Berns salonger	Unknown	Unknown
2	10 September 1970	Hotell Foresta, Lidingö	Unknown	Unknown
3	20 September 1971	Berns salonger	Lasse Holmqvist	Unknown
4	11 September 1972	Folkets hus	Unknown	Unknown
5	13 February 1988	Grand Hôtel	Jacob Dahlin	Unknown
6	9 April 1989	Berns salonger	Niklas Levy and Ingvar Storm	Unknown
7	25 March 1990	Berns salonger	Niklas Levy and Ingvar Storm	Unknown
8	16 February 1991	Berns salonger	Niklas Levy and Ingvar Storm	Unknown
9	8 February 1992	Berns salonger	Niklas Levy and Ingvar Storm	Unknown
10	27 February 1993	Berns salonger	Niklas Levy and Ingvar Storm	Unknown
11	19 February 1994	Berns salonger	Unknown	Unknown
12	17 February 1995	Berns salonger	Martin Timell	Unknown
13	19 February 1996	Chinateatern	Unknown	Unknown
14	17 February 1997	Cirkus	Lasse Anrell	SVT
15	16 February 1998	Kungliga tennishallen	Sofia Wistam	TV4
16	15 February 1999	Kungliga tennishallen	Sofia Wistam	TV4
17	14 February 2000	Kungliga tennishallen	Sofia Wistam	TV4
18	19 February 2001	Annexet	Magnus Uggla	TV4
19	14 February 2002	Stockholm Globe Arena	Henrik Schyffert	TV4
20	18 February 2003	Berns salonger	Mankie Eriksson	Not broadcast
21	9 February 2004	Berns salonger	Lars Beckung	TV4
22	7 February 2005	Grand Hôtel	Wille Crafoord	TV4
23	7 February 2006	Tyrol	Ulf Elfving	TV4
23	7 February 2006	Cirkus	Ulrika Eriksson and Eagle-Eye Cherry	TV4
24	30 January 2007	Hovet	Carina Berg and Sanna Bråding	TV4
25	9 January 2008	Stockholm Globe Arena	Adam Alsing and Gry Forssell	TV4
26	7 January 2009	Hovet	Adam Alsing and Gry Forssell	TV4
27	15 January 2010	Münchenbryggeriet	Karin Winther	Not broadcast
28	17 January 2011	Royal Swedish Opera	Eva Dahlgren	Not broadcast
29	14 February 2012	Royal Swedish Opera	Ola Salo	SVT1
30	20 February 2013	Cirkus	Kalle Moraeus and Timo Räisänen	SVT1
31	19 February 2014	Cirkus	Gina Dirawi and Ray Cokes	SVT1 and SVT Play
32	25 February 2015	Cirkus	Gina Dirawi	SVT1
33	24 February 2016	Cirkus	Petter	SVT1
34	28 February 2017	Stockholm Concert Hall	Magnus Carlson and Maxida Märak	Kanal 5
35	8 February 2018	Grand Hôtel	Emma Molin and Amanda Ooms	Not broadcast
36	7 February 2019	Annexet	Rennie Mirro and Daniel Hallberg	TV4 Play
37	6 February 2020	Annexet	Rennie Mirro and Amie Bramme Sey	TV12 and TV4 Play
38	3 June 2021	Södra Teatern	Amie Bramme Sey and Johanna Nordström	TV4 Play and Sjuan
39	19 May 2022	Annexet	Amie Bramme Sey and Sofia Dalén	TV4 Play, C More, Sjuan
40	3 May 2023	Annexet	Pelle Almqvist and Amie Bramme Sey	TV4 Play
41	8 May 2024	Annexet	Marie Agerhäll and Jesper Rönndahl	YouTube
42	27 March 2025	Annexet	Assia Dahir and Alexander Karim	YouTube
43	29 April 2026	Annexet	Niklas Strömstedt	YouTube

== Categories awarded ==
As of the 2021 ceremony, there are 21 categories, not including special awards:

- Album of the Year
- Alternative Pop of the Year
- Artist of the Year
- Children's Music of the Year
- Dansband of the Year
- Electro/Dance of the Year
- Folk Music of the Year
- Hip Hop of the Year
- Hard Rock/Metal of the Year
- Jazz of the Year
- Classical of the Year
- Song of the Year
- Music Video of the Year
- Newcomer of the Year
- Pop of the Year
- Producer of the Year
- Rock of the Year
- Soul/R&B of the Year
- Songwriter of the Year
- Lyricist of the Year
- Visa/Singer-Songwriter of the Year

Special awards include:

- Honorary Award of the Year
- Special Award of the Year

Grammis were previously awarded in the following categories:

- Best Electronic Producer
- Chamber Music Production of the Year
- Choir Production of the Year
- Documentary Production of the Year
- Group of the Year
- Innovator of the Year
- Instrumental of the Year
- International Album of the Year
- Live Act of the Year
- LP of the Year
- Music DVD of the Year
- Musical and Cabaret Recording of the Year
- Open Category
- Pop/Rock Female of the Year
- Pop/Rock Male of the Year
- Pop/Rock Group of the Year
- Religious of the Year
- Stage, Film, Radio and TV Production of the Year
- Swedish International Success of the Year
- Symphonic Production of the Year

== Trophy ==
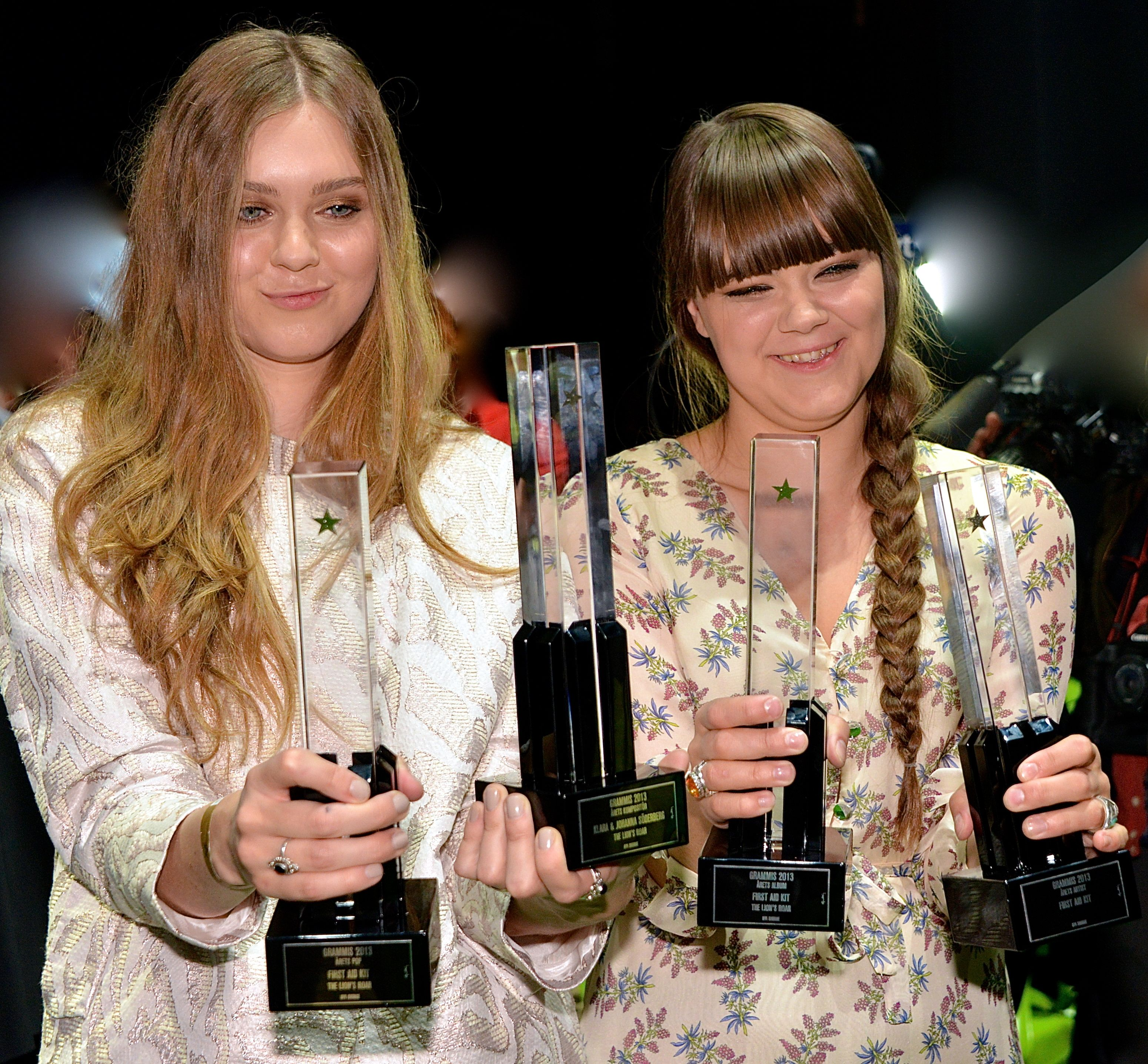
First Aid Kit with their Grammis trophies at the 2013 ceremony

The original Grammis trophy was a plaquette of stained pine and silver, designed by Claës Giertta and made to be hung on a wall. The trophy was redesigned in 2007 by Efva Attling and made by Orrefors. It weighs 2.2 kg (4.9 lb), made of glass with a platinum star, and was designed so that it could be lifted with one hand. Attling described her inspiration as "the Empire State Building meets the Hötorget buildings".

== List of winners ==
=== Album of the Year ===
Album of the Year (Årets album) has been awarded since 1993.

- 1993: Himlen runt hörnet – Lisa Nilsson
- 1994: Flow – Fleshquartet
- 1995: Lisa Ekdahl – Lisa Ekdahl
- 1996: Plast – Just D
- 1997: Kristina från Duvemåla (cast recording) – Helen Sjöholm, Peter Jöback, Anders Ekborg, and others
- 1998: Isola – Kent
- 1999: Gran Turismo – The Cardigans
- 2000: Quel bordel – Christian Falk
- 2001: Rock 'n' Roll Highschool – Teddybears STHLM
- 2002: A Camp – A Camp
- 2003: Vapen & ammunition – Kent
- 2004: Long Gone Before Daylight – The Cardigans
- 2005: Tyrannosaurus Hives – The Hives
- 2006: Robyn – Robyn
- 2007: Silent Shout – The Knife
- 2008: Tillbaka till samtiden – Kent
- 2009: Leaving on a Mayday – Anna Ternheim
- 2010: Kärlek är för dom – Thåström
- 2011: Body Talk – Robyn
- 2012: Wounded Rhymes – Lykke Li
- 2013: The Lion's Roar – First Aid Kit
- 2014: Demand the Impossible! – Jenny Wilson
- 2015: Stay Gold – First Aid Kit
- 2016: Sky City – Amason
- 2017: Då som nu för alltid – Kent
- 2018: So Good – Zara Larsson
- 2019: I'm a Dream – Seinabo Sey
- 2020: Det bästa kanske inte hänt än – Molly Sandén
- 2021: Fånga mig när jag faller – Victor Leksell
- 2022: PS jag hatar dig – Miriam Bryant
- 2023: Dirt Femme – Tove Lo
- 2024: Oas – Dina Ögon
- 2025: Pink Velvet Theatre - Benjamin Ingrosso
- 2026: Viagr Aboys - Viagra Boys

=== Artist of the Year ===
Artist of the Year (Årets artist) has been awarded since 1988 for a significant contribution such as an album, concert tour, or other musical achievement. For the 2008–2011 ceremonies, there were separate awards for Female Artist of the Year (Årets kvinnliga artist) and Male Artist of the Year (Årets manliga artist).

- 1988: Galenskaparna och After Shave
- 1989: Di Leva
- 1990: The Creeps
- 1991: Robert Broberg
- 1992: Eva Dahlgren
- 1993: Marie Fredriksson
- 1994: Ulf Lundell
- 1995: Lisa Ekdahl
- 1996: Eva Dahlgren
- 1997: Gyllene Tider
- 1998: Eric Gadd
- 1999: Bo Kaspers orkester
- 2000: Thåström
- 2001: The Ark
- 2002: The Soundtrack of Our Lives
- 2003: Kent (for Vapen & ammunition)
- 2004: Per Gessle (for Mazarin)
- 2005: The Hives (for Tyrannosaurus Hives)
- 2006: Laleh
- 2007: The Knife
- 2008
  - Female: Säkert! (for Säkert!)
  - Male: Salem Al Fakir (for This Is Who I Am)
- 2009
  - Female: Anna Ternheim (for Leaving on a Mayday)
  - Male: Håkan Hellström (for För sent för Edelweiss)
- 2010
  - Female: Amanda Jenssen (for Happyland)
  - Male: Lars Winnerbäck (for Tänk om jag ångrar mig och sen ångrar mig igen)
- 2011
  - Female: Robyn (for Body Talk)
  - Male: Håkan Hellström (for 2 steg från paradise)
- 2012: Lykke Li (for Wounded Rhymes)
- 2013: First Aid Kit
- 2014: Avicii
- 2015: Tove Lo
- 2016: Silvana Imam
- 2017: Zara Larsson
- 2018: Zara Larsson
- 2019: Z.E
- 2020: Molly Sandén
- 2021: Victor Leksell
- 2022: Benjamin Ingrosso
- 2023: Tove Lo
- 2024: Thomas Stenström
- 2025: Benjamin Ingrosso
- 2026: Zara Larsson

=== Children's Album of the Year ===
An award for children's music has been presented since the start of the Grammis and has undergone numerous name changes over the years, the latest being Children's Album of the Year (Årets barnalbum) as of the 2002 ceremony. It was not presented at the 2020 ceremony.

- 1969: Djungelboken
- 1970: Goda' goda' – Jojje Wadenius and Barbro Lindgren
- 1971: The Pling & Plong Show – Robert Karl Oskar Broberg
- 1972: Här kommer Ville och Valle och Viktor – Jörgen Lantz, Anders Linder and Hans Wigren
- 1988: Peter Pan – Nationalteatern
- 1989: Hokus pokus, Alfons Åberg!
- 1990: Resan till Melonia – Various artists
- 1991: Häjkån, mera bäjkån! – Tomas Forssell
- 1992: Lilla ungen min – Barbro Lindgren and Georg Riedel
- 1993: Majas alfabetssånger – Lena Anderson, Kerstin Andeby and Peter Wanngren
- 1994: Aladdin
- 1995: Oj oj oj! – 18 barnlåtar – Mikloz and Hygglona
- 1996: Pettsonsånger – Bröderna Slut
- 1997: Ronny Rooster & hans vänner
- 1998: Lasses & Morgans sopresa – Lasse and Morgan
- 1999: Electric Banana Tajm – Electric Banana Band
- 2000: Zzoppa – Jojje Wadenius
- 2001: En randig skiva – Doris & Knäckebröderna me' Peps
- 2002: Vi är Cowboybengts – Cowboybengts
- 2003: Gorillan – Ola & Gorillan
- 2004: Trollringen – Lennart Hellsing and Georg Riedel
- 2005: Mycket känsliga bitar – Anders & Lars In de Betou
- 2006: Lilla Kotten sjunger julvisor – Helen Sjöholm, Dogge and others
- 2007: Hajar du – James Hollingworth and Jojje Wadenius
- 2008: Älskade ramsor, sagor & sånger från Barnkammarboken – Various artists
- 2009: Swingtajm! Trazan & Banarnes 30-årsskiva! – Trazan & Banarne
- 2010: Meningen med livet – Bröderna Lindgren
- 2011: Stava med skägg – Orkesterpop
- 2012: Det kostar på att vara barn – Oscar Danielson
- 2013: I tiden – Bröderna Lindgren
- 2014: Jazzoo – Oddjob
- 2015: Trollkarlen från Oz – Glada Hudik-teatern, Salem Al Fakir and Pontus de Wolfe
- 2016: What If... – Nina Persson
- 2017: Emma Nordenstams bästa barnlåtar – Emma Nordenstam
- 2018: Hasses trädgård – Hasse Andersson
- 2019: Mina egna favoriter – Gullan Bornemark
- 2021: Folk – Dikt och toner om personer – Britta Persson

=== Classical of the Year ===
Awards for classical music have been presented since the inaugural ceremony (with a gap in the 1990s), then referring to "serious music" (seriös musik). Classical of the Year (Årets klassiska) can be awarded to an ensemble or a soloist; it has previously been presented as two separate categories.

- 1969:
  - Pre-1960: Sven-Erik Bäck – Tranfjädrarna
  - Post-1960: Bengt Hambraeus – Fresque Sonore / Transfiguration
  - Soloist: Margot Rödin – Tre sånger
- 1970:
  - Pre-1960: Hans Leygraf and Saulesco-kvartetten – Mozarts pianokvartett Ess-dur och Ludvig Normans stråkkvartett A-moll
  - Post-1960: Stockholm Philharmonic Orchestra conducted by Antal Doráti – Allan Pettersson Symphony No. 7
  - Soloist: Staffan Scheja – Staffan Scheja spelar svensk pianomusik
- 1971:
  - Newer music: Stockholm Philarmonic Wind Quintet – Musik av Ligeti/Danzi/Villa-Lobos
  - Older music: Musica Holmiae – Barock på parnassen
  - Soloist: Janos Solyom – Musik av Stenhammar/Liszt
- 1972:
  - Chamber music: Mircea Saulesco and others – Saulescokvartetten
  - Choir: Eric Ericson – Europäische Chormusik
  - Symphony: Swedish Radio Symphony Orchestra – Lidholm, Stenhammar, Rosenberg
- 1988: Helén Jahren and Hans-Ola Ericsson – Sheng
- 1989: Joseph Martin Kraus – Funeral Music for Gustav III
- 1995:
  - Album: Åke Parmerud – Invisible Music
  - Artist: Dan Laurin
- 1996: Sven-David Sandström – The High Mass
- 1997: Anne Sofie von Otter and Bengt Forsberg – Wings in the Night
- 1998: Stefan Östersjö – Stefan Östersjö
- 1999: Daniel Börtz – Marie Antoinette
- 2000: Cecilia Zilliacus and Bengt Åke Lundin – Svenska violinsonater
- 2001: Håkan Hardenberger – Håkan Hardenberger Plays Swedish Trumpet Concertos
- 2002: Eric Ericson Chamber Choir – A Cradle Song – The Tyger
- 2003:
  - Ensemble: Gothenburg Symphony Orchestra and Neeme Järvi – Aurora: Nordiska orkesterfavoriter
  - Soloist: Cecilia Zilliacus – Cecilia Zilliacus violin
- 2004:
  - Ensemble: NorrlandsOperan symphony orchestra – Hilding Rosenberg: Lycksalighetens ö
  - Soloist: Martin Fröst – Mozart: Clarinet Concerto & Quintet
- 2005:
  - Ensemble: Cecilia Zilliacus, Johanna Persson and Kati Raitinen – Goldberg Variations BWV 988 for String Trio
  - Soloist: Anne Sofie von Otter – Watercolours
- 2006:
  - Ensemble: Eric Ericsons Kammarkör – Khoros
  - Soloist: Göran Söllscher – The Renaissance Album
- 2007:
  - Ensemble: Eric Ericsons Kammarkör – Eric Ericsons Chamber Choir
  - Soloist: Staffan Mårtensson – Clarinetto con forza
- 2008: Anne Sofie von Otter and Bengt Forsberg – Terezín – Theresienstadt
- 2009: Allmänna Sången and Anders Widmark – Resonanser: Swedish Choral Music – New Perspectives
- 2010: Sonanza Ensemble – Unheard Of – Again
- 2011: ZilliacusPerssonRaitinen – Wolfgang Amadeus Mozart: Divertimento
- 2012: Royal Stockholm Philharmonic Orchestra, Esa-Pekka Salonen, Alan Gilbert and Sakari Oramo – Anders Hillborg – Eleven Gates
- 2013: Anne Sofie von Otter – Sogno Barocco
- 2014: Karin Rehnqvist – Live
- 2015: Norrköping Symphony Orchestra and Christian Lindberg – Allan Pettersson Symphony No. 9
- 2016: Royal Stockholm Philharmonic Orchestra, Sakari Oramo, David Zinman and Esa-Pekka Salonen – Anders Hillborg – Sirens
- 2017: Västerås Sinfonietta, Helsingborgs symfoniorkester and Fredrik Burstedt – Mats Larsson Gothe: Symphony No. 2
- 2018: The Dahlkvist Quartet – Andrea Tarrodi: String Quartets
- 2019: Cecilia Zilliacus, Kati Raitinen and Bengt Forsberg – Amanda Maier: Volume 3
- 2020: Dan Laurin and Höör Barock – Golovinmusiken – The Golovin Music
- 2021: Jacob Kellermann and Christian Karlsen – Rodrigo, Coll & Harden: Guitar Works

=== Dansband of the Year ===
An award in the dansband category has been presented since the 1988 ceremony, then called Dance of the Year (Årets dans). It has been renamed several times, sometimes including Schlager in its name, and is now called Dansband of the Year (Årets dansband), as of the 2010 ceremony.

- 1988: Ingmar Nordströms (for Saxparty 14)
- 1989: Vikingarna (for Kramgoa låtar 14)
- 1990: Lasse Stefanz (for Mot nya mål)
- 1991: Sven-Ingvars (for På begäran)
- 1992: Vikingarna (for Kramgoa låtar 19)
- 1993: Arvingarna (for Coola killar)
- 1994: Lotta & Anders Engbergs orkester (for Kärlek gör mig tokig)
- 1995: Kikki Danielsson and Roosarna (for Vet du vad jag vet)
- 1996: Candela (for Candelas vita)
- 1997: Sten & Stanley (for Musik, dans & party 11)
- 1998: Thorleifs (for En liten ängel)
- 1999: Joyride (for God morgon världen)
- 2000: Barbados (for Barbados)
- 2001: Barbados (for Kom hem)
- 2002: Arvingarna (for Diamanter)
- 2003: Barbados (for Världen utanför)
- 2004: Jill Johnson (for Discography)
- 2005: Benny Anderssons orkester and Helen Sjöholm (for BAO!)
- 2006: Björn Skifs (for Decennier)
- 2007: Benny Anderssons orkester (for BAO på turné)
- 2008: Benny Anderssons orkester, Helen Sjöholm and Tommy Körberg (for BAO 3)
- 2009: Lasse Stefanz (for Rallarsväng)
- 2010: Larz-Kristerz (for Hem till dig)
- 2011: Lasse Stefanz (for Texas)
- 2012: Benny Anderssons orkester (for O klang och jubeltid)
- 2013: Lasse Stefanz (for Rocky Mountains)
- 2014: Elisa's (for Be mig! Se mig! Ge mig!)
- 2015: Elisa's (for Det ska va lätt)
- 2016: Hasse Andersson (for Guld och gröna skogar)
- 2017: Sannex for (Din sida sängen)
- 2018: Expanders (for Play That Rock 'n' Roll)
- 2019: Blender (for Gambla litegrann)
- 2020: Arvingarna (for I Do)
- 2021: Martinez (for Bubbelgum)

=== Electro/Dance of the Year ===
An award for electro and dance music was first presented at the 1993 ceremony, then called Modern Dance (Modern dans). It was later known as Club/Dance of the Year (Årets klubb/dans) and as Electro/Dance of the Year (Årets elektro/dans) as of the 2001 ceremony. For several years, the category was merged with the one for hip hop and soul. To be eligible, nominees must have released at least two singles or an album.

- 1993: Clubland (for Adventures Beyond Clubland)
- 1994: Stakka Bo (for Supermarket)
- 1995: The Latin Kings (for Välkommen till förorten)
- 1996: Infinite Mass (for The Infinite Patio)
- 1997: Blacknuss (for Allstars)
- 1998: Antiloop (for LP)
- 1999: E-Type (for Last Man Standing)
- 2000: Christian Falk (for Quel bordel)
- 2001: Antiloop (for Fastlane People)
- 2002: Spånka NKPG (for Volume 1)
- 2003: Koop (for Waltz for Koop)
- 2004: Hundarna från Söder (for Hundarna från Söder)
- 2005: Andreas Tilliander (for World Industries)
- 2006: September (for In Orbit)
- 2007: Christian Falk (for People Say)
- 2012: Rebecca & Fiona (for I Love You, Man!)
- 2013: Swedish House Mafia for (Until Now)
- 2014: Icona Pop (for This Is... Icona Pop)
- 2015: Rebecca & Fiona (for Beauty Is Pain)
- 2016: HNNY (for Sunday)
- 2017: Kornél Kovács (for The Bells)
- 2018: Axwell & Ingrosso (for "More Than You Know"/"I Love You")
- 2019: Neneh Cherry (for Broken Politics)
- 2020: Avicii (for Tim)
- 2021: Off the Meds (for Off the Meds)
- 2022: Swedish House Mafia (for "Moth to a Flame", "Lifetime", "It Gets Better")
- 2023: Swedish House Mafia (for Paradise Again)
- 2024: Cobrah (for Succubus)

=== Group of the Year ===
Group of the Year (Årets grupp) was first awarded at the 1969 ceremony, and subsequently during several other years.

- 1969: Made in Sweden (for Made in Sweden (with Love))
- 2003: Kent (for Vapen & ammunition)
- 2008: Kent (for Tillbaka till samtiden)
- 2009: The Soundtrack of Our Lives (for Communion)
- 2011: Johnossi (for Mavericks)

=== Hard Rock/Metal of the Year ===
An award for hard rock music has been presented since the 1993 ceremony; heavy metal music was included in the category starting with the 2012 ceremony.

- 1993: Headquake – Sator
- 1994: Deaf Dumb Blind – Clawfinger
- 1995: Mary Beats Jane – Mary Beats Jane
- 1996: Do Not Tailgate – Fireside
- 1997: Supershitty to the Max! – The Hellacopters
- 1998: Not Like Them – Misery Loves Co.
- 1999: Total 13 – Backyard Babies
- 2000: Naken, blästrad och skitsur – LOK
- 2001: The Haunted Made Me Do It – The Haunted
- 2002: Making Enemies Is Good – Backyard Babies
- 2003: Deliverance – Opeth
- 2004: One Kill Wonder – The Haunted
- 2005: Soundtrack to Your Escape – In Flames
- 2006: Candlemass – Candlemass
- 2007: Come Clarity – In Flames
- 2008: Latest Version of the Truth – Mustasch
- 2009: A Sense of Purpose – In Flames
- 2010: Mustasch – Mustasch
- 2011: Lawless Darkness – Watain
- 2012: Hisingen Blues – Graveyard
- 2013: Lights Out – Graveyard
- 2014: Infestissumam – Ghost
- 2015: At War with Reality – At the Gates
- 2016: Meliora – Ghost
- 2017: Popestar – Ghost
- 2018: Walk the Earth – Europe
- 2019: Down Below – Tribulation
- 2020: The Door to Doom – Candlemass
- 2021: Moment – Dark Tranquillity
- 2022: Where The Gloom Becomes Sound – Tribulation
- 2023: Impera – Ghost
- 2024: Foregone – In Flames
- 2025: The Last Will and Testament – Opeth
- 2026: Skeleta – Ghost

=== Jazz of the Year ===
An award for a jazz album has been presented since the first ceremony in 1969. For the 2000–2002 ceremonies, the category also included blues.

- 1969: Höstspelor – Jan Johansson
- 1970: Jan Allan-70 – Jan Allan
- 1971: Fancy – Arne Domnérus Trio
- 1972: 300.000 – Jan Johansson
- 1988: Your Touch – Monica Borrfors Quintet
- 1989: Thums Up – Chapter Seven
- 1990: Monica Z – Monica Zetterlund
- 1991: A Declaration of Independence – Red Mitchell
- 1992: Zigidap – Änglaspel
- 1993: Mikael Rådberg Big Band – Mikael Rådberg Big Band
- 1994: Sister Maj's Blouse – Joakim Milder, Bobo Stenson, Fredrik Norén, Palle Danielsson
- 1995: When the Smile Shines Through – Lina Nyberg Quintet
- 1996: The Good Life – Gunnar Bergsten
- 1997: Reflections – Bobo Stenson trio
- 1998: Winter in Venice – Esbjörn Svensson Trio
- 1999: Alla mina kompisar – Per "Texas" Johansson
- 2000: Bernt Rosengren Octet Plays Evert Taube – Bernt Rosengren Octet
- 2001: Seven Pieces – Lennart Åberg
- 2002: Paradise Open – Magnus Lindgren and the Swedish Radio Jazz Group
- 2003: Oddjob – Oddjob
- 2004: Seven Days of Falling – Esbjörn Svensson Trio
- 2005: Headspin – Goran Kajfeš
- 2006: Viaticum – Esbjörn Svensson Trio
- 2007: Tuesday Wonderland – Esbjörn Svensson Trio
- 2008: Alone with You – Rigmor Gustafsson
- 2009: Leucocyte – E.S.T.
- 2010: Attitude & Orbit Control – Jeanette Lindström
- 2011: Tonbruket – Dan Berglunds Tonbruket
- 2012: Dig It to the End – Tonbruket
- 2013: The Cherry Thing – Neneh Cherry and the Thing
- 2014: Nubium Swimtrip – Tonbruket
- 2015: Fusion for Fish – Daniel Karlsson Trio
- 2016: Folk – Oddjob
- 2017: Forevergreens – Tonbruket
- 2018: The Reason Why Vol. 3 – Goran Kajfeš Subtropic Arkestra
- 2019: Jag har funderat på en sak – Amanda Ginsburg
- 2020: Era spår – Martin Hederos
- 2021: I det lilla händer det mesta – Amanda Ginsburg

=== Lyricist of the Year ===
Lyricist of the Year (Årets textförfattare) was first awarded at the 1969 ceremony, and then annually since the 1989 ceremony. The award can be presented to an individual or a songwriting team, usually in connection to an album.

- 1969: Stikkan Anderson (for "Gröna små äpplen", "Mamma är lik sin mamma" and "Ljuva sextital")
- 1989: Mikael Wiehe (for Basin Street Blues)
- 1990: Marie Bergman
- 1991: Peter LeMarc
- 1992: Mauro Scocco
- 1993: Peter LeMarc
- 1994: Ulf Lundell
- 1995: Ulf Lundell
- 1996: Nisse Hellberg
- 1997: Thomas Öberg
- 1998: Wille Crafoord
- 1999: Petter
- 2000: Lars Winnerbäck
- 2001: Håkan Hellström
- 2002: Nina Persson
- 2003: Joakim Berg
- 2004: Jason Diakité (Timbuktu)
- 2005: Lars Winnerbäck (for Vatten under broarna)
- 2006: Jason Diakité (for Alla vill till himmelen men ingen vill dö)
- 2007: Anna Ternheim (for Separation Road)
- 2008: Annika Norlin (for Säkert!)
- 2009: Annika Norlin (for More Modern Short Stories from Hello Saferide)
- 2010: Thåström (for Kärlek är för dom)
- 2011: Håkan Hellström (for 2 steg från Paradise)
- 2012: Veronica Maggio and Christian Walz (for Satan i gatan)
- 2013: Peter Lemarc (for Svag doft av skymning)
- 2014: Håkan Hellström (for Det kommer aldrig va över för mig)
- 2015: Joakim Berg (for Tigerdrottningen)
- 2016: Erik Lundin (for Suedi)
- 2017: Frida Hyvönen (for Kvinnor och barn)
- 2018: Tove Lo (for Blue Lips (Lady Wood Phase II))
- 2019: Seinabo Sey (for I'm a Dream)
- 2020: Erik Lundin (for Zebrapojken)
- 2021: Ana Diaz
- 2022: Jaqe (for Filmen)
- 2023: Jonathan Johansson (for Om vi får leva)
- 2024: Karin Dreijer (for Radical Romantics)

=== Music Video of the Year ===
Music Video of the Year (Årets musikvideo) has been awarded since 1990 to the director of a music video that accompanies one song. The director must be a Swedish citizen or permanent resident. Voting for the category is done in two steps: first by a large jury, then by a specialized jury. In several years during the 2000s, the category was presented with MTV Sweden.

- 1990: "What's the Noise?" – Walk on Water
- 1991: "My Army of Lovers" – Army of Lovers
- 1992: "Det finns" – Mauro Scocco
- 1993: "Det finns inget bättre" – Peter LeMarc
- 1994: "The Truth" – Clawfinger
- 1995: "Fråga stjärnorna" – CajsaStina Åkerström
- 1996: "Hubbabubba" – Just D
- 1997: "Gravitation" – Kent
- 1998: "Save Tonight" – Eagle-Eye Cherry
- 1999: "Four Big Speakers" – Whale
- 2000: "Blow My Fuses" / "Absolutely Nothing" – Lambretta
- 2001: "Hiphopper" – Thomas Rusiak featuring Teddybears STHLM
- 2002: "Main Offender" – The Hives
- 2004: "You're the Storm" – The Cardigans
- 2006: "Dom som försvann" – Kent (director: Adam Berg)
- 2007: "Young Folks" – Peter Bjorn and John (director: Ted Malmros and Graham Samuels)
- 2008: "Det snurrar i min skalle" – Familjen (director: Johan Söderberg)
- 2009: "Catching Up" – They Live by Night
- 2010: "Välj mej" – Timbuktu
- 2012: "Flames" – Karl X Johan (director: Gustav Johansson)
- 2013: "Valtari" – Sigur Rós (director: Christian Larson)
- 2014: "Autobiography" – Jenny Wilson (director: Jenny Wilson and Daniel Wirtberg)
- 2015: "Monument" – Röyksopp and Robyn (director: Max Vitali)
- 2016: "Nothing but a Heartbeat" – Say Lou Lou (director: Joanna Nordahl)
- 2017: "Lazarus" – David Bowie (director: Johan Renck)
- 2018: "U" – Olsson (director: Filip Nilsson)
- 2019: "Rapin*" – Jenny Wilson (director: Gustaf Holtenäs)
- 2020: "Horse" – Salvatore Ganacci (director: Vedran Rupic)
- 2021: "Boycycle" – Salvatore Ganacci featuring Sébastien Tellier (director: Vedran Rupic)
- 2022: "It Gets Better" – Swedish House Mafia (director: Alexander Wessely)
- 2023: "What They Call Us" – Fever Ray (director: Martin Falck)
- 2024: "Countdown to Shutdown" – The Hives (director: Erik Kockum)

=== Newcomer of the Year ===
Newcomer of the Year (Årets nykomling) has been awarded since 1988 to an artist at the beginning of their musical career. Nominees must have released at least two songs or a debut album and must not have previously submitted for nomination. A group can be eligible if fewer than 50% of its members have previously released albums. The category was previously presented as Debut Popular Production of the Year (Årets debutpopulärproduktion) in 1970 and 1971.

- 1970: Pugh Rogefeldt (for Ja, dä ä dä)
- 1971: Skäggmanslaget (for Pjål, Gnäll och Ämmel)
- 1988: Orup
- 1989: Jakob Hellman
- 1990: Titiyo
- 1991: Magnus Johansson
- 1992: Stonecake
- 1993: Stefan Andersson
- 1994: Stakka Bo
- 1995: The Latin Kings
- 1996: Sophie Zelmani (for Sophie Zelmani)
- 1997: The Soundtrack of Our Lives (for Welcome to the Infant Freebase)
- 1998: Eagle-Eye Cherry (for Desireless)
- 1999: Petter (for Mitt sjätte sinne)
- 2000: Patrik Isaksson (for När verkligheten tränger sig på)
- 2001: Thomas Rusiak (for Magic Villa)
- 2002: Fattaru (for Fatta eld)
- 2003: The Sounds (for Living in America)
- 2004: José González (for Veneer)
- 2005: Anna Ternheim (for Somebody Outside)
- 2006: Laleh
- 2007: Veronica Maggio (for Vatten och bröd)
- 2008: Salem Al Fakir (for This Is Who I Am)
- 2009: Kleerup (for Kleerup)
- 2010: Erik Hassle (for Hassle)
- 2011: Oskar Linnros (for Vilja bli)
- 2012: Aleks (for Inte längre fiender)
- 2013: Icona Pop (for Icona Pop)
- 2014: Linda Pira (for Matriarken)
- 2015: Seinabo Sey (for For Madeleine)
- 2016: Sabina Ddumba (for "Not Too Young" and "Effortless")
- 2017: Bennett (for Hundra80)
- 2018: Jireel (for Jettad, "Tagga" and "Man of the Year")
- 2019: Imenella (for "Chagga" and "Moves remix")
- 2020: Einár (for Första klass and Nummer 1)
- 2021: Mona Masrour
- 2022: A36
- 2023: Cornelia Jakobs
- 2024: Eah Jé (for En liten låtidé)

=== Producer of the Year ===
Producer of the Year (Årets producent) was first awarded at the 1969 ceremony and next awarded in 1988 as Best Producer (Bästa producent); it has since been awarded annually.

- 1969: Anders Burman
- 1988: Anders Glenmark
- 1989: Dan Sundquist
- 1990: Magnus Frykberg
- 1991: Kaj Erixon
- 1992: Tony Thorén
- 1993: Johan Ekelund
- 1994: Jacob Hellner and Carl-Michael Herlöfsson
- 1995: Lasse Englund
- 1996: Pål Svenre
- 1997: Nille Perned
- 1998: Tony Thorén
- 1999: Tore Johansson
- 2000: Christian Falk
- 2001: Fabian "Phat Fabe" Torsson and Teddybears STHLM
- 2002: Tore Johansson
- 2003: Kent, Martin von Schmalensee and Zed
- 2004: Joakim Berg and Simon Nordberg
- 2005: Pelle Gunnerfeldt and the Hives (for Tyrannosaurus Hives)
- 2006: Laleh
- 2007: Karin Dreijer Andersson and Olof Dreijer (for Silent Shout)
- 2008: Salem Al Fakir (for This Is Who I Am)
- 2009: Kleerup (for Kleerup)
- 2010: Kent and Joshua (for Röd)
- 2011: RedOne (for Euphoria, Nicole Scherzinger, Lady Gaga)
- 2012: Masse Salazar
- 2013: Vittorio Grasso, Lorentz Alexander and Martin Sakarias (for Himlen är som mörkast när stjärnorna lyser starkast)
- 2014: Jenny Wilson (for Demand the Impossible!)
- 2015: Magnus Lidehäll (for Mapei and Seinabo Sey)
- 2016: Nisj
- 2017: Laleh Pourkarim (for Kristaller)
- 2018: Karin Dreijer, Paula Temple, Nídia, Deena Abdelwahed, Tami T, Peder Mannerfelt, Johannes Berglund (for Plunge)
- 2019: Simon Superti (for Adel and Dani M)
- 2020: Ilya Salmanzadeh
- 2021: Oscar Holter and Martin Sandberg
- 2022: Elvira Anderfjärd
- 2023: Klahr and Liohn
- 2024: Oscar Chase

=== Rock of the Year ===
Awards for rock music on their own have been presented since the 1990 ceremony. Prior to this, awards in combined Pop/Rock categories have been presented, a practice which sometimes continued into the 1990s and 2000s. It was previously separated into group and solo artist (male and female) categories, but has been one gender-neutral award since 2012.

- 1990:
  - Female: Eva Dahlgren (for Fria världen 1.989)
  - Group: Wilmer X (for Klubb Bongo)
  - Male: Jakob Hellman (for ...och stora havet)
- 1991:
  - Group: Freda' (for Undan för undan)
- 1992:
  - Group: Wilmer X (for Mambo feber)
- 1993:
  - Group: Popsicle (for Lacquer)
  - Male: Mats Ronander (for Himlen gråter för Elmore James)
- 1994:
  - Group: Atomic Swing (for A Car Crash in the Blue)
  - Male: Ulf Lundell (for Måne över Haväng)
- 1995:
  - Group: bob hund (for bob hund)
  - Male: Stefan Sundström and Apache (for Vitabergspredikan)
- 2004:
  - Group: The Cardigans (for Long Gone Before Daylight)
  - Solo: Moneybrother (for Blood Panic)
- 2005:
  - Group: The Hives (for Tyrannosaurus Hives)
  - Solo: Lars Winnerbäck (for Vatten under broarna)
- 2006:
  - Group: Kent (for Du & jag döden)
  - Solo: Thåström (for Skebokvarnsv. 209)
- 2007:
  - Group: Mando Diao (for Ode to Ochrasy)
- 2010: Kent (for Röd)
- 2012: Deportees (for Islands & Shores)
- 2013: The Soundtrack of Our Lives (for Throw It to the Universe)
- 2014: Håkan Hellström (for Det kommer aldrig va över för mig)
- 2015: Kent (for Tigerdrottningen)
- 2016: Deportees (for The Big Sleep)
- 2017: Kent (for Då som nu för alltid)
- 2018: Thåström (for Centralmassivet)
- 2019: Hurula (for Oss är allt)
- 2020: Hurula (for Klass)
- 2021: Hurula (for Jehova)

=== Song of the Year ===
Song of the Year (Årets låt) has been awarded since 1990. Previously decided by the public, it is now chosen by a jury from the ten most popular songs of the year, based on sales, airplay, and streaming.

- 1990: "Ängeln i rummet" – Eva Dahlgren
- 1991: "En del av mitt hjärta" – Tomas Ledin
- 1992: "Himlen runt hörnet" – Lisa Nilsson
- 1992: "Vem tänder stjärnorna?" – Eva Dahlgren
- 1994: "Lilla fågel blå" – Staffan Hellstrand
- 1995: "När vi gräver guld i USA" – Glenmark/Eriksson/Strömstedt
- 1996: "Det vackraste" – Cecilia Vennersten
- 1997: "Gå & fiska!" – Gyllene Tider
- 1998: "Burnin'" – Cue
- 1999: "Big Big World" – Emilia
- 2000: "Du får göra som du vill" – Patrik Isaksson
- 2001: "It Takes a Fool to Remain Sane" – The Ark
- 2002: "Come Along" – Titiyo
- 2003: "Dom andra" – Kent
- 2004: "Här kommer alla känslorna (på en och samma gång)" – Per Gessle
- 2005: "Ingen vill veta var du köpt din tröja" – Raymond & Maria
- 2006: (by TV viewers): "Money for Nothing" – Darin
- 2007: (by TV viewers): "7milakliv" – Martin Stenmarck
- 2008: (by TV viewers): "Om du lämnade mig nu" – Lars Winnerbäck and Miss Li
- 2009: (by TV viewers): "Jennie Let Me Love You" – E.M.D.
- 2010: "Dance with Somebody" – Mando Diao
- 2011: (by TV viewers): "Dancing on My Own" – Robyn
- 2012: "Levels" – Avicii
- 2013: "Vart jag än går" – Stiftelsen
- 2014: "Det kommer aldrig va över för mig" – Håkan Hellström
- 2015: "Habits (Stay High)" – Tove Lo
- 2016: "Dör för dig" – Danny Saucedo
- 2017: "If I Were Sorry" – Frans
- 2018: "Only You" – Zara Larsson
- 2019: "Missing U" – Robyn
- 2020: "SOS" – Avicii featuring Aloe Blacc
- 2021: "Svag" – Victor Leksell
- 2022: "Tystnar i luren" – Miriam Bryant and Victor Leksell
- 2023: "Fakka ur" – Loam and Adaam
- 2024: "Ikväll igen" – Bolaget

=== Songwriter of the Year ===
Songwriter of the Year (Årets kompositör) was first awarded at the 1969 ceremony, and then annually since the 1989 ceremony. The award can be presented to an individual or a songwriting team.

- 1969: Cornelis Vreeswijk (for Tio vackra visor och Personliga Person)
- 1989: Per Gessle (for Look Sharp!)
- 1990: Orup
- 1991: Anders Glenmark
- 1992: Eva Dahlgren
- 1993: Mauro Scocco
- 1994: Niclas Frisk
- 1995: Mauro Scocco
- 1996: Anders Hillborg
- 1997: Benny Andersson
- 1998: Esbjörn Svensson
- 1999: Peter Svensson
- 2000: Patrik Isaksson
- 2001: Jörgen Elofsson
- 2002: Nina Persson and Niclas Frisk
- 2003: Joakim Berg
- 2004: Per Gessle
- 2005: Marit Bergman (for Baby Dry Your Eye)
- 2006: Robyn and Klas Åhlund (for Robyn)
- 2007: Karin Dreijer Andersson and Olof Dreijer (for Silent Shout)
- 2008: Salem Al Fakir (for This Is Who I Am)
- 2009: Kleerup (for Kleerup)
- 2010: Amanda Jenssen and Pär Wiksten (for Happyland)
- 2011: Klas Åhlund and Robyn (for Body Talk)
- 2012: Veronica Maggio and Christian Walz (for Satan i gatan)
- 2013: Klara Söderberg and Johanna Söderberg (for The Lion's Roar)
- 2014: Salem Al Fakir, Vincent Pontare and Magnus Lidehäll
- 2015: Max Martin
- 2016: Peter Svensson
- 2017: Frida Hyvönen (for Kvinnor och barn)
- 2018: Noonie Bao
- 2019: Ludwig Göransson (for Childish Gambino and others)
- 2020: Maria Jane Smith and Victor Thell
- 2021: Ane Brun
- 2022: Agnes Carlsson, Vincent Pontare, Salem Al Fakir, Kerstin Ljungström and Maria Hazell
- 2023: Ludwig Göransson (for Black Panther: Wakanda Forever)
- 2024: Ludwig Göransson (for Oppenheimer)
