= Ljungaverk (album) =

Studio album by Stiftelsen
- Released: 25 September 2012
- Genre: pop, rock
- Length: 39:40
- Label: Universal
- Producer: Chris Rehn

Stiftelsen chronology
Ljungaverk (2012)	Dopet (2013)

Ljungaverk was released in 2012, and is the debut studio album from Swedish pop rock band Stiftelsen.

== Track listing ==
No.	Title	Length
1.	"Viljan"	4:12
2.	"Du är ju allting"	4:07
3.	"Nu får du gå hem..."	3:36
4.	"I dag"	5:50
5.	"När herr Ångström hade fest"	3:59
6.	"Vildhjärta"	4:23
7.	"Härifrån"	1:55
8.	"Vart jag än går"	3:28
9.	"Ur balans"	3:16
10.	"Rotlös"	4:54
Total length:		39:40

Bonus track (Tunes only)
No.	Title	Length
11.	"Vildhjärta (Sunday version)"	4:07

== Musicians ==
- Robert Pettersson – vocals, guitar
- Micke Eriksson - guitar
- Arne Johansson - bass
- Martin Källström - drums

== Charts ==
=== Weekly charts ===
Chart (2012–2018)	Peak position
Swedish Albums (Sverigetopplistan)	2

=== Year-end charts ===
Chart	Year	Position
Swedish Albums (Sverigetopplistan)	2012	17
Swedish Albums (Sverigetopplistan)	2013	22
Swedish Albums (Sverigetopplistan)	2014	36
Swedish Albums (Sverigetopplistan)	2015	52
Swedish Albums (Sverigetopplistan)	2016	86
Swedish Albums (Sverigetopplistan)	2017	71
Swedish Albums (Sverigetopplistan)	2018	84
Swedish Albums (Sverigetopplistan)	2025	70
