= Cajsa Stina Åkerström (album) =

Studio album by CajsaStina Åkerström
- Released: 1994
- Length: circa 42 minutes
- Label: Warner Music Group (CD); Metronome (cassette tape)
- Producer: Kaj Erixon

CajsaStina Åkerström chronology
Cajsa Stina Åkerström (1994)	Klädd för att gå (1996)

Cajsa Stina Åkerström is a 1994 studio album by CajsaStina Åkerström. and her debut album.

== Track listing ==
1. Fråga stjärnorna
2. Änglarna håller hov ikväll
3. Du (vill se dig igen)
4. Om jag var din flicka
5. Minnen
6. Vill du veta vem jag är
7. Glöm inte bort
8. Som en blixt (en klarblå dag)
9. Alla blickar du gav
10. Mirakel

== Personnel ==
- Sven Lindvall - bass
- Kristoffer Wallman - keyboard
- Mattias Torell - guitar
- Johan Vävare – synthesizer

== Charts ==
Chart (1994)	Peak position
Sweden (Sverigetopplistan)	4
