= Cirklar =

Studio album by CajsaStina Åkerström
- Released: 1998
- Length: ~41 minutes
- Label: Warner Music

CajsaStina Åkerström chronology
Klädd för att gå (1996)	Cirklar (1998)	Folkmusik på svenska (2001)

Cirklar is a 1998 studio album by CajsaStina Åkerström.

== Track listing ==
All lyrics and music by CajsaStina Åkerström

1. Cirklar – 3:17
2. Vänd dig om – 4:29
3. Revansch – 4:19
4. Skärvor – 4:06
5. Rytm – 3:59
6. Släck ljuset och kom – 4:37
7. Två – 4:54
8. Lågtryck – 3:52
9. Nu – 4:04
10. Vintermörker (kom, kom, kom) – 3:04

== Personnel ==
- CajsaStina Åkerström – vocals
- Kristoffer Wallman, Niklas Medin –keyboard
- Henrik Jansson, Lars Halapi, Matias Thorell –guitar
- Sture Lindvall – bass
- Magnus Frykberg – drums

== Charts ==
Chart (1998)	Peak position
Sweden (Sverigetopplistan)	25
