= Sverige–Sovjet =

- Genre: entertainment
- Country of origin: Sweden
- Original language: Swedish

Original release
- Network: SVT
- Release: 2 November – 21 December 1996

Sverige–Sovjet was a television entertainment programme. It aired lived over SVT between 2 November-21 December 1996.

== Guests ==
- Candela
- Phil Collins
- James Hetfield
- Anni-Frid Lyngstad
