= Silence Is Wild =

Studio album by Frida Hyvönen
- Released: 29 October 2008
- Recorded: 2008
- Genre: Alternative
- Label: Licking Fingers
- Producer: Jari Haapalainen

Frida Hyvönen chronology
Frida Hyvönen Gives You: Music from the Dance Performance PUDEL (2007)	Silence Is Wild (2008)	Frida Hyvönen Gives You: Music from Drottninglandet (2009)

Professional ratings
Aggregate scores
Source	Rating
Metacritic	78/100
Review scores
Source	Rating
AllMusic	4/5 stars

Silence Is Wild is the third album by Swedish singer-songwriter Frida Hyvönen. It was released on 29 October 2008, in Scandinavia, and 4 November 2008, in North America. In Sweden, the album debuted at number nine in the official albums chart, making it her highest-charting album to date.

== Track listing ==
1. "Dirty Dancing" – 4:06
2. "Enemy Within" – 3:48
3. "Highway 2 U" – 4:09
4. "London!" – 4:03
5. "My Cousin" – 2:57
6. "Science" – 3:32
7. "Scandinavian Blonde" – 2:05
8. "December" – 4:05
9. "Birds" – 2:50
10. "Pony" – 3:05
11. "Sic Transit Gloria" – 4:08
12. "Oh Shanghai" – 5:42
13. "Why Do You Love Me So Much" – 3:12

== Charts ==
=== Weekly charts ===
Chart (2008)	Peak position
Swedish Albums (Sverigetopplistan)	9

=== Year-end charts ===
Chart (2008)	Position
Swedish Albums (Sverigetopplistan)	96
