= Klädd för att gå =

Studio album by CajsaStina Åkerström
- Released: 23 February 1996
- Length: circa 43 minutes
- Label: Warner Music (CD); Metronome (cassette tape)
- Producer: Kaj Erixon

CajsaStina Åkerström chronology
Cajsa Stina Åkerström (1994)	Klädd för att gå (1996)	Cirklar (1998)

Klädd för att gå is a 1996 studio album by CajsaStina Åkerström.

== Track listing ==
1. Kom — 5:02
2. Om bara för en dag — 4:20
3. Socker, knäckebröd & choklad — 4:06
4. Långt härifrån — 3:48
5. Klädd för att gå — 3:47
6. Kanske en ängel — 3:47
7. Tänk om — 5:09
8. Tid för att tänka — 3:52
9. Lyckan kommer och lyckan går — 3:38
10. Mitt hjärtas begär — 5:31

== Contributors ==
- Magnus Frykberg - drums
- Sven Lindvall - bass guitar
- Kristoffer Wallman - keyboard
- Lasse Halapi - guitar

== Chart positions ==
Chart (1996)	Peak position
Norway	27
Sweden	1
