= Blå vind =

Studio album by Candela
- Released: 21 January 2002
- Recorded: Kellers källare, Copenhagen, Denmark, May–July 2001
- Genre: dansband music
- Length: circa 39 minutes
- Label: Frituna

Candela chronology
Candela Collection (1996)	Blå vind (2002)	Upp till dans (2009)

Blå vind is a 2002 studio album by Candela. For the album, the band was awarded a Grammis Award in the "Dansband of the Year" category.

== Track listing ==
1. Inom mig (Per-Anders Forsén)
2. Det är bara du (Jonas Sandquist)
3. Vinterbarn (Jonas Warnerbring - Fredrik Möller)
4. Some Days You Gotta Dance (Troy Johnson - Marshall Logan)
5. En ros i regn (Roland Andersson - Ingegerd Lindh - Lasse Lindh)
6. Du eller jag (Peter Lundblad - Bengt Palmers)
7. Jah finns där (Calle Kindbom - Carl Lösnitz)
8. Your Mama Don't Dance (Kennt Loggins - Jim Messina)
9. Minnet av dig ( Jan Gustavsson - Eva-Maria Lidèn)
10. Det måste va' kärlek (Ulf Brusquini - Billy Heil - Åke Lindfors)
11. Blå vind (Calle Kindbom - Carl Lösnitz)
12. Steg för steg (Tommy Kaså - Anica E. Stenberg)
13. Stanna en stund (PeO Pettersson)
14. Jag önskar mig (Per-Ola Lindholm)
