= Dopet =

Studio album by Stiftelsen
- Released: 30 October 2013
- Genre: Pop, rock
- Length: 29:21
- Label: Universal
- Producer: Chris Rehn

Stiftelsen chronology
Ljungaverk (2012)	Dopet (2013)	Kom som du är (2015)

Dopet (English: the baptism) is the second studio album by Swedish pop rock band Stiftelsen. It was released in 2013. All tracks on the album were written by Robert Petterson, the group's main vocalist. Dopet debuted at number one on the Swedish Albums Chart.

== Track listing ==
All tracks are written by Robert Petterson (singer of the band).

No.	Title	Length
1.	"Till landet Ingenstans"	3:27
2.	"Utanför din dörr"	4:06
3.	"Avalon"	2:42
4.	"Vi vill ha mer"	4:31
5.	"En annan värld"	3:48
6.	"En gång i maj"	3:55
7.	"Hövdingen"	6:52
Total length:		29:21

== Musicians ==
- Robert Pettersson - vocals, guitar
- Micke Eriksson - guitar
- Arne Johansson - bass
- Martin Källström - drums

== Charts ==
=== Weekly charts ===
Chart (2013–2014)	Peak position
Swedish Albums (Sverigetopplistan)	1

=== Year-end charts ===
Chart (2013)	Position
Swedish Albums (Sverigetopplistan)	21
Chart (2014)	Position
Swedish Albums (Sverigetopplistan)	77
