= Frida Hyvönen Gives You: Music from the Dance Performance PUDEL =

Studio album by Frida Hyvönen
- Released: 24 January 2007
- Recorded: 2006–2007
- Genre: Alternative
- Length: 41:13
- Label: Licking Fingers
- Producer: Frida Hyvönen, Jon Bergström

Frida Hyvönen chronology
Until Death Comes (2005)	Frida Hyvönen Gives You: Music from the Dance Performance PUDEL (2007)	Silence Is Wild (2008)

Frida Hyvönen Gives You: Music from the Dance Performance PUDEL is the second album released by Swedish Singer-songwriter Frida Hyvönen.

About the album Hyvönen wrote:

This record is part of a series where I intend to present various works that are not necessarily in the full-length album format, may it be an experiment, a collaboration or a new, very foul language. This music was originally composed for, and performed in, PUDEL, a dance performance by choreographer Dorte Olsen, in the fall of 2005. In this recording the songs have left the stage, and entered the realms of your imagination, with new arrangements for a small orchestra, piano and voice.

== Track listing ==
1. "Intro" – 0:38
2. "Fall Is My Lover" – 3:14
3. "See How I Came Into Town" – 3:33
4. "Paus Piano" – 1:12
5. "New Messiah" – 2:12
6. "Came a Storm" – 2:46
7. "Cricket" – 1:55
8. "Oh! Oh!" – 2:59
9. "This Night I Recall You" – 5:04
10. "Outro" – 0:22

All songs written by Frida Hyvönen

== Personnel ==
- Frida Hyvönen: piano, vocals
- Bebe Risenfors: trumpet, double bass, clarinet, tuba, accordion, choir
- Jon Bergström: viola da gamba, choir
- Jonas Hagberth: choir
- The Amanda Quartet:
  - Åsa Håkansson – violin, choir
  - Anna Rosén – violin, choir
  - Markus Falkbring – viola, choir
  - Mattias Rodrick – cello, choir
- Jon Bergström: Production, string arrangements, mixing
- Jonas Hagberth: Engineering
- Ulla Lannér: Catering
- Joachim Ekermann: Mixing
- Håkan Åkesson: Mastering
- Lisa Millberg: Cover design
- Liselotte Watkins: Illustration
