= Until Death Comes =

Studio album by Frida Hyvönen
- Released: 2005
- Studios: Atlantis, Stockholm, Sweden
- Genre: singer-songwriter
- Length: 28:40
- Labels: Licking Fingers; Secretly Canadian; Chapter Music
- Producers: Jari Hapalainen; Janne Hansson

Frida Hyvönen chronology
Until Death Comes (2005)	Frida Hyvönen Gives You: Music from the Dance Performance PUDEL (2007)

Professional ratings
Review scores
Source	Rating
AllMusic	4/5 stars
Chicago Reader	
Pitchfork	7.2/10

Until Death Comes is the debut album by Frida Hyvönen. The album was recorded at Atlantis Studios in Stockholm and released by Swedish label Licking Fingers in 2005, American label Secretly Canadian in 2006 and Australian label Chapter Music in 2007.

The album received generally favorable reviews. According to AllMusic, "There's nothing particularly new or even original about Hyvönen's music, but she has a kind of naïve wisdom that comes through in her lack of pretense and complication and makes her very likable, and makes Until Death Comes a very compelling album, its strength lying in its plainness and truth".

== Track listing ==
1. "I Drive My Friend" – 2:38
2. "Djuna!" – 2:31
3. "Valerie" – 1:29
4. "You Never Got Me Right" – 1:50
5. "Once I Was a Serene Teenaged Child" – 2:48
6. "Today, Tuesday" – 5:08
7. "Come Another Night" – 2:02
8. "N.Y." – 4:39
9. "The Modern" – 2:01
10. "Straight Thin Line" – 3:34
