= Fråga stjärnorna =

Single by CajsaStina Åkerström

from the album Cajsa Stina Åkerström
- A-side: "Fråga stjärnorna"
- B-side: "Som en blixt (en klarblå dag)"
- Released: 1994
- Genre: Swedish pop
- Label: Warner
- Songwriter: CajsaStina Åkerström

"Fråga stjärnorna" is a song written by CajsaStina Åkerström, and recorded by herself on her debut album Cajsa Stina Åkerström. It was also released as a single in the same year. The single peaked at number 12 on the Swedish Singles Chart.

Also tested for Svensktoppen, the song charted for nine weeks between 9 April-14 June 1994, peaking at second position.

== Charts ==
Chart (1994)	Peak position
Sweden	12
