= Candela Collection =

Compilation album by Candela
- Released: October 1996
- Recorded: 1994–1996
- Genre: dansband music
- Label: KM

Candela chronology
Candelas vita (1995)	Candela Collection (1996)	Blå vind (2002)

Candela Collection is a 1996 compilation album by Swedish dansband Candela.

== Track listing ==
1. Att det i stjärnorna står skrivet (Warnerbring/Möller)
2. Malmö - Köpenhamn (Stråhed - Svenling)
3. Varje litet ögonkast (Every Little Thing) (Carter - Andersson - Rosin - Månsson)
4. Du finns i mina tankar (Ebbesson)
5. Säg har du glömt (Jensen)
6. Galen (Nelson/Lindfors)
7. Av hela mitt hjärta (Månsson - Lösnitz)
8. Nya vingar (Palm - Georgsson)
9. Där vallmoblomman står (Stråhed)
10. Place de Trocadero (Stråhed)
11. När du ser på mig (B. Heil)
12. Lycklig igen (Stråhed)
13. Som om du var här (Eriksson)
14. Nätterna med dig (Thunqvist - Svenling)
15. Bang Bang (Norell/Oson/Bard)
16. Jag önskar mig (Lindholm)
17. I mina drömmar (Eriksson)
18. Viva! Fernando Garcia (Månsson -Svenling)
19. Älskar du mig (Möller)
20. We Are Family (Rogers - Edwards)
