= Dan Laurin =

Swedish recorder player

Dan Laurin (January 19, 1960 in Jönköping, Sweden) is a Swedish recorder player.

== Life and career ==
Laurin studied under Ulla Wijk, Paul Nauta and Eva Legêne at the Conservatories of Odense and Copenhagen from 1976 to 1982. Since 1980 he has performed on stage and recorded with the Drottningholm Baroque Ensemble, the Bach Collegium Japan, Berlin Philharmonic Orchestra, the Polish ensemble Arte dei Suonatori, and many other ensembles, with regular tours of Japan, the United States, Israel, Australia and across Europe.

His 1994 album The Swedish Recorder earned him a prize from the Swedish Association of Composers. This, along with three other albums (The Japanese Recorder, Vivaldi Recorder Concertos and Telemann/Bach (Fantasias/Solo works)) resulted in a Grammis award. Commissions include recorder concertos by Daniel Börtz, Henrik Strindberg, Fredrick Österling, as well as by Chiell Meijering, Vito Palumbo and Christofer Elgh.

Laurin is a member of the Royal Swedish Academy of Music, and in 2001 he received the medal Litteris et Artibus from the King of Sweden. In 2011, he received the Interpretation Prize from the Royal Swedish Academy of Music.

Laurin collaborated with the Australian instrument maker Fred Morgan to advance recorder design, resulting in a succession of reconstructions of instruments from earlier times, including an instrument that was designed specifically for Laurin's 9-CD recording of Jacob van Eyck's monumental Der Fluyten Lust-hof. Laurin has trained some of the leading young recorder virtuosi in Europe and beyond.

Laurin has held professorships at Hochschule für Künste in Bremen, Carl Nielsen Academy of Music in Odense, Conservatory of Music in Gothenburg and the Royal Conservatory of Music in Copenhagen. Laurin is professor of the recorder at Stockholm's Royal College of Music.

Laurin is married to harpsichord and piano player Anna Paradiso.
