= Candelas vita =

Studio album by Candela
- Released: November 1995
- Genre: Dansband music
- Length: ~44 minutes
- Label: Mariann Grammofon

Candela chronology
Candelas blå (1994)	Candelas vita (1995)	Candela Collection (1996)

Candelas vita is a 1995 studio album by Candela. For the album, the band was awarded a Grammis Award in the "Dansband of the Year" category. With the song "Jag önskar mig", which went on the Swedish record chart Svensktoppen in November 1995, the band got a hit.

== Track listing ==
1. Sommar en dag i juni (Ulf Rundberg)
2. Vi rymmer i natt (Peter Bergqvist - Hans Backström)
3. Där vallmoblomman står (Dan Stråhed)
4. Det finaste som finns (Thomas Thörnholm - Patrick Öhlund)
5. Ingenting är bättre (Calle Kindbom - Carl Lösnitz)
6. Säg aldrig farväl (Bo Nilsson)
7. Kan vi träffas nå'n gång (Ann Orson - Blanche Carte/Monica Forsberg)
8. Malmö-Köpenhamn (Dan Stråhed - Kaj Svenling)
9. Jag ville vara nära dig (Mike Hawker - Ivor Raymonde/Britt Lindeborg)
10. Galen (Willie Nelsson/Åke Lindfors)
11. Ängel i natt (Peter Bergqvist - Hans Backström)
12. Jag borde gå (Per-Olof Löfgren)
13. Stanna en stund (PeO Pettersson)
14. Jag önskar mig (Per-Ola Lindholm)
