= Candelas blå =

Studio album by Candela
- Released: September 1994
- Genre: Dansband music
- Length: circa 46 minutes
- Label: KM

Candela chronology
Candelas blå (1994)	Candelas vita (1995)

Candelas blå is the debut studio album by Swedish dansband Candela.

== Track listing ==
1. Du finns i mina tankar (I. Ebbesson)
2. På solokvist (D. Stråhed)
3. Nätterna med dig (J. Thunqvist - K. Svenling)
4. Viva! Fernando Garcia (B. Månsson - K. Svenling)
5. Det är så lätt att leva livet (T. Hatch - Sven-Olle)
6. Du har fått mig att falla (Only a Fool) (Gebauer - Reilly -Hodgson - Lindfors)
7. En väg till ditt hjärta (P. Bergqvist - H. Backström)
8. Av hela mitt hjärta (B. Månsson - C. Lösnitz)
9. Vikingarnas land (D. Stråhed)
10. En sång om kärleken (J. Öhlund - Å. Lindfors)
11. Väntar på dig (B. Heil)
12. Hanky Panky (Madonna L Ciccione - Patrick Leanard)
13. När du ser på mig (B. Heil)
14. Blott du och jag (Dej og mej) (G. Keller - K. Heik- P. Hermansson)
