= The Night Visitor (album) =

Studio album by Anna Ternheim
- Released: October 28, 2011
- Length: CD1 – 45:55; CD2 – 22:13; Total – 68:08

Anna Ternheim chronology
Leaving on a Mayday (2008)	The Night Visitor (2011)

The Night Visitor is Swedish singer-songwriter Anna Ternheim's fifth album, released on October 28, 2011.

== Track listing ==
#	Title	Length
1.	Solitary Move	3:53
2.	The Longer the Waiting (The Sweeter the Kiss) (with Dave Ferguson)	3:51
3.	Lorelie-Marie	4:26
4.	Ghost of а Man	3:45
5.	What Remains?	3:34
6.	Bow Your Head	5:23
7.	Walking Aimlessly	3:52
8.	God Don't Know	2:25
9.	Black Light Shines	4:12
10.	All Shadows	3:43
11.	Come to Bed	3:23
12.	Dearest Dear	3:28

== CD2 – Live on the Porch ==
#	Title	Length
1.	Black Light Shines	4:21
2.	Walking Aimlessly	3:45
3.	Lorelie-Marie	4:22
4.	Bow Your Head	5:46
5.	The Longer the Waiting (The Sweeter the Kiss) (with Dave Ferguson)	3:59

== Chart performance ==
In its first week of release, the album entered Sverigetopplistan, the official Swedish Albums Chart straight in at No. 2. It was also released the same week in Norway, entering VG-lista, the official Norwegian Albums Chart straight at No. 20.

=== Weekly charts ===
Chart (2011)	Peak position
German Albums (Offizielle Top 100)	72
Norwegian Albums (VG-lista)	16
Swedish Albums (Sverigetopplistan)	2

=== Year-end charts ===
Chart (2011)	Position
Swedish Albums (Sverigetopplistan)	28
Chart (2012)	Position
Swedish Albums (Sverigetopplistan)	98
