= Vart jag än går =

Single

from the album Ljungaverk
- A-side: "Vart jag än går"
- Released: May 30, 2012
- Songwriters: Arne Johansson; Robban Pettersson; Micke Eriksson; Martin Källström

"Vart jag än går" is a song recorded by Stiftelsen on their 2012 studio album Ljungaverk. In 2013, it won a Grammis Award for "Song of the year 2012".

On 5 August 2012, it entered Svensktoppen, charting for 40 weeks before leaving the chart. It also peaked at number one on the Swedish Singles Chart.

== Charts ==
=== Weekly charts ===
Chart (2012–2013)	Peak position
Sweden (Sverigetopplistan	1

=== Year-end charts ===
Chart (2012)	Position
Sweden (Sverigetopplistan)	5
