= Astronaut (Salem Al Fakir album) =

Studio album by Salem
- Released: March 18, 2009
- Genre: Melodic pop
- Length: 40:01
- Label: Capitol

Salem chronology
This Is Who I Am (2007)	Astronaut (2009)	Ignore This (2010)

Astronaut is the second studio album by Salem Al Fakir, released on March 18, 2009. The album was credited to his mononym Salem rather than his full name Salem Al Fakir as in the case of his debut album This Is Who I Am.

== Track listing ==
1. "Cold Shower" - 3:37
2. "Astronaut" - 3:09
3. "Now's the Time" -3:29
4. "It's Only You (Part II)" - 3:30
5. "Roxy" - 4:04
6. "Bluest Eyes" - 3:43
7. "Twelve Fingers" - 3:38
8. "Purple Lady" - 3:15
9. "Mirror" - 3:33
10. "One of the Others" - 3:59
11. "Black Sun (Demo)" - 3:04

== Charts ==
Chart (2009)	Peak position
Swedish Albums (Sverigetopplistan)	7
