= Ignore This =

Studio album by Salem Al Fakir
- Released: 2010
- Genre: Pop, Soul
- Length: 40:01
- Label: EMI

Salem Al Fakir chronology
Astronaut (2009)	Ignore This (2010)

Ignore This is the third studio album from Swedish singer Salem Al Fakir, released in 2010.

== Track listing ==
All tracks are written by Salem Al Fakir

No.	Title	Length
1.	"The Song I Never Wrote"	0:58
2.	"4 O'Clock"	3:34
3.	"Virgin Mary"	3:29
4.	"Red Rock"	3:13
5.	"Keep on Walking"	3:16
6.	"This Is For"	4:10
7.	"Part Of It"	3:46
8.	"Brooklyn Sun"	3:40
9.	"Don't Wanna Talk About It"	1:50
10.	"Bloody Breakfast"	4:20
11.	"Split My Personality"	3:15
12.	"Cowboys & Dinosaurs"	2:17
13.	"I'm So Happy"	4:13
Total length:		40:01

== Charts ==
=== Weekly charts ===
Chart (2010–11)	Peak position
Swedish Albums (Sverigetopplistan)	1

=== Year-end charts ===
Chart (2010)	Position
Swedish Albums (Sverigetopplistan)	24
