= Peter LeMarc =

Swedish singer and songwriter (born 1958)

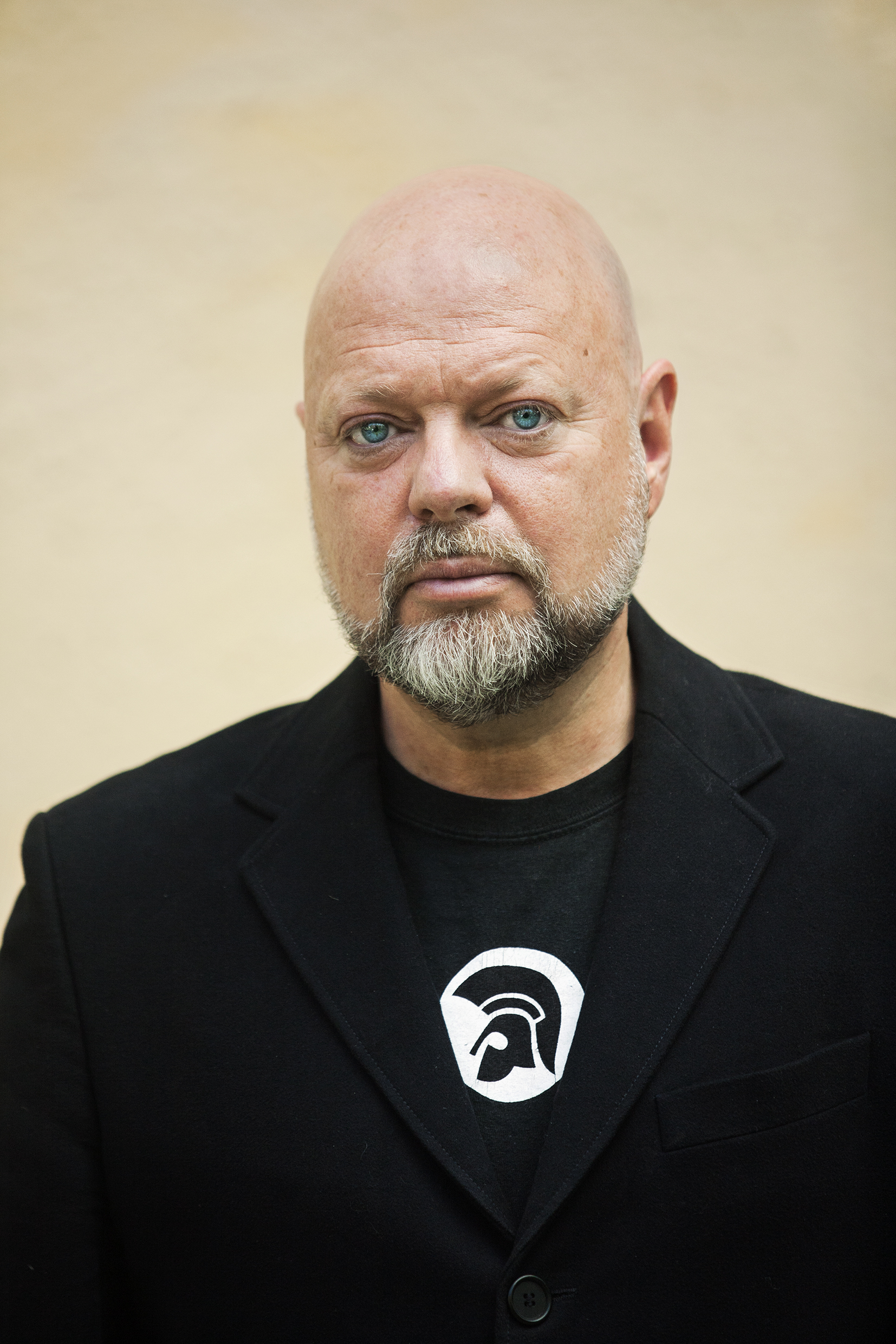

Background information
- Birth name: Peter Lenn Marc Fransson
- Born: 23 October 1958 (age 66); Trollhättan, Sweden
- Genres: Pop, Rock, Country, Soul
- Years active: 1979–present
- Website: www.lemarc.se

Peter LeMarc (born Peter Lenn Marc Fransson, 23 October 1958) is a Swedish singer and songwriter. He made his record debut in 1982 and broke through in 1987, when the album Peter LeMarc sold gold. Since then he has released several successful albums that have sold gold and platinum, and been awarded seven Swedish Grammy Awards.

== Biography ==
=== Background ===
Peter LeMarc was born in 1958 in the industrial town of Trollhättan, to parents May and Lennart. His middle name, Lenn-Marc (also spelled Lenmarc) was a compromise; his mother wanted his name to be Marcus, while his father prompted on the name Lennart.

At a young age, LeMarc discovered music through The Beatles, Bob Dylan, The Rolling Stones and other bands of the 1960s and 70s. In his teenage years, he played in a number of bands in the Trollhättan area.
His father died of cancer in 1977, something LeMarc often returns to in his songs, such as "Jag ska gå hel ur det här", "Närmare gränsen" and "Drivved".

LeMarc moved to Gothenburg in 1979 and joined the band Box 81. In 1982 he moved to Stockholm. Soon after he released his debut album Buick. The record was well received in the press, but struggled to achieve commercial success. Two more albums met the same fate.

=== Breakthrough ===
By 1987 LeMarc had created a reputation as a prolific live artist. In August LeMarc released his fifth album, which would become his huge breakthrough, selling gold (50,000 copies) and earned him his first Swedish Grammy Award.

In February 1990 Välkommen hem! was released, earning him another gold record. The album was followed by an acclaimed tour, resulting in LeMarc receiving another Grammy, as lyricist of the year.

In August 1991, Sången dom spelar när filmen är slut was released to wide acclaim. It contained some of his most prominent songs, such as "Little Willie John", "Evelina" and "Ett av dom sätt". The record soon sold platinum (100,000 copies).
Det finns inget bättre came out in December 1992 and gave him his second platinum record, as well as two Grammys : one for lyricist of the year and one for video of the year.

LeMarc premiered his most acclaimed tour to date in his hometown of Trollhättan, in February 1993. The concert met immediate critical praise. These appearances at Cirkus in Stockholm were later released as the live album Buona Sera! Peter LeMarc Livslevande.

In March 1995, Bok med blanka sidor was released, featuring prominent songs such as "Tess" and "Fyra steg i det blå". The record sold gold and LeMarc received another Grammis, as Male artist of the year. In 1996 the two collections LeMarcologi and LeMarxism were released. The former sold platinum. In March 1997, LeMarc entered the Decibel studio in Stockholm to record his eleventh studio album - Nio broars väg. The album would go on to sell platinum.

=== Later career ===
After enjoying a hugely popular career from 1987 to 1997, and after a hiatus, he made a comeback starting 2003 onwards with a series of new albums reaching the top of the Swedish Albums Chart.

In addition to a prolific solo career, he has also written a number of songs for a variety of popular artists including Anna-Lotta Larsson, Jerry Williams, Totta Näslund, Christina Lindberg, Sven-Ingvars and has as well produced the Eldkvarn album Limbo.

== Personal life ==
Peter LeMarc has two children and resides with his wife in Stockholm.

It was announced that he would perform his last concert at the Stockholm Music & Arts festival in August 2014.

== Discography ==
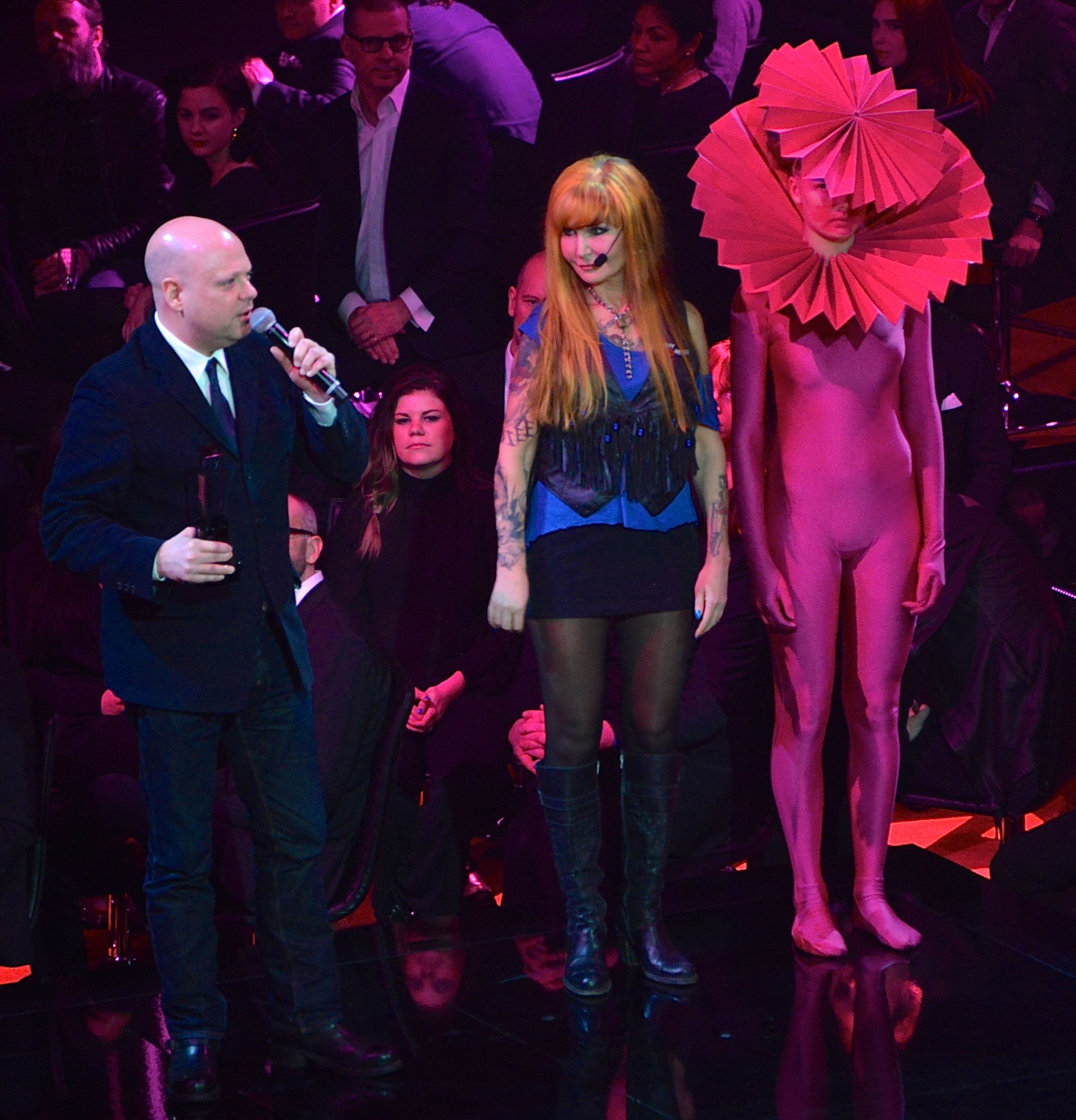
Peter LeMarc receives a Grammis award for Best Vocalist of the Year on 20 February 2013 at Cirkus, Stockholm

=== Albums ===
Year	Album	Chart peak (SWE)	Certification
1982	Buick	<50	
1983	Circus Circus	<50	
1984	Efter Tusen Timmar	<50	
1986	Marmor	<50	
1987	Peter LeMarc	6	
1988	Närmare gränsen	2	
1990	Välkommen hem	5	
1991	Sången dom spelar när filmen är slut	6	
1992	Det finns inget bättre	4	
1995	Bok med blanka sidor	1	
1997	Nio broars väg	5	
2003	Det som håller oss vid liv	1	
2005	Sjutton sånger - LeMarc sjunger LeMarc	1	
2007	Kärlek i tystnadens tid	3	
2012	Svag doft av skymning	1	
2016	Den tunna tråden	2	

Live albums

Year	Album	Chart peak (SWE)	Certification
1993	Buona Sera!	12	
2008	LeMarc Live!	6	

Compilation albums

Year	Album	Chart peak (SWE)	Certification
1992	Hittegods, fångade sånger & stulna ögonblick 1986-1992	23	
1992	Mannen i mitten	–	
1995	Hittegods 1986-1992	47	
1996	Lemarxism 1986-1996	9	
1996	Lemarcologi 1986-1996	2	
2009	Klassiker	4	
2010	Starkare än ord, samtliga album 1987-2008	22	

=== Singles ===
Year	Single	Chart peak (SWE)	Certification	Album
1987	"Håll om mig"	11		
1990	"Mellan dej och mej"	20		
1991	"Little Willie John"	37		
1991	"Sången dom spelar när filmen är slut"	27		
1996	"Starkare än ord"	38		
2003	"Det som håller oss vid liv"	3		
2004	"Så långt mina armar räcker"	18		
2005	"Älskad från första stund"	14		
2005	"Marias kyrka"	60		
2007	"Så gott att må gott igen"	50		
