= Eah Jé =

South African-born Swedish singer

- Born: Johannesburg, South Africa
- Genres: Pop; rock
- Occupation: Singer

Eah Jé is a South African-born Swedish singer. He won a Grammis Award in the category Newcomer of the Year for the album En liten låtidé.
