= The Latin Kings (group) =

Swedish hip hop group

- Also known as: TLK; Los Reyes Latinos
- Origin: Stockholm, Sweden
- Genres: Swedish hip hop
- Years active: 1993-2005, 2019
- Members: Dogge Doggelito; Salla Salazar; Chepe Salazar
- Past members: Rodrigo Pencheff; Daddy Boastin

The Latin Kings (TLK) was a Swedish hip hop group from the municipality of Botkyrka in the southern suburbs of Stockholm, Sweden. Their 1994 debut album, Välkommen till förorten (transl. Welcome to the suburbs), was promoted as "authentic Swedish rap" and incorporated local street slang, representing everyday life for youth living in Stockholm's immigrant suburbs. Their subsequent four albums incorporated themes and traditions from American West Coast hip hop.

== Background ==
The members of the group are the rapper and frontman Dogge Doggelito (Douglas Léon) and the two brothers, DJs and record producers, Salla (Christian Salazar Campos) and Chepe (Hugo Salazar Campos). They all have roots in Latin America (Venezuela and Chile), which is why they took their name from the gang Latin Kings.

They grew up in the concrete suburbs in Botkyrka where a large proportion of the population are immigrants and refugees and the poverty is more visible than elsewhere in Sweden. The hip hop subculture has a large following in these areas of Stockholm. Their songs reflect life in the less affluent suburbs.

Before The Latin Kings’ first release, a lesser-known account describes how the group met Swedish musician Stefan Wendin at an event in Solnahallen, where they performed on the same bill as Infinite Mass. , Wendin later wrote music and beats for several of the group’s earliest songs using an Akai S950 sampler. The story was later revisited in episode 70 of the podcast Sista Måltiden, “Första blatten på månen”, featuring Douglas “Dogge” León, published on 22 January 2022, when [./Https://sv.wikipedia.org/wiki/Ashkan_Fardost Ashkan Fardost] called both Wendin and Dogge and the two spoke for the first time in around 30 years.

== Recordings ==
TLK were, in 1994, among the first to release a hip hop album with lyrics in Swedish (the first was Just D). Swedish rappers had before that time almost always used English. The debut album was Välkommen till förorten (Welcome to the Suburb) and the very first single was "Snubben" (The Dude). The group felt like they had been ripped off by their record company and decided to start their own label, Red Line Records, on which they have signed a number of hip hop artists in Sweden such as Fattaru, Kalle Kath, Fjärde Världen and Ison & Fille.

If their contemporaries Infinite Mass were influenced by the West Coast sound, TLK has more of an East Coast flavor. The Latin Kings has become famous for rapping in the local Rinkeby Swedish, a "multiethnolect language" that is used in areas with many immigrants. This is a phonetically distinct form of Swedish, with loanwords from Turkish, Aramaic, Spanish, Finnish, Persian, Arabic and other languages.

Tracks by The Latin Kings, including "Snubben" and "Kompisar från förr", were included in Äkta! Svenska Hiphop-Hits 90-00 (transl. Authentic! Swedish Hiphop-Hits 90–00), released by Warner Music Sweden in 2000.

== Discography ==
=== Albums and singles ===
- Välkommen till förorten (Gold: 50,000 sold) (1994)
  - "Snubben"
  - "Kompisar från förr"
  - "Mecka"
  - "Fint väder"
  - "Halva inne"
- Bienvenido a mi barrio (1995) Spanish version of Välkommen till förorten
  - "Latino somos"
- I skuggan av betongen (Platinum: 102,000 sold) (1997)
  - "Botkyrka Stylee"
  - "Borta i tankar"
- Mitt kvarter (Gold: 83,000 sold) (2000)
  - "De e knas"
  - "Blend dom"
  - "Ainaziz"
- Omertà (2003)

=== Collections ===
- Familia Royal (2005)

== See also ==
- Swedish hip hop
