= Svag doft av skymning =

Studio album by Peter LeMarc
- Released: 2012
- Recorded: Decibel Studios
- Genre: Pop-rock
- Length: circa 41 minutes
- Label: Sony Music Entertainment
- Producer: Per Lindholm, Ronny Lahti

Peter LeMarc chronology
Klassiker (2009)	Svag doft av skymning (2012)

Svag doft av skymning is a 2012 studio album by Peter LeMarc.

== Track listing ==
1. Svag doft av skymning
2. Memphis i himlen
3. Bästa stunden på dan
4. Gråta som en karl
5. Våra bästa dar
6. Min kyrka
7. En sång som ingen radio spelar
8. På mitt hjärtas torg
9. Har någon sett till Douglas?
10. Regn mot ett rostigt tak
11. Den nakna sanningen

== Contributors ==
- Peter LeMarc - singer, composer, song lyrics, producer
- Jerker Odelholm - bass
- Andreas Dahlbäck - drums, percussion
- Stephan Forkelid - piano, electric piano
- Ola Gustafsson - guitar, pedal steel
- David Nyström - Hammond organ
- Bebe Risenfors - glockenspiel, saxophone, cornet, alto horn, bass tuba, clarinet, harmonica, omnichord
- Per Lindholm - producer
- Ronny Lahti - producer

== Charts ==
Chart (2012–2013)	Peak position
Sweden	1
