= Välkommen till förorten =

Studio album by The Latin Kings
- Released: 10 May 1994
- Recorded: 1994 at Soundtrade Studios
- Genre: Swedish hip hop
- Length: 67:13
- Label: Warner Music Sweden
- Producer: Gordon Cyrus; TLK

The Latin Kings chronology
Välkommen till förorten (1994)	Bienvenido a mi barrio (1995)

Välkommen till förorten (Welcome to the suburbs) is the debut album by Swedish hip hop group The Latin Kings. It proved to be very successful in Sweden and influenced many future Swedish hip hop acts. Välkommen till förorten stayed at the Swedish Top 60 chart for 20 weeks and peaked at the 9th spot. The album also spawned the charting singles "Snubben", "De e dej jag vill ha" and "Kompisar från förr". The Latin Kings re-released the album in Spanish as Bienvenido a mi barrio in 1995 under the name Los Reyes Latinos.

== Track listing ==
No.	Title	Length
1.	"Intro" (featuring DJ Tony)	2:07
2.	"Kompisar från förr" (featuring Daddy Boastin and Leslie Coard)	6:07
3.	"Mecka" (featuring Leaf Nuts and Desmond Foster)	4:14
4.	"De e slut"	0:22
5.	"De e dej ja vill ha"	4:21
6.	"Grisen"	0:06
7.	"Kriminell idit"	4:11
8.	"Salsakungen" (featuring René Martinez)	3:53
9.	"30 sekunder"	0:49
10.	"Halva inne" (featuring Godde)	6:38
11.	"Inte samma lika"	0:29
12.	"Snubben" (featuring Daddy Boastin)	5:34
13.	"Fint väder"	3:22
14.	"Chilly White 'Beatdown'"	0:18
15.	"Don Corleone" (featuring Jan Ekdal)	0:38
16.	"Vem e maffia"	3:20
17.	"Gussen" (featuring Desmond Foster)	2:56
18.	"Välkommen till förorten"	4:28
19.	"Krossa rasismen"	3:49
20.	"Grisen (Transform)"	0:06
21.	"Idiot Idiiter"	5:51
22.	"Jag tar sönder dej" (featuring George Bravo)	3:34
Total length:		67:13

== Reception ==
Professional ratings
Review scores
Source	Rating
DagensSkiva	9/10 stars

Välkommen till förorten was very well received among Swedish critics and is now considered a classic Swedish hip hop album. The Latin Kings were praised for their lyrics about the Swedish society from a suburban view, both by the general public and politicians. Patrik Ekelöf of the website Dagens Skiva called the album "a milestone in Swedish music history" and "a tough and heavy dub-influenced record that described the suburban life in a way we never had heard before".

== Charts ==
Album

Year	Chart	Position
1994	Swedish Top 60 Albums Chart	9

Singles

Year	Title	Position	Chart
1993	"Snubben"	38	Swedish Top 60 Singles Chart
1994	"Kompisar från förr"	25	Swedish Top 60 Singles Chart
1994	"De dej jag vill ha"	31	Swedish Top 60 Singles Chart
