= Leaving on a Mayday =

Studio album by Anna Ternheim
- Released: 12 November 2008
- Genre: Indie, folk
- Length: 47:27
- Label: Verve Forecast
- Producer: Björn Yttling

Anna Ternheim chronology
Halfway to Fivepoints (2008)	Leaving on a Mayday (2008)	The Night Visitor (2011)

Professional ratings
Review scores
Source	Rating
Allmusic	link
Pitchfork Media	link

Leaving on a Mayday is an album by singer-songwriter Anna Ternheim. It was released on 11 August 2008 and is Ternheim's fourth full-length LP.

== Track listing ==
1. "What Have I Done" – 3:21
2. "Damaged Ones" – 3:09
3. "Terrified" – 4:42
4. "Let It Rain" – 4:54
5. "My Heart Still Beats for You" – 4:27
6. "No, I Don't Remember" – 3:53
7. "Make It On My Own" – 3:24
8. "Summer Rain" – 3:55
9. "Losing You" – 3:38
10. "Off the Road" – 3:54
11. "Black Sunday Afternoon" – 4:37
12. "Terrified" – 3:33

Delux Edition

- CD1
1. What Have I Done
2. Damaged Ones
3. Terrified
4. Let It Rain
5. My Heart Still Beats For You
6. No I Don't Remember
7. Summer Rain
8. Losing You
9. Off The Road
10. Black Sunday Afternoon
- CD2: "Anna Sings Sinatra"
1. New York New York
2. Come Fly With Me
3. Fly Me To The Moon
4. That's Life
5. Strangers In The Night

Box edition

- CD1
1. What Have I Done
2. Damaged Ones
3. Terrified
4. Let It Rain
5. My Heart Still Beats For You
6. No I Don't Remember
7. Summer Rain
8. Losing You
9. Off The Road
10. Black Sunday Afternoon
11. New York New York
12. Come Fly With Me
13. Fly Me To The Moon
14. That's Life
15. Strangers In The Night
- CD2: LIVE EP FROM TOURING 2009
1. No, I Don't Remember
2. Damaged Ones
3. A French Love
4. Wedding Song
5. Let It Rain
- DVD: ANNA PERFORMS FIVE ACOUSTIC VERSIONS
1. What Have I Done
2. Summer Rain
3. No, I Don't Remember
4. Off The Road
5. My Heart Still Beats For You
