= Anna Ternheim =

Swedish singer-songwriter (born 1978)

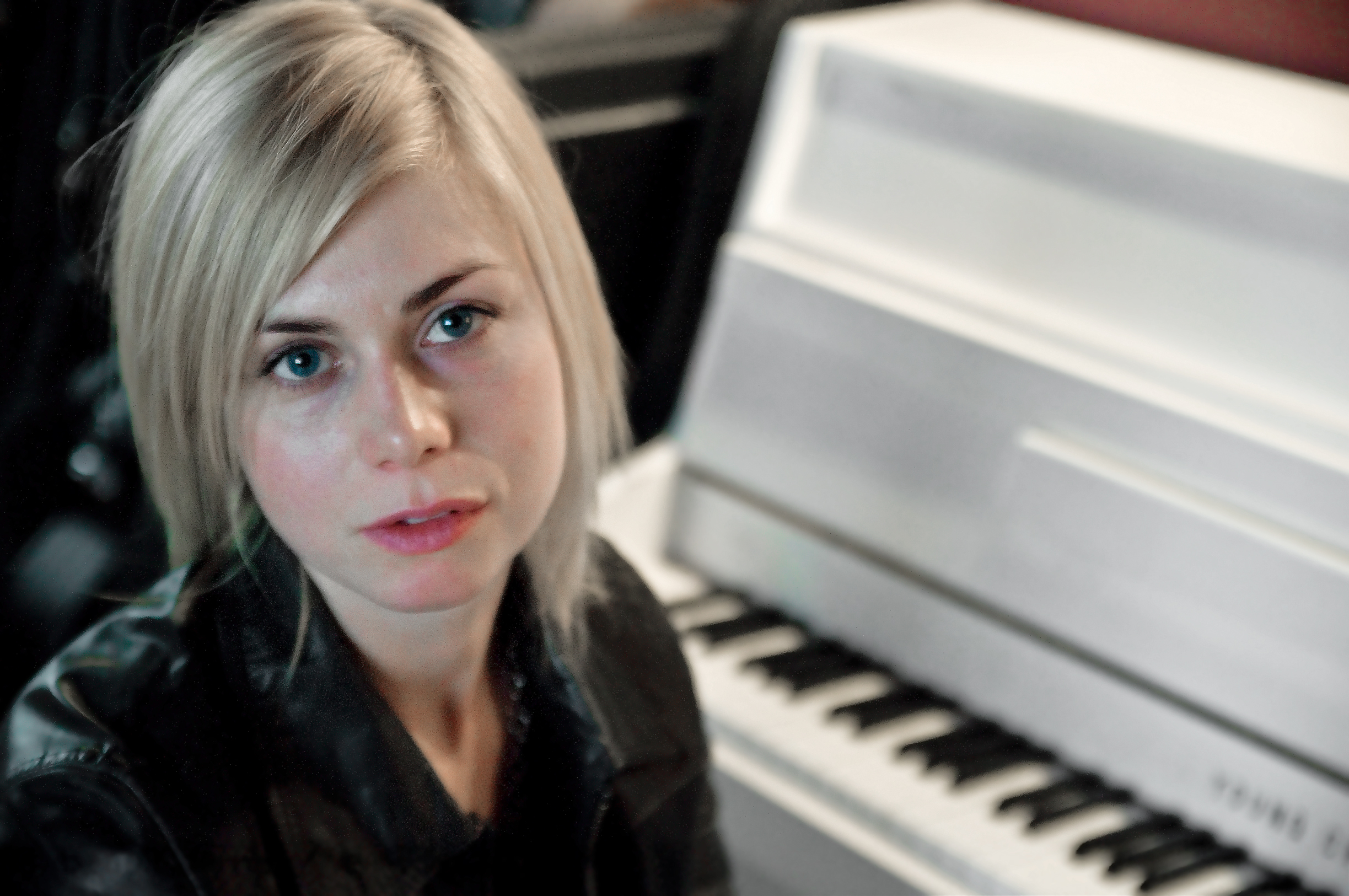
- Anna Ternheim in 2009

Background information
- Born: Anna Alexandra Ternheim; 31 May 1978 (age 47); Stockholm, Sweden
- Genres: Anti-folk, Alternative, Indie rock, Acoustic, Blues, Country
- Occupation: Singer-songwriter
- Instruments: Vocals, guitar, piano
- Years active: 2003–present
- Labels: Universal Music
- Website: www.annaternheim.com

Anna Ternheim (born 31 May 1978) is a Swedish singer-songwriter.

== Early life ==
Ternheim was born 31 May 1978 in Stockholm, Sweden. When she was 10 years old she began playing the guitar, writing songs and performing. During a year abroad in Atlanta, Georgia, Anna created her first band "Sova", playing at smaller festivals and local clubs. Back in Stockholm she continued her song writing and later in Lausanne, Switzerland, where she was performing while studying French.

== Career ==
She released her debut album Somebody Outside in 2004. The Swedish Grammy jury awarded her the Best Newcomer of the Year award, and she was nominated for Best Female Artist, Best Lyricist and Best Songwriter in 2005. She also won the P3 Gold award for Best Newcomer 2004.

For her second album, Separation Road released on 27 September 2006, she was awarded Best Female Artist and Best Lyricist by the Swedish Grammy jury. Again she was nominated for Best Songwriter and Best Album. She received the award for Best Female Artist at the Swedish National Radio's P3 Gold Awards the same year.

Her debut US album, Halfway to Fivepoints, was released on 22 April 2008.

In 2008, Ternheim moved to Manhattan, where she has lived ever since.

Her fourth album, Leaving on a Mayday, was released on 11 August 2008. The album won Album of the Year at the 2009 Swedish Grammy Awards along with the award for Best Female Artist.

The Night Visitor, Ternheim's fifth studio album, was released in autumn 2011 in both the United States and international territories.

After a series of performances and a brief break from touring, Ternheim announced on her blog in April 2015 recording sessions for a new album or EP, based from the Figure 8 Recording studio in Brooklyn, New York.

== Discography ==
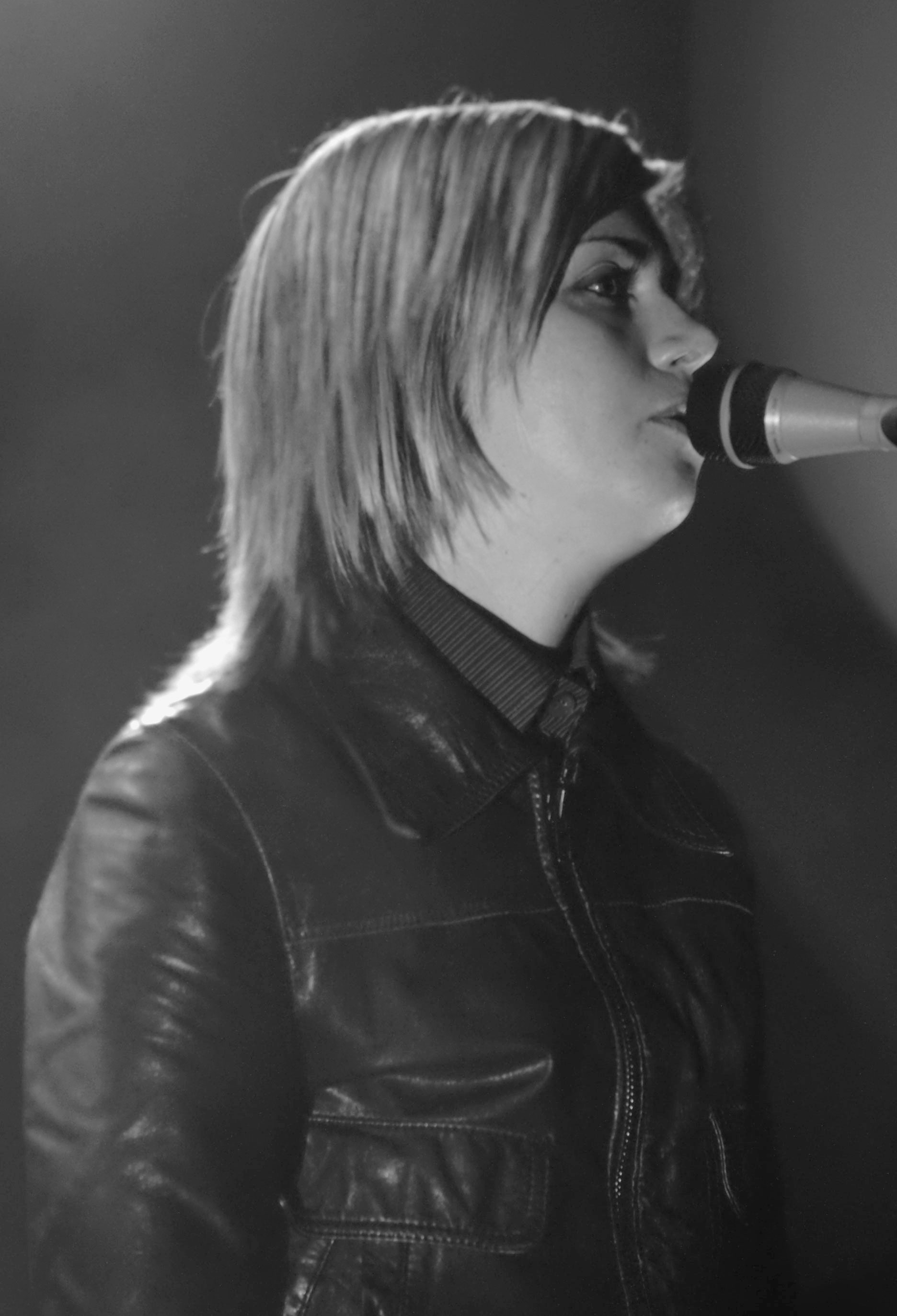
Ternheim in 2009

Her most popular songs include: "To Be Gone", "My Secret", "Girl Laying Down", "Today is A Good Day", and "Shoreline" (a Broder Daniel cover).

=== Albums ===
- 2004 – Somebody Outside
- 2006 – Separation Road
- 2008 – Halfway to Fivepoints (US only)
- 2008 – Leaving on a Mayday
- 2011 – The Night Visitor
- 2015 – For the Young (LP, 10 songs)
- 2016 – For the Young (CD with 12 songs)
- 2017 – All the Way to Rio
- 2019 – A Space for Lost Time
- 2025 – Psalmer från sjunde himlen

=== Live albums ===
- 2016 – Live in Stockholm
- 2018 – The Winter Tapes

=== EPs ===
- 1996 – Sova
- 2003 – Anna Ternheim – demo
- 2004 – I'll Follow You Tonight
- 2004 – To Be Gone
- 2005 – My Secret
- 2005 – Shoreline
- 2006 – Girl Laying Down
- 2007 – Lovers Dream & More Music for Psychotic Lovers
- 2007 – Anna Ternheim
- 2008 – Halfway to Fivepoints (US only)
- 2012 – Anna & Ferg (with David Ferguson)
- 2023 – Before the Dawn

=== Singles ===
- 2004 – "To Be Gone"
- 2005 – "My Secret"
- 2005 – "Shoreline"
- 2006 – "Girl Laying Down"
- 2007 – "Today Is a Good Day"
- 2008 – "What Have I Done"
- 2009 – "Escape Into My Arms"
- 2009 – "No, I don't Remember"
- 2009 – "Make It On My Own"
- 2012 – "Walking Aimlessly"
- 2012 – "Lorelie-Marie"
- 2013 – "Shoreline (Horns & Saw Version)"
- 2013 – "Light of Day"
- 2015 – "Every Heartbeat"
- 2015 – "Still A Beautiful Day"
- 2015 – "For The Young"
- 2015 – "Caroline"
- 2016 – "Kärleken Väntar"
- 2017 – "Minns Det Som Igår"

=== Guest appearances ===
- 2007 – Leave a Light on Voices of Eden by Fläskkvartetten
- 2007 – Reflexion 07 on Reflexion 07 by Petter
- 2009 – Du Och Jag and Christmas on The Dark Flower (Den Mörka Blomman) by Freddie Wadling
- 2010 – Spår on Spår by Tomas Andersson Wij
- 2012 – Quiet Night on Wallander – The Music by Fleshquartet
- 2013 – Seventeen (Alternative Version) on Seventeen by Johnossi
- 2014 – Lovers Never Say Goodbye on The Time Has Come by Weeping Willows
- 2015 – Far From Any Road on Ghost Rider by Jerry Williams

=== Songs in popular culture ===
In 2010, her song "My Heart Still Beats for You" featured on season 7 of The CW's One Tree Hill. Her song "What Have I Done" was featured on the popular drama series "Grey's Anatomy".

The Ternheim song "Quiet Night" was used in the second series of the Swedish version of Wallander starring Krister Henriksson. On 18 December 2009, her song "No, I Don't Remember" was featured on an episode of Dollhouse entitled "The Attic". This song was featured in July 2010 on a new DLC episode, for the Xbox 360 videogame Alan Wake, entitled "The Signal". The songs "Off the Road" and "Words of Love" also featured in the videogame Silent Hill: Downpour.
