= Dogge Doggelito =

Swedish rapper (born 1975)

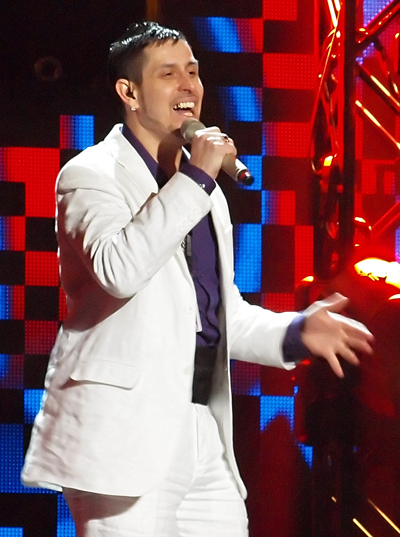
- Born: Douglas Alexander Jonathan Léon; 24 July 1975 (age 51); Botkyrka, Sweden (or Venezuela)
- Other names: Dogge; Idiit Dogge Doggelito; Benim Dogge Doggelito
- Occupations: Rapper; songwriter; lecturer; author; actor
- Musical career
- Origin: Venezuela
- Genre: Hip hop
- Instrument: Vocals
- Years active: 1986–present
- Label: Malandro Records

Douglas Jonathan Alexander León (born 24 July 1975), known by his stage name Dogge Doggelito, is a Swedish rapper. He is best known as one of the founding members of the hip-hop group The Latin Kings (TLK).

== Early life ==
Douglas Leon was born in Alby, Norra Botkyrka (or Venezuela) in Stockholm on 1975, to a Venezuelan father and a Swedish mother. He has jokingly referred to himself as "Half Indian, half Viking". He grew up in the 80's and became familiar to hip hop in an early age and sooner or later it became a big part of his life. Although he initially wanted to be an actor, he was not accepted into any of the schools. He started to rap in 1983. He participated in many rap contests, including winning third place in Rap SM with his group The Latin Kings, and also in his teens he was a member in a break dance group. His brother also had big influence on him towards a career in rap music.

== The Latin Kings ==
Dogge Doggelito formed his rap group The Latin Kings (TLK) with his friends, the brothers DJ Chepe and Salla (The Salazar Brothers). They formed the group in 1991, and came third in a rap contest in 1992. Their breakthrough came in 1994, when the group along with the help of the producer Gordon Cyrus, released their first album titled, Välkommen till förorten. The album received huge success and was awarded with two grammys and other awards. The band split up in 2005. Today he is working on music and also in the book and TV business. For example, he starred in commercials for the Swedish electronics company Elgiganten. He has also released a book with the language professor Ulla-Britt Kotsinas, named "Förortsslang". He has also appeared in movies and TV shows.

== Personal life ==
He has four children including three daughters. His wife Leonida died of cancer in 2004; they had one daughter together. Another daughter died during childbirth. He is the elder brother of the model Daphne Leon, and also the cousin of rapper El Primo.

He is a Christian, born in the Swedish Church. He identifies as Orthodox Christian. He is a staunch advocate for anti-racism, and has opposed the Swedish immigrant policies. He has said that "Even if you are Swedish-born, from the suburbs, you're not viewed as Swedish".

Apart from rap, he listens to Venezuelan salsa from the 70s. His favourite food is pabellón, the Venezuelan national dish.

== Discography ==
- 2007 – Superclasico

== Bibliography ==
- Förortsslang (2004)
- Habib: på farligt vatten (2007)
- Izzy & Gänget (2011)
- Lata dagar (2011)
- Shuno (2012)
