= Stiftelsen (band) =

Swedish pop rock band

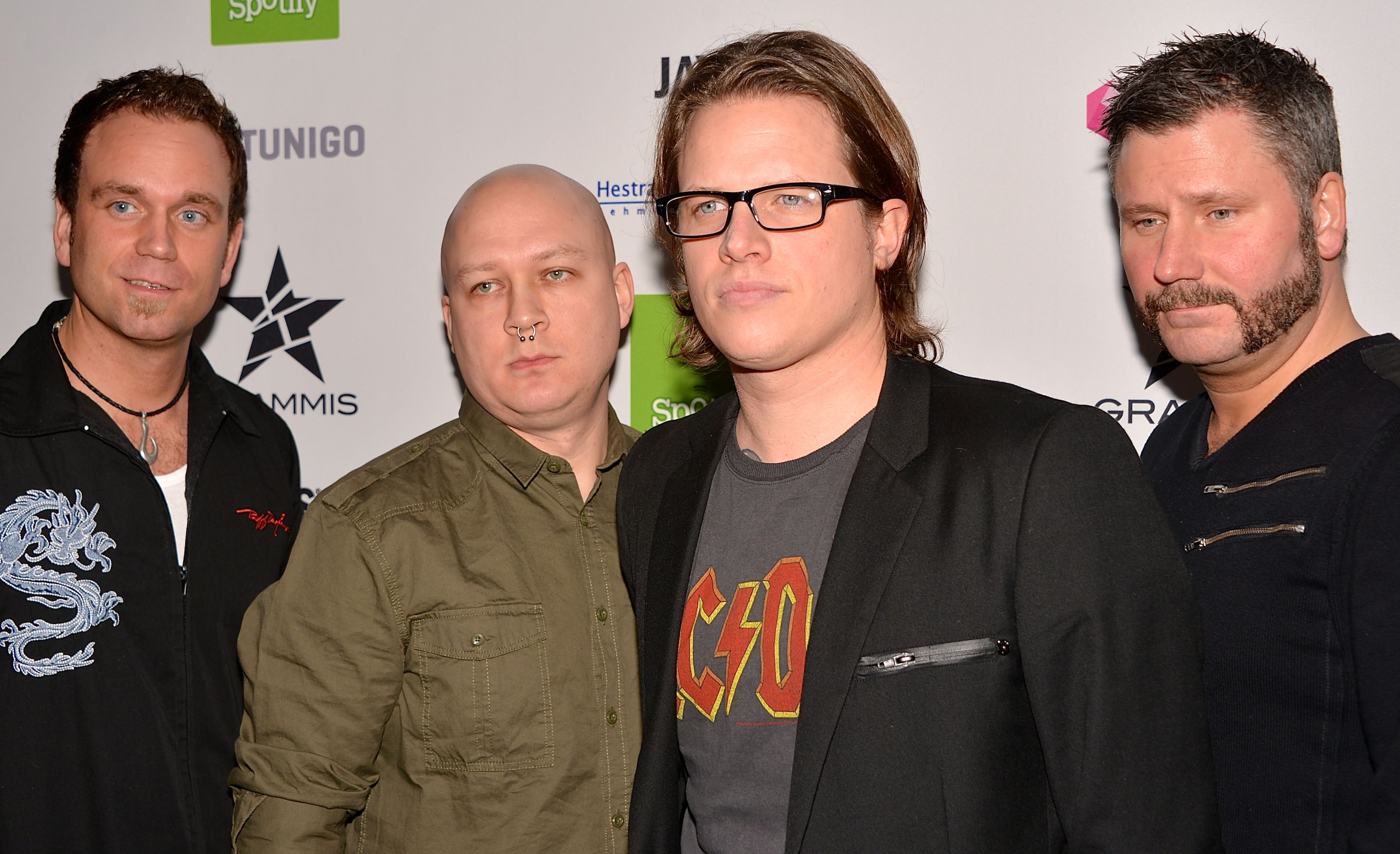
- Stiftelsen in 2013

Background information
- Origin: Sweden
- Genres: Pop rock
- Years active: 2010–2024
- Label: Universal Music Sweden
- Members: Robert Pettersson; Micke Eriksson; Arne Johansson; Martin Källström

Stiftelsen, meaning "the Foundation", is a Swedish pop rock band that features the vocals of Robert Pettersson, the lead singer of the Swedish pop-rock band Takida. Pettersson wanted to do projects different from the staple of Takida music. That's when he met Micke Eriksson, Arne Johansson and Martin Källström and they formed Stiftelsen in the summer of 2010. The band is signed to Universal Music Sweden and has a variety of musical influences from dansband and country. They had a hit in Sweden with their single "Vart jag än går" (meaning Wherever I go), released on 30 May 2012.

== Members ==
- Robert Pettersson (vocals) - lead singer of Takida
- Micke Eriksson (guitar) - formerly member of Swedish band Willy & The Hitchhikers
- Arne Johansson (bass) - also from Willy & The Hitchhikers
- Martin Källström (drums) - formerly from Swedish metal band Corroded

== Discography ==
=== Albums ===
Year	Album	Peak Position	Certification
Year	Album	SWE	Certification
2012	Ljungaverk	2	
2013	Dopet	1	
2015	Kom som du är	2	
2017	Allting låter som Slipknot	1	
2020	Moder jord	5	
2022	En vampyr har alltid fest	54	

=== Singles ===
Year	Single	Peak position	Certification	Album
Year	Single	SWE	Certification	Album
2012	"Vart jag än går"	1	7× Platinum	Ljungaverk
2012	"Härifrån"	30		Ljungaverk
2012	"Ur balans"	21		Ljungaverk
2012	"Vildhjärta"	46		Ljungaverk
2012	"Du är ju allting"	57		Ljungaverk
2012	"Nu får du gå hem..."	55		Ljungaverk
2013	"En annan värld"	17		Dopet
2013	"Utanför din dörr"	—		Dopet
2016	"Darling"	92		—N/a
2018	"När kallt möter kallt"	83		—N/a
2018	"Vi gör det igen"	77		—N/a
2019	"Sov med änglarna"	— (Note: "Sov med änglarna" did not enter the Swedish Singellista Chart, but peaked at number nine on the Swedish Heatseeker Chart.)		—N/a
2019	"Håll om mej!" (Recorded at Spotify Studios, Stockholm)	— (Note: "Håll om mej!" did not enter the Swedish Singellista Chart, but peaked at number nine on the Swedish Heatseeker Chart.)		Spotify Singles
2020	"Kropp utan ande"	— (Note: While "Kropp utan ande" did not enter the Swedish Singles Chart, it peaked at number 18 on the Swedish Heatseeker Chart.)		TBA
