= Oscar Danielson (singer) =

Swedish pop folk indie singer-songwriter

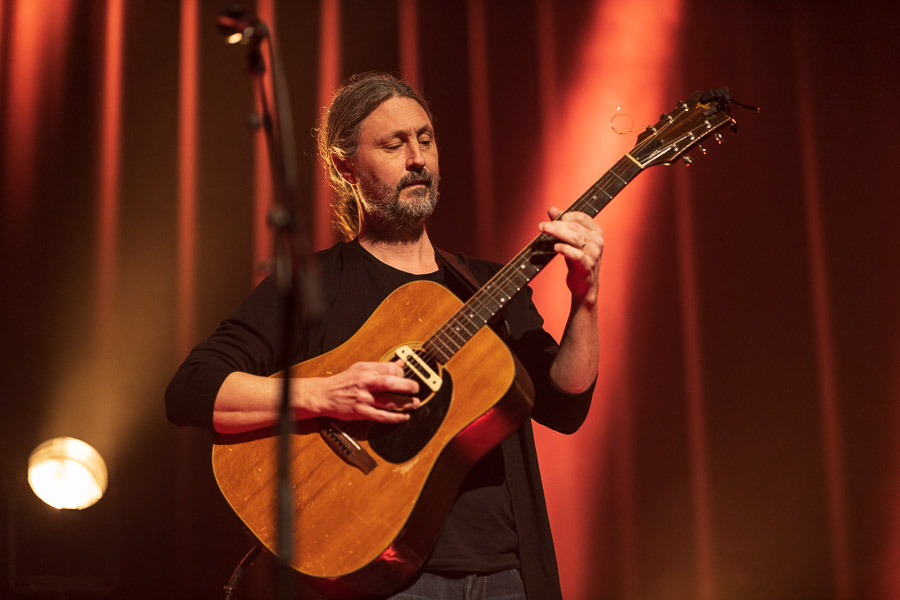

Oscar Danielson is a Swedish pop folk indie singer-songwriter who released his first CD independently in 1996 called Schysst & Populär. He worked with Slutsåld label. He has gained fame through a number of melodious songs. He released his 2012 album Fina år 1996-2012 in October 2012, a compilation of many of his songs.

Danielson has also authored three books.

== Discography ==
Studio albums

Year	Album	Chart peak (SWE)	Certification	Notes
2012	Fina år 1996-2012	15		Compilation album

CDs

- 1996: Schysst & Populär
- 1998: Gitarren är mitt svärd
- 2004: Att vara vacker är modernt igen
- 2005: Sårskorpor (Album and Teatermusik)
- 2007: En bild av lycka att spara på
- 2011: Stockholm i mitt hjärta
- 2011: Det kostar på att vara barn

EPs

- 2003: Det kan vara ett problem, för mig, ibland det där

Singles

- 1996: "Schysst & populär"
- 1996: "Time out"
- 1998: "Barbro och Gunnar"
- 1998: "Hallands floder"
- 1999: "Årets märkligaste dag"
- 1999: "Årets märkligaste dag" (Promo)
- 2004: "Du roar mig" (Promo)
- 2004: "Kudden"

== Books ==
- 2002: Siljans konditori
- 2006: Johannas Backe
- 2008: Dagmar
