= Martinez (band) =

- Origin: Alnön, Sweden
- Genres: Dansband music
- Years active: 1976-

Martinez is a Swedish dansband that was formed in Alnön, near Sundsvall in 1976 as Triggs. In 1978, the name was changed Santos, and eventually in 1980 to Martinez. The band has scored chart successes in Sweden. Many lead vocals have been with the band including Maribel Martinez, the band's first singer in whose name the band is named, Agneta Olsson, Louella "Lillan" Vestman and Claudia Unda. From 2008, Louella "Lillan" Vestman returned as lead singer. From 2012, Sandra Estberg is the band's lead.

== Discography ==
=== Albums ===
- 1999: Mer än en vän
- 2001: En dans i morgonsolen
- 2006: Söndag 06.55
- 2008: Collage (compilation album)
- 2010: Ingenting är bättre
- 2013: Fram och tillbaka (peaked in SWE: #16)
- 2014: Tillsammans (peaked in SWE: #29)
- 2015: Fredagskväll (peaked in SWE: #23)
