= This Is Who I Am (Salem Al Fakir album) =

Studio album by Salem Al Fakir
- Released: January 2007
- Genre: Melodic pop
- Length: 49:11
- Label: Virgin

Salem Al Fakir chronology
This Is Who I Am (2007)	Astronaut (2009)

This Is Who I Am is the debut studio album by Salem Al Fakir, released in January 2007.

== Track listing ==
1. "Begin" - 0:56
2. "This Is Who I Am" - 3:28
3. "Tell Me" - 2:52
4. "Two Long Distance to Greatest Thoughts" - 2:33
5. "Dream Girl" - 4:27
6. "It's Only You" - 3:13
7. "Jussi" - 1:00
8. "Devil Look" - 4:47
9. "Count Me Out" -3:23
10. "It's True" - 3:24
11. "Magic Night" - 3:11
12. "Baroon" - 00:52
13. "Hymn" - 2:24
14. "Damien & Bob" - 1:36
15. "Good Song" -4:14
16. "Thank You" - 3:19
17. "End" - 3:32

== Charts ==
Chart (2007)	Peak position
Swedish Albums (Sverigetopplistan)	1
