= Frida Hyvönen =

Swedish singer-songwriter (born 1977)

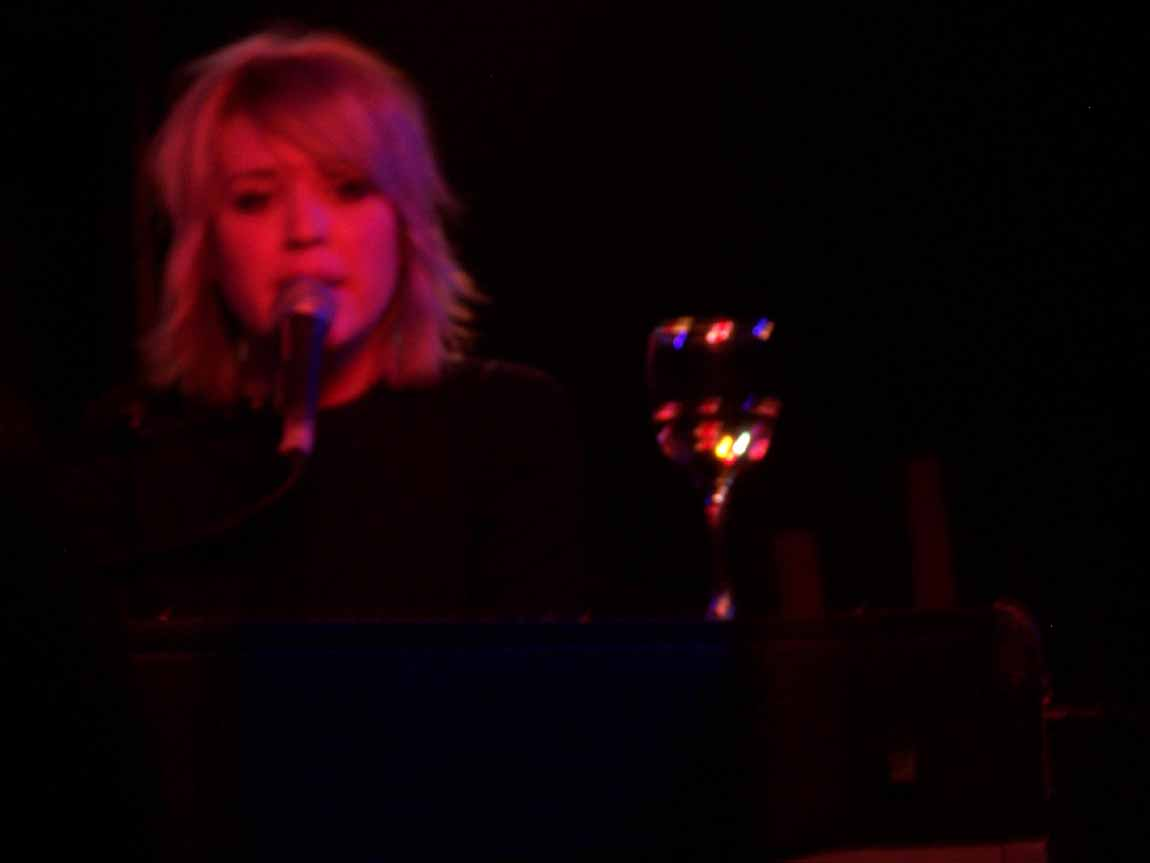
- Hyvönen in 2006

Background information
- Born: Anna Frida Amanda Hyvönen; 30 December 1977 (age 48)
- Origin: Robertsfors, Sweden
- Genres: Singer-songwriter, indie
- Instruments: Vocals, piano, keyboards
- Years active: 2004–present
- Labels: Licking Fingers, Secretly Canadian, RMV Grammofon
- Website: fridahyvonen.com

Anna Frida Amanda Hyvönen (born 30 December 1977) is a Swedish singer-songwriter.

== Personal life ==
Hyvönen grew up in Robertsfors, located outside Umeå in the north of Sweden (which is also the hometown of her cousin Josephine Forsman's band Sahara Hotnights). Her Finnish grandfather was from Rovaniemi. She moved to Stockholm in 1995. Between 2010 and 2012, she resided in Paris. Today, she shares her time between Stockholm and her house in Västerbotten.

== Career ==
Hyvönen's first record, Until Death Comes, was recorded at Atlantis Studios in Stockholm and co-produced with Jari Haapalainen of The Bear Quartet. The record was released in the EU in 2005 on The Concretes record label Licking Fingers, in the United States in 2006 on Secretly Canadian and in Australia in 2007 on Chapter Music. Hyvönen received the 2005 Stockholmspriset ("The Stockholm Prize") by the Swedish publication Nöjesguiden for her debut album.

In the fall of 2005, Hyvönen wrote music for dance performance Pudel, by choreographer Dorte Olesen. She also performed the music live on stage at Dansens Hus in Stockholm. The music was recorded in 2006 and released in January 2007.

In spring 2006, she toured the United Kingdom with José González, and in summer 2006 she toured the US with fellow Swedish artist Jens Lekman.

Hyvönen's next album, "Silence is Wild", was released on 29 October 2008 in Scandinavia and 4 November 2008 in North America and Australia. Once again, Jari Haapalainen co-produced with Hyvönen. The album was critically acclaimed, and resulted in Hyvönen winning "Kulturpriset" ("The Culture Prize") in 2009, given by Swedish newspaper Dagens Nyheter.

The same year, she was the first Swedish pop artist invited to play a show at the Royal Dramatic Theatre in Stockholm, and she completed a collaboration with photographer Elin Berge, "Drottninglandet". The project consisted of a book of photos by Berge, with an accompanying CD of instrumental music composed and performed by Hyvönen. The book followed women from Thailand, living in the north of Sweden.

In 2012 Hyvönen - for the third time together with Haapalainen - recorded the Album "To the Soul" in Benny Andersson's new studio Riksmixningsverket at Skeppsholmen in Stockholm. The engineer was Linn Fijal.

Hyvönen recorded and released music for a second photo book with Elin Berge, "Kungariket" in 2015, this time turning their eye towards Swedish men in Thailand.

In 2016, Frida wrote her first album in Swedish, "Kvinnor och Barn", which was acclaimed by critics and won two Grammis Awards in the categories "Lyricist" and "Composer". The album was co-produced with Tobias Fröberg.

In 2017, she composed and arranged music for a theatre play, "ILYA", by director Lars Rudolfsson, at the Stockholm City Theatre.

The same year, she revisited the Royal Dramatic Theatre together with First Aid Kit, Annika Norlin, Loney, Dear, among others, to perform a tribute to Leonard Cohen. The show was broadcast on Swedish Television.

Hyvönen's most recent album, "Dream of Independence", was released in 2021 by RMV Grammofon. It was recorded at Riksmixningsverket with engineer Linn Fijal.

== Musical syle ==
Hyvönen's music is piano and vocal driven, with a main focus on the melody and lyrics, which are often reminiscent of short stories. She covers subjects like funerals, breastfeeding, fertility, modernity, art, war, eating disorders, travels, abusive relationships, the economics of love, becoming a parent, the creative process. Live, she performs solo with grand piano, or more often, as a trio, with two other musicians. Among the musicians that have played in Frida's band are Linnea Olsson, Tammy Karlsson, Sarah Frey, Daniel Bingert, Amanda Lindgren, Marlene Johansson-Erlandsson, Jari Haapalainen, Anna Bergvall and Anna Lund.

=== Cover songs ===
In autumn 2007, Hyvönen recorded a cover of the R.E.M. song "Everybody Hurts", released in digital form by Stereogum. She also covered the song "Sista dan tillsammans" together with Mattias Alkberg on Dubbel Trubbel, a tribute to Olle Adolphson. Her cover of Judee Sill's "Jesus Was a Cross Maker" was released in September 2009 by label American Dust as part of Crayon Angel: A Tribute to the Music of Judee Sill. In November 2010, she interpreted the poem "Neeijjj" on the compilation Sonja Åkesson tolkad av....

== Discography ==
=== Albums ===
Year	Information	Sweden
2005	Until Death Comes: First studio album; Released: 6 April 2005; Label: Licking Fingers; Format: CD, LP, digital download	20
2007	Frida Hyvönen Gives You: Music from the Dance Performance PUDEL: Second studio album; Released: 24 January 2007; Label: Licking Fingers; Format: CD, LP, digital download	27
2008	Silence Is Wild: Third studio album; Released: 29 October 2008; Label: Licking Fingers; Format: CD, LP, digital download	9
2009	Frida Hyvönen Gives You: Music from Drottninglandet: Fourth studio album; Released: March 2009; Publisher: Bokförlaget Atlas; Format: CD, book	27
2012	To the Soul: Fifth studio album; Released: April 2012; Publisher: NA; Format: CD, LP, digital download	4
2015	Frida Hyvönen Gives You: Music from Kungariket: Sixth studio album; Released: April 2015; Publisher: Natur & Kultur; Format: CD, book	
2016	Kvinnor och barn: Seventh studio album; Released: November 2016; Format: CD, LP, digital download	20
2021	Dream of Independence: Eight studio album; Release: March 2021; Publisher: RMV Grammofon; Format: CD, LP, digital	34

=== Singles ===
- 2005: "I Drive My Friend", Licking Fingers/Playground.
- 2008: "Traveling Companion" (Marit Bergman featuring Frida Hyvönen), Sugartoy Recordings.
- 2012: "Terribly Dark"

Part of compilations

- 2005: "Sista dan tillsammans" (in compilation Dubbeltrubbel), EMI.
- 2009: "Jesus was a crossmaker" (in compilation Crayon Angel: A Tribute to the Music of Judee Sill), American Dust.
- 2010: "Neeijjj", (in compilation Sonja Åkesson tolkad av...), Playground Music.
