= Kvinnor och barn =

Studio album by Frida Hyvönen
- Released: 25 November 2016
- Length: 46:36
- Label: RMV Grammofon

Frida Hyvönen chronology
To the Soul (2012)	Kvinnor och barn (2016)

Kvinnor och barn is the sixth album by Swedish singer Frida Hyvönen. It reached number 20 in the Swedish Album charts.

== Track listing ==
All tracks are written by Frida Hyvönen

No.	Title	Length
1.	"Sjön"	4:11
2.	"Imponera på mig"	3:27
3.	"Balkongmannen"	3:01
4.	"Förlorat dig"	2:44
5.	"Alla vet att det är vackert i Paris"	3:30
6.	"Vänner i vardagen"	3:44
7.	"Kommer du?"	3:33
8.	"Drömmen om dig"	3:23
9.	"Min stad"	4:22
10.	"Kvinnor och barn"	3:39
11.	"Fredag morgon"	7:06
12.	"Amors förkastliga pilar"	3:56
Total length:		46:36

== Personnel ==
Personnel adapted from album liner notes.

Musicians

- Frida Hyvönen – vocals, grand piano, keyboards, Mellotron, handclaps
- Amanda Lindgren – cornet, clarinet, drums, vocals, handclaps
- Tobias Fröberg – keyboards, vocals, handclaps
- Lasse Hyvönen – nyckelharpa (10)
- Ola Hultgren – drums (7)
- Linnea Olson – cello, vocals
- Mattias Björkas – vocals (2)

Production

- Friday Hyvönen – production, mixing
- Tobias Fröberg – production, mixing

== Charts ==
Chart (2016–2017)	Peak position
Swedish Albums (Sverigetopplistan)	20
