= Tyrannosaurus Hives =

Studio album by the Hives
- Released: 19 July 2004
- Recorded: 2003–2004
- Studio: Varispeed (Klågerup); Gröndahl (Stockholm)
- Genre: Garage rock revival; garage punk; post-punk revival
- Length: 29:58
- Label: Polydor; Interscope
- Producer: Pelle Gunnerfeldt; The Hives

The Hives chronology
Your New Favourite Band (2001)	Tyrannosaurus Hives (2004)	The Black and White Album (2007)

Singles from Tyrannosaurus Hives
- 1. "Walk Idiot Walk" Released: June 2004; 2. "Two-Timing Touch and Broken Bones" Released: October 2004; 3. "Abra Cadaver" Released: December 2004; 4. "A Little More for Little You" Released: October 2005

Professional ratings
Aggregate scores
Source	Rating
Metacritic	78/100
Review scores
Source	Rating
AllMusic	4.5/5 stars
Blender	4/5 stars
Entertainment Weekly	B−
The Guardian	3/5 stars
The Independent	4/5 stars
Los Angeles Times	3/4 stars
NME	8/10
Pitchfork	7.5/10
Rolling Stone	3.5/5 stars
Uncut	3/5 stars

Tyrannosaurus Hives is the third studio album by Swedish rock band the Hives, released on 19 July 2004 through Polydor Records internationally and Interscope Records in the United States. As of 2006 the album has sold 176,000 copies in United States.

== Track listing ==
All songs by Randy Fitzsimmons

Tyrannosaurus Hives track listing
No.	Title	Length
1.	"Abra Cadaver"	1:33
2.	"Two-Timing Touch and Broken Bones"	2:00
3.	"Walk Idiot Walk"	3:31
4.	"No Pun Intended"	2:20
5.	"A Little More for Little You"	2:58
6.	"B Is for Brutus"	2:36
7.	"See Through Head"	2:21
8.	"Diabolic Scheme"	3:00
9.	"Missing Link"	1:56
10.	"Love in Plaster"	3:11
11.	"Dead Quote Olympics"	1:59
12.	"Antidote"	2:30
Total length:		29:58

UK bonus track
No.	Title	Length
13.	"Uptight"	2:25
14.	"The Hives Meet the Norm"	2:06
Total length:		34:29

== Personnel ==
The Hives

- Howlin' Pelle Almqvist – lead vocals
- Nicholaus Arson – lead guitar, backing vocals
- Vigilante Carlstroem – rhythm guitar, backing vocals
- Dr. Matt Destruction – bass guitar
- Chris Dangerous – drums

Additional musicians

- Björn Yttling – string arrangement
- Andreas Forsman, Johan Moren, Rebecca Karlsson, Christoffer Öhman, Henrik Söderqvist – string performance

Technical

- Pelle Gunnerfeldt – producer, engineer, mixing
- The Hives – producer, mixing, artwork
- Johan Gustavsson – engineer
- Michael Ilbert – mixing
- George Marino – mastering
- Walse Custom Design – artwork
- Mikael Eriksson/Rithuset – cover illustration
- Stefan Zschernitz – photography

== Charts ==
Chart performance for Tyrannosaurus Hives
Chart (2004)	Peak position
Australian Albums (ARIA)	33
Austrian Albums (Ö3 Austria)	18
Belgian Albums (Ultratop Flanders)	88
Danish Albums (Hitlisten)	31
Dutch Albums (Album Top 100)	60
Finnish Albums (Suomen virallinen lista)	7
French Albums (SNEP)	39
German Albums (Offizielle Top 100)	10
Irish Albums (IRMA)	17
Norwegian Albums (VG-lista)	11
Swedish Albums (Sverigetopplistan)	1
Swiss Albums (Schweizer Hitparade)	32
UK Albums (OCC)	7
US Billboard 200	33

== Certifications ==
Certifications for Tyrannosaurus Hives
Region	Certification	Certified units/sales
Sweden (GLF)	Gold	30,000^{^}
United Kingdom (BPI)	Gold	100,000^{^}
^{^} Shipments figures based on certification alone.
