= Separation Road =

Studio album by Anna Ternheim
- Released: 27 September 2006
- Length: 35:47
- Label: Universal Music

Anna Ternheim chronology
Somebody Outside (2004)	Separation Road (2006)	Halfway to Fivepoints (2008)

Separation Road is Swedish singer-songwriter Anna Ternheim's second album, released on 27 September 2006. A limited edition bonus CD, entitled Naked Versions II, was released at the same time. The first single was "Girl Laying Down" (13 September 2006), followed by "Today is a Good Day" (4 December 2006), and "Lovers Dream" (2 April 2007).

== Track listing ==
#	Title	Length
1.	Intro	0:55
2.	Girl Laying Down	2:57
3.	Today is a Good Day	3:32
4.	Such a Lonely Soul	3:42
5.	Calling Love	4:11
6.	No Subtle Men	3:08
7.	Lovers Dream	3:59
8.	Feels Like Sand	3:41
9.	Tribute to Linn	3:09
10.	One to Blame	3:43
11.	Halfway to Fivepoints	2:50

== Track listing for Naked Versions II ==
#	Title	Length
1.	Intro	0:18
2.	Lovekeeper	2:56
3.	Girl Laying Down	3:05
4.	You Mean Nothing to Me Anymore	2:47
5.	The Loneliness is Gone	2:48
6.	Black Widow	2:36
7.	Lovers Dream	4:18
8.	Highlands	3:45
9.	Nights in Goodville	3:37
10.	Words of Love	3:16
11.	Such a Lonely Soul	3:46

== Charts ==
=== Weekly charts ===
Chart (2006)	Peak position
Swedish Albums (Sverigetopplistan)	1

=== Year-end charts ===
Chart (2006)	Position
Swedish Albums (Sverigetopplistan)	26
Chart (2007)	Position
Swedish Albums (Sverigetopplistan)	94
