= Candela (Swedish band) =

Swedish dansband

- Origin: Vejbystrand, Sweden
- Genres: Dansband music
- Years active: 1984-

Candela is a dansband from Vejbystrand in Sweden, established in 1984

== Members ==
Vocals

- 1984–1985 — Charlene Sheppard
- 1985–1986 — Marie Hansen
- 1986–1991 — Maivor Ohlsson
- 1991–1996 — Jenny Öhlund
- 1997 — Helena Eriksson
- 1996–2000 — Lena Göransson
- 2000–2004 — Lotta Nilsson
- 2005– Maria Knutsson

Guitar

- 1990–1995 — Antti Johansson
- 1995–1996 — Per-Ola Lindholm
- 1995–2000 — Jonas Sandquist
- 1996–2000 — Lena Göransson
- 2000–2005 — Mikael Dahlkvist
- 2005– — Martin Blad
- 2009– — Magnus Karlsson

Bass

- 1984–1985 — Billy Heil
- 1986–1988 — Jonas Sandquist
- 1989–1996, 2005 — Billy Heil
- 1997–1999 — Pelle Eldonson
- 1999–2003 — Jerker Brosson
- 2003–2005 — Göran Forsén
- 2005–2006 — Ola Strömberg

Keyboards

- 1989–2003 — John Ebbesson
- 2003–2004 Stamatios Karavas
- 2005–2006 — Tommy Jonsson
- 2006 — Lars Johansson

Saxophone

- 1990–1995 — Antti Johansson
- 1995–1996 — Per-Ola Lindholm
- 1996–2000 — Lena Göransson

Drums

- 1987–1988 — Martin Sandberg
- 1989–1991 — Frans Ebbesson
- 1992–1998 — Andy Johansson
- 1999–2005 — Martin Sandberg
- 2005 — Mats Bengtsson
- 2006–2009 — Jan-Erik Johansson
- 2009– — Magnus Fransson

== Discography ==
=== Albums ===
- 1994: Candelas blå
- 1995: Candelas vita
- 1996: Candela Collection
- 2002: Blå vind

== Svensktoppen songs ==
- 1994: "När du ser på mig"
- 1994: "Du finns i mina tankar"
- 1995: "Nätterna med dig"
- 1995: "Jag önskar mig"
- 1996: "Malmö-Köpenhamn"
- 2002: "Minnet av dig"
