= Martin Källström =

- Born: Martin Källström; 1975 (age 50–51); Sweden
- Education: Linköping University (MSc, Computer Science)
- Occupation: Technology entrepreneur

Martin Källström (born 1975) is a Swedish technology entrepreneur. He is the founder of Twingly, a blog search engine, and Narrative, a company known for developing the wearable camera Narrative clip.

== Early life and education ==
Källström was born in Sweden. He studied computer science at Linköping University, where he obtained a Master of Science degree.

== Career ==
After graduating, Källström worked as a programmer at Framfab, a Swedish e-consultancy firm. In 2000, he moved to Tokyo, where he worked as a freelance web and graphics designer.

In 2006, he founded Twingly and served as its chief executive officer until 2012. He later co-founded Memoto (later known as Narrative) with Oskar Kalmaru and Björn Wesen in Stockholm. The company developed the wearable camera Narrative clip, which was launched through a Kickstarter campaign that raised over $500,000, followed by venture funding from True Ventures.
