= Licking Fingers =

- Parent company: Independent
- Founded: Between 1997 and 1999
- Founder: The Concretes
- Distributor: Independent
- Genre: Indie pop, Indie rock
- Country of origin: Sweden
- Location: Stockholm, Sweden

Licking Fingers is a Swedish independent record label run by and affiliated with The Concretes, a Swedish indie-pop band. It was formed in Stockholm sometime between 1997 and 1999.

== Bands and artists ==
The Concretes, El Perro del Mar, and Frida Hyvönen have released music through this imprint.

== See also ==
- List of record labels
