= CajsaStina Åkerström =

Swedish singer-songwriter, artist and author (born 1967)

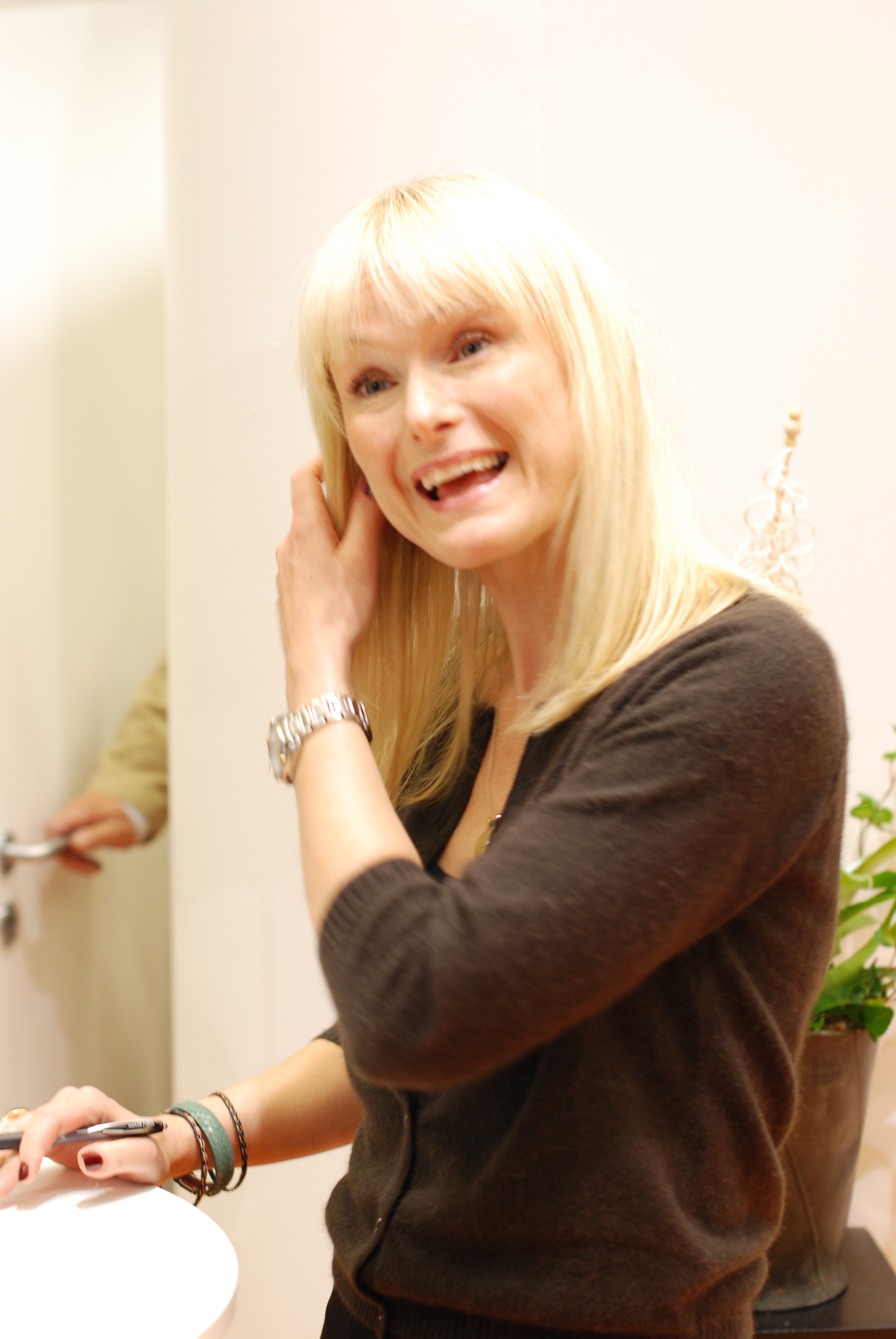
- CajsaStina Åkerström in 2010

Background information
- Born: 16 August 1967 (age 58)
- Origin: Stockholm, Sweden
- Occupations: Singer, author, painter
- Website: http://www.cajsastina.se

CajsaStina Åkerström (Note: Cajsa Stina in registers.) (born 16 August 1967) is a Swedish singer-songwriter, painter and author. She is the daughter of singer Fred Åkerström.

== Biography ==
Her debut album was released by Warner Music in 1994. Åkerström has since released three more albums at Warner Music. She then started her own Calimba Records label in 2004 and has since released her forthcoming albums with different distributors.

Åkerström participated in Melodifestivalen 2014 in the third semi-final1 with the entry "En enkel sång" (A simple song).

She published her first novel, Du och jag farsan, in 2010.

During the COVID-19 pandemic, Åkerström shifted to painting. In June 2021, she had a first exhibition in her southeastern Sweden hometown Kalmar. The reaction was overwhelming, she sold all her first works and received all over positive reviews and media reactions both locally and domestically, including national TV.
