= Way Out West (festival) =

Annual music event in Gothenburg, Sweden

- Logo
- Frequency: Annually, for 3 days, during the 2nd weekend of August
- Locations: Slottsskogen, Gothenburg, Sweden
- Years active: 2007–present
- Organiser: Luger
- Website: www.wayoutwest.se

Way Out West is an annual three-day music festival held in Gothenburg, Sweden, during August that plays host to a variety of popular music artists mainly from the rock, electronic and hip-hop genres. The main festival is complemented with the club concept Stay Out West which features after-hours gigs at various venues around the city.

== History ==
The first festival was held in August 2007 in Slottsskogen on Friday and Saturday and at club venues on Thursday, Friday and Saturday nights. In 2012 the festival became a full-fledged three-day festival with live music in Slottsskogen even on Thursday. In addition to music, the festival has also grown to incorporate other cultural activities such as art exhibitions in Slottsskogen and film showings at cinemas around the city.

The festival has had a strong focus on being environmentally friendly and was the first festival in Sweden to become KRAV-certified. Citing environmental reasons, the festival announced on the evening before the first day of the 2012 festival that all food served to artists, staff and visitors during the festival would be vegetarian. This decision led to a furor of reactions, both positive and negative. The debate culminated with the Gothenburg tabloid GT giving away free sausages and meatballs outside the festival entrance – a move that resulted in a Twitter dispute between the festival's press chief Joel Borg, co-founder of the festival, and GT editors that was highlighted by the Swedish media.

The festival has won both national and international awards including: Gyllene Hjulet's 2012 Rights Holder for the Way Out West brand, Résumé's Monthly Outdoor Marketing Campaign, as well as the Most Innovative Festival at the MTV O Music Awards.

== Location ==
The main festival takes place in the 137 hectare Slottsskogen park in central Gothenburg. When the festival area closes for the night there are more performances at various venues in and around central Gothenburg for example Gothenburg Studios.

== 2007, August 9, 10, 11 ==
- ...And You Will Know Us by the Trail of Dead
- Albert Hammond Jr.
- Architecture in Helsinki
- The Ark
- The Besnard Lakes
- Big Bird
- Boredoms
- Brian James Gang
- CocoRosie
- Devendra Banhart
- Eagles of Death Metal
- Erykah Badu
- Florence Valentin
- Franke
- Function
- The Go! Team
- The Hellacopters
- Hello Saferide
- The Hives
- Jonas Game
- Juliette and the Licks
- Kanye West
- Koop
- Laakso
- Lady Sovereign
- Laleh
- Last Days of April
- Lily Allen (Show Cancelled (throat infection), Teddybears were the last minute replacement)
- Low
- Lykke Li
- Malajube
- Manu Chao
- Molotov Jive
- Moneybrother
- New Young Pony Club
- Patrick Watson
- Peter Bjorn and John
- The Pogues
- Primal Scream
- Regina Spektor
- Salem Al Fakir
- Shout Out Louds
- Sparta
- Spoon
- Säkert!
- Teenage Bad Girl
- Teddybears (last-minute replacement of Lily Allen)
- Those Dancing Days
- Thunder Express
- Timo Räisänen
- The Tough Alliance
- Voxtrot
- Wovenhand

== 2008, August 7, 8, 9 ==
Thursday	Friday	Saturday
Clubs: Four Tet; The Mae Shi; Silje Nes; Health; Ingrid Olava; The High Hats; Louis XIV; Pacific!; Buzzcocks; The Gutter Twins; Kleerup; No Age; Wildbirds & Peacedrums; Petter	Slottskogen: Lightspeed Champion; Buraka Som Sistema; Christian Kjellvander; Iron & Wine; Kenge Kenge; Mando Diao; Looptroop Rockers; The Sonics; Franz Ferdinand; Okkervil River; Sonic Youth; Grinderman; The National; Yeasayer; Sigur Rós; Broder Daniel; Clubs: Ikons; Kool DJ Dust; DJ Timubktu; Chords; Henry Fiat's Open Sore; Dengue Fever; Faca; Fanfarlo; I Are Droid; The Night Marchers; Scott Matthew; A.Human; Dapuntobeat; Dark Meat; The Dodos; Nina Ramsby & Ludvig Berghe	Slottskogen: Joan As Police Woman; José González; Kelis; The Bug; Caesars; Sahara Hotnights; Frida Hyvönen; Silverbullit; N.E.R.D; Fleet Foxes; Lil' Kim; Håkan Hellström; Booka Shade; The Flaming Lips; Neil Young; Lykke Li; Clubs: All Out Dubstep; Division of Laura Lee; A Place to Bury Strangers; Adam Tensta; Les Big Byrd; Park Hotell; Familjen; Hederos/Hellberg; Holy Fuck; Kristofer Åström & Rainaways

== 2009, August 13, 14, 15 ==
Thursday	Friday	Saturday
Clubs: AC4; Blitzen Trapper; The Bronx; Bruket; Crookers; Deportees; DJ Nibc; El Perro del Mar; Fontän; Hajen; Joel Alme; Loney, Dear; Rise Against; Sonjagon; St Vincent; Theodor Jensen	Slottsskogen: Antony and the Johnsons; Arctic Monkeys; Band of Horses; Beirut; Bon Iver; Fever Ray; Florence and the Machine; Glasvegas; Grizzly Bear; Laakso; Robyn; Röyksopp; Seun Kuti & Fela's Egypt 80; Timo Räisänen; Vivian Girls; Wilco; Clubs: Andreas Grega; Andrew Bird; Anna von Hausswolff; The Big Pink; Chairlift; Crystal Antlers; Echo & the Bunnymen; Erol Alkan; The Irrepressibles; Jessica Lea Mayfield; Kornél Kovács; Mofeta & Jerre; Monotonix; The Morning Benders; Promoe; Vetiver	Slottsskogen: Amadou & Mariam; Asher Roth; Basement Jaxx; Calexico; Dead Prez; Florence Valentin; ingenting; Jenny Wilson; Lily Allen; My Bloody Valentine; Nas; Olle Ljungström; Patrick Wolf; Teddybears; Vampire Weekend; Wolfmother; Clubs: Adolescents; All Out Dubstep; David Sandström; Deerhunter; Final Fantasy; First Aid Kit; Form One; Fox Machine; Gang Gang Dance; Jay Reatard; Ladyhawke; Let's Wrestle; Loosegoats; L-Wiz; Magnetic Man; Max Peezay; Peter Broderick; Skriet; WALE; Woodpigeon

== 2010, August 12, 13, 14 ==
Thursday	Friday	Saturday
Clubs: Almedal; Bear in Heaven; Caribou; Division of Laura Lee; The Early Days; Felix Da Housecat; Field Music; Graveyard; Harlem; Anna Ihlis; Ikons; irK + Trickykid; jj; Junip; Laidback Luke; The Low Anthem; Nettle; Quest; Rambling Nicholas Heron; Ras G & The Afrikan Space Program; Silkie; Sleepy Sun; Slow Club; Steget; The Tallest Man on Earth; Tinie Tempah; Villagers	Slottsskogen: Beach House; Iggy & The Stooges; Imperial State Electric; Jónsi; Jens Lekman; The National; LCD Soundsystem; Local Natives; M.I.A.; Panda Bear; Rango; Miike Snow; The Soundtrack of Our Lives with Gothenburg Symphony; Paul Weller; Wu-Tang Clan; The xx; Clubs: DJ Bacid; Basia Bulat; Cymbals Eat Guitars; Den Svenska Björnstammen; Ludwig Bell; CIAfrica; Jon Dasilva; Fool's Gold; Fulmakten7; Daniel Gilbert; Glasvegas DJ-set; The Isolation; Kali; Karlsson & Winnberg (Miike Snow) DJ-set; Kasban; Me and My Army; Ulrik Munther; Mary N'diaye; Radio Slave; DJ /rupture; Rye Rye; Sleigh Bells; Spiders; Surfer Blood; Andreas Söderlund; Taken by Trees; Teddybears DJ-set; Vit Päls; Wild Nothing	Slottsskogen: Broken Bells; The Chemical Brothers; The Drums; Girls; Anna von Hausswolff; Håkan Hellström; Konono N°1; La Roux; Lykke Li; Marina and the Diamonds; Mumford & Sons; Pavement; The Radio Dept.; Reflection Eternal; Shout Out Louds; Anna Ternheim; Clubs: Axwell; Bad Hands; Bombus; Chapel Club; Dada Life; Die Antwoord; EF; Mary Anne Hobbs; I Blame Coco; INVSN; Kriget; Anton Kristiansson; Laura Marling; MRTN STHLM BEAT; Mutamassik; Daniel Norgren; Promoe & CosmiC aka Freedom Writers; Samling; Christopher Sander med vänner; Shearwater; Sås feat Carli, Marcus Price & Jexpert; Trash Talk; Tune-Yards; VästKust Rockerz & Killa Clowns

== 2011, August 11, 12, 13 ==
Slottsskogen

- Ariel Pink's Haunted Graffiti
- The Avett Brothers
- Edward Sharpe and the Magnetic Zeros
- Empire of the Sun
- Explosions in the Sky
- Fleet Foxes
- Fake Blood
- Anna von Hausswolff
- The Hives
- Noah and the Whale
- iamamiwhoami
- Anna Järvinen
- The Jayhawks
- Christian Kjellvander
- Loney Dear
- MF Doom
- Janelle Monáe
- Prince
- Pulp
- Robyn
- Säkert!
- Santigold
- The Tallest Man on Earth
- Thåström
- Tiësto
- Twin Shadow
- Kanye West
- Jenny Wilson & Tensta Gospel Choir
- Wiz Khalifa
- Jamie Woon

Stay Out West (Clubs)

- About Group
- Mattias Alkberg
- Aloe Blacc
- James Blake
- Butch
- Felix Cartal
- Russ Chimes
- Cloud Control
- D/R/U/G/S
- Dante
- Matthew Dear
- Deathcrush
- Dem Slackers
- Den stora vilan
- Destroyer
- The Don Darlings
- Dundertåget
- Nicolai Dunger
- Simon Emanuel
- Fibes, Oh Fibes
- Fucked Up
- Wolfgang Gartner
- Glass Candy
- Glasser
- Idiot Wind
- Jonathan Johansson
- Kissy Sell Out
- Koreless
- Les Big Byrd
- Little Dragon
- Low
- Jonas Lundqvist
- Masquer
- Me and My Army
- Nina Natri
- Off!
- Okkervil River
- Owl Vision
- Pascal
- PH3
- Planningtorock
- Marcus Price (DJ-set)
- Puro Instinct
- The Radio Dept.
- Rebecca & Fiona
- Ringo Deathstarr
- Safehouse Staff
- SBTRKT
- Simian Ghost
- Heidi Spencer & The Rare Birds
- Style of Eye
- Syket
- Team Rockit
- Those Dancing Days
- Thulebasen
- Timber Timbre
- Top Hawk
- Totally Enormous Extinct Dinosaurs
- Hanna Turi
- Twinflower Band
- Chad Valley
- Chad VanGaalen
- Warpaint
- Alexis Weak
- White Denim
- WU LYF
- Yuck
- Zola Jesus

Source: http://www.wayoutwest.se/

== 2012, August 9, 10, 11 ==
Slottsskogen

- Afghan Whigs
- ASAP Rocky
- Best Coast
- The Black Keys
- Blur
- Bon Iver
- Billy Bragg
- Ane Brun
- Common
- De la Soul
- Deportees
- Feed Me
- Feist
- The Field
- First Aid Kit
- Florence + The Machine
- I Break Horses
- Jean Grae
- Anna von Hausswolff
- Hot Chip
- Ben Howard
- Frida Hyvönen
- King Krule
- Kraftwerk
- Laleh
- Looptroop Rockers
- Mogwai
- Nneka
- Mark Lanegan Band
- Miike Snow
- Thurston Moore
- Oberhofer
- OFWGKTA
- Refused
- Jonathan Richman
- The Royal Concept
- St. Vincent
- The War on Drugs
- Wilco
- Yelawolf

Stay Out West (Clubs)

- 7 Seconds
- Alberta Cross
- Adolescents
- Aleks
- Alt-J
- Love Antell
- Hans Appelqvist
- Araabmuzik
- Sibille Attar
- Bassjackers
- Bellaboo
- Bobby Tank
- Bowerbirds
- Boy & Bear
- Ceremony
- Nadja Chatti
- Chromatics
- Cloud Nothings
- Death Grips
- Christian Dinamarca
- Division of Laura Lee (DJ-set)
- Django Django
- Duvchi
- Effektverket
- Beatrice Eli
- Elliphant
- El Perro del Mar
- The Embassy
- Femtastic DJs
- Femtastic Soundsystem (Cleo, Frida Scar, Sabina Ddumba)
- F.O.O.L.
- The Frederik
- Friends
- Fritjof & Pikänen
- Leo Forssell & William Hamilton
- Galantis
- Genius of Time
- Gnucci & VAZ
- Grillat & Grändy
- Haim
- How to Dress Well
- Iceage
- Anna Ihlis
- INGRID
- Jacuzzi Boys
- Adam Kanyama
- Kellermensch
- Kill FM
- Kill the Noise
- Kindness
- Kingdom of Evol
- King Krule
- Korallreven
- Lady Chann
- Lång-Kalle
- Lightships
- Lower
- Lower Dens
- Jonas Lundqvist
- Lune
- Leo Netz & Noah Gibson
- Madeon
- John Maus
- Mazzy Star
- Megafaun
- Memoryhouse
- Milagres
- Sandra Mosh
- Bob Mould
- MRTN
- Museum of Bellas Artes
- Nause
- Niki & the Dove
- Nite Jewel
- Noisia
- Numbers (Deadboy, Redinho, Oneman, Spencer, Jackmaster)
- Owl Vision
- Papa M
- Josh T. Pearson
- Pjotr & Staffan
- Purity Ring
- Marcus Price
- Promoe & Cosmic (DJ-set)
- Rambling Nicolas Heron
- Refused
- Rodriguez
- Rudimental
- Safari Sound
- Sameblod
- Sankt Göran
- Savages
- Sei A
- Skriet
- John de Sohn
- Solander
- Stage of Drama
- Studio Barnhus
- Summercamp
- The Suzan
- Swedish Tiger & Toffer
- Swamp 81 (Pinch, Mickey Pearce, Loefah & McChunky, Boddika)
- Swans
- Tennis Bafra
- TNGHT
- Oliver Twizt
- Out of Vogue
- Vondelpark
- Waters
- Wayne & Woods
- Well Rounded (Donga, James Foxx, XXXY, Leon Vynehall)
- Rico Won (med Meta Four)
- Zero Boys
- Zhala

Source: http://www.wayoutwest.se/sv/artister

== 2013, August 8, 9, 10 ==
Slottsskogen

- Daniel Adams-Ray
- Alabama Shakes
- Amason
- Sibile Attar
- Bat for Lashes
- Beach House
- James Blake
- Danny Brown
- Crystal Fighters
- Cat Power
- Ravi Coltrane
- Iris Dement
- Disclosure
- Dungen
- Goat
- Godspeed You! Black Emperor
- Grimes
- Haim
- Angel Haze
- Håkan Hellström
- Johnossi
- Junip
- Jupiter and Okwess International
- Alicia Keys
- The Knife
- Kendrick Lamar
- La Yegros
- Little Boots
- Cheikh Lô
- Local Natives
- Miguel
- Of Monsters and Men
- Phosphorescent
- Public Enemy
- Quadron
- Rodriguez
- Omar Souleyman
- Tame Impala
- Ben Zabo

Stay Out West (Clubs)

- 1991
- Acronym
- Airhead
- AKA
- All That Is
- Allah-Las
- Austra
- Autre Ne Veut
- Badin
- Basement Space
- Rikard "Skizz" Bizzi
- Mykki Blanco
- Zacharias Blad
- Bogl & Myka 9
- Fabian Bruhn
- Cake
- Cashmere Cat
- Kim Cesarion
- Nadja Chatti
- Channel 3
- Sousou & Maher Cissoko
- Maya Jane Coles
- Colors
- Henric de la Cour
- Mikal Cronin
- Darwin & Backwall
- Deptford Goth
- DJ Rashad & DJ Spinn
- Ducktails
- Easy October
- El Perro del Mar (twice)
- Electric Wire Hustle
- Ulf Eriksson
- Evian Christ
- Frak
- Gerilja
- Gnucci
- Goran Kajfes Subtropic Arkestra
- Graveyard
- HKOCHD
- Julia Holter
- Honningbarna
- Daniel Hunt of Ladytron
- Jenny Hval
- Indians
- Ingrid Disco (Lykke Li, Miike Snow, Peter Bjorn and John etc.)
- Jagwa Music
- Jesaja & Lazee
- jj
- Johanna Ritscher
- Kaah
- Kate Boy
- Kill FM
- Koreless
- Kwaai
- Kärleksklubben
- Könsförrädare
- André Laos
- Little Jinder
- Looptroop Rockers
- Lorentz & Sakarias
- Lucy Love (twice)
- Lune
- Mack Beats
- Makthaverskan
- Mariam the Believer
- Steve Mason
- Mattias Alkbergs begravning
- Max Peezay
- Megatron
- Merchandise
- MF/MB/
- Minilogue
- Money
- Mount Kimbie
- Mr. Tophat & Art Alfie
- Nils Berg Cinemascope
- Norma
- The Order
- Pissed Jeans
- Postiljonen
- Taragana Pyrajama
- Quiltland
- Abdulla Rashim
- Porter Robinson
- Samlingen (thrice)
- Sand Circles
- Sankt Göran
- Sasha
- Say Lou Lou
- Shout Out Louds
- Skaters
- Slugabed
- Sohn
- Spectrals
- Squarehead
- The Staves
- Stay Positive
- Stor, Linda Pira & Salazar Brothers
- Studio Barnhus
- Summer Heart
- Svensk bas
- Swim Deeo
- Syket
- Taken by Trees
- These New Puritans
- Tigers of the Temple
- TM404
- Tokimonsta
- Trappmusik
- Tsol
- Unknown Mortal Orchestra
- Urban Cone
- Varg
- Venus X
- Villagers
- Jenny Wilson
- Yast

Azealia Banks, Neil Young & Crazy Horse, and Solange were booked but cancelled their shows.

== 2014 ==
Slottsskogen

- Joey Badass
- Blood Orange
- Brody Dalle
- Mark Ernestus presents Jeri-Jeri
- The Julie Ruin
- Les Ambassadeurs feat Salif Keita, Amadou Bagayoko & Cheick Tidiane Seck
- Little Dragon
- Janelle Monáe
- MØ
- The National
- Neutral Milk Hotel
- Outkast
- Pusha T
- Queens of the Stone Age
- Röyksopp & Robyn
- Jenny Wilson

Stay Out West (Clubs)

- Circa Waves
- Deafheaven
- Ella Eyre
- Forest Swords
- Holly Herndon
- Chlöe Howl
- Hozier
- I Break Horses
- Jungle
- Lorentz
- Machinedrum (DJ-set)
- Mighty Oaks
- Nguzunguzu
- Shlohmo
- Jonathan Wilson

== 2015 ==
Way Out West 2015 was held on August 13 to 15.

Line-up

Flamingo
Thursday: Belle and Sebastian, The War on Drugs, Beck
Friday: Angélique Kidjo, Emmylou Harris & Rodney Crowell, Ms. Lauryn Hill, Pet Shop Boys
Saturday: Lianne La Havas, Chic featuring Nile Rodgers, Alt-J, First Aid Kit

Azalea
Thursday: Kindness, Foxygen, Kygo
Friday: Father John Misty, Tove Lo, Tyler, the Creator, Florence and the Machine
Saturday: The Unthanks, Jhené Aiko, Patti Smith, Ellie Goulding

Linné
Thursday: Savages, Future Brown, Future Islands, ILoveMakonnen, Susanne Sundfør, FKA Twigs
Friday: Sturgill Simpson, The Julie Ruin, Years & Years, Little Jinder, Caribou, Flying Lotus, Galantis
Saturday: Sun Kil Moon, Zhala, Rae Morris, Amason, Run the Jewels, Lorentz, Ride

Dungen
Thursday: Sumorai, Mumdance & Novelist, The 2 Bears, AV AV AV, F R A N S K I L D, Drippin, Yung Gud
Friday: Y+M, Smerz, Daphni, Axel Boman, Kornél Kovács, Sankt Göran, Courtesy, André Laos
Saturday: Clea Herlöfsson, Todd Terje & The Olsens, Jin Mustafa, Kajsa Haidl, Towlie, Dorisburg, Nadja Chatti

Magasin 105
Thursday: Courtney Barnett, GOAT
Friday: Urban Cone, Jonathan Johansson
Saturday: Hudson Mohawke, Tove Styrke

Honduras
Thursday: Death Team, Maja Francis, LA Priest
Friday: Titiyo, Benjamin Booker, Shura

Made by Sweden
Saturday: Viola Martinsson, Call Me, Parham, XOV, Say Lou Lou

Panama
Thursday: Sianna, Sakarias, Vince Staples, Nadya
Friday: Hayden James, Petite Meller, Annamelina, Le1f
Saturday: S!vas & Ukendt Kunstner, Little Simz, Madi Banja, Thaiboy Digital

Pustervik Stora
Thursday: Viet Cong, Iceage
Friday: Natalie Prass, Waxahatchee, Woods
Saturday: Low Roar, Soak, Slowgold

Pustervik Lilla
Thursday: Tor Miller
Friday: PINS
Saturday: Ought

Gothenburg Studio 1
Thursday: Noonie Bao, Låpsley, Shamir
Friday: Ibeyi, Elias, Kleerup
Saturday: Chris Olsson, Deportees, Ratatat

FOLK Röda
Thursday: Aurora, Dolce, Kae Tempest, Wildbirds & Peacedrums
Friday: Rhodes, Bad Breeding, Dan Deacon, White Fence, Sunn O)))

Saturday: Hookworms, Residual Kid, Mini Mansions, Yung, Hey Elbow

== 2016 ==
Way Out West 2016 was held on August 11 to 13.

Line-up

Flamingo
Thursday: M83, The Last Shadow Puppets, Morrissey
Friday: James Bay, Grace Jones, The Tallest Man on Earth, PJ Harvey
Saturday: Ane Brun, Big Sean, Seinabo Sey, Sia

Azalea
Thursday: Jason Isbell, Chvrches, The Libertines
Friday: Anderson .Paak & The Free Nationals, G-Eazy, Zara Larsson, Anohni
Saturday: Eagles of Death Metal, Deportees, Jamie xx, Massive Attack & Young Fathers

Linné
Thursday: Basia Bulat, Daughter, Laura Mvula, Anna von Hausswolff, Chelsea Wolfe, Kaytranada
Friday: Erik Lundin, Kamasi Washington, Julia Holter, Aurora, Nicole Sabouné, Hurula, Yung Lean
Saturday: Daniel Norgren, Beth Orton, Jack Garratt, Descendents, Stormzy, Travis Scott, Skepta

Dungen
Thursday: Ishivu, Talaboman, Paula Temple, Jessie Granqvist, Kablam, Josefine Hellström Hansson
Friday: Samoa Joe, Floating Points, Jessy Lanza, Sevdaliza, Gander/Örnell, Shakarchi & Stranéus
Saturday: Mai Nestor, Auður, Nao, Mura Masa, Kenton Slash Demon, Toxe, Johanna Knutsson

Höjden
Thursday: Vasas Flora och Fauna
Saturday: Amanda Bergman

Hagakyrkan
Thursday: Trixie Whitley, Albin Lee Meldau
Friday: Klara Lewis, Julianna Barwick, Tim Hecker
Saturday: Lucy Claire, William Basinski, Hauschka

Pustervik Stora
Thursday: KING, Bob Moses
Friday: Liima, Whitney, Dua Lipa
Saturday: Skott, Bibi Bourelly, Niki & The Dove, The Damned

Pustervik Lilla
Thursday: Dagny
Friday: Joan Shelley
Saturday: Cloves

Nefertiti
Thursday: Oscar, Eagulls, Moon City Boys
Friday: Avantgardet, Bleached, Pascal
Saturday: Merely, Mabel, Postiljonen

Magasin 105
Thursday: Daniel Adams-Ray, Kvelertak, Peter Bjorn and John
Friday: Elliphant, Little Jinder
Saturday: Mapei, AlunaGeorge

Honduras
Thursday: Beach Slang, Frank Carter and the Rattlesnakes, Fidlar, Viagra Boys
Friday: Rat Boy, Peaches, Arca
Saturday: Formation, Ana Diaz, The Internet

Panama
Thursday: Lemaitre, Section Boyz, Karpe Diem
Friday: Tom Misch, The Range, Duvchi, Joy
Saturday: Beri, Tkay Maidza, Cherrie, Lady Leshurr

Gothenburg Studio 1
Thursday: Fire! Orchestra, Thundercat, Dungen
Friday: Cleo, Talib Kweli, De La Soul
Saturday: Sleaford Mods, Flag, The Damned

Gothenburg Studio 3
Thursday: Morgan Delt, Algiers
Friday: Reeps One, Rosh

Saturday: Arre! Arre!

== 2017 ==
Way Out West 2017 was held on August 10 to 12.

Line-up

Flamingo
Thursday: The Shins, Migos, Frank Ocean
Friday: Sabina Ddumba, MØ, Ryan Adams, Major Lazer
Saturday: George Ezra, Oskar Linnros, Band of Horses, Lana Del Rey

Azalea
Thursday: Beth Ditto, Flume, Pixies
Friday: Jonathan Johansson, Mac DeMarco, Feist, The xx Saturday: Linnea Henriksson, Conor Oberst, London Grammar, Regina Spektor

Linné
Thursday: The Radio Dept., Angel Olsen, Danny Brown, Tove Styrke, Young Thug, Graveyard
Friday: Jens Lekman, Perfume Genius, Vince Staples, Thee Oh Sees, Fatoumata Diawara & Hindi Zahra, The Afghan Whigs, Sampha Saturday: Eva Dahlgren, Lisa Hannigan, Tycho, Frida Hyvönen, Stor, The Blaze

Dungen
Thursday: Beniwasta, The Black Madonna, Courtesy, Arkajo, Kornél Kovács
Friday: Åska Saga, Anna Kohlin, Jon Hopkins, Mobilegirl, Violet, Haidl, Sandra Mosh
Saturday: Malin Wester, Yung Sherman, Cashmere Cat, Filip Hunter, Maya Lourenço B2B Flord King, Fatima Yamaha, Marlena Lampinen, Art Alfie

Magasin 105
Thursday: Anne-Marie, Lorentz
Friday: Rebecca & Fiona, Diplo
Saturday: Säkert!, Shout Out Louds

Honduras
Thursday: Actress, Alma, Her
Friday: Blenda, Janice, Sigrid
Saturday: Rhys, Léon, Phlake

Panama
Thursday: Marie Davidson, Jarami, Young M.A
Friday: Kelly Lee Owens, 070 Shake, Ikhana
Saturday: Ary, Jessie Reyez, Mwuana

Pustervik Stora
Thursday: Anna of the North, Tash Sultana
Friday: Vasas Flora Och Fauna, Julia Jacklin
Saturday: Hurray for the Riff Raff, Fantastic Negrito

Pustervik Lilla
Thursday: Let's Eat Grandma
Friday: Lydia Ainsworth
Saturday: ShitKid

Folk
Thursday: Sunflower Bean, El Perro del Mar, Avantgardet
Friday: Sarah Klang, Big Thief, INVSN
Saturday: Kiki, Kikagaku Moyo, Josefin Öhrn & The Liberation

Rondo
Thursday: Jireel, Sammy & Johnny Bennett, Stefflon Don
Friday: Fireside, Death Grips

Saturday: Avalon Emerson, Marcel Dettmann

== 2018 ==
Way Out West 2018 was held on August 9 to 11.

Line-up

Flamingo
Thursday: Nils Frahm, Patti Smith, Arctic Monkeys
Friday: Timbuktu & Damn, Miriam Bryant, M.I.A., Kendrick Lamar
Saturday: Kamasi Washington, Little Jinder, Lykke Li, Arcade Fire

Azalea
Thursday: Grizzly Bear, St. Vincent, Iggy Pop
Friday: Near, Fricky, Lily Allen, Fever Ray
Saturday: KOKOKO!, Markus Krunegård, Fleet Foxes, Thåström

Linné
Thursday: Sarah Klang, Jenny Lewis, Jorja Smith, Charlotte Gainsbourg, Brockhampton, Raye
Friday: Courtney Marie Andrews, King Gizzard & the Lizard Wizard, Noname, J Hus, Skott, 6lack, Popsicle
Saturday: Daniel Adams-Ray X Human, Tangerine Dream, Sigrid, Dirty Projectors, Mwuana, Mura Masa, Bonobo

Dungen
Thursday: Fiffi, Peggy Gou, Octo Octa, Denis Sulta, Off the Meds
Friday: Hardcore Cutie, Baba Stiltz, Joy Orbison, DJ Lag, Jozi Nights, Tora Vinter, Cora Novoa, Lena Willikens
Saturday: Fatima Osman, Mount Liberation Limited, Moodymann, Yaeji, Nadja Chatti, Ena Cosovic, Ebende

Almedalskyrkan
Thursday: Rhye
Friday: Anna Ternheim
Saturday: Susanne Sundfør

Folkteatern
Thursday: Sibille Attar, Nadia Nair
Friday: Amyl and the Sniffers, Holy
Saturday: The Magic Gang, Vacation Forever

Panama
Thursday: Drain Gang, IAMDDB, Ozzy
Friday: Bad Gyal, Sassy 009, Palmistry
Saturday: Blen, Showit, Imenella, Rosh

Honduras
Thursday: Superorganism, Yungblud, Pale Honey
Friday: Becky and the Birds, Snoh Aalegra, Grant
Saturday: Dead Vibrations, Dream Wife, Elias

YouTube Music Stage: Magasin 105
Thursday: Marlene Oak, The Brian Jonestown Massacre, Chelsea Wolfe, Anna von Hausswolff
Friday: NBL Sound, Oskar Linnros, Parham
Saturday: Lune, Hurula, Jenny Wilson

Dunge(o)n
Thursday: Martina Menfors, Towlie, Daniel Avery
Friday: DJ Clea, Shakarchi & Stranéus, Studio Barnhus A/V
Saturday: Åska-Saga, Kablam, Suicideyear

Pustervik Stora
Thursday: The Lemon Twigs, Phoebe Bridgers, Ariel Pink
Friday: Moses Sumney, Alex Cameron
Saturday: Kevin Morby, Loney, Dear

Pustervik Lilla
Thursday: Hildur
Friday: Mogli

Saturday: Violet Skies

== 2019 ==
Way Out West 2019 was held on August 8 to 10.

Flamingo
Thursday	Friday	Saturday
Jorja Smith; Zara Larsson; Silvana Imam	The Cure; Veronica Maggio; Pharoah Sanders Quartet; Daniel Norgren	Solange; Erykah Badu; Amason
Azalea
James Blake; Blood Orange; Bamako to Birmingham featuring Amadou & Mariam and The Blind Boys of Alabama	Seinabo Sey; Stefflon Don; Jireel; Jungle	Stormzy; Christine and the Queens; Cherrie; Dermot Kennedy
Linné
Jon Hopkins (Live); Spiritualized; Neneh Cherry; David August; Idles; Julien Baker	The Blaze; Khruangbin; Nao; Stereolab; Mitski; 100 Live: Aden x Asme, Fatima Jelassi, Z.E, Ison & Fille, Imenella, and Ant Wan	Viagra Boys; Maribou State; Rex Orange County; Earl Sweatshirt; Little Dragon; Madi Banja
Red Bull Dungen
Johanna Schneider B2B Nico O'Konor; Bella Sarris; Sassy J; Dam-Funk; Moonilena	Charlotte Bendiks; Samir Yosufi; Upsammy; Suzanne Kraft; Hunee; Samo DJ B2B Zoltan	Bella Boo; Ishi Vu; Perel; Polanco; Honey Dijon; Hannah Prescott; Italo Bitches
Magasin 105
Vargas and Lagola; Z.E	Yung Lean; Iceage	Miriam Bryant; Deportees
Honduras
The Japanese House; Mahalia	Linn Koch-Emmery; Hyukoh	NOTD; Shura
Panama
Yxng Bane; Tirzah	Dani M; Henok Achido; Ros	DJ TiiNY
Dungeon
Dorisburg; Parallex Deep (Live); Laurel Halo; DJ Lily	Kornél Kovács; 박혜진 Park Hye Jin; Aron McFaul	Femi; Sinjin Hawke & Zora Jones (DJ set); Fakethias; Fever
Pustervik Stora
Connan Mockasin; Soccer Mommy; Stella Donnelly	Parcels; Lil Halima	Kokoroko; Makaya McCraven
Pustervik Lilla
Ider	Lauran Hibberd	Durand Jones & The Indications
Oceanen
Orville Peck; Bedouine	Georgia; Morabeza Tobacco	Augustine; Virginia and the Flood
Musikens Hus
—N/a	Fatima; Loyle Carner	Nadia Tehran; Lafawndah

== 2022 ==
Way Out West 2022 was held on August 11 to 13.

Flamingo
Thursday	Friday	Saturday
Tame Impala; Amason; The Tallest Man on Earth	Nick Cave and the Bad Seeds; Chance the Rapper; Michael Kiwanuka; Kings of Convenience	Thåström; Burna Boy; Herbie Hancock; Mwuana
Azalea
First Aid Kit; Caribou; Koffee	Jamie xx; Léon; AJ Tracey; Oumou Sangaré	Dave; Girl in Red; Central Cee; Ane Brun
Linné
Yung Lean; Bikini Kill; Vargas and Lagola; Daniela Rathana; Black Country, New Road; Bonny Light Horseman	Princess Nokia; Kite; Perfume Genius; Little Simz; Arab Strap; Fontaines D.C.; Frida Hyvönen	MØ; Bright Eyes; Slowthai; Fred again..; Aldous Harding; Molchat Doma; Moonica Mac
Dungen
Kamma & Masalo; Prof. Stranger; Storken; TSHA; dj døden	Jeremy Olander; Molø; Mansa; Kampire; Jayda G; Magnus Nylander; Pomona Dream (DJ set)	Viggo Dyst; Dr. Echoe B2B Jahanam; Assia & Mid; Jyoty; Romy; Bella Boo; Mahsa Khoshnood
Höjden
Jada; Pa Salieu; Anaïs Mitchell; 100 Live: A36, Sarettii, Baby Mala, and Shiro	Sons of Kemet; Q; Beabadoobee; 100 Live: 1.Cuz, 23, L1NA; Holly Humberstone	A1 x J1; Nilüfer Yanya; Augustine; 100 Live: ADAAM, VC Barre; Hannes

== 2023 ==
Way Out West 2023 was held on 10-12 August 2023.

Thursday	Friday	Saturday
Slottsskogen: Tove Lo; Sara Parkman; Jacob Banks; Seinabo Sey; 070 Shake; Olivia Lobato; Wizkid; Caroline Polachek; King Gizzard & the Lizard Wizard; Stay Out West	Slottsskogen: Pusha T; Soundtrack of our lives; Blur; Maja Francis; Stor; Les Big Byrd; Christine and the Queens; Stay Out West	Slottsskogen: Viagra Boys; Boygenius; Håkan Hellström; Cherrie; Kelela; José González; Cleo; Bladee; The Blessed Madonna; D-block Europe; Snail Mail; Stay Out West: Terra; the Murder Capital

== 2024 ==
Way Out West 2024 was held on 8-10 August 2024.

Thursday	Friday	Saturday
Slottsskogen: Sarah Klang; Loyle Carner (UK); Big Thief (US); Air (FR); James Blake (UK); PJ Harvey (UK); Jack White (US); Faysa Idle; Little Jinder; Yves Tumor (US); Tkay Maidza (AUS); Thee Sacred Souls (US); Yaya Bey (US); Chase & Status (UK); the Kills (US/UK); Serpentwithfeet (US); Jessie Granqvist; Yung Singh (UK); Jess Hands & Joanna Party; Eris Drew & Octo Octa (AU/US); Anna Kohlin; Stay Out West: El Perro del Mar; Kasino; Angélica Garcia; The Thurston Moore Group; Kind Mod Kind; The New Eves; Joshua Idehen	Slottsskogen: Maisie Peters (UK); Ellen Krauss; Sampha (UK); Jessie Ware (UK); Tems (NG); Oskar Linnros; Pulp (UK); Fred Again (UK); Annika Norlin & Jonas Teglund; Blondshell (US); Alvvays (CA); L'Imperatrice (FR); Darkoo (UK); Overmono; Slowdive; Arc de Soleil; Glass Beams; Nation of Language; Artemas; Goran Kajfes Tropiques; Charlotte Day Wilson; De Clair; Elcay; DJ Beverage; Barry Can't Swim; Bibi Seck; Memphis LK; Lex Ludlow; Filippa Bernander; Stay Out West: Markus Krunegård; Felix Sandman; Full Body 2	Slottsskogen: Arooj Aftab (PK/US); Andre 3000 (US); J Hus (UK); Susanne Sundfør (NO); Peggy Gou (KR); Benjamin Ingrosso; Fever Ray; The National (US); Augustine; Amanda Bergman; Icona Pop; Markus Krunegård; Kenya Grace (UK); Skepta (UK); Yasin Bey (US); Olof Dreijer & Diva Cruz; Terra; Hurray for the Riff Raff (US); Wednesday (US); Stella Explorer; Linn Koch-Emmery; Ayla; Nyreau & Karl F Eugen; Ari Bald & CJ Scott; DJ Seinfeld; Prof. Stranger; Karen Nyame KG; Mamdouh313; Merve; Stay Out West: Sadboi (CA); BXKS; Pretty Girl (AU); Mount Kimbie; University; Jackie Mere; DJ Carpenter; Killen.; Kasbo; Nokta Servo; Lekaye; Shiro; 1.CUZ; Yung Filly; MRCY; Alba August; Klara Keller; the Tarantula Waltz

Queens of the Stone Age were booked, but cancelled due to illness. Jack White replaced them. The Smile was booked, but cancelled their gig due to illness. James Blake replaced them. Amaarae and A36 also cancelled due to personal reasons, and were replaced by Darkoo, 1.Cuz and Shiro.

== 2025 ==
Way Out West 2025 was held on August 7-9 August 2025.

Thursday	Friday	Saturday
Slottsskogen: Kite; Iggy Pop; Queens of the Stone Age; Fontaines D.C.; BICEP present CHROMA; Refused; Beth Gibbons; Amaarae; Kneecap; Cymande; Nilüfer Yanya; Mavis Staples; Becky and the Birds; Geordie Greep; Jasmine.4.T; Luvcat; Moonchild Sanelly; David Jackson; DJ Rawel; Effy; Mall Grab; sim0ne; Stay Out West: Alan Sparhawk; Carson McHone; Daniel Romano's Outfit; EKKSTACY; Ganavya; Girl Scout; GIRLBAND!; H. Self; NOFUN!; Pearl Charles; Venus Anon; Yttling Jazz	Slottsskogen: Charli XCX; Yung Lean & Bladee; Hermanos Gutiérrez; Wet Leg; Khruangbin; Mk.gee; Molly Sandén; CMAT; MJ Lenderman & The Wind; Little Simz; Kelly Lee Owens; Pa Salieu; Arp Frique & the Perpetual Singers; Annie & The Caldwells; YUKIMI; Cherrie; Dizzy; Mwuana; Obongjayar; Seun Kuti & Egypt 80; Westside Gunn & Smoke DZA; Eliza Rose; JoolZ; Junior Simba; Kornél Kovács; Mechatok; salute; Vilhelm Hasselgren + Boj Lucki; Stay out west: Talaboman; The Dare; Waterbaby; Bartees Strange; Adam Olenius; BIJI; Jjulius; La Lom; Nektar; Paula Tape; Real Lies; Valkyrien Allstars	Slottsskogen: Chappell Roan; Pet Shop Boys; Lola Young; Daniela Rathana; Hurula; Deki Alem; GOAT; Montell Fish; Noname; Omar Rudberg; Jonathan Johansson; Avantgardet; Black Star; Confidence Man; Erik Lundin; Greentea Peng; Kerstin Ljungström; ODUMODUBLVCK; PinkPantheress; The Joy; Timbuktu & The Rakiem Walker Project; Stay out west: Jeshi; Maja Francis; Isak Benjamin; Cassandra Jenkins; Ebba Åsman; Horse Vision; John Glacier; Josef Slunge; Late Night med Christopher Garplind; LUCY (Cooper B. Handy)

== 2026 ==
Way Out West 2026 was held from 13 to 15 August 2026. It was the first edition in the festival's history to sell out in every ticket category.

Thursday	Friday	Saturday
Slottsskogen: Moby; Lily Allen; Zara Larsson; The xx; Clipse; Anna von Hausswolff; Oklou; David Ritschard; Alessi Rose; Arthur Verocai; Σtella; Yaeger; DJ Boring; COBRAH; Dove Ellis; Kasino; Ben UFO; Haivai B b2b NORAH; HiTech; Jehnny Beth; Mattias El Mansouri; Roni; Stay Out West: Ninajirachi; Earl Sweatshirt; Freak Slug; Mietze Conte; My New Band Believe; Bricknasty; James Yorkston & Johanna Söderberg; Thaiboy Digital; Agitator; Andreas Tilliander & Goran Kajfeš; Fantasy of a Broken Heart; GB; Hayeminol; Knut€; Matilda Lyn; The Alchemist; Tiffi M; Weatherday	Slottsskogen: The Cure; Nick Cave & The Bad Seeds; The Hives; Blood Orange; Geese; Dijon; Lykke Li; Four Tet; Bonnie “Prince” Billy; Lambrini Girls; Jalen Ngonda; Ravyn Lenae; Nu Genea; Fcukers; Annahstasia; Rochelle Jordan; Ash Lauryn; Killen. (DJ-set); Sara Parkman; Nektar; Saoirse B2B Leon Vynehall; Son Rompe Pera; Jacob Alon; Joel Alme; Qendresa; Anish Kumar; Anna-My B2B MOLØ; Hanna Ojanen; Kim Öhman; Stay Out West: Agnes; Honey Dijon; Melody's Echo Chamber; Josh Caffé; Dgeral; Småland; Esther; Sven Wunder; Elise Elvira; Fanny Avonne; Greg Freeman; Helen Sun; JoolZ; Kimia & Thilly; OG Bella; ORKID; Radio Free Alice; Rian Brazil; Sailor Honeymoon; Sharp Pins	Slottsskogen: Gorillaz; Lorde; sombr; Veronica Maggio; Wilco; Terra; Current Joys; Ezra Collective; Maribou State; Anoushka Shankar; Smerz; Joshua Idehen; Kettama; Peder Mannerfelt; Mohajer; S-candalo; Swank Mami; Hannes; Raghd; Celeste; The Magnolia; Svart Ridå; AJ Tracey; Kiss Facility; Lila Iké; Saint Etienne; Daesta; Main Phase; Parsa; Stay Out West: Jane Remover; Hannah Cohen; Westside Cowboy; Olga Myko; Bleech 9:3; James K; Kid08; 9entle; A Good Year; Cockhouse; Fred Soila; Iceage; Les Big Byrd; Mami Umami; Marble; Nokta Servo; Sylvie’s Head; The Passion Tax; Vilhelm Hasselgren & Ebende
