= Hansson (surname) =

Hansson is a Swedish patronymic surname meaning "son of Hans": itself of the same origin as John via the Latin form Johannes. Notable people with the surname include:

Hansson is also an Icelandic surname when the father is unknown (hans translates as "his" in Icelandic), which was common among children born to Allied soldiers and Icelandic women in the aftermath of the Allied occupation of Iceland during World War II.

- Åke Hansson, multiple people
- Albert Hansson (born 2004), Swedish golfer
- Anders Hansson, multiple people
- Anette Hansson, Swedish footballer
- Bo Hansson (1943–2010), Swedish musician
- David Heinemeier Hansson (born 1979), Danish programmer
- Emil Hansson, multiple people
- Evert Hansson (1908–1979), Swedish footballer
- Hans Hansson, multiple people
- Henry Hansson (1918–1945), Norwegian resistance member
- Holger Hansson (1927–2014), Swedish footballer and manager
- Ingvar Hansson (born 1947), Swedish sailor and Olympic champion
- Johan Hansson (born 1979), Swedish footballer
- Malou Hansson (born 1983), Miss Sweden in 2002
- Marcus Hansson (born 1969), Swedish former 500cc Grand Prix motocross world champion
- Martin Hansson (born 1971), Swedish football referee
- Maud Hansson (1937–2020), Swedish film actress
- Mikael Hansson (born 1968), Swedish footballer
- Niran Hansson (born 1996), Thai footballer
- Ola Hansson (1860–1925), Swedish poet, prose writer
- Pär Hansson (born 1986), Swedish football goalkeeper
- Per Albin Hansson (1885–1946), Swedish Prime Minister
- Peter Hansson, Swedish guitarist
- Petter Hansson (born 1976), Swedish footballer
- Roger Hansson, multiple people
