= Vita Bergen (band) =

Swedish indie pop band

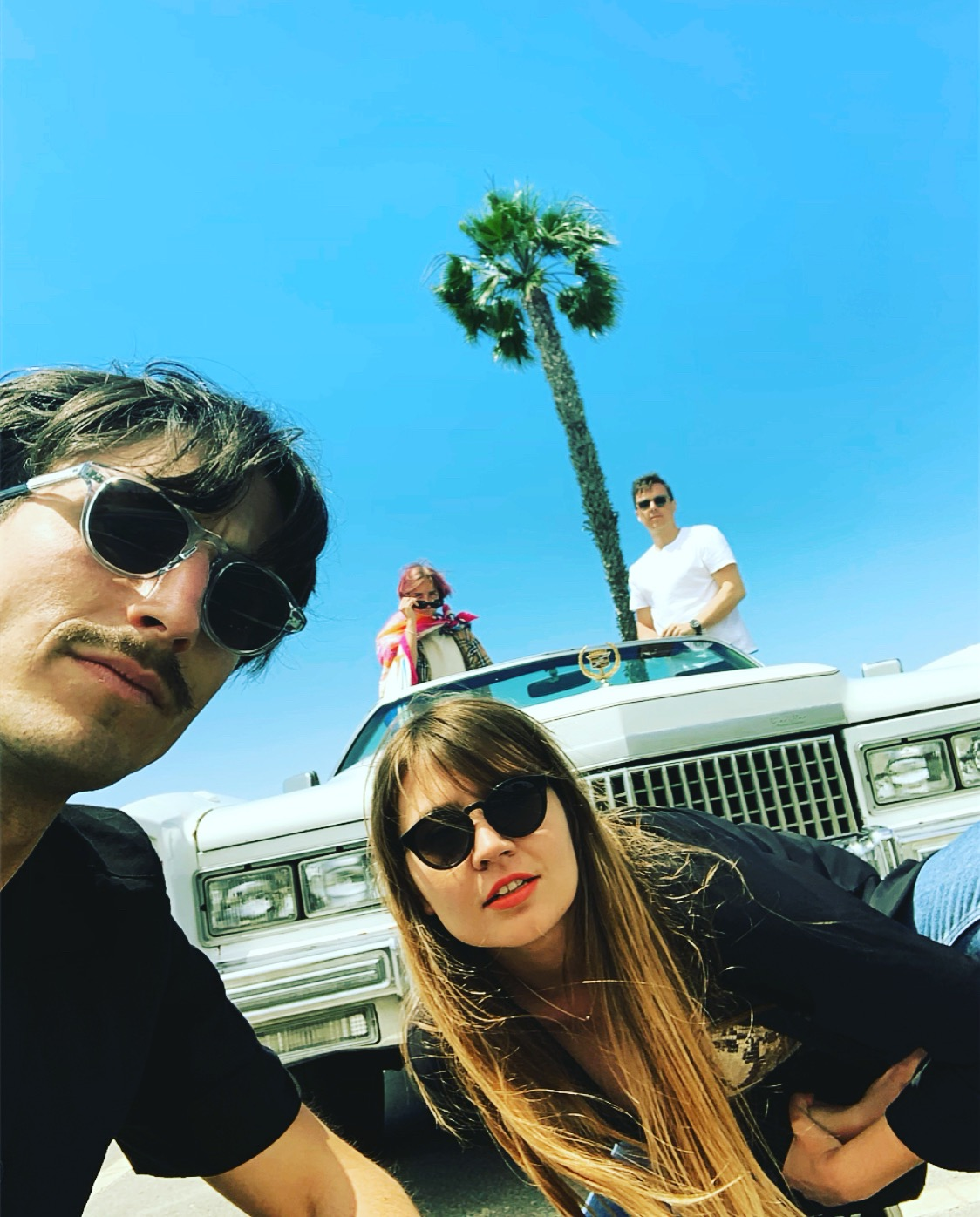
- Vita Bergen (Swe), press photo

Background information
- Origin: Gothenburg, Sweden
- Genres: indie pop, alternative pop, indie rock, post-punk revival
- Years active: 2014–present
- Labels: Kning Disk, Woah Dad!, Glitterhouse Records
- Members: William Hellström; Gustaf Gunér; Tuva Lodmark; Josefin Eklund; Patrik Wennberg
- Website: vitabergen.se

Vita Bergen is a Swedish indie pop act led by the multi-instrumentalist and producer William Hellström. Vita Bergen has done multiple tours in l tours which has done multiple tours in Europe and USA. Live, the band consists of Tuva Lodmark, Josefin Eklund, Gustaf Gunér and Patrik Wennberg.

== History ==
Vita Bergen, led by frontman William Hellström made their live debut at the club Yaki-Da in their native hometown Gothenburg. This was followed by an intensive period of live appearances in Sweden's underground scene, often with other emerging artists at parties, arranged by Vice etc. including artists like Sad Boys (early project of Yung Lean). Vita Bergen was in discussions with several major labels but chose to sign a record deal with Woah Dad! Records (Estelle, Ron Wood etc.). On 22 October 2014 Vita Bergen released the self-titled EP "Vita Bergen" and toured with Swedish artists Markus Krunegård and Little Jinder. The following year, 2015, Vita Bergen released their debut full-length album "Disconnection", which was produced by William and recorded in a bedroom on a minimal budget, as requested by Vita Bergen. The cover illustration was made by Swedish artist Jens Fänge. The record was released in Scandinavia by Woah Dad! Records. Shortly after, the band signed a record deal in Europe with Glitterhouse Records now former affiliate of US label Sub Pop, and in March 2016 Disconnection was given a European release. The band followed up with extensive touring in Europe. The album went straight into the number one spot in the Swedish Vinyl and iTunes chart. Vita Bergen was nominated for Sweden's biggest music price P3 Gold, in the category "Pop of the Year" 2016.

Their second full-length album, entitled Retriever, was released on 2 June 2017 and recorded with a more prominent budget. The album was mainly written in Los Angeles. The main single "Under the Sun" premiered on Swedish radio on 30 May and was one of the most played tracks on Swedish radio that year. The release was followed by touring in Europe.

In late 2017, Vita Bergen did a global campaign with Google which took William on tour in Spain, the UK and France.

In 2019, William Hellström signed a deal with Warner Chappell Scandinavia/Woah Dad Records and presented a new phase for Vita Bergen, including collaborations with Swedish female artists such as Yoyo-Nasty and Pastelae.

In the Spring of 2019, Vita Bergen released the single Falcons and made their debut live appearances in Los Angeles and New York.

== Formation ==
Vita Bergen was initially formed by William Hellström and Robert Jallinder. They first played together at high-school in the center of Gothenburg and then continued on to University together. They were both students at Stockholm School of Economics, but weren't content with what they describe as the "conformity and cathedral atmosphere". They decided to quit their studies and relocate to their hometown Gothenburg, where the recruitment of band members began, consisting of mostly old schoolmates according to Hellström.

== Discography ==
Studio albums and EPs

- Vita Bergen EP (2014)
- Disconnection (Scandinavia) (2015)
- Disconnection (Europe) (2016)
- Retriever (2017)

Singles

- Curtains (2014)
- Disconnection (2015)
- Alexia (2015)
- In the City (2015)
- Closer Away (2015)
- Replace (2016)
- J (2016)
- Nixon (2017)
- Under the Sun (2017)
- Tänd Ljusen (2017)
- Falcons (2019)
