= Kärlekslåtar =

Studio album by Lorentz
- Released: June 11, 2014
- Genre: Hip hop, R&B
- Length: 50:34
- Label: Let's Make That Happen, Sony Music
- Producer: Lorentz Berger; Vittorio Grasso; Oskar Lowitz; Ruslow

Singles from Kärlekslåtar
- 1. "Visa mig vägen" Released: March 26, 2014; 2. "Allt från mig" Released: May 30, 2014

Kärlekslåtar is the solodebut studio album by the Swedish recording artist Lorentz. After two albums released with his younger brother, Sakarias Berger as the previously Grammis-awarded duo Lorentz & Sakarias, he debuted as a solo artist in 2014. The title Kärlekslåtar is Swedish for Love songs, the songs are written in Swedish, including some few terms and expressions in English. He got a Grammis award "Best HipHop/Soul of The Year", for his work of the album.

== Track listing ==
No.	Title	Writer(s)	Producer(s)	Length
1.	"Allt från mig"	Lorentz Berger; Vittorio Grasso; Oskar Lowitz	Lorentz Berger; Vittorio Grasso; Oskar Lowitz	5:14
2.	"Acqua di Losó"	Berger; Grasso; Lowitz	Berger; Grasso; Lowitz	3:10
3.	"Robyn Fenty"	Berger; Daniel Tjäder; M Joonsi	Berger; Grasso; Lowitz	3:52
4.	"The.OC.S01E01.DVD-Rip.Xvid (feat. Say Lou Lou)"	Berger; Grasso; Lowitz; M. Kilbey; E. Kilbey	Berger; Grasso; Lowitz	4:19
5.	"Där dit vinden kommer (feat. JaQe, Duvchi, jj and Joy)"	Berger; Duvchi; Joy; Grasso; Lowitz; Elin Kastlander; Joakim Benon; J. M'Batha	Berger; Ruslow; Grasso; Lowitz	4:53
6.	"Inga bra svar"	Berger; Grasso; Lowitz	Berger; Grasso; Lowitz	3:52
7.	"Houston (feat. Duvchi)"	Berger; Grasso; Lowitz	Berger; Grasso; Lowitz	4:55
8.	"Ingenting är för ingenting"	Berger; Grasso; Lowitz; Kalle Perlskog	Berger; Grasso; Lowitz	3:36
9.	"Mimosa (feat. jj)"	Berger; Grasso; Lowitz; Kastlander; Benon	Berger; Grasso; Lowitz	3:45
10.	"Mimosa del 2"	Berger; Grasso; Lowitz	Berger; Grasso; Lowitz	2:47
11.	"Visa mig vägen"	Berger; Hannes Netzell; Gustav Fagring	Berger; Grasso; Lowitz	3:17
12.	"Anata"	Berger; Grasso; Lowitz	Berger; Grasso; Lowitz	4:04
13.	"('-'*)"	Berger; Grasso; Lowitz	Berger; Grasso; Lowitz	2:50
Total length:				50:43
