= The Wknd =

Malaysian media company

The Wknd is a media company based in Kuala Lumpur, Malaysia, and produces music events and digital video content that focuses on Southeast Asian music.

== Founding ==
The Wknd was founded in 2008 by Fikri Fadzil, together with a team of volunteers from the Malaysian music scene. It started as a hobby and passion project, where the team got together on one weekend to record live music performances by Malaysian independent musicians - hence the moniker Wknd.

The series of music video content was named The Wknd Sessions, and has been one of the longest-running music series in Southeast Asia. The series has cemented The Wknd's place as a tastemaker, through new discoveries and early indie scene stars.

Since its inception, The Wknd has left an indelible mark on the regional music scene, establishing itself as the go-to source for those seeking out the freshest unsigned and independent music from Malaysia and Southeast Asia.

== Subject matter ==
The Wknd's central premise was about raising awareness on the undiscovered artists who, despite their lack of mainstream popularity, was actively pursuing a music career through small gigs and music showcases. Many of these artists were also releasing material, through DIY efforts and the limited access to Internet and the social media of the time (mainly Myspace).

While starting out predominantly covering the Malaysian independent music scene, The Wknd's focus has grown to cover other countries in Southeast Asia. Since its founding, they have also covered acts from Indonesia, Thailand, Singapore, Philippines, Hong Kong and Taiwan.

Despite this increase in regional coverage, The Wknd's primary music focus has remained consistent - covering little-known acts that have talent and potential.

The Wknd has also been called upon in the past to interview international acts that have toured to Malaysia. Some of the more prominent acts include Franz Ferdinand, Dune Rats, Deerhoof, Bo Ningen, Tonstartssbandht, Postiljonen, Mac Demarco and Ash.

== Music events ==
The Wknd has created and curated different music showcases, with a specific format and formula for each:

- Cross Border Showcase (2014, 2016): a touring music showcase series, where Southeast Asian artists are flown in to Malaysia and taken for a two-city tour over a span of 2–3 weeks
- Piring-piring (2015): a vinyl market with DJ sets, food stalls and local fashion
- Buka Panggung (2019): a one-day event that combines a music marketplace, talks and a music showcase by artists that have appeared on The Wknd's digital content and series

== Discoveries ==
Aside from The Wknd Sessions being seen by musicians as a way to get discovered, The Wknd is also responsible for directly unearthing raw talent through its The Wknd Recording Fund initiative. This is a talent discovery platform, where up-and-coming talent submit their material for consideration by The Wknd team. Together with its appointed panel of judges, composed of prominent figures in the Southeast Asian independent music scene, one winner is selected and is awarded a record deal. With this deal, The Wknd produces and releases a single for the winning artist.

Past winners of The Wknd Recording Fund are:

- 2013: The Venopian Solitude
- 2015: Orang Malaya

In later years, The Wknd has teamed up with Vans Malaysia to help organize a similar initiative, under the umbrella campaign of Vans Musicians Wanted. Past winners of this incarnation of The Wknd Recording Fund are:

- 2017: Lukarts
- 2018: Kapow
