= Little Jinder =

Swedish singer (born 1988)

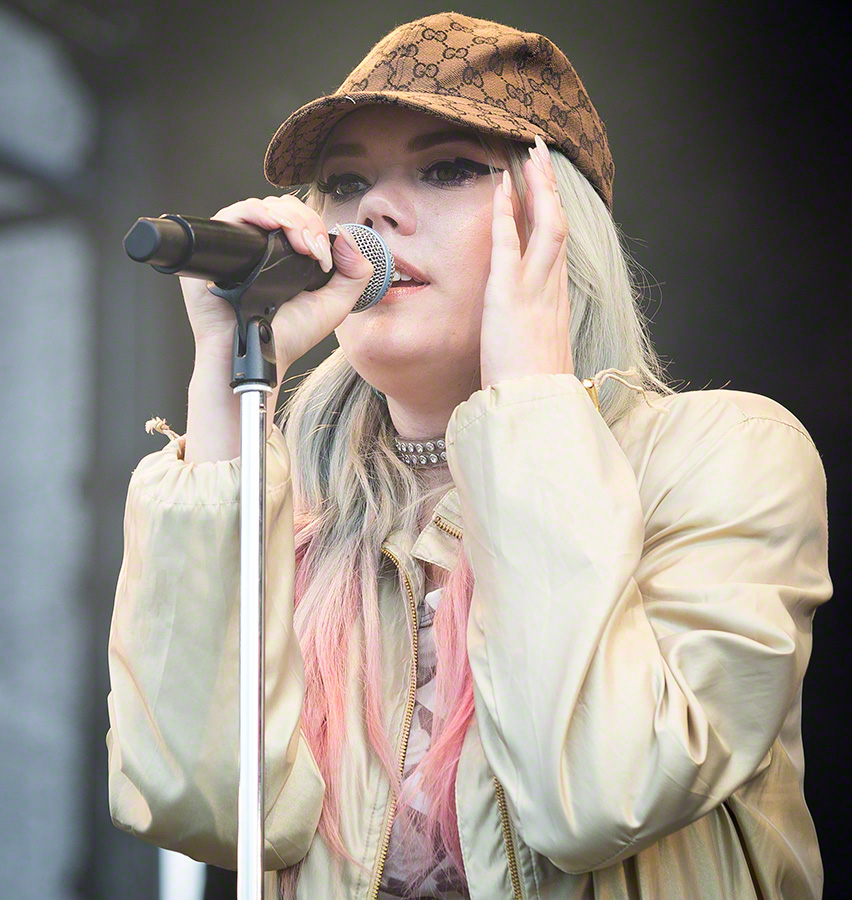
- Little Jinder in 2016.

Background information
- Born: Astrid Maria Josefine Stove; 20 February 1988 (age 38); Stockholm, Sweden
- Genres: Pop; synthpop; indie pop
- Occupations: Singer; songwriter; record producer
- Instrument: Vocals
- Years active: 2008–present
- Website: Warner Music Sweden

Astrid Maria Josefine Jinder (née Stove; born 20 February 1988), better known by her stage name Little Jinder, is a Swedish singer, songwriter, and record producer.

== Biography ==
She is the daughter of Björn Stove and Åsa Jinder. She lived in England and studied at the Liverpool Institute for Performing Arts.

=== Career ===
Little Jinder made her debut with the Polyhedron E.P. in August 2008, followed in March 2009 with the Youth Blood 12" EP – both of which were released by the US record label Trouble & Bass Recordings. She has also toured and played in both Europe and USA. In 2010, she was a panel member of the Sveriges Radio program Best i test. In 2011, she performed at the Winter Music Conference in Miami and Ultra Music Festival as well as Coachella.

Her debut music album was released on 22 May 2013 for Goldenbest Records, the same year she changed from recording and performing in English to Swedish when the music single "Shh" was released in November 2013. That music single was followed by the songs "Ful och tråkig tjej" and "Inga E som vi E". In the end of August 2014, she released her biggest hit single called "Vita Bergens klockor", a duet with Rebecca & Fiona. In November 2014 she released her first Swedish language music album called Little Jinder, and on 13 December 2014 she performed along with Julia Spada in Musikhjälpen with the song "Nåt e väldigt fel".

On 25 February 2015, Little Jinder won a Grammis-award for "Pop Singer of the Year". In the Summer of 2015 she released the single "Sommarnatt", and performed at several summer festivals. At Way Out West she was a guest star on stage during the performances from Rebecca & Fiona and as well as Zara Larsson. On 20 November 2015 she released the music single "Hångellåten" along with singer Mauro Scocco, which reached number 91 at the Sverigetopplistan.

On 14 January 2016, Little Jinder released her third album titled Allting suger which reached number 16 at the Sverigetopplistan. On 16 January she won Pop of the Year at the P3 Guld-gala. Jinder appeared on the cover of the music magazine Gaffa in its February issue of 2016. In March 2016, Little Jinder announced that she would appear in the seventh season of the TV4 show Så mycket bättre along with other known names in Swedish music. The season aired from October to December 2016. She participated in the show again in 2019, in a season where several past participants returned to the show.

== Discography ==
=== Albums ===
Year	Album	Peak positions
Year	Album	SWE
2013	Break Up	—
2014	Little Jinder	—
2016	Allting suger	16
2018	Hejdå	22

=== EPs ===
- 2008: Polyhedron E.P.
- 2009: Youth Blood (12" EP)
- 2011: Without You
- 2012: Keep on Dreaming

=== Singles ===
Year	Song	Peak positions	Album
Year	Song	SWE	Album
2015	"Hångellåten" (feat. Mauro Scocco)	91	
2016	"Du vill ha sex med mig"	40	
2016	"Freak"	100	
2017	"Kvicksand"	—	
2017	"Amy"	—	
2018	"Hålla handen" (featuring Lykke Li)	— (Note: "Hålla handen" did not enter the Sverigetopplistan singles chart, but peaked at number 10 on the Sverigetopplistan Heatseeker chart.)	
2018	"Goldwing" (featuring First Aid Kit)	— (Note: "Goldwing" did not enter the Sverigetopplistan singles chart, but peaked at number nine on the Sverigetopplistan Heatseeker chart.)	
2019	"Säg mig var du står"	70	
2021	"Sommartider hej!" (with Markus Krunegård)	— (Note: "Sommartider hej!" did not enter the Swedish Singles Chart, but peaked at number eight on the Swedish Heatseeker chart.)	Tutti frutti – från lokalen under sushin
2021	"Last Christmas"	— (Note: "Last Christmas" did not enter the Swedish Singles Chart, but peaked at number 12 on the Swedish Heatseeker chart.)	

Notes

Other singles

- 2009: "Young Blood"
- 2012: "Whatever 4Ever"
- 2013: "Shh"
- 2014: "Ful och tråkig tjej"
- 2014: "Vita Bergens klockor"
- 2014: "Inga E som vi E" (with Melo)
- 2015: "Random folk"
- 2015: "Sommarnatt"
