= Joel Borg =

Swedish PR strategist

Joel Borg (born 1983 in Sweden) is a Swedish PR strategist.

He co-founded Music magazine Denimzine (1998–2009) at the age of 14 and started working for Swedish booking agency Luger (Live Nation) in 2006. At Luger, Borg was one of the founders for festivals like Way Out West, Where The Action Is and Stockholm Music & Arts. He was also the front spokesperson for these festivals. Joel Borg has worked with artists like Lykke Li, First Aid Kit, Robyn, The Knife, Kanye West, Prince, HAIM, Neil Young, Alicia Keys, M.I.A, Patti Smith, Björk, Bon Iver, OFWGKTA and Kraftwerk.

Since 2014 Borg and his colleague Niklas Lundell runs the PR agency Borg & Lundell, with clients like Zlatan Ibrahimovich. and the label Woah Dad! which is a home to artists like Håkan Hellström.

== Interviews & Features ==
Freunde Von Freunden

Under The Radar Magazine

Stereogum

Kentucky Seven
