= Kite (band) =

Swedish synthpop band

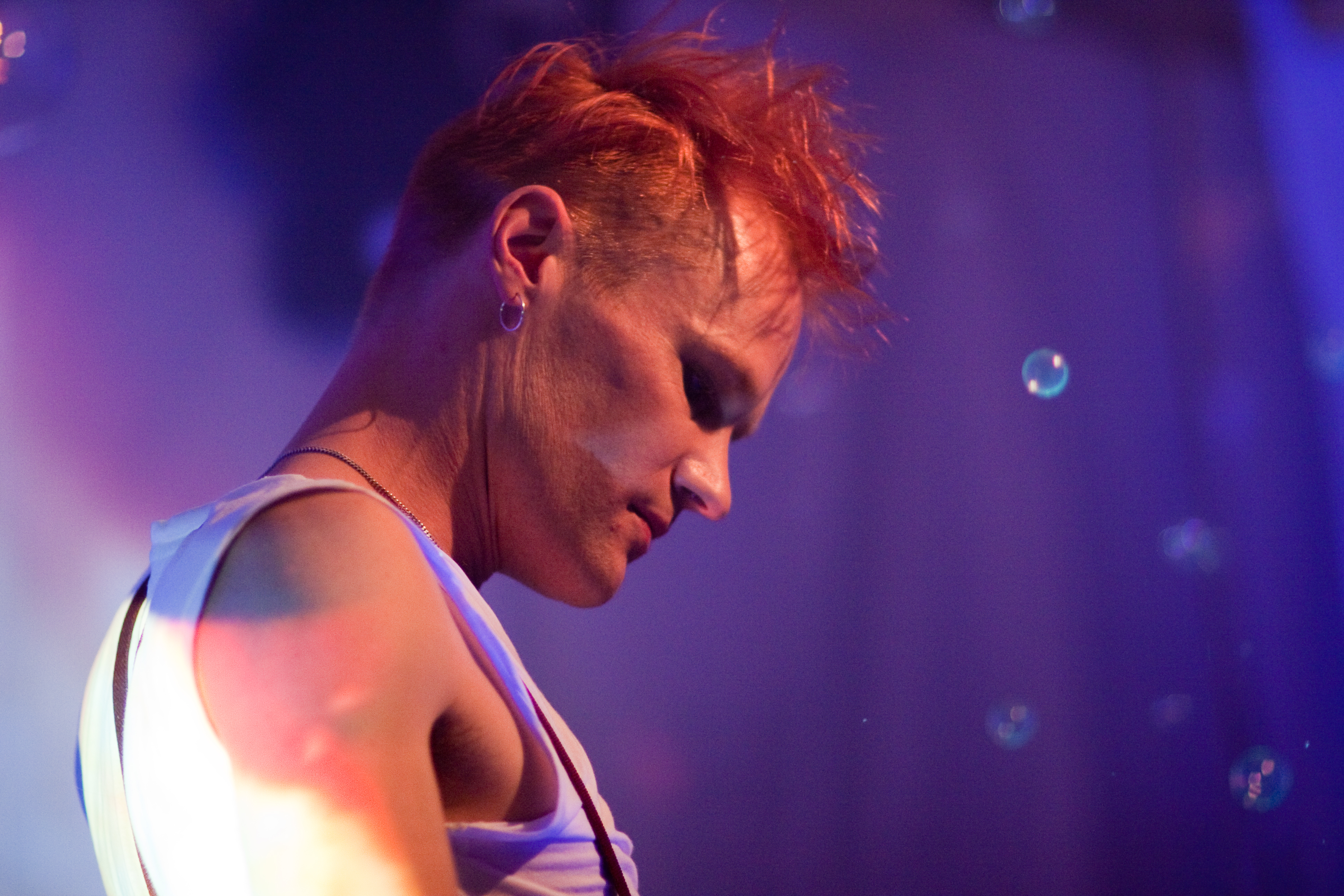
- Singer Nicklas Stenemo

Background information
- Origin: Malmö, Sweden
- Genres: Synth-pop, new wave
- Years active: 2008–present
- Label: Astronaut Recordings
- Members: Christian Berg; Nicklas Stenemo

Kite are a Swedish synth-pop group composed of Nicklas Stenemo (The Mo, Melody Club) and Christian Berg (Yvonne, Strip Music, The April Tears). Originating from Malmö and now based in Stockholm, they are signed to Astronaut Recordings and have published six EPs since their debut in 2008, each of which was released on CD and as a limited vinyl record edition. They have performed at festivals including Recession Festival in Århus, Denmark, Arvika Festival and Putte i parken in Sweden, Wave Gotik Treffen in Leipzig, and Amphi Festival in Cologne.

In 2020 they released new music with producer Benjamin John Powers.

== Reception ==
Their eponymous debut EP Kite was reviewed favorably by the Side-Line magazine comparing it to classic 1980s synth-pop acts such as Erasure or Yazoo, while the German Sonic Seducer noted singer Stenemo's distinctive voice. The EP Kite III was lauded for its original sound by Side-Line and Sonic Seducer, the latter marking a darker tone in this release. The release Kite IV has been seen as a mix of classic 1980s synth-pop similar to OMD and modern, experimental sounds. Kite's sixth EP VI was released in 2015. It has been compared to the sound of Kraftwerk and Vangelis.

The 2010 single "Jonny Boy" reached position 49 in the Swedish charts.

== Discography ==
=== Album ===
Title	Year	Peak chart position
Title	Year	SWE
Kite at the Royal Opera	2020	9
Kite VII	2024	5
Live at Dalhalla	2026	2

=== EPs ===
Title	Year	Peak chart positions
Title	Year	SWE
Kite	2008	—
Kite II	2009	58
Kite III	2010	—
Kite IV	2011	49
Kite V	2013	38
Kite VI	2015	—

=== Singles ===
Title	Year	Peak chart positions
Title	Year	SWE
"Jonny Boy"	2010	49
"Demons & Shame"	2017	—
"Tranås/Stenslanda"	2020	—
"Teenage Bliss" / "Bowie '95"	2020	—
"Hand Out the Drugs" / "Changing"	2020	—
"Panic Music" / "Bocelli"	2022	—
"Don't Take the Light Away"	2023	—

=== Appearances ===
- Sweat Boys "Endlessly" feat. Nicklas Stenemo of Kite (2019)
