= Gustaf Kjellvander =

Swedish singer-songwriter

- Born: 25 April 1980
- Died: 18 June 2011 (aged 31)
- Occupation: singer-songwriter
- Member of: The Fine Arts Showcase

Jan Gustaf Lennart Kjellvander (25 April 1980 – 18 June 2011) was a Swedish singer-songwriter. Before starting the Swedish outfit The Fine Arts Showcase he had two bands, Sideshow Bob and Songs of Soil (which also featured Gustaf's eldest brother Christian and future The Fine Arts Showcase Guitarist/Multi-instrumentalist Dan Englund).

Gustaf was born in Sweden but grew up outside of Seattle. After 10 years in the states his family returned to Sweden where Gustaf started writing music. He started his recording career fronting the cult band Sideshow Bob (1996–1998) before moving onto Songs of Soil (2000–2001) and finally The Fine Arts Showcase in 2003. Kjellvander made guest appearances on Scandinavian records by The Radio Dept., David & the Citizens, and Ossler. Gustaf spent 2005–2008 residing in east London before moving back to Malmö Sweden where he lived until his death. At the age of 31, he died suddenly in his sleep.

== Albums ==
- Invasive Confusion (1998)
- The Painted Trees of Ghostwood (2001)
- Gustaf Kjellvander Proudly Presents The Fine Arts Showcase and the Electric Pavilion (2004) (with The Fine Arts Showcase)
- Radiola (2006) (with The Fine Arts Showcase)
- The Fine Arts Showcase Sings the Rough Bunnies (2007) (with The Fine Arts Showcase)
- Friday on my Knees (2008)
- Dolophine Smile (2009) (with The Fine Arts Showcase)
