= The Wknd Sessions =

Malaysian music and talk show

- Genre: Music; Talk show
- Created by: Fikri Fadzil
- Directed by: Fikri Fadzil
- Country of origin: Malaysia
- Original languages: English; Malay
- No. of seasons: 11
- No. of episodes: 113

Production
- Executive producer: Fikri Fadzil
- Producers: Fikri Fadzil; Faiz Fadzil; Kenny Lee; Shaffiq Ahmad
- Production locations: Kuala Lumpur, Malaysia
- Running time: 15–30 minutes
- Production company: Bright Lights Production Sdn Bhd

Original release
- Network: YouTube (December 2008–present)
- Release: 1 August 2008 – present

The Wknd Sessions is a Malaysian music and talk show YouTube series created by Fikri Fadzil in 2008, featuring live music performances and interviews of artists from Southeast Asia.

The Wknd Sessions is often seen by artists in the Southeast Asian music scene as "a platform for them to gain greater prominence, and a vital avenue for artists to gain exposure to audiences they don't get to reach in live gigs". It is also noted for seeking out unique upcoming acts from Southeast Asia.

The show, its branding and digital assets are owned by The Wknd.

== History ==
Season 1, episode 1 of The Wknd Sessions aired on 14 December 2008. As of April 2019, a total of 11 seasons and 110 episodes have been produced. During this run, The Wknd Sessions has featured acts from Malaysia, Indonesia, Thailand, Singapore, Philippines, and Brunei across a diverse range of music genres, such as pop, punk, metalcore, alternative, singer-songwriters and spoken word.

The show is worked on by a core team of fixed personnel, with a revolving production cast. Participation on The Wknd Sessions was – and to a large extent, still is – voluntary in nature, worked on by a group of like-minded people with a common goal of advancing the music scene. This work ethic continues to be the defining principle of the show.

== Premise ==
Artist selection for The Wknd Sessions is done via the show's creative team, who act in a similar capacity as a traditional A&R executive role. As the team is predominantly made up of musicians and contributors to the Southeast Asian music scene, they constantly scout for talent by attending music shows. The team also relies on their extensive networks within the community to obtain word-of-mouth recommendations of noteworthy artists.

The Wknd Sessions also adheres to a strict principle of not allowing acts directly associated with its creative team members to appear on the show.

== Format ==
Each episode of The Wknd Sessions is broadcast via The Wknd's website (although the videos live on YouTube), and consists of a web article and writeup about the artist, three music performance videos and one interview video. All music performances are performed live – no overdubs are done – and recording is done in one take – meaning that any mistakes are included in the final output.

=== Pre-production ===
The Wknd's creative team spends approximately two to three months in pre-production. In this stage, the team collectively decides on the ten acts to be included in the season. The selection criteria are varied, and no formal rules are used. A combination of gut feel, together with data gathered from the team attending shows, is used to whittle down the list from an initial pool of 30–50 acts.

Early episodes (particularly in seasons 1 through 3) had minimal production consistency, due to the limited resources the team had. This necessarily meant that acts featured were predominantly acoustic-based and were mostly of the singer-songwriter types.

In later seasons, a form of curation was added into the pre-production process, to give a balanced view across many different genres, but still providing some form of dynamic across the ten episodes in the season.

=== Recording and post-production ===
Recording of the ten artists for each season is done over one weekend – with setup work happening on the Friday, and recording proper taking place on Saturday and Sunday. All thirty songs and ten interviews are recorded live back-to-back, with no audience present.

In the earlier seasons, the venue of the recording varied from episode to episode. A fixed venue was used from Season 3 onwards – typically any performance space that was available for booking – which gave the production more visual consistency.

Post-production typically takes anywhere from two to three months. The artist themselves have no creative input into the outcome, both in terms of the audio and video. This allows the show to produce a consistent and integrated audio-visual result.

=== Release ===
Each episode is released on The Wknd's website. The video itself is uploaded to The Wknd's YouTube channel.

Video releases are staggered across multiple days:

- Friday: the first music performance video is put up on the episode's page on the website, along with the interview video
- the following Monday: the second performance video is added to the episode page
- the following Wednesday: the third performance video is added

Audio from The Wknd Sessions is also made available on various streaming platforms like Spotify and Deezer, as well as online stores like iTunes.

== Episodes ==
As of 26 April 2019, there has been a total of 114 episodes released.

=== Season 1 ===
First aired in mid-December 2008, and featuring predominantly singer-songwriters from Malaysia. The interviews were hosted by Fahmi Fadzil. Notable artists that appeared in this season include Azmyl Yunor, Estrella, Couple, and Deepset.

=== Season 2 ===
Aired in 2009, featuring more acts from Malaysia. First appearance of the show's long-time interview host Ali Johan. Notable artists that appeared in this season include Bunkface, Khottal, Yuna and, Seven Collar T-shirt.

=== Season 3 ===
First aired on 5 February 2010, featuring artists from Malaysia. This was the first season that was shot in a "proper" performance space. Notable artists that appear in this season include monoloQue, Sphere, and Akta Angkasa.

=== Season 4 ===
First aired on 11 February 2011 with the interviews hosted by Ali Johan, who remains in this role from this point onwards. Notable artists appearing this season include The Impatient Sisters, Johny Comes Lately, and They Will Kill Us All.

=== Season 5 ===
First aired on 21 October 2011. Notable artists appearing this season include Pesawat and Man Under Zero Effort.

=== Season 6 ===
First aired on 18 May 2012. Notable artists appearing this season include Pitahati, Asmidar, and OJ Law.

=== Season 7 ===
First aired on 21 June 2013. Notable artists appearing this season include The Pilgrims, Plague of Happiness, Iqbal M, and The Fridays.

=== Season 8 ===
First aired on 8 November 2013. Entire season features Indonesian bands, for the first time. Notable artists appearing this season include MORFEM, Sigmun, Sore, Pandai Besi, and White Shoes & The Couples Company.

=== Season 9 ===
First aired on 13 June 2014. Notable artists appearing this season include The Venopian Solitude, Salammusik, Pastel Lite, and Tres Empre.

=== Season 10 ===
First aired on 16 October 2015, and also renamed (for one season only) to The Wknd Sessions Live. For the first time ever, the show was shot in front of a live audience, and featured 15 acts instead of 10. Notable artists appearing this season include Jaggfuzzbeats, Ramayan, Dirgahayu, Muck, and Najwa Mahiaddin.

=== Season 11 ===
First aired on 1 March 2019. The show returns after a three-year hiatus. Notable artists appearing this season include Tools of the Trade, Milo Dinosaur, LUST, and Gerhana Skacinta.
