= Loosegoats =

Swedish lo-fi rock group

- Origin: Lund, Skåne, Sweden
- Genres: Rock; Country; Lo-fi
- Years active: 1994–2001, 2009, 2012
- Labels: Startracks; Bad Taste Records

Loosegoats is a Swedish lo-fi rock group formed in 1994 by Christian Kjellvander, Johan Hansson, Jens Löwius and Mårten Löfvander. They released their first mini CD, Small Lesbian Baseball Players, in May 1995. Shortly thereafter Mårten left and got replaced by Anders Tingsek.

In 1996 Jens left the band. They replaced him with Magnus Melliander, who was first hired as a live-musician but quickly became a full-time member. The band released their debut album, For Sale by Owner the same year with that lineup.

The group disbanded in 2001.

They reunited in 2009 for three gigs and released a new album in 2012.

== Members ==
- Christian Kjellvander (Vocals, guitar)
- Anders Tingsek (Bass)
- Johan Hansson (Drums)
- Magnus Melliander (Guitar)

Former members:

- Jens Löwius (Vocals, guitar)
- Mårten Löfvander (bass)

== Discography ==
- 1995: Small Lesbian Baseball Players (Bad Taste Records)
- 1997: For Sale by Owner (Startracks)
- 1997: A Mexican Car in a Southern Field (Startracks)
- 1999: Plains, Plateaus and Mountains (Startracks)
- 2001: Her the city et al. (Startracks)
- 2012: Ideas for to Travel Down Death's Merry Road (Startracks)
