= Anders Hansson =

Anders Hansson may refer to:

- Anders Hansson (racewalker) (1992–2020), Swedish racewalker
- Anders Hansson (politician) (born 1976), Swedish politician
- Anders Hansson (born 1960), Swedish serial killer; see Malmö Östra hospital murders
