= Malmö Östra hospital murders =

Series of murders

- Location: 55.61107°N 13.05775°E; Simrisbanvägen 10, Malmö, Sweden
- Date: October 1978 – January 1979
- Target: Elderly hospital patients
- Attack type: Senicide
- Weapon: Disinfectant
- Deaths: 11 (Note: Hansson was convicted of 11 murders and 16 attempted murders. However, he was suspected of 16 murders and 11 attempted murders.)
- Injuries: 16
- Perpetrator: Anders Hansson
- Motive: Euthanasia debate (suspected); Felt sorry for old people (himself)
- Coroner: Gerhard Voigt
- Charges: Murder (16 counts); Attempted murder (11 counts)
- Verdict: Guilty
- Convictions: Murder (11 counts); Attempted murder (16 counts)

The Malmö Östra hospital murders were a Swedish case of serial senicide committed by the 18-year-old Anders Hansson at a hospital in Malmö between October 1978 and January 1979. Hansson poisoned elderly patients during his working hours as an orderly with the detergents Gevisol (contains sodium hydroxide; undiluted solution has a pH of 12) and Ivisol (contains potassium hydroxide; undiluted solution has a pH of 13).

At the long-term care part of the hospital, a total of 27 patients were poisoned to death, with at least 11 confirmed victims. Another 16 patients were also victims of attempted murder. In August 1979, Hansson was sentenced to closed psychiatric treatment, where he remained until 1994.
