= Elias (singer) =

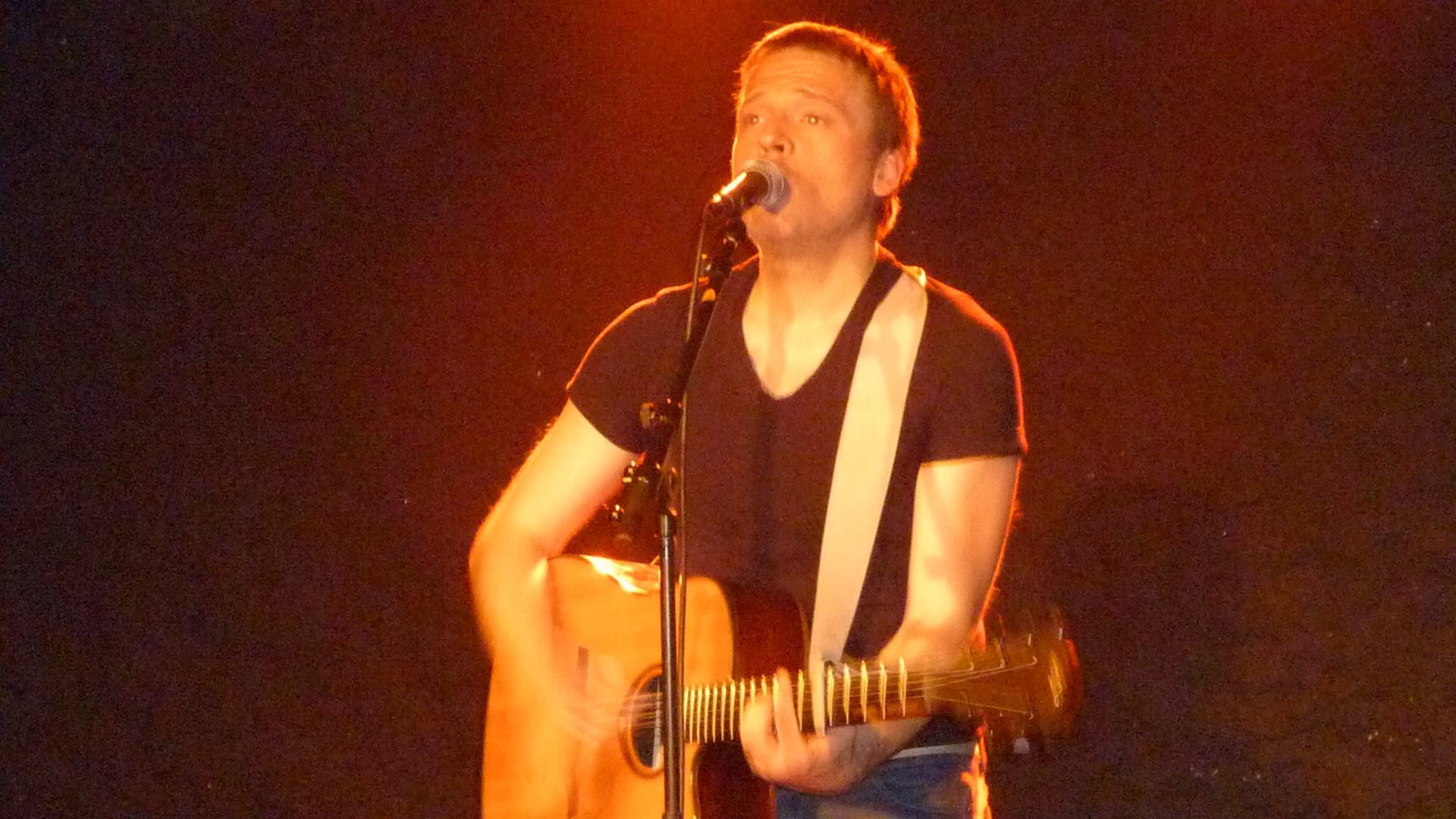
- Elias (2014)

Background information
- Born: 15 October 1980 (age 45); Bayonne, France
- Origin: France
- Genres: Chanson, French pop
- Labels: Akamusic, Universal

Elias (stage name) is born on 15 October 1980 in Bayonne. He is a French singer-songwriter.

== Biography ==
=== Beginnings ===
As an autodidact, Elias started piano and guitar in 1997. Then he got into Babylon, the French band, and gave more than a hundred public performances until 2000. For example, on 11 November 1999, he sang in Biarritz in opening of the Wailers.

In early 2000, he composed his own songs and writes, in particular, Rue des Souffrances, a song featured on his first LP. At this time, he met Maurice Vallet, who wrote with Julien Clerc, and he also wrote some texts for him.

=== Career as a songwriter ===
From 2003 to 2006, Elias composed some songs for other artists with many writers. He signed a contract with Free Demo, a publishing house in Paris (V.M.A group ) and then he started writing songs for French real T.V artists (Star Academy and Nouvelle Star).

Between 2007 and 2008 he took a professional break.

From 2009 on, Elias decided to sing his own songs; and wrote and composed most of the titles of his first LP.

=== LPs ===
In January 2010, Elias registered on Akamusic, the online crowdfunding site, to back financially a single for which they quickly got the budget.

During the summer 2010, via Akamusic, the same community site, Elias settled the financing of an album with 10 titles which were released in February 2012 (Des roses en hiver) This first LP is particularly made up of songs that he wrote himself. The other extracts were written by Laura Bismuth, Sabine Cardinal, Maurice Vallet and David Zana. Love is the recurrent theme – love of a woman, love of life or love of the other. The titles are often to the sound of banjo-guitar and the lyrics, optimistic, are in the true French music tradition of years 2000.

At the beginning of 2014, in order to record and to promote his 2nd LP; with 11 titles, he signed up on My Major Company, the crowdfunding site. If he is still composing musics, he makes sure of the support of many writers such as Sabine Cardinal, Iza Loris, Daria de Martynoff, Jacques Roure, Maurice Vallet, Christian Vié and François Welgryn. For this new LP, the pop with electro strains music had been largely influenced by Anglo-Saxon bands, such as Muse or Coldplay, that Elias had been listening to.

=== Main concerts ===
He sings in opening of some concerts : Helene Segara's in Toulouse on 19 October 2012, Stone's in Vatan on 9 September 2013; Didier Barbelivien's in Biarritz on 30 March 2014, with whom he sings A toutes les filles que j’ai aimées avant, in a duet in Bordeaux the day before, Amaury Vassili.

He also gave his own solo performances in Brussels on 25 February 2012 with Steve Linden in opening, at the Sentier des Halles in Paris on 24 May 2014 with Axel Saddier in opening and sange Rien d'important in a duet with Valentin Marceau (co-composed by Elias and Valentin Marceau.)

== Discography ==
=== Albums ===
- 2012 : Des roses en hiver
- 2014 : Un nouveau jour se lève

=== Singles ===
- 2011 : Changer les mots
- 2011 : La vie est belle

=== Contributions ===
- 2004 : Tout nous rappelle (Christian Vié / Elias - Christophe Balency), for Julien Laurence
- 2005 : L'air et le feu (Maidy Roth / Elias - Christophe Balency), for Michal
- 2005 : Seconde chance (Christian Vié / Elias - Christophe Balency), for Sous le soleil
- 2012 : Mon amour (Sabine Cardinal / Elias), for Steve Linden
- 2014 : Il faut toujours (Jean Tosit / Elias - Christophe Balency), for Jean Sébastien Lavoie

=== Participations ===
- 2013 : Nos mains, 1,2,3, Génération Goldman volume 2
