= Laakso (band) =

Swedish indie pop band

- Origin: Sweden
- Genres: indie pop
- Years active: 2003-present
- Labels: Adrian recordings
- Members: Markus Krunegård; David Nygård; Lars Skoglund; Mikael Fritz

Laakso is an indie pop band formed 2001 in Sweden. All their records have been produced by Jari Haapalainen.

== Discography ==
=== Studio albums ===
Title	Year	Peak chart position
Title	Year	SWE
I miss you - I'm pregnant	2003	—
My gods	2005	54
Mother Am I Good Looking?	2007	24
Mämmilä Rock	2007	—
Grateful Dead	2016	40
"—" denotes an album that did not chart.

=== EPs ===
- 2003: Long Beach EP
- 2004: Aussie Girl
- 2005: High Drama EP
- 2005: In My Blood EP
- 2007: Västerbron & Vampires

=== Singles ===
- 2003: Demon
- 2004: Laakso
- 2015: Time of My Life

== Members ==
- Markus Krunegård – vocals, guitar
- David Nygård – brass, accordion, synth, glocken, backing vocals
- Mikael Fritz – bass
- Lars Skoglund – drums, backing vocals
