= Christian Kjellvander =

Swedish singer-songwriter (born 1976)

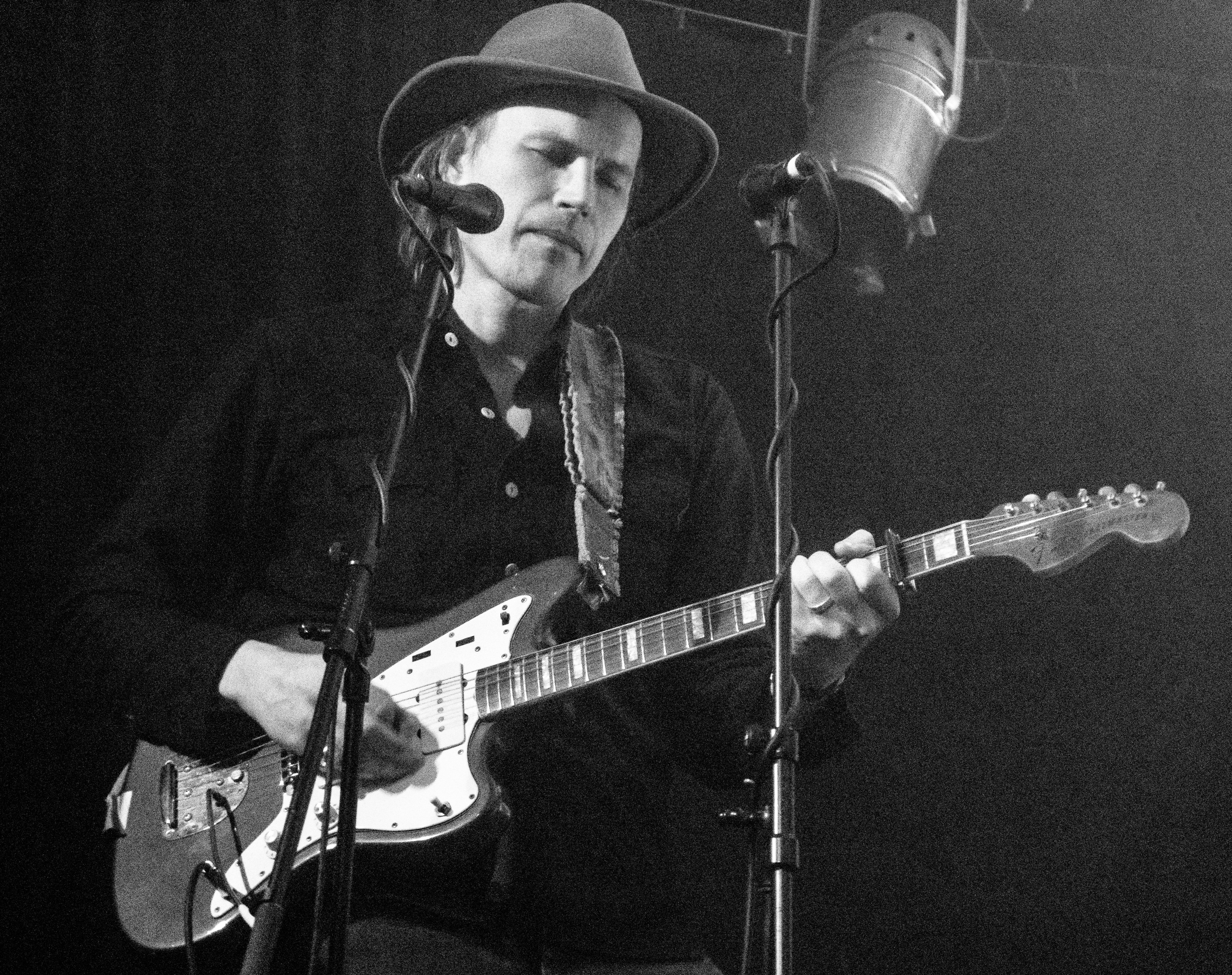
Christian Kjellvander (March 3, 2017, Vöcklabruck)

Christian Kjellvander (born May 13, 1976) is a Swedish singer-songwriter. As a solo artist he has released 11 studio albums so far.

== Early life ==
While born in Sweden, Kjellvander was raised Sweden and the US. Between the ages 6 to 15 he and his family resided in Seattle before returning.

== Career ==
Before going solo, he played in the alt country band Loosegoats. They released three studio albums and one EP collection, before parting ways in 2001. In the summer of 2000, Christian along with some band mates and brother, Gustaf Kjellvander, recorded "The Painted Trees of Ghostwood" under the name Songs of Soil. His brother passed away in 2011.

After the breakup of Loosegoats, Christian decided to go solo and after spending July 2002 in a studio in southern Sweden, Songs From A Two-Room Chapel was released in the autumn of the same year. The following 18 months Christian toured in Sweden and the rest of Scandinavia as well as Europe and a shorter US tour with The Cardigans.

In the summer of 2005, Christian returned to the studio with his band, Lazy Grace Frontier, to record the follow-up to the both critically and commercially successful solo debut. "Drunken Hands" was the first single from Christian's second solo effort Faya, released in late 2005. Kjellvander spent 2006 touring both with Lazy Grace Frontier and alone in Scandinavia and Europe.

In early 2007, it was announced on Christian's homepage that he would be supporting Logh on their European tour in April and May. During the summer of 2007, Kjellvander recorded his third solo effort at Mission Hall Studio. In mid-October, "Two Souls" was released as a single while the album I Saw Her From Here, I Saw Here From Her followed a month later.

In October 2016 the album A Village: Natural Light was released on Tapete Records. It was followed in November 2018 by Wild Hxmans.

== Discography ==
=== With Loosegoats ===
- Small Lesbian Baseball Players (EP, 1995)
- Mule Habit (EP, 1996)
- Country Crock (EP, 1996)
- For Sale By Owner (1997)
- A Mexican Car in the Southern Field (EP-collection, 1997)
- Disdialogic (EP, 1997)
- Plains, Plateaus and Mountains. Rivers, Lakes and Seas. (1999)
- Her, the City, Et Al. (2001)
- Ideas For To Travel Down Death's Merry Road. (2012)

=== With Songs of Soil ===
- The Painted Trees of Ghostwood (2000)

=== Solo albums ===
- Songs From a Two-Room Chapel (2002)
- Introducing the Past (2003)
- Faya (2005)
- I Saw Her From Here, I Saw Here From Her (2007)
- The Rough And Rynge (2010)
- The Pitcher (2013)
- A Village: Natural Light (2016)
- Wild Hxmans (2018)
- About Love And Loving Again (2020)
- Hold Your Love Still (2023)
- Ex Voto/The Silent Love (2025)

=== Other contributions ===
- Acoustic 07 (2007, V2 Records) – "Drunken Hands"
- Look to the West - West of Eden: backing vocals on Sweet Old Country (2016)
- Safe Crossing - West of Eden: vocals on Wrecker's Weather (2012)

== Equipment ==
- Fender Jazzmaster 66' (Lake Placid blue)
- Fender Jazzmaster 59' (Sunburst)
- Gibson SG 63'(Les Paul Custom)
- Fender Stratocaster 64 (Sunburst)
- Gibson Les Paul 52' 57' (Gold Top)
- Hermans Conde 78' (Media Luna Negra de Faustino Conde)
- Martin 000 (nylon string)
- Gibson ES 225 57' (Sunburst with Bigsby)
