= Roger Hansson =

Roger Hansson may refer to:

- Roger Hansson (ice hockey) (born 1967), Swedish ice hockey player
- Roger Hansson (sport shooter) (born 1970), Swedish sport shooter

== See also ==
- Roger Hanson (1827–1863), general in the Confederate States Army
- Roger L. Hanson (1925–2005), American businessman and politician
