= Jonas Lundqvist =

Swedish pop musician

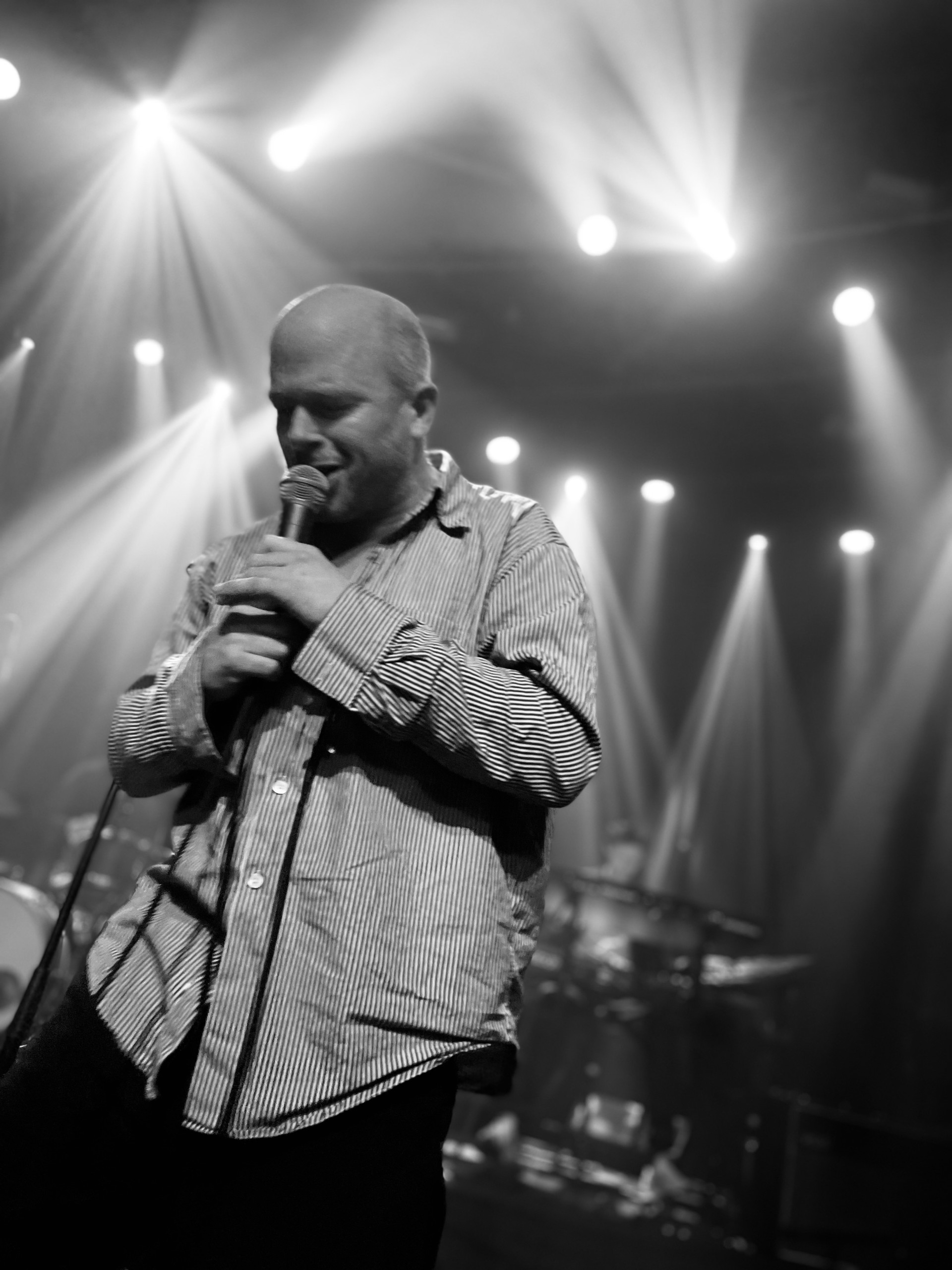
Lundqvist performing in 2024

Jonas Lundqvist (born 1980), briefly known as Jonas Game, is a Swedish pop musician. He played drums in the Gothenburg band Bad Cash Quartet before pursuing a solo career, having released seven albums.

== Biography ==
Lundqvist was born in 1980 in Härlanda, Gothenburg, Sweden, and grew up in the neighbourhood of Örgryte. He started the band Bad Cash Quartet at the age of 11. Bad Cash Quartet, a quintet, had Lundqvist as a drummer and also included Martin Elisson (later Hästpojken). They broke through in 1998 and released three albums.

Bad Cash Quartet split up in 2004. In 2007, Lundqvist released his first solo album, ADHD, as Jonas Game, singing in English. He continued in 2012 with the album Så e de me de, in Swedish and produced by Rasmus Hägg from Studio. In 2016, he released Vissa nätter, his third solo album. and then in the album Affärer in 2018. Bad Cash Quartet reunited in 2019 for one gig in 2019.

Dubbla fantasier was released in 2020, produced by Jocke Åhlund. Den okända floden was released in 2022, and Sorgetornets spejare, his seventh album was released in 2024. was nominated for a 2025 Grammis as "Rock of the Year", but Somliga av oss by Thåström won.

== Personal life ==
Lundqvist started a tennis club in Stockholm in 2011 together with Theodor Jensen of Broder Daniel. As of 2024, Lundqvist works as a tennis coach.
