= Florence Valentin =

Swedish pop-punk band

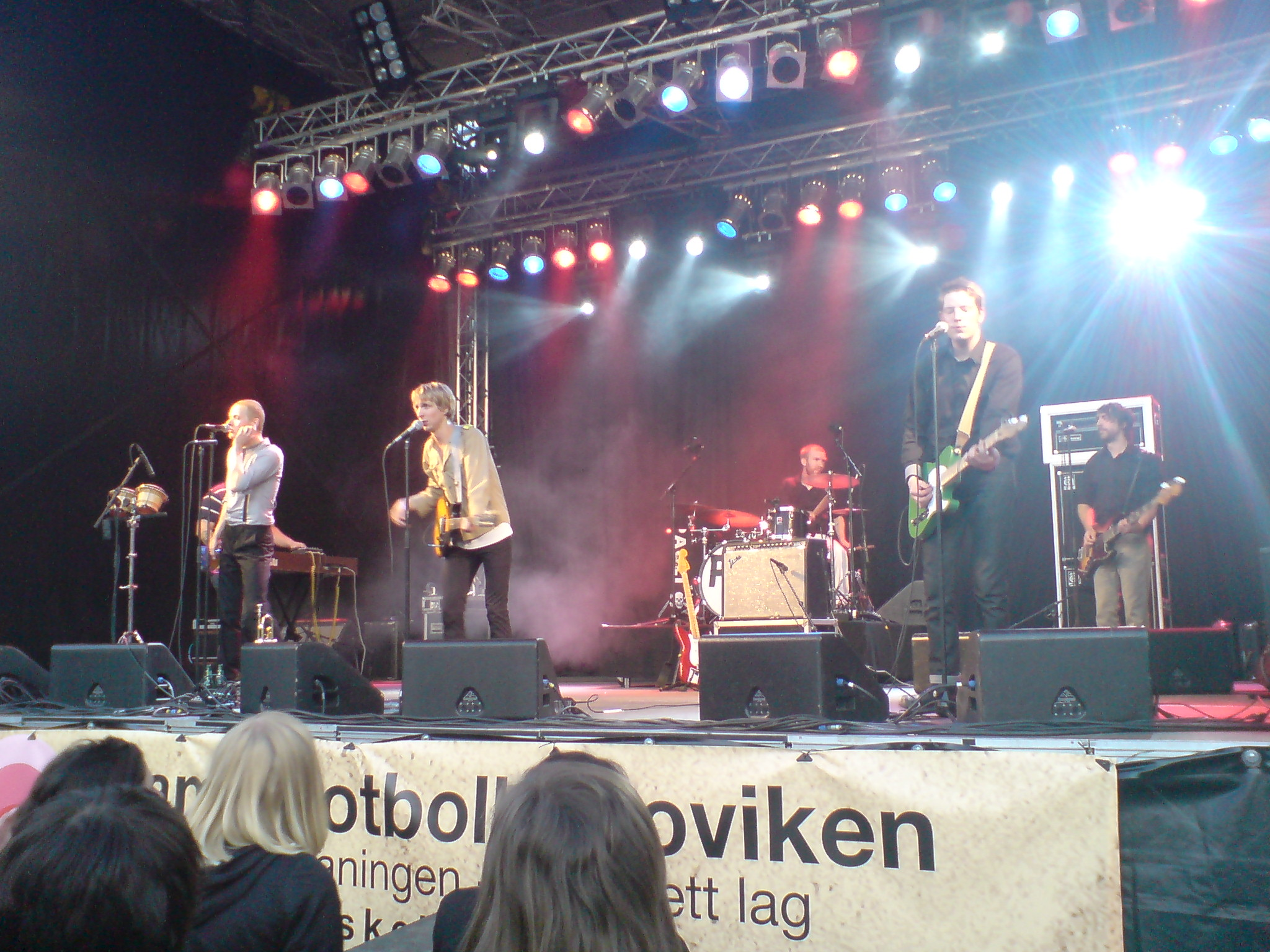
- Florence Valentin performing in 2008

Background information
- Origin: Stockholm, Sweden
- Genres: Indie pop; Indie rock; soul; punk rock
- Years active: 2002–2010, 2019
- Labels: MNW, Bonnier Amigo, Startracks
- Past members: Love Antell; August Berg; Daniel Kurba; Sebastian Ross; Magnus Jonsson; Jonny Calzone; Mats-Peter Krantz; Cezary Tomaszewski; Helena Gutarra; Therese Johansson

Florence Valentin was a Swedish pop-rock band from Stockholm. The band existed between 2002 and 2010. Both the lyrics and music to the band's tracks was made by the band's lead singer Love Antell. The band was founded in 2002 and got its breakthrough the year afterwards with the song "Allt dom bygger upp ska vi meja ner". For the general public Florence Valentin became known when the band performed the song at the late night talkshow Sen kväll med Luuk on TV4. Their first album "Johnny Drama" was released in 2004 by MNW's label Mistlur Records and distributed by Bonnier Amigo. The band's second album Pokerkväll i Vårby Gård was released in June 2007 by the record label Bonnier Amigo again. Florence Valentin performed at Allsång på Skansen which was broadcast on SVT with the song with the same name as their second album "Pokerkväll i Vårby Gård". On 25 March 2009 the band's third album Spring Ricco was released by the record label Startracks. They disbanded in 2010. but reunited announcing a national tour and released the single "Sanningen om mej".

The group's name comes from the scandal singer Johnny Bode. Florence Valentin was one of many pseudonyms Bode used during his career in the 1930s.

== Discography ==
=== Album ===
- 2004 – Johnny Drama (MNW/Bonnier Amigo)
- 2007 – Pokerkväll i Vårby Gård (Bonnier Amigo)
- 2009 – Spring Ricco (Startracks)

=== EP and singles ===
- 2003 – Allt dom bygger upp ska vi meja ner (EP) (MNW/Bonnier Amigo)
- 2004 – Där jag borde va (single) (Mistlur/MNW)
- 2004 – Hoy! Johnnyboy! (single) (Mistlur/MNW)
- 2006 – Klaraberg (single) (Motström)
- 2007 – Pokerkväll i Vårby Gård (single) (Mistlur/MNW/Bonnier Amigo)
- 2009 – Spring Ricco (single) (Startracks)
- 2019 – Sanningen om mej (single) (Playground Music)
