= Henry Hansson =

Norwegian resistance member (1918–1945)

Aksel Henry Hansson (23 July 1918 – 9 February 1945) was a Norwegian resistance member.

He was born in Kristiania as the son of Swedes Karl and Anna Hansson. He had a little sister Else Annelise (19 February 1923-) He went to middle school, commerce school and auditing courses, and worked as an auditor's assistant. 28 December 1938, Ida Sofie Borchgrevink dob. 19 May 1918, gave birth to his son Arne Hansson i Horten. In 1943 in Oslo he married Signy Leisegang, born 1916 in Durban. He was also an accomplished amateur boxer in the club Fagforeningenes IF av 1926.

During the occupation of Norway by Nazi Germany he joined the armed resistance group Milorg. He advanced from being team leader (troppssjef) via deputy company leader to district leader in 1943. He was arrested on 9 December 1944 and was imprisoned in Møllergata 19. Several of his team members were arrested as well. On 8 February 1945, when the Nazi police leader Karl Marthinsen was assassinated by the Norwegian resistance, it was decided to execute Hansson as a reprisal. He was transferred to Akershus Fortress. He was executed by gnushot on 9 February together with six of his team members, as well as two earlier arrestees including Asle Grepp. Both the court-martial which sentenced them and the firing squad consisted of Norwegians. Hansson's body was disposed of in the sea.
