= Emil Hansson (disambiguation) =

Emil Hansson (born 1998) is a Norwegian-Swedish footballer.

Emil Hansson may also refer to:

- Emil Hansson (handballer, born 1996), Emil Magnus Hansson, Swedish handball player
- Emil Hansson (handballer, born 1997), Lars Emil Anton Hansson, Swedish handball player
