= Love Antell =

Swedish-Finnish singer and artist (born 1980)

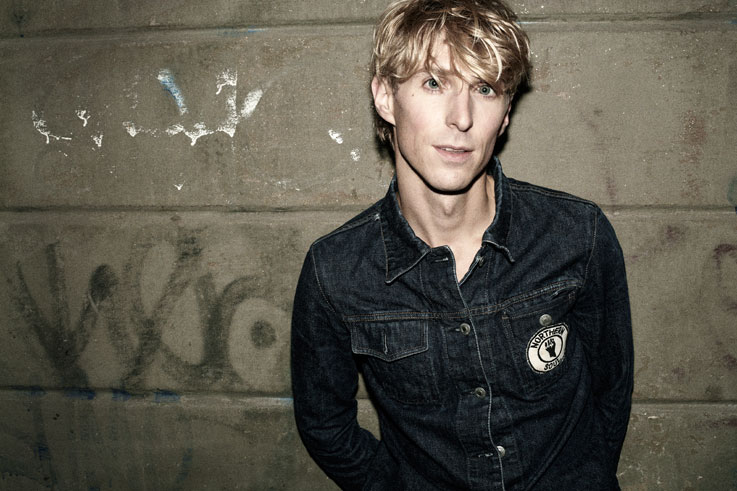
- Love Antell (2012)

Background information
- Born: Love Henrik Samuel Antell; 24 October 1980 (age 45); Stockholm, Sweden
- Origin: Stockholm, Sweden
- Genres: Pop; rock; indie pop; indie rock; folk rock; punk rock
- Occupations: Musician; songwriter
- Instruments: Vocals; guitar

Love Henrik Samuel Antell (born 24 October 1980) is a Swedish-Finnish singer and artist. As a student he attended Adolf Fredrik's Music School in Stockholm. Antell is known as the frontman of the band Florence Valentin, and as a solo singer. Antell's parents were both from Finland. He grew up in Östermalm in central Stockholm but nowadays resides in Hägersten. He was educated as an illustrator at Konstfack between 2001 and 2007, and he is inspired by Lars Hillersberg. Between 2007 and 2011, Antell was a guitarist in the folk-rock group Perssons Pack. He participated in Mika Ronkainen's drama documentary film "Ingen riktig finne"; the film won first prize in the category Best Nordic Documentary at the Gothenburg Film Festival in 2013.

As an artist, Love Antell has done the cover for author Lena Andersson's book "Duck City" and illustrated Michel Houellebecq's book "Plattform".

Antell was one of the singers in the 2014 season of the TV4 series Så mycket bättre.

== Discography ==
Title	Year	Peak chart positions
Title	Year	SWE
Gatorna tillhör oss	2012	—
Hitsville Haninge Samlade Spår 2003–2014	2014	—
Barn av Amerika	2015	30

=== Singles ===
Title	Year	Peak chart positions	Album
Title	Year	SWE	Album
"Stjärna där"	2012	—	Non-album singles
"Underhåll oss"	2014	—	Non-album singles
