= Sarah Klang =

Swedish singer and songwriter

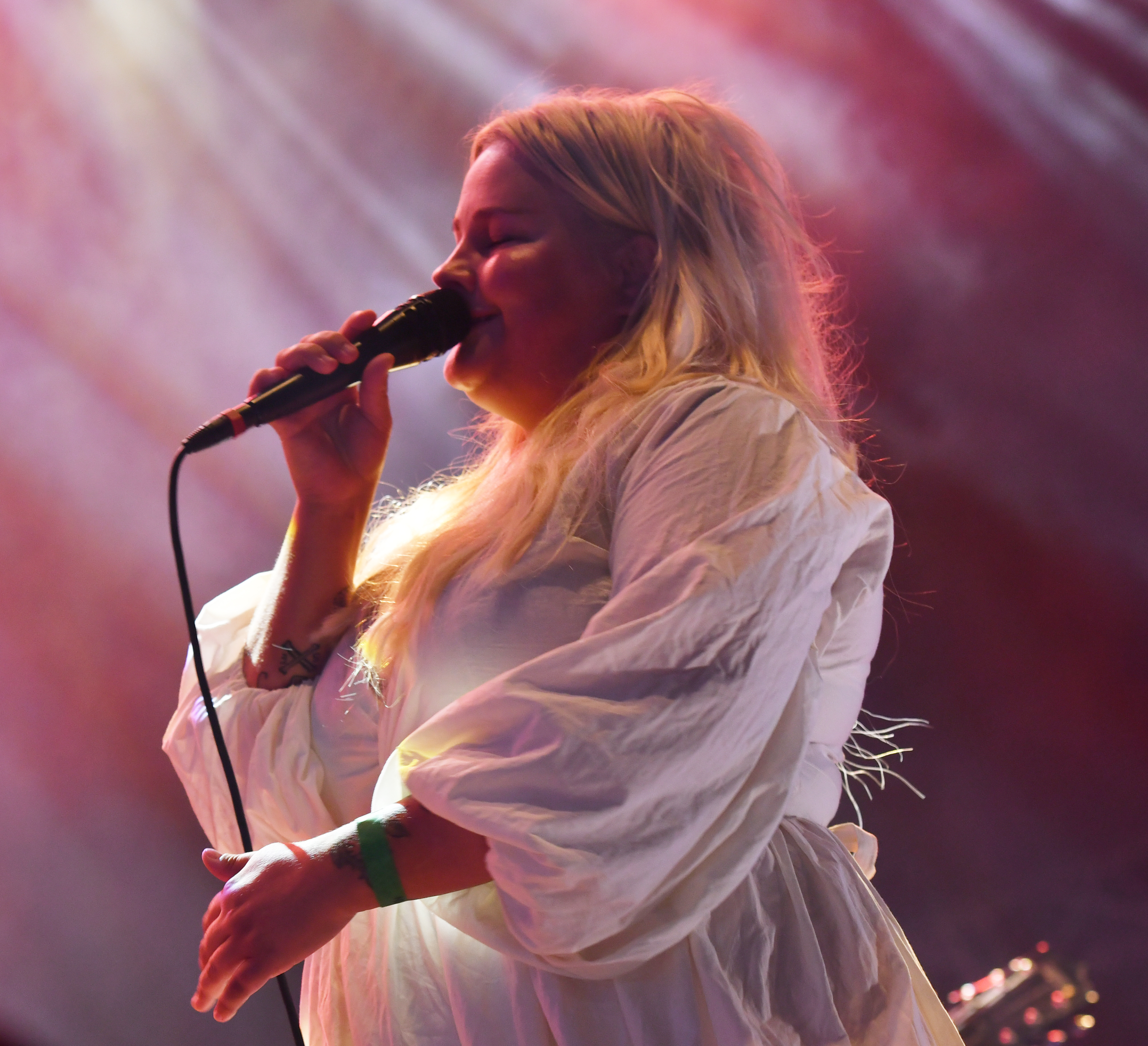
- Sarah Klang at Malmöfestivalen in 2018

Background information
- Born: Sarah Linnea Nova Klang; 26 August 1992 (age 34); Gothenburg, Sweden
- Years active: 2016–present

Sarah Linnea Nova Klang (born 26 August 1992) is a Swedish singer and songwriter. As of 2025, she has released five albums and performed on På spåret, and at the music festival South by Southwest. She is also a Grammis-award winner in the category "Alternative Pop of the Year".

== Biography ==
In high school Sarah Klang performed with an electronica band inspired by Coldplay and Sigur Rós. When she graduated from Uddevalla she stopped performing, but started again in 2016. In the summer of 2016, she released the music single "Sleep", then released the album Love In the Milky Way in 2018. She co-wrote the album with Kevin Andersson who was also a producer.

In 2018 she performed on the SVT show På spåret, was nominated in the Newcomer of the Year category at the Grammis-gala, and performed at South by Southwest in the U.S. At the Grammis-gala in 2019 she won in the category "Alternative Pop of the Year".

She describes her own music as pop with influences of Americana music and country.

Besides music she has also worked part-time at her father's Smørrebrød-restaurant.

Her album "Creamy Blue" has been nominated for IMPALA's European Independent Album of the Year Award (2019).

== Discography ==
=== Albums ===
Title	Year	Peak chart positions
Title	Year	SWE
Love in the Milky Way	2018	1
Creamy Blue	2019	4
Virgo	2021	3
Mercedes	2023	7
Beautiful Woman	2025	18

=== Singles ===
- 2016: "Sleep"
- From Love in the Milky Way
  - 2017: "Strangers"
  - 2017: "Left Me on Fire"
  - 2017: "Lover"
  - 2018: "Mind"
- From Creamy Blue
  - 2019: "Call Me"
  - 2019: "Endless Sadness"
  - 2019: "New Day Coming"
  - 2019: "Creamy Blue"
  - 2019: "It's Been Heaving Knowing You"
- From Virgo
  - 2020: "Canyon"
  - 2020: "Girls"
  - 2021: "Fever Dream"
  - 2021: "Anywhere"
  - 2021: "Love So Cruel"
- 2021: "Agony"
- 2022: "Scorpio"
- From Mercedes
  - 2022: "Belly Shots"
  - 2023: "Mercedes"
  - 2023: "Magic Stone"
  - 2023: "Halloween Costume"
  - 2023: "Worst Mom"
- 2023: "Hurts Me Too"
- 2024: "Strange"
- From Beautiful Woman
  - 2024: "Beautiful Woman"
  - 2024: "Last Forever"
  - 2024: "Other Girls"
  - 2024: "Go to the Sun"
  - 2025: "Childhood"
