= Åke Hansson =

Åke Hansson may refer to:

- Åke Hansson (footballer, born 1903) (1903–1981), Swedish footballer for IFK Göteborg
- Åke Hansson (footballer, born 1927) (1927–2015), Swedish footballer for Malmö FF
