= Lorentz (rapper) =

- Also known as: Loso; Losobaby; Lorrelight; Lorre
- Born: Lorentz Johannes Alexander Berger; 28 July 1991 (age 35)
- Origin: Stockholm, Sweden
- Genre: Hip hop
- Occupations: Rapper; singer
- Instrument: Vocals
- Years active: 2007-
- Label: Let's Make That Happen
- Website: itslorentz.com

Lorentz Johannes Alexander Berger (born 28 July 1991), who uses his given name Lorentz as a stage name, is a rap artist from Stockholm, Sweden, rapping in Swedish.

Raised on Södermalm, Stockholm, he became part of the Grammis winning duo Lorentz & Sakarias together with his brother Sakarias Berger. He has also collaborated with jj, Say Lou Lou, JaQe, Duvchi, Joy. In 2014 he made his solo-debut and released his album Kärlekslåtar which he won a Grammis for Best HipHop/Soul of The Year.

On 16 June 2017, Lorentz released his second album, Lycka Till.

On 15 May 2020, Lorentz released his third album, Krig och Fred.

== Discography ==
=== Albums ===
List of studio albums, with selected chart positions, sales figures and certifications
Title	Album details	Peak chart positions
Title	Album details	SWE
Kärlekslåtar	Label: Sony Music; Released: 4 July 2014; Formats: LP, CD	22
Lycka Till	Label: Sony Music; Released: 16 June 2017; Formats: LP, CD	5
Krig och fred	Label: Sony Music; Released: 15 May 2020; Formats: digital download, streaming	26
