= Markus Krunegård =

Swedish-Finnish singer and songwriter (born 1979)

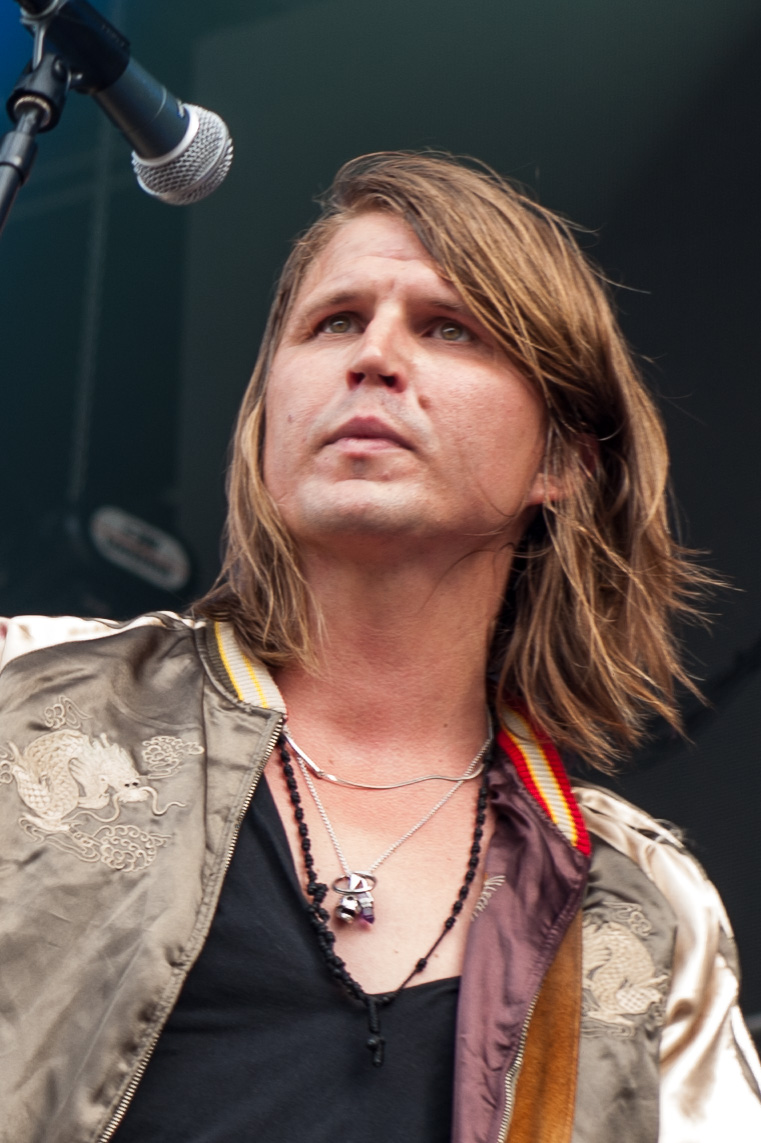
- Markus Krunegård at Way Out West, August 2014

Background information
- Born: 6 April 1979 (age 47); Norrköping, Sweden
- Genres: Pop, indie, rock
- Occupations: Singer, songwriter, musician
- Instruments: Vocals, guitar
- Years active: 2001 – present
- Website: markuskrunegard.se

Markus Krunegård (born 6 April 1979 in Norrköping, Östergötland, Sweden) is a Swedish singer and songwriter.

== Career ==
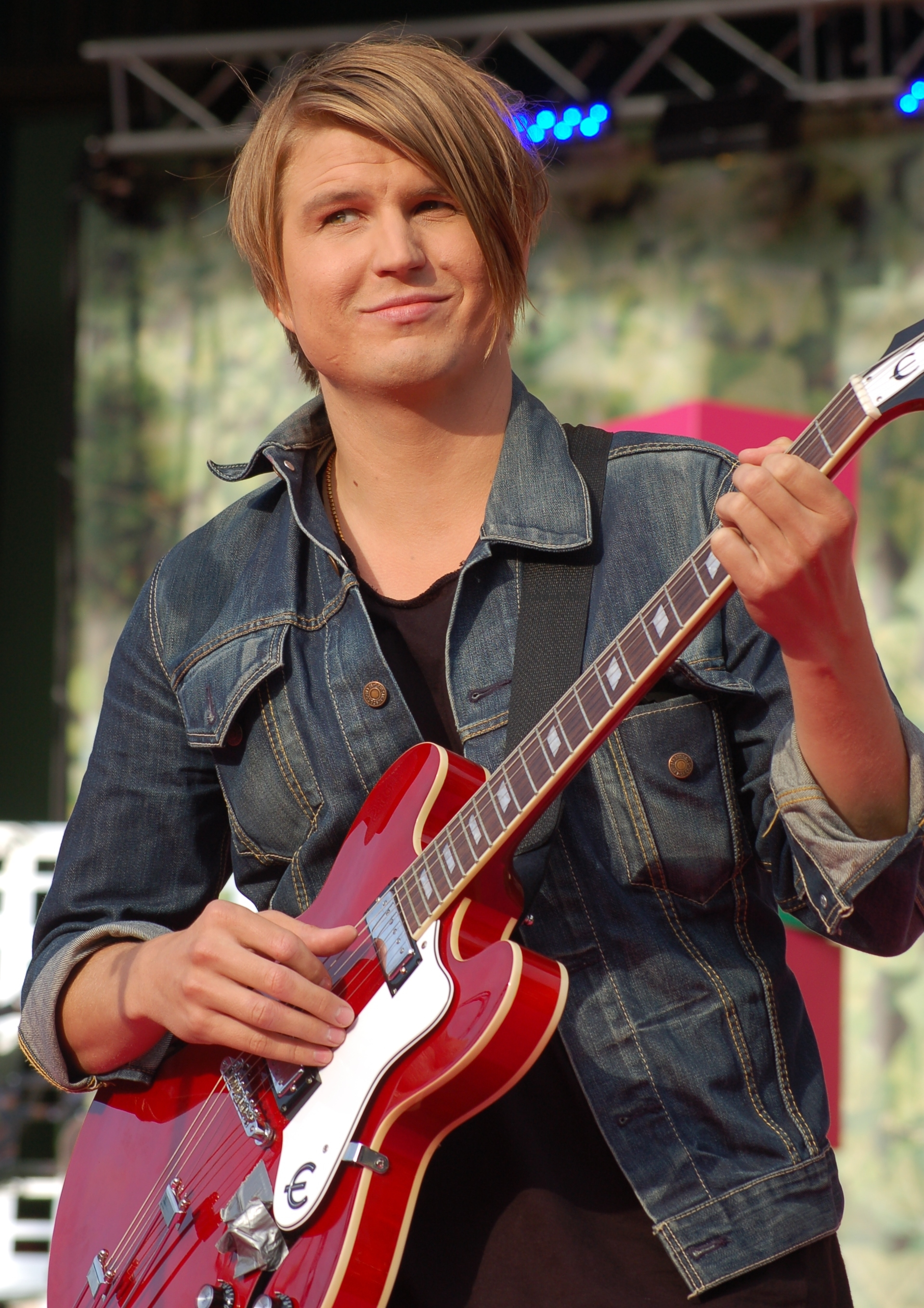
Markus Krunegård in 2010

On 2 April 2008 he released his solo album 'Markusevangeliet', with the debut single "Jag är en vampyr" made it to the Top 5 on Sverigetopplistan. The same year he appeared on albums by Annika Norlin, Johnossi and Eldkvarn. He also toured with Lars Winnerbäck in summer of 2008 followed by an extensive solo tour. He was nominated for several awards including Rockbjörnen, Grammisgalan and P3 Guld.

He followed by releases of Prinsen av Peking and Lev som en gris, dö som en hund in 2009. His album Mänsklig värme released on 28 March 2012 entered the Swedish Albums Chart straight at No. 1 making it his biggest success ever.

== Other projects ==
Pello Revolvers

Pello Revolvers is a band formed by songwriter Hans-Erik Kangasharju, which includes Hans-Erik Kangasharju (acoustic guitar, electric guitar, vocals), Tobias Henriksson (drummer, carillon, mandolin, vocals), Johan Sammelin (electric and bass guitar, melodica, drum machine, synthesizer, producer), Robert Arlinder (electric and bass guitar), Markus Krunegård (bass and electric guitar, backing vocals), Ralf Rotmalm (bass, synthesizer), Anna Edemo (violin, backing vocals) and David Nygård (trombone, accordion, backing vocals, carillon, percussion).

Pello Revolvers formed in 2001 and signed to Massive Decline of Power Against Recordings. They released the self-titled Pello Revolvers in 2003, Borg Mesch in 2004 and No Spare Tyres in 2005.

P3 Live

Between January 2008 and August 2009, Krunegård hosted the radio show P3 Live at Sveriges Radio P3.

Laakso (2001–2007)

Besides his solo career, he is also a member of the Swedish indie band Laakso, with the other members being David Nygård, Lars Skoglund and Mikael Fritz. The band has released four albums; I Miss You I'm Pregnant in 2003, My Gods in 2005, as well as Mother am I Good Looking? and Mämmilärock, both in 2007. Their fifth album, titled Grateful Dead is set to be released on 22 April 2016. They have also released the EPs BALE, Long Beach, Aussie Girl, High Drama and Västerbron & Vampires, as well as two standalone singles; Demon in 2003, and Laakso in 2004.

Hets (2006–2007)

Krunegård has also been a member of the defunct supergroup Hets with Henrik Svensson (from Doktor Kosmos), Christoffer Roth (from De Lyckliga Kompisarna (DLK) and Monster) and Per Nordmark (from Fireside). The short-lived project was formed in 2006 and disbanded in 2007. They released one self-titled album on their own record label Etikett: Hets. Their song "Hasses brorsas låtsassyrras kompis fest" was used as main theme for the Swedish young adult TV-show "Hasses brorsas låtsassyrras kompis", aired 2007–2008 on SVT.

Serenades (2011)

In April 2011, he announced the forming of the duo Serenades together with Adam Olenius from Shout Out Louds. Their first release was the EP Birds, released on 18 April 2011.

== Personal life ==
Krunegård grew up in Röda Stan, a neighborhood of Norrköping and studied at the local Hagagymnasiet Haga School in Norrköping. Krunegård is a Sweden-Finn: he has roots in Pello in the Finnish Torne Valley on the Swedish-Finnish border on his mother's side. Krunegård is married and has one daughter born in 2011.

== Discography ==
=== Albums ===
Title	Details	Peak chart positions	Certification
Title	Details	SWE	Certification
Markusevangeliet	Released: 2 April 2008; Label: Universal	10	
Prinsen av Peking	Released: 14 October 2009; Label: Universal	9	
Lev som en gris, dö som en hund	Released: 14 October 2009; Label: Universal	11	
Mänsklig värme	Released: 2 April 2012; Label: Universal	1	
Rastlöst blod	Released: June 2014; Label: Universal	5	
Härskarens Teknik	Released: January 2015; Label: Universal	20	
I huvet på en idiot, i en bar, på en ö, i ett hav, på en ö, i en bar, i huvet på en idiot	Released: 7 September 2018; Label: Ojoy	2	
Tutti Frutti – Från lokalen under sushin	Released: 28 May 2021; Label: Universal	13	
Kemtvätten	Released: 5 November 2021; Label: Universal	40	
Bastard	Released: 7 February 2025; Label: Sonet, Universal	28	

=== EPs ===
- 2009: Lead Singer Syndrome EP

=== Singles ===
- 2008: "Jag är en vampyr"
- 2008: "Det är ett idogt jobb att driva ungdomen ut ur sin kropp"
- 2009: "Hela livet var ett disco"
- 2009: "Hollywood Hills"
- 2010: "Lev som en gris dö som en hund"
- 2012: "Everybody Hurts"
- 2012: "Askan är den bästa jorden"
- 2014: "Du stör dig hårt på mig"
- 2014: "Let's go nu är jag din yo"

== Awards ==
Year	Nominated work	Category	Award	Result	Notes	Ref.
2009	Jag är en Vampyr	Song of the Year	P3 Guld	Won	Notes	
2009	Markusevangeliet	Artist of the Year	P3 Guld	Nominated	Notes	
2009	Markusevangeliet	Pop Artist (Male) of the Year	Grammis	Nominated	Notes	
2009	Markusevangeliet	New Artist of the Year	Grammis	Nominated	Notes	
2009	Jag är en Vampyr	Song of the Year	Grammis	Nominated	Notes	
2009	Markusevangeliet	New Artist of the Year	Rockbjörnen	Nominated	Notes	
2009	Markusevangeliet	Pop Artist (Male) of the Year	Rockbjörnen	Nominated	Notes	
2009	Jag är en Vampyr	Song of the Year	Rockbjörnen	Nominated	Notes	
2012	-	Swedish Live artist of the Year	GAFFA-Priset	Won	Notes	
2013	Mänsklig Värme	Album of the Year	Grammis	Nominated	Notes	
2013	Mänsklig Värme	Producer of the Year	Grammis	Nominated	Co-produced with Lars Skoglund	
2014	-	Swedish Live artist of the Year	GAFFA-Priset	Won	Notes	
