= Postiljonen =

Swedish musical band

- Origin: Stockholm, Sweden
- Genre: Dream pop
- Years active: 2011–present
- Labels: Hybris, Best Fit Recordings
- Members: Mia Bøe; Daniel Sjörs; Joel Nyström Holm

Postiljonen is a dream pop band from Stockholm, Sweden, formed in 2011 by Mia Bøe (Norwegian), Joel Nostrum Holm (Swedish), and Daniel Sjörs (Swedish). The group has released two albums, Skyer and Reverie, and one remix EP titled All That We Had Is Lost. In addition to original lyrics, the band incorporates sound bites from a variety of films, including The Princess Bride and Breakfast at Tiffany's.

Postiljonen has managed to create a characteristic sound, where ethereal and alluring vocals are interwoven in a mystical, ambient, dreamy and lovable expression. The band has been compared to artists including OMD, M83, The Naked and Famous, Sigur Rós, JJ and Cocteau Twins. The group describes themselves as nostalgic dreamers.

== Discography ==
- Skyer (2013)
- All That We Had Is Lost (2014)
- Reverie (Feb 19, 2016)
