= Johan Hansson =

Swedish floorball player

Johan Rosenströmer (née Johan Hansson) (born 28 May 1979 in Varberg, Sweden) is a retired floorball player.

Hansson played for Swedish club Warberg IC between 1999 and 2003. During his time at the club he won two silver medals in the Swedish Championship (2001 and 2003). In 2003 he left Warberg IC and signed with Capricorn IBC, a fourth-league team, the same club that he played with before signing with Warberg in 1999.
