= Lorentz & Sakarias =

Swedish hip hop duo

- Origin: Stockholm, Sweden
- Years active: 2007 - present
- Labels: Baseline Music
- Members: Lorentz Berger; Sakarias Berger
- Website: lorentzsakarias.com

Lorentz & Sakarias is a hip-hop duo from Stockholm, Sweden consisting of Lorentz Berger and Sakarias Berger. In their career, they have released two full-length albums. They have collaborated with Jan Johnston, Duvchi, and Newkid Their single "Mayhem", released in 2009, peaked at number 31 on the Swedish single chart.

== Discography ==
- 2009: Vi mot världen
- 2012: Himlen är som mörkast när stjärnorna lyser starkast
