= Henric de la Cour =

Swedish songwriter, musician and singer

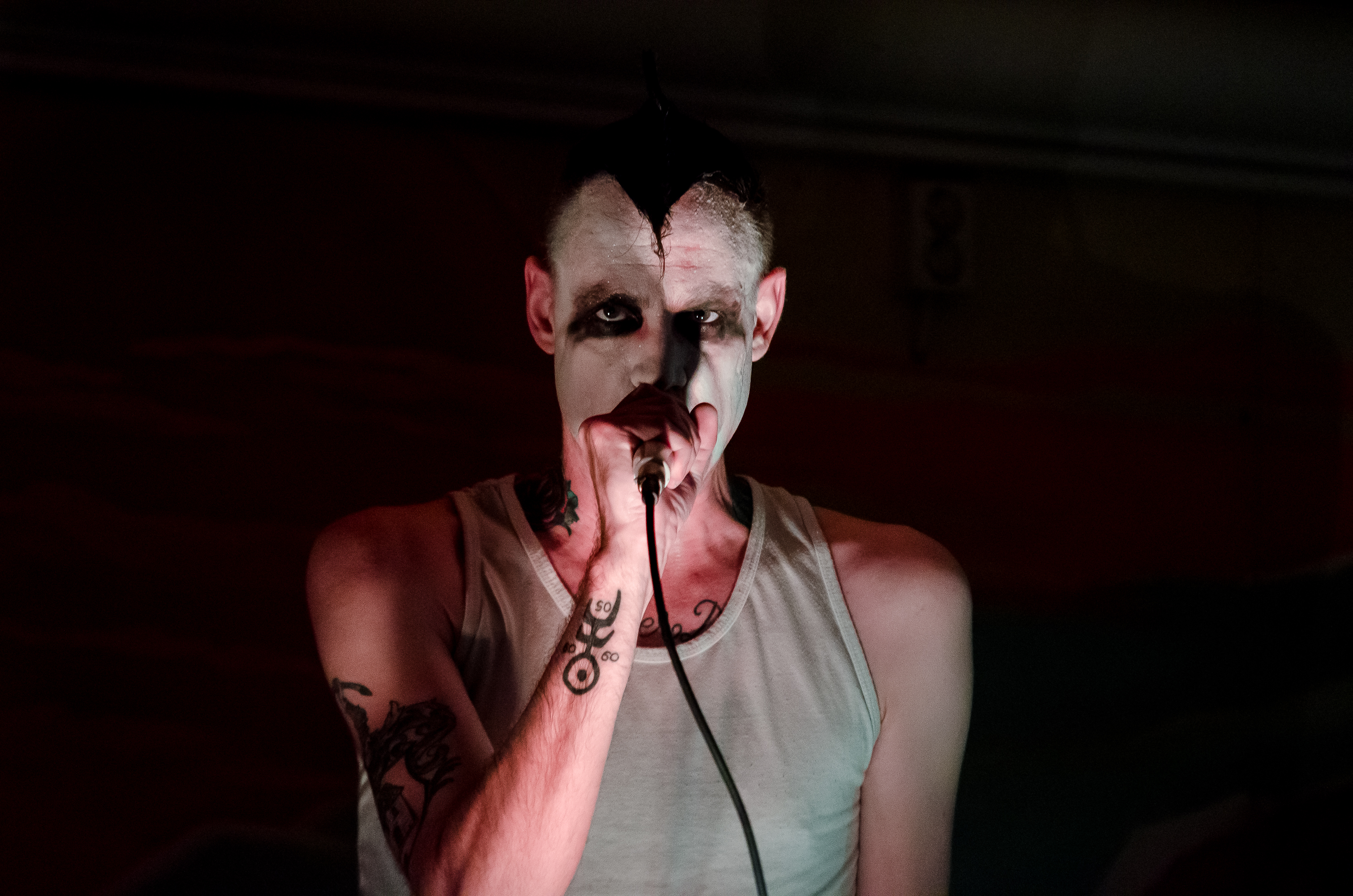
- De la Cour performing live at the Kalabalik på Tyrolen festival in August 2012.

Background information
- Born: Paul Henric Dornonville de La Cour; 8 October 1974 (age 51)
- Origin: Eskilstuna, Sweden
- Occupations: Singer, songwriter, record producer, musician
- Instrument: Vocals
- Years active: 1993–present

Henric de la Cour (born Paul Henric Dornonville de La Cour in Eskilstuna on 8 October 1974) is a Swedish songwriter, musician and singer rose to prominence as the vocalist of gothic and alternative rock bands Yvonne and Strip Music before launching a successful solo career.

== Yvonne ==
Henric de la Cour started his musical career as the lead vocal in the Swedish group Yvonne, formed in 1993. The six-piece band consisted of Henric de la Cour (vocals), David Lindh (guitar), Tobias Holmberg and Rikard Lindh (synthesizers), Christian Berg (bass), and Niklas Jonsson (drums). Strip Music traveled internationally and performed in England, The Netherlands, Norway, Denmark, Finland and Ukraine. In 2009, the group was put on hold as Henric de la Cour turned his attention to other projects. The band was active from 1993 until February 2002, officially disbanding in 2003. During their decade-long career, Yvonne released four studio albums and numerous singles, becoming pioneers of the 1990s Swedish new wave and gothic-inspired pop scene.

For Swedish language page of group, see Yvonne (musikgrupp).

== Strip Music ==
Following Yvonne's dissolution, Henric de la Cour and guitarist David Lindh formed Strip Music in 2003 made up of Henric de la Cour (vocals), David Lindh (guitar), Christian Berg and Jens Hellqvist (synthesizers), Valdemar Asp (bass) and Richard Ankers (drums). The band was put on hold in 2009 after releasing two albums, as Henric de la Cour turned his attention to other projects.

For Swedish language page of group, see Strip Music.

== Solo ==
Henric de la Cour continued his musical career following Strip Music's hiatus. He was featured on the album "Snow" by the prominent electronica producer Andreas Tilliander. He subsequently lent his vocals to 'Bad Hands', the solo project of Per Nordmark, drummer of the Swedish rock band Fireside. In addition to his recording work, he performed as a DJ and portrayed Jack Skellington in a Swedish musical adaptation of 'The Nightmare Before Christmas'. He released his self-titled debut album Henric de la Cour, released in Scandinavia on 19 October 2011 and rest of the world on 28 October 2011. He was the subject of a biographical documentary film directed by Jacob Frössén, which premiered in 2013 and was broadcast on Swedish public television networks SVT and Norwegian NRK.

== Discography ==
=== Albums ===
As part of Yvonne

- 1995: Yvonne
- 1997: Getting Out, Getting Anywhere
- 1999: True Love
- 2001: Hit That City

As part of Strip Music

- 2004: Strip Music
- 2006: Hollywood & Wolfman

Solo

Year	Album	Peak positions	Certification
Year	Album	SWE	Certification
2011	Henric de la Cour	25	
2013	Mandrills	36	
2018	Gimme Daggers		
2025	My Bones, Your Ashes		

=== Singles ===
As part of Yvonne

- 1995: "Frozen"
- 1995: "Wires"
- 1997: "Modern Love"
- 1997: "Protect Me"
- 1999: "My Man Foreverman"
- 1999: "Sleepless Nights"
- 2000: "Revelations"
- 2001: "Bad Dream"
- 2001: "Out of the Gash"
- 2001: "Lost in the City Nights"

As part of Strip Music

- 2004: "Desperation"
- 2004: "Never Die"
- 2005: "24 Hrs"
- 2006: "Sugar and Lime"

Solo

- 2011: "80s"

== See also ==
- Strip Music
