= Phonetics (disambiguation) =

Phonetics is a branch of linguistics that comprises the study of the sounds of human speech.

Phonetics may also refer to:

- Journal of Phonetics, a peer-reviewed academic journal
- Shorthand Phonetics, an Indonesian rock music group

== See also ==
- International Phonetic Alphabet, an alphabetic system of phonetic notation based primarily on the Latin alphabet
- International Phonetic Association, an organization that promotes the scientific study and practical application of phonetics
- NATO phonetic alphabet, an alphabetic system used in radio communication
- Phonetic algorithm, algorithm for indexing of words by their pronunciation
- Phonetic alphabet (disambiguation)
- Phonetic complement, a phonetic symbol used to disambiguate word characters that have multiple readings
- Phonetic Extensions, a section of Unicode containing phonetic characters used in displaying phonetic symbols on a computer
- Phonetic transcription, using a phonetic alphabet to record speech in writing
