= Skaizerkite =

Studio album by Montt Mardié
- Released: 8 April 2009
- Recorded: 2009
- Genre: Indie pop
- Length: 48:00
- Label: Hybris

Montt Mardié chronology
Introducing...the Best Of (2009)	Skaizerkite (2009)

Professional ratings
Review scores
Source	Rating
Allmusic	3.5/5 stars

Skaizerkite is the third album from Montt Mardié. The album was made available for pre-order on March 4 and was officially released on April 8, 2009.

It was received positively in Mardié's homeland of Sweden, garnering significant radio play.

== Track listing ==
No.	Title	Length
1.	"Welcome to Stalingrad"
2.	"One Kiss"
3.	"Click Click"
4.	"Elisabeth by the Piano"
5.	"Bang Bang (Echo in Warsaw)"
6.	"Unknown Pleasures" (featuring Hanna Lovisa)
7.	"Last Year in Marienbad"
8.	"A Wedding in June" (featuring Andreas Mattsson)
9.	"Dancing Shoes"
10.	"The Stairs of the House That Haunted This Town (Jenny, Jenny, Jenny)"
11.	"Dungeons and Dragons"
12.	"I Love You Annie"
