= Look! It's El Perro del Mar! =

Studio album by El Perro del Mar
- Released: 2005
- Recorded: January 2004 – February 2005
- Genre: Pop
- Label: Hybris Records
- Producer: Sarah Assbring

El Perro del Mar chronology
Look! It's El Perro del Mar! (2005)	El Perro del Mar (2006)

Professional ratings
Review scores
Source	Rating
Allmusic	link

Look! It's El Perro del Mar! is the first album by El Perro del Mar. It was released by Hybris Records in 2005. The album is a compilation of singles and EPs recorded between January 2004 and February 2005. The Look! album was revised into Sarah's following self-titled album, which was released to wider audiences across the world than this album (which was released in Sweden only).

== Track listing ==
1. "Candy" - 3:24
2. "Sad" - 2:42
3. "Party" - 3:13
4. "Dog" - 3:02
5. "Coming Down the Hill" - 2:34
6. "People" - 3:20
7. "Shake It Off" - 3:34
8. "This Loneliness" - 4:44
9. "It's All Good" - 3:39
10. "I Can't Talk About It" - 2:57
11. "Here Comes That Feeling" - 3:15
