= Lebensraum (disambiguation) =

Lebensraum is a German concept of expansionism and Völkisch nationalism.

Lebensraum may also refer to:

- Lebensraum!, a 2014 album by Jonathan Johansson
- Lebensraum! (wargame), a 1984 WWII wargame

== See also ==
- Liebestraum (disambiguation)
