= Clocks/Pretender =

Studio album by Montt Mardié
- Released: 2007
- Recorded: 2007
- Genre: Indie pop
- Length: Clocks: 31:30; Pretender: 32:20
- Label: Hybris

Montt Mardié chronology
Drama (2005)	Clocks/Pretender (2007)	Introducing...the Best Of (2009)

Taiwan edition

Professional ratings
Review scores
Source	Rating
Allmusic	4.5/5 stars

Clocks/Pretender is the second album from Swedish indie pop musician Montt Mardié. The album contains two discs, the first disc, Clocks, being 10 new tracks by Montt Mardié, and the second, Pretender, being a disc of compilation tracks.

Clocks was released on the Taiwanese label Silent Agreement in 2008. Mardié supported the release by playing a few shows and a festival in Taipei.

== Track listing ==
=== Disc One: Clocks ===
1. "In which we meet the clocks and a song is revealed (Too many songs unwritten)"
2. "Set sail tomorrow"
3. "Birthday boy (drama)"
4. "I will write a book"
5. "Let's get away from it all"
6. "1969"
7. "Travelers"
8. "The windmill turns all the same"
9. "How I won the war"
10. "In which a sailor returns and we say good-bye for now (Set sail tomorrow)"

=== Disc Two: Pretender ===
1. "Surprised" (with Andreas Mattsson)
2. "Metropolis" (with Fredrik Hellström of Le Sport)
3. "Once I was so in love that I followed" (with Bobby Baby)
4. "Castle in the sky" (with Jens Lekman)
5. "Hurry home" (with The Legends)
6. "Daughters" (with Peder Stenberg of Deportees)
7. "Hacienda" (with Christian Zellinger)
8. "När vi gett dom våld ska vi ge er kärlek" (with Vapnet)
9. "Grand Prix finals" (with Mr Suitcase)
10. "Pretenders" (with Hello Saferide)
