= God Knows =

God Knows is a phrase used to express one's own lack of knowledge or understanding of a subject (akin to the phrase "I don't know") or to express the underlying truth of a statement (akin to "it is certainly true").

God Knows may also refer to:

- "God knows...", a song from anime The Melancholy of Haruhi Suzumiya
- God Knows (novel), a novel by Joseph Heller
- "God Knows" (song), a song by Mando Diao
- "God Knows", a song by Bob Dylan from the album Under The Red Sky
- "God Knows (You Gotta Give to Get)", a song by El Perro del Mar from the album El Perro del Mar
- God Knows, Zimbabwean-Irish rapper with Rusangano Family
