= David Pagmar =

- Also known as: Montt Mardié, Monty
- Born: David Olof Peter Pagmar; 16 September 1983 (age 43)
- Origin: Stockholm, Sweden
- Genres: Indie pop, soul, classical
- Occupations: Singer, songwriter, multi-instrumentalist, composer
- Years active: 2005–present
- Label: Hybris

David Olof Peter Pagmar (born 16 September 1983) is a Swedish singer, songwriter, multi-instrumentalist and composer. He has also performed as Montt Mardié and Monty. As Montt Mardié, he has released three full-length albums as well as various singles on the Swedish record label Hybris. He signed to the Taiwanese label Silent Agreement, as well as the UK label Ruffa Lane in 2007. May 2009 saw the release of his first UK release, Introducing...the Best Of. His first released studio album was Drama in 2005. In late 2009, he started to perform as Monty.

== History ==
David Pagmar was raised in Stockholm, Sweden. His debut release was the single/EP Highschool Drama, released on 14 October 2005. This was shortly followed by his debut full-length album Drama, released on 7 October 2005. One single developed from Drama, New York, released on 20 April 2006. He then released an EP entitled Science on 18 May 2006.

Mardié would later reuse some of the tracks from Science for his second full-length album, Clocks/Pretender, released on 18 April 2007. Clocks/Pretender was a double album, one disc containing Montt Mardié tracks and the other collaborations with other musicians.

Mardié announced he was working on a new album in early 2008. In the same blog post, Mardié explained he was in the middle of re-recording old songs for his first UK release. He revealed the title "Introducing... the best of Montt Mardié" to be official, joking that if he had gotten his way it would have been called "Death". Introducing... the best of Montt Mardié was released in May 2009 to positive reviews. The album's first single Set Sail Tomorrow was released in mid-2008, going straight to the NME-radio A-list. The single was put on the H&M instore radio from 2 July for a month, going out to 1,200 stores across 23 countries. The single also helped Mardié become Rookie of the Week on BBC 6music, and he was placed on the "Out in the City" top of the hot list.

Mardié's third Swedish album was finally released in April 2009. Skaizerkite unveiled twelve new tracks and introduced a cleaner and larger sound to Mardié's distinct pop-style, featuring collaborations with Hanna Lovisa and Andreas Mattsson (whom he had previously worked with on Clocks/Pretender).

On 15 May 2009 he uploaded the track We Are All The Pirate Bay onto The Pirate Bay tracker specifying "It's free and nobody will ever have to pay for it". This came after the provisional outcome of The Pirate Bay trial. The track was released using the Creative Commons license the song was up freely to be remixed and re-appropriated and many interpretations was made by fans and other artists such as Shorthand Phonetics which included a radically different version on their Creative Commons release "Errors in Calculating Odds, Errors in Calculating Value".

In November 2009 Pagmar announced a new project with the name Monty. His first release under this moniker was the single En till himmel which included a guest spot from rapper Lorentz from Lorentz and M. Sakarias. His first album under the Monty name was 2010, released by the Hybris label. His second album under the Monty name was 1000 år senare, also released by Hybris in 2011.

== Discography ==
=== Albums ===
==== Studio albums ====
Year	Album
2005	Drama: Released: 7 November 2005; Label: Hybris; Formats: CD
2007	Clocks/Pretender: Released: 2007; Label: Hybris; Formats: Double CD, digital download
2009	Skaizerkite: Released: 8 April 2009; Label: Hybris; Formats: CD, digital download

==== As Monty ====
Year	Album
2010	2010: Released: 2010; Label: Hybris; Formats: CD, digital download
2011	1000 år senare: Released: 2011; Label: Hybris; Formats: CD, digital download

==== Compilation albums ====
Year	Album
2009	Introducing...the Best Of: Released: 4 May 2009; Label: Ruffa Lane; Formats: CD, digital download; Notes: First UK release

=== Singles/EPs ===
Year	Single	Album
2005	Highschool Drama	Drama
2006	New York	Drama
2006	Science	
2008	Set Sail Tomorrow	Clocks/Pretender
2008	Modesty Blaise	Introducing...the Best Of
2008	Names Not Forgotten	Introducing...the Best Of
2009	We Are All The Pirate Bay	
