= Big Anonymous =

Studio album by El Perro del Mar
- Released: 16 February 2024
- Length: 45:11
- Language: English
- Label: City Slang
- Producer: El Perro del Mar; Petter Granberg; Jacob Haage; Daniel Rejmer; Vessel

El Perro del Mar chronology
We Are History (2020)	Big Anonymous (2024)

"It's a trip to the underworld that had to be taken to come back with greater knowledge. I don't want to say that Big Anonymous offers a totally bleak view on life and death. I think it's about being open and ready for what life is going to give you. Yes, it's going to give you horror, sadness and grief, but it's also going to bring you happiness, joy and surprises."

—El Perro del Mar's Sarah Assbring on the emotions in Big Anonymous

Big Anonymous is a 2024 studio album by Swedish indie rock musical act El Perro del Mar. It has received positive reviews from critics.

== Reception ==
According to the review aggregator Metacritic, Big Anonymous received "generally favorable reviews" based on a weighted average score of 78 out of 100 from 4 critic scores. Editors at AllMusic rated this album 3.5 out of 5 stars, with critic Fred Thomas writing that "the sadness that has long underscored Swedish singer/songwriter Sarah Assbring's work as El Perro del Mar becomes the predominant force" on this album "with spacious and dismal arrangements serving as a stage for observations on grief and existential dread". In a profile for Alternative Press, Anna Zanes stated that Assbring's "music is an incredible, uncomfortably human experience, for both listeners and the artist herself" and that "on Big Anonymous, she's digging deeper, unleashing more discomfort, in speaking to themes of death and spirituality, and thereby offering the same embrace and company she once sought from sorrowful music herself". Online retailer Bandcamp chose this for Album of the Day and critic Elle Carroll Kieron stated that "Assbring contemplates death and loss and, in doing so, traces the ways language and music ultimately falter before the immensity of both" and that "one senses that these ten songs were the only acceptable substitute Assbring could countenance for the silence within". Writing for The Line of Best Fit, Michael Hoffman gave this work a 9 out of 10, comparing this to 2006's From the Valley to the Stars, but with this being "bigger, bolder, and darker than its predecessor", with "delicate vocals [that] float above and between ghostly ambience, white noise, reverbed choral backing, expansive orchestral string arrangements, and bright synths that cut like daggers through the darkness of warped, industrial beats". Tyler of Mojo rated this album a 4 out of 5 stars, opining that "musically, the spectral sound lies between Fever Ray at their least forbidding and the shadows cast by David Lynch soundtracks". John Murphy of musicOMH scored Big Anonymous 3 out of 5 stars, writing that "there's an unsettling, dark tinge to this album" and "Assbring is at her best when she fully embraces the yearning that grief can produce", but the album "can be a bit of a slog".

== Track listing ==
All songs written by Petter Granberg, Jacob Haage, and El Perro del Mar, except where noted.

1. "Underworld" – 1:49
2. "Suburban Dreams" – 4:56
3. "Cold Dark Pond" – 5:03
4. "In Silence" – 5:40
5. "The Truth the Dead Know" – 3:16
6. "Between You and Me Nothing" – 3:53
7. "Please Stay" (Burt Bacharach and Bob Hilliard) – 5:33
8. "One More Time" – 4:15
9. "Wipe Me Off This Earth" – 4:27
10. "Kiss of Death" – 5:19

== Personnel ==
- El Perro del Mar – instrumentation, vocals, mixing, production
- Johanna Dahl – strings
- Moderna Dansteatern – recording
- Petter Granberg – production
- Philip Granqvist – audio mastering
- Jacob Haage – mixing, production
- Joseph Kadow – photography
- Anna Manell – strings
- Tomas Nordmark – artwork
- Daniel Rejmer – mixing, production
- Shida Shahabi – piano on "Cold Dark Pond"
- Leo Svensson Sander – strings
- Vessel – additional production on "One More Time" and "Kiss of Death"
- Nicole Walker – art direction

== See also ==
- 2024 in rock music
- List of 2024 albums
