= Introducing...the Best Of =

Greatest hits album by Montt Mardié
- Released: 2009
- Recorded: 2005–2009
- Genre: Indie pop
- Length: 1:00:00
- Label: Ruffa Lane

Montt Mardié chronology
Clocks/Pretender (2007)	Introducing...the Best Of (2009)	Skaizerkite (2009)

Introducing...the Best of is the first compilation album and first UK release from Swedish musician Montt Mardié. The album comprises 2 new tracks, 6 re-recorded tracks from his debut album Drama and nine tracks from Clocks/Pretender.

== Track listing ==
No.	Title	Length
1.	"Modesty Blaise"
2.	"Set Sail Tomorrow"
3.	"Names Not Forgotten"
4.	"How I Won The War"
5.	"Huckleberry Friend"
6.	"1969"
7.	"Prom Night"
8.	"Smile Charlie"
9.	"Too Many Songs Unwritten"
10.	"Travellers"
11.	"Paddy (You won't get what you deserve)"
12.	"Birthday Boy"
13.	"How To Kill A Mockingbird"
14.	"Pretenders"
15.	"The Windmill Turns All The Same"
16.	"Castle In The Sky"
17.	"Phone Call Drama"

== Notes ==
Modesty Blaise, Huckleberry Friend, Prom Night, Smile Charlie, How to Kill a Mockingbird and Phone Call Drama were all previously released on Montt Mardié's debut album Drama, and have here been re-recorded. Bag of Marbles is re-recorded as Smile Charlie.

Set Sail Tomorrow, How I Won The War, 1969, Too Many Songs Unwritten, Travellers, Birthday Boy, Pretenders, The Windmill Turns All The Same and Castle In The Sky were all previously released on Mardié's double album Clocks/Pretender, as was the bonus track My Girlfriend Is In The Grand Prix Finals.
