= Pedreira Paulo Leminski =

Outdoor concert venue in Curitiba, Brazil

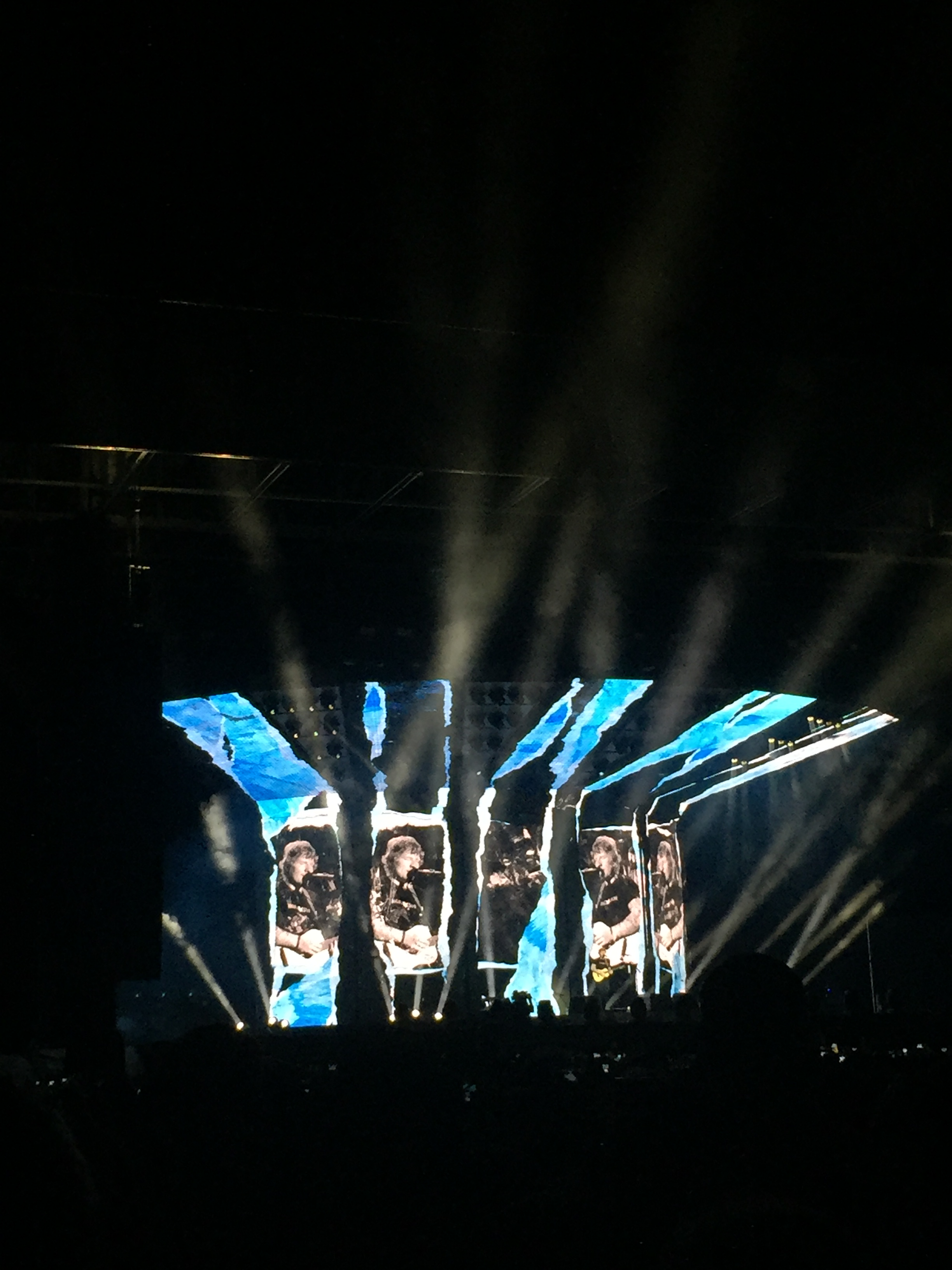
- Ed Sheeran performing at Pedreira Paulo Leminski in 2017

- Location within Paraná Location within Brazil
- Address: R. João Gava, 970
- Location: Curitiba, Paraná, Brazil
- Coordinates: 25.384666°S 49.277598°W
- Capacity: 25,000
- Type: Outdoor
- Event: Music
- Current use: Concerts

Construction
- Opened: 1990
- Years active: 1990-present

The Pedreira Paulo Leminski is a 25,000-capacity outdoor concert venue located in Curitiba, Brazil. It was partly named after Paulo Leminski, a twentieth century Brazilian writer, and because it served as the Municipal Pedreira, or rock quarry. Located in the neighborhood of Abranches, the site is about 103,500 metres (339,600 ft) long, its stage is around 480 square metres (5,200 sq ft), and it is surrounded by a rock wall 30-metre-high (98 ft). It was first opened in 1990.

The Wire Opera House was opened in 1992 for the first Curitiba Theater Festival. Together, the two sites make up the Parque das Pedreiras.

In July 2008, the holding of large events was prohibited in the place by an injunction in a Public Civil Action filed by the Public Ministry of Paraná, based on a request from the residents of the region, who alleged disrespect for the schedule of shows and riots caused by visitors. After a legal dispute between the space's neighbors and the municipal government, which had taken place since 2008, an agreement was reached, which included a renovation with new adaptations and some restrictions for shows and, thus, the quarry was released in September 2013. With the improvements made, at a cost of R$ 17 million, the space was reopened in March 2014.

== Events in Pedreira ==
During the city's three hundredth anniversary celebrations, the Pedreira hosted the tenor José Carreras, who was accompanied by the Brazilian Symphony Orchestra.

== Concerts (partial list) ==
Concerts at Pedreira Paulo Leminski
Date	Artist	Tour	Attendance
5 December 1993	Paul McCartney	The New World Tour	—
12 March 1994	INXS	Dirty Honeymoon World Tour	—
12 November 1994	Ramones	20th Anniversary Tour	—
29 October 1995	Bon Jovi	These Days Tour	—
11 October 1996	AC/DC	Ballbreaker World Tour	—
31 October 1997	David Bowie, No Doubt, Rita Lee & Erasure	Close-Up Planet Festival	—
6 December 1998	Iron Maiden, Helloween & Raimundos	Skol Rock Festival	22,000
7 May 2004	Teenage Fanclub & Hell On Wheels	Curitiba Pop Festival	—
8 May 2004	Pixies	Curitiba Pop Festival	—
23 September 2005	Avril Lavigne	Bonez Tour	8,000
30 November 2005	Pearl Jam'	2005 Latin American Tour	16,000
31 October 2006	Beastie Boys, Yeah Yeah Yeahs, Patti Smith, DJ Shadow & Nação Zumbi	TIM Festival	12,000
10 November 2006	The Black Eyed Peas	The Monkey Business Tour	—
19 April 2007	Evanescence	The Open Door Tour	—
31 October 2007	The Killers, Arctic Monkeys, Björk & Hot Chip	TIM Festival	—
4 March 2008	Iron Maiden	Somewhere Back In Time World Tour	25,000
21 April 2015	KISS	40th Anniversary World Tour	14,980
28 April 2015	Ozzy Osbourne, Judas Priest & Motörhead	Monsters Of Rock Festival	12,820
29 September 2015	Katy Perry	Prismatic World Tour	16,076
14 December 2015	David Gilmour	Rattle That Lock Tour	23,300
27 August 2016	Angra	Holy Land 20th Anniversary Tour	—
17 November 2016	Guns N' Roses	Not in This Lifetime... Tour	25,030
30 November 2016	Black Sabbath	The End Tour	22,934
31 March 2017	Elton John & James Taylor	Wonderful Crazy Night Tour / Before This World Tour	11,379
23 May 2017	Ed Sheeran	÷ Tour	17,400
22 October 2017	John Mayer	The Search for Everything World Tour	11,417
5 November 2017	Green Day	Revolution Radio Tour	12,205
12 December 2017	Deep Purple, Cheap Trick & Tesla	Solid Rock Festival	5,269
2 March 2018	Foo Fighters & Queens Of The Stone Age	Concrete and Gold Tour / Villains World Tour	22,000
16 May 2018	Ozzy Osbourne	No More Tours 2	11,240
16 October 2018	Camila Cabello, Anavitória, Cat Dealers, Vitor Kley & Zeeba	Z Festival	—
7 November 2018	Noel Gallagher's High Flying Birds & Foster The People	Summer Break Festival	—
8 November 2018	Judas Priest, Alice In Chains & Black Star Riders	Solid Rock Festival	—
31 August 2019	Sandy & Junior	Turnê Nossa História	24,459
18 September 2019	Scorpions, Whitesnake & Europe	Rock Ao Vivo	—
27 September 2019	Bon Jovi	This House Is Not For Sale Tour	22,714
8 November 2019	Hillsong UNITED	The People Tour MMXIX	—
28 April 2022	KISS	End of the Road World Tour	18,188
18 May 2022	Gorillaz	World Tour 2022	10,000
27 August 2022	Iron Maiden	Legacy of the Beast World Tour	24,289
21 September 2022	Guns N' Roses	We're F'N' Back! Tour	24,450
8 November 2022	Arctic Monkeys	The Car Tour	—
10 December 2022	Harry Styles	Love On Tour	23,466
25 January 2023	Backstreet Boys	DNA World Tour	15,898
2 March 2023	Imagine Dragons	Mercury World Tour	22,065
1 September 2023	Post Malone	If Y'all Weren't Here, I'd Be Crying Tour	—
