= Klagomuren =

Studio album by Jonathan Johansson
- Released: 28 October 2011
- Length: 39:41
- Language: Swedish
- Label: Hybris
- Producer: Johan Eckeborn

Jonathan Johansson chronology
En hand i himlen (2009)	Klagomuren (2011)	Ett språk för dom dömda (2013)

Klagomuren (Swedish for The Wailing Wall) is the third studio album by Swedish musician Jonathan Johansson. The album was released on 28 October 2011 to critical acclaim, earning three Grammis nominations. Four singles were released from the album: "Blommorna", "Stockholm", "Centrum" and "Ingenting stort". The album was his last release on the label Hybris, as he moved to Sony Music for the release of his fourth album Ett språk för dom dömda.

== Track listing ==
All music written by Jonathan Johansson and Johan Eckeborn. All lyrics written by Jonathan Johansson.

Klagomuren track listing
No.	Title	Length
1.	"Intro"	2:03
2.	"Stockholm"	3:42
3.	"Centrum" (Centre)	4:46
4.	"Redan glömda" (Already Forgotten)	4:28
5.	"Blommorna" (The Flowers)	3:57
6.	"Under sjukhusen" (Under the Hospitals)	4:36
7.	"Som om" (As If)	3:51
8.	"Horoskop" (Horoscope)	3:37
9.	"Ingenting stort" (Nothing Big)	4:34
10.	"Min ljusaste röst" (My Brightest Voice)	4:08

== Personnel ==
- Jonathan Johansson – music, lyrics, vocals, guitar
- Johan Eckeborn – organ, bass, synthesizer, drums, production, recording, music
- Tom Coyne – mastering
- Kalle Magnusson – design (typography)
- Rikkard Häggbom – design (photography)

== Charts ==
Chart performance for Klagomuren
Chart (2011)	Peak position
Danish Albums (Hitlisten)	34
Swedish Albums (Sverigetopplistan)	35
