= Vapnet =

Swedish band

Vapnet (the weapon or the coat of arms) was a Swedish indie pop band from Östersund, signed by record label Hybris. Lead singer was Martin Hanberg and songwriter was Martin Abrahamsson (now active in Nord & Syd), who were also active in the indie pop band Sibiria. Their single "Kalla mig" was a big sleeper hit in Sweden in spring/summer 2005. Their album Jag vet hur man väntar was released April 19, 2006, featuring among other tracks a remix on "Kalla mig" by Swedish soul artist Kaah. Their song "Håll Ihop," from the EP Något Dåligt Nytt Har Hänt, featured Jens Lekman.

== Discography ==
- Ge Dom Våld (Give Them Violence) (CDR)
- Ge Dom Våld (Give Them Violence) (EP)
- Thoméegränd (EP) (CD) (Thomée-Alley) (2006)
- Jag vet hur man väntar (I know how to wait) (CD) (2006)
- Något dåligt nytt har hänt (Something bad new has happened) (EP) (2007)
- Döda Fallet (The Dead Fall) (2008)
