= Jonathan Johansson (musician) =

Swedish musician and singer-songwriter (born 1980)

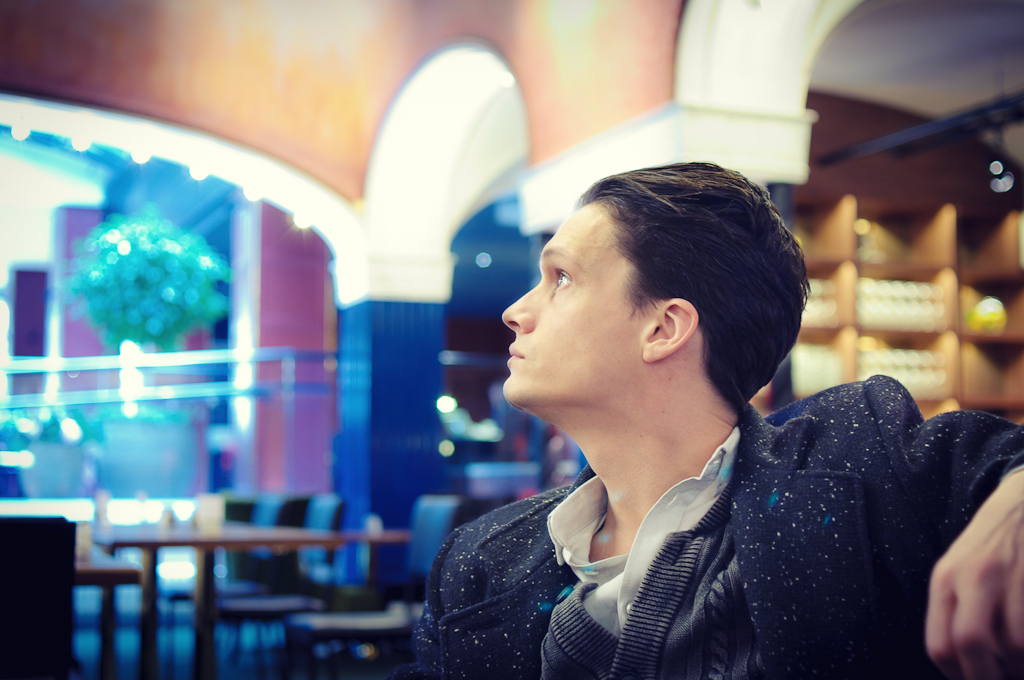

Background information
- Born: 29 August 1980 (age 45)
- Origin: Malmö, Sweden
- Genres: Synthpop
- Occupation: Singer-songwriter
- Label: Hybris

Jonathan Johansson (born 29 August 1980) is a Swedish musician and singer-songwriter from Malmö. He is currently signed to Hybris Records.

Pitchfork describes his music as containing "the bruised emotionalism and chilly synthcraft of his Swedish language debut, En hand i himlen ("A Hand in Heaven/the sky").

His single "Aldrig Ensam" was remixed by Swedish electronic act Boeoes Kaelstigen.

== Discography ==
=== Albums ===
Album and details	Peak positions	
Album and details	SWE	DEN
OK, ge mig timmarna: Year released: 2005; Record label: Eckwork Records	–	–
En hand i himlen: Year released: 2009; Record label: Hybris	58	–
Klagomuren: Year released: 2011; Record label: Hybris	35	34
Ett språk för dom dömda: Year released: 2013; Record label: S:t C / Sony	27	–
Lebensraum!: Year released: 2015; Record label: S:t C / Sony	28	–
Love & Devotion: Year released: 2016; Record label: S:t C / Sony	33	–
Scirocco: Year released: 2020; Record label: S:t C / Sony	–	–
Om vi får leva: Year released: 2022; Record label: Milkshake / Sony	37	–

=== Singles ===
Year	Single	Peak positions		Album
Year	Single	SWE	DEN	Album
2008	"En hand i himlen"	—	—	En hand i himlen
2009	"Aldrig ensam"	35	22	
2011	"Blommorna"	—	—	
2011	"Stockholm"	—	—	
2016	"Sommarkläder"	—	—	
2019	"Rosa himmel"	— (Note: "Rosa himmel" did not enter the Swedish Singellista Chart, but peaked at number 15 on the Swedish Heatseeker Chart.)	—	
2020	"Come Whatever, Come What May" (with My Marianne)	29	—	
2023	"Högt över havet"	— (Note: "Högt över havet" did not enter the Swedish Singellista Chart, but peaked at number four on the Swedish Heatseeker Chart.)	—	
