= KoKoro =

Studio album by El Perro del Mar
- Released: 16 September 2016
- Length: 34:35
- Language: English
- Label: The Control Group
- Producer: El Perro del Mar; Jacob Haage

El Perro del Mar chronology
| I Was a Boy (2013) | KoKoro (2016) | We Are History (2018) |

KoKoro is a 2016 studio album by Swedish indie rock musical act El Perro del Mar. It has received positive reviews from critics for expanding existing indie sounds with a variety of world music influences.

== Reception ==
According to the review aggregator Metacritic, KoKoro received "generally favorable reviews" based on a weighted average score of 80 out of 100 from 10 critic scores. Editors at AllMusic rated this album 4 out of 5 stars, with critic Tim Sendra writing that El Perro del Mar "wraps her brightly melancholy melodies in a jangling, worldly layer of sound that includes African rhythms, Middle Eastern drums, Asian woodwinds and strings, and rumbling bass" that results in "a stunning upgrade, and KoKoro stands as one of the best works of her already pretty great career". At Clash Music, Lois Browne called this an "elegant record which serves up something far from the norm" and gave it an 8 out of 10 for being "unusual, refreshing and vulnerable". Writing for Drowned in Sound, Bekki Bemrose rated KoKoro an 8 out of 10, characterizing it as "a finely-drawn treat", with "a delicate layer of melancholy that hangs over many of the compositions". Laura Sciarpelletti of Exclaim! rated this album a 9 out of 10, stating that it "finds the Scandinavian beauty departing from her signature melancholic pop style to embark on a journey of cultural instrumental exploration", which "proves her undying artistry with an obvious focus on beauty and the human heart".

No Ripcord's Juan Edgardo Rodríguez gave this work a 7 out of 10, writing that "beauty and elegance is always at the core of every El Perro del Mar release" and praised Sarah Assbring's for "utiliz[ing] an assortment of Asian and Middle Eastern instrumentation that provides a colorful and enlightening view to the album’s self-reflective musical excursions". Editors at Pitchfork scored this release 7.1 out of 10 and critic Bejamin Scheim praised Assbring's ability to take "global influences [to] bring her to bright new places with inspiring albeit uneven results", criticizing that the music is "drawing from these ethnocultural traditions without a sense of clear rhyme or reason" but continuing that "Assbring’s knack for creating well-written, catchy melodies carries the record it even in its slightest moments". At PopMatters, Pryor Stroud characterized KoKoro as "a sound that is both startlingly unique and warmly familiar" and scored it a 7 out of 10, noting that for listeners of this band, there will be new sounds, but a continuity with the themes and moods of previous albums. Jeremy Allen of The Quietus characterized this music as "pure pop alchemy" and the strength of the songwriting counteracts any suggestions of cultural appropriation.

== Track listing ==
All songs written by Jacob Haage and El Perro del Mar.

1. "Endless Ways" – 4:05
2. "Kokoro" – 2:57
3. "Breadandbutter" – 3:11
4. "Clean Your Window" – 3:20
5. "Ging Ging" – 4:32
6. "Kouign-Amman" – 3:39
7. "A-Bun-Dance" – 3:28
8. "Hard Soft Hard" – 3:14
9. "Ding Sum" – 3:38
10. "Nougat Mind" – 2:31

== Personnel ==
- El Perro del Mar – instrumentation, vocals, production
- Mattias Bergqvist – instrumentation
- Johan Berthling – instrumentation
- Philip Granqvist – audio mastering
- Jacob Haage – mixing, production
- Per "Rusktrask" Johansson – instrumentation
- Nina Kihlborg – artwork
- Ari King – photography
- Tomas Normark – sleeve design
- Mathias Oldén – mixing
- Andreas Söderström – instrumentation
- Nicole Walker – art direction, artwork, photography

== See also ==
- 2016 in rock music
- 2016 in Swedish music
- List of 2016 albums
