= Pale Fire (album) =

Studio album by El Perro del Mar
- Released: (Sweden) (United Kingdom) November 12, 2012 (United States) (European Union) November 13, 2012
- Recorded: 2012
- Genre: Electronic, Indie, Pop
- Label: Memphis Industries
- Producer: Sarah Assbring

El Perro del Mar chronology
Love Is Not Pop (2009)	Pale Fire (2012)

Professional ratings
Aggregate scores
Source	Rating
Metacritic	66/100
Review scores
Source	Rating
BBC	Positive
Slant Magazine	4/5 stars
Pitchfork	(6.0/10)
NME	7/10 stars
Filter	8/10 stars
Prefix	8/10 stars

Pale Fire is the fifth studio album by El Perro Del Mar released on 13 November 2012 on Memphis Industries, The Control Group and INGRID.

== Critical reception ==
The album received positive to mixed reviews. Kevin Leidel of Slant Magazine called it "one of the most beguiling and unique offerings of the Swedish pack" saying Assbring "consistently displays a steady hand with her experimentation". Prefix praised "effortless knack for poetic personification", referring to 'I Was a Boy' a "humbling, devastating, quiet pop ballad". Pitchfork while generally positive, expressed disappointment in light of the 2011 release 'What Do You Expect', stating, "the idea of a dance album from El Perro Del Mar is tantalizing: tears on the floor and a thick, moody fog in the air, as apt for dancing as for watching shadows".

== Track listing ==
1. "Pale Fire"
2. "Hold Off the Dawn"
3. "Home Is to Feel Like That"
4. "I Carry the Fire"
5. "Love Confusion"
6. "Walk on By"
7. "Love in Vain"
8. "To the Beat of a Dying World"
9. "I Was a Boy"
10. "Dark Night"

== Charts ==
Chart (2013)	Peak position
Swedish Albums Chart	43

== Tour ==
Date	City	Country	Venue
November 1, 2012	Bergen	Norway	Ekkofestival
November 2, 2012	Malmö	Sweden	Inkonst
November 3, 2012	Copenhagen	Denmark	Vega
November 10, 2012	Bristol	United Kingdom	Fear of fiction
November 11, 2012	Manchester	United Kingdom	The Castle
November 12, 2012	London	United Kingdom	Village Underground
November 13, 2012	London	United Kingdom	Instore Rough Trade East
November 14, 2012	Amsterdam	Netherlands	Paradiso
November 15, 2012	Hamburg	Germany	Uebel & Gefärlich
November 16, 2012	Berlin	Germany	HBC
November 22, 2012	Gothenburg	Sweden	Neferiti
November 27, 2012	Paris	France	Point Ephémère
November 28, 2012	Barcelona	Spain	Music Hall
November 29, 2012	Zaragoza	Spain	La Lata De Bombillas
November 30, 2012	Madrid	Spain	Circulo Des Bellas Arte
December 1, 2012	Stockholm	Sweden	Strand
December 7, 2012	Oslo	Norway	Blå
December 13, 2012	Helsinki	Finland	Korjaamo
