= Sibiria =

Swedish indie pop band

Sibiria was a Swedish indie pop band from Östersund, signed by the record label Hybris. It was founded in 2003 by the guitarist Martin Abrahamsson (also in the band Vapnet), the singer Martin Hanberg (Vapnet) and the guitarist Erik Laquist. In 2006, the drummer Eric Ramsey joined the band.

== Discography ==
=== Albums ===
- Norrlands Inland (September 28, 2005)
- Inom Familjen (November 15, 2006)

=== Singles ===
- "Sibiria" (CDR) (April 2, 2003)
- "Ljusdal" (CDR) (February 11, 2004)
- "#3" (CDR) (August 8, 2004)
- "Christian Olsson" (CDR) (August 8, 2005)
- "(Jag kunde ha varit) Vem som helst" (MP3) (September 17, 2005)
- "Omtagning" (CDR) (June 25, 2006)
- "Det har varit svårare" (MP3) (October 25, 2006)
