= Hell on Wheels (band) =

- Origin: Oxelösund, Nyköping, Sweden
- Genres: Indie rock
- Years active: 1994–present
- Labels: Hybris
- Members: Rickard Lindgren; Johan Risberg; Åsa Sohlgren; Jonas Hansson

Hell on Wheels is a Swedish indie rock band. The band was formed in the autumn of 1994 and soon established themselves. Hell on Wheels first release was the Power bubbles blown by big bitch 7" single on the Make it Happen label. The first album called There is a Generation of Handicapped People to Carry on was released in 2001, followed by Oh my god! What have I done? in 2003. 2006 saw the release of Hell on Wheels third album entitled The Odd Church.

== Members ==
- Rickard Lindgren: guitar, vocals
- Åsa Sohlgren: bass guitar, vocals
- Johan Risberg: drums
- Jonas Hansson: guitar

== Discography ==
=== Studio albums ===
- 2001 – There is a Generation of Handicapped People to Carry on, (North of no south, NONSCD 78/NONSLP 78)
- 2003 – Oh my God! What have I done?, (North of no south/MNW, NONSCD 93)
- 2004 – Oh my God! What have I done?, (Little Snowman, LSCD-0007)
- 2006 – The Odd Church, (Hybris, HYBR028, HYBR035)
- 2011 – One Ros, (Hybris, HYBR084)

=== Compilations ===
- 2004 – From Roslagsgatan to Södra Hammarbyhamnen 1994-2004, (North of no south, NONSCD 127)

=== Singles and EPs ===
- 1998 – Power Bubbles Blown by Big Bitch, (Make it Happen, MKTH03)
- 1999 – Alpha Phozz & the Beta Hustle, (Urinine Records, URN CD-008)
- 2000 – What is the Influence, (North of no south, NONSCD 74)
- 2001 – The Soda, (North of no south, NONSCD 77)
- 2002 – Blinded by the Light, (North of no south/MNW)
- 2003 – It's Wrong Being a Boy, (North of no south, NONSCD 114)
- 2003 – Halos are Holes Made of Space, (North of no south, NONSCD 116)
- 2003 – Nothing is Left, (North of no south, NONSCD 119)
- 2004 – Our Sweetness has Become a Problem, (North of no south, NONSCD 121)
- 2006 – Come on, (Hybris, 2HYBR019)
- 2006 – Alexandr, (Hybris, HYBR034)
- 2011 – Baby, (Hybris, 4HYBR009)
- 2011 – the Night, (Hybris, HYBR093)

=== Contributions on compilation albums ===
- 2001 – A Single Bite, (Labrador, LAB002)
- 2001 – All Songs Are Sad Songs, (Make it Happen, MKTH11)
- 2001 – Festivalsommar 2001, (MNW, MNWPR 2001-5)
- 2004 – Eurosonic 2004, (EBU-UER, SONIC 06)
- 2004 – La La Love You Pixies! - A Tribute, (Düsseldorf Recordings, DE 2)
- 2004 – Delicious Evenings at Softore, (Delicious Goldfish, DGR 004)
- 2006 – Svensk Indie 1988-2006 - En Kärleks Historia, (North of no south, NONSCD 136)
- 2007 – Little Darla Has A Treat For You V.25 Endless Summer 2007-08, (Darla Records, DRL 190)
