= Liebestraum =

Liebestraum (German, 'love dream') may refer to:

- Liebesträume, a set of three solo piano nocturnes by Franz Liszt published in 1850
- Liebestraum (film), a 1991 American mystery film

== See also ==
- Lebensraum (disambiguation)
