= Errors in Calculating Odds, Errors in Calculating Value =

Studio album by Shorthand Phonetics
- Released: May 16, 2009 (Tsefula/Tsefuelha Records), July 2, 2009 (Yes No Wave Music)
- Genre: Indie rock, Lo-fi
- Length: 80:00 (Tsefula/Tsefuelha Records Release), 90:12 (Yes No Wave Music 2 CD Release)
- Label: Tsefula/Tsefuelha Records and Yes No Wave Music
- Producer: Ababil Ashari

Shorthand Phonetics chronology
Score No. 1 (Dream:Chase) in A major, Op. 17 for Three Electric Guitars, One Bass Guitar and One Drum Kit (2009)	Errors in Calculating Odds, Errors in Calculating Value (2009)

Errors in Calculating Odds, Errors in Calculating Value is the fourth album release by indie rock outfit Shorthand Phonetics. It is a concept album which represents the first draft of fictional character Hanabishi Hideaki's debut novel entitled "Errors in Calculating Odds, Errors in Calculating Value"

== Content summary ==
"Errors" is an eighty minute concept album that is an aural representation of the first draft of Hanabishi Hideaki's debut novel, "Errors in Calculating Odds, Errors in Calculating Value". The novel is a recounting of the events of Hide's third year in Eiroku Medical School located in Jikyoku-to, Japan.

The thing about this first draft is that the names used in this first draft still retain its original inspiration. Hide is Hide, Tsubasa is Tsubasa, Miyuki is Miyuki and so on and so forth. Each song represents a chapter in the final draft of the novel, and it is supported by an excerpt from the final draft of the novel. It is hard to explain with words, so it is imparitive that the album is listened to while reading the booklet provided. (Ababil Ashari)

- from the release notes given with the recording on the Yes No Wave Music page for the album

== Track listing ==
All tracks are written by A. Ashari, except where noted

Tsefula/Tsefuelha Records Digital Release/Yes No Wave Release Folder 1
No.	Title	Writer(s)	Length
1.	"Yr #1 In My Mind, Jenna Fischer Analogue"		5:00
2.	"Starring Shinohara Yumi as Unity Telosio in SABER 2RD DESTINY: unity no chiryoku"		5:08
3.	"The Hardest Achievement"		4:11
4.	"Picture Day"		4:33
5.	"To the Girl I Think Might be Similar to the Girl Flight of the Conchords Were Thinking About When They Were Writing "The Most Beautiful Girl (In the Room)""		7:51
6.	"When I Ask for the Time, I'm Really Asking for Your Voice"		5:14
7.	"Fear and Loathing in Jikyoku-to"		6:05
8.	"Check Your Logic By the Door (Call Me When You Wanna Be Treated Like the Goddess That You Are, Tsubasa-chan.)"		7:07
9.	"Don't Worry You'll Roll a Twenty Eventually / A Fourth-Wall Shattering Intervention"		4:34
10.	"Natalies for Glasses IV ("Remember when I said, "Yes, joining Castle would be a very bad idea for me but I'm joining anyway," and followed it up with a string of maniacal laughter while playing Mass Effect and I queued up "橙" by チャットモンチー and "One More Sad Song" by the All-American Rejects for you to hear? Look where it got us...look where it got her. I'm wanted to quit, by the way. But I won't, I guess. Cause I love you guys! But I dunno...")"	A. Ashari and A. Aliyanissa	7:40
11.	""This Might Be the Last Time We Ever Meet, So I Guess Now's Probably the Perfect Moment to Say I'm Sorry...for Everything." an A/U Firefly fanfic by Hanabishi Hideaki." (This track includes a prolonged silence after the 14:10 mark to be broke by the hidden track "Today Adam Gets His Hair Cut". This track is shortened to 14:10 in the Yes No Wave re-release.)		22:37

Yes No Wave Release Folder 2
No.	Title	Writer(s)	Length
1.	"Today Adam Gets His Hair Cut"		2:44
2.	"We're All the Pirate Bay (Poorly Thought Out Elaboration Pop-Punk-Post-Hardcore-Whatever Version by Attention Deprived Indie "Band")" (This track is a Montt Mardié cover with added lyrics by Ababil Ashari. Despite the added lyrical content the track is only officially credited to Montt Mardié. The original version is titled "We Are All The Pirate Bay".)	Montt Mardié	3:03
3.	"Miyuki's Limited Crush on a University of Kyoto Med Student, a Musical Representation Of"	A. Ashari and V. L. Hidajat	6:05
4.	"Gw Ngajak Cw Ntn Gw Debat Tp Ternyta Debatnya Gak Jd Jd Gak Pa-Pa Sih Sebenernya Uhh Soalnya Dia Jg Gak Jg Bs Dtg Jg...So It's Cool Really...T.T" (This track is the first Shorthand Phonetics song with lyrics in Indonesian.)		3:30
5.	"Manic Depression (Is An Outdated Term...Yet It Sings Better)" (This track contains an interpolation of "The Doom Song" as sung by the fictional character GIR on the Nickelodeon show "Invader Zim")		3:16
