= Love Is Not Pop =

Studio album by El Perro del Mar
- Released: (Sweden) 1 April 2009
- Recorded: 2008
- Genre: Pop
- Label: Licking Fingers (Scandinavia)
- Producer: Sarah Assbring, Rasmus Hägg

El Perro del Mar chronology
From the Valley to the Stars (2008)	Love Is Not Pop (2009)	Pale Fire (2012)

Professional ratings
Review scores
Source	Rating
AllMusic	4/5 stars
Pitchfork	(7.8/10)
Redefine	(A−)

Love Is Not Pop is an album by El Perro del Mar. It was released in Sweden on 1 April 2009 and in the US on 20 October. The first single, "Change of Heart", was released on 23 February 2009.

== Track listing ==
All songs written by Sarah Assbring, except where noted.

1. "Gotta Get Smart" - 5:03
2. "Change of Heart" - 5:08
3. "L Is for Love" - 4:32
4. "Let Me In" - 3:02
5. "Heavenly Arms" (Lou Reed) - 5:37
6. "It Is Something (To Have Wept)" (lyrics by G. K. Chesterton) - 5:10
7. "A Better Love" - 4:24
