= El Perro del Mar =

One-person Swedish band

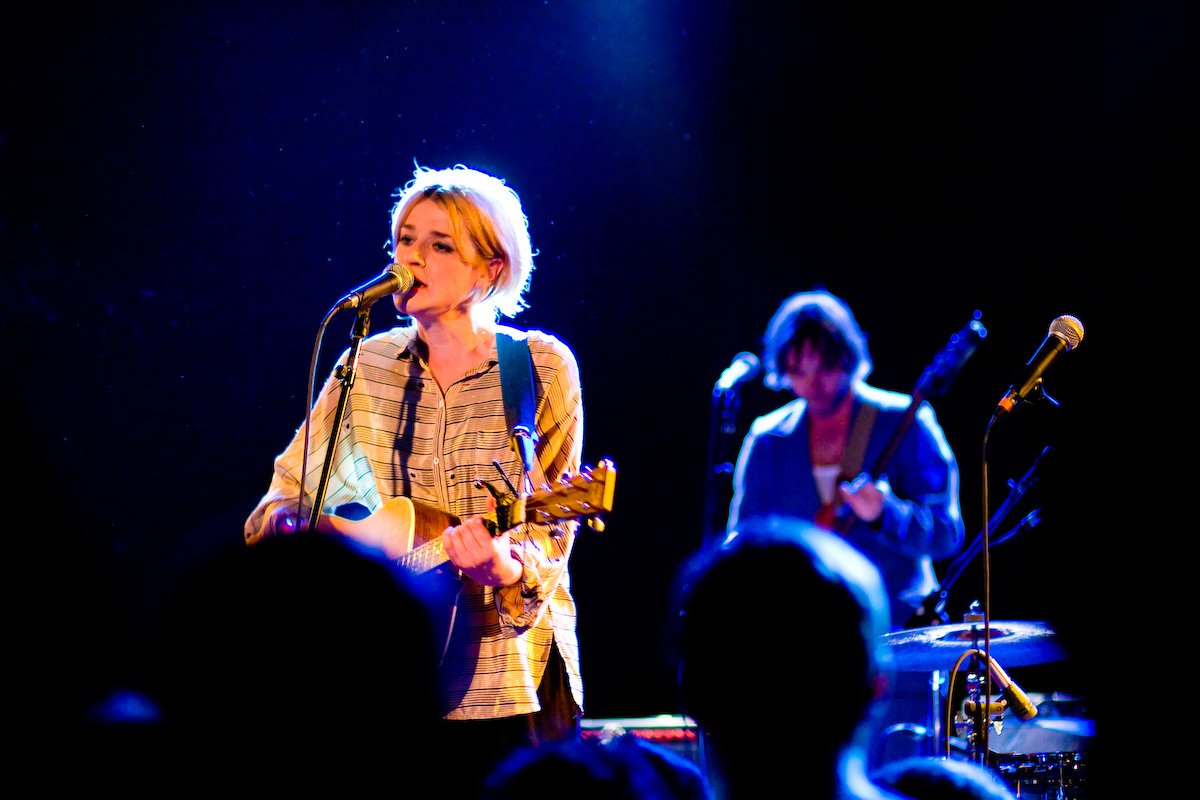

Background information
- Origin: Gothenburg, Sweden
- Genres: Indie pop
- Years active: 2003–present
- Labels: Ging Ging Recordings; The Control Group; INGRID; Memphis Industries; Licking Fingers; Hybris Records
- Members: Sarah Assbring
- Website: Official Site

El Perro del Mar (literally "The Dog of the Sea" in Spanish) is a musical project that was founded in December 2003 in Gothenburg, Sweden. The sole member of El Perro del Mar, Sarah Assbring (born 1977), initially started as an MP3/CD-R artist and released her first songs through Hybris Records. Her music could originally have been described as melancholic indie pop, but in recent years she is noted for being a "chameleon" with "every visual, sound, costume, and so on painstakenly thought out" for consecutive albums.

From 2004 to late 2005, Assbring's records had only been released by the Swedish label, Hybris, but in 2006, she experienced a host of new-found success when the album El Perro del Mar was picked up by UK-based label Memphis Industries, under which Dungen and The Go! Team also release. The album was also released by US label The Control Group in The U.S. and Canada. The Control Group has remained El Perro del Mar's American label home. Prior to the self-titled album, Assbring had recorded and released Look! It's El Perro del Mar! and the EP You Gotta Give to Get, in Spring 2005 and November 2005 respectively.

In early 2007, El Perro del Mar ended the relationship with Hybris and started recording for The Concretes's label, Licking Fingers. Her second album, titled From the Valley to the Stars, was released in Spring 2008. In 2009, El Perro del Mar collaborated with Rasmus Hägg (the other half of Gothenburg-based duo Studio) on what became her third album, Love Is Not Pop. The album was well received with the single "Change of Heart" standing out as a unique beat-driven melancholy pop-song. During the recording of her fourth album, Pale Fire, Assbring had a child.

In 2015, a deluxe edition of El Perro del Mar's debut album was released, with the package containing eleven bonus tracks including the unreleased demos "In the Woods" and "An Eye for Gold".

Her fifth album was released on September 16, 2016, and entitled KoKoro. The album was trailed with the release of the singles "BreadandButter" and "Ding Sum". According to Assbring, "KoKoro" is influenced by her "listening to only Japanese, Chinese, Thai, and Indian pop music for the last three years.' The album was co-written and co-produced with Jacob Haage.

On October 10, 2023, City Slang label announced El Perro del Mar signing and a new album Big Anonymous to be released on February 16, 2024.

== Discography ==
=== Studio albums ===
Year	Album details	Peak chart positions
Year	Album details	SWE
2005	Look! It's El Perro del Mar!: Debut studio album; Release date: 2005; Label: Hybris Records	—
2006	El Perro del Mar: 1st studio album(intl version of the debut album); Release date: 5 June 2006; Label: Memphis Industries, The Control Group	—
2008	From the Valley to the Stars: 2nd studio album; Release date: 3 March 2008; Label: Licking Fingers, Memphis Industries, The Control Group	32
2009	Love Is Not Pop: 3rd studio album; Release date: 1 April 2009; Label: Licking Fingers, The Control Group	37
2012	Pale Fire: 4th studio album; Release date: 13 November 2012; Label: Memphis Industries, INGRID, The Control Group	43
2016	KoKoro: 5th studio album; Release date: 16 September 2016; Label: Ging Ging Recordings, Tugboat, Gentle Reminder, The Control Group	
2024	Big Anonymous: 6th studio album; Release date: 16 February 2024; Label: City Slang	

=== EPs ===
- You Gotta Give to Get (2005)
- "I Was a Boy" (2013)
- "We Are History" (2018)
- "Free Land" (2020)

=== Singles ===
- "Oh What A Christmas!" (2004)
- "I’ve Got Good News" (2004)
- "Baby I’ve Been In A Bad Place" (2004)
- "Jens Lekman/El Perro del Mar" (2004)
- "What's New?" (November 1, 2004)
- "You Gotta Give to Get" (November 2005)
- "Dog" (2006)
- "How Did We Forget?" (February 13, 2008)
- "Auld Lang Syne" (December 16, 2008)
- "Glory to the World" (2008)
- "Lykke Li/El Perro del Mar" (2009)
- "Change of Heart" (2009), Licking Fingers
- "Walk on By" (2012), Memphis Industries
- "Breadandbutter" (2016), Ging Ging Recordings
- "Fångad Av En Stormvind" (2016), Spinnup
- "IWD4U" (2016)
- "Breaking The Girl" (2016)
- "Fight For Life" (2017)
- "Mirrors" (2018)
- "Broder" (2018)
- "Please stay" (2019)
- "The Bells" (2020)
- "Dreamers change the world" (2020)
- "Life is full of rewards" (2018)
- "Låt Oss Förvandlas" (2026)
