= Drama (Montt Mardié album) =

Studio album by Montt Mardié
- Released: 7 November 2005
- Recorded: 2005
- Genre: Indie pop
- Length: 40:30
- Label: Hybris

Montt Mardié chronology
| Drama (2005) | Clocks/Pretender (2007) |

Professional ratings
Review scores
| Source | Rating |
|---|---|
| Allmusic | link |

Drama is the debut full-length album of Swedish indie pop musician Montt Mardié. It was released on 7 November 2005 by the Swedish record label Hybris. The album is very pop oriented, allowing many different tempos and styles to be placed next to one another. References to a girl named Annie are made throughout in more than five of the album's twelve songs.

== Track listing ==
| No. | Title | Producer(s) | Length |
|---|---|---|---|
| 1. | "Modesty Blaise" | David Pagmar | 3:16 |
| 2. | "High School Drama" | David Pagmar | 2:55 |
| 3. | "How to Kill a Mockingbird" | David Pagmar | 2:58 |
| 4. | "New York" | David Pagmar | 2:46 |
| 5. | "Changed (A Sailor's Plea)" | David Pagmar | 3:02 |
| 6. | "Prom Night (Dancing by Myself)" | David Pagmar | 2:42 |
| 7. | "Huckleberry Friend" | David Pagmar | 2:52 |
| 8. | "Death of a House (A Ghost Story)" | David Pagmar | 3:18 |
| 9. | "Bag of Marbles" | David Pagmar | 4:21 |
| 10. | "Babylon" (featuring Wiley) | David Pagmar | 3:24 |
| 11. | "Phone Call Drama" | David Pagmar | 4:18 |
| 12. | "Come on Eileen" | | 4:29 |
