= El Perro del Mar (album) =

Studio album by El Perro del Mar
- Released: 10 April 2006
- Recorded: 2005
- Studio: Monsterstudion, Gothenburg, Sweden
- Genre: Pop
- Length: 32:55
- Label: Hybris
- Producer: Sarah Assbring

El Perro del Mar chronology
Look! It's El Perro del Mar! (2005)	El Perro del Mar (2006)	From the Valley to the Stars (2008)

Singles from El Perro del Mar
- 1. "God Knows (You Gotta Give to Get)" Released: November 2005

Professional ratings
Review scores
Source	Rating
AllMusic	link
Pitchfork	8.1/10 link

El Perro del Mar is the second album by Swedish musician Sarah Assbring, a.k.a. El Perro del Mar. It was first released in Sweden on 10 April 2006 by Hybris Records, in Europe by Memphis Industries, in Australasia on 6 November 2006 by Rogue Records, and in the United States on 7 November 2006 by The Control Group. The album is a revised version of her 2005 compilation Look! It's El Perro del Mar!.

The album was preceded by a single release for "God Knows (You Gotta Give to Get)" in November 2005; its accompanying animated music video was directed by Åsa Arnehed. A music video for "Party", directed by Emily de Groot, followed in 2006.

On 19 May 2015, The Control Group reissued the album for its tenth anniversary. The reissue includes a selection of bonus tracks, demos and radio sessions, and was released on green-coloured double vinyl.

== Track listing ==
All tracks are written by Sarah Assbring, unless otherwise noted.

No.	Title	Writer(s)	Length
1.	"Candy"		3:22
2.	"God Knows (You Gotta Give to Get)"		3:39
3.	"Party"		3:12
4.	"People"		3:18
5.	"Dog"		3:01
6.	"I Can't Talk About It"		2:52
7.	"Coming Down the Hill"		2:32
8.	"This Loneliness"		4:37
9.	"It's All Good"		3:01
10.	"Here Comes That Feeling"	Dorsey Burnette, Joe Osborn	3:21
Total length:			32:55

US CD bonus track
No.	Title	Length
11.	"Shake It Off"	3:16
Total length:		36:11

Australia/New Zealand CD bonus tracks
No.	Title	Length
11.	"Shake It Off"	3:16
12.	"Do the Dog"	3:00
13.	"Say"	3:09
14.	"Hello Goodbye"	4:24
