= Rave the Reqviem =

Swedish industrial metal band

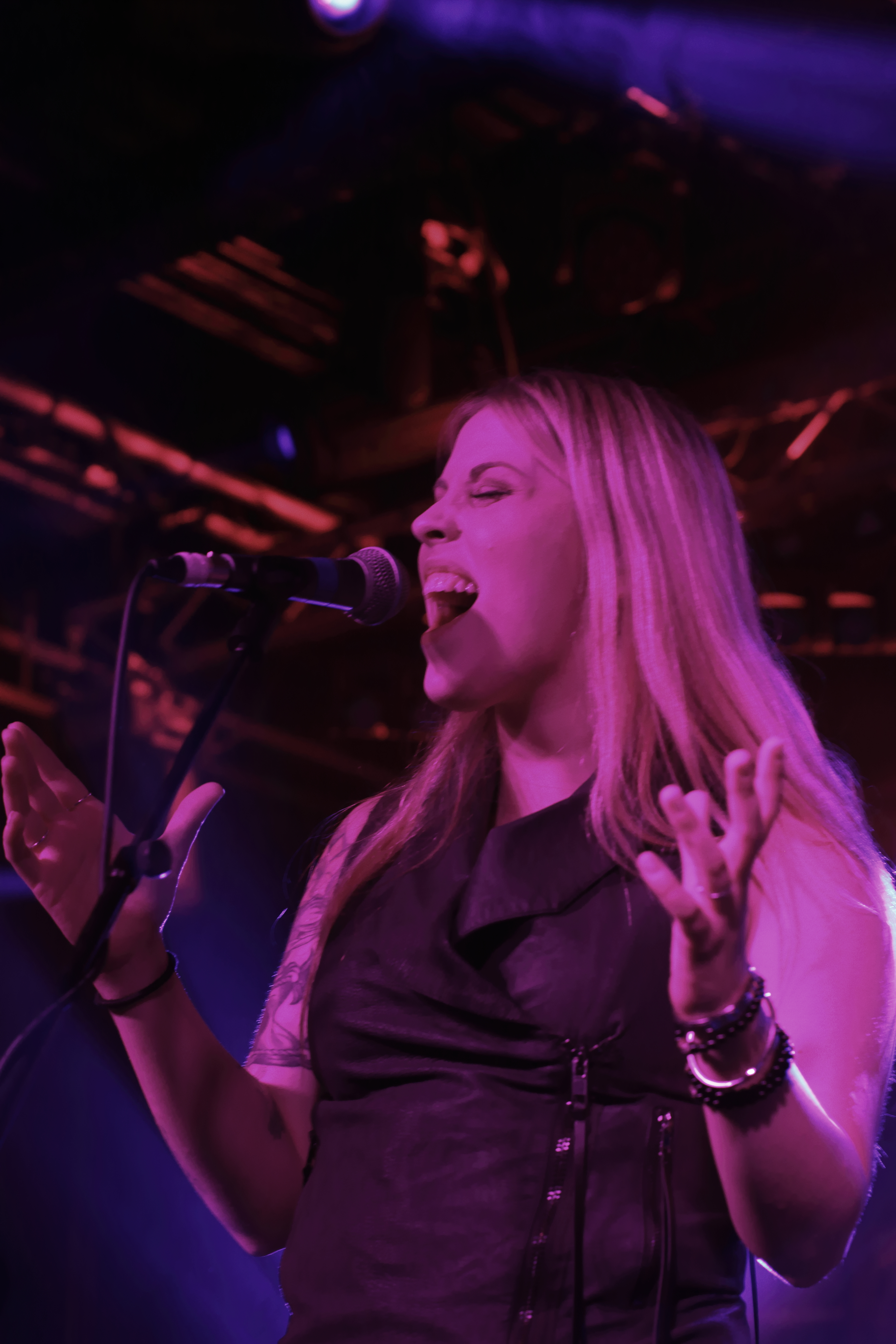
- Infest 2019 Bands Rave The Reqviem

Background information
- Origin: Borgholm, Sweden
- Genre: Industrial Metal
- Years active: 2011–present
- Label: Out of Line Music
- Members: Filip Lönnqvist; Rickard Lindgren; Petter Perseius; Frank Petersson
- Past members: Erik Cederberg; Carola Lönnqvist; Jenny Fagerstrandh; Jennie Nord
- Website: https://www.ravethereqviem.com/

Rave the Reqviem, sometimes referred to as RTR or the Chvrch of RTR, is a Swedish industrial metal band from Borgholm. They were formed by Filip Lönnqvist in late 2011. They are currently signed to the German independent record label Out of Line Music.

== History ==
Filip Lönnqvist formed the band in the fall of 2011, along with his mother Carola. In late 2017, Carola Lönnqvist left the band and was replaced by Jenny Fagerstrandh. Before joining Rave the Reqviem, Fagerstrandh was in a band named Rockaholic with fellow RTR member Frank Petersson.

In 2014 the band begun to gain popularity in Russia through the social media site VK, and have played twice in Moscow and once in Saint Petersburg as of 2023.

In 2019, pianist Erik Cederberg left the band, and was later replaced by Rickard Lindgren.

Rave the Reqviem appeared at Infest 2019, on Saturday August 24.

Fagerstrandh left the band in 2020, and was later replaced by Jennie Nord.

On April 27, 2023, Rave the Reqviem released the fourth single from their upcoming album EX-EDEN, "How to Hate Again", featuring Joacim "Jake E" Lundberg of Cyhra.

== Style and influence ==
The band notably incorporates religious (especially New Testament) themes into their monikers, album titles, song titles, and lyrics. In a 2017 interview with Inferno Sound Diaries, founder Filip Lönnqvist cites the Bible as his "favorite source of inspiration", but describes music as being "[his] religion".

As with their name, Rave the Reqviem notably replaces all instances of the letter "u" in their album titles, song titles, and social media posts, with a "v", a common practice in the written English language before the 16th century.

== Members ==
Each member of Rave the Reqviem uses a religious-themed pseudonym.

- Filip Lönnqvist, "The Prophet" - Vocals, Guitars, Bass, Synthesizer (2011 - present)
- Rickard Lindgren, "The Cantor" - Vocals, Percussion, Keyboards (2019 - present)
- Petter Perseius, "The Archbishop" - Bass (2011 - present)
- Frank Petersson, "The Deacon" - Drums (2011 - present)

=== Former members ===
- Carola Lönnqvist, "The Holy Mother" - Vocals (2011 - 2017)
- Erik Cederberg, "The High Priest" - Keyboards, Backing Vocals (2011 - 2019)
- Jenny Fagerstrandh, "The Seraph" - Vocals (2017 - 2020)
- Jennie Nord, "The Sister Svperior" - Vocals (2020 - 2026)

== Discography ==
- Rave the Reqviem (November 2014)
- The Gospel of Nil (October 2016)
- FVNERAL [sic] (October 2018)
- Stigmata Itch (December 2020)
- EX-EDEN (October 2023)
