= Phonetic alphabet =

Phonetic alphabet can mean:

- Phonetic transcription system: a system for transcribing the precise sounds of human speech into writing
  - International Phonetic Alphabet (IPA): the most widespread such system
  - (See Category:Phonetic alphabets for other phonetic transcription systems)
- Phonemic orthography: an orthography that represents the sounds of a particular language in such a way that one symbol corresponds to each speech sound and vice versa
- Spelling alphabet a.k.a. radio alphabet: a set of code words for the names of the letters of an alphabet, used in noisy conditions such as radio communication; each word typically stands for its own initial letter
  - NATO phonetic alphabet: the international standard (e.g., Alfa, Bravo, Charlie, Delta etc.)
  - (See Category:Spelling alphabets for other radio-telephony spelling alphabets)
