= Lebensraum! =

Studio album by Jonathan Johansson
- Released: 18 March 2015
- Label: Sony

Jonathan Johansson chronology
Ett språk för dom dömda (2013)	Lebensraum! (2015)	Love & Devotion (2016)

Lebensraum! (German for Living Space) is the fourth studio album by Swedish artist Jonathan Johansson, released on 18 March 2015 by S:t C and Sony Music Sweden. The album charted at number 22 on the Swedish Albums Chart.

== Critical reception ==
Professional ratings
Review scores
Source	Rating
Allehanda	5/5
Aftonbladet	4/5 stars
Expressen	3/5 stars
Gaffa	5/6 stars

Lebensraum! received generally positive reviews from Swedish music critics. The Swedish website, Kritiker, which assigns a normalised rating out of 5.0 to reviews from mainstream critics across the country, gave the album an average score of 4.1, based on 16 reviews. Per Magnusson of Aftonbladet highlighted "Ny / snö" as the best track on the record, and opined that on "Lebensraum!", "Jonathan Johansson dares – and wins". Anders Nunstedt of Expressen considered the album's theme to be politics, and that the "music on it is densely packed with words, smartly crafted and sharply aimed at neo-fascism and narrow-mindedness in society. An album as important as it is beautiful".

== Track listing ==
All music written by Jonathan Johansson and Johan Eckeborn, except track 4, written by David Lindell and track 6, written by Samuel Starck. All lyrics written by Jonathan Johansson.

No.	Title	Length
1.	"Stromboli brinner" (Stromboli Burns)	4:29
2.	"Ny / Snö" (New / Snow)	4:05
3.	"Midsommarkransen Baby"	3:35
4.	"Lätt att släcka 98" (Easy to Extinguish 98)	5:08
5.	"Dålig stjärna (Min BFF i Berlin)" (Bad Star (My BFF in Berlin))	5:31
6.	"Palmagänget till dig" (The Palma Gang to You)	2:48
7.	"Svindel och vind" (Vertigo and Wind)	3:42
8.	"Dröm en dröm (Gullvik vs. Hermodsdal)" (Dream a Dream (Gullvik vs. Hermodsdal))	4:17
9.	"Du kommer krossa" (You Will Crush)	4:25
10.	"Alla helveten" (All the Hells)	3:34
11.	"Bright Lights"	3:53
12.	"Fuga" (Fugue)	1:45

== Personnel ==
- Jonathan Johansson – music, lyrics, vocals, guitar, bass, drums, keyboards, synthesizer
- Johan Eckeborn – music, production
- Samuel Starck – music, piano
- David Lindell – music, bass, double bass
- David Lillberg – technician, piano, sampler, synthesizer
- Leo Svensson – cello
- Daniel Kurba – organ
- Stefan Olsson - acoustic guitar
- Henrik Edenhed – mixing
- Tom Coyne – mastering
- Rikkard Häggbom – photography
- Tobias Häggbom – artwork

== Charts ==
Chart (2015)	Peak position
Swedish Albums (Sverigetopplistan)	22
