= From the Valley to the Stars =

Studio album by El Perro del Mar
- Released: (European Union) March 3, 2008 (United States) April 22, 2008 (United Kingdom) May 19, 2008
- Recorded: 2007
- Genre: Pop
- Label: Licking Fingers (Scandinavia); The Control Group (US); Memphis Industries (UK)
- Producer: Sarah Assbring

El Perro del Mar chronology
El Perro del Mar (2006)	From the Valley to the Stars (2008)	Love Is Not Pop (2009)

Professional ratings
Review scores
Source	Rating
Allmusic	link
Tiny Mix Tapes	link
NME	(8/10) (05/17/2008, p.38)
Pitchfork Media	(6.7/10) link

From the Valley to the Stars is the second official studio album by El Perro del Mar. The album was first released in Scandinavia on March 3, 2008, in the US on April 22, 2008 and in the UK on May 19, 2008. The first single is "How Did We Forget?", released on February 13, 2008.

== Track listing ==
1. "Jubilee" - 2:12
2. "Glory to the World" - 2:52
3. "You Can't Steal a Gift" - 2:33
4. "How Did We Forget?" - 3:11
5. "Inside the Golden Egg" - 1:46
6. "To Give Love" - 2:28
7. "Inner Island" - 4:39
8. "Do Not Despair" - 3:20
9. "Somebody's Baby" - 2:29
10. "The Sun Is an Old Friend" - 1:02
11. "Happiness Won Me Over" - 3:44
12. "From the Valley to the Stars" - 2:23
13. "You Belong to the Sky Now" - 1:38
14. "Into the Sunshine" - 2:58
15. "Someday I'll Understand (Love Will Be My Mirror)" - 3:44
16. "Your Name Is Neverending" - 2:08

== Singles ==
- "How Did We Forget?" (February 13, 2008)
  - b/w: "You Hit Me (It's a Crying Shame)"

== Appearance in television ==
- The L Word
- Grey's Anatomy
