= Shorthand Phonetics =

Indonesian indie rock music group

- Origin: Jakarta, Indonesia
- Genres: Indie rock Lo-fi; Film score
- Years active: 2003 or 2004 - 2015
- Labels: Yes No Wave Music and Tsefula/Tsefuelha Records
- Past members: Ababil Ashari; Dylan Amirio; Garbanu Priaduaja; Alfonsus Tanoto; Daniel Sastro; Kevin Yapsir; Alvin Lasmana; Wulan Ardhana Iswari
- Website: Official website

Shorthand Phonetics is an indie rock and film score outfit from Bandung, Indonesia which, as of 2013, only comprises Ababil Ashari (vocals, guitars, bass and programming). The outfit was established on 13 April 2004, although conflicting reports claims that the band has been releasing material since 2003. The outfit has been releasing music for Yogyakarta, Indonesia netlabel Yes No Wave Music since 2007.

Shorthand Phonetics used to be a five-piece full band comprising Ababil Ashari, Alfonsus Tanoto (bass), Daniel Sastro (guitar), Kevin Yapsir (guitar) and Alvin Lasmana (drums). This line up produced the first Shorthand Phonetics album, Fanfiction: From the Seriously Absurd to the Absurdly Serious (2006). After the release of this album however, the rest of the band members left to pursue academic degrees outside Indonesia, more specifically America and Singapore. This left Ababil to continue the namesake as a songwriting/recording outfit.

The Shorthand Phonetics recorded sound is a mix of staccato guitars, melodic strumming, frenetic drumming, and basic bass lines with loose vocals, that talk about mundane annoyances of life, produced in a lo-fi manner using webcam microphones and a laptop.

The outfit has topped the Jakarta Globe's list for the "Top 5 Indonesian Albums of ’09" for the film score album Score No. 1 (Dream:Chase) in A major, Op. 17 for Three Electric Guitars, One Bass Guitar and One Drum Kit.

The outfit's latest release, Cantata no. 6 (Assistants of Assistants) in Varying Keys, Op. 25 for Three Electric Guitars, One Bass Guitar, One Drum Kit, One Tenor and Additional Voices Where Appropriate was released on 10 August 2011.

In 2014, Shorthand Phonetics moved to Jakarta, Indonesia and gained two new permanent members in Dylan Amirio (bass, vox) and Garbanu Priduarja (drums, vox). This line-up lasted one year before Shorthand Phonetics disbanded in 2015.

== Discography ==
=== Albums ===
Year	Title
2006:	Fanfiction: From the Seriously Absurd to the Absurdly Serious
2007:	Apparently...I'm In Medicine / Love, or the Illusion of the Beginning Symptoms of It
2008:	Fire! (I Could Have Died and All I Could Think About Was My Charred Diary)
2009:	Errors in Calculating Odds, Errors in Calculating Value
2010:	Thirty-four minutes with hide and tsubasa
2011:	Cantata no. 6 (Assistants of Assistants) in Varying Keys, Op. 25 for Three Electric Guitars, One Bass Guitar, One Drum Kit, One Tenor and Additional Voices Where Appropriate

=== Film scores ===
Year	Title	Film	Director	Full or Partial Score
2008:	Original Soundtrack to the Semprul Production Motion Picture "Ngintip! Run, Budi, Run'"	Ngintip! Run, Budi, Run	I Wayan Andrew Handisurya	Full
2009:	Score No. 1 (Dream:Chase) in A major, Op. 17 for Three Electric Guitars, One Bass Guitar and One Drum Kit	Dream:Chase	Putri Zulmiyusrini and Hesti Nurmala Rizqi	Full
2010:	I Will No Longer be Afraid	At the Very Bottom Everything	Paul Agusta	Partial
