= Hybris (record label) =

Founded in 2004, Hybris is an independent record label located in Sweden. The Stockholm department is run by Mattias Lövkvist and John Gadnert and the Malmö department by Kalle Magnusson. A sister company to Hybris is Aloaded, working with complete distribution, label services and release promotion.

== Roster ==
- Postiljonen
- Jonathan Johansson
- Wy
- 1987
- Far & Son
- Juvelen
- Andreas Mattson
- El Perro del Mar
- Familjen
- Monty
- KOMMUN
- Hell on Wheels (band)
- Kalle J
- The Kid
- The Sweptaways
- Like Honey
- Lucas Nord
- Montt Mardié
- Sibiria
- Vapnet
- TIAC (Three Is A Crowd)
- Biker Boy
- Azure Blue
- Echo Ladies

== See also ==
- List of record labels
